= Call a Messenger =

1939 film by Arthur Lubin

- Directed by: Arthur Lubin
- Written by: Arthur T. Horman
- Based on: story by Michael Kraike; Sally Sandlin
- Produced by: Ken Goldsmith (associate producer)
- Starring: The Dead End Kids; Little Tough Guys
- Cinematography: Elwood Bredell
- Edited by: Charles Maynard
- Music by: Hans J. Salter
- Distributed by: Universal Studios
- Release date: November 4, 1939
- Running time: 65 minutes
- Country: United States
- Language: English
- Budget: $83,000

Call a Messenger is a 1939 Universal Studios film that starred Billy Halop and Huntz Hall of the Dead End Kids and several of the Little Tough Guys. It was directed by Arthur Lubin.

In terms of chronological order, this was released after the Dead End Kids film, The Angels Wash Their Faces.

== Plot ==
Jimmy Hogan and his gang are caught robbing a post office. Jimmy is given a choice to either go to reform school or work as a messenger boy for the post office as punishment. Jimmy decides to be a messenger boy, and soon drags his pals into the job. The kids eventually enjoy their jobs, especially when their new boss, Frances O'Neill, turns out to be quite attractive.

After becoming friends with fellow messenger boy Bob Prichard, Jimmy decides to hook Bob up with his sister, Marge. He feels that Bob is a much better match for Marge then a local gangster who has been spending too much time with her. Pretty soon, Jimmy's brother Ed returns home from prison. At first, Jimmy is glad to have his brother back home, but pretty soon, he and Ed get mixed up with some gangsters who plan on robbing the post office.

== Cast ==
=== The Dead End Kids ===
- Billy Halop - Jimmy Hogan
- Huntz Hall - Ratholemew 'Pig' Smith

=== The Little Tough Guys ===
- Hally Chester - B. 'Murph' Murphy
- Billy Benedict - P. 'Trouble' Kearns
- David Gorcey - J. 'Yap' Crawley
- Harris Berger - R. 'Sailor' Walters

=== Additional Cast ===
- Robert Armstrong - Kirk Graham
- Mary Carlisle - Marge Hogan
- Anne Nagel - Frances O'Neill
- Victor Jory - Ed Hogan
- Buster Crabbe - Chuck Walsh
- El Brendel - 'Baldy'
- Jimmy Butler - Bob Prichard
- George Offerman Jr. - Big Lip

== Production ==
The film was based on an original story by Michael Kraike and Sally Sandlin. Universal purchased it in April 1939. In July 1939 the studio said Arthur Lubin would direct it with the Dead End Kids. Filming started early August.

Dead End Kids Billy Halop and Huntz Hall returned to Universal beginning with this film. Universal decided to pair the Dead End Kids with the Little Tough Guys. Pretty soon, most of the other Dead End Kids would also sign on. In this film, the billing appears as: Billy Halop and Huntz Hall of the Dead End Kids and the Little Tough Guys.

Most of the Little Tough Guys returned for this film, reprising the roles they had in their previous films. The only regular Little Tough Guy who did not return for this film was 'Monk' (Charles Duncan). Ironically, at one point in this film, Jimmy's sister makes a reference to Monk, even though he is absent.

== Reception ==
The Los Angeles Times called it "entertaining... acting is lively and expressive, direction smooth and clear."
