= Swingtime in the Movies =

1938 film

- Directed by: Crane Wilbur
- Written by: Crane Wilbur
- Starring: Fritz Feld
- Cinematography: Wilfred M. Cline
- Edited by: Everett Dodd
- Distributed by: Warner Bros.
- Release date: December 24, 1938
- Running time: 20 minutes
- Country: United States
- Language: English

Swingtime in the Movies is a 1938 American short comedy–musical film directed and written by Crane Wilbur. In 1939, it was nominated for an Academy Award for Best Live Action Short Film, Two-Reel at the 11th Academy Awards. Swingtime in the Movies is included on the DVD of the 1940 Raoul Walsh film They Drive By Night.

== Plot ==
Language-mangling director Mr.Nitvitch is attempting to shoot a low budget western. His leading lady has a lisp and the leading man asks "When do we eat?" in the middle of love scenes. Nitvitch nearly drowns in an artificial lake while trying to teach the lovers proper kissing technique.

Eating in the star-studded studio commissary, Nitvitch finds his new leading lady, Joan Mason, among the waitresses. Despite Jerry Colonna lurking about the set ogling the chorus girls, the film is successfully completed. During a parade to celebrate the completion, Nitvitch's director's chair is caught on a high tree branch. He is left hanging there as the parade continues.

== Cast ==
- Fritz Feld as Mr. Nitvitch
- Kathryn Kane as Joan Mason (as Katherine Kane)
- John Carroll as Rick Arden
- Charley Foy as Sammy
- Jerry Colonna as The Texas Tornado
- Helen Lynd as Lorna, an Actress
- Irene Franklin as Kate, Head Waitress

Featuring:

- George Brent as himself (uncredited)
- Marie Wilson as herself (uncredited)
- Pat O'Brien as himself (uncredited)
- The Dead End Kids (Huntz Hall, Leo Gorcey, Billy Halop, and Bobby Jordan) as 'Crime School Kids' (uncredited)
- Humphrey Bogart as himself (uncredited)
- John Garfield as himself (uncredited)
- Lane Sisters as Themselves (uncredited)
