= Bernard Punsly =

American actor and physician

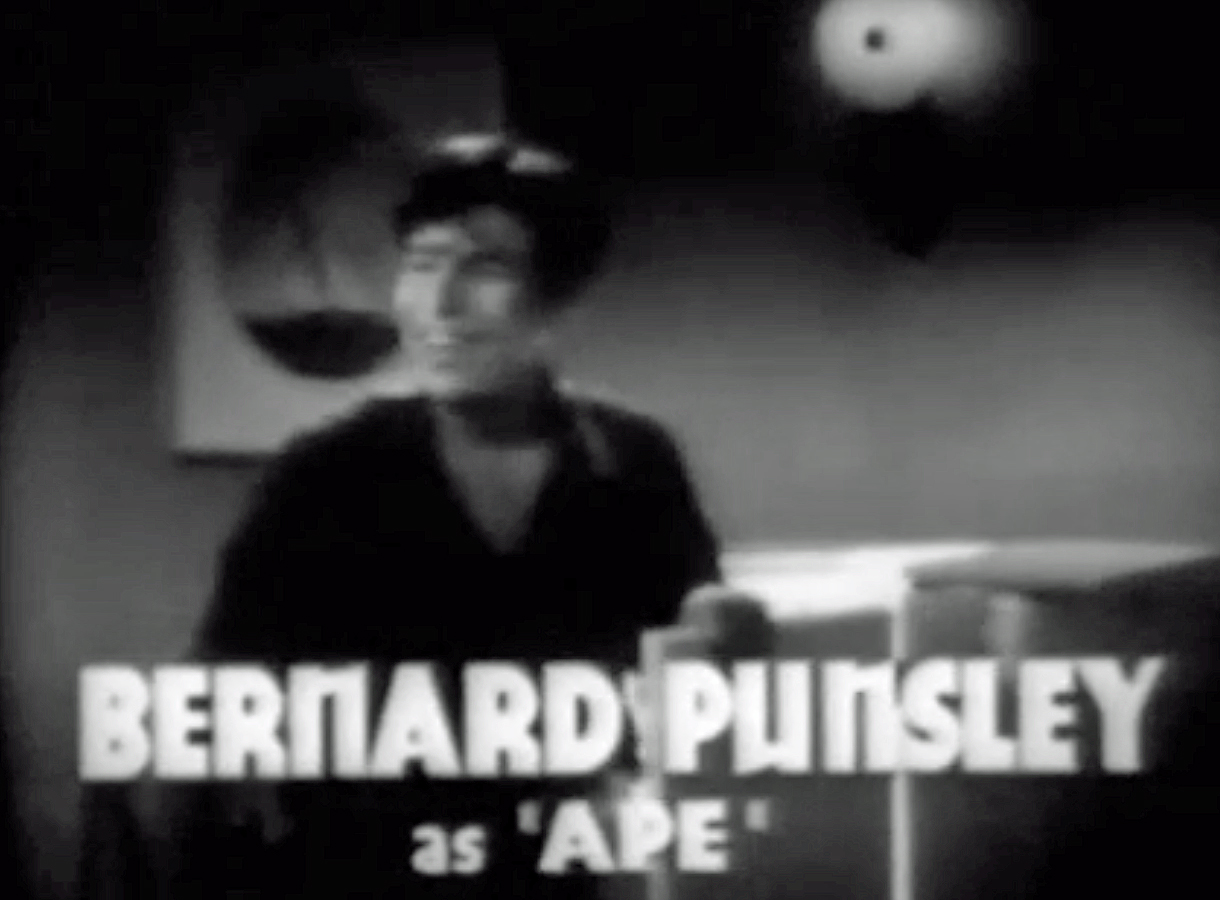
- Punsly in trailer to "Little Tough Guy" (1938)
- Born: July 11, 1923; New York City, U.S.
- Died: January 20, 2004 (aged 80); Torrance, California, U.S.
- Occupation(s): Actor, physician
- Years active: 1937–1943 (as actor); 1949-2002 (as physician)

Bernard Punsly, also known as Bernard Punsley (July 11, 1923 – January 20, 2004) was an American actor and physician. He was the last surviving member of the Dead End Kids.

== Biography ==
=== Early life and acting career ===
Punsly was born on July 11, 1923, in New York City, the son of a tailor. He began his acting career at the age of eight in the play I Love An Actress. He was later cast as Milty in the Broadway play Dead End.

The success of the play led to Punsly and some of its child actors being cast in a 1937 film adaptation, Dead End. In the film, which portrayed the youths as victims of society.Punsly again played Milty. After that film he appeared in the Little Tough Guys series. His other films included Angels With Dirty Faces (1938), Little Tough Guy (1938) and Hell's Kitchen (1939). He played W.C. Fields' caddy in The Big Broadcast of 1938.

At his death, the Los Angeles Times recounted that Punsly "often played the innocent youth that got hooked up with the gang," and that off-camera he was considered the "good kid" among the actors.

The success of the led to the group appearing in a series of films that featured actors from the films. He went on to appear in 18 other films. During his career he worked with stars such as Ronald Reagan, James Cagney, Pat O'Brien, John Garfield, and Humphrey Bogart.

In 1994, Punsly appeared with the other last survivor of the Dead End Kids, Huntz Hall, in which the group received a star on the Hollywood Walk of Fame. Hall died in 1999.

=== After acting ===
Punsly left acting after his last film, Mug Town (1942), when other actors in the series went on to become the Bowery Boys. Punsly joined the U.S. Army in 1943. While serving in the Army Air Forces he received medical training.

Upon discharge from the Army, Punsly entered the Medical College of Georgia at the University of Georgia, obtaining his medical degree in 1949. He moved to Los Angeles and served and internship and residency at Los Angeles County Medical Center. He became an internist at Little Company of Mary Hospital. He became chief of staff at South Bay Hospital in Redondo Beach in 1971. He retired in 2002.

=== Personal life ===
Punsly married Marilyn "Lynne" Kufferman in 1950. He lived for many years in Palos Verdes Estates.

Punsly died of cancer on January 20, 2004, at age 80, in Torrance, California. He was survived by his wife, a son, two grandchildren and a sister.

== Filmography ==
Year	Title	Role	Notes
1937	Dead End	Milty	
1938	The Big Broadcast of 1938	Caddy	Uncredited
1938	Crime School	George "Fats" Papadopoulos	
1938	Little Tough Guy	Ape	
1938	Angels with Dirty Faces	Hunky	
1939	They Made Me a Criminal	Milt	
1939	Hell's Kitchen	Patrick Henry 'Ouch' Rosenbloom	
1939	The Angels Wash Their Faces	Sleepy Arkelian	
1939	On Dress Parade	Dutch	
1940	You're Not So Tough	Ape	
1940	Junior G-Men	Lug	Serial
1940	Give Us Wings	Ape	
1941	Hit the Road	Ape	
1941	Mob Town	Ape	
1941	Sea Raiders	Butch	Serial
1942	Junior G-Men of the Air	'Creaseball' Plunkett	Serial
1942	Tough as They Come	Ape	
1942	Junior Army	Bad Eye - Gang Member	Uncredited
1943	Mug Town	Ape	Final film
