= Hell's Kitchen (1939 film) =

1939 thriller film

- Theatrical release poster
- Directed by: Lewis Seiler; E.A. DuPont
- Written by: Crane Wilbur; Fred Niblo, Jr.
- Produced by: Mark Hellinger; Bryan Foy
- Starring: Billy Halop; Bobby Jordan; Leo Gorcey; Huntz Hall; Gabriel Dell; Bernard Punsly; Margaret Lindsay; Ronald Reagan; Stanley Fields
- Cinematography: Charles Rosher
- Edited by: Clarence Kolster
- Music by: Ray Heindorf; Heinz Roemheld
- Distributed by: Warner Bros. Pictures
- Release date: July 8, 1939
- Running time: 82 minutes
- Country: United States
- Language: English

Hell's Kitchen is a 1939 thriller Warner Bros. film starring The Dead End Kids and Ronald Reagan.

== Plot ==
Buck Caesar is a paroled convict who makes a contribution to a shelter for teenage reform school parolees on the advice of his nephew, Jim Donahue, a lawyer. Jim feels that the boys in the shelter could benefit from the contribution, and he believes the publicity from it will help his uncle.

At the shelter, one of the teachers, Beth, sneaks a group of the boys—Tony, Gyp, Joey, Bingo, Ace, Soap, and Ouch—out of the shelter for a day out. They are caught returning by the superintendent, Hiram Krispan, who calls Tony into his office and threatens to lock Joey, the sickliest of the gang, in the freezer for coming up with the idea to sneak off to town. Tony says it was his idea and Krispan locks him in the freezer. Joey releases Tony in the middle of the night and Tony disappears.

Buck and Jim arrive at the reform school where he witnesses Beth being fired. Beth tells Joey that Tony is safe with her and the Krispan fired her. Joey tells Gyp and Soap that Beth has been fired and the boys start a riot. Buck and Jim go to Beth's house and speak to her and Tony about how the shelter is run. Tony tells Buck and Jim that Krispan is not the kind and tenderhearted man he appears. He beats and starves the boys, and locks them in the freezer when they defy him, and there are some boys who would rather be back in reform school than at the shelter. Buck decides to take over the shelter as superintendent, with the help of Beth and Jim. He makes the shelter into a "Boy's Town", with Tony as Mayor, and Gyp as Chief of Police. Jim contributes by forming a hockey team.

Though no longer fully in charge of the shelter, Krispan has continued as an employee and has been carrying two sets of financial books. Upset that the shelter is being run by a paroled gangster, he gets a professional hockey team formed by Mike Garvey, a former associate of Buck's, to substitute for the team the shelter will be playing. Garvey challenges Buck to place a large bet on the school, knowing that the shelter will lose. When Buck finds out that Garvey swindled him, he violently knocks Garvey onto the ice, violating his parole. Garvey is taken to the hospital and Buck goes into hiding to avoid arrest.

Krispan reinstates himself as superintendent of the school, doubling down on punishment and abuse of the boys, telling them that Buck has abandoned them. When Joey calls him a liar, Krispan locks Joey into a freezer, and tries to shoot Joey's dog. The dog escapes and takes Krispan's gun, both of which are found by Gyp. Joey is left in the freezer for nine hours and his frozen body is brought back to the dormitory by the guard that finds him. Gyp goes to Krispan's office and tells him that Joey is dead, so Krispan has committed murder. Krispan decides to bury Joey in his personal plot to cover up his crime.

At Joey's funeral, Ace, Gyp and Tony incite the other boys to revolt and capture Krispan. Gyp wants to shoot him, but Tony convinces them to try Krispan for murder instead, When Beth and Jim try to stop them, Soap and Gyp lock them in a storeroom. Beth calls Buck to inform him of the riot and Joey's death. The boys hold a trial in the shelter's administration building, with Soap serving as prosecuting attorney, and Tony as judge. They find Krispan guilty of murder and prepare to bury him alive. A panicked Krispan leaps out the window and hides in the barn, which is set alight by Gyp. Krispan tries to escape in a car, but crashes into a tree and is further attacked by the boys. Buck arrives and tells the boys to put out the fire and let the authorities handle Krispan.

At a final celebratory dinner for the shelter, Buck informs the boys that Krispan is punished through the proper legal channels, and Beth and Jim will be running the shelter until he is able to come back. He tells them he's leaving because he committed a crime, and came out of hiding because he cared about the boys and doesn't want them to turn out like him. As the boys, Jim and Beth sing "Aud Lang Syne" in farewell, Buck walks out to meet a waiting policeman, who is taking him to prison for violation of parole.

== Cast ==
=== The Dead End Kids ===
- Billy Halop as Tony Marco
- Bobby Jordan as Joey Richards
- Leo Gorcey as Gyp Haller
- Gabriel Dell as Ace
- Huntz Hall as Bingo
- Bernard Punsly as Patrick Henry "Ouch" Rosenbloom

=== Additional players and supporting cast ===
- Ronald Reagan as Jim Donahue
- Margaret Lindsay as Beth Avery
- Stanley Fields as Buck Caesar
- Frankie Burke as Soap
- Grant Mitchell as Krispan
- Frederic Tozere as Mike Garvey
- Arthur Loft as Elmer Krispan
- Vera Lewis as Sarah Krispan
- Robert Homans as Hardy
- Charley Foy as Floogie
- Raymond Bailey as Whitey
- Robert Strange as Callahan
- Ernie Stanton as Nick
- Clem Bevans as Mr. Quill
- George Irving as Judge
- Lee Phelps as Bailiff
- Jimmy O'Gatty as Mug
- Ila Rhodes as Maizie
- Don Turner as Chick
- George O'Hanlon as Usher

== Previous versions ==
The film is a remake of The Mayor of Hell (1933) starring James Cagney, and another Dead End Kids film, Crime School (1938).

== Rating ==
The film was given an "H" rating (now known as an "X" rating) in the United Kingdom due to its violence.

== Home media ==
The film was released as a double feature DVD by Warner Archives with On Dress Parade on January 22, 2013.
