= Give Us Wings =

1940 film by Charles Lamont

- Lobby card
- Directed by: Charles Lamont
- Written by: Arthur T. Horman (screenplay); Robert Lee Johnson (screenplay); Eliot Gibbons (story)
- Produced by: Ken Goldsmith (associate producer)
- Starring: Billy Halop; Huntz Hall; Gabriel Dell; Bernard Punsly; Bobby Jordan; Shemp Howard
- Cinematography: John Boyle
- Edited by: Frank Gross
- Music by: Charles Previn (musical director); H.J. Salter (conductor); Frank Skinner (composer: stock music); Paul Van Loan (composer: stock music)
- Production company: Universal Pictures
- Distributed by: Universal Pictures
- Release date: December 20, 1940
- Running time: 62 minutes
- Country: United States
- Language: English

Give Us Wings is a 1940 Universal comedic film starring the Dead End Kids and the Little Tough Guys. Several members of the casts of those series were also featured in "The East Side Kids" films.

In the years before World War II, the United States government encouraged Hollywood studios to produce films that would encourage youth to join the resurgent armed forces, especially the U.S. Army Air Corps. Give Us Wings joined 20,000 Men a Year (1939), I Wanted Wings (1941), Flying Cadets (1941) and others of that genre, as a patriotic "flag-waver".

== Plot ==
Tom, Pig, String, Ape, and Rap, collectively known as "The Dead End Kids", are learning to become aeronautical mechanics in the National Youth Administration Work Program plant. The Kids really want to fly and think they have learned enough to become pilots.

Their dreams of flight will not come true because the Civil Aeronautics Authority flight school requires them to have completed high school, something none of them have achieved. Seeking out a flight school, the Kids go to work for unscrupulous crop dusting operator Arnold Carter. Quickly realizing that pilot training is unlikely, Carter's manager, Mr. York puts them to work as mechanics.

Carter's aircraft are old and his only pilot, "Tex" Austin feels that the boys are far too inexperienced to fly, but Carter is desperate to keep the crop dusting operation going, and after Tex crashes, the boys are forced to take over. York finally agrees that the boys, except for Rap who is terrified of flying after witnessing the Tex's crash, can fly, and they take to the air.

Aware of the dangers of its tall groves of trees, York refuses to dust a particular field but Carter convinces Rap to do the job. While flying over the trees, Rap crashes to his death. Losing his nerve, Carter tries to make a getaway in an aircraft, but Tom follows in another craft and forces him to earth with a dose of dust. He is met by the other boys, who turn him over to the authorities.

== Cast ==
=== The Dead End Kids ===
- Billy Halop as Tom
- Huntz Hall as Pig
- Gabriel Dell as String
- Bernard Punsly as Ape
- Bobby Jordan as Rap

(Note: After completing this film, Bobby Jordan left the Universal Dead End Kids/Little Tough Guys series, and signed on to Monogram Pictures to costar with fellow Dead End Kid Leo Gorcey in the East Side Kids series. Jordan would return to Universal to replace Billy Halop in Keep 'Em Slugging, the final Dead End Kids film for Universal.)

=== The Little Tough Guys ===
- Harris Berger - Bud
- Billy Benedict - Link

=== Additional cast ===
- Wallace Ford as Mr. York
- Anne Gwynne as Julie Mason
- Victor Jory as Mr. Arnold Carter
- Shemp Howard as "Buzz Berger" (a.k.a. Whitey) (Note: Although his character is referred to as "Buzz" throughout the film, the credits for this film state that Shemp Howard's character name was "Whitey".)
- Milburn Stone as "Tex" Austin

== Production ==
Give Us Wings was based on Eliot Gibbon's story, "Men of Dust". Principal photography on Give Us Wings began in late August 1940. The film was one of the last of the prewar aviation films in which the Associated Motion Picture Pilots Association was involved.

== Reception ==
Aviation film historian Stephen Pendo, in Aviation in the Cinema (1985) noted Give Us Wings was a comedy vehicle for two noted film comedy teams with a heavy reliance on slapstick antics.

The contemporary film review of Give Us Wings by Bosley Crowther in The New York Times, noted, "'Give Us Wings' is not a good, or even a passable, entertainment; in fact, it is so bad that it often is quite amusing. That may sound like a contradiction, but we'll wager audiences will find themselves in the embarrassing position of laughing involuntary at the lunatic doings."

Aviation film historian James M. Farmer in Celluloid Wings: The Impact of Movies on Aviation (1984), had a similar reaction, saying that Give Us Wings (was) "A terrible film even by Dead End standards."
