= You're Not So Tough =

1940 film by Joe May

- Directed by: Joe May
- Written by: Arthur T. Horman (screenplay); Brenda Weiberg (screenplay); Maxwell Aley (story)
- Produced by: Ken Goldsmith (associate producer)
- Starring: The Dead End Kids; Little Tough Guys
- Cinematography: Elwood Bredell
- Music by: Hans J. Salter
- Distributed by: Universal Studios
- Release date: July 26, 1940
- Running time: 65 min
- Country: United States
- Language: English

You're Not So Tough is a 1940 Universal Studios drama film directed by Joe May and starring Dead End Kids and the Little Tough Guys and was the first in the series where Billy Halop and Huntz Hall weren't billed in the opening credits before the Dead End Kids name.

== Plot ==
The Dead End Kids ride a freight train through California. After arrest, Tom and Pig are hired to work on a ranch owned by Mama Posito. Tom learns Posito hasn't seen her son in years, but believes he may still be alive. Tom decides to pose as her son. Posito's benevolence gets the best of Tom, and he stays for love, not greed.

== Cast ==
=== The Dead End Kids ===
- Billy Halop - Tommy Abraham Lincoln
- Huntz Hall - Albert 'Pig'
- Gabriel Dell - String
- Bernard Punsly - Ape
- Bobby Jordan - Rap

=== The Little Tough Guys ===
- Hally Chester - Second Newsboy
- Harris Berger - Jake, a Worker
- David Gorcey - First Worker

=== Additional cast ===
- Nan Grey - Millie
- Henry Armetta - Salvatore
- Rosina Galli- Mama (Lisa) Posita
- Joe King - Collins
- Arthur Loft - Marshall
- Harry Hayden - Lacey
- Eddy Waller - Les Griswold

== Production ==
Billy Halop and Huntz Hall were now joined by fellow Dead End Kids Gabriel Dell, Bernard Punsly, and Bobby Jordan, the latter making his first of three appearances in the Universal series.

The series was now officially coined "The Dead End Kids and The Little Tough Guys". However, much of the attention for most of these entries would be on the original Dead End Kids, while the Little Tough Guys were often reduced to walk-on cameos.
