= Mug Town =

1942 film

- Directed by: Ray Taylor
- Produced by: Ken Goldsmith
- Starring: Billy Halop; Huntz Hall; Grace McDonald
- Cinematography: Jack MacKenzie
- Edited by: Edward Curtiss
- Distributed by: Universal Pictures
- Release date: December 18, 1942
- Running time: 60 minutes
- Country: United States
- Language: English

Mug Town is a 1942 Universal film starring the Dead End Kids and the Little Tough Guys.

== Plot ==
Steve, Tommy, Pig, Ape, and String get chased out of town. During their attempt to hop onto a freight car, Steve dies. The other boys go and tell Alice, Steve's mother about what happened. This leads to Tommy getting a job in the storage facility which she co-owns with Mack. Don, Steve's brother, also works there and Tommy learns that he is working for gangsters by informing them of when valuable items are available to be stolen. The other boys learn of Don's plans to make Tommy as the "fall-guy" during the next job and set about to stop him.

== Cast ==
=== Dead End Kids and Little Tough Guys ===
- Billy Halop as Tommy Davis
- Huntz Hall as Pig
- Gabriel Dell as String
- Bernard Punsly as Ape

=== Additional cast ===
- Grace McDonald as Norene Steward
- Virginia Brissac as Mrs. Bell
- Tommy Kelly as Steve Bell
- Dick Hogan as Don Bell
- Jed Prouty as Mack Steward
