= The Mayor of Hell =

1933 film

- Theatrical release lobby card
- Directed by: Archie Mayo; Michael Curtiz (uncredited)
- Written by: Islin Auster (story Reform School); Edward Chodorov
- Starring: James Cagney; Madge Evans; Arthur Byron
- Cinematography: Barney McGill; Merritt Gerstad; Kenneth Green; Ben White; David Harris
- Edited by: Jack Killifer
- Music by: Leo F. Forbstein
- Distributed by: Warner Bros. Pictures, Inc.
- Release date: June 23, 1933 (U.S.)
- Running time: 90 minutes
- Country: United States
- Language: English

The Mayor of Hell is a 1933 American pre-Code crime film from Warner Bros. Pictures starring James Cagney.

The film was remade in 1938 as Crime School with Humphrey Bogart taking over James Cagney's role and Hell's Kitchen with Ronald Reagan in 1939.

== Plot ==
Racketeer Patsy Gargan is made deputy commissioner of a reform school as a reward from his corrupt political cronies. Initially, he has no interest in the school, but his sympathy for the boys, who are abused and battered by a brutal, heartless warden and his thuggish guards convince him to take the job seriously, as does an attractive resident nurse named Dorothy.

Gargan sends Thompson, the superintendent, on vacation and, while he is gone, puts Dorothy's reform ideas into action. The school is functioning well under a system of self-government when Patsy is called back to the city to take care of some political business. Patsy shoots another man during a fight and has to go into hiding. Thompson returns to the school and convinces the boys that Patsy has abandoned them. He then starts running things the old way and, when Dorothy protests over the poor quality of the food served, he fires her.

One of the boys, Johnny "Skinny" Stone, dies while in solitary confinement and the boys rebel. Thompson is put on trial by the boys, who find him guilty. Thompson, in a panic, jumps out a window to escape. Pursued by the boys, many of whom carry torches, he scrambles up onto the roof of a barn. The boys immediately set fire to the barn. Dorothy, meanwhile, finds Patsy in his hideout and tells him the whole story. Patsy races back to the school to restore order, but Thompson is dead, having fallen from the roof of the barn. At the picture's end, Patsy decides to give up his political career and stay at the school permanently.

== Cast ==
- James Cagney as Patsy Gargan (deputy commissioner)
- Madge Evans as Dorothy Griffith (nurse)
- Arthur Byron as Judge Gilbert
- Allen Jenkins as Mike
- Dudley Digges as Thompson (warden)
- Frankie Darro as Jimmy Smith
- Sheila Terry as Blonde with Mike
- Robert Barrat as Fred Smith
- Allen "Farina" Hoskins as Smoke
- Harold Huber as Joe
- Dorothy Peterson as Mrs. Smith
- G. Pat Collins as Brandon
- Edwin Maxwell as Louis Johnson
- John Marston as Hopkins
- William V. Mong as Mr. Walter (auditor)
- Mickey Bennett as Butch
- Sidney Miller as Izzy
- Hobart Cavanaugh as Mr. Gorman
- George Humbert as Mr. Carmonotti
- Raymond Borzage as Johnny Stone
- George Offerman Jr. as Charlie
- Charles E. Cane as Tommy
- Charlie Schneider as Boy
- Beaudine Anderson as Boy
- James Donlan as Sam
- Sam Finn as Joe's Henchman
- Ben Hendricks Jr. as Guard Taking Jimmy to Thompson
- Gladden James as Car Owner Paying 25¢
- Wilfred Lucas as Bill
- Wallace MacDonald as Man in Johnson's Office
- Larry McGrath as Johnston's Assistant
- Jack McHugh as Boy Prosecutor
- Bert Moorhouse as Joe's Henchman Playing Cards
- Adrian Morris as Car Owner Refusing to Pay
- Frank O'Connor as Cop in Court
- Henry Otho as Guard in School Armory
- Bob Perry as Collector
- Hector V. Sarno as Hollis
- Andy Shuford as Boy Judge
- William H. Strauss as Mr. Horowitz
- Charles Sullivan as Collector
- Ben Taggart as Sheriff
- Fred 'Snowflake' Toones as Mr. Hemingway
- Sailor Vincent as Guard
- Huey White as Joe's Henchman
- Charles C. Wilson as Wilson
- Harry Wilson as Joe's Henchman
- Dorothea Wolbert as Mrs. Burns

== Production ==
The film originally went under the title Reform School. It took 36 days to shoot with a cost of $229,000.

== Reception ==
On July 1, 1933, The New York Times review praised the film, saying:

The Warner Brothers, who made "I Am a Fugitive From a Chain Gang," have very nearly produced its equal in "The Mayor of Hell,"...[they] have uncovered a stimulating subject in the dark hard places of a boys' reform school. If James Cagney's affection for Madge Evans is a definite encumbrance in the film, the impact of its mounting bitterness and resentment against the penal system at the reform school is not to be denied. The wild fury of the boys in the closing scenes becomes contagious. There only can be tears to meet that touching scene in which Johnny, the little consumptive, dies on his cot while the other lads stand silently around him....The story is badly balanced because of an obtrusive gangster element and it bulges here and there to make room for Madge Evans... But the power, the vigor, the surge and flow of real issues and important psychological problems make 'The Mayor of Hell' an interesting and stimulating drama almost in spite of itself. Dudley Digges gives a superb portrait of a sniveling, knee-bending, wantonly domineering office holder as the warden. Arthur Byron is wise and troubled as the judge of the children's court. Mr. Cagney fills the part of the reformed ward heeler with the gusto and swagger one expects of him. As the leader of the boy inmates, Frankie Darrow gives a hard-faced performance that is genuinely disturbing. He is a boy prematurely bitter and cynical, prematurely grown out of the ways of boyhood. An excellent diversity of types has been collected for the school's population, and the lads provide many anonymously touching moments.

David Cornelius of DVD Talk writes: "To its credit, the film pushes to make several of its minority characters complex and intelligent, but still, an ugly stereotype is an ugly stereotype..." He believes that Cagney's performance and many of the others are "quite strong".

TimeOut writes: "Cloud nine tosh from the days when Warner movies preached that delinquents were just good kids in need of a helping hand", but concludes that "Despite the risible script, Cagney is as watchable as ever, and Mayo directs sleekly."

== Legacy ==
The film was remade in 1938 as Crime School with Humphrey Bogart taking over James Cagney's role and Hell's Kitchen with Ronald Reagan in 1939.
