= Hit the Road (1941 film) =

1941 American crime comedy film by Joe May

- Directed by: Joe May
- Written by: Robert Lee Johnson; Brenda Weisberg
- Produced by: Ken Goldsmith
- Starring: Gladys George; Barton MacLane; Billy Halop; Huntz Hall
- Cinematography: Jerome Ash
- Edited by: Bernard W. Burton
- Music by: Hans J. Salter
- Production company: Universal Pictures
- Distributed by: Universal Pictures
- Release date: June 27, 1941
- Running time: 61 minutes
- Country: United States
- Language: English

Hit the Road is a 1941 American comedy crime film directed by Joe May and featuring the Dead End Kids and Little Tough Guys alongside Gladys George, Barton MacLane and Evelyn Ankers. It was produced and distributed by Universal Pictures.

== Plot ==
Delinquent gang members Tom, Pig, Ape, and String are trying to break out from the reformatory their confined to, but they are caught and brought to the parole officer Cathy Crookshank. All of the gang members are sons of gangsters, which makes it even harder for them to get paroled. They tell their superintendent this, and that they have no sponsor. To remedy this, Miss Crookshank asks the leader of the boys fathers' gang, Valentine, to come to her office. Valentine is barely released from prison. He is reluctant to help the boys, arguing that he is a reformed man and is now living on a farm with his wife Molly and their daughter Pat. He has also decided to take a new name, "Ryan."

Miss Crookshank explains the boys’ predicament, however, and Valentine agrees to take them in under his wings. One of the younger members of the gang, Pesky, is also taken in by the ex-gangster. The would-be mobsters in reformatory are quite disappointed when they are sent away to the horse-breeding farm in the country instead of out into the city streets. When the boys are transported out to the farm, a gangster named Spike the Butcher, who had killed Valentine's men ten years earlier, follows Valentine to his farm in hopes of finishing the job and kill Valentine too. Spike brings his two henchmen, Creeper and Dingbat, to ambush Valentine/Ryan in his new home. District attorney Paul Revere Smith, who is Pat's boyfriend, arrives at the farm at the same time. Later that day the delinquent boys try to steal Valentine's station wagon, but the car has a flat tire and an old hunting dog gets in the way of the car, spoiling the boys’ plan to escape.

Inspired by Paul's father, Colonel Smith, Valentine raises $50,000 in an effort to build a trade school and give the boys something to do with themselves. Pretending to visit a dentist, Tom goes into the nearby town, where he hopes to plan the gang's escape. It doesn't take long for him to run into Creeper and Dingbat, who take the young man to see Spike. Tom reveals to the gangster about the money raised for the trade school, and Spike suspects it is in fact a "charity racket." When talking to the hardened gangster, Tom suddenly realizes that he is talking to his father's killer. Shaken, Tom goes back to his gang, and they plan to protect the charity money from Spike. Pesky finds them scheming and suspects that the gang will attempt to steal Pat's car. Pesky holds the teenagers at gunpoint until they explain what they are really doing.

The boys are unable to stop Spike and his gang when they run Colonel Smith's car off the road and steal the money. Both cars are wrecked and the gangsters take off on foot. The teenage gang follow them in close pursuit. In the meantime, the Colonel takes Pat's car into town to tell the police. The gangsters manage to get away, and Paul tells Valentine that he now is officially listed as a suspect in the robbery. The police arrive and return the teenagers to Valentine's home. There they are sent upstairs to their rooms, but as soon as they are out of sight from Valentine and the rest of the house members, they find Spike and his gang in Tom's room. Spike has prepared a trap for Valentine, which the family walks right into. The boys are locked in the cellar, along with Molly, Pat, and the house servants.

Valentine manages to talk his old antagonist into hiding out at the farm until the heat blows over. Miss Crookshank arrives, and Spike gets the idea to use her for his plan to escape the farm. The kids manage to break out of the cellar and get into a fight with Spike and his gang. The gangsters are defeated by the boys and the money is recovered. The boys are congratulated by the Colonel for their bravery. The boys are very happy, until they realize that they have saved their own trade school.

== Cast ==
=== The Dead End Kids ===
- Billy Halop as Tom
- Huntz Hall as Pig Grogan
- Gabriel Dell as String
- Bernard Punsley as Ape

=== Additional cast ===
- Gladys George as Molly Ryan
- Barton MacLane as James J. "Valentine" Ryan
- Bobs Watson as "Slugger" Mickey Nolan, a. k. a "Pesky"
- Evelyn Ankers as Patience "Pat" Ryan
- Charles Lang as Paul Revere Smith
- Shemp Howard as Dingbat
- Walter Kingsford as Colonel Smith
- Eily Malyon as Cathy Crookshank
- Edward Pawley as Spike the Butcher
- John Harmon as Creeper
- Charles R. Moore as Martin
- Hally Chester as Trusty
- Ernie Stanton as O'Brien - First Guard
