= Warren Thomas =

American comedian

- Born: Warren Burdette Thomas; June 5, 1958; San Francisco, California
- Died: September 2, 2005; Manhattan, New York
- Occupation: Comedian

Warren Thomas (June 5, 1958 – September 2, 2005) was an American comedian. His greatest fame came during the late 1980s and early 1990s when he was a major figure in the San Francisco comedy scene and began appearing on HBO comedy specials. He had the nick name 'Warranty'. He won the San Francisco International Comedy Competition in 1987. Thomas was cited as the funniest comedian alive by Greg Proops. Because of its speed, rhythm and flow, his comedy was often compared to jazz music. Warren mentored Jamie Foxx and worked with Dave Chappelle. His television appearances included Comedy Central's Comics Come Home special, The Dennis Miller Show, and Late Night with Conan O'Brien and Premium Blend. He was a writer on In Living Color and Air America Radio, and he was a frequent guest on Rocky Sullivan's "Satire for Sanity" show. He also was working on a project with Jamie Foxx.

Upon Thomas's death, memorials were held in his honor in New York City, where he had been living and working, in Los Angeles, and in his hometown of San Francisco. Mourners included his friends Robin Williams, Barry Crimmins, A. Whitney Brown, Janeane Garofalo, Greg Proops, Will Durst, Bob Rubin, Sue Murphy, Tom Rhodes, Randy Kagan, Kurt Weitzmann, David Feldman, Charles Ezell, Barry Lank, Martin Olsen, and Barry Sobel. On the April 9, 2010, episode of HBO's Real Time with Bill Maher, comedian Chris Rock paid tribute to Thomas in the form of a rhetorical question, "Who was funnier than Warren Thomas?"

He was survived by his wife of 7 years January Thomas, his mother, and his 5 siblings.

Thomas was a football and basketball player in high school as well as a lifelong San Francisco 49ers and SF Giants baseball fan.
