= Tough as They Come =

1942 film by William Nigh

Tough As They Come
- Directed by: William Nigh
- Written by: Lewis Amster; Brenda Weisberg
- Produced by: Ken Goldsmith
- Starring: Billy Halop; Huntz Hall; Paul Kelly; Helen Parrish
- Cinematography: Elwood Bredell
- Edited by: Bernard W. Burton
- Music by: Hans J. Salter
- Distributed by: Universal Pictures
- Release date: June 13, 1942
- Running time: 61 minutes
- Country: United States
- Language: English

Tough as They Come is a 1942 Universal film directed by William Nigh and starring the Dead End Kids and the Little Tough Guys.

== Plot ==
Tommy works for an unethical finance company that charges borrowers extremely high interest that is difficult to pay back. As a result, the company repossesses items such as radios, furniture and cars from their debtors. Tommy believes that the company's practices are unfair and collects evidence to bring to the district attorney's office.

== Cast ==
=== Dead End Kids and Little Tough Guys ===
- Billy Halop as Tommy Clark
- Huntz Hall as Pig
- Bernard Punsly as Ape
- Gabriel Dell as String

=== Additional cast ===
- Paul Kelly as Dan Stevens
- Helen Parrish as Ann Wilson
- Ann Gillis as Frankie Taylor
- Virginia Brissac as Mrs. Clark
- John Gallaudet as Mike Taylor

== Production ==
Prior to filming, the Production Code Administration declined the original script, stating that it could not be approved because of the "objectionable element which the script contains is the inference, as at presently written, that all finance and installment companies operate in a rather illegal manner as to the details of transacting their business, and in a brutal manner as to the details in making their collections."
