= Bobby Jordan =

American actor (1923–1965)

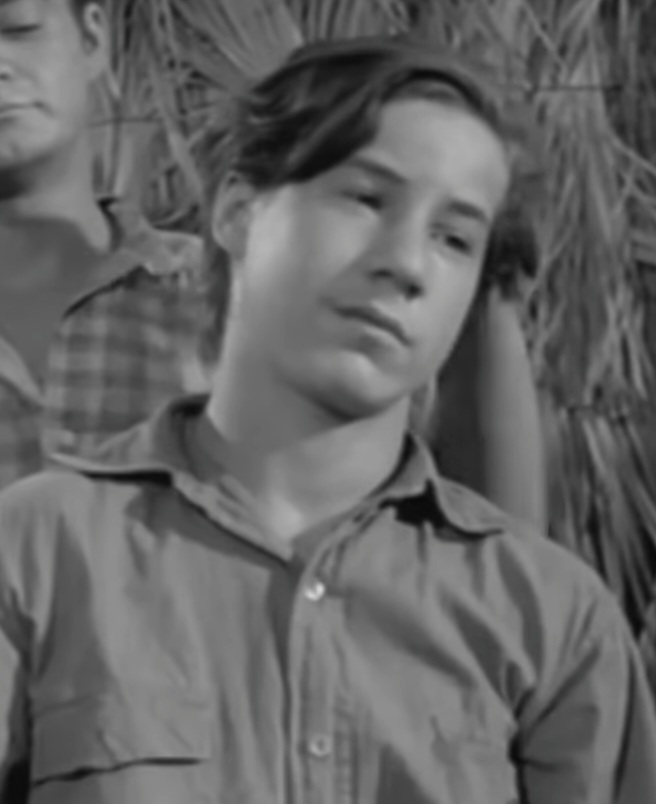
- Jordan in They Made Me a Criminal (1939)
- Born: Robert G. Jordan; April 1, 1923; Harrison, New York, U.S.
- Died: September 10, 1965 (aged 42); Los Angeles, California, U.S.
- Occupation: Actor
- Years active: 1929–1961
- Spouse: Lee Jordan (m. 1946; div. 1957)

Robert G. Jordan (April 1, 1923 – September 10, 1965) was an American actor, most notable for being a member of the Dead End Kids, the East Side Kids, the Little Tough Guys, and the Bowery Boys.

== Early life and career ==
Jordan was born in Harrison, New York. At the age of four, he worked in an early movie version of A Christmas Carol. His mother took him to talent shows in and around Harrison, New York. He also modeled for newspaper and magazine advertisements and appeared in short films and radio programs. In the late 1920s, his family moved to the Upper West Side of Manhattan. In 1929, he was cast as Charles Hildebrand in the 1929 Broadway play Street Scene.

== Dead End Kids and offshoots ==
The youngest of the Dead End Kids, Jordan was the first of the group to work in films (in 1931 at the Vitaphone studio in Brooklyn, alongside future screen teammate David Gorcey). In 1935, he won the role of Angel in Sidney Kingsley's Broadway drama Dead End about life in the slums of the east side of New York City. The play was performed at the Belasco Theatre and ran for three years and more than 600 performances. He appeared for the first season and the beginning of the second but left in mid-November 1936. He returned in time to join the others in 1937 in Hollywood, California to make the movie version of the play, starring Humphrey Bogart, Joel McCrea, Sylvia Sidney, and Claire Trevor.

Following the making of Dead End, the young actors (now known professionally as The Dead End Kids), were released from their contract with Goldwyn, and subsequently they were signed by Warner Bros. After one year, Warners released most of them, but kept Leo Gorcey and Jordan as solo performers. Jordan appeared (as Douglas Fairbanks Rosenbloom) in Warner's Damon Runyon comedy A Slight Case of Murder (1938) and at Metro-Goldwyn-Mayer in Young Tom Edison (1940).

In 1940, Jordan appeared in the movie Military Academy and accepted an offer from producer Sam Katzman to star in a new tough-kid series titled The East Side Kids. Leo Gorcey soon joined him, then Huntz Hall, and the trio continued to lead the series until 1943. Meanwhile, Universal Pictures had launched a competing series, The Little Tough Guys, which gradually recruited most of the original Dead End Kids; Bobby Jordan joined in 1940. When gang leader Billy Halop left the series to join the armed forces, Bobby Jordan replaced him in Keep 'Em Slugging (1943).

Jordan entered the United States Army during World War II as a foot soldier in the 97th Infantry Division. While on furlough he made some fast cash by appearing as himself, in uniform, in the East Side Kids comedy Bowery Champs (1944). He was subsequently involved in an elevator accident that forced him to have surgery to remove his right kneecap.

== Later career and personal life ==
Leo Gorcey abruptly quit the East Side Kids in 1945. Bobby Jordan arranged a meeting with his agent, Jan Grippo, who in turn set up a new production company with Gorcey, Huntz Hall, and Jordan featured in the new Bowery Boys series. After the series began filming, Jordan soon found that Gorcey and Hall were getting the lion's share of both the films' content and salary. (Jordan received only a small fraction of the salary Gorcey was getting.) Dissatisfied with his background status, Jordan left the series after eight entries, and made only a few films thereafter.

He returned to films in 1949 (as Robert Jordan), playing a character role in the low-budget drama Treasure of Monte Cristo. Future assignments were few and far between, and the discouraged actor began drinking heavily. In subsequent years, Jordan worked as a bartender, a bad choice considering his alcoholism. He worked to support his family as a door-to-door photograph salesman and as a roughneck for an oil driller.

He did manage a few roles on television. On July 1, 1957, Jordan played Bob Ford, the assailant of Jesse James, in the television series Tales of Wells Fargo. One of his later performances was in an episode of Bonanza titled "The Many Faces of Gideon Flinch", where he played one of Bullet Head Burke's men.

In 1957, Jordan and his wife divorced; they had one son, Robert Jr.

== Death ==
On August 25, 1965, Jordan entered the Veterans Hospital in Sawtelle, California, for treatment of cirrhosis of the liver. He died on September 10, 1965 at the age of 42. His former Dead End Kids and East Side Kids co-star Leo Gorcey observed in his memoir, "Bobby Jordan must not have had a guardian angel." He was buried at Los Angeles National Cemetery.

== Filmography ==
=== Film (partial) ===
- Kid Millions (1934) as Tourist (uncredited)
- Dead End (1937) as Angel
- A Slight Case of Murder (1938) as Douglas Fairbanks Rosenbloom
- Crime School (1938) as Lester "Squirt" Smith
- Reformatory (1938) as Pinky Leonard
- My Bill (1938) as Reginald Colbrook Jr.
- Angels with Dirty Faces (1938) as Swing
- They Made Me a Criminal (1939) as Angel
- Off the Record (1939) as Mickey Fallon
- Hell's Kitchen (1939) as Joey Richards
- The Angels Wash Their Faces (1939) as Bernie Smith
- Dust Be My Destiny (1939) as Jimmy Glenn
- On Dress Parade (1939) as Cadet Ronny Morgan
- Young Tom Edison (1940) as Joe "Joey" Doyle
- You're Not So Tough (1940) as Rap
- Boys of the City (1940) as Danny Dolan
- Military Academy (1940) as Dick Hill
- That Gang of Mine (1940) as Danny Dolan
- Give Us Wings (1940) as Rap
- Pride of the Bowery (1940) as Danny
- Flying Wild (1941) as Danny Dolan
- Bowery Blitzkrieg (1941) as Danny Breslin
- Spooks Run Wild (1941) as Danny
- Mr. Wise Guy (1942) as Danny Collins
- Let's Get Tough! (1942) as Danny Connors
- Smart Alecks (1942) as Danny Stevens
- Neath Brooklyn Bridge (1942) as Danny Lyons
- Junior Army (1942) as Jockey
- Kid Dynamite (1943) as Danny Lyons
- Keep 'Em Slugging (1943) as Tommy Banning (leading role)
- Clancy Street Boys (1943) as Danny
- Ghosts on the Loose (1943) as Danny
- Destroyer (1943) as Sobbing Sailor (uncredited)
- Adventures of the Flying Cadets (1943, Serial) as Cadet "Jinx" Roberts
- Bowery Champs (1944) as Bobby Jordan
- Live Wires (1946) as Bobby
- In Fast Company (1946) as Bobby
- Bowery Bombshell (1946) as Bobby
- Spook Busters (1946) as Bobby
- Mr. Hex (1946) as Bobby
- The Beginning or the End (1947) as Radioman on Tinian Receiving A-Bomb Message (uncredited)
- Hard Boiled Mahoney (1947) as Bobby
- News Hounds (1947) as Bobby
- Bowery Buckaroos (1947) as Bobby
- Treasure of Monte Cristo (1949) as Tony Torecelli
- The Fat Man (1951) as Ted - Bellhop (uncredited)
- The Eddie Cantor Story (1953) as Customer (uncredited)
- The Man Is Armed (1956) as Thorne

=== Television ===
Year	Series	Role	Notes
1951	Boston Blackie	Waiter	Episode: "The Devil's Daughters"
1951/1952/1958	The Adventures of Wild Bill Hickok	Conductor / Steve Manson / Sandy Smith	3 Episodes
1952	The Unexpected	Unknown	Episode: "Calculated Risk"
1952	Gruen Guild Theater	Unknown	Episode: "For Life"
1952	Fireside Theatre	Unknown	Episode: "A Grand for Grandma"
1955	I Led 3 Lives	Comrade Kapotek	Episode: "Brainwash"
1956	Ford Star Jubilee	Third Sailor	Episode: "High Tor"
1956	Dragnet	Unknown	Episode: "The Big Search"
1957	The Millionaire	Press Agent	Episode: "The Professor Amberson Adams Story"
1957	State Trooper	Ed Howard	Episode: "The Live Shell Game"
1957	Tales of Wells Fargo	Ernest 'Ernie' Handsfelt / Sonny Stillwell / Bob Ford	3 Episodes
1957	Casey Jones	Billy Mapes	Episode: "Storm Warning"
1957/1958	Highway Patrol	Ed / Market Manager	2 Episodes
1958	Richard Diamond, Private Detective	Connie Thorpe	Episode: "The Payoff"
1958	The Adventures of Rin-Tin-Tin	Bart Desay	Episode: "Top Gun"
1958/1959	Maverick	Bank Teller / Willy / Kansas City Hotel Desk Clerk	3 episodes
1959	77 Sunset Strip	Auto Mechanic	Episode: "Not an Enemy in the World"
1959	M Squad	Car Lot Employee	Episode: "Death by Adoption"
1960	The DuPont Show with June Allyson	Willie	Episode: "Once Upon a Knight"
1960	Rawhide	Adair	S2:E28, "Incident of the Murder Steer"
1960	Peter Gunn	Waiter	Episode: "Tramp Steamer"
1961	Michael Shayne	Mel Steele	Episode: "The Body Beautiful"
1961	Route 66	Garage Attendant	Episode: "A Skill for Hunting"
1961	The Roaring 20's	Herbie	Episode: "Royal Tour"
1961	Bonanza	Thug #2	Episode: "The Many Faces of Gideon Flinch"
