= Lewis Seiler =

American film director (1890–1964)

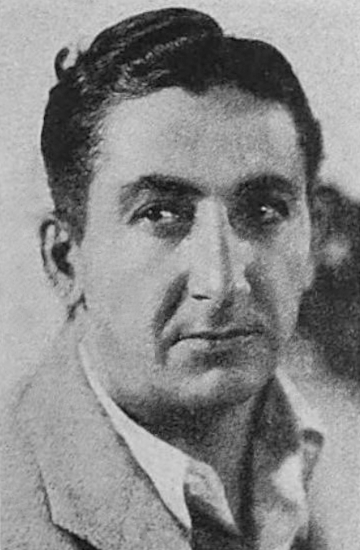
- Born: September 30, 1890; New York City, U.S.
- Died: January 8, 1964 (aged 73); Westwood, California, U.S.
- Occupation: Film director
- Years active: 1923–1958

Lewis Seiler (September 30, 1890 – January 8, 1964) was an American film director. He directed more than 80 films between 1923 and 1958.

Seiler was born in New York City, and died at UCLA Medical Center in Westwood, Los Angeles.

== Partial filmography ==
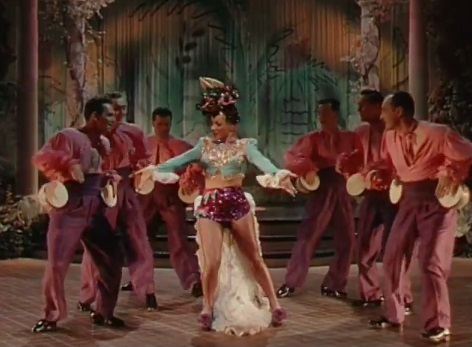
Carmen Miranda in Something for the Boys (1944)

- A Bankrupt Honeymoon (1926)
- The Great K & A Train Robbery (1926)
- No Man's Gold (1926)
- Wolf Fangs (1927)
- The Ghost Talks (1929)
- Girls Gone Wild (1929)
- No Greater Love (1932)
- Frontier Marshal (1934)
- Charlie Chan in Paris (1935)
- He Couldn't Say No (1938)
- Crime School (1938)
- Heart of the North (1938)
- You Can't Get Away with Murder (1939)
- Hell's Kitchen (1939)
- Dust Be My Destiny (1939)
- King of the Underworld (1939)
- Tugboat Annie Sails Again (1940)
- Flight Angels (1940)
- It All Came True (1940)
- South of Suez (1940)
- The Big Shot (1942)
- Beyond the Line of Duty (1942)
- Pittsburgh (1942)
- Guadalcanal Diary (1943)
- Something for the Boys (1944)
- Whiplash (1948)
- The Winning Team (1952)
- The System (1953)
- Women's Prison (1955)
- Battle Stations (1956)
- Over-Exposed (1956)
- The True Story of Lynn Stuart (1958)
