= Gabriel Dell =

American actor (1919-1988)

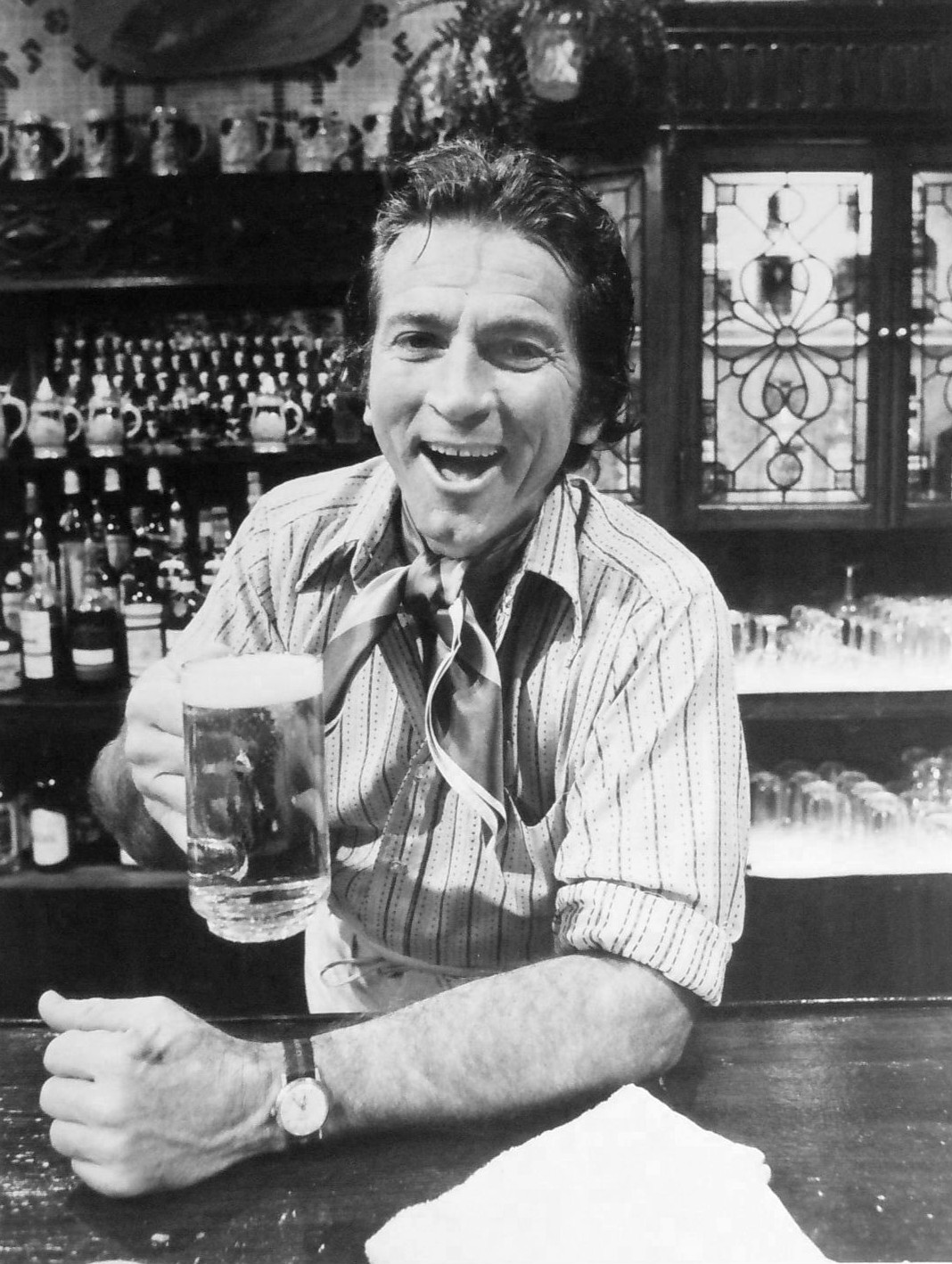
- Dell as Harry Grant in The Corner Bar, 1972.
- Born: Gabriel Marcel Dell Vecchio; October 8, 1919; New York City, US
- Died: July 3, 1988 (aged 68); North Hollywood, California, US
- Occupation: Actor
- Years active: 1934–1982
- Spouse(s): Barbara Dell (m. 19??; div. 1953); Viola Essen (m. 19??; div. 19??)
- Children: 1

Gabriel Dell (born Gabriel Marcel Dell Vecchio; October 8, 1919 – July 3, 1988) was an American actor and one of the members of what came to be known as the Dead End Kids, then later the East Side Kids and finally The Bowery Boys.

== Acting career ==
Born in New York City, Dell almost made his stage debut a few years before Dead End when he and his sister were slated for roles in The Good Earth with Alla Nazimova and Claude Rains. Dell served in the United States Merchant Marine during World War II. He appeared in numerous films as a Dead End Kid/East Side Kid/Bowery Boy. In the 1944 East Side Kids film Million Dollar Kid, Dell appeared as a criminal villain, pitted against the boys, who gets brought to justice in the end.

Dell appeared in the play The Sign in Sidney Brustein's Window, written by Lorraine Hansberry. The production opened on Broadway at the Longacre Theatre on October 15, 1964, and was directed by Peter Kass. Jack Blackman designed scenery, Jules Fisher designed lighting, and Fred Voelpel designed costumes. The original cast featured Dell as Sidney Brustein and Rita Moreno as Iris Parodus Brustein. The play received mixed reviews and closed on January 10, 1965.

Dell starred in Lamppost Reunion as Fred Santora, which opened October 16, 1975. As a result of this performance, he was nominated for a Tony Award for Best Featured Actor in a Play.

His other non-Dead End Kids/Bowery Boys films included The 300 Year Weekend (1971), Who Is Harry Kellerman and Why Is He Saying Those Terrible Things About Me? (1971), Earthquake (1974), and Framed (1975). He also appeared in The Manchu Eagle Murder Caper Mystery (1975), and The Escape Artist (1982). Dell also made several appearances on television shows during the 1960s and 1970s. including Ben Casey, The Fugitive, Mannix, Then Came Bronson, I Dream of Jeannie, McCloud, Sanford and Son, and Barney Miller.

According to differing sources, either Don Francks, Charles Bronson, or Dell was the uncredited actor providing the voice of Boba Fett, a Mandalorian bounty hunter, in the Star Wars Holiday Special.

== Death ==
Dell died in North Hollywood of leukemia in 1988 at age 68.

== Film ==
=== Film ===
Year	Title	Role	Notes
1937	Dead End	T.B.	
1938	Crime School	Bugs	
1938	Little Tough Guy	String	
1938	Angels with Dirty Faces	Pasty	
1939	They Made Me a Criminal	T.B.	
1939	Hell's Kitchen	Ace	
1939	The Angels Wash Their Faces	Luigi	
1939	On Dress Parade	Georgie Warren	
1939	The Right Way	Tom Martin	
1940	You're Not So Tough	String	
1940	Junior G-Men	Terry	
1940	Give Us Wings	String	
1941	Hit the Road	String	
1941	Mob Town	String	
1941	Sea Raiders	Bilge	
1942	Mr. Wise Guy	Charlie Manning	
1942	Junior G-Men of the Air	Stick Munsey	
1942	Let's Get Tough!	Fritz Heinbach	
1942	Tough as They Come	String	
1942	Smart Alecks	Hank	
1942	'Neath Brooklyn Bridge	Skid	
1942	Mug Town	String	
1943	Kid Dynamite	Harry Wycoff	
1943	Keep 'Em Slugging	String	
1943	Mr. Muggs Steps Out	Dips Nolan	
1944	Million Dollar Kid	Lefty	
1944	Follow the Leader	W.W. 'Fingers' Belmont	
1944	Block Busters	Skinny	
1944	Bowery Champs	Jim Lindsay	
1945	Come Out Fighting	Pete	
1946	Spook Busters	Gabe Moreno	
1946	Mr. Hex	Gabe Moreno	
1947	Hard Boiled Mahoney	Gabe Moreno	
1947	News Hounds	Gabe Moreno	
1947	Bowery Buckaroos	Gabe Moreno	
1948	Angels' Alley	Gabe Moreno	
1948	Jinx Money	Gabe Moreno	
1948	Smugglers' Cove	Gabe Moreno	
1948	Trouble Makers	Gabe Moreno	
1949	Fighting Fools	Gabe Moreno	
1949	Hold That Baby!	Gabe Moreno	
1949	Angels in Disguise	Gabe Moreno	
1949	Master Minds	Gabe Moreno	
1950	Blonde Dynamite	Gabe Moreno	
1950	Lucky Losers	Gabe Moreno	
1950	Triple Trouble	Gabe Moreno	
1950	Blues Busters	Gabe Moreno	
1951	Katie Did It	Eddie	Uncredited
1955	Escape from Terror	Col. Tovchenko	
1962	When the Girls Take Over	Henderson	
1971	The 300 Year Weekend	Wynter	
1971	Who Is Harry Kellerman and Why Is He Saying Those Terrible Things About Me?	Sidney Gill	
1974	Earthquake	Sal	
1975	The Manchu Eagle Murder Caper Mystery	Malcolm	
1975	Framed	Vince Greeson	
1982	The Escape Artist	Uncle Burke	

=== Television ===
Year	Title	Role	Notes
1956	Armstrong Circle Theatre	Howard Mukluk Brown	Episode: "Operation Deep Freeze: Crash of the Otter"
1956-1960	The Steve Allen Plymouth Show	Various roles	41 episodes
1963	Naked City	Willie Corbin	Episode: "Man Without a Skin"
1965	Ben Casey	Michael M. Francini	Episode: "Francini? Who is Francini?"
1967	The Fugitive	Chester	Episode: "There Goes the Ball Game"
1967	Mannix	Alan Brewer	Episode: "Coffin for a Clown"
1969	The Governor and J.J.	Dr, Apthecker	Episode: "Cat on a Hot Tin Mansion"
1969	Then Came Bronson	Russ Faber	Episode: "Old Tigers Never Die--They Just Run Away"
1969	CBS Playhouse	Mickey	Episode: "Sadbird"
1970	I Dream of Jeannie	Arvel	Episode: "My Master, the Chili King"
1971	The Name of the Game	Rocco Amato	Episode: "Appointment in Palermo"
1971	McCloud	Ira Mastin	Episode: "Somebody's Out to Get Jennie"
1972	Cutter	Leone	TV film
1972	The Corner Bar	Harry Grant	10 Episodes
1972-73	Sanford and Son	Gunman / Leader	2 episodes
1972	Banyon	Sam Whitney	Episode: "Meal Ticket"
1973	Owen Marshall, Counselor at Law	Matt Hanks	Episode: "An Often and Familiar Ghost"
1974	Nakia	Archie McIntosh	Episode: "No Place to Hide"
1975	Barney Miller	Al Shreiber	Episode: "Vigilante"
1976	Risko	Joe Risko	TV film
1976	Switch	Tony Adams	Episode: "The Things That Belong to Mickey Costello"
1976	Doc	Lindstrom	Episode: "The Westside Clinic and Deli"
1977	Serpico	Shotness	Episode: "Sanctuary"
1977	Star Wars Holiday Special	Boba Fett (voice)	TV special
1977	A Year at the Top	Frederick J. Hanover	Main cast
1979	Legends of the Superheroes	Mordru	2 episodes
