= Mr. Hex =

1946 film by William Beaudine

- Directed by: William Beaudine
- Written by: Jan Grippo (story); Cy Endfield
- Produced by: Jan Grippo; Cy Endfield
- Starring: Leo Gorcey; Huntz Hall; Bobby Jordan; William Benedict; Gabriel Dell
- Cinematography: James S. Brown Jr.
- Edited by: Richard Currier
- Music by: Edward J. Kay
- Distributed by: Monogram Pictures
- Release date: November 9, 1946
- Running time: 63 minutes
- Language: English

Mr. Hex is a 1946 American comedy film directed by William Beaudine and starring the comedy team of The Bowery Boys. It is the fifth film in the series.

== Plot ==
The boys are trying to raise money for their friend Gloria. She has to give up her aspiring singing career in order to stay home and take care of her sick mother. Slip comes up with the idea to hypnotize Sach into thinking he is an unbeatable fighter so that they can enter him into a contest to win $2,500. Meanwhile, Gabe brokers a deal with a crooked nightclub owner to give Gloria the big break she has been waiting for. The nightclub owner then hires a ringer to fight Sach as well as his own hypnotist to counter Slip's control over Sach in order to collect a fortune from everyone who has bet on Sach.

The resulting match has Sach going back and forth from being hypnotized to being aware of reality. In the end Gabe gets shot trying to expose the crooked nightclub owner and wins Gloria's heart. Slip then decides to hypnotize Sach again in order to make him into a wrestler.

== Cast ==
=== The Bowery Boys ===
- Leo Gorcey as Slip Mahoney
- Huntz Hall as Sach Sullivan
- Bobby Jordan as Bobby
- Billy Benedict as Whitey
- David Gorcey as Chuck

=== Remaining cast ===
- Gabriel Dell as Gabe
- Gale Robbins as Gloria
- Ben Weldon as Bull Laguna
- Ian Keith as Raymond
- Sammy Cohen as "Evil-Eye" Fagin
- Bernard Gorcey as Louie
- William Ruhl as Mob Leader
- Danny Beck as Danny the Dip
- Rita Lynn as Mazie
- Joe Gray as Billy Butterworth
- Eddie Gribbon as Blackie
- Meyer Grace as Spud
- Gene Stutenroth as Bill
- John Indrisano as Referee

== Production ==
This is the first film in which Sach is given a last name (Sullivan), however it isn't the familiar name used in latter films of the series (Jones).

== Home media ==
Warner Archives released the film on made-to-order DVD in the United States as part of "The Bowery Boys, Volume Four" on August 26, 2014.

Preceded by Spook Busters; 1946	'The Bowery Boys' movies 1946-1958	Succeeded by Hard Boiled Mahoney; 1947
