= The Angels Wash Their Faces =

1939 film by Ray Enright

- Theatrical release poster
- Directed by: Ray Enright
- Written by: Michael Fessier; Niven Busch; Robert Buckner
- Produced by: Max Siegel
- Starring: Ann Sheridan; Billy Halop; Bernard Punsly; Leo Gorcey; Huntz Hall; Gabriel Dell; Bobby Jordan; Ronald Reagan; Bonita Granville; Frankie Thomas; Henry O'Neill; Eduardo Ciannelli
- Cinematography: Arthur L. Todd
- Edited by: James Gibson
- Music by: Adolph Deutsch
- Distributed by: Warner Bros. Pictures
- Release date: August 26, 1939
- Running time: 86 minutes
- Language: English

The Angels Wash Their Faces is a 1939 Warner Bros. drama film directed by Ray Enright and starring Ann Sheridan, Ronald Reagan and the Dead End Kids.

== Plot ==
Gabe Ryan is released from reform school and is taken to a new house by his sister Joy to start a new life where no one knows of his past. However, Gabe immediately joins the Beale Street Termites gang, and meets gangster William Kroner, who accuses Gabe of starting a fire at one Kroner's his properties. Alfred Martino, the actual arsonist, uses the opportunity to frame Gabe for other fires. He torches one of his apartment complexes so that he can collect the insurance money, but one of the kids named Sleepy is killed in the fire.

Patrick Remson, the assistant district attorney, tries to prove Gabe's innocence. His motives are not only to prove Gabe's innocence but also to get closer to Gabe's sister. Joy has devoted her life to helping Gabe and neglects her other interests such as rallying against city-government corruption, which pleases Martino. However, Gabe is found guilty and sentenced to prison.

The other boys, led by Billy, try to help Gabe. Billy enters a contest for "Boy Mayor For One Week" and wins. He has Kroner arrested for a small infraction--a law about "No bowling allowed on Sundays" is still valid and allows guilty parties to be put in "the stocks". Kroner is pilloried at the site of the arson fire as a jeering crowd gathers. Billy and the rest of the gang interrogate Kroner and try to force him to admit that Gabe is innocent, but Kroner does not budge until he is shown proof that his accomplices, Martino and Hynes, a crooked fire inspector, are planning to leave the country. He confesses and Martino and the chief are arrested and sent to prison.

== Cast ==
=== The Dead End Kids ===
- Billy Halop as Billy Shafter
- Bobby Jordan as Bernie Smith
- Leo Gorcey as Leo Finnegan
- Gabriel Dell as Luigi Batteran
- Huntz Hall as Huntz Gartman
- Bernard Punsly as Luke 'Sleepy' Arkelian

=== Additional cast ===
- Ann Sheridan as Joy Ryan
- Ronald Reagan as Patrick Remson
- Bonita Granville as Peggy Finnegan
- Frankie Thomas as Gabe Ryan
- Margaret Hamilton as Miss Hannaberry
- Marjorie Main as Mrs. Arkelian
- Grady Sutton as Gildersleeve (mayor's secretary)
- Aldrich Bowker as Turnkey
- Cy Kendell as Hynes
- Robert Strange as Simpkins
- Henry O'Neil as Ramson Sr.
- Eduardo Ciannelli as Martino
- Burton Churchill as Mayor Dooley
- Minor Watson as Maloney
- Jackie Searle as Alfred Goonplatz
- Bernard Nedell as Kramer
- Dick Rich as Shuffle
- William Hopper as Photographer (uncredited)
- Charles Trowbridge as Warden at the reform school (uncredited)
- John Hamilton as Officer Merton (uncredited)

== Production ==
The Angels Wash Their Faces was filmed under the title The Battle of the City Hall. It was changed to reference the title of the unrelated film Angels with Dirty Faces, which also starred Ann Sheridan and the Dead End Kids along with James Cagney and Humphrey Bogart and had been released the previous year.

== Reception ==
Variety wrote that although Ray Enright sacrificed "plausibility for action," he had "directed with an eye for the spectacular, including a thrilling fire scene and a dramatic courtroom sequence" and never let "the swift pace ease" while the "screenplay holds no voids in the rapid-fire plot tempo."

== Home media ==
The film was released on DVD by Warner Bros. on November 10, 2010.
