= The Manchu Eagle Murder Caper Mystery =

1975 film by Dean Hargrove

- DVD cover
- Directed by: Dean Hargrove
- Written by: Dean Hargrove; Gabriel Dell
- Produced by: Edward K. Dodds
- Starring: Gabriel Dell; Huntz Hall; Jackie Coogan; Joyce Van Patten; Barbara Harris
- Cinematography: Wilmer C. Butler
- Edited by: Bob Kagey; John Kaufman; Robert Kimble; Buddy Small
- Music by: Dick DeBenedictis
- Production company: Strathmore Productions
- Distributed by: United Artists
- Release date: March 26, 1975
- Running time: 81 minutes
- Country: United States
- Language: English

The Manchu Eagle Murder Caper Mystery is a 1975 comedy-mystery film starring former "Bowery Boys" members Gabriel Dell and Huntz Hall, Jackie Coogan, and Joyce Van Patten. The film is a parody of the 1941 film noir The Maltese Falcon starring Humphrey Bogart. The cast also includes Barbara Harris, Anjanette Comer, Will Geer, Sorrell Booke, Vincent Gardenia, Nita Talbot and Nicholas Colasanto. The film was written by Dell and Dean Hargrove and directed by Hargrove. It was released by United Artists.

== Plot ==
An incompetent mail-order private eye, aided by a chicken hatchery owner, is called upon to solve the murder of the mail-order private eye's nutty milkman, who it is discovered had a secret life where he practiced various animal fetishes.

== Cast ==
- Gabriel Dell as Malcolm
- Huntz Hall as Deputy Roy
- Will Geer as Dr. Simpson
- Anjanette Comer as Arlevia Jessup
- Joyce Van Patten as Ida Mae
- Vincent Gardenia as Big Daddy Jessup
- Barbara Harris as Miss Helen Fredericks
- Sorrell Booke as Dr. Melon
- Dick Gautier as Oscar Cornell
- Jackie Coogan as Detective Chief Anderson
- Nita Talbot as Jasmine Cornell
- Nicholas Colasanto as Bert
- Howard Storm as Freddie Jessup
- Robbi Tremaine as Contestant
- Helen Finley as Laverne
- Old Tom as Bert's Customer
- Winston (dog) as Winston
- Jason Fithian as Manager

== See also ==
- List of American films of 1975
