= Angels with Dirty Faces =

1938 American gangster film

- Original theatrical release poster
- Directed by: Michael Curtiz
- Written by: John Wexley; Warren Duff
- Based on: Angels with Dirty Faces by Rowland Brown
- Produced by: Samuel Bischoff
- Starring: James Cagney; Pat O'Brien; The Dead End Kids; Humphrey Bogart; Ann Sheridan; George Bancroft
- Cinematography: Sol Polito
- Edited by: Owen Marks
- Music by: Max Steiner
- Distributed by: Warner Bros. Pictures
- Release date: November 26, 1938
- Running time: 97 minutes
- Country: United States
- Language: English
- Box office: $1.7 million

Angels with Dirty Faces is a 1938 American gangster film directed by Michael Curtiz for Warner Bros. Pictures. It stars James Cagney, Pat O'Brien, The Dead End Kids, Humphrey Bogart, Ann Sheridan, and George Bancroft. The screenplay was written by John Wexley and Warren Duff based on the story by Rowland Brown. The film chronicles the relationship of the notorious gangster William "Rocky" Sullivan with his childhood friend and now-priest Father Jerry Connolly. After spending three years in prison for armed robbery, Rocky intends to collect $100,000 from his co-conspirator Jim Frazier, a mob lawyer. All the while, Father Connolly tries to prevent a group of youths from falling under Rocky's influence.

Brown wrote the script in August 1937. After pitching the film to a number of studios, he made a deal with Grand National Pictures, who wanted Cagney to star in the lead role. However, the film never came to fruition, owing to Grand National's financial troubles that led to their bankruptcy in 1939. Cagney then returned to Warner the same year, taking Brown's script with him. Warner acquired the story and asked a number of directors to take on the project, eventually settling with Curtiz. Principal photography began in June 1938 at Warner's Burbank studios, and finished a week behind schedule in August, due mostly to the time it took to shoot Rocky's standoff with the police and eventual execution.

Angels with Dirty Faces was released on November 28, 1938, to positive reviews. At the 11th Academy Awards, the film was nominated in three categories: Best Actor (Cagney), Best Director (Curtiz), and Best Story (Brown). Angels with Dirty Faces is widely regarded as a defining moment in Cagney's career, and arguably defined as one of the early forerunners of the film noir genre. It was shortlisted by the American Film Institute in 2008, and was voted 67th in a list of the "100 Best Film Noirs of All Time" by Slant Magazine in 2015.

In 2024, the film was selected for preservation in the United States National Film Registry by the Library of Congress as being "culturally, historically, or aesthetically significant."

== Plot ==
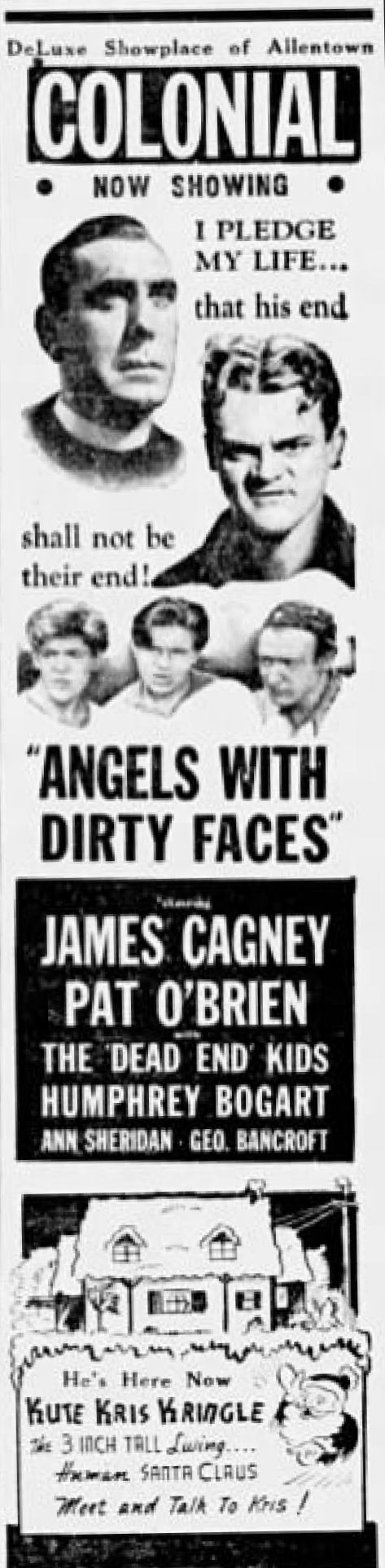
Newspaper ad in 1939

In 1920, two Irish-American youths, Rocky Sullivan and Jerry Connolly, attempt to rob a railroad car carrying fountain pens. Jerry escapes from the police, while Rocky is caught and sentenced to reform school.

Fifteen years later, an older Rocky is arrested for armed robbery. His lawyer and co-conspirator, Jim Frazier, asks him to take the blame for the robbery. In exchange, Frazier will keep Rocky's $100,000 share of the robbery safe until the day Rocky is released. Rocky agrees and is sentenced to three years in prison.

After serving his sentence, Rocky returns to his old neighborhood and visits Jerry, who is now a Catholic priest. He rents a room in a boarding house run by Laury Martin, a girl he bullied as a youth. He then pays a visit to Frazier's casino. Frazier claims to have been unaware of Rocky's release, but he promises to have the $100,000 ready by the end of the week, and he gives Rocky $500 spending money.

After leaving, Rocky is pickpocketed by a gang of young toughs: Soapy, Swing, Bim, Pasty, Crab, and Hunky. After he tracks them down to his old childhood hideout, the tough kids admit they admire Rocky's reputation and criminal lifestyle. After retrieving his wallet and money, Rocky invites them to dinner. While they are eating, Jerry arrives and asks the gang why they have not been playing basketball.

With Rocky's help, Jerry convinces them to play another team. At the match, the kids are very disorganized and fighting with the other team. Rocky takes the boys to task, and they start to follow the rules. As Jerry and Laury watch, Laury expresses her concern over the potential negative influence Rocky may be having on the gang.

Later, Frazier's hit squad makes an attempt on Rocky's life. Rocky easily spots his tail and outwits the mobsters' attempted hit. In retaliation, he kidnaps Frazier, raiding his house at gunpoint and stealing $2,000 and a ledger. Rocky then approaches Frazier's business partner, Mac Keefer, and requests $100,000 in trade for Frazier's release. Mac pays, but as Rocky leaves, he informs on him to the police. Rocky is arrested and begins mocking the police for their lack of evidence. Frazier informs Mac that Rocky is in possession of the ledger. This forces Frazier to tell the police it was all a "misunderstanding", and Rocky is released. Jerry learns of the kidnapping and decides to go to the press to expose corruption in New York.

On the radio, Jerry denounces the corruption, as well as Rocky, Frazier, and Keefer. Frazier and Keefer assure Rocky that no harm will come to Jerry, but he discovers that they plan to kill both him and Jerry. To protect his friend, Rocky kills Frazier and Keefer instead and makes his way to an abandoned warehouse, where he kills a police officer and a standoff ensues.

Jerry arrives and convinces the police that he can reason with Rocky and get him to surrender. Upon entering the warehouse, Jerry sees a trapped Rocky and implores him to surrender, but Rocky takes Jerry hostage. While trying to escape, Rocky is shot in the leg and captured. After standing trial, he is sentenced to death.

Jerry visits Rocky just before his execution. He sees the negative impact Rocky could have on the Dead End Kids and asks him to beg for mercy on his way to the death house, saying it would ruin the gang's romantic image of the gangster lifestyle. Rocky refuses, telling Jerry that his reputation is all that he has left.

As they enter the execution room, Rocky shakes Jerry's hand and wishes him well before walking to the electric chair. Suddenly, Rocky breaks down, begging and screaming for mercy, and seemingly dies a coward's death. Later, Soapy and the gang read newspaper reports of how Rocky "turned yellow" in the face of his execution. The gang no longer knows what to think about Rocky or the criminal lifestyle. Jerry asks them to join him in a prayer for "a boy who couldn't run as fast as I could".

== Cast ==
- James Cagney as William "Rocky" Sullivan, a notorious gangster, who just got out of prison.
  - Frankie Burke as Rocky (As a Boy)
- Pat O'Brien as Fr. Jerry Connolly, a Catholic priest, who has been Rocky's friend since childhood.
  - William Tracy as Jerry (As a Boy)
- Humphrey Bogart as Jim Frazier, a crooked lawyer associated with organized crime, who owes Rocky $100,000.
- Ann Sheridan as Laury Martin, Rocky's love interest, who has known him and Father Connolly since childhood.
  - Marilyn Knowlden as Laury (As a Child)
- George Bancroft as Mac Keefer, a businessman and municipal contractor in league with Frazier.
- The "Dead End" Kids as the neighborhood boys who idolize Rocky.
  - Billy Halop as Soapy, their leader
  - Bobby Jordan as Swing
  - Leo Gorcey as Bim
  - Gabriel Dell as Pasty
  - Huntz Hall as Crab
  - Bernard Punsly as Hunky
- Joe Downing as Steve
- Adrian Morris as Blackie, a gangster who follows and tries to kill Rocky.
- Emory Parnell as Officer McMann (uncredited)

== Production ==
=== Development ===
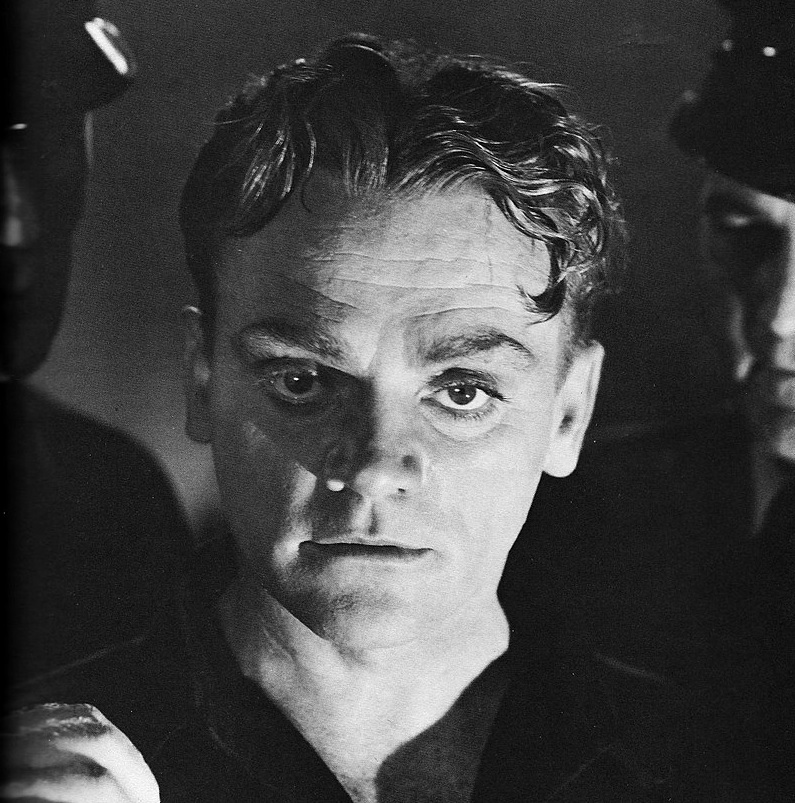
Cagney in his iconic final walk

Rowland Brown wrote the scenario for Angels with Dirty Faces in August, 1937. He was known in Hollywood for writing and directing a number of crime films in the early 1930s, including The Doorway to Hell (Note: Cagney had a supporting role in The Doorway to Hell.) and Quick Millions. He presented the story to Mervyn LeRoy, who was keen to direct a "vehicle" starring the Dead End Kids, a group of young actors from New York. Brown and LeRoy tried unsuccessfully to negotiate a fee for the scenario.

Brown then began pitching the film to other studios, and eventually made a deal with Grand National Pictures, who wanted James Cagney to star in the lead role. By the end of 1935, it became apparent to Cagney and his business manager brother, William, that Warner Bros. Pictures were only interested in paying him a "very small percentage of the income dollar derived" from his work. Therefore, Cagney had no choice and walked away until a better arrangement with Warner could be made. After filing a lawsuit to "rectify the inequalities," Cagney started working for Grand National Pictures, a small studio compared to Warner.

At the time he was offered the role of Rocky Sullivan, Cagney had already made one film for Grand National, Great Guy, but fearing he would be typecast in "tough guy" roles, as he had been at Warner, Cagney turned down the role and opted to star in Something to Sing About. The film's budget grew to an astronomical $900,000, and, on its release, did not fare well at the box office. Its underperformance is believed to have been a contributing factor in the 1939 bankruptcy of Grand National.

Following Something to Sing About, Cagney returned to Warner after reaching a better deal with them. At his brother's insistence, he took Brown's story with him and presented it to the studio. Warner acquired the story and then asked a number of directors to take on the project. LeRoy was the first, and although he showed interest, he was unable to commit because he was making films for MGM; Warner then asked Brown, who showed no interest at all; and finally, Michael Curtiz, who accepted their offer.

=== Casting ===
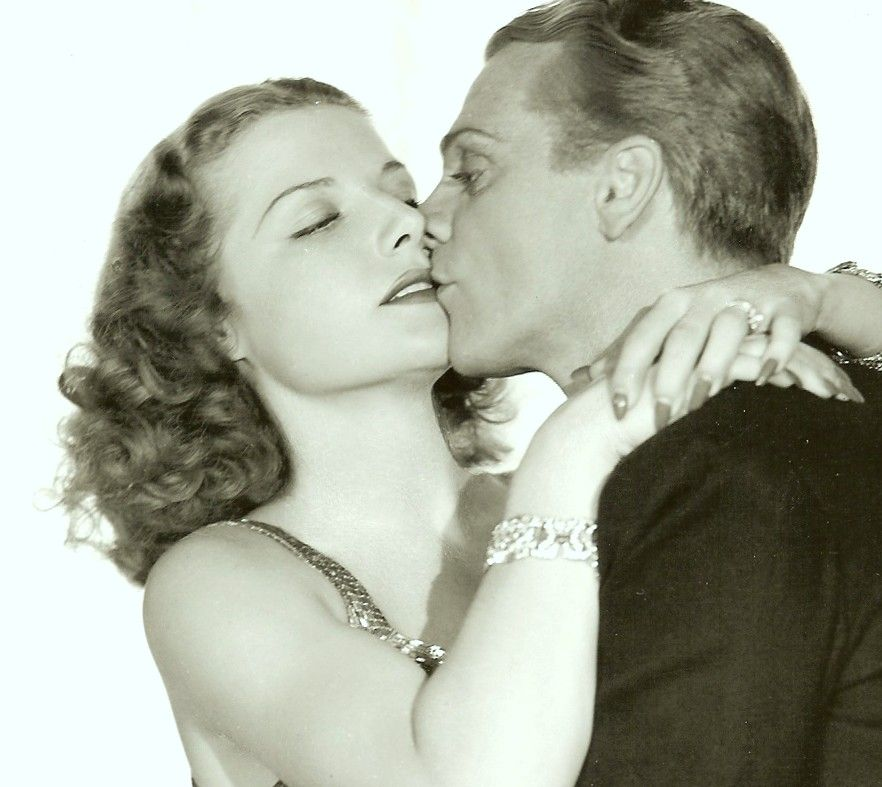
Sheridan and Cagney, circa. 1938

Although Cagney had been convinced that he would never agree to play the role of a coward being dragged to his execution, he became enthusiastic about portraying Rocky, seeing it as an opportunity to prove that his acting range extended beyond tough guy roles. To play Rocky, Cagney drew on his memories of growing up in the Yorkville section of Manhattan, New York. His main inspiration was a drug-addicted pimp, who stood on a street corner all day hitching his trousers, twitching his neck, and repeating: "Whadda ya hear! Whadda ya say!".

Those mannerisms came back to haunt Cagney, who later wrote in his autobiography: "I did those gestures maybe six times in the picture. That was over thirty years ago—and the impressionists have been doing me doing him ever since." Cagney's other inspiration was his childhood friend, Peter "Bootah" Hessling, who was convicted of murder and executed by electric chair on July 21, 1927. The night Bootah was executed, Cagney was playing in a Broadway performance, and wept on hearing of his death.

Pat O'Brien was cast as Father Jerry Connolly, Rocky's childhood friend. O'Brien had been a contract player with Warner Bros. since 1933, and eventually left the studio in 1940 following a dispute over the terms of his renewal contract. He and Cagney first met in 1926 in Asbury Park, New Jersey. O'Brien was a "lonely, young" actor "playing in a stock company". He heard the stage play Women Go on Forever (by Mary Boland) was coming to Asbury Park and on its way to Broadway. Wanting to meet the star of the show, he went backstage after a performance and met Cagney for the first time. O'Brien and Cagney became great friends and remained so until the former's death in 1983. Cagney died only three years later.

By May 1938, the Dead End Kids had already starred in Samuel Goldwyn's Dead End; as well as Warner's Crime School (Note: Crime School was released six months before Angels with Dirty Faces.) (both with Humphrey Bogart). They had signed a two-year contract with Goldwyn in 1937, but he sold the contract to Warner Bros. the same year because of their behavior on the set of Dead End; in one instance, they "jumped" Bogart and "stole his pants" while in another they crashed a truck into a soundstage. Bogart portrays the crooked lawyer Jim Frazier in Angels With Dirty Faces. German scholar Winfried Fluck described Bogart's character, Jim Frazier, as an "entirely negative" and "thoroughly bad figure," in "contrast" with Cagney's antihero.

=== Writing ===
Brown's story was revised a number of times by John Wexley and Warren Duff. They provided "powerful treatments," but as with many of the "catch-as-catch-can" pictures of the time, the screenplay was considered insubstantial. Cagney later recalled: "the actors had to patch up [the script] here and there by improvising right on the set".

=== Filming ===
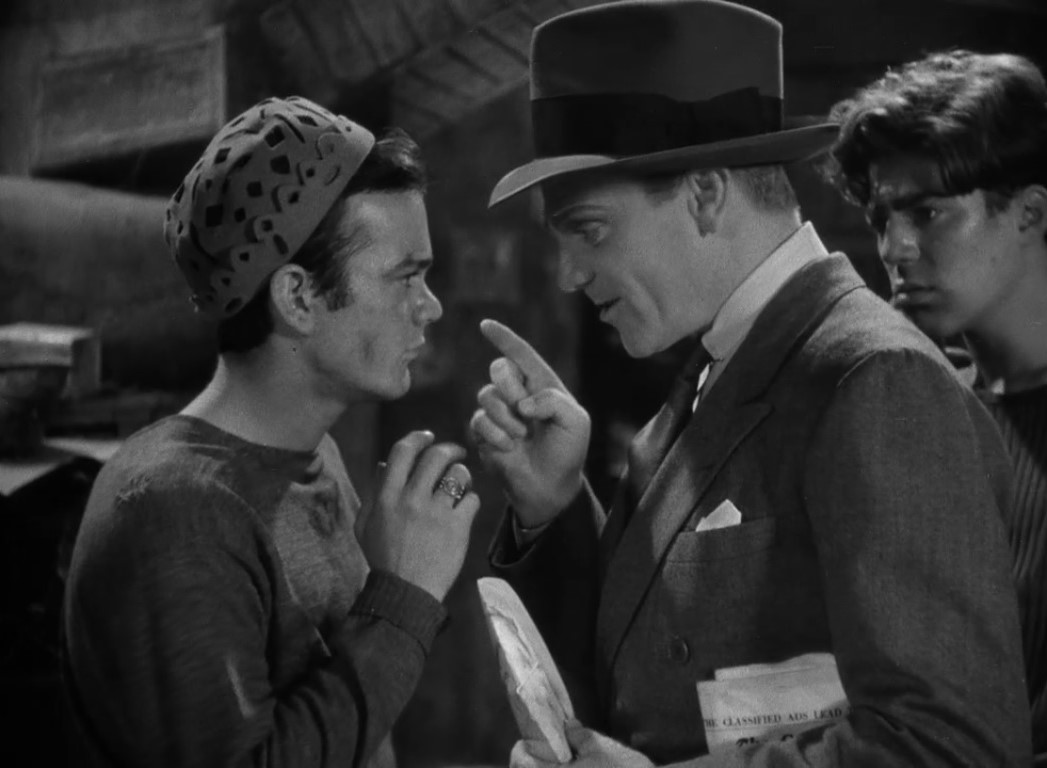
Gorcey (left) and Cagney (right) in the basement scene, with Billy Halop in the background

Principal photography began in June 1938 at Warner's Burbank studios, and finished a week behind schedule in August, due mostly to the time it took to shoot the scenes of Rocky's gunfight with police and his execution.

Cagney's opening scene with the Dead End Kids took place in the basement of a deserted building. By this time, the Dead End Kids "had been throwing their weight around quite a bit with [other] directors and actors". As the scene was being shot, Leo Gorcey jokingly ad-libbed "he's psychic!, thereby throwing the rhythm of the scene right out the window, souring the whole thing very nicely". So in the next take, just before he said "come here, suckers," Cagney "stiff arm[ed Gorcey] right above the nose. His head went back [and hit] the kid behind him, stunning them both momentarily." Huntz Hall saw Gorcey being hit, and later recalled in 1978: "Leo hated [Cagney] for the rest of his life" after the incident.

While filming Rocky's shootout with the police, one scene called for Cagney to be "right at the opening" as machine-gun bullets took out the windows above his head. At this point in his career, Cagney had experience with the unpredictability of using live gunfire and he later recalled that either "common sense or a hunch" made him cautious. He told Curtiz to "[shoot the scene] in process," and as he got out of the way, "Burke, the professional machine gunner, fired the shots". One of the bullets deflected hitting "the steel edge of the window," and going "right through the wall" where Cagney's head had been. This experience convinced Cagney that "flirting this way with real bullets was ridiculous".

Rocky's execution was shot at the Sing Sing Correctional Facility. The death house featured in the film was designed by state architect Lewis Pilcher. It went into service in February 1922. For years, viewers have wondered if Rocky really turns yellow as he is being strapped into the electric chair, or if he is faking it in order to keep his promise to Jerry. Cagney later said: "In looking at the film, it is virtually impossible to say which course Rocky took—which is just the way I wanted it. I played [the role] with deliberate ambiguity so that the spectators can [form their own opinions]. It seems to me it works out fine in either case."

== Release ==
=== Theatrical ===
The film premiered on November 26, 1938, at the Majestic Theater in Reno, Nevada. Angels with Dirty Faces grossed $1.7 million from the worldwide box office, and is said to have been a financial success. Analysts claim that if it were not for Angels with Dirty Faces and two other films directed by Curtiz that year (The Adventures of Robin Hood and Four Daughters), Warner Bros. would have lost a considerable amount of money, resulting in negative turnover for the company's 1938 fiscal year.

=== Home media ===
In 1983, Angels with Dirty Faces was released on VHS and Betamax by CBS/Fox Video. In February 2005, a digitally-remastered version of the film was released on DVD. The release was part of the "James Cagney Collection", in which a number of special bonus features were made available, including: audio commentary by film historian Dana Polan, an "Angels with Dirty Faces: Whaddya Hear? Whaddya Say?" featurette, a radio production, film trailers, and a short film titled "Warner Night at the Movies" with film critic and historian Leonard Maltin. In December 2021, Warner Archive Collection released a Blu-ray version of film, newly restored in HD using a 4K scan from the original camera negative, accompanied by all the same bonus material from the 2005 DVD release.

=== Adaptations in other media ===
Angels with Dirty Faces has been adapted into two radio plays. The first was the May 22, 1939, broadcast of Lux Radio Theater, with Cagney and O'Brien reprising their film roles; the second on the September 19, 1941, broadcast of the Philip Morris Playhouse, starring Sylvia Sidney. In 1995, an Indian version of the film was released, called Ram Jaane. It starred Shahrukh Khan as Rocky, and carried out the original story from start to finish, albeit Indianized.

== Critical reception ==
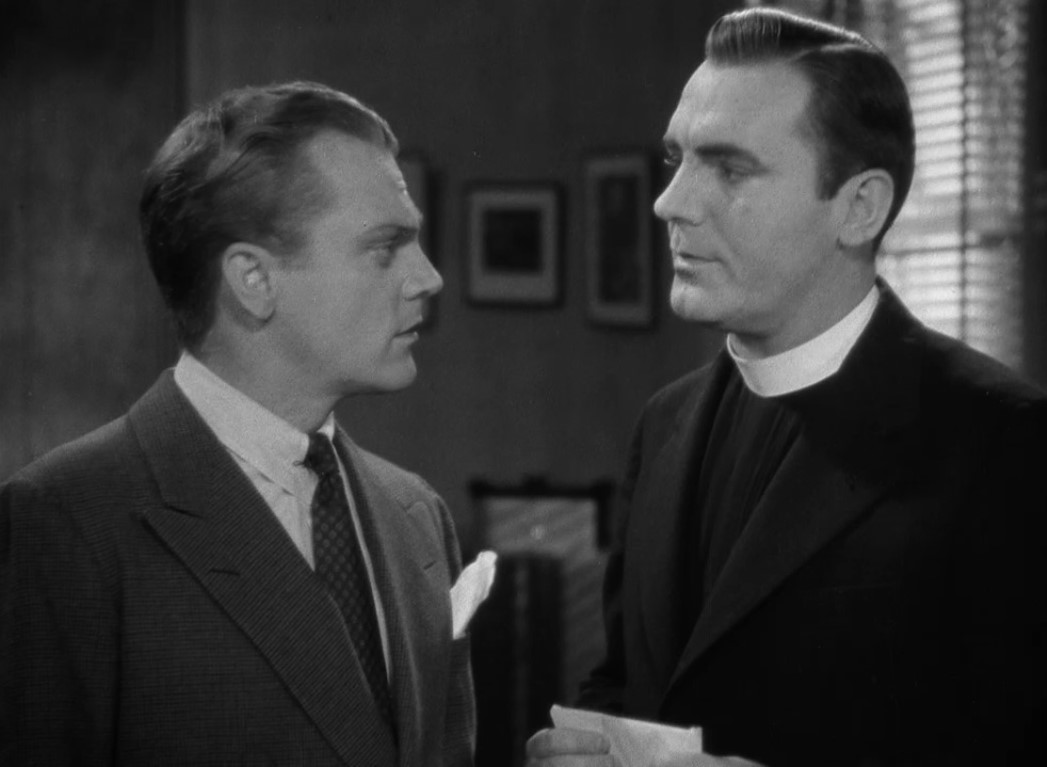
James Cagney and Pat O'Brien

=== Initial reactions ===
Angels with Dirty Faces was met with critical acclaim upon release. Frank Nugent, of The New York Times, attended the world premiere in Nevada, and called the film a "savage melodrama" offering "Cagney at his best". The New York-based motion picture journal Harrison's Reports had similar views. In a review dated November 5, 1938, they called the film a "powerful gangster melodrama," and said it is "one of the most thrilling pictures produced in some time." The "acting, particularly by James Cagney, is brilliant".

On the other hand, Hobe Morrison of Variety was less enthused stating "On the strength of the Cagney–O'Brien combo, Angels should do fair business, but the picture itself is no bonfire. That 'Dead End' kid story has already been told too many times." and "Although the deathhouse scene itself is a harrowing one, that simulated cowardice angle, seems completely implausible...It's a novel twist to a commonplace story, but it's thoroughly hokey".

=== Accolades ===
Cagney won two awards for Best Actor from the National Board of Review and the New York Film Critics Circle. Angels with Dirty Faces was nominated for three awards at the 11th Academy Awards ceremony: Best Actor (for Cagney), Best Director (for Curtiz), and Best Writing (for Brown).

List of awards and nominations
Date of ceremony	Award	Category	Recipient(s)	Result	Ref(s)
February 23, 1939	Academy Awards	Best Director	Michael Curtiz	Nominated	
February 23, 1939	Academy Awards	Best Actor	James Cagney	Nominated	
February 23, 1939	Academy Awards	Best Writing (Original Story)	Rowland Brown	Nominated	
December 15, 1938	National Board of Review Awards	Best Actor	James Cagney	Won	
January 3, 1939	New York Film Critics Circle Awards	Best Actor	James Cagney	Won	

=== Contemporary consensus ===
The review aggregator website Rotten Tomatoes reports 100% of critics have given the film a positive review based on 24 reviews, with an average rating of 8.3/10. The site's critics consensus reads: "James Cagney's explosive charisma and Pat O'Brien's steadfast decency are a match made in heaven in this touching battle for a community's soul."

In his 1973 book James Cagney, Andrew Bergman wrote: "If there is one Cagney film to place in a time capsule, in order to understand his appeal and import, it just might be Angels with Dirty Faces. Not merely one of his truly virtuoso performances, the role of Rocky Sullivan is a kind of summation of the appeal of the gangster to American audiences in the thirties."

In 2005, Slant Magazine's Jeremiah Kipp praised Angels with Dirty Faces for being Warner's "best gangster movie". Awarding four out of four stars, Kipp said: "Rocky Sullivan embodies all the qualities we love about bad guys." Cagney "offers a real intensity and a sense of playfulness," even as he shoots "fellow gangsters" dead. The final, "climactic" scene of "cowardice is unparalleled in gangster movies, and the more Cagney begs and screams, the more [we are] amazed at how he reduces the hero worship of gangsters to nothing. [The film marks] Cagney's finest hour in a career filled with great performances." In 2009, film critic Emanuel Levy wrote of the film: "A shrewd and slick picture, Angels with Dirty Faces was popular entertainment that benefited from the presence of stars, the intriguing characters they play, and the morality (message) that comes at the tale's conclusion." Anthony Sloman of Radio Times gave the film a score of five out of five stars, complimenting its cast and Curtiz's direction, and calling it "the definitive Warner Bros. gangster movie, starring James Cagney in his image-defining role. It's a fast-paced, gritty melodrama, which, though much copied and even parodied, has never been bettered."

== Legacy ==
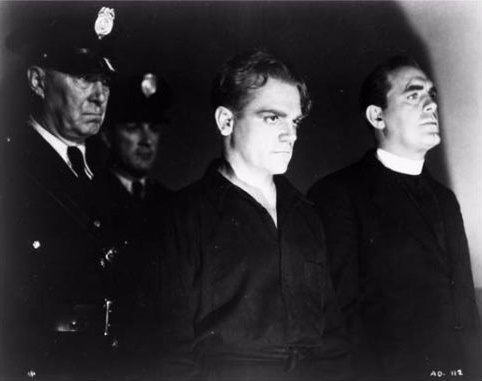
James Cagney and Pat O'Brien in the endlessly debated final walk

Angels with Dirty Faces is considered by some to be one of the finest films in Cagney's career, and a "true example of brilliant American cinema." In 2008, it was shortlisted by the American Film Institute for selection in its list of the top 100 movies of the last 100 years. In 2013, Steven Van Zandt named it as one of his "most favorite mob movies" in an article for Rolling Stone. In 2015, Slant Magazine named it 67th in a list of the "100 Best Film Noirs of All Time".

Over the years, the film has inspired a number of parodies. In 1939, Warner Bros. released a cartoon short spoofing their "cycle" of crime films; the cartoon's title, Thugs with Dirty Mugs, is a direct pun on Angels with Dirty Faces. In the early 1990s, parodies appeared in the form of films within a film in Home Alone (which itself was inducted in the National Film Registry the year prior to Angels with Dirty Faces' induction) and its sequel, Home Alone 2: Lost in New York. These parodies are called Angels with Filthy Souls and Angels with Even Filthier Souls. The former of the two later reappeared in the film Detective Pikachu.

In an episode of Sesame Street, a segment entitled Monsters with Dirty Faces features "Officer Grover showing a gang leader named Rocky how to effectively wash his face." The film's plot inspired an episode of Batman: The Animated Series called It's Never Too Late. The British sketch comedy TV series Hale and Pace parodied the film in a sketch titled Angels with Big Trousers, with Norman Pace playing "James Cagney as Rocky Pantaloon" and Gareth Hale playing "Somebody O'Brien as the Irishman."

Sham 69, an English punk rock group, had a hit single called "Angels with Dirty Faces" in 1978. Frontman Jimmy Pursey was inspired to write the song after watching Cagney in the film one evening with his friend, Chrissie. The Pillows also have a song based on the film titled "I Want to Be Sullivan," and features a sample taken from the film in the song's intro. Alternative Rock band, Sum 41, recycled the film's name as a title for a song on their third album, "Chuck". Irish rock band The Script mention the movie in the lyrics of their song “Broken Arrow” from their album #3.

A bar in New York City was called "Rocky Sullivan's Pub", named after Cagney's character in the film.

Irish-American poet Michael Lally published a collection called Rocky Dies Yellow (1975), featuring a still from the film on the cover.

In Philippines, it was remade as Asero (1995) by Joey Del Rosario which started Cesar Montano and Ricky Davao.

== See also ==
- 1938 in film
- List of films with a 100% rating on Rotten Tomatoes
