= Little Tough Guy =

1938 film by Harold Young

- Original theatre lobby card
- Directed by: Harold Young
- Screenplay by: Gilson Brown; Brenda Weisberg
- Story by: Brenda Weisberg
- Produced by: Ken Goldsmith
- Starring: Little Tough Guys
- Cinematography: Elwood Bredell
- Edited by: Philip Cahn
- Music by: Charles Previn
- Production company: Universal Pictures
- Distributed by: Universal Pictures
- Release date: July 22, 1938 (U.S.)
- Running time: 86 minutes
- Country: United States
- Language: English

Little Tough Guy is a 1938 American crime film that starred several of the Dead End Kids. In the follow-up films, the studio began using the group name The Little Tough Guys, and later The Dead End Kids and Little Tough Guys. This was the first of several films and serials that Universal made using several of the "Kids", whom they borrowed from Warner Bros.

Little Tough Guy is in the public domain.

== Plot ==
Johnny Boylan's father was sentenced to death for a crime that he was never fully proven to have committed. He and his family move to a poorer section of the East Side in New York City. His sister, Kay dances in a burlesque theater after she is fired from her job. Her former fiancé, Paul Wilson, still cares for and wants to help her, but she avoids him out of shame.

Johnny tries to enlist his fellow newsboy friends to help prove his father's innocence. They try to convince the judge, but are unsuccessful. In frustration, Johnny tosses a brick through the judge's car window, which begins his life of crime. He enlists his friend "Pig" to help him rob a drugstore. They are subsequently chased by the police and hide out. The cops find them and Pig begs Johnny to surrender. Pig leaves the store and is shot dead by police. Johnny is captured and sent to reform school.

== Cast ==
The Dead End Kids

- Billy Halop as Johnny Boylan
- Huntz Hall as "Pig"
- Gabriel Dell as "String"
- Bernard Punsly as "Ape"
- David Gorcey as "Sniper"
- Hally Chester as "Dopey"

Additional cast

- Robert Wilcox as Paul Wilson
- Helen Parrish as Kay Boylan
- Marjorie Main as Mrs. Boylan
- Jackie Searl as Cyril Gerrard
- Peggy Stewart as Rita Belle
- Helen MacKellar as Mrs. Wanamaker
- Edward Pawley as Jim Boylan
- Olin Howland as Baxter
- Pat C. Flick as Peddler

== Home media ==
The film was released on DVD on July 22, 2003.
