= Crime School =

1938 film by Lewis Seiler

- Theatrical release poster
- Directed by: Lewis Seiler
- Written by: Crane Wilbur; Vincent Sherman
- Produced by: Bryan Foy
- Starring: Humphrey Bogart; Gale Page; Dead End Kids
- Cinematography: Arthur Todd
- Edited by: Terry Morse
- Music by: Max Steiner
- Production company: Warner Bros. Pictures
- Distributed by: Warner Bros. Pictures
- Release date: May 28, 1938
- Running time: 86 minutes
- Country: United States
- Language: English

Crime School is a 1938 American crime drama film directed by Lewis Seiler and starring the Dead End Kids, Humphrey Bogart and Gale Page. It was produced and distributed by Warner Bros. Pictures.

== Plot ==
A junk dealer does business with the Dead End Kids: Frankie, Squirt, Spike, Goofy, Fats, and Bugs. When the boys ask for a $20 payoff, he counters with an offer of only $5. Spike flies into a rage and bludgeons him in the head, knocking him unconscious. The kids are arrested and brought trial, where the judge sentences all of them to reform school after they refuse to confirm which one struck the blow.

The harsh warden of the reformatory, Morgan, inflicts discipline at the school and flogs Frankie after he tries to escape. The superintendent of the state reformatories, Mark Braden, visits the school and finds evidence of Morgan's subtle cruelty, as in feeding his new inmates poor-quality food. He then visits Frankie in the hospital ward, finding him untreated and the doctor inebriated. As a way of starting over, he fires the doctor, Morgan, and four ex-convict guards, while retaining the head guard, Cooper. Braden takes charge of the reformatory himself and wins over the boys' cooperation by considerate treatment, while romancing Frankie's sister, Sue Warren.

Meanwhile, Cooper is afraid that Braden will learn of Morgan's embezzlement of the food budget, which would implicate him as well. He learns that Spike is the one who dealt the blow to the junk dealer and blackmails him. He gets him to tell Frankie that Braden's generous treatment is due to his sister's acceptance of Braden's attentions. Although untrue, it leads the kids to escape from the school in Cooper's car with his gun. They go to Sue's apartment, and Frankie climbs the fire escape with the gun to confront Braden, but Sue and Braden dispel Frankie's suspicions.

Meanwhile, Cooper "discovers" that the kids have escaped, and Morgan calls the press to discredit Braden and get him fired. However, Braden drives the boys back to the reformatory and gets them into their beds, before the Commissioner, alerted by Morgan, arrives for an inspection with the police in tow. Their plot foiled and their fraud uncovered, Morgan and Cooper are arrested. The boys are subsequently paroled into the care of their parents.

== Cast ==
=== The Dead End Kids ===
- Billy Halop as Frankie Warren
- Bobby Jordan as Lester "Squirt" Smith
- Huntz Hall as Richard "Goofy" Slade
- Leo Gorcey as Charles "Spike" Hawkins
- Bernard Punsly as George "Fats" Papadopoulos
- Gabriel Dell as Timothy "Bugs" Burke

=== Additional cast ===
- Humphrey Bogart as Deputy Commissioner Mark Braden
- Gale Page as Sue Warren
- George Offerman Jr. as Red
- Weldon Heyburn as Cooper
- Cy Kendall as Morgan
- Charles Trowbridge as Judge Clinton
- Spencer Charters as Old Doctor
- Donald Briggs as New Doctor
- Frank Jaquet as Commissioner
- Helen MacKellar as Mrs. Burke
- Al Bridge as Mr. Burke
- Sibyl Harris as Mrs. Hawkins
- Paul Porcasi as Nick Papadopoulos
- Frank Otto as Junkie
- Ed Gargan as Officer Hogan
- James B. Carson as Schwartz
- Hally Chester as Boy

== Background ==
- As this was a Warner Bros. Pictures film and not a United Artists' film like Dead End, they advertised the kids as 'The Crime School Kids' in this film, and their next, Angels with Dirty Faces. However, the name did not catch on and they remained 'The Dead End Kids'.
- Before the film was released, Halop, Dell, Hall, and Punsly were released from their contracts by Warner Brothers and they went on to make a film at Universal, Little Tough Guy. The success of this film caused Warner to reconsider and they were rehired at a substantial raise.
- The Dead End Kids received top billing over Humphrey Bogart for Crime School, with their typeface also larger than Bogart's in posters and advertising.

== Home media ==
The Warner Archive Collection released the film on made to order DVD in the United States on August 4, 2009.
