= Junior Army =

1942 film directed by Lew Landers

- Directed by: Lew Landers
- Written by: Paul Gangelin
- Produced by: Colbert Clark
- Starring: Freddie Bartholomew; Billy Halop; Huntz Hall
- Cinematography: Charles Edgar Schoenbaum
- Edited by: Mel Thorsen
- Production company: Columbia Pictures
- Release date: November 26, 1942 (US)
- Running time: 70 minutes
- Country: United States
- Language: English

Junior Army is a 1942 American film directed by Lew Landers, starring Freddie Bartholomew, Billy Halop, and Huntz Hall, and released by Columbia Pictures.

== Plot ==
An English refugee, Freddie Hewlett, saves Jimmie Fletcher's life during an altercation with gang leader Bushy Thomas. He then proceeds to try to make a reformed man out of him.

== Cast ==
- Freddie Bartholomew as Freddie Hewlett
- Billy Halop as James Fletcher
- Huntz Hall as Bushy Thomas
- Bobby Jordan as Jockey
- Boyd Davis as Maj. E.C. Carter
- William Blees as Cadet Capt. Wesley Rogers
- Richard Noyes as Cadet Sgt. Sable
- Joseph Crehan as Mr. Jeffrey Ferguson
- Don Beddoe as Saginaw Jake
- Charles Lind as Cadet Pell
- Billy Lechner as Cadet Baker
- Peter Lawford as Cadet Wilbur
- Rudolph Anders as Horner - Nazi Saboteur

== Cultural impact ==
The film is one of the earliest attempts to portray juveniles in a positive light during World War II.
