= Rocky Sullivan's =

Coordinates: 40.67320°N 74.01192°W

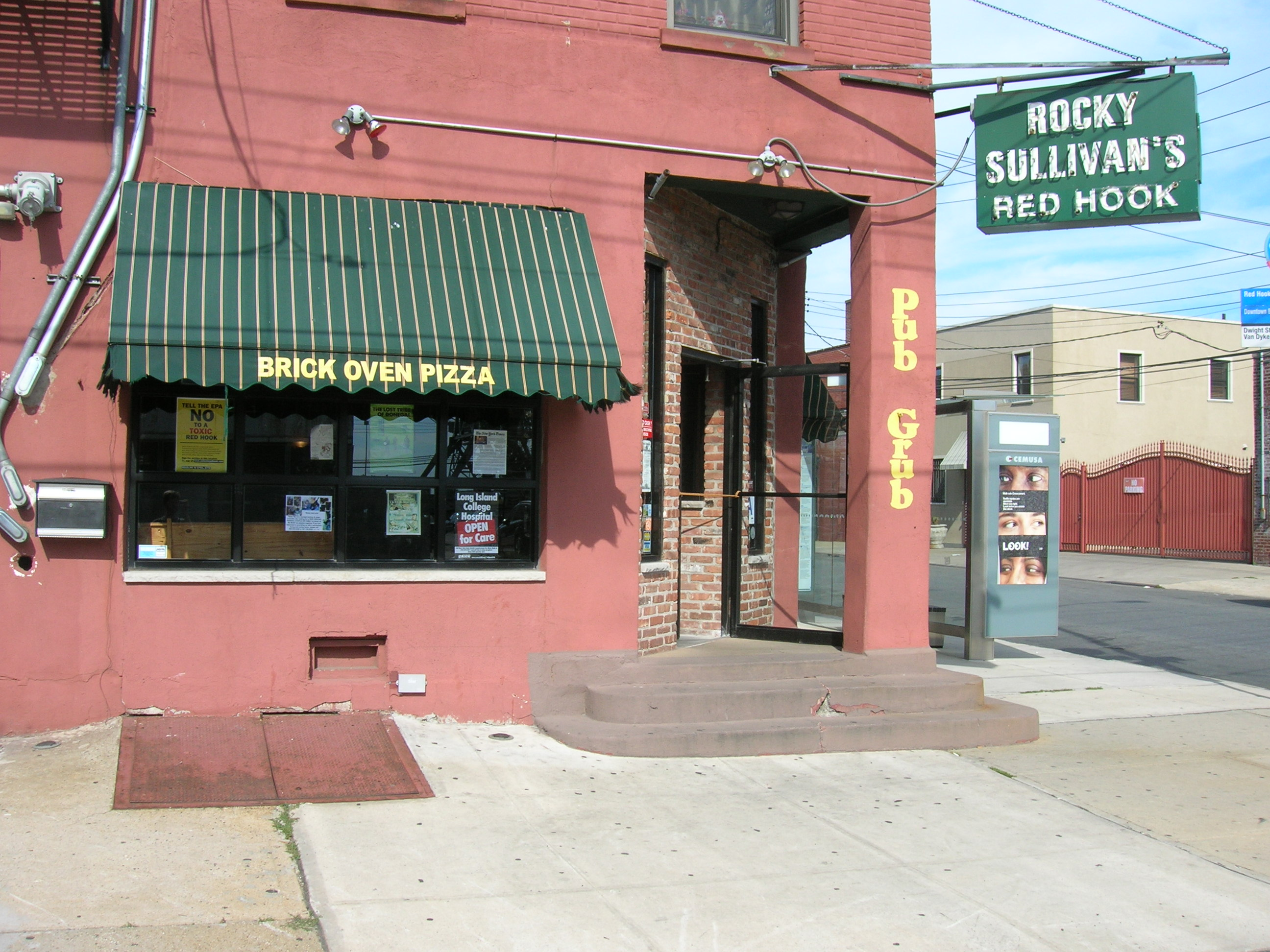
Rocky Sullivan's pub in Red Hook, seen from across Van Dyke Street

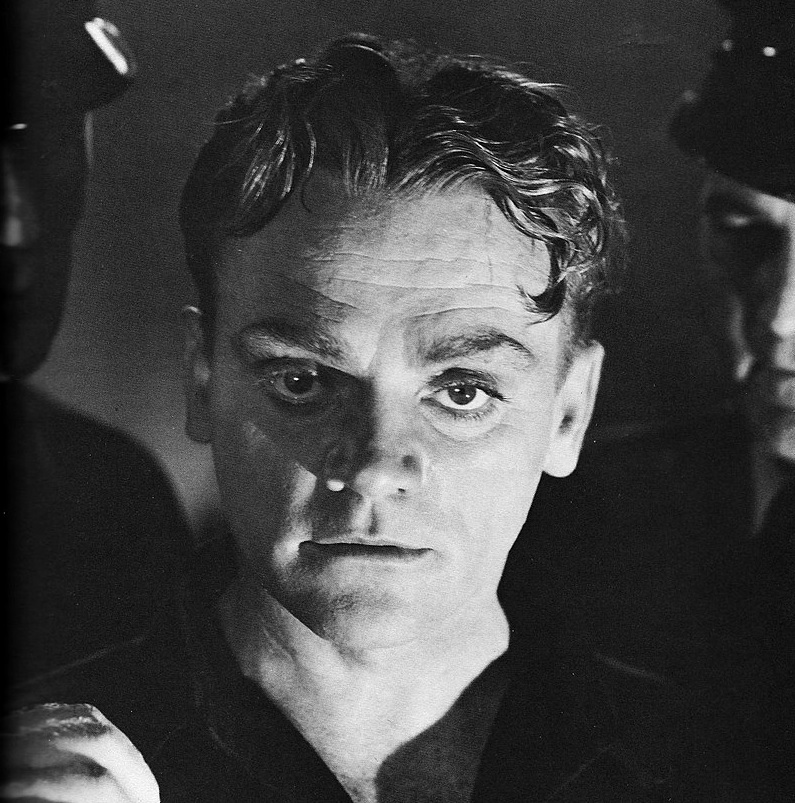
James Cagney as Rocky Sullivan in Angels with Dirty Faces (1938)

Rocky Sullivan's was a New York City Irish style pub opened in 1996 by the musician Chris Byrne (Seanchai and the Unity Squad, Black 47 and Paddy-A-Go-Go) and the journalist Patrick Farrelly (HBO's Left of the Dial, Irish Voice, Michael Moore's TV Nation). The bar was named after James Cagney's character in the 1938 movie Angels With Dirty Faces co-starring Humphrey Bogart. It was located in Red Hook, Brooklyn, on the corner of Dwight and Van Dyke Streets, from its former, original, location at East 29th Street and Lexington Avenue in Manhattan. The third incarnation of Rocky Sullivan's was located a block away at 46 Beard St. Corner of Dwight and Beard Sts, across from IKEA.

Entertainment included a pub quiz on Thursdays, Irish language classes on Tuesdays and live music on Mondays, Tuesdays, Wednesdays and Saturdays. Authors' readings, were held on the last Wednesday of the month and on other occasions, drawing enthusiastic crowds and top flight writers, including Roddy Doyle, Frank McCourt, Edna O'Brien, Pete Hamill, Rosemary Breslin, Jimmy Breslin, Mike Lupica and Brendan O'Carroll.
