= Billy Halop =

American actor (1920–1976)

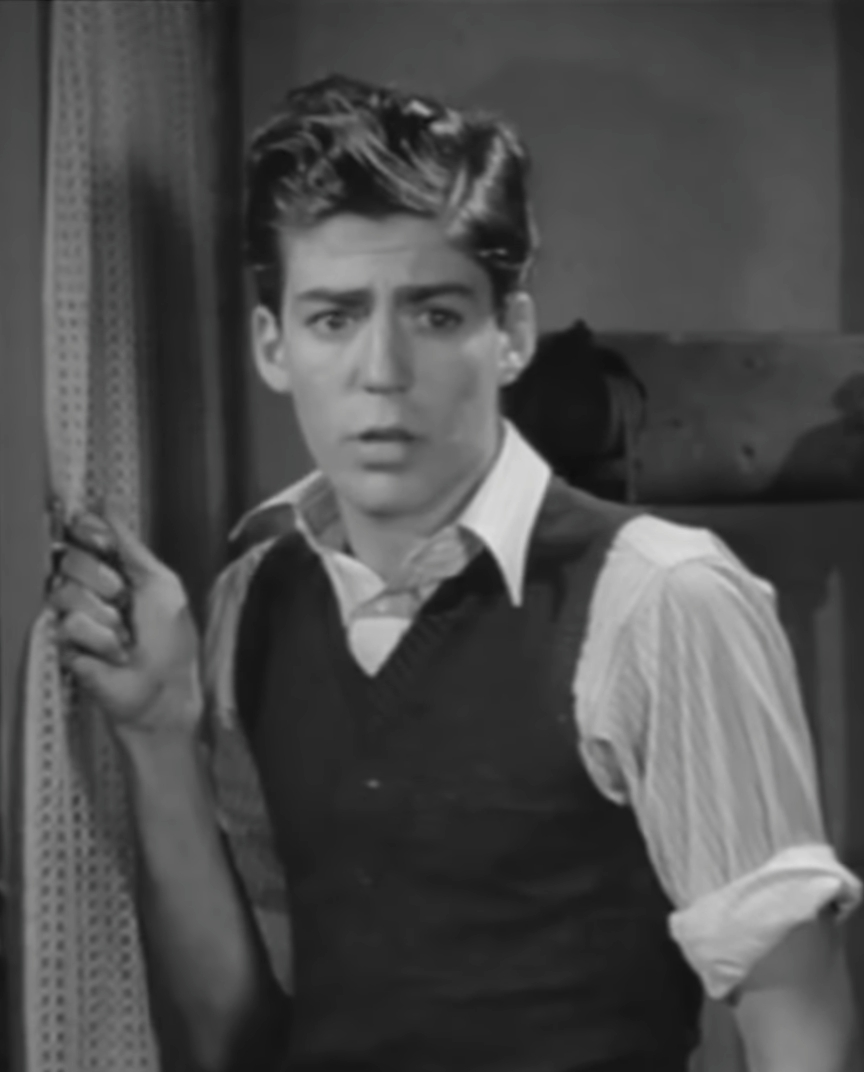
- Halop in They Made Me a Criminal (1939)
- Born: William Halop; February 11, 1920; Jamaica, Queens, New York City, U.S.
- Died: November 9, 1976 (aged 56); Brentwood, Los Angeles, California, U.S.
- Resting place: Mount Sinai Memorial Park Cemetery
- Occupations: Actor; registered nurse
- Years active: 1931–1976
- Spouses: Helen Tupper (m. 1946; div. 1947) Barbara Hoon (m. 1948; div. 1958) Suzanne Roe (m. 1960; div. 1967)

William Halop (February 11, 1920 – November 9, 1976) was an American actor.

== Early life ==
Halop was born to Benjamin Cohen Halop and Lucille Elizabeth Halop on February 11, 1920. Halop came from a theatrical family; his mother was a dancer, and his sister, Florence Halop, was an actress who worked on radio and in television. Additionally, he had a much younger brother, Joel Tucker Halop (1934-2006).

== Acting career ==
In 1933, he was given the lead as Bobby Benson in the popular new radio show The H-Bar-O Rangers. From 1934 to 1937, he starred in one of his first radio series, playing Dick Kent, the son of Fred and Lucy Kent, in "Home Sweet Home".

While studying at the Professional Children's School in New York, he was cast as Tommy Gordon in the 1935 Broadway production of Sidney Kingsley's Dead End and traveled to Hollywood with the rest of the Dead End Kids when Samuel Goldwyn produced a film version of the play in 1937. Usually called Tommy in the films, he had the recurring role of a gang leader in a series of films that featured the Dead End Kids, later billed the Little Tough Guys.

In his later years, he claimed that he was paid more than the other Dead End actors, which had contributed to bad feelings in the group, and that he was tired of the name "Dead End Kids". He played with James Cagney in Angels with Dirty Faces (1938). He played the bully Harry Flashman, speaking with an English accent, in the 1940 film Tom Brown's School Days opposite Cedric Hardwicke and Freddie Bartholomew.

After serving in World War II in the US Army Signal Corps, he found that he had grown too old to be effective in the roles that had brought him fame. At one point, he was reduced to starring in a cheap East Side Kids imitation at PRC studios, Gas House Kids (1946), at age 26. Diminishing film work, marital difficulties, and a drinking problem eventually ate away at his show business career.

In the 1970s, Halop enjoyed a career resurgence playing the character Bert Munson, cab driver and close friend and neighborhood bar owner to Archie Bunker on the television series All in the Family. He appeared in 10 episodes from 1971 to 1975, including the famed "Sammy's Visit" episode from the second season in 1972 starring Sammy Davis Jr.

== Personal life ==
Halop was married at least four times, according to interviews given near the end of his life. Helen Tupper was his first wife from 1946 until their divorce in 1947. On Valentine's Day, 1948, he married Barbara Hoon. Their marriage lasted ten years until their divorce in 1958. His third marriage in 1960 to Suzanne Roe, who had multiple sclerosis, lasted until their divorce in 1967.

The nursing skills he learned while taking care of his third wife led him to steady work as a registered nurse at St. John's Hospital in Santa Monica, California. His fourth marriage, to a nurse coworker, whose name has not been publicized, was quickly annulled after she allegedly attacked him. He later moved back in with his second wife Barbara, but they chose not to remarry.

Following two heart attacks, Halop underwent open-heart surgery in the fall of 1971.

He died of a heart attack on November 9, 1976, in Hollywood at the age of 56. He is interred at Mount Sinai Memorial Park Cemetery in Los Angeles, California.

== Filmography ==
=== Films (partial) ===
- Dead End (1937) as Tommy
- Crime School (1938) as Frankie Warren
- Little Tough Guy (1938) as Johnny Boylan
- Angels with Dirty Faces (1938) as Soapy
- They Made Me a Criminal (1939) as Tommy
- You Can't Get Away with Murder (1939) as Johnny Stone
- Hell's Kitchen (1939) as Tony
- The Angels Wash Their Faces (1939) as Billy Shafter
- Dust Be My Destiny (1939) as Hank Glenn
- On Dress Parade (1939) as Cadet Maj. Rollins
- Call a Messenger (1939) as Jimmy Hogan
- Tom Brown's School Days (1940) as Flashman
- You're Not So Tough (1940) as Tommy Abraham Lincoln
- Junior G-Men (1940, serial) as Billy Barton
- Give Us Wings (1940) as Tom
- Sky Raiders (1941, serial) as Tim Bryant
- Hit the Road (1941) as Tom
- Mob Town (1941) as Tom Barker
- Sea Raiders (1941, serial) as Billy Adams
- Blues In The Night (1941) as Peppi
- Junior G-Men of the Air (1942, Serial) as Billy 'Ace' Holden
- Tough as They Come (1942) as Tommy Clark
- Junior Army (1942) as James 'Jimmie' Fletcher
- Mug Town (1942) as Tommy Davis
- Gas House Kids (1946) as Tony Albertini
- Dangerous Years (1947) as Danny Jones
- Challenge of the Range (1949) as Reb Matson
- Too Late for Tears (1949) as Boat Attendant (uncredited)
- Air Strike (1955) as Lt. Cmdr. Orville Swanson
- Boys' Night Out (1962) as Elevator Operator (uncredited)
- The Courtship of Eddie's Father (1963) as Milkman (uncredited)
- For Love or Money (1963) as Elevator Operator
- The Wheeler Dealers (1963) as Subpoena Server (uncredited)
- A Global Affair (1964) as Cab Driver
- Mister Buddwing (1966) as Fredrick Calabrese 2nd Cab Driver
- Fitzwilly (1967) as Restaurant Owner (uncredited)

=== Television ===
Year	Series	Role	Notes
1951	The Bigelow Theatre	Unknown	Episode Crossroad
1952	Racket Squad	Salesman	Episode Accidentally on Purpose
1952	The Unexpected	Anthony 'Tony' O'Brien	Episode Born Again
1953	Boston Blackie	Johnny Evans	Episode The Heist Job
1953	The Cisco Kid	Dr. Jerome Alpers / Cass Rankin	2 episodes
1953–1954	Your Favorite Story	Randy Warren / Pidge	3 episodes
1954	Robert Montgomery Presents	Unknown	Episode The Pale Blond of Sand Street
1954	The Jack Benny Program	Call Boy / Delivery Man	2 episodes
1955	Big Town	Marty "Killer" Craig	Episode Egomaniac
1956	Steve Donovan, Western Marshal	Fred Rowe	Episode Stone River
1957	Telephone Time	Chaplain Raymond Hall	Episode Jumping Parson
1958	Playhouse 90	Fourth Counsellor	Episode Free Weekend
1959	The Thin Man	Al	Episode The Perfect Servant
1959	Colonel Humphrey Flack	Ambros	Episode West of the Weirdos
1959	Richard Diamond, Private Detective	Charlie Cole	Episode Two for Paradise
1959	Highway Patrol	Steve Dorn	Episode Desperate Men
1960	Wanted: Dead or Alive	Cashier	Episode Mental Lapse
1961	77 Sunset Strip	Tim Acton	Episode The Space Caper
1961	87th Precinct	Richard Samuelson	Episode Lady Killer
1961	Outlaws	Grady	Episode The Verdict
1962	Wagon Train	Mr. Brewster	Episode The Jeff Hartfield Story
1962	The New Breed	Unknown	Episode Walk this Street Lightly
1962–1964	Perry Mason	Barman / Man / Corbett	3 episodes
1963	I'm Dickens, He's Fenster	Attendant	Episode Mr. Takeover
1963	The Courtship of Eddie's Father	Milkman	
1963	Going My Way	Mr. Thompson	Episode A Tough Act to Follow
1963	Glynis	Riley	Episode "Ten Cents a Dance"
1963	The Fugitive	Mike	Episode Terror at High Point
1963, 1965	The Andy Griffith Show	Tiny / Charlie	2 episodes
1963	The Fugitive	Mike	Episode Terror At High Point
1963–1964	The Adventures of Ozzie and Harriet	Drive-in ticket clerk / Newspaper Man / Pool Hall Manager	3 episodes
1964	Vacation Playhouse	Soldier #2	Episode Papa G.I.
1965	The F.B.I.	Manager	Episode To Free My Enemy
1965, 1968	Gomer Pyle: USMC	Attendant / Hawkins	2 episodes
1966–1967	Gunsmoke	Bartender / Barney	3 episodes
1969	Adam-12	Judge George Perkins	Episode Log 123: Courtroom
1969	Land of the Giants	Bartender Harry	Episode Our Man O'Reilly
1970	Julia	Security Guard	Episode Ready, Aim, Fired
1970	Bracken's World	Pat, the projectionist	2 episodes
1971–1976	All in the Family	Bert Munson	10 episodes
1971	O'Hara, U.S. Treasury	Bart	Episode Operation: Bandera
1974	The Phantom of Hollywood	Studio Engineer	TV film
