= Dead End Kids =

Group of young actors who appeared in Sidney Kingsley's Broadway play Dead End in 1935

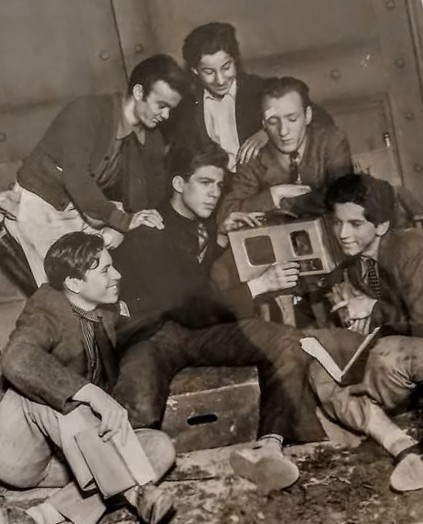
Dead End Kids

The Dead End Kids were a group of young actors from New York City who appeared in Sidney Kingsley's Broadway play Dead End in 1935. In 1937, producer Samuel Goldwyn brought all of them to Hollywood and turned the play into a film. They proved to be so popular that they continued to make movies under various monikers, including the Little Tough Guys, the East Side Kids, and the Bowery Boys, until 1958.

== History (1934–1939) ==
In 1934, Sidney Kingsley wrote a play about a group of children growing up on the streets of New York City. Fourteen children were hired to play various roles in the play, including Billy Halop (Tommy), Bobby Jordan (Angel), Huntz Hall (Dippy), Charles Duncan (Spit), Bernard Punsly (Milty), Gabriel Dell (T.B.), and Leo and David Gorcey (Second Avenue Boys). Duncan left for a role in another play before opening night, and was replaced by Leo, his understudy. Leo had been a plumber's assistant and was originally recruited by his brother David to audition for the play.

The play opened at the Belasco Theatre on October 28, 1935, and ran for two years, totaling 684 performances. Samuel Goldwyn and director William Wyler saw the play and decided to turn it into a film. They paid $165,000 for the rights to the film and began auditioning actors in Los Angeles. Failing to find actors who could convey the emotions they saw in the play, Goldwyn and Wyler had six of the original Kids (Halop, Jordan, Hall, Punsly, Dell, and Leo Gorcey) brought from New York City to Hollywood for the film. The Kids were all signed to two-year contracts, allowing for possible future films, and began working on the 1937 United Artists' film, Dead End. The actual name of the gang of boys in Dead End is written in chalk on the wall shown throughout the movie. It reads: "East 53rd Place Gang Members Only". During production, the boys ran wild around the studio, destroying property, including a truck that they crashed into a sound stage. Goldwyn chose not to use them again and sold their contract to Warner Bros.

Warner Bros. had initially attempted to rename them the "Crime School Kids" through advertisements for their first two films produced there, starting with Crime School (1937), to disassociate them from their previous studio's film, and promote their own. In 1938, they made their only color appearance in a short film, Swingtime in the Movies, and were referred to as that name. This was all in vain, though, as the name never caught on, and they remained the Dead End Kids.

At Warner Bros., the Dead End Kids made six films, including Angels with Dirty Faces, with some of the top actors in Hollywood, including James Cagney, Humphrey Bogart, John Garfield, Pat O'Brien, and Ronald Reagan. The last one was in 1939, when they were released from their contracts owing to more antics on the studio lot.

=== Filmography ===
Year	Title	Distributor	Notes
1937	Dead End	United Artists	
1938	Crime School	Warner Brothers	
1938	Angels with Dirty Faces	Warner Brothers	
1938	Swingtime in the Movies	Vitaphone/Warner Brothers	Short / Uncredited
1939	They Made Me a Criminal	Warner Brothers	
1939	Hell's Kitchen	Warner Brothers	
1939	The Angels Wash Their Faces	Warner Brothers	
1939	On Dress Parade	Warner Brothers	

== Little Tough Guys (1938–1943) ==
In 1938, Universal Pictures made an imitation Dead End Kids drama, Little Tough Guy. Leo Gorcey and Bobby Jordan remained under contract to Warners, so Universal hired the remaining four Dead End Kids. The film proved successful enough for Universal to launch a "Little Tough Guys" series in 1939, but by this time the original gang members were not available, so Universal filled the roles with other Hollywood juveniles (including future series perennials David Gorcey and Billy Benedict). Eventually all of the original Dead End Kids except Leo Gorcey joined the Universal series, which became known as "The Dead End Kids and the Little Tough Guys." The final Universal film was Keep 'Em Slugging (1943) with Bobby Jordan in the leading role.

== The East Side Kids (1940–1945) ==
Producer Sam Katzman, releasing through Monogram Pictures, began his own tough-kid series, beginning with the 1940 film East Side Kids. As was the case at Universal, none of the original Dead End Kids was available, so Katzman hired six juveniles to fill the roles. For the second film, Katzman engaged Bobby Jordan and Leo Gorcey, along with David Gorcey and Our Gang alumni "Sunshine" Sammy Morrison and Donald Haines. In 1941 Huntz Hall and Gabriel Dell joined the series, now known as "The East Side Kids", followed in 1943 by Billy Benedict.

A total of 22 East Side Kids films were made, ending with Come Out Fighting in 1945.

== The Bowery Boys (1946–1958) ==
In 1946, Bobby Jordan, Huntz Hall, and Leo Gorcey, working with Jordan's agent Jan Grippo, revamped The East Side Kids, renaming them "The Bowery Boys". These films followed a more established formula, with each member playing the same character steadily. During the series's freshman year, the gang was Leo Gorcey, Huntz Hall, Bobby Jordan, Gabriel Dell, Billy Benedict, and David Gorcey. Jordan left the series in 1947, followed by Dell in 1950, Benedict in 1951, and Leo Gorcey in 1956. Only Huntz Hall and David Gorcey remained from the original gang, with Stanley Clements stepping into the role of Hall's sidekick. In all, 48 Bowery Boys films were made, ending with 1958's In the Money. During the series Hall and Dell did a nightclub act together. Gorcey and Hall reteamed on the film Second Fiddle to a Steel Guitar then finally, in The Phynx.

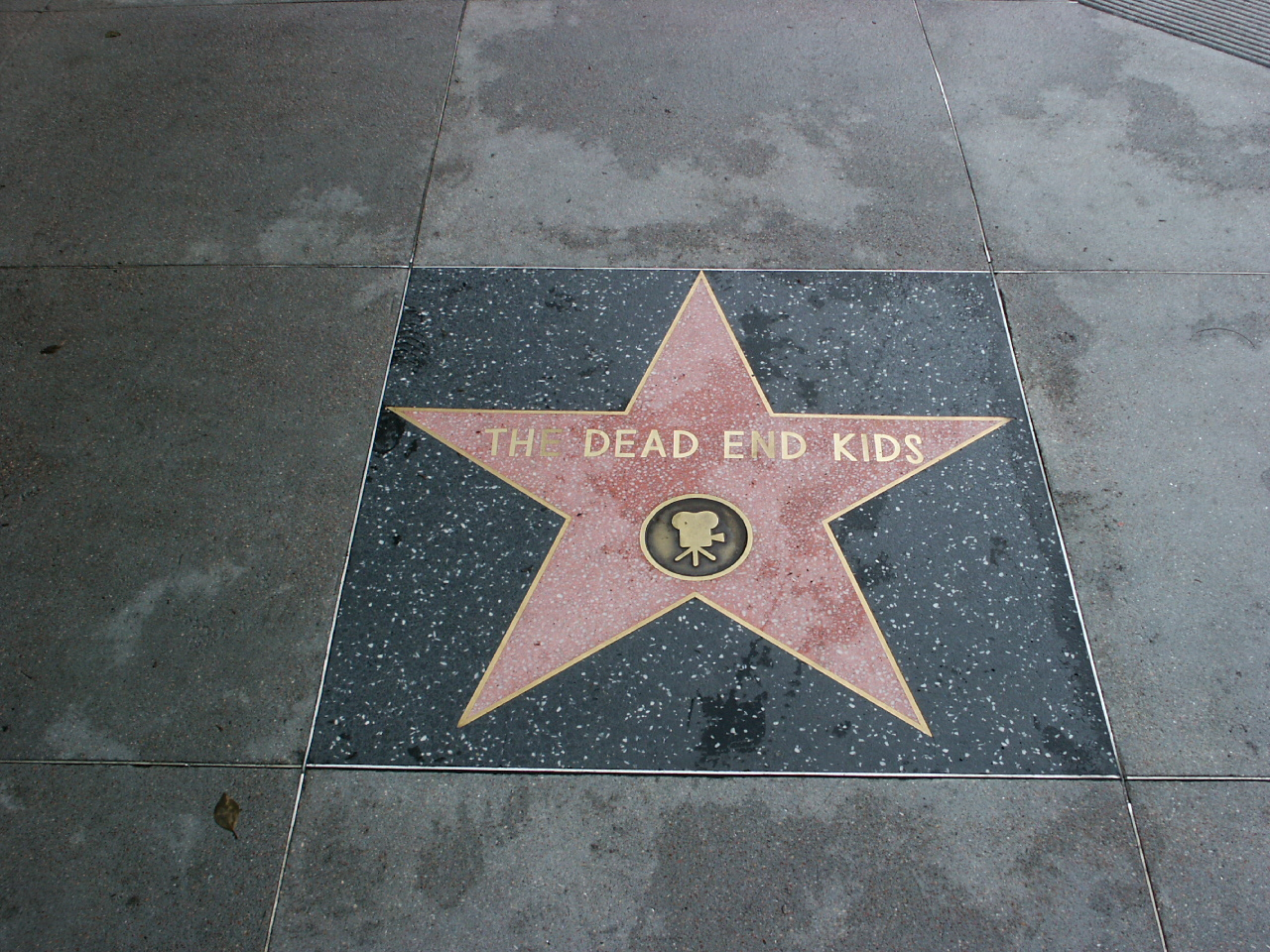
The Dead End Kids' star on the Hollywood Walk of Fame

== Epilogue ==
The various teams that began life as "The Dead End Kids" made 89 films and three serials for four different studios during their 21-year-long film career. The team was awarded a star on Hollywood's Walk of Fame that can be found at the corner of La Brea and Hollywood.

One notable aspect of the group's history is their transition from stark drama to comedy. When they began, in Dead End and their other early films, their characters were serious, gritty, genuinely menacing young hoodlums. But, by the height of their career, their movies were comedies, with the Kids depicted as low-class but basically harmless, likable teens – comic caricatures of their former selves.

The original play has had two revivals. A 1978 adaptation played at the Quigh Theatre in New York, N.Y. and another in 2005 at the Ahmanson Theatre in Los Angeles. In 2022, a musical adaptation of the play, entitled "Dead End the Musical," was produced as a concept album available for digital download. The adaptation was written by Neil Fishman (music), Harvey Edelman (lyrics), and Peter C. Palame (book) and published by Sammy Smile Music LLC.

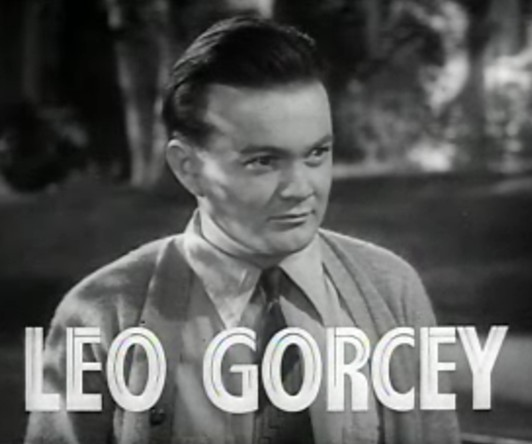
Gorcey in the film Gallant Sons (1940)

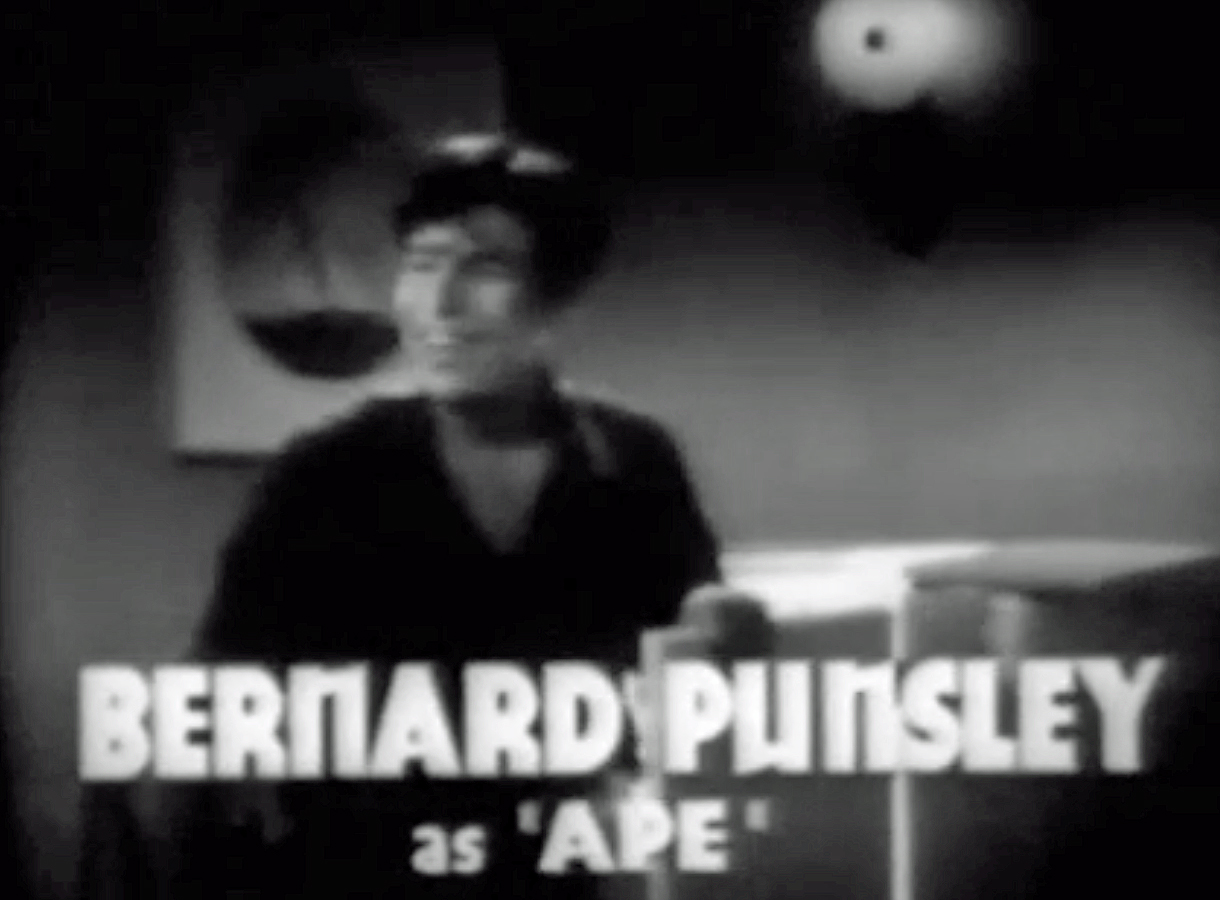
Bernard Punsly in the trailer for Little Tough Guy (1938)

== Members ==
- Billy Halop served as the original leader of the "Dead End Kids". Also appeared in the 'Dead End Kids and Little Tough Guys" films of Universal.
- Leo Gorcey was the only original Dead End Kid to only appear in the Dead End Kids films, East Side Kids and Bowery Boys. He was known for his diminutive stature, wise guy attitude, and frequent malapropisms, which he delivered in a Brooklyn accent. While he played various characters in the "Dead End Kids", "East Side Kids", and "Bowery Boys" films, these roles tended to be similar street tough characters. For the East Side Kids, he almost always was the leader of the gang, aside from the last film that starred Bobby Jordan as the leader without Leo. In the "Bowery Boys" series, he was the leader of the group, aside from the last seven films in which he didn't appear after his father died, who played Louie the shop owner in the series.
- Huntz Hall appeared in all incarnations in the series of films, Dead End Kids, Dead End Kids and Little Tough Guys, East Side Kids and Bowery Boys. In the Bowery Boys, he became known for his goofy, bumbling character Horace DeBussy "Sach" Jones. Following Gorcey's departure, he became the focal point of the series. Later, Hall staged a successful nightclub act with fellow actor Gabriel Dell.
- Bobby Jordan was the youngest member of the group. He appeared in all incarnations of the group. Over time, with the rising popularity of Gorcey and Hall, Jordan's role was reduced to little more than a background character.
- Gabriel Dell appeared in all incarnations of the gang. He was often cast in character roles apart from the gang members in the Eastside kids series. Dell continued to act in both film and television roles for the rest of his life.
- Bernard Punsly (also spelled Punsley), like Billy Halop, only appeared in the Dead End Kids and Dead End Kids and Little Tough Guys series. He was known for his well-meaning, likable personality. He tended to play "new kid on the block" type roles and act as a voice of reason among the gang. After serving in the military, Punsley became a doctor and retired from show business altogether. He was the last surviving member of the Dead End Kids.

== Similar groups ==
- The Harlem Tuff Kids
  - Reform School (1939)
  - Take My Life (1942)
- The Gas House Kids
  - Gas House Kids (1946) with Billy Halop
  - Gas House Kids Go West (1947) with Our Gang alumni Carl "Alfalfa" Switzer and Tommy Bond
  - Gas House Kids in Hollywood (1947) with Switzer and Bond

Preceded by Broadway play 1935–1937	Dead End Kids; 1937–1939	Succeeded by Little Tough Guys; 1938–1943
