= Elspeth Dudgeon =

Scottish character actress (1871–1955)

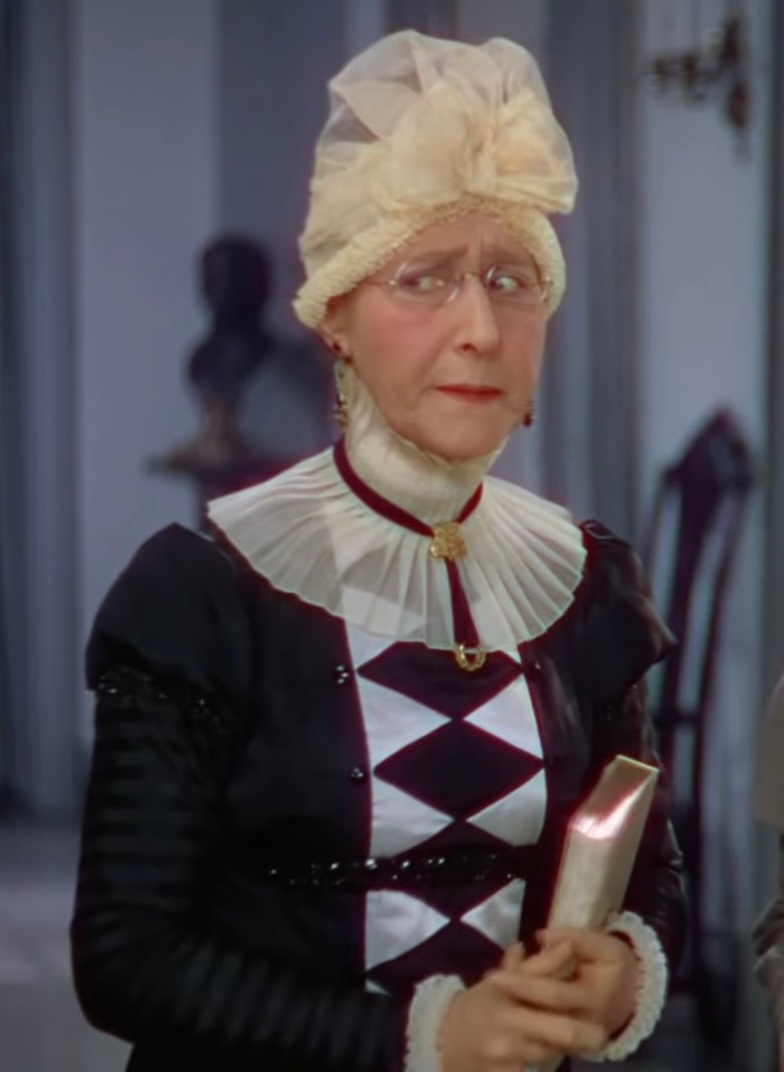
- Dudgeon in Becky Sharp (1935)
- Born: 4 December 1871; Edinburgh, Scotland
- Died: 11 December 1955 (aged 84); Los Angeles, California, U.S.
- Resting place: Valhalla Memorial Park Cemetery
- Other name: John Dudgeon
- Occupation: Actress
- Years active: 1916–1955

Elspeth Dudgeon (4 December 1871 – 11 December 1955) was a Scottish character actress. She was involved in 67 films, only 14 of which included her name in the credits.

Her best known appearances includes The Old Dark House (1932), Becky Sharp (1935), and Sh! The Octopus (1937). She also acted in Bride of Frankenstein (1935), The Last Outpost (1935), Show Boat (1936), The Prince and the Pauper (1937), Sh! The Octopus (1937), The Story of Vernon & Irene Castle (1939), Bulldog Drummond's Secret Police (1939), Calling Dr. Kildare (1939), Pride and Prejudice (1940), Foreign Correspondent (1940), Now, Voyager (1942), The Canterville Ghost (1944), and The Secret Garden (1949).

== Early life ==
Dudgeon was born on 4 December 1871 in Edinburgh, Scotland and developed an interest in theatrics as a young girl. After joining a well known amateur organisation, she became notable for character roles.

== Career ==
Her first break came while she was still in Scotland, when actor-manager Osmond Tearle heard of her ability and booked her to appear in various Shakesperian plays. Before this, she was already well known around Glasgow, such as in her part of a housekeeper in the 1916 play Doorsteps, where her performance was described as "extremely artistic".

During World War I, Dudgeon was part of Lena Ashwell's company, performing for soldiers near the English front, occasionally joined by male soldiers on leave. She also worked for Lydia Yvorska's company. Following her emigration to America, she joined Mr Clive's company as the Copyley Theatre. She first appeared in an uncredited part in Waterloo Bridge (1931), before which she had a long and not very successful career as a theatrical actress.

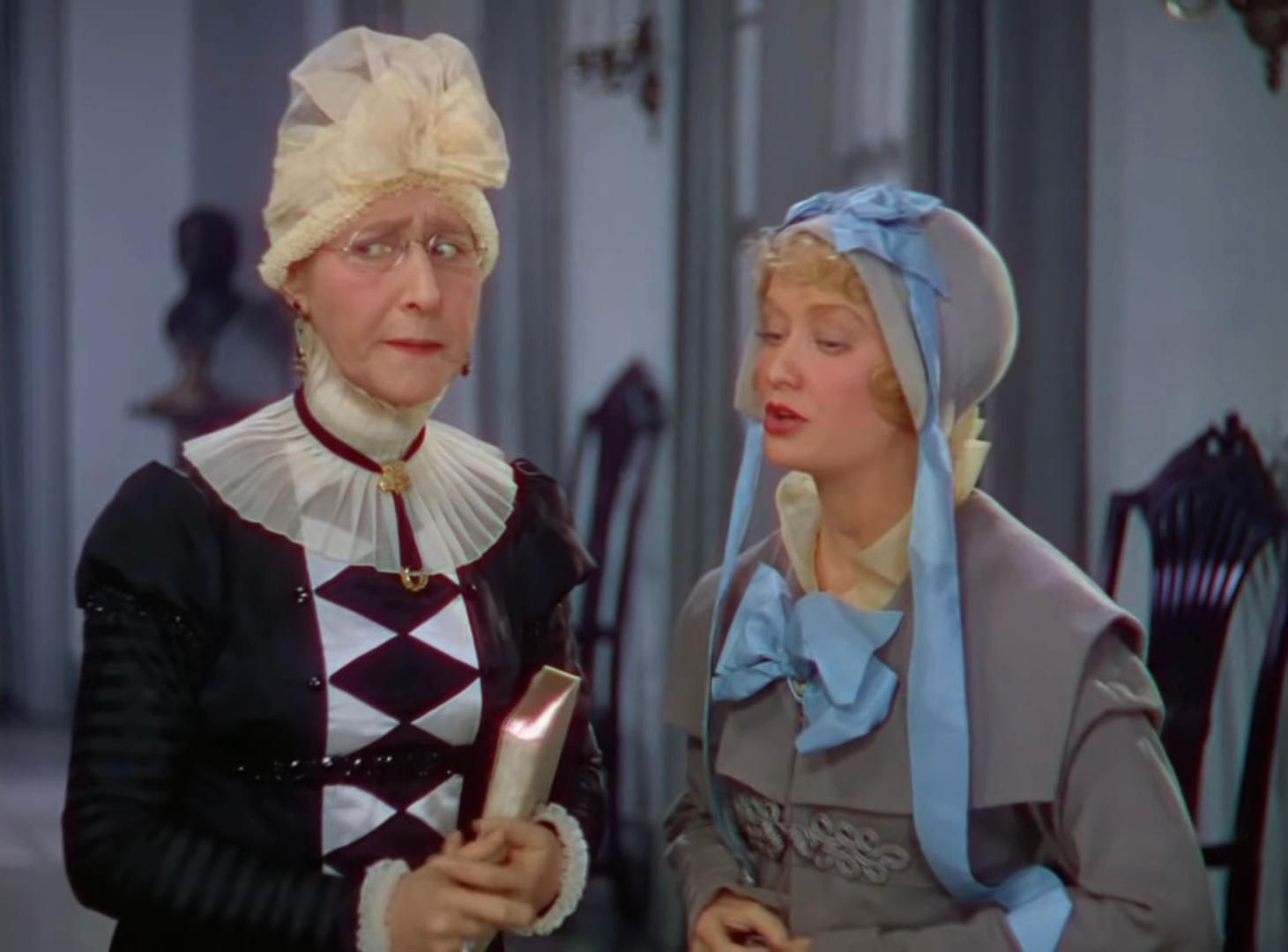
Elspeth Dudgeon and Miriam Hopkins in Becky Sharp (1935)

One of her earlier best remembered appearances was in the role of Sir Roderick Femm in the 1932 film The Old Dark House. Director James Whale needed someone to portray a centenarian and Dudgeon was the oldest actress he knew of, despite her being just 60 at the time. A beard was pasted onto her and she delivered her lines in her own, high voice. Having played the part of a man, she was credited as John Dudgeon, with actress Gloria Stuart later commenting that none of the cast at the time were aware Dudgeon was actually a female actress until the cast party. Whale was reported to have enjoyed keeping her real gender a secret, although Dudgeon would later work for him again several years later under her own name and gender. She was also known as playing Miss Pinkerton in Becky Sharp (1935). She featured in some other hit films of the following years, such as Camille (1936), Pride and Prejudice (1940) and a supporting role alongside Charles Laughton in The Canterville Ghost (1944). She is also remembered by horror film buffs for her startling transformation scene in the cult comedy-thriller Sh! The Octopus (1937).

== Personal life ==
She lived in California for 23 years. She was 5 feet 7 inches (1.70 m).

== Death ==
She died on 11 December 1955, one week after her 84th birthday, in Los Angeles, California. Her remains were cremated at Chapel Of The Pines Crematory before she was buried at Valhalla Memorial Park Cemetery.

== Filmography ==
Year	Title	Role	Notes
1931	Waterloo Bridge	Elegante Dowager	(uncredited)
1932	The Man Who Played God	Would-be Ticket Buyer	(uncredited)
1932	The Impatient Maiden	Neighbor	(uncredited)
1932	Vanity Fair	Sir Pitt's Housekeeper	
1932	A Successful Calamity	Musicale Guest	(uncredited)
1932	The Crash	Solitarie Player	(uncredited)
1932	The Old Dark House	Sir Roderick Femm	(credited as John Dudgeon)
1932	Cynara	Mrs. Weeks	(uncredited)
1933	Zoo in Budapest	Woman Whose Skunk Was Stolen	(uncredited)
1933	Looking Forward	Old Servant	(uncredited)
1933	Stage Mother	Music Store Customer	(uncredited)
1934	Stand Up and Cheer!	Reformer	(uncredited)
1934	The Moonstone	Betteredge, Housekeeper	
1935	The Night Is Young	Duchess of Reidheim	(uncredited)
1935	Vanessa: Her Love Story	Vera Trent	
1935	Becky Sharp	Miss Pinkerton	
1935	Bride of Frankenstein	Gypsy mother	(uncredited)
1935	The Girl Friend	English Lady	(uncredited)
1935	The Last Outpost	Head Nurse	(uncredited)
1935	I Found Stella Parish	Second Waiting Woman	(uncredited)
1935	Kind Lady	Lady Emily	(uncredited)
1935	Sylvia Scarlett	Older Woman	(uncredited)
1936	Show Boat	Mother Superior	(uncredited)
1936	Counterfeit	Mrs. Martin	(uncredited)
1936	The White Angel	Second Lady Disapproving of Florence	(uncredited)
1936	Give Me Your Heart	Alice Dodd	
1936	A Woman Rebels	Lord Gaythorne's Maid	(uncredited)
1936	Camille	Fireplace Attendant	(uncredited)
1937	The Prince and the Pauper	John Canty's Mother	
1937	The Great Garrick	Old Witch in Audience	(uncredited)
1937	Sh! The Octopus	Nanny	
1938	Fools for Scandal	Cynthia	(uncredited)
1938	Mystery House	Aunt Lucy Kingery	
1938	The Crowd Roars	Old Witch in Audience	(uncredited)
1939	Midnight	Stephanie's Party Guest with Dog	(uncredited)
1939	Raffles	School Mistress	(uncredited)
1939	The Story of Vernon & Irene Castle	Lady Bolton	(uncredited)
1939	Bulldog Drummond's Secret Police	Mrs. Thomas, Housekeeper	(uncredited)
1939	Calling Dr. Kildare	Old Lady in Hall	(uncredited)
1940	Pride and Prejudice	Mrs King	(uncredited)
1942	Now, Voyager	Aunt Hester	(uncredited)
1942	Nightmare	Angus' Wife	
1943	Family Troubles	Aunt Aurelia	
1943	Footlight Glamour	Frances	(uncredited)
1944	The Heavenly Body	Lady Behind Vicky at Concert	(uncredited)
1944	Bathing Beauty	Miss Travers	(uncredited)
1944	The Canterville Ghost	Aged Woman at Party	(uncredited)
1944	Abroad with Two Yanks	Stuart's Party Guest	(uncredited)
1944	Reckless Age	Miss Ferris	(uncredited)
1944	Three Sisters of the Moors	Townswoman	(uncredited)
1944	The Suspect	Pauline Barlow	(uncredited)
1945	The Woman Who Came Back	Old Woman in Bus / Jezebel Trister	(uncredited)
1946	Song of Arizona	Ella	(uncredited)
1946	Devotion	Elderly Reader of 'Jane Eyre'	(uncredited)
1946	Till the Clouds Roll By	Katie	(uncredited)
1947	Yankee Fakir	Scrubwoman	
1947	Time Out of Mind	Guest	(uncredited)
1947	Monsieur Verdoux	Old Woman	(uncredited)
1947	Bulldog Drummond Strikes Back	Nanny	
1947	The Paradine Case	Second Matron	(uncredited)
1947	If Winter Comes	Mrs. Ward	(uncredited)
1948	B.F.'s Daughter	Mrs. Marbey	(uncredited)
1948	Julia Misbehaves	Woman in Pawn Shop	(uncredited)
1949	The Secret Garden	Dickon's Mother	(uncredited)
1949	Lust for Gold	Martha Bannister	(uncredited)
1949	The Great Sinner	Fearful Old Gambling Woman	(uncredited)
1952	Anything Can Happen	Grandma	(uncredited)
1955	Moonfleet	Granny Walker - Old Woman in Church	(uncredited)
