= Terrance Mahoney =

Terrance Mahoney may refer to:

- Terrance Mahoney, character in Smuggler's Cove
- Terrance Mahoney, character in Angels in Disguise (film)
