= Bowery Buckaroos =

1947 film by William Beaudine

- Directed by: William Beaudine
- Written by: Edmond Seward; Tim Ryan; Jerry Warner
- Produced by: Jan Grippo
- Starring: Leo Gorcey; Huntz Hall; Bobby Jordan; William Benedict; Gabriel Dell
- Cinematography: Marcel Le Picard
- Edited by: William Austin
- Music by: Edward J. Kay
- Production company: Monogram Pictures
- Distributed by: Monogram Pictures
- Release date: November 22, 1947 (U.S.)
- Running time: 66 minutes
- Country: United States
- Language: English

Bowery Buckaroos is a 1947 American comedy film directed by William Beaudine and starring The Bowery Boys. It is the eighth film in the series and the last Bowery Boys film that Bobby Jordan appeared in.

== Plot ==
Louie is singing the song "Louie the Lout" about his days in the old west to the boys in the Sweet Shop. All of a sudden a man arrives on horseback and Louie hides from him in the back of the store. The man identifies himself as a sheriff of Hangman's Hollow, a town out west where Louie is wanted for a murder that took place 20 years before. The boys tell the sheriff they never heard of Louie and he leaves. Louie comes out of hiding and tells them the story of when he was a younger man and lived in Hangman's Hollow he and his partner, Pete Briggs, discovered gold. He then tells them that Pete was murdered by Blackjack McCoy and he was framed for the murder and fled to the city. He then shows them a map of where the gold is hidden...tattooed on his back.

The boys decide to go out west to clear Louie's name and help him give Pete's share to his daughter. They make a copy of the map on Sach's back and head west. They are ambushed by some Indians and Sach unwittingly shows the map to one of them. Indian Joe then heads back to town and alerts Blackjack that the boys are in town to clear Louie's name and claim the gold. Meanwhile, Gabe, who Slip sent ahead, has gotten into Blackjack's good graces with his card tricks and assists Slip and the boys.

Eventually, the boys capture Blackjack and have him confess the murder to the sheriff, and just as everyone is about to collect the gold and live happily ever after, Slip hits Sach on the head waking him up. We learn that it was all Sach's dream.

== Cast ==
=== The Bowery Boys ===
- Leo Gorcey as Terrance Aloysius 'Slip' Mahoney
- Huntz Hall as Horace Debussy 'Sach' Jones
- Bobby Jordan as Bobby
- Gabriel Dell as Gabe
- William Benedict as Whitey
- David Gorcey as Chuck

=== Supporting cast ===
- Bernard Gorcey as Louie Dumbrowski
- Julie Gibson as Katherine Briggs
- Jack Norman as Blackjack McCoy
- Iron Eyes Cody as Indian Joe
- Minerva Urecal as Kate Barlow
- Russell Simpson as Luke Barlow
- Chief Yowlachie as Chief Hi-Octane
- Rosa Turich as Ramona

== Production ==
This was the last Bowery Boys movie for Bobby Jordan. He had formerly been billed alongside Gorcey and Hall as the stars of the East Side Kids, but now he was a member of the ensemble. Growing tired of having to take a back seat to co-stars Leo Gorcey and Huntz Hall, he decided to quit the series.

According to Julie Gibson, early in the production Leo Gorcey wanted to take a humorous line of dialogue scripted for Gibson. Not knowing that Gorcey was essentially the executive producer of the series, she flatly refused and Gorcey backed off. Gibson later found out that this was a common practice by Gorcey toward his fellow Bowery Boys.

== Reception ==
Trade publisher Pete Harrison wrote, "Best described as a burlesqued western, this latest of the Bowery Boys comedies shapes up as one of the better pictures of the series. The story is of course nonsensical, but the pace is lively and it has some genuinely funny situations." Fred Hift of Motion Picture Herald reported, "This picture does not deviate much from the line followed by its predecessors except that it transfers the Bowery Boys out west, and that it has a surprise ending which should please laugh-hungry audiences. Story-wise, the picture makes no pretense at logic, but merely serves to show off the Bowery Boys at their East Side best. Seen at the New Yorker theatre in New York. The audience seemed to like it."

Exhibitors did like it: "This series, for a small town like my situation, can't be beat and this one is above par. Will please -- best crowds I had in weeks." (Terry Axley of England, Arkansas). "Our patrons seem to get a kick out of this gang, so we use them occasionally. It doesn't seem to make much difference what they are laughing at, just so there is some funny stuff. This one has it." (Mayme P. Musselman of Lincoln, Kansas). "Doubled with Gas House Kids Go West. We tried these on a comparison basis and the Bowery Boys have the better following, although the others are fair. Played to capacity matinée and fair business at night, so no kick." (D. W. Trisko of Jerome, Arizona).

== Home media ==
Released on VHS by Warner Brothers on September 1, 1998.

Warner Archives released the film on made-to-order DVD in the United States as part of "The Bowery Boys, Volume Two" on April 9, 2013.

Preceded by News Hounds; 1947	'The Bowery Boys' movies 1946-1958	Succeeded by Angels' Alley; 1948
