= Ever Since Eve (1937 film) =

1937 film

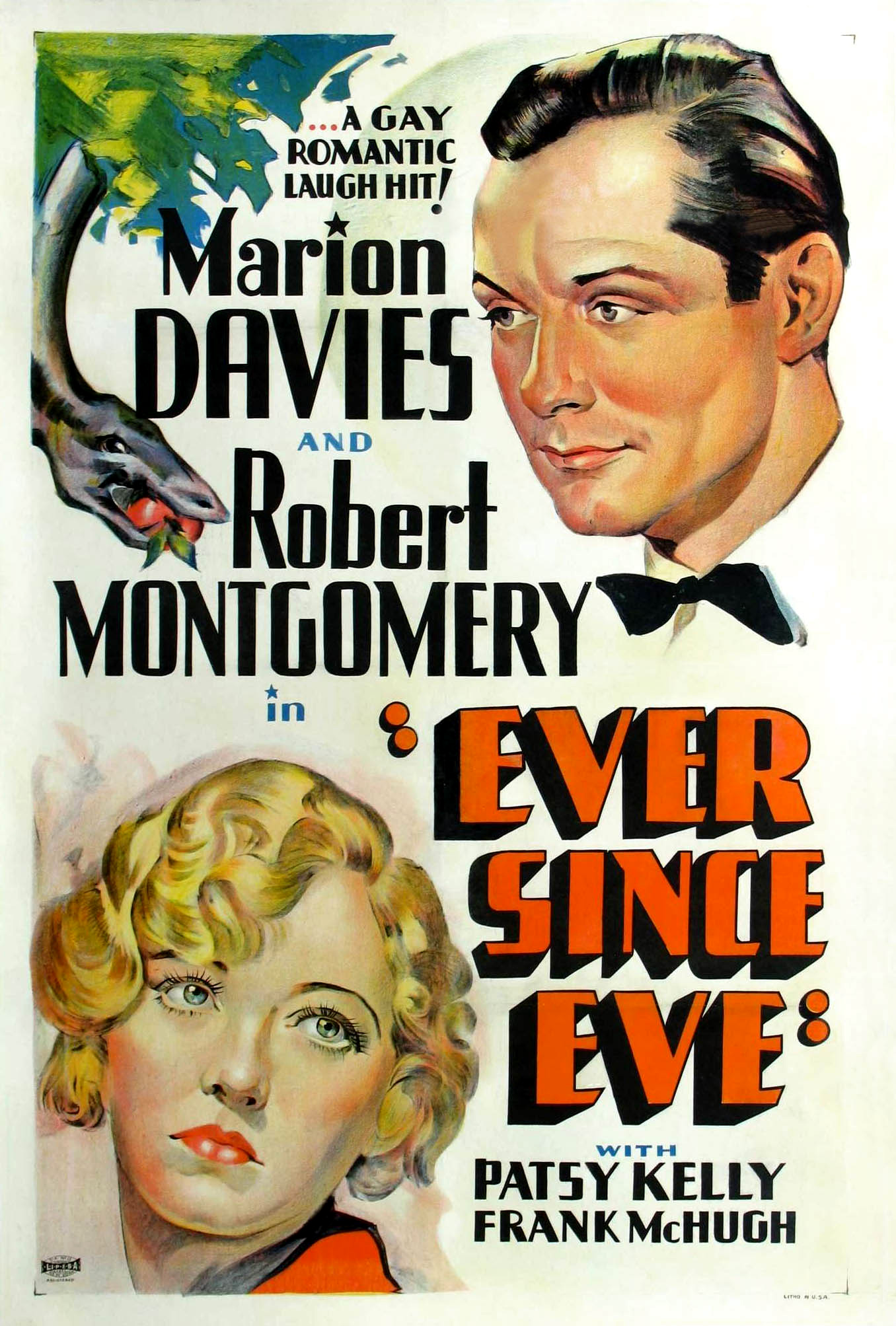
- Directed by: Lloyd Bacon
- Written by: Gene Baker (story); Margaret Lee (story); Earl Baldwin; Lillie Hayward; Lawrence Riley; Brown Holmes (uncredited dialogue)
- Produced by: Earl Baldwin (uncredited)
- Starring: Marion Davies; Robert Montgomery; Frank McHugh, Patsy Kelly
- Cinematography: George Barnes
- Edited by: William Holmes
- Music by: Heinz Roemheld
- Production company: Cosmopolitan Productions
- Distributed by: Warner Bros. Pictures
- Release date: July 15, 1937
- Running time: 80 minutes
- Country: United States
- Language: English

Ever Since Eve is a 1937 American romantic comedy film directed by Lloyd Bacon and starring Marion Davies, in her final film, Robert Montgomery, Frank McHugh and Patsy Kelly.

== Plot ==
Marge Winton is fed up with having to quit job after job to avoid the advances of lecherous bosses. When she goes to the employment agency, she is surprised to discover that she is too beautiful for one position. So she gives herself a makeover, hiding her blond curls under a dark, severe wig, putting on glasses, and wearing a drab, unflattering dress.

The disguise works. Book publisher Abigail Belldon hires her as a secretary for lazy writer Freddy Matthews. Freddy would rather go out and party with his girlfriend Camille Lansing than start on his novel. Abigail has already sold the film rights, and the deadline for delivering the book to the film studio is fast approaching. She figures a plain secretary will be one less distraction.

Despite his initial displeasure at Marge's appearance, Freddy gives in and accepts her. However, Camille keeps taking up too much of Freddy's time and attention, and Marge begins to fall for him as well. Thus, Marge has plenty of reason to try to sabotage their relationship. When this is discovered, she quits.

A complication arises when Freddy decides to rehire her. He shows up at her apartment unexpectedly and sees her without her disguise, so she has to pretend to be her roommate Sadie. They spend the entire evening and part of the morning getting acquainted.

With the deadline only days away, however, Marge pretends to go out of town for a couple of weeks. The plan backfires. Instead of writing, Freddie goes after her. Camille finds out and follows as well. Marge has no choice but to show up at the hotel, registering first as the plain secretary, then as Sadie, juggling her two personas to keep Freddie in the dark. She finally gets an outline from him for the last few chapters, which she uses to finish the novel on her own.

Since he gave the outline to "Sadie", and she had no opportunity to give it to Marge, Freddie finally realizes that they are one and the same. He decides to marry her anyway.

== Cast ==
- Marion Davies as Marjorie "Marge" Winton, a secretary, also known as "Sadie Day"
- Robert Montgomery as Freddie Matthews, an author
- Frank McHugh as Mike McGillicuddy, a writer of girls' books under the pen name "Mabel DeCraven"
- Patsy Kelly as Sadie Day, Marjorie's roommate, also known as "Suzie Wilson"
- Allen Jenkins as Jake Edgall, Sadie's plumber boyfriend
- Louise Fazenda as Abigail Belldon, Freddie's publisher
- Barton MacLane as Al McCoy, Jake's boss
- Marcia Ralston as Camille Lansing, Freddie's girlfriend
- Fredric Clark as Alonzo, Freddie's butler
- Arthur Hoyt as hotel manager
- Mary Treen as employment clerk
- Harry Hayden as President of the Purity League
- Pierre Watkin as Barton
- John T. Murray as Lowell
- William B. Davidson as Henderson
- Florence Gill as Annie, the cleaning lady (uncredited)
- Bess Flowers as dance extra (uncredited)

== Reception ==
Frank Nugent criticized the film in his New York Times review, writing:

Pieced together out of threadbare scraps of farce, basted with some of the most synthetic dialogue coined by man and worn with embarrassing self-consciousness by Miss Davies and her supporting cast, the film comes so close to being the year's worst that we won't quibble about it. Let's call it the worst.
