= Julie Gibson =

American actress and singer (1913–2019)

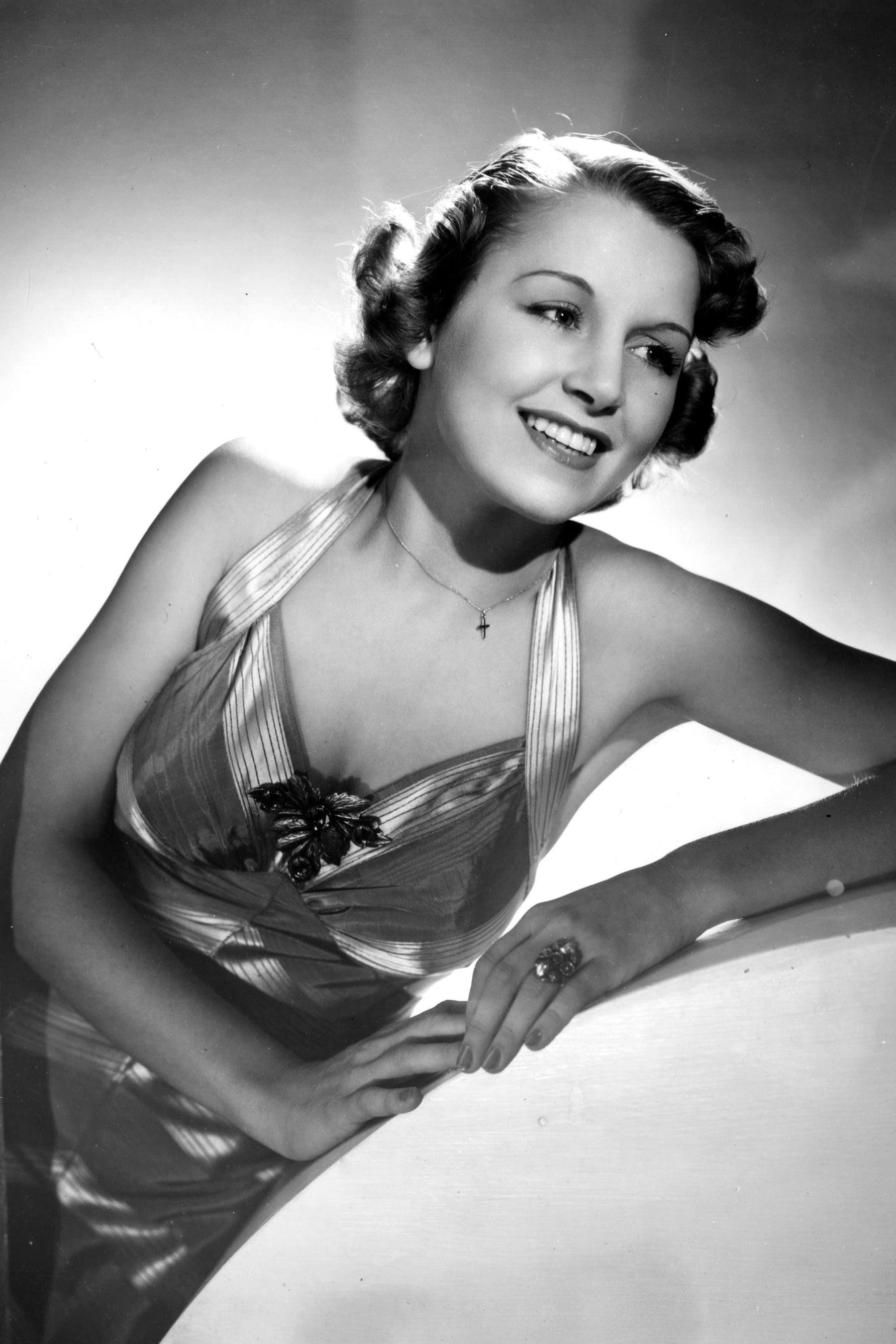
- Julie Gibson, 1937
- Born: Gladys Camille Soray; September 6, 1913; Lewiston, Idaho, U.S.
- Died: October 2, 2019 (aged 106); Los Angeles, California, U.S.
- Occupations: Actress; singer
- Years active: 1935–1984
- Spouses: Jimmy Grier (m. 1939; div. 1940) Dean Dillman Jr. (m. 1964; div. 1967) Charles Barton (m. 1973; died 1981)

Julie Gibson (born Gladys Camille Soray; September 6, 1913 – October 2, 2019) was an American singer and radio, television and film actress who had a career in movies during the 1940s. Gibson, who retired from the industry in 1984, was known for her work opposite The Three Stooges. She also collaborated with Orson Welles, John Huston, Ida Lupino and The Bowery Boys.

== Early years ==
Gibson was born in Lewiston, Idaho, on September 6, 1913, the daughter of Grover Cleveland Soray and Maude M. (née Peregrine) Soray. She graduated from Lewiston High School. She and her older sister Rea entertained local dramatics and music communities, with Julie singing and her sister playing harmony ukulele, before starting a stage act known as "Camille Soray and Her Girlfriends" that played The Granada Theatre.

== Career ==
Gibson, after performing at the Victor Club in Portland, joined Bob Young's orchestra as a soloist in 1935 performing for radio station KSL in Salt Lake City and, after winning a talent quest, joined Eddie Duchin's Orchestra paying to syndicated broadcasts from Los Angeles. She gained notice singing with the Jimmie Grier orchestra in 1937. The same year, she joined the cast of Joe Penner's radio program. She made her first film appearances in small roles in the films Nice Girl? and The Feminine Touch (both 1941). Her first featured role was in the 1944 film Lucky Cowboy. This was followed by a series of starring roles in such films as Chick Carter, Detective, Bowery Buckaroos, and Are You with It? She also appeared in the Three Stooges' films Three Smart Saps and Sock-a-Bye Baby.

"Dissatisfied with the roles she was getting, Gibson broke her contract with Paramount and departed for Paris, where she replaced Faye Emerson in a filmed weekly series, Paris Cavalcade of Fashions, for U.S. movie chains. In the French capital, Gibson became a press representative for Fox and was assigned to the Huston films Moulin Rouge (1952) and Beat the Devil (1953)."

In the 1950s, Gibson's career was relegated mostly to mid-sized to smaller supporting roles in films and on television. In the 1960s, she served as a Dialogue Supervisor on two dozen episodes of the television sitcom Family Affair. She also worked as an accent coach to help actors in films to speak appropriately for their characters' backgrounds. Gibson also dubbed vocals for Betty Hutton and Diana Lynn in some films. She also went to Europe and supplied English voices for foreign stars in Italian and French films.

== Personal life ==
On March 18, 1939, Gibson married bandleader Jimmy Grier in Tucson, Arizona. She sued for divorce from him in October 1940, and the divorce was granted on November 26, 1940. Her marriage to Dean Dillman ended in divorce in 1967. She was married to actor and film director Charles Barton from 1973 until his death in 1981. She had 5 children. Gibson was interviewed by The Three Stooges Journal in 2004. She celebrated her 105th birthday in September 2018. Gibson died in her sleep in North Hollywood, Los Angeles on October 2, 2019, aged 106.

== Filmography ==
Year	Title	Role	Notes
1941	Nice Girl?	Girl	Uncredited
1941	The Feminine Touch	Singer in Nightclub	Uncredited
1942	Here We Go Again	Girl Guide	Uncredited
1943	Let's Face It	Chorus Girl	Uncredited
1944	And the Angels Sing	Cigarette Girl	Uncredited
1944	Going My Way	Cab Driver	Uncredited
1944	The Contender	Rita Langdon	
1944	Hail the Conquering Hero	Singer	Uncredited
1944	Hi, Beautiful	Girl	Uncredited
1944	Practically Yours	Employee	Uncredited
1945	The Clock	Girl	Uncredited
1945	Duffy's Tavern	Nurse	Uncredited
1946	Chick Carter, Detective	Sherry Marvin	Serial
1947	Killer Dill	Joan - Model	
1947	Bowery Buckaroos	Katherine Briggs	
1948	Are You with It?	Ann	
1948	Blonde Ice	Mimi Doyle	Uncredited
1949	Bad Men of Tombstone	Dolly Lane	
1953	Beat the Devil		Uncredited
1958	Street of Darkness	Danielle Dubois	
