= Mr. Muggs Steps Out =

1943 film by William Beaudine

- Directed by: William Beaudine
- Written by: William Beaudine (writer); Beryl Sachs (writer)
- Produced by: Jack Dietz (producer); Sam Katzman (producer); Barney A. Sarecky (associate producer)
- Starring: See below
- Cinematography: Marcel Le Picard
- Edited by: Carl Pierson
- Production company: Monogram Pictures
- Release date: 1943
- Running time: 63 minutes
- Country: United States
- Language: English

Mr. Muggs Steps Out is a 1943 American comedy film directed by William Beaudine and starring The East Side Kids.

== Plot ==
Much to the despair of her husband John, wealthy New York socialite Margaret Morgan hires former criminals Masie O'Donnell and Butch Grogan to be her house servants. When she goes to court because her daughter Brenda has been arrested for reckless driving, Margaret is moved to hire Muggs, who has been arrested for vagrancy and being a public nuisance, after the judge insists that he get a legitimate job.

Now a chauffeur, Muggs brings the whole East Side Kids gang with him and puts them to work polishing cars. Muggs is instructed on proper etiquette, and when an engagement party is held for Brenda and her conservative fiancé Virgil, Muggs and the gang serve the food. At the end of the evening, one of the guests discovers that her diamond necklace is missing, and John accuses the East Side Kids of the theft. However, everyone recalls seeing a stranger at the party, whom Maisie now remembers as someone she met at Danceland, a dance hall on the lower East Side.

Muggs convinces John not to call the police until he and the boys have had a chance to investigate. Maisie goes downtown to Danceland with Brenda, who dresses up like a gangster's moll in order to fit in. They meet with gangster Dips Nolan and learn that he plotted the jewelry heist with Diamonds, who was the stranger at the party. Nolan becomes suspicious when naïve Virgil, who has followed Brenda to the dance hall, uses her real name and asks him to throw a fake fight so that he can prove his manhood. Nolan instead knocks Virgil out and kidnaps Brenda.

Muggs and Glimpy, meanwhile, see Diamonds leave for the dance hall and search his apartment. Although they find nothing, Diamonds and Nolan return with Brenda, and the entire East Side Kids gang captures the criminals and retrieves the diamonds. Later, Brenda is pleased to find that Virgil's East Side adventure has transformed him into a more confident and adventurous person.

== Cast ==
=== The East Side Kids ===
- Leo Gorcey as Ethelbert 'Muggs' McGinnis
- Huntz Hall as Glimpy Freedhoff
- Billy Benedict as Pinky (a.k.a. Skinny)
- Bobby Stone as Speed
- Buddy Gorman as Skinny
- David Durand as Danny
- Jimmy Strand as Rocky

=== Additional Cast ===
- Gabriel Dell as Dips Nolan
- Joan Marsh as Brenda Murray
- Patsy Moran as Maisie O'Donnell
- Eddie Gribbon as Butch Grogan
- Halliwell Hobbes as Charney, the Butler
- Stanley Brown as Virgil Wellington Brooks III
- Betty Blythe as Margaret Murray
- Emmett Vogan as John Murray
- Nick Stuart as Diamond Hamilton
- Noah Beery as Judge
- Lottie Harrison as Elizabeth, the Dowager
- Kay Marvis as Dancer
- Charles McMurphy as Cop (uncredited)

=== Notes ===
- Buddy Gorman and Jimmy Strand join the East Side Kids.
- Leo Gorcey's wife Kay Marvis appears briefly as a dancer.
