= Buddy Gorman =

American actor (1921–2010)

- Born: Charles J. Gorman; September 2, 1921; Manhattan, New York, United States
- Died: April 1, 2010 (aged 88); Webster, New York, United States
- Occupation: Actor
- Spouse: Rosa Christoff

Charles J. "Buddy" Gorman (September 2, 1921 – April 1, 2010) was an American stage and movie actor who became famous for portraying a member of the comedy teams The East Side Kids and The Bowery Boys.

== Career ==
Buddy was born and raised in the "Hell's Kitchen" area of New York. He left home after high school and hitchhiked to California in hopes of becoming an actor. He got a job in a studio mailroom and slept in a nearby used car lot until he was noticed and given small parts in movies. Although Gorman was then in his mid-twenties, his youthful appearance got him cast as streetwise teenagers. Producer Sam Katzman hired Gorman for Monogram's East Side Kids comedies with Leo Gorcey and Huntz Hall, where he was billed as Bud Gorman.

Away from the Gorcey-Hall gang, Gorman played bits in major feature films, almost always without billing. He is most noticeable in two Technicolor productions, The Jolson Story (1946, as Jimmy, the backstage call boy) and The Perils of Pauline (1947, as a heckler in a vaudeville audience).

When the East Side Kids series was reorganized as The Bowery Boys, Gorman was not part of the six-man gang but continued to participate, playing minor supporting roles. When Bennie Bartlett (playing "Butch") left the troupe, Gorman -- now billed as Buddy Gorman -- replaced him for the 1950 and 1951 seasons. Gorman bowed out of the series to get married, and Bartlett returned to replace him.

== Personal life ==
Gorman was introduced to Rosemary (Rosa) Christoff, originally of Lima, Ohio, by a mutual friend. She was working as a secretary to the art department director at NBC studios. Gorman and Christoff were married on June 17, 1951. Gorman retired from acting and opened a magic shop in North Hollywood.

The Gormans had two daughters. Soon after the girls were born, the family moved to Riverside, California, and ran a novelty/magic shop called "Fun-N-Stuff" until they retired in 1991. They were married for 46 years, until her death in 1997. In 2005, Gorman moved to an independent living community in Webster, New York.

Gorman died on April 1, 2010, in Webster, age 88.

== Partial filmography ==
- Hi Diddle Diddle (1943) - Brokerage Firm Office Boy (uncredited)
- Mr. Muggs Steps Out (1943) - Skinny
- Whistling in Brooklyn (1943) - Newsboy (uncredited)
- Higher and Higher (1943) - Page Boy (uncredited)
- Million Dollar Kid (1944) - Stinkie
- The Heavenly Body (1944) - Newsboy (uncredited)
- And the Angels Sing (1944) - Messenger (uncredited)
- Meet the People (1944) - Youth (uncredited)
- Follow the Leader (1944) - James Aloysius 'Skinny' Bogerty
- Since You Went Away (1944) - Short Private on Dance Floor (uncredited)
- I Love a Soldier (1944) - Messenger (uncredited)
- Till We Meet Again (1944) - Messenger (uncredited)
- The Very Thought of You (1944) - Telegram Boy (uncredited)
- Meet Me in St. Louis (1944) - Sidney Gorcey (uncredited)
- Bowery Champs (1944) - Shorty
- Thoroughbreds (1944) - Roberts
- Roughly Speaking (1945) - Florist's Boy (uncredited)
- Docks of New York (1945) - Danny
- It's a Pleasure (1945) - Nick (uncredited)
- The Master Key (1945, Serial) - Lug (uncredited)
- Mr. Muggs Rides Again (1945) - Danny
- Come Out Fighting (1945) - Sammy
- Meet Me on Broadway (1946) - Caddy (uncredited)
- Cinderella Jones (1946) - Audience Member Wearing Glasses (uncredited)
- The Walls Came Tumbling Down (1946) - Page Boy (uncredited)
- Night and Day (1946) - English Pageboy (uncredited)
- Bowery Bombshell (1946) - Bud, Newsboy (uncredited)
- Sing While You Dance (1946) - Ralph (uncredited)
- The Jolson Story (1946) - Jimmy, the Call Boy (uncredited)
- Wife Wanted (1946) - Newsboy (uncredited)
- The Perils of Pauline (1947) - Tomato-Thrower (uncredited)
- News Hounds (1947) - Copyboy
- Key Witness (1947) - Johnny (uncredited)
- Her Husband's Affairs (1947) - Youth (uncredited)
- Angels' Alley (1948) - Andrew T. 'Andy' Miller
- The Babe Ruth Story (1948) - Copy Boy (uncredited)
- Smugglers' Cove (1948) - Messenger Boy
- Trouble Makers (1948) - Sandy - the First Newsboy
- Fighting Fools (1949) - Page at Boxing Arena (uncredited)
- Hold That Baby! (1949) - Paper Boy (uncredited)
- It's a Great Feeling (1949) - WB Messenger Boy (uncredited)
- White Heat (1949) - Vendor at Drive-in (uncredited)
- The Reckless Moment (1949) - Magazine Clerk (uncredited)
- Blonde Dynamite (1950) - Butch, aka Bartholomew
- Lucky Losers (1950) - Butch
- A Modern Marriage (1950) - Messenger Boy
- Triple Trouble (1950) - Butch
- Blues Busters (1950) - Butch
- Bowery Battalion (1951) - Butch
- Ghost Chasers (1951) - Butch
- Let's Go Navy! (1951) - Butch (final film role)
