= In Fast Company (1946 film) =

1946 film by Del Lord

- Directed by: Del Lord
- Written by: Martin Mooney (story); Edmond Seward; Tim Ryan; Victor Hammond; Raymond Schrock
- Produced by: Jan Grippo; Lindsley Parsons
- Starring: Leo Gorcey; Huntz Hall; Bobby Jordan; William Benedict
- Cinematography: William A. Sickner
- Edited by: William Austin
- Music by: Edward J. Kay
- Distributed by: Monogram Pictures
- Release date: June 22, 1946
- Running time: 63 minutes
- Country: United States
- Language: English

In Fast Company is a 1946 American comedy film directed by Del Lord starring the comedy team of The Bowery Boys alongside Jane Randolph and Judy Clark. It is the second film in the series, which was produced by Monogram Pictures.

== Plot ==
Steve Trent, head of Red Circle Cabs, tries to buy John Cassidy's independent taxi business. When Cassidy turns him down, Trent then orders his cabbies to drive Cassidy off the road. Cassidy is injured and his cab is wrecked. Father Donovan asks Slip to take over Cassidy's hack until he has recovered. Slip turns him down but Father Donovan connives to get Slip to drive the cab. While Slip is driving Cassidy's cab, two Red Circle cabbies torment him.

Slip calls the other Boys to his aid and they disable the Red Circle cabs and do good business for the rest of the night. The next night, Slip and the boys again take on the Red Circle cabbies. Trent offers Slip a job as supervisor for Red Circle but Slip turns him down. A beautiful woman hires Slip to drive out of town but diverts him to a side street, where Red Circle employees beat him up. Returning to Cassidy's garage, Slip tells the boys that they will stay in the taxi business until Cassidy recovers. When Chuck is attacked by Red Circle, Slip declares all out war. The Boys descend on Red Circle owner Patrick McCormick's house but he is on his way to the airport and will not listen. Slip drives him to the airport but hits a police car and is arrested. Marian, McCormick's daughter, bails Slip out of jail after Father Donovan tells her the whole story. Later, Marian asks Slip to pick up her father at the airport. Meanwhile, Trent orders his drivers to destroy the Cassidy cabs and Slip.

Returning from the airport, Marian tells her father what she knows but he doesn't believe her. When a Red Circle taxi tries to run them off the road, McCormick is convinced that Slip has been telling the truth. Sure that Slip has been taken care of, Trent heads for Cassidy's garage, and there McCormick vows to put him in jail. After a fight between Trent's men and the Boys, the police take Trent and his cronies to jail and McCormick offers Cassidy a job as general manager.

== Cast ==
=== The Bowery Boys ===
- Leo Gorcey as Terrance 'Slip' Mahoney
- Huntz Hall as Sach
- Bobby Jordan as Bobby
- William Benedict as Whitey
- David Gorcey as Chuck

=== Remaining cast ===
- Bernard Gorcey as Louie
- Judy Clark as Mabel Dumbrowski
- Jane Randolph as Marian McCormick
- Douglas Fowley as Steve Trent
- Charles D. Brown as Father Donovan

== Production ==
Gorcey's father, Bernard Gorcey makes his first appearances as the owner of Louie's Sweet Shop, and it is also the first appearance of an all-out fistfight which would become a common plot element in the series.

David Gorcey's first Bowery Boys film. He would remain with the series up until the end in 1958, playing the role of 'Chuck'.

The film, made under the working title In High Gear, is a remake, with Monogram Pictures filming an earlier version in 1938.

== Home media ==
Warner Archives released the film on made-to-order DVD in the United States as part of "The Bowery Boys, Volume One" on November 23, 2012.

Preceded by Live Wires; 1946	'The Bowery Boys' movies 1946-1958	Succeeded by Bowery Bombshell; 1946
