= Chick Carter, Detective =

1946 film by Derwin Abrahams

- Directed by: Derwin Abrahams
- Written by: Harry L. Fraser; George H. Plympton
- Produced by: Sam Katzman
- Cinematography: Ira H. Morgan
- Edited by: Earl Turner
- Production company: Columbia Pictures
- Distributed by: Columbia Pictures
- Release date: July 11, 1946
- Running time: 15 minutes (per episode)
- Country: United States
- Language: English

Chick Carter, Detective is a 1946 Columbia film serial. Columbia could not afford the rights to produce a Nick Carter serial so they made Chick Carter, Detective about his son instead. This was based on the radio series Chick Carter, Boy Detective. A Nick Carter series was being made by MGM.

In a "rather strange precedent" for a serial, the title character is rarely involved in the cliffhangers. For example, the first cliffhanger revolves around the reporter Rusty rather than Carter. The film starred Lyle Talbot as Chick Carter, Douglas Fowley as Rusty Farrell, Julie Gibson as Sherry Marvin, Pamela Blake as Ellen Dale, Eddie Acuff as Spud Warner, and Robert Elliott as Dan Rankin.

== Plot ==
Detective Chick Carter (Lyle Talbot) finds himself in a complex case when Sherry Martin (Julie Gibson), a singer at the Century Club, reports the robbery of the famous Blue Diamond, owned by Joe Carney (Charles King), the owner of the nightclub. Joe planned the theft in order to pay a debt to Nick Pollo (George Meeker) with the $100,000 insurance money he would collect. Sherry double-crossed Joe by wearing an imitation one, while she threw the real one, hidden in a cotton snowball, to Nick during the floor show. But Spud Warner (Eddie Acuff), a newspaper photographer, there with newspaper reporter Rusty Farrell (Douglas Fowley), takes a snowball from her basket and Nick receives an empty one. The Blue Diamond disappears. Aided by a private investigator, Ellen Dale (Pamela Blake), Chick finds himself pitted against the criminals searching for the missing Blue Diamond...

== Cast ==
- Lyle Talbot as Chick Carter
- Douglas Fowley as Rusty Farrell
- Julie Gibson as Sherry Marvin
- Pamela Blake as Ellen Dale
- Eddie Acuff as Spud Warner
- Robert Elliot as Dan Rankin
- George Meeker as Nick Pollo
- Leonard Penn as Vasky
- Charles King as Joe Carney
- Jack Ingram as Mack
- Joel Friedkin as Jules Hoyt
- Eddie Parker as Frank Sharp

== Chapter titles ==
1. Chick Carter Takes Over
2. Jump to Eternity
3. Grinding Wheels
4. Chick Carter Trapped
5. Out of Control
6. Chick Carter's Quest
7. Chick Carter's Frame-up
8. Chick Carter Gives Chase
9. Shadows in the Night
10. Run to Earth
11. Hurled Into Space
12. Chick Carter Faces Death
13. Rendezvous with Murder
14. Chick Carter Sets a Trap
15. Chick Carter Wins Out

_{Source:}

== See also ==
- List of film serials by year
- List of film serials by studio

Preceded by Hop Harrigan (1946)	Columbia Serial; Chick Carter, Detective (1946)	Succeeded by Son of the Guardsman (1946)
