= Chick Carter, Boy Detective =

Radio crime drama

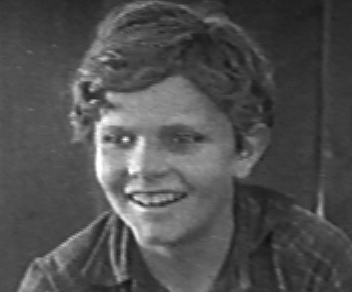
- Leon Janney played Chick Carter beginning on July 3, 1944.
- Country of origin: United States
- Language: English
- Syndicates: Mutual
- Starring: Bill Lipton; Leon Janney
- Announcer: Ken Powell
- Written by: Fritz Block; Walter B. Gibson; Ed Gruskin; Nancy Webb
- Directed by: Fritz Block
- Produced by: Charles Michelson
- Original release: July 5, 1943 – July 6, 1945

Chick Carter, Boy Detective is a 15-minute American old-time radio juvenile crime drama. It was carried on the Mutual Broadcasting System weekday afternoons from July 5, 1943, to July 6, 1945.

== Premise ==
Chickering "Chick" Carter was the adopted son of (and assistant to) Nick Carter of Nick Carter, Master Detective fame, making this program a spinoff of the elder Carter's show. Episodes of Chick Carter typically ended with a cliffhanger, enticing young listeners to tune in again for the next installment of the program. Although Chick Carter ostensibly had a young audience, both it and the older Carter program "kept fans of varying ages engrossed in their crime-stopping pursuits." Officials at WOR (AM), Mutual's flagship station in New York City, believed the duo to be "the first related pair of adult and juvenile series in radio."

Both programs were products of the Street & Smith publishing company, which 11 years earlier put The Shadow on radio to promote the company's Detective Story Magazine. The trade publication Billboard reported that the broadcasts combined "the public yen for escape with [Street & Smith's] need for protection against further cuts in paper" during World War II. Street & Smith's writers provided scripts for the programs at no charge if the shows were not sponsored.

== Inner Circle Club ==
Followers of either or both of the Carter programs could join the Inner Circle club, which provided a membership card and a folder that contained background information on the casts of the two shows. Initially, membership was available only to listeners of WOR.

== Personnel ==
Bill Lipton initially had the title role, with Leon Janney taking his place beginning July 3, 1944. Janney had been honorably discharged from the Army two weeks earlier, and Lipton was entering the Navy. Sisters Jean and Joanne McCoy played Sue, and Gilbert Mack played Tex. In supporting roles, (Neither Sue nor Tex had a last name on the program.) Bill Griffis played Rufus Lash, and Stefan Schnabel played the Rattler. Ken Powell was the announcer. Fritz Block directed and was one of the writers. Walter B. Gibson, Ed Gruskin, and Nancy Webb also wrote for the program. Charles Michelson was the producer.

== Unauthorized broadcasts ==
In 1971, Charles Michelson, president of Charles Michelson Inc. (a program distributing company in New York) threatened to launch legal action against radio stations that were airing unauthorized broadcasts of Chick Carter or any of seven other old-time radio shows for which his company held the copyrights. He said that about 300 radio stations were broadcasting at least some of the series after having bought the rights to use them. In some cases, those stations had notified Michelson of other stations in their markets that were broadcasting the programs illegally.

== Adaptations ==
- The film serial Chick Carter, Detective (1946) was based on the Chick Carter, Boy Detective program.
- Chick Carter, Boy Detective was the basis for a comic strip that ran in Shadow Comics Magazine.
