= Wee Willie Davis =

American actor (1906–1981)

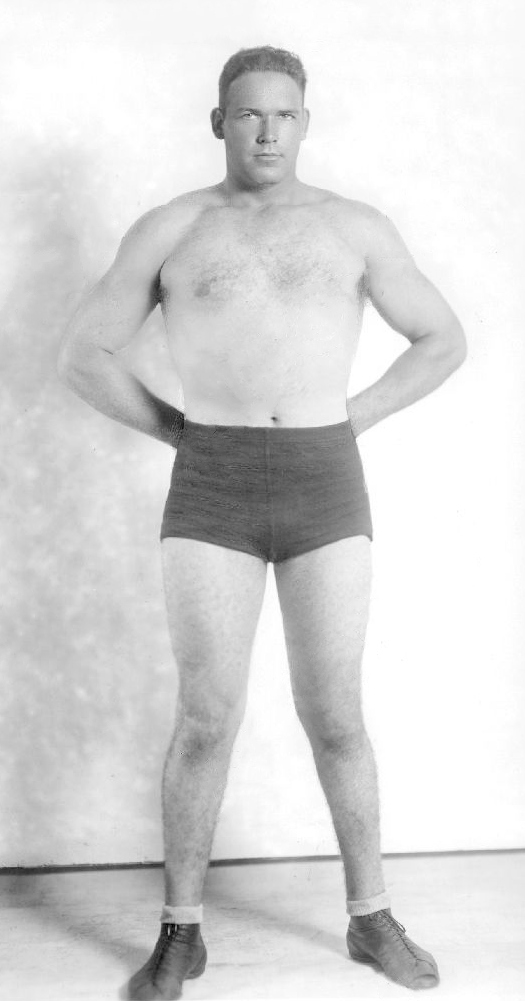
- Davis in the 1930s
- Born: William Grundy Davis; December 7, 1906; New York City, New York, U.S.
- Died: April 9, 1981 (aged 74); Louisville, Kentucky, U.S.
- Occupations: Actor, engineer, professional wrestler
- Professional wrestling career
- Ring name(s): The Black Menace; The Black Panther; Diablo #1; Dr. X The Hood; The Masked Manager; The Masked Marvel; Red Devil #1; Wee Willie Davis; Willie Davis
- Billed height: 6 ft 5 in (196 cm)
- Billed weight: 290 lb (132 kg)
- Debut: 1930
- Retired: 1961

William Grundy "Wee Willie" Davis (December 7, 1906 – April 9, 1981) was an American film actor and professional wrestler. He was born in New York City and died in Louisville, Kentucky, aged 74.

He worked in the Jefferson County Jail in Louisville in 1972–1975 as the gym guard.

He was also an engineer and contributed to the invention of the Glowmeter, an early Heads up display that projected a car's speed onto the windshield. A fellow wrestler, "Prince Ilaki Ibn Ali Hassan" (real name Agisilaki Mihalakis), who also fought as the "Mad Greek", was the primary inventor.

== Filmography ==
- Shadow of the Thin Man (1941) – Mug (uncredited)
- Reap the Wild Wind (1942) – The Lamb
- Gentleman Jim (1942) – Flannagan (uncredited)
- Arabian Nights (1942) – Valda
- Above Suspicion (1943) – Hans – Aschenhausen's Man (uncredited)
- Thumbs Up (1943) – Basil (uncredited)
- Johnny Come Lately (1943) – Bouncer
- Ali Baba and the Forty Thieves (1944) – Arab Giant (uncredited)
- Ghost Catchers (1944) – Mug (uncredited)
- Gypsy Wildcat (1944) – Dota (uncredited)
- Having Wonderful Crime (1945) – Zacharias, the Porter
- Wildfire (1945) – Henchman Moose Harris
- Pursuit to Algiers (1945) – Gubec
- Night in Paradise (1946) – Salabaar
- Beware (1946) – Tympani Five Pianist
- Bowery Bombshell (1946) – Moose McCall
- Fool's Gold (1947) – Blackie
- Calendar Girl (1947) – Swedish Tug of War Man (uncredited)
- The Foxes of Harrow (1947) – Sailor (uncredited)
- The Red Pony (1949) – Truck Driver (uncredited)
- Mighty Joe Young (1949) – Strongman (uncredited)
- Bodyhold (1949) – Harold Hocksteader aka Azusa Assassin
- Samson and Delilah (1949) – Garmiskar
- The Asphalt Jungle (1950) – Timmons
- Abbott and Costello in the Foreign Legion (1950) – Abdullah
- Aladdin and His Lamp (1952) – Gobbo (uncredited)
- The World in His Arms (1952) – 'Shanghai' Kelley (uncredited)
- Son of Paleface (1952) – Blacksmith
- To Catch a Thief (1955) – Big Man in Kitchen (uncredited)
- American Hot Wax (1978) – Freed's Friend (final film role)
