= William Benedict =

American actor (1917–1999)

Billy Benedict
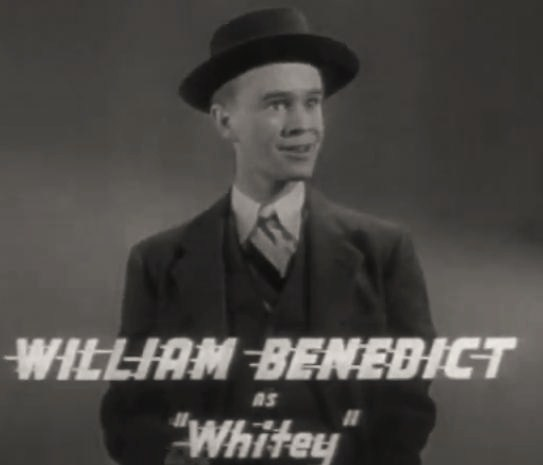
- Benedict in Adventures of Captain Marvel (1941)
- Born: April 16, 1917; Haskell, Oklahoma, U.S.
- Died: November 25, 1999 (aged 82); Los Angeles, California, U.S.
- Occupation: Actor
- Years active: 1935–1992
- Spouse: Dolly Benedict (m. 1969, divorced)

William Franklin Sater Benedict (April 16, 1917 – November 25, 1999) was an American actor, perhaps best known for playing "Whitey" in Monogram Pictures' The Bowery Boys series.

== Early years ==
Benedict was born in Haskell, Oklahoma, After his father's death when Billy was three years old, his mother supported him and his two sisters. He took part in school theatricals, and on leaving school he made his way to Hollywood.

== Career ==
Benedict's first film was $10 Raise (1935) starring Edward Everett Horton, which launched the blond-haired young man on a busy career. He almost always played juvenile roles, such as newsboys, messengers, office boys, and farmhands.

In 1939, when Universal Pictures began its Little Tough Guys series to compete with the popular Dead End Kids features, Billy Benedict was recruited into the cast. These films led him into the similar East Side Kids movies, usually playing a member of the East Side gang, but occasionally in villainous roles. The East Side Kids became The Bowery Boys in 1946, and Benedict stayed with the series, as "Whitey", to the end of 1951.

Other films included My Little Chickadee (1940) starring W. C. Fields and Mae West, The Ox-Bow Incident (1943), Ed Wood's Bride of the Monster (1955), The Sting (1973) and Farewell, My Lovely (1975). Benedict never shook his juvenile image completely, and continued to play messengers and news vendors well into his sixties. He often worked in television commercials, and in television series, including The Andy Griffith Show, All in the Family, and The Tonight Show Starring Johnny Carson.

== Death ==
Benedict died at age 82 on November 25, 1999, at Los Angeles' Cedars-Sinai Medical Center, following heart surgery.

== Selected filmography ==
Year	Film	Role	Director	Notes
1935	$10 Raise	Jimmy	George Marshall	
1935	College Scandal	'Penny' Parker	Elliott Nugent	
1935	Silk Hat Kid	Uncle Sam	H. Bruce Humberstone	uncredited
1935	Doubting Thomas	Caddie	David Butler	
1935	The Farmer Takes a Wife	Boy Announcing Dan's Arrival Before Fight	Victor Fleming	uncredited
1935	Welcome Home	Bit	James Tinling	uncredited
1935	Steamboat Round the Bend	Breck	John Ford	uncredited
1935	Ladies Love Danger	Newsboy	H. Bruce Humberstone	uncredited
1935	Way Down East	Amos	D. W. Griffith	
1935	Three Kids and a Queen	Flash	Edward Ludwig	
1935	Bad Boy	Grocery Clerk	John G. Blystone	uncredited
1935	Show Them No Mercy	Willie	George Marshall	uncredited
1935	Your Uncle Dudley	Cyril Church	Eugene Forde	
1936	The Country Doctor	The Gawker	Henry King	
1936	Captain January	Telegram Delivery Boy	David Butler	uncredited
1936	The Witness Chair	Benny Ryan	George Nicholls, Jr.	
1936	Meet Nero Wolfe	Barstow's Caddy	Herbert Biberman	
1936	M'Liss	Archer Morpher	George Nicholls, Jr.	
1936	A Son Comes Home	Cabin Boy	E.A. Dupont	uncredited
1936	Ramona	Joseph Hyar	Henry King	
1936	Adventure in Manhattan	Office Boy	Edward Ludwig	uncredited
1936	Libeled Lady	Johnny	Jack Conway	
1936	Theodora Goes Wild	Henry	Richard Boleslawski	uncredited
1936	Can This Be Dixie?	Shenandoah Peachtree		uncredited
1936	Laughing at Trouble	Wilbur	Frank R. Strayer	
1936	Crack-Up	Office Boy	Malcolm St. Clair	uncredited
1936	After the Thin Man	Blond Young Man Who Approaches Car	W. S. Van Dyke	uncredited
1937	They Wanted to Marry	Freckles	Lew Landers	
1937	Jim Hanvey, Detective	Copy Boy	Phil Rosen	uncredited
1937	That I May Live	Kurt Plivens	Allan Dwan	
1937	The Road Back	Boy Leader	James Whale	uncredited
1937	Rhythm in the Clouds	Clyde	John H. Auer	uncredited
1937	Love in a Bungalow	Telegraph boy	Ray McCarey	
1937	Flying Fists	Monk, Tall Kid	Robert F. Hill	
1937	A Dangerous Adventure	Blister	D. Ross Lederman	uncredited
1937	The Last Gangster	the Office Boy	Edward Ludwig	uncredited
1937	Tim Tyler's Luck	Spud	Wyndham Gittens	
1938	I Met My Love Again	Boy at Party	George Cukor (uncredited)	uncredited
1938	No Time to Marry	Farm Boy	Harry Lachman	uncredited
1938	Bringing Up Baby	David's Caddy	Howard Hawks	uncredited
1938	Walking Down Broadway	Eddie	Norman Foster	
1938	King of the Newsboys	Squimpy	Bernard Vorhaus	
1938	There's Always a Woman	Bellhop	Alexander Hall	uncredited
1938	Hold That Kiss	Boy Delivering Suit	Edwin L. Marin	uncredited
1938	Young Fugitives	Jud	John Rawlins	
1938	Hold That Co-ed	Sylvester	George Marshall	
1938	Little Tough Guys in Society	Trouble	Erle C. Kenton	
1938	Say It in French	Red-Haired Boy	Andrew L. Stone	uncredited
1938	Newsboys' Home	Trouble	Harold Young	
1939	Code of the Streets	Trouble	Harold Young	
1939	Man of Conquest	Tommy	George Nicholls Jr.	uncredited
1939	Timber Stampede	Printer's Devil	Kenneth Holmes (assistant)	uncredited
1939	Pack Up Your Troubles	Office Boy	H. Bruce Humberstone	uncredited
1939	Call a Messenger	Trouble	Arthur Lubin	
1940	Legion of the Lawless	Eddie	David Howard	
1940	My Little Chickadee	Lem	Edward F. Cline	uncredited
1940	And One Was Beautiful	Delivery Man	Robert B. Sinclair	uncredited
1940	Prairie Law	Teenage Voter	David Howard	uncredited
1940	Grand Ole Opry	Newsboy	Frank McDonald	uncredited
1940	Adventures of Red Ryder	Dan Withers [Ch. 1]	John English	Serial; uncredited
1940	The Great McGinty	Farm Boy	Preston Sturges	uncredited
1940	Stage to Chino	Happy	Kenneth Holmes (assistant)	uncredited
1940	Lucky Partners	Delivery Boy	Lewis Milestone	uncredited
1940	Young People	Boy	Allan Dwan	uncredited
1940	Rhythm on the River	Elevator Boy	Victor Schertzinger	uncredited
1940	The Mad Doctor	Copy Boy	Tim Whelan	uncredited
1940	Melody Ranch	Slim	Joseph Santley	
1940	Give Us Wings	Link	Charles Lamont	
1940	Second Chorus	Ticket Taker	H. C. Potter	uncredited
1940	Bowery Boy		William Morgan	
1941	The Great Mr. Nobody	Jig	Benjamin Stoloff	
1941	Scattergood Baines	Lafe Hopper	John E. Burch (assistant)	uncredited
1941	The Man Who Lost Himself	Messenger Boy	Edward Ludwig	uncredited
1941	Mr. District Attorney	Office Boy	Ed Byron	uncredited
1941	Adventures of Captain Marvel	Whitey Murphy	John English	Serial
1941	In Old Cheyenne	Train Vendor	Joseph Kane	uncredited
1941	She Knew All the Answers	Singing Telegraph Boy	Richard Wallace	
1941	Time Out for Rhythm	Messenger	Sidney Salkow	uncredited
1941	Citadel of Crime	Wes Rankins	George Sherman	
1941	The Richest Man in Town	Young Man		uncredited
1941	Dressed to Kill	Telegram Boy	Eugene J. Forde	uncredited
1941	Great Guns	Recruit at Corral	Monty Banks	uncredited
1941	Jesse James at Bay	Young Davis	Joseph Kane	uncredited
1941	Unholy Partners	Copyboy Wanting Paper	Mervyn LeRoy	uncredited
1941	Tuxedo Junction	Thomas 'Piecrust' Murphy		
1941	Cadet Girl	Soldier at Camp Show	Ray McCarey	uncredited
1941	Confessions of Boston Blackie	Ice Cream Man	Edward Dmytryk	
1942	A Tragedy at Midnight	Newsboy	Joseph Santley	uncredited
1942	On the Sunny Side	Messenger	Harold D. Schuster	
1942	Rings on Her Fingers	Newsboy	Rouben Mamoulian	
1942	Two Yanks in Trinidad	Messenger	Gregory Ratoff	uncredited
1942	The Affairs of Jimmy Valentine	Bellboy	Bernard Vorhaus	
1942	Junior G-Men of the Air	Whitey [Ch. 11]	Ray Taylor	Serial; uncredited
1942	Home in Wyomin'	Usher	William Morgan	uncredited
1942	I Live on Danger	Nightclub Waiter	Sam White	uncredited
1942	Lady in a Jam	Barker	Gregory La Cava	uncredited
1942	Perils of Nyoka	Red Davis	William Witney	
1942	The Talk of the Town	Western Union Boy	George Stevens	uncredited
1942	Wildcat	Bud Smithers	Frank McDonald	
1942	The Glass Key	Farr's Receptionist	Stuart Heisler	uncredited
1942	Mrs. Wiggs of the Cabbage Patch	Usher in Opera House	Ralph Murphy	uncredited
1942	Get Hep to Love	Soda Jerk	Charles Lamont	uncredited
1942	Valley of Hunted Men	Ranch Boy	John English	uncredited
1942	Heart of the Golden West	Telegraph Messenger	Joseph Kane	uncredited
1942	A Night to Remember	Messenger Boy	Richard Wallace	uncredited
1943	The Powers Girl	Office Boy	Norman Z. McLeod	uncredited
1943	Aerial Gunner	Pvt. Jackson 'Sleepy' Laswell	William H. Pine	
1943	Hangmen Also Die!	Kylar	Fritz Lang	uncredited
1943	Clancy Street Boys	Cherry Street Leader	William Beaudine	
1943	The Ox-Bow Incident	Greene	William A. Wellman	
1943	All by Myself	Telegraph Messenger		uncredited
1943	Ghosts on the Loose	Benny	William Beaudine	
1943	Nobody's Darling	Sammy	Anthony Mann	uncredited
1943	Adventures of the Flying Cadets	Cadet Zombie Parker	Ray Taylor	
1943	Thank Your Lucky Stars	Busboy		uncredited
1943	Mr. Muggs Steps Out	Pinky	William Beaudine	
1943	Minesweeper	Inoculations Corpsman	William Berke	uncredited
1943	Moonlight in Vermont	Abel	Edward C. Lilley	
1943	Whispering Footsteps	Jerry Murphy	Howard Bretherton	
1944	Million Dollar Kid	Skinny	Wallace Fox	
1944	Cover Girl	Florist Delivery Boy	Charles Vidor	uncredited
1944	The Whistler	The Deafmute	William Castle	uncredited
1944	Follow the Boys	Joe	A. Edward Sutherland	uncredited
1944	Follow the Leader	Spider O'Brien	William Beaudine	
1944	Goodnight Sweetheart	Bellboy	Joseph Santley	
1944	Block Busters	Butch	Wallace Fox	
1944	Janie	Soda Jerk	Michael Curtiz	uncredited
1944	That's My Baby!	Office Boy	William Berke	
1944	The Merry Monahans	Messenger	Charles Lamont	uncredited
1944	They Live in Fear	Thomas 'Mack' Knight		uncredited
1944	Bowery Champs	Skinny	William Beaudine	
1944	My Gal Loves Music	Bellboy		uncredited
1945	Night Club Girl	Winnebago boy		uncredited
1945	Youth on Trial	Soda Jerk		uncredited
1945	Brenda Starr, Reporter	Pesky [Ch 1,3,5-8,11,13]	Wallace Fox	Serial; uncredited
1945	Docks of New York	Skinny	Wallace Fox	
1945	Patrick the Great	Joey	Frank Ryan	uncredited
1945	Hollywood and Vine	Newsboy		uncredited
1945	The Story of G.I. Joe	Pvt. Whitey	William A. Wellman	uncredited
1945	Mr. Muggs Rides Again	Skinny	Wallace Fox	
1945	Come Out Fighting	Skinny	William Beaudine	
1945	Road to Utopia	Second Newsboy	Hal Walker	uncredited
1946	People Are Funny	NBC Usher	Sam White	
1946	Live Wires	Whitey	Phil Karlson	
1946	Gay Blades	Newsboy	George Blair	uncredited
1946	The Gentleman Misbehaves	Bellboy		uncredited
1946	The Kid from Brooklyn	Newsboy #2	Norman Z. McLeod	uncredited
1946	Without Reservations	Western Union Telegraph Boy	Mervyn LeRoy	uncredited
1946	Do You Love Me?	Singing Western Union Boy	Gregory Ratoff	uncredited
1946	One More Tomorrow	Bantam Office Boy	Peter Godfrey	uncredited
1946	In Fast Company	Whitey	Del Lord	
1946	A Boy, a Girl and a Dog	Messenger Boy		uncredited
1946	Bowery Bombshell	Whitey	Phil Karlson	
1946	Spook Busters	Whitey	William Beaudine	
1946	No Leave, No Love	Expectant Father on Hospital Phone	Charles Martin	uncredited
1946	Never Say Goodbye	Messenger Boy	James V. Kern	uncredited
1946	Mr. Hex	Whitey	William Beaudine	
1947	The Pilgrim Lady	Bellboy	Lesley Selander	
1947	Hard Boiled Mahoney	Whitey	William Beaudine	
1947	Fun on a Weekend	Hotel Bellboy	Andrew L. Stone	uncredited
1947	The Hucksters	Bellboy at Blue Penguin Inn	Jack Conway	uncredited
1947	News Hounds	Whitey	William Beaudine	
1947	Bowery Buckaroos	Whitey	William Beaudine	
1947	Merton of the Movies	Von Strutt's Assistant	Robert Alton	uncredited
1948	Angels' Alley	Whitey	William Beaudine	
1948	Secret Service Investigator	Counterman	R. G. Springsteen	
1948	Jinx Money	Whitey	William Beaudine	
1948	Night Wind	Irv Bennett		uncredited
1948	Smugglers' Cove	Whitey	William Beaudine	
1948	Trouble Makers	Whitey	Reginald LeBorg	
1949	Fighting Fools	Whitey	Reginald LeBorg	
1949	Riders of the Pony Express	Eddie Lund		
1949	Hold That Baby!	Whitey	Reginald LeBorg	
1949	Angels in Disguise	Whitey	Jean Yarbrough	
1949	Master Minds	Whitey	Jean Yarbrough	
1950	Blonde Dynamite	Whitey	William Beaudine	
1950	Lucky Losers	Whitey	William Beaudine	
1950	Triple Trouble	Whitey	Jean Yarbrough	
1950	Blues Busters	Whitey	William Beaudine	
1951	Bowery Battalion	Whitey	William Beaudine	
1951	Ghost Chasers	Whitey	William Beaudine	
1951	Let's Go Navy!	Whitey	William Beaudine	
1951	Crazy Over Horses	Whitey	William Beaudine	
1953	The Magnetic Monster	Albert	Herbert L. Strock (uncredited)	
1955	Bride of the Monster	Newsboy	Ed Wood	
1956	The Killing	American Airlines Clerk	Stanley Kubrick	
1958	Rally Round the Flag, Boys!	Bellhop	Leo McCarey	uncredited
1959	The Hanging Tree	Trapper	Delmer Daves	uncredited
1959	Last Train from Gun Hill	Small Man in Horseshoe	John Sturges	uncredited
1961	Lover Come Back	Musician in Elevator	Delbert Mann	uncredited
1964	Dear Heart	Stu	Delbert Mann	uncredited
1965	Zebra in the Kitchen	Toy Shop Proprietor	Ivan Tors	uncredited
1965	The Hallelujah Trail	Miner	John Sturges	
1965	Harlow	Bespectacled Hero in Movie	Gordon Douglas	uncredited
1967	What Am I Bid?	Clem		
1968	Funny Girl	Western Union Boy	William Wyler	uncredited
1968	Rogue's Gallery	Jocko	Leonard Horn	
1969	The Lottery	Joe Summers	Larry Yust	short
1969	Hello Dolly!	News Vendor	Gene Kelly	uncredited
1970	The Wacky Zoo of Morgan City	Sergeant at Arms	Marvin J. Chomsky	
1972	The Dirt Gang	Station Attendant	Jerry Jameson	
1973	The Sting	Jimmy, Roulette dealer	George Roy Hill	
1974	Homebodies	Watchman	Larry Yust	
1975	Farewell, My Lovely		Dick Richards	
1976	Won Ton Ton, the Dog Who Saved Hollywood	Man on Bus	Michael Winner	
1976	Sherlock Holmes in New York	Telegraph Office Manager	Boris Sagal	
1977	The Last Hurrah	Willie Degman	Vincent Sherman	
1978	Born Again	Leon Jaworski	Irving Rapper	

== Television ==
1960	The Rifleman	Dave Prentice	S2:E28, "Smokescreen"
1962	Dennis the Menace	Crook	S3:E22, “The Private Eye”
1967	The Monkees	Skywriter	S2:E4, "Monkee Mayor"
