= That's My Gal =

1947 film by George Blair

- Theatrical release poster
- Directed by: George Blair
- Screenplay by: Joseph Hoffman
- Story by: Frances Hyland; Bernard Feins
- Produced by: Armand Schaefer
- Starring: Lynne Roberts; Don "Red" Barry; Pinky Lee; Frank Jenks; Edward Gargan; Judy Clark
- Cinematography: Bud Thackery
- Edited by: Arthur Roberts
- Music by: Frank Perkins
- Production company: Republic Pictures
- Distributed by: Republic Pictures
- Release date: May 15, 1947
- Running time: 66 minutes
- Country: United States
- Language: English

That's My Gal is a 1947 American comedy film directed by George Blair, written by Joseph Hoffman, and starring Lynne Roberts, Don "Red" Barry, Pinky Lee, Frank Jenks, Edward Gargan and Judy Clark. It was released on May 15, 1947, by Republic Pictures.

== Cast ==
- Lynne Roberts as Natalie Adams
- Don "Red" Barry as Benny Novak
- Pinky Lee as Harry Coleman
- Frank Jenks as Louie Koblentz
- Edward Gargan as Mike
- Judy Clark as Helen McBride
- Paul Stanton as Governor Thompson
- John Hamilton as Assemblyman McBride
- Ray Walker as Danny Malone
- Marion Martin as Pepper
- Elmer Jerome as Joshua Perkins
- George M. Carleton as Judge
- St. Clair and Vilvoa as Dance Team
- The Guadalajara Trio as Singers
- Lita Baron as Isabelita
- Jan Savitt as Orchestra Leader
