= Edmond Seward =

American screenwriter

- Born: September 26, 1906; Xenia, Ohio, United States
- Died: February 12, 1954 (aged 47); Los Angeles, California, United States
- Education: Northwestern University
- Occupation: Screenwriter

Edmond Seward (26 September 1906 – 12 February 1954) was a Hollywood screenwriter who had originally attended Northwestern University and worked as a journalist, before doing some writing for Disney.

During the mid-1930s, director Ken G. Hall brought Seward to Australia to write movies and train Australian screenwriters for Cinesound Productions.

Seward ended up writing two films for Cinesound, Thoroughbred (1936) and Orphan of the Wilderness (1936), as well as adapting Thoroughbred into a novel. He soon returned to Hollywood, with Hall claiming the writer "had not been a bell-ringing success". Hall thought Seward may have been responsible for plagiarising the end of Thoroughbred from the Frank Capra film, Broadway Bill (1934).

Seward later worked for Screen Gems and wrote a number of scripts for The Bowery Boys.

== Selected filmography ==
- Walls of Gold (1933)
- Fashions of 1934 (1934) (uncredited)
- Thoroughbred (1936)
- Orphan of the Wilderness (1936)
- The Devil Is Driving (1937) – uncredited
- The Duke Comes Back (1937)
- Gulliver's Travels (1939)
- There's Something About a Soldier (1943) – short
- The Disillusioned Bluebird (1944) – short
- Mutt 'n' Bones (1944) – short
- As the Fly Flies (1944) – short
- In Fast Company (1946)
- Bowery Bombshell (1946)
- Spook Busters (1946)
- Hard Boiled Mahoney (1946)
- News Hounds (1947)
- Bowery Buckaroos (1947)
- Angels' Alley (1948)
- Jinx Money (1948)
- Smugglers' Cove (1948)
- Trouble Makers (1948)
- Fighting Fools (1949)
- Bela Lugosi Meets a Brooklyn Gorilla (1952) – additional dialogue
