= Minstrel Man (film) =

1944 film by Joseph H. Lewis, Edgar George Ulmer

- Directed by: Joseph H. Lewis; Edgar G. Ulmer (uncredited); Wallace W. Fox (uncredited)
- Screenplay by: Irwin Franklyn; Pierre Gendron
- Story by: Martin Mooney; Raymond L. Schrock
- Produced by: Leon Fromkess; Harry Revel (associate)
- Starring: Benny Fields; Gladys George
- Cinematography: Marcel Le Picard
- Edited by: Carl Pierson
- Music by: Ferde Grofé; (arranger); Leo Erdody (musical director)
- Distributed by: Producers Releasing Corporation
- Release date: August 1, 1944
- Running time: 67 minutes
- Country: United States
- Language: English
- Budget: ~$200,000

Minstrel Man is a 1944 American musical drama film directed by Joseph H. Lewis and produced by Producers Releasing Corporation (PRC). It was a vehicle for Broadway and vaudeville headliner Benny Fields.

== Plot ==
Singing star Dixie Boy Johnson and his wife Caroline are jubilant over Dixie's headlining a Broadway show and Caroline's impending motherhood. On opening night, Caroline is rushed to the hospital and Dixie begs to leave the theater and join her, but producer Lew Dunn refuses. Caroline dies in childbirth and Dixie is shattered. He leaves the baby in the care of his friends, Lasses and Mae, and drops out of sight. Presumed dead, Dixie stays undercover and takes an assumed name, as a shipboard entertainer.

Years later, Dunn grooms Dixie's daughter Caroline for stardom in a revival of Dixie's Broadway show. Dixie's former agent Bill Evans sees an opportunity to sue Dunn for damages, and arranges for Dixie to confront his daughter and his old friends.

== Cast ==
- Benny Fields as Dixie Boy Johnson
- Gladys George as Mae White
- Alan Dinehart as Lew Dunn
- Roscoe Karns as Lasses White
- Jerome Cowan as Bill Evans
- Judy Clark as Caroline (daughter, age 16)
- Molly Lamont as (Mrs.) Caroline Johnson
- John Raitt as Finale Singer
- Lee "Lasses" White as Tiny

== Production ==
Production began in late 1943, but was shut down for four weeks and retooled when various cast and crew members became unavailable. Director Joseph H. Lewis was drafted during production; he was briefly replaced by Edgar G. Ulmer and then Wallace W. Fox. Lewis was released from the army in March 1944 and completed the film.

Female lead Binnie Barnes had a prior commitment to Metro-Goldwyn-Mayer and had to drop out; she was replaced by Gladys George. The juvenile role was intended for PRC contractee Gerra Young, who was sidelined by illness; she was replaced by Judy Clark. Character comedian Lee "Lasses" White was replaced by a bigger name, Roscoe Karns; Karns's screen character is still named "Lasses White." White himself remained in the film as "Tiny," featured in the minstrel-show sequence. Production resumed after the scheduling conflicts of cast and crew were resolved.

Producer Leon Fromkess originally budgeted Minstrel Man at $80,000, slightly above average for the very-low-budget PRC studio. When Fromkess saw how well the project was progressing, he allocated more money. Composer Harry Revel co-wrote the original songs with Paul Francis Webster; Revel was equally impressed with the project and invested his own money, earning an "associate producer" credit. The final budget was "more than $200,000", according to Variety.

== Reception ==
PRC's most elaborate production was booked into many major first-run theater chains. Minstrel Man became the biggest critical and financial success the company enjoyed. The film was nominated for two Academy Awards: Best Original Score (Ferde Grofé and Leo Erdody) and Best Original Song (Harry Revel and Paul Francis Webster, for "Remember Me to Carolina").

Notices were unanimously positive. Red Kann in Motion Picture Daily: "Outstripping by seven-league strides any and all earlier efforts, PRC let out the horses on Minstrel Man and wins its own race. Here is a musical which reflects high credit on its producer and is one which other studios, more expansively geared to larger budgets, would be happy to acknowledge as their own. Minstrel Man is solid entertainment, and very good entertainment at that." Showmen's Trade Review: "Top-quality musical entertainment for any market and if it is not made a feature in first-run situations, those exhibitors will be passing up a good bet. Benny Fields's singing has a charm and style which established him as a favorite more than a generation back, and it should start his ascent toward the cinema heavens where stars like Eddie Cantor and Al Jolson already sparkle." Independent Film Journal: "A real surprise package this -- a musical melodrama that carries story weight, and packs a tear-jerking wallop that is balanced in grand style by intelligent and splendorous musical interpolations. In short, it clicks as a good feature, highly worthy of serious consideration by everyone in show business. Excellent entertainment." Movieland: "Fine direction, artful camerawork, and considered casting with catchy songs put over in the inimitable Fields style, make it a musical that rates being called 'unusual'." Harrison's Reports: "Produced on a higher-than-average budget, Minstrel Man is a very entertaining musical drama, representing PRC's most ambitious effort to date; it is a big step forward for the company. It should prove to be a highly satisfactory supporting feature in most situations, and strong enough too top a double bill in others. Benny Fields, whose picture debut [in a starring role] this is, gives an engaging dramatic performance, and his renditions of a number of melodious tunes are pleasant to the ear."

== Songs ==
- "Remember Me to Carolina" (Harry Revel, Paul Francis Webster; Academy Award nominee) – Benny Fields
- "I Don't Care If the World Knows About It" (Revel, Webster) – Fields; reprise by Judy Clark
- "Cindy" (Revel, Webster) – Fields; reprise by Clark
- "My Bamboo Cane" (Revel, Webster) – Fields
- "My Melancholy Baby" (Ernie Burnett, George A. Norton) – Fields
- "Shaking Hands with the Sun" (Revel, Webster) – John Raitt
- "Minstrel Man" – Minstrel chorus, danced by Johnny Boyle
