= Judy Clark =

American actress and singer (1921–2002)

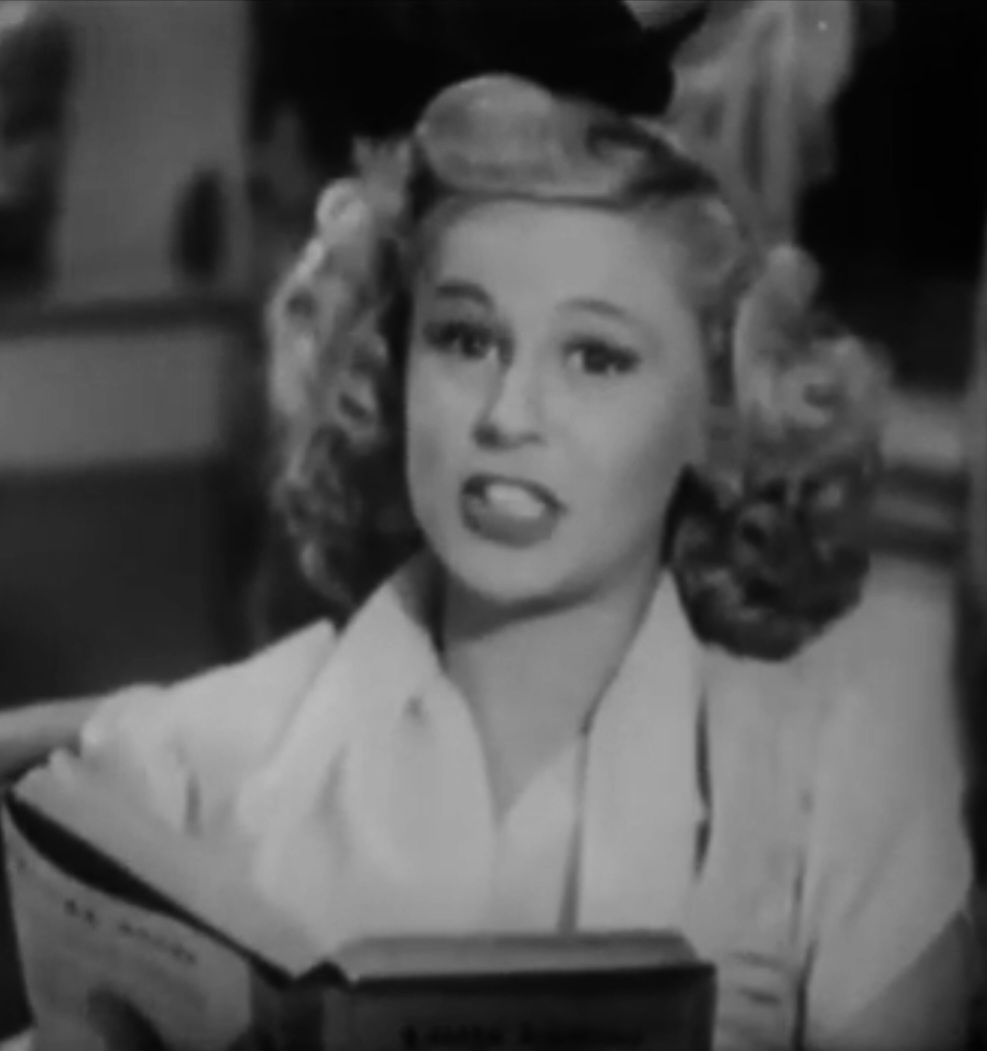
- Clark in The Kid Sister (1945)
- Born: June 9, 1921; Rockville Center, New York, U.S.
- Died: December 27, 2002 (aged 81); Alexandria, Virginia, U.S.
- Occupation: Actress
- Years active: 1942–1962
- Spouses: George Myers (m. 1949; div. 1950) William Jerome Otto (m. 1953; div. 1953) Ron Zalimas (m. 1956–2002)

Judy Clark (June 9, 1921 – December 27, 2002) was an American film and television actress and singer. Clark adopted a brash and energetic singing style, similar to that of musical-comedy star Betty Hutton.

== Early life ==
Clark was the daughter of Jack Kaufman, who was a vaudeville performer. She and comedian Jack Gilford were among the new faces in the stage show Meet the People; Universal Pictures signed both for the Gloria Jean musical Reckless Age (1944). Clark and Gilford also appeared in the Columbia Pictures musical Hey, Rookie (1944).

Clark won the juvenile lead in the 1944 Benny Fields musical Minstrel Man, in which she delivered two songs in the Betty Hutton manner. The role reflected Clark's own life, as a rising star in a theatrical family. She continued to work in pictures through the mid-1940s, including the Joan Davis musical comedy Beautiful but Broke (1944), the Cinderella-styled comedy The Kid Sister (1945), the Freddie Stewart musical Junior Prom (1946), In Fast Company with The Bowery Boys (1946), and the Jean Porter musical Two Blondes and a Redhead (1947). Beginning in 1949, with fewer musicals being made, she worked in the action/adventure field, in two serials, Bruce Gentry and Desperadoes of the West. Altogether she appeared in more than two dozen films and several television productions.

== Stage ==
Clark's work as a singer included performing with Jimmy McHugh's Hollywood Singing Stars. She also fronted a vocal group, Judy Clark and the Solid Senders. She danced and sang in the stage musical Lend an Ear at the Las Palmas Theater.

== Personal life ==
Clark was diagnosed with anemia, resulting in pain in both ankles and thus forcing her to give up dancing.

On October 1, 1949, Clark married businessman George Myers in Los Angeles. They were divorced on July 14, 1950. In 1953 she married William Jerome Otto, 24-year-old heir to a drug chain; the union was unsuccessful and she sued for divorce nine months later, asking to be repaid $625 that he had borrowed. In 1956 she met her future husband, Ron Zalimas, on the set of a Burns and Allen TV show. He was 15 years her junior, but they remained married until her death in 2002.

== Filmography ==
- South of Santa Fe (1942)
- Chatterbox (1943)
- Swing Your Partner (1943)
- Beautiful But Broke (1944)
- Career Girl (1944)
- Hey, Rookie (1944)
- Minstrel Man (1944)
- Reckless Age (1944)
- Stars on Parade (1944)
- This Is the Life (1944)
- Night Club Girl (1945)
- Penthouse Rhythm (1945)
- The Kid Sister (1945)
- The Strange Affair of Uncle Harry (1945)
- In Fast Company (1946)
- Junior Prom (1946)
- That's My Gal (1947)
- Two Blondes and a Redhead (1947)
- Bruce Gentry – Daredevil of the Skies (1949)
- Desperadoes of the West (1950)
- The Girl on the Bridge (1951)
- The Crooked Web (1955)
- House of Women (1962)
