= Marcia Ralston =

Australian-born actress

- Born: Marie Mascotte Ralston; 19 September 1906
- Died: 23 November 1988 (aged 82); Rancho Mirage, California, United States
- Other name: Mascotte Ralston
- Occupation: Actress
- Years active: 1933–1976
- Spouses: Phil Harris (m. 1927; div. 1940) Bud Henderson (m. 1954)
- Children: 1
- Relatives: Robert Young (brother-in-law)

Marcia Mascotte Ralston (19 September 1906 – 23 November 1988) was an Australian-born American actress who appeared in Hollywood films in the 1930s and 1940s.

== In Australia ==
Ralston's father was well known Australian singer and actor John Ralston. She attended Bethlehem College, Ashfield and won third place in a 1926 Miss Australia competition. Known as Mascotte Ralston, she won a place in J. C. Williamson's Musical Comedy Company, working her way up from the chorus until she was playing Lili in Lilac Time. She had a leading part in the "comedy mystery" The Ghost Train from January 1927, and during its run she met drummer Phil Harris and they married on 2 September 1927, then moved to California. She had a Warner Bros. contract by 1937 and appeared in a number of supporting and leading roles, mostly in B films.

== Career in Hollywood ==
Ralston's marriage to Harris ended in divorce in 1940. She continued to act in various bit parts and supporting roles until the late 1940s. Work after this included instructing for the Arthur Murray dance studio in the early 1950s. Ralston married Bud Henderson in 1954. Henderson's sister Betty was married to actor Robert Young. The connection resulted in an occasional supporting role as Nurse Donnelly in the TV series Marcus Welby, M.D. in the early 1970s. Ralston died at Rancho Mirage, California in 1988.

== Filmography ==
Year	Title	Role	Notes
1933	Night Flight	Nightclub Vamp	Uncredited
1934	Hollywood Party	Show Girl	Uncredited
1937	Her Husband's Secretary	Mrs. Garron	(scenes deleted)
1937	Call It a Day	Beatrice Gwynn	
1937	Fly Away Baby	Ila Sayre	
1937	Ever Since Eve	Camille Lansing	
1937	The Singing Marine	Helen Young	
1937	Sh! The Octopus	Vesta Vernoff	
1937	Missing Witnesses	Mabel Jones	Uncredited
1938	Gold Is Where You Find It	Molly Featherstone	
1938	Fools for Scandal	Jill	
1938	Men Are Such Fools	Wanda Townsend	
1938	Crime Takes a Holiday	Margaret 'Peggy' Stone	
1941	San Antonio Rose	Diner	Uncredited
1941	The Kid from Kansas	Linda Walker	
1941	Never Give a Sucker an Even Break	Stewardess	Uncredited
1941	Sea Raiders	Leah Carlton	Serial
1941	Keep 'Em Flying	USO Girl	Uncredited
1941	Paris Calling	Renee	
1942	Sunday Punch	Blonde	Uncredited
1947	Out of the Blue	Patricia	Uncredited
