= Ghost Chasers =

1951 film by William Beaudine

- Theatrical release poster
- Directed by: William Beaudine
- Written by: Charles Marion; Bert Lawrence
- Produced by: Jan Grippo
- Starring: Leo Gorcey; Huntz Hall; David Gorcey; William Benedict
- Cinematography: Marcel LePicard
- Edited by: William Austin
- Music by: Edward J. Kay
- Distributed by: Monogram Pictures
- Release date: April 29, 1951
- Running time: 69 minutes
- Country: United States
- Language: English

Ghost Chasers is a 1951 comedy horror film starring the Bowery Boys. The film was released on April 29, 1951 by Monogram Pictures and is the 22nd film in the Bowery Boys series.

== Plot ==
After Slip discovers a spiritualist in the neighborhood, he enlists the boys to investigate. They discover that she is a fake who is working for Margo the Medium, a radio star who has convinced Sach and Whitey that ghosts exist.

The boys visit her, using Louie as a decoy. While she is busy trying to connect to Louie's dead uncle, the rest of the boys investigate the house. A real ghost named Edgar befriends Sach and helps him investigate. Although the others cannot see Edgar, he helps them uncover Margo's scam.

== Cast ==
=== The Bowery Boys ===
- Leo Gorcey as Terrance Aloysius 'Slip' Mahoney
- Huntz Hall as Horace Debussy 'Sach' Jones
- William Benedict as Whitmore 'Whitey' Williams
- David Gorcey as Chuck
- Buddy Gorman as Butch

=== Remaining cast ===
- Bernard Gorcey as Louie Dumbrowski
- Lloyd Corrigan as Edgar Alden Franklin Smith
- Jan Kayne as Cynthia
- Robert Coogan as Jack Eagan, Private Eye
- Lela Bliss as Margo the Medium
- Philip Van Zandt as Dr. Basil Granville
- Marshall Bradford as Professor Krantz
- Michael Ross as Gus
- Argentina Brunetti as Mama Parelli
- Belle Mitchell as Madame Zola
- Doris Kemper as Mrs. Mahoney

== Home media ==
The film was released on VHS by Warner Bros. on September 1, 1992.

Warner Archives released the film on made-to-order DVD in the United States as part of The Bowery Boys, Volume Two on April 9, 2013.

Preceded by Bowery Battalion; 1951	'The Bowery Boys' movies 1946-1958	Succeeded by Let's Go Navy! 1951
