= The Kid Sister =

1945 film by Sam Newfield

- Directed by: Sam Newfield
- Written by: Fred Myton (screenplay); Fred Myton (story)
- Produced by: Sigmund Neufeld (producer)
- Starring: See below
- Cinematography: James S. Brown Jr.
- Edited by: Holbrook N. Todd
- Music by: Albert Glasser
- Distributed by: Producers Releasing Corporation
- Release date: 1945
- Running time: 56 minutes; 25 minutes (American edited TV version)
- Country: United States
- Language: English

The Kid Sister is a 1945 American comedy drama film directed by Sam Newfield.

The film is also known as All in the Family (American alternative title).

== Plot summary ==
Joan Hollingsworth's mother orders her to remain in her bedroom during a party for older sister Ethel, whose beau J. Waldo Barnes is the guest of honor. Tired of her sister always being favored, Joan sneaks out of the house and runs into a burglar who is thinking about robbing it.

A police officer comes along so Joan, not wanting to get arrested but also not wanting her mother to discover what she's up to, convinces the cop that she's employed for the party as a maid. She goes back inside and tries not to be found out, successful right up to the very end.

== Cast ==
- Roger Pryor as J. Waldo Barnes
- Judy Clark as Joan Hollingsworth
- Frank Jenks as Burglar
- Constance Worth as Ethel Hollingsworth
- Tom Dugan as Michael the Cop
- Richard Byron as Tommy
- Minerva Urecal as Mrs. Wiggins
- Ruth Robinson as Mrs. Hollingsworth
- Peggy Wynne as Martha
