= Jinx Money =

1948 film by William Beaudine

- Directed by: William Beaudine
- Written by: Edmond Seward; Tim Ryan; Gerald Schnitzer
- Produced by: Jan Grippo
- Starring: Leo Gorcey; Huntz Hall; William Benedict; Gabriel Dell; Bennie Bartlett; Sheldon Leonard
- Cinematography: Marcel Le Picard
- Edited by: William Austin
- Music by: Edward J. Kay
- Distributed by: Monogram Pictures
- Release date: June 27, 1948
- Running time: 68 minutes
- Language: English

Jinx Money is a 1948 American comedy film directed by William Beaudine and starring the comedy team of The Bowery Boys. It is the tenth film in the series and the first one to include Bennie Bartlett as part of the team.

== Plot ==
Pollack, an underworld gambler, is murdered, but before he dies he hides $50,000 that he just won gambling in a newspaper and kicks it under a car. The next day Sach and Slip are walking in the street and find the paper and the cash. Gabe, who is a reporter, runs a story on them finding the money and the gangsters that Pollack won the money from come looking for them. One by one they take the money from the boys and are immediately killed by the mysterious "umbrella". Eventually the boys get tired of having the money taken from them and people dying around them so they hand the money over to the police. The "umbrella", not knowing that the boys no longer have the money, comes to collect it from them and is captured by the police who were staking the boys hideout waiting for the killer.

After a short period of time the police return the money to the boys since no one has claimed it. They immediately hand over $38,000 to various charities that they promised the money to. Just as they were celebrating an IRS officer arrives and collects the remaining $12,000 for taxes and they are left broke and still owing Louie $5.00. As they leave the Sweet Shop they see a $5.00 bill on the street and scramble for it, with Slip finally getting it. But his possession of it does not last long as Louie steps in and takes it to settle their tab with him.

== Cast ==
=== The Bowery Boys ===
- Leo Gorcey as Terrance Aloysius 'Slip' Mahoney
- Huntz Hall as Horace Debussy 'Sach' Jones
- William Benedict as Whitey
- David Gorcey as Chuck
- Bennie Bartlett as Butch

=== Remaining cast ===
- Gabriel Dell as Gabe
- Bernard Gorcey as Louie Dumbrowski
- Sheldon Leonard as Lippy Harris
- Donald MacBride as Lt. Broderick
- Ben Weldon as Benny the meatball
- Betty Caldwell as Candy

== Home media ==
Warner Archives released the film on made-to-order DVD in the United States as part of "The Bowery Boys, Volume Three" on October 1, 2013.

Preceded by Angels' Alley; 1948	'The Bowery Boys' movies 1946-1958	Succeeded by Smugglers' Cove; 1948
