= Allen Jenkins =

American actor (1900–1974)

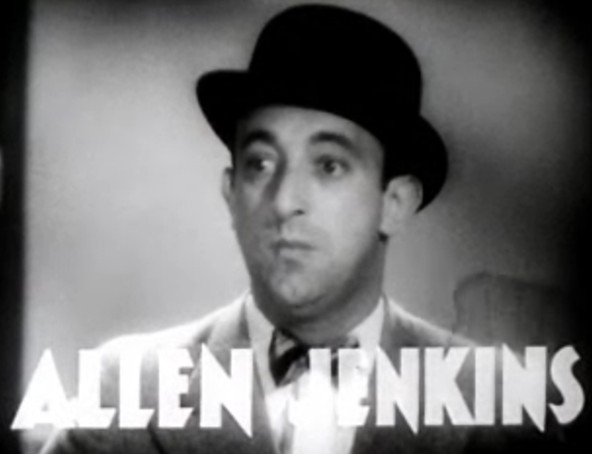
- Jenkins in Havana Widows (1933)
- Born: Allen Curtis Jenkins; April 9, 1900; Staten Island, New York, U.S.
- Died: July 20, 1974 (aged 74); Santa Monica, California, U.S.
- Occupations: Actor, voice actor, singer
- Years active: 1923–1974
- Spouse: Mary Landee
- Children: 3

Allen Curtis Jenkins (April 9, 1900 – July 20, 1974) was an American character actor, voice actor and singer who worked on stage, film, and television. He may be best known to some audiences as the voice of Officer Charlie Dibble in the Hanna-Barbera TV cartoon series Top Cat (1961–62).

== Life and career ==
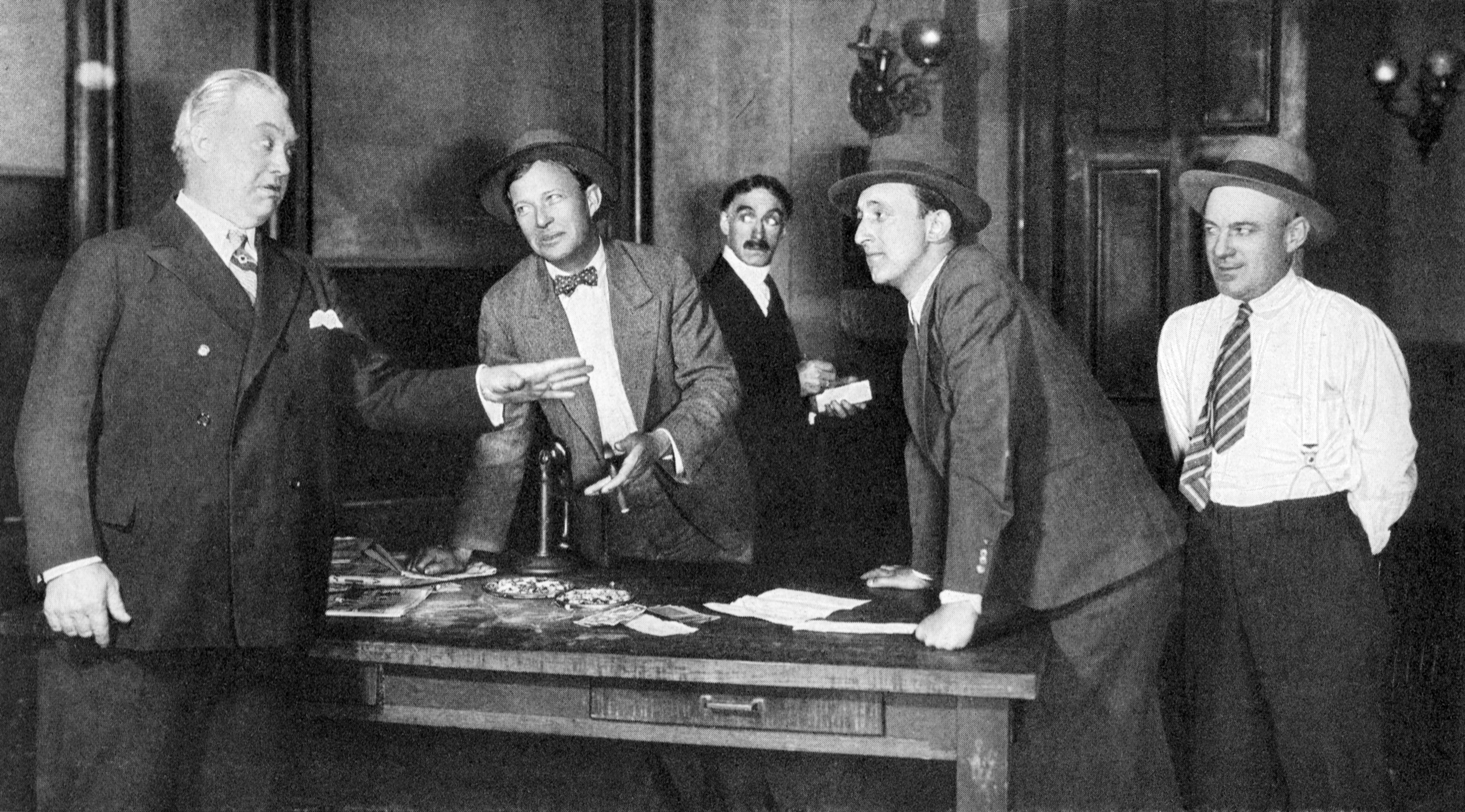
George Barbier, Willard Robertson, Claude Cooper, Allen Jenkins and William Foran in the original Broadway production of The Front Page (1928)

Jenkins was born on Staten Island, New York, on April 9, 1900. He is sometimes reported as having been born with the name Alfred McGonegal, but his birth, census and draft card records, as well as his New York Times obituary indicate he was born Allen Curtis Jenkins, the son of actor Robert Oliver Jenkins (1860–1909) and musical performer and teacher Leona Jenkins (born Leonora Cooley), (1864–1935).

Jenkins's father, born in Baltimore, was descended from a colonial Catholic family who settled Maryland in the early 1600s. His mother's family were mainly New England Yankees from Massachusetts and Vermont. In fact, Jenkins's maternal grandfather and great-grandfather were both named Ebenezer Cooley.

Jenkins had been a stage actor since 1922. He signed a seven-year contract with Warner Bros. in 1932 and established himself quickly as a gloom-faced, wisecracking character player, useful in comedies, dramas, and musicals (he was an accomplished dancer). Though mainly of English and Welsh descent, he was considered a member of Hollywood's so-called "Irish Mafia", a group of Irish-American actors and friends which included Spencer Tracy, James Cagney, Pat O'Brien, and Frank McHugh. His Warner agreement was non-exclusive so he could appear in films for other studios, such as Whirlpool (as Jack Holt's sidekick) and Dead End (as Humphrey Bogart's sidekick).

After his Warner agreement lapsed, Jenkins freelanced for the rest of his career. After World War II, when Hollywood studios made fewer feature films, Jenkins found work at lesser studios, including those of Robert L. Lippert, Monogram Pictures, and Republic Pictures. He also began appearing in the new field of television.

In 1959, Jenkins played the role of elevator operator Harry in the comedy Pillow Talk. He was a regular on the television sitcom Hey, Jeannie! (1956–57), starring Jeannie Carson and often portrayed Muggsy on the 1950s–1970s CBS series The Red Skelton Show. He was also a guest star on many other television programs, such as The Man from U.N.C.L.E., Mr. and Mrs. North, I Love Lucy, Playhouse 90, The Tab Hunter Show, The Ernie Kovacs Show, Zane Grey Theater, and Your Show of Shows. He had a cameo appearance in It's a Mad, Mad, Mad, Mad World (1963). Eleven days before his death, he made his final appearance, at the end of Billy Wilder's remake of The Front Page (1974); it was released posthumously.

== Death ==
Jenkins died of lung cancer on July 20, 1974, at age 74. His body was cremated, and the ashes were scattered at sea.

== Complete filmography ==
=== Film ===
- Straight and Narrow (1931, Short) as Ex-convict
- The Girl Habit (1931) as Tony Maloney
- Grand Hotel (1932) as Hotel Meat Packer (uncredited)
- Blessed Event (1932) as Frankie Wells
- Rackety Rax (1932) as Mike Dumphy
- Three on a Match (1932) as Dick
- I Am a Fugitive from a Chain Gang (1932) as Barney Sykes
- Lawyer Man (1932) as Izzy Levine
- Employees' Entrance (1933) as Sweeney (uncredited)
- Hard to Handle (1933) as Radio Announcer
- 42nd Street (1933) as Mac Elroy
- Blondie Johnson (1933) as Louie
- The Keyhole (1933) as Hank
- The Mind Reader (1933) as Frank
- Tomorrow at Seven (1933) as Dugan
- Professional Sweetheart (1933) as O'Connor
- The Silk Express (1933) as Robert "Rusty" Griffith
- The Mayor of Hell (1933) as Mike
- Bureau of Missing Persons (1933) as Joe Musik
- 'Tis Spring (1933, Short)
- Havana Widows (1933) as Herman Brody
- The Big Shakedown (1934) as Lefty
- Bedside (1934) as Sam Sparks
- I've Got Your Number (1934) as Johnny
- Jimmy the Gent (1934) as Lou
- Whirlpool (1934) as Mac
- Twenty Million Sweethearts (1934) as Pete
- The Merry Frinks (1934) as Emmett Frinks
- The Case of the Howling Dog (1934) as Sgt. Halcomb
- Happiness Ahead (1934) as Chuck
- The St. Louis Kid (1934) as Buck
- Fools for Scandal (1934) as Dewey Gilson
- Sweet Music (1935) as Barney Cowan
- A Night at the Ritz (1935) as Gyp Beagle
- While the Patient Slept (1935) as Jackson
- The Case of the Curious Bride (1935) as Spudsy Drake
- The Irish in Us (1935) as 'Carbarn'
- Page Miss Glory (1935) as Patsy
- I Live for Love (1935) as Mac
- The Case of the Lucky Legs (1935) as Spudsy Drake
- Miss Pacific Fleet (1935) as Bernard "Kewpie" Wiggins
- Broadway Hostess (1935) as Fishcake
- The Singing Kid (1936) as Joe Eddy
- Sins of Man (1936) as Crusty
- Cain and Mabel (1936) as Aloysius K. Reilly
- Three Men on a Horse (1936) as Charlie
- Sing Me a Love Song (1936) as "Chris" Cress
- Ready, Willing, and Able (1937) as J. Van Courtland
- Marked Woman (1937) as Louie
- A Day at Santa Anita (1937 short) as Allen Jenkins (uncredited)
- Ever Since Eve (1937) as Jake Edgall
- The Singing Marine (1937) as Sergeant Mike Kelly
- Dance Charlie Dance (1937) as Alf Morgan
- Marry the Girl (1937) as Spees
- Dead End (1937) as Hunk
- The Perfect Specimen (1937) as Pinky
- Sh! The Octopus (1937) as Dempsey
- Swing Your Lady (1938) as Shiner
- A Slight Case of Murder (1938) as Mike
- Fools for Scandal (1938) as Dewey Gilson
- Gold Diggers in Paris (1938) as Duke "Dukie" Dennis
- Racket Busters (1938) as 'Sheets' Wilson
- The Amazing Dr. Clitterhouse (1938) as Okay
- Hard To Get (1938) as Roscoe
- Heart of the North (1938) as Cpl. Bill Hardsock
- Going Places (1938) as Droopy
- Sweepstakes Winner (1939) as Xerxes "Tip" Bailey
- Naughty but Nice (1939) as Joe Dirk
- Five Came Back (1939) as Pete
- Torchy Blane... Playing with Dynamite (1939) as Lt. Steve McBride
- Destry Rides Again (1939) as Gyp Watson
- Oh Johnny, How You Can Love (1940) as Ed, aka "The Weasel"
- Brother Orchid (1940) as Willie "the Knife" Corson
- Margie (1940) as Kenneth
- Meet the Wildcat (1940) as Max Schwydel
- Tin Pan Alley (1940) as Casey
- Footsteps in the Dark (1941) as Wilfred
- Time Out for Rhythm (1941) as Off-Beat Davis
- Dive Bomber (1941) as 'Lucky' James
- The Gay Falcon (1941) as Jonathan "Goldie" Locke
- Go West, Young Lady (1941) as Deputy Hank
- Ball of Fire (1941) as Garbage Man
- A Date with the Falcon (1942) as Jonathan "Goldie" Locke
- Tortilla Flat (1942) as Portagee Joe
- The Falcon Takes Over (1942) as Jonathan "Goldie" Locke
- Maisie Gets Her Man (1942) as "Pappy" Goodring
- They All Kissed the Bride (1942) as Johnny Johnson
- Eyes in the Night (1942) as Marty
- My Wife's an Angel (1943, Short)
- Stage Door Canteen (1943) as Himself
- Wonder Man (1945) as Chimp
- Lady on a Train (1945) as Danny
- Voice of the Whistler (1945) as a restaurant patron (uncredited)
- Meet Me on Broadway (1946) as Deacon Trimble
- The Dark Horse (1946) as Willis Trimble
- Singin' in the Corn (1946) as Glen Cummings
- Easy Come, Easy Go (1947) as Nick
- Fun on a Weekend (1947) as Joe Morgan
- The Hat Box Mystery (1947) as "Harvard"
- The Case of the Baby Sitter (1947 short) as Howard "Harvard" Quinlan
- Wild Harvest (1947) as Higgins
- The Senator Was Indiscreet (1947) as Farrell
- The Inside Story (1948) as Eddie
- The Big Wheel (1949) as George
- Bodyhold (1949) as Slats Henry
- Let's Go Navy! (1951) as CPO Mervin Longnecker
- Behave Yourself! (1951) as Plainsclothesman
- Crazy Over Horses (1951) as Weepin' Willie
- Chained for Life (1951) as Hinkley
- Oklahoma Annie (1952) as Coffin Creek Café Bartender Lou
- The WAC from Walla Walla (1952) as Mr. Reddington
- Pillow Talk (1959) as Harry
- It's a Mad, Mad, Mad, Mad World (1963) as Policeman (uncredited)
- For Those Who Think Young (1964) as Col. Leslie Jenkins
- Robin and the 7 Hoods (1964) as Vermin
- I'd Rather Be Rich (1964) as Fred
- The Spy in the Green Hat (1967) as Enzo "Pretty" Stilletto
- Doctor, You've Got to Be Kidding! (1967) as Joe Bonney
- Getting Away from It All (1972, TV Movie) as Doorman
- The Front Page (1974) as Telegrapher (final film role)

== Partial television credits ==
- The Abbott and Costello Show (1953, episode "The Actors' Home") as Retired Actors Home Man on Street
- I Love Lucy (1952–1953) (three episodes) as Policeman/Officer Jenkins/Police Sergeant
- The Red Skelton Hour (1954–1962) (11 episodes) as Muggsy, a friend of Red Skelton's character Freddie the Freeloader
- Hey, Jeannie! (1956–57) (26 episodes) as Al Murray, a cabbie
- Wagon Train (1960, episode "The Horace Best Story") as Mr. Gillespie
- The Tab Hunter Show (1961, episode "Sultan for a Day") as Frenchy
- Top Cat (1961–1962) (30 episodes) as Officer Charlie Dibble (voice)
- The Real McCoys (1962, episode "Army Reunion") as Skinny Howard
- The Man from U.N.C.L.E. (1966, episodes "The Concrete Overcoat Affair: Parts 1 & 2") as Enzo "Pretty" Stilletto
- Batman (1967, episode "Scat! Darn Catwoman") as Little Al (uncredited)
- Bewitched (1971–1972) as Janitor / Cabbie / Alex Johnson
- Adam-12 (TV Series) (1971) episode S4:E9 "Anniversary" - Jobey (bartender)
