= Sh! The Octopus =

1937 film by William C. McGann

- Promotional release poster
- Directed by: William McGann
- Screenplay by: George Bricker
- Based on: The Gorilla (1925 play) by Ralph Spence and Sh! The Octopus (1928 play) by Ralph Spence; Ralph Murphy; Donald Gallaher
- Produced by: Jack L. Warner
- Starring: Hugh Herbert; Allen Jenkins; Marcia Ralston
- Cinematography: Arthur Todd
- Edited by: Clarence Kolster
- Music by: Heinz Roemheld (uncredited)
- Production company: Warner Bros. Pictures
- Distributed by: Warner Bros. Pictures
- Release date: December 11, 1937
- Running time: 54 minutes
- Country: United States
- Language: English

Sh! The Octopus is a 1937 American comedy mystery film produced by Warner Bros. Pictures, directed by William McGann, and starring Hugh Herbert, Allen Jenkins and Marcia Ralston. While contract players Herbert and Jenkins frequently appeared in the same picture, this is the only film to present them as an actual team.

In 2022, the film garnered attention on social media for a character transformation scene that was accomplished using practical effects with a combination of makeup and graduated filters.

== Plot ==
Two bumbling detectives are in pursuit of a master criminal, The Octopus. They find themselves inside a haunted lighthouse full of suspicious characters, including the titular character, who appears to be an actual octopus.

== Cast ==
- Hugh Herbert as Kelly
- Allen Jenkins as Dempsey
- Marcia Ralston as Vesta Vernoff
- John Eldredge as Paul Morgan
- George Rosener as Captain Hook
- Margaret Irving as Polly Crane
- Elspeth Dudgeon as Nanny
- Lew Harvey as Sinister plotter
- Frank Hagney as Sinister plotter
- Ed Biby as Sinister plotter
- Molly Doyle as Nurse
- Jack Jorgensen as Sinister plotter

== Other media ==
In 2010, the film was released by Warner Archive as part of the six-film DVD-R collection Warner Bros. Horror/Mystery Double Features.

It also airs occasionally on Turner Classic Movies.
