= Bowery Battalion =

1951 film by William Beaudine

- Theatrical poster to Bowery Battalion
- Directed by: William Beaudine
- Written by: Charles Marion; Bert Lawrence
- Produced by: Jan Grippo
- Starring: Leo Gorcey; Huntz Hall; David Gorcey; William Benedict
- Cinematography: Marcel LePicard
- Edited by: William Austin
- Music by: Edward J. Kay
- Distributed by: Monogram Pictures
- Release date: January 24, 1951 (U.S.)
- Running time: 69 minutes
- Country: United States
- Language: English

Bowery Battalion is a 1951 comedy film directed by William Beaudine and starring the Bowery Boys. The film was released on January 24, 1951, by Monogram Pictures and is the 21st film in the series.

== Plot ==
The military is performing a practice air raid on New York City. Sach convinces the boys that it is real and they visit the recruitment office to enlist. Slip learns of their mistake and tries to stop them, but he is too late, as they have already joined, and Slip is also tricked into enlisting.

Louie tries to enlist but is rejected as he is too old. He had fought in World War I and had invented a "hydrogen ray" that did not work as intended. However, the army is using the plans for the ray as a decoy to capture spies at the base to which the boys have been assigned. The army reinstates Louie to use him as bait for the spies. He is kidnapped by the spies who try to force him to divulge the secrets of the ray. The boys come to his rescue and are rewarded with medals for bravery but are sent to the brig for leaving their posts to rescue Louie.

== Cast ==
=== The Bowery Boys ===
- Leo Gorcey as Terrance Aloysius 'Slip' Mahoney
- Huntz Hall as Horace Debussy 'Sach' Jones
- William Benedict as Whitey
- David Gorcey as Chuck
- Buddy Gorman as Butch

=== Remaining cast ===
- Bernard Gorcey as Louie Dumbrowski
- Donald MacBride as Frisbie
- Virginia Hewitt as Marsha
- Russell Hicks as Hatfield
- Emil Sitka as the waiter

== Home media ==
Warner Archives released the film on made-to-order DVD in the United States as part of The Bowery Boys, Volume Four set on August 26, 2014.

Preceded by Blues Busters; 1950	'The Bowery Boys' movies 1946-1958	Succeeded by Ghost Chasers; 1951
