= Angels' Alley =

1948 film by William Beaudine

- Lobby card
- Directed by: William Beaudine
- Written by: Edmond Seward; Tim Ryan; Gerald Schnitzer
- Produced by: Jan Grippo
- Starring: Leo Gorcey; Huntz Hall; William Benedict; Gabriel Dell
- Cinematography: Marcel Le Picard
- Edited by: William Austin
- Music by: Edward J. Kay
- Production company: Monogram Pictures
- Distributed by: Monogram Pictures
- Release date: March 28, 1948 (U.S.)
- Running time: 67 minutes
- Country: United States
- Language: English

Angels' Alley is a 1948 comedy film directed by William Beaudine and starring The Bowery Boys. It is the ninth film in the series and the first one without Bobby Jordan.

== Plot ==
Slip's cousin Jimmy is released from prison for good behavior and comes to live with him and his mother. Unfortunately the only job he can get is stealing cars for a local mobster, Tony Locarno. Slip learns about this and sets out to stop Jimmy from ruining his life. He follows Jimmy to a warehouse that Jimmy is robbing and gets knocked unconscious and is caught by the police. Father O'Hanlon steps in and helps Slip from going to jail.

Jimmy is impressed with Slip's actions and vows to go clean. Slip, meanwhile, wants to put Tony behind bars so he and the rest of the boys join Tony's gang and steals cars in an effort to set him up. Slip steals the mayor's car and Sach steals a police car...leading the real police to arrive on the scene in time to catch Tony and the rest of the gang. Slip takes the credit for wrapping it up, and Sach is shocked that Slip is taking credit from him and tells him, "This is the last picture I do with you!"

== Cast ==
=== The Bowery Boys ===
- Leo Gorcey as Terrance Aloysius 'Slip' Mahoney
- Huntz Hall as Horace Debussy 'Sach' Jones
- William Benedict as Whitey
- David Gorcey as Chuck

=== Remaining cast ===
- Gabriel Dell as Ricky Moreno
- Frankie Darro as Jimmy
- Nestor Paiva as Tony 'Piggy' Locarno
- Nelson Leigh as Father O'Hanlon
- Rosemary La Planche as Daisy Harris
- Bennie Bartlett as Harry 'Jag' Harmon
- Buddy Gorman as Andrew T. Miller

== Production ==
Angels' Alley is the only Bowery Boys films in which Gabriel Dell is given a different character name. Louie (Bernard Gorcey) is absent from the film. However, Louie's Sweet Shop is mentioned by 'Sach' at least once in the film.

Angels' Alley is Bennie Bartlett's first Bowery Boys film. It wouldn't be until the next film in the series in which Bartlett would play his usual character of "Butch Williams."

Rosemary LaPlanche, who stars as Daisy, was Miss America 1941 after having been pageant runner-up in 1940.

== Home media ==
Warner Archives released the film on made-to-order DVD in the United States as part of "The Bowery Boys, Volume Three" on October 1, 2013.

Preceded by Bowery Buckaroos; 1947	'The Bowery Boys' movies 1946–1958	Succeeded by Jinx Money; 1948
