= The Feminine Touch (1941 film) =

1941 film by W. S. Van Dyke

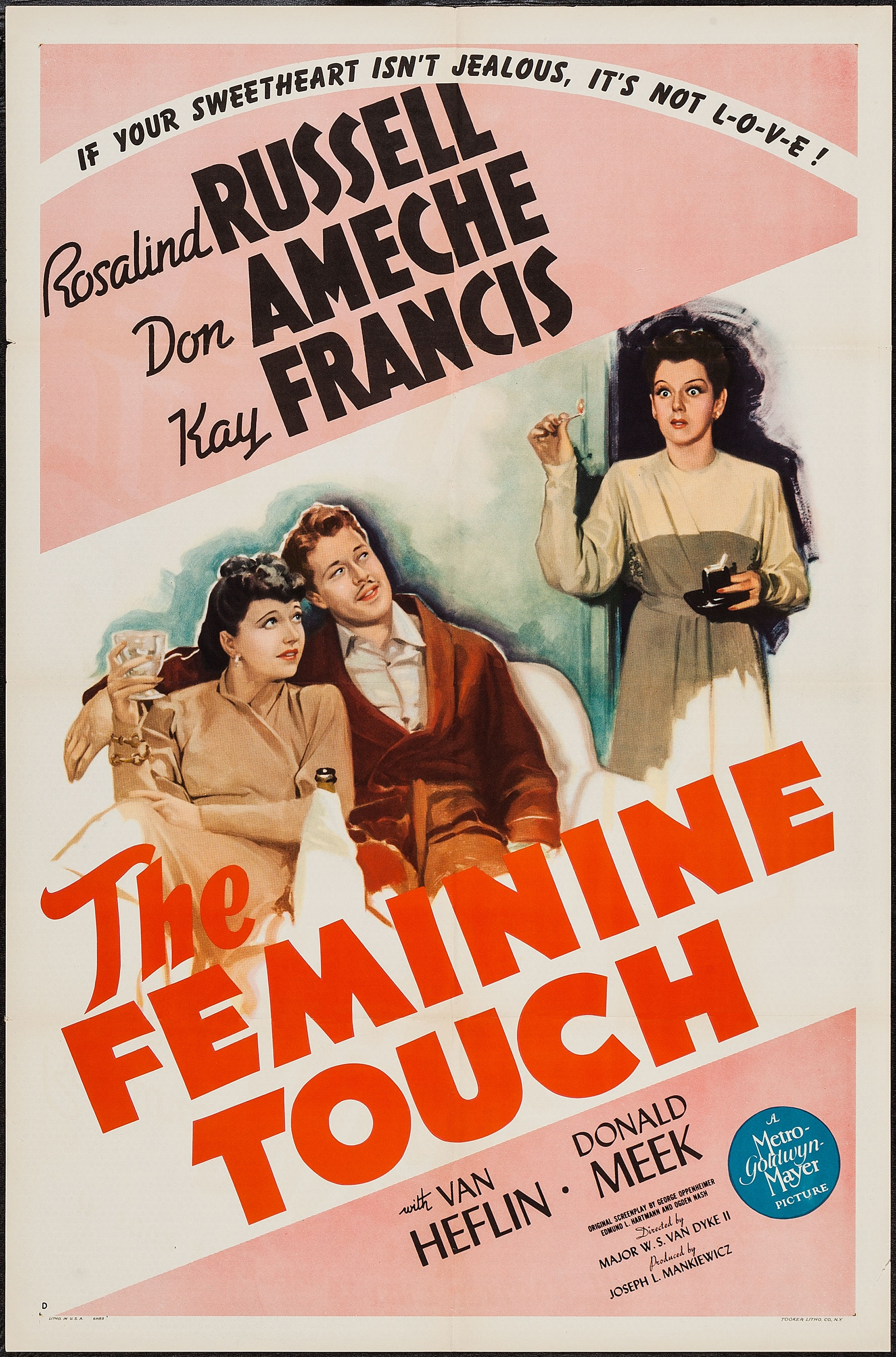
- Film poster
- Directed by: W.S. Van Dyke
- Written by: George Oppenheimer; Edmund L. Hartmann; Ogden Nash
- Produced by: Joseph L. Mankiewicz
- Starring: Rosalind Russell; Don Ameche; Kay Francis
- Cinematography: Ray June
- Edited by: Albert Akst
- Music by: Franz Waxman
- Production company: Metro-Goldwyn-Mayer
- Distributed by: Loew's Inc.
- Release date: October 11, 1941
- Running time: 97 minutes
- Country: United States
- Language: English

The Feminine Touch is a 1941 American romantic comedy film directed by W.S. Van Dyke and starring Rosalind Russell, Don Ameche, Kay Francis and Van Heflin. Produced by Metro-Goldwyn-Mayer it is in the screwball comedy tradition. The film's sets were designed by the art director Cedric Gibbons.

== Plot ==
College professor John Hathaway (Don Ameche) is writing a book about jealousy, and how he doesn't believe in it. He isn't the least bit perturbed, for example, when his lovely wife Julie (Rosalind Russell) is the object of desire in the eyes of the school's football star, Rubber Legs Ryan (Gordon Jones).

John goes to New York to meet with publisher Elliott Morgan (Van Heflin), and meets associate Nellie Woods (Kay Francis), who loves Elliott, but can't get him to commit. Elliott is infatuated with John's wife Julie, but after a while, he realizes that she is faithful to her husband. Julie, though, continues to be irked at John's complete lack of jealousy.

A misunderstanding leads to John being placed under arrest. Elliott's failure to help him or to contact lawyer Freddie Bond, as promised, is maddening to Julie, who wants John to knock his block off. She also catches John and Nellie in an embrace, and turns red with jealous rage, which puzzles John because they were merely celebrating his book sale.

Nellie's threat to quit finally gets Elliott to propose, but one day, John finally explodes and strikes him, which leads to a fight between the two women, too. By the time a total stranger calls his wife "sugar" on the street, John is ready to come up swinging.

== Cast ==
- Rosalind Russell as Julie Hathaway
- Don Ameche as Prof. John Hathaway
- Kay Francis as Nellie Woods
- Van Heflin as Elliott Morgan
- Donald Meek as Capt. Makepeace Liveright
- Gordon Jones as Rubber-Legs Ryan
- Henry Daniell as Shelley Mason
- Sidney Blackmer as Freddie Bond
- Grant Mitchell as Dean Hutchinson
- David Clyde as Brighton
- Julie Gibson as Nightclub singer
- Gino Corrado as Waiter

== Bibliography ==
- Milberg, Doris. The Art of the Screwball Comedy: Madcap Entertainment from the 1930s to Today. McFarland, 2013.
- Sculthorpe, Derek. Van Heflin: A Life in Film. McFarland, 2016.
