= Let's Go Navy! =

1951 film by William Beaudine

- Theatrical poster
- Directed by: William Beaudine
- Written by: Max Adams; Bert Lawrence
- Produced by: Jan Grippo
- Starring: Leo Gorcey; Huntz Hall David Gorcey; William Benedict
- Cinematography: Marcel LePicard
- Edited by: William Austin
- Music by: Edward J. Kay
- Production company: Monogram Pictures
- Distributed by: Monogram Pictures
- Release date: July 29, 1951
- Running time: 68 minutes
- Country: United States
- Language: English

Let's Go Navy! is a 1951 comedy film starring the Bowery Boys, the 23rd film in the series. The film was released on July 29, 1951 by Monogram Pictures.

== Plot ==
A local charity has raised $1,600 and entrusted the boys with it. The boys are robbed of the cash by two men dressed as sailors. Believing them to be real sailors, the boys enlist in the Navy under fake names to find the culprits. They spend a year at sea but cannot locate the thieves. However, Sach wins $2,000 gambling and the boys return to the Bowery. They are robbed by the same two men, but with the assistance of their Navy pal Mervin Longnecker, they capture the crooks. They return to the Navy office to receive their commendations but are mistakenly reenlisted.

== Cast ==
=== The Bowery Boys ===
- Leo Gorcey as Terrance Aloysius "Slip" Mahoney
- Huntz Hall as Horace Debussy "Sach" Jones
- William Benedict as Whitey
- David Gorcey as Chuck
- Buddy Gorman as Butch

=== Remaining cast ===
- Bernard Gorcey as Louie Dumbrowski
- Allen Jenkins as Chief Petty Officer Mervin Longnecker
- Tom Neal as Joe
- Charlita as Princess Papoola
- Richard Benedict as Red
- Paul Harvey as Lieutenant Commander O. Tannen
- Jonathan Hale as Captain
- Emory Parnell as Police Sergeant Mulloy
- Douglas Evans as Lieutenant Smith
- Ray Walker as Lt. Bradley
- Frank Jenks as Shell game sailor

== Production ==
Let's Go Navy! is the final Bowery Boys film to feature Buddy Gorman; beginning with the next film in the series, Bennie Bartlett rejoined the group. It is also the last film produced by Jan Grippo, who left the series after his wife died.

The script was written by Leonard Stern under the pseudonym Max Adams. After cowriting Ma and Pa Kettle Go to Town with Martin Ragaway, Stern wanted write a feature on his own. He adopted the pseudonym because he "wasn't particularly proud of doing a Bowery Boy [film]".

== Home media ==
Warner Archives released the film on made-to-order DVD in the United States as part of The Bowery Boys, Volume Two on April 9, 2013.

Preceded by Ghost Chasers; 1951	'The Bowery Boys' movies 1946-1958	Succeeded by Crazy Over Horses; 1951
