= Reckless Age =

- Theatrical release poster
- Directed by: Felix E. Feist
- Screenplay by: Gertrude Purcell; Henry Blankfort
- Story by: Al Martin
- Produced by: Felix E. Feist
- Starring: Gloria Jean; Henry Stephenson; Kathleen Howard; Franklin Pangborn; Andrew Tombes; Marshall Thompson; Jane Darwell; Lloyd Corrigan; Judy Clark; Jack Gilford
- Cinematography: Jerome Ash
- Edited by: Ray Curtiss
- Production company: Universal Pictures
- Distributed by: Universal Pictures
- Release date: November 17, 1944
- Running time: 63 minutes
- Country: United States
- Language: English

Reckless Age is a 1944 American comedy film directed by Felix E. Feist and written by Gertrude Purcell and Henry Blankfort. The film stars Gloria Jean, Henry Stephenson, Kathleen Howard, Franklin Pangborn, Andrew Tombes, Marshall Thompson, Jane Darwell, Lloyd Corrigan, Judy Clark and Jack Gilford. The film was released on November 17, 1944, by Universal Pictures.

== Plot ==
Linda Wadsworth (Gloria Jean) rebels against her millionaire grandfather, J. H. Wadsworth (Henry Stephenson), and runs away from home. Unknown to Mr. Wadsworth, she gets a job at one of his many five-and-ten-cent stores as a clerk.

== Cast ==
- Gloria Jean as Linda Wadsworth
- Henry Stephenson as J. H. Wadsworth
- Kathleen Howard as Sarah Wadsworth
- Franklin Pangborn as Mr. Thurtle
- Andrew Tombes as Mr. Cook
- Marshall Thompson as Roy Connors
- Jane Darwell as Mrs. Connors
- Lloyd Corrigan as Mr. Connors
- Judy Clark as Sandra Sibelius
- Jack Gilford as Joey Bagle
- Chester Clute as Jerkins
- The Delta Rhythm Boys as Themselves
- Harold Nicholas as Dancer
- Eula Morgan as Guard
