= Smuggler's Cove (film) =

1948 film by William Beaudine

- Directed by: William Beaudine
- Written by: Tim Ryan; Edmond Seward
- Based on: Smuggler's Cove; 1933 serial in Blue Book Magazine by Talbert Josselyn
- Produced by: Jan Grippo
- Starring: Leo Gorcey; Huntz Hall; Gabriel Dell; David Gorcey
- Cinematography: Marcel Le Picard
- Edited by: William Austin
- Music by: Edward J. Kay
- Distributed by: Monogram Pictures
- Release date: October 10, 1948
- Running time: 66 minutes
- Country: United States
- Language: English

Smuggler's Cove is a 1948 American comedy film directed by William Beaudine and starring The Bowery Boys. The film was released on October 10, 1948 by Monogram Pictures and is the eleventh film in the series.

== Plot ==
Young amateur sleuth Terence "Slip" Mahoney works cleaning offices in a New York highrise building when he comes across a letter addressed to Terence Mahoney, Esquire. Believing the letter is meant for him, he opens and reads it. The letter tells of an inheritance waiting for him. A wealthy uncle, living in a large house on Long Island, has left him a fortune. He is expected at Mahoney Manor, immediately.

Slip is not aware that the "real" Terence Mahoney, heir to Mahoney Manor, and his young daughter Teresa, are waiting to receive the letter. Slip brings his friends from the gang and goes to the Manor to receive the inheritance.

Upon his arrival to the Manor, Slip hears a shot ring out. Slip does not let this scare him, and enters the house and meets the person taking care of the property, Digger. It turns out Digger is really a goon representing a smuggler, Count Boris Petrov, and that he is running the illegal business from the Manor.

Although Digger is welcoming when the boys enter the manor, Petrov sets out to scare them off the property, since they are interfering with his business. The boys are not so easily discouraged, and the next day they find a secret passageway in the fireplace. As they enter the hidden room behind the door, Petrov locks it from the outside, trapping the boys in the basement.

The other Terence Mahoney arrives at the manor with his daughter, tired of waiting for the letter. They settle in at the house and Petrov goes on to try to scare them away in the same way he tried with the boys.

In search of Slip and his gang, a reporter called Gabe arrives at the manor, finding the other Terence Mahoney in his bed at night. Gabe also sees flash lights across the bay sending morse code signals, and his suspicions are raised as to what business Digger is running. He watches as Digger escorts a woman and a captain ashore up to the manor.

Gabe sees the woman give Petrov a huge diamond and hears one of the boys call from the basement. He sets the gang free and reveals what he has discovered to them, that there is a smuggling operation going on at the manor and that he suspects Mahoney of being the smuggler boss.

The gang confronts Mahoney but finds out he is the rightful heir to the manor. Instead the gang, with the help of Gabe, sets out to catch the real criminals and ultimately take back the diamond. Mahoney feels that country living is far too exhausting for his taste and leaves the manor to Slip.

== Cast ==
=== The Bowery Boys ===
- Leo Gorcey as Terrance Aloysius 'Slip' Mahoney
- Huntz Hall as Horace Debussy 'Sach' Jones
- William Benedict as Whitey
- David Gorcey as Chuck
- Bennie Bartlett as Butch

=== Remaining cast ===
- Gabriel Dell as Gabe
- Eddie Gribbon as Digger
- Martin Kosleck as Count Boris Petrov
- Paul Harvey as Terrence Mahoney, Esq.
- Amelita Ward as Teresa Mahoney
- Buddy Gorman as the messenger

== Production ==
The film is based upon the story Smuggler's Cove by Talbert Josselyn, which first appeared in Bluebook Magazine and was filmed between March 1948 and April 1948.

Louie (Bernard Gorcey) is absent from this film, but is mentioned a couple of times by 'Sach'.

== Home media ==
Warner Archives released the film on made-to-order DVD in the United States as part of "The Bowery Boys, Volume Two" on April 9, 2013.

Preceded by Jinx Money; 1948	'The Bowery Boys' movies 1946-1958	Succeeded by Trouble Makers; 1948
