= Fools for Scandal =

1938 film by Mervyn LeRoy

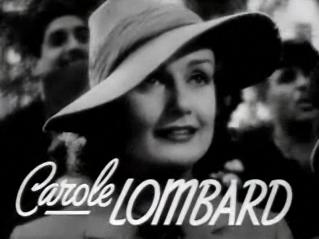
- trailer featuring Carole Lombard
- Directed by: Mervyn LeRoy; Bobby Connolly ("Le Petit Harlem" sequence)
- Screenplay by: Herbert Fields; Joseph Fields; Irving Brecher (add'l dialogue); Uncredited: Julius J. Epstein; Philip G. Epstein; Edith Fitzgerald; Robert Rossen
- Based on: Return Engagement (unproduced 1936 play) by Nancy Hamilton; James Shute; Rosemary Casey
- Produced by: Mervyn LeRoy
- Starring: Carole Lombard; Fernand Gravet
- Cinematography: Ted Tetzlaff
- Edited by: William Holmes
- Music by: Songs: Richard Rodgers (music); Lorenz Hart (lyrics)
- Production company: Warner Bros. Pictures
- Distributed by: Warner Bros. Pictures
- Release date: April 16, 1938 (U.S.)
- Running time: 80 minutes
- Country: United States
- Language: English
- Budget: $1.3 million

Fools for Scandal is a 1938 American screwball comedy film directed and produced by Mervyn LeRoy and starring Carole Lombard and Fernand Gravet, featuring Ralph Bellamy, Allen Jenkins, Isabel Jeans, Marie Wilson and Marcia Ralston. It was written by Herbert Fields and Joseph Fields with additional dialogue by Irving Brecher, and uncredited contributions by others based on the unproduced 1936 play Return Engagement by Nancy Hamilton, James Shute and Rosemary Casey. The songs are by Richard Rodgers and Lorenz Hart.

Fools for Scandal is now best remembered as one of Lombard's worst films and one that set her on the course for seeking dramatic roles for the next few years.

== Plot ==
Film star Kay Winters is traveling through Paris under a wig and the pseudonym of Kay Summers with her maid and companion Myrtle. She meets Rene, a French marquis who has lost all his money and has pawned all his material possessions to live, something Paris society does not know. He sees her on the street in Montmartre and offers to give her a tour of the real Paris. Kay, who already had plans to attend dinner with Lady Paula Malverton, tries to brush him off, only to become charmed by the persistent and impetuous Rene. Once finished with the tour, they have dinner, and unexpectedly run into Lady Malverton and her party. Lady Malverton calls Rene over to her table. When he returns, he discovers that Kay has left. However, she left a note asking him to lunch with her the following day.

Kay returns to her hotel, to see Phillip Chester waiting for her, the man who is in love with her. The next day, Kay is waiting by the fountain and Rene discovers that he has overslept. His friend, Dewey Gilson, has taken too long getting Rene's suit from the pawn shop. Rene waits, helplessly, as Kay prepares to leave. However, he runs down and obtains two carpets from a salesman, wrapping them around himself as a form of wealthy robe. He alerts Kay that he will be ready to have lunch in just a while, but two women, who believe that he is selling the carpets, demand to buy them. In an argument about who can buy the carpets between the women and Kay, the carpets are pulled from Rene and he runs away in his underwear.

Later, Rene discovers that Kay is actually a movie star. Before he can contact her, however, she leaves for London. Rene follows her. He comes to her house at a party in which Kay has ordered her guests to appear in animal masks. Upon seeing Rene, she invites him to dinner, where Lady Malverton tells him to demonstrate his skills as a chef. After tasting the food that Rene prepares, Kay, as a joke, offers him a job as her cook. Rene, delighted, accepts without Kay knowing. Meanwhile, Phillip begs Kay to marry him, but she again postpones her answer.

Lady Malverton finds Rene in the kitchen, where he tells her that he has taken the job of being Kay's chef. Lady Malverton spreads the gossip. The following morning, Kay is delivered breakfast by Rene and begs him to leave. Rene tells her he has no such intention and answers the phone several times and tells everyone he is Kay's chef. Lady Malverton arrives with a swarm of gossips and demands to know the truth. Kay tells them that she has hired him as a chef. Nonetheless, the tabloids are already running reports that Rene is Kay's "love chef".

Kay, undaunted, accepts Phillip's proposal of marriage and orders an engagement dinner. Rene does his best to spoil the dinner and succeeds, with Phillip walking out of the house after a quarrel with Kay. Rene finally gets Kay to admit she loves him, but she tells him that she will not marry him, as the difference in social status between them will earn her the derision of everyone she knows. Rene tells her that he is a French marquis and leaves, angered by her silly fears. Kay follows him into an opera house where they kiss before an unexpected audience.

== Cast ==
- Carole Lombard as Kay Winters
- Fernand Gravet as Rene Vilardell
- Ralph Bellamy as Philip Chester
- Allen Jenkins as Dewey Gilson
- Isabel Jeans as Lady Paula Malverton
- Marie Wilson as Myrtle
- Marcia Ralston as Jill
- Tola Nesmith as Agnes
- Heather Thatcher as Lady Potter-Porter
- Jacques Lory as Papa Joli-Coeur
- Tempie Piggott as Bessie

Cast notes: Fools for Scandal featured a cameo by Lombard's Pekingese, and it was the third pairing of Lombard and Bellamy.

== Production ==
The working title of the film, which was planned to be filmed in Technicolor, was "Food for Scandal"; both titles were inspired by Sheridan's play The School for Scandal. The day of its release, April 16, 1938, Sheridan's play was feature on NBC Blue's program Great Plays.

This was Lombard's only film for Warner Bros. Pictures, and Mervyn LeRoy's last; he then went to MGM.

Fernand Gravet came to Warners after having achieved considerable success in French films under the name Fernand Gravey, but the failure of Fools for Scandal prevented him from achieving star status in the United States. He made one other film in the U.S., The Great Waltz for MGM, then returned to France.

Warners borrowed Ted Tetzlaff, Lombard's favorite cinematographer, from Paramount Pictures for the film, so that Lombard would be comfortable with how she was shot. She later said that she knew Fools for Scandal was a flop "when my friends confined their comments to how beautifully I had been photographed". Unfortunately, she never worked with Tetzlaff again.

== Reception ==
Fools for Scandal was an enormous box-office failure. Although Lombard considered The Gay Bride her worst film, many contemporary fans give Fools for Scandal that distinction. Lombard lacked chemistry with Gravet, and audiences, who had already begun tiring of screwball comedies, noted a similarity between the plots of Fools for Scandal and Lombard's previous screwball film My Man Godfrey.

Fools's failure prompted Lombard to pursue only dramatic roles for the next few years until she joined Alfred Hitchcock and Robert Montgomery for 1941's Mr. & Mrs. Smith.
