= Jack Norman =

Australian rules footballer (1909–1994)

Personal information
- Full name: John Norman
- Born: 2 August 1909; Newport, Wales
- Died: 23 March 1994 (aged 84)
- Original team: Brunswick
- Height: 188 cm (6 ft 2 in)
- Weight: 89 kg (196 lb)

Playing career^{1}
Years	Club	Games (Goals)
1938	Fitzroy	1 (1)
1940–41, 45–46	Preston (VFA)	52 (24)
- ^{1} Playing statistics correct to the end of 1938.

John Norman (2 August 1909 – 23 March 1994) was an Australian rules footballer who played with Fitzroy in the Victorian Football League (VFL).

== Family ==
The eldest son of Norwegian-born Jonas Mattias Elija Svehaug (1886–1968) and Sarah Ann Curran (1886–1968), John Svehaug was born in Newport, Wales (the city of his mother's birth) on 2 August 1909. The family took the anglicised surname Norman when they emigrated to Australia in 1914.

He married Stella May Sullivan in 1931.

== Football ==
After a single senior game in three years with Fitzroy, Norman transferred to Preston during the 1939 season where he played either side of his period of service in the Royal Australian Air Force during World War II.
