= Paul Bryar =

American actor (1910–1985)

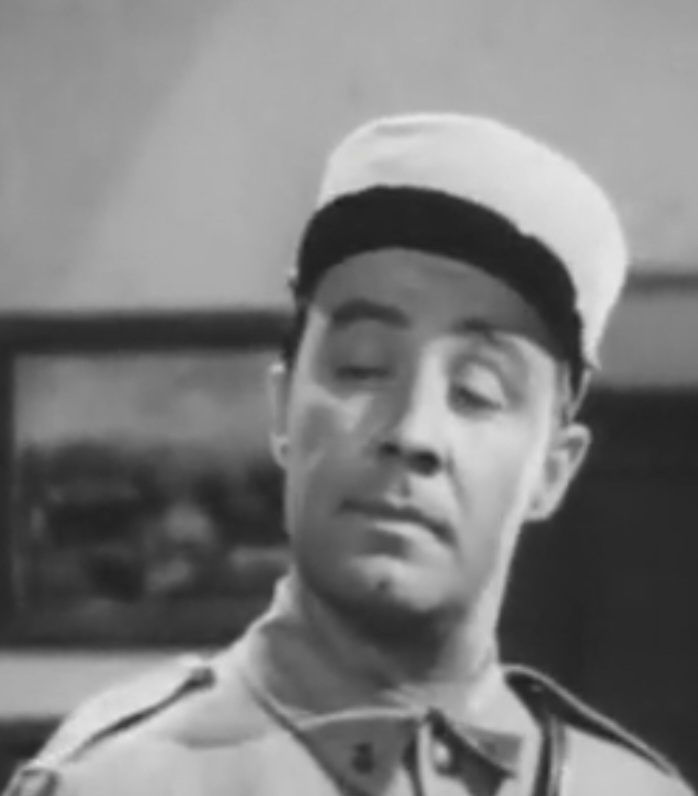
- Bryar in Jungle Siren (1942)
- Born: Gabriel Paul Barrere; February 21, 1910; Manhattan, New York, U.S.
- Died: August 30, 1985 (aged 75); Van Nuys, California, U.S.
- Occupation: Actor
- Years active: 1938–1983
- Spouse: Claudia Bryar (m. 1940-1985 His death)
- Children: 3

Paul Bryar (born Gabriel Paul Barrere; February 21, 1910 – August 30, 1985) was an American actor. In a career spanning nearly half a century, he appeared in numerous films and television series.

== Career ==
Bryar appeared in nearly 220 films between 1938 and 1983, although most of his roles were small in size. He made his film debut in the Harold Lloyd comedy Professor Beware. Some B-movies during the 1940s and 1950s like Jungle Siren, Lady from Chungking, Parole, Inc. and The Bob Mathias Story gave him the chance to play substantial supporting roles.

Bryar appeared in three movies directed by Alfred Hitchcock, including Vertigo (1958), where he had an uncredited role as the friendly Police Captain who accompanies James Stewart to the coroner's inquest. The other Hitchcock films were Notorious (1946) and The Wrong Man (1956). He also appeared in a 1955 episode of Alfred Hitchcock Presents. Byrar was typecast as a policeman in numerous other films, including Rebel Without a Cause (1955) and some Bowery Boys films. Bryar also played bartenders, district attorneys, sheriffs, photographers and guards. He appeared in Charles Laughton's film classic The Night of the Hunter (1955) as a hangman and family father who feels depressed about his work. Bryar also played Card Player #1 who quits the game before the main card player, Macon (Donnelly Rhodes), threatens the Sundance Kid (Robert Redford) in the opening scene of Butch Cassidy and the Sundance Kid (1969). Many have mistakenly assumed that it was Bryar's character who threatened the Sundance Kid.

From the 1950s until the early 1980s, Bryar appeared in about 150 television shows. He was seen in The Twilight Zone, Bonanza, Batman, Little House on the Prairie, Emergency!, Bewitched, The Andy Griffith Show, The Beverly Hillbillies, Leave It to Beaver; Kung Fu and Hart to Hart. Paul Bryar also appeared in the first season of Barnaby Jones; episode titled, "To Denise, with Love and Murder"(04/22/1973). He had a recurring role as Sheriff Harve Anders in the short-lived series The Long, Hot Summer between 1965 and 1966. His last role was a small part in the film Heart Like a Wheel, two years before his death.

== Personal life ==
Bryar married actress Claudia Bryar on February 3, 1940, in Guymon, Oklahoma. They remained wed until his death in 1985. They had three children, including Paul Barrere, guitarist and singer with the rock band Little Feat.

== Selected filmography ==
- Professor Beware (1938) as Harry - Radio Patrolman (uncredited)
- Tenth Avenue Kid (1938) as Wheeler
- Artists and Models Abroad (1938) as Hotel Clerk (uncredited)
- Midnight (1939) as Porter (uncredited)
- Waterfront (1939) as Committeeman (uncredited)
- Rio (1939) as Guard (uncredited)
- The Roaring Twenties (1939) as Gangster (uncredited)
- Hold That Woman! (1940) as 'Duke' Jurgens
- Marked Men (1940) as Joe Mellon
- Arise, My Love (1940) as Desk Clerk (uncredited)
- You're Out of Luck (1941) as Benny, the Henchman-Driver
- The Man Who Lost Himself (1941) as Bar Waiter (uncredited)
- The Gang's All Here (1941) as Bob (uncredited)
- Desperate Cargo (1941) as Henchman Desser
- Badlands of Dakota (1941) as Barfly (uncredited)
- The Miracle Kid (1941) as Rocco
- Paris Calling (1941) as Paul
- Sealed Lips (1942) as Henchman Spike (uncredited)
- Don Winslow of the Navy (1942, Serial) as Kramer - [Chs. 3-4]
- Man from Headquarters (1942) as Knuckles
- Duke of the Navy (1942) as Bunco Bisbee
- The Strange Case of Doctor Rx (1942) as Bailiff (uncredited)
- Junior G-Men of the Air (1942, Serial) as Chemist [Ch. 5] (uncredited)
- Spy Smasher (1942, Serial) as Lawlor
- Mississippi Gambler (1942) as Evans (uncredited)
- The Mystery of Marie Roget (1942) as Detective (uncredited)
- Eagle Squadron (1942) as Frenchman (uncredited)
- Invisible Agent (1942) as German Soldier (uncredited)
- Jungle Siren (1942) as Sergeant Mike Jenkins
- Sin Town (1942) as Grady (uncredited)
- Eyes of the Underworld (1942) as Taylor (uncredited)
- Foreign Agent (1942) as Jerry the bartender
- Destination Unknown (1942) as German Henchman (uncredited)
- Criminal Investigator (1942) as Stuart
- Queen of Broadway (1942) as Rosy
- Lady from Chungking (1942) as Pat O'Roulke
- Sherlock Holmes and the Secret Weapon (1942) as Swiss Waiter (uncredited)
- The Adventures of Smilin' Jack (1943, Serial) as Herr Bauer - German Spy [Chs. 6-7] (uncredited)
- Silent Witness (1943) as Blackie
- The Crystal Ball (1943) as Maurice, Captain of Waiters (uncredited)
- Don Winslow of the Coast Guard (1943) as Water Gate Controller (uncredited)
- Sarong Girl (1943) as Jake
- Crime Doctor (1943) as First Reporter in Court (uncredited)
- Corvette K-225 (1943) as Stoker (uncredited)
- Flesh and Fantasy (1943) as Harlequin (uncredited)
- The Desert Song (1943) as French Captain (uncredited)
- Lost City of the Jungle (1946, Serial) as Casino Bartender [Chs. 1-2, 5, 10, 12] (uncredited)
- Larceny in Her Heart (1946) as Tim Rourke
- Blonde for a Day (1946) as Tim Rourke
- Shadows Over Chinatown (1946) as Mike Rogan
- Notorious (1946) as Photographer (uncredited)
- Gas House Kids (1946) as Shadow Sarecki
- The Razor's Edge (1946) as Frenchman (uncredited)
- Lady Chaser (1946) as Garry
- Swell Guy (1946) as Companion (uncredited)
- The Return of Monte Cristo (1946) (uncredited)
- Blind Spot (1947) as Police Officer Harmon (uncredited)
- The Beginning or the End (1947) as Army Officer (uncredited)
- Three on a Ticket (1947) as Tim Rourke
- The Millerson Case (1947) as Harley Rumford (uncredited)
- The Corpse Came C.O.D. (1947) as Reporter (uncredited)
- Brute Force (1947) as Harry (uncredited)
- Robin Hood of Texas (1947) as Ace
- Ride the Pink Horse (1947) as Policeman (uncredited)
- Killer McCoy (1947) as Joe - Welsh's Bodyguard (uncredited)
- The Chinese Ring (1947) as Police Sergeant (uncredited)
- The Judge Steps Out (1948) as Dining Truck Driver (uncredited)
- Joe Palooka in Fighting Mad (1948) as Detective Lieutenant
- Campus Sleuth (1948) as Houser
- To the Victor (1948) as Detective on Train (uncredited)
- Smart Woman (1948) as Joe the Bartender (uncredited)
- I Wouldn't Be in Your Shoes (1948) as Guard #2
- The Dude Goes West (1948) as Smith (uncredited)
- The Babe Ruth Story (1948) as Sam (scenes deleted)
- Walk a Crooked Mile (1948) as Ivan (uncredited)
- Rogues' Regiment (1948) as Saigon Chief of Police (uncredited)
- Bungalow 13 (1948) as Police Officer (uncredited)
- Parole, Inc. (1948) as Charley Newton
- Alaska Patrol (1949) as Commander Braddock
- Dynamite (1949) as Christmas Party Guest (uncredited)
- Shockproof (1949) as Man in Car (uncredited)
- Flaxy Martin (1949) as Policeman with Witness (uncredited)
- Bad Boy (1949) as Gambler (uncredited)
- Mississippi Rhythm (1949) as Sad Sam Beale
- Follow Me Quietly (1949) as Police Sergeant Bryce (uncredited)
- Barbary Pirate (1949) as First Mate (uncredited)
- Madame Bovary (1949) as Bailiff (uncredited)
- Prison Warden (1949) as Convict (uncredited)
- The Story of Molly X (1949) as Mr. Lang (uncredited)
- Mary Ryan, Detective (1949) as Chuck (uncredited)
- Chicago Deadline (1949) as Bartender (uncredited)
- Bride for Sale (1949) as Barrows (uncredited)
- The Great Lover (1949) as French Waiter (uncredited)
- When Willie Comes Marching Home (1950) as French Resistance Fighter (uncredited)
- Under My Skin (1950) as Max (uncredited)
- Square Dance Katy (1950) as Taxi Driver
- Armored Car Robbery (1950) as Car 6 Patrolman at Pier 5 (uncredited)
- The Underworld Story (1950) as Helen's Father (uncredited)
- Triple Trouble (1950) as Prison Policeman Wilson (uncredited)
- The Petty Girl (1950) as Policeman #3 (uncredited)
- The Toast of New Orleans (1950) as Minor Role (uncredited)
- The Fuller Brush Girl (1950) as Husband Watching TV (uncredited)
- Blues Busters (1950) as Bimbo
- The Sun Sets at Dawn (1950) as Truck Driver (uncredited)
- Joe Palooka in the Squared Circle (1950) as Detective Lieutenant Roderick
- Southside 1-1000 (1950) as Jack, FBI Man Cab Driver
- Call of the Klondike (1950) as Fred Foley
- Sierra Passage (1950) as Bartender (uncredited)
- Navy Bound (1951) as C.P.O. Robert Garrells
- Valentino (1951) as Photographer (uncredited)
- Ghost Chasers (1951) as Reporter (uncredited)
- Cavalry Scout (1951) as Bartender (uncredited)
- According to Mrs. Hoyle (1951) as Willie
- Never Trust a Gambler (1951) as Undersheriff's Assistant (uncredited)
- Let's Go Navy! (1951) as Policeman at Desk (uncredited)
- The People Against O'Hara (1951) as Detective Howie Pendleton (uncredited)
- The Mob (1951) as Policeman Cullen (uncredited)
- You Never Can Tell (1951) as Prisoner (uncredited)
- Leave It to the Marines (1951) as Corporal Pappodopoli
- Sky High (1951) as Sergeant Kurt Petrov
- Callaway Went Thataway (1951) as Gaffer (uncredited)
- Death of a Salesman (1951) as Subway Guard (uncredited)
- Aladdin and His Lamp (1952) as Nervous Man (uncredited)
- Hold That Line (1952) as Coach Rowland
- Sound Off (1952) as George - Headwaiter (uncredited)
- Lydia Bailey (1952) as Guard (uncredited)
- Glory Alley (1952) as Cab Driver (uncredited)
- Has Anybody Seen My Gal (1952) as Doorman at Poker Game (uncredited)
- What Price Glory (1952) as Charmaine's Uncle (uncredited)
- The Rose Bowl Story (1952) as Assistant Coach Martin (uncredited)
- Arctic Flight (1952) as Happy Hogan
- Because of You (1952) as First Man (uncredited)
- Torpedo Alley (1952) as Bartender (uncredited)
- Treasure of the Golden Condor (1953) as Guard (uncredited)
- The Story of Three Loves (1953) as River Policeman (segment "Equilibrium") (uncredited)
- White Lightning (1953) as Stew Barton
- She's Back on Broadway (1953) as Ned Colby (uncredited)
- Man in the Dark (1953) as Freddie - Bartender (uncredited)
- Roar of the Crowd (1953) as Max Bromski
- South Sea Woman (1953) as Captain of Gendarmes (uncredited)
- Dangerous When Wet (1953) as Pierre
- Vice Squad (1953) as Lieutenant Cade (uncredited)
- Clipped Wings (1953) as Air Police Sergeant (uncredited)
- 99 River Street (1953) as River Street Bartender (uncredited)
- All American (1953) as Taxi Driver (uncredited)
- Hot News (1953) as Doc Allen
- Easy to Love (1953) as Mr. Barnes
- Executive Suite (1954) as Stork Club Waiter (uncredited)
- Tennessee Champ (1954) as Ring Announcer (uncredited)
- The Bowery Boys Meet the Monsters (1954) as Police Officer Martin (uncredited)
- The Far Country (1954) as Sheriff Walters (uncredited)
- Brigadoon (1954) as Waiter (uncredited)
- Rogue Cop (1954) as Patrolman Marx (uncredited)
- A Star Is Born (1954) as Bartender at Racetrack (uncredited)
- The Bob Mathias Story (1954) as Bill Andrews
- The Yellow Mountain (1954) as Miner (uncredited)
- Alfred Hitchcock Presents (1955) (Season 1 Episode 6: "Salvage") as Lou Henry
- The Prodigal (1955) as Townsman (uncredited)
- Seven Angry Men (1955) as Train Fireman (uncredited)
- Interrupted Melody (1955) as Florida Conductor (uncredited)
- Mad at the World (1955) as Matt, Police Detective
- The Night of the Hunter (1955) as Bart the Hangman (uncredited)
- No Man's Woman (1955) as Sandy (the bartender)
- It's Always Fair Weather (1955) as Carl - Maitre d' (uncredited)
- Rebel Without a Cause (1955) as Desk Sergeant #2 (uncredited)
- Hell on Frisco Bay (1955) as Hotel Doorman (uncredited)
- Inside Detroit (1956) as Sam Foran
- The Killer Is Loose (1956) as Greg Boyd
- Crime in the Streets (1956) as Mr. Daniels - Lenny's Father (uncredited)
- Lust for Life (1956) as Inspector (uncredited)
- Tea and Sympathy (1956) as Alex (uncredited)
- Rumble on the Docks (1956) as Police Captain Callahan (uncredited)
- Stagecoach to Fury (1956) (uncredited)
- The Wrong Man (1956) as Interrogation Officer (uncredited)
- The Quiet Gun (1957) as Silva (uncredited)
- Chain of Evidence (1957) as Jenkins (uncredited)
- Mister Cory (1957) as Charlie - Dealer (uncredited)
- The Big Land (1957) as First Bartender (uncredited)
- The Shadow on the Window (1957) as Bartender (uncredited)
- Silk Stockings (1957) as Reporter (uncredited)
- Teenage Doll (1957) as Helen's Father
- The Joker Is Wild (1957) as Heckler (uncredited)
- The Helen Morgan Story (1957) as Bartender (uncredited)
- Looking for Danger (1957) as Major Harper
- Young and Dangerous (1957) as Desk Sergeant (uncredited)
- Don't Go Near the Water (1957) as Lieutenant Commander Flaherty (uncredited)
- Teenage Thunder (1957) as Bert Morrison
- Too Much, Too Soon (1958) as Bill (uncredited)
- Vertigo (1958) as Captain Hansen (uncredited)
- Gunman's Walk (1958) as Bartender (uncredited)
- The Naked and the Dead (1958) as General (uncredited)
- Al Capone (1959) as Police Inspector (uncredited)
- The Rabbit Trap (1959) as Bus Driver (uncredited)
- It Started with a Kiss (1959) as Majordomo (uncredited)
- The Wreck of the Mary Deare (1959) as Port Official (uncredited)
- Vice Raid (1959) as Internal Affairs Hearing Officer (uncredited)
- Ocean's 11 (1960) as Cop (uncredited)
- Leave It to Beaver (1960) as Sargeant Petersen
- Squad Car (1960) as Police Lieutenant Beck
- Cimarron (1960) as Mr. Self - Politician (uncredited)
- The Big Bankroll (1961) as Police Detective (uncredited)
- Saintly Sinners (1962) as Duke
- All Fall Down (1962) as Manager of Sweet Shop (scenes deleted)
- How the West Was Won (1962) as Auctioneer's Assistant (uncredited)
- Man's Favorite Sport? (1964) as Bartender at Rotating Bar (uncredited)
- The Quick Gun (1964) as Mitchell
- Sex and the Single Girl (1964) as Toll Gate Guard (uncredited)
- The Great Race (1965) as Policeman (uncredited)
- A Very Special Favor (1965) as Mac - Hotel Doorman (uncredited)
- The Third Day (1965) as Pete - Bartender (uncredited)
- Made in Paris (1966) as Attendant (uncredited)
- The Long, Hot Summer (1965-1966, TV series, recurring role) as Sheriff Harve Anders
- The Reluctant Astronaut (1967) as First Bus Driver (uncredited)
- P.J. (1968) as Gatekeeper (uncredited)
- The Shakiest Gun in the West (1968) as Man at Bar (uncredited)
- Butch Cassidy and the Sundance Kid (1969) as Card Player #1
- My Dog, the Thief (1969) as The Motorcycle Cop
- The Spectre of Edgar Allan Poe (1974) as Thomas W. White
- Funny Lady (1975) as Cleaning Man
- Dawn: Portrait of a Teenage Runaway (1976, TV Movie) as Counterman
- A Change of Seasons (1980) as Man at Table
- Modern Romance (1981) as Man in Phone Booth (uncredited)
- Heart Like a Wheel (1983) as Matt, Card Player (final film role)
