= Benny Bartlett =

American actor (1924–1999)

- Benny Bartlett 1938
- Born: August 16, 1924; Independence, Kansas, U.S.
- Died: December 26, 1999 (aged 75); Redding, California, U.S.
- Other name: Bennie Bartlett
- Occupation: Actor
- Years active: 1935–1956

Floyd B. Bartlett, known professionally as Benny Bartlett or Bennie Bartlett (August 16, 1924 – December 26, 1999), was an American child actor, musician, and later a member of the long-running feature film series The Bowery Boys.

== Biography ==
=== Career ===
Benny Bartlett's first stage role was when he was ten days old. He became a musical prodigy, playing the trumpet at age four, directing and singing with his own dance orchestra on radio. He made his debut in motion pictures in 1935, appearing in the RKO musical Millions in the Air (1935), in which he had a piano specialty. The next year he appeared in a short for Paramount, singing "An Old-Fashioned Mill," which he had composed at the age of nine. The studio signed him to a contract soon afterward. Paramount had plans for Bartlett: syndicated columnist Mollie Merrick reported that the "eight-year-old" Bartlett (he was really 11) would star in the title role of Tom Sawyer, Detective opposite co-star Elizabeth Patterson. The project was shelved—perhaps because Paramount had already fudged Bartlett's age—and the film was ultimately made with Billy Cook as Sawyer and new find Donald O'Connor as Huckleberry Finn. Bartlett began appearing with many of Paramount's biggest stars, and became such a hot property that he was often loaned out to other studios. Columbia featured him in an Andy Clyde short, Swing, You Swingers! (1938), in which he played an adolescent bandleader; he received billing as "Benny Bartlett and His Band."

=== Later career ===
By the early 1940s, Bartlett had outgrown child roles and was playing incidental parts in feature films like Thank Your Lucky Stars (1943, as a theater call boy). He was also working in Monogram's East Side Kids comedies.

Bartlett joined the military during World War II. After his enlistment was over, he resumed his acting career at PRC, where he co-starred in the Gas House Kids comedies, an imitation of The Bowery Boys with Our Gang alumni Carl "Alfalfa" Switzer and Tommy Bond. Bartlett was billed second and was quite prominent in the Gas House Kids vehicles; he played his trumpet in Gas House Kids Go West (1947). He might have continued there indefinitely, but the PRC studio was absorbed by a larger company and the series was discontinued. William Beaudine, who had directed Bartlett in Gas House Kids Go West, remembered Bartlett's comic skills and recruited him for the Bowery Boys. He was usually billed as "Bennie Bartlett" (and once, erroneously, as "David Bartlett," mistaken for co-star David Gorcey).

Bartlett left the series in 1949 and was replaced by Buddy Gorman, a utility player in the East Side Kids/Bowery Boys franchises. When Gorman left the series to get married in 1951, Bartlett returned. He remained with the series until 1955, but with his participation and dialogue sharply curtailed. Leo Gorcey even addressed him facetiously on screen as "No Lines" and "Blabbermouth," and in one film (Paris Playboys) he had no dialogue at all. Bartlett did try to break away from the series (he has a bit in the 1954 Alfred Hitchcock thriller Rear Window, and he accepted small roles on television). He may have stayed with the Bowery Boys as a favor to director Edward Bernds, or perhaps Bartlett's contract simply ran out; in any event, when Bernds left the series after Dig That Uranium, so did Bennie Bartlett.

He gave up his acting career in 1958 and became a professional realtor, reverting to his given name of Floyd B. Bartlett.

== Selected filmography ==
- Millions in the Air (1935) - Kid Pianist
- Timothy's Quest (1936) - Jimmy
- The Sky Parade (1936) - Jimmie Allen - Age 9 (uncredited)
- Thirteen Hours by Air (1936) - Waldemar Pitt III
- The Princess Comes Across (1936) - Ship's Bellhop (uncredited)
- Poppy (1936) - Boy (uncredited)
- The Texas Rangers (1936) - David
- Three Married Men (1936) - Percy Mullins
- Time Out for Romance (1937) - Orville Healy
- Maid of Salem (1937) - Timothy - Her Son
- Let Them Live (1937) - Mike
- Easy Living (1937) - Newsboy (uncredited)
- Exclusive (1937) - Boy (uncredited)
- Danger – Love at Work (1937) - Junior Pemberton
- Bulldog Drummond's Revenge (1937) - Cabin Boy
- Penrod and His Twin Brother (1938) - Chuck
- Sons of the Legion (1938) - Red O'Flaherty
- Gang Bullets (1938) - Billy Jones
- Just Around the Corner (1938) - Milton Ramsby
- The Great Man Votes (1939) - Davy McCarthy
- The Family Next Door (1939) - Rufus Pierce
- Mickey the Kid (1939) - Joe Fisher
- Honeymoon in Bali (1939) - Jack, Singing Telegram Boy
- What a Life (1939) - 'Butch' Williams
- Our Neighbors – The Carters (1939) - Junior Carter
- Alias the Deacon (1940) - Willie Clark
- Let's Make Music (1941) - Tommy
- Meet John Doe (1941) - Red (uncredited)
- Men of Boys Town (1941) - Older Homeless Boy (uncredited)
- Tillie the Toiler (1941) - Glennie
- Code of the Outlaw (1942) - Tim Hardin
- Between Us Girls (1942) - Boy (uncredited)
- Kid Dynamite (1943) - Beanie Miller
- He Hired the Boss (1943) - Jimmy
- Clancy Street Boys (1943) - Benny
- Follow the Band (1943) - Cootie
- A Lady Takes a Chance (1943) - Henry (uncredited)
- Nobody's Darling (1943) - Julius aka The Deacon
- Fired Wife (1943) - Bellboy (uncredited)
- Thank Your Lucky Stars (1943) - Page Boy (uncredited)
- Her Adventurous Night (1946) - Horace
- The Adventures of Don Coyote (1947) - Ted Riley
- Gas House Kids Go West (1947) - Orvie
- Gas House Kids in Hollywood (1947) - Orvie
- Big Town After Dark (1947) - McGonigle (uncredited)
- Angels' Alley (1948) - Harry 'Jag' Harmon
- Heart of Virginia (1948) - 'Breezy' Brent
- Jinx Money (1948) - Butch
- The Babe Ruth Story (1948) - Newsboy (uncredited)
- Smugglers' Cove (1948) - Butch
- Trouble Makers (1948) - Butch
- Fighting Fools (1949) - Butch
- Hold That Baby! (1949) - Butch
- Any Number Can Play (1949) - Tommy Smith (uncredited)
- Angels in Disguise (1949) - Butch
- Master Minds (1949) - Butch
- Cheaper by the Dozen (1950) - Joe Scales (uncredited)
- Southside 1-1000 (1950) - Eddie, Bellboy
- Crazy Over Horses (1951) - Butch
- Hold That Line (1952) - Butch (Credited as David Bartlett)
- Belles on Their Toes (1952) - 'Bubber' Beasley (uncredited)
- Here Come the Marines (1952) - Butch
- Feudin' Fools (1952) - Butch
- No Holds Barred (1952) - Butch
- Jalopy (1953) - Butch
- The Girls of Pleasure Island (1953) - Marine (uncredited)
- Loose in London (1953) - Butch
- Clipped Wings (1953) - Butch
- Private Eyes (1953) - Butch
- Paris Playboys (1954) - Butch
- The Bowery Boys Meet the Monsters (1954) - Butch
- Rear Window (1954) - Man with Miss Torso (uncredited)
- Jungle Gents (1954) - Butch
- Bowery to Bagdad (1955) - Butch
- High Society (1955) - Butch
- Spy Chasers (1955) - Butch
- Jail Busters (1955) - Butch
- Dig That Uranium (1956) - Butch
