= Master Minds (1949 film) =

1949 film by Jean Yarbrough

- Theatrical poster to Master Minds
- Directed by: Jean Yarbrough
- Written by: Charles Marion
- Produced by: Jan Grippo
- Starring: Leo Gorcey; Huntz Hall; Gabriel Dell; David Gorcey; William Benedict
- Cinematography: Marcel LePicard
- Edited by: William Austin
- Music by: Edward J. Kay
- Distributed by: Monogram Pictures
- Release date: November 29, 1949
- Running time: 64 minutes
- Country: United States
- Language: English

Master Minds is a 1949 American comedy horror film by Monogram Pictures. It is the sixteenth film in The Bowery Boys series.

In the film, a man gains the ability of precognition. He uses it perform at a sideshow carnival. He is soon kidnapped by a mad scientist who wants to use him in a brain transplantation experiment. The man's brain is scheduled to be transferred into the scientist's version of Frankenstein's monster.

== Plot ==
Sach has eaten too much candy, which gives him a toothache that allows him to predict the future. Slip and Gabe come up with an idea to make money from this and put him in a sideshow carnival. A mad scientist sees Sach's photo in the newspaper and reads about his ability. He visits the carnival where after seeing Sach in action he decides to kidnap him so he can transfer his brain into the brain of Atlas, a Frankenstein type humanoid creature.

The boys attempt to rescue Sach but are captured themselves. Meanwhile Sach and Atlas have had their brains swapped temporarily and Louie has arrived in the hopes of rescuing all of them. He dons a knight's armor and temporarily outwits the scientists but is eventually captured as well. However, the police, who Louie tried to alert earlier, arrive and arrest the scientists. Slip then tries to put Sach back on display at the carnival, but Sach says he no longer has a toothache because he swallowed it.

== Cast ==
=== The Bowery Boys ===
- Leo Gorcey as Terrance Aloysius 'Slip' Mahoney
- Huntz Hall as Horace Debussy 'Sach' Jones
- William Benedict as Whitey
- David Gorcey as Chuck
- Bennie Bartlett as Butch

=== Remaining cast ===
- Gabriel Dell as Gabe Moreno
- Bernard Gorcey as Louie Dumbrowski
- Alan Napier as Dr. Druzik
- Skelton Knaggs as Hugo
- Glenn Strange as Atlas
- William Yetter as Otto
- Jane Adams as Nancy Marlowe

== Production ==
Bennie Bartlett temporarily left the series after this film. He would be replaced by Buddy Gorman for the next seven films.

Released after Abbott and Costello Meet Frankenstein, the tagline "The Bowery Boys Meet the Monster" is used in the film's trailer, but that title was not used until the 1954 film. The Bowery Boys Meet the Monsters

== Release ==
The film was released by Monogram Pictures on November 29, 1949.

== Home media ==
Warner Archives released the film on made-to-order DVD in the United States as part of "The Bowery Boys, Volume One" on November 23, 2012.

Preceded by Angels in Disguise; 1949	'The Bowery Boys' movies 1946-1958	Succeeded by Blonde Dynamite; 1950
