= Angels in Disguise (film) =

1949 film by Jean Yarbrough

- Film poster
- Directed by: Jean Yarbrough
- Written by: Gerald Schnitzer; Charles Marion
- Produced by: Jan Grippo
- Starring: Leo Gorcey; Huntz Hall; Gabriel Dell; David Gorcey; William Benedict
- Narrated by: Leo Gorcey
- Cinematography: Marcel LePicard
- Edited by: William Austin
- Music by: Edward J. Kay
- Distributed by: Monogram Pictures
- Release date: September 11, 1949 (U.S.)
- Running time: 67 minutes
- Country: United States
- Language: English

Angels in Disguise is a 1949 comedy film directed by Jean Yarbrough and starring The Bowery Boys. The film was released on September 11, 1949, by Monogram Pictures and is the fifteenth film in the series.

== Plot ==
Sach Jones and Slip Mahoney are copy boys for the New York Daily Chronicle newspaper who hear that two local police officers, including their friend Gabe, have been shot in the line of duty while trying to stop a robbery. Gabe survives, but his partner does not, so they decide to help find the person responsible - a gangster and member of the Loop Gang from Chicago. The boys then decide to go undercover to try to infiltrate the mob and expose them. They get a green light from their editor, Joe Cobb, to go and investigate the story further. They encounter two members of the Loop Gang and befriend them, with the result that they get to meet their boss, Angles Carson. Angles likes the boys and soon they are involved with the gang's next hit - a new robbery.

Before long, they get to meet Angles' boss, Carver, who takes a liking to them because he thinks they are tough gangsters that he can use in his operation. He lets the boys in on a plan to rob the Gotham Steel Works the next day, and Slip sends this information to the police. An ambush is set, to stop the robbery and catch the gangsters, but someone on the inside slips the information about the ambush to Carver. Carver changes his plans and instead tries to rob the Beacon Machine Works. Slip has no possibility to warn the police, but when Carver is trying to crack open the safe at Beacon Machine Works the next evening, Slip gets a chance to call his editor, who passes the information forward. Unfortunately, another employee at the Chronicle, a cartoonist named Lowell, informs Carver that the police are coming. There is a showdown between Slip and Sach and the Loop Gang members, and Slip and Sach are beat up badly. They are taken to the hospital, and once there, Sach calls for a nurse to take care of him, but when a male nurse arrives he sends him to over to Slip and gets up to leave. Just as he is about to walk out the door a female nurse comes in and takes over massaging Slip's back.

== Cast ==
=== The Bowery Boys ===
- Leo Gorcey as Terrance Aloysius 'Slip' Mahoney
- Huntz Hall as Horace Debussy 'Sach' Jones
- William Benedict as Whitey
- David Gorcey as Chuck
- Bennie Bartlett as Butch

=== Remaining cast ===
- Gabriel Dell as Gabe Moreno
- Bernard Gorcey as Louie Dumbrowski
- Mickey Knox as Angles
- Edward Ryan as Carver
- Richard Benedict as Miami
- Joseph Turkel as Johnny Mutton
- Jane Adams as First Pretty Nurse
- Marie Blake as Mildred 'Millie', Telephone Operator
- Dorothy Abbott as Reception Nurse
- Jack Gargan as Rewrite Man
- Don C. Harvey as Ralph Hodges (as Don Harvey)
- Jack Mower as Policeman at Hospital
- Pepe Hern as Bertie Spangler
- Lee Phelps as Watchman

== Home media ==
Warner Archives released the film on made-to-order DVD in the United States as part of "The Bowery Boys, Volume Three" on October 1, 2013.

| Preceded by Hold That Baby! 1949 | 'The Bowery Boys' movies 1946-1958 | Succeeded by Master Minds; 1949 |
