= The Gas House Kids "in Hollywood" =

1947 film by Edward L. Cahn

- Directed by: Edward Cahn
- Screenplay by: Robert E. Kent
- Produced by: Sam Baerwitz; Ben Stoloff (in charge of production)
- Starring: Carl "Alfalfa" Switzer; Benny Bartlett; Rudy Wissler; Tommy Bond
- Cinematography: James Brown
- Edited by: W. Donn Hayes; Alfred DeGaetano (editorial supervision)
- Music by: Albert Glasser
- Production company: Producers Releasing Corporation
- Distributed by: Producers Releasing Corporation; Pathe Industries, Inc.
- Release date: August 23, 1947
- Running time: 62 minutes
- Country: United States
- Language: English

The Gas House Kids "in Hollywood" is a 1947 American comedy feature directed by Edward Cahn and starring Carl "Alfalfa" Switzer, Benny Bartlett, Rudy Wissler, and Tommy Bond. It was the third and last in the series of Gas House Kids films, about a group of unruly boys from New York City.

== Plot ==
Alfie, Orvie, Scat, and Chimp, driving from New York to California, stop to help a motorist in distress, who invites them to be his house guests. Their host is Prof. Crawford, an eccentric scientist who is experimenting with a cadaver. At a poolside party, the boys discover another corpse: the realtor who sold the secluded house to Crawford. The boys crash a movie studio, taking the murder mystery to their idol, movie detective Lance Carter. What they don't know is that Carter is in debt to gambler Mitch Gordon. Gordon and Carter are determined to find a treasure hidden somewhere in the Crawford house. Alfie and Chimp, exploring the depths of the creepy old house, encounter a skeleton, eerie voices, and apparitions. Gordon captures the kids and leaves them to languish there. Scat and Orvie spring into action, reuniting with their pals. Together they slug it out with the villains.

== Cast ==
- Carl "Alfalfa" Switzer as Alfalfa
- Benny Bartlett as Orvie
- Rudy Wissler as Scat
- Tommy Bond as Chimp
- James Burke as Police Lt. Mack
- Jan Bryant as Hazel Crawford
- Michael Whalen as Lance Carter
- Douglas Fowley as Mitch Gordon
- Frank Orth as Police Captain
- Lyle Latell as Carter's Henchman
- Milton Parsons as Prof. Gately Crawford
- Kenneth Ferrill as Garry Edwards, Hazel's Boyfriend (Uncredited)
- Gene Roth as Policeman
- William Bailey as Director

== Production ==
The low-budget PRC studio had produced a juvenile-delinquency feature in 1946, Gas House Kids, in direct competition with Monogram Pictures' new and popular series with The Bowery Boys. Former leader of the Dead End Kids Billy Halop and former leader of the Our Gang comedies Carl "Alfalfa" Switzer were signed to head the cast.

By 1947 Halop had departed PRC, which decided to retool Gas House Kids as a comedy series. Switzer recruited his buddy Tommy Bond, another Our Gang alumnus, and they were joined by juvenile actors Rudy Wissler (the singing voice of the young Al Jolson in The Jolson Story) and Benny Bartlett. The new Gas House Kids series was successful, but came to an abrupt halt in mid-1947, after only two installments, when PRC discontinued operations. The Gas House Kids in Hollywood was in fact the very last PRC production, released August 23, 1947. PRC's successor, Eagle-Lion, released some low-budget westerns in 1948 under the PRC trademark.

== Bibliography ==
- The American Film Institute Catalog of Motion Pictures Produced in the United States: Feature Films, 1941 - 1950: Feature Films. University of California Press, 1999.
