= Dig That Uranium =

1956 film by Edward Bernds

- Directed by: Edward Bernds
- Written by: Bert Lawrence; Elwood Ullman
- Produced by: Ben Schwalb
- Starring: Leo Gorcey; Huntz Hall; David Gorcey; Bernard Gorcey; Bennie Bartlett
- Cinematography: Harry Neumann
- Edited by: William Austin
- Music by: Marlin Skiles
- Production company: Allied Artists Pictures
- Distributed by: Allied Artists Pictures
- Release date: January 8, 1956
- Running time: 61 minutes
- Country: United States
- Language: English

Dig That Uranium is a 1956 American comedy film directed by Edward Bernds and starring the comedy team of The Bowery Boys, with veteran supporting players Raymond Hatton and Mary Beth Hughes. The film was released on January 8, 1956, by Allied Artists and is the fortieth film in the series. It was the last of eight Bowery Boys films directed by Bernds.

== Plot ==
Sach brings con artist Shifty Robinson to Louie's Sweet Shop. Shifty regales the gang with tales of getting rich quick, and sells them a Geiger counter and a uranium mine. When they arrive in Nevada, local thugs try to chase them off. When the ringleader finds out the boys own a mine, he lets them stay in town, planning to follow them and take over the mine. Eventually the boys defeat the thugs and find the uranium, only to discover that it's on an Indian reservation and doesn't belong to them.

== Cast ==
=== The Bowery Boys ===
- Leo Gorcey as Terence Aloysius "Slip" Mahoney
- Huntz Hall as Horace Debussy "Sach" Jones
- David Gorcey as Charles "Chuck" Anderson (credited as David Condon)
- Bennie Bartlett as Butch Williams

=== Supporting cast ===
- Bernard Gorcey as Louie Dumbrowski
- Raymond Hatton as Hank "Mac" MacKenzie
- Harry Lauter as Ron Haskell
- Mary Beth Hughes as Jeanette
- Richard Powers as Frank
- Myron Healey as Joe
- Carl Switzer as Shifty Robinson

== Production ==
This film marks the last appearance of Bennie Bartlett, who left the series, and Bernard Gorcey, who was killed in a car accident on September 11, 1955. Director Edward Bernds also left the series after the filming.

Production costs kept rising during the 1950s but the budgets stayed about the same because the films were sold to the exhibitors at fixed prices, and thus could generate only so much revenue. As a result, fewer supporting actors were hired for the series, and most of those were faded names. The cast of Dig That Uranium features only four movie veterans: former western sidekick Raymond Hatton, former Fox ingenue Mary Beth Hughes, former western star Tom Keene (appearing here as Richard Powers), and former Our Gang star Carl "Alfalfa" Switzer.

Much of the picture was shot at Iverson's Ranch, the location for thousands of western features and TV shows over the decades. This gave the film a small veneer of authenticity, as did the casting of veteran cowboy sidekick Hatton as a grizzled old prospector.

== Critical reception ==
The studio had been releasing a new Bowery Boys picture every three months since 1946. By the mid-1950s the films had become so standardized and predictable -- each new one being about as good as its predecessors, and earning roughly the same revenue each time out -- that many trade papers no longer bothered to review them. Individual exhibitors had to decide for themselves if their audiences still followed the Bowery Boys. When Dig That Uranium went into release in January 1956, only two trade publications reviewed it. Variety reported that "the laughs come only spasmodically" and that the screenwriters "seemed to have concentrated to a greater extent on Leo Gorcey's malaprops than on a story line upon which to hang some good comedic situations." The Exhibitor rated it a "better than average Bowery Boys entry" but also noted that "the usual nonsense and so-called comedy is present in abundance, and the story is sufficiently involved to casually interest the viewer."

When Dig That Uranium was issued on DVD in 2013, critic Stuart Galbraith IV, writing in DVD Talk, described Dig That Uranium as "pretty funny," noting that "[Edward] Bernds was no great auteur, but he knew his way around broad slapstick [...] and he and frequent partner [Elwood] Ullman incorporate some of the same Three Stooges gags and comedy situations into [the] film well," and like other Bowery Boys films, it is "likeable in the same way one becomes attached to a smelly old mutt."

== Home media ==
Warner Archives released the film on made-to-order DVD in the United States as part of "The Bowery Boys, Volume Three" on October 1, 2013.

Preceded by Jail Busters; 1955	'The Bowery Boys' movies 1946-1958	Succeeded by Crashing Las Vegas; 1956
