= Jail Busters =

- Theatrical poster
- Directed by: William Beaudine
- Written by: Edward Bernds (screenplay); Elwood Ullman (screenplay)
- Produced by: Ben Schwalb
- Starring: Leo Gorcey; Huntz Hall; David Gorcey; Bernard Gorcey; Bennie Bartlett
- Cinematography: Carl E. Guthrie
- Edited by: William Austin
- Music by: Marlin Skiles
- Production company: Allied Artists Pictures
- Distributed by: Allied Artists Pictures
- Release date: September 18, 1955
- Running time: 61 minutes
- Country: United States
- Language: English

Jail Busters is a 1955 American comedy film starring the comedy team of The Bowery Boys. The film was released on September 18, 1955, by Allied Artists and is the thirty-ninth film in the series.

== Plot ==
Chuck gets a job working for a newspaper. When promoted, he has to go under cover in the state prison to dig up some information on some of the inmates. When one of the inmates beats Chuck up and lands him in the hospital, it's up to Slip, Sach, and Butch to finish Chuck's job. Slip decides that he and the boys should commit a crime so that they can be sent to jail. Another reporter, Cy Bowman, agrees to inform the penitentiary that the boys are working under cover for the newspaper once they get arrested. However, Bowman does not keep his promise. The trio are forced to spend what they think is a short sentence in jail. While there, the boys dig up some information on Percival P. Lannigan and some other inmates who have been living it up in jail, unknown to the warden. Lannigan soon gets word that Slip and his pals are under cover for Chuck (whom Lannigan had beaten up earlier), and intends to have Chuck and Louie killed. The boys eventually expose the inmates scam and turn them over to the warden, who pardons them and arranges for their release.

== Cast ==
=== The Bowery Boys ===
- Leo Gorcey as Terence Aloysius 'Slip' Mahoney
- Huntz Hall as Horace Debussy 'Sach' Jones
- David Gorcey as Charles 'Chuck' Anderson (Credited as David Condon)
- Bennie Bartlett as Butch Williams

=== Remaining cast ===
- Bernard Gorcey as Louie Dumbrowski
- Barton MacLane as Captain Jenkins, head guard
- Anthony Caruso as Percival P. Lannigan
- Percy Helton as Warden B.W. Oswald
- Lyle Talbot as Cy Bowman
- Michael Ross as Big Greenie
- John Harmon as Tomcyk
- Murray Alper as Gus

=== Cast notes ===
After the death of Bernard Gorcey, just seven days before this film was released, Percy Helton, who played the warden in this film, was one of the choices for taking the place of Gorcey's character, Louie Dumbrowski. Two years later he would play the character of Mike Clancy, a character similar to Louie, in the film Spook Chasers.

== Production ==
Jail Busters was filmed under the working title of Doing Time and is the only film in the series with no females in the cast.

== Home media ==
Warner Archives released the film on made-to-order DVD in the United States as part of "The Bowery Boys, Volume Four" on August 26, 2014.

Preceded by Spy Chasers; 1955	'The Bowery Boys' movies 1946-1958	Succeeded by Dig That Uranium; 1956
