= Crazy Over Horses =

1951 comedy film directed by William Beaudine

- Directed by: William Beaudine
- Written by: Tim Ryan
- Produced by: Jerry Thomas
- Starring: Leo Gorcey; Huntz Hall; David Gorcey; William Benedict
- Cinematography: Marcel LePicard
- Edited by: William Austin
- Music by: Edward J. Kay
- Production company: Monogram Pictures
- Distributed by: Monogram Pictures
- Release date: November 18, 1951 (U.S.)
- Running time: 65 minutes
- Country: United States
- Language: English

Crazy Over Horses is a 1951 comedy film starring the Bowery Boys. The film was released on November 18, 1951 by Monogram Pictures and is the 24th feature in the Bowery Boys series.

== Plot ==
Louie is owed money by a stable owner and sends Slip and the boys to collect the debt. They return with a horse called My Girl as payment. Local gangsters want the horse and switch their horse, Tarzana, for My Girl. The boys discover the ruse and the horses are switched several more times. After the boys finally procure the real My Girl, Sach races her against Tarzana and several others, ending with a photo finish in which My Girl beats Tarzana by a tongue. The gangsters quickly try to leave town before their boss finds them.

== Cast ==
=== The Bowery Boys ===
- Leo Gorcey as Terrance Aloysius 'Slip' Mahoney
- Huntz Hall as Horace Debussy 'Sach' Jones
- William Benedict as Whitey
- David Gorcey as Chuck (Credited as David Condon)
- Bennie Bartlett as Butch

=== Remaining cast ===
- Bernard Gorcey as Louie Dumbrowski
- Gloria Saunders as Terry Flynn
- Ted de Corsia as Duke
- Tim Ryan as Mr. Flynn
- Allen Jenkins as "Weepin' Willie"

== Production ==
This was the first film for which David Gorcey was credited using his mother's maiden name of Condon. It also marks the return of Bennie Bartlett to the gang and William Benedict's final appearance in the series. Benedict said: "I suddenly decided I had enough, and it was getting a little rough doing 'em - emotionally. There was a lot of infighting going on and I said, 'I don't need this.'"

== Home media ==
Warner Archives released the film on made-to-order DVD in the United States as part of The Bowery Boys, Volume One on November 23, 2012.

== See also ==
- List of films about horses
- List of films about horse racing

Preceded by Let's Go Navy! 1951	'The Bowery Boys' movies 1946-1958	Succeeded by Hold That Line; 1952
