= Hold That Line =

1952 film by William Beaudine

- Directed by: William Beaudine
- Written by: Tim Ryan; Charles R. Marion
- Produced by: Jerry Thomas
- Starring: Leo Gorcey; Huntz Hall; David Gorcey; Bernard Gorcey
- Cinematography: Marcel LePicard
- Edited by: William Austin
- Music by: Edward J. Kay
- Production company: Monogram Pictures
- Distributed by: Monogram Pictures
- Release date: March 23, 1952
- Running time: 64 minutes
- Country: United States
- Language: English

Hold That Line is a 1952 American comedy film directed by William Beaudine and starring the Bowery Boys, John Bromfield, Veda Ann Borg, and Gloria Winters. The film was released on March 23, 1952 by Monogram Pictures and is the 25th film in the series.

== Plot ==
Two prosperous alumni of Ivy University make a wager that anyone, from any walk of life, can succeed in college if just given the chance. They select the least likely subjects in New York -- Slip Mahoney and his gang -- to prove the theory by attending the university. The boys' boisterous behavior nearly gets them expelled, but Sach invents a "vitamin" drink that makes him invincible. They all join the football team and Sach becomes the star player, leading them to the big championship game. A local gambler, seeing an opportunity to make some money, kidnaps Sach to prevent him from playing. Slip and the rest of the gang rescue Sach and return him to the game. Sach is out of "vitamins," so Slip uses a trick play that distracts the other team and allows him to score the winning touchdown. Back in the chemistry lab, Sach concocts a new formula that he says will allow him to fly, to the gang's horror.

== Cast ==
=== The Bowery Boys ===
- Leo Gorcey as Terrance Aloysius "Slip" Mahoney
- Huntz Hall as Horace Debussy "Sach" Jones
- David Gorcey as Chuck (credited erroneously as David Conden)
- Bennie Bartlett as Butch (credited erroneously as David Bartlett)
- Gil Stratton Jr. as Junior

=== Supporting cast ===
- Bernard Gorcey as Louie Dumbrowski and Morris Dumbrowski
- John Bromfield as Biff Wallace
- Bob Nichols as Harold Lane
- Taylor Holmes as Dean Forrester
- Pierre Watkin as Morgan T. Stanhope
- Francis Pierlot as A. J. Billingsley
- Veda Ann Borg as Candy Callin
- Gloria Winters as Penny Wells
- Mona Knox as Katie Wayne
- George J. Lewis as Mike

== Production ==
The working title was College Crazy. The Bowery Boys pictures were often topical, capitalizing on a popular trend -- in this case, college-campus movies like Bedtime for Bonzo, Monkey Business, and She's Working Her Way Through College.

Hold That Line marks the first of two appearances by Gil Stratton, Jr. as a member of the gang, replacing Billy Benedict. Stratton was reluctant to join the series, as his agent had accepted the job for the money, and Stratton tried to remain as inconspicuous as possible in the films, often giving his dialogue to Leo Gorcey or Huntz Hall.

Director William Beaudine captured the college-campus and football elements of Hold That Line so well that Monogram Pictures hired him to film a more elaborate football film, The Rose Bowl Story (1952).

== Reception ==
Trade reviewers thought Hold That Line was about par for the series. Trade publisher Pete Harrison: "Followers of the pictures of this series should be satisfied with the comedy provoked by the foolish antics of the Bowery Boys. There is plentiful of the usual comedy, contributed particularly by Huntz Hall, and for good measure the action offers some football playing thrills. Director William Beaudine again does good work." Variety: "Slapstick and uninhibited comedy, which have marked Monogram's Bowery Boys series since its inception, get a workover in Hold That Line. Humor is of the obvious type. However, this entry will qualify as supporting fare where exhibs are seeking something with a light touch to balance off heavy drama."

Exhibitor reports were more positive. "Believe this is the best one they've made." (James Balkcom of Gray, Georgia, Nov. 29, 1952); "I never miss on these Bowery Boys. They are really tops here. I wish I could play one every week. Some people had to leave their TV sets, 'cause I did better than average business." (James Hardy of Shoals, Indiana, Feb. 14, 1953) "This time the Bowery Boys go to college, with the resulting number of laughs and comedy situations. Good if your audience likes this series, and that means just about every situation. Business good." (Lew Young of Palmerston, Ontario, Apr. 4, 1953); "A typical Bowery Boys picture. They have their following, and this one pleased them and sent them home happy." (Mrs. H. A. Fitch of Erin, Tennessee, Feb. 21, 1953).

== Home media ==
Warner Archives released the film on made-to-order DVD in the United States as part of The Bowery Boys, Volume Two set on April 9, 2013.

== See also ==
- List of American football films

Preceded by Crazy Over Horses; 1951	'The Bowery Boys' movies 1946-1958	Succeeded by Here Come the Marines; 1952
