= Gas House Kids Go West =

1947 film by William Beaudine

- Film poster
- Directed by: William Beaudine
- Written by: Robert E. Kent; Robert A. McGowan; Eugene Conrad; Sam Baerwitz
- Produced by: Benjamin Stoloff
- Starring: Emory Parnell; Chili Williams; Vince Barnett; William Wright
- Cinematography: William A. Sickner
- Edited by: Harry Reynolds
- Music by: Hans Sommer
- Production company: Producers Releasing Corporation
- Distributed by: Producers Releasing Corporation
- Release date: July 12, 1947
- Running time: 62 minutes
- Country: United States
- Language: English

Gas House Kids Go West is a 1947 American comedy film directed by William Beaudine. A sequel to the 1946 film Gas House Kids, which had starred former Dead End Kids leader Billy Halop, this new film emphasized comedy and recast the gang with Our Gang alumni Carl "Alfalfa" Switzer and Tommy Bond, East Side Kids alumnus Benny Bartlett, and juvenile actors Rudy Wissler and Ray Dolciame.

== Plot ==
The Gas House Kids of New York travel west to California after winning a basketball competition. The boys cash in their train tickets and decide to buy a used car instead, donating the money saved to charity. At a used-car lot, the shady dealer gives them a stolen car, too hot for New York, to drive cross-country to his contact in California. After depositing the car, the boys stay at a ranch occupied by a gang of crooks.

== Cast ==
- Carl Switzer as Alfalfa
- Benny Bartlett as Orvie
- Rudy Wissler as Scat
- Tommy Bond as Chimp
- Ray Dolciame as Corky
- Vince Barnett as Steve
- Emory Parnell as Police Sergeant Casey
- Chili Williams as Nan Crowley
- William Wright as Jim Kingsley
- Lela Bliss as Mrs. Crowley
- Ronn Marvin as Pulaski
- Art Miles as Sheriff
- Syd Saylor as Motorcycle Cop
- Jay Silverheels as Kingsley's Henchman
- Delmar Watson as Young Boy

== Soundtrack ==
Alfalfa sings "West of the Pecos".

== Bibliography ==
- Marshall, Wendy L. William Beaudine: From Silents to Television. Scarecrow Press, 2005.
