= High Society (1955 film) =

1955 comedy film directed by William Beaudine

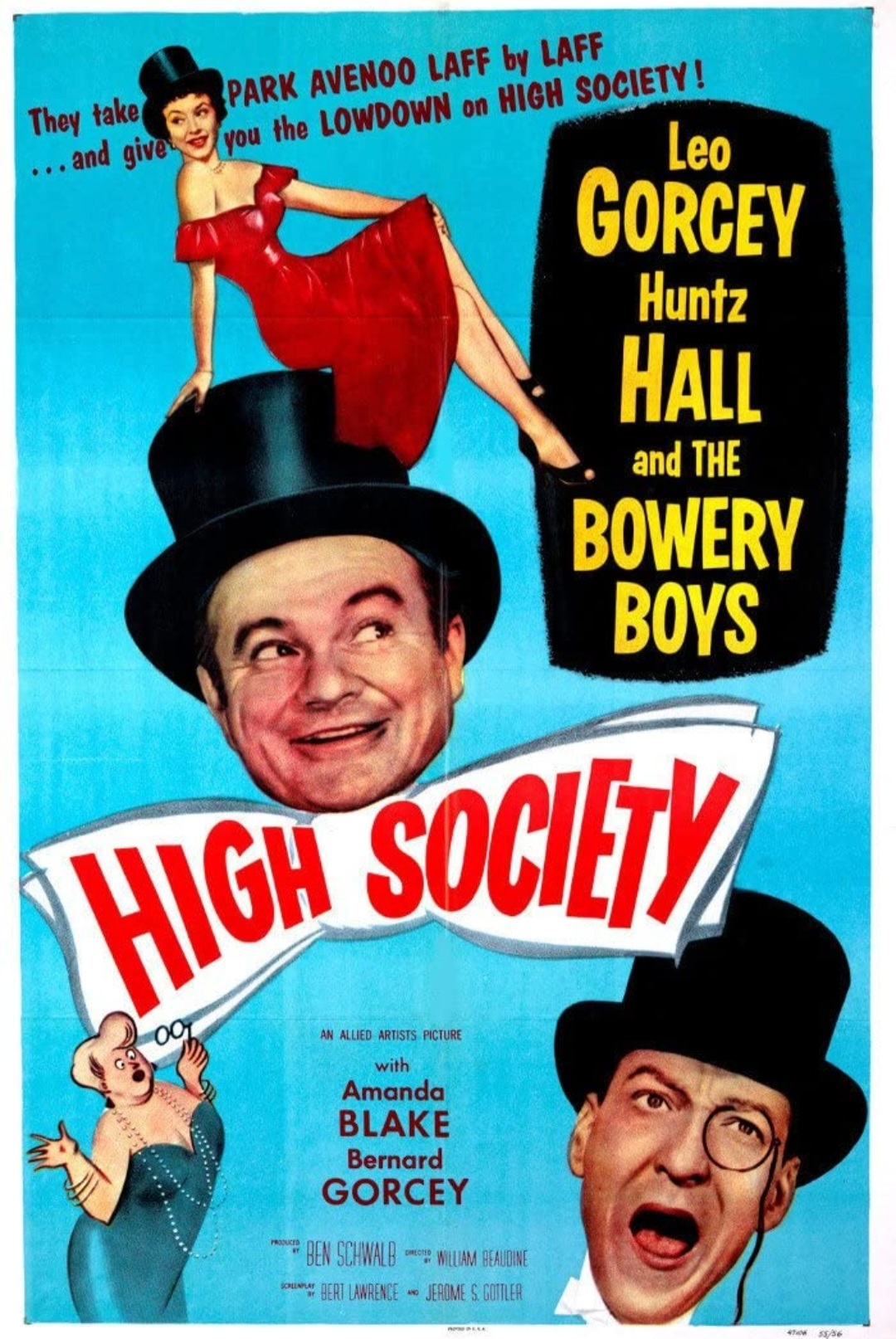
- Theatrical release poster
- Directed by: William Beaudine
- Screenplay by: Jerome S. Gottler; Bert Lawrence
- Story by: Edward Bernds; Ellwood Ullman
- Produced by: Ben Schwalb
- Starring: Leo Gorcey; Huntz Hall; David Gorcey; Bernard Gorcey; Leon Askin; Sig Ruman
- Cinematography: Harry Neumann
- Edited by: John C. Fuller
- Music by: Marlin Skiles
- Production company: Allied Artists Pictures
- Distributed by: Allied Artists Pictures
- Release date: April 17, 1955
- Running time: 61 minutes
- Country: United States
- Language: English

High Society is a 1955 comedy film directed by William Beaudine and starring the comedy team of The Bowery Boys. The film was released on April 17, 1955, by Allied Artists and is the 37th film in the series. It is the only film in the series to receive an Academy Award nomination, albeit through being mistaken for another film with the same title.

== Plot ==
Sach receives news that he is the heir to the Terwilliger Debussy Jones fortune. Accompanied by his pals Slip and Louie, he arrives at the Jones mansion to review the legal papers needed for him to claim his new fortune. However, Sach and Slip discover that the rightful heir, the young Terwilliger Jones III, is being cheated out his inheritance by the miscreant duo of Stuyvesant and Clarissa Jones. Sach and Slip, with the help of their fellow Bowery Boys, save the day and restore the heir’s inheritance.

== Cast ==
=== The Bowery Boys ===
- Leo Gorcey as Terence Aloysius "Slip" Mahoney
- Huntz Hall as Horace Debussy "Sach" Jones
- David Gorcey as Charles "Chuck" Anderson (credited as David Condon)
- Bennie Bartlett as Butch Williams

=== Additional cast ===
- Bernard Gorcey as Louie Dumbrowski
- Amanda Blake as Clarissa Jones
- Dayton Lummis as Stuyvesant Jones
- Ronald Keith as Terwilliger Debussy "Twig" Jones III
- Gavin Gordon as Frisbie
- Dave Barry as Palumbo, the pianist
- Paul Harvey as Henry Baldwin

=== Cast notes ===
Chuck (David Gorcey) and Butch (Bennie Bartlett) only appear at the beginning and end of this film.

== Academy Awards gaffe ==
For the 29th Academy Awards, High Society was accidentally included on the ballot in the Best Story category. The error occurred because another film with the same title – the Metro-Goldwyn-Mayer production of the 1956 Cole Porter musical High Society starring Bing Crosby, Grace Kelly and Frank Sinatra – was in release. Edward Bernds and Elwood Ullman, the screenwriters for The Bowery Boys comedy, acknowledged their nomination was a mistake and successfully requested their removal from the Oscars ballot.

== Home media ==
Warner Archives released the film on made-to-order DVD in the United States as part of The Bowery Boys, Volume Two on April 9, 2013.

Preceded by Bowery to Bagdad; 1955	"The Bowery Boys" movies 1946-1958	Succeeded by Spy Chasers; 1955
