= The Bowery Boys Meet the Monsters =

1954 film by Edward Bernds

- Directed by: Edward Bernds
- Written by: Edward Bernds; Elwood Ullman
- Produced by: Ben Schwalb
- Starring: Leo Gorcey; Huntz Hall; David Gorcey; Bennie Bartlett; Bernard Gorcey; Ellen Corby; John Dehner
- Cinematography: Harry Neumann
- Edited by: William Austin
- Music by: Marlin Skiles
- Production company: Allied Artists Pictures
- Distributed by: Allied Artists Pictures
- Release date: June 6, 1954 (U.S.)
- Running time: 65 minutes
- Country: United States
- Language: English

The Bowery Boys Meet the Monsters is a 1954 American comedy horror film directed by Edward Bernds and starring The Bowery Boys, John Dehner and Ellen Corby. The film was released on June 6, 1954 by Allied Artists and is the thirty-fourth film in the series.

== Plot ==
The front window of Louie's Sweet Shop is a frequent victim of the local neighborhood kids' baseball games. The Bowery Boys think that a nearby vacant lot would be perfect for the kids to play ball, and keep out of trouble. Slip and Sach travel during a heavy rainstorm to visit the owners of the lot -- oninously named Gravesend -- at their home on Long Island. As it turn out, the owners, all members of the same family, are completely insane.

Derek, a mad scientist, wants a brain for his gorilla. His brother Anton wants a brain for his robot, Gorog. Their sister Amelia needs fresh meat to give to her man-eating tree, while their niece Francine is a vampire. Feeling that Slip and Sach are perfect for their personal needs, the family asks the two visitors to spend the night. The boys soon catch on to the family's schemes, causing a frantic chase through the house. Louie, Butch, and Chuck visit the home to search for Slip and Sach, and before long they also get caught up in the madness.

=== The Bowery Boys ===
- Leo Gorcey as Terrance Aloysius 'Slip' Mahoney
- Huntz Hall as Horace Debussy 'Sach' Jones
- David Gorcey as Chuck Anderson (credited as David Condon)
- Bennie Bartlett as Butch Williams

=== Supporting cast ===
- Bernard Gorcey as Louie Dumbrowski
- John Dehner as Dr. Derek Gravesend
- Lloyd Corrigan as Anton Gravesend
- Ellen Corby as Amelia Gravesend
- Laura Mason as Francine Gravesend
- Paul Wexler as Grissom, the butler
- Norman Bishop as Gorog, the robot (uncredited)
- Paul Bryar as Officer Martin (uncredited)
- Steve Calvert as Cosmos, the gorilla (uncredited)
- Rudy Lee as Herbie Wilkins (uncredited)

== Reception ==
Elwood Ullman and Edward Bernds had collaborated on numerous Three Stooges comedies, and some familiar Stooge material found its way into the Bowery Boys screenplay. Critical reception was negative, and Variety was frank: "Below-par bread-and-butter entry [that] goes overboard on the malapropisms which generally give zest to series. The production is on the weak side, not up to the usual standard, with appeal even for followers of the series apt to be limited... Film is badly in need of editing to eliminate duplication of action." Milton Luban of The Hollywood Reporter agreed point by point, in a review titled "Latest Bowery Drops Below Par": "The Bowery Boys series always has been a popular one as program support, but this one is going to strain the loyalty of its fans. An originally thin situation in which the lads are trapped by a collection of goofy scientists is sparsely developed by scripters Elwood Ullman and Edward Bernds, the action being repeated over and over again. Leo Gorcey goes completely overboard in his malapropisms, his dialogue becoming almost unintelligible. They become so far-fetched as to lose all comedy value."

Popular reception, however, was exceptional. Edward Bernds claimed the film was "the best moneymaker of all of them. Something about the juxtaposition of the Bowery Boys and a bunch of monsters appealed to audiences. Actually, every Bowery Boys picture made money; even if it was a bad one, it didn’t lose. Some made more money than others mainly on the basis of the title. The Bowery Boys Meet the Monsters stood out above the others in terms of profit." The Bowery Boys Meet the Monsters became a kiddie-matinée perennial, playing in theaters for the next 14 years.

== Home media ==
Warner Archives released the film on made-to-order DVD in the United States as part of "The Bowery Boys, Volume Two" on April 9, 2013.

Preceded by Paris Playboys; 1954	'The Bowery Boys' movies 1946-1958	Succeeded by Jungle Gents; 1954
