= Paris Playboys =

1954 film by William Beaudine

- Directed by: William Beaudine
- Written by: Elwood Ullman; Edward Bernds
- Produced by: Ben Schwalb
- Starring: Leo Gorcey; Huntz Hall; David Gorcey; Bernard Gorcey
- Cinematography: Harry Neumann
- Edited by: John C. Fuller
- Music by: Marlin Skiles
- Production company: Allied Artists Pictures
- Distributed by: Allied Artists Pictures
- Release date: March 7, 1954
- Running time: 65 minutes
- Country: United States
- Language: English

Paris Playboys is a 1954 American comedy film directed by William Beaudine and starring The Bowery Boys. The film was released on March 7, 1954, by Allied Artists and is the thirty-third film in the series.

== Plot ==
After Sach is mistaken by French professor as the missing Prof. Maurice Gaston LeBeau, they convince him to impersonate the professor in the hopes of driving the real professor out of hiding. Sach and Slip head off to Paris, along with Louie, and proceed with the plan, with everyone there thinking that the professor has amnesia. The real professor finds out about his impostor and returns to Paris, just in time to encounter spies who are trying to steal the professor's rocket fuel formula that he was working on when he disappeared. Sach, however, creates his own rocket formula that saves the day, and he is rewarded for his efforts in the end.

== Cast ==
=== The Bowery Boys ===
- Leo Gorcey as Terrance Aloysius 'Slip' Mahoney
- Huntz Hall as Horace Debussy 'Sach' Jones/ Prof. Maurice Gaston LeBeau
- David Gorcey as Chuck Anderson (Credited as David Condon)
- Bennie Bartlett as Butch Williams

=== Remaining cast ===
- Bernard Gorcey as Louie Dumbrowski
- Veola Vonn as Mimi DuBoise
- Steven Geray as Gaspard
- John E. Wengraf as Vidal
- Fritz Feld as Marcel

== Production ==
After thirty two films in this series, the opening title screen was changed from "Starring Leo Gorcey and the Bowery Boys" to "Starring Leo Gorcey, Huntz Hall and the Bowery Boys" beginning with this film.

In the film, David Gorcey and Bennie Bartlett only appear in an early scene at Louie's Sweet Shop, and have no lines of dialogue.

== Home media ==
Warner Archives released the film on made-to-order DVD in the United States as part of "The Bowery Boys, Volume Three" on October 1, 2013.

Preceded by Private Eyes; 1953	'The Bowery Boys' movies 1946-1958	Succeeded by The Bowery Boys Meet the Monsters; 1954
