= Huntz Hall =

American actor (1920–1999)

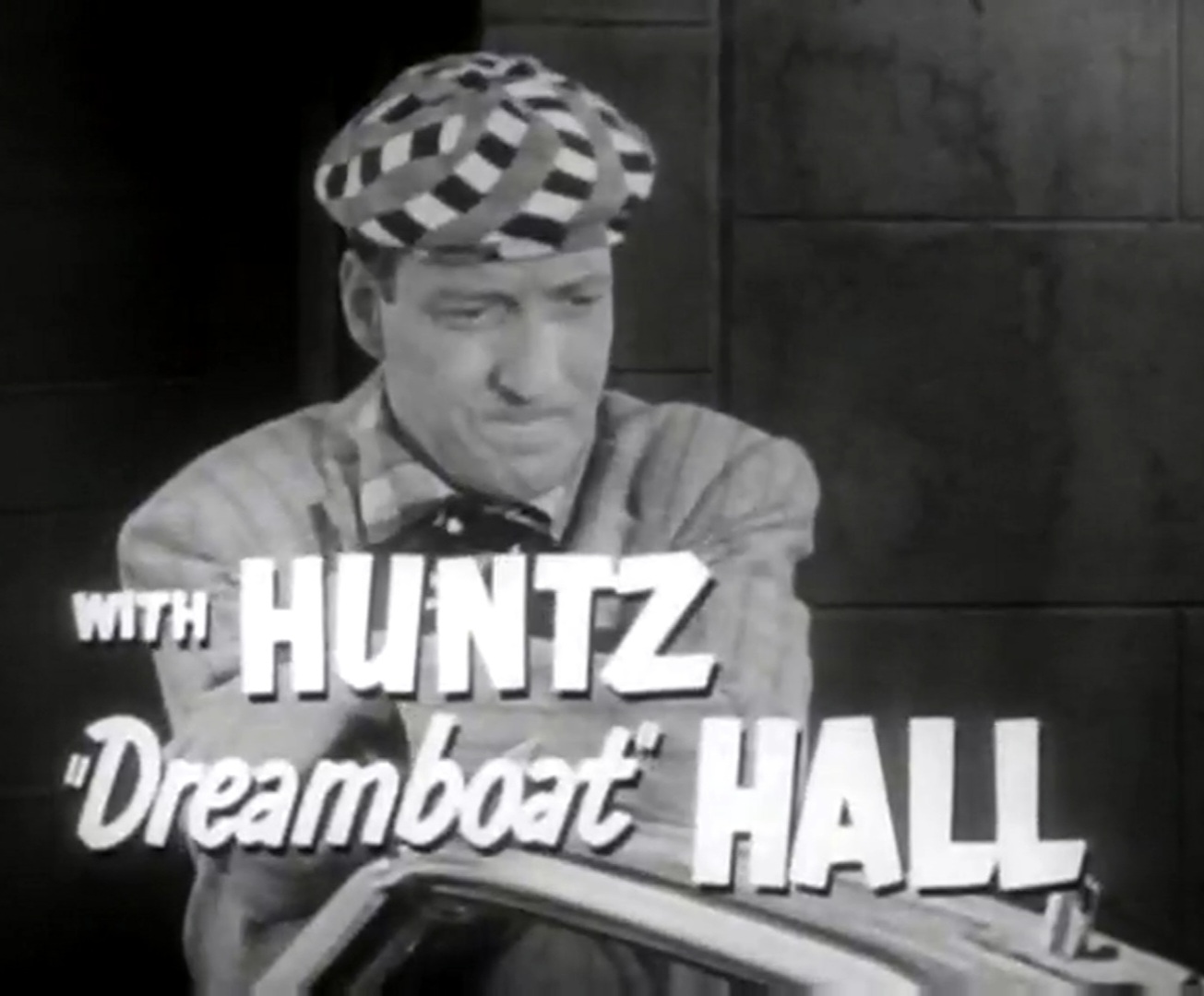
- Trailer for Blues Busters (1950)
- Born: Henry Richard Hall; August 15, 1920; New York City, U.S.
- Died: January 30, 1999 (aged 78); Los Angeles, California, U.S.
- Occupation: Actor
- Years active: 1935–1994
- Spouses: Elsie May Anderson (m. 1940; div. 1944) Leslie Wright (m. 1948; div. 1953) Colleen Vico (m. 1960, divorced) Leah Stevens (m. 1966)
- Children: 2

Henry Richard "Huntz" Hall (August 15, 1920 – January 30, 1999) was an American radio, stage, and movie performer who appeared in the popular "Dead End Kids" movies, including Angels with Dirty Faces (1938), and in the later "Bowery Boys" movies, during the late 1930s to the late 1950s.

== Life and career ==
Hall was born in 1920 in New York City to Joseph Patrick Hall, an engineer from Ireland, and his wife, Mary Ellen (née Mullen) Hall. The fourteenth of sixteen children, he was nicknamed "Huntz" because of his nose. He attended Catholic schools and started performing on radio at five years of age.

He appeared on Broadway in the 1935 production of Dead End, a play written and directed by Sidney Kingsley. Hall was then cast along with the other Dead End Kids in the 1937 film Dead End, directed by William Wyler and starring Humphrey Bogart.

Hall served in the United States Army during World War II. In 1943, he appeared in the USN training film "Don't Kill Your Friends" as moronic Ensign Dilbert the Pilot, who carelessly causes the death of a civilian and three servicemen.

Dilbert: Don't Kill Your Friends, 1943

In 1948, Hall was arrested for possession of marijuana. His trial, held in 1949, resulted in a hung jury.

Hall later played the increasingly buffoonish Horace DeBussy "Sach" Jones in 48 of "The Bowery Boys" films, gaining top billing when his longtime partner, Leo Gorcey, left the series in 1956. Hall and Gorcey reunited in Second Fiddle to a Steel Guitar (1966) and The Phynx (1969).

He was one of the celebrities featured on the cover of The Beatles' 1967 album, Sgt. Pepper's Lonely Hearts Club Band. In 1971, he co-starred with Art Metrano and Jamie Farr in the CBS situation comedy The Chicago Teddy Bears. His plans to produce a movie series, "The Ghetto Boys" (a take on the "Bowery Boys"), fell through. In 1973, Hall took part in Princess Grace of Monaco's Council for Drug Abuse, part of the Catholic Office of Drug Education.

In 1976, he appeared in Won Ton Ton, the Dog Who Saved Hollywood, and in 1977 he played Jesse Lasky in Ken Russell's film Valentino. His later films included Gas Pump Girls (1979) and The Escape Artist (1982), the latter reuniting him with Gabriel Dell. His final film appearance was in Auntie Lee's Meat Pies in 1993.

Behind Sach: The Huntz Hall Story by Jim Manago, published by BearManor Media in 2015, is the first biography of Hall.

=== Death ===
Hall died from cardiac disease on January 30, 1999, at the age of 78 in Los Angeles, California.

== Filmography ==
=== Film ===
Year	Film	Role	Notes
1937	Dead End	Dippy	Dead End Kids film
1938	Crime School	Goofy	Dead End Kids film
1938	Little Tough Guy	Pig	Dead End Kids film
1938	Angels with Dirty Faces	Crab	Dead End Kids film
1938	Swingtime in the Movies	Himself	Dead End Kids film / Short / Uncredited
1939	They Made Me a Criminal	Dippy	Dead End Kids film
1939	Hell's Kitchen	Bingo	Dead End Kids film
1939	The Angels Wash Their Faces	Huntz	Dead End Kids film
1939	Call a Messenger	Pig	Little Tough Guys film
1939	On Dress Parade	Cadet Johnny Cabot	Little Tough Guys film
1939	The Return of Doctor X	Pinky	
1940	You're Not So Tough	Albert 'Pig'	Little Tough Guys film
1940	Junior G-Men	Gyp	Little Tough Guys film / Serial
1940	Give Us Wings	Pig	Little Tough Guys film
1941	Hit the Road	Pig Grogan	Little Tough Guys film
1941	Bowery Blitzkrieg	Limpy	East Side Kids film
1941	Sea Raiders	Toby Nelson	Little Tough Guys film / Serial
1941	Spooks Run Wild	Glimpy	East Side Kids film
1941	Mob Town	Pig	Little Tough Guys film
1941	Zis Boom Bah	Skeets Skillhorn	
1942	Mr. Wise Guy	Glimpy Stone	East Side Kids film
1942	Junior G-Men of the Air	'Bolts' Larson	Little Tough Guys film / Serial
1942	Let's Get Tough!	Glimpy	East Side Kids film
1942	Private Buckaroo	Cpl. Anemic	
1942	Tough as They Come	Albert "Pig"	Little Tough Guys film
1942	Smart Alecks	Glimpy	East Side Kids film
1942	'Neath Brooklyn Bridge	Glimpy	East Side Kids film
1942	Junior Army	Bushy Thomas	
1942	Mug Town	Pig	Little Tough Guys film
1943	Kid Dynamite	Glimpy McGleavey	East Side Kids film
1943	Clancy Street Boys	Glimpy Freedhoff	East Side Kids film
1943	Ghosts on the Loose	Glimpy Freedhoff	East Side Kids film
1943	Keep 'Em Slugging	Pig	Little Tough Guys film
1943	Mr. Muggs Steps Out	Glimpy Freedhoff	East Side Kids film
1943	Dilbert, Don't Kill Your Friends	Ensign Dilbert	Short / U.S. Navy training film
1944	Million Dollar Kid	Glimpy Freedhoff	East Side Kids film
1944	Follow the Leader	Glimpy Freedhoff	East Side Kids film
1944	Block Busters	Glimpy	East Side Kids film
1944	Bowery Champs	Glimpy McClusky	East Side Kids film
1945	Docks of New York	Glimpy	East Side Kids film
1945	Bring on the Girls	Sailor	
1945	Wonder Man	Sailor	
1945	Mr. Muggs Rides Again	Glimpy	East Side Kids film
1945	Come Out Fighting	Glimpy	East Side Kids film
1945	A Walk in the Sun	Pvt. Carraway	
1946	Live Wires	Horace Debussy 'Sach' Jones	Bowery Boys film
1946	In Fast Company	Horace Debussy 'Sach' Jones	Bowery Boys film
1946	Bowery Bombshell	Horace Debussy 'Sach' Jones	Bowery Boys film
1946	Spook Busters	Horace Debussy 'Sach' Jones	Bowery Boys film
1946	Mr. Hex	'Sach' Sullivan	Bowery Boys film
1947	Hard Boiled Mahoney	Horace Debussy 'Sach' Jones	Bowery Boys film
1947	News Hounds	Horace Debussy 'Sach' Jones	Bowery Boys film
1947	Bowery Buckaroos	Horace Debussy 'Sach' Jones	Bowery Boys film
1948	Angels' Alley	Sach 'Turkey' Horace Debussy Jones	Bowery Boys film
1948	Jinx Money	Horace Debussy 'Sach' Jones	Bowery Boys film
1948	Smugglers' Cove	Horace Debussy 'Sach' Jones	Bowery Boys film
1948	Trouble Makers	Horace Debussy 'Sach' Jones "Chopper McGee"	Bowery Boys film
1949	Fighting Fools	Horace Debussy 'Sach' Jones	Bowery Boys film
1949	Hold That Baby!	Horace Debussy 'Sach' Jones	Bowery Boys film
1949	Angels in Disguise	Horace Debussy 'Sach' Jones	Bowery Boys film
1949	Master Minds	Horace Debussy 'Sach' Jones "Ali Ben Sachmo"	Bowery Boys film
1950	Blonde Dynamite	Horace Debussy 'Sach' Jones	Bowery Boys film
1950	Lucky Losers	Horace Debussy 'Sach' Jones "Sacramento Jones"	Bowery Boys film
1950	Triple Trouble	Horace Debussy 'Sach' Jones	Bowery Boys film
1950	Blues Busters	Horace Debussy 'Sach' Jones	Bowery Boys film
1951	Bowery Battalion	Horace Debussy 'Sach' Jones	Bowery Boys film
1951	Ghost Chasers	Horace Debussy 'Sach' Jones	Bowery Boys film
1951	Let's Go Navy!	Horace Debussy 'Sach' Jones	Bowery Boys film
1951	Crazy Over Horses	Horace Debussy 'Sach' Jones	Bowery Boys film
1952	Hold That Line	Horace Debussy 'Sach' Jones	Bowery Boys film
1952	Here Come the Marines	Horace Debussy 'Sach' Jones Jr.	Bowery Boys film
1952	Feudin' Fools	Horace Debussy 'Sach' Jones	Bowery Boys film
1952	No Holds Barred	Horace Debussy 'Sach' Jones	Bowery Boys film
1953	Jalopy	Horace Debussy 'Sach' Jones	Bowery Boys film
1953	Loose in London	Horace Debussy 'Sach' Jones	Bowery Boys film
1953	Clipped Wings	Horace Debussy 'Sach' Jones	Bowery Boys film
1953	Private Eyes	Horace Debussy 'Sach' Jones	Bowery Boys film
1954	Paris Playboys	Horace Debussy 'Sach' Jones / Prof. Maurice Gaston Le Beau	Bowery Boys film
1954	The Bowery Boys Meet the Monsters	Horace Debussy 'Sach' Jones	Bowery Boys film
1954	Jungle Gents	Horace Debussy 'Sach' Jones	Bowery Boys film
1955	Bowery to Bagdad	Horace Debussy 'Sach' Jones	Bowery Boys film
1955	High Society	Horace Debussy 'Sach' Jones	Bowery Boys film
1955	Spy Chasers	Horace Debussy 'Sach' Jones	Bowery Boys film
1955	Jail Busters	Horace Debussy 'Sach' Jones	Bowery Boys film
1955	Dig That Uranium	Horace Debussy 'Sach' Jones	Bowery Boys film
1956	Crashing Las Vegas	Horace Debussy 'Sach' Jones	Bowery Boys film
1956	Fighting Trouble	Horace Debussy 'Sach' Jones	Bowery Boys film
1956	Hot Shots	Horace Debussy 'Sach' Jones	Bowery Boys film
1957	Hold That Hypnotist	Horace Debussy 'Sach' Jones	Bowery Boys film
1957	Spook Chasers	Horace Debussy 'Sach' Jones	Bowery Boys film
1957	Looking for Danger	Horace Debussy 'Sach' Jones	Bowery Boys film
1957	Up in Smoke	Horace Debussy 'Sach' Jones	Bowery Boys film
1958	In the Money	Horace Debussy 'Sach' Jones	Bowery Boys film
1965	Second Fiddle to a Steel Guitar	Huntz	
1967	Gentle Giant	Dink Smith	
1970	The Phynx	Himself	
1974	Herbie Rides Again	Judge	
1975	The Manchu Eagle Murder Caper Mystery	Deputy Roy	
1976	Won Ton Ton: The Dog Who Saved Hollywood	Moving Man	
1977	Valentino	Jesse Lasky	
1979	Gas Pump Girls	Uncle Joe	
1982	The Escape Artist	Turnkey	
1987	Cyclone	Long John	
1992	Auntie Lee's Meat Pies	Farmer	Final film role

=== Television ===
Year	Series	Role	Notes
1966	Flipper	Barney	2 Episodes: "Disaster in the Everglades, Parts 1 and 2"
1970	Barefoot in the Park	Fellows	Episode: "Disorder in the Court"
1971	Escape	Gilbert	TV movie
1971	The Chicago Teddy Bears	Dutch	5 Episodes
1972	The Corner Bar	Sparky Schnauzer	Episode: "The Navy Reunion"
1975	The Ghost Busters	Gronk	2 Episodes: "Which Witch Is Which?" & "Merlin the Magician"
1975	The Sky's the Limit	Hitchhiker	TV movie
1976	Matt Helm	Willy	Episode: "Die Once, Die Twice"
1976	Good Heavens	Barney	Episode: "Good Neighbor Maxine"
1978	CHiPs	Armored car driver	Episode: "Crack-Up"
1982	Diff'rent Strokes	The Happy Wanderer	Episode: "Big Brother"
1984	The Ratings Game	Benny Bentson	TV movie
1988	Night Heat	Father O'Malley	Episode: "Bless Me Father"
1993	Daddy Dearest	The Pretzel Man	Episode: "American We"; final role
