= Gas House Kids =

1946 film by Sam Newfield

- Film poster
- Directed by: Sam Newfield
- Written by: Elsie Bricker; George Bricker; Raymond L. Schrock
- Produced by: Sigmund Neufeld
- Starring: Robert Lowery; Billy Halop; Teala Loring; Carl Switzer
- Cinematography: Jack Greenhalgh
- Edited by: Holbrook N. Todd; Harry Reynolds
- Music by: Leo Erdody
- Production company: Producers Releasing Corporation
- Distributed by: Producers Releasing Corporation
- Release date: October 9, 1946
- Running time: 71 minutes
- Country: United States
- Language: English

Gas House Kids is a 1946 American comedy-drama film directed by Sam Newfield and starring Billy Halop, Robert Lowery, Teala Loring, and Carl Switzer. It was inspired by the Dead End Kids, even casting erstwhile Dead End ringleader Billy Halop in a leading role.

== Cast ==
- Robert Lowery as Eddie O'Brien
- Billy Halop as Tony Albertini
- Teala Loring as Colleen Flanagan
- Carl Switzer as Sammy Levine
- David Reed as Pat Flanagan
- Rex Downing as Mickey Papopalous
- Rocco Lanzo as Gus Schmidt
- Hope Landin as Mrs. O'Brien
- Ralph Dunn as Detective O'Hara
- Paul Bryar as Shadow Sarecki
- Charles C. Wilson as Inspector Shannon

== Aftermath ==
After the release of Gas House Kids, the PRC studio decided to emulate Monogram's popular comedy series The Bowery Boys, another incarnation of the Dead End Kids but now with more emphasis on comedy. Billy Halop had only agreed to the one picture, and was no longer available for a sequel. The Gas House Kids series was now built around Halop's co-star Carl "Alfalfa" Switzer with a new cast of kids, and resulted in two features: Gas House Kids Go West and The Gas House Kids in Hollywood (both 1947). The series came to an abrupt end when the studio closed its doors in August 1947. It merged into the new Eagle-Lion Films company.

== Bibliography ==
- The American Film Institute Catalog of Motion Pictures Produced in the United States: Feature Films, 1941 - 1950: Feature Films. University of California Press, 1999.
