= Pre-Hysterical Hare =

1958 Warner Bros. cartoon directed by Robert McKimson

- Lobby card
- Directed by: Robert McKimson
- Story by: Tedd Pierce
- Starring: Mel Blanc; Dave Barry (uncredited)
- Edited by: Treg Brown
- Music by: John Seely
- Animation by: Ted Bonnicksen; Warren Batchelder; Tom Ray; George Grandpré
- Layouts by: Robert Gribbroek
- Backgrounds by: William Butler
- Color process: Technicolor
- Production company: Warner Bros. Cartoons
- Distributed by: Warner Bros. Pictures
- Release date: November 1, 1958
- Running time: 7 minutes
- Language: English

Pre-Hysterical Hare is a 1958 Warner Bros. Looney Tunes cartoon directed by Robert McKimson and written by Tedd Pierce. The short was released on November 1, 1958, and stars Bugs Bunny and Elmer Fudd. The two are in their usual hunter-and-bunny antics, but set in the Stone Age. The first half of the title is a play on "prehistorical".

This cartoon marks one of the few instances where Elmer Fudd is voiced by somebody other than Arthur Q. Bryan during the latter's lifetime, being voiced by Dave Barry instead. The film contains footage from the 1950 short film Caveman Inki directed by Chuck Jones and animated by Lloyd Vaughan, Ken Harris, Phil Monroe and Ben Washam.

== Plot ==
The narrative is Bugs Bunny and Elmer Fudd in a contemporary setting, where Elmer persistently fires his gun at Bugs. Bugs momentarily breaks the fourth wall to comment on the perennial chaos of Rabbit Season. He then leaps over a stone dike and unexpectedly falls into what he surmises to be a cave of giant Indigenous Americans, deduced from a colossal powder horn labeled as a time capsule from 10,000 BC to be opened in 1960 AD.

Inside, Bugs discovers a film reel, which he takes back to his hole to view using his film projector. The film depicts various anachronistic prehistoric scenes, including dinosaurs and mammals clashing, before introducing Elmer Fuddstone, a caveman version of Elmer, who declares his intent to hunt a sabre-toothed rabbit, a primitive incarnation of Bugs.

As Fuddstone engages in various slapstick hunting attempts, including a failed vine snare and a mishap with a poisonous berry, Bugs repeatedly outsmarts him. Bugs suggests the future invention of gunpowder and firearms, prompting Fuddstone to experiment with these ideas. His rudimentary gunpowder explodes, leaving him charred but determined.

Bugs then assists in creating a primitive firearm using a hollow stick and a taro root. When Elmer tries to use this makeshift gun, Bugs tricks him by reversing the barrel, causing Elmer to shoot himself in the face.

The film concludes with Bugs commenting that "No 'smart hunters' are a match for us 'dumb rabbits'", when a modern-day Elmer enters Bugs' hole and responds by saying "Oh that's what you think, Wabbit!", while inadvertently pointing his gun at himself and repeats his ancestor’s mistake. As Elmer accidentally shoots himself, Bugs remarks, "That's what I think", and imitates Elmer's trademark laughter.

== Home media ==
The film is available on the Looney Tunes Collector's Choice: Volume 3 Blu-ray.

Preceded by Knighty Knight Bugs	Bugs Bunny Cartoons; 1958	Succeeded by Baton Bunny
