= Private Eyes (1953 film) =

1953 film by Edward Bernds

- Directed by: Edward Bernds
- Written by: Elwood Ullman; Edward Bernds
- Produced by: Ben Schwalb
- Starring: Leo Gorcey; Huntz Hall; David Gorcey; Bernard Gorcey
- Cinematography: Carl Guthrie
- Edited by: Allan K. Wood
- Music by: Marlin Skiles
- Production company: Allied Artists Pictures
- Distributed by: Allied Artists Pictures
- Release date: December 6, 1953
- Running time: 64 minutes
- Country: United States
- Language: English

Private Eyes is a 1953 comedy film starring The Bowery Boys. The film was released on December 6, 1953, by Allied Artists and is the thirty-second film in the series.

== Plot ==
Sach is punched in the nose by Herbie, a local kid who the boys know, and acquires the ability to read people's minds. Slip sees this as an opportunity to buy a detective agency, and their first client is a beautiful blonde who is trying to escape from her connections with mobsters. She leaves behind a stolen mink coat and an envelope that would incriminate the mobsters. The mobsters, trying to get the envelope back, kidnap Herbie in the hopes to persuade the boys to return the envelope. Slip and Sach, after being tipped off where Herbie is being held, go there in disguise. They foil the mobsters plans and rescue Herbie.

== Cast ==
=== The Bowery Boys ===
- Leo Gorcey as Terrance Aloysius "Slip" Mahoney
- Huntz Hall as Horace Debussy "Sach" Jones
- David Gorcey as Chuck Anderson (Credited as David Condon)
- Bennie Bartlett as Butch Williams

=== Remaining cast ===
- Bernard Gorcey as Louie Dumbrowski
- Rudy Lee as Herbie
- Joyce Holden as Myra
- Robert Osterloh as Professor Damon
- Chick Chandler as Eddie the Detective
- Emil Sitka as the patient in the wheelchair
- Tim Ryan as Andy the Cop

== Production ==
The film was made under the working title of Bowery Bloodhounds.

== Home media ==
Warner Archives released the film on made-to-order DVD in the United States as part of "The Bowery Boys, Volume Two" on April 9, 2013.

Preceded by Clipped Wings; 1953	'The Bowery Boys' movies 1946-1958	Succeeded by Paris Playboys; 1954
