= Clipped Wings (1953 film) =

1953 film by Edward Bernds

- Film poster
- Directed by: Edward Bernds
- Written by: Elwood Ullman; Charles R. Marion
- Produced by: Ben Schwalb
- Starring: Leo Gorcey; Huntz Hall; David Gorcey; Bernard Gorcey
- Cinematography: Harry Neumann
- Edited by: Bruce B. Pierce
- Music by: Marlin Skiles
- Production company: Allied Artists Pictures
- Distributed by: Allied Artists Pictures
- Release date: August 14, 1953 (U.S.)
- Running time: 65 minutes
- Country: United States
- Language: English

Clipped Wings is a 1953 comedy film starring The Bowery Boys. The film was released on August 14, 1953, by Allied Artists and is the thirty-first film in the series.

== Plot ==
The boys' friend, Dave Moreno, is being held for treason by the U.S. Air Force. Slip and Sach go to headquarters to help Dave, but mistakenly enlist. Sach, due to a clerical error, is also mistakenly assigned to a WAF barracks. When the boys finally do visit Dave he tells them he does not need help, as he is secretly being used to capture enemy agents. Undeterred by Dave's words, Slip and Sach continue to investigate and wind up airborne, unable to pilot the plane. Good luck allows them to land safely, just where the spies are hiding out. They capture the spies and Dave's true mission is revealed.

== Cast ==
=== The Bowery Boys ===
- Leo Gorcey as Terrance Aloysius "Slip" Mahoney
- Huntz Hall as Horace Debussy "Sach" Jones
- David Gorcey as Chuck Anderson (credited as David Condon)
- Bennie Bartlett as Butch Williams

=== Supporting cast ===
- Bernard Gorcey as Louie Dumbrowski
- Todd Karns as Lt. Dave Moreno
- June Vincent as Dorene Thompson
- Fay Roope as Colonel Davenport
- Philip Van Zandt as Eckler
- Lyle Talbot as Capt. Blair
- Lou Nova as an Air Policeman
- Elaine Riley as Sgt. White
- Anne Kimbell as Allison
- Henry Kulky as Sgt. Brosky
- Ray Walker as Sgt. Pete Whitney
- Tris Coffin as an Air Show Radio Announcer
- Arthur Space as FBI Agent
- Conrad Brooks as Recruit
- Tommy Cook as Recruit

== Production ==
Filming began on February 13, 1953. In a prime example of product placement, the "Atomic Jet" coin-operated amusement ride from Nat Cohn's Riteway Sales, appearing in the film and advertising material, was offered to be installed in every theatre that showed Clipped Wings.

== Reception ==
The series's new director Edward Bernds and writer Elwood Ullman, both veterans of Three Stooges comedies, emphasized broad slapstick comedy instead of the crime-laced stories the studio had been using. The format change was well received by Motion Picture Daily: "Under Edward Bernds's comedy-experienced direction the indestructible comedians make the 62 minutes of show-wise Ben Schwalb's production pass pleasantly indeed." The Independent Film Journal agreed and commented on the Bowery Boys' steady following: "Clipped Wings stays right up to the level that has been set by the previous Bowery Boys films. The series keeps right on rolling along and this one should find favor in the pictures' regular situations." Trade publisher Pete Harrison sniffed at the broad-comedy approach but gave the film points for being another typical entry: "As in the previous pictures, Leo Gorcey and Huntz Hall romp through the proceedings with their zany antics and, though the situations are frequently labored and contrived, they manage to evoke many laughs." Harrison also dismissed the story as being "completely nonsensical, but it moves along swiftly and should be enjoyed by those who accept it for what it is."

== Home media ==
Released on VHS videotape by Warner Brothers on September 1, 1998.

Warner Archives released the film on made-to-order DVD in the United States as part of "The Bowery Boys, Volume Two" on April 9, 2013.

Preceded by Loose in London; 1953	'The Bowery Boys' movies 1946-1958	Succeeded by Private Eyes; 1953
