= Bernard Gorcey =

American actor (1886–1955)

- Born: Baruch Ugorsky; January 9, 1886; Kovno, Russian Empire
- Died: September 11, 1955 (aged 69); Los Angeles, California, U.S.
- Occupation: Actor
- Spouse: Josephine Condon (m. 1914)
- Children: 4, including Leo Gorcey and David Gorcey

Bernard Gorcey (born Baruch Ugorsky; January 9, 1886 – September 11, 1955) was an American actor. He began in Vaudeville, performed on Broadway, and appeared in multiple shorts and films. He portrayed ice cream shop proprietor Louie Dumbrowski in Monogram Pictures' The Bowery Boys series of B movies, which starred his sons Leo Gorcey and David Gorcey. He also appeared in Charlie Chaplin's 1940 classic The Great Dictator.

== Early life ==
Gorcey was born Baruch Ugorsky in Kovno, Russian Empire (now Kaunas, Lithuania), the son of Abraham and Leah Ugorsky. His father, a tailor, immigrated to New York in March 1888; three years later, the rest of the family followed when Bernard was 5. The family moved to Long Branch, New Jersey in the 1900s and changed the surname to Gorcey. His mother died in 1915.

Gorcey was noticeably short in stature, as an adult having a height of 4 feet 10 inches (1.47 m).

== Career ==
=== Stage ===
Early in his career, Gorcey found success in comedy roles. Between 1907 and 1937 he played in several stage productions, including Tom Jones (1912), What Ails You? (1918), Somebody's Sweetheart (1920) (as "A Mysterious Conspirator"), Always You (1922) (as "Isaac Cohen"), Abie's Irish Rose (1923), Wildflower (1925) (as "Gaston La Roche"), Song of the Flame (1925) (as “Count Boris”), Cherry Blossoms (1930) (as "George Washington Goto"), Pressing Business (1931), Joy of Living (1931), Wonder Boy (1932) (as "Commodore Cohen"), Keeping Expenses Down (1935) (as "Kent J. Goldstein"), Creeping Fire (1935) (as "Mr. Goodman"), and Satellite (1937) (as "Max Goldblatz").

The most successful show of Gorcey’s theatrical career was Abie's Irish Rose.

=== Radio and film ===
He also performed some radio work for the Popeye Show. At 42 years old, he began working in movies. From 1928 until 1955, he appeared in 67 movies, with minor roles with both Monogram and Warner Bros.

Forty-four of these were with sons Leo and David in The East Side Kids and The Bowery Boys film series. Between 1946 and 1955, there were between four and five Bowery Boys movies annually, with Bernard playing the role of Louie Dumbrowski, the owner of a sweet shop where the Bowery Boys would hang out, usually getting free sodas while planning their next escapade, much to Dumbrowski's displeasure. He also appeared as Charlie Chaplin's meek Jewish neighbor Mr. Mann in the film classic The Great Dictator (1940).

== Personal life ==
In 1914, Gorcey married Josephine Condon (1897-1975), from Wales, and had three sons, Fred, Leo, and David, and a daughter, Audrey.

On 31 August 1955, he crashed his car into a bus on 4th and La Brea Avenue in Los Angeles. He died from his injuries on 11 September.

== Filmography ==
Year	Title	Role	Notes
1928	Abie's Irish Rose	Isaac Cohen	
1931	Words & Music	Walter	Short film
1933	Pie a la Mode	Unknown	Short film
1933	Nothing But the Tooth	Unknown	Short film
1934	Syncopated City	Mr. McGillicuddy	Short film
1936	Bulldog Edition	Newsstand Proprietor	
1940	The Great Dictator	Mr. Mann	
1941	So Ends Our Night	Carnival Barker	
1941	Footlight Fever	Shrimp	
1941	Out of the Fog	Sam Pepper	
1941	Ellery Queen and the Perfect Crime	Little Man with Car Tires	
1942	Joan of Paris	Parisian Waiting at Confessional	
1942	Black Dragons	The Cabbie	
1942	A Desperate Chance for Ellery Queen	Man with Tires at Nightclub	
1942	Bowery at Midnight	Shopkeeper	
1943	Clancy Street Boys	Liquor Store Owner	East Side Kids film
1943	A Rookie's Cookie	Unknown	Short film
1943	The Unknown Guest	Messenger with Telegram	
1944	Million Dollar Kid	Courier	East Side Kids film
1944	Follow the Leader	Ginsberg	East Side Kids film
1944	Block Busters	Lippman	East Side Kids film
1944	Bowery Champs	Mr. Johnson	East Side Kids film
1945	I Was a Criminal	Second Railroad Employee	
1945	Docks of New York	Kessel	East Side Kids film
1945	The Picture of Dorian Gray	Stagehand	
1945	Mr. Muggs Rides Again	Meyer	East Side Kids film
1946	Live Wires	Jack Kane	Bowery Boys film
1946	The French Key	Little Man	
1946	In Fast Company	Louie	Bowery Boys film
1946	Bowery Bombshell	Louie Dumbrowski	Bowery Boys film
1946	Spook Busters	Louie	Bowery Boys film
1946	Mr. Hex	Louie	Bowery Boys film
1947	Hard Boiled Mahoney	Louie	Bowery Boys film
1947	News Hounds	Louie Dumbrowski	Bowery Boys film
1947	Bowery Buckaroos	Louie	Bowery Boys film
1947	High Wall	Hirsch	
1947	The Peanut Man	Unknown	
1948	Jinx Money	Louie	Bowery Boys film
1948	No Minor Vices	Mr. Zitzfleisch	
1948	Trouble Makers	Louie Dumbrowski	Bowery Boys film
1949	Fighting Fools	Louie	Bowery Boys film
1949	The Set-Up	Tobacco Man	
1949	Hold That Baby!	Louie	Bowery Boys film
1949	Angels in Disguise	Louie Dumbrowski	Bowery Boys film
1949	The Doctor and the Girl	Patient with Newspaper	
1949	Master Minds	Louie	Bowery Boys film
1950	Blonde Dynamite	Louie Dumbrowski	Bowery Boys film
1950	Lucky Losers	Louie Dumbrowski	Bowery Boys film
1950	Triple Trouble	Louie Dumbrowski	Bowery Boys film
1950	Blues Busters	Louie Dumbrowski	Bowery Boys film
1951	Bowery Battalion	Louie Dumbrowski	Bowery Boys film
1951	Ghost Chasers	Louie Dumbrowski	Bowery Boys film
1951	Pickup	Joe	
1951	Let's Go Navy!	Louie Dumbrowski	Bowery Boys film
1951	Journey Into Light	Flophouse Clerk	
1951	Crazy Over Horses	Louis Xavier 'Louie' Dumbrowski	Bowery Boys film
1951	Chicago Calling	Unknown	
1952	Hold That Line	Louie Dumbrowski / Morris Dumbrowski	Bowery Boys film
1952	Here Come the Marines	Louie Dumbrowski	Bowery Boys film
1952	Feudin' Fools	Louie Dumbrowski	Bowery Boys film
1952	No Holds Barred	Louie Dumbrowski	Bowery Boys film
1953	Jalopy	Louie Dumbrowski	Bowery Boys film
1953	Loose in London	Louie Dumbrowski	Bowery Boys film
1953	Clipped Wings	Louie Dumbrowski	Bowery Boys film
1953	Private Eyes	Louie Dumbrowski	Bowery Boys film
1954	Paris Playboys	Louie Dumbrowski	Bowery Boys film
1954	The Bowery Boys Meet the Monsters	Louie Dumbrowski	Bowery Boys film
1954	Jungle Gents	Louie Dumbrowski	Bowery Boys film
1954	I Married Joan	Joe Perkins/Bailiff/Frisbee/Auction Assistant	7 episodes, TV Series
1955	Bowery to Bagdad	Louie Dumbrowski	Bowery Boys film
1955	High Society	Louie Dumbrowski	Bowery Boys film
1955	Spy Chasers	Louie Dumbrowski	Bowery Boys film
1955	Jail Busters	Louie Dumbrowski	Bowery Boys film; released posthumously
1956	Dig That Uranium	Louie Dumbrowski	Bowery Boys film; final film role, released posthumously
