= Squad Car =

1960 film by Ed Leftwich

- Theatrical release poster
- Directed by: Ed Leftwich
- Screenplay by: Scott Flohr; E.M. Parsons
- Story by: Scott Flohr; E.M. Parsons
- Produced by: Bill Collins; Ed Leftwich
- Starring: Vici Raaf; Paul Bryar; Don Marlowe; Jack Harris; Lynn Moore
- Cinematography: Henry Cronjager Jr.
- Music by: Hall Daniels
- Production companies: Futuramic; Associated Producers Inc.
- Distributed by: 20th Century Fox
- Release date: September 1960
- Running time: 62 minutes
- Country: United States
- Language: English

Squad Car is a 1960 American crime drama film directed by Ed Leftwich and starring Vici Raaf, Paul Bryar, Don Marlowe, Jack Harris, and Lynn Moore. The film was released by 20th Century Fox in September 1960.

== Plot ==
A pilot (Reinhart) who owns his own crop dusting business is hired by a counterfeiter (Stahl) to fly counterfeit money from Mexico to the US. Reinhart's mechanic (Taylor) learns of this and secretly takes some of the money and spends it around town, which alerts the Secret Service. The counterfeiter then kills the mechanic to stop him. The local police investigate the murder and eventually link the murder to the counterfeit ring.

== Cast ==
- Vici Raaf as Cameo Kincaid
- Paul Bryar as Police Lt. Beck (as Paul Byar)
- Don Marlowe as Jay Reinhart
- Jack Harris as Manfred Stahl
- Lynn Moore as Jeanne Haggerty (as Lyn Moore)
- Jimmy Cross as Detective Landis (uncredited)
- Jimmy Dale as Bank Official (uncredited)
- James Hurley as Bartender (uncredited)
- Norman MacDonald as Dell Taylor (uncredited)
- Patsy Schutter as Extra (uncredited)
- Blu Wright as Robert Scalise (uncredited)
- Art Gilmore as Narrator (uncredited)
