= David Gorcey =

American actor (1921–1984)

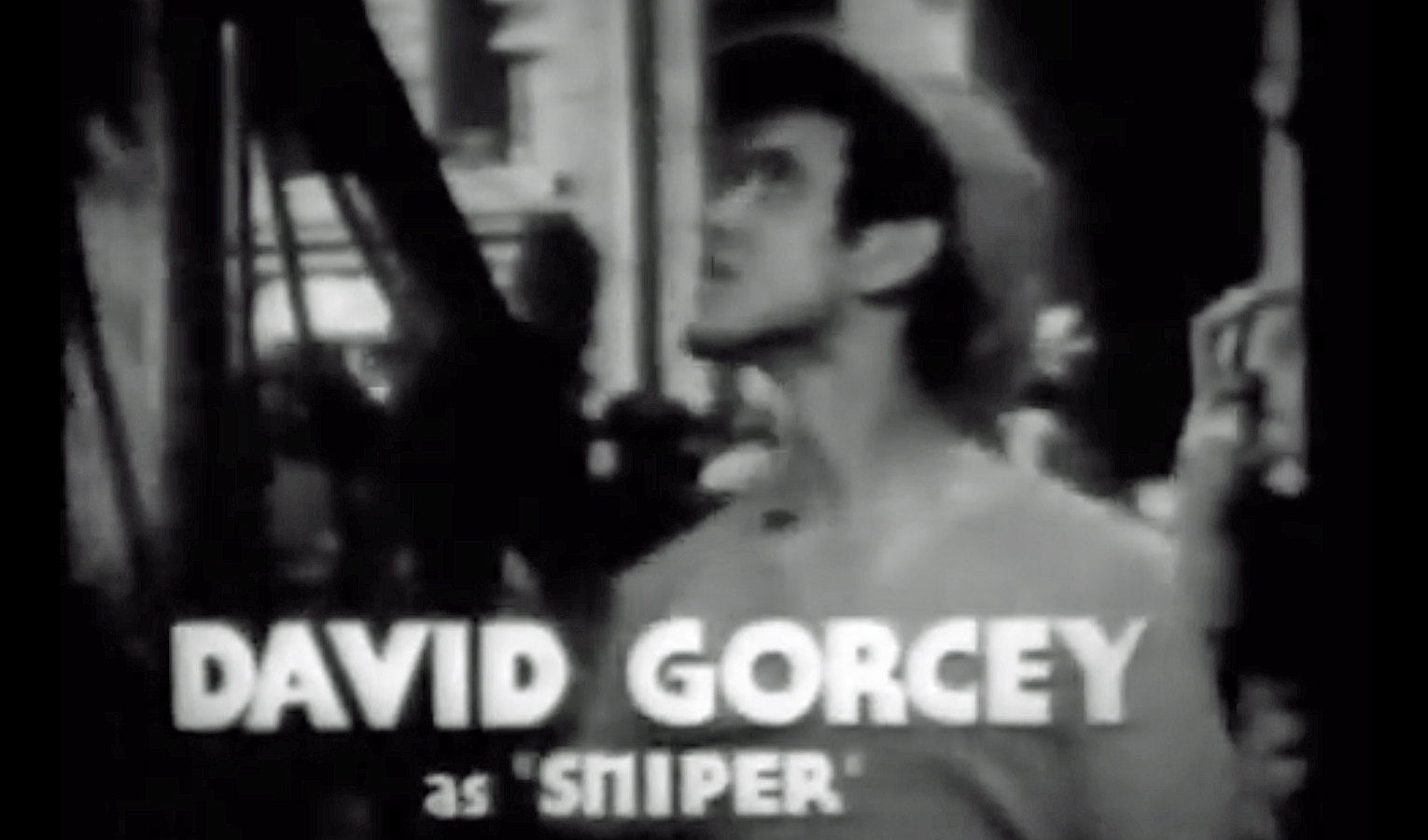
- Gorcey in trailer to "Little Tough Guy" (1938)
- Born: February 6, 1921; Washington Heights, New York, United States
- Died: October 23, 1984 (aged 63); Van Nuys, California, United States
- Burial place: Los Angeles National Cemetery
- Other name: David Condon
- Occupation: Actor
- Years active: 1931-1958
- Spouse: Dorothea Jocker (Aaron) (divorced)
- Children: 1
- Parent(s): Bernard Gorcey; Josephine Condon
- Relatives: Leo Gorcey (brother)

David Gorcey (February 6, 1921 – October 23, 1984) was an American actor and the younger brother of actor Leo Gorcey. Gorcey is best known for portraying "Chuck Anderson" in Monogram Pictures' film series The Bowery Boys, and "Pee Wee" in its antecedent The East Side Kids.

== Life and career ==
David Gorcey was born in Washington Heights, Manhattan, New York, the son of Josephine (née Condon) and Bernard Gorcey. His father was a Russian Jewish immigrant and his mother was an Irish Catholic immigrant. and entered the entertainment business at a young age. He appeared in vaudeville during his childhood, and eventually made it to the stage and screen.

When Gorcey was 10 years old, he was signed by the Vitaphone studio in New York to co-star in its Penrod and Sam series of short subjects, based on the Booth Tarkington stories. "Dave Gorcey" played Sam Williams opposite Billy Hayes as Penrod Schofield.

He is not usually thought of as one of the "original" Dead End Kids, but he did have a small role in the 1935 Broadway production of Sidney Kingsley's Dead End. During his time as a cast member of Dead End, David helped secure a role for his older brother Leo, who ultimately became a star while David remained a supporting character.

Dead End became a hit motion picture, and the street gang of the play became known as the Dead End Kids. When other studios wanted to make their own tough-kid pictures, Leo Gorcey was unavailable and expensive, so younger brother David Gorcey became a more economical second choice. David became a prolific tough-kid juvenile in such films as Juvenile Court (1938), Sergeant Madden (1939), and Carolina Moon (1940). When Universal Pictures launched its Dead End Kids knockoff The Little Tough Guys, David Gorcey was hired. He later joined brother Leo in Monogram Pictures' East Side Kids series.

His screen career was interrupted by military service. During World War II he served in the U.S. Army. Upon his return to civilian life, he was recruited by his brother Leo for Monogram's new series, now called The Bowery Boys. Beginning in 1952 David Gorcey adopted the screen name "David Condon", using his mother's maiden name to avoid accusations of nepotism. He reverted to his real name in 1957. He occasionally appeared apart from the gang, in such films as The Babe Ruth Story (1948), and Abbott and Costello in the Foreign Legion (1950).

== Personal life ==
He was married to Dorothea Jocker (Aaron), with whom he had a son, David Jr.

David Gorcey was always pleasant and professional to his fellow cast and crew members, unlike his brother Leo who was often argumentative and abusive. In 1956, after the death of their father Bernard Gorcey, David visited Leo's home, only to find Leo in a drunken rampage. Leo threatened David with a gun, causing the appalled David to leave both the premises and Leo behind. He reluctantly became estranged from Leo.

Later in life, he became a minister ("Father David") and founded a halfway house to help recovering alcoholics and people with substance abuse problems. He died in Van Nuys, California on October 23, 1984, of complications of diabetes.

== Filmography ==
=== Film ===
- Little Tough Guy (1938) as 'Sniper'
- Personal Secretary (1938) as Newsboy (uncredited)
- Juvenile Court (1938) as Pighead
- Prairie Moon (1938) as Hector Slick Barton
- Little Tough Guys in Society (1938) as Yap
- Newsboys' Home (1938) as Yap
- Off the Record (1939) as Reform School Inmate (uncredited)
- Sergeant Madden (1939) as Punchy LePage
- Code of the Streets (1939) as Yap
- Call a Messenger (1939) as Yap
- You're Not So Tough (1940) as First Worker (uncredited)
- Boys of the City (1940) as Pete
- City for Conquest (1940) as Ticket Taker (uncredited)
- That Gang of Mine (1940) as Peewee
- Pride of the Bowery (1940) as Peewee
- Flying Wild (1941) as Peewee
- Bowery Blitzkrieg (1941) as Peewee
- Spooks Run Wild (1941) as Peewee
- Blues in the Night (1941) as Jitterbug (uncredited)
- Tuxedo Junction (1941) as Migrant Boy (uncredited)
- Jail House Blues (1942) as Bellboy (uncredited)
- Mr. Wise Guy (1942) as Peewee
- Junior G-Men of the Air (1942, Serial) as Double Face Gordon
- Let's Get Tough! (1942) as Peewee
- Smart Alecks (1942) as Peewee
- The French Key (1946) as Eddie Miller
- In Fast Company (1946) as Chuck
- Bowery Bombshell (1946) as Chuck
- Spook Busters (1946) as Chuck
- Mr. Hex (1946) as Chuck
- Hard Boiled Mahoney (1947) as Chuck
- News Hounds (1947) as Chuck
- Bowery Buckaroos (1947) as Chuck
- Killer McCoy (1947) as Joe (uncredited)
- Angels' Alley (1948) as Chuck
- Jinx Money (1948) as Chuck
- The Babe Ruth Story (1948) as Newsboy (uncredited)
- Smugglers' Cove (1948) as Chuck
- Trouble Makers (1948) as Chuck
- Fighting Fools (1949) as Chuck
- Hold That Baby! (1949) as Chuck
- She Shoulda Said No! (1949) as Ricky
- Angels in Disguise (1949) as Chuck
- Master Minds (1949) as Chuck
- Blonde Dynamite (1950) as Chuck, aka Sir Cedric
- Lucky Losers (1950) as Chuck
- Abbott and Costello in the Foreign Legion (1950) as Newsboy (uncredited)
- Triple Trouble (1950) as Chuck
- Blues Busters (1950) as Chuck
- Bowery Battalion (1951) as Chuck
- Ghost Chasers (1951) as Chuck
- Let's Go Navy! (1951) as Chuck
- Crazy Over Horses (1951) as Chuck
- Hold That Line (1952) as Chuck
- Here Come the Marines (1952) as Chuck
- Feudin' Fools (1952) as Chuck
- No Holds Barred (1952) as Chuck
- Jalopy (1953) as Chuck
- Loose in London (1953) as Chuck
- Clipped Wings (1953) as Chuck
- Private Eyes (1953) as Chuck
- Paris Playboys (1954) as Chuck
- The Bowery Boys Meet the Monsters (1954) as Chuck
- Jungle Gents (1954) as Chuck
- Bowery to Bagdad (1955) as Chuck
- High Society (1955) as Chuck
- Spy Chasers (1955) as Chuck
- Jail Busters (1955) as Charles 'Chuck' Anderson
- Dig That Uranium (1955) as Chuck
- Crashing Las Vegas (1956) as Chuck
- Fighting Trouble (1956) as Chuck
- Hot Shots (1956) as Chuck
- Hold That Hypnotist (1957) as Chuck
- Spook Chasers (1957) as Chuck
- Looking for Danger (1957) as Chuck
- Up in Smoke (1957) as Chuck
- In the Money (1958) as Chuck
- Cole Younger, Gunfighter (1958) as Second Man (uncredited) (final film role)

=== Television ===
| Year | Series | Role | Notes |
|---|---|---|---|
| 1957 | The Silent Service | Talker | Episode: "Hit 'Em Again, Harder" |
| 1958 | M Squad | Telegraph Agent | Episode: "The Long Ride" |
