= Leo Gorcey =

American actor (1917–1969)

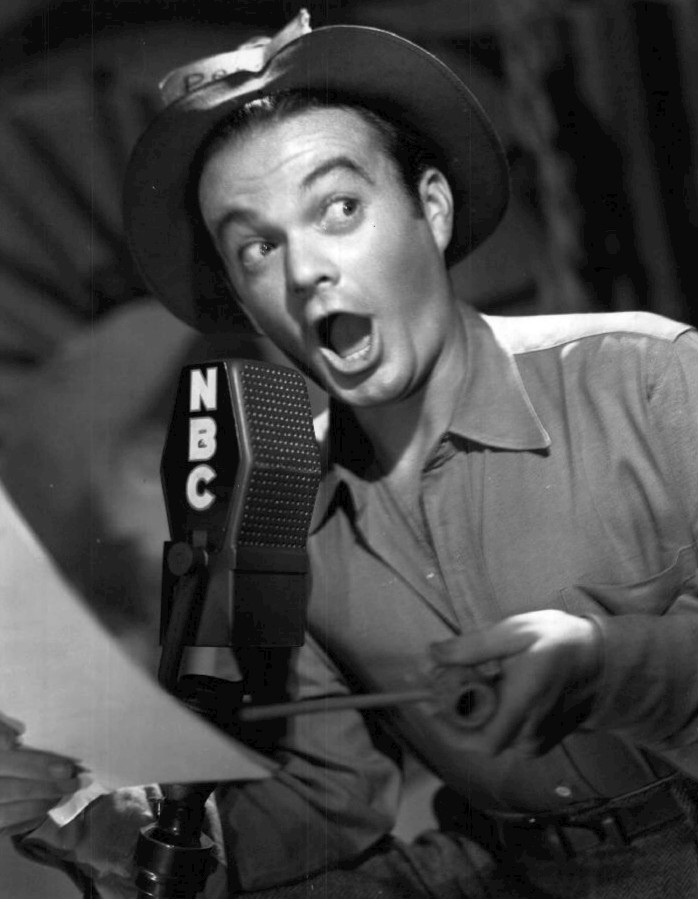
- Gorcey in 1945
- Born: Leo Bernard Gorcey; June 3, 1917; New York City, U.S.
- Died: June 2, 1969 (aged 51); Oakland, California, U.S.
- Occupation: Actor
- Years active: 1935–1969
- Spouses: Kay Marvis (m. 1939; div. 1944) Evalene Bankston (m. 1945; div. 1948) Amelita Ward (m. 1949; div. 1956) Brandy Davis (m. 1956; div. 1962) Mary Gannon (m. 1968)
- Children: 3
- Parent(s): Bernard Gorcey; Josephine Condon
- Relatives: David Gorcey (brother)

Leo Bernard Gorcey (June 3, 1917– June 2, 1969) was an American stage and film actor, famous for portraying the leader of a group of street-wise city toughs known variously as the Dead End Kids, the East Side Kids, and as adults, The Bowery Boys. Gorcey was famous for his use of malapropisms, such as "I depreciate it!" instead of "I appreciate it!"

== Early years ==
Gorcey was born in New York City on June 3, 1917, the son of Josephine (née Condon), an Irish Catholic immigrant, and Bernard Gorcey, a Russian Jewish immigrant. Both were vaudevillian actors of short stature. Bernard Gorcey was 4 ft 10 in (1.47 m) and his wife was 4 ft 11 in (1.50 m). Their son reached 5 ft 6 in (1.68 m) in adulthood.

== Film career ==
In the 1930s, Gorcey's father lived apart from the family while working in theater and film. When he returned in 1935, Leo's younger brother David Gorcey and he persuaded Leo to audition for a small part in the play Dead End. Leo had just lost a job as a plumber's apprentice and wished to emulate his father's modest success. The Gorcey boys were cast in small roles as two members of the East 53rd Place Gang (originally dubbed the "2nd Avenue Boys") in the play Dead End by Sidney Kingsley. Charles Duncan, originally cast as Spit, left the play, and Gorcey, his understudy, was promoted. Gorcey created the stage persona of a quarrelsome guttersnipe whose greatest joy was to make trouble.

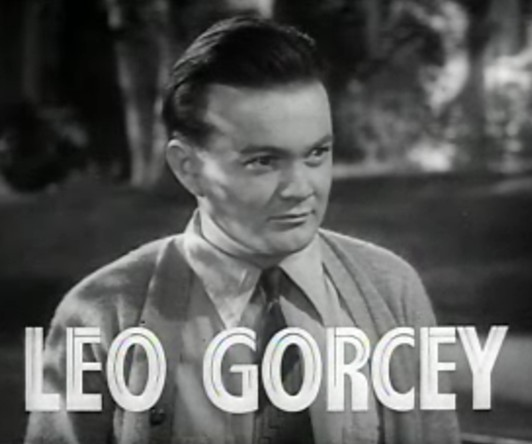
Gorcey in the film Gallant Sons (1940)

In 1937, Samuel Goldwyn made the popular play into a film of the same name, and transported the six rowdy young men to Hollywood. Gorcey became one of the busiest actors in Hollywood during the following 20 years, starring in seven Dead End Kids films between 1937 and 1939, 21 East Side Kids films between 1940 and 1945, and 41 The Bowery Boys films between 1946 and 1955.

The earlier films presented Gorcey in variations of his Dead End character Spit, a sneering tough guy meeting anyone's challenge with a wisecracking remark. In the early 1940s, as the dramatic films shifted to roughneck comedy, Gorcey embellished his dialogue with malapropisms, always delivered in a thick Brooklyn accent. "A clever deduction" would be mangled by Gorcey as "a clever seduction"; "I reiterate" became "I regurgitate"; "optical illusion" came across as "optical delusion"; and "I should see an optometrist" was rendered as "I should see an ichthyologist." A studio press release reported that Gorcey spent 30 minutes a day studying a dictionary: "He has made something of a career for himself as an actor by the use of words no one else has ever heard of, and by the misuse or mispronunciation of others."

In 1944, Gorcey took a recurring role on the Pabst Blue Ribbon Town radio show, starring Groucho Marx. He also had a small role in a 1948 film, the comedy So This Is New York, starring radio comedians Henry Morgan and Arnold Stang, which was Gorcey's last appearance as a straight character actor.

In 1945, Sam Katzman, producer of the East Side Kids series, flatly refused to meet Gorcey's demand of double his usual salary. Gorcey walked out on Katzman, and Katzman discontinued the series. Gorcey turned to Dead End teammate Bobby Jordan, who suggested a meeting with Jordan's agent, Jan Grippo. The series became The Bowery Boys, with Gorcey holding a 40% financial share, and Grippo as producer. Gorcey brought aboard his father, Bernard Gorcey, to appear as Louie Dumbrowski, the panicky owner of a sweet shop where the boys gathered, as well as his brother David to play one of the gang members.

The series was immediately successful, and Gorcey starred in four Bowery Boys films per year through 1955. That year, his father died as a result of injuries from an automobile accident. Gorcey, devastated, began abusing alcohol and lost a great deal of weight. When he allegedly trashed a film set in an intoxicated rage (an occurrence which was later vehemently denied in the 1980s by both Huntz Hall and David Gorcey), the studio refused to grant him a pay raise that he had demanded, so he parted ways with the Bowery Boys and was replaced in the last seven films by Stanley Clements. However, Gorcey's brother David remained with the series until it ended in late 1957.

During the 1960s, Gorcey did very little acting. He had a bit part in the 1963 comedy It's a Mad, Mad, Mad, Mad World, and he appeared with old sidekick Huntz Hall in a pair of low-budget films, Second Fiddle to a Steel Guitar in 1966 and The Phynx, released in 1970 after his death. Gorcey also made an appearance in a television commercial for a 1969 Pontiac model.

== Autobiography ==
In 1967, Gorcey self-published an autobiography, An Original Dead-End Kid Presents: Dead End Yells, Wedding Bells, Cockle Shells, and Dizzy Spells, which was limited to 1,000 copies. It was reprinted in 2004.

== Personal life ==
In May 1939, Gorcey married 15-year-old dancer Kay Marvis, who appeared in four of his Monogram movies. They divorced in 1944, and the following year, Marvis became the second wife of Groucho Marx.

Gorcey married actress Evalene Bankston in October 1945, but they divorced two years later. He was arrested for firing a gun at his wife when she entered his home in Van Nuys, California, but was acquitted of the charge in 1948.

In February 1949, Gorcey married actress Amelita Ward, with whom he had appeared in Clancy Street Boys and Smugglers' Cove. The marriage produced two children, including Leo Gorcey, Jr., but the couple were divorced in February 1956. Later that year, Gorcey married Brandy Davis. They had a daughter, Brandy Gorcey Ziesemer, but divorced in 1962. Gorcey was married to Mary Gannon on July 12, 1968, until his death, nearly one year later.

== Death ==
Gorcey, a lifelong alcoholic, died of liver failure on June 2, 1969, one day short of his 52nd birthday. He is buried at Molinos Cemetery in Los Molinos, California.

== Legacy ==
In 1967, Gorcey's image was to appear in the crowd of celebrities on the cover of the Beatles' album Sgt. Pepper's Lonely Hearts Club Band, but because he requested a fee, he was removed.

Me and the Dead End Kid, a book about Gorcey written by his son Leo, Jr., was published in 2003. In 2017, a third book on his life appeared, Leo Gorcey's Fractured World by Jim Manago, which included an examination of Gorcey's use of malapropisms in the Bowery Boys films. Also in 2017, Richard Roat, known for having the largest collection of Dead End Kids/Little Tough Guys/East Side Kids/Bowery Boys memorabilia in the United States, published the book, Hollywood's Made-to-Order Punks: The Dead End Kids, Little Tough Guys, East Side Kids and the Bowery Boys , complete with photographs, behind-the-scenes trivia, and interviews with the surviving Dead End Kids/Little Tough Guys/East Side Kids/Bowery Boys that he had collected since the 1980s.

== Filmography ==
=== Film ===
| Year | Film | Role | Notes |
|---|---|---|---|
| 1937 | Dead End | Spit | Dead End Kids film |
| 1937 | Portia on Trial | Joe Gannow | |
| 1937 | Headin' East | Boy boxer in gym | Uncredited |
| 1937 | Mannequin | Clifford | |
| 1938 | The Beloved Brat | Spike Matz | |
| 1938 | Crime School | Spike | Dead End Kids film |
| 1938 | Angels with Dirty Faces | Bim | Dead End Kids film |
| 1938 | Swingtime in the Movies | Himself | Dead End Kids film / Short / Uncredited |
| 1939 | They Made Me a Criminal | Spit | Dead End Kids film |
| 1939 | Hell's Kitchen | Gyp Haller | Dead End Kids film |
| 1939 | The Angels Wash Their Faces | Leo Finnegan | Dead End Kids film |
| 1939 | On Dress Parade | Slip Duncan | Dead End Kids film |
| 1939 | Private Detective | Newsboy | Uncredited |
| 1939 | Invisible Stripes | Jimmy | |
| 1940 | Boys of the City | Muggs McGinnis | East Side Kids film |
| 1940 | That Gang of Mine | Muggs Malone | East Side Kids film |
| 1940 | Hullabaloo | Apartment house bellhop | Uncredited |
| 1940 | Gallant Sons | "Doc" Reardon | |
| 1940 | Pride of the Bowery | Muggs McGinnis | East Side Kids film |
| 1941 | Road to Zanzibar | Boy | |
| 1941 | Flying Wild | Muggs | East Side Kids film |
| 1941 | Angels with Broken Wings | Punchy Dorsey | |
| 1941 | Out of the Fog | Eddie | |
| 1941 | Bowery Blitzkrieg | Muggs | East Side Kids film |
| 1941 | Down in San Diego | Snap Collins | |
| 1942 | Spooks Run Wild | Muggs | East Side Kids film |
| 1942 | Born to Sing | Snap Collins | |
| 1942 | Mr. Wise Guy | Muggs McGinnis | East Side Kids film |
| 1942 | Sunday Punch | Biff | |
| 1942 | Let's Get Tough! | Muggs McGinnis | East Side Kids film |
| 1942 | Maisie Gets Her Man | Cecil | |
| 1942 | Smart Alecks | Muggs McGinnis | East Side Kids film |
| 1942 | 'Neath Brooklyn Bridge | Muggs McGinnis | East Side Kids film |
| 1943 | Kid Dynamite | Muggs McGinnis | East Side Kids film |
| 1943 | Clancy Street Boys | Muggs McGinnis | East Side Kids film |
| 1943 | Ghosts on the Loose | Muggs McGinnis | East Side Kids film |
| 1943 | Destroyer | Sarecky | |
| 1943 | Mr. Muggs Steps Out | Muggs McGinnis | East Side Kids film |
| 1944 | Million Dollar Kid | Muggs McGinnis | East Side Kids film |
| 1944 | Follow the Leader | Muggs McGinnis | East Side Kids film |
| 1944 | Block Busters | Muggs McGinnis | East Side Kids film |
| 1944 | Bowery Champs | Muggs McGinnis | East Side Kids film |
| 1945 | Docks of New York | Muggs McGinnis | East Side Kids film |
| 1945 | Mr. Muggs Rides Again | Muggs McGinnis | East Side Kids film |
| 1945 | Midnight Manhunt | Clutch Tracy | |
| 1945 | Come Out Fighting | Muggs McGinnis | East Side Kids film |
| 1946 | Live Wires | Slip Mahoney | Bowery Boys film |
| 1946 | In Fast Company | Slip Mahoney | Bowery Boys film |
| 1946 | Bowery Bombshell | Slip Mahoney | Bowery Boys film |
| 1946 | Spook Busters | Slip Mahoney | Bowery Boys film |
| 1946 | Mr. Hex | Slip Mahoney | Bowery Boys film |
| 1947 | Hard Boiled Mahoney | Slip Mahoney | Bowery Boys film |
| 1947 | News Hounds | Slip Mahoney | Bowery Boys film |
| 1947 | Bowery Buckaroos | Slip Mahoney (aka:"Dead-Eye" Dan McGurk) | Bowery Boys film |
| 1948 | Angels' Alley | Slip Mahoney | Bowery Boys film |
| 1948 | So This Is New York | Sid Mercer | |
| 1948 | Jinx Money | Slip Mahoney | Bowery Boys film |
| 1948 | Smugglers' Cove | Slip Mahoney | Bowery Boys film |
| 1948 | Trouble Makers | Slip Mahoney | Bowery Boys film |
| 1949 | Fighting Fools | Slip Mahoney | Bowery Boys film |
| 1949 | Hold That Baby! | Slip Mahoney | Bowery Boys film |
| 1949 | Angels in Disguise | Slip Mahoney | Bowery Boys film |
| 1949 | Master Minds | Slip Mahoney | Bowery Boys film |
| 1950 | Blonde Dynamite | Slip Mahoney | Bowery Boys film |
| 1950 | Lucky Losers | Slip Mahoney | Bowery Boys film |
| 1950 | Triple Trouble | Slip Mahoney | Bowery Boys film |
| 1950 | Blues Busters | Slip Mahoney | Bowery Boys film |
| 1951 | Bowery Battalion | Slip Mahoney | Bowery Boys film |
| 1951 | Ghost Chasers | Slip Mahoney | Bowery Boys film |
| 1951 | Let's Go Navy! | Slip Mahoney | Bowery Boys film |
| 1951 | Crazy Over Horses | Slip Mahoney | Bowery Boys film |
| 1952 | Hold That Line | Slip Mahoney | Bowery Boys film |
| 1952 | Here Come the Marines | Slip Mahoney | Bowery Boys film |
| 1952 | Feudin' Fools | Slip Mahoney | Bowery Boys film |
| 1952 | No Holds Barred | Slip Mahoney | Bowery Boys film |
| 1953 | Jalopy | Slip Mahoney | Bowery Boys film |
| 1953 | Loose in London | Slip Mahoney | Bowery Boys film |
| 1953 | Clipped Wings | Slip Mahoney | Bowery Boys film |
| 1953 | Private Eyes | Slip Mahoney | Bowery Boys film |
| 1954 | Paris Playboys | Slip Mahoney | Bowery Boys film |
| 1954 | The Bowery Boys Meet the Monsters | Slip Mahoney | Bowery Boys film |
| 1954 | Jungle Gents | Slip Mahoney | Bowery Boys film |
| 1955 | Bowery to Bagdad | Slip Mahoney | Bowery Boys film |
| 1955 | High Society | Slip Mahoney | Bowery Boys film |
| 1955 | Spy Chasers | Slip Mahoney | Bowery Boys film |
| 1955 | Jail Busters | Slip Mahoney | Bowery Boys film |
| 1955 | Dig That Uranium | Slip Mahoney | Bowery Boys film |
| 1956 | Crashing Las Vegas | Slip Mahoney | Bowery Boys film |
| 1963 | It's a Mad, Mad, Mad, Mad World | First cab driver | Cameo |
| 1965 | Second Fiddle to a Steel Guitar | Leo | |
| 1970 | The Phynx | Himself | Final film role |

=== Television ===
| Year | Series | Role | Notes |
|---|---|---|---|
| 1962 | The Dick Powell Theatre | Billy Vale | Episode: "No Strings Attached" |
| 1962 | Mr. Smith Goes to Washington | Windy | Episode: "...But What Are You Doing for Your Country?" |
