= The Bowery Boys =

Fictional New York City characters

Comedy career
- Medium: Repertory theatre, film
- Genres: Farce, comedy
- Subject: New York City-based storylines
- Former members: Leo Gorcey (1946-1956); Huntz Hall (1946-1957); Bobby Jordan (1946-1947); Gabriel Dell (1946-1950); Billy Benedict (1946-1951); David Gorcey (1946-1957); Bennie Bartlett (1948-1949, 1951-1955); Buddy Gorman (1950-1951); Stanley Clements (1956-1957)

The Bowery Boys are fictional New York City characters portrayed by an ensemble of actors, who were the subject of 48 feature films released quarterly by Monogram Pictures and its successor Allied Artists Pictures Corporation from January 1946 through January 1958.

The Bowery Boys were successors of The East Side Kids, which had been a Monogram series since 1940. The group originated as The Dead End Kids, who originally appeared in the 1937 film Dead End.

== Origins ==
=== The Dead End Kids ===
The Dead End Kids originally appeared in the 1935 play Dead End, dramatized by Sidney Kingsley. When Samuel Goldwyn turned the play into a 1937 film, he hired the original "kids" from the play—Leo Gorcey, Huntz Hall, Bobby Jordan, Gabriel Dell, Billy Halop, and Bernard Punsly—to appear in the same roles in the film. This led to the making of six other films that shared the collective title The Dead End Kids.

=== The Little Tough Guys ===
In 1938, Universal launched its own tough-kid series, Little Tough Guys. Gradually, Universal recruited most of the original Dead End Kids, so the series ultimately featured the "Dead End Kids and Little Tough Guys." Universal made 12 feature films and three 12-chapter serials with the gang. The final film in Universal's series, Keep 'Em Slugging, was released in 1943, with Bobby Jordan replacing erstwhile ringleader Billy Halop, and Norman Abbott replacing Bernard Punsly.

=== The East Side Kids ===
Independent producer Sam Katzman cashed in on the Dead End Kids' popularity by producing a low-budget imitation, East Side Kids (1940), with six juvenile actors, including Hally Chester, who had appeared with individual Dead Enders in various films, and former Our Gang kid Donald Haines. The film was released by Monogram Pictures. When Bobby Jordan and Leo Gorcey became available in 1940, Katzman signed them, and the East Side Kids became a Monogram series. Katzman also signed Leo's brother David Gorcey and "Sunshine Sammy" Morrison, another Our Gang alumnus. Original Dead End Kids Huntz Hall and Gabriel Dell followed Jordan and Gorcey to Monogram, as did freelance juvenile Billy Benedict of the Little Tough Guys.

The original Dead End Kids were now working at two different studios, so the East Side Kids were made at the same time that Universal was making the Dead End Kids and Little Tough Guys series. In total, 22 East Side Kids films were made, with the final one, Come Out Fighting, released in 1945.

== The Bowery Boys ==
In 1945, when East Side Kids producer Katzman refused to grant Leo Gorcey's request to double his weekly salary, Gorcey quit the series, which then ended immediately. Bobby Jordan then suggested a meeting with his agent, Jan Grippo. Grippo, Gorcey, and Hall formed Jan Grippo Productions, revamped the format, and rechristened the series The Bowery Boys. (The earlier films' credits appear as Leo Gorcey and the Bowery Boys.) Gorcey, who owned 40% of the company, starred in and co-produced the films, and contributed to the scripts. The new series followed a more established formula than the prior incarnations of the team, with the gang usually hanging out at Louie's Sweet Shop (at 3rd and Canal St.) until an adventure came along.

The original main characters were Terrence Aloysius "Slip" Mahoney (Leo Gorcey), Horace Debussy "Sach" Jones (Huntz Hall), Bobby (Bobby Jordan), Whitey (Billy Benedict), and Homer (William Frambes). Homer was replaced after the first film by Chuck (David Gorcey, sometimes billed as David Condon). In 1948, Bobby was replaced by Butch Williams, with former East Side Kids Bennie Bartlett and Buddy Gorman alternating in the role. The proprietor of the sweet shop where they hung out was the panicky Louie Dumbrowski (Bernard Gorcey, Leo and David's real-life father).

Like the previous incarnations of the team, the members went through a number of changes over the course of the series. Thirteen actors were members of the team at one time or another. Ernie "Sunshine Sammy" Morrison, "Scruno" in the East Side Kids films, declined an invitation to rejoin the gang. (He later stated in an interview that he "didn't like the setup," possibly referring to the idea of Gorcey and Hall being in the forefront, and being paid much more than the other members.) Bobby Jordan was also unhappy with the direction of the series, which favored Gorcey and Hall and limited the salaries and the participation of the other gang members. He left the series after being injured in an elevator accident.

Gabriel Dell returned in the fourth entry, Spook Busters (1946), as Gabe Moreno, a former member of the gang just out of the Navy with a French war bride in tow. He remained (minus spouse) for the next 16 features. Gabe was a convenient "utility" character, frequently changing jobs (attorney, policeman, song plugger, reporter, television personality) to suit the story at hand, and the limited casting budget. Dell often acted as a bridge between the real world and the Bowery gang he would summon to assist him. He reprised one of his East Side Kids roles in Hard Boiled Mahoney (1947), playing a myopic nerd with thick glasses, ascot, and cap. His final appearance was in Blues Busters in 1950, generally regarded as one of the funniest in the series.

The early films such as In Fast Company (1946) flirted with the same humor-laced crime drama of the previous series, but they gradually shifted to situation comedy (Western comedy, prison comedy, military comedy, college comedy, hillbilly comedy, etc.). In 1953, a new producer, Ben Schwalb, hired director Edward Bernds and writer Elwood Ullman, both closely associated with the Three Stooges. The situation-comedy content immediately gave way to all-out slapstick, in the Three Stooges manner using many of the Stooges' gags, and the stories became more juvenile. The new approach literally paid off: "The Bowery Boys Meet the Monsters was the best moneymaker of all of them," Bernds told historian Ted Okuda in 1987. "Actually, every Bowery Boys picture made money. Even if it was a bad one, it didn't lose. The Bowery Boys Meet the Monsters stood out above the others in terms of profit." Bernds left the series after Dig That Uranium (1956), although an unused Bernds-Ullman script was filmed later as Looking for Danger (1957).

Production costs kept rising during the 1950s but the budgets of the films remained the same. This was a common studio practice for a "B" series, as typified by the Laurel and Hardy features of the 1940s. Author Scott MacGillivray explains: "[Each film] was rented to theaters for a fixed fee, so its earning potential was relatively limited. It didn't make sense for the studios to spend any extra money on a product that wouldn't bring in any extra money. The pictures were guaranteed hits already. Why raise the budgets and cut into the profit margin?" The 1950s dollar didn't buy as much as before, so the studio had to economize. A Bowery Boys comedy that had formerly been filmed in 10 or 11 days (a speedy schedule to begin with) was now being filmed in five or six days. Cheaper films meant cheaper talent; the Monogram films had featured impressive casts of "name" supporting actors, but by the mid-1950s, Allied Artists would hire only one or two veteran featured players per film (Eric Blore, Lyle Talbot, Lloyd Corrigan, Addison Richards, Barton MacLane, Fritz Feld, Raymond Hatton, Mary Beth Hughes, Byron Foulger, Paul Cavanagh, etc.) and fill out the cast with lesser-known actors.

Gorcey had been drinking heavily during the filming of Dig That Uranium (1955), according to Edward Bernds. After filming was completed, Bernard Gorcey was killed in an automobile accident, devastating his son Leo, whose drinking became even heavier. It visibly affected his performance in the next picture, Crashing Las Vegas (1956). Director Jean Yarbrough recalled that Gorcey became violently unhinged during filming, trashing the set and destroying every prop in sight (though this was vehemently denied in the 1980s by both David Gorcey, who called the story "pure shit", and Huntz Hall, who became visibly upset when asked about the incident and called the allegation "a fucking lie!") At a subsequent meeting with Allied Artists executives, Gorcey demanded an increase on the 40% interest he held in the series. This was denied, and after a heated exchange, he stormed off the studio lot. Gorcey claimed to have quit, but Edward Bernds offered an opinion from behind the scenes: "He was even worse on Crashing Las Vegas than he was on Dig That Uranium, and I believe Ben [Schwalb] went to [studio executive] Walter Mirisch and said, 'It won't work; he's impossible and if we're going to continue this series we've got to do it with somebody else'... No, Leo was fired -- he drank too much and he couldn't do his work anymore."

The studio owed exhibitors three more films for the 1956 season, so producer Schwalb recruited Stanley Clements, a former tough-teen actor who had starred in Schwalb's action pictures of the early 1950s, as Gorcey's replacement. Clements, as Duke Coveleskie, adapted to the series easily and completed the three films, which now starred "Huntz Hall and the Bowery Boys." These new films reunited Hall with former colleagues Adele Jergens, Joe Downing, Dick Elliott, Byron Foulger, and Fritz Feld.

With Louie absent, the gang's new hangout was a rooming house, where they helped landlady Kate Kelly (played first by Doris Kemper, then by Queenie Smith). The new Hall-Clements partnership was successful enough to be renewed for the 1957 season, and four more films were made with 25-year-old television actor Eddie LeRoy joining the cast as the bespectacled Blinky. The gang returned to the sweet shop, now known as Clancy's Cafe, with its similarly put-upon proprietor Mike Clancy (played first by Percy Helton, then by Dick Elliott).

== Transition from theaters to television ==
The studio had been releasing the Bowery Boys comedies to theaters every three months since 1946, and by 1957, they had become a predictable and successful attraction. The series ended suddenly when Allied Artists decided that the films would be even more valuable on television. Producer Ben Schwalb moved on to other projects at Allied Artists, but Huntz Hall still had two films left on his contract. Former film editor and now staff producer Richard Heermance was assigned to oversee these last two films, Up in Smoke (1957) and In the Money (filmed 1957, released January 1958). William Beaudine — who had been the Bowery Boys' most frequent director — came back to conclude the series. After filming ended in September 1957, the studio demolished the long-standing "Bowery street" on the backlot, replacing it with a western street. In October 1957 Allied Artists advertised that Huntz Hall and the Bowery Boys would be returning for another year with "four comedy riots: the screen's top fun series!", but the announcement was premature; the series had already ceased production.

Allied Artists moved ahead with its plans to syndicate The Bowery Boys to television. Jan Grippo, who had produced the series from 1946 to 1951, still held a 50-percent interest in his 23 productions, so Allied Artists bought the rights from Grippo in December 1957. The transaction was front-page news in the trade, and the amount was reported as "more than $500,000." Preparing the series for television required making new negatives for 16mm film prints, and then making a complete set of 48 new prints for each local market. With so many films in the series, and so many TV stations buying a complete set, this took time. The Bowery Boys finally entered TV syndication in 1960. The films became a staple for independent stations across America, often used to fill the early-afternoon time slots on weekends, much as the same films played at matinées in theaters.

There was still a demand for the Bowery Boys comedies in theaters; they were useful fillers on double-feature programs and kiddie matinées, and drive-ins used them extensively. Allied Artists had been offering a backlog of Bowery Boys titles all along, reminding exhibitors that older titles were still available from local exchanges. After the series concluded with In the Money, Allied Artists began a formal reissue program, continuing to release the films on its usual seasonal schedule as though the series hadn't stopped. The first of the reissues was Blues Busters (1950), which returned to theaters in 1958. Theaters continued to play Bowery Boys features for another 10 years.

== Legacy ==
The Bowery Boys (48 titles) was the third-longest feature-film series of American origin in motion-picture history (behind the Charles Starrett westerns at 131 titles, and the Hopalong Cassidy westerns at 66). Only Huntz Hall and David Gorcey had remained with the series since 1946.

== List of the Bowery Boys ==
Actor	Character	Years active
Leo Gorcey	Terrance Aloysius "Slip" Mahoney	1946–1956
Huntz Hall	Horace DeBussy "Sach" Jones	1946–1957
Bobby Jordan	Bobby	1946–1947
Gabriel Dell	Gabe Moreno	1946–1950
William "Billy" Benedict	Whitmore "Whitey" Williams	1946–1951
David Gorcey	Charles "Chuck" Anderson	1946–1957
Bennie Bartlett	Bartholomew "Butch" Williams	1948–1949, 1951–1955
Buddy Gorman	Butch	1950–1951 temporarily replacing Bartlett (also various minor roles, 1946–1949)
William Frambes	Homer	1946
Gil Stratton, Jr.	Junior	1952, temporarily replacing Billy Benedict
Jimmy Murphy	Myron	1956–1957, replacing Bennie Bartlett
Stanley Clements	Stanislaus "Duke" Coveleskie	1956–1957, replacing Leo Gorcey
Danny Welton	Danny	1956, temporarily replacing Jimmy Murphy
Eddie LeRoy	Blinky	1957

=== Other recurring players ===
Actor	Character	Years active
Bernard Gorcey	Louie Dumbrowski (1946-1955); Jack Kane (one film only, 1946)	1946-1955
Doris Kemper	Mrs. Kate Kelly	1956
Queenie Smith	Mrs. Kate Kelly	1956–1957
Percy Helton	Mike Clancy	1957
Dick Elliott	Mike Clancy	1957

== Filmography ==
Year	Title	Notes
1946	Live Wires	Leo Gorcey, Huntz Hall, Bobby Jordan, Billy Benedict, William Frambes
1946	In Fast Company	David Gorcey replaces William Frambes
1946	Bowery Bombshell	
1946	Spook Busters	First film with Gabriel Dell
1946	Mr. Hex	
1947	Hard Boiled Mahoney	
1947	News Hounds	
1947	Bowery Buckaroos	Last film with Bobby Jordan
1948	Angels' Alley	
1948	Jinx Money	Bennie Bartlett replaces Bobby Jordan
1948	Smugglers' Cove	
1948	Trouble Makers	
1949	Fighting Fools	
1949	Hold That Baby!	
1949	Angels in Disguise	
1949	Master Minds	
1950	Blonde Dynamite	Buddy Gorman replaces Bennie Bartlett
1950	Lucky Losers	
1950	Triple Trouble	
1950	Blues Busters	Last film with Gabriel Dell, who is not replaced
1951	Bowery Battalion	
1951	Ghost Chasers	
1951	Let's Go Navy!	Last film with Buddy Gorman
1951	Crazy Over Horses	Last film with Billy Benedict; David Gorcey becomes David Condon; Bennie Bartlett replaces Buddy Gorman
1952	Hold That Line	Gil Stratton, Jr. replaces Billy Benedict
1952	Here Come the Marines	Last film with Gil Stratton, Jr., who is not replaced
1952	Feudin' Fools	Gang becomes standardized: Leo Gorcey, Huntz Hall, David Condon, Bennie Bartlett
1952	No Holds Barred	
1953	Jalopy	
1953	Loose in London	
1953	Clipped Wings	
1953	Private Eyes	
1954	Paris Playboys	
1954	The Bowery Boys Meet the Monsters	
1954	Jungle Gents	
1955	Bowery to Bagdad	
1955	High Society	
1955	Spy Chasers	
1955	Jail Busters	
1956	Dig That Uranium	Last film with Bernard Gorcey; last film with Bennie Bartlett
1956	Crashing Las Vegas	Last film with Leo Gorcey; Jimmy Murphy replaces Bennie Bartlett; Doris Kemper replaces Bernard Gorcey
1956	Fighting Trouble	First film with Stanley Clements; Danny Welton replaces Jimmy Murphy; Queenie Smith replaces Doris Kemper
1956	Hot Shots	Jimmy Murphy replaces Danny Welton
1957	Hold That Hypnotist	Huntz Hall, Stanley Clements, David Condon, Jimmy Murphy
1957	Spook Chasers	David Condon reverts to David Gorcey; first film with Eddie LeRoy; Percy Helton replaces Queenie Smith
1957	Looking for Danger	Last film with Jimmy Murphy; Dick Elliott replaces Percy Helton
1957	Up in Smoke	Huntz Hall, Stanley Clements, David Gorcey, Eddie LeRoy
1958	In the Money	Filmed 1957; released January 1958. Last film in the series.

== Home media ==
In 2012, all 48 Bowery Boys films were made available as a set of manufactured-on-demand DVDs by Warner Brothers under its Warner Archive Collection label in four volumes, each consisting of 12 films on four recordable media discs. Initial distribution was advertised by Warner Bros. as being traditionally replicated on "pressed disc" media in anticipation of high demand for the films to be "remastered from the best available elements."

Preceded by East Side Kids; 1940–1945	The Bowery Boys; 1946–1958	Succeeded by Disbandment
