= Charles R. Marion =

Screenwriter

Charles R. Marion was an American screenwriter who worked on dozens of American films. He married actress Elena Verdugo. They had one son, Richard Marion (1949–1999), who became an actor and director. After their divorce she remarried.

== Filmography ==
- Spooks Run Wild (1941)
- Smart Guy (1943)
- Campus Rhythm (1943)
- The Dark Horse (1946 film)
- Idea Girl (1946)
- The Rose Bowl Story (1952)
- Roar of the Crowd (1953)
- Hot News (1953)
- Apache Territory (1958)
