= William Austin (film editor) =

Canadian-American film editor

- Born: William Nelson Austin; January 28, 1903; Nanaimo, British Columbia, Canada
- Died: December 28, 1993 (aged 90); Los Angeles, California, U.S.
- Occupation: Film editor

William Nelson Austin (January 28, 1903 – December 28, 1993) was a Canadian-American film editor. He was nominated for an Academy Award in the category Best Film Editing for the film Flat Top.

Austin died on December 28, 1993, in Los Angeles, California, at the age of 90.

== Selected filmography ==
- Flat Top (1952)
