= Stanley Clements =

American actor (1926–1981)

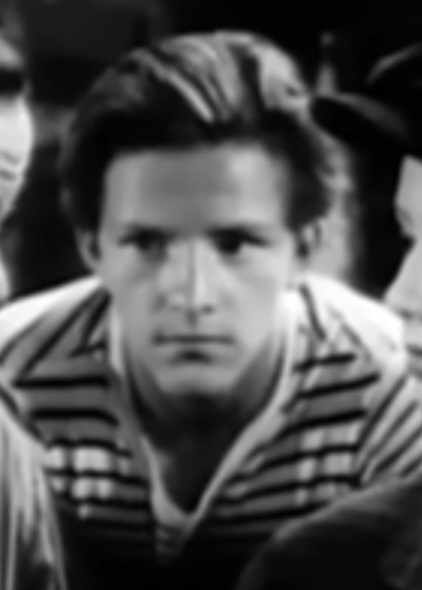
- Clements in 'Neath Brooklyn Bridge (1942)
- Born: Stanislaw Klimowicz; July 16, 1926; Long Island, New York, U.S.
- Died: October 16, 1981 (aged 55); Pasadena, California, U.S.
- Resting place: Riverside National Cemetery, Riverside
- Occupations: Actor; comedian
- Years active: 1941–1978
- Spouses: Gloria Grahame (m. 1945; div. 1948) Maria Walek (m. 1951; div. 1974)
- Children: 1

Stanley Clements (born Stanislaw Klimowicz; July 16, 1926 – October 16, 1981) was an American actor and comedian, best known for portraying "Stash" in the East Side Kids film series, and group leader Stanislaus "Duke" Coveleskie in The Bowery Boys film series.

== Life and career ==
Clements was born on Long Island, New York, and throughout his life he was known informally as "Stosh" (Polish: Staś, the Polish diminutive nickname for "Stanislau"). He realized that he wanted a show-business career while he was in grammar school, and after he graduated from Brooklyn's P.S. 49 in 1938, he toured in vaudeville and found work in radio for the next two years. He then joined the touring company of the Major Bowes Amateur Hour. His career stalled in 1940, and Clements was reduced to panhandling for a time to survive. In 1941, he was signed to a contract by 20th Century-Fox and appeared in juvenile/teen roles in several B films for the studio.

=== East Side Kids ===
In 1942, he was loaned to Monogram Pictures. "Stosh" adopted the nickname "Stash" in the ensemble-cast film series the East Side Kids. He appeared as an East Side Kid in Smart Alecks, 'Neath Brooklyn Bridge, and Ghosts on the Loose. He retained the character name of "Stash" in other films: Right to the Heart, Boots Malone, and Military Academy with That Tenth Avenue Gang.

=== Marriage ===
In August 1945, Clements married actress Gloria Grahame, who played Violet Bick in It's a Wonderful Life and later won a Best Supporting Actress Oscar for The Bad and The Beautiful. The marriage was a stormy one, with Grahame objecting to Clements's drinking and gambling, and Clements being jealous of her dalliances with other men, and it ended in 1948. He married Maria Walek in 1951. In 1964, they adopted her eight-year-old nephew, Sylvester, bringing him to the United States from Poland.

=== Other roles ===
After the East Side Kids, Clements then set out on his own again, this time landing roles in more prestigious pictures. He was featured in perhaps his best-known role as Tony Scaponi in the 1944 Bing Crosby film Going My Way, and scored a great success as a jockey in the 1945 Alan Ladd feature Salty O'Rourke.

Clements's acting career was interrupted by U.S. Army service as a private first class just after World War II. When he returned in 1947, he began appearing in more adult roles in lower-budgeted films, including Johnny Holiday (cast against type as a psychopath) and Destination Murder (as a hired killer).

In 1950 Columbia Pictures launched a series of tough-teen features in direct competition with Monogram's popular Bowery Boys comedies (see below). The first effort was Military Academy with That Tenth Avenue Gang, starring Stanley Clements as Stash Martin, leader of a four-member street gang that a judge remands to a military academy. The series was abandoned after the one film.

Clements began playing adult roles in a series of four action/detective pictures for Allied Artists, for producer Ben Schwalb and director Edward Bernds.

=== The Bowery Boys ===
In 1945, after Leo Gorcey left the East Side Kids in a salary dispute with producer Sam Katzman, Gorcey's teammate Bobby Jordan arranged a meeting with his agent, Jan Grippo. Gorcey partnered with Grippo to produce a new "gang" series called The Bowery Boys, with Gorcey owning a 40% share in the franchise. Gorcey's real-life father Bernard Gorcey was added to the cast as Louie Dumbrowski, proprietor of Louie's Sweet Shop, the headquarters of The Bowery Boys. Younger brother David Gorcey, formerly one of the East Side Kids, returned to appear in the new series.

After Bernard Gorcey was killed in an automobile accident in 1955, a grief-stricken Gorcey turned to alcohol for solace and became a disruptive presence in the studio during the filming of Crashing Las Vegas, trashing scenery and destroying props. In 1956 Gorcey demanded a larger share of ownership from Allied Artists, which was denied, and after a heated conversation, Gorcey stormed off the studio lot and quit the series.

When the series's then-producer Ben Schwalb needed a replacement for Gorcey, he asked Stanley Clements to step in as The Bowery Boys' new ringleader, Stanislaus "Duke" Coveleskie (although Huntz Hall received top billing). Clements comfortably settled into the role of Huntz Hall's sidekick, and co-starred in the final seven Bowery Boys comedies, beginning with Fighting Trouble.

== Later career and death ==
Following the end of The Bowery Boys franchise in 1958, Clements went on to a steady career of supporting roles in film and television. Clements co-wrote the film The Devil's Partner (1958, not released until 1961). In 1960, Clements appeared as Clyde Simpson in the TV western Tales of Wells Fargo, starring Dale Robertson, in the episode "Doc Dawson". He appeared in a 1962 episode of the adventure drama series Straightaway, and a 1963 episode of The Untouchables, "The Jazz Man". Clements also appeared in an episode of Gomer Pyle - U.S.M.C. entitled "Sergeant of The Guard" in 1965. One of his last jobs was an appearance in a nationally advertised commercial for Pringle's potato crisps.

On October 16, 1981, Clements died at age 55 from emphysema in Pasadena, California, 11 days after the passing of his first wife Gloria Grahame. He is buried at Riverside National Cemetery in Riverside, California.

== Films ==
- Tall, Dark and Handsome (1941) - Detroit Harry Morrison Jr.
- Accent on Love (1941) - Patrick Henry Lombroso
- Down in San Diego (1941) - Louie Schwartz
- I Wake Up Screaming (1941) - Newsboy (uncredited)
- Right to the Heart (1942) - Stash
- On the Sunny Side (1942) - Tom Sanders
- Smart Alecks (1942, East Side Kids) - Stash
- 'Neath Brooklyn Bridge (1942. East Side Kids) - Stash
- They Got Me Covered (1943) - Office Boy (uncredited)
- The More the Merrier (1943) - Morton Rodakiewicz
- Ghosts on the Loose (1943, East Side Kids) - Stash
- Thank Your Lucky Stars (1943) - Boy (uncredited)
- Sweet Rosie O'Grady (1943) - Danny (uncredited)
- You're a Lucky Fellow, Mr. Smith (1943) - Alexander Archibald "Squirt" O'Reilly
- Cover Girl (1944) - Elevator Boy (uncredited)
- The Girl in the Case (1944) - Tuffy
- Going My Way (1944) - Tony Scaponi (uncredited)
- See My Lawyer (1945) - Willie
- Salty O'Rourke (1945) - Johnny Cates
- Variety Girl (1947) - Stanley Clements (uncredited)
- Big Town Scandal (1948) - Tommy Malone
- Hazard (1948) - Joe Zinkle, Bellhop
- Canon City (1948) - New
- The Babe Ruth Story (1948) - Western Union Boy
- Joe Palooka in Winner Take All (1948) - Tommy Malone
- Racing Luck (1948) - Boots Warren
- Bad Boy (1949) - Bitsy Johnson
- Mr. Soft Touch (1949) - Yonzi
- Red Light (1949) - Bellboy
- Johnny Holiday (1949) - Eddie Duggan
- Military Academy with That Tenth Avenue Gang (1950) - Stash Martin
- Destination Murder (1950) - Jackie Wales
- Pride of Maryland (1951) - Frankie Longworth
- Boots Malone (1952) - Stash Clements
- Jet Job (1952) - Joe Kovak
- Army Bound (1952) - Frank Cermak
- Off Limits (1952) - Bullets Bradley
- White Lightning (1953) - Mike Connors
- Hot News (1953) - Mark Miller - Reporter
- The Rocket Man (1954) - Bob
- Air Strike (1955) - G.H. Alexander
- Mad at the World (1955) - Marty aka Ignatz
- Robbers' Roost (1955) - Chuck
- Wiretapper (1955) - Tony
- Last of the Desperados (1955) - Bert McGuire
- Fighting Trouble (1956, Bowery Boys) - Stanislaus "Duke" Coveleskie
- Death of a Scoundrel (1956) - Taxi Driver (uncredited)
- Hot Shots (1956, Bowery Boys) - Stanislaus "Duke" Coveleskie
- Hold That Hypnotist (1957, Bowery Boys) - Stanislaus "Duke" Coveleskie
- Spook Chasers (1957, Bowery Boys) - Stanislaus "Duke" Coveleskie
- Looking for Danger (1957, Bowery Boys) - Stanislaus "Duke" Coveleskie
- Up in Smoke (1957, Bowery Boys) - Stanislaus "Duke" Coveleskie
- Official Detective (1957, TV Series) - Rudy Armstrong
- In the Money (1958, Bowery Boys) - Stanislaus "Duke" Coveleskie
- A Nice Little Bank That Should Be Robbed (1958) - Fitz
- Sniper's Ridge (1961) - Cpl. Pumphrey
- Saintly Sinners (1962) - Slim
- Devil's Partner (1962, screenwriter)
- Tammy and the Doctor (1963) - Wally Day
- It's a Mad, Mad, Mad, Mad World (1963) - local reporter at police station (uncredited)
- Panic in the City (1968) - Albert
- The Timber Tramps (1975)
- Hot Lead and Cold Feet (1978) - Saloon Man 2 (final film role)

== Television ==
Year	Title	Role	Notes
1954	The Lone Ranger	Lou Compton	Episode "Ex-Marshal"
1955	Death Valley Days	Red	Episode "Reno"
1960	Death Valley Days	Steve Nelson (uncredited)	Episode "A Woman's Rights"
1960	Gunsmoke	Brad	Episode "The Tragedian"
1961	Wanted: Dead or Alive	Krebs	Season 3, Episode 24 "The Long Search"
1961	Leave It to Beaver	Shoe salesman (who sells Beaver a pair of skates)	Season 5, episode 9
1963	The Untouchables	Hal, Dixieland bandleader	Episode "The Jazz Man"
1969	Gunsmoke	McInnerny	Episode "The Mark of Cain"
1969	The Virginian	Matt	season 8 episode 08 (The substitute)
1970	Gunsmoke	Ed Jacobi	Episode "The Gun"
1973	Gunsmoke	Red	Episode "Arizona Midnight"
