= Triple Threat (1948 film) =

1948 film by Jean Yarbrough

- Directed by: Jean Yarbrough
- Written by: Joseph Carole; Don Martin
- Produced by: Sam Katzman
- Starring: Sammy Baugh; Paul Christman; Johnny Clement; Boley Dancewicz; Bill Dudley; Paul Governali; Jack Jacobs; Sid Luckman; Charley Trippi; Steve Van Buren; Bob Waterfield; Richard Crane; Gloria Henry; Harry Wismer /Tom Harmon; Bob Kelley
- Cinematography: Vincent Farrar
- Edited by: Jerome Thoms
- Production company: Sam Katzman Productions
- Distributed by: Columbia Pictures
- Release date: September 30, 1948
- Running time: 71 minutes
- Country: United States
- Language: English

Triple Threat is a 1948 American drama sport film directed by Jean Yarbrough, produced by Sam Katzman, and starring Gloria Henry.

== Plot ==
College rivals Don Whitney and Joe Nolan clash in the Rose Bowl football game in Pasadena, California, with Don's team victorious. Joe decides to give up football and go to medical school instead, disappointing girlfriend Marian Rutherford, who was hoping Joe would become a rich and famous football hero instead.

Joe does change his mind, joining the Los Angeles Rams, which Joe's mother finds out by watching the Rams' game versus the Green Bay Packers on a television that Whitney has given to Joe's sister Ruth as a gift.

Deliberately injured by Don in a pro football game, Joe is pleased at first when Don is banned from playing in an all-star game. But with the game in progress, Joe has a change of heart and fakes an injury, whereupon Don is permitted to enter the game in his place and score the winning touchdown.

== Cast ==
- Gloria Henry as Ruth Nolan
- Richard Crane as Don Whitney
- Mary Stuart as Marian Rutherford
- Pat Phelan as Joe Nolan
- John Litel as Coach Snyder
- Sammy Baugh as himself
- Paul Christman as himself
- Johnny Clement as himself
- Boley Dancewicz as himself
- Bill Dudley as himself
- Paul Governali as himself
- Jack Jacobs as himself
- Sid Luckman as himself
- Charley Trippi as himself
- Steve Van Buren as himself
- Bob Waterfield as himself
- Harry Wismer as himself
- Tom Harmon as himself
- Bob Kelley as himself

== Production ==
Henry's casting was announced in July 1948.

A number of football players of the era make cameo appearances, including Sammy Baugh, Paul Christman, Sid Luckman, Charley Trippi, Steve Van Buren and Bob Waterfield.

== See also ==
- List of American football films
