= The Files of Jeffrey Jones =

American television program

- Genre: Crime drama
- Starring: Don Haggerty; Gloria Henry
- Country of origin: United States
- Original language: English
- No. of episodes: 39

Original release
- Network: Syndication
- Release: 1954 – 1955

The Files of Jeffrey Jones is an American crime drama that aired in syndication from 1954 to 1955. It was produced by CBS Films in response to the popularity of The Cases of Eddie Drake, which had become a hit after CBS filmed it but sold it to the DuMont Network. The series consisted of 39 half-hour episodes. In addition to being broadcast in the United States, it was sold to two stations for broadcasting in Italy,

== Synopsis ==
Jeffrey Jones was a private investigator working his way through law school in New York City. His girlfriend, Michele "Mike" Malone, was an impulsive newspaper reporter who often had to be rescued by Jones while she was trying to help with his investigations.

The show's theme was Oriental March.

== Personnel ==
Don Haggerty portrayed Jeffrey Jones, and Gloria Henry was Michele "Mike" Malone. Tristam Coffin played Lieutenant Doyle of the police, and Vince Barnett was Joe, the Golden Bubble's proprietor.

Lindsley Parsons was the producer, and Lew Landers was the director.

== Promotion ==
Haggerty promoted the program via personal appearances in stores, and those appearances were supplemented with "TV commercials, displays, billboards, car cards, premiums, gimmicks, and fan club magazines", all of which led to "top ratings in most of the markets" in which stations broadcast the show.
