= Frank Moran =

American boxer and actor (1887–1967)

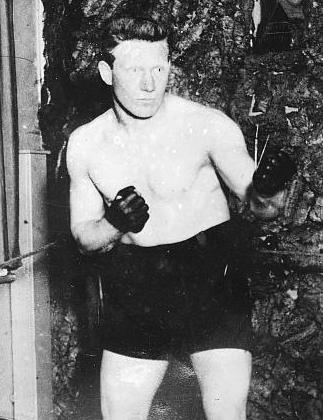
- Born: Francis Charles Moran; 18 March 1887; Cleveland, Ohio, U.S.
- Died: 14 December 1967 (aged 80); Hollywood, California, U.S.
- Occupations: Boxer, actor
- Height: 6 ft 0 1/2 in (184 cm)
- Boxing career
- Other names: The Fighting Dentist
- Weight: Heavyweight

Boxing record
- Total fights: 66
- Wins: 36
- Win by KO: 28
- Losses: 13
- Draws: 16
- No contests: 1
- Acting career
- Years active: 1928–1957
American football career
Frank Moran
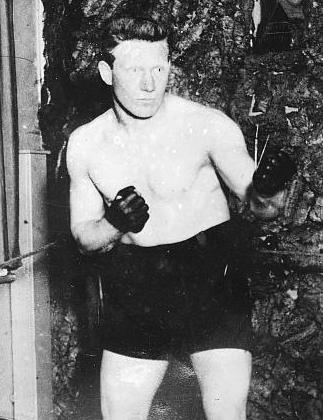
Profile
- Positions: Center; Tackle
Career history
- Hammond Pros (1920); Akron Pros (1920)
- Stats at Pro Football Reference

Francis Charles Moran (18 March 1887 – 14 December 1967) was an American boxer and film actor who fought twice for the Heavyweight Championship of the World, and appeared in over 135 movies in a 25-year film career.

== Sports career ==
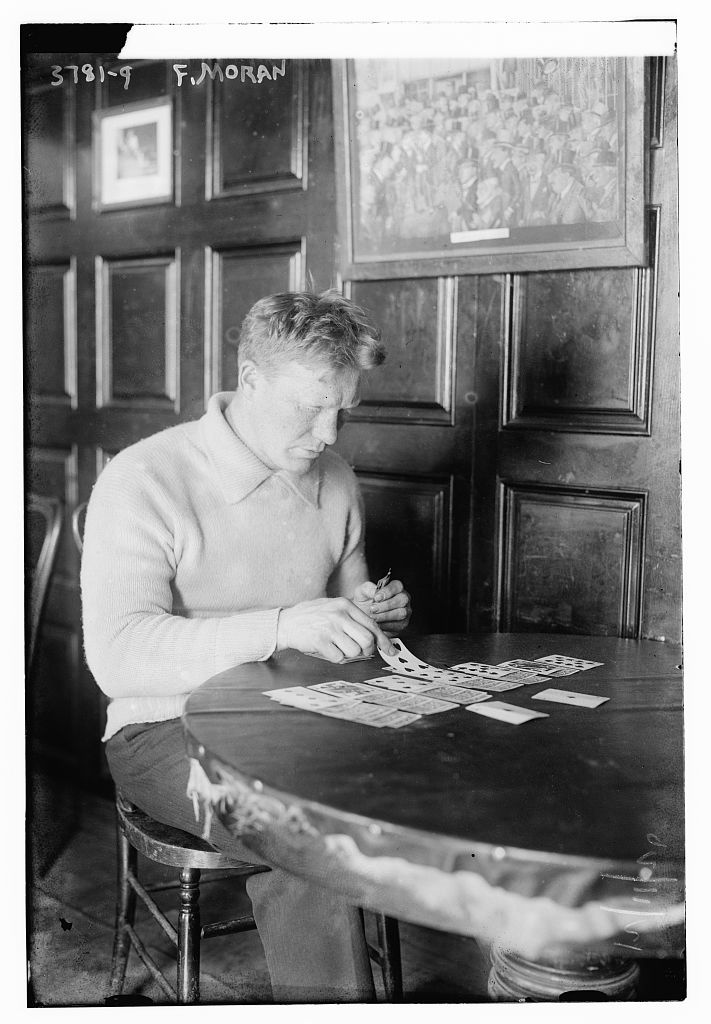
Moran in 1915

Moran was born in Cleveland, Ohio, to Martin Moran and Mary Moran née McNally, immigrants from County Mayo, Ireland. He studied dentistry at the University of Pittsburgh, where he also played football. He played professional football for the Hammond Pros and Akron Pros of the National Football League (NFL) as a tackle and center in 1920.

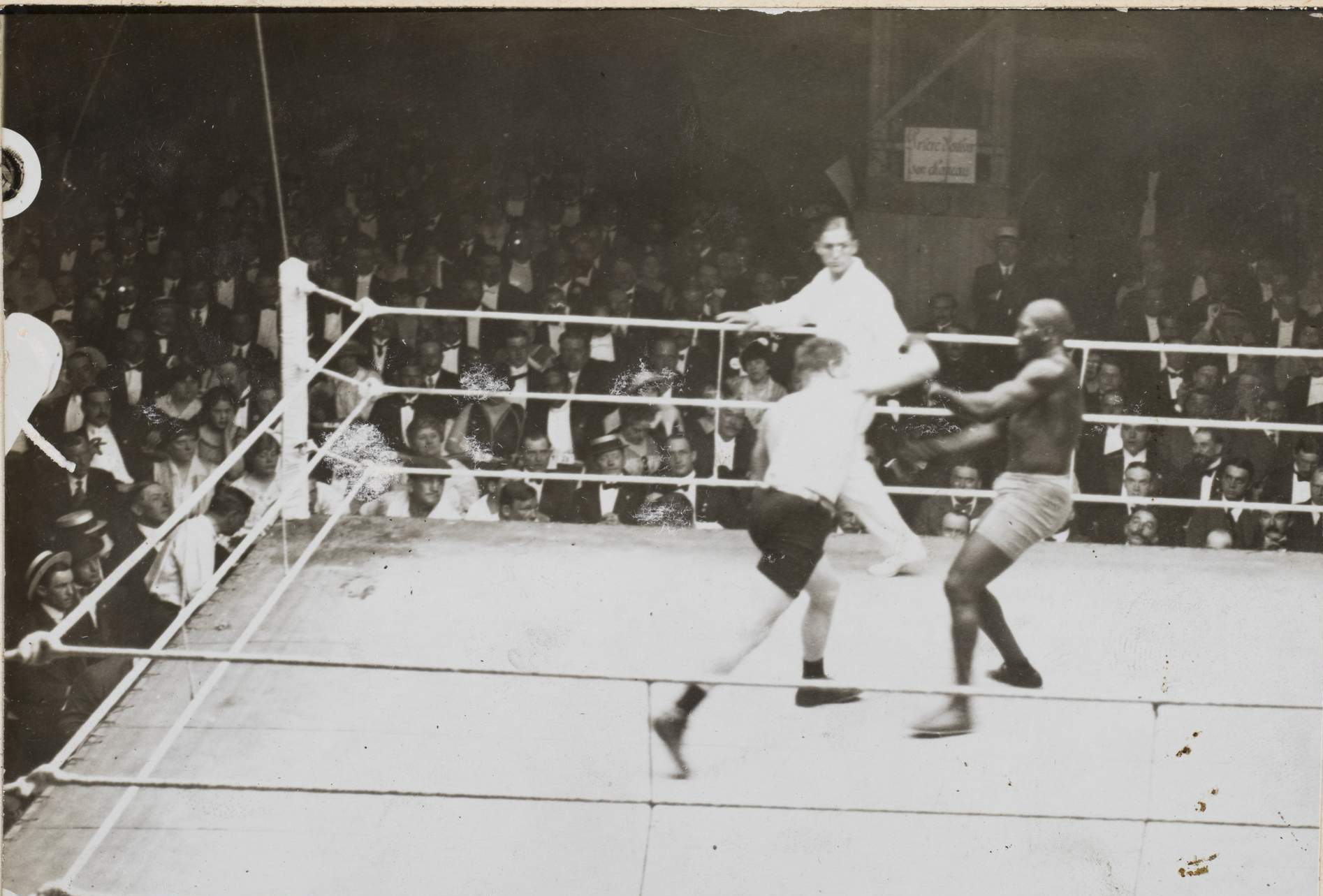
Frank Moran–Jack Johnson match in Paris 1914

While Moran was serving in the U.S. Navy in 1908, he knocked out fighter Fred Cooley in the second round. While serving on the U.S.S. Mayflower, he served as a spar partner for President Theodore Roosevelt. He began his career as a prize-fighter that same year with a match against Fred Broad. Soon, Moran, who had a hard right hand punch which he called "Mary Ann", became known as the "White Hope" of the teens. In 1914 he fought Jack Johnson for the Heavyweight Championship of the World, and in 1916 "The Fighting Dentist" went up against Jess Willard for the same title, but lost both bouts. He lost his last fight to Marcel Nilles for the Heavyweight Championship of France on December 22, 1922. He retired from boxing after 66 bouts with a record of 36 wins (28 by a knockout), 13 losses, 16 draws and 1 no contest.

Frank Moran was inducted into the Pennsylvania Boxing Hall of Fame in 2012.

== Film career ==
After acting in one show on Broadway in 1926 – a stage adaptation of Theodore Dreiser's novel An American Tragedy – Moran made his film debut in 1928 when he did two silent films, The Chinatown Mystery and Ships of the Night, but his film career didn't start in earnest until 1933, when he appeared as himself in The Prizefighter and the Lady, and also in Mae West's She Done Him Wrong, in which he played a convict. This was typical of the kinds of roles Moran was to play for the next 25 years – gangsters, henchmen, "plug uglies", bartenders, stage hands, sailors, guards, cops, bouncers, moving men, sergeants and other soldiers – roles which belied his personal gentleness and sensitivity.

In the 1940s, Moran was part of Preston Sturges' unofficial "stock company" of character actors, appearing in every American film written and directed by Sturges with one exception. He was seen in The Great McGinty, Christmas in July, The Lady Eve, Sullivan's Travels, The Palm Beach Story, The Miracle of Morgan's Creek, Hail the Conquering Hero, The Great Moment, The Sin of Harold Diddlebock and Unfaithfully Yours. It was Moran who, as a cop in Sturges' Christmas in July (1940), halted a tirade by an argumentative Jewish storeowner by barking, "Who do ya think you are, Hitler?" And it was Moran who, as a tough chauffeur in Sullivan's Travels (1942), patiently explains to his traveling companions the meaning of the word "paraphrase."

Moran was usually credited for his performances, but almost never received star or featured billing. One exception was Monogram Pictures's Return of the Ape Man (1944), starring Bela Lugosi and John Carradine, in which Moran shared credit for the title role with George Zucco, although, in fact, Zucco became ill and Moran replaced him – Zucco does not appear in the film as released. Also, at the beginning of his acting career, Moran was part of the featured cast in Raoul Walsh's Sailor's Luck (1933).

Other notable films in which Moran appeared include Charlie Chaplin's Modern Times 1936, Fred Astaire and Ginger Rogers's Follow the Fleet, Shall We Dance, and Carefree (1938), Frank Capra's Meet John Doe (1941), 1943's Lady of Burlesque starring Barbara Stanwyck and Road to Utopia with Bob Hope and Bing Crosby (1946).

Moran's final film appearance was an uncredited bit part in The Iron Sheriff, a Western, in 1957 at the age of 70. He was 80 when he died in Hollywood, California on 14 December 1967 of a heart attack.

== Selected filmography ==
- Dressed to Kill (1928) – Gangster (uncredited)
- The Chinatown Mystery (1928)
- Ships of the Night (1928) – First Mate
- Flaming Gold (1932) – Truck Driver in Cantina (uncredited)
- Me and My Gal (1932) – Frank – Drunk's Foil (uncredited)
- Sensation Hunters (1933) – Bartender (uncredited)
- Hot Pepper (1933) – Montmartre Cafe Doorman (uncredited)
- She Done Him Wrong (1933) – Framed Convict (uncredited)
- Sailor's Luck (1933) – Bilge Moran
- The Little Giant (1933) – Mug with Flowers Gift (uncredited)
- Song of the Eagle (1933) – Ex-Doughboy Guard (uncredited)
- Gambling Ship (1933) – Gunman (uncredited)
- Pilgrimage (1933) – Sergeant on Train (uncredited)
- Her First Mate (1933) – First Mate on Night Boat (uncredited)
- The Bowery (1933) – Bettor (uncredited)
- The Prizefighter and the Lady (1933) – Frank Moran – Heavyweight Boxer (uncredited)
- Hoop-La (1933) – Side Show Craps Player (uncredited)
- Mr. Skitch (1933) – Roulette Table Staff (uncredited)
- No More Women (1934) – Brownie
- Coming Out Party (1934) – Minor Role (uncredited)
- Looking for Trouble (1934) – Shovel Henchman (uncredited)
- Change of Heart (1934) – Moving Man (uncredited)
- The World Moves On (1934) – Sergeant Culbert, Soldier in Trench
- Have a Heart (1934) – Bruiser Who Trips (uncredited)
- Judge Priest (1934) – Townsman in Saloon (uncredited)
- Jealousy (1934) – Fighter (uncredited)
- Bright Eyes (1934) – Truck Driver (uncredited)
- Helldorado (1935) – Man in Car (uncredited)
- The Good Fairy (1935) – Moving Man (uncredited)
- Six Gun Justice (1935) – Frank – Bartender
- The Winning Ticket (1935) – Bartender (uncredited)
- Gold Diggers of 1935 (1935) – Stagehand (uncredited)
- Princess O'Hara (1935) – Mug (uncredited)
- Baby Face Harrington (1935) – Sleepy Prisoner (uncredited)
- Swellhead (1935) – The Rube
- The Informer (1935) – McCabe – Bouncer (uncredited)
- Let 'Em Have It (1935) – Terry (uncredited)
- Public Hero No. 1 (1935) – Moran – Prison Guard (uncredited)
- Don't Bet on Blondes (1935) – Gangster #5 (uncredited)
- Dante's Inferno (1935) – Mike – a Stoker (uncredited)
- Call of the Wild (1935) – Bartender in Dawson (uncredited)
- We're in the Money (1935) – Butch's Mug (uncredited)
- Navy Wife (1935) – Sailor (uncredited)
- The Payoff (1935) – Marty's Henchman (uncredited)
- Bad Boy (1935) – Detective Jake (uncredited)
- The Rainmakers (1935) – Farmer (uncredited)
- Stars Over Broadway (1935) – Champ (uncredited)
- Sylvia Scarlett (1935) – Minor Role (uncredited)
- Modern Times (1936) – Convict (uncredited)
- It Had to Happen (1936) – Moving Man (uncredited)
- Follow the Fleet (1936) – Husky Sailor (uncredited)
- Counterfeit (1936) – Joe (uncredited)
- Mummy's Boys (1936) – Larson – a Sailor (uncredited)
- End of the Trail (1936) – Drunk (uncredited)
- The Plough and the Stars (1936) – Minor Role (uncredited)
- Sea Devils (1937) – Frank – Bartender (uncredited)
- Shall We Dance (1937) – Process Server (uncredited)
- They Gave Him a Gun (1937) – Gangster in Court (uncredited)
- This Is My Affair (1937) – Prison Guard (uncredited)
- Angel's Holiday (1937) – Tough Man (uncredited)
- A Damsel in Distress (1937) – Bobby (uncredited)
- You're a Sweetheart (1937) – Bartender (uncredited)
- Wise Girl (1937) – Jake Kelly – Department Store Bouncer (uncredited)
- Battle of Broadway (1938) – Pinky McCann
- Joy of Living (1938) – Gravelly-Voiced Cop at Dock (uncredited)
- Passport Husband (1938) – Baggage Man (uncredited)
- Carefree (1938) – Cab Driver (uncredited)
- Time Out for Murder (1938) – First Furniture Repo Man (uncredited)
- Submarine Patrol (1938) – Waiter at Dive (uncredited)
- The Law West of Tombstone (1938) – Ex-Fighter turned 'Schoolmarm' (uncredited)
- Inside Story (1939) – Attendant (uncredited)
- Everybody's Baby (1939) – Tough (uncredited)
- East Side of Heaven (1939) – Workman (uncredited)
- The Lady's from Kentucky (1939) – Customer (uncredited)
- Ex-Champ (1939) – Bartender (uncredited)
- Boy Friend (1939) – Bouncer (uncredited)
- Captain Fury (1939) – Guard #4
- 6,000 Enemies (1939) – Boxing Referee (uncredited)
- Torchy Blane... Playing with Dynamite (1939) – Gahagan's Wrestling Handler (uncredited)
- Beware Spooks! (1939) – Second Moving Man (uncredited)
- Another Thin Man (1939) – Butch – a Father (uncredited)
- The Big Guy (1939) – Ninth Guard (uncredited)
- Honeymoon Deferred (1940) – (uncredited)
- Castle on the Hudson (1940) – Cell Block Guard (uncredited)
- Brother Orchid (1940) – Louie the Lug (uncredited)
- The Great McGinty (1940) – The Boss' Chauffeur
- Christmas in July (1940) – Patrolman Murphy (uncredited)
- Love Thy Neighbor (1940) – Lefty – Bodyguard (uncredited)
- Behind the News (1940) – Frank – Gym Attendant (uncredited)
- High Sierra (1941) – Policeman (uncredited)
- The Lady Eve (1941) – Bartender at Pike's Party (uncredited)
- Meet John Doe (1941) – (uncredited)
- Footlight Fever (1941) – Gravelly-Voiced Longshoreman (uncredited)
- Knockout (1941) – East Side Pug (uncredited)
- Federal Fugitives (1941) – Ox – Chuck's Pal
- Penny Serenade (1941) – Cab Driver at Doorway, New Year's Party (uncredited)
- The Flame of New Orleans (1941) – Sailor in Oyster Bed Cafe (uncredited)
- Double Cross (1941) – Cookie
- Sullivan's Travels (1941) – Tough Chauffeur
- Pacific Blackout (1941) – Companion of Injured Criminal in Black Maria (uncredited)
- The Man Who Came to Dinner (1942) – Haggerty (uncredited)
- A Date with the Falcon (1942) – Dutch (uncredited)
- Butch Minds the Baby (1942) – Jack the Beefer
- The Corpse Vanishes (1942) – Angel
- Grand Central Murder (1942) – Louis 'Mileaway Louie' Scarpi (uncredited)
- The Big Street (1942) – Contributing Mug (uncredited)
- The Palm Beach Story (1942) – Brakeman
- Isle of Missing Men (1942) – Prisoner (uncredited)
- Gentleman Jim (1942) – Spectator – Sullivan Fight (uncredited)
- 'Neath Brooklyn Bridge (1942) – Mike – Bartender (uncredited)
- The Living Ghost (1942) – The Caretaker (uncredited)
- Star Spangled Rhythm (1942) – Man With Preston Sturges (uncredited)
- No Time for Love (1943) – Erector Tender (uncredited)
- Salute for Three (1943) – Sleepy Soldier Slugging Rognan (uncredited)
- Lady of Burlesque (1943) – Beer Keg Deliveryman (uncredited)
- Ghosts on the Loose (1943) – Monk
- Government Girl (1943) – Tough Sergeant (uncredited)
- The Miracle of Morgan's Creek (1943) – Military Police Sergeant #1 (uncredited)
- Man from Frisco (1944) – Mr. Hanson (uncredited)
- Return of the Ape Man (1944) – Ape Man
- The Great Moment (1944) – John, Hospital Porter (uncredited)
- Hail the Conquering Hero (1944) – Town Painter (uncredited)
- I Love a Soldier (1944) – Hammer Machine Operator (uncredited)
- The Princess and the Pirate (1944) – Heckler (uncredited)
- Belle of the Yukon (1944) – Miner (uncredited)
- The Man in Half Moon Street (1945) – Trawler Captain (uncredited)
- Salty O'Rourke (1945) – Donovan, Bartender (uncredited)
- The Great John L. (1945) – Tough at Flood Fight (uncredited)
- Road to Utopia (1945) – Bartender (uncredited)
- Pardon My Past (1945) – Timothy – Chauffeur / Henchman
- The Kid from Brooklyn (1946) – Fight Manager (uncredited)
- The French Key (1946) – Listener to Sam's Story (uncredited)
- Crack-Up (1946) – Bartender (uncredited)
- No Leave, No Love (1946) – Waiter (uncredited)
- The Sin of Harold Diddlebock (1947) – Mike the Cop (uncredited)
- Unconquered (1947) – Tom – Coarse Slave Seeking Rich Widow (uncredited)
- Wild Harvest (1947) – Alperson Crew Member (uncredited)
- On Our Merry Way (1948) – Bookie
- Unfaithfully Yours (1948) – Fire Chief (uncredited)
- Fighting Fools (1949) – Dimwitted Goon (uncredited)
- The Lady Gambles (1949) – Murphy
- Stage to Tucson (1950) – Al (uncredited)
- Iron Man (1951) – Handler (uncredited)
- The Square Jungle (1955) – Referee (uncredited)
- The Iron Sheriff (1957) – Sarcastic Townsman (uncredited) (final film role)
