= Telephone Operator (film) =

1937 film by Scott Pembroke

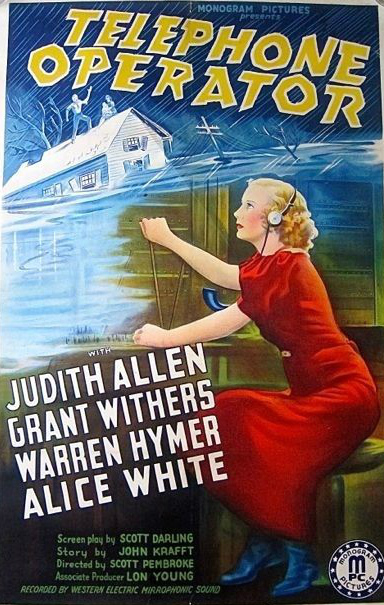
- Film poster
- Directed by: Scott Pembroke
- Screenplay by: Scott Darling
- Story by: John W. Krafft
- Produced by: Lon Young (associate producer)
- Starring: Judith Allen; Grant Withers; Warren Hymer; Alice White
- Cinematography: Gilbert Warrenton
- Edited by: Russell F. Schoengarth
- Distributed by: Monogram Pictures
- Release date: December 7, 1937
- Running time: 70 minutes
- Country: United States
- Language: English

Telephone Operator is a 1937 American drama film directed by Scott Pembroke and starring Judith Allen, Grant Withers, Warren Hymer, and Alice White.

== Plot ==
A telephone operator covering for an absent friend is flooded with calls seeking emergency assistance as the Riverdale Dam bursts and the community falls victim to a major deluge.

== Cast ==
- Judith Allen as Helen Molly
- Grant Withers as Red
- Warren Hymer as Shorty
- Alice White as Dottie Stengal
- Ronnie Cosby as Ted Molloy
- Pat Flaherty as Tom Sommers
- Greta Granstedt as Sylvia Sommers
- William Haade as Heaver
- Cornelius Keefe as Pat Campbell
- Dorothy Vaughan as Mrs. Molloy
