= Military Academy with That Tenth Avenue Gang =

1950 film by D. Ross Lederman

- Film poster
- Directed by: D. Ross Lederman
- Written by: Howard J. Green
- Starring: Stanley Clements; Leon Tyler yron Welton and Gene Collins
- Production company: Columbia Pictures
- Distributed by: Columbia Pictures
- Release date: April 27, 1950
- Running time: 64 minutes
- Country: United States
- Language: English

Military Academy with That Tenth Avenue Gang is a 1950 American comedy-drama film directed by D. Ross Lederman and starring Stanley Clements, Leon Tyler, Myron Welton and Gene Collins.

== Plot ==
Four streetwise teenage troublemakers continually run afoul of the law. The gang has an audience with Judge Ralph Townsend, himself a former street kid named "Knuckles". The kids have the choice of one year in reform school or a term in a military academy. Ringleader Stash Martin thinks that the stay at the academy will be akin to a vacation that will allow them to "beat the rap by six months". Their superior officer, Major Tony Thomas, was once a streetwise kid from the old neighborhood, and he tries to reform the gang without betraying his past to the commandant. His rival Major Norcross learns about his past and attempts to blackmail him.

== Production ==
The film was inspired by Columbia's 1940 feature Military Academy and was a direct imitation of the popular series of features starring the Bowery Boys and their antecedents the East Side Kids.

The film was intended as the first of a series, but plans were abandoned after its release. Leon Tyler, who portrays Specs in the film, identified the disruptive behavior of costar Myron Welton as the cause. Six years later, Stanley Clements recruited Welton—now billed as Danny Welton—to appear in Clements's first Bowery Boys picture, Fighting Trouble. Welton again proved unreliable and was dismissed after production.

Military Academy with That Tenth Avenue Gang was produced very inexpensively, with many scenes filmed on location at the Brown Military Academy in California. The film was directed by D. Ross Lederman, who directed Military Academy in 1940 and was usually assigned to the cheapest, shortest films on the Columbia's schedule. The film was Lederman's last feature as director, although he later worked with the second unit on two more films before becoming a television director.

== Cast ==
- Stanley Clements as Stash Martin
- Leon Tyler as Specs
- Myron Welton as Danny
- Gene Collins as Mac
- James Millican as Maj. Tony Thomas
- James Seay as Maj. Norcross
- William Johnstone as Col. Jamison
- John Hamilton as Judge Ralph Townsend
