= Gloria Henry =

American actress (1923–2021)

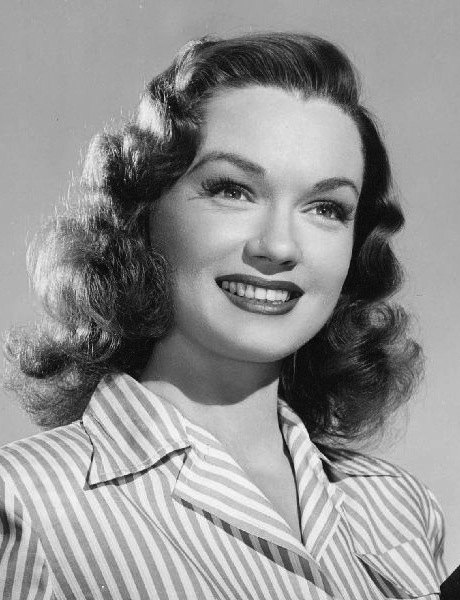
- Henry c. 1947
- Born: Gloria Eileen McEniry; April 2, 1923; New Orleans, Louisiana, U.S.
- Died: April 3, 2021 (aged 98); Los Angeles, California, U.S.
- Occupation: Actress
- Years active: 1947–2005, 2012
- Spouses: Robert D. Lamb (m. 1943; div. 1948); Craig Ellwood (m. 1949; div. 1977)
- Children: 3

Gloria Eileen McEniry (April 2, 1923 – April 3, 2021), known professionally as Gloria Henry, was an American actress, best known for her role as Alice Mitchell, Dennis' mother, from 1959 to 1963 on the CBS family sitcom Dennis the Menace.

== Early life ==
Henry was born Gloria Eileen McEniry on April 2, 1923. She lived and grew up on the edge of the Garden District of New Orleans, Louisiana. She was educated at the Worcester Art Museum School in Massachusetts. Henry moved to Los Angeles in her late teens and worked on a number of radio shows and commercials using the stage name of Gloria Henry. Her topics of discussions were gossip, fashion, and sports. She also performed in little theater groups.

== Career ==
=== Early career ===
Signed by an agent, Henry transitioned into film work via Columbia Studios in 1946, and made her debut as the female lead in the horse racing film Sport of Kings (1947). She had featured roles in the romantic comedy Miss Grant Takes Richmond (1949) that starred Lucille Ball, and the western Rancho Notorious (1952) with Marlene Dietrich. Henry also appeared in three sports-themed stories; the football film Triple Threat (1948), the horse race tale Racing Luck (1948), and the William Bendix baseball comedy Kill the Umpire (1950).

The 1950s were a mixture of B films and episodic TV guest parts such as My Little Margie (1952) and the premiere episode of Perry Mason, "The Case of the Restless Redhead" (1957). She was also a regular on the detective series The Files of Jeffrey Jones (1954), starring Don Haggerty, but was written out of the show when she became pregnant. She also appeared on The Abbott and Costello Show in an episode entitled "The Pigeon".

=== Dennis the Menace ===
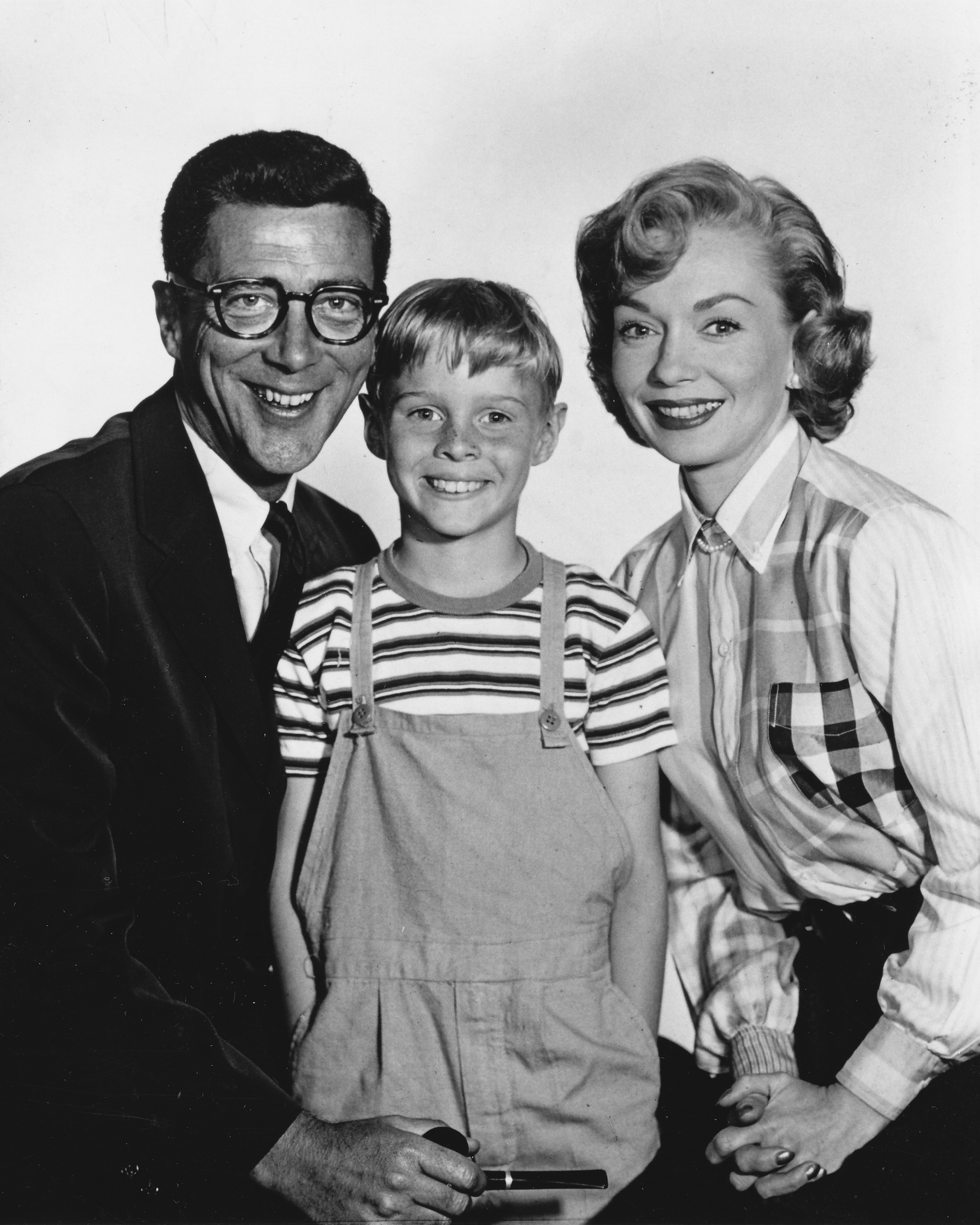
Henry with her Dennis the Menace co-stars, Herbert Anderson and Jay North, 1959

In 1959, Henry landed the role for which she would become most well known, that of Dennis' mother Alice Mitchell on the CBS comedy television series Dennis the Menace. The series co-starred Herbert Anderson as her husband, and young Jay North in the title role of Dennis. Henry portrayed sunny domesticity and maternal warmth for four seasons until the series' cancellation in 1963.

=== After Dennis the Menace ===
Henry's career slowed down considerably after Dennis the Menace. In 1992, she stated that she had become so associated with the role of Alice Mitchell that she had become typecast in mother roles. She appeared occasionally in TV movies playing assorted bit-part matrons, and in 1989, she played a small role as an art-collecting society matron in the prime time soap opera Dallas.

Henry returned to the big screen in a brief role in Her Minor Thing (2005), a romantic comedy directed by Charles Matthau, Walter Matthau's son. She occasionally attended film festivals and nostalgia conventions. In 2012, she guest-starred on the Parks and Recreation episode "Campaign Shake-Up", playing the role of Mary-Elizabeth Clinch.

== Personal life and death ==
Henry was of Scottish and Irish ancestry. She was married to Robert D. Lamb between 1943 and 1948. She wed architect Craig Ellwood in 1949; they divorced in 1977. The couple had three children, Jeffrey, Adam, and Erin Ellwood.

Henry died at her home in Los Angeles, on April 3, 2021, one day after her 98th birthday.

== Filmography ==
Year	Title	Role
1947	Sport of Kings	Doc Richardson
1947	Keeper of the Bees	Alice
1947	Bulldog Drummond Strikes Back	Ellen Curtiss
1948	Adventures in Silverado	Jeannie Manning
1948	Port Said	Gila Lingallo/Helena Guistano
1948	The Arkansas Swing	Margie MacGregor
1948	The Strawberry Roan	Connie Bailey
1948	Triple Threat	Ruth Nolan
1948	Racing Luck	Phyllis Warren
1949	Rusty Saves a Life	Lyddy Hazard
1949	Law of the Barbary Coast	Julie Adams
1949	Johnny Allegro	Addie
1949	Air Hostess	Ruth Jackson
1949	Miss Grant Takes Richmond	Helen White
1949	Feudin' Rhythm	Valerie Kay
1949	Riders in the Sky	Anne Lawson
1950	Kill the Umpire	Lucy Johnson
1950	Rookie Fireman	Peggy Walters
1950	The Tougher They Come	Rattle Rafferty
1950	Counterspy Meets Scotland Yard	Martha Holden
1950	Lightning Guns	Susan Atkins
1951	Al Jennings of Oklahoma	Alice Calhoun
1951	Yellow Fin	Nina Torres
1952	Rancho Notorious	Beth Forbes
1953	Hot News	Kerry Barker
1958	Gang War	Edie Avery
1988	Doin' Time on Planet Earth	Mary Richmond
2005	Her Minor Thing	Mrs. Porter

== Television appearances ==
- The Abbott and Costello Show – Ruby Norton
- Mr. & Mrs. North – Ruth Spencer (1953)
- My Little Margie – Norma Calkins (1953)
- The Files of Jeffrey Jones (1954)
- Navy Log – Eileen Murphy (1957)
- Perry Mason – Helene Chaney (1957)
- The Walter Winchell File (1957)
- Tales of Wells Fargo – Sharon Burns (1957)
- Father Knows Best – Mildred Harris (1957)
- The Life of Riley – Miss Cosgrove (1958)
- Rescue 8 – Joan (1958)
- The Thin Man (1959)
- Dennis the Menace – Alice Mitchell (1959–63)
- Hazel (1963)
- The Snoop Sisters (1974)
- The Brady Brides (1981)
- Falcon Crest (1987)
- Dallas (1989)
- Hunter (1990)
- Doogie Howser, M.D. (1992)
- Parks and Recreation (2012)
