= Hold That Hypnotist =

1957 film

- Directed by: Austen Jewell
- Written by: Dan Pepper
- Produced by: Ben Schwalb
- Starring: Huntz Hall; Stanley Clements; David Gorcey; Jimmy Murphy; Jane Nigh; Queenie Smith
- Cinematography: Harry Neumann
- Edited by: George White
- Music by: Marlin Skiles
- Production company: Allied Artists Pictures
- Distributed by: Allied Artists Pictures
- Release date: March 10, 1957
- Running time: 61 minutes
- Country: United States
- Language: English

Hold That Hypnotist is a 1957 American comedy film starring The Bowery Boys. The film was released on March 10, 1957 by Allied Artists and is the forty-fourth film in the series. Former assistant director Austen Jewell was now given the chance to direct; this was the first of only two theatrical films he directed. Hold That Hypnotist is a topical satire of hypnotist Morey Bernstein's best-selling book The Search for Bridey Murphy and its film adaptation.

== Plot ==
Dr. Simon Noble claims that through hypnosis, one can regress into a former life, or lives, from the past. Kate Kelly, the Bowery Boys' landlady, is intrigued and offers to pay Noble $200 for treatment. Duke already knows Noble as a local quack, and attends a press party with the gang to expose Noble as a fraud. Sach is hypnotized by accident and recounts stories from several past lives. Evidently Sach once lived during the colonial era as Algy Winkle, an English tax collector in Charleston, South Carolina. Winkle runs afoul of the notorious Blackbeard the Pirate, and wins Blackbeard's map leading to buried treasure. Sach can only recall the details of the map under hypnosis. The Bowery Boys use Sach's directions to locate the treasure, while Dr. Noble and his criminal confederates try to take it away from them.

== Cast ==
=== The Bowery Boys ===
- Huntz Hall as Horace Debussy "Sach" Jones
- Stanley Clements as Stanislaus "Duke" Coveleskie
- David Gorcey as Chuck (credited as David Condon)
- Jimmy Murphy as Myron

=== Supporting cast ===
- Queenie Smith as Mrs. Kate Kelly
- Jane Nigh as Cleo Daniels
- Robert Foulk as Dr. Simon Noble
- James Flavin as Jake Morgan
- Murray Alper as Hank
- Mel Welles as Blackbeard
- Dick Elliott as Hotel Clerk
- Mary Treen as Chambermaid
- Frank Orth as Angry Man in Library

=== Notes ===
- Last appearance of Mrs. Kelly.
- The film's working title was Out of This World.
- This is the only Bowery Boys credit for author Dan Pepper -- actually a pseudonym for screenwriter Lou Morheim, who had been blacklisted.
- Jane Nigh's last film. Her last screen credit had been in 1952, when she had starred in Monogram features. She returned to the studio for this Bowery Boys comedy.
- Character actor Dick Elliott had last appeared with Huntz Hall in Lucky Losers (1950) as a happy-go-lucky conventioneer. Hall remembered him and improvised a line in Hold That Hypnotist: "See you at the next convention!" Two pictures later, in Looking for Danger, Elliott would assume the role of café owner Mike Clancy, replacing Bernard Gorcey as sweet-shop owner Louie Dumbrowski.

== Reception ==
Allen M. Widem of Motion Picture Daily was a fan of the series and gave Hold That Hypnotist good marks: "The realigned Bowery Boys team, toplined by Huntz Hall and Stanley Clements, is assured of a fond rating with this latest effort. The Dan Pepper screenplay, an obviously tongue-in-cheek lampoon of prevailing best-sellers having to do with reincarnation, gets its premise stated with deft touches early. And there's nary a feeble moment until the windup with Hall, Clements, and cohorts rarely out of control. These boys know their timing, an important ingredient in farce. This is a Ben Schwalb production, directed with precision by Austen Jewell."

In some cities Hold That Hypnotist played on double-feature programs as the companion feature to either the Elvis Presley hit Loving You or a reissue of Walt Disney's cartoon feature Bambi. Variety reported excellent business.

== Home media ==
Warner Archives released the film on made-to-order DVD in the United States as part of "The Bowery Boys, Volume Four" on August 26, 2014.

Preceded by Hot Shots; 1956	'The Bowery Boys' movies 1946-1958	Succeeded by Spook Chasers; 1957
