= Ghosts on the Loose =

1943 film by William Beaudine

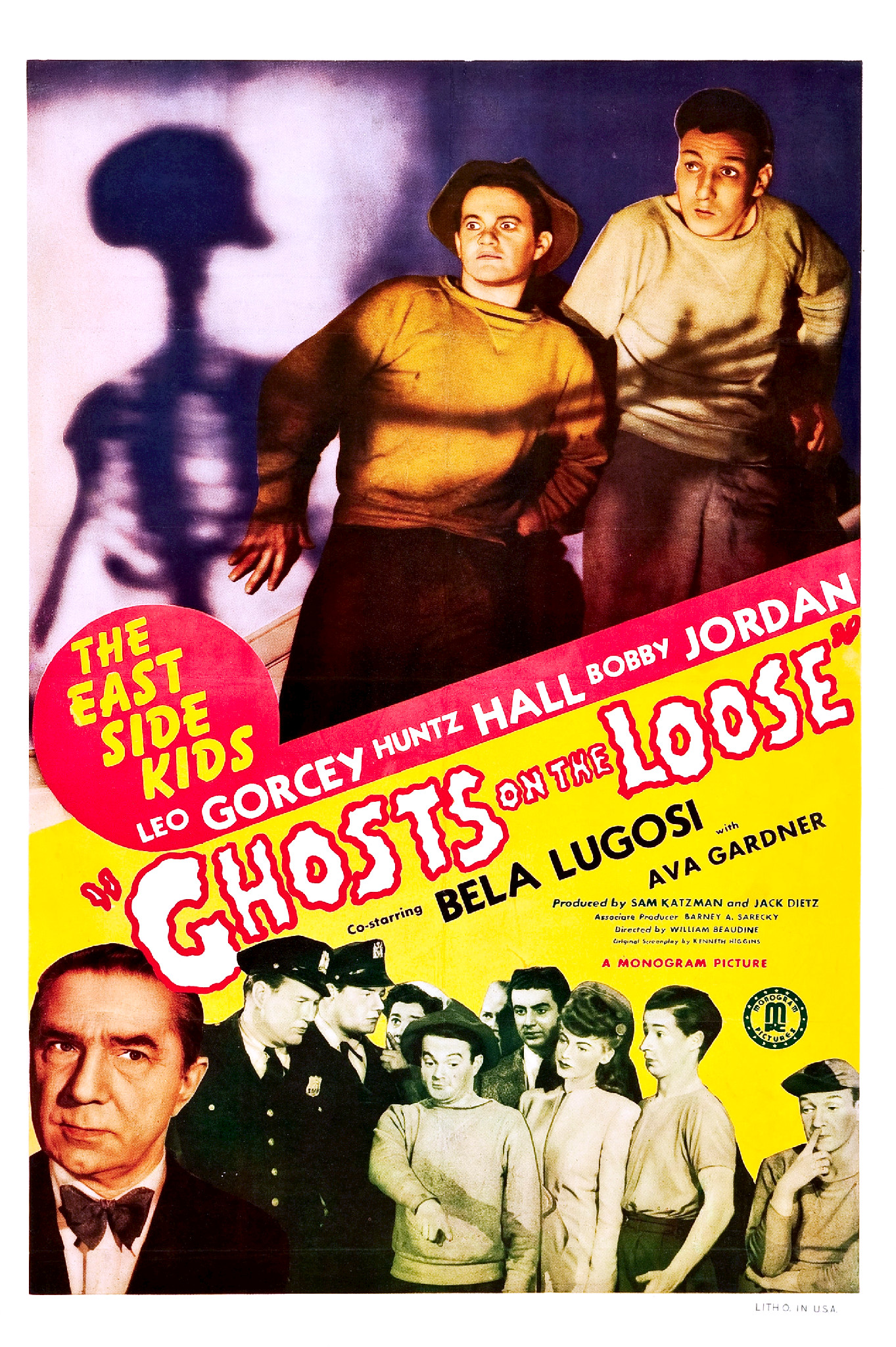
- Theatrical release poster
- Directed by: William Beaudine
- Written by: Kenneth Higgins (original screenplay)
- Produced by: Jack Dietz (producer); Sam Katzman (producer); Barney A. Sarecky (associate producer)
- Starring: Leo Gorcey; Huntz Hall; Bela Lugosi; Ava Gardner
- Cinematography: Mack Stengler
- Edited by: Carl Pierson
- Music by: Edward J. Kay
- Production company: Monogram Pictures
- Release date: July 30, 1943
- Running time: 67 minutes (DVD); 65 minutes (copyright length)
- Country: United States
- Language: English

Ghosts on the Loose is a 1943 American comedy horror film and the fourteenth film in the East Side Kids series, directed by William Beaudine. The picture co-stars horror film icon Bela Lugosi as well as Ava Gardner in one of her earliest roles.

The film was released in the United Kingdom as Ghosts in the Night.

== Plot ==
When Glimpy's sister Betty marries Jack, Muggs organizes the wedding. He and the gang present a choral version of "Drink to Me Only with Thine Eyes". Scruno, Stash, and Benny provide a floral centerpiece—a stolen funeral wreath. Glimpy, the best man, wears a tuxedo borrowed from the corpse of a murdered gangster. Muggs arranges for a police escort by providing authorities with a fake complaint that a notorious gang threaten to break up the proceedings. But there's just one thing bothering Jack: the new home he has purchased is located next door to a reputed haunted house. Unbeknownst to all, though, it is secretly being used by a Nazi spy ring. Their leader is Emil, and he is furious. Jack's new home will be needed for future activities as both houses are connected by secret tunnels.

Thus, Emil orders his minion, Tony, to buy it from Jack, which he offers to do, for twice what Jack paid for it. Before the sale is closed, however, Tony gives Jack a note containing his address for future contact, namely that of the neighboring haunted house. On his way to their honeymoon, Jack accidentally drops the note. Later, Muggs picks it up, thinking it is the address of the house that Jack and Betty are moving into. He decides to surprise the couple by having the gang tidy up the house before their arrival. Meanwhile, at the Honeymoon Hotel, Jack is given an urgent message to contact the parties who originally sold him the house. They worry about strange activities in the house next door. She warns Jack and the police to investigate. Then, Jack and Betty drive to their house to get to the bottom of the rumors.

When the gang arrive at the house occupied by Nazis, Emil and his spies pull out all stops to scare the boys into believing the house is possessed by evil, dangerous spirits. But the scheme backfires when the boys, hiding in the cellar, discover a printing press with leaflets from the New Order entitled "How to destroy the Allies". As Jack and Betty and the police arrive, the gang takes on Emil and his spy ring and wins. In the end, Betty, Jack, and the East Side Kids are all forced to spend the newlyweds' honeymoon stuck in their new home, under quarantine. It seems that Glimpy has come down with German measles. As a result, his face appears to be decorated with small swastikas.

== Cast ==
=== The East Side Kids ===
- Leo Gorcey as Muggs
- Huntz Hall as Glimpy
- Bobby Jordan as Danny
- Sammy Morrison as Scruno
- Billy Benedict as Benny (a.k.a. Skinny)
- Stanley Clements as Stash
- Bobby Stone as Dave (a.k.a. Rocky)
- Bill Bates as Sleepy (a.k.a. Dave)

=== Additional cast ===
- Bela Lugosi as Emil
- Ava Gardner as Betty
- Rick Vallin as Jack
- Minerva Urecal as Hilda
- Wheeler Oakman as Tony
- Peter Seal as Bruno
- Frank Moran as Monk
- Jack Mulhall as Lieutenant
- Harry Depp as John G. Elwood (uncredited)
- Tom Herbert as Park Central Plaza Desk Clerk (uncredited)
- Robert F. Hill as Minister at Wedding (uncredited)
- Eddie Laughton as Wedding Usher (uncredited)
- Kay Marvis as Bridesmaid (uncredited)
- Ray Miller as Police Officer Mulligan (uncredited)
- Blanche Payson as Mrs. John G. Elwood (uncredited)
- Snub Pollard as Flower Delivery Man (uncredited)

== Production ==
The film was originally called Ghosts in the Night, which had also been the working title for Spooks Run Wild, the first time Lugosi worked with the East Side Kids. The film was a "special" from Monogram. They borrowed Ava Gardner from MGM (then best known as having been married to Mickey Rooney) to play the female lead.

Filming began February 8, 1943. Exactly ten days earlier, producer Jack Dietz was sentenced to seven months in jail for tax evasion. The title was changed to Ghosts on the Loose in April 1943.

- Later on in the film, when The East Side Kids, Rick Vallin, and Ava Gardner are waiting for the cops, Muggs says, "They should be here any minute". Glimpy responds by saying, "Who?", to which Muggs says, "Oh, he's on first". This is an obvious reference to the old vaudeville routine "Who's on First?", which had been done on stage by numerous comedians over the years but had been made famous during this period by Abbott and Costello.
- Muggs makes reference to "The Katzman Mob," a jokey hat-tip to producer Sam Katzman.
- Set in the United States home front during World War II, Muggs accuses Scruno of having hallucinations due to drinking too much coffee. Glimpy eagerly asks "Where did you get it?" due to the rationing of coffee from 1942 onwards.
- This was Bill Bates' only East Side Kids film.
- Last official East Side Kids film for Bobby Jordan (Danny), "Sunshine Sammy" Morrison (Scruno), and Stanley Clements (Stash). Jordan would later make a guest appearance as himself in the East Side Kids film Bowery Champs, and would eventually rejoin the group for the first eight films in the series The Bowery Boys. Morrison would return briefly as 'Scruno' in Follow the Leader (his scenes were actually unused footage from a previous East Side Kids film). Clements would not work with the boys again until 1956, when he was brought in to replace Leo Gorcey as the leader of The Bowery Boys.
- Gabriel Dell and Dave Durand are absent.
- Leo Gorcey's wife Kay Marvis appears as a bridesmaid during the wedding scenes.
- "The East Side Kids" were characters in a series of films released by Monogram Pictures from 1940 through 1945. Many of them were originally part of The Dead End Kids and The Little Tough Guys, and several of them later became members of The Bowery Boys.

== Reception ==
The Los Angeles Times called the film "a feeble and cheaply produced bit of unenticing nothingness."

== Soundtrack ==
- Bill Bates and sung by The East Side Kids – "Drink to Me Only with Thine Eyes" (Music by R. Melish, lyrics (poem "To Celia" by Ben Jonson))
- Bill Bates – "Bridal Chorus (Here Comes the Bride)" from Lohengrin (Written by Richard Wagner)
- Bill Bates – "The Wedding March" from A Midsummer Night's Dream, Op.61 (Written by Felix Mendelssohn-Bartholdy)
