= Sailor's Luck =

1933 film by Raoul Walsh

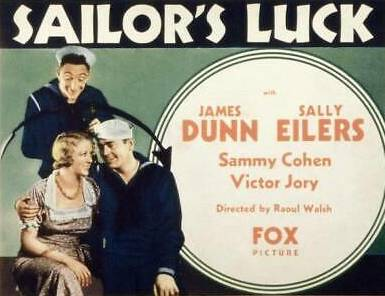
- Lobby card
- Directed by: Raoul Walsh
- Written by: Marguerite Roberts; Charlotte Miller
- Starring: James Dunn; Sally Eilers; Victor Jory; Frank Moran
- Cinematography: Arthur C. Miller
- Edited by: Jack Murray
- Distributed by: Fox Film
- Release date: March 10, 1933
- Running time: 78 min.
- Country: United States
- Language: English

Sailor's Luck is a 1933 American pre-Code romantic comedy film directed by Raoul Walsh for Fox Film Corporation. It stars James Dunn, Sally Eilers, Victor Jory, and Frank Moran.

The plot has a sailor on shore leave falling for a nice girl, with a series of misunderstandings leading each to doubt the other's loyalty. A cast of colorful characters provides comic relief and the film concludes with a massive brawl between sailors and bouncers at a dance marathon.

== Plot ==
On shore leave in San Pedro Harbor, sailor Jimmy Harrigan agrees to phone Minnie Broadhurst on behalf of his mates Barnacle Benny and Bilge, though the last time the boys visited her, Minnie smashed chairs over their heads. Jimmy reaches Sally Brent instead, who hangs up when she hears he is a sailor. When Jimmy and his friends make a personal visit to the boardinghouse, Sally is on her way to a job interview at a swimming pool. Benny and Bilge are chased out of the boardinghouse by the proprietor and Jimmy, who tries to follow Sally, is chased by an Italian banana seller who had been robbed by his mates. At the pool, Sally is hired by the lascivious Nugent Busby, whose gay assistant keeps an eye out for the arrival of Busby's wife. After handing out bathing suits, Sally is instructed to take Jimmy as her first student, though she admits she doesn't know how to swim. In the pool area, Benny and Bilge take turns trying to dive and jump, with humorous results. The boardinghouse proprietor, banana seller, and a policeman all arrive on the scene, as does Busby's wife Mona, and amid arguing, everyone is thrown into the pool in their street clothes.

Later Jimmy sees Sally on the street and joins her and her drunken escort for dinner. Jimmy and Sally dance and become acquainted. Since Sally can no longer pay for her room at the boardinghouse, Jimmy rents a room for them at an apartment house owned by the lecherous Baron Bartolo. Sally is nervous about being alone with Jimmy in the room and stiffens when he maneuvers her over to the bed and oafishly grabs her for a kiss. Hurt, Jimmy tells her off and also gives her a spanking for agreeing to go to a room with a man she doesn't know, then walks out. The next morning, he returns with food for breakfast. Sally is more amenable to him, though he still fumbles to kiss her. Jimmy promises to return again that evening, but his ship sails for San Francisco and he is unable to send word. Sally feels abandoned and fends off the unwanted advances of Bartolo, who offers to arrange for her to win the $1,000 first prize at the dance marathon that he is sponsoring. Sally arranges to babysit for Junior, the son of Elmer Brown who lives on the same floor.

When Jimmy phones Sally from San Francisco, Bartolo answers and Jimmy is livid that Sally is cheating on him. Jimmy returns the following day with lingerie as a reconciliation gift. Seeing Brown exiting Sally's room, he insults Sally and rips up the lingerie. Sally decides to enter the dance marathon. Jimmy finds out that Brown had really been picking up his son from Sally's room and rushes to see her at the dance marathon, but is ejected by Bartolo's bouncers. Jimmy climbs up a tree and flings himself through a window, grabs Sally away from her dancing partner, and punches Bartolo. The fleet of sailors watching the dance marathon from a balcony jump onto the floor and a huge brawl breaks out between them and the bouncers while Jimmy and Sally escape. Safe in a taxi, Jimmy gives Sally her wedding ring and they embrace.

== Cast ==
- James Dunn as Jimmy Harrigan
- Sally Eilers as Sally Brent
- Victor Jory as Baron Darrow (Note: The character is called Baron Bartolo in the script and on a sign seen in the film, but is listed as Baron Darrow in the screen credits and by reviewers.)
- Sammy Cohen as Barnacle Benny
- Frank Moran as Bilge
- Esther Muir as Minnie Broadhurst
- Will Stanton as J. Felix Hemingway
- Curley Wright as Angelo
- Jerry Mandy as Rico
- Lucien Littlefield as Elmer Brown
- Buster Phelps as Elmer Brown, Jr.

== Production ==
=== Development ===
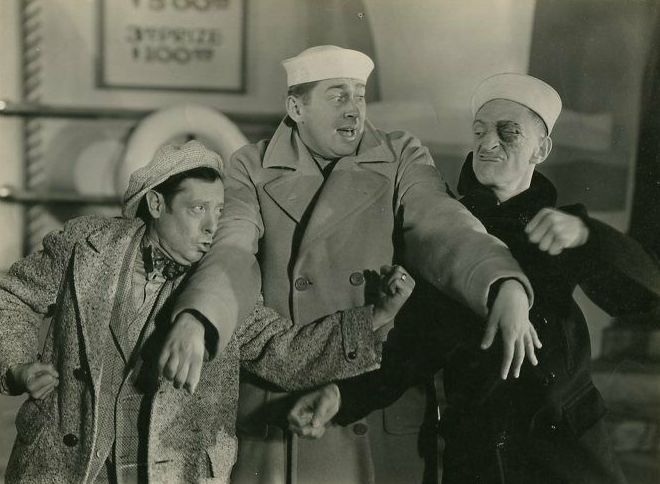
The sailors on shore leave

Before the start of production, the film's title was changed from Sailor's Luck to Bad Boy, ostensibly in order to associate it with James Dunn and Sally Eilers' first successful screen pairing in Bad Girl (1931). The studio reinstated the original title during production. Fox later released Bad Boy in 1935, starring Dunn and Dorothy Wilson.

Sailor's Luck was the last film that Raoul Walsh directed for Fox. According to Walsh biographer Moss, the film's theme is expressed in a lyric in an onscreen musical number: "Love makes the world go 'round". The film managed to evade censorship even though it showed the unmarried characters played by Dunn and Eilers renting a room together, lying together and kissing in bed, and Eilers scampering around the room and out into the hallway wearing nothing but a bedsheet.

A gay pool attendant is seen in the swimming pool sequence. Played by Frank Atkinson, the character flounces about and uses effeminate body language. When he bids the sailors adieu, Dunn tells his mates in Pig Latin: "Gay-zee ansy-pay". A draft script indicates that a more fully-developed male gay character named Violetta was originally planned for this sequence, being either a pool employee or the manager's brother-in-law. This character was later converted to a man named Cyril "whom the sailors engage in a mock flirtation". Finally the character was toned down even more to the nameless individual who appears in the film.

Sailor's Luck was the first film for costume designer William Lambert, who worked for the studio until 1936.

=== Casting ===
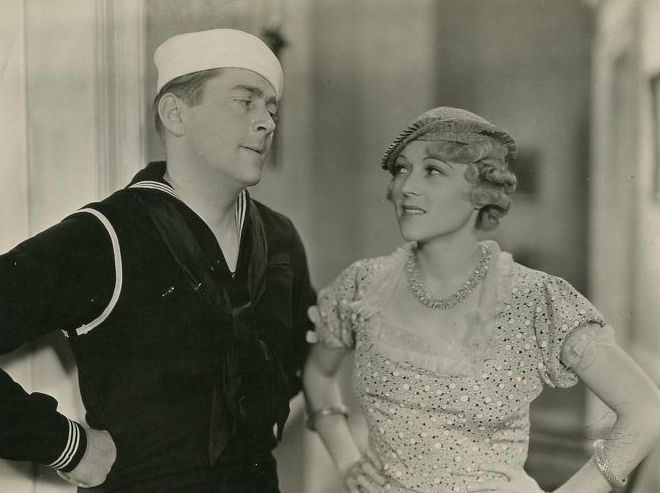
Publicity photo of James Dunn and Sally Eilers

Sailor's Luck was the fourth screen pairing of the popular acting duo of Dunn and Eilers. Several character actors from Walsh's previous production, Me and My Gal (1932), were also cast—including Frank Moran, who plays the same character as he did in the earlier film. This was the first major screen role for Victor Jory.

=== Filming ===
Production took place from January 12 to early February 1933. According to a February 24, 1933, item in Variety, "[a] new dissolve is used which is a cross between a corkscrew and an iris". The magazine called the technique novel but overused in the early scenes. Smith notes Walsh's use of "depth staging" in the swimming-pool, Hawaiian restaurant, and dance marathon scenes, which involved "utilizing multiple focal points in the foreground, middle-ground and background". The film also incorporates wipes "in which one image replaces another by spiraling out from the middle of the screen".

== Release ==
Sailor's Luck was released on March 10, 1933.

== Critical reception ==
Mordaunt Hall of The New York Times wrote that the film's "lusty humor" was a hit with the screening audience. He did not find the story particularly original, but said that the constant infusion of "wisecracks and comic incidents" smoothed over dramatic scenes and lapses in continuity. He made special note of the swimming pool sequence—"No matter how many times fully clad persons are beheld falling into water, it is an idea that always tickles the risibleness of an audience"—and the climactic fight at the dance marathon—"Bottles fly through the air and all movable furniture is smashed. James [Dunn] goes through a frightful pummeling, but looks unscathed immediately afterward".

An exhibitor's report in the Motion Picture Herald also noted the positive audience response to a screening, adding, "A little off color in spots, but seemed to go by unnoticed". The Brooklyn Times-Union praised the film for "driving away the depression", writing: "Not only has the picture many good wisecracks but some of the incidents are very comical and keep the audience in good humor from start to finish".

The Pittsburgh Press skewered the film, calling it "a cheap and humorless story of vulgar implication". But while the reviewer considered the film the epitome of bad taste, she was surprised that the theater audience loved it, noting that they laughed at every comedic line and drunken-sailor gag. She concluded: "It is obvious that I have no grounds for my displeasure over the picture, except my own standards of what constitutes good taste. Because it seemed to me exceedingly common and trashy, it simply could not amuse me".

The Dayton Daily News wrote that Dunn and Eilers "work together like real young people and have no actorish manners. This is a real advantage in such a picture as 'Sailor's Luck'". The Northern Star also called the duo "two of the screen's most natural actors".

The Star Tribune reviewer was pleased with the presence of "two comics who are comics"—Sammy Cohen and Frank Moran. In addition to their funny demeanors, "the gag men have been furnished with some good situations and some better lines". Victor Jory's performance as a lecherous landlord was also singled out for praise in reviews. Erickson calls his portrayal "deliciously slimy", while Leonard Maltin says he is "insanely funny".

In modern reviews, Maltin gave the film three stars, describing it as "funny" and "offbeat". Scheuer and Pardi accorded it 1 ½ stars, typing it as a "routine comedy". Film historian William K. Everson called the film "fast…raucous…racy…the relaxed censorship is well in evidence".

The film is rarely screened in the twenty-first century, and has not been made available on home video. Cine-file.info calls it "one of the least politically correct films of the 1930s".

== Lawsuit ==
Walter S. Lawrence, author of The Marathon Dancer, sued Fox Film for copyright infringement, claiming that the film extracted significant material from his book which he had shown to studio executives in 1932. The judge upheld Fox's demurrer and dismissed the case.

== Sources ==
- Barrios, Richard (2005). Screened Out: Playing Gay in Hollywood from Edison to Stonewall. Routledge. ISBN 9781134001798.
- Doherty, Thomas (1999). Pre-Code Hollywood: Sex, Immorality, and Insurrection in American Cinema, 1930-1934. Columbia University Press. ISBN 9780231500128.
- Erickson, Hal (2012). Military Comedy Films: A Critical Survey and Filmography of Hollywood Releases Since 1918. McFarland. ISBN 9780786462902.
- Leese, Elizabeth (2012). Costume Design in the Movies: An Illustrated Guide to the Work of 157 Great Designers (Revised ed.). Courier Corporation. ISBN 9780486134291.
- Maltin, Leonard (1994). Leonard Maltin's Movie Encyclopedia. Dutton. ISBN 9780525936350.
- Maltin, Leonard (1995). Leonard Maltin's Movie and Video Guide. Plume. ISBN 9780452273276.
- McElvaine, Robert S. (2004). Encyclopedia of the Great Depression: A-K. Macmillan Reference USA. ISBN 9780028656878.
- Moss, Marilyn (2011). Raoul Walsh: The True Adventures of Hollywood's Legendary Director. University Press of Kentucky. ISBN 9780813133942.
- Scheuer, Steven H.; Pardi, Robert J., eds. (1987). Movies on TV, 1988-1989 (11th ed.). Bantam Books. ISBN 9780553268515.
