= Dangerous Lady (film) =

1941 film by Bernard B. Ray

- Theatrical release poster
- Directed by: Bernard B. Ray
- Screenplay by: Jack Natteford
- Story by: Leslie T. White
- Produced by: Bernard B. Ray
- Starring: Neil Hamilton; June Storey; Douglas Fowley; Evelyn Brent; Greta Granstedt; Malcolm 'Bud' McTaggart
- Cinematography: Jack Greenhalgh
- Edited by: Carl Himm
- Production company: Producers Releasing Corporation
- Distributed by: Producers Releasing Corporation
- Release date: September 12, 1941
- Running time: 63 minutes
- Country: United States
- Language: English

Dangerous Lady is a 1941 American crime film directed by Bernard B. Ray and written by Jack Natteford. The film stars Neil Hamilton, June Storey, Douglas Fowley, Evelyn Brent, Greta Granstedt and Malcolm "Bud" McTaggart. It was released on September 12, 1941 by Producers Releasing Corporation.

== Plot ==
Detective Duke Martindel and his wife Phyllis work together to clear a girl falsely convicted of having murdered a judge. The case goes stale when two people who knew the truth are murdered. Duke and Phyllis then become prisoners of the real murderers, and the case is solved.

== Cast ==
- Neil Hamilton as Duke Martindel
- June Storey as Phyllis Martindel
- Douglas Fowley as Sergeant Brent
- Evelyn Brent as Hester Engel
- Greta Granstedt as Leila Bostwick
- Malcolm 'Bud' McTaggart as Joe Link
- Jack Mulhall as Jones
- John Holland as Guy Kisling
- Emmett Vogan as Dr. Grayson
- Terry Walker as Annie Lowell
- Kenneth Harlan as Det. Dunlap
- Carl Stockdale as Judge Harding
- John Ince as Capt. Newton
- Sheila Darcy as Reporter
- Jimmy Aubrey as Janitor
