= Greta Granstedt =

American actress (1907–1987)

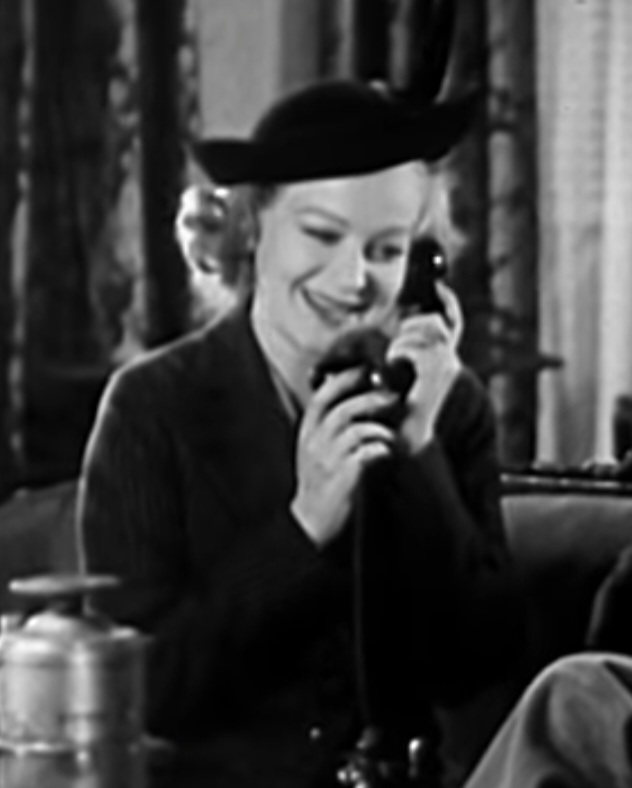
- Granstedt in Telephone Operator (1937)
- Born: Irene Louise Granstedt; July 13, 1907; Scandia, Kansas, U.S.
- Died: October 7, 1987 (aged 80); Los Angeles, California, U.S.
- Occupation: Actress
- Years active: 1927–1964
- Spouses: Robert Thomas Bleibler (m. 1923; ann. 1924) Alfreld Lowenthal (m. 1925; ann. 1926) Ramon Ramos (m. 1933; div. 1935) Marcel Olis (m. 1935; ann. 1936) Max de la Vega (m. 1938; ann. 1941) Mayor Lawrence Hikle Wright (m. 1944; ann. 1946) Howard Preston Thomas (m. 1953)

Greta Granstedt (born Irene Louise Granstedt; July 13, 1907 – October 7, 1987) was an American film and television actress.

== Early life ==
Irene "Greta" Granstedt was the second child of Theodore and Emma née Stauffer Granstedt, born in Malmö, Sweden on July 13, 1907 (some sources report 1908).

The Granstedt family was one of the five pioneer families from Sweden who settled in this north central Kansas community in 1867–68. The families left Sweden in response to famine.

== Shooting of Harold Galloway ==
Granstedt first gained notoriety and widespread media attention in April 1922 after she shot her 17-year-old boyfriend, Harold Galloway, with a pistol she borrowed from a friend. Granstedt, then only 14 years old, claimed in interviews that the shooting was accidental, a claim that coincided with Galloway's own story of the incident.

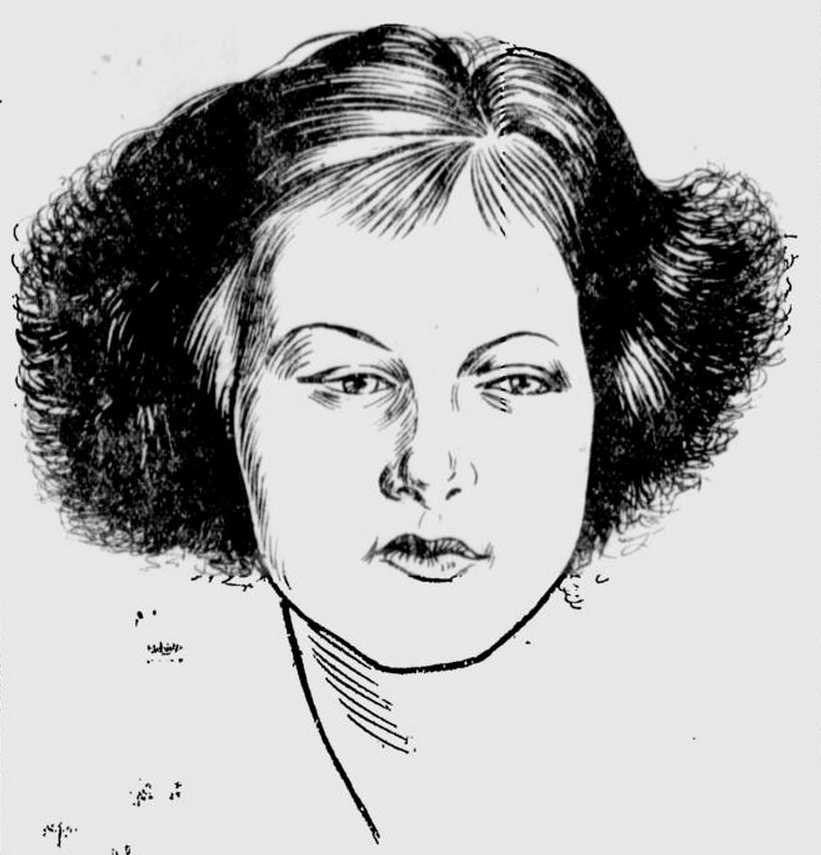
Newspaper sketch of 14-year-old Irene Granstedt, 1922

That night I walked out to Busters house - it's a mile and a half out in the country. I took the gun with me because I guess I felt afraid to walk out there and back alone. (. . .) I started home and I met a boy friend who offered to give me a lift. He was going to the party at the parish house and when we got to the corner I said I'd get out and walk the rest of the way. I started home and after he'd told Harold and Buster where I was, they started after me. (. . .) When I saw Harold coming - I wanted to make up - and I didn't want to make up. I guess I didn't know what I wanted to do. I hid behind a tree but my foot caught in my cape and I stumbled and he saw me. Harold came up to me and said: 'Oh, what's the use of fighting! Let's make up and have things as they were before. Let's start all over again!' But something inside of me wouldn't let me make up. I didn't feel as if things could ever be all right again. And I said: 'No - if I'm not good enough to speak to at school, I'm not good enough to make up with!' (. . .)Harold took a step towards me and I told him to stay where he was - not to touch me. And I took the gun out of the holster and thought I'd scare him. Harold said 'Shoot - I'm not yellow!' and then he grabbed the gun and it went off.

Although newspapers originally printed this version of things, they soon switched to a more tantalizing view, claiming Granstedt hid in the shadows with the gun, waiting to shoot Galloway as revenge for him attending the Parish dance with another girl. This version of the story would continue to be printed, even decades later. Galloway's father and aunt leaned towards this story saying Granstedt was jealous and possessive, and that she procured the gun and sought out Galloway in order to scare him. The aunt believed Granstedt shot Galloway to keep him from entering into the navy and thus leaving her.

Granstedt was not charged by the victim or his parents. It was originally believed Galloway would die when peritonitis developed in the wound, however his condition greatly improved within days. Granstedt was brought to trial in juvenile court on June 30, 1922 where she was sentenced to time in a reform school and was banished from Mountain View.

== Pre-career ==
Greta left Mountain View as a young woman and spent the next several years in San Francisco. Among other ways of making a living, she modeled at San Francisco Art Association in the summer of 1926. In 1927 she and a companion travelled from San Francisco to Los Angeles. There is some confusion about who the companion was, or the way the pair got to Hollywood. She and Bessie Hyde reportedly took a steamer from San Francisco to Los Angeles. Bessie met Glen Hyde on that trip, falling in love and sealing her fate as a lost river runner. Greta, it is said, disembarked from the trip with the desire to become a movie star and the choice of a new name. She boarded as Eraine, a name she'd adopted in San Francisco, and departed as Greta. She boarded as a Kansas born Californian, disembarked as a Swedish born starlet in waiting. Another source maintains that Greta, barely surviving the hardships of living on her own in San Francisco, hitch-hiked from northern to southern California in the company of Geraldine Andrews

By 1929 Greta had reconciled with her parents. They embarked from San Francisco aboard the aging passenger steamer, the San Juan. On September 2 the San Juan collided with oil tanker S. C. T. Dodd off Pigeon Point, California, near the location of the Pigeon Point lighthouse. Her father survived, but her mother was among the 77 drowned in the incident. The tragedy played out for several months in Los Angeles, with the crew being found negligent.

== Career ==
By the mid-1920s, Greta had appeared opposite Joseph Schildkraut in a Los Angeles production of From Hell Came a Lady.

While in New York City, Greta appeared in three Broadway plays, the short-lived Tomorrow's Harvest (four performances, opened December 4, 1934 at the 49th St. Theatre), and the longer-running If a Body (45 performances, opening April 30, 1935 at the Biltmore Theatre). In the 1936-37 season, she was in the drama Thirsty Soil at the 48th St. Theatre (opening February 3, 1937, 13 performances).

== Personal life ==
Granstedt was married eight times, four of which were annulled. Her first marriage, in 1923, to Robert Blieber, was annulled because Greta was a minor. Her second marriage, to Robert Lowenthal, a California artist, in 1926, was also annulled. Her third marriage, to Ramon Ramos, in 1933, was celebrated by the one year, one term Mayor of New York, John P. O'Brien. The marriage lasted only eighteen months. Ramos was a Latin band leader, and tango dancer. Granstedt joined him at the Miami Biltmore in the fall of 1933 In 1935 Granstedt married French World War I veteran, designer and photographer Marcel Olis, in Greenwich, Connecticut. It is unclear how long this marriage lasted, but it also ended in divorce.

Her fifth husband was Max de Vega, a matte painter Matte painting is a motion picture special effects technique involving the painting of movie backgrounds on glass. Married in Mexico, she was considering divorce when she discovered that de Vega was still married to a previous wife, and thus she sought annulment rather than divorce. It was with de Vega that Granstedt had a house designed for her by the California Architect Harwell Harris. The Hollywood home is still extant, and Greta lived in the house through the 1950s.

In 1944 Granstedt wed for a sixth time, this time to Major Lawrence Wright. The marriage was annulled, when Wright, like de Vega proved to still be married to another woman. In 1947 she married for a seventh time. Because four of the previous marriages had been annulled, newspaper reports of the time described this as "her second wedding, his first." She and husband Arthur G. Forbes (1947–1951) adopted a son from Tennessee in 1948. In 1951 Greta was awarded custody of the child she and Forbes had adopted three years earlier. They named the child Christopher Michael. Her final marriage, in 1965, was to Howard Thomas. By this time Greta had been treated for throat cancer and recovered. She and Thomas purchased ranch land in British Columbia.

== Selected filmography ==
- The Girl from Everywhere (1927) - Minor Role (uncredited)
- Buck Privates (1928) - Minor Role (uncredited)
- Excess Baggage (1928) - Betty Ford
- Close Harmony (1929) - Eva Larue
- College Love (1929) - (uncredited)
- The Last Performance (1929) - Sister Avt (uncredited)
- Mexicali Rose (1929) - Marie's Blonde Friend (uncredited)
- Embarrassing Moments (1930) - Betty Black
- Caught Short (1930) - Fanny Lee
- Sunny Skies (1930) - College Widow
- What a Man! (1930) - Hanna, the Maid
- The Lightning Express (1930, Serial) - Kate
- Hot Curves (1930) - Girlfriend
- Street Scene (1931) - Mae Jones
- The Deceiver (1931) - Celia Adams
- The Secret Witness (1931) - Moll (uncredited)
- Manhattan Parade (1931) - Charlotte Evans
- After Tomorrow (1932) - Betty
- They Never Come Back (1932) - Mary Nolan
- Night World (1932) - Blonde (uncredited)
- McKenna of the Mounted (1932) - Shirley Kennedy
- The Night Club Lady (1932) - Eunice Tahon
- Hat Check Girl (1932) - A Party Guest (uncredited)
- The Devil Horse (1932) - Linda Weston
- Madison Square Garden (1932) - Blonde (uncredited)
- Deception (1932)
- Crime Without Passion (1934) - Della (uncredited)
- Telephone Operator (1937) - Sylvia Sommers
- The Adventures of Marco Polo (1938) - Kaidu Maid (uncredited)
- You and Me (1938) - Sales Clerk (uncredited)
- Reformatory (1938) - Millie
- Marie Antoinette (1938) - Woman in Gaming House (uncredited)
- The Last Express (1938) - Gladys Hewitt
- There Goes My Heart (1938) - Thelda - Joan's Swedish Maid (uncredited)
- When Tomorrow Comes (1939) - Waitress (uncredited)
- Hitler, Beast of Berlin (1939) - Anna Wahl
- Road to Singapore (1940) - Babe (uncredited)
- Women Without Names (1940) - Inmate (uncredited)
- Stranger on the Third Floor (1940) - Housekeeper (uncredited)
- Third Finger, Left Hand (1940) - Selma (uncredited)
- A Man Betrayed (1941) - Information Booth Clerk (uncredited)
- Dangerous Lady (1941) - Leila Bostwick
- Sing Another Chorus (1941) - Soubrette (uncredited)
- Lady Bodyguard (1943) - Gertie (uncredited)
- I Escaped from the Gestapo (1943) - Hilda (uncredited)
- First Comes Courage (1943) - Girl Assistant (uncredited)
- The Story of Dr. Wassell (1944) - Dutch Nurse (uncredited)
- Here Come the Waves (1944) - Operator at Control Tower (uncredited)
- Roughly Speaking (1945) - Anna's Maid (uncredited)
- Twice Blessed (1945) - Mary's Maid (uncredited)
- Our Vines Have Tender Grapes (1945) - Mrs. Faraassen
- Nocturne (1946) - Clara (uncredited)
- The Razor's Edge (1946) - Hospital Telephone Operator (uncredited)
- Unconquered (1947) - Woman (uncredited)
- Cass Timberlane (1947) - Dagmar (uncredited)
- The Gangster (1947) - Minor Role (uncredited)
- On Our Merry Way (1948) - Mr. Sadd's Secretary (uncredited)
- Hazard (1948) - Woman in Evening Gown in Tank (uncredited)
- Joan of Arc (1948) - Townswoman (uncredited)
- Blondie's Secret (1948) - Mona the Moll
- The Crooked Way (1949) - Hazel Downs
- Red, Hot and Blue (1949) - Movie Patron in Trailer (uncredited)
- Johnny Holiday (1949) - Mrs. Holiday
- Samson and Delilah (1949) - Temple Spectator (uncredited)
- Dark City (1950) - Margie (uncredited)
- The Enforcer (1951) - Mrs. Lazich (uncredited)
- Cause for Alarm! (1951) - Mom (uncredited)
- The Greatest Show on Earth (1952) - Spectator (uncredited)
- The Atomic City (1952) - F.B.I. Agent (uncredited)
- The Juggler (1953) - Carah (uncredited)
- Here Come the Girls (1953) - Washwoman (uncredited)
- Hot News (1953) - Maid (uncredited)
- The Eddie Cantor Story (1953) - Rachel Tobias
- The Birds and the Bees (1956) - Guest (uncredited)
- The Iron Sheriff (1957) - Ellie - Leveret's Sister (uncredited)
- Desire Under the Elms (1958) - Men (uncredited)
- The Return of Dracula (1958) - Cora Mayberry
- The Party Crashers (1958) - Phyllis (uncredited)
