= Hot News (1953 film) =

1953 film by Edward Bernds

- Directed by: Edward Bernds
- Written by: Charles R. Marion; Elwood Ullman
- Produced by: Ben Schwalb
- Starring: Stanley Clements; Gloria Henry; Ted de Corsia; Veda Ann Borg; Scotty Beckett
- Cinematography: Carl E. Guthrie
- Edited by: Bruce B. Pierce
- Music by: Marlin Skiles
- Production company: Monogram Pictures
- Distributed by: Allied Artists
- Release date: October 11, 1953
- Running time: 61 minutes
- Country: United States
- Language: English

Hot News is a 1953 American crime film directed by Edward Bernds and starring Stanley Clements, Gloria Henry and Ted de Corsia. An ex-boxer now working as a sportswriter goes after a gambling syndicate attempting to control the fight game.

== Plot ==
Sportswriter and ex-prizefighter Mark Miller visits his friend, former champion Jim O'Hara, as he prepares to challenge for the world light heavyweight title. Jim had initially promised he'd retire after losing his title and Mark expresses concerns over his friend's health and condition, but Jim explains that he needs the money and that he bet his entire purse on himself as the underdog. Unbeknownst to Jim, his girlfriend Doris is watching the fight from home with racketeer Dino Rizzo, a close personal associate. The fight is a brutal, one-sided affair and Jim loses by knockout. He is rushed to the hospital, where he dies from his injuries.

Mark is told by Jim's manager Doc that Jim owed a large debt to Rizzo, largely due to his reckless spending on Doris. Though his editor advises caution, Mark writes a piece that publicly condemns Rizzo's involvement in the fight. Mark visits Doris to investigate further, but Doris proves uncooperative and their conversation is interrupted by the arrival of Rizzo, who tries to intimidate Mark. At the behest of the newspaper's legal department, Mark arranges to meet with Doc to collect a sworn affidavit, though Mark arrives just after Doc is fatally run over by Rizzo's enforcer, Augie Grotz. Mark grows determined to prove Rizzo's involvement in Doc's murder, and is soon visited at his home by Rizzo and Augie. Rizzo attempts to pay off Mark with a generous financial offer, but Mark vehemently rejects it.

Rizzo meets with Bill, a rising star in collegiate basketball and Doris's younger brother. Bill initially refuses to shave points when asked by Rizzo, but Rizzo reveals that he has be secretly financing Bill's entire college education through Doris and demands he does as told. Meanwhile, Mark continues his inflammatory columns against Rizzo with the hope that law enforcement will soon look into the case. After Mark takes fashion reporter Kerry out to dinner for her birthday the pair are ambushed by Augie, but they manage to flee. The next day Mark is ordered by legal counsel to stop writing about Rizzo out of the concern he is opening the newspaper up to a libel suit, but Mark and his editor utilize a loophole, writing about Augie's attack on him as a news piece rather than under Mark's column. Shortly after, Mark is attacked and beaten unconscious in his own home by two thugs.

Mark threatens to quit when faced with further pressure from the legal department, but his editor encourages him to continue writing under a pseudonym. When Bill is suspended from his team under suspicion of point shaving, Mark investigates any connections to Rizzo. Though Bill refuses to speak, a guilt-wracked Doris agrees to meet him at his office that night. However, Doris commits suicide after leaving two notes that reveal Rizzo's crimes. Bill finds her body and the notes, taking them with him before either Rizzo or the police arrive. Bill meets Mark and Kerry at the office, but Rizzo and two of his men follow him. A fight breaks out, and Mark and Bill overpower the armed men. Rizzo is arrested and brought up on charges, Bill is reinstated on the basketball team, and Mark's journalism is lauded by the newspaper.

== Cast ==
- Stanley Clements as Mark Miller - Reporter
- Gloria Henry as Kerry Barker
- Ted de Corsia as Dino Rizzo
- Veda Ann Borg as Doris Burton
- Scotty Beckett as Bill Burton
- Mario Siletti as Dominic
- Carl Milletaire as 'Dutch' Gordon
- James Flavin as Al Bragg
- Hal Baylor as Augie Grotz
- Paul Bryar as Doc Allen
- Myron Healey as Jim O'Hara
- Greta Granstedt as Maid

== Bibliography ==
- Darby, William. Masters of Lens and Light: A Checklist of Major Cinematographers and Their Feature Films. Scarecrow Press, 1991.
