= Law of the Barbary Coast =

1949 film by Lew Landers

- Directed by: Lew Landers
- Written by: Robert Libott; Frank Burt
- Produced by: Wallace MacDonald
- Starring: Gloria Henry; Stephen Dunne; Adele Jergens; Robert Shayne; Stefan Schnabel
- Cinematography: Henry Freulich
- Edited by: Henry Batista
- Music by: Mischa Bakaleinikoff
- Production company: Columbia Pictures
- Distributed by: Columbia Pictures
- Release date: July 21, 1949
- Running time: 65 minutes
- Country: United States
- Language: English

Law of the Barbary Coast is a 1949 American historical crime Western film directed by Lew Landers and starring Gloria Henry, Stephen Dunne and Adele Jergens.

The film's sets were designed by the art director Harold H. MacArthur.

== Plot ==
After her brother is murdered in a saloon on the Barbary Coast in San Francisco, a woman goes undercover as a dance hall girl in order to gather evidence on the crime.

== Cast ==
- Gloria Henry as Julie Adams
- Stephen Dunne as Phil Morton
- Adele Jergens as Lita
- Ross Ford as Wayne Adams
- Robert Shayne as Michael Lodge
- Stefan Schnabel as Alexis Boralof
- J. Farrell MacDonald as Sergeant O'Leary
- Edwin Max as Arnold

== Bibliography ==
- Michael L. Stephens. Art Directors in Cinema: A Worldwide Biographical Dictionary. McFarland, 2008.
