= Johnny Holiday (film) =

Hollywood crime movie of 1949

- Theatrical release poster
- Directed by: Willis Goldbeck
- Screenplay by: Jack Andrews; Willis Goldbeck; Frederick Stephani
- Story by: R.W. Alcorn
- Produced by: R.W. Alcorn
- Starring: William Bendix; Stanley Clements; Hoagy Carmichael; Allen Martin Jr. Greta Granstedt; Herbert Newcomb
- Cinematography: Hal Mohr
- Edited by: Richard Fritch
- Music by: Franz Waxman
- Production company: Alcorn Productions
- Distributed by: United Artists
- Release date: November 18, 1949
- Running time: 92 minutes
- Country: United States
- Language: English
- Budget: $800,000
- Box office: $600,000 (domestic rentals estimate)

Johnny Holiday is a 1949 American crime film directed by Willis Goldbeck and written by Jack Andrews, Willis Goldbeck, and Frederick Stephani. The film stars William Bendix, Stanley Clements, Hoagy Carmichael, Allen Martin Jr., Greta Granstedt, and Herbert Newcomb. The film was released on November 18, 1949, by United Artists.

== Plot ==
Johnny Holiday (Allen Martin Jr) is a fatherless boy whose mother (Greta Granstedt) is ill in hospital. He hero-worships the psychopathic teenager Eddie Duggan (Stanley Clements). Protecting the thieving Duggan, Johnny is sent to a reformatory in Indiana, where he is taken under the wing of Sgt Walker (William Bendix), the bluff but kindly man in charge of the school farm. Walker asks for Holiday to be assigned to him when he realises that Holiday has a natural aptitude for caring for horses, as well as an innocent, sweet nature.

When Duggan turns up in the reformatory, he persuades Holiday to break out with him. At a Christmas entertainment featuring Indiana-born Hoagy Carmichael, Duggan strong-arms Holiday into an attempt at escape. Holiday faces an ethical choice between Duggan, his former hero, and Walker, who has stood by him and taken care of him, even secretly bringing him to visit his mother...

== Cast ==
- William Bendix as Sgt Walker
- Stanley Clements as Eddie Duggan
- Hoagy Carmichael as Hoagy Carmichael
- Allen Martin Jr as Johnny Holiday
- Greta Granstedt as Mrs Holiday
- Herbert Newcomb as Dr Piper
- Donald Gallagher as Supt Lang
- Jack Hagen as Jackson
- George Cisar as Barney Duggan
- Henry F. Schricker as Himself
- Leo Cleary as Trimble / Spenser
- Alma Platt as Miss Kelly
- Jean Juvelier as Mrs Bellini
- Buddy Cole as Buddy Cole
- Staff and Boys of the Indiana Boys School as Themselves
