= Sport of Kings (film) =

1947 film

- Directed by: Robert Gordon
- Written by: Gordon Grand (story); Edward Huebsch
- Produced by: William Bloom
- Starring: Paul Campbell; Gloria Henry; Harry Davenport
- Cinematography: Henry Freulich
- Edited by: Aaron Stell
- Music by: Mischa Bakaleinikoff
- Production company: Columbia Pictures
- Distributed by: Columbia Pictures
- Release date: June 26, 1947
- Running time: 68 minutes
- Country: United States
- Language: English

Sport of Kings is a 1947 American sports drama film directed by Robert Gordon and starring Paul Campbell, Gloria Henry and Harry Davenport. The film's sets were designed by the art director Charles Clague.

== Plot ==
Two young brothers move to Kentucky after inheriting their father's farm.

== Cast ==
- Paul Campbell as Tom Cloud
- Gloria Henry as Doc Richardson
- Harry Davenport as Maj. Denning
- Mark Dennis as Biff Cloud
- Harry Cheshire as Theodore McKeogh
- Clinton Rosemond as Josiah
- Louis Mason as Bertie
- Oscar O'Shea as Judge Sellers
- Ernest Anderson as Alf
- Eddy Chandler as Announcer
- Johnny Duncan as Jockey
- Al Eben as Moving Man
- Antonio Filauri as Barber
- Sam Flint as Chief Steward
- Robert Emmett Keane as Dr. Craig
- Michael Towne as Clerk
- Eddy Waller as Perkins

== Bibliography ==
- Goble, Alan. The Complete Index to Literary Sources in Film. Walter de Gruyter, 1999.
