= Riders in the Sky (film) =

1949 film by John English

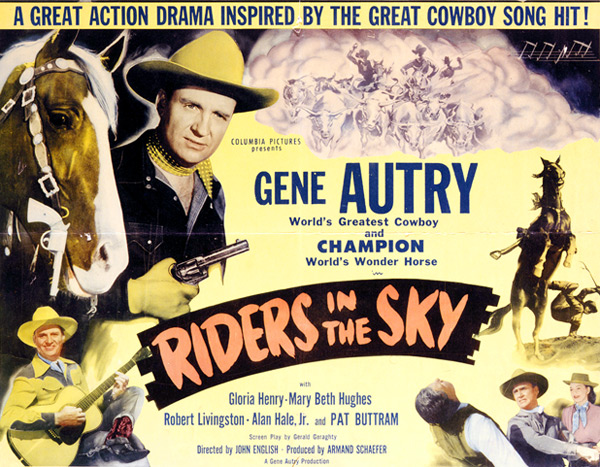
- Theatrical release poster
- Directed by: John English
- Screenplay by: Gerald Geraghty
- Based on: based upon a story by Herbert A. Woodbury
- Produced by: Armand Schaefer
- Starring: Gene Autry; Champion; Gloria Henry; Mary Beth Hughes; Robert Livingston; Alan Hale, Jr.; Pat Buttram
- Cinematography: William Bradford
- Edited by: Henry Batista
- Music by: Paul Mertz (musical supervisor)
- Production company: A Gene Autry Production
- Distributed by: Columbia Pictures Corporation
- Release date: November 29, 1949 (N.Y.C)
- Running time: 70 minutes
- Country: United States
- Language: English

Riders in the Sky is a 1949 American Western film directed by John English and starring and co-produced by Gene Autry; featuring Gloria Henry, and Pat Buttram. Based on the song by Stan Jones.

== Plot ==
Rancher Ralph Lawson is accused of murder, and Gene Autry attempts to clear his name.

== Cast ==
- Gene Autry as Gene Autry
- and Champion World's Wonder Horse
- Gloria Henry as Anne Lawson
- Mary Beth Hughes as Julie Stewart
- Robert Livingston as Rock McCleary
- Steve Darrell as Ralph Lawson
- Alan Hale, Jr. as Marshal Riggs
- Tom London as Old Man Roberts
- Pat Buttram as Chuckwalla

Note: Character names are not indicated in on-screen credits
