= Hot Shots (1956 film) =

1956 film by Jean Yarbrough

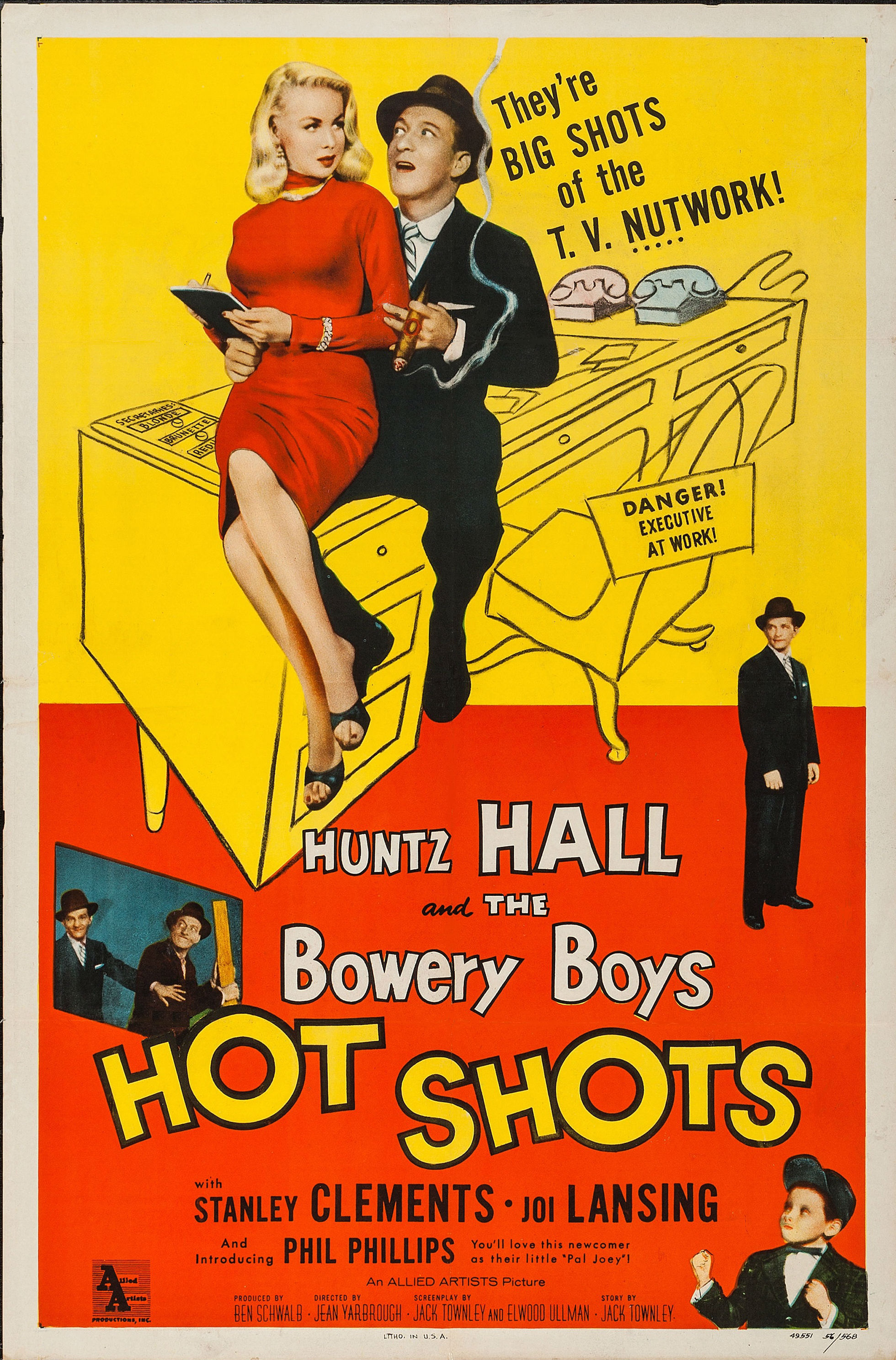
- Theatrical release poster
- Directed by: Jean Yarbrough
- Written by: Jack Townley
- Produced by: Ben Schwalb
- Starring: Huntz Hall
- Cinematography: Harry Neumann
- Edited by: Neil Brunnenkant
- Music by: Marlin Skiles
- Distributed by: Allied Artists Pictures
- Release date: December 23, 1956
- Running time: 61 minutes
- Country: United States
- Language: English

Hot Shots is a 1956 American comedy film directed by Jean Yarbrough and written by Jack Townley, starring The Bowery Boys in their 43rd feature film. The film was released on December 23, 1956 by Allied Artists.

== Plot ==
Joey Munroe, a bratty child television star, tries to steal the Bowery Boys' car. Duke and Sach catch him in the act, and learn that he was trying to escape from an unhappy home life with his guardians, and a boring professional life at the TV studio. Television executive P. M. Morley likes how well Duke and Sach handle the troublesome star, and employs them as junior executives. The crooked guardian has been stealing Joey's earnings, and resents Joey's new friends. He has them fired and then has Joey kidnapped for ransom to make up the financial shortage. The Bowery Boys trace the kidnappers to a maritime warehouse, where they rescue Joey.

== Cast ==
=== The Bowery Boys ===
- Huntz Hall as Horace Debussy "Sach" Jones
- Stanley Clements as Stanislaus "Duke" Coveleskie
- David Gorcey as Charles "Chuck" Anderson
- Jimmy Murphy as Myron

=== Supporting cast ===
- Phil Phillips as Joey Munroe
- Joi Lansing as Connie Forbes
- Queenie Smith as Mrs. Kate Kelly
- Robert Shayne as P.M. Morley
- Mark Dana as George Slater
- Henry Rowland as Karl
- Ray Walker as Capt. W. K. Wells
- Emory Parnell as B. L. Taylor, sponsor
- Isabel Randolph as Mrs. Taylor
- Dennis Moore as Tony, henchman

== Production ==
The film began production as Bringing Up Joey, which unfortunately coincided with a reissue of the Cary Grant-Katharine Hepburn comedy Bringing Up Baby (1938). The Bowery Boys title was changed to Hot Shots. Child actor Phil Phillips received a special introductory credit, leading at least one critic to surmise that Phillips would become a member of the Bowery Boys gang, but Hot Shots was one of only four screen credits for Phillips. He usually worked in television.

== Reception ==
The Bowery Boys pictures came out every three months, and by 1956 they were such predictable moneymakers that most trade publications saw no point in reviewing them anymore. A capsule review of Hot Shots was neutral: "Average Bowery Boys entry." In Britain, where the series was popular and still worthy of comment, Hot Shots was well received. Josh Billings of Kinematograph Weekly reported, "Jolly intermittent slapstick keeps the fun at near concert pitch. Huntz Hall is the only survivor of the original team (sic -- so was David Gorcey), but Stanley Clements, a live wire, and Phil Phillips, a supremely confident nipper, make up strength. Vigorously acted and more than adequately staged, it's good for a number of laughs. It not only ends on the right note, but at the right time."

== Home media ==
Warner Archives released the film on made-to-order DVD in the United States as part of the collection The Bowery Boys, Volume Three on October 1, 2013.

Preceded by Fighting Trouble; 1956	'The Bowery Boys' movies 1946-1958	Succeeded by Hold That Hypnotist; 1957
