= 'Neath Brooklyn Bridge =

1942 film by Wallace Fox

- Theatrical release poster
- Directed by: Wallace Fox
- Written by: Harvey Gates
- Produced by: Sam Katzman; Jack Dietz
- Starring: Leo Gorcey; Bobby Jordan; Huntz Hall; Gabriel Dell
- Cinematography: Mack Stengler
- Edited by: Carl Pierson
- Music by: Edward J. Kay
- Distributed by: Monogram Pictures Corporation
- Release date: November 20, 1942
- Running time: 61 minutes
- Country: United States

'Neath Brooklyn Bridge is a 1942 film released by Monogram Pictures. It is the eleventh installment in the East Side Kids series and one of the more dramatic films of the series, released at a time when they were making lighter, more humorous fare. The film is now in public domain and can be downloaded legally from numerous web sites.

== Plot ==
This time around, the East Side Kids, a gang of well-meaning young rough-necks in New York, are pulled into a murder mystery. They manage to rescue a young girl by the name of Sylvia from her violent stepfather Morley's abuse. Soon after, the stepfather is killed by a gangster called McGaffey for interfering with his racketeering operation by stealing his money.

Sylvia has taken refuge in the gang's hideout. One of the Kids, Danny, returns to her stepfather's apartment to bring some clothes for her. He is arrested by the police, suspected of the murder.

When McGaffey hears about the arrest he makes the gang a proposition. In exchange for the actual chair leg used by Mugs, president of the Kids, to hit Morley when the gang saved Sylvia, with Mugs' fingerprints, he wants them to break into a warehouse for him.

Danny fails to explain to his policeman brother how the killing of Morley happened. A former member of the Kids, Rusty, who is a sailor, comes to visit the boys in their hour of need. It turns out Sylvia's paralyzed grandfather had been in the apartment and had seen the murder when it happened. He can still communicate with the world through blinking. Rusty discovers that the grandfather blinks morse code, and interprets it, revealing that McGaffey is the killer.

Mugs comes forward, telling the rest of the gang about McGaffey's proposition. They decide to go to the warehouse, and Rusty takes Sylvia to the police station to tell them who the killer is and to get Danny out of jail. The Kids break into the warehouse by driving a truck through the doors and a brawl ensues. The police arrive at the scene and McGaffey and the rest of the gangsters are arrested.

== Cast ==
=== The East Side Kids ===
- Leo Gorcey as Muggs McGinnis
- Bobby Jordan as Danny Lyons
- Huntz Hall as Glimpy
- Sunshine Sammy Morrison as Scruno
- Stanley Clements as Stash
- Bobby Stone as Skinny

=== Remaining cast ===
- Gabriel Dell as Skid
- Noah Beery Jr. as Rusty
- Marc Lawrence as McGaffey
- Anne Gillis as Sylvia
- Dave O'Brien as Sergeant Lyons
- Jack Raymond as Sniffy
- Betty Wells as Dancer
- Dewey Robinson as Captain
- Patsy Moran as Mrs. Glimpy, Glimpy's mom
- Jack Mulhall as Sergeant
- Bud Osborne as Morley
- J. Arthur Young as "Bright Eyes"
- Franklyn Farnum as Policeman (uncredited)
- Jack Kenney as Police Officer Kenny (uncredited)
- Frank Moran as Mike, bartender (uncredited)
- George Morrell as Soup Customer (uncredited)
- 'Snub' Pollard as Soup Customer (uncredited)
- Betty Sinclair as Dress Saleswoman (uncredited)
