= Racing Luck (1948 film) =

1948 film by William A. Berke

- Directed by: William Berke
- Produced by: Sam Katzman
- Starring: Gloria Henry; Stanley Clements; David Bruce; Paula Raymond; Harry Cheshire; Dooley Wilson
- Cinematography: Ira H. Morgan
- Edited by: Henry Batista
- Production company: Sam Katzman Productions
- Distributed by: Columbia Pictures
- Release date: November 18, 1948
- Running time: 66 minutes
- Country: United States
- Language: English

Racing Luck is a 1948 American comedy romance sport film directed by William Berke and starring Gloria Henry.

== Plot ==
Saddled with debts after her father's death, Phyllis Warren's most valuable properties are a pair of thoroughbreds: Flasher, which her little brother "Boots" trains and rides, and Charm Boy, which doesn't seem to run well unless Flasher is in the same race.

Charm Boy is bought at a Santa Anita claiming race by rich trainer Jeff Stuart as a gift to Natalie Gunther, his sweetheart. Phyllis, not intending to part with the horse, persuades Jeff to return him, but Natalie sees a grateful Phyllis hug him, she keeps the horse and dumps her beau.

With a big stakes race coming up, Natalie discovers that Charm Boy won't run unless Flasher does as well. A wager is made that the winning trainer gets to keep both. A barn fire results in an injury to Boots, but he still manages to ride Flasher to victory and win Charm Boy back for his sister.

== Cast ==
- Gloria Henry as Phyllis Warren
- Stanley Clements as Boots Warren
- David Bruce as Jeff Stuart
- Paula Raymond as Natalie Gunther
- Harry Cheshire as Radcliffe Malone
- Dooley Wilson as Abe
- Jack Ingram as George

== Reception ==
Variety wrote that "Sam Katzman failed in his productional chores with a poor screenplay... and direction William Berke fails to give the pic a pace worthy of interest."

== See also ==
- List of films about horse racing
