= Crashing Las Vegas =

1956 film by Jean Yarbrough

- Directed by: Jean Yarbrough
- Written by: Jack Townley
- Produced by: Ben Schwalb
- Starring: Leo Gorcey; Huntz Hall; Mary Castle; David Gorcey; Jimmy Murphy; Doris Kemper
- Cinematography: Harry Neumann
- Edited by: George White
- Music by: Marlin Skiles
- Production company: Allied Artists Pictures
- Distributed by: Allied Artists Pictures
- Release date: April 22, 1956
- Running time: 62 minutes
- Country: United States
- Language: English

Crashing Las Vegas is a 1956 American comedy film directed by Jean Yarbrough and starring the comedy team The Bowery Boys. The film was released on April 22, 1956 by Allied Artists and is the 41st film in the series. It was the last of the series to star Leo Gorcey.

== Plot ==
The Bowery Boys' landlady Mrs. Kelly needs some money. Sach sustains an electric shock and gains the ability to predict numbers. Thanks to Sach's new power, the boys succeed on a TV game show and win a trip to Las Vegas, Nevada. Sach uses his power at the gambling tables, winning money for Mrs. Kelly. However, it's not too long before some curious gangsters want to get in on Sach's "secret." After the mobsters try to blackmail Hall with a badger game, the gang takes them on in a brawl. During the fracas, Sach's money literally flies out the window, but Mrs. Kelly has since won some prize money herself and no longer needs the gang's assistance.

== Cast ==
=== The Bowery Boys ===
- Leo Gorcey as Terence Aloysius "Slip" Mahoney
- Huntz Hall as Horace Debussy "Sach" Jones
- David Gorcey as Charles "Chuck" Anderson (credited as David Condon)
- Jimmy Murphy as Myron

=== Remaining cast ===
- Doris Kemper as Mrs. Kate Kelly
- Mary Castle as Carol LaRue
- Don Haggerty as Tony Murlock
- Terry Frost as Police Sergeant Kelly
- Mort Mills as Augie
- Jack Rice as Wiley, hotel desk clerk
- Nicky Blair as Sam

== Production ==
Crashing Las Vegas was Leo Gorcey's last Bowery Boys movie. He had a tough time trying to deal with the death of his father Bernard Gorcey, and began to drink heavily. Gorcey is visibly intoxicated in most of the finished film. After finishing production, Gorcey demanded an increase in his salary, but Allied Artists Pictures refused to do so. Leo quit the series as a result.

Longtime cast member Bennie Bartlett had just left the series, and was replaced by Jimmy Murphy. According to studio publicity, Murphy was working as a parking valet when he was discovered by Leo Gorcey. Gorcey felt that Murphy had a good face for the movies, and had him hired as a Bowery Boy.

With Bernard Gorcey's death, the locale of the series shifted from Louie's Sweet Shop to the gang's boardinghouse, managed by Irish landlady Mrs. Kate Kelly. In this film, she was played by Doris Kemper; for the next three films in the series, Queenie Smith would play the role.

== Reception ==
By 1956 most of the trade press stopped bothering with the Bowery Boys pictures. The films were such predictable moneymakers that there was no longer any reason to review them; one was about as good as another as a useful filler on double-feature programs. The Exhibitor summed up Crashing Las Vegas: "Usual Bowery Boys series nonsense for usual audience." One theater manager, Moz Burles, noticed Leo Gorcey's tipsy performance and advised the studio: "From acting, would say this is Gorcey's last. This is a good series and they could play up the gags to be just a bit more mature and start all over again with Hall." That's exactly what happened: the studio dropped Gorcey and rebooted the series with Hall, and the gang members grew up, trading their casual sweaters for jackets and neckties.

== Home media ==
Warner Archives released the film on made-to-order DVD in the United States as part of "The Bowery Boys, Volume Three" on October 1, 2013.

Preceded by Dig That Uranium; 1956	'The Bowery Boys' movies 1946-1958	Succeeded by Fighting Trouble; 1956
