= Fighting Trouble =

1956 film by George Blair

- Directed by: George Blair
- Written by: Elwood Ullman
- Produced by: Ben Schwalb
- Starring: Huntz Hall; Stanley Clements; David Gorcey; Danny Welton; Queenie Smith
- Cinematography: Harry Neumann
- Edited by: William Austin
- Music by: Buddy Bregman
- Production company: Allied Artists Pictures
- Distributed by: Allied Artists Pictures
- Release date: September 16, 1956
- Running time: 61 minutes
- Country: United States
- Language: English

Fighting Trouble is a 1956 American comedy film directed by George Blair and starring The Bowery Boys. It was released on September 16, 1956, by Allied Artists. The 42nd film in the Bowery Boys series, it was the first to feature Stanley Clements.

== Plot ==
Gangster Frankie Arbo has imported a master engraver to produce counterfeit money. Arbo buys a nightclub, The Hula Hut, as a front for his criminal activities. A newspaper editor wants a photo of the elusive Arbo, and hires Sach and Duke to produce it. They adopt several disguises to catch Arbo off guard. When Arbo's confederate Handsome Hal Lomax hits town, the Bowery Boys intercept him and pose as gangsters themselves, hiding Lomax out at Kate Kelly's boardinghouse. Meanwhile, Sach -- with hidden camera handy -- poses as Lomax and has an audience with Arbo, but Sach's cover is blown when Lomax's girlfriend shows up. Sach's pals Duke, Chuck, and Danny battle the gangsters and keep Sach out of harm's way until the police arrive.

== Cast ==
=== The Bowery Boys ===
- Huntz Hall as Horace Debussy "Sach" Jones
- Stanley Clements as Stanislaus "Duke" Coveleskie
- David Gorcey as Charles "Chuck" Anderson (credited as David Condon)
- Danny Welton as Danny

=== Supporting cast ===
- Adele Jergens as Mae Randall
- Queenie Smith as Mrs. Kate Kelly
- Thomas Browne Henry as Frankie Arbo
- Tim Ryan as Ray Vance, editor
- Joe Downing as Handsome Hal Lomax
- Laurie Mitchell as Dolly Tate
- Charles Williams as Smoggy Smith
- Rick Vallin as Vic Savini

== Production ==
The working title was Chasing Trouble. The studio had already used this title in 1940 for a Frankie Darro feature and, with the older Darro film now in television distribution, the new Bowery Boys film was renamed Fighting Trouble to avoid confusion.

Allied Artists had already agreed to supply exhibitors with four new Bowery Boys comedies for the year. Only one had been made (Crashing Las Vegas) when Leo Gorcey withdrew from the series, so the studio was obliged to fulfill the contracts with three more films, all of which were announced to the trade in September 1956. The group was now known as "Huntz Hall and the Bowery Boys". Fighting Trouble marked the first appearance of Sach's new sidekick Stanislaus "Duke" Coveleskie, played by Stanley Clements. Other cast changes include Queenie Smith taking over the role of landlady Mrs. Kelly, and the addition of Danny Welton in his only appearance as a member of the gang.

Both Hall and Clements had considerable input in casting the film. Hall coaxed both Adele Jergens and Tim Ryan out of retirement to lend support to his first lead, and arranged for Joe Downing (who had appeared in the original Dead End play two decades before) to appear as a shady hypochondriac. Clements recruited Danny Welton, who (under his real name, Myron Welton) had co-starred with Clements in the 1950 teen-gang drama Military Academy with That Tenth Avenue Gang.

The usual stock theme music and background score by Marlin Skiles was dispensed with for this one picture. Twenty-six-year-old Buddy Bregman, then in the news for arranging and conducting a platinum-selling Bing Crosby record album, had just furnished the score for the studio's Crime in the Streets (1956). Bregman composed and conducted an original jazz-oriented score for this new Bowery Boys comedy, but returned to the recording studio for other projects. The familiar Marlin Skiles music returned for the remainder of the Bowery Boys series.

== Reception ==
Surprisingly, the trade press paid scant attention to Leo Gorcey's departure. By this time the Bowery Boys brand name was familiar enough to sell Fighting Trouble to theaters and drive-ins, and the films were so predictably successful in the marketplace that customers already knew what to expect. Thus many trade journals didn't bother to review the Bowery Boys pictures anymore, and those that did simply remarked "lower half filler" or "series average". The Exhibitor was blunt: "The Bowery Boys ain't what they used to be. In fact, the current entry is merely filler for the lower half [of double-feature programs] in nondiscriminating spots. It is more ridiculous than funny and the antics are more silly than anything else." The review in Picturegoer didn't mention either Gorcey or Clements: "You just can't keep the Bowery Boys down. Huntz Hall is in top form and the rest of the cast play up to him." Only one surviving review noted Gorcey's absence: "Needless to say that Hall is in his element as an amateur photographer. We did miss Leo Gorcey, who, for some freak of casting, is out of the group."

== Home media ==
Warner Archives released the film on made-to-order DVD in the United States as part of "The Bowery Boys, Volume Four" on August 26, 2014.

== See also ==
- List of American films of 1956

Preceded by Crashing Las Vegas; 1956	'The Bowery Boys' movies 1946-1958	Succeeded by Hot Shots; 1956
