= Jean Yarbrough =

American film director (1900–1975)

- Born: August 22, 1900; Marianna, Arkansas, U.S.
- Died: August 2, 1975 (aged 74); Los Angeles, California, U.S.
- Occupation: Film director

Jean Yarbrough (August 22, 1900 – August 2, 1975) was an American film director who directed a majority of Abbott and Costello films.

== Biography ==
Jean Yarbrough was born in Marianna, Arkansas on August 22, 1900. He attended the University of the South in Sewanee, Tennessee. In 1922, Yarbrough entered the film business working in silent pictures, first as a "prop man" and later rising through the ranks to become an assistant director.

By 1936, he became a director, first doing comedy and musical shorts for RKO. His directorial debut for a feature-length film was Rebellious Daughters, made by the low-budget studio Progressive Pictures in 1938.

His success came in the 1940s and 1950s when he directed comedy teams like Abbott and Costello (five films: Here Come the Co-Eds, In Society, Jack and the Beanstalk, Lost in Alaska, and The Naughty Nineties), The Bowery Boys (five films: Angels in Disguise, Master Minds, Triple Trouble, Crashing Las Vegas, and Hot Shots) and horror/cult movies, such as The Devil Bat, King of the Zombies, She-Wolf of London, and House of Horrors.

Yarbrough made the transition from B-movies to television. He directed many episodes for different TV series throughout the 1950s and 1960s. In addition to directing, he worked as both producer and director of the popular Abbott and Costello Show. He directed some episodes of The Silent Service and Navy Log, also during the 1950s.

He directed episodes of Walter Brennan's series The Guns of Will Sonnett and The Addams Family. His last theatrical film was 1967's Hillbillys in a Haunted House, a mixture of comedy horror and country music, starring Basil Rathbone and Lon Chaney Jr.

== Partial filmography ==
- The Devil Bat (1940)
- King of the Zombies (1941)
- The Gang's All Here (1941)
- Father Steps Out (1941)
- Let's Go Collegiate (1941)
- Caught in the Act (1941)
- Good Morning, Judge (1943)
- In Society (1944)
- Moon Over Las Vegas (1944)
- Here Come The Co-Eds (1945)
- The Naughty Nineties (1945)
- House of Horrors (1946)
- Inside Job (1946)
- She-Wolf of London (1946)
- Cuban Pete (1946)
- The Brute Man (1946)
- Shed No Tears (1948)
- The Creeper (1948)
- The Challenge (1948)
- Holiday in Havana (1949)
- Sideshow (1950)
- According to Mrs. Hoyle (1951)
- Jack and the Beanstalk (1952)
- Lost in Alaska (1952)
- Crashing Las Vegas (1956)
- The Women of Pitcairn Island (1956)
- Footsteps in the Night (1957)
- Saintly Sinners (1962)
- Hillbillys in a Haunted House (1967)
- The Over-the-Hill Gang (1969) TV movie
