= Queenie Smith =

American actress (1898–1978)

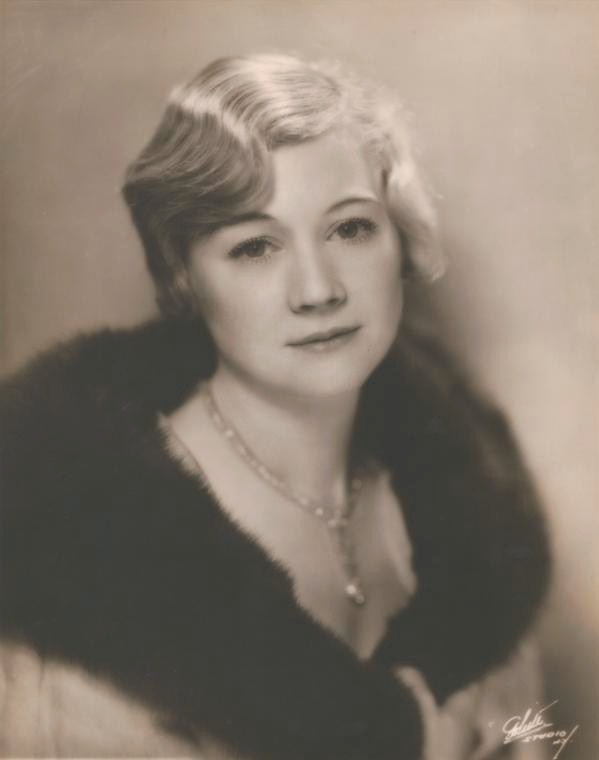
- Smith in 1920
- Born: Anna Miriam Smith; September 8, 1899; New York City, U.S.
- Died: August 5, 1978 (aged 78); Burbank, California, U.S.
- Occupations: Ballet dancer, actress
- Years active: 1915–1978
- Spouse: Robert Garland (m. 1931; div. 1937)

Anna Miriam "Queenie" Smith (September 8, 1899 – August 5, 1978) was an American ballet dancer, and a stage, television, and film actress. In later life she became a talent agent. She is best known for her Southern-belle character roles in the W. C. Fields-Bing Crosby film Mississippi (1935) and the Irene Dunne-Allan Jones musical Show Boat (1936); her role as Jimmy Durante's wife in the Christmas perennial The Great Rupert (1950); and for her appearances as The Bowery Boys' Irish landlady (1956–57).

== Life and career ==
Born Anna Miriam Smith (Note: As per New York City birth records. In light of the article detailing Gatti-Casazza's comments upon first witnessing Smith in class (i.e. "That little fat girl there! Why haven't you told me about her?"), it becomes clear that the stage name "Queenie" was simply a somewhat dubious term of 'endearment' (presumably the brainchild of Smith's British-born father), likening Anna to the like-named, famously corpulent British Queen who reigned over assorted parts—and eventually the whole—of Great Britain during the first two decades of the eighteenth Century.) in New York City, on September 8, 1899, Smith was one of at least four (three daughters and one son), born to recently transplanted San Antonians, Emma (née Koenigheim) and Charles Smith.

Smith got an early start, studying at the Metropolitan Opera's ballet school and spent her teen years performing as a dancer with the Metropolitan Opera Company in operas such as Aida, La Traviata, and Faust.

In September 1919, shortly after her 20th birthday, Smith made the transition to musical comedy at New York's Knickerbocker Theatre, making her Broadway debut as Ida Loring in Roly Boly Eyes. Her other Broadway credits included the part of Tillie Olsen in Rudolf Friml's musical Cinders, and roles in Helen of Troy, New York (1923), Sitting Pretty (1924), and The Street Singer (1929). Her last Broadway credit was in 1934, for a two-month run of the play Every Thursday.

She journeyed west to try her luck in motion pictures. After being featured in the Lillian Roth musical featurette Masks and Memories (1934), she was cast as a showboat entertainer in Mississippi. She costarred in the 1936 Universal Pictures film version of Jerome Kern's Show Boat, playing Ellie May Chipley. Smith replaced stage actress Eva Puck, who had starred as Chipley in the 1927 premiere and 1932 revival of Show Boat.

Apart from a single feature film in 1939, she made no screen appearances until 1946, when she began playing character roles on film, and later, television. She was seen in guest shots on many television shows, usually playing feisty old ladies, in The Hardy Boys/Nancy Drew Mysteries, A.E.S. Hudson Street, Rhoda, Dawn: Portrait of a Teenage Runaway, Barney Miller, Mother, Jugs & Speed, Chico and the Man, McMillan & Wife, Love American Style, The Waltons, Here's Lucy, The Funny Side, Hawaii Five-O, The Monkees, The Odd Couple, The Love Boat, Maude, and Little House on the Prairie (in a recurring role as Mrs. Whipple).

Smith was a teacher and mentor to many young actors. She taught at the Hollywood Professional School and was the director for the training program at Melodyland Theater in Anaheim, California, during the 1960s. She also established a talent agency.

She worked until the year of her death, her last role being Elsie in the Chevy Chase-Goldie Hawn film Foul Play. (1978).

== Personal life and death ==
Smith married drama critic Robert Garland on May 17, 1931. They were divorced on April 30, 1937. She died of cancer at age 78.

== Partial filmography ==
- John Halifax, Gentleman (1915) – Minor Role (uncredited)
- Mississippi (1935) – Alabam
- Special Agent K-7 (1936) – Ollie O'Dea
- Show Boat (1936) – Elly May Chipley
- On Your Toes (1939) – Mrs. Dolan
- From This Day Forward (1946) – Mrs. Beesley
- The Killers (1946) – Mary Ellen 'Queenie' Daugherty (uncredited)
- Nocturne (1946) – Queenie
- The Long Night (1947) – Mrs. Tully
- Sleep, My Love (1948) – Mrs. Grace Vernay
- The Snake Pit (1948) – Lola
- Massacre River (1949) – Mrs. Johanssen
- The Great Rupert (1950) – Mrs. Amendola
- Caged (1950) – Mrs. Warren – Marie's Mother (uncredited)
- Union Station (1950) – Landlady (uncredited)
- Prisoners in Petticoats (1950) – Beatrice
- Emergency Wedding (1950) – Rose – Reno Hotel Maid (uncredited)
- Belle Le Grand (1951) – Anna (uncredited)
- The First Legion (1951) – Henrietta
- When Worlds Collide (1951) – Matron with Cigarette (uncredited)
- The Greatest Show on Earth (1952) – Spectator (uncredited)
- My Sister Eileen (1955) – Alice – Baker's Secretary (uncredited)
- Fighting Trouble (1956) – Miss Kate Kelly
- You Can't Run Away from It (1956) – Elderly Lady
- Hot Shots (1956) – Mrs. Kate Kelly
- Hold That Hypnotist (1957) – Kate Kelly
- Sweet Smell of Success (1957) – Mildred Tam (uncredited)
- The Legend of Lylah Clare (1968) – Hairdresser
- The Day of the Locust (1975) – Palsied Lady
- Hustle (1975) – Customer #1
- Mother, Jugs & Speed (1976) – (uncredited)
- Invisible Strangler (1978) – Darlene's Landlady
- The End (1978) – Old Lady in Car
- Foul Play (1978) – Elsie (final film role)

== Television ==
Year	Title	Role	Notes
1967	The Monkees	Mrs. Filchok	S2:E4, "Monkee Mayor"

She played Mrs Whipple in the Little House on the Prairie.
