= Foreign agent (disambiguation) =

A foreign agent is a person who carries out the interests of a foreign country.

Foreign agent may also refer to:

- Foreign sales agent, a foreign representative of a company
- In the United States, an entity registered under the Foreign Agents Registration Act
- In Russia, an entity registered under the Russian foreign agent law
- Foreign body, in an organism
- A type of router used in Mobile IP
- Foreign Agent, a 1942 American film
