= Mr. Celebrity (1941 film) =

1941 film

- Directed by: William Beaudine
- Screenplay by: Martin Mooney
- Story by: Martin Mooney; Charles Samuels
- Produced by: Martin Mooney
- Starring: Buzzy Henry; James Seay; Doris Day; Francis X. Bushman; Clara Kimball Young; Jim Jeffries
- Cinematography: Arthur Martinelli A.S.C.
- Edited by: Robert Crandall
- Production company: A Producers Releasing Corporation Picture
- Distributed by: Producers Releasing Corporation
- Release date: October 10, 1941
- Running time: 67 minutes
- Country: United States
- Language: English

Mr. Celebrity is a 1941 American sports comedy film directed by William Beaudine and starring Buzzy Henry, James Seay and Doris Day, with Francis X. Bushman, Clara Kimball Young and Jim Jeffries as themselves.

== Cast ==
- Buzzy Henry as Danny Mason
- James Seay as Jim Kane
- Doris Day as Carol Carter
- William Halligan as Daniel Mason
- Gavin Gordon as Travers
- Laura Treadwell as Mrs. Mason
- John Ince as Joe Farrell
- Johnny Berkes as Johnny Martin
- Larry Grey as Cardo the Great

and featuring as themselves

- Francis X. Bushman
- Clara Kimball Young
- Jim Jeffries

== See also ==
- List of films about horses
- List of films about horse racing
