= She Done Him Right =

She Done Him Right may refer to:

- She Done Him Right (1933 film), a short animated cartoon
- She Done Him Right (1940 film), an American comedy film
