= Lawrence Grey =

Lawrence Grey may refer to:

- Lawrence Grey (judge), of Ohio Supreme Court elections
- Lawrence Grey (magician) (1894–1951), magician
- Lawrence Grey (producer), Canadian-American film and television producer

== See also ==
- Lawrence Gray (disambiguation)
