= Little Annie Rooney (1925 film) =

1925 film

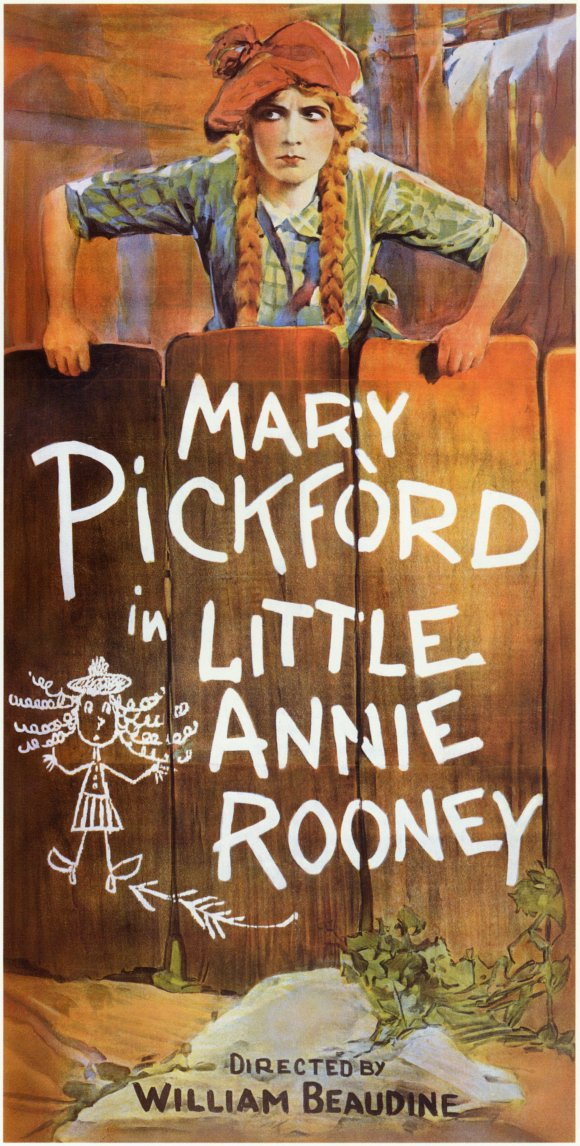
- Theatrical release poster
- Directed by: William Beaudine
- Written by: Mary Pickford (story) (as Catherine Hennessey); Hope Loring; Louis Lighton
- Produced by: Mary Pickford
- Starring: Mary Pickford; William Haines
- Cinematography: Charles Rosher; Hal Mohr
- Distributed by: United Artists
- Release date: October 18, 1925
- Running time: 95 minutes
- Country: United States
- Language: Silent (English intertitles)
- Box office: $1,100,000

The full film

Little Annie Rooney is a 1925 American silent comedy-drama film starring Mary Pickford and directed by William Beaudine. Pickford, one of the most successful actresses of the silent era, was best known throughout her career for her iconic portrayals of penniless young girls. After generating only modest box office revenue playing adults in her previous two films, Pickford wrote and produced Little Annie Rooney to cater to silent film audiences. Though she was 33 years old, Pickford played the title role, an Irish girl living in the slums of New York City.

The film was a critical and commercial success, becoming one of the highest-grossing films of 1925. Restored by the Academy of Motion Picture Arts and Sciences in 2014, Little Annie Rooney is remembered today for Pickford's performance and the high quality associated with its production.

== Plot ==
Annie Rooney is a young girl who spends her days wreaking havoc in the tenements with a gang of children and their rival gang, the Kid Kellys. They fight in the streets, accidentally scaring a fruit vendor's horse in the process. Annie's father is a respected neighborhood police officer, but her brother, Tim, is a member of the Big Kellys, a gang of older boys led by Joe Kelly. The gang raises money for themselves by selling tickets to an upcoming dance.

Joe is kind to Annie and she develops a crush on him. But when Joe visits the Rooney home later that day, Officer Rooney warns him that if he continues to lead his gang, he will no longer allow Tim to spend time with Joe.

The fruit vendor arrives and informs Officer Rooney that Annie's activities that morning cost him five dollars' worth of fresh fruit. When each of the children claim responsibility for scaring the horse, Officer Rooney decides that they will all have to repay the fruit vendor together.

The children decide to raise funds by staging a play set in the Wild West. Prompted by teasing from a heckler, Annie attempts to ride the same horse that the children had scared earlier, but it is spooked once again and gallops through the city with Annie on its back. Joe spots Annie and manages to catch her when she falls. When the fruit vendor catches up with them, Joe pays him back with five dollars' worth of tickets to the dance.

The night of the dance is also Officer Rooney's birthday; he is on patrol outside the dance hall. Back at home, Tim and Annie are preparing for their father's return. At the dance, a fight breaks out between Joe and two of his fellow gang members, Tony and Spider. The lights in the dance hall are switched off, attracting the attention of Officer Rooney, who ventures inside. Tony fires a gun, but the bullet meant for Joe hits Officer Rooney instead, killing him.

A week passes. The police still haven't discovered Officer Rooney's killer. Tony and Spider lie to Tim, telling him that Joe killed Officer Rooney. Tim intends to take revenge himself.

Meanwhile, Annie is told that Tony was seen discarding a gun in an alley. Members of the Kid Kellys begin to suspect Tony as well. The rival gangs unite and manage to bring Tony to the police station, but Tim arrives shortly after them and announces that he has just shot Joe.

Annie rushes to the hospital and learns that Joe will die unless he is given an immediate blood transfusion. Annie volunteers, though she mistakenly believes that she will die as a result. She is tested and donates her blood. After the procedure, Annie learns that she is not going to die, and she states her intention to marry Joe one day.

Later, Joe drives Annie and her friends through town. Tim, now a traffic officer, waves them through the intersection.

== Cast ==
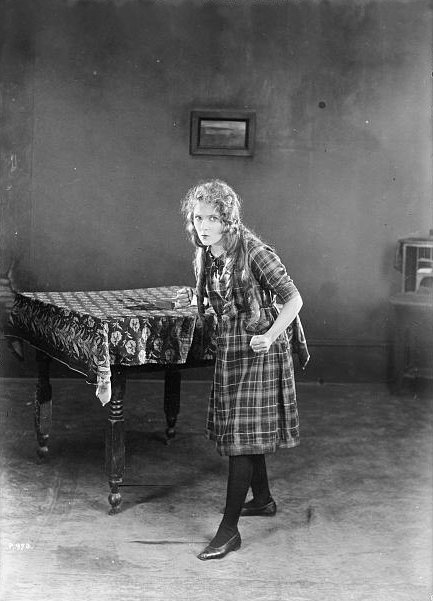
Pickford as Annie Rooney

- Mary Pickford as Annie "Little Annie" Rooney
- William Haines as Joe Kelly
- Walter James as Officer Rooney
- Gordon Griffith as Tim Rooney
- Carlo Schipa as Tony
- Spec O'Donnell as Abie
- Hugh Fay as "Spider"
- Vola Vale as Mamie
- Joe Butterworth as Mickey
- Oscar Rudolph as Athos
- Eugene Jackson as Humidor

== Production ==
An official film trailer

"America's Sweetheart" Mary Pickford had built a successful career playing young ragamuffins, but was interested in playing roles that were more appropriate for her age. She was perhaps the most powerful woman in Hollywood at the time, and as one of the founders of United Artists, she was able to produce and star in films like Rosita and Dorothy Vernon of Haddon Hall. However, audiences were still clamoring for Pickford to return to screens as "the girl with the curls". In a 1925 interview with Photoplay magazine, she asked her fans what roles they would like to see her play; Photoplay received 20,000 letters in reply urging her to portray children, with suggestions including Anne of Green Gables, Heidi, and Alice in Wonderland. Despite being 33 years old, Pickford acquiesced to her public's wishes, once again stepping into the role of a young girl for Little Annie Rooney.

The idea for the film's subject – a tough Irish girl from the streets – came to Pickford as she was wandering through a vacant city set on a Hollywood backlot. Seeking advice from a distinctly Irish-American perspective, she called Mabel Normand, who simply suggested, "I'd get an Irish title... and write something to go with it."

Pickford selected the hit music hall song "Little Annie Rooney" as the basis for her character. The song is referenced twice in the movie's intertitles; written in 1889 but now largely forgotten, it was very popular at the time, also inspiring a comic strip and an animated short film. Pickford wrote the story herself, credited under the name of her Irish grandmother, Catherine Hennessey.

To help realize her story, Pickford hired some of the top-tier talent of the day: husband-and-wife screenwriting team Hope Loring and Louis Lighton, who also wrote Wings and It, adapted the story for the screen; Charles Rosher, who would later win an Academy Award for Sunrise, served as the film's cinematographer; William Beaudine, who had found much success working with children in films like Boy of Mine and Penrod and Sam, was chosen by Pickford to direct.

Little Annie Rooney probably owes a debt to the Our Gang franchise for its comedic cast of multi-ethnic children (including Irish, Greek, Jewish, Italian, Chinese, and African-American characters), but Little Annie Rooney takes place in a far grittier urban setting. One of the advertisements for the film identifies Annie as "the Princess of the Bowery", an area home to many immigrant populations at the time and known as the skid row of New York until the 1980s. An enormous set filled with realistic details was constructed in the Pickford-Fairbanks backlot to simulate the impoverished downtown neighborhood.

== Legacy ==
Pickford's return as a scruffy young girl in Little Annie Rooney was a critical success as well as a triumph at the box office, becoming one of the highest-grossing films of 1925. This film was a particular achievement for Pickford after the lukewarm reception given to her previous two starring efforts. Pickford biographer Eileen Whitfield wrote, "One watches in amazement as Pickford, at thirty-three, fresh from the seductions of Rosita and the stiff declamations of Dorothy Vernon, slips into the body of a twelve-year-old tomboy."

Little Annie Rooney was restored by the Academy Film Archive in 2014 from Pickford's own 35mm tinted nitrate print; the result contains longer scenes, different camera set-ups, and better shots of her, as well as special tinting effects not seen in any previously available versions. This restoration, with a new score composed by Andy Gladbach, has been presented at college campuses, by the American Cinematheque at Grauman's Egyptian Theatre, at the Academy of Motion Picture Arts and Sciences' annual "Mary Pickford Celebration of Silent Film", and on Turner Classic Movies.

Writing in his program notes for the restoration's premiere, Jeffrey Vance observed: "Little Annie Rooney has always been overshadowed by the films that have chronologically surrounded it. The Academy Film Archive's restoration of Little Annie Rooney reveals the work to be one of her most accomplished efforts and a fine introduction to the art of Mary Pickford."

Kevin Brownlow wrote of the film, "when you think that it was all shot on the Pickford-Fairbanks backlot... it is all the more remarkable... All the artistry, technical skill, and emotional impact of a medium only thirty years old shine triumphantly through."
