= Harry Cheshire =

American character actor (1891–1968)

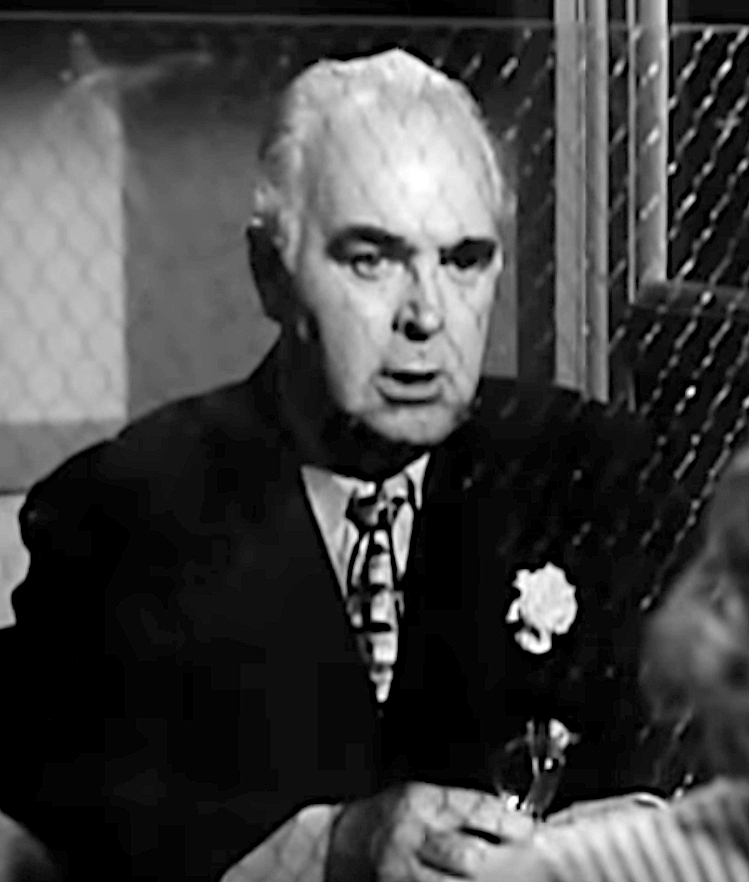
- Cheshire in Impact (1949)
- Born: Harry V. Cheshire; August 16, 1891; Emporia, Kansas, U.S.
- Died: June 16, 1968 (aged 76); Orange County, California, U.S.
- Resting place: Forest Lawn Memorial Park, Hollywood Hills
- Occupation: Actor
- Years active: 1940–1964
- Known for: Judge Ben Wiley on Buffalo Bill, Jr. Judge Trager on Lawman
- Spouse: Myrtle Cheshire

Harry V. Cheshire (August 16, 1891 – June 16, 1968), originally from Emporia, Kansas, was an American character actor who appeared in over 100 films, mostly playing small roles. He was also a stage actor and performed on a St. Louis radio station's musical program. He may be best known for playing Judge Ben Wiley on Buffalo Bill, Jr.

== Early career ==
Cheshire began his show business career in 1908, entertaining the audience between reels of short silent movies at the Old Nickelodeon Theater in Kansas City. He was active in stage work with the Hi Jinks Company and Liberty Players acting troupes during the 1920s and 1930s.

He acquired the nickname Pappy after appearing as Pappy Cheshire with his Hilly Billy Band on the St. Louis radio station KMOX.

== Film and television work ==
Cheshire's first film role was as Pappy Cheshire in the 1940 Republic Pictures' musical Barnyard Follies. He was the minister who marries George Bailey (James Stewart) and Mary Hatch (Donna Reed) in It's a Wonderful Life, and played small-town judges in the westerns Sioux City Sue, The Fabulous Texan and Carbine Williams. He played Doctor Gray in Adventures of Gallant Bess. In 1955, during a two-week break from filming episodes of the television series Buffalo Bill, Jr., Cheshire was able to fit in a supporting role in the film Soldier of Fortune.

In addition to playing judges in films, Cheshire also played characters following the same occupation on two television series. From 1955 - 1956 he was Judge "Fair and Square" Ben Wiley in the syndicated western television series, Buffalo Bill, Jr.. From 1958-1962 he was Judge Traeger in episodes of the Lawman.

He guest starred in other television programs, including The Lone Ranger, Annie Oakley, The Gene Autry Show, The George Burns and Gracie Allen Show, I Love Lucy and The Red Skelton Show.

One writer stated that Cheshire had the ability "to appear genial and grumpy at the same time."

== Personal life ==
Harry Cheshire was married to Myrtle Cheshire. They had two children, son Harry Jr. and daughter Leona, and in February 1968 the couple celebrated their 50th wedding anniversary. Cheshire died in 1968. He is interred at Forest Lawn Memorial Park in the Hollywood Hills of Los Angeles.

== Selected filmography ==
- Barnyard Follies (1940) - Pappy
- Hi, Neighbor (1942) - Professor Edgar Boggs
- Swing Your Partner (1943) - Harry 'Pappy' Cheshire
- O, My Darling Clementine (1943) - 'Pappy' Cheshire
- Sing, Neighbor, Sing (1944) - Dean Cheshire
- Drifting Along (1946) - Bart Holden (uncredited)
- Smooth as Silk (1946) - Wolcott
- Traffic in Crime (1946) - Dan Marlowe
- Big Town (1946) - Police Chief Masters (uncredited)
- If I'm Lucky (1946) - Phil Gargan, State Engineer (uncredited)
- Child of Divorce (1946) - Judge
- Affairs of Geraldine (1946) - Judge Fricke
- Sioux City Sue (1946) - Mayor Tussie of Whispering Rock (uncredited)
- The Best Years of Our Lives (1946) - Minister at Wedding (uncredited)
- Dick Tracy vs. Cueball (1946) - Jules Sparkle (uncredited)
- It's a Wonderful Life (1946) - Dr. Campbell (uncredited)
- The Luckiest Guy in the World (1947, Short) - Mr. Mossley
- The Pilgrim Lady (1947) - Dr. Bekins
- Code of the West (1947) - Judge Culver (uncredited)
- Shoot to Kill (1947) - Mike Blake
- Lost Honeymoon (1947) - Judge Henderson (uncredited)
- Danger Street (1947) - Commissioner (uncredited)
- The Homestretch (1947) - Colonel Albright (uncredited)
- Sport of Kings (1947) - Theodore McKeogh
- Springtime in the Sierras (1947) - Cap Foster
- The Hucksters (1947) - Joe Lorrison, Lawyer (uncredited)
- I Wonder Who's Kissing Her Now (1947) - Stage Manager (uncredited)
- Mother Wore Tights (1947) - Minister (uncredited)
- Nightmare Alley (1947) - Mr. Prescott (uncredited)
- The Invisible Wall (1947) - Eugene Hamilton
- The Fabulous Texan (1947) - Judge Gavin (uncredited)
- Her Husband's Affairs (1947) - Mayor Jim Dandy Harker (uncredited)
- The Flame (1947) - The Minister
- The Tender Years (1948) - Sheriff Fred Ackley
- Slippy McGee (1948) - Dr. Moore
- Here Comes Trouble (1948) - Judge J.J. Bellinger (uncredited)
- Mr. Reckless (1948) - Doctor at Wedding (uncredited)
- Ruthless (1948) - Lawyer Nevin (uncredited)
- Sixteen Fathoms Deep (1948) - Uncle Mike
- The Babe Ruth Story (1948) - Cap Huston (uncredited)
- Northwest Stampede (1948) - Rodeo Judge (uncredited)
- Night Wind (1948) - Judge Thorgeson (uncredited)
- For the Love of Mary (1948) - Colonel Hedley
- Moonrise (1948) - J.B. Sykes
- Incident (1948) - T.A. Hartley
- Racing Luck (1948) - Radcliffe Malone
- Smoky Mountain Melody (1948) - Doc Moffitt
- Adventures of Gallant Bess (1948) - Dr. Gray
- The Lucky Stiff (1949) - Prison Warden (uncredited)
- The Clay Pigeon (1949) - Doctor (uncredited)
- Riders of the Whistling Pines (1949) - Dr. Daniel Chadwick
- Impact (1949) - Irene's Attorney
- Ma and Pa Kettle (1949) - Fletcher (uncredited)
- It Happens Every Spring (1949) - Team Doctor X-Raying King's Hand (uncredited)
- Air Hostess (1949) - Dr. Lee
- Anna Lucasta (1949) - Minister (uncredited)
- Sand (1949) - Logan (uncredited)
- Brimstone (1949) - Calvin Willis
- Miss Grant Takes Richmond (1949) - Leo Hopkins (uncredited)
- The Woman on Pier 13 (1949) - J. Francis Cornwall
- Fighting Man of the Plains (1949) - Lanyard
- Chicago Deadline (1949) - Minister (uncredited)
- Bride for Sale (1949) - Haskins (uncredited)
- The Lady Takes a Sailor (1949) - Judge Vardon (uncredited)
- Paid in Full (1950) - Minister (uncredited)
- Girls' School (1950) - Calhoun Robie
- A Woman of Distinction (1950) - Train Steward (uncredited)
- Square Dance Katy (1950) - Kimbrough
- The Arizona Cowboy (1950) - David Carson
- No Sad Songs for Me (1950) - Mel Fenelly (uncredited)
- Lucky Losers (1950) - John W. 'Chick' Martin
- County Fair (1950) - Auctioneer
- September Affair (1950) - Jim (uncredited)
- Lonely Heart Bandits (1950) - Sheriff Polk
- Chain Gang (1950) - Henry 'Pop' O'Donnell
- Let's Dance (1950) - Man (uncredited)
- Again... Pioneers (1950) - Colonel Garnett
- The Flying Missile (1950) - First Senator (uncredited)
- The Company She Keeps (1951) - Cliff Martin, Larry's Boss (uncredited)
- Blue Blood (1951) - McArthur
- Thunder in God's Country (1951) - Mayor Larkin
- As Young as You Feel (1951) - Chamber of Commerce President (uncredited)
- Rhubarb (1951) - Mr. Seegle, Board Member (uncredited)
- Bannerline (1951) - Mayor Ducat (uncredited)
- The Family Secret (1951) - Dr. Black, Coroner (uncredited)
- Here Come the Nelsons (1952) - Bronco Riding Event Announcer (uncredited)
- Phone Call from a Stranger (1952) - Dr. Luther Fletcher (uncredited)
- Just This Once (1952) - Prouty, Creditor (uncredited)
- Flesh and Fury (1952) - Dr. Gundling (uncredited)
- Carbine Williams (1952) - Judge Kerr (uncredited)
- The Sniper (1952) - Mayor (uncredited)
- Paula (1952) - Gentleman in Park (uncredited)
- Washington Story (1952) - Minor Role (uncredited)
- Ma and Pa Kettle at the Fair (1952) - Pastor (uncredited)
- Woman of the North Country (1952) - Bystander (uncredited)
- Dreamboat (1952) - Macintosh (uncredited)
- Ride the Man Down (1952) - Rancher (uncredited)
- Cry of the Hunted (1953) - Doctor (uncredited)
- Latin Lovers (1953) - Tom Marston, Board Member (uncredited)
- Devil's Canyon (1953) - Happy, the Bartender (uncredited)
- Jack Slade (1953) - Mr. Hill (uncredited)
- Escape from Fort Bravo (1953) - Chaplain (uncredited)
- Pride of the Blue Grass (1954) - Hunter
- Dangerous Mission (1954) - Mr. Elster
- Fireman Save My Child (1954) - Commissioner Spencer
- Phffft (1954) - Nina's Divorce Lawyer (uncredited)
- The Seven Little Foys (1955) - Stage Doorman at 'Iroquois' (uncredited)
- The First Traveling Saleslady (1956) - Judge Benson
- The Boss (1956) - Governor Beck (uncredited)
- The Restless Breed (1957) - Mayor Johnson
- Loving You (1957) - Mayor (uncredited)
- My Man Godfrey (1957) - James Elliott
- I Married a Woman (1958) - Texan at Phone Booth (uncredited)
- The Big Country (1958) - Party Guest (uncredited)
- Colgate Theatre (1958) (Season 1 Episode 8: "If You Knew Tomorrow")
- Don't Give Up the Ship (1959) - Judge Whipple, Wedding Guest with Cake in Hat (uncredited)
- Alfred Hitchcock Presents (1960) (Season 6 Episode 1: "Mrs. Bixby and the Colonel's Coat") - Mr. Gorman (uncredited)
- Heller in Pink Tights (1960) - Poker Player (uncredited)
- From the Terrace (1960) - Partner (uncredited)
- Let's Make Love (1960) - Amanda's Father (uncredited)
- The Errand Boy (1961) - Ulysses Paramutual (uncredited)
- The Patsy (1964) - Police Sergeant (uncredited) (final film role)
