= Rodeo (1952 film) =

1952 American sports drama film directed by William Beaudine

- Directed by: William Beaudine
- Written by: Charles R. Marion
- Produced by: Walter Mirisch
- Starring: Jane Nigh; John Archer; Wallace Ford; Gary Gray
- Cinematography: Harry Neumann
- Edited by: William Austin
- Music by: Marlin Skiles
- Production company: Monogram Pictures
- Distributed by: Monogram Pictures
- Release date: March 9, 1952
- Running time: 70 minutes
- Country: United States
- Language: English

Rodeo is a 1952 American sports drama film directed by William Beaudine and starring Jane Nigh, John Archer and Wallace Ford. The film was made in cinecolor.

== Plot ==
When the rodeo association owes her father a feed bill of $1,800, Nancy Cartwright goes to collect. To her shock, she discovers that not only has the association no funds, rodeo rider Slim Martin and others want Nancy to run the association.

She agrees to take over, and a romantic attachment develops between Nancy and Slim. A misunderstanding results in a past-his-prime performer, Barbecue Jones, attempting a comeback and being seriously injured. But things work out well in the end, Nancy restoring the association's finances and paying Barbecue's medical bills.

== Cast ==
- Jane Nigh as Nancy Cartwright
- John Archer as Slim Martin
- Wallace Ford as Barbecue Jones
- Gary Gray as Joey Cartwright
- Frances Rafferty as Dixie Benson
- Sara Haden as Agatha Cartwright
- Frank Ferguson as Harry Cartwright
- Myron Healey as Richard Durston
- Fuzzy Knight as Jazbo Davis
- Robert Karnes as Charles Olenick
- Jim Bannon as Bat Gorman
- I. Stanford Jolley as Pete Adkins
- Ann Doran as Mrs. Martha Durston
- Russell Hicks as Allen H. Grandstead

== Bibliography ==
- Marshall, Wendy L. William Beaudine: From Silents to Television. Scarecrow Press, 2005.
