= Fort Osage (film) =

1952 film

- Original film poster
- Directed by: Lesley Selander
- Written by: Daniel B. Ullman
- Produced by: Walter Mirisch
- Starring: Rod Cameron; Jane Nigh; Morris Ankrum
- Cinematography: Harry Neumann
- Edited by: Richard V. Heermance
- Music by: Marlin Skiles
- Production company: Monogram Pictures
- Distributed by: Monogram Pictures
- Release date: February 10, 1952
- Running time: 72 minutes
- Country: United States
- Language: English

Fort Osage is a 1952 American Cinecolor Western film directed by Lesley Selander and starring Rod Cameron, Jane Nigh and Morris Ankrum. The film takes its name from the historical Fort Osage.

The film's sets were designed by the art director Dave Milton.

== Plot ==
Arthur Pickett and George Keane, based at Fort Osage, are profiting by charging exorbitant fees for wagons waiting to travel westward to California. The final wagon train of the year is awaiting its experienced wagon master Tom Clay, who witnesses an Osage Indian attack on a lone wagon and warns Pickett and Keane that no wagons can leave as long as the Indians are on the warpath.

== Cast ==
- Rod Cameron as Tom Clay
- Jane Nigh as Ann Pickett
- Morris Ankrum as Arthur Pickett
- Douglas Kennedy as George Keane
- John Ridgely as Henry Travers
- William Phipps as Nathan Goodspeed
- Myron Healey as Martin Christensen
- I. Stanford Jolley as Sam Winfield
- Lane Bradford as Henchman Rawlins
- Dorothy Adams as Mrs. Winfield
- Iron Eyes Cody as Osage Brave
- Francis McDonald as Osage Chief
- Barbara Woodell as Martha Whitley

== Bibliography ==
- Alan Gevinson. Within Our Gates: Ethnicity in American Feature Films, 1911-1960. University of California Press, 1997.
