= Blue Blood (1951 film) =

1951 film by Lew Landers

- Theatrical release poster
- Directed by: Lew Landers
- Screenplay by: Scott Darling
- Based on: Dog Meat by Peter B. Kyne
- Produced by: Ben Schwalb
- Starring: Bill Williams; Jane Nigh; Arthur Shields; Audrey Long; Harry Shannon; Lyle Talbot
- Cinematography: Gilbert Warrenton
- Edited by: Roy Livingston
- Music by: Ozzie Caswell
- Production company: Monogram Pictures
- Distributed by: Monogram Pictures
- Release date: January 28, 1951
- Running time: 72 minutes
- Country: United States
- Language: English

Blue Blood is a 1951 American drama film directed by Lew Landers, written by Scott Darling and starring Bill Williams, Jane Nigh, Arthur Shields and Audrey Long. The film was released on January 28, 1951 by Monogram Pictures.

== Cast ==
- Bill Williams as Bill Manning
- Jane Nigh as Eileen Buchanan
- Arthur Shields as Tim Donovan
- Audrey Long as Sue Buchanan
- Harry Shannon as Mr. Buchanan
- Lyle Talbot as Teasdale
- William Tannen as Sparks
- Harry Cheshire as McArthur
- Milton Kibbee as Ryan
