= Emergency Landing (1941 film) =

1941 film by William Beaudine

- Original film poster
- Directed by: William Beaudine
- Written by: Martin Mooney (story & screenplay)
- Produced by: Jed Buell
- Starring: Forrest Tucker; Carol Hughes; Evelyn Brent
- Cinematography: Jack Greenhalgh
- Edited by: Robert O. Crandall
- Music by: Lew Porter
- Production company: Producers Releasing Corporation
- Distributed by: Producers Releasing Corporation
- Release date: May 9, 1941
- Running time: 64 minutes
- Country: United States
- Language: English

Emergency Landing (a.k.a. Robot Pilot) is a 1941 American aviation spy-fi romantic screwball comedy film directed by William Beaudine. The film stars Forrest Tucker in his second film and in his first leading role with co-stars Carol Hughes and Evelyn Brent. Emergency Landing features much-mismatched stock footage of various types of aircraft.

== Plot ==
Arizona inventor "Doc" Williams (Emmett Vogan) has invented a wireless remote control that can pilot an aircraft. (Note: In the 1940s, to the general public, such a wireless remote control device was considered more of science fiction than science.) Despite his efforts and those of his friend, pilot Jerry Barton (Forrest Tucker), they can not interest anyone in the invention. Barton has found a job as a test pilot for a millionaire named George Lambert (William Halligan) with his own aircraft company. When Doc brings a model of his invention, the two send their model aircraft to buzz Lambert on the golf course. Lambert is fascinated and arranges a test, but his daughter Betty is not, especially when the model lands in a puddle and drenches her.

When the time comes for a test of the device installed in a real aircraft, Jerry takes the aircraft up and switches to a remote control. United States Army Air Forces observers are skeptical that Jerry is flying the aircraft himself so Jerry parachutes out of the aircraft. The device, however, is not perfected and the aircraft crashes. The event is observed by foreign agents working undercover at Lambert Aircraft. Doc and Jerry return in failure to Arizona to perfect the device.

At the same time Betty announces she wishes to go to Hollywood, with her Aunt Maude. When their vehicle runs out of gas near Indian Springs, Arizona, the girls decide to steal fuel from an airport beacon but are caught by Jerry who tows their car to Doc's house. As Jerry is a local Federal Aviation Administration official, he has the authority to arrest the girls until Judge Gildersleeve comes. The girls hear tales of his imaginary severe sentences. Jerry telegraphs George Lambert about what they have done and asks his permission to teach the haughty Betty a lesson. The girls have to do housework but Maude later overhears the boys' scheme and wins them over by saying it is a great idea as Betty, spoiled since childhood, needs a comeuppance.

Meanwhile, the two enemy agents hijack a new Lambert-designed bomber being tested at Lambert Field. When the bomber crashes nearby with one agent (I. Stanford Jolley) surviving, he makes his way to Doc and Jerry's house, pretending he has been in an automobile accident. When Doc and Jerry learn the truth, the agent hijacks Doc's aircraft with the two girls as hostages. Doc's aircraft, however, has the remote control device installed that now works and Doc and Jerry are able to land the aircraft and capture the agent. The real Judge Gildersleeve (Billy Curtis), a midget, appears and fines the girls. (Note: Maude breaks the fourth wall by asking the audience if they believed what they saw.)

== Cast ==
- Forrest Tucker as Jerry Barton
- Carol Hughes as Betty Lambert
- Evelyn Brent as Maude Marshall
- Emmett Vogan as "Doc" Williams
- William Halligan as George B. Lambert
- George Sherwood as Jones
- Joaquin Edwards as Pedro
- I. Stanford Jolley as Karl
- Stanley Price as Otto
- Jack Lescoulie as Captain North
- Paul Scott as Colonel Lemon
- Billy Curtis as Judge Gildersleeve

== Production ==
A Lockheed Model 14 Super Electra stood in for the "Lambert Bomber X291" in Emergency Landing.

Principal photography for Emergency Landing took place from late March to early April 1941. After a stint in Great Britain, director William "One Shot" Beaudine returned to America in 1937 but had trouble re-establishing himself at the major studios. After working at Warner Brothers, Beaudine found work on Poverty Row, working for studios specializing in low-budget films, such as Monogram Pictures and Producers Releasing Corporation. Beaudine became a specialist in comedies, thrillers and melodramas making dozens for these studios. By the 1940s, Beaudine had a reputation for being a resourceful, no-nonsense director who could make feature films in a matter of days, sometimes as few as five.

== Reception ==
Shortly after release, Emergency Landing was re-titled Robot Pilot. Merely a B film, Variety felt the film's major asset was "sex appeal".
