= County Fair (1950 film) =

1950 film by William Beaudine

- Directed by: William Beaudine
- Written by: Scott Darling
- Produced by: Walter Mirisch
- Starring: Rory Calhoun; Jane Nigh; Florence Bates; Warren Douglas
- Cinematography: Gilbert Warrenton
- Edited by: Richard V. Heermance
- Music by: Ozzie Caswell
- Production company: Monogram Pictures
- Distributed by: Monogram Pictures
- Release date: July 29, 1950
- Running time: 76 minutes
- Country: United States
- Language: English

County Fair is a 1950 American drama film directed by William Beaudine and starring Rory Calhoun, Jane Nigh and Florence Bates. It is a remake of the 1932 film The County Fair, which had also been remade in 1937.

== Plot ==
A team of locals thwart the plans of a group of criminals to fix a race by doping a horse.

== Cast ==
- Rory Calhoun as Peter Brennan
- Jane Nigh as Loretta Ryan
- Florence Bates as Nora 'Ma' Ryan
- Warren Douglas as Tommy Blake
- Raymond Hatton as Sad Sam
- Emory Parnell as Tim Brennan
- Rory Mallinson as Grattan
- Harry Cheshire as Auctioneer
- Milton Kibbee as Racing Secretary
- Roy E. Shudt as Race Commentary

== Production ==
Rory Calhoun and Jane Nigh were named as the stars on April 13, 1950 and filming commenced the following day. Location filming took place at the Los Angeles County Fairgrounds in Pomona, California.

== See also ==
- List of films about horses
- List of films about horse racing

== Bibliography ==
- Langman, Larry & Ebner, David. Hollywood's Image of the South: A Century of Southern Films. Greenwood Publishing, 2001.
- Marshall, Wendy L. William Beaudine: From Silents to Television. Scarecrow Press, 2005.
