= Buffalo Bill, Jr. =

American Western television show

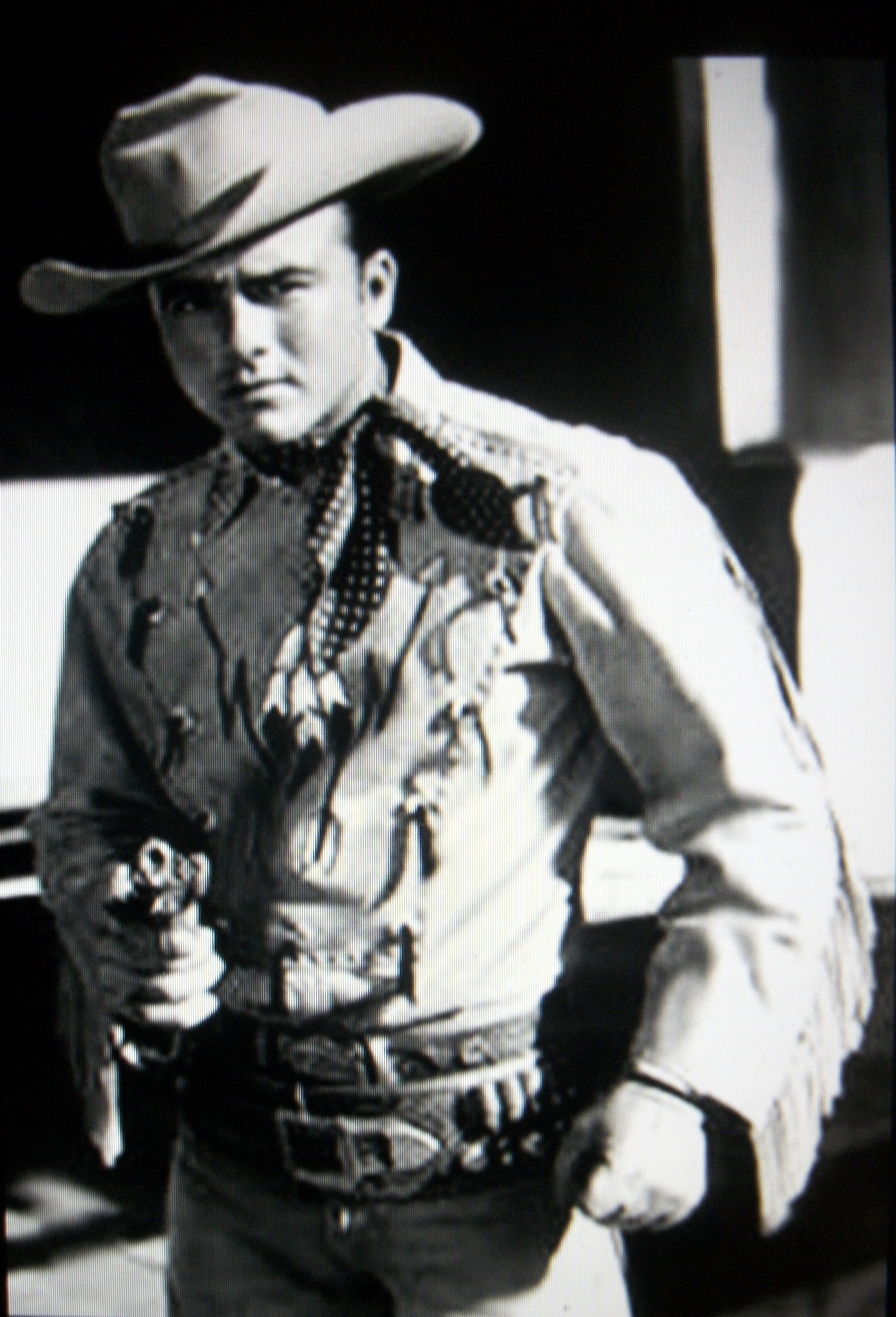
- Publicity shot of Buffalo Bill, Jr.
- Genre: Western
- Starring: Dick Jones; Nancy Gilbert; Harry Cheshire
- Country of origin: United States
- Original language: English
- No. of seasons: 2
- No. of episodes: 42

Production
- Executive producer: Gene Autry
- Running time: 25-minute episodes
- Production company: Flying A Productions

Original release
- Network: Syndication
- Release: 1955 – 1956 (last new episode)

Buffalo Bill, Jr. is a half-hour Western television series that aired in syndication starting in March 1955. The last new episode was broadcast in September 1956. The series was produced by Gene Autry's Flying A Productions, and distributed by CBS Television Film Sales. The 42 episodes continued to be leased and broadcast via individual stations until at least 1961. In 1964, the ABC network began airing the series on Saturday mornings at 9:30 am.

== Production ==
Gene Autry came up with the idea of doing a children's Western about an old judge, a teenaged cowboy, and his little sister. Dick Jones was under contract to Autry's Flying A Productions, and was asked to play the young cowboy, though he was 28 years old in 1955. Since childhood, Jones had worked at rodeos as a trick rider and roper, so he did his own stunts on the show.

The series was filmed at Pioneertown, and the original sponsors were Brown Shoe Company and Mars Candy. The Western was sold to more than 100 markets. Louis Gray was the producer, George Archinbaud was the director, and Paul Franklin was the writer.

== Cast ==
- Dick Jones as Buffalo Bill, Jr.
- Nancy Gilbert as Calamity
- Harry Cheshire as Judge Ben "Fair and Square" Wiley

Guest stars include James Best as the town's telegraph operator for one episode. Some of the veteran actors who had guest roles are Denver Pyle, Glenn Strange, and William Fawcett. One of Lee Van Cleef's early roles had him brawling with Bill, Jr. in the episode "Boomer's Blunder".

== Synopsis ==
After an Indian attack on a wagon train, Judge Wiley finds two survivors, a boy and a girl, traveling through the Black Hills. The boy is carrying his younger sister, whom he had wrapped in a buffalo robe, so the judge called him Buffalo Bill, Jr. The judge considered the girl to be mischievous, so he called her Calamity. Wiley adopts the children and raises them in Wileyville, a town that he founded. Besides being the town's judge, Wiley also runs the general store, which has a courtroom inside of it. In addition, he is the town doctor, the sheriff, the barber, and the blacksmith.

Despite Wileyville being a remote, small town Buffalo Bill, Jr. and his family have encounters with Geronimo, Billy the Kid, Johnny Ringo, Wyatt Earp, and members of Jesse James' outlaw gang. A TV Guide reviewer wrote that it is nothing for Buffalo Bill, Jr. "to leap from his galloping mount atop an outlaw riding at top speed, knock him to the ground, and best him in a slugfest."

== Episodes ==
=== Season 1 (1955-1956) ===
No. overall	No. in season	Title	Directed by	Written by	Original release date
1	1	"The Fight for Geronimo"	George Archainbaud	John K. Butler	TBA
Buffalo Bill, Jr. and Calamity learn of a plot to free Geronimo from the soldiers who are transporting him to a Florida reservation.
2	2	"Runaway Renegade"	Ray Nazarro	Robert Schaefer and Eric Freiwald	TBA
A young boy robs the judge's store. Bill captures the boy and brings him in. While the judge is questioning him, a deputy sheriff shows up, claiming the boy's father murdered the sheriff.
3	3	"Empire Pass"	George Archainbaud	Paul Franklin	TBA
Wileyville's railroad is about to go out of business due to an aggressive, competing railroad, but Bill convinces the townsfolk to lay tracks across Empire Pass.
4	4	"Trail of the Killer"	George Archainbaud	Paul Franklin	TBA
Buffalo Bill, Jr. captures Billy the Kid. One of the Kid's outlaw gang impersonates a sheriff, and claims the captured man is his deputy.
5	5	"The Black Ghost"	George Archainbaud	Paul Gangelin	TBA
Calamity is suspicious of the rancher's niece with whom her brother is infatuated. Can Calamity prove the lady is trying to steal her uncle's property?
6	6	"The Death of Johnny Ringo"	Ray Nazarro	Dwight Cummins	TBA
Outlaw Johnny Ringo steals funds meant for the Paiutes. He goes to Wileyville, and takes Calamity and the judge hostage. James Best plays the telegraph operator.
7	7	"Boomer's Blunder"	George Archainbaud	Paul Franklin	TBA
Tungsten ore is discovered on Judge Wiley and his neighbor's properties. Bill and Calamity try to keep them from being cheated out of their land. Lee Van Cleef is a guest star.
8	8	"The Rain Wagon"	Ray Nazarro	Samuel Newman	TBA
During a drought, a rainmaker comes to Wileyville. While townsfolk watch the man at his work, the express office is robbed. Evidence points to a struggling farmer as the thief, but Bill is sure the man is innocent.
9	9	"Tough Tenderfoot"	George Archainbaud	Paul Gangelin	TBA
Bill and Calamity help a Scotsman who is trying to take possession of his late uncle's gold mine. The mine is supposed to be played out, but someone is willing to kill to own it.
10	10	"First Posse"	Ray Nazarro	Samuel Newman	TBA
Wyatt Earp and Doc Holliday need a posse to catch an outlaw. Bill is considered too young to be included, so he sneaks off to join them. When Calamity follows him, he must take her home – where the outlaw is holding the judge prisoner.
11	11	"Hooded Vengeance"	George Archainbaud	Maurice Geraghty	TBA
Members of the Ku Klux Klan wreak havoc on local ranches. When the ranchers are too afraid to help capture the klansmen, Bill and Calamity do it themselves. Denver Pyle guest stars as one of the villains.
12	12	"A Bronc Called Gunboat"	Ray Nazarro	John K. Butler	TBA
A rodeo owner wants to kill a horse named Gunboat when a top bronc rider breaks his leg trying to stay on the animal. When Bill's horse is stolen, he is determined to ride Gunboat to catch up with the outlaws.
13	13	"The Calico Kid"	George Archainbaud	Maurice Geraghty	TBA
A poor miner's daughter comes to town, but her father exaggerated his success in letters to her. Bill tries to keep the daughter from learning the truth, even going as far as pretending to be the outlaw Calico Kid. Lee Van Cleef guest stars as Stace.
14	14	"Pawnee Stampede"	George Archainbaud	Robert Schaefer and Eric Freiwald	TBA
The Pawnee Strip is to be opened up to settlers, but the area had become a haven for lawbreakers who are willing to kill to keep homesteaders out of the area.
15	15	"The Six-Gun Symphony"	Ray Nazarro	TBA	TBA
A boy tries to hide his father, who is wanted by the law.
16	16	"Grave of the Monsters"	Ray Nazzaro	Orville H. Hampton	TBA
An archeologist and his men survey a portion of the Navajo reservation, and they kill the Indian agent, while trying to gain possession of sacred land.
17	17	"Lucky Horseshoe"	George Archainbaud	Paul Gangelin	TBA
A competing store owner is charging lower prices than Judge Wiley can. Half of the supplies meant for the Indian reservation are lost in transit. Are the two events connected? William Fawcett guest stars as the teamster, Poke.
18	18	"Red Hawk"	Ray Nazarro	Robert Schaefer and Eric Freiwald	TBA
Johnny Red Hawk, the adopted Indian son of the freight line owner, returns from college to help his father run his business, but he faces bigotry.
19	19	"Redskin Gap"	George Archainbaud	Orville H. Hampton	TBA
Bill and Calamity must prevent Butch Cassidy from crossing the border into Mexico.
20	20	"Legacy of Jesse James"	Frank McDonald	Samuel Newman	TBA
Survivors of Jesse James' outlaw gang try to recover hidden money. William Fawcett is a guest star.
21	21	"The Devil's Washbowl"	George Archainbaud	Joe Richardson	TBA
A newcomer declares that a health resort hotel will be built beside the local hot springs. When the money for construction is stolen, Wileyville residents invest in the hotel project, but Bill and Calamity suspect the hotel developers may be crooks.
22	22	"The Fight for Texas"	George Archainbaud	John K. Butler	TBA
The Texas Rangers want to cross the Mexican border to capture outlaws. Cattle rustlers force Calamity, who knows Morse code, to send a false message granting permission, so the Rangers will be disbanded for breaking international law. William Fawcett plays the Rangers' cook.
23	23	"Apache Raid"	Ray Nazarro	Maurice Geraghty	TBA
A rancher moves his cattle onto the Apache Indian reservation, and then accuses the Apaches of cattle rustling. Bill and Calamity prove the Apaches' innocence. Glenn Strange guest stars as Keetahano.
24	24	"Rails Westward"	Ray Nazarro	Jack Townlet	TBA
The railroad is coming to Wileyville, which will take business from the stage line. Bill recommends that a newcomer purchase the stage line, not knowing it will soon be nearly worthless.
25	25	"The Little Mavericks"	Frank McDonald	TBA	TBA
Bill and Calamity set out to capture two outlaws.
26	26	"Fugitive from Injustice"	George Archainbaud	Paul Gangelin	TBA
Bill and Calamity find a young boy named Papito Gonzales living at an abandoned home. The boy has a mare and colt that he has hiding from a man who claims Papito stole the horses.

=== Season 2 (1956) ===
No. overall	No. in season	Title	Directed by	Written by	Original release date
27	1	"Ambush at Lizard Rock"	George Archainbaud	TBA	TBA
A gambler causes trouble.
28	2	"The Assassins"	TBA	TBA	TBA
A young deputy must prove that he is worthy to be a lawman.
29	3	"The Jayhawker"	Frank McDonald	TBA	TBA
Bill tries to capture the Jayhawker, an elusive outlaw.
30	4	"Trouble Thompson"	TBA	TBA	TBA
Bill and Calamity help an elderly circus clown who believes he will always be unlucky.
31	5	"The Golden Plant"	TBA	TBA	TBA
Two outlaws try to outwit an old man.
32	6	"Kid Curry - Killer"	Frank McDonald	TBA	TBA
Bill tries to capture a killer.
33	7	"Secret of the Silverado"	George Archainbaud	Oliver Drake	TBA
Bill and Calamity help a Mexican friend stop a silver smuggling ring.
34	8	"Angelo Goes West"	George Archainbaud	TBA	TBA
Angelo, an Italian organ grinder, buys an abandoned ranch, and wants to become a U.S. citizen. Outlaws use the ranch as a hideout and threaten Angelo, saying he will never become a citizen if he tells anyone where they are staying.
35	9	"Kansas City Lady"	Frank McDonald	Oliver Drake	TBA
Bill and Calamity try to help a young boy who resents the arrival of his new stepmother.
36	10	"A Diamond for Grandpa"	TBA	TBA	TBA
Bill helps a man retain custody of his orphaned grandson.
37	11	"The Lady and the Judge"	George Archainbaud	TBA	TBA
Bill sets out to capture a gang of robbers.
38	12	"Double-Cross Money"	TBA	TBA	TBA
Bill tries to stop crooked bankers from stealing money from the Blue River Bank in nearby Granite City.
39	13	"Silver Mine Mystery"	D. Ross Lederman	TBA	TBA
A man is stealing ore from silver mine owners.
40	14	"Blazing Guns"	D. Ross Lederman	Elizabeth Beecher	TBA
Calamity makes visits to a tailor, and helps Bill discover how robbers are learning when money is being shipped.
41	15	"Gun-Talk September"	TBA	TBA	TBA
Bill has a run-in with a horse thief.
42	16	"Rough-Shod"	George Archainbaud	J. Benton Chaney	TBA
A businessman is obtaining money illegally.

== Critical response ==
A review in the trade publication Variety said that the program had "just enough guns, blundering, and fisticuffs to satisfy most juve video viewers". It compared the show to Flying A's Annie Oakley, saying "Only difference was in the sex of the leads."

A review in the trade publication Billboard said that the show had "All the standard ingredients that make for good, commercial kiddie Westerns". The review noted an emphasis on outdoor action and a "fast-moving script" that was produced well.

== Series-related merchandise ==
=== Promotional items ===
Sponsors helped promote the show by advertising series tie-ins. In 1955, children were given a free Buffalo Bill, Jr. ring with the purchase of a pair of shoes. Also in 1955, an advertisement in LIFE offered a "leatherlike" Buffalo Bill, Jr. belt, with a "silvery" buckle for 25 cents and three Milky Way candy wrappers.

=== Media ===
Dell Comics published a series of Buffalo Bill, Jr. comic books between 1955 and 1959. Western Publishing produced at least two Buffalo Bill, Jr. children's novels: The Brand Changers and The Buffalo Hunter, both from 1958. View-Master produced a three-reel Buffalo Bill, Jr. set.
