= Operation Haylift =

1950 film

- Original theatrical film poster
- Directed by: William Berke
- Written by: Dean Riesner; Joe Sawyer
- Produced by: Joe Sawyer
- Starring: Bill Williams; Ann Rutherford; Tom Brown
- Cinematography: Benjamin Kline
- Edited by: Carl Pierson
- Music by: Russell Garcia; Richard Hazard
- Production companies: Lippert Productions, Inc.
- Distributed by: Lippert Pictures
- Release dates: April 10, 1950 (Ely, Nevada); May 5, 1950 (U.S.)
- Running time: 83 minutes
- Country: United States
- Language: English

Operation Haylift is a 1950 American aviation film directed by William Berke and starring Bill Williams, Ann Rutherford and Tom Brown. The film is a fictionalized account of a true story that documents the United States Air Force mission in 1948–49 to save thousands of cattle caught in the snowdrifts of a sudden winter storm in northern Nevada. The mission, titled "Operation Haylift", involved scores of cargo aircraft delivering hay to the stranded animals.

== Plot ==
With their 10-year-old son Roy, Bill and Clara Masters live on a ranch near Ely, Nevada. Bill's brother Tom, recently returned from serving as an Air Force pilot, is home to work on the ranch. When Bill and Tom capture rustlers, they earn a $5,000 reward from George Swallow of the Stockman's Association. Bill wants to use the money to buy more ranch land, but he senses that Tom is not committed to working at the ranch. When Bill sends for Tom's girlfriend Pat Rogers, they marry and leave for their honeymoon in Lake Tahoe.

On the way, the married couple meet Tom's friend Max Maxwell and his wife. Max has rejoined the Air Force and is about to leave for Germany to participate in the Berlin Airlift. Tom also rejoins and leaves with Pat for Germany. When his tour finishes in 1948, Tom returns home, where the nation is experiencing a drought followed by a massive series of 18 blizzards in 27 days, which cripples Nevada.

A state of emergency is declared, and Army and National Guard units from Nevada and neighboring states are summoned. In the winter, many sheep and cattle experience freezing temperatures and die of starvation. George Swallow calls ranchers, proposing to seek the Air Force's help in dropping hay to the stranded animals, but Bill is skeptical that the scheme will work. A fleet of 18 Fairchild C-82 Packets arrive at Fallon Airport, with Tom scheduled to fly the first mission.

The first flight is a great success and, while president Harry S. Truman requests emergency funds for the ranchers, the 62nd Troop Carrier Group continues its haylift operation. When Bill becomes stuck in a snowdrift, he must ride on horseback into Ely for help. Tom flies a mission to drop hay to Bill's animals and eventually, with the successful conclusion of Operation Haylift, thousands of tons of hay dropped over an area of 85,000 square miles (220,000 km^{2}) saves one million cattle and two million sheep.

== Cast ==
- Bill Williams as Bill Masters
- Ann Rutherford as Clara Masters
- Tom Brown as Tom Masters
- Jane Nigh as Pat Rogers
- Joe Sawyer as George Swallow
- Richard Travis as Max Maxwell
- Raymond Hatton as Sandy Cameron
- James Conlin as Ed North
- Tommy Ivo as Roy Masters
- M'liss McClure as Mary

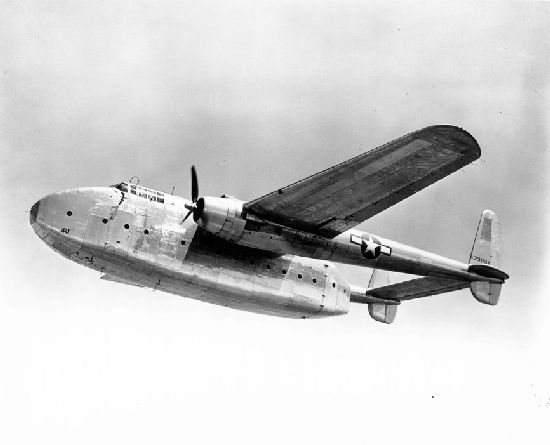
The USAF lent 18 Fairchild C-82 transports to Operation Haylift. (Note: The C-82 was sometimes called the Flying Boxcar, a name that was more often linked to the Fairchild C-119 series.)

== Production ==
The opening credits include the following written prologue: "This production was photographed entirely in Ely, Nevada, and was made possible through the cooperation of the Department of Defense, U.S. Air Force and the Department of Agriculture." In the months prior to production, producer Joe Sawyer and cameraman Benjamin Kline made six trips to Ely to arrange filming locations.

Filming began on January 11, 1950 and was expected to last at least eight days.

Production of Operation Haylift took place in Ely, the center of the actual operation. Primary filming locations included Ely's main street, the office of United Stockmen, various ranches and Ely Airport. Ely's Hotel Nevada and Gambling Hall was used as a filming location and also served as headquarters for the cast and crew. For filming, the Air Force provided C-82s from Wright-Patterson Air Force Base in Ohio. More than 200 local residents appeared in the film, primarily in crowd scenes.

== Release ==
The film's premiere was held in Ely, Nevada on April 10, 1950. George N. Swallow, who was involved in the actual operation and served as a technical advisor for the film, (Note: As listed in the film's opening credits.) was also largely responsible for arranging for the film to shoot in Ely and also its premiere there.

== Reception ==
Aviation film historian Stephen Pendo said Operation Haylift was a modest B movie whose "most interesting moments come during sequences of the Flying Boxcars, lent by the Air Force for the film." Two other aviation film historians, Jack Hardwick and Ed Schnepf, dismissed Operation Haylift as "good if you like to watch C-82s dropping hay."
