= Bill Williams (actor) =

American actor (1915–1992)

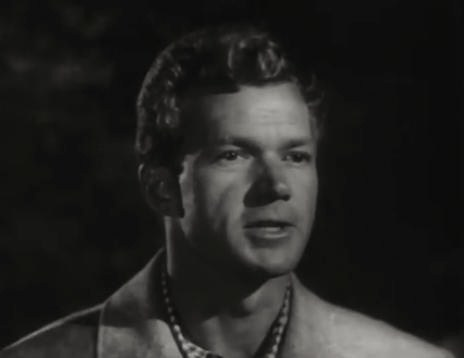
- Williams in The Pace That Thrills (1952)
- Born: Herman August Wilhelm Katt; May 15, 1915; Brooklyn, New York, U.S.
- Died: September 21, 1992 (aged 77); Burbank, California, U.S.
- Resting place: Forest Lawn Memorial Park, Hollywood Hills, California, U.S.
- Other name: Bill MacWilliams
- Occupation: Actor
- Years active: 1933–1981
- Spouse: Barbara Hale (m. 1946)
- Children: 3, including William

Herman August Wilhelm Katt (May 15, 1915 – September 21, 1992), known professionally as Bill Williams, was an American actor, best known for his portrayal of the titular character in the western series The Adventures of Kit Carson, which aired in syndication from 1951 to 1955.

== Life and career ==
Herman August Wilhelm Katt was born on May 15, 1915 in Brooklyn, New York to German immigrant parents. He attended the Pratt Institute and became a professional swimmer, performing in underwater shows. He landed a walk-on role as a theater usher in King Kong (1933). He enlisted in the United States Army during World War II, but was discharged before the end and became an actor. His credited debut was in Murder in the Blue Room in 1944, using the professional name Bill Williams. His first starring role was opposite Susan Hayward in Deadline at Dawn (1946).

Williams appeared in ten films before he landed the lead role in television's The Adventures of Kit Carson, which ran for 105 episodes. When the series ended, Williams' star power faded. It was revived in 1957 when he co-starred with Betty White on television in Date with the Angels. Williams portrayed Federal agent Martin Flaherty in The Scarface Mob (1959), the pilot for ABC's The Untouchables. However, when the series was accepted, the role went to Jerry Paris. Williams turned down the lead in Sea Hunt in 1958, believing that an underwater show would not work on television. Lloyd Bridges accepted the part and turned it into a hit. Williams did star as a former Navy frogman in Assignment: Underwater, which ran for just one season. He played a variety of roles on Perry Mason, in which his wife Barbara Hale co-starred as Raymond Burr's secretary Della Street. In a 1962 episode, "The Case of the Crippled Cougar," he played defendant Mike Preston. In 1963, he was murder victim Floyd Grant in "The Case of the Bluffing Blast." In 1965 Williams played murderer Charles Shaw in "The Case of the Murderous Mermaid," and was the apparent victim/murderer Burt Payne in "The Case of the 12th Wildcat". Williams appeared with his son, William Katt, in a final season episode of Ironside, bringing him together again with Raymond Burr. He also made numerous guest appearances on television and worked in low-budget science fiction films until his retirement.

=== Personal life and death ===
Williams married the actress Barbara Hale on June 22, 1946. They met during the filming of West of the Pecos and had two daughters, Jodi and Juanita, and a son, the actor William Katt.

Bill Williams died of a brain tumor at age 77 in 1992 and is buried at Forest Lawn Memorial Park (Hollywood Hills).

For his contributions to television, Bill Williams has a star on the Hollywood Walk of Fame. It is at 6145 Hollywood Boulevard.

== Acting roles ==
=== Star of his own television series ===
- The Adventures of Kit Carson TV series (1951–1955) as Kit Carson, 105 episodes
- Date with the Angels (1957–1958) as Gus Angel, 33 episodes
- Assignment: Underwater (1960–1961) as Bill Greer, 39 episodes

=== Multiple appearances on a television series ===
- Schlitz Playhouse of Stars

Well of Anger (1955)
Angels in the Sky (1956)

- Science Fiction Theatre

The Hastings Secret (1955) as Bill Twining
Project 44 (1956) as Dr. Arnold Bryan
The Mind Machine (1956) as Dr. Alan Cathcart
Jupitron (1956) as Dr. John Barlow
Killer Tree (1957) as Paul Cameron

- Walt Disney's Wonderful World of Color

Texas John Slaughter:

The Man From Bitter Creek (1959) as Paul
The Slaughter Trail (1959) as Paul

Gallagher Goes West

Tragedy on the Trail (1967) as Joe Carlson
Trial by Terror (1967) as Joe Carlson

Chester, Yesterday's Horse (1973) as Ben Kincaid
The Flight of the Grey Wolf, Parts 1 and 2 (1976) as The Sheriff

- The Millionaire

The Kathy Munson Story (1956) as Donald Abbott
Millionaire Martha Halloran (1959) as Clint Halloran

- Westinghouse Desilu Playhouse

The Untouchables, Parts 1 and 2 (1959) as Martin Flaherty

- Perry Mason

The Case of the Crippled Cougar (1962) as Mike Preston
The Case of the Bluffing Blast (1963) as Floyd Grant
The Case of the Murderous Mermaid (1965) as Charles Shaw
The Case of the 12th Wildcat (1965) as Burt Payne

- Batman

Fine Finny Fiends (1966) as Multimillionaire
Multimillionaire-Batman Makes the Scenes (1966) as Multimillionaire

- Lassie

Climb the Mountain Slowly (1964) as Vince
Lassie and the Buffalo (1966) as Jed Bingham

- The F.B.I.

The Runaways (1968) as David Warren
The Lost Man (1974) as Crawford

- Ironside

Nightmare Trip (1972) as Lt. Dacker
The Rolling Y (1975) as Sheriff Callahan

- Adam-12

Pick-Up (1971) as William Taylor (his wife, Barbara Hale, also appeared in the episode)
Routine Patrol: The Drugstore Cowboys (1974) as Fred Wheeler

- The Rookies

Three Hours to Kill (1973) as Captain Fin Whitfield
Get Ryker (1973) as Captain Fin Whitfield
Something Less Than a Man (1974) as Captain Johnson

- Police Woman (1974)

The End Game (1974) as Lt. Graumann
Sarah Who? (1976) as Captain
"Guns" (1977) Captain Williams
"Blind Terror" (1978) as Captain Miller

=== Miscellaneous television appearances ===
- Adventures in Jazz (1949) as Host
- The Bigelow Theatre, Make Your Bed (1951)
- Dragnet, The Big Pug (1954)
- The Red Skelton Show, Deadeye vs. The Lone Ranger (1955) as Kit Carson
- Studio 57, Young Couples Only (1955) as Rick Thompson
- Damon Runyon Theater, Miracle Jones (1956) as Andy Gubbins
- M Squad, Girl Lost (1958) as Jerry Langdon
- Yancy Derringer, Ticket to Natchez (1958) as Duke Winslow
- General Electric Theater, The Flying Wife (1959) as Stewart Davidson
- Bachelor Father, East Meets West (1959) as Rock Randall
- Men into Space, Asteroid (1959) as Dr. Stacy Croydon
- Laramie, Man of God (1959) as Charlie Root
- The Investigators, New Sound For the Blues (1961)
- Hawaiian Eye, Location Shooting (1962) as Norman Ayres
- Lawman, Get Out of Town (1962)
- Target: The Corruptors!, Goodbye Children (1962) as Walter Parker
- 77 Sunset Strip, The Snow Job Caper (1962) as Steve Moran
- Law of the Lawless (1964) as Silas Miller
- Rawhide, The Lost Herd (1964)
- The Wild Wild West, Night of the Casual Killer (1965) as Marshal Kirby
- Dragnet 1967, The Big Frustration (1967) as Sgt. Bill Riddle
- Daniel Boone, The Spanish Horse (1967)
- Insight, A Thousand Red Flowers (1969) as Pop
- Marcus Welby, M.D., To Carry the Sun in a Golden Cup (1970) as Lynch
- O'Hara, U.S. Treasury, Operation Smokescreen (1972) as Willoughby
- Emergency!, Body Language (1973) as Pete
- Dusty's Trail, Then There Were Seven (1973) as The Sheriff
- Gunsmoke, Talbott (1973) as Red
- The Streets of San Francisco, The Unicorn (1973) as Burt Logan
- The Quest, Seminole Negro Indian Scouts (1976)
- B. J. and the Bear, Odyssey of the Shady Truth (1979) as Seth
- 240-Robert, Stuntman (1979) as Harry Phillips

=== Theatrical films ===
- King Kong (1933) as Theatre Usher (uncredited)
- Murder in the Blue Room (1944) as Larry Dearden (credited as Bill MacWilliams).
- He Forgot to Remember to Forget (1944) as Mac, the Policeman (uncredited)
- Thirty Seconds Over Tokyo (1944) as Bud Felton
- Zombies on Broadway (1945) as Sailor / Smuggler (uncredited)
- Those Enduring Young Charms (1945) as Jerry
- The Body Snatcher (1945) as Survis, medical student (uncredited)
- Back to Bataan (1945) (uncredited)
- West of the Pecos (1945) as Tex Evans, stage guard (uncredited)
- Johnny Angel (1945) as Big Sailor (uncredited)
- Sing Your Way Home (1945) as Officer (uncredited)
- Deadline at Dawn (1946) as Alex Winkley
- Till the End of Time (1946) as Perry Kincheloe
- A Likely Story (1947) as Bill Baker
- A Woman's Secret (1949) as Lee Crenshaw
- The Stratton Story (1949) as Eddie Dibson
- The Clay Pigeon (1949) as Jim Fletcher
- Fighting Man of the Plains (1949) as Marshal Johnny Tancred
- A Dangerous Profession (1949) as Claude Brackett
- Blue Grass of Kentucky (1950) as Lin McIvor
- Operation Haylift (1950) as Bill Masters
- The Cariboo Trail (1950) as Mike Evans, Redfern's Partner
- Rookie Fireman (1950) as Joe Blake
- California Passage (1950) as Bob Martin
- Blue Blood (1951) as Bill Manning
- The Great Missouri Raid (1951) as Jim Younger
- The Last Outpost (1951) as Sgt. Tucker
- Havana Rose (1951) as Tex Thompson
- Rose of Cimarron (1952) as George Newcomb
- The Pace That Thrills (1952) as Richard L. "Dusty" Weston
- Son of Paleface (1952) as Kirk
- Torpedo Alley (1952) as Lt. Tom Graham
- Racing Blood (1954) as Tex
- The Outlaw's Daughter (1954) as Jess Raidley, a.k.a. Big Red
- Wiretapper (1955) as Jim Vaus, Jr.
- Apache Ambush (1955) as James Kingston
- Hell's Horizon (1955) as Paul Jenkins
- The Wild Dakotas (1956) as Jim Henry
- The Broken Star (1956) as Deputy Marshal Bill Gentry
- The Halliday Brand (1957) as Clay Halliday
- The Storm Rider (1957) as Sheriff Pete Colton
- Pawnee (1957) as Matt Delaney
- Slim Carter (1957) as Frank Hanneman
- Space Master X-7 (1958) as John Hand
- Legion of the Doomed (1958) as Lt. Smith
- Alaska Passage (1959) as Al Graham
- A Dog's Best Friend (1959) as Wesley "Wes" Thurman
- Oklahoma Territory (1960) as Temple Houston
- Hell to Eternity (1960) as Leonard
- The Sergeant Was a Lady (1961) as Col. House
- Law of the Lawless (1964) as Silas Miller
- A Letter to Nancy (1965) as George Reed
- Tickle Me (1965) as Deputy Sturdivant
- Spaceflight IC-1 (1965) as Capt. Mead Ralston
- Buckskin (1968) as Frank Cody
- Lady Godiva Rides (1969)
- Rio Lobo (1970) as Blackthorne Sheriff Pat Cronin
- Scandalous John (1971) as Sheriff Hart
- The Phantom of Hollywood (1974) as Fogel
- The Giant Spider Invasion (1975) as Dutch
- Moon Over the Alley (1976) as Sherry
- 69 Minutes (1977)
- A Fire in the Sky (1978) as Dale Turner
- Night of the Zombies (1981)
- Goldie and the Boxer Go To Hollywood (1981) as Cowboy Bob (final film role)
