= Blue Grass of Kentucky =

1950 film by William Beaudine

- Directed by: William Beaudine
- Written by: Scott Darling
- Produced by: Jeffrey Bernerd
- Starring: Bill Williams; Jane Nigh; Ralph Morgan
- Cinematography: Gilbert Warrenton
- Edited by: Roy V. Livingston; Otho Lovering
- Music by: Ozzie Caswell
- Production company: Jeffrey Bernerd Productions
- Distributed by: Monogram Pictures
- Release date: January 26, 1950
- Running time: 72 minutes
- Country: United States
- Language: English

Blue Grass of Kentucky is a 1950 American sports drama film directed by William Beaudine and starring Bill Williams, Jane Nigh and Ralph Morgan.

== Plot ==
Major Randolph McIvor's son Lin helps train his horses and his other son Sandy rides them. Their stable has fallen on hard times, but they are preparing their promising new thoroughbreds Encino and Tarzana for the Kentucky Derby.

Lin is in love with Armistead's daughter Pat, although her wealth intimidates him. Armistead has a star horse called Blue Grass that also will be a Kentucky Derby contender. No one but Pat knows that Blue Grass's sire was a different horse than the one that had been originally intended. A trainer named Layton files a formal complaint after Blue Grass wins the Kentucky Derby, claiming that the winner's pedigree can not be proven. However, he is fired and Pat agrees to marry Lin.

== Cast ==
- Bill Williams as Lin McIvor
- Jane Nigh as Pat Armistead
- Ralph Morgan as Maj. Randolph McIvor
- Russell Hicks as James B. Armistead
- Robert 'Buzz' Henry as Sandy McIvor
- Ted Hecht as Layton
- Dick Foote as Jim Brown
- Jack Howard as Armistead Jockey
- Bill Terrell as Pompey
- Stephen S. Harrison as Attendant
- Pierre Watkin as Head Steward
- Harry Lauter as Dick Wentworth

== Reception ==
In a contemporary review for The New York Times, critic A. H. Weiler wrote: "Although it is basically fodder for the railbirds, 'Blue Grass of Kentucky' ... has enough amiable ingredients to make this minor entry pleasant general fare. Not that this turf yarn is surprisingly different from some of the also-rans which have ambled in from the coast in the past. But Monogram has herein blended racing and romance fairly neatly and dressed it all up in Cinecolor, some of which is effective and some of which is not."

== See also ==
- List of films about horses
- List of films about horse racing

== Bibliography ==
- Marshall, Wendy L. William Beaudine: From Silents to Television. Scarecrow Press, 2005.
