= William Beaudine =

American film actor and director (1892–1970)

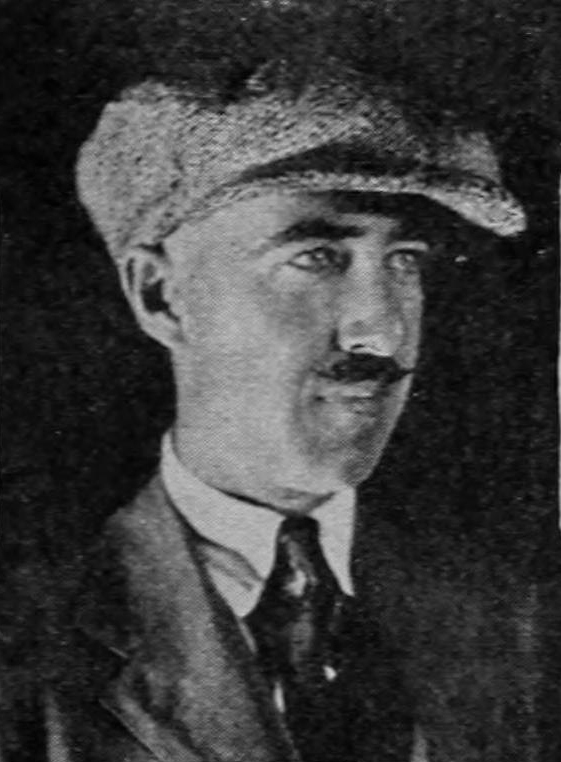
- Beaudine in 1920
- Born: William Washington Beaudine; January 15, 1892; New York City U.S.
- Died: March 18, 1970 (aged 78); Canoga Park, California, U.S.
- Resting place: Hollywood Forever Cemetery
- Occupations: Film director, actor
- Years active: 1913–1966
- Spouse: Marguerite Fleischer (m. 1914)
- Awards: Hollywood Walk of Fame; Motion Pictures; 1777 Vine Street

William Washington Beaudine (January 15, 1892 – March 18, 1970) was an American film director. He was one of Hollywood's most prolific directors, turning out a remarkable 179 feature-length films in a wide variety of genres.

He is best known today for his silent films Little Annie Rooney and Sparrows, both with Mary Pickford; the W. C. Fields comedy The Old Fashioned Way; several Bela Lugosi and Charlie Chan thrillers; Mom and Dad, a sex-education exploitation film; and the popular Bowery Boys comedies.

== Career ==
=== Biograph ===
Born in New York City, William Beaudine began his career in 1909 at age 17, with American Mutoscope and Biograph Company, remembered today as the first studio of movie pioneer D. W. Griffith. "I started as everybody's assistant," Beaudine recalled 60 years later. "I dished out water, painted properties, and cleaned the cuspidors. I was the assistant cameraman, assistant property man, and assistant director all rolled into one." There is no truth to the contention that William Beaudine served as Griffith's assistant on the ambitious feature films The Birth of a Nation and Intolerance; Beaudine later explained he was directing a short comedy on an adjoining lot while Intolerance was in production. On the Griffith lot, as Beaudine recalled, "D. W. had his name plastered all over the place." Beaudine had a special sign painted, emblazoned with his own name, and had a split-screen photograph displaying Griffith's enormous set alongside Beaudine's humble set.

In 1914 William Beaudine married Marguerite "Prody" Fleischer, one of Biograph's leading ladies, in 1914 and they stayed married until his death. Their daughter Helen was born in November 1915. Beaudine's brother Harold Beaudine was a director of short, action-filled comedies.

=== Jack-of-all-trades in comedy shorts ===
In 1915, William Beaudine was hired as an actor, writer, director, and producer by the Kalem Company, working on screen with comedian Bud Duncan in the "Bud and Bill" comedies. (A Kalem press release described the premise of the series: "Hard luck sticks to Bud and Bill like a burr or a horse's tail." By the time he was 23 Beaudine had directed his first picture, a short called Minnie the Tiger (Kalem, 1915), which he also produced. That same month he wrote, produced, and directed Almost a King.

Beaudine would continue to direct shorts exclusively until 1922, working with Billy Franey and Milburn Morante for the Joker company, Bobby Vernon for the Al Christie company, and Snub Pollard for the Hal Roach company.

== Early career as prestige director ==
Beaudine was very much in demand during the 1920s. He began making feature-length films for then-struggling Warner Bros., demonstrating his clever ways of making films look more expensive than their budgets. This efficiency became a hallmark of Beaudine's style. He directed silent films for Goldwyn Pictures (before it became part of MGM), Metro Pictures (also before MGM), First National Pictures, and Sol Lesser's Principal Pictures. In 1926 he made Sparrows, the story of orphans imprisoned in a swamp farm, starring Mary Pickford, and The Canadian, based upon a W. Somerset Maugham play and shot on location in Alberta with Thomas Meighan as the lead. Beaudine had at least 30 pictures to his credit before the sound era began. Among his first sound films were short Mack Sennett comedies; he made at least one film for Sennett while contractually bound elsewhere, resulting in his adopting the pseudonym "William Crowley." He would occasionally use the pseudonym in later years, usually as "William X. Crowley."

He ground out several movies annually for Warner Bros., Fox, Paramount, and Universal. His most famous credits of the early 1930s are The Mad Parade (1931), starring Evelyn Brent in the only World War I battlefield drama with an all-female cast (though men are occasionally heard and parts of their bodies are seen); Three Wise Girls (1932), Jean Harlow's first starring film; and The Old Fashioned Way (1934), a comedy about old-time show folks starring W. C. Fields.

=== Career in Britain and return to America ===
Beaudine was one of a number of experienced directors (including Raoul Walsh and Allan Dwan) who were brought to England from Hollywood in the 1930s to work on what were in all other respects very British productions. Beaudine directed 11 features there from 1935 through 1937, including Boys Will Be Boys (1935) and Where There's a Will (1936) starring Will Hay, and the George Formby comedy Feather Your Nest (1937).

Beaudine returned to America in 1937 and had trouble re-establishing himself at the major studios. Once widely known as an A-list director of important productions, Beaudine had commanded a premium salary in the late 1920s that Hollywood producers of the late 1930s didn't want to match. He worked briefly at Warner Bros., with whom he had been associated in Britain, and then waited for offers on his terms. They never came. Beaudine had lost much of his personal fortune through no fault of his own (a bank he bought an interest in had failed, and much of his income was claimed by the British government in taxes).

== Prolific B-movie career ==
In 1940 William Beaudine's career was in eclipse. "A couple of producers told me I was washed up. But making movies is what I do. It's what I know how to do, and I don't plan to stop now. I've got no regrets. I just have to start over."

Publicist-turned-producer Jed Buell approached Beaudine to direct an all-black-cast feature for Buell's Dixie National Pictures. The salary was a flat $500 for one week's work. Beaudine knew that if he accepted this job, he would henceforth be associated with low-budget films and would never command his old salary again, but with his finances at a low ebb Beaudine accepted the assignment, under his "William X. Crowley" alias.

Buell was pleased with Beaudine's professionalism and inventive ways to extend a shoestring budget. He hired Beaudine to direct Misbehaving Husbands (1940), noteworthy at the time as the comeback feature of silent-screen clown Harry Langdon. It was a humble comeback for both Langdon and Beaudine, since it was released by the tiny Producers Releasing Corporation, whose budgets seldom ventured beyond five figures. Langdon and Beaudine received critical raves for their work: "Preview house rewarded them with practically solid laughter" (Boxoffice); "Easily [Langdon's] best performance in years" (Motion Picture Daily). The film's success within its own market reestablished both Langdon and Beaudine, albeit in B pictures.

William Beaudine became a low-budget specialist, forsaking his artistic ambitions in favor of strictly commercial film fare, and recouping his financial losses through sheer volume of work. He made dozens of comedies, thrillers and melodramas with such popular personalities as Bela Lugosi, Ralph Byrd, Edmund Lowe, Jean Parker, and The East Side Kids. He became a fixture at the ambitious Monogram Pictures and directed fully half of the 48 comedy features starring The Bowery Boys. By this time Beaudine had a reputation for being a resourceful, no-nonsense director who could make feature films in a matter of days, sometimes as few as five. He occasionally directed special-interest productions, like the 1945 crusade-for-sex-education feature Mom and Dad, produced by Kroger Babb, and the 1950 religious drama Again Pioneers, produced by the Protestant Film Commission. Beaudine reflected on his long history of low-budget pictures: "These films are going to be made regardless of who directs them. There's a market for them and the studios are going to continue to make them. I've been doing this long enough, I think I can make them as good or better than anyone else."

Beaudine was often entrusted with series films, including the Torchy Blane, The East Side Kids, Jiggs and Maggie, The Shadow, Charlie Chan, and The Bowery Boys series. His efficiency was so well known that Walt Disney hired him to direct some of his television projects of the 1950s and had him direct a feature western, Ten Who Dared (1960). Beaudine became even busier in TV, directing Naked City, The Green Hornet, and dozens of Lassie episodes.

His last two feature films, both released in 1966, were the horror-westerns Billy the Kid vs. Dracula (with John Carradine) and Jesse James Meets Frankenstein's Daughter. Both were made specifically as a ready-made double feature for the drive-ins. His next film was to have been a screen biography of Lupe Vélez, produced by and starring Estelita Rodriguez, but the project died with Rodriguez in 1966 and Beaudine never made another film. By the end of the decade William Beaudine was the industry's oldest working professional, having started in 1909. His final screen credit was posthumous: The Green Hornet was compiled from the TV series and released as a feature film in 1974.

== Rediscovery ==
William Beaudine's career ended on a high note when film historians Kevin Brownlow and David Shepard unearthed a print of Beaudine's 1926 silent feature The Canadian in 1969. The film was so well received by modern audiences that the American Film Institute sent it out on a tour of revival screenings. Beaudine attended one of these screenings in February 1970: "You know, before tonight I had never seen this picture. In those days, you shot it and went on to the next one. Seeing it now, maybe I wasn't such a bad director after all. In fact, I was quite good in spots, and overall, it's a damn good film." After the screening, Beaudine told Brownlow, "Jesus, that did my ego a hell of a lot of good."

== Death ==
In March 1970 Beaudine caught a bad case of flu and, when his symptoms didn't improve, he was admitted to a hospital in Canoga Park, California. He died there on March 18, the official cause of death listed as uremic poisoning.

== Legacy ==
In 1980, in their tongue-in-cheek book The Golden Turkey Awards, Michael and Harry Medved included William Beaudine in their list of worst directors of all time. They gave him the unflattering nickname "One-Shot," because he always seemed to shoot just one take, regardless of actors flubbing their lines or special effects malfunctioning. It is true that Beaudine shot economically—he usually had no choice—but he was always professional, and actually did shoot multiple takes of movie scenes. (The coming-attractions trailers of Beaudine's films are rife with alternate takes.)

The Academy Film Archive has preserved three films directed by William Beaudine: Little Annie Rooney, Mom and Dad, and A Husband in Haste.

== Selected filmography ==
The following is a listing of the theatrically released, feature-length films directed by William Beaudine. Short subjects and television productions are not included.

=== 1920s ===
1. Watch Your Step (1922)
2. Catch My Smoke (1922)
3. Heroes of the Street (1922)
4. Her Fatal Millions (1923)
5. Penrod and Sam (1923)
6. The Printer's Devil (1923)
7. The Country Kid (1923)
8. Boy of Mine (1923)
9. Daring Youth (1924)
10. Wandering Husbands (1924) a.k.a. Love and Lies
11. Daughters of Pleasure (1924) a.k.a. Beggars on Horseback
12. A Self-Made Failure (1924) a.k.a. The Goof
13. Cornered (1924)
14. Lover's Lane (1924) unconfirmed
15. The Narrow Street (1925)
16. A Broadway Butterfly (1925)
17. How Baxter Butted In (1925)
18. Little Annie Rooney (1925)
19. That's My Baby (1926)
20. Sparrows (1926)
21. The Social Highwayman (1926)
22. Hold That Lion (1926)
23. The Canadian (1926)
24. Frisco Sally Levy (1927)
25. The Life of Riley (1927)
26. The Irresistible Lover (1927)
27. The Cohens and the Kellys in Paris (1928)
28. Heart to Heart (1928)
29. Home, James (1928)
30. Do Your Duty (1928)
31. Give and Take (1928)
32. Fugitives (1929)
33. Two Weeks Off (1929)
34. Hard to Get (1929) a.k.a. Classified
35. The Girl from Woolworth's (1929)
36. Wedding Rings (1929) a.k.a. The Dark Swan

=== 1930s ===
1. Those Who Dance (1930)
2. Road to Paradise (1930)
3. Father's Son (1931)
4. Misbehaving Ladies (1931)
5. The Lady Who Dared (1931)
6. The Mad Parade (1931) a.k.a. Forgotten Women
7. Penrod and Sam (1931)
8. Men in Her Life (1931)
9. Three Wise Girls (1932)
10. Make Me a Star (1932)
11. The Crime of the Century (1933)
12. Her Bodyguard (1933)
13. The Old Fashioned Way (1934)
14. Two Hearts in Harmony (1935)
15. So You Won't Talk (1935)
16. Dandy Dick (1935)
17. Boys Will Be Boys (1935)
18. Get Off My Foot (1935)
19. Mr. Cohen Takes a Walk (1935)
20. Where There's a Will (1936)
21. Educated Evans (1936)
22. It's in the Bag (1936)
23. Windbag the Sailor (1936)
24. Feather Your Nest (1937)
25. Said O'Reilly to McNab (1937)
26. Take It from Me (1937)
27. Torchy Gets Her Man (1938)
28. Torchy Blane in Chinatown (1939)

=== 1940s ===
1. She Done Him Right (1940)
2. Four Shall Die (1940) a.k.a. Condemned Men
3. Misbehaving Husbands (1940)
4. Up Jumped the Devil (1941)
5. Emergency Landing (1941)
6. Federal Fugitives (1941) a.k.a. International Spy
7. Desperate Cargo (1941)
8. Mr. Celebrity (1941)
9. The Miracle Kid (1941)
10. Blonde Comet (1941)
11. Duke of the Navy (1942)
12. Broadway Big Shot (1942)
13. Lucky Ghost (1942) a.k.a. Lady Luck
14. Professor Creeps (1942)
15. The Panther's Claw (1942)
16. Men of San Quentin (1942)
17. Gallant Lady (1942) a.k.a. Prison Girl
18. One Thrilling Night (1942)
19. Phantom Killer (1942)
20. Foreign Agent (1942)
21. The Living Ghost (1942)
22. The Ape Man (1943)
23. Clancy Street Boys (1943)
24. Spotlight Scandals (1943) a.k.a. Spotlight Revue (reissue title)
25. Ghosts on the Loose (1943)
26. Here Comes Kelly (1943)
27. Mr. Muggs Steps Out (1943)
28. Mystery of the 13th Guest (1943)
29. What a Man! (1944)
30. Voodoo Man (1944)
31. Hot Rhythm (1944)
32. Detective Kitty O'Day (1944)
33. Follow the Leader (1944)
34. Leave It to the Irish (1944)
35. Oh, What a Night (1944)
36. Shadow of Suspicion (1944)
37. Bowery Champs (1944)
38. Crazy Knights (1944) a.k.a. Murder in the Family (TV abridgment)
39. Mom and Dad (1945)
40. Adventures of Kitty O'Day (1945)
41. Fashion Model (1945)
42. Blonde Ransom (1945)
43. Swingin' on a Rainbow (1945)
44. Come Out Fighting (1945)
45. Black Market Babies (1945)
46. Girl on the Spot (1946)
47. The Face of Marble (1946)
48. One Exciting Week (1946)
49. Don't Gamble with Strangers (1946)
50. Below the Deadline (1946) a.k.a. Jumping Joe (TV abridgment)
51. Spook Busters (1946)
52. Mr. Hex (1946)
53. Philo Vance Returns (1947) a.k.a. Infamous Crimes (TV title)
54. Hard Boiled Mahoney (1947)
55. Too Many Winners (1947)
56. Killer at Large (1947) a.k.a. Gangway for Murder and Syndicated Murder (TV abridgments)
57. Gas House Kids Go West (1947)
58. News Hounds (1947)
59. Bowery Buckaroos (1947)
60. The Chinese Ring (1947)
61. Angels' Alley (1947)
62. Jinx Money (1948)
63. The Shanghai Chest (1948)
64. The Golden Eye (1948)
65. Smugglers' Cove (1948)
66. Incident (1948)
67. Kidnapped (1948)
68. Jiggs and Maggie in Court (1948)
69. The Feathered Serpent (1948)
70. The Lawton Story (1949)
71. Tuna Clipper (1949)
72. Forgotten Women (1949)
73. Trail of the Yukon (1949) (as William X. Crowley)
74. Jiggs and Maggie in Jackpot Jitters (1949)
75. Tough Assignment (1949)

=== 1950s ===
1. Blue Grass of Kentucky (1950)
2. Blonde Dynamite (1950)
3. Jiggs and Maggie Out West (1950)
4. Lucky Losers (1950)
5. County Fair (1950)
6. Second Chance (1950)
7. Blues Busters (1950)
8. Again Pioneers (1950)
9. A Wonderful Life (1951)
10. Bowery Battalion (1951)
11. Cuban Fireball (1951)
12. Ghost Chasers (1951)
13. Let's Go Navy! (1951)
14. Havana Rose (1951)
15. Crazy Over Horses (1951)
16. The Congregation (1951)
17. Rodeo (1952)
18. Hold That Line (1952)
19. Jet Job (1952)
20. Here Come the Marines (1952)
21. The Rose Bowl Story (1952)
22. Bela Lugosi Meets a Brooklyn Gorilla (1952)
23. Feudin' Fools (1952)
24. No Holds Barred (1952)
25. Jalopy (1953)
26. Born to the Saddle (1953)
27. Roar of the Crowd (1953)
28. Murder Without Tears (1953)
29. Yukon Vengeance (1954)
30. Paris Playboys (1954)
31. Pride of the Blue Grass (1954)
32. High Society (1955)
33. Jail Busters (1955)
34. Westward Ho, the Wagons! (1956)
35. Up in Smoke (1957)
36. In the Money (1958)

=== 1960s ===
1. Ten Who Dared (1960)
2. Billy the Kid Versus Dracula (1966)
3. Jesse James Meets Frankenstein's Daughter (1966)

=== 1970s ===
1. The Green Hornet (1974, compiled from episodes of the TV series)
