= Jane Nigh =

American actress

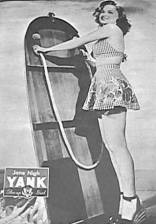
- Nigh in 1944
- Born: Bonnie Lenora Nigh; February 25, 1925
- Died: October 5, 1993 (aged 68); Bakersfield, California, U.S.
- Education: Los Angeles Polytechnic High School; Long Beach Junior College
- Occupation: Actress
- Years active: 1944–1961
- Spouses: Victor Cutler (m. 1946; div. 1946) John E. Baker (m. 1952; div. 1961) Norman Davidson, Jr. (m. 1963; div. 1964) (m. 1966; div. 1968)
- Children: 4

Bonnie Lenora "Jane" Nigh (February 25, 1925 – October 5, 1993) was an American actress who appeared in more than 40 films and television shows.

== Early years ==
Jane Nigh was born Bonnie Lenora Nigh in Hollywood, California, on February 25, 1925. She graduated from Los Angeles Polytechnic High School and Long Beach Junior College, and her interest in acting began while she was in college. Her sister Nancy was also an actress, and her mother worked in research at a film studio. Nigh worked as a stenographer at a Sears Roebuck store before she became an actress, and she participated in amateur theatrical productions.

== Career ==
She was discovered in 1944 by Arthur Wenzler while working in a defense plant. (A published source says that she was a typist in an office in Long Beach and identifies Ivan Kahn as the 20th Century Fox talent scout who suggested a screen test after one of her co-workers sent her picture to the studio.) That same year she signed a five-year contract with Fox, and joined the studio's stock company. Her first screen appearance was in the major motion picture Laura. She continued to play incidental roles in Fox features, including State Fair (1945), Dragonwyck (1946), and Give My Regards to Broadway (1948, as June Nigh).

When her Fox contract lapsed, she began freelancing and appeared in minor features for Columbia, RKO, and Robert L. Lippert. In 1949, she participated in a Life magazine photo layout, in which she posed with up-and-coming actresses Marilyn Monroe, Lois Maxwell, Cathy Downs, Suzanne Dalbert, Enrica Soma, and Laurette Luez. This led to a contract with Monogram Pictures, where at last Jane Nigh received starring roles. She was usually cast in wholesome outdoor features filmed in Cinecolor, including County Fair (1950), Blue Grass of Kentucky (1950), and Rodeo (1952).

In 1952 Nigh joined the cast of the TV series Big Town, with Patrick McVey as the city editor of a newspaper, and Nigh as his secretary Lorelei Kilbourne. She played the role for two seasons. She remained a working actress in television through 1961, returning to the motion-picture screen only once, back at Monogram (renamed Allied Artists); she was featured as a dumb blonde in Hold That Hypnotist (1957) with The Bowery Boys.

== Personal life and death ==
Nigh was married four times, to three men, all ending in divorce. Her marriage to actor Victor Cutler in 1946 lasted six weeks, with their divorce granted in September of that year. She married Navy lieutenant John Baker on March 15, 1952, in Las Vegas. They separated on November 9, 1959, and they were divorced in September 1961. She was married twice to Norman Davidson Jr. They married on March 18, 1963, in Los Angeles and separated on February 11. They were divorced on July 28, 1964.

She had four children, three girls and a boy, though her first, a girl, died very soon after birth in 1952.

On Tuesday, October 5, 1993, Nigh died of a stroke at the age of 68. She was survived by her sister, two children and two grandchildren.

== Filmography ==
Films
Year	Title	Role	Notes
1944	Laura	Secretary	Uncredited
1944	Something for the Boys	Army Wife	Uncredited
1945	State Fair	Eleanor	
1945	House of Dracula	Villager	Uncredited
1946	Whistle Stop	Josie Veech	
1946	Dragonwyck	Tabitha Wells	Uncredited
1947	The Shocking Miss Pilgrim	Cynthia's Sister	(scenes deleted)
1947	Unconquered	Evelyn	
1948	Sitting Pretty	Mabel Phillips	Uncredited
1948	Give My Regards to Broadway	May Norwick	
1948	Cry of the City	Nurse	Uncredited
1948	Leather Gloves	Cathy	
1949	Red, Hot and Blue	Angelica Roseanne aka No-No	
1949	Zamba	Carol	
1949	Fighting Man of the Plains	Florence Peel	
1949	Captain Carey, U.S.A.	Nancy	
1950	Blue Grass of Kentucky	Pat Armistead	
1950	Operation Haylift	Pat Rogers	
1950	Motor Patrol	Sherry Bliss	
1950	County Fair	Loretta Ryan	
1950	Border Treasure	Stella	
1950	Rio Grande Patrol	Sherry Bliss	
1951	Blue Blood	Eileen Buchanan	
1951	Disc Jockey	Marion	
1952	Fort Osage	Ann Pickett	
1952	Rodeo	Nancy Cartwright	
1952	The Hitchhiker Was a Lady	Helena Bruce	From The
1957	Hold That Hypnotist	Cleo Daniels	
