= Lawrence Gray (disambiguation) =

Lawrence Gray was an actor.

Lawrence Gray may also refer to:

- Lawrence Gray (singer)
- Laurie Gray, English cricketer and umpire

== See also ==
- Lawrence Grey (disambiguation)
