= Broadway Big Shot =

1942 film

- Film poster
- Directed by: William Beaudine
- Written by: Martin Mooney
- Produced by: Jed Buell
- Starring: Ralph Byrd
- Cinematography: Jack Greenhalgh
- Distributed by: Producers Releasing Corporation
- Release date: February 6, 1942
- Running time: 59 minutes
- Country: United States
- Language: English

Broadway Big Shot is a 1942 American drama film directed by William Beaudine.

== Plot ==
A reporter confesses to a crime in order to get into prison for an interview. Then he can't get out.

== Cast ==
- Ralph Byrd as Jimmy O'Brien
- Virginia Vale as Betty Collins
- William Halligan as Warden Collins
- Dick Rich as Tom Barnes
- Herbert Rawlinson as District Attorney
- Cecil Weston as Mrs. Briggs
- Tom Herbert as Carnation Charlie
- Stubby Kruger as Dynamite (as Harold Kruger)
- Frank Hagney as Butch
- Jack Buckley as Windy
- Harry Depp as Ben Marlo
