= Slippy McGee (1948 film) =

1948 film by Albert H. Kelley

- Directed by: Albert H. Kelley
- Screenplay by: Jerome Gruskin; Norman S. Hall
- Story by: Marie Conway
- Produced by: Lou Brock
- Starring: Don "Red" Barry; Dale Evans; Tom Brown; Harry Cheshire; James Seay; Murray Alper
- Cinematography: John MacBurnie
- Edited by: Lester Orlebeck
- Music by: Mort Glickman
- Production company: Republic Pictures
- Distributed by: Republic Pictures
- Release date: January 15, 1948
- Running time: 65 minutes
- Country: United States
- Language: English

Slippy McGee is a 1948 American crime film directed by Albert H. Kelley, written by Jerome Gruskin and Norman S. Hall, and starring Don "Red" Barry, Dale Evans, Tom Brown, Harry Cheshire, James Seay and Murray Alper. It was released on January 15, 1948, by Republic Pictures.

== Plot ==
After he and a pair of accomplices, Al and Red, pull a $50,000 diamond heist, Slippy McGee separates from them and plans to hide out for a while in Middleton, a small town. A motorcycle-riding priest, Father Shanley, gives him a lift, then expresses his gratitude after Slippy saves a young boy from being hit by a truck.

In town, nurse Mary Hunter is asked by Dr. Moore to treat the newcomer's injuries. Slippy's monogram being noticed in his hat, he makes up the name "Steve Martin" on the spot. Mary's attentions to the patient stirs jealousy in suitor Tom Eustis, the richest man in town. Mary's rejection of his proposal infuriates Eustis, who sets out to ruin her father in business.

Al and Red turn up in town and decide to rob the bank. Suspicion falls on Slippy, who confronts his former partners and ends up killing Red in self-defense. When he decides to turn himself in to the law, Mary and others from Middleton say they'll vouch for his character and expect his return.

== Cast ==
- Don "Red" Barry as Slippy McGee
- Dale Evans as Mary Hunter
- Tom Brown as Father Shanley
- Harry Cheshire as Dr. Moore
- James Seay as Thomas Eustis
- Murray Alper as Red
- Dick Elliott as Fred Appelby
- Maude Eburne as Mrs. Dexter
- Raymond Largay as John Hunter
- Eddie Acuff as Charlie
- Michael Carr as Al
- Georgie Nokes as Tommy
