= Duke of the Navy =

1942 film by William Beaudine

- DVD cover
- Directed by: William Beaudine
- Screenplay by: William Beaudine; Gerald Drayson Adams; John T. Coyle
- Story by: William Beaudine; Gerald Drayson Adams; John T. Coyle
- Produced by: John T. Coyle
- Starring: Ralph Byrd; Stubby Kruger; Veda Ann Borg
- Cinematography: Mack Stengler
- Edited by: Guy V. Thayer Jr.
- Music by: Clarence Wheeler
- Production company: Producers Releasing Corporation
- Distributed by: Producers Releasing Corporation
- Release date: January 1942
- Running time: 65 minutes
- Country: United States
- Language: English

Duke of the Navy is a 1942 comedy film that was directed by William Beaudine from a screenplay by Beaudine, Gerald Drayson Adams, and John T. Coyle. It stars Ralph Byrd as Bill "Breezy" Duke, Stubby Kruger as Dan "Cookie" Cook, and Veda Ann Borg as Maureen.

The film centers on sailors Breezy, who disguises himself as heir to a company fortune, and his friend Cookie, as they become part of a sophisticated con scheme. Produced and distributed by independent film company Producers Releasing Corporation and released on January 23, 1942, it has received generally negative reviews from critics and authors.

== Plot ==
Along with his friend Dan "Cookie" Cook (Stubby Kruger), Bill "Breezy" Duke (Ralph Byrd), a sailor who disguises himself as the heir to the Duke Chocolate Company fortune, goes on furlough from his navy job. While the duo hitchhike, Mrs. Duke (Margaret Armstrong), who is part of the true Duke Chocolate family, picks them up. She finds herself entertained by Breezy's pose, and, while she is out of town for a month, she grants them permission to stay at her suite, located at the Coral Beach Hotel. While there, Cookie and Breezy become very popular. "General" Courtney (Herbert Corthell), who is also staying at the hotel, poses as a general with much fortune. He plots with "Sniffy" Higgins (Val Stanton), who poses as his valet, to entice Breezy into a con game to steal the Duke fortune. Courtney hires a woman named Maureen (Veda Ann Borg) to pretend to be his daughter. Maureen fakes fainting while in an elevator with Breezy and Cookie, so the duo carry her to Courtney's hotel room. They all get to know each other, and Breezy and Cookie become fascinated with Courtney's stories of adventure. Courtney asks them to become part of his search for buried pirate treasure, and Breezy and Cookie accept. When Courtney asks for two thousand dollars for expenses, Breezy and Cookie go to their fellow sailors and convince them to come up with the money. Unknown to them, Courtney uses the money to pay for the boat and his hotel bill.

After they arrive at the island which supposedly contains the treasure, Breezy and Cookie are introduced to "Professor Bisbee," (Paul Bryar) a con artist whose real name is Bunco, who is in cahoots with Courtney and has buried fake treasure on the island. Breezy and Cookie then dig up a chest of jewels, and that night, Breezy becomes engaged to Maureen. Going with the scheme, Bunco tells the duo to give him half interest in the proceeds from the jewels as they were discovered on his island. He demands he receive $40,000 collateral. Breezy panics, and claims to Bunco that he has no large checking account. Courtney pretends that he will write the check and take the money from Breezy later. When Bunco, Courtney and Sniffy realize that Cookie and Breezy found a chest of real riches, Bunco and Sniffy begin a scheme to rob them of the jewels. Breezy overhears their discussion and confides in Courtney, who then inserts some sleeping powder in Duke chocolate bars and gives them to the black guards. Sniffy becomes suspicious, so Courtney knocks him out, and then Breezy, Cookie, Maureen and Courtney escape via plane. When the plane is airborne, Sniffy and Bunco reveal themselves from their hiding spots and demand that Breezy and Cookie jump from the plane. Breezy starts fighting with Bunco, however, in the commotion, the treasure chest falls out of the plane becoming lost. After taking Bunco and Sniffy hostage, Breezy tells Maureen and the General his true identity. The swindlers are arrested, and Breezy returns to the Navy base. Cookie tells everyone the news that Bunco was a federal fugitive, and for capturing him, he and Breezy have won a $10,000 reward, which they use to repay their friends. Later, Cookie drives Breezy and Maureen to become married, and they give a ride to a hitchhiking Courtney along the way.

== Production ==
Duke of the Navy was directed by William Beaudine, and produced by John T. Coyle. It was written by Beaudine and Coyle, along with Gerald Drayson Adams. The three men also wrote the film's story. It was produced by Coyle as well. Music for the film was done by Clarence Wheeler, while cinematography was done by Mack Stengler. Guy V. Thayer Jr. served as the film's editor. The film's production company was independent film studio Producers Releasing Corporation, who also distributed the film.

The film starred Ralph Byrd as Bill "Breezy" Duke, who at the time was best known for his role as Dick Tracy in the 1937 serial of the same name. The film was an attempt to make a "light funster" out of Byrd. Olympic swimmer Stubby Kruger co-starred in the film as Breezy's friend, Dan "Cookie" Cook. Veda Ann Borg played Maureen; author John Cocchi felt she was miscast in the role.

== Release ==
Duke of the Navy was released into theaters on January 23, 1942. It has received negative reviews from critics and authors alike. Wheeler W. Dixon, in his book Producers Releasing Corporation: A Comprehensive Filmography and History, called the film "nonsense" and wrote that "they [the cast] were unable to lend any help to a script dead set against everybody concerned." Hal Erickson wrote that the film was "haphazard enough to have been written by a committee." Adversely, author John Cocchi wrote that "Ralph Byrd seizes his best comedy opportunity here" and that the "pleasant outdoor locales replace the often cramped sets of many of the company releases." He reserved special praise for a scene where Courtney turns down a card sharp scheme to con Breezy and Cookie as it was used in the 1941 screwball comedy film The Lady Eve, which he called "priceless."

Alpha Video released Duke of the Navy on DVD on October 30, 2012.
