= The Wonder Man (film) =

1920 film by John G. Adolfi

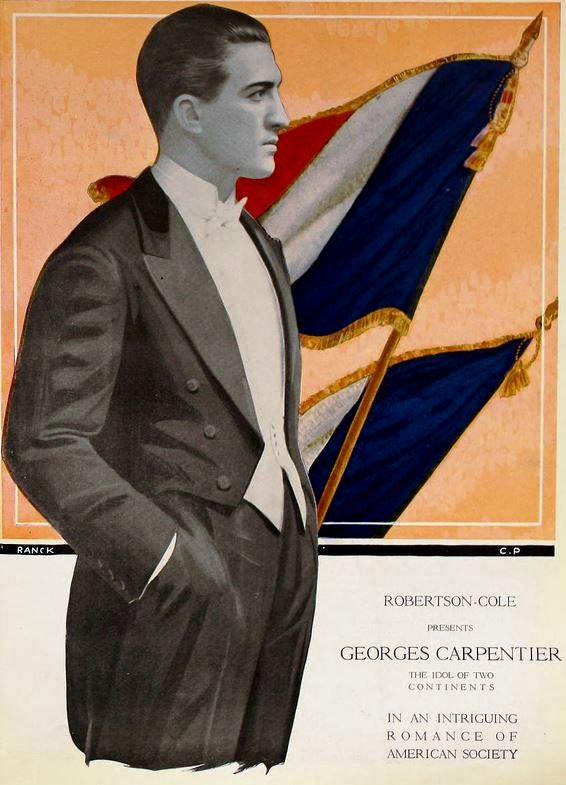
- Theatrical poster
- Directed by: John G. Adolfi
- Written by: Joseph Farnham
- Starring: Georges Carpentier; Faire Binney
- Cinematography: Georges Benoît
- Distributed by: Robertson-Cole Pictures Corporation
- Release date: May 29, 1920
- Running time: 70 min.
- Country: United States
- Language: Silent (English intertitles)

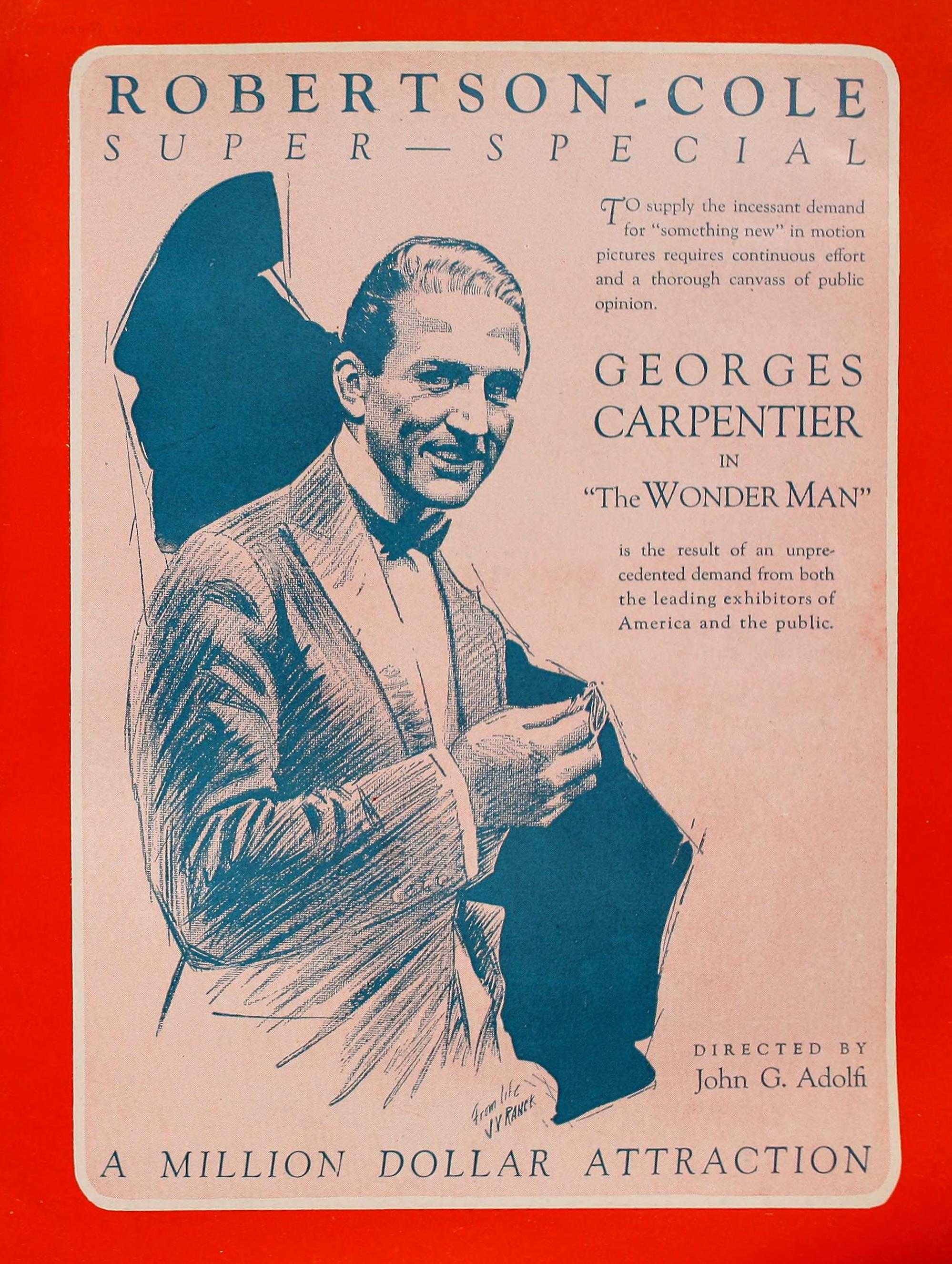
1920 ad

The Wonder Man is a 1920 American silent adventure drama film directed by John G. Adolfi and starring Georges Carpentier.

== Cast ==
- Georges Carpentier as Henri D'Alour
- Faire Binney as Dorothy Stoner
- Florence Billings as Mrs. Stoner
- Downing Clarke as Mr. Stoner
- Cecil Owen as Mr. Robbins
- Robert Barrat as Alan Gardner
- William Halligan as Bubbles
- Pat Hartigan as Monroe
- John Burkell as Butler
