= Fighting Man of the Plains =

1949 film by Edwin L. Marin

- Directed by: Edwin L. Marin
- Screenplay by: Frank Gruber
- Based on: Fighting Man; 1948 novel by Frank Gruber
- Produced by: Nat Holt
- Starring: Randolph Scott; Bill Williams; Victor Jory; Jane Nigh
- Cinematography: Fred Jackman Jr.
- Edited by: Philip Martin
- Music by: Paul Sawtell
- Color process: Cinecolor
- Production company: Nat Holt Productions
- Distributed by: 20th Century Fox
- Release date: November 16, 1949
- Running time: 94 minutes
- Country: United States
- Language: English

Fighting Man of the Plains is a 1949 American Western film produced by Nat Holt and directed by Edwin L. Marin. It starred Randolph Scott, Bill Williams, Victor Jory, and Jane Nigh. The supporting cast included Joan Taylor, Barry Kelley, Douglas Kennedy, Paul Fix, Rhys Williams, James Millican and, in his first credited role, Dale Robertson as Jesse James.

== Plot ==
Jim Dancer (Scott) is one of Quantrill's Raiders and a close friend of Jesse James (Robertson). They are involved in the Lawrence Massacre, during which Dancer kills Theodore Slocum after mistaking him for his brother Bert Slocum (Kelley), the man responsible for the death of Dancer's own brother. Theodore Slocum's daughter Evelyn (Taylor) witnesses the killing and learns Dancer's name but cannot later recognise him. After the Civil War ends, Dancer becomes a wanted outlaw and is eventually captured by detective George Cummings (Millican). Dancer learns from Cummings that he killed the wrong Slocum. They come to a river crossing near Lanyard, Kansas, the man in charge of the barge notices the cuffs around Dancers hands and winks at him. As they bring the horses onto the barge and get moving, the oarsman slaps the horse in the rear with the paddle which panics the horses. Cummings is hit by a hoof and falls overboard, taking Dancer with him as they are handcuffed together. Cummings drowns and Dancer, still shackled to him, collapses on the riverbank.

They are found by Lanyard citizens next day, including gambler Dave Oldham (Jory) and saloonkeeper Florence Peel (Nigh). Dancer says he is Cummings and that his captive has drowned. Dave and Florence know he is lying but stay quiet for the present. As Cummings, Dancer retires from the detective agency and becomes a railroad worker. He is in Lanyard when the line is completed and discovers that his enemy Bert Slocum is the town boss who owns most of the property there. When a group of cowboys go on the rampage and try to assault Evelyn, Dancer rescues her and is obliged to outdraw and kill the ringleader. The townsfolk plead with him to become Town Marshal but he refuses. Dave and Florence confront him and tell him they know he is not Cummings so he agrees to take office.

Aided by his psychotic associate Johnny Tancred (Williams), Slocum sets about trying to monopolise the town and its surrounding territory including the railroad run by Charles Lanyard (Harry Cheshire), the town's founder. Slocum is suspicious of the Marshal and summons Cliff Bailey (Berry Kroeger), a Chicago detective who knew Cummings, to identify him. Bailey is an old friend of Dave Oldham who tells him the full story and, realising that Slocum is crooked, Bailey confirms that the Marshal is George Cummings.

Dancer's cover is blown, however, when he is recognised by an outlaw called Yancey (Fix) who is a former Quantrill man. Dancer is obliged to resign and Tancred takes over as Marshal, releasing Yancey and his friends from jail. They kill Oldham and other leading citizens. Dancer is arrested and Tancred, encouraged by Slocum, stages a kangaroo court trial which ends with Dancer being "sentenced" to hang for the murder of Slocum's brother. Tancred and Yancey tell Slocum they are going to rob his bank and leave the town, so Slocum will be bankrupt.

Meanwhile, Charles Lanyard has had a similar idea and has taken steps to deal with Slocum by hiring the James–Younger Gang to rob the bank. The gang arrive as Dancer is being led down the main street to a hanging tree. Tancred realises they have no rope and shouts for one. Jesse James rides forward with his rope. A shootout begins after Yancey recognises James. Slocum, Tancred and Yancey are all shot dead.

James invites Dancer to join his gang but Dancer declines. James tells him they are equal now after Dancer once saved his life and the gang ride away. Dancer has realised that Florence loves him and the finale shows them hurrying towards each other.

== Cast ==
- Randolph Scott as Jim Dancer
- Bill Williams as Johnny Tancred
- Victor Jory as Dave Oldham
- Jane Nigh as Florence Peel
- Douglas Kennedy as Ken Vedder
- Joan Taylor as Evelyn Slocum
- James Todd as Hobson
- Rhys Williams as Chandler Leach
- Barry Kelley as Bert Slocum
- Berry Kroeger as Cliff Bailey
- Paul Fix as Yancey
- James Millican as George Cummings
- Dale Robertson as Jesse James
- Burk Symon as Meeker
- Herbert Rawlinson as Banker
- J. Farrell MacDonald as Partridge
- Harry Cheshire as Charles Lanyard
- James Griffith as William Quantrill

== See also ==
- List of films and television shows about the American Civil War
