= Evan-Burrows Fontaine =

American actress

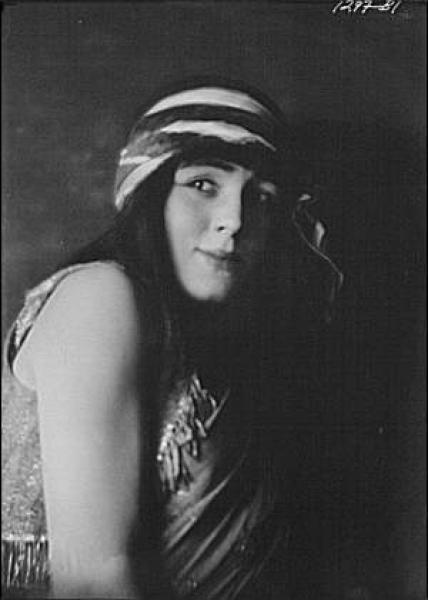
- Library of Congress
- Born: October 3, 1898; Huron, Hill County, Texas, US
- Died: December 27, 1984 (aged 86); Winchester, Virginia, US
- Other names: Evan Burrows Fontaine
- Occupation: Dancer
- Spouses: Sterling Lawrence Adair (m. 1918; ann. 1920) Harold “Stubby” Kruger (m. 1928; div. 1935): Jack Lynch
- Children: 2

Evan-Burrows Fontaine (October 3, 1898 – December 27, 1984) was an American Denishawn-trained interpretive dancer and actress whose career suffered after she became entangled in a breach of promise lawsuit with a member of one of America's wealthiest families.

== Early life ==
Evan-Burrows Fontaine was born on October 3, 1898, in Huron, Texas, a present-day ghost town with the Cedar Creek Baptist Church as its last surviving structure. She was the daughter of William Winston Spotswood Fontaine, an accountant who would later become general manager of the Alamo Cottonseed Company and Florence West Evans, the daughter of a Dallas life insurance agent. Her family later moved to Dallas, where by the turn of the twentieth century they were boarders at a rooming house owned by her maternal grandparents. Fontaine's paternal 3rd great-grandmother was Martha Henry, daughter of American founding father Patrick Henry. Her grandfather, William Winston Fontaine, served in the American Civil War as a colonel under Confederate generals, Stonewall Jackson and J.E.B. Stuart. After the war he taught at Baylor Female College in Independence, Texas and later held the chair of Latin for a decade at the University of Texas. Not much is known here about Fontaine’s early life except that by 1915 she was living with her mother in New York City and that at an early age she traveled to California where she became a protégée of dancer Ruth St. Denis. Later she would claim she was also trained by Emile Jaques-Dalcroze, but this has yet to be verified.

== Career ==
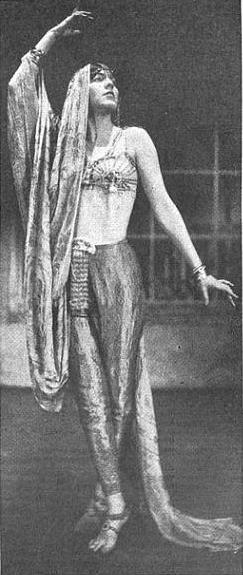
Evan-Burrows Fontaine - Ziegfeld’s Midnight Follies (1919)

Fontaine was taught the Dance Egyptienne by St. Denis’ husband, choreographer Ted Shawn, one of several dances Shawn would teach her based on his interpretation of Javanese ceremonial dancing. Fontaine’s stage debut may have occurred on December 16, 1914, when she performed Shawn’s Syvillia in a production staged by St. Denis’ company at the Ye Liberty Playhouse in Oakland, California. The next year she was booked to perform the traditional Jockey Dance at an annual celebration that follows the running of the Saratoga Cup in upstate New York. Fontaine went on to tour nationally with dancer and future film actor Kenneth Harlan before joining the Ziegfeld Follies where she would later shine in Ziegfeld’s Midnight Follies (1919). Around this time she also appeared in The Ed Wynn Carnival as the Queen of the Nile at New York’s Amsterdam Theater. Fontaine was among a group of entertainers who in 1919 donated their talents to a benefit costume ball held on behalf of blind war veterans at Manhattan’s Ritz-Carlton. The next year at the Casino Theatre (Broadway) Fontaine helped put on a memorial charity show that honored the actor Frank Carter on the first anniversary of his death. In 1920 Fontaine worked on three motion pictures, Madonnas and Men, playing the dual roles of Nerissa and Ninon, Women Men Love as Moira Lamson, and as a dancer in A Romantic Adventuress. Within a few years though, Fontaine would be limited to performing her “Oriental style” dancing at cabarets and nightclubs as her sensational court battles with a member of one of America’s wealthiest families most likely derailed any chance she had of attaining future stardom in New York or Los Angeles. What also should have or karmically so derailed her future stardom was that on New Year’s Day in 1925, Fontaine brutally beat Jennie Harrison, her African-American household worker. Jennie rightfully demand that Fontaine pay her after being denied pay for three weeks. Harrison’s request was met with a coat hanger and Harrison claimed that Fontaine, “in a rage, thrust a revolver under her nose.” (42)

A performance by Fontaine was incorporated in the 1921 novel Beauty, by Rupert Hughes:

Then a dancer came forth on the full stage in an American Orientalism. She was no less a personage than Evan Burrows Fontaine and she danced with grave passion. She wore trousers of cloth of gold. Her shoulders and her waist were bare, with jeweled disks and chains across the breast; and her bare feet were jeweled. She told a gloomy story in a rhapsody of posture and transition. Larrick was spellbound with the drama and with the flight of beautiful moments and colors, following pell-mell as in a kaleidoscope whirled at top speed.

== Early target of paparazzi ==
Eyebrows were raised when in late 1919 the press published a photograph (right) of Fontaine jogging along the Hudson River in stockings, clad in a heavy hooded sweater and workout shorts; something that would have probably gone unnoticed a few years later.

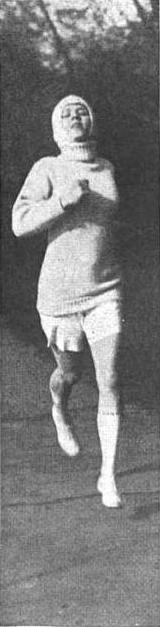
Evan-Burrows Fontaine - New York City (1919)

== Marriage ==
On April 18, 1918, Fontaine married Sterling Lawrence Adair, a young sailor from Houston, Texas, whom she had met on a train ride the year before. Their marriage was annulled in February 1920, around the time she became involved with millionaire Cornelius Vanderbilt Whitney. This relationship collapsed when Whitney became engaged to Marie Norton, sometime before Fontaine gave birth to a baby boy that December. On January 14 of the following year, Sterling Adair was found shot to death at his Oak Wood apartment in south Dallas. A police homicide investigation would prove inconclusive and a later coroner’s jury would rule Adair probably died by his own hand.

== Legal battles ==
In the summer of 1922 Fontaine filed what would turn out to be the first of several lawsuits against Cornelius “Sonny” Vanderbilt Whitney, claiming he had broken his pledge to marry her and that he was the father of her son. Whitney’s attorneys countered that Fontaine was still married to Adair at the time of the proposal and that the date of her marriage annulment was contrived by Fontaine and her mother. Over the next several months the case would become headline fodder for the national press; in the end though, Whitney’s attorneys prevailed and the case was dismissed. After the trial’s end, Fontaine and her mother were arrested for perjury; charges that were in due course vacated by a judge. Fontaine continued the battle with subsequent lawsuits against Whitney that would fare no better than the first.

== Parents' deaths ==
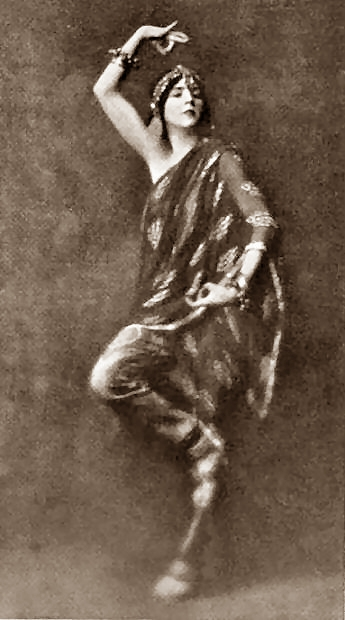
The Book of the Dance, 1920

On January 21, 1928, Fontaine’s mother was killed near New Smyrna Beach, Florida, when her automobile collided with a Florida East Coast Railway passenger train. Florence Fontaine had been on her way to Miami to care for her daughter who had fallen ill. Fontaine's father died on August 19, 1939, while on a visit to her home in Margate, New Jersey. At the time Winston Fontaine was a member of the Dallas office of the Loyalty Group Insurance Company.

== Second marriage ==
Fontaine married former Olympic swimmer Harold “Stubby” Kruger in 1928 or 1929. Bobby, her second son, would be born to this union before their divorce in 1935. Curiously, upon returning from Europe in October 1930, she was listed on the passenger manifest of the SS Leviathan as Evan Burrows Fontaine Friedman along with a Walter Friedman of New York City. Kruger was a colleague of Johnny Weissmuller and performed at carnivals and fairs billed as the Incomparable Water Comedian. He also had a career in Hollywood as an actor and stunt double that began in the silent era and lasted well into the 1950s. His last film credit was as Spencer Tracy’s double in The Old Man and the Sea. Harold Herman Kruger was born on September 23, 1898, at Honolulu, Hawaii, and died in Los Angeles, California, on October 7, 1965. In 1986 Kruger was inducted into the International Swimming Hall of Fame at Fort Lauderdale, Florida.

== Later life ==
Sometime in the late 1930s Fontaine became a co-owner of the Walton Roof, a Philadelphia night spot atop the Walton Hotel, along with her husband (or soon-to-be husband), restaurateur Jack Lynch. Her first son, Neil “Sonny” Winston Fontaine, whose father was Cornelius "Sonny" Vanderbilt Whitney, debuted there as a bandleader in 1939, and later served at times as master of ceremonies before the club’s demise in 1946. Jack Lynch was a longtime owner of clubs and restaurants in the Philadelphia area before his death in 1957.

Fontaine spent her final years as a resident of Paris, a small rural town in northern Virginia. She died on December 27, 1984, aged 86, at the Winchester Medical Center in Winchester, Virginia.

== See also ==
- List of dancers
