= Harold Kruger =

American swimmer, actor and stuntman

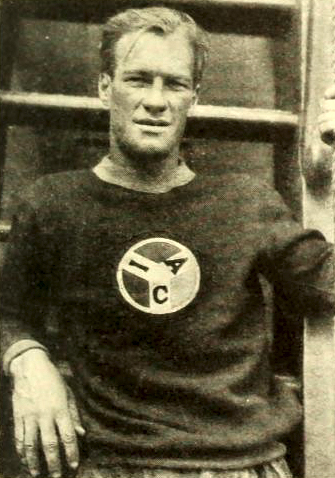

Personal information
- Full name: Harold Herman Kruger
- Nickname: "Stubby"
- National team: United States
- Born: September 21, 1897 Honolulu, Hawaii, US
- Died: October 7, 1965 (aged 68) Burbank, California, US
- Height: 5 ft 10 in (1.78 m)

Sport
- Sport: Swimming
- Strokes: Backstroke
- Club: Healani Club

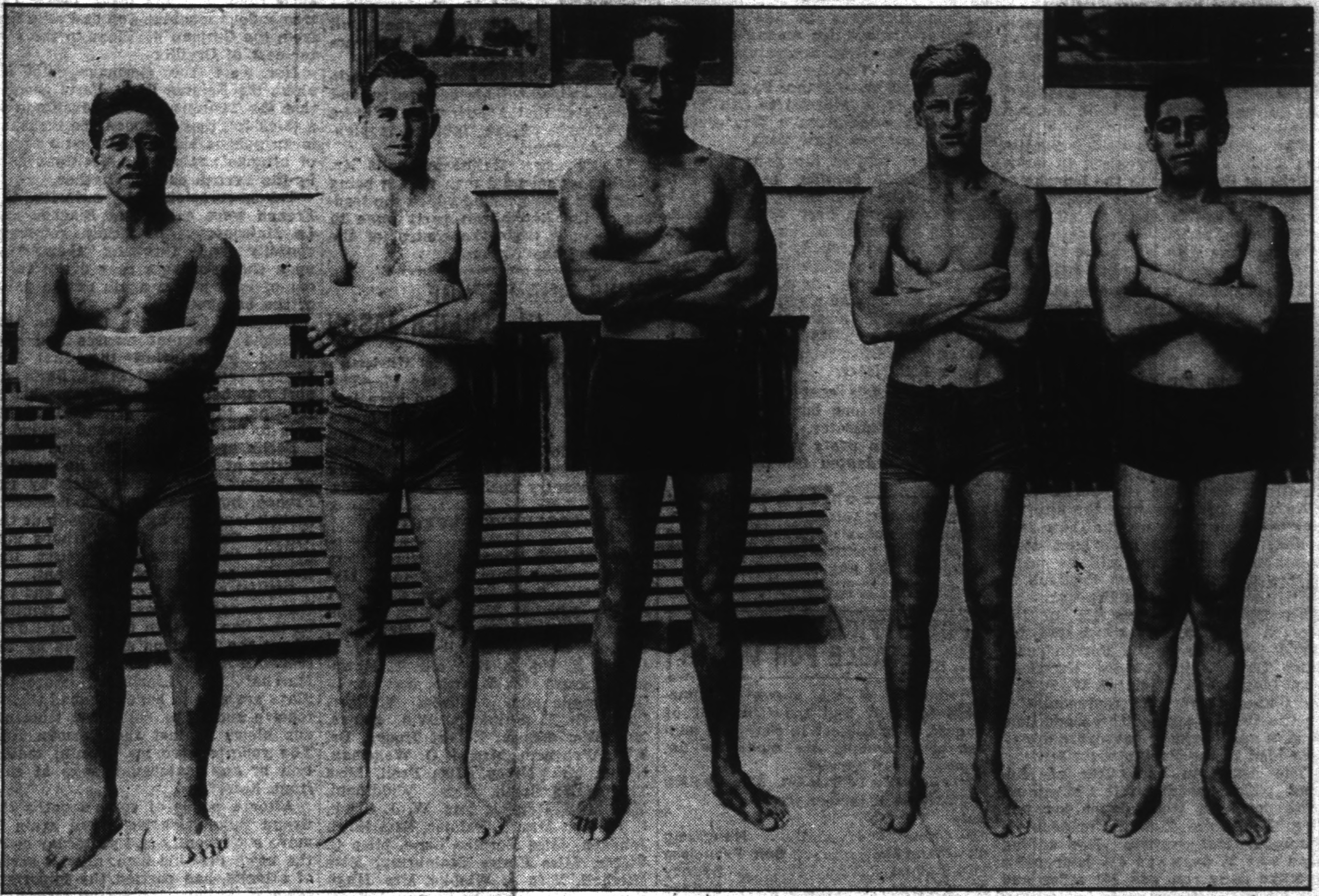

Harold Herman "Stubby" Kruger (September 21, 1897 – October 7, 1965) was an American competition swimmer who represented the United States at the 1920 Summer Olympics in Antwerp, Belgium. Kruger swam in the event final of the men's 100-meter backstroke and finished fifth overall.

Kruger married dancer and actress Evan-Burrows Fontaine in 1928 or 29. A son Bobby was born to this union before their divorce in 1935. Kruger was a colleague of Johnny Weissmuller's and performed at carnivals and fairs billed as the Incomparable Water Comedian. He also had a career in Hollywood as an actor and stunt double that began in the silent era and lasted well into the 1950s. His last film credit was as Spencer Tracy's double in The Old Man and the Sea. In 1986, Kruger was inducted into the International Swimming Hall of Fame as a "pioneer swimmer."

Sometime after his divorce, he married Annie Young. They are buried together at Diamond Head Memorial Park in Honolulu, Hawaii.

== Filmography ==
Year	Title	Role	Notes
1927	The Beloved Rogue	Minor Role	Uncredited
1932	Down to Earth	Swimmer	Uncredited
1935	Mutiny on the Bounty	Able-Bodied Seaman	Uncredited
1936	Under Two Flags	Soldier of the 17th Company	Uncredited
1937	Captains Courageous	Crewman	Uncredited
1942	Duke of the Navy	Cookie	
1942	Broadway Big Shot	Dynamite	
1942	Reap the Wild Wind	Pat	Uncredited
1942	The Talk of the Town	Baseball Player	Uncredited
1943	The Masked Marvel	J.D. Stone	Serial, Uncredited
1944	Atlantic City	Lifeguard	Uncredited
1945	They Were Expendable	Boat Crewman	Uncredited
1946	Till the End of Time	Lifeguard	Uncredited
1946	Gentleman Joe Palooka	Fighter	Uncredited
1950	The Flame and the Arrow	Guard	Uncredited
1952	Blackbeard the Pirate	Pirate	Uncredited
1953	Devil's Canyon	Prisoner	Uncredited
1955	Mister Roberts	Schlemmer	
1960	Spartacus	Pirate	Uncredited

== See also ==
- List of members of the International Swimming Hall of Fame
