= Foreign sales agent =

A foreign sales agent is a person or entity acting as a foreign representative for a domestic company.
