= William Halligan (actor) =

American actor and writer (1883–1957)

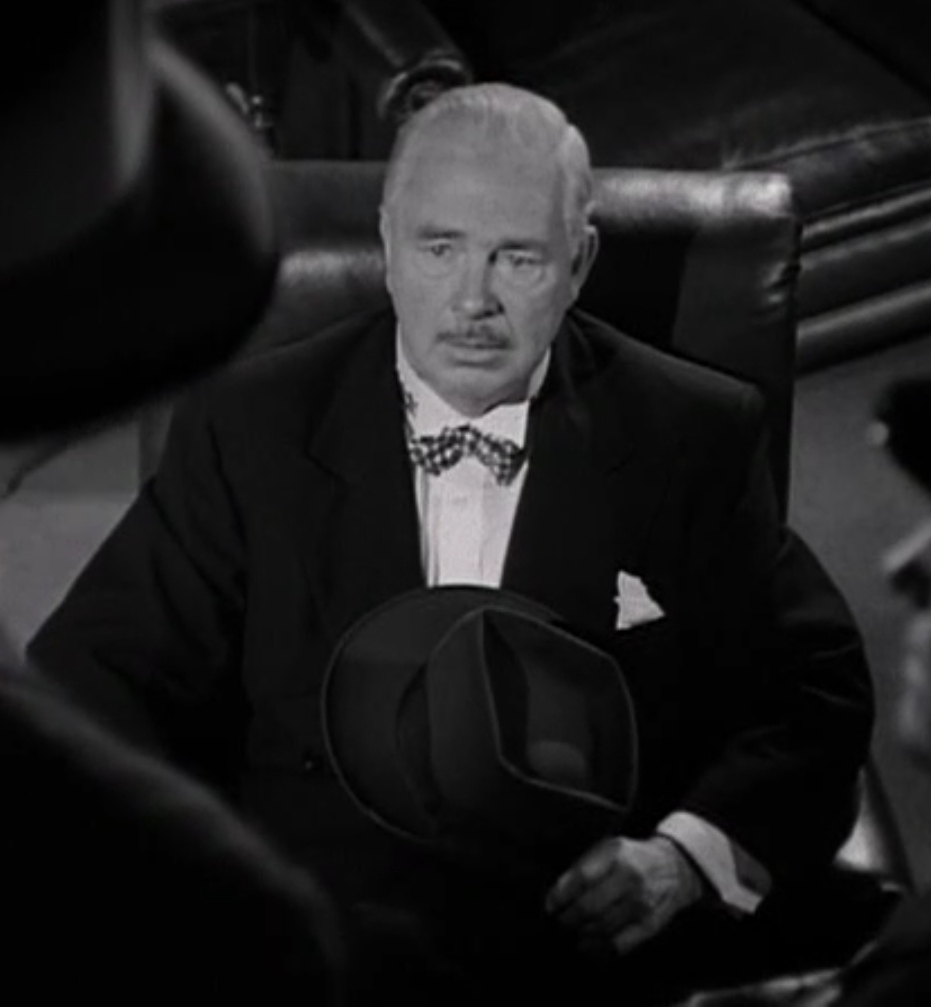
- Halligan in Dick Tracy (1945)
- Born: William Kerry Halligan; March 29, 1883; Chicago, Illinois, U.S.
- Died: January 28, 1957 (aged 73); Woodland Hills, California, U.S.
- Other name: Bill Halligan
- Occupations: Actor; writer
- Years active: 1904–1946

William Kerry Halligan (March 29, 1883 – January 28, 1957) was an American stage and film actor, and writer.

Halligan was born on March 29, 1883, in Chicago, Illinois. He was active on the stage from 1904 to 1919. That year he made his film debut in The Wonder Man. He appeared as a supporting actor in numerous films; his last appearance was in If I'm Lucky in 1946. He also worked as a writer and "gagman" (joke writer) from 1928 to 1943. He died at the Motion Picture County House in Woodland Hills, California on January 28, 1957.

Halligan's Broadway credits included Watch Your Step (1914), in which he portrayed Silas Flint, and Rufus LeMaire's Affairs (1927), which he directed and in which he appeared in four roles.

== Filmography ==
Partial list of films featuring William Halligan:

- The Wonder Man (1920) - Bubbles
- Waltzing Around (short) (1929)
- Somewhere in Jersey (Vitaphone Varieties) (1929)
- Follow the Leader (1930) - Bob Sterling
- At Your Service (Vitaphone Varieties) (1930)
- The Darling Brute (Vitaphone Varieties) (1930)
- Accidents will Happen (short) (1930)
- Lady and Gent (1932) - Doc Hayes
- Story Conference (Broadway Brevities) (1934)
- Earl of Puddlestone (1940) - Henry Potter-Potter
- You Can't Fool Your Wife (1940) - J.R. Gillespie Sr.
- Emergency Landing (1941) - George B. Lambert
- Murder Among Friends (1941) - James Gerald
- Double Cross (1941) - Mayor
- Paper Bullets (1941) - Police Chief Flynn
- Blonde Comet (1941) - Cannonball Blake
- Foreign Agent (1942) - Bob Davis
- Broadway Big Shot (1942) - Warden Collins
- A Gentleman at Heart (1942) - Higgins
- Henry Aldrich, Editor (1942) - Norman Kenly
- Riders of the Deadline (1943) - banker Simon Crandall
- Jive Junction (1943) - Mr. Maglodian
- He's My Guy (1943) - Elwood
- The Black Hills Express (1943) - Marshal Harvey Dorman
- The Seventh Victim (1943) - Paul Radeaux (uncredited)
- The Great Mike (1944) - Doc Scott
- Dick Tracy (1945) - Mayor
- Within These Walls (1945) - Collins
- Till the Clouds Roll By (1946) - Cap'n Andy

== Anecdotes ==
Halligan enjoyed gambling, but unfortunately was noted for his inability to pick horses. One day at Santa Anita his friend, Nick the Greek, challenged him: "Bill, you're such a bad handicapper I'll bet you 100 to 1 that you can't pick a horse that will finish last." Halligan took the bet at $1000 to $10, and picked Paper Boy, an extreme longshot. Paper Boy won, and paid $64.

On another occasion Nick told Halligan: "In gambling with a Southerner, never be afraid [if] he pulls a pistol on you. It's when he pulls his fountain pen that you'd better duck."
