= She Done Him Right (1940 film) =

1940 film by William Beaudine

- Directed by: William Beaudine
- Produced by: Jed Buell; James K. Friedrich; Ted Toddy
- Release date: 1940
- Country: United States
- Language: English

She Done Him Right is a 1940 American comedy film directed by William Beaudine. It was released by Dixie National Pictures Inc..
