= Boy of Mine =

1923 film by William Beaudine

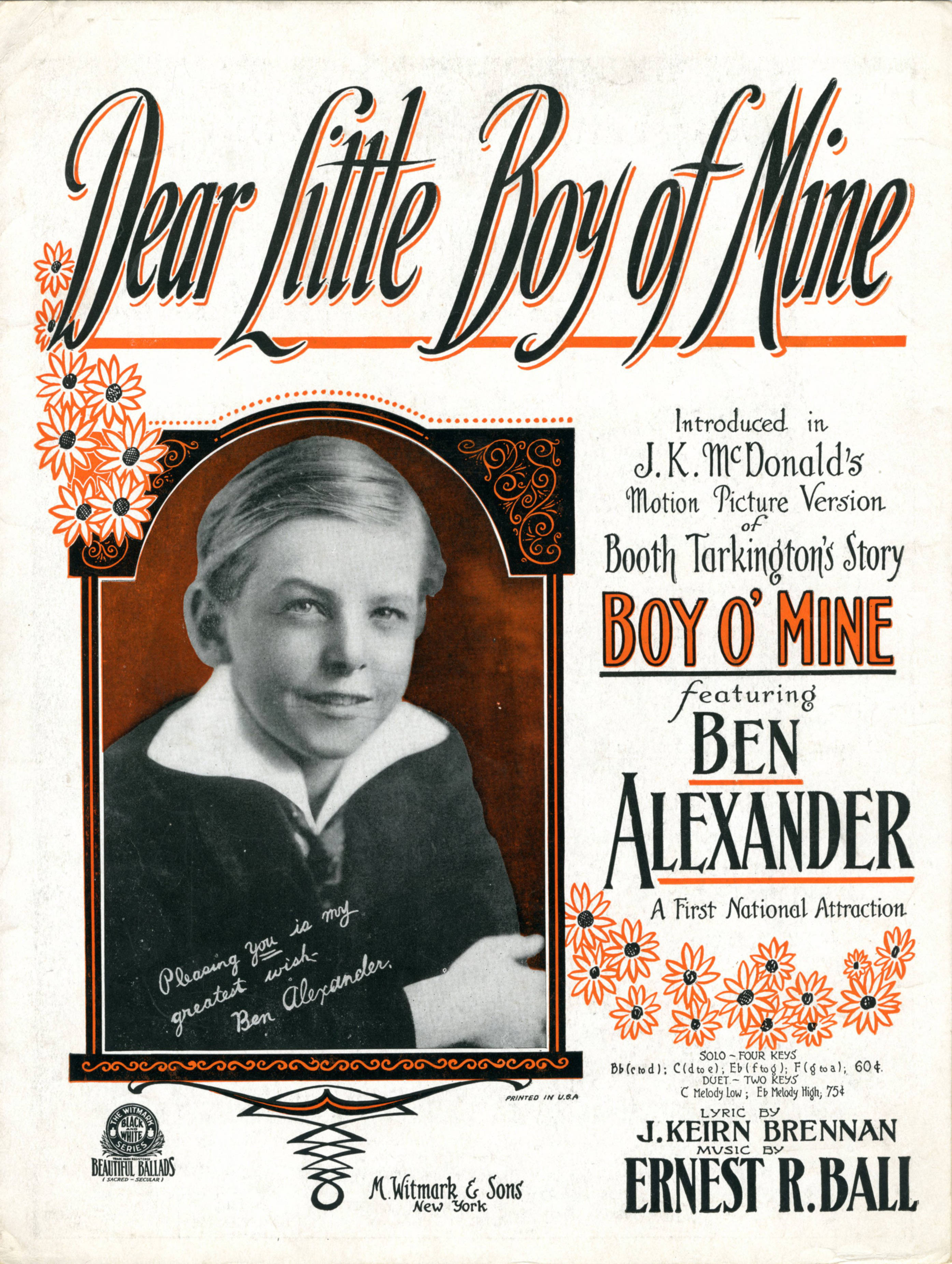
- Film still with Ben Alexander on sheet music cover
- Directed by: William Beaudine
- Written by: Louis D. Lighton (screenplay), Hope Loring
- Based on: "Misunderstood" by Booth Tarkington
- Cinematography: Ray June, William Rees, George Richter
- Edited by: Robert De Lacey
- Production company: J.K. McDonald Productions
- Distributed by: Associated First National Pictures
- Release date: December 30, 1923
- Country: United States
- Language: Silent (English intertitles)

Boy of Mine is a 1923 American silent family drama film directed by William Beaudine that was based upon a short story by Booth Tarkington. It stars Ben Alexander, Rockliffe Fellowes, and Henry B. Walthall. Wendy L. Marshall stated that "Beaudine had the Midas touch when it came to directing children" in films such as this and Penrod and Sam.

== Plot ==
As described in a film magazine review, young Bill Latimer is wrecking his father's nerves with his boyish pranks. The father does not rightly understand the lad, and, when he punishes him for his unwitting disobedience, Bill runs away. He is brought back home by Dr. Robert Mason, who saves Bill from some kidnappers. Bill's mother leaves the home with her son. This separation makes the father realizes his mistakes, leading to a resolution for the whole family.

== Cast ==
- Ben Alexander as Bill Latimer
- Rockliffe Fellowes as Dr. Robert Mason
- Henry B. Walthall as William Latimer
- Irene Rich as Ruth Latimer
- Dot Farley as Mrs. Pettis
- Lawrence Licalzi as Junior Pettis
- Eugene Jackson as Little Boy (uncredited)
- Jack Kenny as Minor Role (uncredited)

== Preservation ==
Boy of Mine is currently presumed lost. In February of 2021, the film was cited by the National Film Preservation Board on their Lost U.S. Silent Feature Films list.
