= Foreign Agent =

1942 film by William Beaudine

- Directed by: William Beaudine
- Written by: John W. Krafft; Martin Mooney
- Produced by: Max King; Martin Mooney
- Starring: John Shelton; Gale Storm; Ivan Lebedeff
- Cinematography: Mack Stengler
- Edited by: Frederick Bain
- Production company: Monogram Pictures
- Distributed by: Monogram Pictures
- Release date: October 9, 1942
- Running time: 62 minutes
- Country: United States
- Language: English

Foreign Agent is a 1942 American spy film directed by William Beaudine. It stars John Shelton, Gale Storm, and Ivan Lebedeff.

== Plot ==
A young woman in Hollywood foils the attempts of Axis spies to steal an invention.

== Cast ==
- John Shelton as Jimmy
- Gale Storm as Mitzi Mayo
- Ivan Lebedeff as Okura
- George Travell as Nick Dancy
- Patsy Moran as Joan Collins
- Lyle Latell as Eddie McGurk
- Hans Schumm as Dr. Werner
- William Halligan as Bob Davis
- Kenneth Harlan as George McCall
- Herbert Rawlinson as Stevens
- Boyd Irwin as Elliott Jennings
- David Clarke as Carl Beck
- Fee Malten as Anna
- Edward Peil Sr. as Robert Nelson
- Paul Bryar as Jerry the bartender
