= Larry Grey =

English magician

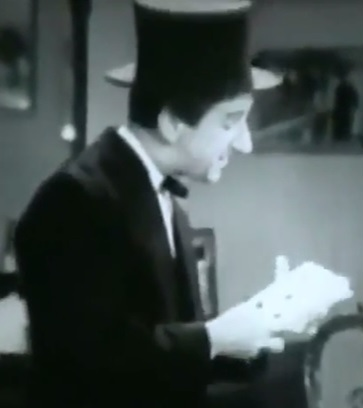
- Larry Grey performing with Jumbo cards in Mr. Celebrity (1941)
- Born: Lawrence Gray; 23 March 1895; Leeds, West Riding of Yorkshire, England
- Died: 5 May 1951 (aged 56); Oakland, California, U.S.
- Other names: Larry Gray; The Dizzy Wizard; Cardo the Great
- Occupations: Magician, actor
- Years active: 1918–1951
- Spouse: Carlotta Dale Garrison (m. 1940)

Lawrence Grey (23 March 1895 – 5 May 1951) was an English magician known for his card tricks. He also worked as an occasional actor and is known for voicing Bill the Lizard in Walt Disney's Alice in Wonderland.

== Biography ==
Larry Grey was born on March 23, 1895, in Leeds, West Riding of Yorkshire, England. In his youth, he emigrated to the United States, where he began practising magic. One of his earliest tricks included Jumbo Cards, which inspired many of his later card tricks.

Around 1918, Grey met Dai Vernon on Coney Island. At the time, Grey had just begun his career in magic but with little success and was only just managing to make a living. Grey and Vernon decided to work together, initially setting up a booth along Kengsington Walk, in which Grey would sell small packs of cards and magic props while Vernon would cut silhouettes. During this time, Vernon and Grey lived together in a room on Coney Island. Vernon later taught him how to cut silhouettes, and they both worked together cutting silhouettes at the Toronto Exhibition in 1919 and at a booth in New York City in the 1920s. In 1926, Grey and Vernon set up the Sleight-of-Hand Artists Club, their meetings were held in their Silhouette Studio on Broadway.

After meeting Vernon, Grey began to develop his performance style. His routines were often comedic and fast-paced. He was best known under his stage name, "The Dizzy Wizard", due to his zany personality. He eventually earned moderate success among magicians and was particularly noted for his card and sleight of hand magic. In 1940, he married Carlotta Dale Garrison, who performed alongside her husband as a singer.

In 1941, Grey appeared in the film, Mr. Celebrity, as himself performing magic tricks with Jumbo Cards. The film was about vaudeville performers performing in a boarding house. He also appeared in a few other films during his lifetime.

Near the end of his life, Grey had his own magic theater. on the boardwalk at Santa Cruz, California, and did a comedy magic act with his wife. He also made his most famous film appearance in Walt Disney’s Alice in Wonderland in 1951 as the voice of Bill the Lizard. He died the same year.

== Death and legacy ==
On May 5, 1951, three hours before he was due to perform a magic show in San Francisco, and shortly after appearing in Alice in Wonderland, Grey died, aged 56, after shooting himself in the head with a .38 caliber revolver three doors down from his home in Oakland, California. He left a series of suicide notes found in a suitcase near his body which explained that he "couldn't go on any longer". According to his wife Carlotta, Grey had been depressed because his career had declined and he felt "washed up" in show business.

His death was greatly mourned, especially by his good friend Dai Vernon, who said he was, "One of the greatest card performers who ever lived". Grey is mentioned frequently in columns written for the Genii magazine by Vernon.

== Filmography ==
- Mr. Celebrity (1941) - Larry 'Cardo the Great' Grey
- Alice in Wonderland (1951) - Bill The Lizard (voice) (Released posthumously; final role)
