= The Clay Pigeon =

1949 film by Richard Fleischer

- Theatrical release lobby card
- Directed by: Richard Fleischer
- Written by: Carl Foreman
- Produced by: Herman Schlom
- Starring: Bill Williams; Barbara Hale; Richard Quine; Richard Loo; Frank Fenton; Marya Marco
- Cinematography: Robert De Grasse
- Edited by: Samuel E. Beetley
- Music by: Paul Sawtell
- Distributed by: RKO Radio Pictures
- Release date: February 14, 1949
- Running time: 63 minutes
- Country: United States
- Language: English

The Clay Pigeon is a 1949 American film noir directed by Richard Fleischer and written by Carl Foreman, based on a true story. The drama features Bill Williams and Barbara Hale, a real-life husband and wife.

== Plot ==
Jim Fletcher, a former inmate in a Japanese prisoner-of-war camp, awakes from a coma at a Naval hospital, and is then informed that he has been accused of murder. As Fletcher is uncertain of his guilt, he escapes from the hospital to search for his best friend Mark Gregory, another ex-POW.

== Cast ==
- Bill Williams as Jim Fletcher
- Barbara Hale as Martha Gregory
- Richard Quine as Ted Niles
- Richard Loo as Ken Tokoyama/The Weasel
- Frank Fenton as Lt. Cmdr. Prentice
- Frank Wilcox as Navy Hospital Doctor
- Marya Marco as Helen Minoto
- Robert Bray as Gunsel Blake
- Martha Hyer as Miss Harwick
- Harold Landon as Blind Veteran
- James Craven as John Wheeler

== Depiction of Japanese Americans ==
Although the movie shows Jim Fletcher (Bill Williams)'s Japanese captors as extremely sadistic and inhumane, it also casts the much-maligned Japanese Americans in a positive light. As Japanese American Helen Minoto (Marya Marco) helps Jim escape his pursuers, he sees a photograph of her deceased husband, Sergeant John Minoto, member of the 442d Regimental Combat Team of the U.S. Army. It is accompanied by the certificate for his Distinguished Service Cross, awarded for "Extraordinary Heroism".

Film noir specialist Eddie Muller speculates this is the first time the highly decorated 442nd Regimental Combat Team, composed mostly of Japanese Americans, was acknowledged in a movie, and states that this was not simply the studio's formulaic trope of balancing something negative with a positive, but rather screenwriter Carl Foreman's personal progressive outlook.

== Reception ==
=== Critical response ===
Time Out film reviews wrote of the film, "Directed by Fleischer with tight, spare energy, although the implausible script and bland leading performances (with Hale as the dead friend's wife, initially hostile but soon losing her heart) make it much inferior to The Narrow Margin.
