= Champion (1949 film) =

1949 American sports drama film

- Theatrical release poster
- Directed by: Mark Robson
- Screenplay by: Carl Foreman
- Based on: "Champion"; 1916 story in Metropolitan Magazine by Ring Lardner
- Produced by: Stanley Kramer
- Starring: Kirk Douglas; Marilyn Maxwell; Arthur Kennedy
- Cinematography: Franz Planer
- Edited by: Harry W. Gerstad
- Music by: Dimitri Tiomkin
- Production companies: Screen Plays; Stanley Kramer Productions
- Distributed by: United Artists
- Release date: May 20, 1949
- Running time: 99 minutes
- Country: United States
- Language: English
- Budget: $570,000 or $500,000 or $595,000
- Box office: $2.5 million or $2.1 million

Champion is a 1949 American sports drama film noir directed by Mark Robson with a screenplay written by Carl Foreman based on a short story by Ring Lardner. The film stars Kirk Douglas, Marilyn Maxwell, Arthur Kennedy, Paul Stewart, Ruth Roman and Lola Albright. The story recounts the struggles of boxer "Midge" Kelly fighting his own demons while working to achieve success in the ring.

The film won an Academy Award for Best Film Editing and gained five other nominations as well, including a Best Actor for Douglas and Best Supporting Actor for Kennedy.

Several clips from the film were used in Douglas' 1999 film Diamonds to illustrate his character's career as a boxer.

== Plot ==
Michael "Midge" Kelly is a boxer who pushes himself to the top of his game by felling opponents, backstabbing his friends and manipulating women. He double-crosses Tommy Haley, the manager who found him and helped pave his road to fame.

Midge and his brother Connie are hitchhiking and jumping freight cars from Chicago to California, where they have bought a share in a restaurant. Along the way, they hitch a lift from a car carrying top boxer Johnny Dunne and his girlfriend Grace Diamond. They are driven to Kansas City, where Dunne is fighting another contender that night.

Midge needs money and is offered a fight on the undercard for $35. After Midge takes a beating, the promoter only pays him $10, claiming the remainder as management fees. The fight brings Midge to the attention of trainer Tommy Haley, who tells an uninterested Midge to visit his gym in Los Angeles if he ever needs a break.

Once they reach Los Angeles, Midge and Connie discover they have been conned in the restaurant deal. The brothers need to secure jobs waiting tables and washing dishes. Both begin a relationship with the owner's daughter Emma. When Midge is discovered with her, they are forced to marry by her outraged father. After the shotgun wedding, Midge abandons his new wife and flees with his brother to Haley's gym.

Midge enters his new boxing career with a single-minded devotion. He defeats a number of local fighters, begins touring the country and is soon ranked as a contender. He is matched with Dunne, who is in line for a championship fight. Organized crime figures pressure Midge to throw the match, guaranteeing him a legitimate shot at the title the following year if he complies. Midge agrees but then defeats Dunne in a single round.

Grace attaches herself to Midge and persuades him to abandon Haley and become managed by Jerome Harris, a wealthy and influential figure in the fight game with criminal ties. Realizing that this is only shot at the title, Midge agrees, to Connie's disgust. Connie reconnects with Emma and convinces her to accompany him back to Chicago to take care for his ailing mother.

Midge takes the title and becomes a popular fan favorite because of his rise from humble beginnings. He becomes involved with Palmer Harris, a sculptor and the wife of his new manager. She falls in love with him and persuades Midge to ask her husband for a divorce. Jerome refuses and instead offers Midge a large sum of money if he ends the relationship. Midge agrees, leaving Palmer brokenhearted.

After fighting several second-rate challengers, Midge agrees to fight Dunne, who is making a comeback. Midge realizes that he needs to train in order to win, so he rehires Haley as his manager, and Connie and Emma return to his camp. Connie and Emma are now contemplating marriage, although Emma is still legally married to Midge.

Midge fights Dunne in a highly anticipated match. Midge knocks Dunne to the mat in the first round, but Dunne recovers and begins to take command, pounding Midge and pummeling his face. Haley tries to end the match, but Midge refuses and continues fighting, taking more vicious blows. After seeing Grace in the audience, Midge, now enraged, rallies in the final round and defeats Dunne, but he is seriously injured and dies in his locker room of a cerebral hemorrhage.

After delivering a eulogy to a reporter, Connie and Emma walk away into the darkness, now free to continue their lives.

== Cast ==
- Kirk Douglas as Midge Kelly
- Marilyn Maxwell as Grace
- Arthur Kennedy as Connie
- Paul Stewart as Haley
- Ruth Roman as Emma
- Lola Albright as Palmer
- Luis van Rooten as Harris
- Harry Shannon as Lew
- John Day as Johnny Dunne
- Ralph Sanford as Hammond
- Esther Howard as Mrs. Kelly

== Production ==
Director Mark Robson said that producer Stanley Kramer had been impressed by Robson's work on Val Lewton's films and offered him So This Is New York, but Robson declined. However, Robson liked the Champion script and agreed to direct the film.

The film was shot in 20 days and cost approximately $500,000.

RKO Pictures was permitted to view Champion before its release and noticed troubling similarities between the film and its upcoming film The Set-Up (1949). RKO asked Kramer to reshoot the scene in which Midge fights honestly instead of throwing the match, but he denied any similarities and refused to alter Champion. RKO alleged that Robson had access to material from The Set-Up because he was working as a director for the studio when the film was produced, although he did not work on the film itself. In response, in March 1949, RKO rushed The Set-Up for release and sued the filmmakers of Champion in federal court for $500,000 in damages and petitioned for an injunction to halt the release of Champion. In early May, a judge recommended that specific scenes be removed and that the resulting film should then be reviewed by the court to confirm that Champion was not significantly weakened by the deleted sequences. Later in the month, RKO and United Artists settled out of court when United Artists agreed to remove 101 feet of film from Champion (approximately 1% of its total length) and two additional words of dialogue.

RKO and United Artists had been involved in a similar dispute the previous year regarding RKO's The Outlaw (1943) and United Artists' Red River (1948). The case was resolved when United Artists agreed to remove a scene from Red River.

The success of the film created opportunities for several of its contributors: Kirk Douglas signed a seven-year, million-dollar contract with Warner Bros., Robson was signed by Samuel Goldwyn, writer Carl Foreman was in demand and Lola Albright and Ruth Roman were signed to studio contracts.

== Reception ==
=== Box office ===
The film opened at the Globe Theatre in New York City on April 9, 1949 and grossed $41,000 in its opening week.

=== Critical response ===
In a contemporary review for The New York Times, critic Bosley Crowther wrote:

[W]e should be grateful that the makers of the film have sweetened the character just a little from the way he was in the tale, for Mr. Lardner's Midge Kelly was as cruel and contemptible as they come. Looking at him in a movie would be a chore of extreme distaste. But here the redeeming virtues which Carl Foreman, the scriptwriter, has thrown in make the fellow endurable, if not altogether plausible. ... However, Director Mark Robson has covered up story weaknesses with a wealth of pictorial interests and exciting action of a graphic, colorful sort. His scenes in training gymnasiums, managers' offices and, of course, the big fight rings are strongly atmospheric and physically intense. Except that the fighting is more furious than one can credit, it is virtually all right. ... If one hasn't already seen the recently memorable "Body and Soul," which might have served as a model for "Champion," this is a stinging fight film to see. If one has seen that other, this will look a little pale.

Variety magazine wrote: "Adapted from a Ring Lardner short story of the same title, Champion is a stark, realistic study of the boxing rackets and the degeneracy of a prizefighter. Fight scenes, under Franz Planer's camera, have realism and impact. Unrelenting pace is set by the opening sequence. Cast, under Mark Robson's tight direction, is fine. Kirk Douglas is the boxer and he makes the character live. Second honors go jointly to Arthur Kennedy, the fighter's crippled brother, and Paul Stewart as the knowing manager."

The review aggregator Rotten Tomatoes reports that 94% of critics have given the film a positive review, based on 16 reviews.

=== Accolades ===
Wins

- Academy Award for Film Editing — Harry W. Gerstad
- Golden Globe Award for Best Cinematography — Franz Planer

Nominations

- Directors Guild of America Award for Outstanding Directorial Achievement in Motion Pictures — Mark Robson
- Academy Award for Best Actor — Kirk Douglas
- Academy Award for Best Supporting Actor — Arthur Kennedy
- Golden Globe Award for Most Promising Newcomer – Female — Ruth Roman
- Academy Award for Best Cinematography, Black-and-White — Franz Planer
- Academy Award for Original Music Score — Dimitri Tiomkin
- Academy Award for Writing Adapted Screenplay — Carl Foreman
- WGA for Best Written American Drama — Carl Foreman

Others

The film is recognized by American Film Institute in these lists:

- 2001: AFI's 100 Years...100 Thrills — Nominated
- 2005: AFI's 100 Years...100 Movie Quotes — Nominated
  - Michael Kelly: "For the first time in my life, people cheering for me. Were you deaf? Didn't you hear 'em? We're not hitchhiking any more. We're riding."

== Radio adaptation ==
Champion was presented on Screen Directors Playhouse on the NBC Radio Network on March 17, 1950, with Douglas reprising his role from the film.

== See also ==
- List of boxing films
