= Jonathan Foreman =

Jonathan Foreman may refer to:

- Jonathan Foreman (journalist) (born 1965), Anglo-American journalist and film critic
- Jon Foreman (born 1976), singer, guitarist and songwriter of Switchfoot
