= Spooks Run Wild =

1941 film by Phil Rosen

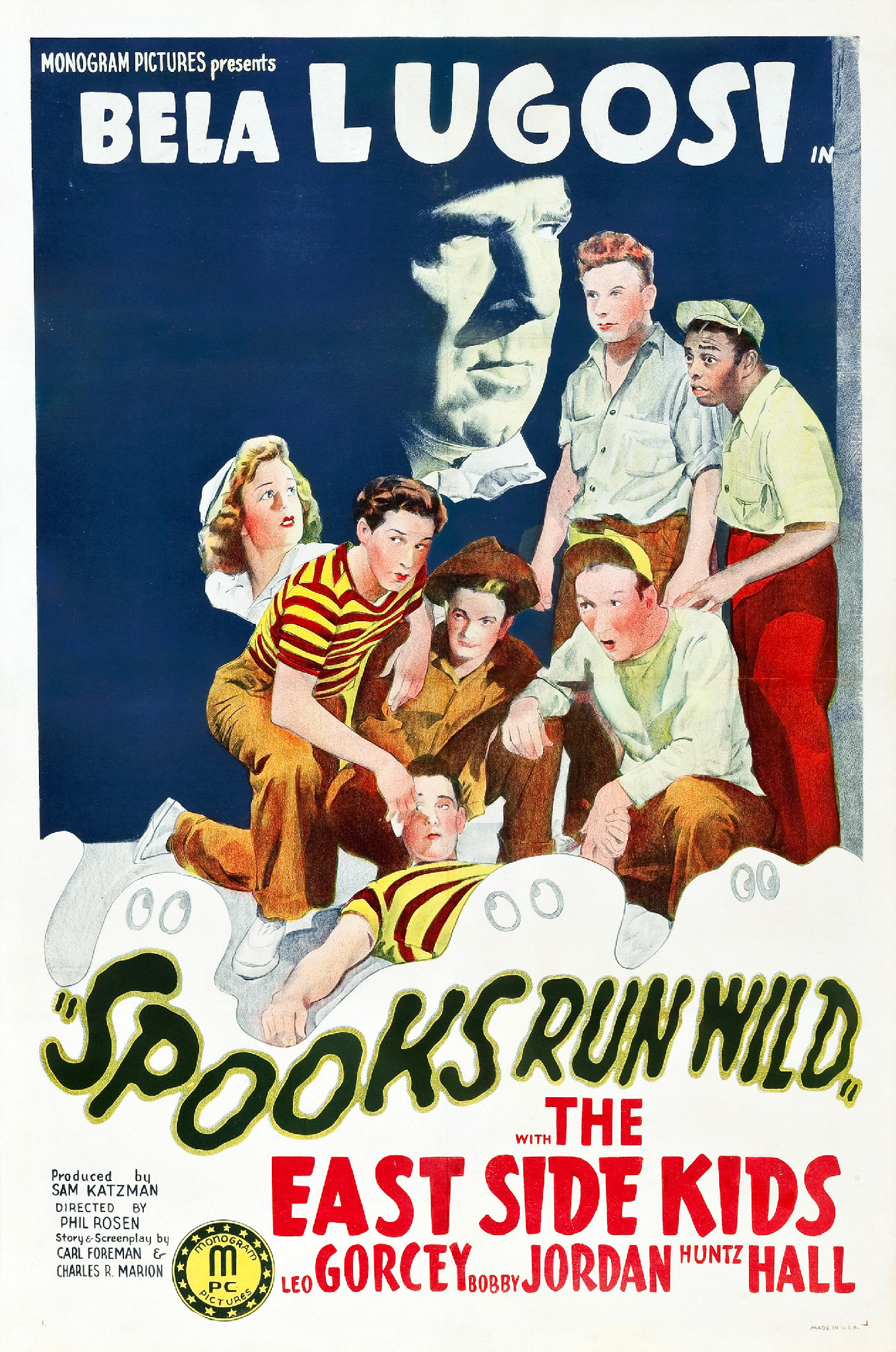
- Theatrical poster
- Directed by: Phil Rosen
- Written by: Carl Foreman; Charles R. Marion (original story and screenplay)
- Produced by: Sam Katzman
- Starring: Bela Lugosi; Leo Gorcey; Bobby Jordan; Huntz Hall
- Cinematography: Marcel Le Picard, A.S.C.
- Edited by: Robert Golden
- Music by: Lange & Porter, A.S.C.A.P.
- Production company: Banner Pictures Corp.
- Distributed by: Monogram Pictures Corporation
- Release date: October 24, 1941
- Running time: 65 minutes

Spooks Run Wild is a 1941 American horror comedy film and the seventh film in the East Side Kids series. It stars Bela Lugosi with Leo Gorcey, Bobby Jordan and Huntz Hall. It is directed by Phil Rosen, in his first and only outing in the series, and produced by Sam Katzman (under the company name Banner Pictures). The original script is by Carl Foreman and Charles R. Marion.

In the film, the members of a club are vacationing in a summer camp. The area is reputed to have its own "monster killer", and suspicions fall on a strange man who has taken residence in a long-abandoned house.

The film was intended to combine the most popular stars of Monogram Pictures, Lugosi and the East Side Kids. The film was released shortly before Halloween. The film marked the last film appearance of Donald Haines, who died in the Battle of Kasserine Pass (1943).

The full film

== Plot ==
Members of the New York City East Side boys club—leader Muggs, Danny, Glimpy, Scruno, Skinny, and Peewee—reluctantly board a bus bound for summer camp.

The bus stops in the town of Hillside, where Muggs and his pals flirt with Margie, a soda fountain waitress. While they are there, a radio broadcast announces that a maniacal "monster killer" is in the area. When they arrive at the camp, the counselor, Jeff Dixon, complains to his girlfriend, camp nurse Linda Mason, that he will get no work done on his thesis because of the rowdy juvenile delinquents.

One night, Nardo, a mysterious caped figure, and his dwarf assistant, Luigi, ask a local gas station attendant for directions to the hilltop Billings house, which has been deserted for years since its owner was murdered. After he leaves, another car arrives and the attendant recognizes the driver from his mystery magazines as Dr. Von Grosch. The attendant believes that Nardo is the killer and Von Grosch is hunting him, and he alerts the local constable that Nardo is a suspect. One night, Nardo and Luigi sneak into the local graveyard and are shot at by a grave digger.

That same night, Muggs slips out of camp hoping to rendezvous with the soda fountain girl, and is followed by all his pals. The East Side Kids get lost in the woods, and when they wander into the graveyard, Peewee is also shot by the digger. The boys take Peewee to the nearby Billings house, where Nardo tends to his minor injury and gives him a sedative. Nardo lets the boys spend the night, but Peewee disappears while sleepwalking. The rest of the boys are unable to sleep because of Nardo's strangeness and Peewee's disappearance. Linda, meanwhile, also disappears while out searching for the boys, and Jeff goes to the police for help.

When the boys confront Nardo, he claims not to know where Peewee is, but insists that the boys remain in the house. Muggs distrusts Nardo and on his command, the boys attack him and roll him into a carpet. Skinny and Glimpy disappear through a secret passage, and Scruno is spooked when Nardo reappears. At constable Jim's office, the grave digger recalls seeing the boys, and Jim believes they may have fallen into the killer's hands at the Billings estate. The boys, meanwhile, search for Peewee, but are continually being surprised by the appearance of coffins and objects that move themselves, and by the disappearance of their pals through walls and closets.

Linda, meanwhile, accepts a ride from Von Grosch, who takes her to the Billings house, ostensibly to help the boys. Muggs and the boys succeed in terrifying Nardo by pretending to be a ghost, and they finally find Peewee back in bed. Just after Linda and Von Grosch arrive at the house, Von Grosch attacks Linda.

The police burst in and accuse Nardo of being a killer, but Muggs has already learned that Nardo is merely a magician. When they all hear Linda screaming inside a locked room, Muggs climbs onto the roof and enters the room through a window. While he struggles with Von Grosch, who is the real "monster killer", Linda opens the door, and the police arrest Von Grosch. Later, Nardo performs magic tricks for Jeff, Linda and the boys, and when Muggs goes into a cabinet after a disappearing girl, he emerges with Scruno in his arms.

== Cast ==
=== The East Side Kids ===
- Leo Gorcey as Muggs
- Bobby Jordan as Danny
- Huntz Hall as Glimpy
- Sunshine Sammy Morrison as Scruno
- David Gorcey as Peewee
- Donald Haines as Skinny

=== Cast in opening credits ===
- Bela Lugosi as Nardo
- Leo Gorcey as Muggs
- Bobby Jordan as Danny
- Huntz Hall as Glimpy
- Sunshine Sammy Morrison as Scruno
- David O'Brien as Jeff Dixon
- Dorothy Short as Linda Mason
- David Gorcey as Peewee
- Donald Haines as Skinny
- Dennis Moore as Dr. Van Grosch
- P.J. Kelley as Lem Harvey
- Angelo Rossitto as Luigi
- Guy Wilkerson as Constable

== Overview ==
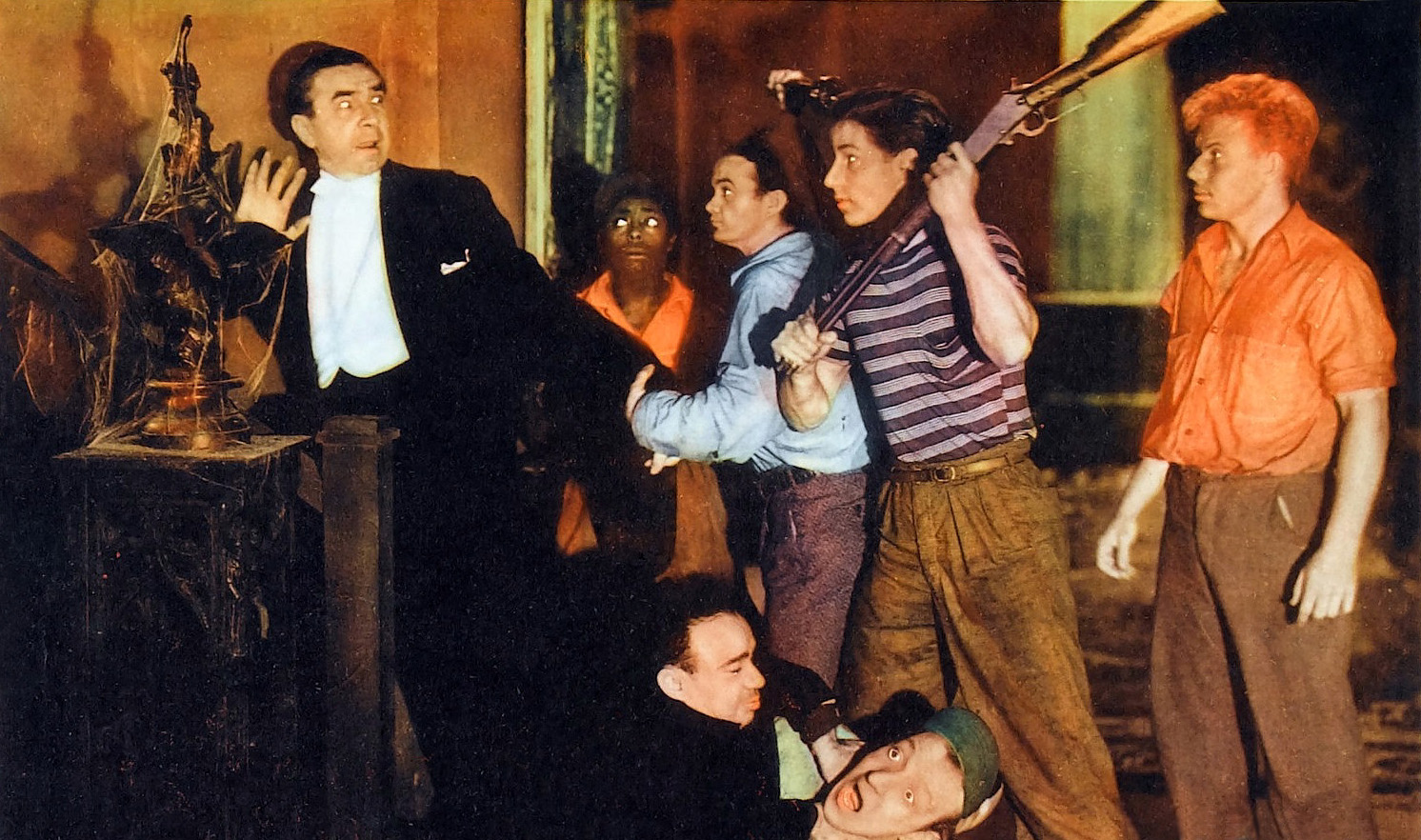
Bela Lugosi, Angelo Rossitto and the East Side Kids.

Since the series' inception in 1940, the East Side Kids films had been, for the most part, a well balanced mix between comedy, drama, and social relevance. Following Huntz Hall's introduction into the series with 1941's Bowery Blitzkrieg, which made famous the Gorcey/Hall banter, producer Sam Katzman decided that the seventh film in the series would not only be a change of pace, but, would also be one of the biggest East Side Kids extravaganzas yet.

With that in mind, Katzman enlisted the screen writing team of Carl Foreman and Charles R. Marion to write the screenplay, which would feature Monogram's two most popular draws for the first time together on screen: Bela Lugosi and the East Side Kids. Foreman was paid $25 for his original story and $200 for the script. The film was originally known as Trail of the Vampire then Ghosts in the Night.|In April 1941 Monogram announced that Lugosi would make two starring vehicles for the studio, The Night of Horror and Kiss of Death and would also appear with the East Side Kids in Ghosts in the Night.

At the last minute, with Bowery Blitzkrieg director Wallace Fox already attached to Columbia's The Lone Star Vigilantes, Katzman hired Russian-born director Phil Rosen, who had just finished filming Monogram's "The Deadly Game" to helm the production.

Angelo Rossitto was cast on the strength of his performance in Hellzapoppin'.

Ghosts in the Night began filming in early August 1941, around the same time as Bowery Blitzkrieg was making its way into theatres. By the time filming wrapped only a week and half later, the film's working title was changed to Spooks Run Wild and hit theaters on October 24, 1941, just in time for Halloween.

David O'Brien began the series as Knuckles Dolan; in this film he would play a different role. The following year he would team up with Guy Wilkerson at Producers Releasing Corporation for the Texas Rangers Western film series.

It would be East Side Kid Donald Haines' last film. Haines enlisted as an aviation cadet for the United States Army Air Forces during this period and was later killed in action in 1943.

== Reception ==
The Los Angeles Times said that "for some fans it will lack the usual spontaneity of these pictures, even though there's a fair measure of laughs." The New York Times said the script "must have been the distillate of some addled witch's brew. The sum total as represented... is less horror than horrible."

== Follow up ==
Lugosi and the East Side Kids were later reteamed in Ghosts on the Loose, which was also originally known as Ghosts in the Night.
