= National Board of Review Awards 1949 =

Annual US film awards ceremony

21st National Board of Review Awards

December 18, 1949

The 21st National Board of Review Awards were announced on December 18, 1949.

== Top Ten Films ==
1. The Bicycle Thief
2. The Quiet One
3. Intruder in the Dust
4. The Heiress
5. Devil in the Flesh
6. Quartet
7. Germany Year Zero
8. Home of the Brave
9. A Letter to Three Wives
10. The Fallen Idol

== Winners ==
- Best Film: The Bicycle Thief
- Best Actor: Ralph Richardson (The Heiress, The Fallen Idol)
- Best Director: Vittorio De Sica (The Bicycle Thief)
- Best Screenplay: Graham Greene (The Fallen Idol)
