= 1949 New York Film Critics Circle Awards =

15th New York Film Critics Circle Awards

15th New York Film Critics Circle Awards

February 5, 1950
(announced December 27, 1949)

All the King's Men

The 15th New York Film Critics Circle Awards, honored the best filmmaking of 1949.

== Winners ==
- Best Film:
  - All the King's Men
- Best Actor:
  - Broderick Crawford - All the King's Men
- Best Actress:
  - Olivia de Havilland - The Heiress
- Best Director:
  - Carol Reed - The Fallen Idol
- Best Foreign Language Film:
  - Bicycle Thieves (Ladri di biciclette) • Italy
