= Carl Foreman =

American screenwriter and film producer (1914–1984)

Carl Foreman CBE
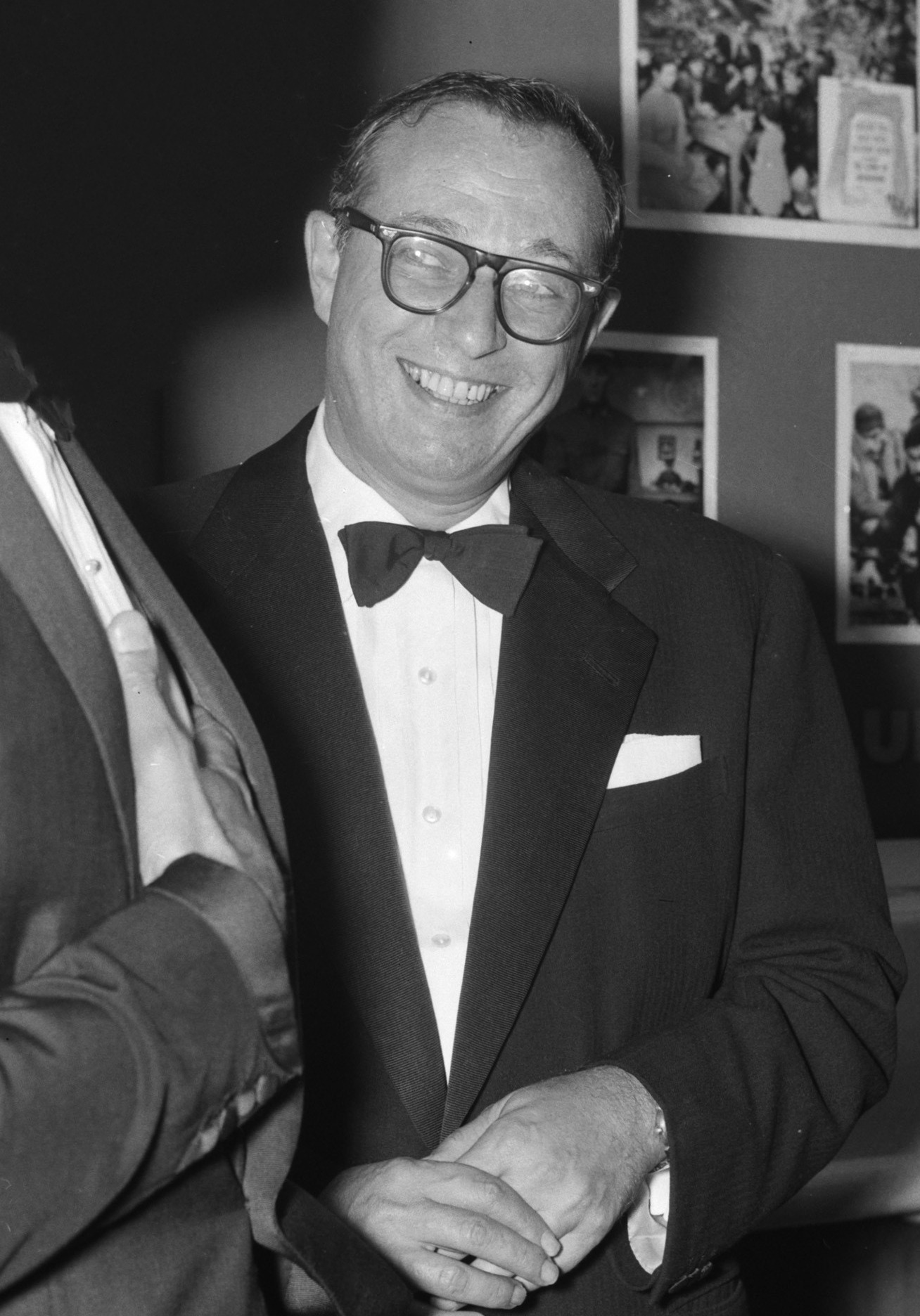
- Carl Foreman in 1961
- Born: July 23, 1914; Chicago, Illinois, U.S.
- Died: June 26, 1984 (aged 69); Beverly Hills, California, U.S.
- Other name: Derek Frye
- Occupations: Screenwriter, film producer
- Spouses: Estelle Barr; Evelyn Smith
- Children: 3, including Jonathan and Amanda

Carl Foreman CBE (July 23, 1914 – June 26, 1984) was an American screenwriter, film producer, and director. He was one of the screenwriters who were blacklisted in Hollywood in the 1950s because of their suspected communist sympathy or membership in the Communist Party, and subsequently relocated to the United Kingdom. He was nominated for six Academy Awards (five for writing and one for producing), and posthumously received Best Adapted Screenplay for his work on The Bridge on the River Kwai (1957). (Note: As Foreman was blacklisted at the time, neither he nor his co-writer Michael Wilson were credited or awarded the Oscar at the 30th Academy Awards, with credited writer Pierre Boulle receiving the award. Foreman and Wilson were recognized as the true authors in 1984.)

Foreman was also nominated for two BAFTA Awards for Best British Screenplay, and a Golden Globe Award for his work on High Noon (1952). His other notable works included Champion (1949), Home of the Brave (1949), The Men (1950), Cyrano de Bergerac (1950), The Key (1958), The Guns of Navarone (1961), Born Free (1966), Young Winston (1972), and his only directorial effort The Victors (1963).

He once said his most common theme was "the struggle of the individual against a society that for one reason or another is hostile." Foreman elaborated that "the stories that work best for me involve a loner, out of step or in direct conflict with a group of people."

== Early life and education ==
Born in Chicago, Illinois, to a working-class Jewish family, he was the son of Fanny (née Rozin) and Isidore Foreman.

He studied at the University of Illinois at Urbana–Champaign. In 1934, at age 19, he quit college to go to Hollywood. "I was mostly on the bum and saw the underside of Hollywood", he later said.

He soon returned to Chicago and attended the John J. Marshall School of Law, working at a grocery store to earn money.

Foreman dropped out of law school and worked as a newspaper reporter, fiction writer (selling stories to Esquire), press agent, play director and carnival barker. "I was one of the few college trained barkers in the business", he said.

Foreman returned to Hollywood in 1938. He worked as a story analyst for several studios and as a film laboratory technician, while continuing to write. He was a member of the Communist Party from 1938 to 1942. "The idea was just in the air", he later said.

== Career ==
=== Monogram Pictures ===
Foreman won a scholarship for a screenwriting course, where his teacher was Dore Schary. He later gave credit to Michael Blankfort for mentoring him.

Foreman's first screen credit was for producer Sam Katzman at Monogram Pictures, Bowery Blitzkrieg (1941), starring the East Side Kids.

Foreman provided the original story (for $25) and wrote a script (for $200) for the next East Side Kids film, Spooks Run Wild (1941), with Bela Lugosi. Also at Monogram he provided the story for and wrote the script of Rhythm Parade (1942). "I expected recognition but hardly anyone noticed", he said later.

=== World War II ===
Foreman's career was interrupted by service in the U.S. Army Signal Corps during World War II, where he was assigned to a unit that made orientation and training films. It was run by director Frank Capra. During his time in the service, he helped write the script for Know Your Enemy – Japan (1945). He provided the original story for a John Wayne Western, Dakota (1945). Foreman says "I began to learn the craft in a serious way", in this time.

=== Stanley Kramer ===
On his return to Hollywood, Foreman became associated with producer Stanley Kramer and George Glass. Kramer produced Foreman's next credited screenplay, So This Is New York (1948), for Enterprise Productions - it starred comedian Henry Morgan and was directed by Richard Fleischer - it was a mild success. Foreman next wrote The Clay Pigeon (1949), which Fleischer directed at RKO.

Kramer and Foreman's next film, the boxing tale Champion (1949), was a big success and made a star of actor Kirk Douglas. Foreman received an Academy Award nomination for his script. Champion was directed by Mark Robson and he, Kramer and Foreman reunited on Home of the Brave (1949), an adaptation of Arthur Laurents's play. It was another critical and commercial success.

Kramer and Foreman's next film together was The Men (1950), which introduced Marlon Brando to cinema audiences playing as a paraplegic soldier. The film was directed by Fred Zinnemann and was critically acclaimed, although not a popular success. Also acclaimed was their fourth film, Cyrano de Bergerac (1950), an adaptation of the French classic play, starring José Ferrer, who won a Best Actor Oscar. It was adapted from Brian Hooker's English translation of Edmond Rostand's play Cyrano de Bergerac.

Foreman worked on Young Man with a Horn (1950) next, without Kramer.

=== High Noon and blacklisting ===
Foreman and Kramer's next collaboration was the western film High Noon. Foreman was summoned to appear before the House Un-American Activities Committee (HUAC) during production of the film, as Congress was investigating communist activities in the United States. He testified that he had been a member of the American Communist Party more than ten years earlier while still a young man, but he had become disillusioned with the party and quit. As a result of his refusal to give the names of fellow Party members, Foreman was classified as an "uncooperative witness" and blacklisted by all of the Hollywood studio bosses.

Some critics have suggested High Noon is itself an allegory for McCarthyism. The Western film is considered an American classic and was No. 27 on the American Film Institute (AFI)'s "100 Years, 100 Movies", and has been selected for preservation in the United States National Film Registry. High Noon was Foreman's greatest screenwriting accomplishment, but made no mention of him as associate producer – though it did credit him for the screenplay. He was nominated for an Academy Award for the screenplay by fellow members of the Academy of Motion Picture Arts and Sciences. Because of the blacklist, this was the last film Foreman was allowed to work on by a Hollywood studio for the next six years.

In October 1951 Foreman sold his interest in the Stanley Kramer Corporation for a reported $250,000. He formed a new company, Carl Foreman Productions, whose stockholders originally included actor Gary Cooper. Foreman signed a three-picture deal with Robert L. Lippert to write, produce and direct the films. Lippert said he "had no doubt of Foreman's Americanism." Yet, his films were never made because of political pressure, which also resulted in Gary Cooper and other investors withdrawing their support. Denied a passport because of the blacklist, Foreman successfully sued the United States Department of State to regain it. In 1952 he emigrated to Britain.

Foreman later said that if the blacklist "hadn't happened I was moving towards becoming a director. That was where the action was."

=== Britain ===
A number of blacklisted American writers were working in Britain at the time, such as Ring Lardner Jr. As "Derek Frye", he and fellow blacklistee Harold Buchman wrote the thriller The Sleeping Tiger (1954) which was directed by Joseph Losey, also blacklisted in the US. Foreman used the names of friends Herbert Baker, John Weaver, and Alan Grogan on his scripts as a personal signature.

In November 1953, the State Department ordered Foreman to surrender his passport to the US Consul in London, and in September 1954 the department ruled that Foreman was not entitled to his passport.

In 1954, Foreman worked as an assistant for British director Alexander Korda. "I was very angry: full of rage, and self-pity", he said of this time.

After working on Born for Trouble (1955), he wrote a draft of the screenplay for The Bridge on the River Kwai (1957) for Sam Spiegel and David Lean. Foreman later fell out with Lean, but was the one who recommended his replacement, fellow blacklisted writer Michael Wilson. The two did not receive a credit on the film. The resulting Academy Award for adapted screenplay went to French author Pierre Boulle, who had written the source novel but who had no involvement in the script (and could not speak English). The two scriptwriters did not receive credit for their work on this film until 1984, after their deaths, when the two writers' names were added to the award. By 1958, however, Foreman was publicly claiming credit for the screenplay.

Foreman also worked on A Hatful of Rain (1957), for which he received no credit. It was directed by Zinnemann.

Eventually a court ruled that the State Department could not take away someone's passport without a quasi-judicial hearing. In January 1956 Foreman's passport was reinstated and returned to him. In August 1956, Foreman gained approval to go to the United States and testify in executive session before the House Un-American Activities Committee, but he refused to become an informant. He invoked the Fifth Amendment to refuse to answer some questions.

=== Writer-Producer ===
Bridge on the River Kwai had been a massive commercial and critical success, and Foreman's contribution was recognized. He set up his own production company, Highroad. In March 1957, he signed a deal with Columbia Pictures, which had released Kwai, to make four films over three years.

In 1957, Foreman announced he would make Insurrection, about the 1916 Easter Rebellion in Ireland, with director John Guillermin. It would have been adapted from a novel by American writer Herman Wouk, but the film was not made.

Foreman wrote and helped produce The Key (1958), a war film directed by Carol Reed. Highroad next made the comedy The Mouse that Roared (1959), starring Peter Sellers, which was a big hit. Mouse was meant to be part of a four-picture slate from Foreman worth $11 million; the others were The Guns of Navarone (1961), and Holiday.

Foreman wrote and produced The Guns of Navarone (1961), based on a best-selling novel by Alistair McLean. He fired director Alexander Mackendrick shortly before production started, and replaced him with J. Lee Thompson. The resulting movie was a massive hit. He was intending to follow it with The Holiday, with Anthony Quinn, Charles Boyer, Earl Holliman and Ingrid Bergman, but the film was never produced.

The success of Guns of Navarone enabled Foreman to direct as well as to write and produce his next film, The Victors (1963) for Columbia. A war story, this film was a box office disappointment.

He signed a contract with MGM to adapt The Forty Days of Musa Dagh, at a fee of $275,000, but this film was never made. In 1962, he said "the bulk of Hollywood movies are old fashioned and creaky. There is nothing here to compare with the ferment of Great Britain, Italy, France or even Poland."

Foreman's next big success was the film Born Free (1966), which Foreman produced. In 1968, Foreman announced he would produce a musical, The House of Madame Tellier, based on a story by Guy de Maupassant, with music by Dimitri Tiomkin, and book and lyrics by Freddy Douglas, but it was not produced.

He wrote and produced Mackenna's Gold (1969) for Columbia. It had the same director, J. Lee Thompson, and star Gregory Peck, as Guns of Navarone. Mackenna's Gold was his first film shot in the US since High Noon. "I tried very hard to break the blacklist but I never succeeded", he said. The film was a flop on release, but remains a perennial revival on TV.

The Virgin Soldiers (1969), which his company made for Columbia, was a hit in Great Britain. His company also worked on Monsieur Lecoq (never completed) and Otley (1969). It developed a project called Fifteen Flags, about the Allied intervention in the Russian Civil War, but this was never completed as a film.

Foreman's next big production was Young Winston (1972), about British wartime prime minister Winston Churchill, which he wrote and produced, with Richard Attenborough directing. It was not particularly successful; neither was Living Free (1972), a sequel to Born Free.

He tried to get financing for a film about a rafting trip across the Indian Ocean, Finding Ernie, which he would direct, but it was not made.

=== Return to US ===
In 1975, Foreman returned to the US, and signed a three-picture contract with Universal. Foreman co-wrote and helped produce a sequel to Navarone, Force 10 from Navarone (1978). It did not match the success of its predecessor.

He executive produced The Golden Gate Murders (1979). Foreman's last credit was as writer of disaster movie, When Time Ran Out (1980). This was a notable flop.

His final project was writing the screenplay for The Yellow Jersey, a proposed film about the Tour de France bicycle race. It was to star Dustin Hoffman.

== Awards ==
Foreman was elected to the executive council of the British Film Production Association, was made a fellow of the Royal Society of Arts and was appointed a governor of the British Film Institute (1965–71), the British National Film School and the Cinematographic Film Council.

He was president for seven years of the Writers Guild of Great Britain.

In 1970, Foreman was made a Commander of the Order of the British Empire. Such is his influence on the British film industry, that from 1998 to 2009 there was a British Academy Film Award named in his honor; the Carl Foreman Award for the Most Promising Newcomer.

When he returned to the US, he served on the advisory board of the American Film Institute, on the public-media panel of the National Endowment for the Arts, and on the executive board of the Writers Guild of America. He was also a member of the board of directors of the Center Theater Group in Los Angeles.

== Personal life ==
Carl Foreman was back home in the United States when he died of a brain tumor in 1984 in Beverly Hills, California. The day before he died he was told he would receive the long overdue Oscar credit for writing Bridge on the River Kwai.

He married Estelle Barr, and they had a daughter Katie. They divorced. He married again, to Evelyn Smith. Their two children, Amanda and Jonathan, were born in London. He was also survived by his mother, Fanny, and sister Sherry Sobel (mother of Ted Sobel, Los Angeles based sportscaster-reporter-author of memoir Touching Greatness.)

Foreman's daughter, Amanda Foreman, graduated from Columbia University and Oxford University, where she received a PhD in history. She won the Whitbread Prize for her 1998 best-selling biography Georgiana: Duchess of Devonshire. She later wrote the history, A World on Fire: Britain's Crucial Role in the American Civil War (2011).

Foreman's son, Jonathan Foreman, graduated in modern history from Cambridge University and earned a law degree from the University of Pennsylvania. He worked as an editorial writer and senior film critic for the New York Post. In 2004, he relocated to London to work for the Daily Mail. In 2008, he became a co-founder of the monthly British magazine Standpoint, which explores current affairs from a centre-right position.

== Red Scare ==
Foreman's work on High Noon intersected with the period of the second Red Scare after World War II and the Korean War. During the Cold War, some American politicians began to fear communist activities in the United States. Foreman was called before HUAC while he was writing the film. By then he had not been a member of the American communist party for nearly ten years. Because he declined to 'name names', or identify other people who had been members, he was classified as an 'un-cooperative witness' by HUAC. When Stanley Kramer found out some of this, he forced Foreman to sell his part of their company, and tried to get him kicked off making this film. Fred Zinnemann, Gary Cooper, and Bruce Church intervened. An outstanding Bank of America loan helped Foreman remain on the picture, as Foreman had not yet signed certain papers. He moved to England before the film was released, as Congress had established a blacklist and movie studios did not allow persons on it to work for them.

Kramer claimed he had not stood up for Foreman partly because Foreman was threatening to name Kramer as a Communist. Foreman said that Kramer was afraid of what would happen to him and his career if he did not cooperate with the committee. Kramer wanted Foreman to name names and not plead Fifth Amendment rights. Foreman was also pressured by Harry Cohn of Columbia Pictures (Kramer's new boss); actor John Wayne, who was associated with the Motion Picture Alliance for the Preservation of American Ideals and said he would "never regret having helped run Foreman out of this country". He called High Noon "un-American". Influential society writer Hedda Hopper of the Los Angeles Times also pressed Foreman to testify about names.

In addition to screenwriters, directors, actors and producers affected by the confrontations with HUAC, cast and crew members were affected by the Congressional investigation and blacklist. For instance, Howland Chamberlain was blacklisted, while Floyd Crosby and Lloyd Bridges were "gray listed."

== Documentaries on Foreman ==
In 2002, PBS television made a two-hour film about Foreman's ordeal during McCarthyism titled Darkness at High Noon: The Carl Foreman Documents. It was written and directed by outspoken conservative Lionel Chetwynd.

Foreman was also the subject of an episode of Screenwriters: Words Into Image, directed by Terry Sanders and Freida Lee Mock.

== Filmography ==
Year	Title	Writer	Producer	Presenter	Director(s)	Notes
1941	Bowery Blitzkrieg	Yes			Wallace Fox	Uncredited
1941	Spooks Run Wild	Yes			Phil Rosen	
1942	Rhythm Parade	Yes			Howard Bretherton	
1945	Know Your Enemy – Japan	Yes			Frank Capra; Joris Ivens	Uncredited; Documentary film
1945	Dakota	Yes			Joseph Kane	Story only
1948	So This Is New York	Yes			Richard Fleischer	
1949	The Clay Pigeon	Yes			Richard Fleischer	
1949	Champion	Yes			Mark Robson	
1949	Home of the Brave	Yes			Mark Robson	
1949	Let's Go to the Movies	Yes			Tholen Gladden	Uncredited; Documentary film
1950	Young Man with a Horn	Yes			Michael Curtiz	
1950	The Men	Yes			Fred Zinnemann	
1950	Cyrano de Bergerac	Yes			Michael Gordon	
1952	High Noon	Yes	Yes		Fred Zinnemann	Uncredited associate producer
1954	The Sleeping Tiger	Yes			Joseph Losey	Credited as "Derek Frye"
1955	Born for Trouble	Yes			Desmond Davis	Credited as "Derek Frye"
1957	A Hatful of Rain	Yes			Fred Zinnemann	Uncredited
1957	The Bridge on the River Kwai	Yes			David Lean	Uncredited
1958	The Key	Yes	Yes		Carol Reed	
1959	The Mouse That Roared			Yes	Jack Arnold	Uncredited
1961	The Guns of Navarone	Yes	Yes		J. Lee Thompson	
1963	The Victors	Yes	Yes		Himself	Directorial debut (only directoral credit)
1966	Born Free			Yes	James Hill	Presenter
1967	Monsieur Lecoq		Yes		Seth Holt	Unfinished
1969	Otley		Yes		Dick Clement	Executive producer
1969	Mackenna's Gold	Yes	Yes		J. Lee Thompson	
1969	The Virgin Soldiers		Yes	Yes	John Dexter	Executive producer
1972	Living Free		Yes	Yes	Jack Couffer	Executive producer
1972	Young Winston	Yes	Yes		Richard Attenborough	
1974	Born Free	Yes			Leonard Horn; Gary Nelson; Barry Crane; Paul Krasny; Russ Mayberry; Richard Benedict; Jack Couffer	Television series Creator and developer 13 episodes Story for episode "Elsa's Odyssey"
1976–78	One-Upmanship			Yes	Ray Butt	Television series Arranger 16 episodes
1978	Force 10 from Navarone	Yes	Yes		Guy Hamilton	Story only Executive producer
1979	The Golden Gate Murders		Yes		Walter Grauman	Television film Executive producer
1980	When Time Ran Out	Yes			James Goldstone	

== Major awards ==
=== Wins ===
- 1953 : WGA Award for Best Written American Drama – High Noon
- 1958 : Academy Award for Writing Adapted Screenplay – The Bridge on the River Kwai (awarded posthumously)
- 1973 : Writers' Guild of Great Britain for Best British Screenplay – Young Winston

=== Nominations ===
- 1950 : Academy Award for Writing Adapted Screenplay – Champion
- 1950 : WGA Award for Best Written American Drama Champion
- 1951 : Academy Award for Writing Original Screenplay – The Men
- 1951 : WGA Award for Best Written American Drama – The Men
- 1953 : Academy Award for Writing Adapted Screenplay – High Noon
- 1953 : Golden Globe Award for Best Screenplay – Motion Picture – High Noon
- 1962 : Academy Award for Writing Adapted Screenplay – The Guns of Navarone
- 1962 : Academy Award for Best Picture – The Guns of Navarone
- 1962 : BAFTA Award for Best British Screenplay – The Guns of Navarone
- 1973 : Academy Award for Writing Original Screenplay – Young Winston

== Sources ==
- Byman, Jeremy (2004). Showdown at High Noon: Witch-hunts, Critics, and the End of the Western. Scarecrow Press. ISBN 0-8108-4998-4.
