= Stanley Kramer =

American film director and producer (1913–2001)

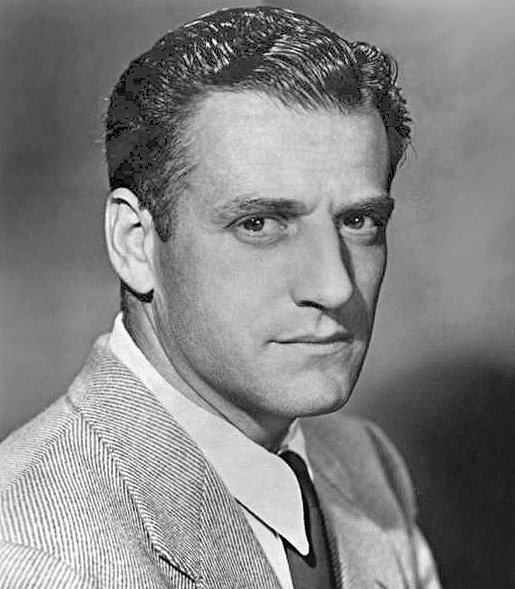
- Kramer in 1955
- Born: September 29, 1913; New York City, U.S.
- Died: February 19, 2001 (aged 87); Los Angeles, California, U.S.
- Occupations: Director; producer
- Years active: 1933–1997
- Spouses: Marilyn Erskine (m. 1945; ann. 1945); Anne Pearce Kramer (m. 1950; div. 1963); Karen Sharpe (m. 1966)
- Children: 4
- Relatives: Perce Pearce (former-father-in-law)

Stanley Earl Kramer (September 29, 1913 – February 19, 2001) was an American film director and producer, responsible for making many of Hollywood's most famous "message films" (he called his movies heavy dramas) and a liberal movie icon. As an independent producer and director, he brought attention to topical social issues that most studios avoided. Among the subjects covered in his films were racism (in The Defiant Ones and Guess Who's Coming to Dinner), nuclear war (in On the Beach), greed (in It's a Mad, Mad, Mad, Mad World), creationism vs. evolution (in Inherit the Wind), and the causes and effects of fascism (in Judgment at Nuremberg). His other films included High Noon (1952, as producer), The Caine Mutiny (1954, as producer), and Ship of Fools (1965).

Director Steven Spielberg described him as an "incredibly talented visionary" and "one of our great filmmakers, not just for the art and passion he put on screen, but for the impact he has made on the conscience of the world." Kramer was recognized for his fierce independence as a producer-director, with author Victor Navasky writing that "among the independents...none seemed more vocal, more liberal, more pugnacious than young Stanley Kramer." His friend Kevin Spacey honored him in his acceptance speech for the 2015 Golden Globe for Best Actor in a TV Drama, calling him "one of the great filmmakers of all time."

Despite uneven critical reception, both then and now, Kramer's body of work has received many awards, including 16 Academy Awards and 80 nominations, and he was nominated nine times as either producer or director. In 1961, he received the Irving G. Thalberg Memorial Award. In 1963, he was a member of the jury at the 3rd Moscow International Film Festival. In 1998, he was awarded the first NAACP Vanguard Award in recognition of "the strong social themes that ran through his body of work". In 2002, the Stanley Kramer Award was created, to be awarded to recipients whose work "dramatically illustrates provocative social issues".

== Early life ==
Kramer was born in New York City. His parents were Jewish, and having separated when he was very young, he remembered little about his father. His mother worked at a New York office of Paramount Pictures, during which time his grandparents took care of him at home. His uncle, Earl Kramer, worked in distribution at Universal Pictures.

Kramer attended DeWitt Clinton High School in the Bronx, where he graduated at age fifteen. He then enrolled in New York University, where he became a member of the Pi Lambda Phi fraternity and wrote a weekly column for the Medley magazine. He graduated in 1933 at the age of nineteen with a degree in business administration. After developing a "zest for writing" with a newspaper, biographer Donald Spoto wrote, Kramer was offered a paid internship in the writing department of 20th Century Fox and moved to Hollywood. Until receiving that writing job, he had planned to enroll in law school.

== Film career ==
=== Move to Hollywood ===
Over the following years, during the period of the Great Depression, Kramer took odd jobs in the film industry: He worked as a set furniture mover and film cutter at MGM, as writer and researcher for Columbia Pictures and Republic Pictures, and associate producer with Loew-Lewin productions. Those years as an apprentice writer and editor helped him acquire an "exceptional aptitude" in editing and develop the ability to understand the overall structure of the films he worked on. They enabled him to later compose and edit "in camera," as he shot scenes.

He was drafted into the U.S. Army in 1943 during World War II, where he helped make training films with the Signal Corps in New York, along with other Hollywood filmmakers including Frank Capra and Anatole Litvak. He left the army with the rank of first lieutenant.

After the war, Kramer soon discovered that there were no available jobs in Hollywood in 1947, so he created an independent production company, Screen Plays Inc. He partnered with writer Herbie Baker, publicist George Glass and producer Carl Foreman, an army friend from the film unit. Foreman justified the production company by noting that the big studios had become "dinosaurs," which, being shocked by the onrush of television, "jettisoned virtually everything to survive." But they failed to develop cadres of younger creative talent in their wake.

=== Producer ===
Kramer's new company was able to take advantage of unused production facilities by renting time, allowing him to create independent films for a fraction of the cost the larger studios had required, and he did so without studio control. Kramer also saw this as an opportunity to produce films dealing with subjects the studios previously avoided, especially those about controversial topics.

However, Kramer soon learned that financing such independent films was a major obstacle, as he was forced to approach banks or else take on private investors. He did both when necessary. But with studios no longer involved, rival independent companies were created which all competed for those limited funds. According to Byman, "there were no fewer than ninety-six" other companies in competition during that period, and included some of Hollywood's biggest names: Frank Capra, John Ford, William Wyler, Howard Hawks, Leo McCarey, and George Stevens. Kramer explained how he tried to differentiate his new company from the others, explaining he was less interested in the money than having the ability to make a statement through his films:

Instead of relying on star names, we pinned our faith in stories that had something to say. If it happened to be something that other movies hadn't said before, so much the better. The only basis of choice was personal taste.

The first movie produced under his production company was the comedy So This Is New York (1948), directed by Richard Fleischer, and based on Ring Lardner's The Big Town. It failed at the box office. It was followed with Champion (1949), another Lardner story, this one about an ambitious and unscrupulous boxer. Written by Foreman, it was tailored to the talents of Kirk Douglas, a former amateur wrestler who was now an actor. Filmed in only 23 days with a relatively small budget, it became an immense box-office success. It won an Academy Award for Best Editing, with four other nominations, including Douglas for best actor and Foreman as screenwriter.

Kramer next produced Home of the Brave (also 1949), again directed by Mark Robson, which became an even bigger success than Champion. The story was adapted from a play by Arthur Laurents, originally about anti-Semitism in the army, but revised and made into a film about the persecution of a black soldier. Byman notes that it was the "first sound film about antiblack racism." The subject matter was so sensitive at the time, that Kramer shot the film in "total secrecy" to avoid protests by various organizations. Critics generally liked the film, which, notes Nora Sayre, "had a flavoring of courage."

His renamed Stanley Kramer Company produced The Men (1950), which featured Marlon Brando's screen debut, in a drama about paraplegic war veterans. It was the first time Kramer and Foreman worked with director Fred Zinnemann, who had been directing for twenty years and had won an Oscar. The film was another success for Kramer, who took on a unique subject dealing with a world few knew about. Critic Bosley Crowther noted that its "striking and authentic documentary quality has been imported to the whole film in every detail, attitude and word."

Zinnemann said he was impressed with Kramer's company and the efficiency of their productions:

They struck me as being enormously efficient. Kramer was very inventive in finding quite unlikely sources of finance...This method of outside financing...was truly original and far ahead of its time...There were no luxurious offices, no major-studio bureaucracy, no small internal empires to be dealt with, no waste of time or effort...I was enthusiastic about this independent setup and the energy it created.

Also released in 1950 was Kramer's production of Cyrano de Bergerac, the first English language film version of Edmond Rostand's 1897 French play. It made a star of José Ferrer, who won his only Oscar for Best Actor.

==== Films with Columbia Pictures ====
In 1951, Columbia Pictures president Harry Cohn offered Kramer's company an opportunity to form a production unit working with his studio. Kramer was given free rein over what films he chose to make, along with a budget of nearly a million dollars each. Kramer agreed to a five-year contract during which time he would produce 20 films. However, Kramer later stated that the agreement was "one of the most dangerous and foolhardy moves of my entire career." He agreed to the commitment because of his "deep-seated desire to direct," he states, along with the security of ready studio financing.

His last independent production was High Noon (1952), a Western drama directed by Fred Zinnemann. The movie was well received, winning four Oscars, as well as three other nominations. Unfortunately, High Noon's production and release intersected with McCarthyism. Writer, producer and partner Carl Foreman was called before the House Un-American Activities Committee while he was writing the film. Foreman had been a member of the Communist Party ten years earlier, but declined to "name names" and was branded an "un-cooperative witness" by HUAC, and then blacklisted by the Hollywood companies, after which he sold his interest in the company. Kramer, a long time friend and business partner of Carl Foreman removed Foreman's name from the credits as co-producer.

Kramer continued producing movies at Columbia, including Death of a Salesman (1951), The Sniper (1952), The Member of the Wedding (1952), The Juggler (1953), The Wild One (1953) and The 5,000 Fingers of Dr. T. (1953). With a larger budget, his films took on a "glossier" more polished look, yet his next 10 films all lost money, although some were nonetheless highly praised.

In 1953, Cohn and Kramer agreed to terminate the five-year, 20-film contract Kramer had signed. However, his last Columbia film, The Caine Mutiny (1954), regained all of the losses Columbia had incurred as a result of his earlier projects. The Caine Mutiny was an adaptation of the book written by Herman Wouk and was directed by Edward Dmytryk.

Kramer observed that during the 1940s and 1950s, "cinema was the producer's medium:"

It was the day of Selznick and Thalberg and Goldwyn. They were the powers incarnate because the producer was boss.

=== Director ===
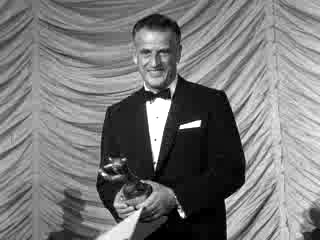
Stanley Kramer receives an award at the 1960 Berlin Film Festival for Inherit the Wind.

After The Caine Mutiny, Kramer left Columbia and resumed his independent productions, this time in the role of the director. Over the next two decades, Kramer reestablished his reputation within the film industry by directing a continual series of often successful films dealing with social and controversial issues, such as racism, nuclear war, greed and the causes and effects of fascism. Critic Charles Champlin later described Kramer as "a guy who fought some hard battles. He took on social issues when it was not popular to do so in Hollywood."

Among some of those controversial films were Not as a Stranger (1955), The Pride and the Passion (1957), The Defiant Ones (1958), On the Beach (1959), Inherit the Wind (1960), Judgment at Nuremberg (1961), and Guess Who's Coming to Dinner (1967). In addition to dramas, he directed It's a Mad, Mad, Mad, Mad World (1963).

His first film as director was Not as a Stranger (1955), the story of medical students and their career, some of whom lose their idealism and succumb to blind ambition, adultery, and immoral behavior. The film was a "smash hit," but reviews were mixed. Pauline Kael claimed it "lacked rhythm and development."

==== The Pride and the Passion (1957) ====
The Pride and the Passion (1957) is an adaptation from The Gun, a novel by C. S. Forester. It portrays in detail how a dedicated group of Spanish guerrillas dragged a gigantic cannon across half the country in an effort to defeat Napoleon's advancing army. It stars Frank Sinatra, Cary Grant and Sophia Loren.

==== The Defiant Ones (1958) ====
The following year, Kramer directed The Defiant Ones (1958), the story of two escaped convicts in the Deep South, one black, played by Sidney Poitier, and one white, Tony Curtis. To add to the intensity of the drama, both men are shackled together with chains, forcing them, despite their wishes, into a sense of brotherhood, suffering and fear.

New York Times film critic Bosley Crowther lauded the production and the acting in the film, calling it "a remarkably apt and dramatic visualization of a social idea—the idea of men of different races brought together to face misfortune in a bond of brotherhood — is achieved by producer Stanley Kramer in his new film." It was nominated for eight Academy Awards, winning two.

Five years after the film was released, producer George Stevens Jr. helped organize a showing of this, along with other Kramer films, at the Moscow Film Festival, which Kramer and co-star Sidney Poitier attended. Stevens writes that the showings of his films, especially The Defiant Ones, were a "great success in Moscow." He remembers that "filmmakers applauded his films, often chanting Kraaaamer, Kraaaaamer, Kraaaaamer," at their conclusion. Kramer spoke to the audience after each film, "making a fine impression for his country." Stevens credits The Defiant Ones for having the most impact, however:

The screening was one of the most emotional I have experienced. After the film, the crowd stood—many with tears in their eyes—and gave Poitier and Kramer an ovation that subsided only when we had left the auditorium. Stanley's visit to Moscow marked the high point in the cultural exchange between the two countries during those long years of estrangement.

==== On the Beach (1959) ====
With On the Beach (1959), Kramer tried to tackle the sensitive subject of nuclear war. The film takes place after World War III has annihilated most of the Northern hemisphere, with radioactive dust on a trajectory towards Australia. Kramer gave the film an "effective and eerie" documentary look at depopulated cities. It starred Gregory Peck, Ava Gardner, Fred Astaire and Anthony Perkins.

Reviews were mostly positive, not just from critics but from scientists. Linus Pauling, winner of two Nobel Prizes (Chemistry and Peace), commented:

It may be that some years from now we can look back and say that On the Beach is the movie that saved the world.

Critics Arthur Knight and Hollis Alpert likewise praised the film and admired Kramer for showing "courage in attempting such a theme."

==== Inherit the Wind (1960) ====
Inherit the Wind (1960) became Kramer's next challenging film, this one taking on the highly charged subjects of creationism and evolution, and how they are taught in school. The film, an adaptation of the play of the same name, written by Jerome Lawrence and Robert Edwin Lee, was a fictionalized account of the 1925 Scopes Trial, which concerned a violation of Tennessee's Butler Act. This law had made it unlawful to teach human evolution in any state-funded school in Tennessee. It starred Spencer Tracy, portraying a character based on Clarence Darrow, defending the teacher, and Fredric March as his rival attorney, based on William Jennings Bryan, who insisted that creationism was the only valid subject that should be taught to children. It was nominated for four Academy Awards.

For Tracy, who was nominated as Best Actor, the film became the first of four films he did for Kramer. "Everybody tells me how good I am," he said, "but only Stanley gives me work." The film received "extravagant reviews," yet failed at the box office due to its poor distribution and advertising. In addition, fundamentalist groups labeled the film "anti-God" and called Kramer "anti-Christ." Kramer, however, explains that these groups failed to understand the real theme of the film and the actual court trial it portrayed:

The spirit of the trial lives on, because the real issues of that trial were man's right to think and man's right to teach...the real theme of Inherit the Wind.

Kramer also notes that the film was the third part of a "trilogy of what have been called by some 'controversial pictures,'" of which the first two were The Defiant Ones and On the Beach. "I have attempted, and I hope succeeded in, making pictures that command attention," said Kramer.

==== Judgment at Nuremberg (1961) ====
Like his previous film, Judgment at Nuremberg (1961) was a fictionalized account of a real trial, this one about the Nuremberg Trials held after the defeat of the Nazis in World War II. It also starred Spencer Tracy as the leading judge, along with numerous other stars. Richard Widmark played the American military prosecutor, and Maximilian Schell played the defense attorney. The film was nominated for 11 Academy Awards and won two: Schell as Best Actor and Abby Mann for Best Screenplay. Reviews were extremely positive. Critic Hollis Alpert wrote in his review:

Stanley Kramer has once again used film importantly and continues to emerge as the only truly responsible moviemaker in Hollywood.

Similarly, Arthur Knight credited Kramer for the film's significance: "From first to last, the director is in command of his material. ...he has not only added hugely to his stature as a producer-director, but to the stature of the American film as well."

However, despite mostly rave reviews in the U.S. and many countries in Europe, biographer Spoto notes that during its various premieres overseas, "it shocked many, angered some, disgusted others. But it bored no one." Kramer described its world premiere, in Berlin, as "the most frightening evening in my life." It was attended by hundreds of dignitaries from throughout Germany.

[Mayor] Willy Brandt stood up and warned the audience that they might not find the film pleasant, but that if Berlin was ever to regard itself as a capital city, then this film should be shown there because it was about all of them. "We may like or dislike or disagree with many things," he said, "but here it is."

Well, the film went on, and when it was over there was a deafening silence...The film was totally rejected: it never did three cents' business in Germany. It played so many empty houses it just stopped.

William Shatner, who had a supporting role, recalls that prior to filming, Kramer and screenwriter Abby Mann required that everyone involved in the production, actors and crew alike, watch some films taken by American soldiers at the liberation of the concentration camps. "They wanted us to understand what this film was about":

These films had not yet been released to the public; very few people had seen them. We didn't know what to expect...We watched scenes of bulldozers shoving piles of bodies into mass graves. We saw survivors, their eyes bulging, their bones practically protruding from their bodies. We saw the crematoriums and the piles of shoes. People gasped in shock, others started crying. Certainly it was the most horrifying thing I had ever seen in my life...But from that night on we understood the importance of the film we were making.

==== It's a Mad, Mad, Mad, Mad World (1963) ====
After the seriousness of his previous films, Kramer "felt compelled to answer" for the "lack of lightness" in his earlier films, writes Spoto. As a result, he directed It's a Mad, Mad, Mad, Mad World (1963), a film with a "gifted, wacky crew of comedians." Kramer describes it as a "comedy about greed." According to one writer, he directed it "to prove he could also handle comedy" and hired many of the leading comedic actors of the previous decades, from silent star Buster Keaton to emerging talent Jonathan Winters. Winters later wrote that "Kramer was a man who took chances—as they say, he worked without a net."

It played to mixed reviews with some criticizing its excessive comedy with too many comedians, thereby losing its focus. Nonetheless, it was Kramer's biggest box office hit, and the public enjoyed its "socially disruptive and goofy" story and acting. Film critic Dwight Macdonald writes that its "small army of actors—105 speaking roles—inflict mayhem on each other with cars, planes, explosives and other devices...is simply too much for the human eye and ear to respond to, let alone the funny bone," calling it "hard-core slapstick." It was nominated for six Academy Awards, winning for Best Sound Editing.

==== Ship of Fools (1965) ====
Ship of Fools (1965) has been described as a "floating Grand Hotel," an earlier film which also had an all-star cast. Its multi-strand narrative deals with the failing personal relationships among the passengers on board a passenger liner returning to Germany in 1933, during the rise of Nazism. Spoto describes its theme as one of "conscious social and psychological significance." It won two Academy Awards and was nominated for six others.

Some writers describe the film as a "microcosm" displaying a "weakness of the world that permitted the rise of Hitler." Kramer does not disagree, and wrote, "Even though we never mention him [Hitler] in the picture, his ascendancy is an ever-present factor. Most of the passengers on the ship are Germans, returning to their fatherland at a time when millions of other Germans are looking for ways to escape." In a scene noted by Spoto, a Nazi passenger is "barking inanities" about how Germans should purify their race, to which a German-Jewish passenger responds, "There are nearly a million Jews in Germany. What are they going to do — kill us all?"

==== Guess Who's Coming to Dinner (1967) ====
For his fourth film about the sensitive subject of racism, he both directed and produced Guess Who's Coming to Dinner (1967), a groundbreaking story about interracial marriage. It starred Spencer Tracy, Sidney Poitier, and Katharine Hepburn, winning two Academy Awards with eight nominations. It has been listed in the top 100 films over the last 100 years by the American Film Institute. However, despite its popularity with the public and its box-office success, many critics gave it negative reviews.

For Kramer and others involved in the production, it "was one of the most important events of their lives," writes Spoto. Partly because it was the first film that touched the subject since the 1920s silent era. "No one would touch this most explosive of social issues" until Kramer took on the challenge. Co-star Sidney Poitier called the film "revolutionary," and stated why:

No producer, no director could get the money, nor would theaters in America book it. But Kramer made people look at the issue for the first time...He treated the theme with humor, but so delicately, so humanly, so lovingly that he made everyone look at the question for the very first time in film history!

The film was also important as it was the last film role for Spencer Tracy, who was aware while making the film that he was dying and did in fact die a few weeks after its completion. It was his fourth film directed by Kramer and his ninth with Hepburn, who was so shaken by Tracy's death, that she refused to watch the film after it was completed. Kramer called Tracy "the greatest actor I ever worked with."

As a result of this film's commercial success, Kramer helped spur on Hollywood to reform its film marketing practices when it was observed that the film was doing excellent business everywhere in the U.S., including the Southern states where it was assumed that the prominent presence of Black actors in lead roles would never be accepted. However, Kramer, bothered by the film's negative reviews and wanting respect as an important film artist like François Truffaut and Jean-Luc Godard, undertook a nine-college speaking tour to screen the film and discuss racial integration. The effort proved a dispiriting embarrassment for him with college students largely dismissing his film and preferring to discuss less conventional fare like Bonnie and Clyde directed by Arthur Penn.

The film was Kramer's last major success, and his subsequent films were not profitable, and many had mixed reviews. Among those films were The Secret of Santa Vittoria (1968), R.P.M. (1970), Bless the Beasts and Children (1971), Oklahoma Crude (1973), The Domino Principle (1977), and The Runner Stumbles (1979). Oklahoma Crude was entered into the 8th Moscow International Film Festival where Kramer won the Golden Prize for Direction. At the time of his retirement, he was attempting to bring a script titled Three Solitary Drinkers to the screen, a film about a trio of alcoholics that he hoped would be played by Sidney Poitier, Jack Lemmon, and Walter Matthau.

== Retirement and death ==
In the 1980s, Kramer retired to Bellevue, Washington, and wrote a column on movies for The Seattle Times from 1980 to 1996. During this time, he hosted his own weekly movie show on then-independent television station KCPQ.

In 1986, he signed an agreement with Columbia Pictures to produce or direct two films, Chernobyl and Beirut, but the deal fell through when David Puttnam left Columbia. Three years later, he agreed to make ERN starring Robert Guillaume but the project stalled. In 1991, he signed a deal with Trimark to direct and produce Bubble Man, a project he had been working on since 1972, but it was not made.

In 1997, Kramer published his autobiography A Mad Mad Mad Mad World: A Life in Hollywood.

He died on February 19, 2001, in Woodland Hills, Los Angeles, aged 87, after contracting pneumonia. He was married three times and divorced twice. He was survived by his third wife, actress Karen Sharpe, and four children: Casey (1955–2023) and Larry (with Anne Pearce), and Katharine and Jennifer (with Karen Sharpe).

== Legacy ==
Kramer has been called "a genuine original" as a filmmaker. He made movies that he believed in, and "straddled the fence between art and commerce for more than 30 years." Most of his films were noted for engaging the audience with political and social issues of the time. When asked why he gravitated to those kinds of themes, he stated, "emotionally I am drawn to these subjects," and thought that independent productions like his might help "return vitality to the motion picture industry...If our industry is to flourish, we must break away from formula thinking."

Film author Bill Nichols states that "Kramer's films continue a long-standing Hollywood tradition of marrying topical issues to dramatic form, a tradition in which we find many of Hollywood's more openly progressive films." Among his themes, Kramer was one of the few filmmakers to delve into subjects relating to civil rights, and according to his wife, Karen Kramer, "put his reputation and finances on the line to present subject matter that meant something." He gave up his salary to make sure that Guess Who's Coming to Dinner was completed. However, he has not had universal acclaim. Film critic David Thomson has written that Kramer's "films are middlebrow and overemphatic; at worst, they are among the most tedious and dispiriting productions the American cinema has to offer. Commercialism, of the most crass and confusing kind...devitalised all [of] his projects."

Critics have labeled Kramer's films as "message movies." Some, like Pauline Kael, were often critical of his subject matter for being "melodramas," and "irritatingly self-righteous," but she credits his films for their "redeeming social importance...[with] situations and settings nevertheless excitingly modern, relevant." Kramer, however, saw himself as "a storyteller with a point of view":

Maybe I'm out of step with the times, because a lot of movies are made today with no statement at all, just shock and sensation, or a motivationless kind of approach to a story, a senseless crime, a pointless love affair...Like lots of kids in the 1930s, I wanted to right all the wrongs of mankind...I'm not interested in changing anyone's opinion, just in telling a story.

In the 1960s Kramer blamed the growing "youth culture" with having changed the "artistic landscape" as he remembered it from his own youth. "No longer," he said, "were writers or filmmakers interested in creating the Great American Novel or the great American film, or indeed with exploring what it meant to be American."

In extreme cases, Kramer was accused of being "anti-American" due to the themes of his films, many concerning social problems or pathologies. But Kramer notes that it was his ability to produce those films in a democracy which distinguishes them:

Any American film that contains criticism of the American fabric of life is accepted, both critically and by the mass audience overseas, as being something that could never have been produced in a totalitarian state. This in itself builds tremendous respect for American society among foreigners—a respect I've always wanted to encourage.

Kramer produced and directed 23 different actors in Oscar-nominated performances, with José Ferrer, Gary Cooper, Maximilian Schell and Katharine Hepburn winning for their performances. Kramer's was among the first stars to be completed on the Hollywood Walk of Fame on March 28, 1960, out of the original 1,550 stars created and installed as a unit in 1960.

One of his daughters, Kat Kramer, is co-producer of socially relevant documentaries, as part of her series Films That Change the World.

=== The Stanley Kramer Award ===
The Producers Guild of America established the Stanley Kramer Award in 2002 to honor a production or individuals whose contribution illuminates and raises public awareness of important social issues.

== Filmography ==
=== As producer and director ===
- Not as a Stranger (1955)
- The Pride and the Passion (1957)
- The Defiant Ones (1958)
- On the Beach (1959)
- Inherit the Wind (1960)
- Judgment at Nuremberg (1961)
- It's a Mad, Mad, Mad, Mad World (1963)
- Ship of Fools (1965)
- Guess Who's Coming to Dinner (1967)
- The Secret of Santa Vittoria (1968)
- R.P.M. (1970)
- Bless the Beasts and Children (1971)
- Oklahoma Crude (1973)
- Judgment: The Trial of Julius and Ethel Rosenberg (1974)
- Judgment: The Court-Martial of the Tiger of Malaya – General Yamashita (1974)
- Judgment: The Court-Martial of Lieutenant William Calley (1975)
- The Domino Principle (1977)
- The Runner Stumbles (1979)

=== As producer only ===
- The Moon and Sixpence (associate producer, 1942)
- So This Is New York (1948)
- Champion (1949)
- Home of the Brave (1949)
- The Men (1950)
- Cyrano de Bergerac (1950)
- Death of a Salesman (1951)
- High Noon (1952) (uncredited)
- The Sniper (1952)
- The Happy Time (1952)
- The Member of the Wedding (1952)
- Eight Iron Men (1952)
- The Wild One (1953)
- The Juggler (1953)
- The 5,000 Fingers of Dr. T. (1953)
- The Caine Mutiny (1954)
- Pressure Point (1962)
- A Child Is Waiting (1963)

== Academy Award nominations ==
Year	Award	Film	Resulting Win
1952	Best Picture	High Noon	Cecil B. DeMille – The Greatest Show on Earth
1954	Best Picture	The Caine Mutiny	Sam Spiegel – On the Waterfront
1958	Best Picture	The Defiant Ones	Arthur Freed – Gigi
1958	Best Director	The Defiant Ones	Vincente Minnelli – Gigi
1961	Best Picture	Judgment at Nuremberg	Robert Wise – West Side Story
1961	Best Director	Judgment at Nuremberg	Jerome Robbins and Robert Wise – West Side Story
1961	Irving G. Thalberg Memorial Award		Won
1965	Best Picture	Ship of Fools	Robert Wise – The Sound of Music
1967	Best Picture	Guess Who's Coming to Dinner	Walter Mirisch – In the Heat of the Night
1967	Best Director	Guess Who's Coming to Dinner	Mike Nichols – The Graduate

== Accolades for theatrical features directed by Kramer ==
Year	Feature	Academy Awards		BAFTAs		Golden Globes	
Year	Feature	Nominations	Wins	Nominations	Wins	Nominations	Wins
1955	Not as a Stranger	1		1			
1958	The Defiant Ones	9	2	3	1	5	1
1959	On the Beach	2		2	1	5	1
1960	Inherit the Wind	4		3		2	
1961	Judgment at Nuremberg	11	2	3		6	2
1963	It's a Mad, Mad, Mad, Mad World	6	1			2	
1965	Ship of Fools	8	2	2		3	
1967	Guess Who's Coming to Dinner	10	2	4	3	7	
1969	The Secret of Santa Vittoria	2				6	1
1971	Bless the Beasts and Children	1					
1973	Oklahoma Crude					1	
Total		54	9	18	5	37	5

=== Oscar-related performances ===
These actors have received numerous Oscar nominations for their respective performances in Kramer's motion pictures.

Year	Performer	Feature	Result
Academy Award for Best Actor
1959	Tony Curtis	The Defiant Ones	Nominated
1959	Sidney Poitier	The Defiant Ones	Nominated
1961	Spencer Tracy	Inherit the Wind	Nominated
1962	Maximilian Schell	Judgment at Nuremberg	Won
1962	Spencer Tracy	Judgment at Nuremberg	Nominated
1966	Oskar Werner	Ship of Fools	Nominated
1968	Spencer Tracy	Guess Who's Coming to Dinner	Nominated†
Academy Award for Best Actress
1966	Simone Signoret	Ship of Fools	Nominated
1968	Katharine Hepburn	Guess Who's Coming to Dinner	Won
Academy Award for Best Supporting Actor
1959	Theodore Bikel	The Defiant Ones	Nominated
1962	Montgomery Clift	Judgement at Nuremberg	Nominated
1966	Michael Dunn	Ship of Fools	Nominated
1968	Cecil Kellaway	Guess Who's Coming to Dinner	Nominated
Academy Award for Best Supporting Actress
1959	Cara Williams	The Defiant Ones	Nominated
1962	Judy Garland	Judgement at Nuremberg	Nominated
1968	Beah Richards	Guess Who's Coming to Dinner	Nominated
