= The Heiress =

1949 American drama film directed by William Wyler

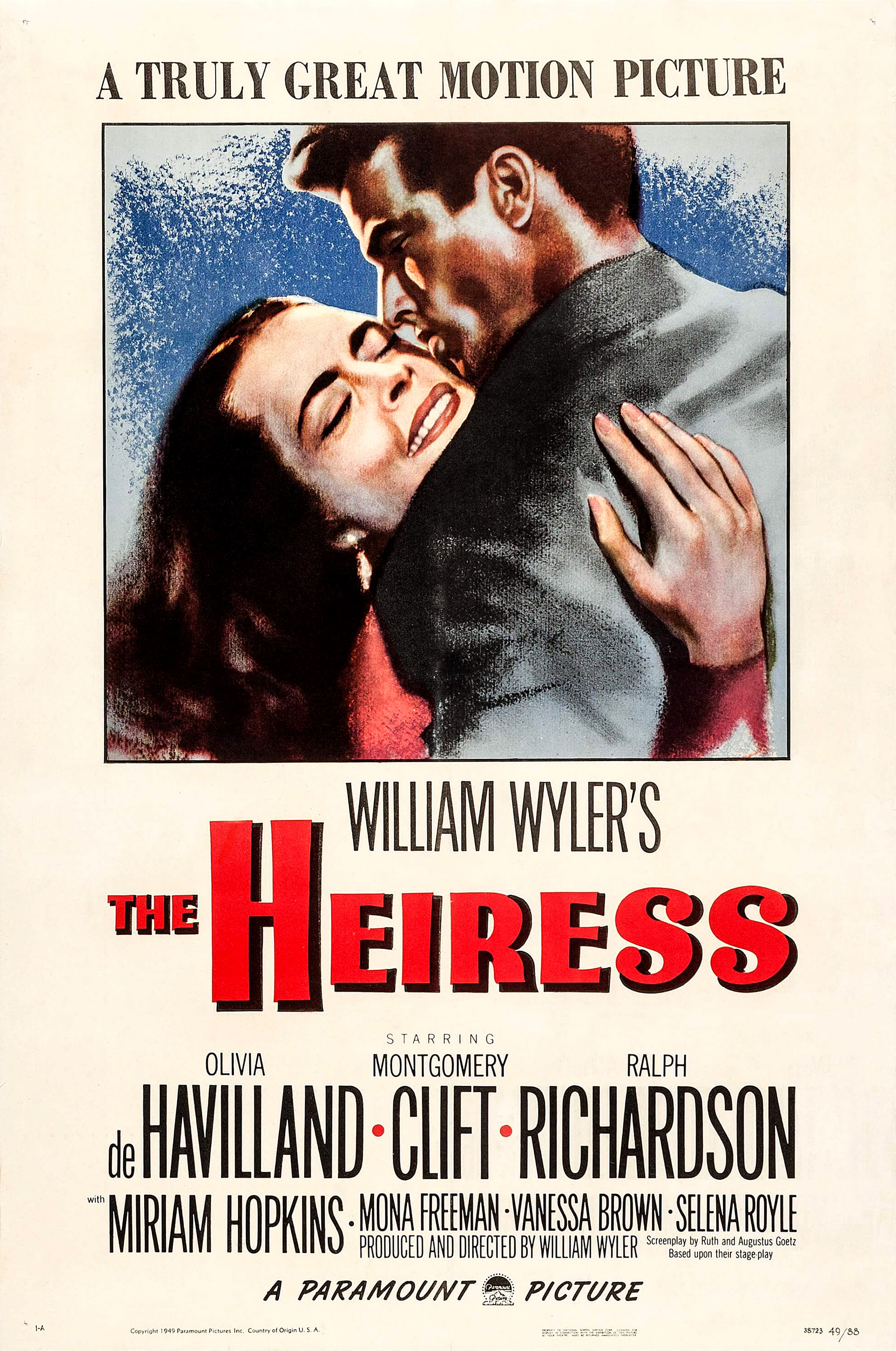
- Theatrical release poster
- Directed by: William Wyler
- Screenplay by: Augustus Goetz; Ruth Goetz
- Based on: The Heiress; 1947 play by Augustus Goetz; Ruth Goetz; Washington Square; 1880 novel by Henry James
- Produced by: William Wyler
- Starring: Olivia de Havilland; Montgomery Clift; Ralph Richardson
- Cinematography: Leo Tover
- Edited by: William Hornbeck
- Music by: Aaron Copland
- Color process: Black and white
- Production company: Paramount Pictures
- Distributed by: Paramount Pictures
- Release dates: October 6, 1949 (Premiere); December 28, 1949 (Wide release)
- Running time: 115 minutes
- Country: United States
- Language: English
- Budget: $2.6 million
- Box office: $2.3 million (US rentals)

The Heiress is a 1949 American romantic drama film directed and produced by William Wyler, from a screenplay written by Ruth and Augustus Goetz, adapted from their 1947 stage play of the same title, which was itself adapted from Henry James' 1880 novel Washington Square. The film stars Olivia de Havilland as Catherine Sloper, a naive young woman who falls in love with a handsome young man despite the objections of her emotionally abusive father who suspects the man of being a fortune hunter. Montgomery Clift stars as Morris Townsend and Ralph Richardson as Dr. Sloper.

The Heiress premiered in Los Angeles on October 6, 1949, and was theatrically released by Paramount Pictures on December 28, 1949. Although a box office failure, grossing $2.3 million on a $2.6 million budget, the film garnered critical acclaim, with reviewers praising Wyler's direction, its screenplay, and the performances of the cast. The film received a leading eight nominations at the 22nd Academy Awards, including for the Best Picture, and won four awards (more than any other film nominated that year): Best Actress (for de Havilland), Best Original Score, composed by Aaron Copland, Best Production Design, and Best Costume Design.

In 1996, The Heiress was selected for preservation in the United States National Film Registry by the Library of Congress as being "culturally, historically, or aesthetically significant."

Universal Pictures, through its EMKA division, currently handles distribution of the film.

== Plot ==
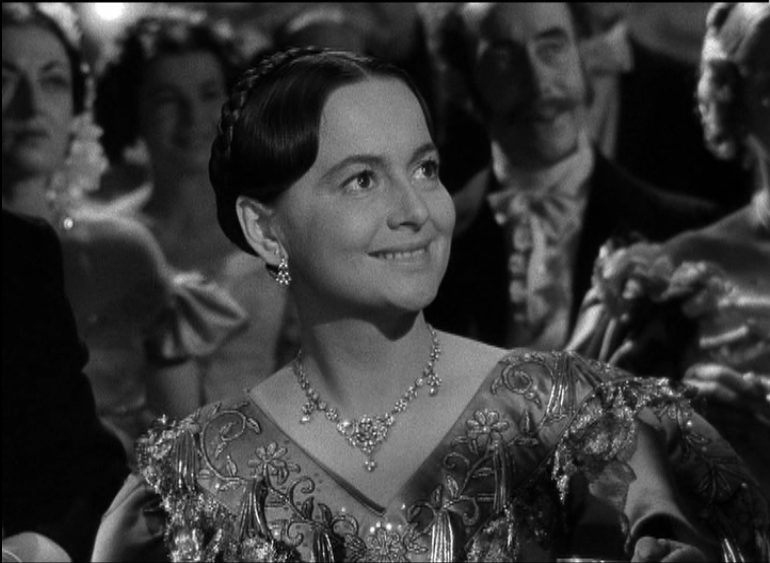
Olivia de Havilland as Catherine Sloper, a plain and shy young woman, who constantly disappoints her father with her lack of social graces.

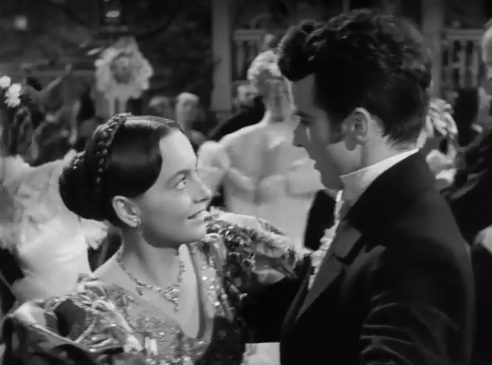
At a ball, Catherine meets Morris Townsend, a handsome and charming, but impoverished, young man who knows she is the heiress to a great fortune.

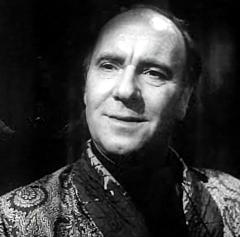
Ralph Richardson plays Doctor Austin Sloper, who threatens to disinherit Catherine if she marries a supected fortune hunter.

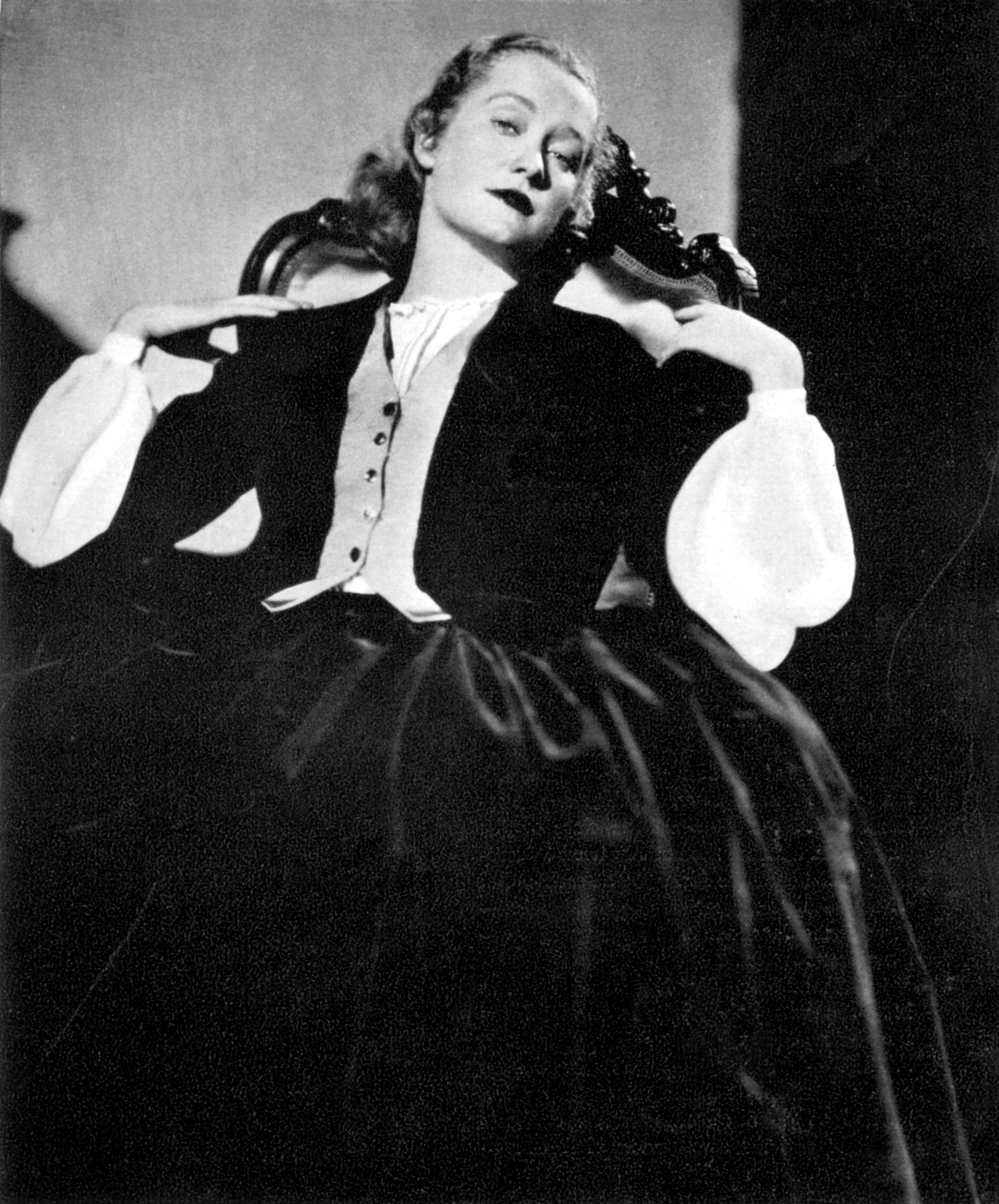
Miriam Hopkins plays Lavinia Penniman, Catherine's pragmatic and vivacious aunt, who suspects Morris' motivations aren't the purest, but still believes he is her niece's best chance at happiness.

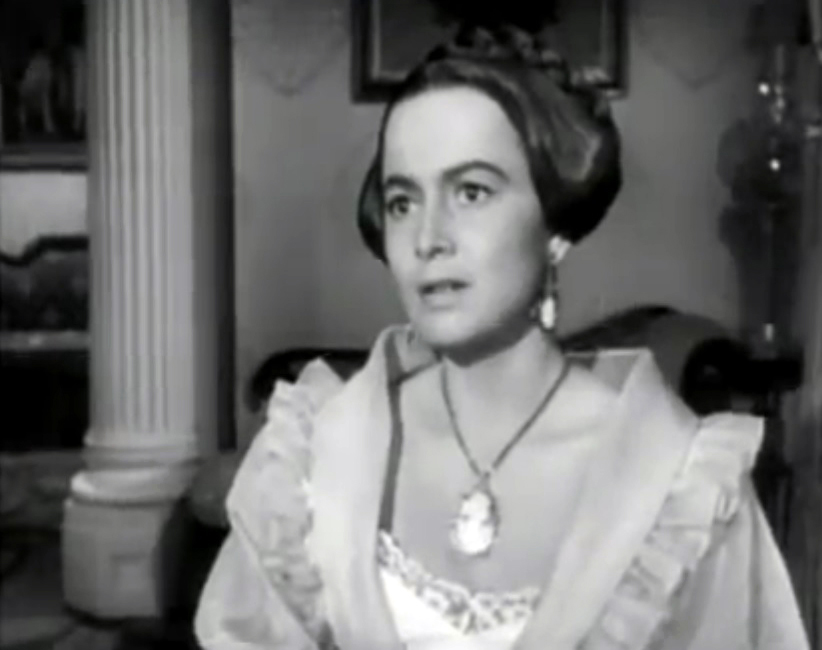
Years after having been abandoned, wealthy Catherine again is courted by Morris Townsend.

In 1849, in New York City, Catherine Sloper, the titular heiress, is a shy and reserved young woman living with her father, Dr. Austin Sloper, and his widowed sister, Lavinia Penniman, at Washington Square. Catherine's mother died in childbirth, and Dr. Sloper often compares his daughter unfavorably with her memory of her mother, whom he regarded as accomplished and socially admired. He views Catherine as lacking the qualities he valued in his late wife, creating tension in their relationship.

At a ball, Catherine meets the handsome young Morris Townsend. Aunt Penniman encourages the match on both sides, and Morris begins to pursue Catherine in earnest. Morris finds a certain charm to the clumsy Catherine's sincerity, and Catherine, overwhelmed by the attention and affection, falls deeply in love with him. Improperly, Morris extracts promises of loyalty from Catherine before getting permission from her father to marry.

Dr. Sloper is suspicious that anyone could love the daughter he sees as so unattractive and believes Morris is nothing but a conniving fortune hunter after Catherine's vast potential wealth. He finds Morris's widowed sister, who confirms that Morris squandered a small inheritance on a European Grand Tour, did not use any of the money to help her or her children, and has no further assets or employment prospects.

Sloper rejects the match with Morris. When Catherine persists, Sloper insists on taking her on an extended European trip to separate the pair as a test. Morris claims that he is loath to estrange Catherine from her father, and she should appease him by going on the trip and proving him wrong.

While Catherine and her father are away, Morris frequents the Sloper home and treats it as if he owns it already. In Europe, Dr. Sloper is disappointed that his plans have failed as Morris has not found a new heiress to target and Catherine has remained annoyingly and intransigently devoted to the idea of marrying Morris. Upon returning home, Dr. Sloper snaps at his excited daughter for being so stupid to believe that any handsome young man could possibly love her for anything but her money and threatens to disinherit her if she continues to insist on marrying Morris. Catherine is shocked by the maliciousness of her own father's true opinion of her.

Wanting to escape the oppressive house for a happy married life of love (and to spite her father and prove him wrong), Catherine begs Morris to arrange their immediate elopement, not wanting to spend another night in her father's home. Morris encourages her to change her mind, in the hopes that the two could eventually gain Dr. Sloper's approval (and keep her inheritance), but Catherine insists that even if her father relents, she will never accept anything from him again. Reluctantly, Morris agrees to elope and leaves to make arrangements.

Catherine waits with her bags packed, and Aunt Penniman stays with her, dismayed that Catherine revealed to Morris that there would be no money from her father, only the much-smaller, but still substantial, sum she already received from her mother. The appointed time comes and passes without his arrival: Catherine realizes that her father is right and Morris has abandoned her. She ascends the stairs in despair to unpack.

Days afterward, Dr. Sloper reveals he is dying and asks Catherine when she plans to leave with Morris. When Catherine admits that the elopement is off, Dr. Sloper expresses pride that Catherine has rejected Morris, but Catherine bitterly informs him that she was jilted. Catherine accuses her father of denying her even the chance to "buy" a husband to pretend to love her. She tells her father that if he leaves her his money, he will never know whether she wastes it on Morris or another fortune hunter. Hardened, Catherine refuses to come to his bedside as he dies. However, he could not bring himself to disinherit his own daughter, and Catherine comes into the full fortune.

Years later, wealthy, independent, and single, Catherine still lives in the Washington Square house with her aunt. She informs Catherine that Morris has returned from California and wishes to explain himself. Initially reluctant, Catherine eventually agrees to see him. Now destitute and newly appreciative of Catherine's qualities, Morris attempts to win Catherine back, saying that he left, selflessly, not to estrange her from her father. Catherine suggests they carry out the delayed elopement. Morris eagerly leaves to pack. When Morris returns to take her away, Catherine has bolted the door against him, leaving him desperately pounding on the door as she turns off the lights and goes to bed.

== Cast ==
- Olivia de Havilland as Catherine Sloper
- Montgomery Clift as Morris Townsend
- Ralph Richardson as Dr. Austin Sloper
- Miriam Hopkins as Lavinia Penniman
- Vanessa Brown as Mariah
- Betty Linley as Mrs. Montgomery
- Ray Collins as Jefferson Almond
- Mona Freeman as Marian Almond
- Selena Royle as Elizabeth Almond
- Paul Lees as Arthur Townsend
- Harry Antrim as Mr. Abeel
- Russ Conway as Quintus
- David Thursby as Geier

== Production ==
After seeing The Heiress on Broadway, Olivia de Havilland approached William Wyler about directing her in a screen adaptation of the play. He agreed and encouraged executives at Paramount Pictures to purchase the rights from the playwrights (Ruth and Augustus Goetz) for $250,000 and offer them $10,000 per week to write the screenplay. The couple were asked to make Morris less of a villain than he was in their play and the original novel in deference to the studio's desire to capitalize on Montgomery Clift's reputation as a romantic leading man.

The film premiered at Radio City Music Hall in New York City on October 6, 1949.

Ralph Richardson reprised the role of Austin Sloper in a London production of the play.

== Reception ==
The Heiress received universal critical acclaim. When it premiered at Radio City Music Hall, Bosley Crowther of The New York Times wrote that the film "crackles with allusive life and fire in its tender and agonized telling of an extraordinarily characterful tale" and added Wyler "has given this somewhat austere drama an absorbing intimacy and a warming illusion of nearness that it did not have on the stage. He has brought the full-bodied people very closely and vividly to view, while maintaining the clarity and sharpness of their personalities, their emotions and their styles... The Heiress is one of the handsome, intense and adult dramas of the year." Currently, the film holds a perfect 100% approval rating with an average rating of 9.0/10 on the review aggregation website Rotten Tomatoes based on 14 reviews.

Pauline Kael wrote, "[At] first the period settings and clothes may make the movie seem a little heavy and stagey, but then Wyler's mastery of the psychological nuances can have you drawing deep breaths. It's a peerless, super-controlled movie, in the same mode as Wyler's 1952 Carrie, though more fully sustained. Wyler's greatness here is that he can hold the elements of the film in his palm without constricting the actors. He frees them."

The Brooklyn Eagle found the film "an intensely satisfying drama that holds a high level of interest throughout, building relentlessly to a moving climax." Praise for the principals lauded de Havilland especially: "[The] transformation of Catherine Sloper from a pathetically shy girl to a cold, handsome woman" being "handled with finished skill."

The Philadelphia Inquirer praised the Goetzes for a skillful transformation of their stage version, finding it "in almost every way...superior." Prospects of an Academy Award for de Havilland were judged "thoroughly reasonable" as well.

TV Guide rates the film five out of a possible five stars and adds, "This powerful and compelling drama...owes its triumph to the deft hand of director William Wyler and a remarkable lead performance by Olivia de Havilland".

Time Out London calls the film "typically plush, painstaking and cold...highly professional and heartless."

Channel 4 stated, "[De Havilland's] portrayal...is spine-chilling...Clift brings a subtle ambiguity to one of his least interesting roles, and Richardson is also excellent."

== Influence ==
Martin Scorsese has cited The Heiress as a key influence on his 2023 film Killers of the Flower Moon. Specifically, the portrayal of Mollie Kyle and her relationship with her husband Ernest Burkhart drew inspiration from de Havilland's portrayal of Catherine and her relationship with Morris.

== In popular culture ==
In 1975, the twenty-first episode of the eighth season of The Carol Burnett Show featured a takeoff of the film titled "The Lady Heir," with Carol Burnett as Catherine and Roddy McDowall as Morris.

== Awards and nominations ==
Award	Category	Nominee(s)	Result
Academy Awards	Best Picture	William Wyler	Nominated
Academy Awards	Best Director	William Wyler	Nominated
Academy Awards	Best Actress	Olivia de Havilland	Won
Academy Awards	Best Supporting Actor	Ralph Richardson	Nominated
Academy Awards	Best Art Direction-Set Decoration – Black-and-White	John Meehan, Harry Horner and Emile Kuri	Won
Academy Awards	Best Cinematography – Black-and-White	Leo Tover	Nominated
Academy Awards	Best Costume Design – Black and White	Edith Head and Gile Steele	Won
Academy Awards	Best Scoring of a Dramatic or Comedy Picture	Aaron Copland	Won
Golden Globe Awards	Best Actress in a Motion Picture	Olivia de Havilland	Won
Golden Globe Awards	Best Supporting Actress – Motion Picture	Miriam Hopkins	Nominated
Golden Globe Awards	Best Director – Motion Picture	William Wyler	Nominated
National Board of Review Awards	Top Ten Films		4th Place
National Board of Review Awards	Best Actor	Ralph Richardson (also for The Fallen Idol)	Won
National Film Preservation Board	National Film Registry		Inducted
New York Film Critics Circle Awards	Best Actor	Ralph Richardson	Nominated
New York Film Critics Circle Awards	Best Actress	Olivia de Havilland	Won
Writers Guild of America Awards	Best Written American Drama	Ruth Goetz and August Goetz	Nominated

== See also ==
- Gothic romance film
- The Heiress essay by Daniel Eagan in America's Film Legacy: The Authoritative Guide to the Landmark Movies in the National Film Registry, A&C Black, 2010 ISBN 0826429777, pages 426–427
