= Rhythm Parade =

1942 film by Howard Bretherton

- Directed by: Howard Bretherton and David Gould
- Written by: Carol Forman and Charles R. Marion
- Starring: Gale Storm
- Distributed by: Monogram Pictures
- Release date: December 11, 1942
- Running time: 68 Minutes
- Country: United States
- Language: English

Rhythm Parade is a 1942 American musical comedy film starring Gale Storm and Margaret Dumont.

Carl Foreman wrote the original story. Yvonne De Carlo makes an early appearance.

== Cast ==
- Nils Granlund as himself, Nils T. "Granny" Granlund aka N.T.G.
- Gale Storm as Sally Benson
- Robert Lowery as Jimmy Trent
- Margaret Dumont as Ophelia MacDougal
- The Mills Brothers as themselves
- Ted Fio Rito as Orchestra leader
- Candy Candedo as Candy
- Chick Chandler as Speed
- Cliff Nazarro as Rocks MacDougal
- Jan Wiley as Connie

== Home media ==
The film was released on DVD on September 25, 2018.
