= Amanda Foreman (historian) =

American historian

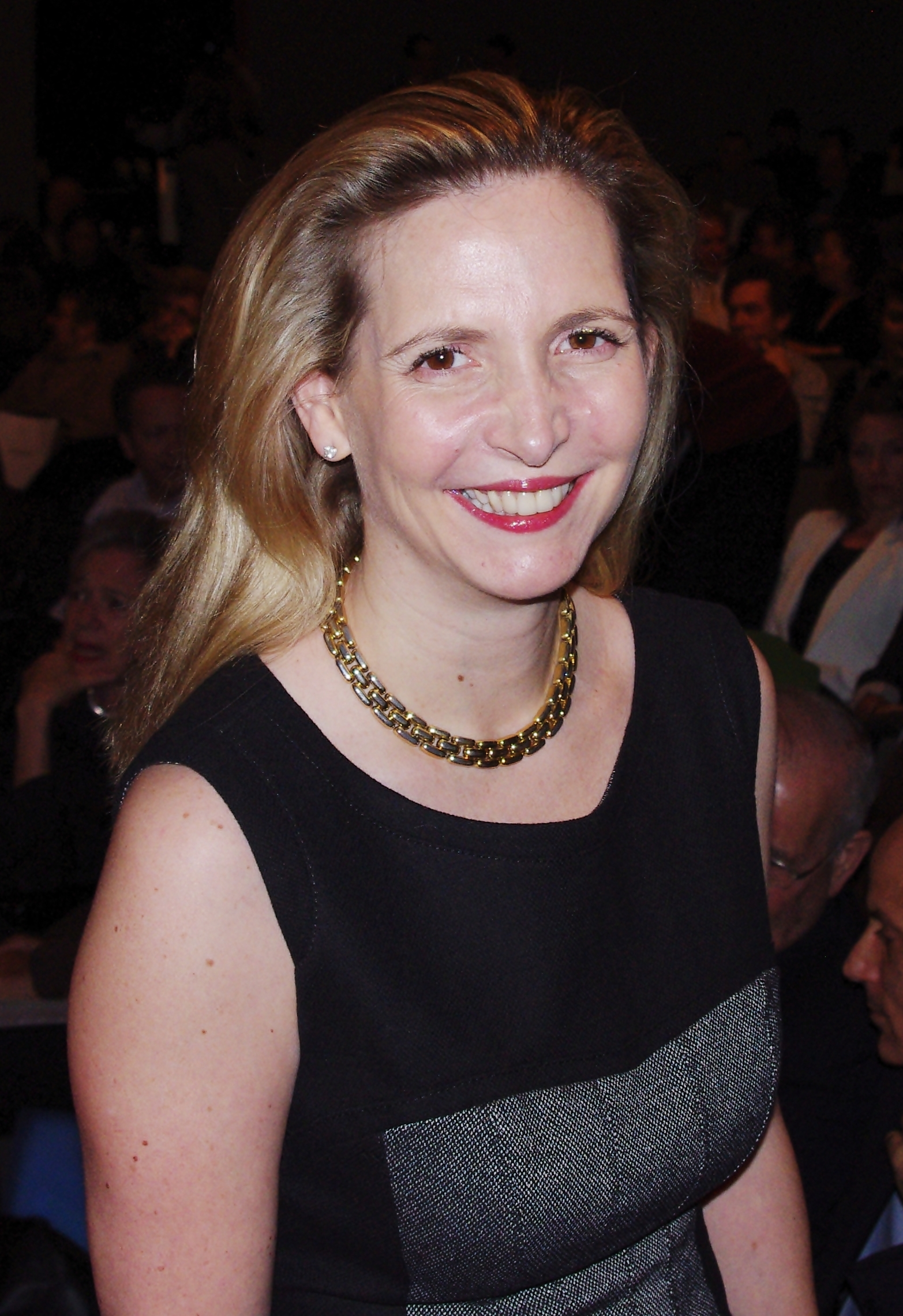
- Foreman in 2012
- Born: Amanda Lucy Foreman; 1968 (age 57–58); London, England
- Citizenship: British, American
- Education: Sarah Lawrence College; Columbia University; Lady Margaret Hall, Oxford
- Occupations: Writer, academic
- Spouse: Jonathan Barton
- Children: 5
- Parents: Carl Foreman (father); Evelyn Smith (mother)
- Relatives: Jonathan Foreman (brother)
- Writing career
- Subject: 18th century British history

Amanda Lucy Foreman (born 1968) is a British-American biographer and historian. Her books include Georgiana, Duchess of Devonshire, A World on Fire: Britain's Crucial Role in the American Civil War, and the forthcoming The World Made by Women. She also wrote and starred in a four-part documentary regarding the role of women in society, entitled The Ascent of Woman. Foreman's column for The Wall Street Journal bi-weekly 'Historically Speaking' ran for over ten years. She is also a CBS News royal contributor.

== Early life and education ==
Foreman was born in London. Her parents were Evelyn (Smith) and the screenwriter and film producer Carl Foreman. Her father moved to England to work after being blacklisted by the Hollywood movie studios during the McCarthyism of the 1950s. Her brother, Jonathan Foreman, is an international correspondent and film critic. She has five children and is married to Jonathan Barton.

Amanda Foreman was educated at Hanford School, a girls' junior independent school in southwest England, followed by various girls' boarding schools. She attended Sarah Lawrence College in Yonkers, New York, then Columbia University, before returning to England in 1991. She was awarded a 1993 Henrietta Jex-Blake Senior Scholarship at Lady Margaret Hall, Oxford. At Oxford, Foreman completed an MPhil thesis Politics or Providence?: Why the Houses of Parliament voted to abolish the slave trade in 1807 (1993) and a DPhil with her thesis The political life of Georgiana, Duchess of Devonshire, 1757–1806 (1998) which was then turned into her first biography. She received her doctorate from Oxford University in 18th Century British History.

== Career ==
=== Georgiana, Duchess of Devonshire ===
After completing her DPhil, Foreman remained at Oxford as a researcher, and in 1998 she published her first book, Georgiana, Duchess of Devonshire, based on her doctoral thesis. Published by HarperCollins in the UK and Random House in the US, the book was an international best-seller and reached number one in the UK as a hardback, paperback, and reissue nine years later. It was shortlisted for the 1998 Guardian First Book Award, and won the 1998 Whitbread Prize for Best Biography. The book has been the subject of a television documentary, a radio play starring Judi Dench, and a film, The Duchess, starring Ralph Fiennes and Keira Knightley.

=== A World on Fire ===
Foreman's most recent book, A World on Fire: Britain's Crucial Role in the American Civil War, a history of British-American relations in the American Civil War, was published by Penguin in the UK in 2010 and by Random House in the US in 2011. The book was a critical success in both countries and a national best-seller in the US. Writing in The Guardian, Jay Parini stated, "One can hardly overestimate the brilliance of Foreman's conception, seeing this turning point in American history from a British viewpoint, drawing on a vast range of actors on this great stage, including lesser-known British sympathisers who fought on either side in this conflict or journalists." Adam I. P. Smith of History Today said, "Amanda Foreman's magnificent new book . . . resembles nothing so much as War and Peace." In a rare accolade, The New York Times Book Review awarded Foreman her second cover review. Michael Burlingame in The Wall Street Journal heralded Foreman as "such an engaging writer that readers may find this 958-page volume too short". Hendrik Hertzberg of The New Yorker wrote, "The pages fly like the wind — like Gone with the Wind — because there's so much life, so much action, and so many vivid people in them."

In 2011, A World on Fire was "highly commended" by the judges of the PEN Hessell-Tiltman Prize. It was chosen as a "Book of the Year" by The New Yorker and The Economist and named one of the "Ten Best Books of 2011" by The New York Times, Bloomberg, The Washington Post, the Chicago Tribune, and NPR.

In 2012, A World on Fire won the Fletcher Pratt Award for excellence in Civil War history writing. It was a finalist for the 2012 Lincoln Prize, the Lionel Gelber Prize, and the National Book Critics Circle Award. It was also nominated for the Jefferson Davis Prize.

=== The Ascent of Woman ===
In September 2015, The Ascent of Woman, Foreman's acclaimed four-part documentary regarding the role of women in society, was first aired on BBC 2. The series received positive reviews, with The Telegraph calling it "powerful, inspiring, and important."

The series was subsequently programmed on Netflix in 2016.

=== The World Made by Women ===
Foreman's next book, The World Made by Women: A History of Women from the Apple to the Pill, is slated for publication by Penguin Random House (US) and Allen Lane (UK) in 2026.

=== Queen Victoria's Palace ===
In 2018, twenty-five years after Queen Elizabeth II opened Buckingham Palace to the public during the summer months, Royal Collection Trust set a new precedent by inviting an outsider, Foreman, to curate an exhibition for the 2019 Buckingham Palace Summer Opening.

'Queen Victoria's Palace' opened on 18 July 2019. The exhibition, which coincided with the 200th anniversary of Queen Victoria's birth, argued that Victoria's transformation of Buckingham Palace laid the foundations for the modern Monarchy. The refurbished Palace reflected a new form of gendered power. Victoria replaced the 'male' values of glory, wealth, lineage, and conquest with the 'female' values of family, duty, patriotism, and public service. "These four "female" virtues formed the pillars not only of her reign but of every one that followed".

The show delighted the public and critics. Singled out was Foreman's introduction of modern technology, including holograms and CGI projections on walls and ceilings, to enhance the exhibition experience. The Guardian newspaper reported: "The story of how Victoria and Prince Albert rebuilt the palace into the most glittering court in Europe is explored through paintings, sketches and costumes, and includes a Hollywood-produced immersive experience that brings to life the balls for which she was famous."

Foreman also co-wrote a book to accompany the exhibition, 'Queen Victoria's Palace'.

=== Other ===
In addition to her work as a historian and biographer, Amanda Foreman also writes for radio, television and print media. Her work is spread across a broad range, and includes a meditation on the role of the historian for BBC Radio 3, a documentary series on the Georgians, 1714–1832, for BBC Radio 4, a discussion of the Anglo-American relationship for Andrew Neil's This Week on BBC One, cover interviews with Emma Watson and Keira Knightley for Vogue, profiles of Hillary Clinton and Nancy Pelosi for Porter, and a cover story on Margaret Thatcher for Newsweek in December 2011. Foreman has also written for both The Sunday Times Magazine and The Lady in the UK. She is also a passionate advocate for freedom of speech and has written about the subject for many publications. In addition to freedom of speech, Foreman has campaigned on a variety of other issues, from justice for Jean McConville to gender equality. In 2016, Foreman received the St. George's Society of New York's Anglo-American Cultural Award, which recognizes individuals who have made significant contributions to the US-UK cultural world. She was also an Honorary Research Senior Fellow in the History Department at the University of Liverpool.

In 2013, Foreman founded the House of SpeakEasy, a literary nonprofit organization based in New York City that brings authors and their audiences together in innovative and entertaining ways. The organization hosts a series of acclaimed literary cabarets in New York City, where writers are invited to speak informally on the evening's theme. Past participants include Salman Rushdie, Susan Minot, Jeff Kinney (author), Elif Şafak, and Yusef Komunyakaa. House of SpeakEasy also operates several community outreach programs under the umbrella name Seriously Involved. SpeakFreely provides free tickets to teachers and writing students to come to the shows put on by Seriously Entertaining. SpeakTogether works with Union Settlement in East Harlem, bringing writers together with senior high school students in Union Settlement's college readiness initiative. John Guare, Susan Cheever, David Gilbert (author), Michael Jan Friedman and Lemon Andersen are among the writers who have taken part in the program.

Foreman has served as a judge on the Guardian First Book Award (1999), the Orange Prize for Fiction (2000), the National Book Award (2010), the Cheltenham Booker Prize (2011), the Dan David Prize (2012), the Pen Hessell-Tiltman Prize (2012), and the Man Booker Prize (2012). Most recently, she was appointed chair of the Man Booker Prize (2016).

In 2013, Foreman began writing "Historically Speaking", a biweekly column on history and world affairs, for The Wall Street Journal. Historically Speaking ran for over ten years. Amanda has also been a columnist for the Smithsonian magazine and The Sunday Times.

Amanda is the chair of the Feminist Institute and is a trustee of the Whiting Foundation. She is on the board of Americans For Oxford, International Friends of the London Library, and is on the executive board for the Society of American Historians.

== Books ==
- Foreman, Amanda. The World Made by Women: A History of Women from the Apple to the Pill. ISBN 1846147409 Forthcoming.
- Foreman, Amanda. A World on Fire: An Epic History of Two Nations Divided (Penguin, 2010), 988 pp. ISBN 1-846-14204-0 OCLC 640084044 Reissued as A World on Fire: Britain's Crucial Role in the American Civil War
- Foreman, Amanda. The Duchess (Random House, 2008), 456 pp. ISBN 0812979699 OCLC 234316192 Originally published as Georgiana: Duchess of Devonshire.
- Foreman, Amanda. Georgiana, Duchess of Devonshire (Random House, 2001), 512 pp. ISBN 0-375-50294-7 OCLC 41278384 Another ed. was published By HarperCollins in 2000.
- Foreman, Amanda. Georgiana's World: The Illustrated Georgiana, Duchess of Devonshire. London: HarperCollins, 2001. ISBN 0-007-12276-4 OCLC 48782725

== Essays ==
Dr. Amanda Foreman has contributed essays and introductions for:

- Exploring Lincoln: Great Historians Reappraise Our Greatest President edited by Harold Holzer, Craig L. Symonds, and Frank J. Williams

"Lincoln's Emancipation Proclamation: A Propaganda Tool for the Enemy?” by Amanda Foreman

- The Civil War as Global Conflict: Transnational Meanings of the American Civil War edited by David T. Gleeson and Simon Lewis

"Coda: Roundtable on Memory" by Amanda Foreman

- Greenwich Village Stories: A Collection of Memories edited by Judith Stonehill

"Greenwich Village" by Amanda Foreman

- The New York Times' Disunion: Modern Historians Revisit and Reconsider the Civil War from Lincoln's Election to the Emancipation Proclamation edited by Ted Widmer

"How to Lose Allies and Alienate People" by Amanda Foreman

- City Parks: Public Spaces, Private Thoughts edited by Catie Marron

"Hyde Park, London" by Amanda Foreman

- Reconfiguring the Union: Civil War Transformations edited by Iwan W. Morgan and Philip John Davies Palgrave

"Lincoln's Emancipation Proclamation: A Propaganda Tool for the Enemy?” by Amanda Foreman

- George IV by Christopher Hibbert, foreword by Amanda Foreman ISBN 9781403983794
- What Might Have Been?: Leading Historians on Twelve 'What Ifs' of History edited by Andrew Roberts

"The Trent Incident Leads to War" by Amanda Foreman

- The Sylph - by Georgiana Duchess of Devonshire, foreword by Amanda Foreman
- Madame de Pompadour by Nancy Mitford, foreword by Amanda Foreman
- Gender in Eighteenth Century England: Roles, Representations and Responsibilities edited by Hannah Barker and Elaine Chalus

"A politician's politician: Georgiana, Duchess of Devonshire and the Whig party" by Amanda Foreman

== Lectures ==
- The Chalke Valley History Festival – 28 June 2015

From Empress Wu Zeitan to Margaret Thatcher explored their role from the Palaeolithic era to Britain today, revealing their extraordinary and often overlooked impact in the forging of the modern world.

- Surrounded on All Sides – Five Lessons in Leadership From History, 11 June 2013, the Sydney Institute.
- "Lincoln's Emancipation Proclamation in England: A Propaganda Tool for the Enemy?” – 26 March 2011 – was a program of the 14th Annual Abraham Lincoln Institute Symposium, “The Latest in Lincoln Scholarship,” sponsored by the Abraham Lincoln Institute and the Foundation for the National Archives at the National Archives at College Park.

Dr. Amanda Foreman talked about the international response to the Civil War, particularly by Great Britain, in her speech.

- A World on Fire: Britain's Crucial Role in the American Civil War – 30 November 2011 – The New York Society Library

== Awards ==
Awards:

- 2012 Fletcher Pratt Award for excellence in Civil War history writing.
- 1998 Whitbread Prize for Best Biography.
- 1993 Henrietta Jex-Blake Senior Fellowship, Lady Margaret Hall, Oxford

Finalist:

- 2012 Lincoln Prize
- 2012 Lionel Gelber Prize
- 2012 National Book Critics Circle Award
- 2011 Jefferson Davis Award
- 2010 PEN/Hessell-Tiltman History Prize
- 1998 Guardian First Book Award

== Personal life ==
Foreman has dual citizenship, and splits her time between New York City, Kinderhook, New York, and London.

She is an Honorary Research Senior Fellow in the Department of History at The University of Liverpool.

Besides her professional life, Foreman is very fond of gardening.

== Sources ==
- 'Reassessing Georgiana a decade later', Sunday Times, August, 2008
- 'Life as working mother of Five', Sunday Times, February, 2007
- 'The Queen of Historical Biography', The Independent, October, 2010
- 'Interview with Amanda Foreman', The Daily Telegraph, November, 2010
