= Bowery Blitzkrieg =

1941 film by Wallace Fox

- Bowery Blitzkrieg DVD Cover
- Directed by: Wallace Fox
- Written by: Brendan Wood; Donn Mullahy; Sam Robins; Carl Foreman
- Produced by: Sam Katzman
- Starring: Leo Gorcey; Bobby Jordan; Keye Luke
- Cinematography: Marcel Le Picard
- Edited by: Robert Golden
- Music by: Johnny Lange; Lew Porter
- Production company: Sam Katzman Productions
- Distributed by: Monogram Pictures
- Release date: August 1, 1941
- Running time: 62 minutes
- Country: United States
- Language: English

Bowery Blitzkrieg is a 1941 American comedy film directed by Sam Katzman. It is the sixth installment of the East Side Kids series. The film "introduced" Huntz Hall in his first of the East Side Kids film series.

It was released in the United Kingdom under the title Stand and Deliver.

== Plot ==
Two police officers patrolling the streets of New York City's Bowery discuss the lamentable fact that most of the young boys in the neighborhood will turn to crime and end up in jail. One exception, they agree, is Danny Breslin, a young boxer who is studying economics and destined for success. While Danny's future looks bright, the future of his former best friend, Muggs McGinnis, appears to hold little more than troubles with the law and juvenile probation.

One day, when Danny learns that Muggs has been speaking poorly of his schoolteacher sister Mary, he marches over to Clancy's Pool Hall, their favorite neighborhood haunt, and punches Muggs. The fight eventually turns into a pool hall riot, which results in Muggs's arrest. Officer Tom Brady, Mary's sweetheart, believes that many of the boys can be reformed, and when he learns that Muggs has been involved in another fight, he tries to enlist Danny's help in determining the reason behind Muggs' propensity to fight. Danny surprises his mother, sister and Tom when he violently protests Tom's request, saying that he hates "coppers," and vows never to return to the police gym for his boxing practice.

While Tom lays plans to reform Muggs by entering him as a fighter in the upcoming Golden Glove Tournament, Danny unwittingly gets involved with notorious thug Monk Martin. Unknown to Danny, Monk has used him to drive his getaway car in a grocery store holdup. After paying Danny for his "services," Monk manages to persuade him to quit school and join his racket. Meanwhile, Muggs, having made great strides at the Whitney reform school, goes to live with Tom and his mother, much to the dismay of Mary, who promptly breaks off her relationship with Tom.

Muggs eventually wins the respect of the entire neighborhood and earns the police department's sponsorship of his fight in the Golden Glove Tournament. So completely has Muggs given up his delinquent ways that he curses Monk when the racketeer offers him $1,000 to take a fall in the tournament fight.

Later, after overhearing Tom's mother blaming his arrival for the break-up of Tom and Mary's relationship, Muggs becomes despondent and decides to move out. Just before the fight, crooked fight promoter Slats Morrison plants the intended bribery money in Muggs's gear and tries to frame him. Danny, meanwhile, is wounded by Tom as he and Monk are caught fleeing from a robbery. Hospitalized and in desperate need of blood, Danny's life hangs in the balance until Muggs volunteers his blood and saves his best friend. Mary has a change of heart and returns to Tom, and Tom announces that Monk made a full confession before dying. Danny's family gathers around a radio and listens with pride as Muggs knocks out his opponent at the tournament. Following the fight, Slats and his boss Dorgan are arrested, and Tom and Mary look forward to their wedding.

== Cast ==
=== The East Side Kids ===
- Leo Gorcey as Muggs McGinnis
- Bobby Jordan as Danny Breslin
- Huntz Hall as Limpy
- Donald Haines as Skinny
- Ernie "Sunshine Sammy" Morrison as Scruno
- David Gorcey as Peewee

=== Additional cast ===
- Bobby Stone as Monk Martin
- Keye Luke (billed as Key Luke) as Clancy
- Warren Hull as Tom Brady
- Charlotte Henry as Mary Breslin
- Martha Wentworth as Mrs. Brady
- Jack Mulhall as Officer Sherrill
- Eddie Foster as Slats Morrison
- Dennis Moore as Dorgan
- Tony Carson as Dutch
- Pat Costello as Fight Coach
- Dick Ryan as The Precinct Lieutenant
- Jack Carr (uncredited) as George, Truck Driver
- Bill Cartledge (uncredited) as Johnny Ryan, Boxer
- John Indrisano (uncredited) as Referee
- George Urecal (uncredited) as Nick
- Minerva Urecal (uncredited) as Reform School Matron

== Production ==
Huntz Hall's first East Side Kids film. Hall receives a special credit ("Introducing Huntz Hall"). Around the same time, Hall had been working in Universal's Dead End Kids and Little Tough Guys series, alongside other former Dead End Kids. During this period, Hall would be performing in both the Universal series, and Monogram's East Side Kids series. While Hall's character would be called "Glimpy" for the remainder of the series, here he's called "Limpy".

Bowery Blitzkrieg was filmed between June 1941 and July 1941.

== See also ==
- List of boxing films
