= Jonathan Foreman (journalist) =

British journalist (born 1965)

Jonathan Foreman (born 1965) is an Anglo-American journalist and film critic.

== Biography ==
He is the son of Academy-Award winning screenwriter and film producer Carl Foreman, who moved to England to work after being blacklisted by Hollywood movie studio bosses during the McCarthy era. He is the elder brother of the best-selling biographer Amanda Foreman.

Foreman was born in London and educated at St Paul's School. He then studied Modern History at Gonville and Caius College, Cambridge. After working as an editorial assistant for the International Herald Tribune, Foreman received his JD degree from the University of Pennsylvania Law School. He became a member of the New York Bar in 1991 and worked for the Manhattan firm, Shearman and Sterling. After several years at the bar, he described his decision to leave the law in a widely cited critique of New York City company culture, for the magazine City Journal.

Foreman then travelled widely in Asia, winning the South Asian Journalists Association first prize for reporting in 1997 for the City Journal piece, "Bombay on the Hudson". He won another prize from the same group in 2009 for his article in the National Review, "The Real Bhutto: Against the Mythmaking". On his return to New York, Foreman wrote another article for City Journal that was cited by then New York Mayor Rudy Giuliani as the inspiration for the "quality of life" law enforcement efforts enacted in his second term in office.

In April 1998 Foreman joined the New York Post and soon became its film critic. He served as Chairman of the New York Critics Circle, stepping down in 2004. On the outbreak of the Iraq war Foreman was sent by the New York Post to report from Iraq. Embedded with the US Army's 3rd Infantry Division in Kuwait at the beginning of March, he arrived in Baghdad a day after the city's fall, and reported from there until the beginning of June. He had a global scoop with his report of the discovery of $320 million in cash in a West Baghdad garden shed, and a second one with his report that some of this money was subsequently stolen by GIs. While embedded with the army, Foreman wrote an article for the Weekly Standard in which he wrote that most Western press coverage of the conditions in Baghdad portrayed conditions as much worse than they really were. On the strength of his Iraq coverage, the Post subsequently sent him to cover the California recall election of October 2003.

Foreman returned to London in 2004. After several years with The Daily Mail, Foreman co-founded the British magazine Standpoint, launched in May 2008. Foreman left the staff of the magazine a few months after its launch but continued to write for it.

Foreman's work has appeared in publications including The New Yorker, The National Review, The London Daily Telegraph, The Weekly Standard, City Journal, the National Law Journal, Los Angeles and Spy. He is the author of The Pocket Book of Patriotism.

== Bibliography ==
- 2005 The Pocket Book of Patriotism, Sterling Publishers
