= So This Is New York =

1948 film by Richard Fleischer

- Theatrical release poster
- Directed by: Richard Fleischer
- Written by: Carl Foreman; Herbert Baker
- Based on: Big Town: How I and the Mrs. Go to New York to See Life and Get Katie a Husband; 1925 novel by Ring Lardner
- Produced by: Stanley Kramer
- Starring: Henry Morgan; Rudy Vallée; Hugh Herbert; Bill Goodwin; Leo Gorcey; Jerome Cowan; Dave Willock; Virginia Grey; Dona Drake; Arnold Stang
- Cinematography: John L. Russell
- Edited by: Walter Thompson
- Music by: Dimitri Tiomkin
- Production company: Enterprise Productions
- Distributed by: Metro-Goldwyn Mayer
- Release date: 1948
- Running time: 79 minutes
- Country: United States
- Language: English

So This Is New York is a 1948 American satirical comedy film starring Henry Morgan and directed by Richard Fleischer. The cynically sophisticated screenplay was written by Carl Foreman and Herbert Baker from the 1920 novel The Big Town by Ring Lardner; Foreman was blacklisted soon after. It remains the only film in which Morgan plays the leading role, and the material was tailored to showcase the cynical persona he had developed for his radio show.

The film was the second feature directed by Fleischer, who had previously directed short subjects for United Artists. Fleischer went on to direct Follow Me Quietly (1948), Armored Car Robbery (1950), and The Narrow Margin (1954). It was also the first film produced by Stanley Kramer.

== Plot ==
At the end of World War I, Ella Goff Finch and her sister Kate Goff inherit $30,000 each. Ella then announces her dissatisfaction with life in South Bend, Indiana, and with Kate's butcher/boyfriend Willis Gilbey. She is convinced she can find Kate a rich husband in New York City. Ella's wisecracking cigar salesman/husband Ernie is unable to change her mind, so he reluctantly accompanies the pair east—which is not a bad idea, considering his wife almost immediately becomes victim to Francis Griffin, a wolf in stockbroker's clothing.

In New York, the Finches find a spacious apartment and meet their wealthy neighbor, Lucius Trumbull, who invites them over for drinks. Ella is delighted, but not Kate. After all, Trumbull is approaching retirement age. Later, the trio encounter Herbert Daley, a Southern-gentleman racehorse owner. But Kate sets her sights on Daley's jockey, Sid Mercer, who reciprocates in kind. But Daley subsequently regains the inside track, and he and Kate become engaged. A drunk and embittered Sid plots his revenge. He confides to Ernie that Daley has conspired to fix the next day's race, but Sid will double cross his employer by ensuring a longshot wins. Sid's plot succeeds. When last seen, Daley is running for his life, his co-conspirators in hot pursuit. Meanwhile, Ernie, having profited off a bet on the longshot, accidentally runs into his employer A. J. Gluskoter and is summarily fired.

The Finches are thus forced to move to a seedy theatrical hotel, where they meet Ziegfeld Follies star and comedian Jimmy Ralston. He reveals his ambition is to write, produce, and star in a serious play. Ignoring Ernie's objections, Kate and Ella invest what's left of their inheritance. The play premieres to audience ridicule, and the critics pronounce it a flop. Ernie is unconcerned since he still has the money he won at the races. But Ella reveals she found his stash and invested it too. Fortunately, Gluskoter, experiencing a change of heart, miraculously appears and offers him his job back. In the end, they all happily return to South Bend, wiser for the experience.

== Cast ==
- Henry Morgan as Ernie Finch
- Rudy Vallée as Herbert Daley
- Bill Goodwin as Jimmy Ralston
- Hugh Herbert as Lucius Trumbull
- Leo Gorcey as Sid Mercer
- Virginia Grey as Ella Goff Finch
- Dona Drake as Kate Goff
- Jerome Cowan as Francis Griffin
- Dave Willock as Willis Gilbey
- Frank Orth as A. J. Gluskoter
- Arnold Stang as Western Union Clerk
- William Bakewell as Hotel Clerk

== Production ==
Stanley Kramer and Carl Foreman borrowed Richard Fleischer from RKO after they saw his debut feature, Child of Divorce.

The film was made on a small budget, "a little more than $600,000 ... cobbled together from several small-time non-Hollywood investors, including a dry goods salesman and a lettuce grower".

So This Is New York was one of the first Hollywood movies to use the technique of freezing action on the screen while the narrator, Henry Morgan, spoke about what the viewer was seeing. One scene has Ernie Finch (Morgan) entering a taxi as a cabbie barks at him in a thick Bronx accent, "Awrite - where to, Mac?" Subtitles appear on the screen translating, "Where may I take you, sir?"

== Reception ==
Although the film was not successful when first released, it is now "a favorite of many film buffs and critics". In his review of the film at AllMovie, critic Hal Erickson noted that although "movies were not the ideal medium for the satiric barbs of Henry Morgan, [...] he plays his role well and carries the film with assurance." Writing in DVD Talk, critic Matt Hinrichs described the film as an "amusing, ahead-of-its-time 1948 satire," adding that "although it tends to wear out its welcome too soon, this well-cast 'gold-digging in the big city' tale will be a welcome sight for fans of offbeat comedy." A review of the film at Film Intuition described it as a "sardonic satirical version of the novel The Big Town," noted that "perhaps the most inventive contribution Fleischer made was as an early pioneer of extended freeze frames in what can arguably be considered a mainstream Avant-garde work," and concluded that "despite its auspicious and technically creative merits it’s best remembered more as an early stepping stone taken by the cast and crew to get to the next phase of their career."

When the Tribeca Film Festival decided to include a Stanley Kramer film, noted director Martin Scorsese surprised Kramer's widow Karen Sharpe by requesting So This Is New York, rather than any of his better known works.
