= Boys of the City =

1940 film by Joseph H. Lewis

- Theatrical poster
- Directed by: Joseph H. Lewis
- Written by: William Lively
- Based on: story by William Lively
- Produced by: Sam Katzman
- Starring: Bobby Jordan; Leo Gorcey
- Cinematography: Robert E. Cline; Harvey Gould
- Edited by: Carl Pierson
- Music by: Lew Porter
- Production company: Four Bell Pictures Inc
- Distributed by: Monogram Pictures Corporation
- Release date: July 15, 1940 (U.S.)
- Running time: 68 minutes
- Country: United States

Boys of the City (also known as The Ghost Creeps) is a 1940 black-and-white comedy/thriller film directed by Joseph H. Lewis. It is the second East Side Kids film and the first to star Bobby Jordan, Leo Gorcey, and Ernest Morrison.

== Plot ==
To escape the heat of the city and a court sentence for malicious mischief, the East Side kids agree to visit a summer camp in the Adirondacks. En route, their car breaks down and they are reluctantly given accommodations in the home of Judge Malcolm Parker.

The Judge, under indictment for bribery, has much to fear. His life, as well as that of his niece Louise has been threatened by a gang of racketeers; his companion, Giles, has accused him of embezzling Louise's fortune; and his sinister housekeeper, Agnes, blames him for the death of her mistress, Leonora. The Judge's fears are compounded when he meets Knuckles Dolan, the boys' guardian, whom he had unjustly sentenced to death, only to have his verdict reversed and Knuckles exonerated.

Later that night, when Louise is kidnapped and the Judge found strangled, Giles and Simp, the Judge's bodyguard, accuse Knuckles of the murder, but the boys capture Simp and Giles and determine to find the murderer themselves. Muggs and Danny discover a secret panel in the library wall and enter a passage where they find Louise's unconscious body and glimpse the figure of a fleeing man. Knuckles captures the man, who identifies himself as Jim Harrison of the district attorney's office.

Amid the confusion, the real killer takes Louise captive, but the boys track him down and unmask Simp. Harrison then identifies the bodyguard as the triggerman seeking revenge on the Judge. With the crime solved, the boys can finally leave for their summer camp.

== Cast ==
=== The East Side Kids ===
- Bobby Jordan as Danny Dolan
- Leo Gorcey as Muggs
- Hal E. Chester as Buster
- Frankie Burke as Skinny
- Sunshine Sammy as Scruno
- Donald Haines as Peewee
- David Gorcey as Pete
- Eugene Francis as Algy Wilkes

=== Other cast ===
- Vince Barnett as Simp
- Inna Gest as Louise Mason
- Dave O'Brien as 'Knuckles' Dolan
- Minerva Urecal as Agnes
- Dennis Moore as Giles
- Forrest Taylor as Judge Malcolm Parker
- Alden 'Stephen' Chase as Jim Harrison
- Jerry Mandy as Cook
- George Humbert as Tony

== Production ==
This film was a direct follow-up to East Side Kids.

After completing the pilot film for the series, producer Sam Katzman was able to convince former Dead End Kids Bobby Jordan and Leo Gorcey to join the series. Katzman also brought in Gorcey's younger brother David, and former Our Gang star and Vaudeville entertainer "Sunshine Sammy" Morrison. Morrison had already known Katzman prior to joining the series.

While this film is technically a sequel to the previous film, some unexplained changes are made (namely the addition of "Muggs", "Scruno", and "Buster").

Most of the cast from the previous film did not return. Bobby Jordan replaced Harris Berger in the role of "Danny", and would retain the role for a large portion of the series' run.

Jack Edwards was originally slated to return as "Algernon Wilkes", but immediately declined after being offered a better paid part elsewhere. Eugene Francis took his place the day before filming began. Francis says he was paid $66 a week and the film was shot in five days. New York City exteriors were done at the Roach Studio, with interiors done on a soundstage on Gower St next to Columbia. Francis:

I knew what I was getting into. It was Gower Gulch-bottom of the barrel. The cliche in Hollywood at the time was if you were working in Gower Gulch you’re either on your way up or on your way down... They’d block it out so we knew where we were supposed to walk. Sometimes that was the trouble with the picture. Everyone would pile in a scene like some kind of free-for-all. It looked like it was ad-libbed or at least that's how it seemed to me. I’m a guy who likes rehearsing but they didn’t believe in it. I don’t think Leo Gorcey could ever rehearse. He was pretty wild and you never knew what was going to happen... There was a lot of ad-libbing but [the scenes and storyline were not substantially changed]. You’d never get the picture done otherwise. We didn’t have to be word perfect just approximate... I did know that Boys of the City was terribly shot. You could see the flashlight reflection of a candle during one scene! No one cared. It was junk. They were poverty row films and no one wanted to be in them.

Hal E. Chester returned, but as his character was killed off in the previous film, he plays a different character here. This would be his last East Side Kids film.

In addition to Chester, Frankie Burke, Donald Haines, and Dave O'Brien all returned, and each reprised their role from the previous film. This would be Burke's last East Side Kids film. After his departure, the character of "Skinny" was given to Haines, while "Peewee" was given to David Gorcey.

Filming started in June 1940.

== Reception ==
The plot of the film was reused a year later in Spooks Run Wild and again four years later in Crazy Knights.
