= Harlingen Air Force Base =

Former USAF base in Cameron County, Texas

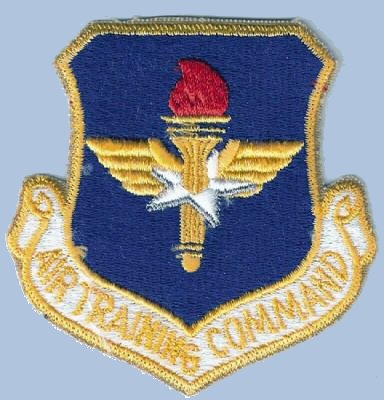
Harlingen Air Force Base Harlingen Army Airfield
- Part of Air Training Command (ATC)
- Located near: Harlingen, Texas
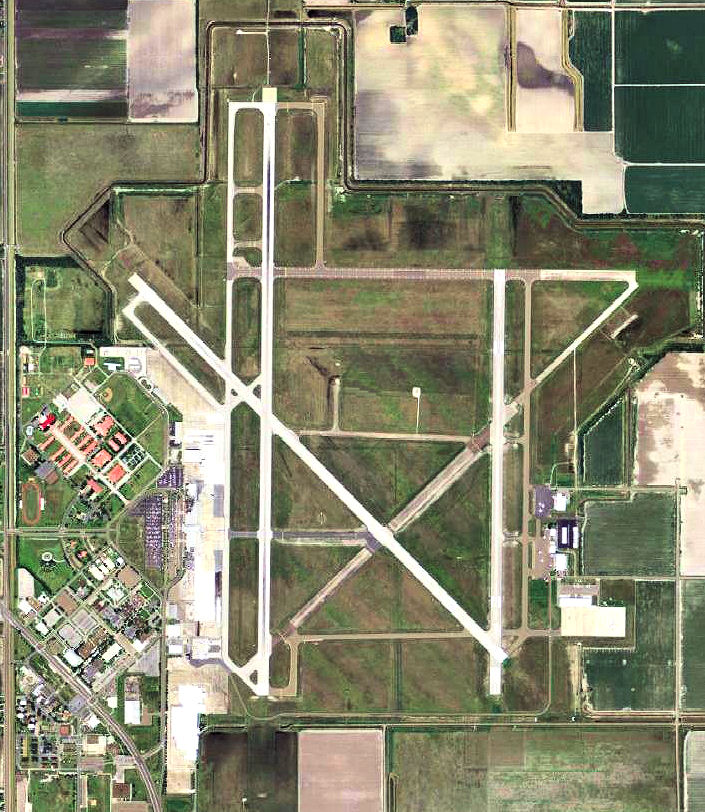
- 2006 USGS photo

Location
- Coordinates: 26°13′43″N 97°39′16″W

Site history
- Built: 1941
- In use: Open 1941 - closed 1962

Garrison information
- Garrison: 3610th Navigator Training Wing

Airfield information
- IATA: HRL; ICAO: KHRL

Summary
- Airport type: Public
- Elevation AMSL: 36 ft (11 m)
- Coordinates: 26°13′43″N 097°39′16″W

Map
- Location

Runways
Direction	Length		Surface
Direction	ft	m	Surface
13/31	7,257	2,212	Asphalt
17L/35R	5,949	1,813	Asphalt
17R/35L	8,301	2,530	Asphalt

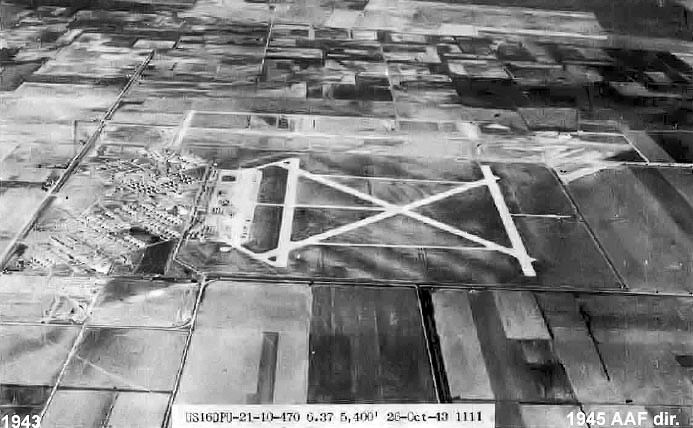
Oblique 26 October 1943 aerial photo looking north

Harlingen Air Force Base, originally Harlingen Army Airfield, is a former United States Air Force (USAF) base in northeast Harlingen, Texas. After the base closed, the field was redeveloped into Valley International Airport.

== History ==
=== World War II ===
With the outbreak of World War II in Europe it was decided to build a military airfield in Harlingen. Col John R. Morgan was the first commanding officer of the Harlingen Aerial Gunnery School, arriving in August 1941; he was to hold that appointment through World War II. On June 30, 1941 a contract was let for Morgan and Zachary, El Paso and Laredo builders, to start the military airfield construction. The mission of Harlingen Army Airfield was to train aerial gunners. The school received its first assigned cadre in August 1941. Its primary mission, with an initial student load of 600, was that of training aerial gunnery students in a five-week (extended to six weeks in 1943) training program. Over 48,000 soldiers were trained until the school, one of three such types in the country, closed in 1945. It was initially assigned to the United States Army Air Forces (USAAF) Gulf Coast Training Center as a flexible gunnery school, with the 78th Service Group being designated as the first host organization at the new airfield.

The airfield had two parallel north–south 6000-foot runways and two 5,200-foot runways aligned NE/SW and NW/SE. A large parking ramp and several aircraft hangars were built along with warehouses, dormitories, a fire station, some water towers and a number of support buildings, all wood and tar paper on concrete blocks. An auxiliary airfield was built at Port Isabel, Texas to support training and flight operations at Harlingen. Training was conducted in air-to-air & air-to-surface gunnery; air-to-air training used a variety of aircraft, including AT-6 Texans, BT-13 Valiants, P-63 Kingcobras, B-17 Flying Fortresses, B-26 Marauder and B-24 Liberators. For ground-based training, facilities included moving target ranges and gunnery simulators. The first class of aerial gunners graduated from the Gunnery School in January 1942.

=== Cold War ===
During the Korean War the base was reactivated on 17 March 1952. It was placed under the auspices of the Air Training Command (ATC), who renamed the field Harlingen Air Force Base and put it under the operational control of the 3610th Observer Training Wing (ATC) as part of its observer training program. Training was conducted primarily with Convair T-29 aircraft. On 1 September 1953, ATC also established a multi-engine pilot training school at Harlingen and realigned its observer training program by converting primary observer training into a primary-basic course and by providing advanced instruction in the basic course. Under the new program, every graduate of primary-basic training would be a qualified aircraft navigator. Effective 15 November 1956, Headquarters USAF directed the term navigator be substituted in all cases for observer or aircraft observer. That directive resulted in the re-designation of the 3610th Observer Training Wing to 3610th Navigator Training Wing.

In October 1959, ATC directed Mather AFB, California to move its primary-basic navigator training to Harlingen AFB by early 1962. This training had to be relocated so that Mather could take over Keesler AFB's electronic warfare officer (EWO) training by early 1963.

Early in 1960, the USAF authorized ATC to discontinue pilot and navigator preflight courses at Lackland AFB, Texas. Pilot preflight training became the responsibility of the primary training bases, and navigator preflight moved to the navigator schools. New navigator preflight training programs went into effect at Harlingen on 6 April.

In March 1961, during his budget message to Congress, U.S. president John F. Kennedy announced that the Department of Defense would close 73 military installations (70 stateside), including Harlingen AFB, Texas, the only ATC base on the list. Harlingen entered its last group of students into navigator training on 9 August. From that point on, James Connally AFB, Texas, provided all undergraduate navigator training until its subsequent closure and the relocation of navigator training back to Mather AFB.

In March 1962, the dining halls were consolidated as base staffing diminished, and the base hospital announced its change to dispensary status. The base hosted its last conference, a corrosion control meeting, in April as the gym, library, and military clothing sales store closed their doors. Undergraduate Navigator Training at Harlingen AFB ended on 6 June 1962 with the graduation of Class 62-22N. The 3610th Navigator Training Wing and subordinate units were discontinued on 1 July. At the same time, Air Training Command placed Harlingen AFB on inactive status.

In 1963, construction and renovation began on the site to be transformed into a military academy modeled after the United States Marine Corps. The school, Marine Military Academy, was opened for the first school year in 1965. The school still stands to this day and can house up to ~250 cadets.

== Notable appearances in media ==
In October and November 1942, the World War II movie Aerial Gunner (released 9 May 1943), partly about the aerial gunnery school in Harlingen, was set here. The movie was inspired by, and principal photography location filming was done at, the Harlingen Army Airfield; using many USAAF trainees and staff as extras. An uncredited, and then unknown, Robert Mitchum appeared in the film. The film actress Amelita Ward was discovered in Harlingen by the film's producers, and signed to a co-starring role.

== See also ==
- Texas World War II Army Airfields
- 79th Flying Training Wing (World War II)
