= Pride of the Bowery =

1940 film by Joseph H. Lewis

- Theatrical poster
- Directed by: Joseph H. Lewis
- Written by: William Lively; George H. Plympton
- Story by: Steven Clensos
- Produced by: Sam Katzman
- Starring: Leo Gorcey; Bobby Jordan 'Sunshine Sammy' Morrison; Donald Haines
- Distributed by: Monogram Pictures Corporation
- Release date: December 15, 1940
- Running time: 68 minutes
- Language: English

Pride of the Bowery is a black-and-white 1940 film and the fourth installment in the East Side Kids series. It was directed by Joseph H. Lewis and produced by Sam Katzman. It was released by Monogram Pictures on December 15, 1940.

== Plot ==
When Muggs refuses to train for the Golden Gloves match unless he has his own private camp in the country, Danny placates his pal by enlisting members of the Vassey Street Boys' Club in the Civilian Conservation Corps. Arriving at the camp, Muggs refuses to accept the authority of Allen, the leader of the boys, and treats the facility as if it was his own private property. Later, Muggs has a chance to demonstrate his true nature when he risks his own life to save Al from being crushed by a falling tree. The camp captain praises Muggs for his courage, and as a reward, Muggs requests a boxing match with Al. Norton, a small-time boxing promoter, comes to watch the fight, which ends in a draw. Furious at the outcome, Muggs refuses to shake his opponent's hand, an act which earns the enmity of the other boys. When the captain fails to remove the chip from Muggs' shoulder, his daughter, Elaine, tries to reform him through kindness. Meanwhile, Willie, one of the boys, steals one hundred dollars from the camp cash box and then lies to Muggs, telling him that he needed the money for his poor aunt. To get the money back for Willie, Muggs agrees to a fight arranged by promoter Norton. Although he takes a beating in the ring, Muggs earns the one hundred dollars. While returning the money to the cash box, Muggs is caught and accused of theft. He refuses to inform on Willie, and instead plans to run away. But Danny then forces Willie to tell the truth, proving Muggs is innocent.

== Cast ==
=== The East Side Kids ===
- Leo Gorcey as Muggs McGinnis
- Bobby Jordan as Danny Graham
- Donald Haines as Skinny
- David Gorcey as Peewee

=== Additional cast ===
- Sunshine Sammy Morrison as Scruno
- Bobby Stone as Willie
- Eugene Francis as Algy (uncredited)
- Kenneth Howell as Allen
- Mary Ainslee as Elaine White
- Kenneth Harlan as Captain Jim White
- Nick Stuart as Thumb Butte Ranger
- Lloyd Ingraham as Camp Doctor
- Steven Clensos as Man (uncredited)
- Carleton Young as Norton (uncredited)

== Crew ==
- Director: Joseph H. Lewis
- Writer: William Lively
- Story: Steven Clensos
- Producer: Sam Katzman
- Original Music: Johnny Lange, Lew Porter
- Cinematography: Robert E. Cline
- Editor: Robert Golden
- Set Decoration: Fred Preble
- Production Management: Robert Emmett Tansey
- Second Unit Director/Assistant Director: Arthur Hammond, Herman Pett
- Sound Recordist: Glen Glenn Sound

== Production ==
Pride of the Bowery was released in the United Kingdom under the title Here We Go Again which was the final line of the film.

Despite referencing the previous film with having Muggs take up boxing, there are noticeable continuity gaps (mainly with Scruno as a CCC member, rather than an East Side Kid).

Despite only having a small cameo, East Side Kid Eugene Francis was contractually obligated to appear in this film.

Filmed on location in Arizona.

Bobby Stone's first East Side Kids film. Stone would initially alternate between playing East Side Kid members and villains. By 1942, he became a full-fledged East Side Kid.

== See also ==
- List of boxing films
