= Fred Preble =

American art director

- Born: October 22, 1893; Los Angeles, California, U.S.
- Died: May 23, 1981 (aged87); Los Angeles, California, United States
- Occupation: Art director
- Years active: 1933–1952 (film)

Fred Preble (1893–1953) was an American art director who designed the sets on well over a hundred film productions. He worked for a variety of production companies, including the studios Monogram and PRC.

== Selected filmography ==
- Ship of Wanted Men (1933)
- I Can't Escape (1934)
- The Marriage Bargain (1935)
- His Fighting Blood (1935)
- Shadow of Chinatown (1936)
- Here's Flash Casey (1937)
- Whirlwind Horseman (1938)
- On the Great White Trail (1938)
- The Terror of Tiny Town (1938)
- Hitler – Beast of Berlin (1939)
- Mercy Plane (1939)
- Gun Code (1940)
- The Sagebrush Family Trails West (1940)
- Isle of Destiny (1940)
- Pride of the Bowery (1940)
- That Gang of Mine (1940)
- Law of the Timber (1941)
- The Mad Monster (1942)
- Take My Life (1942)
- Isle of Forgotten Sins (1943)
- Hitler's Madman (1943)
- Shep Comes Home (1948)
- The Dalton Gang (1949)
- Zamba (1949)
- Outlaw Country (1949)
- Red Desert (1949)
- The Girl from San Lorenzo (1950)
- Colorado Ranger (1950)
- The Daltons' Women (1950)
- West of the Brazos (1950)
- Korea Patrol (1951)
- Dead or Alive (1951)
- Man from Sonora (1951)
- The Vanishing Outpost (1951)
- The Black Lash (1952)

== Bibliography ==
- Pitts, Michael R. Poverty Row Studios, 1929–1940: An Illustrated History of 55 Independent Film Companies, with a Filmography for Each. McFarland & Company, 2005.
