= Richard Davies (American actor) =

American actor

Richard Davies (1915–1994) was an American actor.

Davies was born in Provo, Utah. His first films date from 1941, and he was active through the early 1960s, ranging from lead roles to small bit and character parts.

== Filmography ==
- San Antonio Rose (1941) - Eddie
- Unfinished Business (1941) - Richard
- Road Agent (1941) - Tom Martin
- Don't Get Personal (1942) - John Stowe
- The Mad Doctor of Market Street (1942) - Jim
- Gang Busters (1942, serial) - Happy Haskins
- Private Buckaroo (1942) - Lt. Howard Mason
- Top Sergeant (1942) - Phil
- Eagle Squadron (1942) - White, RAF pilot
- Give Out, Sisters (1942) - Kendall
- Strictly in the Groove (1942) - Bob Saunders
- Behind the Eight Ball (1942) - Clay Martin
- When Johnny Comes Marching Home (1942) - Lt. Tommy Bridges
- The Amazing Mrs. Holliday (1943) - Reporter (uncredited) (unbilled)
- Hi'ya, Chum (1943) - Worker (uncredited) (unbilled)
- The Sky's the Limit (1943) - Richard Merlin (uncredited) (unbilled)
- The Falcon in Danger (1943) - Kenneth Gibson
- The Seventh Victim (1943) - Detective (uncredited) (unbilled)
- The Iron Major (1943) - Chuck (uncredited) (unbilled)
- Christmas Holiday (1944) - Lieutenant (uncredited) (unbilled)
- Marine Raiders (1944) - Instructor (uncredited) (unbilled)
- Step Lively (1944) - Minor Role (uncredited) (unbilled)
- Swingin' on a Rainbow (1945) - Lieutenant (uncredited)
- Arson, Inc. (1949) - Junior Peyson
- The Party Crashers (1958) - Police Lieutenant (uncredited)
- Cimarron (1960) - Mr. Hodges (uncredited)
- The Couch (1960) - Doctor (uncredited)
- Married Too Young (1961) - Judge
- Wall of Noise (1963) - Paddock Judge (uncredited)
- Kisses for My President (1964) - Captain (uncredited) (final film role)
