= Johnny Duncan (actor) =

American actor

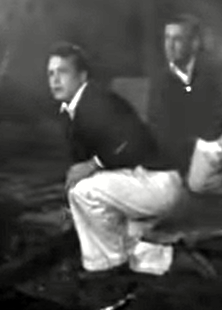
- Duncan (foreground) in Plan 9 from Outer Space (1957)
- Born: John Bowman Duncan; December 7, 1923; Kansas City, Missouri, U.S.
- Died: February 8, 2016 (aged 92); Davenport, Florida, U.S.
- Other name: Johnnie Duncan
- Occupation: Actor
- Years active: 1939–1960
- Spouse: Susan Duncan

John Bowman Duncan (December 7, 1923 – February 8, 2016) was an American actor. In addition to managing several business ventures, he made appearances at comic book conventions and collectors' shows worldwide.

== Biography ==
=== Career ===
Johnny Duncan learned to dance Jitterbug as a teen and by the age of 19, he had made his first major appearance in a dance role in the "King of Swing" Benny Goodman camp classic musical The Gang's All Here. This kicked off Duncan's career as a movie swing dancer and actor and led to numerous appearances in other films, and a contract with 20th Century Fox, where he appeared in productions with Shirley Temple and Jane Withers. Notable roles include parts in The East Side Kids, The Bowery Boys, Mystery of the 13th Guest and the 1949 serial Batman and Robin as Dick Grayson / Robin, the Boy Wonder. He was so young looking that he was twenty-five years old when he was hired to play the Boy Wonder.

He later appeared in bit parts in a number of films including Plan 9 from Outer Space. He played a member of The Black Rebels Motorcycle Club in the classic Marlon Brando film The Wild One in 1952. His final film appearance was in the 1960 film Spartacus.

=== Personal life ===
Duncan made occasional appearances at movie conventions, often signing photos from The East Side Kids and Batman and Robin until his death in February 2016 at the age of 92.

== Filmography ==
=== Film ===
Year	Title	Role	Notes
1939	The Arizona Wildcat	Townsboy	Uncredited
1942	Call of the Canyon	Jitterbug	Uncredited
1942	Junior Army	Cadet	Uncredited
1943	Clancy Street Boys	Cherry Streeter	Uncredited
1943	Action in the North Atlantic	Sailor	Uncredited
1943	The Unknown Guest	Teenager at Carnival	Uncredited
1943	Teen Age	Dan Murray	
1943	Swing Fever	Dancer, USO Soldier	Uncredited
1943	The Mystery of the 13th Guest	Harold Morgan	as John Morgan
1943	Campus Rhythm	Freshie	
1943	Where Are Your Children?	Jitterbug Dancer	Uncredited
1943	Jive Junction	Frank	
1944	Million Dollar Kid	Roy Cortland	as Johnnie Duncan
1944	Ghost Catchers	Jitterbug	Uncredited
1944	A Fig Leaf for Eve	Bellboy	Uncredited
1944	Delinquent Daughters	Rocky Webster	
1944	Youth Aflame	Jitterbugger	Uncredited
1944	Irish Eyes are Smiling	Call Boy	Uncredited
1944	Heavenly Days	Teenager Blowing Noisemaker	Uncredited
1944	Thirty Seconds Over Tokyo	Jitterbugger	Uncredited
1945	Salty O'Rourke	Ralph	Uncredited
1945	The Horn Blows at Midnight	Jitterbug Dancer	Uncredited
1945	Twice Blessd	Teenager	Uncredited
1945	Mr. Muggs Rides Again	Squeegie Robinson	
1945	Come Out Fighting	Gilbert Mitchell	
1946	Gay Blades	Bellboy	Uncredited
1946	From This Day Forward	Young Lieutenant	Uncredited
1946	Cinderella Jones	Newsboy	Uncredited
1946	The Walls Came Tumbling Down	Bellboy	Uncredited
1946	Inside Job	Messenger	Uncredited
1946	No Leave, No Love	Hotel Bellhop	Uncredited
1947	Johnny O'Clock	Newsboy	Uncredited
1947	Trail to San Antone	Ted Malloy	as John Duncan
1947	Beat the Band	Jitterbug	Uncredited
1947	Mr. District Attorney	Newsboy	Uncredited
1947	Sport of Kings	Jockey	Uncredited
1947	It Had to Be You	John	Scenes deleted
1948	Good Sam	Jitterbug	Uncredited
1948	Street Corner	Hal	John Duncan
1949	Fighting Fools	Fighter in Gym	Uncredited
1949	City Across the River	Student in Shop Class	Uncredited
1949	Batman and Robin	Robin / Dick Grayson	John Duncan
1949	Take One False Step	Bellhop	Uncredited
1949	The Woman on Pier 13	Bellhop	Uncredited
1950	Whirlpool	Soldier	Uncredited
1950	When Willie Comes Marching Home	Soldier	Uncredited
1950	A Wonderful Life	College Boy at Party	Short, uncredited
1950	Summer Stock	Stock Company Member	Uncredited
1950	Walk Softly, Stranger	Office Messenger	Uncredited
1951	Bedtime for Bonzo	Paperboy	Uncredited
1951	The Harlem Globetrotters	Attendant	Uncredited
1951	He Ran All the Way	Boy at the Pool	Uncredited
1951	David and Bathsheba	Jessie's Third Boy	Uncredited
1951	Two Dollar Bettor	Dancer	Uncredited
1951	The Big Night	Motorcycle Boy	Uncredited
1952	With a Song in my Heart	Soldier	Uncredited
1952	With the Pride of St. Louis	Western Union Boy	Uncredited
1952	Off Limits	Soldier in Fatigues	Uncredited
1953	So You Want to Be a Musician	Jitterbugger	Short, uncredited
1953	All Ashore	Dancer	Uncredited
1953	Miss Sadie Thompson	Marine	Uncredited
1953	The Wild One	Gang Member	Uncredited
1953	The Flaming Urge	Ralph Jarvis	
1954	Highway Dragnet	Marine	Uncredited
1954	The Caine Mutiny	Sailor	Uncredited
1955	Running Wild	Jitterbug Dancer	Uncredited
1956	Rock Around the Clock	Prom Dancer	Uncredited
1957	Plan 9 From Outer Space	Second Stretcher Bearer	Uncredited
1960	Spartacus	Beheaded Man	Uncredited
1989	Batmania from Comics to Screen	Robin / Dick Grayson	Documentary, archival footage

=== Television ===
Year	Title	Role	Notes
1951	The Stu Erwin Show	Self	Episode: "The Big Game", as Johnnie Duncan
1953	The Ford Television Theatre		Episode: "To Any Soldier"
1954	Public Defender	Bob	Episode: "Step Child", as John Duncan
1956	The Cisco Kid	Mickey Doan / Mail Rider	2 Episodes, as John B. Duncan
1957	Whirlybirds	Eddie James	Episode: "Cycle of Terror", as John Duncan
1963	Rawhide	Unnamed Cowboy	
