= The Mad Doctor of Market Street =

1942 film by Joseph H. Lewis

- Directed by: Joseph H. Lewis
- Screenplay by: Al Martin
- Starring: Una Merkel; Lionel Atwill; Nat Pendleton; Claire Dodd
- Cinematography: Jerome Ash
- Edited by: Ralph Dixon
- Production company: Universal Pictures Company, Inc.
- Distributed by: Universal Pictures Company, Inc.
- Release date: 4 January 1942
- Running time: 61 minutes
- Country: United States

The Mad Doctor of Market Street is a 1942 American horror film produced by Universal Pictures starring Lionel Atwill. The film was a low-budget project that used the studio's contract players and gave rising director Joseph H. Lewis an opportunity to demonstrate his versatility with little production money.

The film is part of the mad scientist genre. In this case, the film's scientist performs regeneration experiments on human subjects. He survives a shipwreck and is stranded on a tropical island with the other survivors. He gains influence over the natives by demonstrating his ability to resurrect others, and uses that influence to perform involuntary experiments on the other survivors.

== Plot ==
The mad doctor Benson pays a destitute man $1,000 to be the first human subject of his regeneration experiments. When the man dies, Dr. Benson boards a liner headed to New Zealand to escape police search. The ship catches fire and sinks. In a life boat Benson and five survivors land on a tropical island. He brings the apparently dead wife of the native chief back to life and is pronounced a god by the natives. Benson has the lifeboat burned and tells his fellow survivors that he intends to use them as subjects of his further experiments.

== Cast ==
Cast sourced from the American Film Institute and the book Universal Horrors.

- Una Merkel as Margaret Wentworth
- Lionel Atwill as Graham / Dr. Ralph Benson
- Nat Pendleton as Red Hogan
- Claire Dodd as Patricia Wentworth
- Hardie Albright as R.B. Saunders
- Richard Davies as Jim
- Anne Nagel as Mrs. Saunders
- John Eldredge as Dwight
- Noble Johnson as Elon
- Al Kikume as Kalo
- Milton Kibbee as Hadley
- Ray Mala as Barab
- Rosina Galli as Tanao
- Byron Shores as Crandall

== Production ==
The original script for The Mad Doctor of Market Street was written by Al Martin under the title Terror of the South Seas. The screenwriter and director Joseph H. Lewis had previously collaborated on Invisible Ghost for Monogram Pictures. When filming began in July 1941, the title changed to Terror of the Islands.

In a 1988 interview, Richard Davies remembered little, and stated that "[ Lionel Atwill ] was the star of the picture and we just had a speaking acquaintance" and that in his opinion "the picture was not as good as the picture I made with Fred Astaire called The Sky's the Limit for RKO."

== Release ==
The Mad Doctor of Market Street premiered in New York on January 4, 1942, and in Los Angeles on January 23. It opened wide on February 27, 1942. In early 1942, the film was double featured with The Wolf Man. The film had a pseudo-follow up with Abbott and Costello in Pardon My Sarong.

By 2006, the film was not released on home video in any format. The film was released on DVD on October 7, 2014, by the Willette Acquisition Corp. Along with Murders in the Zoo, The Mad Ghoul and The Strange Case of Doctor Rx, The Mad Doctor of Market Street was released on Blu-ray as part of Scream! Factory's Universal Horror Collection Volume 2 on July 23, 2019.

== Reception ==
From contemporary reviews, Lee Mortimer of The New York Daily News declared the film to be "on a par with all the other mad doctor mellers which have been shown on the Rialto screen." William Boehnel of The New York World-Telegram called the film "a really bad piece of workmanship" and that it had a "story so bogus, so labored, so dreary, the dialogue is so unfunny and the acting so embarrassing that the whole thing is in a class by itself. Rarely has anything more ponderous or tasteless come out of the film capitol." A review in Harrison's Reports declared that it was "so ridiculous is the story, and so slow-moving the action, that patrons will be bored instead of excited."

From retrospective reviews, the authors of Universal Horrors declared the film to be "a foolish but occasionally entertaining little time-killer if viewed with low expectations." Hal Erickson of AllMovie found that "the fact that it was the only Universal horror film directed by cult favorite Joseph H. Lewis, it's a shame that Mad Doctor of Market Street isn't better than it is." and that it was "worth the price of admission for its chilling closing sequence alone." The film received a two out of four star rating in Leonard Maltin's Classic Movie Guide. Writing for Famous Monsters of Filmland in 1962, Joe Dante Jr. included Mad Doctor of Market Street on his list of the worst horror films of all time. Dante declared it as Lionel Atwill's poorest film that was "nearly plotless" and a "very poor jungle thriller."
