= Million Dollar Kid =

1944 film by Wallace Fox

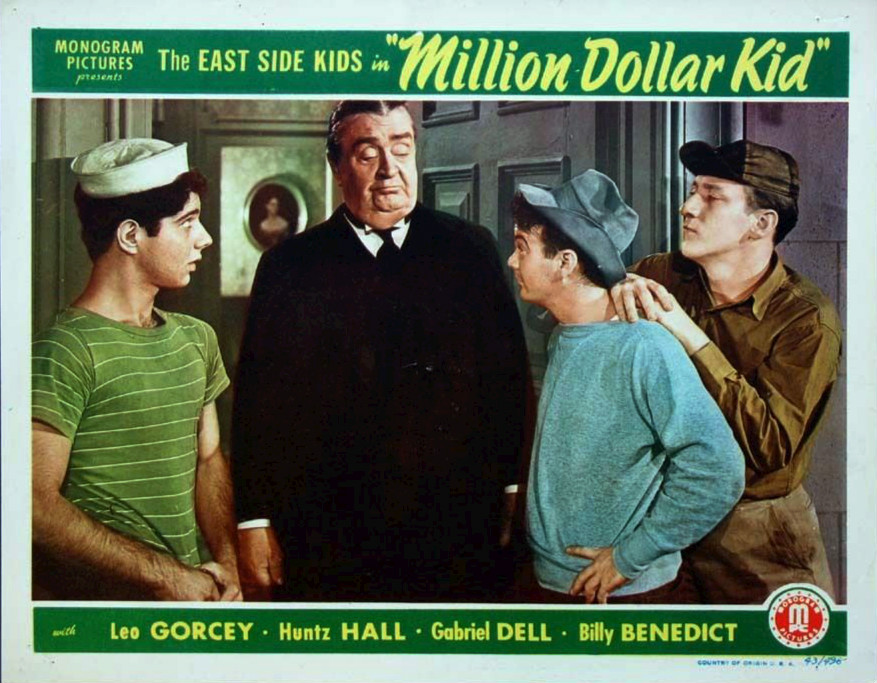
- Lobby card
- Directed by: Wallace Fox
- Written by: Frank H. Young (original story & screenplay)
- Produced by: Jack Dietz (producer); Sam Katzman (producer); Barney A. Sarecky (associate producer)
- Starring: East Side Kids
- Cinematography: Marcel Le Picard
- Edited by: Carl Pierson
- Production company: Monogram Pictures
- Release date: February 18, 1944
- Running time: 65 minutes
- Country: United States
- Language: English

Million Dollar Kid is a 1944 American comedy film directed by Wallace Fox starring the East Side Kids.

== Plot ==
In the East Side Kids' clubhouse, Muggs McGinnis laments the epidemic of mugging that has been plaguing their streets. While waiting outside a store that afternoon, the boys witness a man being attacked in the alley and come to his defense, chasing away his assailants. In gratitude, the man, millionaire John Cortland, hands Muggs his business card. When the cynical Muggs tosses the card in a garbage can, Glimpy McClosky digs it out and finds the man's cash-laden wallet in the trash.

After the boys deliver the wallet to Capt. Mathews of the police department, the captain mistakes them for the thieves and arrests them. Cortland soon arrives at the police station to claim his wallet, however, and identifies the boys as his rescuers. Upon discovering that the boys long for a gymnasium, Cortland invites them to his house the next day. There, Cortland shows them his son John Jr.'s basement gymnasium, and after explaining that John is overseas fighting, he offers the boys the use of the facilities.

Escorting the boys upstairs, Cortland introduces them to his pretty daughter Louise and his son Roy, whose hand has been sprained. Noting Roy's injured hand, Muggs begins to suspect that he was involved in the robbery, but when Capt. Mathews asks for a description of the thieves, Muggs refuses to cooperate. Soon after, Louise's fiancé, French soldier Lt. Andre Dupree, arrives, and Louise informs her father that all the servants have quit, thus jeopardizing a dinner party she had planned for that evening. Attracted to Louise, Muggs suggests that his mother and Mrs. McClosky would be happy to cook and serve for the party.

When Muggs overhears Andre drop his French accent during a phone conversation, he begins to suspect that he is a phony and decides to follow him. Muggs and Glimpy trail Andre to the Zig Zag Club, where he meets his paramour, showgirl Maizie Dunbar. Deciding to tell Louise the truth about her fiancé, Muggs and Glimpy return to the Cortland mansion, but Louise refuses to believe their story. Meanwhile, the other boys are walking past the neighborhood pool hall when they see Roy playing pool with two of the robbers. When Muggs returns to the clubhouse, the boys tell him about spotting Roy at the pool hall.

Later that night, Muggs takes Maizie to the Cortland party, and when she sees Andre flirting with Louise, she jealously confronts him. After overhearing their heated conversation, Louise finally realizes that Andre is a gigolo and asks him to leave. Later, the doorbell rings, and when Muggs answers it, he is handed a telegram, notifying the Cortlands of John's death in combat. Summoning Cortland from the dinner table, Muggs gives him the bad news. Grief-stricken, Cortland faints and the boys carry him to his room. While upstairs, they sneak into Roy's room and find a cap worn by one of the robbers. Muggs vows to reform the boy, and after the party, the boys follow Roy to the pool hall.

In the ensuing fight, Roy runs away and Muggs and the others chase him. During the mêlée, the crooks capture Skinny and take him hostage. When the boys catch Roy, Muggs challenges him to a boxing match to teach him a lesson. Hearing shouts coming from the gymnasium, Cortland goes to investigate and overhears Muggs interrogating Roy about the robbery. Soon after, Louise appears and announces that she has just received a phone call from Lefty, one of the crooks, who is threatening to harm Skinny if Roy informs on him. Angered, Roy agrees to lead the boys to Lefty's hideout. Once there, a brawl ensues and Muggs sends Roy home to safety.

After subduing the crooks, Muggs and the boys deliver them to Capt. Mathews at police headquarters. Soon after, Roy enters the captain's office and turns himself in. When Muggs eloquently defends Roy and pleads for leniency, the captain decides to release Roy and suggests that Muggs champion the boy's case in court. Just then, Cortland arrives and, after forgiving his son, offers Muggs and the boys his heartfelt thanks.

== Cast ==
=== The East Side Kids ===
- Leo Gorcey as Muggs McGinnis
- Huntz Hall as Glimpy McClosky
- Billy Benedict as Skinny
- Al Stone as Herbie, Glimpy's cousin
- David Durand as Danny (a.k.a. Dave)
- Jimmy Strand as Pinkie (a.k.a. Lou)
- Buddy Gorman as Stinkie (a.k.a. Slug)
- Bobby Stone as Rocky (uncredited)

=== Remaining cast ===
- Gabriel Dell as Lefty
- Louise Currie as Louise Cortland
- Noah Beery as Captain Mathews
- Iris Adrian as Mazie Dunbar
- Herbert Heyes as John H. Cortland
- Robert Greig as Spevin - Cortlands' Butler
- Johnny Duncan as Roy Cortland
- Stanley Brown as Lt. Andre Dupree
- Patsy Moran as Mrs. McClosky
- Mary Gordon as Mrs. McGinnis
- Pat Costello as Spike
- Bernard Gorcey as Messenger with Telegram (uncredited)
- Merrill McCormick as An Arab (uncredited)
- Pat McKee as Fink, the Pool Hall Proprietor (uncredited)

=== Notes ===
- Only East Side Kids film for Al Stone. Stone will forever be remembered by fans of the series as Glimpy (Huntz Hall)'s obnoxious cousin Herbie.
- Leo Gorcey's father, Bernard, has a cameo as a telegram messenger.
- Although playing "Lefty", a villain in this film, actor Gabriel Dell was also a regular member of the Dead Ends Kids and East Side Kids.
