= The Falcon in Danger =

1943 film by William Clemens

- Film poster
- Directed by: William Clemens
- Written by: Fred Niblo Jr.; Craig Rice
- Based on: Characters created by Michael Arlen
- Produced by: Maurice Geraghty
- Starring: Tom Conway; Jean Brooks; Elaine Shepard; Amelita Ward
- Cinematography: Frank Redman
- Edited by: George Crone
- Music by: Roy Webb
- Production company: RKO Pictures
- Distributed by: RKO Pictures
- Release date: July 17, 1943 (United States)
- Running time: 69 minutes
- Country: United States
- Language: English

The Falcon in Danger is a 1943 American mystery film directed by William Clemens and starring Tom Conway, Jean Brooks, Amelita Ward and Elaine Shepard. The film was the sixth of thirteen The Falcon detective films produced by RKO, the final ten all starring Conway.

== Plot ==
At a New York airport, a passenger plane coming in from Washington, D.C., crash-lands, however nobody is on board. The aircraft had been hijacked at its previous stop and all of the passengers, except the pilot, leading industrialist Stanley Harris Palmer and his assistant Wally Fairchild, are found stranded at a rest stop; $100,000 worth of securities are also missing.

Although he promised his fiancée from Texas, Bonnie Caldwell, that he will give up solving crime, Tom Lawrence, aka the Falcon, can't resist the lure of a fresh mystery. When Palmer's daughter Nancy Palmer receives a ransom note, she asks for his help in locating her father. One of the Falcon's prime suspects is Nancy's jealous cousin Iris. Police Inspector Timothy Donovan and his assistant, Bates, are called to investigate the mystery. Nancy is told to leave $25,000 at a drinking fountain, while Iris tells Tom that she suspects Nancy's fiancé Ken Gibson told the kidnappers about the $100,000 in securities.

Tom accompanies Iris and Nancy to the Palmers' house and later sees Nancy leave a box by the drinking fountain. When two men collect the box, Tom follows their car on horseback and finds it belongs to an antique store owned by George Morley. Donovan announces that Palmer has returned home alive; he and Fairchild stayed on the aircraft but strangers robbed Palmer at gunpoint and ordered him to parachute from the aircraft while the pilot set the controls on autopilot. Tom also finds a piece of junk that appears to be part of the aircraft and the missing securities, which he turns over to Donovan.

Donovan suspects Fairchild but state troopers report the missing pilot and Fairchild have been found dead in a field. Morley becomes the next likely culprit but disappears. As he unravels the mystery, Tom reconstructs the second part of the flight. With other passengers gone, Palmer killed Fairchild who had proof of Palmer's cheating the government, then after take-off, had also killed the pilot and dumped the bodies.

Palmer's dog attacks Morley in the antique store. Donovan arrives in time to see Tom shoot and kill Palmer in self-defense. Later at the airport, Bonnie tells Tom she is going home to Texas by herself. Dejected, Tom declares that he is forsaking all women, until a pretty co-ed approaches him asking for his help.

== Cast ==
- Tom Conway as Tom Lawrence/The Falcon
- Jean Brooks as Iris Fairchild
- Elaine Shepard as Nancy Palmer
- Amelita Ward as Bonnie Caldwell
- Cliff Clark as Inspector Timothy Donovan
- Edward Gargan as Detective Bates
- Clarence Kolb as Stanley Harris Palmer
- Felix Basch as Morley
- Richard Davies as Kenneth Gibson
- Richard Martin as George Morley
- Erford Gage as Evan Morley
- Eddie Dunn as Detective Grimes
- Ian Wolfe as Thomas
- Art Dupuis as Warden
- George De Normand as Policeman
- Bob Thom as Excited Man
- Harry Semels as Excited Man
- Sid Troy as Excited Man
- Elmer Jerome as Eric
- Rosemary LaPlanche as Nurse
- Robert Emmett Keane as Wally Fairchild
- Lew Kelly as Guard
- Lynton Brent as Guard
- Eddie Borden as Welder
- Hooper Atchley as Dr. Oliver
- Bruce Edwards as Mechanic
- Robert Andersen as Attendant
- Joan Barclay as Hysterical Girl
- Selmer Jackson as Official
- Charles Trowbridge as Doctor

== Production ==
Principal photography on The Falcon in Danger took place from April 13 to early May 1943. According to a Hollywood Reporter news item, the growing popularity of The Falcon series led to rushing the film into production. The previous film in the series, The Falcon Strikes Back was filmed from January 19 to early February 1943.

To conserve costs, the main entrance and several buildings on the studio lot were camouflaged to look like the factory owned by Stanley Harris Palmer (Clarence Kolb) and an airport. In one cutaway outside the factory, the word "Studio" can be seen written on the side of a building. The aircraft depicted in the film were a miniature Lockheed Model 10 Electra and stock footage of a Douglas DC-3 in flight, and the Capelis XC-12, a failed 1933 twin-engine transport aircraft that found new life at RKO as a non-flying movie prop.

== Reception ==
Film historians Richard Jewell and Vernon Harbin described The Falcon in Danger as an attempt to "upgrade the romantic appeal of The Falcon series"; adding that "Screenwriters Fred Niblo Jr. and Craig Rice did a fairly smooth job of working the beauties into their story, an otherwise standard whodunit involving a double murder and the theft of $100,000 in securities."
