= Inna Gest =

Ukrainian-American actress

- Born: February 11, 1921; Odesa, Ukrainian SSR, Soviet Union (now Ukraine)
- Died: December 31, 1964 (aged 43); San Francisco, California, United States
- Occupation: Actress
- Years active: 1939–1948 (film)

Inna Gest (February 11, 1921 – December 31, 1964) was a film actress. In Hollywood she played the female lead in several films, mainly westerns. Increasingly cast in smaller parts she retired from acting after 1948. Gest was born in Odesa, Ukrainian SSR, Soviet Union (now Ukraine).

== Selected filmography ==
- Fast and Furious (1939)
- What a Life (1939)
- Boys of the City (1940)
- The Golden Trail (1940)
- Gun Code (1940)
- Hard Guy (1941)
- Six Gun Gospel (1943)
- You Can't Beat the Law (1943)
- Ladies of Washington (1944)
- No Minor Vices (1948)

== Bibliography ==
- Dixon, Wheeler. Producers Releasing Corporation: A Comprehensive Filmography and History. McFarland, 1986.
- Pitts, Michael R. Western Film Series of the Sound Era. McFarland, 2009.
