= Aerial Gunner =

1943 American World War II film

- Theatrical release poster
- Directed by: William H. Pine
- Written by: Maxwell Shane
- Based on: an idea suggested by Jack F. Dailey
- Produced by: William H. Pine; William C. Thomas
- Starring: Chester Morris; Richard Arlen; Jimmy Lydon
- Cinematography: Fred Jackman Jr.
- Edited by: William H. Ziegler
- Music by: Daniele Amfitheatrof
- Production company: Pine-Thomas Productions
- Distributed by: Paramount Pictures
- Release date: 9 May 1943
- Running time: 78 minutes
- Country: United States
- Language: English

Aerial Gunner is a 1943 American black-and-white World War II propaganda film produced by William C. Thomas and William H. Pine, who also directed. The film stars Chester Morris, Richard Arlen, and Jimmy Lydon. This was the first feature film directed by Pine, who produced other films through his company, Pine-Thomas Productions. Aerial Gunner was distributed by Paramount Pictures.

== Plot ==
Policeman Jon Davis (Richard Arlen) informs "Foxy" Pattis (Chester Morris) at his shooting gallery, that his criminal father has died. Foxy blames all policemen, feeling they harassed him all his life and were responsible for his death. John Davis enlists and "Foxy" Pattis is drafted into the United States Army Air Forces where Foxy becomes the instructor at an aerial gunnery school. He makes life miserable for Jon, now a "Flying Sergeant" student, trying to force the former policeman to resign.

Despite Foxy's hostility, Jon is able to pass the course. He later befriends a young Texas gunnery candidate, Sandy (Jimmy Lydon), whose father was an airman killed at Hickam Field during the attack on Pearl Harbor. Sandy invites Jon and Foxy to his family's ranch, where both men fall for Sandy's sister Peggy (Amelita Ward). However, during one mission during class, Sandy nerves catch on and accidentally damages his tail, the Pilot manages to bail out but Sandy is unable to bail and is mortally injured when the plane crashes.

After graduation, Jon is commissioned as a lieutenant and is assigned as a pilot of a light bomber, with many of his classmates now his crew. A belligerent Foxy serves as his gunner and is not accepted as a team player by the other members of the aircrew. During a bombing mission against the Japanese, however, he makes the ultimate sacrifice in trying to protect the other crew members when the bomber is shot down behind enemy lines.

== Cast ==
- Chester Morris as T/Sgt. "Foxy" Pattis
- Richard Arlen as T/Sgt, later Lt., Jonathan "Jon" Davis
- Jimmy Lydon as Pvt. Sanford "Sandy" Lunt
- Amelita Ward as Peggy Lunt (credited as Lita Ward)
- Dick Purcell as Pvt. Lancelot "Gadget" Blaine
- Keith Richards as Sgt. Henry "Jonesy" Jones
- William 'Billy' Benedict as Pvt. Jackson "Sleepy" Laswell
- Olive Blakeney as Mrs. Sanford Lunt
- Robert Mitchum as S/Sgt Benson (uncredited) (Note: Robert Mitchum shows up between 38 and 40 minutes into the movie. Later film stars Kirk Alyn and Jeff Corey make uncredited appearances.)

== Production ==
The film was announced in August 1942 and was based on an idea by Army lieutenant Jack Dailey, who had worked in public relations for Paramount; after joining the service, he worked in public relations for Harlingen Air Force Base. It became a vehicle for Richard Arlen and Chester Morris, who were the two top stars of Pine-Thomas Productions.

In October, Jimmy Lydon, who played Harry Aldrich in a series of B movies for Paramount, joined the cast. William Pine directed; it was his first film, though he had directed several wartime propaganda shorts. Thomas announced he would direct Alaska Highway, but he ended up not doing it, making his directorial debut on a different feature.

The use of USAAF aircraft in the film elevated Aerial Gunner from the standard B film of the era.

Principal photography for Aerial Gunner by the Paramount Pictures Pine-Thomas Productions unit took place from October 21 to mid-November 1942. Location work was done at the air gunner training school at Harlingen Air Force Base, Texas. Many of the USAAF trainees from the base are used in the film as extras.

Lita Ward made her film debut as the female lead. She lived in Texas and was cast while the film was shooting on location.

With the assistance of the USAAF, aerial scenes featured North American T-6 Texan and Beech AT-11 Kansan trainers at Harlingen Air Force Base, and Lockheed B-34 Lexington bombers. The use of operational aircraft lent an air of authenticity to this low-budget B film feature, although a number of ground scenes that were later added had to rely on studio rear projection work.

The film was rushed into theatrical release to beat another World War II feature to theaters, which focused on a B-17 Flying Fortress air crew, Howard Hawks' production of Air Force (1943). Paramount authorized an extra $75,000 to help promote Aerial Gunner.

== Reception ==
Aerial Gunner had its world premiere on May 9, 1943, at Harlingen Air Force Base, where much of the film is set. Other premieres at major cities followed.

=== Box Office ===
The film was very popular in army camps, despite being a relatively low budget B film.

=== Critical ===
Reception by film critics was mixed, with Kate Cameron of The New York Daily News describing the film as the "most ambitious picture" that Paramount producers William Pine and William Thomas had turned out.

Bosley Crowther completely disagreed in his review for The New York Times; he dismissed the effort as nothing more than "... heroics for the bumpkins in one-syllable clichés. There are a few interesting sequences in it of training at an aerial gunnery school and some routine, but always pretty pictures of planes climbing up and setting down. But never do they rise above the ceiling prescribed by a normal B-film. This is strictly a picture for the shooting-gallery trade".

The Chicago Daily Tribune called the film "a forthright little number very well acted and directed".

The Los Angeles Times called it "well acted...perhaps it is a little too grim".

Pine-Thomas were so impressed with the performance by Morris that they signed him to a new three-picture contract, which began after Tornado.
