= Hard Guy =

1941 film by Elmer Clifton

- Directed by: Elmer Clifton
- Written by: Oliver Drake (writer)
- Produced by: Arthur Alexander (producer); George R. Batcheller (executive producer); Alfred Stern (producer)
- Starring: Mary Healy; Jack La Rue; Kane Richmond; Iris Adrian
- Cinematography: Edward Linden
- Edited by: Charles Henkel Jr.
- Music by: Eduardo Durant
- Production company: Producers Releasing Corporation
- Distributed by: Producers Releasing Corporation
- Release date: October 17, 1941
- Running time: 67 minutes
- Country: United States
- Language: English

Hard Guy is a 1941 American crime film directed by Elmer Clifton and starring Mary Healy, Jack La Rue, Kane Richmond and Iris Adrian. It was a low-budget second feature distributed by the Producers Releasing Corporation. The film is also known by the alternative title Professional Bride in the United Kingdom.

== Plot ==
Vic Monroe is the proprietor of the Tropical Inn nightclub. He also runs a special racket involving the women working at the club. The female employees catch eligible bachelors, marry them and then gets the marriage annulled immediately, making quite a profit from the settlement.

Monroe's plans to marry off one of his dancers, Doris Starr, who is still oblivious about the annulment racket going on. Monroe has his sights on Anthony Tremaine Jr., and Monroe's task is to get the two to meet so they fall into each other's arms.

Monroe pulls it off and the two love birds are married without their families' knowledge. Monroe sees that the story ends up in the papers and Tony's father surprises the couple on their honeymoon, threatening to disinherit his son if he doesn't end the marriage.

Julie Cavanaugh, Doris' sister, and the rest of her family and the neighbors get involved in the matter and a brawl ensues. The police arrive and arrests everyone involved, including Steve Randall, the governor's son.

The next morning the papers are filled with the fighting. Monroe is overjoyed and uses his lawyer friend, Ben Sherwood, to pretend being Doris' father and negotiate a big settlement to keep a lid on the matter. Doris and Tony drift apart because of the trouble surrounding their marriage.

An investigation of the Tropical Inn starts, led by State Detective Tex Cassidy, pretending to be a friend of the governor. He visits the club and brings Steve. They are accompanied by Julie and Goldie Duvall. Doris is worried for her sister, and tells her to stay away from Monroe. Monroe has led Doris to believe that he will marry her and she believes this, even though she knows he is as crooked.

When Doris sees Monroe kissing another woman in the club, she quits her job and says she will give Tony back the money from the settlement. Monroe follows her to her apartment and kills her. He is suspected of the murder since he was the last person seen alone with Doris.

Julie starts looking into the circumstances surrounding her sister's death, and finds out that "her father" threatened to take legal action against Tony if they didn't settle. Since Julie's father has been dead for years she knows something is fishy. She suspects Monroe murdered her sister.

After Monroe finds out that Doris had written down the serial numbers of all the notes from the Tremaine settlement, he breaks into her home to retrieve them, but does not find them.

Julie discovers that Monroe runs the annulment racket and pretends to be interested in participating. Monroe plans to marry her to the Steve. After the marriage, Julie refuses to go through with the annulment.

Steve and Monroe get into a fight, and after Steve knocks Monroe in the head, the club owner pulls a gun on Steve. At gunpoint, Monroe forces the couple to sign an annulment agreement.

Later in the evening, Steve returns to the club with a gun, and there is a shootout. It ends when the governor arrives, bringing the serial numbers Doris wrote down, matching them to the money in a briefcase Monroe is carrying in his hand.

When Monroe is caught and arrested, Steve and Julie continue their romance and Goldie reveals she has fallen in live with Tex, the detective.

== Cast ==
- Jack La Rue as Vic Monroe
- Mary Healy as Julie Cavanaugh
- Kane Richmond as Steve Randall
- Iris Adrian as Goldie Duvall
- Gayle Mellott as Doris Starr
- Jack Mulhall as Tex Cassidy
- Howard Banks as Anthony Tremaine Jr.
- Ben Taggart as Ben Sherwood
- C. Montague Shaw as Anthony Tremaine Sr.
- Inna Gest as Mona Day
- Arthur Gardner as Dick Clayton
