= Clancy Street Boys =

1943 film by William Beaudine

- Original film poster
- Directed by: William Beaudine
- Written by: Harvey Gates
- Produced by: Sam Katzman; Jack Dietz
- Starring: Leo Gorcey; Bobby Jordan; Huntz Hall; Noah Beery
- Cinematography: Mack Stengler
- Edited by: Carl Pierson
- Music by: Edward J. Kay
- Distributed by: Monogram Pictures Corporation
- Release date: April 23, 1943 (U.S.)
- Running time: 66 mins.

Clancy Street Boys is a 1943 comedy film directed by William Beaudine and starring the East Side Kids. It is Beaudine's first film with the team; he would direct several more in the series and many in the Bowery Boys canon. Leo Gorcey married the female lead Amelita Ward. There is no mention of "Clancy Street" in the film, but a rival gang at Cherry Street appears at the beginning and climax of the film.

== Plot ==
Much to the dismay of Mugs McGinnis, everyone in his East Side Kids gang (as well as the rival The Cherry Street Gang) gets to smack his rear end eighteen times in celebration of his eighteenth birthday. His mother Molly then becomes distraught when she gets a letter from his "uncle" Pete Monahan, a rancher friend of his late father, stating that he will soon visit them in New York. Molly explains to her only child that ever since his father lied to Pete that he had seven children, Pete has been sending birthday checks for each child. Pete is unaware that the McGinnises are so poor that they could never afford to return the checks.

Just then, Pete and his grown daughter Judy ride up to the McGinnis apartment on horseback. Mugs declares that the rest of his supposed brothers and sisters are working at a defense plant, and later, forces his gang to pretend to be his siblings. Glimpy is dressed up like a girl, and Scruno), who is black, is introduced as an adopted child. Pete is delighted by the brood and takes them all out to a nightclub for fun.

The next day, local opportunist George Mooney (tells Pete that he is being duped by Mugs. Pete is offended when he learns the truth about the McGinnis brood, and tells Mugs to forget he ever had an uncle. The next day, Mugs and the gang go to the hotel to return the gifts and apologize to Judy, and learn that Pete has disappeared. When George, who has arranged Pete's kidnapping, comes to the hotel for a visit, the boys hide in another room, but overhear him say that Pete has had an accident, and that he will take Judy to him.

Judy pockets her gun before she leaves with George, and East Side Kid Danny hops onto the bumper of George's car. When the car stops, Danny gets off and calls Mugs to tell him the location of the kidnappers, but is then caught himself and held hostage along with Pete and Judy. The Cherry Street gang joins with the East Side Kids in fighting against the kidnappers, and when policeman Flanagan investigates the ruckus, he arrests the kidnappers.

Later, the East Side Kids are guests at Pete's ranch, and try to impress each other by riding bucking broncos.

== Cast ==
=== The East Side Kids ===
- Leo Gorcey as Ethelbert 'Mugs' McGinnis
- Huntz Hall as Glimpy Freedhoff
- Bobby Jordan as Danny
- Benny Bartlett as Benny
- Sammy Morrison as Scruno
- Dick Chandlee as Stash (a.k.a. Skinny)
- Eddie Mills as Dave (a.k.a. Eddie)

=== Remaining cast ===
- Noah Beery as Pete Monahan
- Amelita Ward as Judy Monaham
- Rick Vallin as George Mooney
- Billy Benedict as Butch, Cherry Street Leader
- J. Farrel MacDonald as Police Sergeant Flanagan
- Jan Rubini as Violinist
- Martha Wentworth as Mrs. Molly McGinnis
- George DeNormand as Williams
- Bernard Gorcey (uncredited) as Liquor Store Owner
- Johnny Duncan (uncredited) as Cherry Streeter
- William Frambes (uncredited) as Cherry Streeter
- Jimmy Strand (uncredited) as Cherry Streeter

== Notes ==
The film features William Benedict's first appearance with the East Side Kids. Long a juvenile player, Benedict had made several films in Universal Pictures' similar Little Tough Guys series. He would later replace Scruno as one of the gang in further films in the series and in the later Bowery Boys series.

The Films of the Bowery Boys noted the films' comedy and fast pace with a new situation developing every ten minutes. The authors noticed that the same format of ten-minute segments proceeded as follows-

1st) Unrelated scenes
2nd) Plot development
3rd) Introduction of new aspect
4th) Isolated sequence
5th) Transitory scenes
6th) Bam! Pow! Sock!

A film review from the Motion Picture Daily noted that in Clancy Street Boys the film was a variation from the previous series of starting the film with the boys on the right side of the law and keeping them there throughout the picture. Judy is played by Leo Gorcey's future wife, Amelita Ward. Gabriel Dell, Stanley Clements, Bobby Stone, and Dave Durand are absent from this film. With Clement's usual gang name of "Stash" taken by Dick Chandlee. Bennie Bartlett's second and last East Side Kids film. He would later rejoin the group when they became The Bowery Boys. The photo in the film of Muggs' father is Leo Gorcey's real father, Bernard, who would play Louie in the Bowery Boys series. Bernard also had a small appearance in the film as a liquor store owner in his first film of the series.
