= Swingin' on a Rainbow =

1945 film by William Beaudine

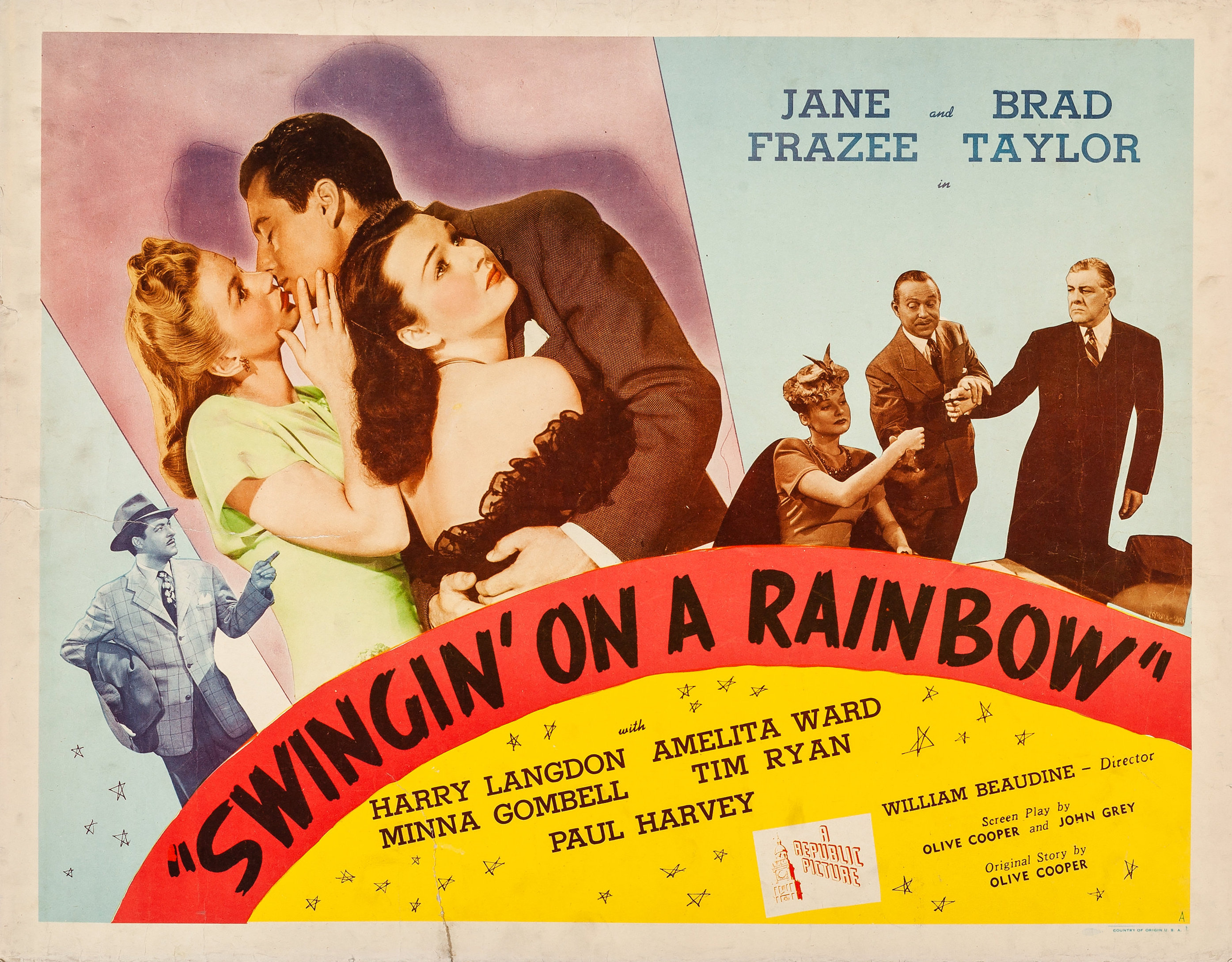
- 1945 poster
- Directed by: William Beaudine
- Written by: Olive Cooper; John Grey
- Produced by: Edward J. White
- Starring: Jane Frazee; Brad Taylor; Harry Langdon; Richard Davies
- Distributed by: Republic Pictures
- Release date: 1945
- Running time: 72 minutes
- Country: United States
- Language: English

Swingin' on a Rainbow is a 1945 American film directed by William Beaudine and starring Jane Frazee. It includes the final film appearance of Harry Langdon. The film's copyright was renewed in 1973, as a published work from 1945 it will enter the public domain on January 1, 2041.

== Plot ==
At a radio station run by Thomas Marsden, a songwriter, Jimmy Rhodes, skips town without fulfilling a contractual obligation, so amateur songstress Lynn Bird is hired to replace him, Marsden mistakenly believing her to be Rhodes's partner.

Bird composes and writes a few songs, with help from Marsden's assistant, Chester Willoughby, and her success helps save the station.

== Cast ==
- Jane Frazee as Lynn Bird
- Brad Taylor as Steve Ames
- Paul Harvey as Marsden
- Richard Davies as Jimmy Rhodes
- Minna Gombell as Minnie
- Harry Langdon as Willoughby
- Amelita Ward as Barbara
- Helen Talbot as Myrtle
