= Gang Busters (serial) =

1942 film

- Directed by: Noel M. Smith; Ray Taylor; Jacques Jaccard (asst.)
- Written by: Morgan Cox; Phillips Lord; Al Martin; Victor McLeod; George H. Plympton
- Produced by: Ford Beebe
- Starring: Kent Taylor; Irene Hervey; Ralph Morgan; Robert Armstrong
- Cinematography: John W. Boyle; William A. Sickner
- Edited by: Irving Birnbaum; Paul Landres; Charles Maynard
- Distributed by: Universal Pictures
- Release date: 1942
- Running time: 13 chapters (251 minutes)
- Country: United States
- Language: English

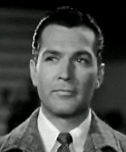
Kent Taylor

Gang Busters is a 1942 Universal movie serial based on the radio series Gang Busters.

== Plot ==
The city is terrorized by a crime wave masterminded by the elusive, soft-spoken Professor Mortis (Ralph Morgan) from his base in a forgotten cavern beneath the rails of the city's subway line. He declares over the radio that The League of Murdered Men will exact revenge upon the city unless all the city officials, especially the mayor and Chief of Police, are turned out of office. Mortis's gang members were officially pronounced dead in prison after having supposedly committed suicide (in reality taking a drug that suspended animation) but later revived by medical genius Mortis, who recruited them to do his bidding.

Police detective Bill Bannister (Kent Taylor), in charge of investigating the crime wave, is visited by his brother, a reformed criminal who will inform on Mortis. Mortis's men kill Bannister's brother before he talks, and Bannister vows to get Mortis. Together with his partner Tim Nolan (Robert Armstrong) and police chief Martin O'Brien (Joseph Crehan), Bannister uses the latest police methods to track down Mortis. Following the story are newspaper reporter Vicki Logan (Irene Hervey) and her photographer Happy Haskins (Richard Davies).

== Cast ==
Starring:

- Kent Taylor as Det. Lt. Bill Bannister
- Irene Hervey as Vicki Logan, reporter
- Ralph Morgan as Professor Mortis
- Robert Armstrong as Det. Tim Nolan

Featuring:

- Richard Davies as Happy Haskins, news photographer
- Joseph Crehan as Police Chief Martin O'Brien
- George Watts as Mayor Hansen
- Ralf Harolde as Chief Henchman Halliger
- William Haade as Henchman Mike Taboni
- John Gallaudet as Henchman Wilkerson
- George J. Lewis as Henchman Mason
- Victor Zimmerman as Henchman Bernard
- Johnnie Berkes as Newsboy–Henchman Grubb
- Edward Emerson as "Frenchy" Ludoc

With:

- Pat O'Malley as the Police Scientist
- Beatrice Roberts as the Chief's Secretary
- Riley Hill as Jim Bannister (Ch. 1)
- Grace Cunard as landlady (Ch. 1)
- Eddie Dean as Blair, ballistics expert (Chs. 1, 6)
- Eddie Foster as Henchman Jerry Rogan (Chs. 3–4)
- Stanley Price as Henchman Corky Watts (Chs. 4–5)
- Ethan Laidlaw as Ludoc's bartender (Chs. 5, 7–8)
- Mickey Simpson as Bruiser, Ludoc's bouncer (Ch. 7)
- Karl Hackett as Henry, crooked watchman (Chs. 7–8)
- Phil Warren as Henchman McKay (Chs. 8–9)
- Jack Mulhall as Chemist Richards (Chs. 9, 11)
- Jerry Jerome as Henchman Soupy Collins (Chs. 10–11)
- Paul McVey as Attorney J.B. "Harry" Malloy (Ch. 12)
- Dick Hogan as announcer during opening titles

== Production ==
Gang Busters is one of Universal's most elaborate serials, with many chase and thrill scenes expertly staged in outdoor locations. The directors were Ray Taylor, veteran director responsible for many hit serials, and Noel M. Smith, former silent-screen director who specialized in fast action (Smith directed many of Larry Semon's stunt-filled comedies of the 1920s). Some of the footage in Gang Busters was so good that Universal often reused it in its later cliffhangers.

Universal had been making adventure serials since the 1910s, and achieved major success with its Flash Gordon serials of the late 1930s. By the early 1940s, serials were usually shown to juvenile audiences at weekend matinees. Universal intended Gang Busters for adult audiences and possible weeknight showings, and staged the action as a straight crime drama. The studio introduced a new "Streamlined Serials" format to distinguish it from its previous chapter plays. Instead of beginning each chapter with a printed synopsis of the storyline, the new format had the action in each chapter starting immediately. The story characters were shown discussing the latest developments and recapping the story themselves.

As a publicity gimmick, Universal hired its "serial queen" of the 1910s, former action star Grace Cunard, to work in Gang Busters. She appears only in the first chapter, as the landlady of a boarding house, but she received prominent billing in the promotional posters and advertising.

== Critical reception ==
Gang Busters was very successful in its original release, and was re-released in 1949 by Film Classics, Inc.

Authors Jim Harmon and Donald F. Glut described Gang Busters as a "well made and interesting serial.", and William C. Cline considered the serial one of Universal's best and that Professor Mortis is one of the best characters ever created for a serial.

== Chapter titles ==
1. The League of Murdered Men
2. The Death Plunge
3. Murder Blockade
4. Hangman's Noose
5. Man Undercover
6. Under Crumbling Walls
7. The Water Trap
8. Murder by Proxy
9. Gang Bait
10. Mob Vengeance
11. Wanted at Headquarters
12. The Long Chance
13. Law and Order

_{Source:}

== See also ==
- List of film serials by year
- List of film serials by studio

Preceded by Don Winslow of the Navy (1942)	Universal Serial; Gang Busters (1942)	Succeeded by Junior G-Men of the Air (1942)
