= Six Gun Gospel =

1943 film directed by Lambert Hillyer

- Directed by: Lambert Hillyer
- Screenplay by: Adele Buffington; Ed Earl Repp
- Story by: Adele Buffington
- Produced by: Scott R. Dunlap
- Starring: Johnny Mack Brown; Raymond Hatton; Inna Gest; Eddie Dew; Kenneth MacDonald; Edmund Cobb
- Cinematography: Harry Neumann
- Edited by: Carl Pierson
- Music by: Edward J. Kay
- Production company: Monogram Pictures
- Distributed by: Monogram Pictures
- Release date: August 3, 1943
- Running time: 59 minutes
- Country: United States
- Language: English

Six Gun Gospel is a 1943 American Western film directed by Lambert Hillyer and written by Adele Buffington and Ed Earl Repp. This is the third film in the "Marshal Nevada Jack McKenzie" series, and stars Johnny Mack Brown as Jack McKenzie and Raymond Hatton as his sidekick Sandy Hopkins, with Inna Gest, Eddie Dew, Kenneth MacDonald and Edmund Cobb. The film was released on August 3, 1943, by Monogram Pictures.

== Cast ==
- Johnny Mack Brown as Nevada Jack McKenzie
- Raymond Hatton as Sandy Hopkins
- Inna Gest as Jane Simms
- Eddie Dew as Dan Baxter
- Kenneth MacDonald as Ace Benton
- Edmund Cobb as Waco
- Roy Barcroft as Durkin
- Bud Osborne as Joe
- Isabel Withers as Elvira
- Mary MacLaren as Mrs. Mary Dailey
- Jack Daley as Ben Dailey
- Artie Ortego as Ed
- Lynton Brent as Steve
- Milburn Morante as Zeke
- Kernan Cripps as Bill Simms
- Tom London as Murdered Gambler
