= Gun Code =

1940 film

- Directed by: Sam Newfield
- Written by: Joseph O'Donnell
- Produced by: Sigmund Neufeld
- Starring: Tim McCoy; Inna Gest; Carleton Young
- Cinematography: Jack Greenhalgh
- Edited by: Holbrook N. Todd
- Music by: Lew Porter
- Production company: Sigmund Neufeld Productions
- Distributed by: Producers Releasing Corporation
- Release date: August 3, 1940
- Running time: 54 minutes
- Country: United States
- Language: English

Gun Code is a 1940 American western film directed by Sam Newfield and starring Tim McCoy, Inna Gest and Carleton Young. It was distributed by the independent company PRC which specialized in handling low-budget second features. The film's sets were designed by the art director Fred Preble.

== Plot ==
The inhabitants of the town Miller Flats are intimidated by a gang running a protection racket. When the parson attempts to rally the townspeople against the gang he is killed by them. A marshal comes to town in disguise and joins forces with Betty Garrett the owner of the newspaper to bring down the racket.

== Cast ==
- Tim McCoy as Marshal Tim Hammond posing as Tim Hays
- Inna Gest as Betty Garrett
- Lou Fulton as Curley Haines
- Stephen Chase as James M. Bradley - Banker
- Carleton Young as Henchman Slim Doyle
- Ted Adams as Sheriff Kramer
- Robert Winkler as Jerry Garrett
- Dave O'Brien as Henchman Gale
- George Chesebro as Henchman Bart
- Jack Richardson as Mike McClure
- John Elliott as Parson A. Hammond
- Victor Adamson as Townsman
- Bob Burns as Townsman
- Budd Buster as Townsman
- Tex Cooper as Townsman
- Jack Evans as Henchman
- Herman Hack as Posse Rider

== Bibliography ==
- Pitts, Michael R. Western Movies: A Guide to 5,105 Feature Films. McFarland, 2012.
