= East Side Kids =

Characters in a series of films released by Monogram Pictures from 1940 through 1945

The East Side Kids were characters in a series of 22 films released by Monogram Pictures from 1940 through 1945. The series was a low-budget imitation of the Dead End Kids, a successful film franchise of the late 1930s.

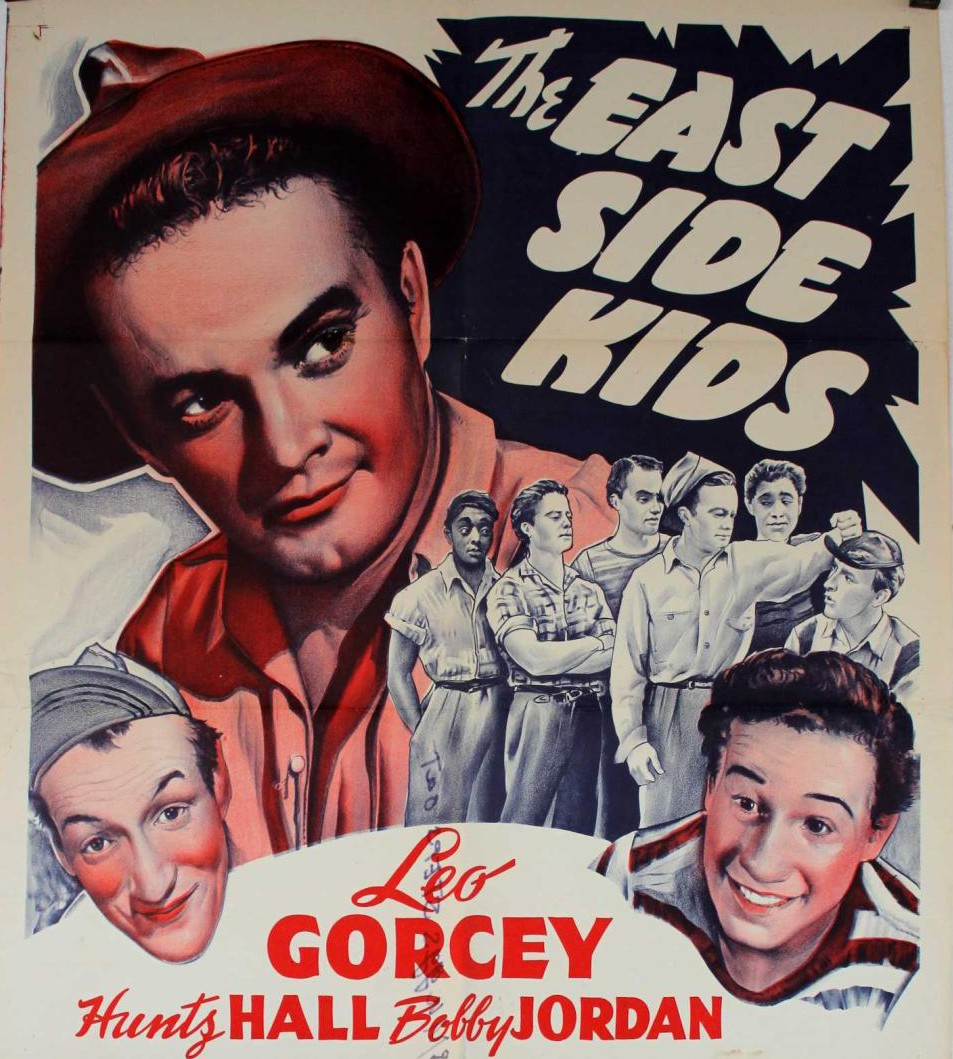
East Side Kids

== History ==
The 1935 Sidney Kingsley Broadway play Dead End was a portrait of life in the New York tenements, featuring six tough-talking juvenile delinquents. When film producer Samuel Goldwyn made a film out of the play, he recruited the six kids from the play: Leo Gorcey, Huntz Hall, Bobby Jordan, Gabriel Dell, Billy Halop, and Bernard Punsly. In 1938, Warner Brothers signed all six actors for a series of Dead End Kids dramas, the most successful being 1938's Angels with Dirty Faces with James Cagney and Humphrey Bogart, and They Made Me a Criminal in 1939, starring John Garfield.

Also in 1938, Universal Pictures offered a competing series, under the Little Tough Guys brand name. At one time or another, five of the original Dead End Kids, minus Gorcey, joined the series, resulting in the studio billing the gang as "The Dead End Kids and Little Tough Guys."

== The East Side Kids ==
In 1940 producer Sam Katzman, noting the financial success of other tough-kid series, made the film East Side Kids, using two of Universal's Little Tough Guys, Hally Chester and Harris Berger. He added former Our Gang player Donald Haines, Frankie Burke, radio actor Sam Edwards, and Eddie Brian to round out the new team. This was a one-shot film, designed to cash in on a popular trend. When Dead End Kids Leo Gorcey and Bobby Jordan became available, Katzman signed them for Boys of the City. "The East Side Kids" became a series, released by Monogram Pictures.

Monogram was a "budget" studio, making inexpensive films for double-feature theaters. Sam Katzman's productions were even cheaper. A typical major-studio "B" picture cost $200,000 to $300,000 to make, and was filmed in four weeks. Notorious penny-pincher Katzman spent only $33,000 per feature and made them in only five to seven days. He wasted no time or money on subtlety, story development, or more than two takes per scene.

Leo Gorcey's brother, David Gorcey of the Little Tough Guys, joined the series in 1940. "Sunshine Sammy" Morrison, the first child actor in the Our Gang comedies, was cast as "Scruno," the only African-American in the Jordan-Gorcey gang. Unlike other roles for African-American actors during this period, Morrison was on a more or less equal footing with the other kids.

In the first few films, Dave O'Brien, familiar to audiences from low-budget westerns and serials, and as the accident-prone star of the Pete Smith comedies, played Jordan's older brother Knuckles Dolan, who always seemed to be getting roped into chaperoning the kids from adventure to adventure. O'Brien appeared in different roles as well; the continuity between films was often ignored. As with the Little Tough Guys, the membership of the team changed from film to film, and sometimes even the names of the characters changed along the way. In total, 20 actors were members of the East Side Kids.

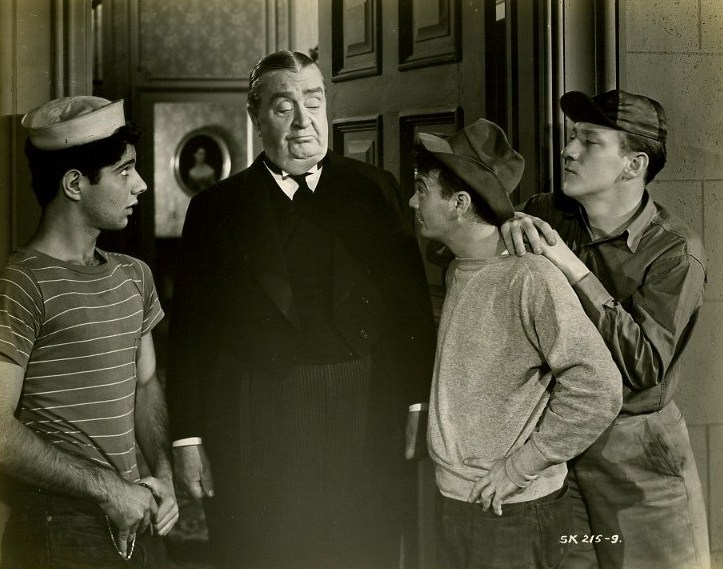
Bobby Stone, Robert Greig, Leo Gorcey, and Huntz Hall in the 1944 film Million Dollar Kid

Dead End Kid Gabriel Dell drifted in and out of the series as a gang member. Sometimes he took a character role as a small-time hoodlum, as in Smart Alecks, Mr. Muggs Steps Out, and Million Dollar Kid. Rising tough-teen actor Stanley Clements appeared in three films.

The stories always centered on the tough, pugnacious "Muggs McGinnis" (Gorcey) or the more innocent, clean-cut "Danny" (Bobby Jordan). Huntz Hall's "Glimpy" began as a minor character who grew in prominence as he was more opportunities for comedy over the course of the series. The loose format proved flexible enough to shift back and forth between urban drama (That Gang of Mine), murder mystery (Boys of the City), boxing melodrama (Bowery Blitzkrieg), and horror-comedy (Spooks Run Wild), with the kids confronting various stock villains (gangsters, smugglers, spies, crooked gamblers, swindlers) during their adventures.

The East Side films were problem-teen melodramas until 1943, when director William Beaudine joined the series and emphasized the comedy content. He encouraged the actors to improvise freely, adding to the films' spontaneous charm.

The advent of World War II affected the series and the cast. Four of the films involve enemy spies, Nazi intrigue, and American soldiers. Offscreen, between 1942 and 1944, cast members Morrison, Jordan, Dell, David Gorcey, and Billy Benedict left the series after being drafted. Leo Gorcey, a few days after receiving his own draft notice, suffered a near-fatal motorcycle accident. His injuries led to a 4-F classification, rendering him unfit for military service.

During Bobby Jordan's absence, his role in the series was taken by former child actor David Durand. Durand had been the star of Columbia's series of Glove Slingers campus comedies, and lent the same earnest sincerity to his East Side Kids appearances. Jordan returned in 1944, in uniform, for a guest appearance in Bowery Champs.

Starting with Clancy Street Boys in 1943, Bernard Gorcey, father of Leo and David, played various bit parts in seven East Side Kids films.

Given the low budgets, simplistic stories, and crude, assembly-line production of the East Side Kids series, its enduring popularity relies on the cast's rambunctious energy, breezy banter (often ad-libbed and containing inside jokes), fast-paced action, and Leo Gorcey's trademark malaprops, like "This calls for drastic measurements."

By 1945 Leo Gorcey had asserted himself as the top-billed star of the series, now billed as "Leo Gorcey and The East Side Kids", and insisted that producer Sam Katzman double Gorcey's $5,000 salary. Katzman, always cash-conscious, flatly refused and stopped the series after 1945's Come Out Fighting. Undaunted, Gorcey and Bobby Jordan retooled the series as The Bowery Boys. They recruited Huntz Hall, Gabriel Dell, Billy Benedict, and David Gorcey from The East Side Kids, and Monogram released the films at the same established rate of four per year until January 1958.

== Revivals ==
The East Side Kids came back to theaters beginning in 1949, through Astor Pictures, Favorite Films, and Savoy Films, the latter two companies owned by former Monogram executives. The second-run East Side films were a cheaper alternative to the first-run Bowery Boys films, and were programmed regularly in kiddie-matinée shows and action houses into the 1950s. The East Side films were also early arrivals on television, and were widely syndicated at a time when the major studios had not yet offered their film libraries to television. The films became perennials in the early days of home video; almost all of the East Side Kids films are still in circulation today.

== List of East Side Kids ==
- Leo Gorcey as Ethelbert 'Muggs' (or 'Mugs') McGinnis (Maloney in early films) (1940–1945)
- Huntz Hall as Glimpy (Limpy in Bowery Blitzkrieg) (1941–1945)
- Bobby Jordan as Danny (1940–1943) and Bobby (1944)
- Gabriel Dell as Pinky or various characters (1942–1945)
- "Sunshine Sammy" Morrison as Scruno (1940–1944)
- Billy Benedict as Skinny and others (1943-1945)
- David Gorcey as Pete in Boys of the City (1940) and Peewee (1940–1942)
- Donald Haines as Peewee in East Side Kids and Boys of the City (both 1940) and Skinny (1940–1941)
- Stanley Clements as Stash (1942–1943)
- Bobby Stone as Rocky or other characters (1940–1944)
- Dave Durand as Skinny in Kid Dynamite (1943) and Danny (1943-1944)
- Johnny Duncan as various characters (1944–1945)
- Eugene Francis as Algernon "Algy" Wilkes (1940–1941)
- Buddy Gorman as various characters (1943–1945)
- Jimmy Strand as Danny or various characters (1943–1945)
- Mendie Koenig as various characters (1945)
- Hally Chester as Fred "Dutch" Kuhn in East Side Kids and Buster in Boys of the City (both 1940)
- Frankie Burke as Skinny in East Side Kids and Boys of the City (both 1940)
- Bennie Bartlett (or Benny Bartlett) as Beanie or Benny in Kid Dynamite and Clancy Street Boys (both 1943)
- Harris Berger as Danny in East Side Kids (1940)
- Eddie Brian as Mike in East Side Kids (1940)
- Jack Edwards as Algernon 'Mouse' Wilkes in East Side Kids (1940)
- Sam Edwards as Pete in East Side Kids (1940)
- Bill Lawrence as Skinny in Mr. Wise Guy (1942)
- Dick Chandlee as Skinny (a.k.a. 'Stash') in Clancy Street Boys (1943)
- Eddie Mills as Dave in Clancy Street Boys (1943)
- Bill Bates as Dave (a.k.a. 'Sleepy') in Ghosts on the Loose (1943)
- Al Stone as Herbie in Million Dollar Kid (1944)
- Bill Chaney as Tobey in Block Busters (1944)
- Leo Borden as Pete (a.k.a. 'Aristotles') in Docks of New York (1945)

== Filmography ==
Year	Title	Director	Screenplay	Story
1940	East Side Kids	Robert F. Hill	William Lively	William Lively
1940	Boys of the City	Joseph H. Lewis	William Lively	William Lively
1940	That Gang of Mine	Joseph H. Lewis	William Lively	Alan Whitman
1940	Pride of the Bowery	Joseph H. Lewis	George H. Plympton; William Lively (adaptation)	Steven Clensos
1941	Flying Wild	William West	Al Martin	Al Martin
1941	Bowery Blitzkrieg	Wallace Fox	Sam Robins	Brendan Wood; Donn Mullahy
1941	Spooks Run Wild	Phil Rosen	Carl Foreman; Charles R. Marion	Carl Foreman; Charles R. Marion
1942	Mr. Wise Guy	William Nigh	Sam Robins; Harvey Gates; Jack Henley	Martin Mooney
1942	Let's Get Tough!	Wallace Fox	Harvey Gates	Harvey Gates
1942	Smart Alecks	Wallace Fox	Harvey Gates	Harvey Gates
1942	'Neath Brooklyn Bridge	Wallace Fox	Harvey Gates	Harvey Gates
1943	Kid Dynamite	Wallace Fox	Gerald Schnitzer; Morey Amsterdam (dialogue)	Paul Ernst
1943	Clancy Street Boys	William Beaudine	Harvey Gates	Harvey Gates
1943	Ghosts on the Loose	William Beaudine	Kenneth Higgins	Kenneth Higgins
1943	Mr. Muggs Steps Out	William Beaudine	William Beaudine; Beryl Sachs	William Beaudine; Beryl Sachs
1944	Million Dollar Kid	Wallace Fox	Frank H. Young	Frank H. Young
1944	Follow the Leader	William Beaudine	William Beaudine; Beryl Sachs	Ande Lamb
1944	Block Busters	Wallace Fox	Houston Branch	Houston Branch
1944	Bowery Champs	William Beaudine	Earle Snell; Morey Amsterdam (dialogue)	Earle Snell
1945	Docks of New York	Wallace Fox	Harvey Gates	Harvey Gates
1945	Mr. Muggs Rides Again	Wallace Fox	Harvey Gates	Harvey Gates
1945	Come Out Fighting	William Beaudine	Earle Snell	Earle Snell

== See also ==
- Dead End Kids
- Little Tough Guys
- The Bowery Boys

Preceded by Little Tough Guys; 1938–1943	East Side Kids; 1940–1945	Succeeded by The Bowery Boys; 1946–1958
