= Frankie Burke =

American actor

- Born: Francis Vaselle; June 6, 1915; Brooklyn, New York, U.S.
- Died: April 7, 1983 (aged 67); Chapman, Kansas, U.S.
- Occupation: Film actor
- Years active: 1938-1941

Frankie Burke (June 6, 1915 – April 7, 1983) was a Hollywood actor, best known for his appearance as a member of The East Side Kids.

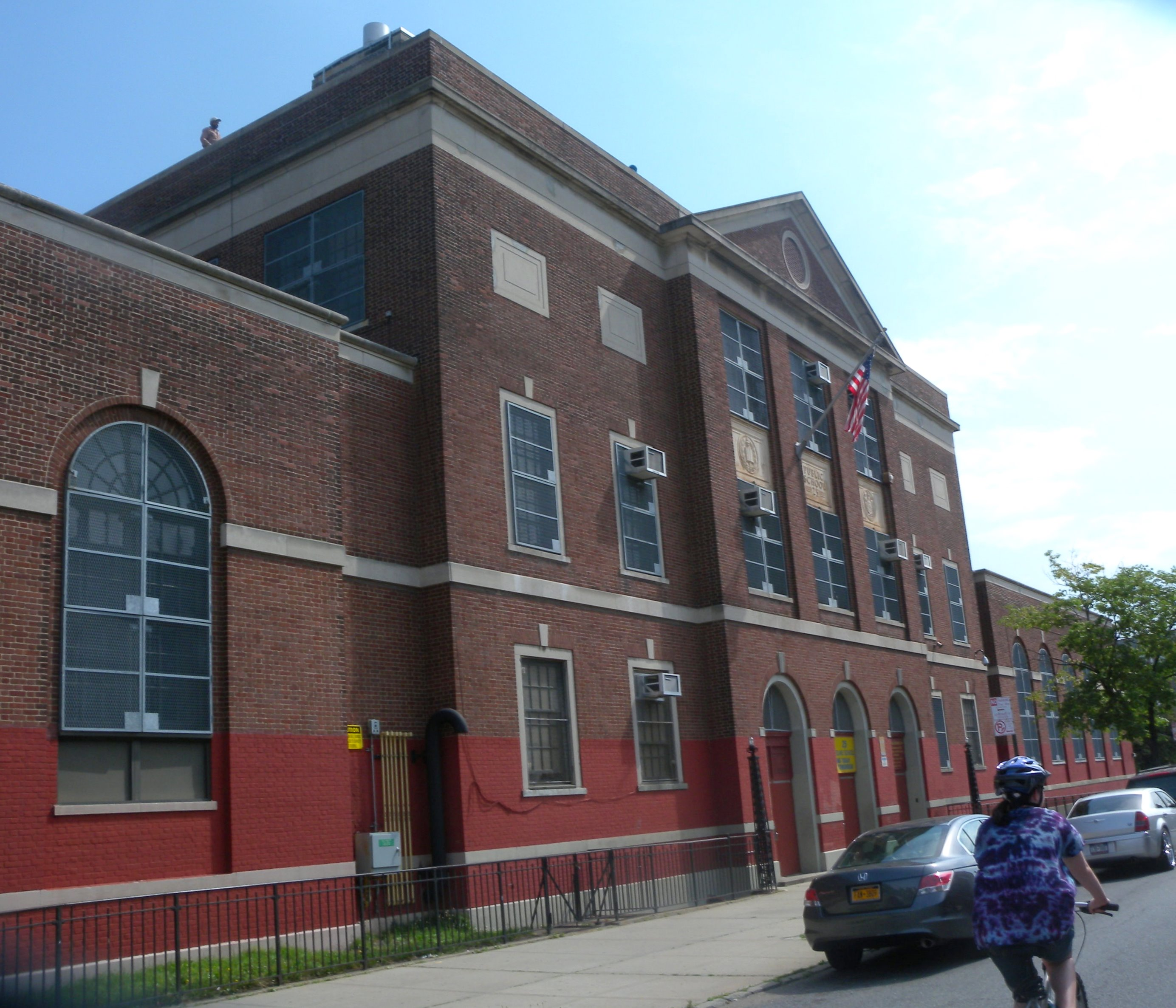
PS 25, Brooklyn

== Early life ==
Burke was born Frankie Vaselle and grew up in Brooklyn, New York. His name was changed when he began working in films. Burke went to P.S. 25. He grew up watching James Cagney on film in local theaters and, having been told many times how much he resembled him, figured if Cagney could become famous, so could he. Burke sold newspapers on the street corners before deciding to hitchhike to Hollywood in 1937 to meet Cagney, but when the first attempt failed, he went back to Brooklyn.

In 1937, Burke worked as a bellhop at a hotel in Las Vegas, Nevada.

== Life in Hollywood ==
He was discovered by a Warner Brothers talent scout, out searching for young men who resembled Cagney for a role in 1938's Angels with Dirty Faces. He went on to do eighteen more films, several of which were uncredited, before his last role in 1941's Shadow of the Thin Man.

== Death ==
Burke died of lung cancer in 1983. He was survived by one son.

== Filmography ==
| Year | Film | Role | Notes |
|---|---|---|---|
| 1938 | Angels with Dirty Faces | Young Rocky | |
| 1939 | Off the Record | Reform school inmate | Uncredited |
| 1939 | Nancy Drew... Reporter | Bellboy | Uncredited |
| 1939 | The Adventures of Jane Arden | Western Union messenger | Uncredited |
| 1939 | You Can't Get Away with Murder | Billiard player | Uncredited |
| 1939 | Women in the Wind | Johnnie | |
| 1939 | Sweepstakes Winner | Chalky Williams | |
| 1939 | Hell's Kitchen | Soap | |
| 1939 | Everybody's Hobby | C.C.C. Youth | Uncredited |
| 1939 | You Can't Get Away with Murder | Billiard Player | Uncredited |
| 1939 | Angels Wash Their Faces | Reform School Boy Making Knife | Uncredited |
| 1939 | Pride of the Blue Grass | Willie Hobson | |
| 1940 | East Side Kids | Skinny | |
| 1940 | Boys of the City | Skinny | |
| 1940 | Fugitive from a Prison Camp | Sobby Taylor | |
| 1940 | The Quarterback | 'Slats' Finney | |
| 1941 | Ride, Kelly, Ride | Skeeziks O'Day | |
| 1941 | Model Wife | Messenger boy | Uncredited |
| 1941 | Shadow of the Thin Man | Bobby Burns | Uncredited, final film role |
