= Ship of Wanted Men =

1933 American crime film

- Directed by: Lewis D. Collins
- Written by: Ethel Hill
- Produced by: Al Alt
- Starring: Dorothy Sebastian; Fred Kohler; Leon Ames
- Cinematography: George Meehan
- Edited by: Rose Smith
- Production company: Showmen's Pictures
- Distributed by: Marcy Pictures Corporation
- Release date: September 9, 1933
- Running time: 63 minutes
- Country: United States
- Language: English

Ship of Wanted Men is a 1933 American pre-Code crime film directed by Lewis D. Collins and starring Dorothy Sebastian, Fred Kohler and Leon Ames. The film's sets were designed by the art director Fred Preble.

== Plot ==
A gang of fugitives hijack a ship and make for a Pacific island that has no extradition treaty with the United States.

== Cast ==
- Dorothy Sebastian as Irene Reynolds
- Fred Kohler as Chuck Young
- Leon Ames as Capt. John Holden
- Gertrude Astor as Vera
- Maurice Black as George Spinoli
- James Flavin as Frank Busch
- Jason Robards Sr. as John Craig
- Herbert Evans as Duke Finley
- John Ince as Elderly Man
- Kit Guard as Crewman
- George 'Gabby' Hayes as Crewman

== Bibliography ==
- Michael R. Pitts. Poverty Row Studios, 1929–1940: An Illustrated History of 55 Independent Film Companies, with a Filmography for Each. McFarland & Company, 2005.
