= Sweepstakes Winner =

1939 film by William C. McGann

- Directed by: William C. McGann
- Screenplay by: John W. Krafft
- Story by: Hugh Cummings; Albert DeMond
- Produced by: Bryan Foy
- Starring: Marie Wilson; Johnnie Davis; Allen Jenkins; Charley Foy; Jerry Colonna; Frankie Burke
- Cinematography: Arthur Edeson
- Edited by: Frank Magee
- Music by: Howard Jackson
- Production company: Warner Bros. Pictures
- Distributed by: Warner Bros. Pictures
- Release date: May 20, 1939
- Running time: 59 minutes
- Country: United States
- Language: English

Sweepstakes Winner is a 1939 American comedy film directed by William C. McGann, written by John W. Krafft, and starring Marie Wilson, Johnnie Davis, Allen Jenkins, Charley Foy, Jerry Colonna and Frankie Burke. It was released by Warner Bros. Pictures on May 20, 1939.

== Plot ==
A naive girl, Jennie, inherits $1,000 from her grandfather, who tells her to buy a particular racehorse with it. His instructions send her to two broke bookies. They tell her she need $5,000 to buy the horse and offer to bet it for her on a 5 to 1 horse in a race that day. That horse wins, but one of the bookies, Jinx Donovan, followed a bad tip and instead bet $500 on a loser. Rather than admit he lost the money, he arranges to have her robbed just after he returned the remaining $500 to her in a wad to look like the $5,000. Down to her last few dollars, Jennie gets a job as a waitress. The bookies eat a meal at the restaurant. Too broke to pay for it, they sell her an Irish Sweepstakes ticket for $10 and the meal. The ticket wins the first round, meaning she would win a huge cash prize if her horse won the sweepstakes race. She is offered cash for the ticket, but decided to rely on her luck instead.

== Cast ==
- Marie Wilson as Jennie Jones
- Johnnie Davis as Mark Downe
- Allen Jenkins as Xerxes 'Tip' Bailey
- Charley Foy as 'Jinx' Donovan
- Sam McDaniel as Mose
- Jerry Colonna as Nick
- Frankie Burke as Chalky Williams
- Vera Lewis as Mrs. McCarthy
- Granville Bates as Pop Reynolds
- Eddie Kane as Mr. Blake
- Bert Hanlon as Poolroom Guard
- George Lloyd as Dutch
- Sidney Bracey as Mr. Simpkins
- Charles Irwin as English Radio Announcer
- Bernice Pilot as Martha (Uncredited)
