= Trail to San Antone =

1947 film by John English

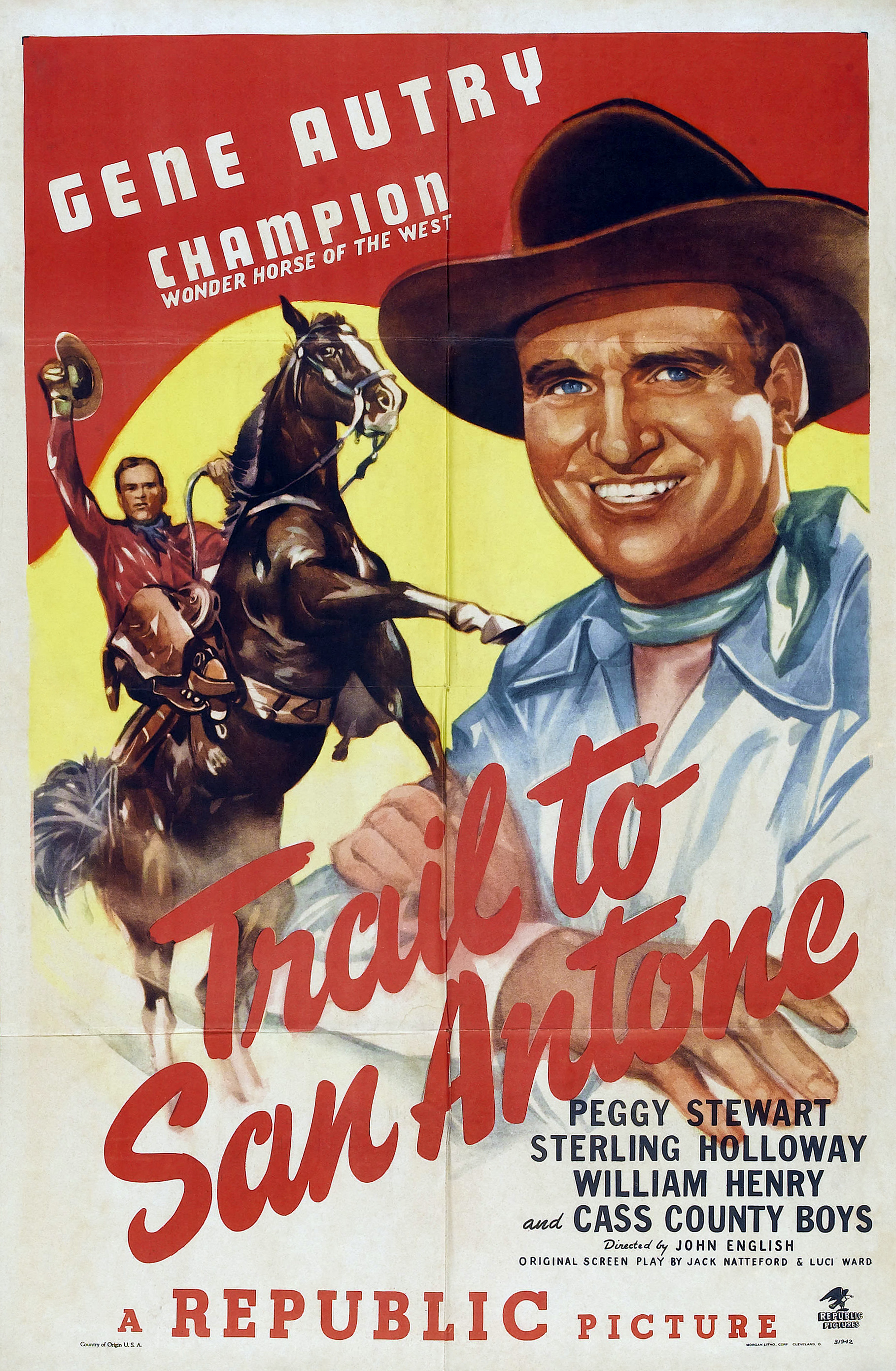
- Theatrical release poster
- Directed by: John English
- Screenplay by: Jack Natteford; Luci Ford
- Produced by: Armand Schaefer
- Starring: Gene Autry; Peggy Stewart; Sterling Holloway; William "Bill" Henry; Johnny Duncan; Tris Coffin
- Cinematography: William Bradford
- Edited by: Charles Craft
- Music by: Joseph Dubin
- Production company: Republic Pictures
- Distributed by: Republic Pictures
- Release date: January 25, 1947
- Running time: 67 minutes
- Country: United States
- Language: English

Trail to San Antone is a 1947 American Western film directed by John English, written by Jack Natteford and Luci Ford, and starring Gene Autry, Peggy Stewart, Sterling Holloway, William "Bill" Henry, Johnny Duncan and Tris Coffin. It was released on January 25, 1947, by Republic Pictures.

It was filmed in Lone Pine, California and at Deerwood Stock Farm in Thousand Oaks, California.

== Plot ==
Gene tries to help a young jockey get back on track after an "accident" arranged by an unscrupulous horse trainer ruins his career. When a wild stallion runs away with the speedy mare he plans for the jockey to ride, so Gene takes off in an airplane to bring them back.

== Cast ==
- Gene Autry as Gene Autry
- Peggy Stewart as Kit Barlow
- Sterling Holloway as Droopy Stearns
- William "Bill" Henry as Rick Malloy
- Johnny Duncan as Ted Malloy
- Tris Coffin as Cal Young
- Dorothy Vaughan as The Commodore
- Edward Keane as Sheriff Jones
- Ralph Peters as Storekeeper Sam
- The Cass County Boys as Singing Ranch Hands
