= That Gang of Mine =

1940 film by Joseph H. Lewis

- VHS cover
- Directed by: Joseph H. Lewis
- Written by: William Lively (screenplay); Alan Whitman(story)
- Produced by: Sam Katzman
- Starring: Leo Gorcey; Bobby Jordan
- Cinematography: Robert E. Cline; Harvey Gould
- Edited by: Carl Pierson
- Music by: Lew Porter
- Distributed by: Monogram Pictures Corporation
- Release date: September 23, 1940
- Running time: 62 min.
- Country: United States
- Language: English

That Gang of Mine is a 1940 film directed by Joseph H. Lewis and starring Leo Gorcey and Bobby Jordan. It is the third film in the East Side Kids series.

== Plot ==
Old horseman Ben brings his beloved thoroughbred Bluenight to New York from Kentucky in hopes of developing him into a championship racer. Because the old man is down on his luck, the East Side boys offer to provide a makeshift quarters for Bluenight, and Algy Wilkes persuades his father to put up the entrance fee for the horse. Muggs Maloney, an aspiring but untested jockey, rides Bluenight in the race, but loses his nerve on the track, causing Bluenight to trail in the field. Seated in the stands is Morgan, a respected trainer, who recognizes the horse's ability and urges Mr. Wilkes to race the horse with an experienced jockey. However, Muggs insists upon doing the riding, and his pals induce Mr. Wilkes to give him another chance. Complications arise the night before the race when Nick, a crooked bookie, tries to sabotage Bluenight. The boys discover the plot and save the horse, but the next day, Muggs realizes that he cannot guide the horse to victory. With the use of his fists, he convinces jockey Jimmy Sullivan to take his place, and Bluenight finishes the race the winner.

== Cast ==
=== The East Side Kids ===
- Bobby Jordan as Danny Dolan
- Leo Gorcey as Muggs Maloney
- Sunshine Sammy as Scruno
- David Gorcey as Peewee
- Donald Haines as Skinny
- Eugene Francis as Algy Wilkes

=== Remaining cast ===
- Clarence Muse as Ben
- Dave O'Brien as 'Knuckles' Dolan
- Joyce Bryant as Louise
- Milton Kibbee as Mr. Wilkes
- Richard Terry as Henchman Blackie
- Wilbur Mack as Nick Buffalo
- Hazel Keener as Mrs. Wilkes
- Forrest Taylor as Horse Trainer Morgan (uncredited)
- Nick Wall as Jockey Jimmy Sullivan (uncredited)
- Victor Adamson as Turf Club Extra

== Crew ==
- Associate Producer: Pete Mayer
- Set Decoration: Fred Preble
- Production Management: Ed W. Rote
- Second Unit Director/Assistant Director: Arthur Hammond, Herman Pett
- Sound Recordist: Glen Glenn
