= Amelita Ward =

American actress

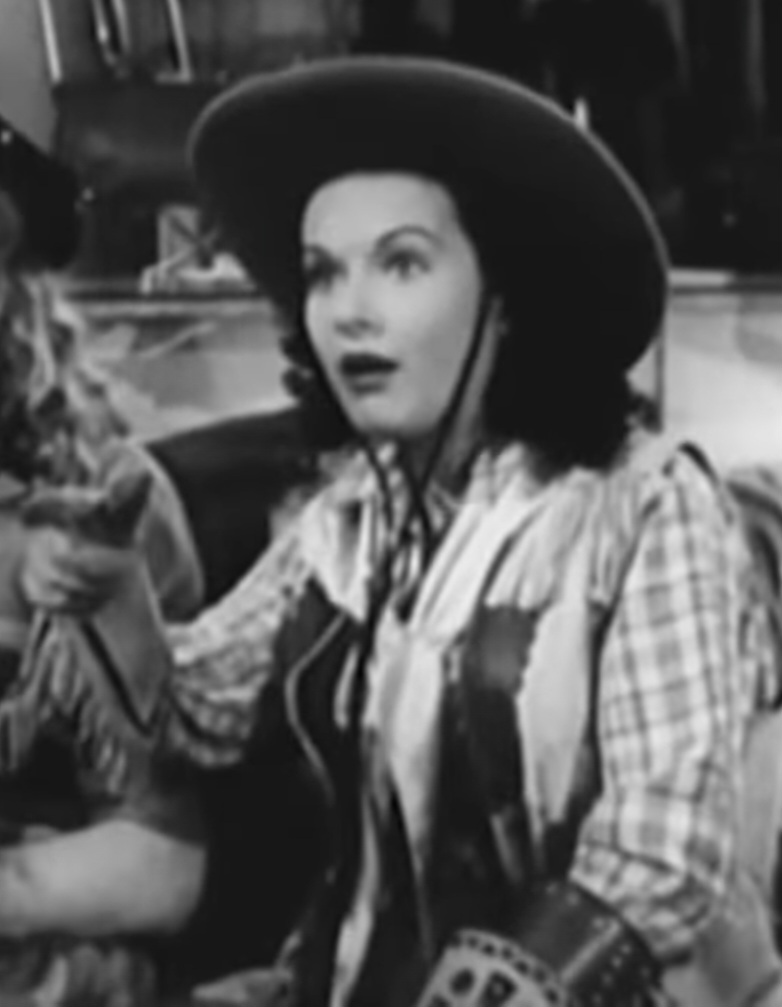
- Ward in Clancy Street Boys (1943)
- Born: July 17, 1923
- Died: April 26, 1987 (aged 63)
- Resting place: Ivy Hill Cemetery (Alexandria, Virginia)
- Other name: Lita Ward
- Occupation: Actress
- Years active: 1943–1949
- Spouse: Leo Gorcey (m. 1949; div. 1956)
- Children: 2

Amelita Ward (July 17, 1923 – April 26, 1987) was an American film actress. She played supporting roles in over 20 films between 1943 and 1949, generally in B Pictures such as Gangway for Tomorrow and The Falcon in Danger (1943). She was sometimes credited as Lita Ward.

== Life and career ==
Ward's father was Claude "Bud" Ward, a production manager for NBC.

Two producers discovered Ward while they were in Harlingen, Texas, filming scenes on location. That led to her first film role, in Aerial Gunner (1943).

Ward married Leo Gorcey on February 10, 1949, in Ensenada, Mexico. They had two children and later divorced in February 1956.

== Filmography ==
Year	Title	Role	Notes
1943	Aerial Gunner	Peggy Lunt	
1943	Clancy Street Boys	Judy Monahan	
1943	The Sky's the Limit	Southern Girl	Uncredited
1943	The Falcon in Danger	Bonnie Caldwell	
1943	Let's Face It	Chorus Girl	Uncredited
1943	Gangway for Tomorrow	Mary Jones	
1943	The Falcon and the Co-eds	Jane Harris	
1944	Seven Days Ashore	Lucy Banning	
1944	Gildersleeve's Ghost	Marie	
1945	Rough, Tough and Ready	Kitty Duval	
1945	The Jungle Captive	Ann Forrester	
1945	Swingin' on a Rainbow	Barbara Marsden	
1945	Come Out Fighting	Rita Joyce	
1945	Who's Guilty?	Ruth Allen	
1946	The Best Years of Our Lives	Counter Girl	Uncredited
1947	When a Girl's Beautiful	Bunty McGregor	
1948	Smugglers' Cove	Teresa Mahoney	
1949	Rim of the Canyon	Lily	Uncredited
1949	Slattery's Hurricane	Marie	Uncredited, (final film role)

== Bibliography ==
- Fyne, Robert. Long Ago and Far Away: Hollywood and the Second World War. Scarecrow Press, 2008.
