= East Side Kids (film) =

1940 film by Robert F. Hill

- DVD cover
- Directed by: Robert F. Hill
- Written by: William Lively
- Produced by: Sam Katzman
- Starring: Leon Ames; Dennis Moore; Joyce Bryant; East Side Kids
- Cinematography: Art Reed
- Edited by: Earl Turner
- Music by: Johnny Lange; Lew Porter
- Distributed by: Monogram Pictures Corporation
- Release date: February 10, 1940 (U.S.)
- Running time: 62 minutes
- Country: United States
- Language: English

East Side Kids is a 1940 film and the first in the East Side Kids film series. It is the only one not to star any of the original six Dead End Kids. The film was released by producer Sam Katzman. This was also his first project at Monogram Pictures, which he joined shortly after the folding of his company Victory Pictures.

== Plot ==
Police officer Pat O'Day, a former child of the tenements, tries to reform a gang of street kids by involving them in a boys' police club. When club member Danny Dolan's brother Knuckles is sentenced to death row for killing a treasury agent, Pat vows to help Danny clear his brother, whom he believes is innocent, but before he can begin his investigation, the police commissioner demotes him to walking a beat. Meanwhile, a counterfeiting ring composed of Mileaway Harris, a former tenement kid, Morris, and his girl friend May sets up shop in shopkeeper's Schmidt's, basement. Feeling threatened by Pat, Morris schemes to discredit the policeman by posing as a businessman who wants to hire Pat's boys to distribute advertising leaflets. Unknown to Pat, Morris places bogus five dollar bills in the pay envelopes, and when the boys are caught passing fake money, Pat is implicated in the counterfeiting scheme. To prove his innocence, Pat takes to the streets, and Danny, still unaware of Morris' involvement in the counterfeiting ring, agrees to deliver a suitcase for him to May. A policeman follows Danny to May's apartment, where they are greeted by Mileaway, who kills the policeman and takes Danny hostage. As they drive across town, Danny learns that it was Mileaway who killed the treasury agent and framed Knuckles. Pat tracks down Mileaway's car, and in the ensuing chase, Mileaway escapes and kills Schmidt. Pat and the kids chase Mileaway to a rooftop, where Dutch, Danny's friend, struggles with Mileaway. When they both fall to the sidewalk, Dutch is killed; but Mileaway lives to confess to the agent's murder, and all ends happily as both Knuckles and Pat are exonerated.

== Cast ==
=== The East Side Kids ===
- Hal E. Chester as Fred "Dutch" Kuhn
- Harris Berger as Danny Dolan
- Frankie Burke as Skinny
- Jack Edwards as Algernon 'Mouse' Wilkes
- Donald Haines as Peewee
- Eddie Brian as Mike
- Sam Edwards as Pete

=== Remaining Cast ===
- Leon Ames as Pat O'Day
- Dennis Moore as Milton 'Mileway' Harris
- Joyce Bryant as Molly Dolan
- Vince Barnett as Whisper
- Dave O'Brien as 'Knuckles' Dolan
- Ted Adams as Schmidt
- Maxine Leslie as May
- Robert Fiske as Cornwall
- Jim Farley as Police Captain Moran
- Alden 'Stephen' Chase as Detective Joe
- Fred Hoose as Mr. Wilkes
- Eric Burtis as Eric
- Frank Yaconelli as Tony the grocer

== Crew ==
- Directed by: Robert F. Hill
- Screenplay by: William Lively
- Produced by: Sam Katzman
- Music composed by: Johnny Lange, Lew Porter
- Film editing by: Earl Turner
- Cinematography by: Arthur Reed
- Production Management: Ed W. Rote
- Assistant Director: Glenn Cook
- Sound: Glen Glenn

== Home media ==
The film was originally released on DVD by Alpha Video on June 24, 2003 and has since been re-released multiple times by a variety of manufacturers.
