= Under Fiesta Stars =

1941 film by Frank McDonald

- Theatrical release poster
- Directed by: Frank McDonald
- Screenplay by: Karl Brown; Eliot Gibbons
- Story by: Karl Brown
- Produced by: Harry Grey
- Starring: Gene Autry; Smiley Burnette; Carol Hughes
- Cinematography: Harry Neumann
- Edited by: Tony Martinelli
- Music by: Raoul Kraushaar (supervisor)
- Production company: Republic Pictures
- Distributed by: Republic Pictures
- Release date: August 25, 1941 (U.S.)
- Running time: 65 minutes
- Country: United States
- Language: English

Under Fiesta Stars is a 1941 American Western film directed by Frank McDonald and starring Gene Autry, Smiley Burnette, and Carol Hughes. Based on a story by Karl Brown, the film is about a singing cowboy and rodeo champion who inherits a ranch and mining property along with his foster father's niece. She wants to sell but needs his consent, and he wants to work the mine according to his foster father's wishes. Problems arise when the niece unwittingly gets involved with unscrupulous lawyers who are plotting to steal the mine. The film features the songs "Purple Sage in the Twilight", "When You're Smiling", and the title song.

== Plot ==
Singing cowboy and rodeo star Gene Autry (Gene Autry) inherits half interest of a ranch and mining property from his late foster father, Henry "Dad" Erwin. The other half is left to Dad's niece, Barbara Erwin (Carol Hughes) who arrives at the ranch from the East with her friend, Kitty Callahan (Pauline Drake). The will stipulates that each has an "undivided interest" in the inheritance—that each owns half of everything—and that nothing can be sold off without the approval of the other. In desperate need of money, Barbara expresses her desire to sell the mine as quickly as possible. Gene, however, wants to continue Dad's work on the mine, which employs Mexican rancheros whose land was ruined by dust storms. He explains that although the profits are currently put back into operations, eventually the mine will provide her with an income, and that without the mine, the rancheros will not survive.

With not enough money to return East, Barbara and Kitty decide to stay, and plan to use their feminine wiles on Gene and his sidekick, Frog Millhouse (Smiley Burnette), to get gene to change his mind about selling. Meanwhile, Gene assures the rancheros that the mine will not be sold and that he will continue Dad Erwin's work. After her sweet-talking fails to win Gene over to her side, Barbara hires attorneys Arnold and Fry to sell the mine for her, giving them the power of attorney. Unknown to Barbara, the unscrupulous lawyers have been trying for years to gain control of the mine. They order their henchman Tommick (John Merton) to get rid of Gene. Tommick and his gang ride out to the mine and initiate a gunfight, but Gene and the rancheros are able to defend themselves.

Back at the ranch, Gene grows frustrated with Barbara and Kitty who have drawn a line down the middle of Dad's house—dividing it exactly in half. Barbara begins to have doubts about selling the mine after one of the rancheros names his newborn daughter after her in gratitude for not selling the mine. Meanwhile, Tommick and his men cause an explosion in the mine that seriously injures ranchero Jose Ortega. When Ortega's wife blames Gene in front of everyone, Barbara defends him. Realizing she's fallen in love with him, she tells Gene, "You're not alone and you're not selling the mine." Later, she tells Arnold and Fry that she no longer wants to sell. Pretending they want to help her, they tell her to send Gene alone to meet them at the mine the following day to discuss a business opportunity.

The next day, Gene, Barbara, Frog, and Kitty go on a picnic, during which Barbara tells Gene about the business meeting he must attend at the mine. Soon after Gene rides off, Dad's lawyer arrives and expresses concern when he learns about Barbara's dealings with Arnold and Fry. Fearing for Gene's safety, they all ride out to the mine, where they find Gene has fought and captured Arnold, who just tried to kill him. At first Gene suspects that Barbara was in on the trap, but when Fry, Tommick, and his gang arrive, she and Gene and the others are forced back into the mine. During the shootout that follows, Frog's young brother Tadpole climbs out of the mine through a ventilation shaft and rides off to find help. Just as Gene is about to run out of ammunition, Tadpole returns with the rancheros who help Gene capture Arnold and his gang of criminals.

Afterwards at a fiesta, Gene sings a beautiful song to Barbara and romances her, Frog and Kitty share loving glances, and even Tadpole changes his mind about women and goes off with a pretty señorita.

== Cast ==
- Gene Autry as Gene Autry
- Smiley Burnette as Frog Millhouse
- Carol Hughes as Barbara "Babs" Erwin
- Frank Darien as Benjamin Peabody
- Joe Strauch Jr. as Tadpole Millhouse
- Pauline Drake as Kitty Callahan
- Ivan Miller as Arnold
- Sam Flint as Fry
- Elias Gamboa as Jose Ortego
- John Merton as Henchman Tommick
- Jack Kirk as Sheriff
- Inez Palange as Mrs. Romero
- Champion as Gene's Horse (uncredited)

== Production ==
=== Casting ===
Under Fiesta Stars was the third Gene Autry film featuring leading lady Carol Hughes, preceded by Gold Mine in the Sky (1938) and Man from Music Mountain (1938). Born January 17, 1910 in Chicago, Hughes married comic actor Frank Faylen in 1929. After appearing in stock and vaudeville for several years, she began her film career in 1935 playing bit parts and supporting roles. In 1940, she replaced Jean Rogers in the role of Dale Arden in the third and last of Universal's Flash Gordon serials, Flash Gordon's Trip to Mars. She retired from films in the early 1950s. The mother of actress Carol Faylen, who appeared in the 1964 TV sitcom The Bing Crosby Show as Crosby's daughter Joyce, Hughes was also the former mother-in-law of talkshow host Regis Philbin. She died in 1995 at the age of 85.

=== Filming and budget ===
Under Fiesta Stars was filmed July 8–22, 1941. The film had an operating budget of $81,812 (equal to $1,790,794 today), and a negative cost of $81,916.

=== Stuntwork ===
- Yakima Canutt
- Tommy Coats
- Bob Folkerson
- Claire Friend (Carol Hughes' stunt double)
- Ralph Gomez
- George Havens (Joe Strauch Jr.'s stunt double)
- Frank McCarroll
- Tex Terry (Smiley Burnette's stunt double)
- Joe Yrigoyen (Gene Autry's stunt double)

=== Filming locations ===
- Bronson Canyon, Griffith Park, 4730 Crystal Springs Drive, Los Angeles, California, USA
- Bronson Caves, Bronson Canyon, Griffith Park, 4730 Crystal Springs Drive, Los Angeles, California, USA
- Iverson Ranch, 1 Iverson Lane, Chatsworth, Los Angeles, California, USA
- Reuss Ranch, Malibu Lake, Los Angeles, California, USA
- Deerwood Stock Farm, Thousand Oaks, California, USA

=== Soundtrack ===
- "The Man on the Flying Trapeze" (Walter O'Keefe) by Gene Autry, Smiley Burnette, Joe Strauch Jr., and others
- "Keep It in the Family" (Smiley Burnette) by Smiley Burnette and Joe Strauch Jr.
- "Purple Sage in the Twilight" (Jule Styne, Sol Meyer, Gene Autry) by Gene Autry
- "I've Got No Use for Women" (Sol Meyer) by Gene Autry
- "When You're Smiling" (Mark Fisher, Joe Goodwin, Larry Shay) by Gene Autry
- "Under Fiesta Stars" (Gene Autry, Fred Rose) by Gene Autry
