= Purple Death from Outer Space =

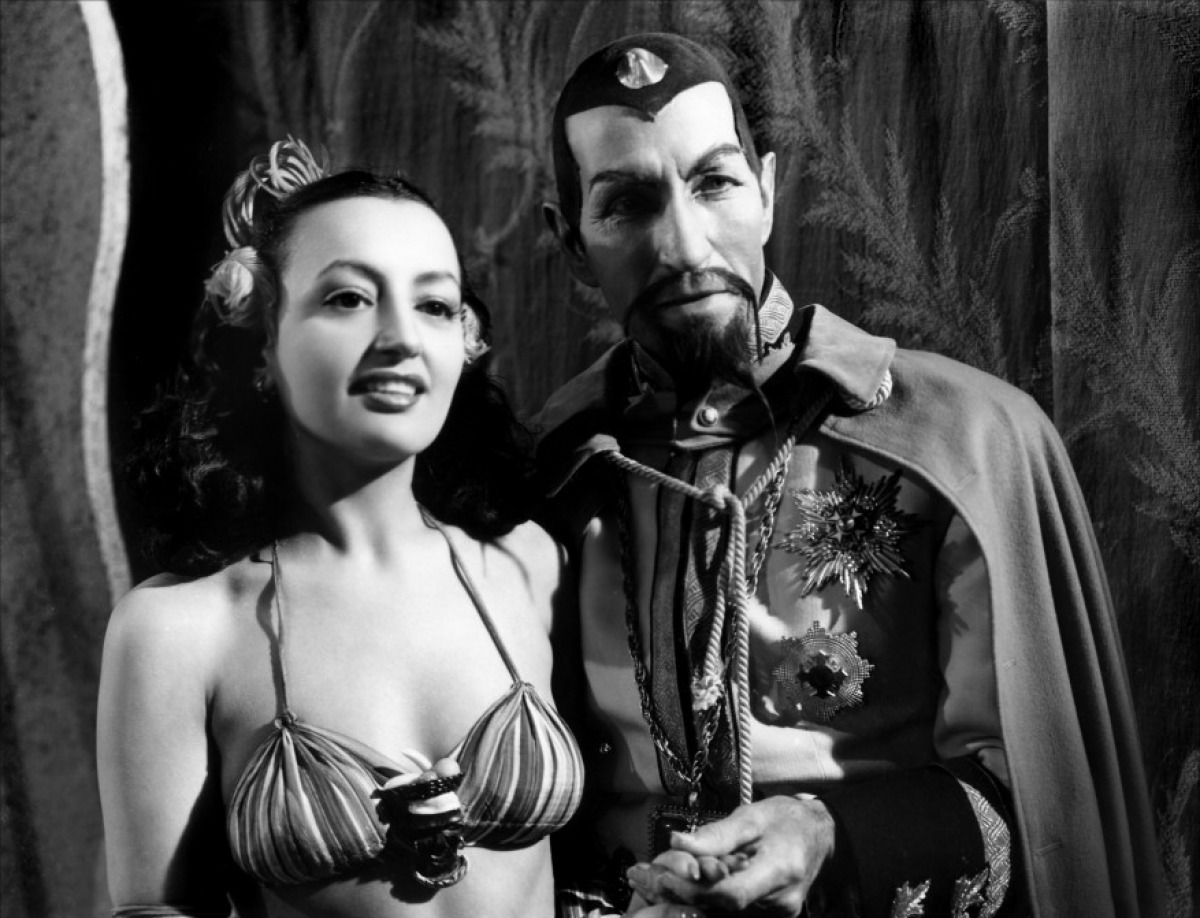
- Publicity still with Carmen D'Antonio and Charles Middleton for the 1940 serial
- Directed by: Ford Beebe; Ray Taylor
- Screenplay by: Basil Dickey; George H. Plympton; Barry Shipman
- Based on: Flash Gordon by Alex Raymond
- Produced by: Henry MacRae
- Starring: Larry (Buster) Crabbe; Carol Hughes; Charles Middleton; Frank Shannon
- Cinematography: Jerome Ash; William A. Sickner
- Production company: Hearst Entertainment Productions
- Distributed by: Universal Pictures
- Release date: 1966
- Running time: 88 minutes
- Country: United States
- Language: English

Purple Death from Outer Space is a 1966 American black-and-white science fiction film directed by Ford Beebe and Ray Taylor. It is the first of two feature-length compilations of the 1940 serial Flash Gordon Conquers the Universe. The second, Perils from the Planet Mongo, was released the same year.

== Plot ==
When the Earth is attacked by a mysterious substance causing death and leaving the victim purple, Dr Zarkov, Flash Gordon, and Dale Arden discover the deaths are caused by one of Ming's spaceships from the planet Mongo. The trio go to the planet to bring an antidote back to the Earth and thwart Ming's schemes. Ming's plan is to steal all the Earth's nitrogen.

Along the way, Flash and his cohorts meet Azura Queen of Magic who plans to turn all humans into Clay People, White Sapphire, the Tree People, the White Sapphire and Prince Barin.

== Reception ==
Creature Feature found the film to be a rousing video, giving it three out of five stars. The Encyclopedia of Science Fiction prefers the full, unedited version.

== Cast ==
- Buster Crabbe as Flash Gordon
- Carol Hughes as Dale Arden
- Charles Middleton as Ming the Merciless
- Frank Shannon as Dr. Zarkov
- Don Rowan as Capt. Torch (archive footage)
- Victor Zimmerman as Lt. Thong (archive footage)
- Lee Powell as Capt. Roka (archive footage)
- Donald Curtis as Capt. Ronal (archive footage)
- Edgar Edwards as Capt. Turan (archive footage)
- Roland Drew as Prince Barin
- Shirley Deane as Princess Aura
- Luli Deste as Queen Fria
- Sigurd Nilssen as Count Korro (archive footage)
- John Hamilton as Prof. Gordon (archive footage)
- Herbert Rawlinson as Prof. Frohman (archive footage)
- Tom Chatterton as Dr. Arden (archive footage)

== Soundtrack ==
Les préludes by Franz Liszt

== See also ==
- List of American films of 1966
