= Dick Elliott =

American actor (1886–1961)

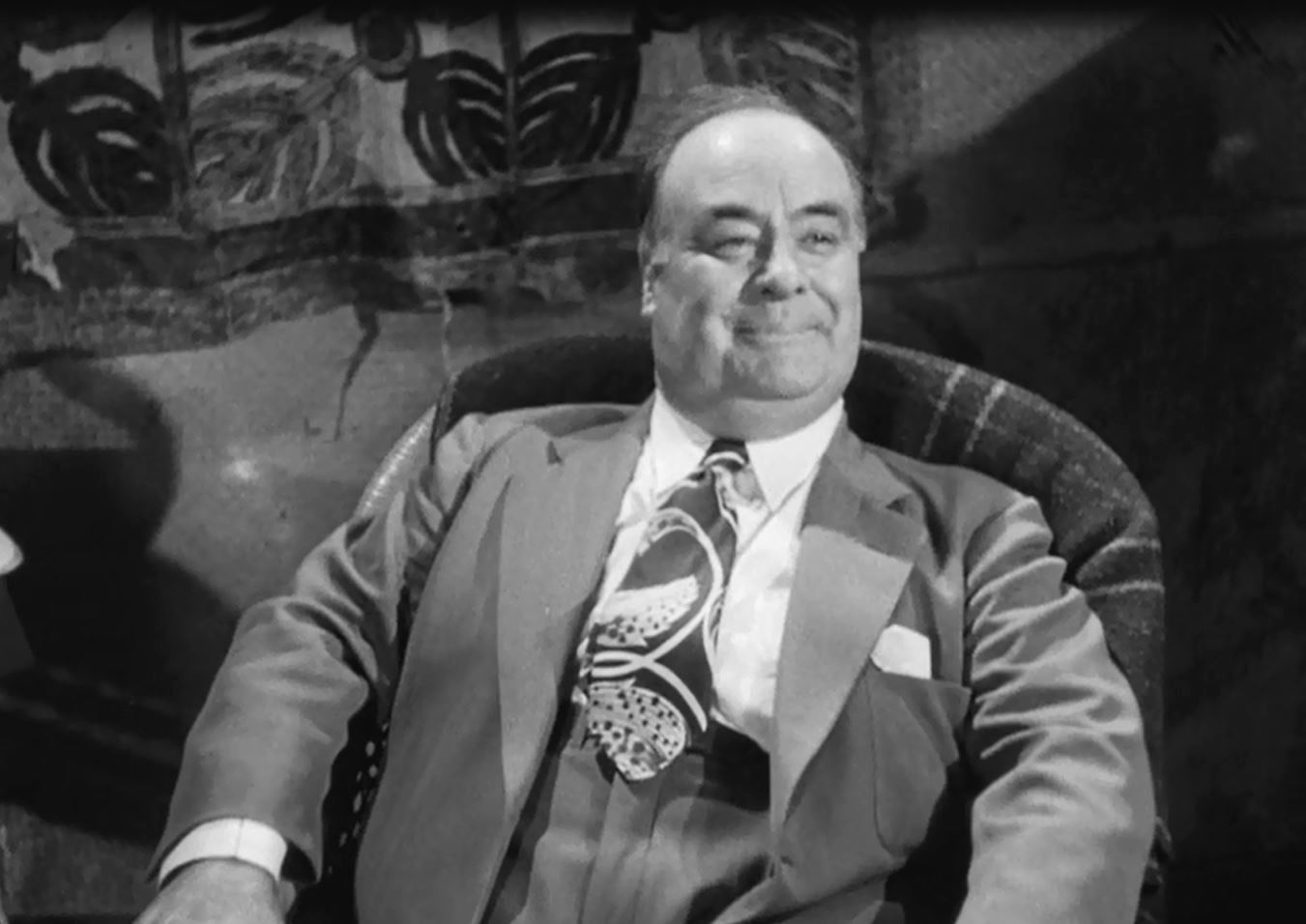
- Elliott in Dangerous Money (1946)
- Born: Richard Damon Elliott; April 30, 1886; Boston, Massachusetts, U.S.
- Died: December 22, 1961 (aged 75); Los Angeles, California, U.S.
- Resting place: Forest Lawn Memorial Park, Glendale, California, U.S.
- Occupation: Actor
- Years active: 1933–1961
- Spouse: Esther Claud (m. 1907; died 1949)
- Children: 1

Richard Damon Elliott (April 30, 1886 – December 22, 1961) was an American character actor who played in over 240 films from the 1930s until the time of his death.

== Early years ==
Elliott was born in Boston, Massachusetts.

== Career ==
Elliott played many different roles, typically as a somewhat blustery sort, such as a politician. A short, fat man, Elliott played Santa Claus on the Jimmy Durante, Red Skelton, and Jack Benny programs. Elliott had a couple of memorable lines in It's a Wonderful Life (1946), notably when he scolded James Stewart's character, who was trying to say goodnight to Donna Reed, advising him: "Why don't you kiss her instead of talking her to death?"

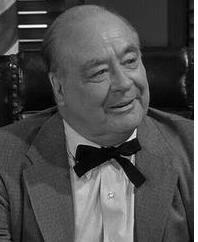
Elliott as Mayor Pike on The Andy Griffith Show, 1961

He also had a few memorable appearances in episodes of the Adventures of Superman television series. He appeared three times as Stanley on the CBS sitcom December Bride, as well as on two of ABC/Warner Brothers' western series, Sugarfoot and Maverick. He was cast as the prospector Peter Cooper and then as Sheriff Tiny Morris in two segments of CBS's Tales of the Texas Rangers. He appeared twice as Doc Thornton on ABC's The Real McCoys. Elliott is perhaps best known as Mayberry's Mayor Pike in early episodes of CBS's The Andy Griffith Show, one of his last screen works. In two of the eleven episodes featuring Elliot as mayor, actress Josie Lloyd portrayed his daughter.

== Death ==
On December 22, 1961, the 75-year-old Elliott died from complications of severe cardiovascular disease.

== Selected filmography ==
- Central Airport (1933) - Man Looking for Driver (uncredited)
- Picture Snatcher (1933) - Editor (uncredited)
- The Silk Express (1933) - Garson (uncredited)
- The Last Trail (1933) - Train Passenger (uncredited)
- The Worst Woman in Paris? (1933) - Mayor Rodney (uncredited)
- Please (1933, Short) - Johnny's Father
- Woman Unafraid (1934) - Tom Brady
- The Merry Frinks (1934) - 1st Reporter (uncredited)
- We're Rich Again (1934) - Mr. Green, the Yachtsman
- Helldorado (1935) - Mayor (uncredited)
- Times Square Lady (1935) - Stage Doorman (uncredited)
- It Happened in New York (1935) - Publicity Man
- Princess O'Hara (1935) - Agent (uncredited)
- Reckless (1935) - Man Near Drums (uncredited)
- Mister Dynamite (1935) - Buck (uncredited)
- Men of the Hour (1935) - Theatre Manager
- Break of Hearts (1935) - Max (uncredited)
- Ladies Crave Excitement (1935) - Stark's Aide (uncredited)
- Welcome Home (1935) - Emanuel Bond (uncredited)
- The Public Menace (1935) - Apartment House Manager (uncredited)
- Dr. Socrates (1935) - Photographer (uncredited)
- Annie Oakley (1935) - Major Ned Buntline (uncredited)
- One Way Ticket (1935) - Matty (uncredited)
- Your Uncle Dudley (1935) - Theater Manager (uncredited)
- Her Master's Voice (1936) - Police Captain
- The Prisoner of Shark Island (1936) - Actor at Ford's Theatre (uncredited)
- Silly Billies (1936) - Mayor Culpepper (uncredited)
- Brilliant Marriage (1936) - Newspaper Editor
- Special Investigator (1936) - Gabby Citizen (uncredited)
- Neighborhood House (1936) - Perkins - Charley's Boss
- The Princess Comes Across (1936) - the ship's doctor (uncredited)
- Educating Father (1936) - Townley (uncredited)
- High Tension (1936) - Sundholm (uncredited)
- The Big Game (1936) - Lowell (uncredited)
- Go West, Young Man (1936) - Union News Service Reporter (uncredited)
- Wanted! Jane Turner (1936) - Arizona Sheepman (uncredited)
- You Only Live Once (1937) - City Editor (uncredited)
- Outcast (1937) - Ticket Agent (uncredited)
- China Passage (1937) - Philip Burton
- The Outcasts of Poker Flat (1937) - Stumpy Carter
- Behind the Headlines (1937) - 2nd Bartender (uncredited)
- Parnell (1937) - Middle Aged Man (uncredited)
- Roaring Timber (1937) - Auditor (uncredited)
- Walter Wanger's Vogues of 1938 (1937) - Johnny Withers - Ticket Broker (uncredited)
- Counsel for Crime (1937) - Bundy (uncredited)
- Quick Money (1937) - Jeffrey Walker
- Every Day's a Holiday (1937) - Bar Patron (uncredited)
- The Jury's Secret (1938) - Donald Graves (uncredited)
- International Settlement (1938) - Ocean Liner Passenger (uncredited)
- Penitentiary (1938) - McNaulty (uncredited)
- Start Cheering (1938) - Station Agent (uncredited)
- Mr. Moto's Gamble (1938) - Kansas City Gambler (uncredited)
- Under Western Stars (1938) - William P. Scully
- Riders of the Black Hills (1938) - Good Neighbor Spokesman (uncredited)
- Prison Farm (1938) - The Glenby Judge (uncredited)
- Little Miss Broadway (1938) - Man with Bass Fiddle (uncredited)
- The Crowd Roars (1938) - Mr. Burns (uncredited)
- The Man from Music Mountain (1938) - Mr. Harkness (uncredited)
- Tenth Avenue Kid (1938) - Gun Salesman (uncredited)
- Meet the Girls (1938) - Party Guest (uncredited)
- Campus Confessions (1938) - Member Board of Regents (uncredited)
- Down on the Farm (1938) - Slicker (uncredited)
- A Man to Remember (1938) - Hank (uncredited)
- Next Time I Marry (1938) - Henry (uncredited)
- Disbarred (1939) - Small-Town Juror (uncredited)
- Boy Trouble (1939) - Dr. Benschlager
- The Lone Wolf Spy Hunt (1939) - Patrol-Car Cop at Italian Restaurant (uncredited)
- I'm from Missouri (1939) - Mule Judge
- Let Us Live (1939) - Rotarian Juror (uncredited)
- The Story of Vernon and Irene Castle (1939) - Train Conductor (uncredited)
- Sudden Money (1939) - Gambler (uncredited)
- The Story of Alexander Graham Bell (1939) - Man Laughing at Demo (uncredited)
- Undercover Agent (1939) - Garrison
- Frontier Marshal (1939) - Drunk (uncredited)
- I Stole a Million (1939) - Small-Town Doctor (uncredited)
- Nancy Drew and the Hidden Staircase (1939) - McKeever
- Mr. Smith Goes to Washington (1939) - Carl Cook
- Pack Up Your Troubles (1939) - Booking Agent (uncredited)
- Another Thin Man (1939) - Detective (uncredited)
- The Amazing Mr. Williams (1939) - Druggist (uncredited)
- All Women Have Secrets (1939) - The Justice of the Peace
- Abe Lincoln in Illinois (1940) - Politician (uncredited)
- Women Without Names (1940) - Roomer (uncredited)
- Two Girls on Broadway (1940) - Ice Rink Security Man (uncredited)
- Flight Angels (1940) - Mr. Rutledge
- Florian (1940) - Auctioneer (uncredited)
- The Mortal Storm (1940) - Passport Official on Train (uncredited)
- One Man's Law (1940) - Prendergast
- Scatterbrain (1940) - (uncredited)
- I Love You Again (1940) - Range Leader (uncredited)
- Ride, Tenderfoot, Ride (1940) - Airport Agent (uncredited)
- Up in the Air (1940) - Hastings
- I'm Still Alive (1940) - Dan Foley (uncredited)
- Young Bill Hickok (1940) - Elliott (uncredited)
- Li'l Abner (1940) - Marryin' Sam
- Melody Ranch (1940) - Sheriff Barstow (uncredited)
- A Night at Earl Carroll's (1940) - Old Man (uncredited)
- Behind the News (1940) - Foster
- Four Mothers (1941) - Ed (uncredited)
- Back Street (1941) - Hotel Desk Clerk (uncredited)
- A Man Betrayed (1941) - Ward Heeler (uncredited)
- Footlight Fever (1941) - Eric Queegle (uncredited)
- Mr. District Attorney (1941) - Detective in Café (uncredited)
- The Wagons Roll at Night (1941) - Mr. Paddleford (uncredited)
- She Knew All the Answers (1941) - Broker
- Sunset in Wyoming (1941) - Lieutenant Governor Cornelius Peabody
- Manpower (1941) - Drunk Texan (uncredited)
- The Pittsburgh Kid (1941) - Garvey
- Two Latins from Manhattan (1941) - Sylvester Kittelman (uncredited)
- One Foot in Heaven (1941) - Casper Cullenbaugh (scenes deleted)
- Top Sergeant Mulligan (1941) - Mr. Lewis
- Three Girls About Town (1941) - Magician Boarding Bus (uncredited)
- Tuxedo Junction (1941) - 1st Rose Parade Judge (uncredited)
- The Body Disappears (1941) - (scenes deleted)
- Road to Happiness (1941) - the kindly pawnbroker (uncredited)
- All Through the Night (1942) - Losing Bidder's Husband (uncredited)
- Man from Headquarters (1942) - Editor Elwin A. Jonas
- Yokel Boy (1942) - Doctor (uncredited)
- The Affairs of Jimmy Valentine (1942) - Tim Miller
- My Favorite Blonde (1942) - Dan (uncredited)
- So's Your Aunt Emma (1942) - Evans
- We Were Dancing (1942) - Mr. Samson Platt (uncredited)
- Sweetheart of the Fleet (1942) - Chumley
- Meet the Stewarts (1942) - Mr. Willoughby (uncredited)
- I Married an Angel (1942) - Oscar Scallion (uncredited)
- Wildcat (1942) - Harris (uncredited)
- You Can't Escape Forever (1942) - Meeker (uncredited)
- Criminal Investigator (1942) - Ed Brandt (uncredited)
- Scattergood Survives a Murder (1942) - Mathew Quentin
- Springtime in the Rockies (1942) - Mr. Jeepers (uncredited)
- Wrecking Crew (1942) - Traveling Salesman (uncredited)
- Laugh Your Blues Away (1942) - Mr. Conklin
- The Powers Girl (1943) - Beauty Pageant Announcer (uncredited)
- Silver Skates (1943) - Promoter (uncredited)
- After Midnight with Boston Blackie (1943) - Justice of Peace Potts (uncredited)
- Henry Aldrich Gets Glamour (1943) - McCluskey (uncredited)
- Three Hearts for Julia (1943) - Smith (uncredited)
- False Faces (1943) - Desk Sergeant (uncredited)
- Nobody's Darling (1943) - Gas Station Attendant (uncredited)
- So's Your Uncle (1943) - Police Sergeant
- Wintertime (1943) - Husband (uncredited)
- Here Comes Kelly (1943) - Minor Role (uncredited)
- Thank Your Lucky Stars (1943) - Customer in Bette Davis Number (uncredited)
- My Kingdom for a Cook (1943) - Man in Pullman Car (uncredited)
- Swing Out the Blues (1943) - Malcolm P. Carstairs
- Whispering Footsteps (1943) - Chief Joe Charters (uncredited)
- The Girl in the Case (1944) - Smith (uncredited)
- Gambler's Choice (1944) - Barber (uncredited)
- Henry Aldrich Plays Cupid (1944) - Matthews (uncredited)
- The Adventures of Mark Twain (1944) - Spectator at Frog-Jumping Contest (uncredited)
- Show Business (1944) - Man with Binoculars (uncredited)
- Meet the People (1944) - Salesman on Train (uncredited)
- Silent Partner (1944) - Pop
- When Strangers Marry (1944) - Sam Prescott
- The Impatient Years (1944) - Bailiff (uncredited)
- Goin' to Town (1944) - Squire Skimp
- An American Romance (1944) - Fat Man (uncredited)
- The Town Went Wild (1944) - Mayor of Midvale (uncredited)
- Hi, Beautiful (1944) - Passenger
- Main Street After Dark (1945) - Mac McLean (uncredited)
- Adventures of Kitty O'Day (1945) - Bascom, Hotel Guest
- The Man Who Walked Alone (1945) - The Mayor
- The Clock (1945) - Man offering directions in Station (uncredited)
- Dillinger (1945) - Man in Bar (uncredited)
- Diamond Horseshoe (1945) - Footlight Club Waiter (uncredited)
- Where Do We Go from Here? (1945) - Father (uncredited)
- Wanderer of the Wasteland (1945) - Record Clerk and Jailer (uncredited)
- Gangs of the Waterfront (1945) - Police Chief Davis
- Christmas in Connecticut (1945) - Judge Crowthers
- Star in the Night (1945, Short) - Traveler (uncredited)
- Girls of the Big House (1945) - Felton
- Saratoga Trunk (1945) - Politician (uncredited)
- Adventure (1945) - George (uncredited)
- Abilene Town (1946) - Jailbreak Messenger (uncredited)
- My Reputation (1946) - Tipsy Man (uncredited)
- Deadline at Dawn (1946) - Chap (uncredited)
- Breakfast in Hollywood (1946) - Man in Bus Depot (uncredited)
- The Kid from Brooklyn (1946) - Man in Window (uncredited)
- Talk About a Lady (1946) - Baldwin (uncredited)
- Partners in Time (1946) - Squire Skimp
- Blondie's Lucky Day (1946) - Mr. Hankins (uncredited)
- Rainbow Over Texas (1946) - Yacht Captain Monroe
- That Texas Jamboree (1946) - Mayor Smith (uncredited)
- She Wrote the Book (1946) - Fat Man (uncredited)
- Hot Cargo (1946) - Frankie
- Cowboy Blues (1946) - Feather-Buyer (uncredited)
- The Dark Horse (1946) - Ben Martin (uncredited)
- Till the End of Time (1946) - Bartender (uncredited)
- High School Hero (1946) - Mayor Whitehead
- Decoy (1946) - Driver (uncredited)
- Dangerous Money (1946) - P.T. Burke
- Lady Luck (1946) - Fat Man (scenes deleted)
- Ginger (1946) - Mayor Hector Tillford
- It's a Wonderful Life (1946) - Man on Porch (uncredited)
- The Devil Thumbs a Ride (1947) - Mack (uncredited)
- A Likely Story (1947) - Conductor (uncredited)
- For the Love of Rusty (1947) - Bill Worden (uncredited)
- That's My Gal (1947) - Stagedoor Man (uncredited)
- Copacabana (1947) - Mr. Green (uncredited)
- Desperate (1947) - Sheriff Hat Lewis (uncredited)
- Thunder Mountain (1947) - Dick (uncredited)
- The Son of Rusty (1947) - Mayor (uncredited)
- Singapore (1947) - Passenger (uncredited)
- Driftwood (1947) - Editor (uncredited)
- Magic Town (1947) - New Arrival (uncredited)
- The Fabulous Texan (1947) - Zebrina (uncredited)
- Heading for Heaven (1947) - Roger Wingate
- Doctor Jim (1947) - Edgar (uncredited)
- The Main Street Kid (1948) - Sam Trotter
- Slippy McGee (1948) - Fred Appelby
- Albuquerque (1948) - Harvey (uncredited)
- Money Madness (1948) - Malt Shop Customer (uncredited)
- The Sainted Sisters (1948) - Milt Freeman (uncredited)
- Silver River (1948) - Man Waiting Hours at McComb's (uncredited)
- The Dude Goes West (1948) - Whiskey Drummer (uncredited)
- So This Is New York (1948) - Audience Heckler (uncredited)
- The Vicious Circle (1948) - Businessman (uncredited)
- The Arkansas Swing (1948) - Realtor
- Good Sam (1948) - Politician (scenes deleted)
- Singin' Spurs (1948) - Mr. Miggs
- The Untamed Breed (1948) - Judge (uncredited)
- Rusty Leads the Way (1948) - Board Member (uncredited)
- The Return of October (1948) - Steward (uncredited)
- Homicide for Three (1948) - Doorman
- The Paleface (1948) - Mayor (uncredited)
- Rose of the Yukon (1949) - Doc Read
- Act of Violence (1949) - Convention Party Drunk (uncredited)
- I Cheated the Law (1949) - Bartender (uncredited)
- Joe Palooka in the Big Fight (1949) - Sid (uncredited)
- Flamingo Road (1949) - Tom Coyne (uncredited)
- The Gay Amigo (1949) - Man on Stage (uncredited)
- Night Unto Night (1949) - Auto Court Manager
- Trail of the Yukon (1949) - Editor Sullivan
- Feudin' Rhythm (1949) - Charles Chester Upperworth (uncredited)
- Gun Crazy (1950) - Man Fleeing Robbed Market (uncredited)
- Blue Grass of Kentucky (1950) - Grainger (uncredited)
- Blonde Dynamite (1950) - Mr. Stanton (uncredited)
- The Silver Bandit (1950) - Van Fleet Stooglehammer
- Belle of Old Mexico (1950) - Ship's Captain (uncredited)
- Western Pacific Agent (1950) - Sheriff
- Rock Island Trail (1950) - Martin, Railroad Conductor
- Lucky Losers (1950) - Clarence (uncredited)
- A Modern Marriage (1950) - Jim Burke
- September Affair (1950) - Fat Gentleman (uncredited)
- Union Station (1950) - Powerhouse Workman (uncredited)
- Bunco Squad (1950) - Thurman (uncredited)
- Across the Badlands (1950) - Rufus Downey
- Surrender (1950) - Sen. Clowe (uncredited)
- Joe Palooka in the Squared Circle (1950) - Sheriff
- Hunt the Man Down (1950) - Happy (uncredited)
- Belle Le Grand (1951) - Joe (uncredited)
- Flame of Stamboul (1951) - Mr. Shirley (uncredited)
- Two Dollar Bettor (1951) - Hefty Racetrack Drunk Bettor (uncredited)
- Disc Jockey (1951) - Customer (uncredited)
- Fort Defiance (1951) - Kincaid
- Honeychile (1951) - Sheriff
- Rancho Notorious (1952) - Storyteller (uncredited)
- Gobs and Gals (1952) - Shaving Man (uncredited)
- High Noon (1952) - Kibbee (uncredited)
- The Atomic City (1952) - Prize-Drawing MC (uncredited)
- Three for Bedroom "C" (1952) - Train Passenger (uncredited)
- Park Row (1952) - Jeff Hudson
- The WAC from Walla Walla (1952) - Sheriff (uncredited)
- Montana Belle (1952) - Jeptha Rideout - Banker
- Androcles and the Lion (1952) - Ox Cart Driver (uncredited)
- "I Love Lucy" (1954, Episode "Lucy is Envious") Man on Roof
- Witness to Murder (1954) - Apartment Manager
- Double Jeopardy (1955) - Happy Harry
- The Twinkle in God's Eye (1955) - Lumberman (uncredited)
- Last of the Desperados (1955) - Walter 'Wally' Stone
- "I Love Lucy" (1956, Episode "Lucy and Bob Hope") Hot Dog Customer
- Meet Me in Las Vegas (1956) - Sands Co-Owner (uncredited)
- When Gangland Strikes (1956) - Ames Jury Foreman (uncredited)
- Don't Knock the Rock (1956) - Sheriff at End
- Duel at Apache Wells (1957) - Jewelry Salesman (uncredited)
- Hold That Hypnotist (1957) - Hotel Desk Clerk
- Omar Khayyam (1957) - Tavern Owner (uncredited)
- The Joker Is Wild (1957) - Man Shaving (uncredited)
- Looking for Danger (1957) - Mike Clancy
- Bombers B-52 (1957) - Mr. Sampton (uncredited)
- Up in Smoke (1957) - Mike
- Man from God's Country (1958) - Mayor (uncredited)
- In the Money (1958) - Mike Clancy (uncredited)
- Desire Under the Elms (1958) - Old Farmer (uncredited)
- Life Begins at 17 (1958) - Lynton Baldwin (uncredited)
- Man of the West (1958) - Willie (uncredited)
- The Restless Gun (1958) - Episode "The Gold Star"
- Tales of Wells Fargo (1959, Episode "Lola Montez") - Mr. Collins
- Go, Johnny, Go! (1959) - Man in Phone Booth (uncredited)
- The Andy Griffith Show (1960–1961) - Mayor Pike (11 episodes)
- Bachelor Father (1961, Episode 125: "House At Smuggler's Cove") - Herbert Trindle
- Rawhide (1961) – Ben in S3:E16, "Incident on the Road Back
