= Looking for Danger =

1957 film

- Directed by: Austen Jewell
- Written by: Elwood Ullman (screenplay); Edward Bernds and Elwood Ullman (story)
- Produced by: Ben Schwalb
- Starring: Huntz Hall; Stanley Clements; David Gorcey; Jimmy Murphy; Eddie LeRoy; Dick Elliott; Lili Kardell
- Cinematography: Harry Neumann
- Edited by: William Austin
- Music by: Marlin Skiles
- Production company: Allied Artists Pictures
- Distributed by: Allied Artists Pictures
- Release date: October 6, 1957
- Running time: 62 minutes
- Country: United States
- Language: English

Looking for Danger is a 1957 American comedy film directed by Austen Jewell and starring the comedy team of The Bowery Boys. The film was released on October 6, 1957 by Allied Artists and is the forty-sixth film in the series.

== Plot ==
A military investigator traces a missing government-issued item to Clancy's Cafe. Duke, attempting to explain the circumstances, recounts the wartime exploits of the Bowery Boys. The boys' sergeant, fed up with Sach and Duke, volunteers them for a suicide mission. They go under cover as German soldiers to deliver a message to a sultan. The sultan, however, is in league with the German high command and plots to sabotage the advancing American troops.

== Cast ==
=== The Bowery Boys ===
- Huntz Hall as Horace Debussy "Sach" Jones
- Stanley Clements as Stanislaus "Duke" Coveleskie
- David Gorcey as Charles "Chuck" Anderson
- Jimmy Murphy as Myron
- Eddie LeRoy as Blinky

=== Supporting cast ===
- Dick Elliott as Mike Clancy
- Lili Kardell as Shareen
- Richard Avonde as Col. Ahmed Tabari
- Otto Reichow as Wolff
- Michael Granger as Sidi-Omar
- Peter Mamakos as Hassan
- Joan Bradshaw as Zarida
- George Khoury as Mustapha
- Henry Rowland as Wetzel
- Harry Strang as Watson
- Paul Bryar as Harper
- Jane Burgess as Sari
- John Harmon as Lester Bradfield
- Michael Vallon as Waiter

== Cast notes ==
- Dick Elliott now takes over for the role of Mike Clancy.
- Jimmy Murphy ('Myron')'s last Bowery Boys film.

== Production ==
Looking for Danger was filmed in June 1957. The screenplay was written by veteran comedy writer Elwood Ullman, from an original story he wrote with his usual collaborator, writer-director Edward Bernds. Bernds and Ullman had sketched out the story a couple of years earlier while Bernds was directing the series; the leading roles were intended for Leo Gorcey and Huntz Hall, and the gags were similar to those in the Bernds-Ullman Three Stooges comedies. In a 1986 interview with Ted Okuda, Bernds noted, "If something is funny in one situation you can generally modify it to fit someone else. In our pictures, Huntz was the comic and Leo more the straight man, and it was very much a Stooge-like relationship."

== Reception ==
With 46 feature films to their credit, released on an average of every three months since 1946, the Bowery Boys were such a perennially popular attraction that trade publications no longer bothered to review their movies. Each new picture could be counted on to do as much business as the others in the series. Only The Exhibitor was still offering capsule reviews, and graded Looking for Danger as an "average Bowery Boys entry."

Producer Ben Schwalb moved on to other projects, and actor Jimmy Murphy was released. The studio decided to discontinue the theatrical series in favor of releasing the entire backlog to television. Huntz Hall still had two more feature films on his contract; former film editor and now staff producer Richard Heermance was assigned to oversee these last two quickies (Up in Smoke and In the Money). William Beaudine—who had been the Bowery Boys' most frequent director—came back to film them in a matter of days. The studio then demolished the long-standing "Bowery street" on the studio backlot.

== Home media ==
Warner Archives released Looking for Danger on made-to-order DVD in the United States as part of "The Bowery Boys, Volume Three" on October 1, 2013.

Preceded by Spook Chasers; 1957	'The Bowery Boys' movies 1946–1958	Succeeded by Up in Smoke; 1957
