= Vicki Lester =

American actress (1915–2001)

- Lester in 1938
- Born: Dorothy Gertrude Day; April 7, 1915; New York City, U.S.
- Died: May 7, 2001 (aged 86); Beverly Hills, California, U.S.
- Occupation: Actress
- Years active: 1937–1942
- Spouses: Steven Stanford (m. 1945; div. 1946) Jack Bernhard (m. 1947; died 1997)

Vicki Lester (born Dorothy Gertrude Day; April 7, 1915 – May 7, 2001) was an American actress. She is best known for appearing in Sky Giant (1938), The Mad Miss Manton (1938) and The Lone Rider and the Bandit (1942).

== Biography ==
Born Dorothy Day, Lester took her stage name from Janet Gaynor's character in A Star Is Born (1937). The name change was suggested by Mervyn LeRoy and approved by David Selznick. Alas, she never made the grade as a 'star' in her own right.

Lester attended schools in Manhattan and originally planned to design clothes for a career. She was a student of music and art, and she gained notability as a pianist. She became a model for artists and photographers, leading to her being named one of the "Twelve Most Photographed Girls in America". She was "seen in hundreds of advertisements and on scores of magazine covers".

Lester died in May 2001 in Beverly Hills, California at the age of 86.

== Filmography ==
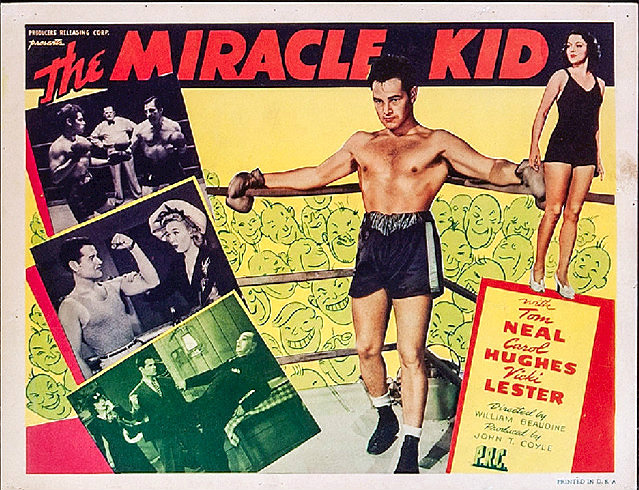
Tom Neal, Carol Hughes and Vicky Lester in lobby card for The Miracle Kid (1941)

=== Film ===
Year	Title	Role	Notes
1937	Walter Wanger's Vogues of 1938	Model	(uncredited)
1938	The Patient in Room 18	Nurse Taylor	
1938	Maid's Night Out	Adele - Bill's Cousin	
1938	Fools for Scandal	Party Guest	(uncredited)
1938	This Marriage Business	Nancy Parker	
1938	Go Chase Yourself	Bit Role	(unconfirmed, uncredited)
1938	Having Wonderful Time	Camp Guest	(uncredited)
1938	Sky Giant	Edna, the Colonel's Secretary	
1938	The Mad Miss Manton	Kit Beverly	
1940	The Great Plane Robbery	Helen Carver	
1941	You're Out of Luck	Sonya Varney	
1941	Tall, Dark and Handsome	Snuggy, Sales Girl	
1941	Tom, Dick and Harry	Paula	
1941	The Miracle Kid	Helen Gibbs	
1942	The Lone Rider and the Bandit	Laura Hicks	
1942	Sleepytime Gal	Blonde	(uncredited)
1942	You're Telling Me	Mrs. Adalaide Parks	
1942	I Live on Danger	Keefe's Secretary	

== Bibliography ==
- Stella Star, Vicki Lester, May 31, 2016
