= The Man from Music Mountain =

The Man from Music Mountain may refer to:

- Man from Music Mountain (1938 film), American western film starring Gene Autry
- The Man from Music Mountain (1943 film), American western film starring Roy Rogers and Trigger
