= Under Western Stars =

1938 film by Joseph Kane

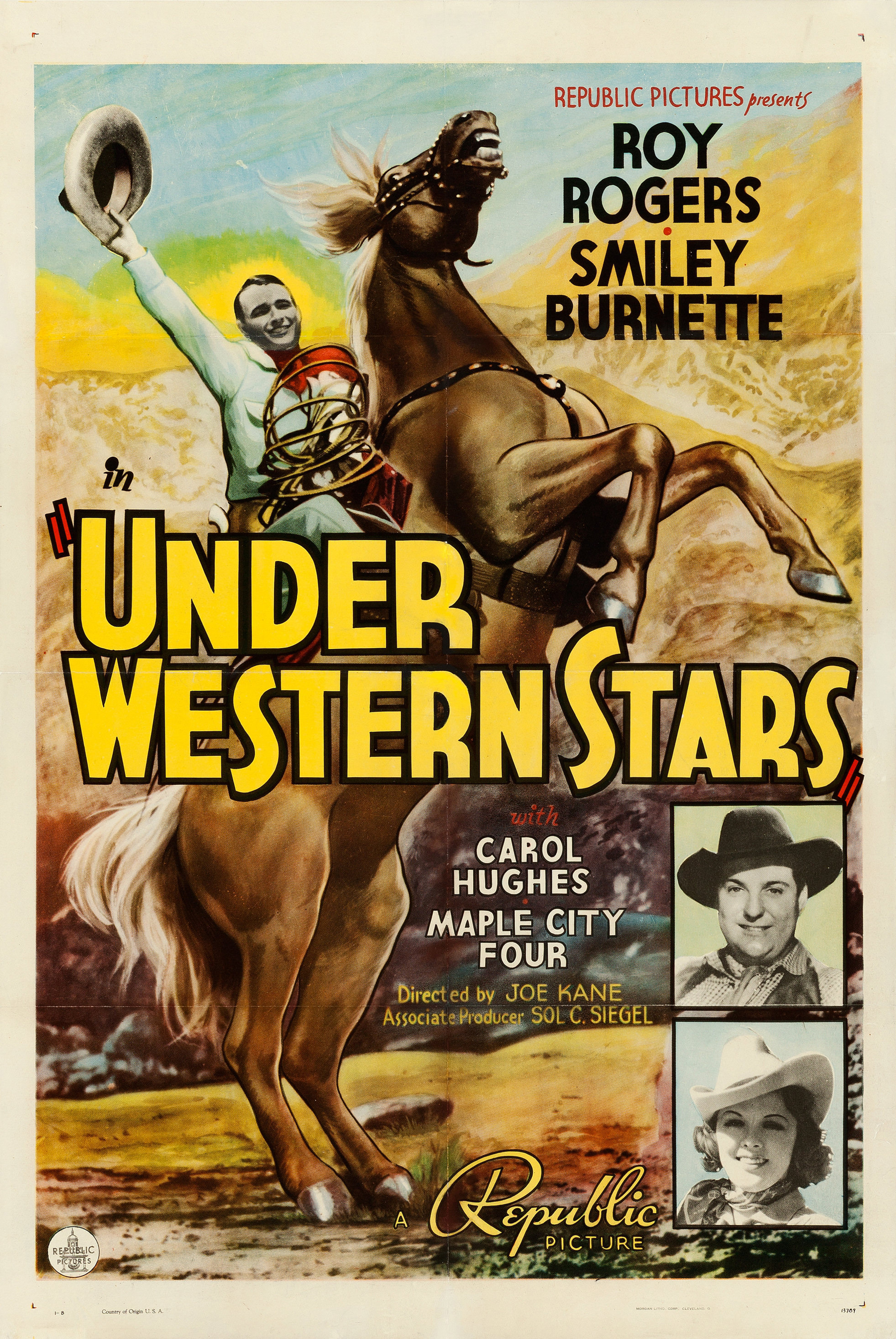
- Theatrical release poster
- Directed by: Joseph Kane
- Screenplay by: Dorrell McGowan; Stuart E. McGowan; Betty Burbridge
- Story by: Dorrell McGowan; Stuart E. McGowan
- Produced by: Sol C. Siegel
- Starring: Roy Rogers; Smiley Burnette; Carol Hughes; Maple City Four
- Cinematography: Jack Marta
- Edited by: Lester Orlebeck
- Music by: Alberto Colombo (uncredited)
- Production company: Republic Pictures
- Distributed by: Republic Pictures
- Release date: April 20, 1938 (US)
- Running time: 65 minutes
- Country: United States
- Language: English

Under Western Stars

Under Western Stars is a 1938 American Western film directed by Joseph Kane and starring Roy Rogers, Smiley Burnette, Carol Hughes, and the Maple City Four. Written by Dorrell McGowan, Stuart E. McGowan, and Betty Burbridge, the film is about a populist singing cowboy who decides to run for Congress in order to seek federal assistance to help small ranchers regain their water rights during the Dust Bowl of the 1930s. His campaign comes into conflict with greedy water company executives.

The film was the first starring role for Rogers, made under contract to Republic Pictures during a walkout by the studio's singing cowboy Gene Autry. The picture was filmed on location in the Alabama Hills of Lone Pine, California.

== Plot ==
John Fairbanks' water company is hoarding water behind a dam and refuses to allow free water for the farmers and ranchers. When Roy Rogers and his men overpower the dam's guards and release the valve on the water, the sympathetic mayor fines Rogers one dollar and convinces him to follow in his father's footsteps and run for Congress. Rogers campaigns on the water issue and builds on his popular support, winning the election over incumbent William P. Scully who is propped up by John Fairbanks. Rogers is encouraged and secretly helped by John Fairbanks' feisty daughter, Eleanor.

Though defeated, Fairbanks uses his connections to prevent other members of Congress from meeting with Congressman Rogers, in particular Congressman Edward H. Marlowe, who is critical to the Federal water bill. Receiving an anonymous letter from Eleanor, Rogers tracks down Marlow to a gathering on his estate and invites him and the other company present to a party. At the party, he performs a song highlighting the plight of his constituents ("Dust"). The other Congressmen are still unsure of the extent of the problem but resolve to travel to assess the situation.

After arriving in Rogers' district, the Congressional delegation announce that they found the water issue less pressing than reported, especially after receiving a tip that the footage presented during Rogers' song was shot in another state. They prepare to leave but Marlowe's wife requests a drive in the countryside. During the drive, the delegation is ambushed by outlaws who take their cars, leaving them on horses. They begin the slow trip back to town and run into the camp of Rogers, Eleanor, and their friends. Rogers offers his assistance, but the group are battered by dust storms and parched from the unavailability of water. Eventually, during a particularly serious dust storm, they take shelter in a poor farming house where it's accidentally revealed by the woman living there that the whole sequence of events from the outlaws was orchestrated by Rogers to give the delegation a first-hand look at the water issue. Rogers insists that though the situation was manufactured, the conditions are real, causing a bemused Congressman Marlowe to agree to support the Federal water bill.

Suddenly, Rogers gets word that a group of desperate ranchers are headed to blow up the Fairbanks dam. Rogers rides out and successfully prevents the explosives from being delivered and diffuses the conflict. Rogers, Eleanor and their friends ride off singing, assured that they have won their fight for water.

== Cast ==
- Roy Rogers as Roy Rogers
- Smiley Burnette as Frog
- Carol Hughes as Eleanor Fairbanks
- Maple City Four as Singers
- Guy Usher as John Fairbanks
- Tom Chatterton as Congressman Edward H. Marlowe
- Kenneth Harlan as Richards
- Alden Chase as Tom Andrews
- Brandon Beach as Senator Wilson
- Earl Dwire as Mayor Biggs
- Jean Fowler as Mrs. Wilson
- Dora Clement as Mrs. Marlow
- Dick Elliott as William P. Scully
- Burr Caruth as Larkin
- Slim Whitaker as Tremaine
- Jack Rockwell as Sheriff
- Frankie Marvin as Deputy Pete

== Production ==
The film's pre-production title was Western Cowboy. The film was originally intended to star Gene Autry, but Autry was on strike beginning in December 1937 so Republic Pictures cast Roy Rogers. The film was filmed on location in the Alabama Hills of Lone Pine, California.

Music was provided Rogers and the Maple City Four. The song "Dust" was purchased by Republic Pictures from its composers Gene Autry and Johnny Marvin. However, Autry later filed a lawsuit for improper use of the song and dramatization of the lyrics, which was settled out of court.

== Legacy ==
The film's song "Dust", written by Johnny Marvin, was nominated for an Academy Award for Best Song. In 2009, Under Western Stars was selected for preservation in the National Film Registry by the Library of Congress for being "culturally, historically or aesthetically" significant.
