= Up in Smoke (1957 film) =

1957 film by William Beaudine

- Directed by: William Beaudine
- Screenplay by: Jack Townley
- Story by: Bert Lawrence; Elwood Ullman
- Produced by: Richard Heermance
- Starring: Huntz Hall; Stanley Clements; David Gorcey; Eddie LeRoy; Byron Foulger
- Cinematography: Harry Neumann
- Edited by: William Austin
- Music by: Marlin Skiles
- Production company: Allied Artists Pictures
- Distributed by: Allied Artists Pictures
- Release date: December 22, 1957
- Running time: 64 minutes
- Country: United States
- Language: English

Up in Smoke is a 1957 American comedy film directed by William Beaudine and starring the comedy team of The Bowery Boys. The film was released on December 22, 1957, by Allied Artists and is the penultimate film in the series.

== Plot ==
The Bowery Boys have been collecting money to help a young polio survivor in the neighborhood. A local crook delivers Sach to a phony bookie joint, where Sach loses the $90 the gang collected. At Mike Clancy's café, Sach declares that he would give his very soul to get even with the bookies, and immediately receives a visit from Beelzebub, the Devil himself, sporting a morning coat and two small horns under his hat. Beelzebub offers Sach a deal: he will give Sach the name of a winning horse every day for a week in return for Sach's soul. Sach signs Beelzebub's contract and is provided with his winner of the day. During the week, "Mr. Bub" keeps materializing unexpectedly with more tips. On the last day of their agreement, Beelzebub gives Sach a $100 bill and tells him to go to the racetrack and await word from him.

At the track Beelzebub, disguised as a soft-drink vendor, gives Sach the winning horse's name, "Rubber Check." Sach's pal Chuck arrives with the news that the Polio Fund has agreed to pay for their friend's treatment. Sach then realizes that they no longer need the money and he can cancel Beelzebub's contract. Beelzebub refuses and points out that if the horse wins, Sach's soul is his. Sach takes the place of Rubber Check's jockey in the race, but the horse wins anyway. Beelzebub reappears to claim Sach, but is thwarted: Rubber Check is disqualified because he had an unauthorized jockey, thereby nullifying Beelzebub's contract with Sach and causing the bookies to lose all their money.

Back on the Bowery, Sach is surprised to find the disenfranchised Devil working as a busboy at Mike's. Beelzebub can regain his "horns" by securing new clients, so Sach directs him toward the bookies.

== Cast ==
=== The Bowery Boys ===
- Huntz Hall as Horace Debussy "Sach" Jones
- Stanley Clements as Stanislaus "Duke" Coveleskie
- David Gorcey as Charles "Chuck" Anderson
- Eddie LeRoy as Blinky

=== Supporting cast ===
- Byron Foulger as Beelzebub (Mr. Bub)
- Dick Elliott as Mike Clancy
- Judy Bamber as Mabel
- Ralph Sanford as Sam
- Ric Roman as Tony
- Joe Devlin as Al
- Fritz Feld as Dr. Bluzak
- Benny Rubin as Bernie
- James Flavin as Policeman
- Earle Hodgins as Friendly Frank
- John Mitchum as Desk Sergeant
- Jack Mulhall as Police Clerk
- Wilbur Mack as Druggist

== Production ==
Many of the Bowery Boys comedies were topical sendups of media sensations then in the public eye. The topic of past life regression—someone claiming a past life as another person—had been popularized in The Search for Bridey Murphy, and the Bowery Boys burlesqued it in Hold That Hypnotist. In the same vein, the Broadway musical comedy Damn Yankees had the Devil in a leading comic role, and the Bowery Boys followed suit with Up in Smoke. It was announced in December 1956 and originally scheduled to begin production in June 1957, but was pushed back to August. The working title (a play on a very popular TV series) was I Love Lucifer.

Producer Ben Schwalb had moved on to other projects at Allied Artists, but Huntz Hall still had two more films left on his contract. Staff producer Richard Heermance was assigned to make these last two Bowery Boys features, Up in Smoke and In the Money. The team's longtime director William Beaudine returned to film them quickly.

The writers deliberately cast against type for the key role of the Devil. Instead of casting a screen menace like Boris Karloff or Peter Lorre, or a lower-priced villain like Philip Van Zandt, they selected Byron Foulger, long established as the meekest and mildest character in the movies. Foulger played the role with enthusiasm, and the studio gave him special billing in the advertising and theatrical posters.

Up in Smoke is the only film in which Sach refers to Duke as "Chief," a nickname formerly reserved for Leo Gorcey as Slip. Typically, Sach would refer to Duke as "Dukey."

== Reception ==
This was the penultimate Bowery Boys feature and American trade publications no longer reviewed the new entries. In Britain the film was released in December 1959, more than two years after it was made. Josh Billings of Kinematograph Weekly wrote, "Dizzy, fast-moving Bowery Boys comedy. The variation on the Faust theme is no masterpiece of wit, but nevertheless makes a lively vehicle for the popular team."

== Home media ==
Warner Archives released the film on made-to-order DVD in the United States as part of "The Bowery Boys, Volume Three" on October 1, 2013.

Preceded by Looking for Danger; 1957	'The Bowery Boys' movies 1946-1958	Succeeded by In the Money; 1958
