= Jungle Raiders (serial) =

1945 film by Lesley Selander

- Directed by: Lesley Selander
- Written by: Ande Lamb; George H. Plympton
- Produced by: Sam Katzman
- Starring: Kane Richmond; Eddie Quillan; Veda Ann Borg; Carol Hughes
- Cinematography: Ira H. Morgan
- Edited by: Earl Turner
- Music by: Lee Zahler
- Color process: Black and white
- Distributed by: Columbia Pictures
- Release date: 14 September 1945
- Running time: 284 minutes (15 chapters)
- Country: United States
- Language: English

Jungle Raiders is a 1945 Columbia film serial. Kane Richmond plays the hero Bob Moore, with Janet Shaw as Ann Reed (his love interest), and Charles King plays head villain Jake Raynes.

== Plot ==
Ann Reed travels to a mysterious land following her father, Dr. Murray Reed, who disappeared into its interior many years ago. Ann falls in with Bob Moore and Joe Riley, who have just been mustered out of the military and plan to join Moore's father, who is researching rumors of a miracle healing drug used by the witch doctors of a mysterious tribe. The owner of the local trading post is determined to keep the scientists out of the area so he can locate a cache of jewels guarded by the tribe without outside interference...

== Cast ==
- Kane Richmond as Bob Moore
- Eddie Quillan as Joe Riley, Bob Moore's comedy sidekick
- Veda Ann Borg as Cora Bell
- Carol Hughes as Zara, the High Priestess
- Janet Shaw as Ann Reed
- John Elliott as Dr Horace Moore
- Jack Ingram as Tom Hammil
- Charles King as Jake Raynes, owner of the trading post
- Ernie Adams as Charley, a henchman
- I. Stanford Jolley as Brent, a henchman
- Kermit Maynard as Cragg, a henchman
- Budd Buster as Dr Murray Reed, abductee and Ann Reed's father
- Nick Thompson as the chief of the Arzecs
- Alfredo DeSa as Matu

== Production ==
=== Stunts ===
- George Magrill
- Kermit Maynard
- Eddie Parker
- Wally West

== Chapter titles ==
1. Mystery of the Lost Tribe
2. Primitive Sacrifice
3. Prisoners of Fate
4. Valley of Destruction
5. Perilous Mission
6. Into the Valley of Fire
7. Devil's Brew
8. The Dagger Pit
9. Jungle Jeopardy
10. Prisoners of Peril
11. Vengeance of Zara
12. The Key to Arzec
13. Witch Doctor's Treachery
14. The Judgment of Rana
15. The Jewels of Arzec

_{Source:}

== See also ==
- List of film serials by year
- List of film serials by studio

| Preceded by The Monster and the Ape (1945) | Columbia Serial; Jungle Raiders (1945) | Succeeded by Who's Guilty? (1945) |
