= Flash Gordon Conquers the Universe =

1940 US film serial directed by Ford Beebe and Ray Taylor

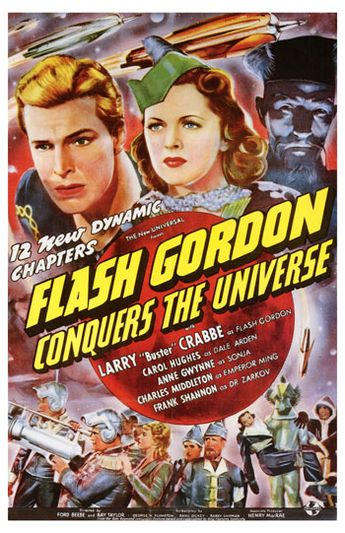
- Theatrical release poster
- Directed by: Ford Beebe; Ray Taylor
- Written by: George H. Plympton; Basil Dickey; Barry Shipman; Alex Raymond (comic strip)
- Produced by: Henry MacRae
- Starring: Buster Crabbe; Carol Hughes; Charles B. Middleton; Frank Shannon; Roland Drew
- Cinematography: Jerome Ash; William A. Sickner
- Production companies: Universal Pictures; King Features Syndicate
- Distributed by: Universal Pictures
- Release date: March 3, 1940
- Running time: 195 min (12 episodes)
- Country: United States
- Language: English

Flash Gordon Conquers the Universe, Chapter 1

Flash Gordon Conquers the Universe is a 1940 American black-and-white science-fiction 12-chapter movie serial from Universal Pictures, produced by Henry MacRae and co-directed by Ford Beebe and Ray Taylor. The serial stars Buster Crabbe, Carol Hughes, Charles B. Middleton, Frank Shannon, and Roland Drew. It was written by George H. Plympton, Basil Dickey, and Barry Shipman, and was adapted from Alex Raymond's syndicated newspaper comic strip of the same name from King Features Syndicate. Shown theatrically in 12 separate weekly "chapters", it was the last of the three Universal Flash Gordon serials made between 1936 and 1940.

During the 1950s, all three Flash Gordon serials were syndicated to television by Motion Pictures for Television, along with many of Universal's other serial output. To avoid confusion with the imported Flash Gordon TV series airing around the same time, they were retitled Space Soldiers, Space Soldiers' Trip to Mars, and Space Soldiers Conquer the Universe.

In 1966, Flash Gordon Conquers the Universe was edited down by King Features Syndicate into two feature-length films for television syndication: Purple Death from Outer Space and Perils from the Planet Mongo. In the early 1970s, a third feature version was re-edited for the 16 mm home movie market, using story material taken from the entire serial. It bore the title Space Soldiers Conquer the Universe and later appeared on television during the 1980s. Afterward, all three edited feature-length versions became available through various grey market public-domain video labels, first on VHS videotape and later on DVD.

In the mid-1970s, all three complete Universal Flash Gordon serials were shown chapter-by-chapter by PBS stations across the U.S., bringing them to a new generation of science-fiction fans, two years before Star Wars and Close Encounters of the Third Kind. From the late 1980s onward, all three serials became available on the home video market under their original theatrical release titles, chapters, and running times.

== Plot ==
A deadly plague is ravaging the Earth, known as the Purple Death because of a purple spot left on victims' foreheads. Flash Gordon learns that Ming the Merciless is behind the plague when he spots one of Ming's spaceships spreading the "Death Dust" in the Earth's atmosphere.

Flash Gordon, along with Dr. Alexis Zarkov and Dale Arden, return to the planet Mongo to find a possible cure, first seeking the assistance of their old friend Prince Barin. The trio continues to battle Ming and his allies, led by henchman Captain Torch, who has been charged with stopping the Earthlings by any means.

The three eventually find an antidote, called Polarite, in Mongo's remote northern Kingdom of Frigia. They must now get the cure back to Earth in sufficient quantities to stop the ravaging plague. Ming sends in an army of robot bombs, and he succeeds in capturing Zarkov and Dale. After their capture, Flash must return to Earth to distribute the antidote by rocketship, the same way the original Death Dust was first spread.

Upon his return to Mongo, Flash is able to free Zarkov and Dale. They continue their struggles against Ming, Captain Torch, and his men through a series of close encounters, deadly escapes, and rescues, all the while continuing to thwart Ming and his allies.

Ming and his minions are eventually locked away by one of his men in the high control tower of his castle. Unknown to them, Flash is piloting a rocketship that is speeding directly toward that tower. He parachutes away just in the nick of time, and in a daring aerial maneuver, Flash is successful in boarding Barrin's nearby rocketship, which has Dale and Zarkov aboard. Flash's unmanned spaceship is actually a flying bomb, having been loaded with highly volatile Solarite. Its rapid forward momentum carries it directly into the castle's control tower, where the large explosion that follows ends Ming's tyrannical reign forever. Prince Barin soon takes his rightful place as the peaceful ruler of Mongo.

Ming's last words to Flash were, "I am the universe!" Zarkov observes that with Ming's death, "Flash Gordon has conquered the universe".

== Cast ==
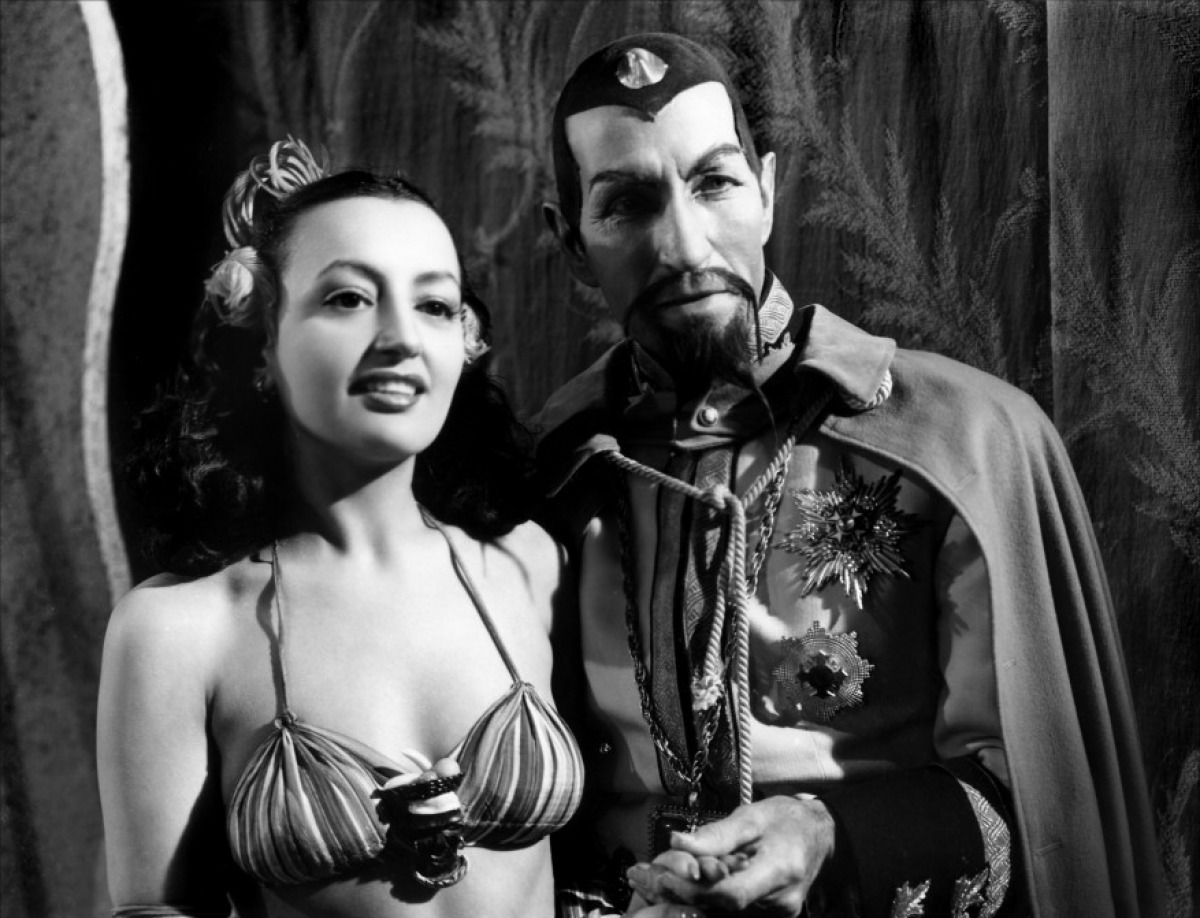
Publicity still with Carmen D'Antonio and Charles Middleton

- Buster Crabbe as Flash Gordon
- Carol Hughes as Dale Arden
- Frank Shannon as Dr. Alexis Zarkov
- Charles B. Middleton as Ming the Merciless
- Roland Drew as Prince Barin
- Shirley Deane as Princess Aura
- Donald Curtis as Captain Ronal (uncredited)
- Lee Powell as Radio Officer Roka
- Don Rowan as Captain Torch
- Victor Zimmerman as Lieutenant Thong
- Anne Gwynne as Lady Sonja
- John Hamilton as Professor Gordon
- Edgar Edwards as Captain Turan
- William Royle as Captain Sudan
- Sigurd Nilssen as Count Korro
- Luli Deste as Queen Fria (uncredited)
- Michael Mark as Professor Karm
- Byron Foulger as Professor Druk
- As-yet unidentified player as Radio Officer Tekla
- Ray Mala as Prince of the Rock People (uncredited)

== Chapter titles ==
1. "The Purple Death"
2. "Freezing Torture"
3. "Walking Bombs"
4. "The Destroying Ray"
5. "The Palace of Terror"
6. "Flaming Death"
7. "The Land of the Dead"
8. "The Fiery Abyss"
9. "The Pool of Peril"
10. "The Death Mist"
11. "Stark Treachery"
12. "Doom of the Dictator"

_{Source:}

== Production ==
Plot points were taken from the preceding serial, Flash Gordon's Trip to Mars.

The "chamber of the death dust experiments" was previously used in Universal's Buck Rogers serial. One money-saving device also used was inserting in the serial some exciting mountain climbing search and rescue scenes from the German film White Hell of Pitz Palu (1930), as well as using its music score.

Ming is portrayed as a semi-uniformed military dictator in this serial, rather than as a Fu Manchu or Devil-like character as in the two previous Flash Gordon serials.

Co-star billing was given to Anne Gwynne, a Universal ingenue, whose role does not develop until the middle of the serial. This last-minute change in billing status resulted in the complete elimination of actor Donald Curtis, as Ronal, from both versions of the screen credits, despite the fact that he, unlike Gwynne, is in every episode playing Flash's primary aide, a major character role.

The musical score for was built around the symphonic poem Les Preludes by the nineteenth century composer and pianist Franz Liszt (1811-1886). Also, much use was made of Heinz Roemheld's music for Universal's sound version of the German silent film White Hell of Pitz Palu (1929).

Jean Rogers, who had played Dale Arden in the two previous Flash Gordon serials, was under contract to 20th Century Fox at that point, and neither she nor Fox wanted her to repeat the Dale Arden role; it was given instead to a recent Universal contract starlet Carol Hughes.

== Critical reception ==
According to Jim Harmon and Don Glut, Flash Gordon Conquers the Universe "was the most picturesque of the trilogy but surrendered much compelling charm for its cinematic sophistication".

== Soundtrack ==
- Les préludes by Franz Liszt
- Excerpts from The Bride of Frankenstein soundtrack by Franz Waxman.

== Award nomination ==
The entire Flash Gordon Conquers the Universe serial was nominated in 2016 for the 1940 Retro Hugo Award, in the category "Best Dramatic Presentation - Long Form", sponsored by The World Science Fiction Society. The Retro Hugo Awards that year were presented at MidAmeriCon II, the 74th World Science Fiction Convention held in Kansas City, MO.
