= Top Sergeant Mulligan (1941 film) =

1941 film by Jean Yarbrough

- Theatrical release poster
- Directed by: Jean Yarbrough
- Screenplay by: Edmond Kelso
- Produced by: Lindsley Parsons
- Starring: Nat Pendleton; Carol Hughes; Sterling Holloway; Marjorie Reynolds; Tom Neal; Frank Faylen; Charlie Hall
- Cinematography: Mack Stengler
- Edited by: Jack Ogilvie
- Production company: Monogram Pictures
- Distributed by: Monogram Pictures
- Release date: October 17, 1941
- Running time: 70 minutes
- Country: United States
- Language: English

Top Sergeant Mulligan is a 1941 American comedy film directed by Jean Yarbrough and written by Edmond Kelso. The film stars Nat Pendleton, Carol Hughes, Sterling Holloway, Marjorie Reynolds, Tom Neal, Frank Faylen and Charlie Hall. The film was released on October 17, 1941, by Monogram Pictures.

== Plot ==
Pat and Budd are sick of being harassed and running away from bill collector Herman Mulligan, so they decide to enlist in the army. All seems good until they arrive at the bootcamp and discover that their platoon's "Top Sergeant" is First Sergeant Herman Mulligan. Mulligan takes advantage of this situation and makes their life hard.

== Cast ==
- Nat Pendleton as "Top Sergeant" Herman Mulligan
- Carol Hughes as Avis
- Sterling Holloway as Frank Snark
- Marjorie Reynolds as Gail Nash
- Tom Neal as Don Lewis
- Frank Faylen as Pat Dolan
- Charlie Hall as Budd Doolittle
- Betty Blythe as Mrs. Lewis
- Dick Elliott as Mr. Lewis
- Maynard Holmes as Briggs
- Wonderful Smith as Wonderful Smith
