= Spook Chasers =

1957 film by George Blair

- Directed by: George Blair
- Written by: Elwood Ullman
- Produced by: Ben Schwalb
- Starring: Huntz Hall; Stanley Clements; David Gorcey; Jimmy Murphy; Eddie LeRoy; Percy Helton
- Cinematography: Harry Neumann
- Edited by: Neil Brunnenkant
- Music by: Marlin Skiles
- Production company: Allied Artists Pictures
- Distributed by: Allied Artists Pictures
- Release date: June 2, 1957
- Running time: 62 minutes
- Country: United States
- Language: English

Spook Chasers is a 1957 horror comedy film starring The Bowery Boys. The film was released on June 2, 1957 by Allied Artists and is the forty-fifth film in the series.

== Plot ==
Café owner Mike Clancy, suffering from asthma, is told by his doctor that he needs a rest cure in the mountains. A crooked real estate agent accepts Mike's down payment on an old house that once belonged to a gangster's widow. Mike and the Bowery Boys head out to the dilapidated house, and while housecleaning they find some of the gangster's cash. The jubilant gang hunts for more money, and Mike resolves to buy the house outright.

The realtor and his secretary are amazed when Mike pays in full, in cash, which arouses their suspicions. They try to frighten the gang out of the house. Meanwhile, underworld pals of the deceased gangster find out where the loot is, and go after the gang. Soon the Bowery Boys are terrorized on all sides, as scary apparitions and menacing gunmen take over the house.

== Cast ==
=== The Bowery Boys ===
- Huntz Hall as Horace Debussy "Sach" Jones
- Stanley Clements as Stanislaus "Duke" Coveleskie
- David Gorcey as Chuck Anderson
- Jimmy Murphy as Myron
- Eddie LeRoy as Blinky

=== Supporting cast ===
- Percy Helton as Mike Clancy
- Darlene Fields as Dolly Owens
- William Henry as Harry Shelby
- Peter Mamakos as Snap Cicero
- Ben Welden as Ziggy
- Robert Shayne as Lt. Harris
- Robert Christopher as Ernie
- Pierre Watkin as Doc Moss

== Production ==
The film marks the first and only appearance of Percy Helton as café owner Mike Clancy. It also marks the first appearance of bespectacled Blinky, played by 25-year-old Eddie LeRoy, as a member of the gang. In addition, David Gorcey now reverts to using his real last name in the screen credits.

== Reception ==
Elwood Ullman, a veteran screenwriter for The Three Stooges, incorporated some Stooge gags into this Bowery Boys feature. The "scare comedy" premise was so familiar and successful -- and the Bowery Boys franchise was so predictable and profitable -- that both critics and audiences knew what to expect from Spook Chasers. The Exhibitor reported, "This is right in the Bowery Boys' groove and they do right handsome in slapstick fashion by the Elwood Ullman screenplay, which offers nothing new but does manage to squeeze some laughs out of a tried and true, surefire comedy pattern. Where the lads are still popular this should bring in their followers." Spook Chasers was reviewed by at least one trade paper in October 1957, in time for Halloween bookings, and it continued to play weekend matinées year-round in the United States and Canada until November 1968.

Recent critical response regards the film as a matter of taste. Leonard Maltin calls Spook Chasers "yet another Bowery Boys crooks-posing-as-ghosts entry, with a surfeit of wheezy gags." Unseen Films notes, "On its own terms it's actually a fun little film."

== Home media ==
Warner Archives released the film on made-to-order DVD in the United States as part of "The Bowery Boys, Volume Three" on October 1, 2013.

Preceded by Hold That Hypnotist; 1957	'The Bowery Boys' movies 1946-1958	Succeeded by Looking for Danger; 1957
