= Peter Mamakos =

American actor (1918–2008)

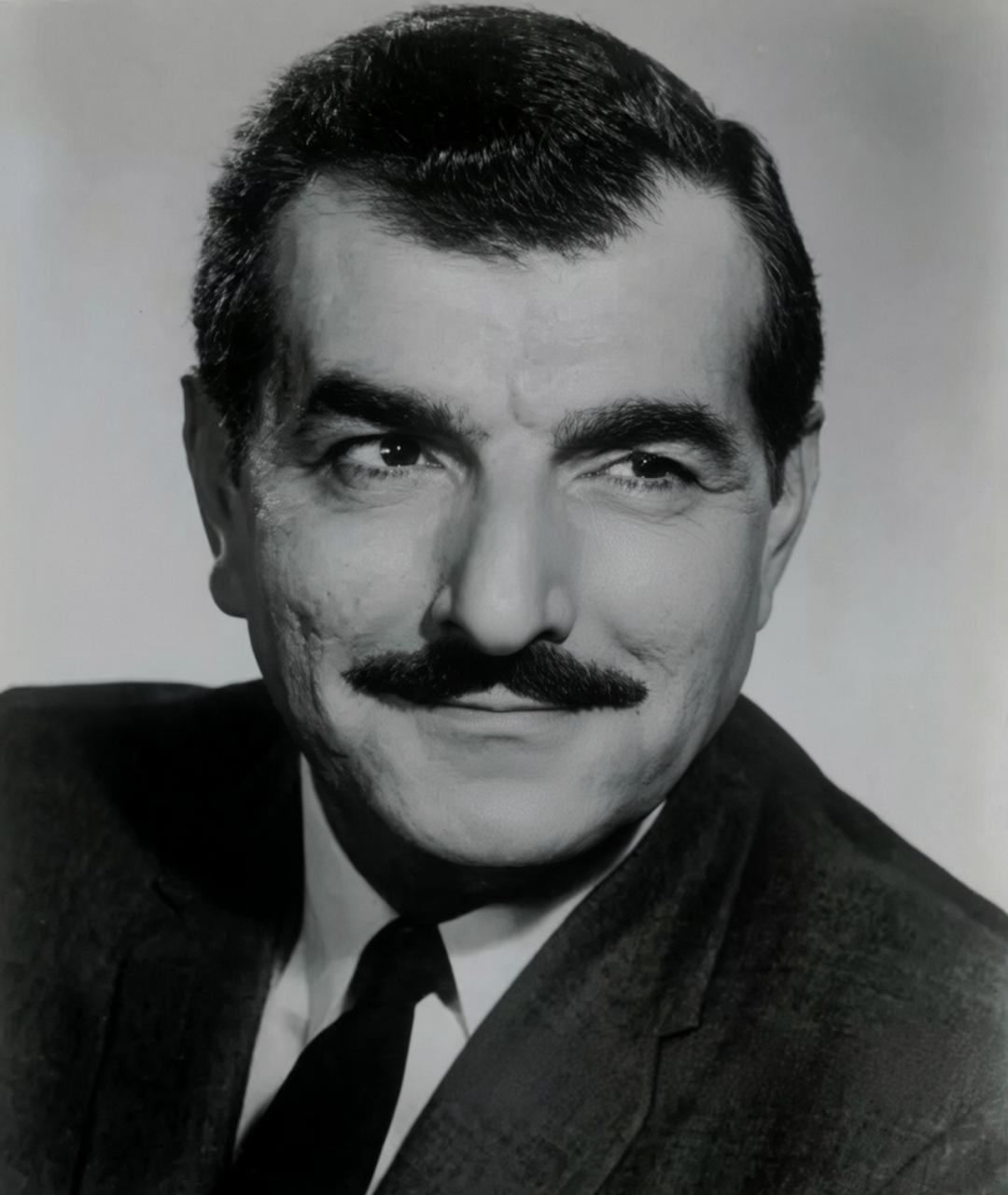
- Mamakos in 1970
- Born: Peter Mamakos; December 14, 1918; Somerville, Massachusetts, U.S.
- Died: April 27, 2008 (aged 89); Paso Robles, California, U.S.
- Occupation: Actor
- Years active: 1949–1990

Peter Mamakos (December 14, 1918 – April 27, 2008) was an American film and television actor.

== Early life ==
Mamakos was of Greek descent. Born in Somerville, Massachusetts, he attended Somerville High School, where he was a member of the National Honor Society, the Players Club (drama society), and the Boys Glee Club.

Mamakos' father owned Pilgrim restaurants in New England. Mamakos was sent to California to scout locations for restaurants, but he liked Hollywood so much that he decided to stay, declining his father's offers of $50,000 in cash and a $250,000 nightclub of his own if he returned to Boston. He told a reporter, "I feel right at home in Hollywood. A hot kitchen and a hot sound stage are alike – you're surrounded by hams in both."

== Career ==
Peter Mamakos was perhaps best known for playing Greek, Indian, Hispanic, French, Italian, and Middle Eastern villains from the 1940s through the 1990s.

=== Film ===
Mamakos was in eight movies in his first seven months in Hollywood. Mamakos appeared in Trail of the Yukon (1949), in which other supporting players and he offered what a Variety review called "stock performances".

=== Television ===
He had a recurring role as Jean Lafitte on the ABC Western The Adventures of Jim Bowie. He also appeared as a Lionian Henchman in Tarzan and the Slave Girl (1950) starring Lex Barker. Mamakos made three guest appearances on Perry Mason from 1962 to 1966, in the role of murderer Nick Paolo in the 1962 episode, "The Case of the Stand-in Sister", Juan Carlos Ramirez in the 1964 episode, "The Case of a Place Called Midnight", and murder victim Olaf Deering in the 1966 episode, "The Case of the Sausalito Sunrise". He also appeared in 1966 in episodes 41 and 42 of Batman. He appeared in several episodes of the TV show The Lone Ranger.

Mamakos is also remembered as Happy J. King, the Metropolis crime boss who engaged a European criminal scientist to invent "synthetic kryptonite". Kidnapping Lois Lane and Jimmy Olsen, King came closer than any other criminal in ridding the Earth of Superman (George Reeves). This event was recounted in "The Defeat of Superman", the sixth episode of the second season of The Adventures of Superman, which first aired on October 24, 1953. He co-starred on Daniel Boone in 1970 as a Cherokee chief in episode 18 "A Run for the Money".

== Personal life ==
Mamakos was married and had a daughter who was born in 1955 and a son born in 1957.

Peter Mamakos, Somerville High School, 1937

== Filmography ==
Film
Year	Title	Role	Notes
1949	Bride of Vengeance	Ferrara's Crossbowman	Uncredited
1949	Tuna Clipper	Capt. Manuel Pereira	
1949	House of Strangers	Bank Guard	Uncredited
1949	Trail of the Yukon	Henchman Rand	
1950	Malaya	Henchman	Uncredited
1950	Cargo to Capetown	Gomez	Uncredited
1950	Tarzan and the Slave Girl	Lionian Henchman	Uncredited
1950	South Sea Sinner	Man at Table	Uncredited
1950	Between Midnight and Dawn	'Cootie' Adams	
1950	Kim	Conspirator	Uncredited
1951	Flame of Stamboul	Pierre	Uncredited
1951	Pier 23	Nick Garrison	
1951	Sirocco	Merchant Businessman	Uncredited
1951	China Corsair	Juan (bartender)	Uncredited
1951	Silver Canyon	Laughing Jack	
1951	Mask of the Avenger	Sergeant	Uncredited
1951	The Mark of the Renegade	Pirate	Uncredited
1951	Comin' Round the Mountain	Gangster in Night Club	
1951	Let's Go Navy!	Chief Nuramo	Uncredited
1951	The People Against O'Hara	James Korvac	Uncredited
1952	Harem Girl	Sarab	
1952	Viva Zapata!	Soldier	Uncredited
1952	Tarzan's Savage Fury	Pilot	Uncredited
1952	Captain Pirate	Coulevain's First Mate	Uncredited
1952	Horizons West	Lt. Salazar	Uncredited
1952	The Prisoner of Zenda	De Gautet - Conspirator	Uncredited
1953	City Beneath the Sea	Captain Pedro Mendoza	
1953	The Bandits of Corsica	Diegas	
1953	Fort Vengeance	Broken Lance	Uncredited
1953	The Glory Brigade	Col. Kallicles	Uncredited
1953	Forbidden	Sam	
1953	El Alaméin	Cpl. Singh Das	
1953	Private Eyes	Chico	
1954	The Miami Story	Gangster	Uncredited
1954	Captain Kidd and the Slave Girl	Pirate	Uncredited
1954	The Gambler from Natchez	Etienne	Uncredited
1954	The Adventures of Hajji Baba	Chief Executioner	Uncredited
1955	Pirates of Tripoli	Keppa	Uncredited
1955	The Prodigal	Guard	Uncredited
1955	A Bullet for Joey	Ship Captain	Uncredited
1955	I Cover the Underworld	Charlie Green	
1955	The Marauders	Ramos	
1955	Ain't Misbehavin'	Andy, Greek Fisherman	
1955	The Twinkle in God's Eye	Cruishank	Uncredited
1955	Desert Sands	Pvt. Lucia Capella	
1956	The Conqueror	Bogurchi	
1956	When Gangland Strikes	Mr. Thorndyke	Uncredited
1956	Miracle in the Rain	Headwaiter	Uncredited
1956	The Searchers	Jerem Futterman	Uncredited
1956	Quincannon, Frontier Scout	Blackfoot Sam	
1956	The Best Things in Life Are Free	Henchman	Uncredited
1956	The Ten Commandments	Chief Driver	
1957	Spook Chasers	Snap Sizzolo	
1957	My Gun Is Quick	LaRoche – Smuggler Chief	
1957	Looking for Danger	Hassan	
1957	The Crooked Circle	Nick	
1957	Sabu and the Magic Ring	Mazufar	
1958	Fort Bowie	Sgt Kukas	
1958	Merry Andrew	Vittorio Gallini	
1958	The Man Who Died Twice	Deli Counterman	Uncredited
1959	The Rabbit Trap	Truck Driver	Uncredited
1962	Terror at Black Falls	Juan Avila	
1963	Drums of Africa	Chavera	
1963	Island of Love	Nick	
1964	Taggart	Cantina Owner	Uncredited
1965	Ship of Fools	Religious Man	Uncredited
1967	Catalina Caper	Borman	
1968	The Heart Is a Lonely Hunter	Spirmonedes	
1969	Justine	Kawwass	Uncredited
1969	A Dream of Kings	Falconis	
1970	Triangle		
1971	The Resurrection of Zachary Wheeler	Premier Mabulla	
1974	For Pete's Sake	Dominic	
1977	The Other Side of Midnight	Cocyannis	
1980	The Man with Bogart's Face	Spoony Singh	

== Television ==
Year	Title	Role	Notes
1958	Gunsmoke	Art Carp	S3:E38, "Overland Express"
1960	Rawhide	Eddie	S2:E14, "Incident of the Devil and his Due"
1961	Rawhide	Slade	S3:E25, "Incident of the Running Man"
1963	The Virginian	Walzchek	S1:E30 "The Final Hour"
1969	Mannix	Smith	S3:E9 "The Nowhere Victim"
