= The Miracle Kid =

1941 film by William Beaudine

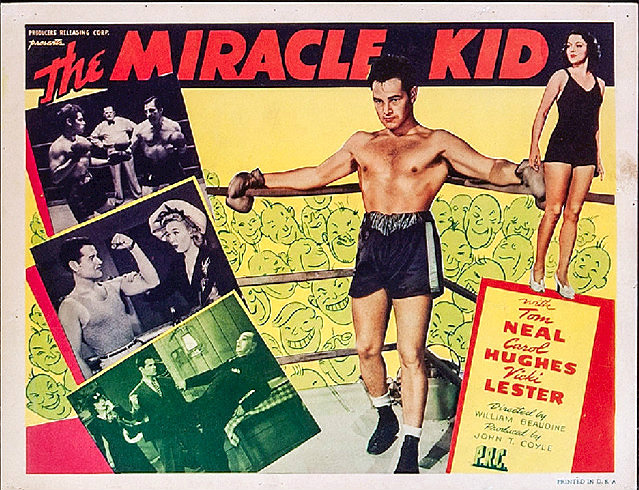
- Lobby card
- Directed by: William Beaudine
- Written by: Gerald Drayson Adams; John T. Coyle; Henry Sucher
- Produced by: John T. Coyle
- Starring: Tom Neal; Carol Hughes; Vicki Lester
- Cinematography: Arthur Martinelli
- Edited by: Guy V. Thayer Jr.
- Music by: Clarence Wheeler
- Production company: Producers Releasing Corporation
- Distributed by: Producers Releasing Corporation
- Release date: 14 November 1941
- Running time: 69 minutes
- Country: United States
- Language: English

The Miracle Kid is a 1941 American sports comedy film directed by William Beaudine and starring Tom Neal, Carol Hughes and Vicki Lester. It was made and distributed by the low-budget Producers Releasing Corporation.

== Synopsis ==
A young boxer named Jimmy Connley (portrayed by Tom Neal) finds his life turned upside down when he meets with sudden success in the ring.

== Cast ==
- Tom Neal as Jimmy Connley
- Carol Hughes as Pat Hilton
- Vicki Lester as Helen Gibbs
- Betty Blythe as Madame Gloria
- Ben Taggart as J. Hamilton Gibbs
- Alex Callam as Al Bolger
- Thornton Edwards as Pedro
- Joe Gray as Kayo Kane
- Paul Bryar as Rocco
- Pat Gleason as Reporter
- Billy McGowan as Trigger O'Brien
- John Ince as Commissioner
- Gene O'Donnell as Usher
- Warren Jackson as Headwaiter
- Larry McGrath as Referee
- Sam Lufkin as Referee
- Minta Durfee as Pheney
- Gertrude Messinger as Marge
- Adele Smith as Lorraine
- Frank Otto as Shady

== Bibliography ==
- Fetrow, Alan G. Feature Films, 1940-1949: a United States Filmography. McFarland, 1994.
- Marshall, Wendy L. William Beaudine: From Silents to Television. Scarecrow Press, 2005.
