= In the Money =

1958 film by William Beaudine

- Directed by: William Beaudine
- Written by: Elwood Ullman
- Screenplay by: Al Martin
- Produced by: Richard V. Heermance
- Starring: Huntz Hall
- Cinematography: Harry Neumann
- Edited by: Neil Brunnenkant
- Music by: Marlin Skiles
- Color process: Black and white
- Distributed by: Allied Artists
- Release date: February 16, 1958
- Running time: 61 minutes
- Country: United States
- Language: English

In the Money is a 1958 American comedy film directed by William Beaudine and starring The Bowery Boys. The film was released on February 16, 1958, by Allied Artists Pictures and is the 48th and final film in the series. It was directed by William Beaudine and written by Al Martin and Elwood Ullman.

== Plot ==
Sach is hired to escort Gloria, a poodle, on a trip to London, England. Unbeknownst to Sach, the people who hired him are international smugglers, who have hidden some diamonds under some false fur on Gloria. The rest of The Bowery Boys, suspicious of Sach's good fortune, think that "Gloria" must be a dangerous female. They decide to sneak onto Sach's London-bound ship, only to wind up swabbing the deck as punishment for being stowaways. Once in England, Sach and the boys soon catch on to the smugglers' scheme. Inspector Herbert Saunders, a senior detective of Scotland Yard, accuses Sach and his gang of being the smugglers.

== Cast ==
=== The Bowery Boys ===
- Huntz Hall as Horace Debussy "Sach" Jones
- Stanley Clements as Stanislaus "Duke" Coveleskie
- David Gorcey as Charles "Chuck" Anderson
- Eddie LeRoy as Blinky

=== Remaining cast ===
- Patricia Donahue as Babs DeWitt
- Paul Cavanagh as Inspector Herbert Saunders
- Leonard Penn as Don Clarke
- John Dodsworth as Blake Cummings
- Leslie Denison as Inspector White (uncredited)
- Dick Elliott as Mike Clancy (uncredited)
- Ralph Gamble as Randall (uncredited)
- Pamela Light as girl with French heels (uncredited)
- Owen McGiveney as Dr. Rufus B. Smedley (uncredited)
- Jack Mulhall as the police desk sergeant
- Patrick O'Moore as Reggie (uncredited)
- Ashley Cowan as Bellboy (uncredited)
- Snub Pollard as Scotland Yard Valet (uncredited)
- Norma Varden as Mrs. Smythe-Chumley, owner of dog Madeline (uncredited)

== Production ==
The Bowery Boys features had traditionally been released seasonally, with a new film reaching theaters every three months. The studio decided to cancel the theatrical series and release the entire backlog to television. Producer Ben Schwalb moved on to other projects, but Huntz Hall still had two films remaining on his contract. The studio assigned former film editor Richard Heermance to produce these final films, and the reliable William Beaudine to direct them quickly. It was a sudden, rushed ending for the unusually long-running series: both Up in Smoke and On the Make (released as In the Money) were filmed back-to-back in late August and early September 1957. Allied Artists then demolished its long-standing "Bowery street" on the studio backlot, replacing it with a western street.

== Home media ==
Warner Archives released the film on made-to-order DVD in the United States as part of "The Bowery Boys, Volume Four" on August 26, 2014.

Preceded by Up in Smoke; 1957	'The Bowery Boys' movies 1946-1958	Succeeded by None
