= Carol Hughes (actress) =

American actress (1910–1995)

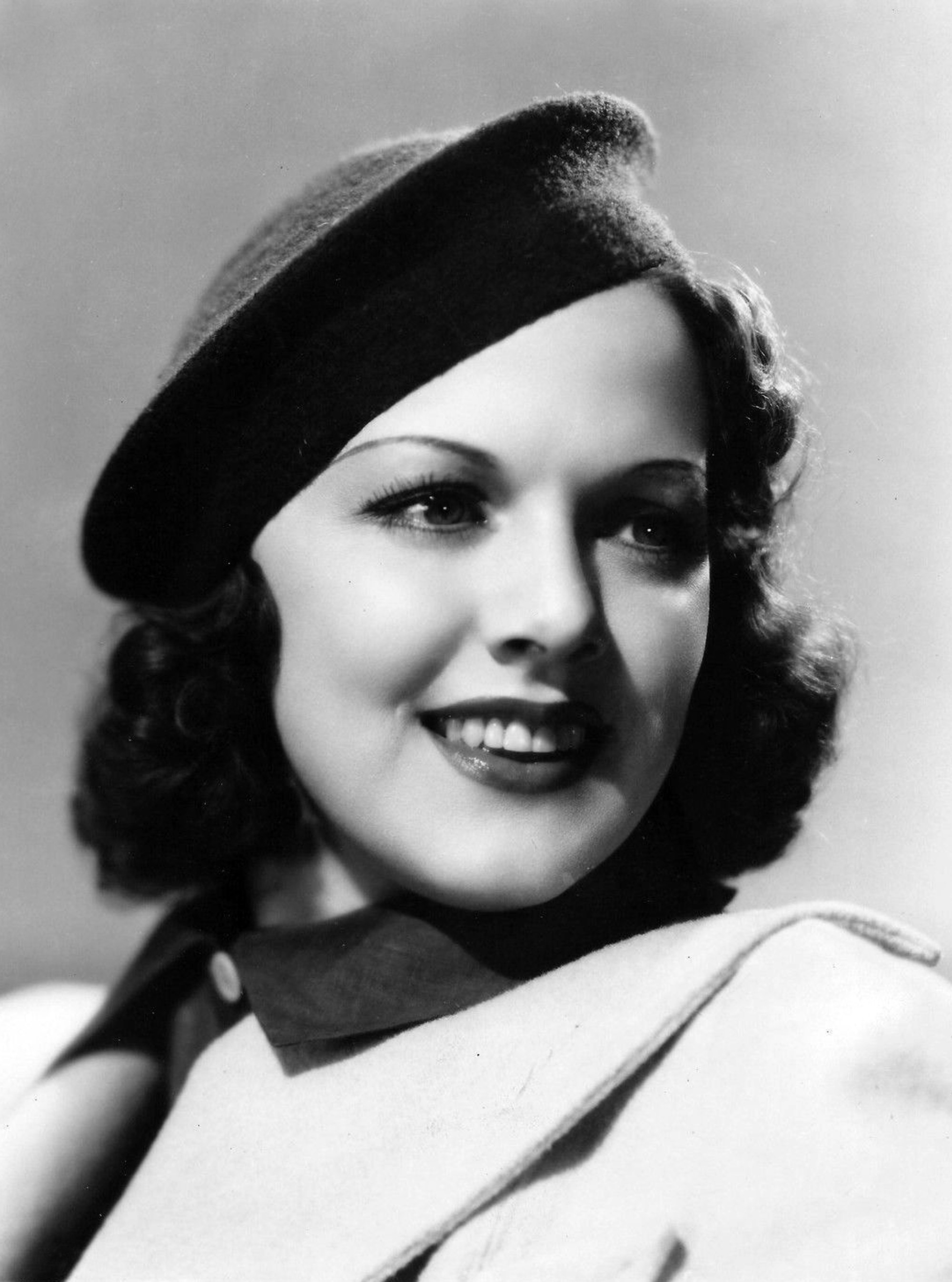
- Hughes in 1940
- Born: Catherine Mabel Hukill; January 17, 1910; Chicago, Illinois, U.S.
- Died: August 8, 1995 (aged 85); Burbank, California, U.S.
- Resting place: San Fernando Mission Cemetery
- Other name: Catherine Hughes
- Occupation: Actress
- Years active: 1935–1953
- Spouse: Frank Faylen (m. 1928; died 1985)
- Children: 2

Carol Hughes (born Catherine Mabel Hukill, January 17, 1910 – August 8, 1995) was an American actress. She is best remembered for her leading roles opposite Gene Autry and Roy Rogers, and for her role as Dale Arden in Flash Gordon Conquers the Universe (1940).

== Biography ==
Hughes was born in Chicago, Illinois, to Charles, an upholsterer, and Mable Hukill (née Stift). Both of her parents were born in Chicago; her mother's grandparents were from Germany. She was raised in a rented house at 2122 Pearl Court in Chicago along with a cousin, Pearl Hukill. As a teenager, she was drawn to acting and participated in school plays.

At the age of 14, she began acting and dancing in short musical comedies with an Oshkosh stock company. The following year, she appeared as Katie Conway in the Conway Sisters team, having learned to sing and play piano. In the late 1920s, she teamed with Frank Faylen to form the comedy dancing and singing team of Faylen and Hughes in which she played the "dumb girl" Kitty Hughes. In 1928, the 18-year-old Hughes married Frank Faylen. By the early 1930s, they were performing together in stock and vaudeville shows throughout Illinois and Wisconsin.

In 1935, Hughes and Faylen moved to Hollywood to attempt movie careers. Hughes began her film career playing bit parts in George White's 1935 Scandals (1935) and Ceiling Zero (1936). After being signed on as a contract player by Warner Bros. in 1936, her first name was changed to Carol and she began to appear in credited speaking roles, mostly in B movies. By 1937, she was appearing in leading roles in films such as Meet the Boy Friend, Marry the Girl, Renfrew of the Royal Mounted, and The Westland Case.

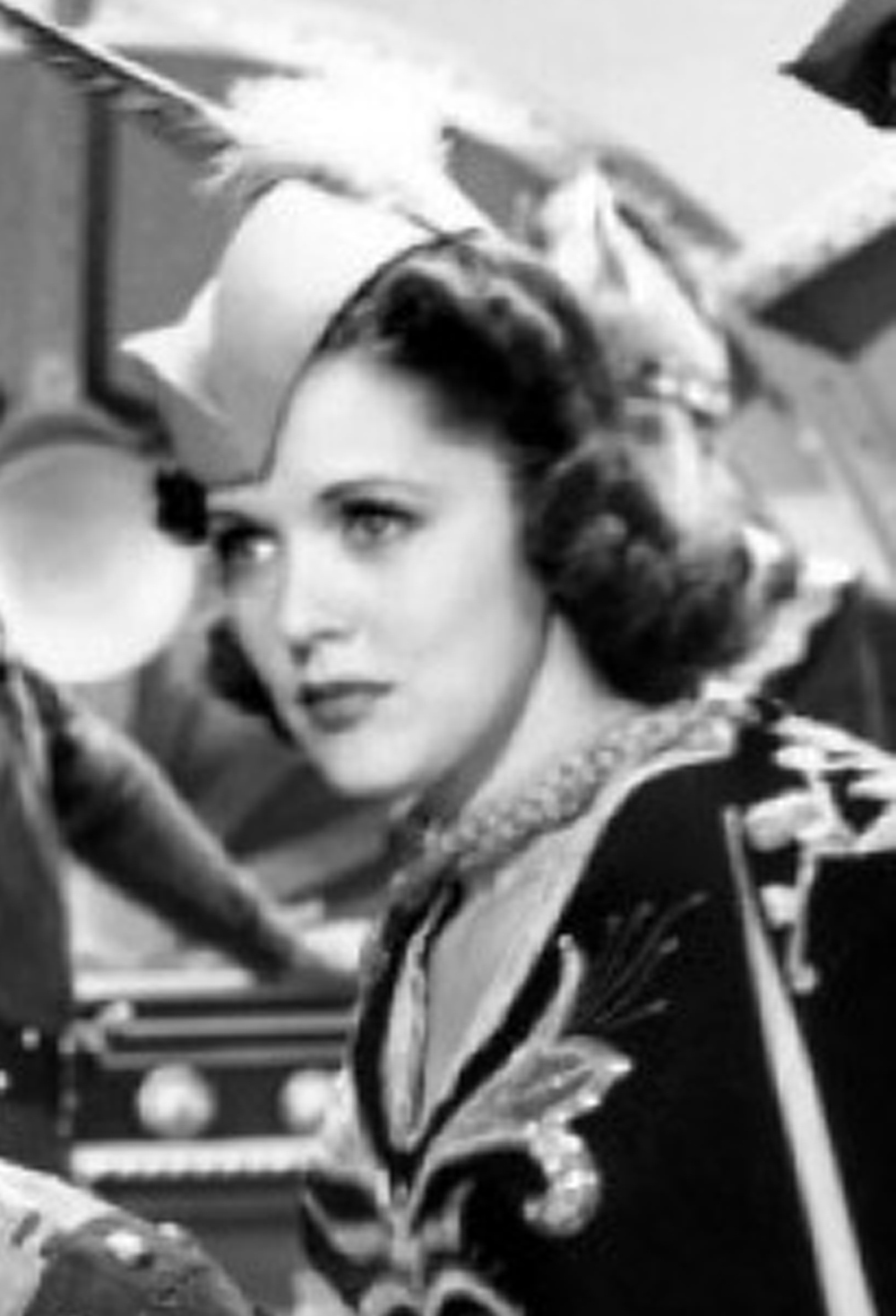
Hughes as Dale Arden in Flash Gordon Conquers the Universe, 1940

In 1938, Hughes transitioned to Western films appearing opposite Gene Autry in Gold Mine in the Sky (1938), Man from Music Mountain (1938), and Under Fiesta Stars (1941), and opposite Roy Rogers in Under Western Stars (1938). In 1940, she landed one of her best-known roles as Dale Arden in Flash Gordon Conquers the Universe (1940).

Throughout the early 1940s, Hughes appeared in leading roles in Top Sergeant Mulligan (1941), The Miracle Kid (1941), My Son, the Hero (1943), She's for Me (1943), and The Beautiful Cheat. As the decade progressed, however, she appeared increasingly in minor roles in films such as The Bachelor and the Bobby-Soxer (1947), Every Girl Should Be Married (1948), and Mighty Joe Young (1949). In 1947, Hughes returned to the stage to perform in Trouble for Rent.

Hughes made brief returns to Western films in leading roles in Home in Oklahoma (1946) with Roy Rogers, and Stagecoach Kid (1949) with Tim Holt—the latter film featured her last major screen role. Minor roles followed in D.O.A. (1950) and Scaramouche (1952). In the last years of her film career, Hughes appeared mainly in RKO film shorts and one television series episode.

Hughes' husband Frank Faylen continued working as a character actor in films and television through the 1970s. He appeared in supporting roles in numerous films, including The Pride of the Yankees (1942), The Lost Weekend (1945), Frank Capra's It's a Wonderful Life (1946) in the role of Ernie the cabdriver, Road to Rio (1948), Gunfight at the OK Corral (1965), and Funny Girl (1968). He is best-known today for playing the father Herbert T. Gillis in the television series The Many Loves of Dobie Gillis (1959-1963). Hughes and Faylen raised two daughters, Catherine (or Kay) and Carol, both of whom became actresses. Their daughter Kay was the first wife of Regis Philbin. Their daughter Carol appeared in the television series Leave It to Beaver (1962–1963) and The Bing Crosby Show (1964–1965). Hughes and Faylen remained married for 57 years until his death in 1985.

Hughes died on August 8, 1995, in Burbank, California, at the age of 85. She is buried next to her husband in San Fernando Mission Cemetery in Mission Hills, Los Angeles, California.

== Filmography ==
- George White's 1935 Scandals (1935) as Chorine (uncredited)
- Ceiling Zero (1936) as Birdie (uncredited)
- Strike Me Pink (1936) as Goldwyn Girl sitting on floor in Club Lido number about 78 minutes in the film. (uncredited)
- The Singing Kid (1936) as Mary Lou (uncredited)
- Times Square Playboy (1936) as Phyllis, a secretary (uncredited)
- The Golden Arrow (1936) as Hortense Burke-Meyers
- Earthworm Tractors (1936) as Sally Blair
- The Case of the Velvet Claws (1936) as Esther Linton
- Stage Struck (1936) as Gracie
- Polo Joe (1936) as Mary Hilton
- Three Men on a Horse (1936) as Audrey Trowbridge
- Ready, Willing and Able (1937) as Angie
- Meet the Boyfriend (1937) as June Delaney
- Marry the Girl (1937) as Virginia Radway
- Renfrew of the Royal Mounted (1937) as Virginia Bronson
- The Westland Case (1937) as Emily Lou Martin
- Under Western Stars (1938) as Eleanor Fairbanks
- Gold Mine in the Sky (1938) as Cody Langham
- Man from Music Mountain (1938) as Helen Foster
- Love Affair (1939) as Nightclub Patron (uncredited)
- The Women (1939) as Salesgirl at Modiste Salon (uncredited)
- The Day the Bookies Wept (1939) as Patsy
- Married and in Love (1940) as Jean Carter, woman in bar
- Flash Gordon Conquers the Universe (1940, Serial) as Dale Arden
- Flight Angels (1940) as Texas
- Carolina Moon (1940) as Woman at breakfast (uncredited)
- The Border Legion (1940) as Alice Randall
- Scattergood Baines (1941) as Helen Parker
- A Girl, a Guy, and a Gob (1941) as Dance Hall Girl (uncredited)
- Emergency Landing (1941) as Betty Lambert
- I'll Wait for You (1941) as Sally Travers
- Desperate Cargo (1941) as Peggy Morton
- Under Fiesta Stars (1941) as Barbara Babs Erwin
- Top Sergeant Mulligan (1941) as Avis
- The Miracle Kid (1941) as Pat Hilton
- Ship Ahoy (1942) as Merton's typing secretary (uncredited)
- I Married an Angel (1942) as Nellie Bellas (uncredited)
- Lucky Jordan (1942) as Girl in Back Room (uncredited)
- My Son, the Hero (1943) as Linda Duncan
- What's Buzzin', Cousin? (1943) as May (uncredited)
- She's for Me (1943) as Maxine LaVerne
- Week-End Pass (1944) as Maisie
- Pillow to Post (1945) as Loolie Fisher (uncredited)
- The Naughty Nineties (1945) as Tessie (uncredited)
- The Beautiful Cheat (1945) as Dolly Marsh
- Jungle Raiders (1945, Serial) as Zara, the high priestess
- The Red Dragon (1945) as Marguerite Fontan
- Girl on the Spot (1946) as Susie 'Cuddles' LaPlanche (uncredited)
- Joe Palooka, Champ (1946) as Mrs. Van Pragg
- Blondie Knows Best (1946) as Gloria Evans (uncredited)
- Home in Oklahoma (1946) as Jan Holloway
- The Bachelor and the Bobby-Soxer (1947) as Florence
- Every Girl Should Be Married (1948) as Girl at counter (uncredited)
- Slightly French (1949) as Hyde's secretary (uncredited)
- Stagecoach Kid (1949) as Birdie
- Mighty Joe Young (1949) as Nightclub Patron (uncredited)
- D.O.A. (1950) as Kitty
- Groan and Grunt (1950, Short) as Peaches Clipper
- Night Club Daze (1950, Short) as Flo
- Ghost Buster (1952, Short) as Betty Ames
- Scaramouche (1952) as Pierrette
- Fresh Painter (1953, Short) as Carol
- Lost in a Turkish Bath (1953, Short) as Peggy Peyton
- I'm the Law (1953, TV Series) as Estelle
- And Baby Makes Two (1953, Short) as Betty
- Pardon My Wrench (1953, Short) as Peggy - Andy's daughter
