= Man from Music Mountain (1938 film) =

1938 film by Joseph Kane, Betty Burbridge, Charles E. Ford

- Theatrical release poster
- Directed by: Joseph Kane
- Screenplay by: Betty Burbridge; Luci Ward
- Story by: Bernard McConville
- Produced by: Charles E. Ford (associate)
- Starring: Gene Autry; Smiley Burnette; Carol Hughes
- Cinematography: Jack A. Marta
- Edited by: Lester Orlebeck
- Production company: Republic Pictures
- Distributed by: Republic Pictures
- Release date: August 15, 1938 (U.S.)
- Running time: 58 minutes
- Country: United States
- Language: English

Man from Music Mountain is a 1938 American Western film directed by Joseph Kane and starring Gene Autry, Smiley Burnette, and Carol Hughes. Written by Betty Burbridge and Luci Ward, based on a story by Bernard McConville.

== Plot ==
A singing cowboy fights corrupt land developers who try to cheat honest ranchers who are unaware of the gold lying beneath their land.

== Cast ==
- Gene Autry as Gene Autry
- Smiley Burnette as Frog Millhouse
- Carol Hughes as Helen Foster
- Sally Payne as Patsy
- Ivan Miller as John Scanlon
- Ed Cassidy as William Brady
- Lew Kelly as Bowdie Bill
- Howard Chase as Abbott
- Al Terr as Buddy Harmon
- Frankie Marvin as Larry Higgins
- Earl Dwire as Lew Martin
- Lloyd Ingraham as George Harmon
- Lillian Drew as Mrs. Chris
- Al Taylor as Henchman Hank
- Joe Yrigoyen as Henchman Pete
- Polly Jenkins and Her Plowboys as a Musical Group
- Champion as Gene's Horse (uncredited)

== Production ==
=== Soundtracks ===
- "There's a Little Deserted Town on the Prairie" (Gene Autry, Johnny Marvin, Fred Rose) by Gene Autry and Cowboys
- "The Man from Music Mountain" (Peter Tinturin, Jack Lawrence, Eddie Cherkose) by Gene Autry, Smiley Burnette, and Cowboys
- "Love, Burning Love" (Gene Autry, Johnny Marvin, Fred Rose) by Smiley Burnette, Frankie Marvin, and an unidentified guitarist
- "All Nice People" (Smiley Burnette) by Smiley Burnette and an unidentified female quartet
- "I'm Beginning to Care" (Gene Autry, Johnny Marvin, Fred Rose) by Gene Autry
- "She Works Third Tub at the Laundry" (Smiley Burnette) by Smiley Burnette and Sally Payne
- "Untitled Instrumental" by Polly Jenkins and Her Plowboys
- "Long, Long Ago" (Thomas Haynes Bayly) by Polly Jenkins and Her Plowboys
- "William Tell Overture" (Gioachino Rossini) by Polly Jenkins and Her Plowboys
- "Good Bye, Pinto" (Gene Autry, Johnny Marvin, Fred Rose) by Gene Autry and Musicians
- "She'll Be Coming 'Round the Mountain" (Traditional)
