= Pardon my French (disambiguation) =

"Pardon my French" is a common English-language expression.

Pardon my French may also refer to:

- Pardon My French (Fuck album), 1997
- Pardon My French (Chunk! No, Captain Chunk! album), 2013
- Pardon My French (Jahari Massamba Unit album), 2020
- Pardon My French (1921 film), a silent film starring Ralph Yearsley
- Pardon My French (1951 film) or The Lady from Boston, a film starring Paul Henreid and Merle Oberon
- Pardon My French (collective), a team by DJ Snake with Tchami, Mercer and Malaa

== See also ==
- Excuse My French (disambiguation)
