= Excuse (disambiguation) =

An excuse is a defense from criminal charges.

Excuse or Excuses may also refer to:

- Rationalization (psychology)

== Music ==
- "Excuses" (song), by Mentis, 2021
- "Excuse", a song from the album Minecraft – Volume Alpha by C418
- "Excuses", a song by The Hard-Ons
- "Excuses", a song by Alanis Morissette from the 2004 album So-Called Chaos
- "Excuses", a song by AP Dhillon, Gurinder Gill, and Intense
- "Excuses", a song by Jay Chou from the 2004 album Common Jasmine Orange
- "Excuses", a song by twlv

== Other uses ==
- "Excuse" (Miranda), a 2009 television episode

== See also ==
- Excuse My French (disambiguation), various meanings
