= Nora Cecil =

English-American actress (1878–1951)

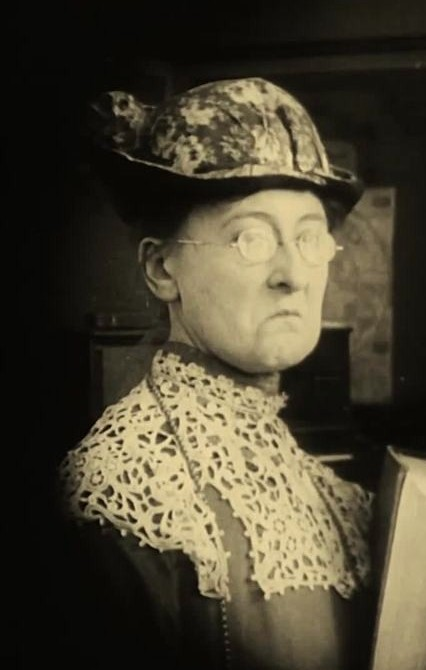
- Cecil in The Poor Little Rich Girl (1917)
- Born: September 26, 1878; London, England
- Died: May 1, 1951 (aged 72); Los Angeles, California, U.S.
- Occupation: Actress
- Years active: 1915–1947
- Children: 2

Nora Cecil (September 26, 1878 – May 1, 1951) was an English-born American actress whose 30-year career spanned both the silent and sound film eras.

== Career ==
=== Stage ===
Cecil's career began on the stage, when she debuted in London at age 19. She appeared in the Broadway production The Sleeping Beauty and the Beast, which ran for more than 240 performances at the Broadway Theatre in 1901–1902. (A 1930 newspaper article says that Cecil "made her debut, three decades ago, on the London stage.")

=== Film ===
Cecil appeared in well over 100 feature films and film shorts. In 1915, she moved from the stage into films, her first appearance being in a starring role in The Arrival of Perpetua, directed by Émile Chautard. She often played "welfare workers, landladies, schoolmistresses and maiden aunts".

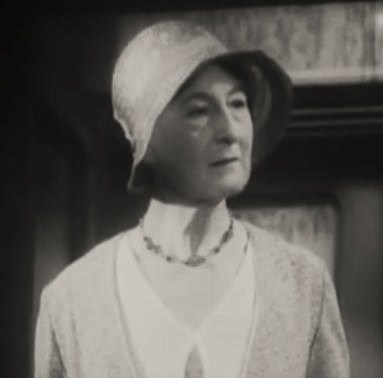
Cecil in Street Scene (1931)

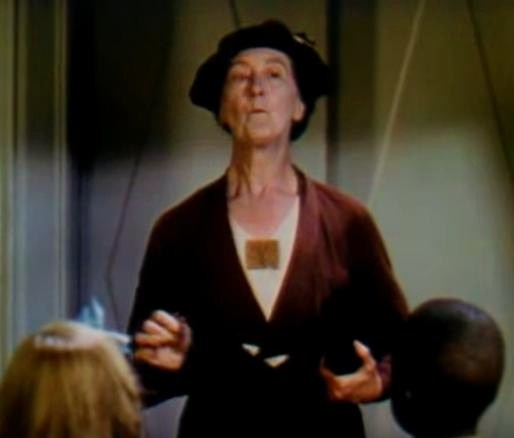
Cecil in Nothing Sacred (1937)

One of the most significant roles was in the W.C. Fields vehicle The Old Fashioned Way in 1934. Some of the other notable films in which Cecil appeared include Ernst Lubitsch's historical romance The Merry Widow, starring Maurice Chevalier and Jeanette MacDonald; the 1939 version of The Adventures of Huckleberry Finn, starring Mickey Rooney; and the John Ford classic Stagecoach, with John Wayne.

Her final acting performance was in a small role as Louisa Ames in Mourning Becomes Electra in 1947, starring Rosalind Russell.

== Personal life and death ==
Cecil was married to real estate broker Russell Evans, who died in 1949. They had two children: Dorothy Cecil, who was also an actress, with a short stage-career, and Kenneth Russell Evans, who became a petroleum engineer.

She was cremated.

== Filmography ==
(Per AFI database)

- The Arrival of Perpetua (1915)
- Alias Jimmy Valentine (1915)
- The Wild Girl (1917, as Norah Cecile)
- Royal Romance (1917)
- The Little Duchess (1917)
- American Buds (1918)
- By Hook or Crook (1918)
- The Love Net (1918)
- The Zero Hour (1918)
- The Appearance of Evil (1918)
- The Power and the Glory (1918)
- Prunella (1918)
- Miss Crusoe (1919)
- Woman, Woman! (1919)
- Red Foam (1920)
- The Daughter Pays (1920)
- Footfalls (1921, uncredited)
- Manslaughter (1922)
- Darwin Was Right (1924)
- The Deadwood Coach (1924)
- Lightnin' (1925, uncredited)
- His Majesty, Bunker Bean (1925)
- Born to Battle (1926, uncredited)
- Chip of the Flying U (1926)
- Midnight Faces (1926)
- The Passionate Quest (1926)
- The Demi-Bride (1927)
- The Devil Dancer (1927)
- The Fortune Hunter (1927)
- Sensation Seekers (1927)
- Born to Battle (1927)
- The Silent Rider (1927)
- A Trick of Hearts (1928)
- The Big City (1928)
- The Cavalier (1928)
- The Baby Cyclone (1928)
- Driftwood (1928)
- Seven Footprints to Satan (1929)
- The Little Accident (1930)
- Only Saps Work (1930)
- Outward Bound (1930)
- Seven Days Leave (1930)
- Street Scene (1931)
- Caught Plastered (1931)
- The Ruling Voice (1931)
- Stepping Sisters (1932)
- Doctor Bull (1933)
- The Bitter Tea of General Yen (1933)
- Peg O' My Heart (1933)
- Design for Living (1933)
- Laughing Boy (1934)
- The Old Fashioned Way (1934)
- You're Telling Me! (1934)
- Upperworld (1934)
- 6 Day Bike Rider (1934)
- Glamour (1934)
- Chained (1934)
- The Merry Widow (1934)
- Pursued (1934)
- Search for Beauty (1934)
- Once to Every Woman (1934)
- Gold Diggers of 1935 (1935)
- Collegiate (1935)
- Car 99 (1935)
- Way Down East (1935)
- Vagabond Lady (1935)
- Woman Wanted (1935)
- Grand Exit (1935)
- Memories and Melodies (1935), a short about American composer Stephen Foster of Kentucky trying to sell a song at a local shop. She played a grumpy customer.
- Dancing Pirate (1936)
- Poppy (1936)
- Fury (1936)
- Career Woman (1936)
- College Holiday (1936)
- Girl of the Ozarks (1936)
- Little Miss Nobody (1936)
- Laughing at Trouble (1936)
- We Went to College (1936)
- Nothing Sacred (1937)
- Champagne Waltz (1937)
- The Mighty Treve (1937)
- Easy Living (1937)
- Night of Mystery (1937)
- Blossoms on Broadway (1937)
- Borrowing Trouble (1937)
- She Asked for It (1937)
- Partners in Crime (1937)
- King of Alcatraz (1938)
- Mr. Boggs Steps Out (1938)
- International Settlement (1938)
- No Time to Marry (1938)
- The Adventures of Huckleberry Finn (1939)
- Stagecoach (1939) as Boone's Landlady (uncredited)
- The Story of Alexander Graham Bell (1939)
- Union Pacific (1939)
- Saint Louis Blues (1939)
- What a Life (1939)
- Anne of Windy Poplars (1940)
- Lucky Partners (1940)
- Those Were the Days! (1940)
- The Captain Is a Lady (1940)
- Young People (1940)
- Queen of the Mob (1940)
- A Girl, a Guy and a Gob (1941)
- It Started with Eve (1941)
- Three Girls About Town (1941)
- Unexpected Uncle (1941)
- Little Men (1941)
- Apache Trail (1942)
- Call Out the Marines (1942)
- Daring Young Man (1942)
- I Married a Witch (1942) as Harriet Wooley
- Jail House Blues (1942)
- Obliging Young Lady (1942)
- Tish (1942)
- The Wife Takes a Flyer (1942)
- The Unknown Guest (1943)
- The Miracle of Morgan's Creek (1944)
- Together Again (1944)
- The Thin Man Goes Home (1945)
- Lady on a Train (1945)
- Molly and Me (1945)
- Johnny Comes Flying Home (1946)
- The Kid from Brooklyn (1946)
- The Missing Lady (1946)
- No Leave, No Love (1946)
- Two Sisters from Boston (1946)
- Hollywood Bound (1946)
- Mourning Becomes Electra (1947)
- The Sea of Grass (1947)
