= Toby Wing =

American actress (1915–2001)

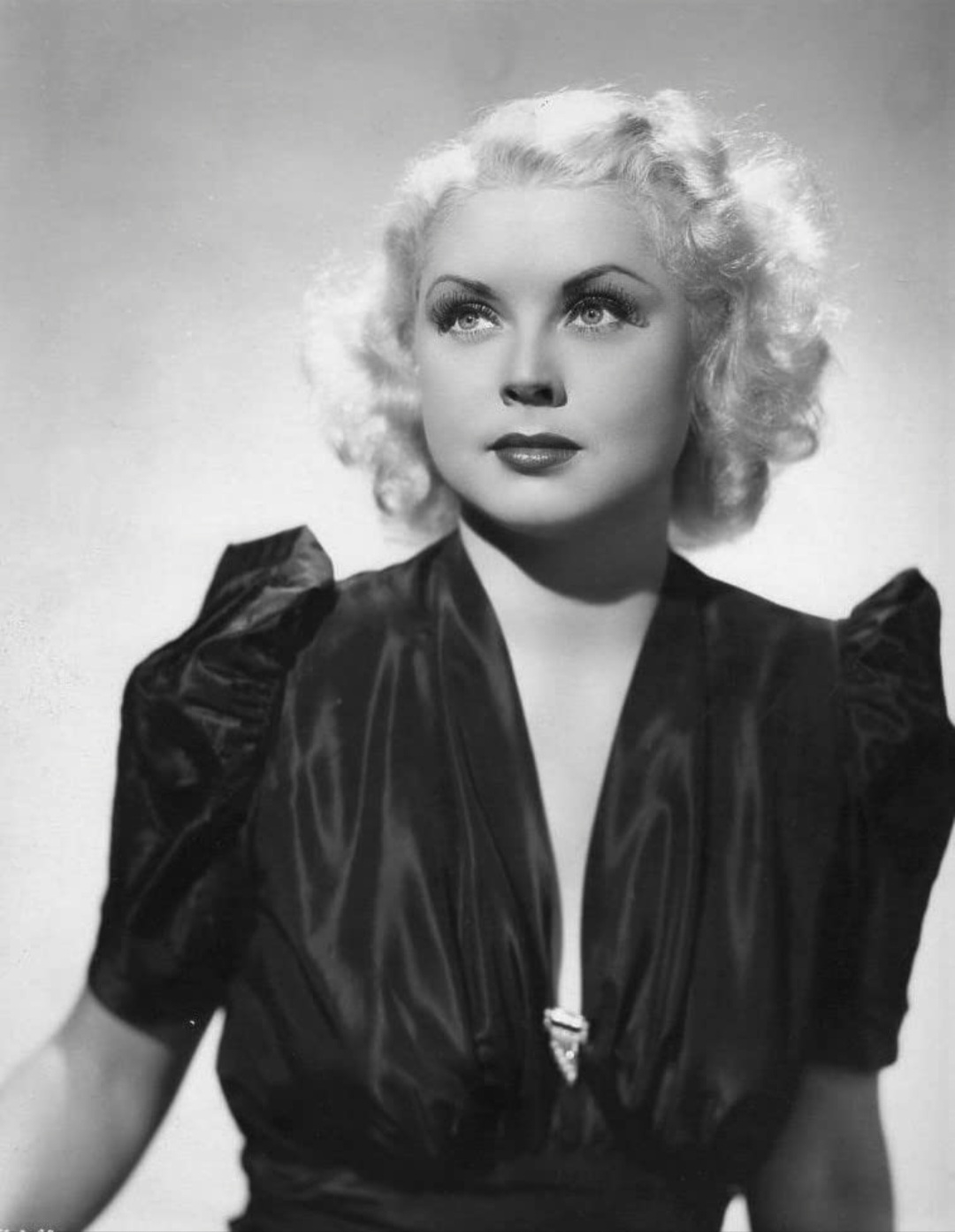
- Wing in Mr. Boggs Steps Out (1938)
- Born: Martha Virginia Wing; July 14, 1915; Amelia Court House, Virginia, U.S.
- Died: March 22, 2001 (aged 85); Mathews, Virginia, U.S.
- Resting place: Christ Church Kingston Parish Cemetery, Mathews County, Virginia
- Occupation: Actress
- Years active: 1924–1938
- Spouse: Dick Merrill (m. 1938; died 1982)
- Children: 2

Toby Wing (July 14, 1915 – March 22, 2001) was an American actress and showgirl. Wing appeared in over 60 productions in the 1920s and 1930s and was awarded a star on the Walk of Fame in 1960.

== Early years ==
Wing was born Martha Virginia Wing in Amelia Court House, Virginia, to Paul R. Wing (1892 – 1957), an Army Reserve officer and assistant director for Paramount Pictures, and Martha Wing (née Thraves; 1893 – 1981). She had an older sister, Gertrude, also known as Patricia, who was also an actress and chorus girl, and a younger brother, Paul Jr. As a child, her family nicknamed her Toby. She and her family lived in Panama and El Paso, Texas before they settled in California in 1927. Wing claimed to be the grandniece of English playwright Sir Arthur Wing Pinero at the beginning of her career, but historical documents don't support that claim.

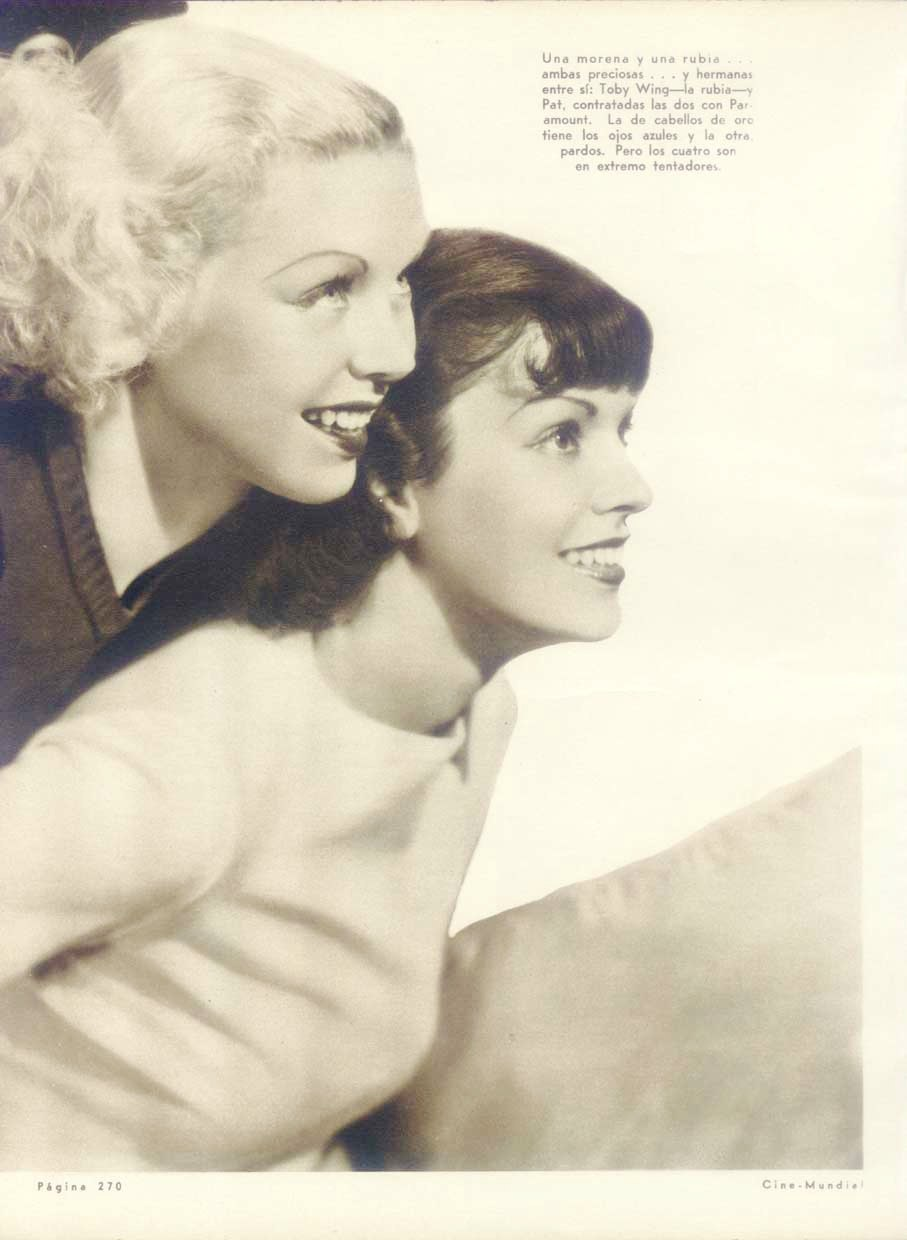
Toby and sister Pat

== Career ==
Wing began working on-screen at age of nine, getting a few bit parts in silent movies through her father's job. In 1931 she became one of the first Goldwyn Girls, and she started her film career in Palmy Days (1932). In 1932 she was seen in Mack Sennett-produced comedies made by Paramount, one starring Bing Crosby. Wing made an impression with producers and moviegoers, but she seldom broke through to leading roles.

Many of her roles were small and barely clothed, before the introduction of the 1934 Production Code. She became widely recognized as a sex symbol, once being described as the most beautiful chorus girl in all of Hollywood. Since her contracted studio was mired in bankruptcy during much of her career, her work was done on loan, primarily at Warner Bros. After her contract expired, she appeared in low-budget projects on a per-film basis. Wing enjoyed a far more successful sideline doing product endorsements and was featured in innumerable fan magazines from 1933–1938.

Wing played a few leading roles in B features and short subjects. In 1936 and 1937, she worked opposite singer-songwriter Pinky Tomlin in two of his low-budget musical features, With Love and Kisses and Sing While You're Able.

Her last leading role was in The Marines Come Thru. Although filmed in Florida in 1938, it did not see general release until 1943 as Fight On, Marines! Wing completed her acting career on Broadway in the unsuccessful 1938 Cole Porter musical You Never Know, which starred Lupe Vélez, Clifton Webb, Libby Holman, and J. Harold Murray.

On February 8, 1960, Wing was honored with a star on the Hollywood Walk of Fame located at 6561 Hollywood Boulevard.

== Personal life ==
She was well known off-screen for her romances, linked to famous individuals such as Maurice Chevalier, Alfred Vanderbilt, Franklin Roosevelt Jr. Wing was engaged twice, first to Jackie Coogan in 1935 and then to Pinky Tomlin in 1937, but neither resulted in marriage.

Wing married a pilot named Henry "Dick" Merrill on October 19, 1938, in Fredericksburg, Virginia. She retired from movies after marrying.

Wing and Merrill had two sons together: Henry Merrill, Jr. (1939 – 1940) and Richard Wing Merrill (1940 – 1982). Henry, Jr. died at 11 months old; Time reported the child suffocated after he became entangled in his bedclothes. After his death, Wing and Merrill moved from Forest Hills to Miami, where their second son, Richard, also known as Ricky, was born. Tragically, Richard and his friend, Dori Colyer, were victims of a double homicide that occurred in May 1981 in Brooksville, Florida. As of September 2026, the case remains unsolved, and Crime Stoppers in Hernando County was offering a $5,000 reward for information.

In Miami, Merrill flew the Eastern Airlines route from New York to Miami until his retirement and Wing found success in real estate in California and Florida. They later moved to Virginia, where Merrill managed the Shannon Air Museum in Fredericksburg until his death in 1982.

Wing died on March 22, 2001, at the age of 85, at her home in Mathews, Virginia. She is interred at Christ Church Kingston Parish Cemetery in Mathews County, beside her husband and two sons.

== Filmography ==
Features:

- A Boy of Flanders (1924) - Little Girl (uncredited)
- A Woman Who Sinned (1924) - (uncredited)
- Circe, the Enchantress (1924) - Little Girl (uncredited)
- He Who Gets Slapped (1924) - Playing Child (uncredited)
- Percy (1925) - Little Girl (uncredited)
- The Shining Adventure (1925) - Little Girl (uncredited)
- Zander the Great (1925) - Little Girl (uncredited)
- Marry Me (1925) - Little Girl (uncredited)
- The Pony Express (1925) - Child (uncredited)
- American Pluck (1925) - Flower Girl at Coronation (uncredited)
- Dollar Down (1925) - Little Girl
- Double Daring (1926) - Nan
- Palmy Days (1931) - Goldwyn Girl (uncredited)
- The Kid from Spain (1932) - Goldwyn Girl (uncredited)
- The King's Vacation (1933) - Autograph Seeker at Casino (uncredited)
- 42nd Street (1933) - Blonde in 'Young and Healthy' Number (uncredited)
- The Little Giant (1933) - Society Girl (uncredited)
- Central Airport (1933) - Air Show Observer (uncredited)
- Private Detective 62 (1933) - Free's Girl Friend (uncredited)
- College Humor (1933) - Student (uncredited)
- It's Great to Be Alive (1933) - Blonde that Kisses Carlos (uncredited)
- Baby Face (1933) - Office Worker (uncredited)
- She Had to Say Yes (1933) - Model (uncredited)
- Arizona to Broadway (1933) - Chambermaid (uncredited)
- This Day and Age (1933) - Student (uncredited)
- Torch Singer (1933) - Blonde in Sally's apartment (uncredited)
- Search for Beauty (1934) - Sally Palmer
- School for Girls (1934) - Hazel Jones
- Come on Marines (1934) - Dolly
- Murder at the Vanities (1934) - Nancy
- Kiss and Make-Up (1934) - Consuelo of Claghorne
- Student Tour (1934) - Student (uncredited)
- One Hour Late (1934) - Maizie
- Two for Tonight (1935) - College Girl (uncredited)
- Forced Landing (1935) - Amelie Darrell
- Thoroughbred (1936) - Anne O'Malley
- Mr. Cinderella (1936) - Lulu, the Cashier
- With Love and Kisses (1936) - Barbara Holbrook
- Silks and Saddles (1936) - Marion Braddock / Jane Smith
- Sing While You're Able (1937) - Joan Williams
- The Women Men Marry (1937) - Sugar
- True Confession (1937) - Suzanne Baggart
- Mr. Boggs Steps Out (1938) - Irene Lee
- The Marines Come Thru (1938) - Linda Dale
- Sweethearts (1938) - Telephone Operator (uncredited)

Short Subjects:

- Jimmy's New Yacht (1932) - One of Charlie's Girlfriends
- The Loud Mouth (1932) - Nurse (uncredited)
- The Candid Camera (1932) - Betty Swan
- Alaska Love (1932) - Blonde by River (uncredited)
- Ma's Pride and Joy (1932) - Radio Director's Secretary
- Blue of the Night (1933) - Blonde in Bathing Suit (uncredited)
- Rhythm on the Roof (1934) - Bob's Fantasy Sweetheart
- Star Night at the Cocoanut Grove (1934) - Herself
- Hollywood Extra Girl (1935)
- La Fiesta de Santa Barbara (1935) - Herself
- Hill-Tillies (1936) - Toby
- Rhythmitis (1936) - Lola Green
- Sunday Night at the Trocadero (1937) - Toby Wing
