= Smart Girl =

Smart Girl may refer to:

- "Smart Girl" (Drake & Josh), an episode of Drake & Josh
- Smart Girl (film), a 1935 film starring Ida Lupino
