= Silks and Saddles =

Silks and Saddles may refer to:

- Silks and Saddles (1921 film), an Australian film
- Silks and Saddles (1929 film), an American drama film
- Silks and Saddles (1936 film), an American film
