= Barbara Luddy =

American actress (1908–1979)

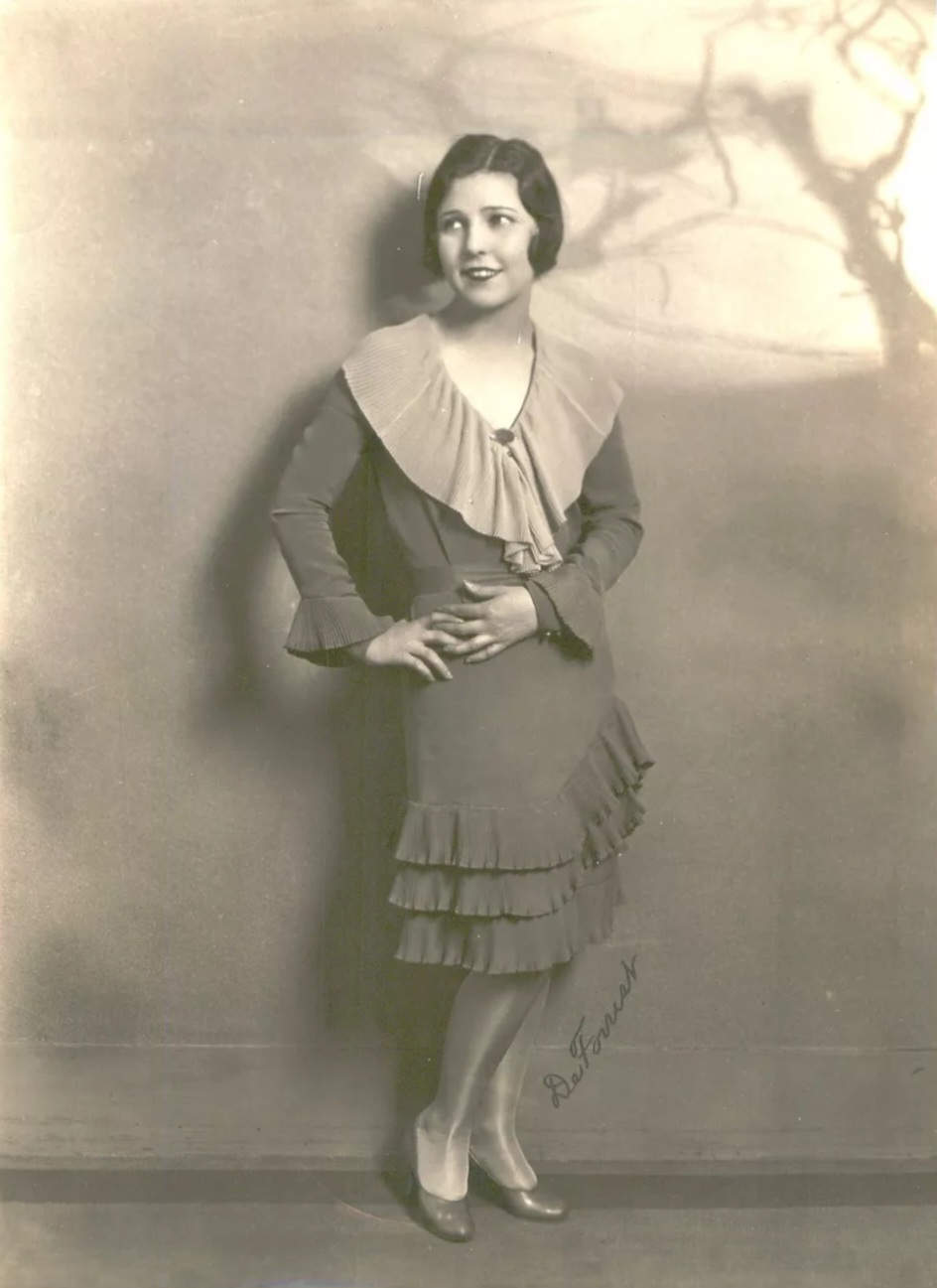
- Luddy in 1929
- Born: May 25, 1908; Great Falls, Montana, U.S.
- Died: April 1, 1979 (aged 70); Los Angeles, California, U.S.
- Occupation: Actress
- Years active: 1927–1977
- Known for: Original voice of Kanga from the first three Winnie The Pooh featurettes and in The Many Adventures of Winnie the Pooh; Original voice of Lady in Lady and the Tramp; Original voice of Merryweather in Sleeping Beauty
- Spouse: R. Ned LeFevre (m. 1942)
- Children: 2

Barbara Luddy (May 25, 1908 – April 1, 1979) was an American actress best known for her voiceover work for Walt Disney Studios in the 1950s, 1960s and 1970s.

== Early life ==
Born in Great Falls, Montana on May 25, 1908, Luddy was the daughter of Will and Molly Luddy of Helena, Montana. She sang in Vaudeville as a child. She attended Ursuline Convent in Great Falls, Montana.

== Career ==
=== Stage ===
In 1929, Luddy toured with Leo Carrillo in Australia as part of a touring company that presented the play Lombardi, Ltd. A review in the Sydney Morning Herald cited Luddy's work portraying a mannequin as "a role in which Miss Barbara Luddy made a great hit by her pert audacity and vivaciousness."

=== Radio ===
Luddy was a member of the dramatic cast of the Chicago Theater of the Air. One of Luddy's better known roles on radio was being a regular performer on The First Nighter Program from 1936 until the series ended in 1953. In 1937, she and fellow First Nighter actor Les Tremayne set what a contemporary newspaper article called "a precedent ... when these signed long term contracts calling for their exclusive services" on the program."

She also played Veronica Gunn in the comedy Great Gunns. In soap operas, she played Judith Clark in Lonely Women Carol Evans Martin in The Road of Life, and Janet Munson in Woman in White.

=== Film ===
Luddy's film career began with silent pictures in the late 1920s. She is perhaps best remembered for her voice work in Disney animated films such as Lady and the Tramp (in which she played the titular Lady), Sleeping Beauty, One Hundred and One Dalmatians, Robin Hood and the Winnie-the-Pooh featurettes including Winnie the Pooh and the Honey Tree, Winnie the Pooh and the Blustery Day, and Winnie the Pooh and Tigger Too, all of which were edited into the composite feature The Many Adventures of Winnie the Pooh. Her other film credits include Terrified (1962) and the TV film Lost Flight (1969).

=== Television ===
Luddy guest starred in episodes of such television programs as Hazel, Dragnet, Adam-12, and Kolchak: The Night Stalker.

== Personal life ==
Luddy married R. Ned LeFevre, an actor and announcer, on September 18, 1942. They had two children.

On April 1, 1979, Luddy succumbed to lung cancer. She was 70-years-old at the time of her death, dying just one month before her 71st birthday.

== Filmography ==
Year	Title	Role	Notes
1925	An Enemy of Men	Janet	
1925	Sealed Lips	Alice Howard	
1925	Rose of the World	Cecilia Kirby	
1927	Born to Battle	Barbara Barstow	
1927	Wilful Youth		
1928	See You Later		
1930	Headin' North	Mary Jackson	
1933	Her Secret	Mae	
1955	Lady and the Tramp	Lady	Voice
1959	Sleeping Beauty	Merryweather	Voice
1961	One Hundred and One Dalmatians	Rover	Voice
1963	Terrified	Mrs. Hawley	
1964	Dear Heart	Miss Carmichael	Uncredited
1966	Winnie the Pooh and the Honey Tree	Kanga	Voice
1968	The Shakiest Gun in the West	Screaming Woman	Uncredited
1968	Winnie the Pooh and the Blustery Day	Kanga	Voice
1973	Robin Hood	Mother Sexton (church mouse), Mother Rabbit	Voice, Uncredited
1974	Winnie the Pooh and Tigger Too!	Kanga	Voice
1977	The Many Adventures of Winnie the Pooh	Kanga	Voice, Archive footage
