= The Branded Woman =

1920 American film by Albert Parker

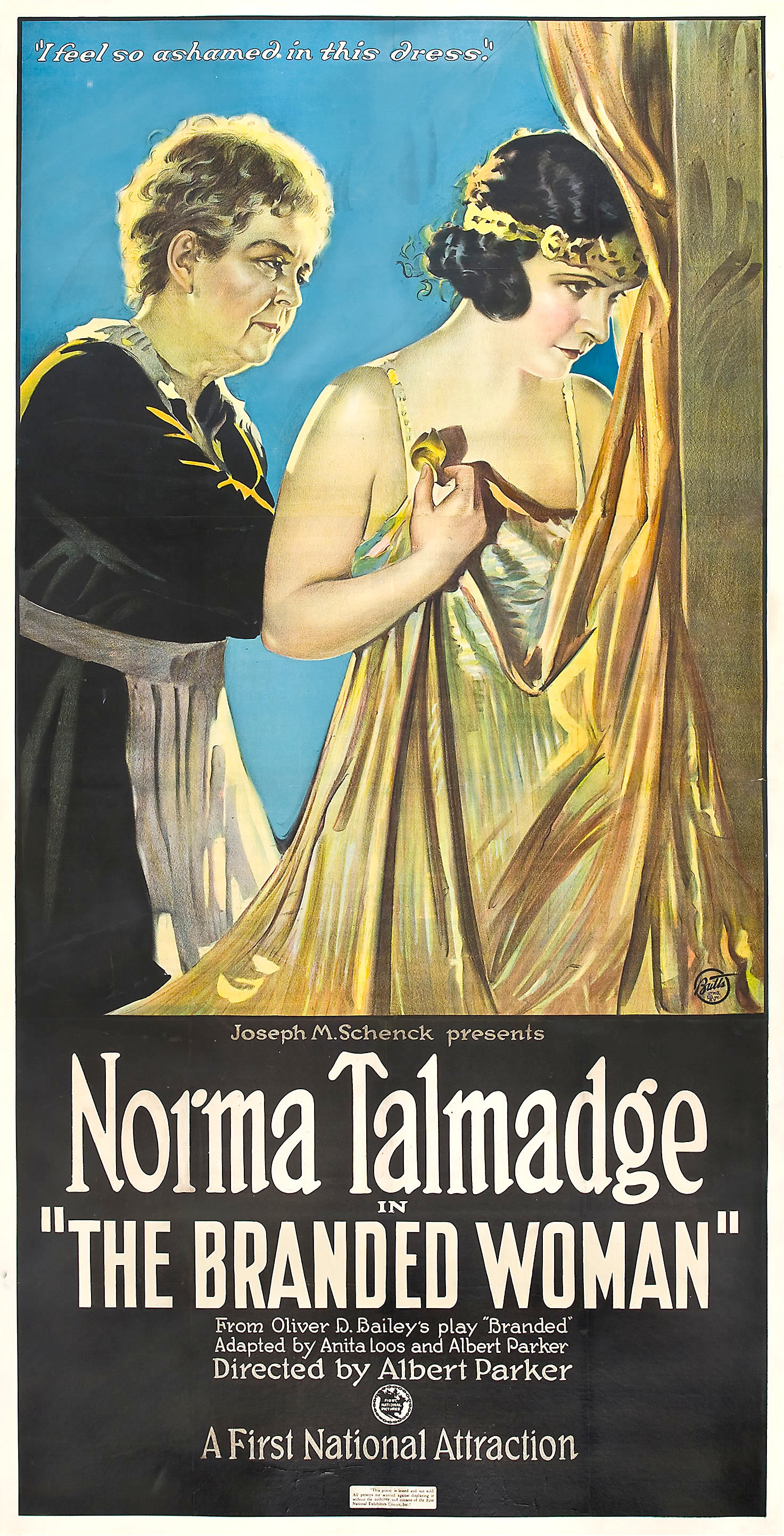
- 1920 theatrical poster
- Directed by: Albert Parker
- Written by: Anita Loos (adaptation); Albert Parker (adaptation); Burns Mantle (intertitles)
- Based on: Branded by Oliver D. Bailey
- Produced by: Joseph M. Schenck; Norma Talmadge
- Starring: Norma Talmadge; Percy Marmont
- Cinematography: J. Roy Hunt
- Distributed by: First National Pictures
- Release date: October 4, 1920
- Running time: 84 minutes
- Country: United States
- Language: Silent (English intertitles)

The Branded Woman is a 1920 American silent drama film released by First National Pictures. It stars Norma Talmadge who also produced the film along with her husband Joseph M. Schenck through their production company, Norma Talmadge Productions. The film is based on a 1917 Broadway play Branded, by Oliver D. Bailey and was adapted for the screen by Anita Loos and Albert Parker who also directed.

== Plot ==
As described in a film magazine, Ruth Sawyer is the unhappy victim of a notorious marriage between her parents. Her grandfather Judge Whitlock disowns his son and makes the wife Dot Belmar swear never to claim her daughter. The judge adopts Ruth under the name Sawyer and is known to her only as her guardian. Dot is now associated with Velvet Craft who runs a gambling house. Dot decides to hit at the judge through Ruth by breaking her promise and goes to see her at a fashionable boarding school. Dot is recognized as a notorious woman and Ruth is dismissed as an undesirable student. Her mother takes Ruth to the gambling den and initiates her to its loathsome secrets. When the judge returns from Europe, he immediately goes to Ruth and saves her from the degradation of such a life. Later he has the den closed. Ruth is broken up over her branded name. The judge introduces her to Douglas Courtenay, a youthful British diplomat. Douglas is recalled to Paris where a valuable post is awarded him. The Judge and Ruth cross over to Europe on the same ship. Following her grandfather's advice, Ruth does not tell Douglas her story. Several years pass, and Ruth and Douglas are happy in Paris with their baby daughter, and Douglas has steadily advanced in his career. Velvet enters Ruth's life, and she gives him money to buy his silence. She slips, however, when she gives Velvet several large pearls from a necklace. The firm where her husband bought it discovers this when he brings the necklace to add two more pearls. The jewelry house puts a detective on Ruth and Velvet's trail. Ruth finally is forced to confess, and Douglas puts the wrong light on her explanation and says his faith in her is destroyed. Ruth returns to her grandfather's house. Several months later Douglas, thoroughly repentant, finds her, and they leave in happiness.

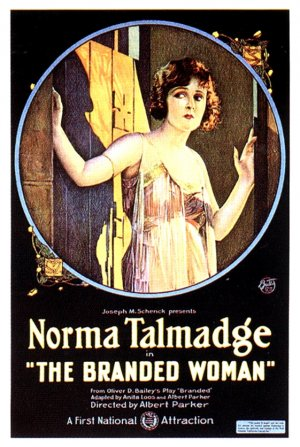
window poster

== Cast ==
- Norma Talmadge as Ruth Sawyer
- Percy Marmont as Douglas Courtenay
- Vincent Serrano as Velvet Craft
- George Fawcett as Judge Whitlock
- Grace Studdiford as Dot Belmar (aka Grace Van Studdiford)
- Gaston Glass as William Whitlock
- Jean Armour as Mrs. Bolton
- Edna Murphy as Vivian Bolton
- Henry Carvill as Henry Bolton (credited as H.J. Carvill)
- Charles Lane as Herbert Averill
- Sidney Herbert as Detective
- Edouard Durand as Jeweler
- Henrietta Floyd as Miss Weir

== Preservation status ==
A print of The Branded Woman is preserved in the Library of Congress collection.
