= Ralph Yearsley =

British character actor

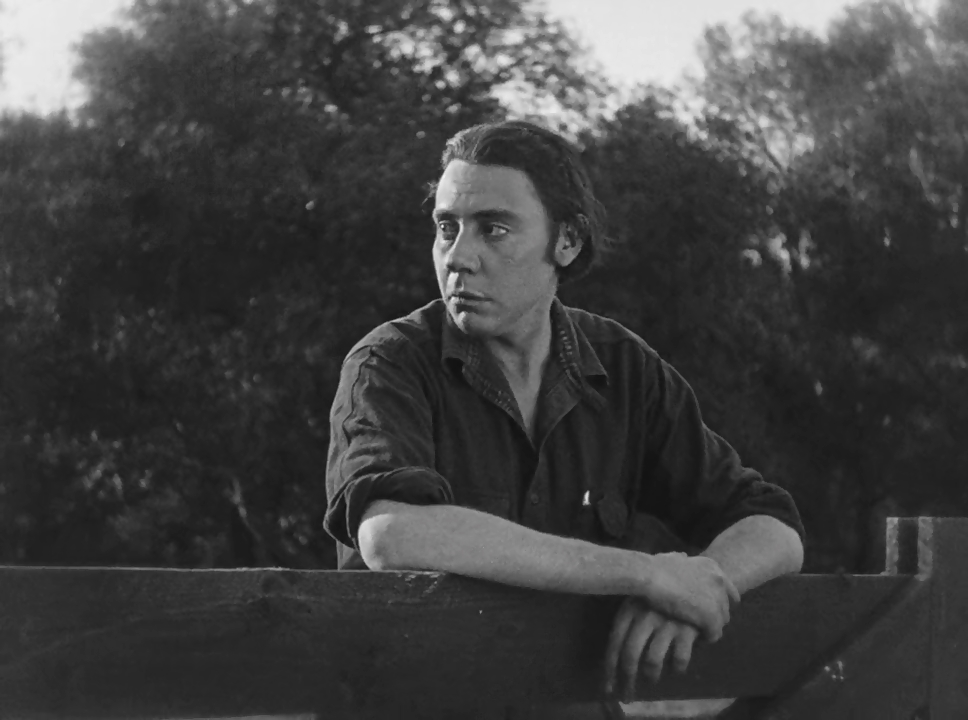
- in The Kid Brother, 1927
- Born: October 6, 1896; London, England
- Died: December 4, 1928 (aged 32)

Ralph Yearsley (October 6, 1896 – December 4, 1928) was a British-born character actor who worked in Hollywood films.

== Early life and education ==
Born in London, England, he was trained in a medical school, but left for the United States to pursue a career in the film industry.

== Career ==
He made his motion picture debut in 1921 in a secondary but good role in the Goldwyn Pictures silent film comedy Pardon My French directed by Sidney Olcott. That same year he appeared as Saul "Little Buzzard" Hatburn in Tol'able David, directed by Henry King for Inspiration Pictures. The acclaimed film was voted a Photoplay magazine's medal of honor. Over the next eight years, Yearsley appeared in another twenty films, in secondary or minor roles. One of his more notable roles was in Harold Lloyd's 1927 film The Kid Brother.

== Personal life ==
He was married to Grace Yearsley (1895–1967) with whom he had a daughter.
In 1928, Ralph Yearsley committed suicide and was interred in the Forest Lawn Memorial Park Cemetery in the Hollywood Hills.

== Partial filmography ==
- Pardon My French (1921)
- Tol'able David (1921)
- Tom Mix in Arabia (1922)
- The Village Blacksmith (1922)
- A Chapter in Her Life (1923)
- Anna Christie (1923)
- The Call of the Canyon (1923)
- One Night in Rome (1924)
- Another Man's Wife (1924)
- The Fighting Sap (1924)
- The Valley of Hate (1924)
- The Gambling Fool (1925)
- Desert Gold (1926)
- The Kid Brother (1927)
- Born to Battle (1927)
- Rose Marie (1928)
- The Little Shepherd of Kingdom Come (1928)
- The Big Killing (1928)
