= Grace Van Studdiford =

American actress

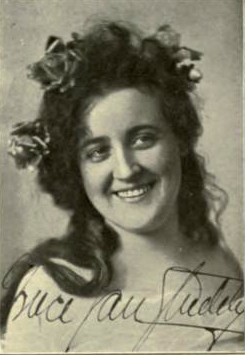
- Born: Grace Quivey; January 8, 1873; North Manchester, Indiana
- Died: January 29, 1927 (aged 54); Ft. Wayne, Indiana
- Other names: Grace Studdiford; Grace Studiford
- Occupations: Actress, singer
- Years active: 1890s–1920s
- Spouse: Charles Van Studdiford (1897–1908)

Grace Van Studdiford (née Quivey; January 8, 1873 – January 29, 1927) was an early twentieth-century American operatic soprano and actress. She never recorded for gramophone but made a few motion pictures. Her Broadway roles are limited as she toured all over the country.

== Early life ==
Grace Quivey was born in North Manchester, Indiana to August Jane Burns and Robert E. Quivey. She had four siblings; Iva Maude Quivey, Ralph B. Quivey, Mary Quivey Gregory and Claude E. Quivey a miniature portrait artist. She made her first appearance on the stage in Chicago in The Black Hussar. In 1899 she toured with Jefferson De Angelis in The Jolly Musketeer. After her tour with De Angelis she started to perform opera and on October 24, 1900, appeared at the Metropolitan Opera House in the title role of Martha. She also appeared there as Michaela in Carmen, Marguerite in Faust, Fleur-de-Lys in Esmerelda, Josephine in H.M.S. Pinafore and Leonora in Il trovatore.

== Stardom ==
In 1903 Van Studdiford opened the opera Maid Marian and later debuted The Red Feather which was specially written for her. This opera also boasted some of the most elaborate costumes up to that date. She played in and toured The Red Feather for two years. After touring with The Red Feather, Van Studdiford chose her next title part in the opera Lady Teazle which was not performed on Broadway but at several popular music halls throughout the country. In July 1908 she was back on Broadway in The Mimic World. In October 1908 she was at New York's Broadway Theater as Ilma Walden in The Golden Butterfly and toured this opera into 1909. 1910 found Van Studdiford in the popular opera The Bohemian Girl in the part of Arline. In late 1910 she toured in A Bridal Trip before bringing it to Broadway's Herald Square Theater in January 1911 under the name The Paradise of Mahomet. In 1911 she appeared at the Winter Garden Theatre in La Belle Paree as Mimi and later toured in A Bridal Trip now renamed The Paradise of Mahomet. In 1914 Van Studdiford toured the US in Oh! Oh! Delphine playing the title character. Her last recorded performance in an opera or play is in the musical comedy A Trip to Chinatown as Mrs Guyer. In this play Van Studdiford toured many military camps as World War I wound to a finish. This musical was later made into a 1926 silent movie by Fox Studios. After her last stage credit in 1918, she appeared in a small number of silent films using the name Grace Studiford and Grace Studdiford, her last film credit being in 1921.

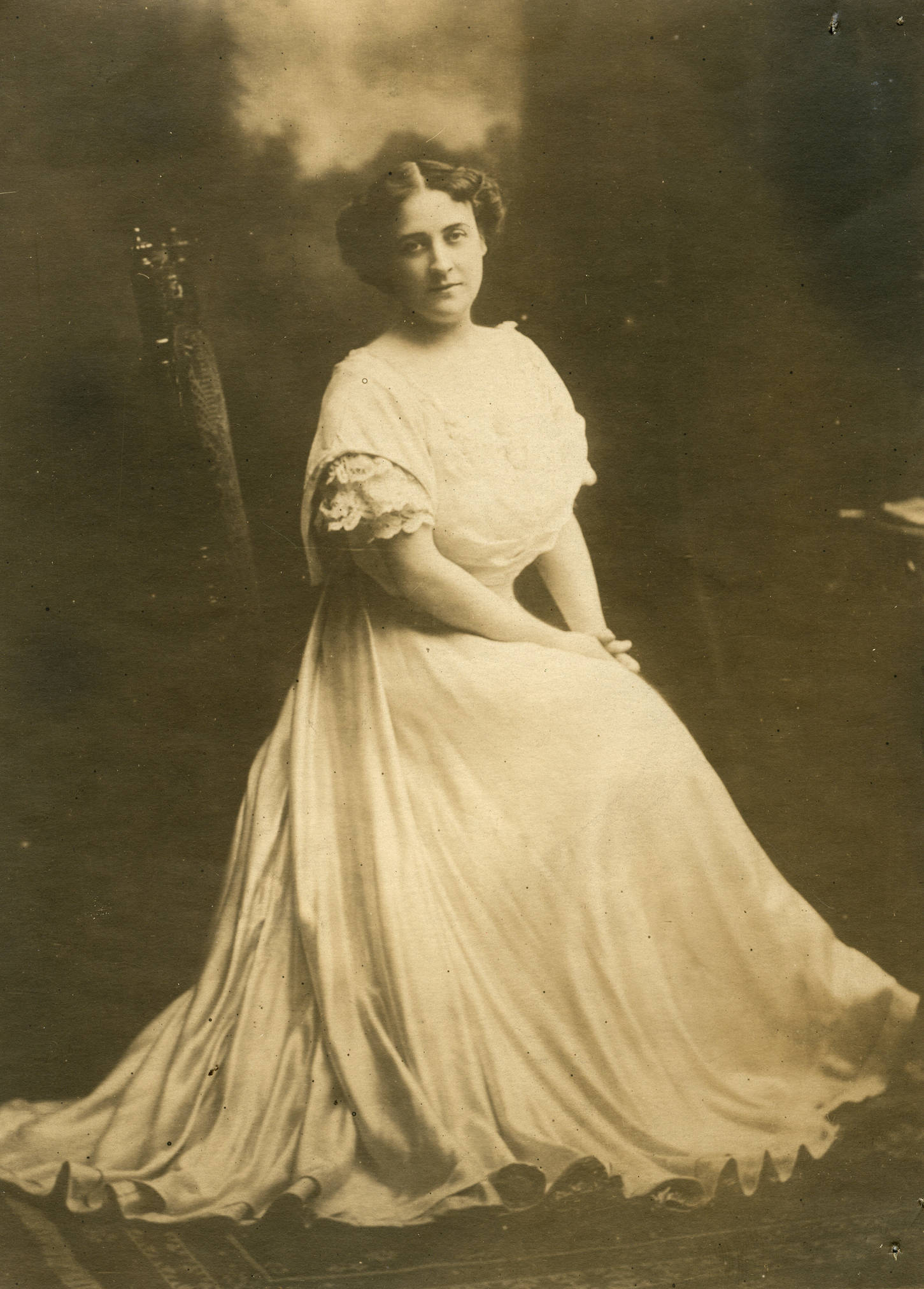
in 1909

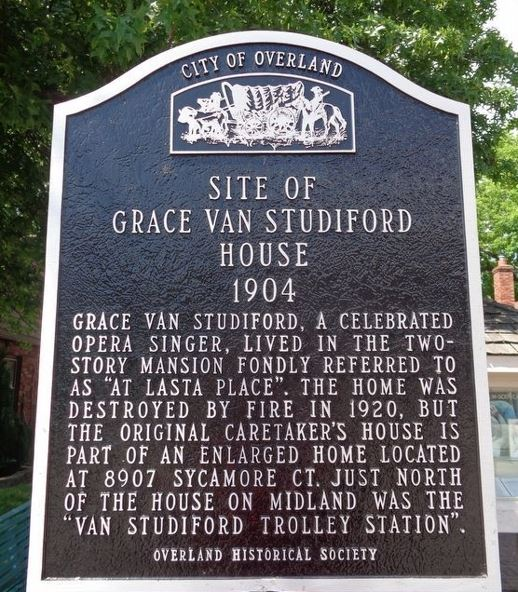

== Grace Van Studdiford Amusement Company ==
In 1908 Van Studdiford and Charles Bradley partnered to form a production company in her name. This was seemingly for the sole purpose of producing the opera she performed in that season The Golden Butterfly. The venture didn't last long as they were sued in 1909 by a Joseph Weber for back wages.

== Personal life ==
She married Charles Van Studdiford in 1897. In 1908 she sued for divorce for desertion. She died at Fort Wayne, Indiana on January 29, 1927, after an operation.

== Filmography ==
- The Land of Promise (1917)
- Something Different (1920)
- The Branded Woman (1920)
- Nobody (1921)
- Pardon My French (1921)
