= With Love and Kisses =

1936 film by Leslie Goodwins

- Directed by: Leslie Goodwins
- Written by: Al Martin; Sherman L. Lowe
- Produced by: Maurice Conn; Coy Poe
- Starring: Pinky Tomlin; Toby Wing; Kane Richmond
- Cinematography: Arthur Reed
- Edited by: Martin G. Cohn
- Music by: Edward J. Kay
- Production company: Conn Pictures
- Distributed by: Ambassador Pictures
- Release date: December 7, 1936
- Running time: 67 minutes
- Country: United States
- Language: English

With Love and Kisses is a 1936 American musical comedy film directed by Leslie Goodwins and starring Pinky Tomlin, Toby Wing and Kane Richmond. It was produced on Poverty Row as a second feature for release by Ambassador Pictures.

The film depicts the troubled life of a songwriter in New York City. He has one of his songs stolen, he struggles to find inspiration for further songs, and he is involved in the life of a female singer.

== Plot ==
Homer 'Spec' Higgins, a songwriter from rural Arkansas heads to New York City to make his fortune. However he is tricked by a radio star Don Gray who steals his song and claims it as his own. Further complications ensue when Higgins is backed by an ex-racketeer to produce more hit songs, but is unable to do so without Minnie, his Jersey cow from back home. He also became entangled with singer Barbara Holbrook and her drunken lawyer brother.

== Cast ==
- Pinky Tomlin as Homer 'Spec' Higgins
- Toby Wing as Barbara Holbrook
- Kane Richmond as Don Gray
- Arthur Housman as Gilbert Holbrook
- Russell Hopton as Flash Henderson
- Jerry Bergen as Himself
- Peters Sisters as Themselves
- Fuzzy Knight as Butch
- G. Pat Collins as Joe
- Olaf Hytten as Dickson

== Bibliography ==
- Langman, Larry. Destination Hollywood: The Influence of Europeans on American Filmmaking. McFarland, 2000.
- Pitts, Michael R. Poverty Row Studios, 1929–1940. McFarland & Company, 2005.
