= Sing While You're Able =

1937 film directed by Marshall Neilan

- Directed by: Marshall Neilan
- Screenplay by: Charles R. Condon; Sherman L. Lowe
- Story by: Stanley Lowenstein
- Produced by: Maurice Conn
- Starring: Pinky Tomlin; Toby Wing; Bert Roach; Sam Wren; Monte Collins; Suzanne Kaaren
- Cinematography: Jack Greenhalgh
- Edited by: Martin G. Cohn
- Production company: Conn Pictures Corporation
- Distributed by: Ambassador Pictures
- Release date: March 20, 1937
- Running time: 66 minutes
- Country: United States
- Language: English

Sing While You're Able is a 1937 American musical film directed by Marshall Neilan and written by Charles R. Condon and Sherman L. Lowe. The film stars Pinky Tomlin, Toby Wing, Bert Roach, Sam Wren, Monte Collins and Suzanne Kaaren. The film was released on March 20, 1937, by Ambassador Pictures.

== Plot ==
Father and daughter find a singing hillbilly in Arkansas, then they bring him to the big city to help with their radio ratings.

== Cast ==
- Pinky Tomlin as Whitey Morgan
- Toby Wing as Joan Williams
- Bert Roach as Val Blodgett
- Sam Wren as Harvey Bennett
- Monte Collins as Adams
- Suzanne Kaaren as Gloria
- Harry C. Bradley as C. William Williams
- Michael Romanoff as Prince Boris
- Fern Emmett as Landlady
- Rita Carlyle as Thelma Manners
- Betty Brian as Jane
- Doris Brian as Dotty
- Gwen Brian as Rita
- Lane Chandler as Simpson
- James Newill as Radio Singer
- Harry Strang as Chatham
- Henry Roquemore as Party Host
- Gladys Gale as Party Hostess
- Martha Tilton as Singing Party Guest
- Elma Pappas as Torch Singer
