= Reno (1939 film) =

American drama by John Farrow

- Directed by: John Farrow
- Screenplay by: John Twist
- Story by: Ellis St. Joseph
- Produced by: Robert Sisk
- Starring: Richard Dix; Anita Louise; Gail Patrick
- Cinematography: J. Roy Hunt
- Edited by: Harry Marker
- Music by: Roy Webb
- Production company: RKO Radio Pictures
- Distributed by: RKO Radio Pictures
- Release date: December 1, 1939
- Running time: 73 minutes
- Country: United States
- Language: English

Reno is a 1939 American drama film directed by John Farrow and starring Richard Dix, Gail Patrick and Anita Louise.

== Plot ==
After a woman gambling in his Reno casino loses money and sues him trying to get it back, Bill Shear suddenly recognizes her as his own daughter, Joanne, someone he has not seen since a long-ago divorce.

Shear remembers what brought him to Nevada in the first place. As a young attorney, then known as William Shayne, he represented silver miners. He met and married Jessie Gibbs and became a father, but when the silver went bust, leaving Reno on the brink of becoming a ghost town, it was he who created a new identity for Reno as a place where unhappily married individuals could get a quick, painless divorce.

Neglecting his own family due to his work, Bill ironically is left alone when Jessie obtains one of those easy divorces, taking their child and leaving him. He is also disbarred and must find another line of work, which is how he came to be in the casino business now. Joanne, moved by her father's story, abandons her lawsuit against him.

== Cast ==
- Richard Dix as William Shayne, aka Bill Shear
- Gail Patrick as Jessie Gibbs
- Anita Louise as Mrs. Joanne Ryder
- Paul Cavanagh as John R. Banton
- Laura Hope Crews as Mrs. Gardner
- Louis Jean Heydt as Judge Jimmy Howard
- Hobart Cavanaugh as Abe Compass
- Charles Halton as Augustus Welch
- Astrid Allwyn as Flora McKenzie
- Joyce Compton as Bonnie Newcomb
- Frank Faylen as J. Hezmer "Hezzy" Briggs
- William Haade as George Fields
- Robert McKenzie as Jury Foreman (uncredited)
- Larry Steers as Lawyer (uncredited)

== Production ==
The film was based on a story by Ellis St Joseph which RKO bought in December 1938. Robert Sisk was assigned to be the producer

By May 1939 John Twist was writing the script and Richard Dix to star. It was Dix's first film under a new long-term contract with RKO, where the actor had some of his greatest successes, notably Cimarron.

John Farrow was assigned to direct in July 1939. Filming started August 1939.

== Reception ==
Frank Nugent, for The New York Times said: "you can't believe that anything so preposterously unmotivated could ever have taken place even in Reno, which is the title of the picture, incidentally. From beginning to end it is compounded of the sheerest twaddle, and the word "sheerest," in this case, may be taken to mean superlatively transparent."
