= Born to Battle (1927 film) =

1927 film

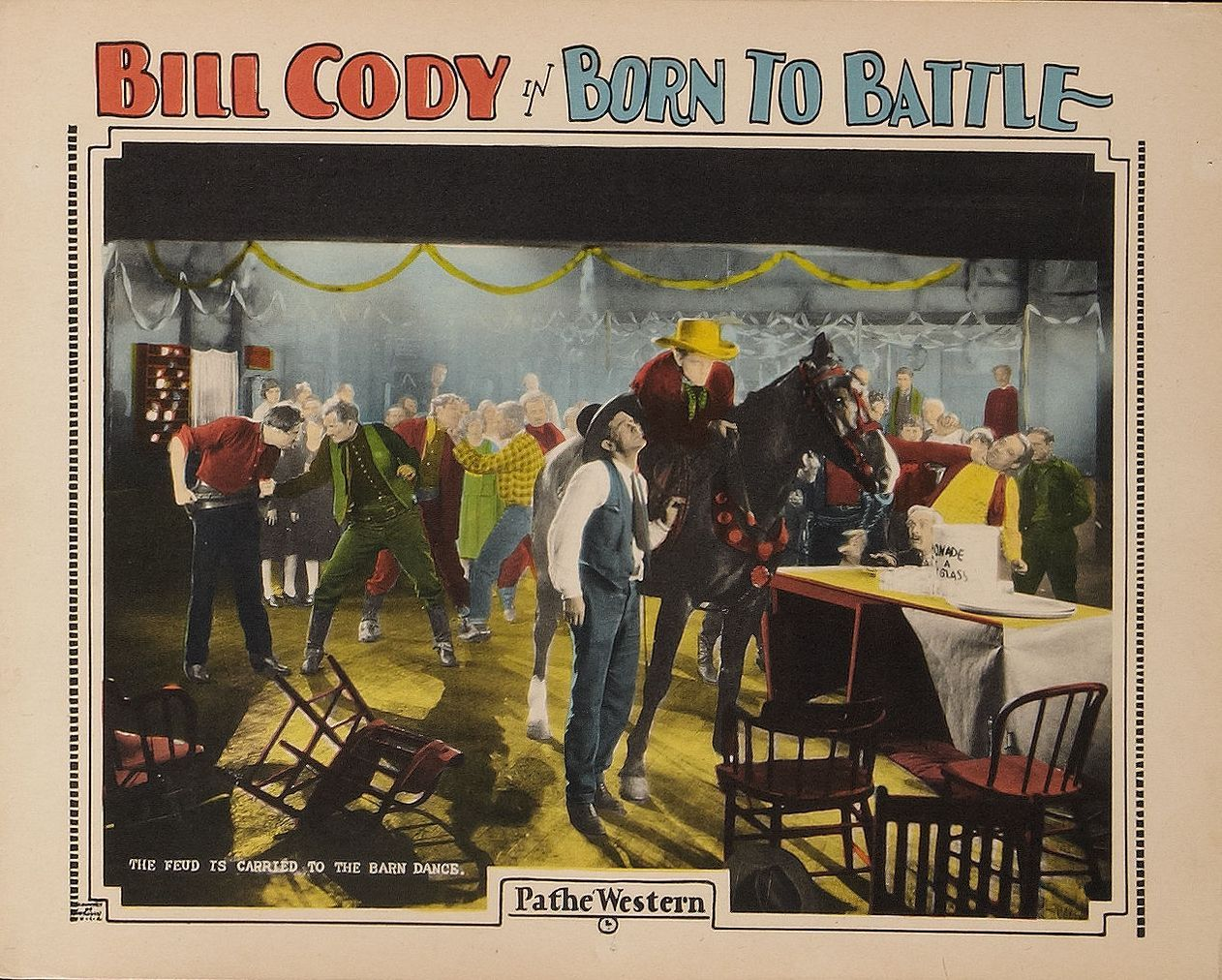
- Directed by: Alan James
- Written by: L.V. Jefferson
- Produced by: Bill Cody
- Starring: Bill Cody; Barbara Luddy; Nora Cecil
- Cinematography: David Smith; Harold Wenstrom
- Production company: Bill Cody Productions
- Distributed by: Pathe Exchange
- Release date: September 11, 1927
- Running time: 50 minutes
- Country: United States
- Languages: Silent; English intertitles

Born to Battle is a 1927 American silent Western film directed by Alan James and starring Bill Cody, Barbara Luddy and Nora Cecil.

== Cast ==
- Bill Cody as Billy Cowan
- Barbara Luddy as Barbara Barstow
- Nora Cecil as Ma Cowan
- J.P. Lockney as Luke Barstow
- Sheldon Lewis as Hank Tolliver
- Olin Francis as Zack Cowan
- Frank McGlynn Jr. as Sim Cowan
- Ralph Yearsley as Jasper Cowan
- Lew Meehan as Joe Leary
- Sailor Sharkey as Bulldog Bangs
- Bob Burns as Sheriff
- Alfred Hewston as Tex
