= Gail Patrick =

American actress and producer (1911–1980)

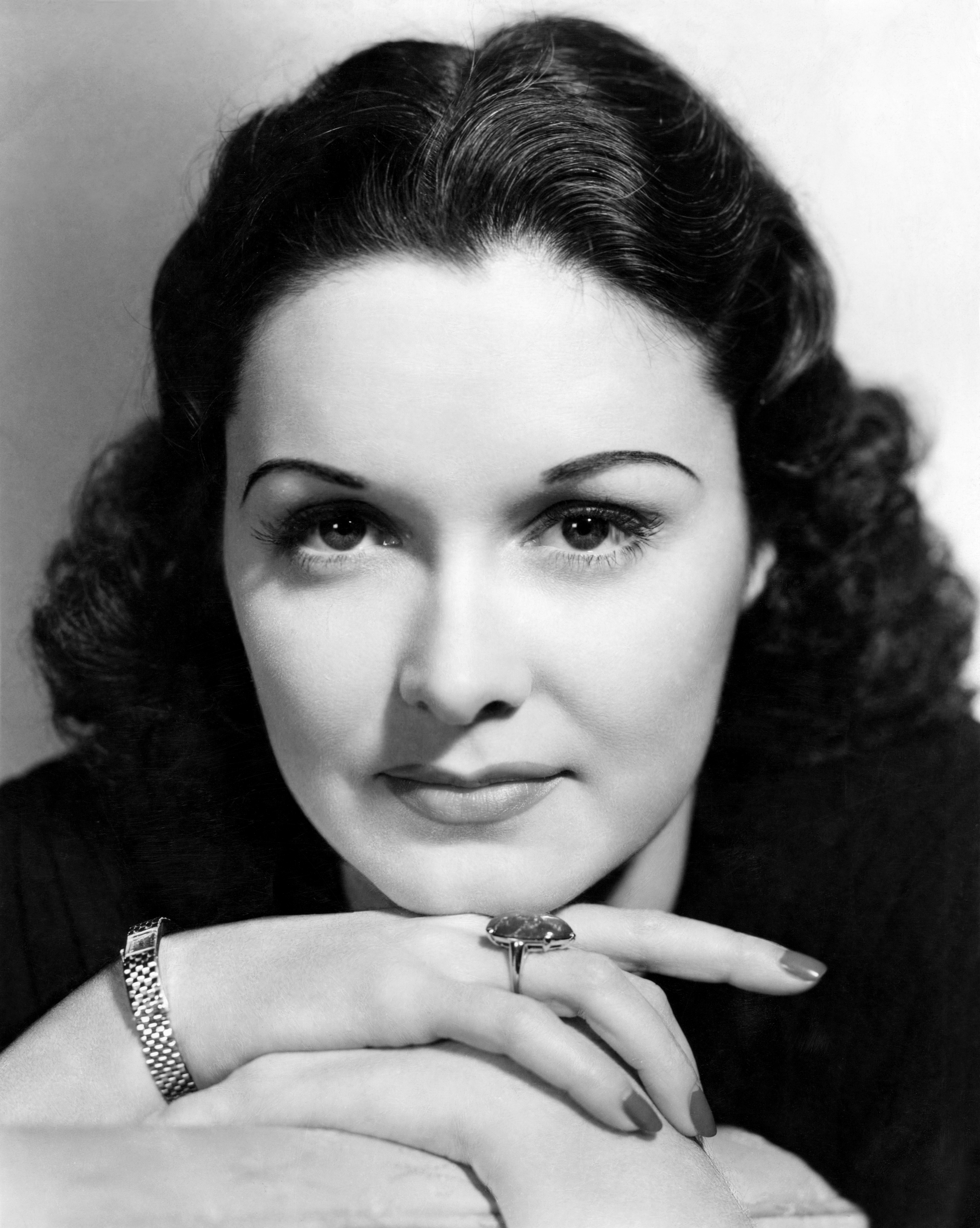
- 1942 studio publicity photograph
- Born: Margaret LaVelle Fitzpatrick; June 20, 1911; Birmingham, Alabama, U.S.
- Died: July 6, 1980 (aged 69); Los Angeles, California, U.S.
- Other names: Gail Patrick Jackson; Gail Patrick Velde
- Education: Howard College
- Occupations: Actress, producer
- Years active: 1932–1973
- Spouses: Robert Howard Cobb (m. 1936; div. 1941) Arnold Dean White (m. 1944; div. 1946) Thomas Cornwell Jackson (m. 1947; div. 1969) John E. Velde Jr. (m. 1974)
- Children: 2

Gail Patrick (born Margaret LaVelle Fitzpatrick; June 20, 1911 – July 6, 1980) was an American film actress and television producer. Often cast as the bad girl or the other woman, she appeared in more than 60 feature films between 1932 and 1948, notably My Man Godfrey (1936), Stage Door (1937), and My Favorite Wife (1940).

After retiring from acting, she became, as Gail Patrick Jackson, president of Paisano Productions and executive producer of the Perry Mason television series (1957–1966). She was one of the first female producers, and the only female executive producer in prime time during the nine years Perry Mason was on the air. She served two terms (1960–1962) as vice president of the National Academy of Television Arts and Sciences and as president of its Hollywood chapter—the first woman to serve in a leadership capacity in the academy, and its only female leader until 1983.

== Career ==
Gail Patrick was born Margaret LaVelle Fitzpatrick on June 20, 1911, in Birmingham, Alabama. After graduating from Howard College, she remained as acting dean of women. She completed two years of law school at the University of Alabama and aspired to be the state's governor. In 1932, "for a lark", she entered a Paramount Pictures beauty and talent contest, and won train fare to Hollywood for herself and her brother. Although she did not win the contest (for "Miss Panther Woman" in Island of Lost Souls starring Charles Laughton and Bela Lugosi, 1932), Patrick was offered a standard contract.

She visited the studio officials by herself and asked to negotiate. She said that she must have $75 a week instead of the customary $50 and that she would not accept the standard 12-week layoff provision. "I also read the fine print and blacked out the clause saying I had to do cheesecake stills", Patrick recalled in a 1979 interview. "In the back of my mind I had this idea I could never go home to practice law if such stills were floating around".

Her physical attractiveness helped her win top billing occasionally, as in King of Alcatraz (1938) and Disbarred (1939), both directed by Robert Florey—but she most often played romantic rivals. She appeared in more than 60 movies between 1932 and 1948. Some of these roles include Carole Lombard's spoiled sister in My Man Godfrey (1936), Ginger Rogers's rival in Stage Door (1937), and Anna May Wong's competitor in Dangerous to Know (1938). Patrick played Cary Grant's second wife in My Favorite Wife (1940), with Irene Dunne, and helped Leo McCarey write the judge's lines in the second courtroom scene. Film scholar Maria DiBattista called her "the underrated Gail Patrick, who excelled in feckless or selfish or simply second-best brunettes".

Patrick attributed her screen success to an accident of timing. When she arrived in Hollywood, the movie studios then wanted hussies, and they felt she looked like one. "I never thought I had much to do with it", Patrick recalled. "Somebody made me up, somebody did my hair, somebody told me what to say and do, and somebody took the picture".

Patrick was so uncomfortable in front of the camera that she made it a point to never see her films. In 1979, she screened a print of My Man Godfrey given to her by a friend, and she watched herself on screen for the first time. "My fright emerged as haughtiness and I can see where I got my image as a snob, a meanie", Patrick said. She said director Gregory La Cava told her she should suck on lemons and beat up little children to prepare for the role of Cornelia Bullock. La Cava borrowed Patrick from Paramount again for his next film, Stage Door. "I was never nastier", she said.

=== Later career ===
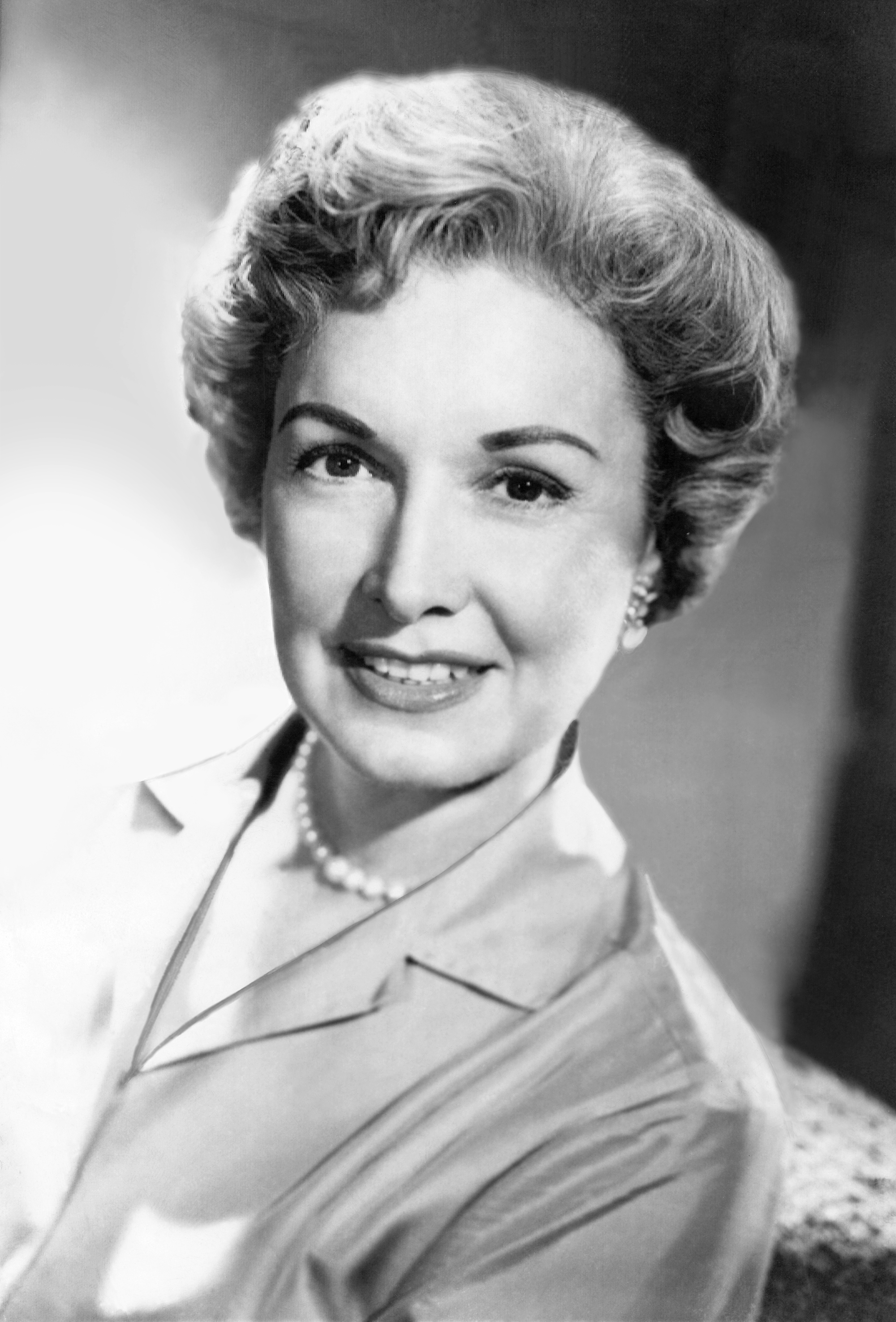
Gail Patrick in 1961

As demand for her type of character waned, Patrick left the screen. "When people ask why I left I explain I did not have the soul of an actress", Patrick said. "Mine had dollar signs on it".

During the summer of 1951, Patrick hosted Home Plate, a postgame interview show at Gilmore Field that immediately followed television broadcasts of the Hollywood Stars home games on KTTV. She and her third husband, Cornwell Jackson, adopted a daughter in 1952, and a son in 1954.

Cornwell Jackson was the literary agent for attorney-author Erle Stanley Gardner, creator of the fictional criminal defense attorney Perry Mason. After a series of disappointing Warner Bros. films and a radio series he despised, Gardner had refused to license the character for any more adaptations, but Patrick won the author's trust. She had maintained her network in show business and shared Gardner's love for the law. Patrick, Jackson, and Gardner formed a production company, Paisano Productions, of which she was president. Patrick developed the television series Perry Mason and sold it to CBS, where it ran for nine seasons (1957–66) and earned the first Silver Gavel Award presented for television drama by the American Bar Association. Gail Patrick Jackson was its executive producer. She was one of the first women producers.

Longtime CBS executive Anne Nelson, who handled contract negotiation and other business affairs for CBS, called Patrick "my adversary in business, but my friend in life". In a 2008 interview, Nelson reported that Patrick was the only female executive producer in prime time during the years Perry Mason was on the air. "Women today won't believe that things were that tough", Nelson said, "but Gail was alone in her bailiwick, and I was the only female executive not in personnel at CBS at the time". Nelson said that years later, Patrick told her she had written up the contract herself, and that it was so wild and favorable to Paisano Productions that she had no idea CBS would accept it. "But we bought it", Nelson said. "And it has been a very big financial success, not only for CBS, but [also] for the Paisano partners over this many years".

Patrick also developed a half-hour Paisano Productions series based on Gardner's Cool and Lam stories. A pilot directed by Jacques Tourneur aired on CBS in 1958, but a series did not materialize.

Patrick served two terms (1960–62) as vice president of the National Academy of Television Arts and Sciences and as president of its Hollywood chapter. She was the first woman to serve in a leadership capacity in the academy, and its only female leader until 1983.

== Personal life ==
Her home, a gated estate of nearly seven acres on La Brea Terrace in Los Angeles, was occasionally a shooting location for Perry Mason, beginning with the third season. The mansion was built in 1911 for Dustin Farnum. Patrick purchased it from the estate of writer-producer Mark Hellinger after his death in December 1947.

=== Marriages and children ===
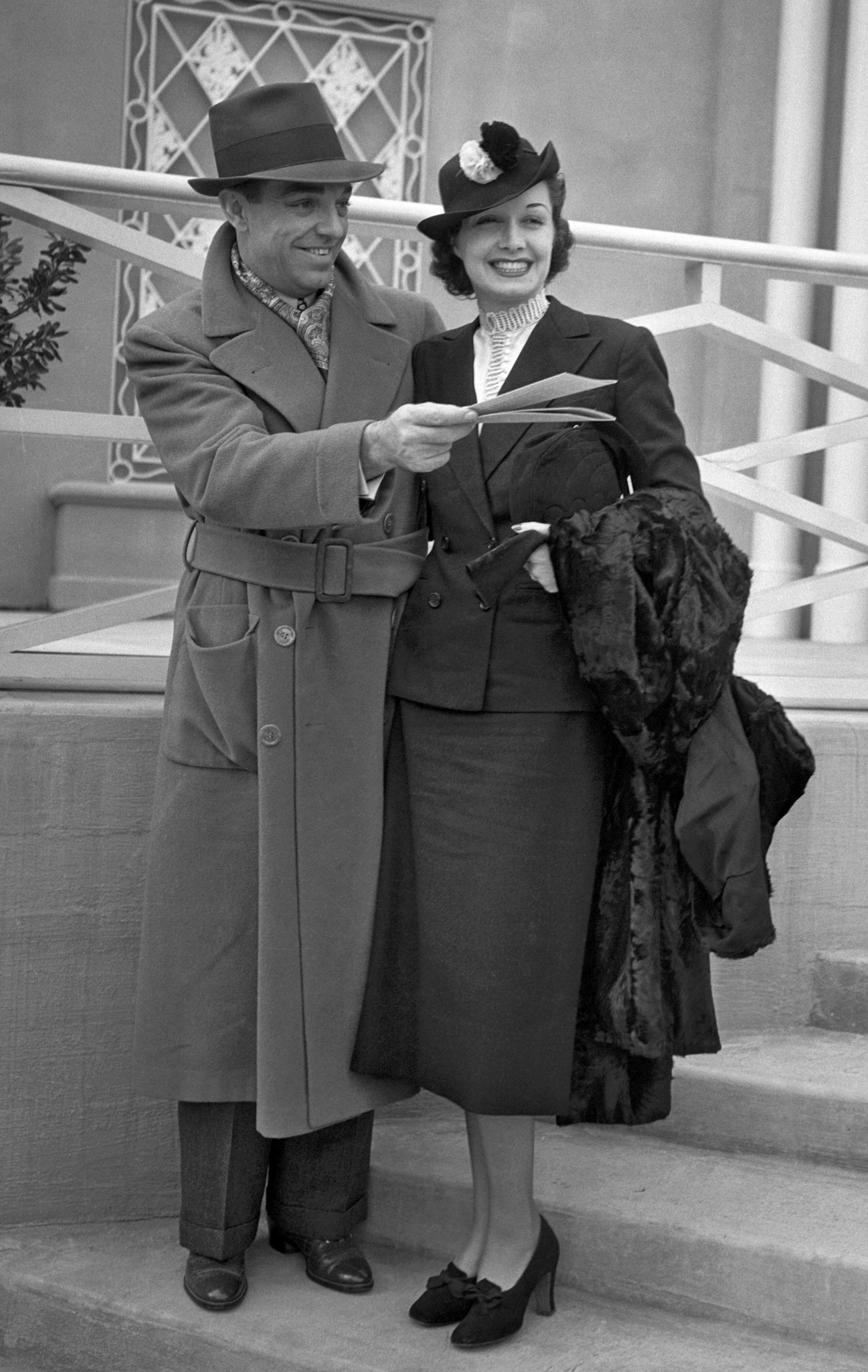
Gail Patrick with her first husband Robert H. Cobb (1937)

On December 17, 1936, Patrick married restaurateur Robert H. Cobb, owner of the Brown Derby and principal owner of the Hollywood Stars baseball team. An ardent baseball fan, she was called "Ma Patrick" and threw out the ceremonial first pitch at the team's new Gilmore Field on May 2, 1939. To Hollywood's surprise, the Cobbs separated in October 1940 and were divorced in November 1941.

Patrick's patriotic service during World War II included four tours of Canada promoting Victory Loans, making her the only film star to visit the entire nation from coast to coast. On her return from a war bond tour, she met Lieutenant Arnold Dean White, a pilot in the U.S. Navy Naval Air Transport Service; they married on July 11, 1944. In June 1945, she gave premature birth to twins who soon died. She became diabetic and had to take insulin the rest of her life. She and White divorced in March 1946.

In July 1947, Patrick married her third husband, Thomas Cornwell Jackson, head of the Los Angeles office of the J. Walter Thompson advertising agency. She created a business designing clothing for children, and moved to a shop on Rodeo Drive that she called the Enchanted Cottage. Patrick ran the shop for eight years with considerable success.

Patrick divorced Jackson in 1969. They remained partners in Paisano Productions, together with Gardner's widow, daughter, and sister-in-law. When Jackson proposed reviving Perry Mason for CBS, the Paisano partners voted with him despite Patrick's opposition. She was given the title of executive consultant for the resulting series, The New Perry Mason (1973–74). A failure with critics and in the Nielsen ratings, the series ran only 15 episodes.

In 1974, she married her fourth husband, John E. Velde, Jr.; they were married until her death.

== Death ==
On July 6, 1980, Patrick died from leukemia at the age of 69 at her Hollywood home. She had been treated for the disease for four years, but kept her illness secret from everyone but her husband.

== Awards, honors, and memorials ==
Patrick was twice named Los Angeles Woman of the Year by the Los Angeles Times, and she received awards from the National Association of Women Lawyers and the City of Hope National Medical Center.

In 1955, Patrick returned to Howard College (now Samford University), her alma mater, for the laying of the cornerstone of its new Edgewood campus. She was presented with a citation for outstanding achievement, "in recognition of achievements in the arts, in service to her fellow man, and devotion to home and family". Samford University presents the Gail Patrick Directing Award in her honor.

In 1960, Patrick received the Mystery Writers of America's Raven Award for her contributions to the mystery genre as executive producer of Perry Mason.

In 1962, Patrick was named the Delta Zeta Woman of the Year. A member of the sorority at Howard College, Patrick was vice president of the first board of directors of the Delta Zeta Foundation. A $1 million bequest from the Gail Patrick Velde Trust established the sorority's Gail Patrick Women of Distinction Program, which provides undergraduate and graduate scholarships and the honorarium awarded to Delta Zeta alumnae designated as woman of the year, the organization's highest honor.

In 1970, Patrick was appointed national honorary chairman of the American Lung Association's Christmas Seals campaign. She accepted the post as "a meaningful way" to pay tribute to her Perry Mason colleagues who died of respiratory disease associated with tobacco smoking: Ray Collins, who died of emphysema; William Talman, who publicly blamed cigarettes for his lung cancer; and William Hopper, who died from pneumonia following a stroke. "I have a personal share in the untimely loss of my co-workers, for they were my friends, too", Patrick said.

In 1973, Patrick became the first national chairman of the American Diabetes Association board of directors. The Gail Patrick Innovation Award is presented by the organization in her honor, to advance research toward the prevention, treatment, and cure of diabetes.

The Gail Patrick Stage is a film soundstage that opened in 2008 at Columbia College Hollywood. Patrick was a member of the film school's board of trustees and funded the facility through her estate.

== Filmography ==
Year	Title	Role	Notes
1932	If I Had a Million	Secretary	Film debut
1933	The Mysterious Rider	Mary Benton Foster	
1933	Pick-Up	Unbilled bit part	
1933	Mama Loves Papa	Unbilled bit part	
1933	Murders in the Zoo	Jerry Evans	
1933	The Phantom Broadcast	Laura Hamilton	
1933	To the Last Man	Ann Hayden Stanley	
1933	Cradle Song	Maria Lucia	
1934	Death Takes a Holiday	Rhoda Fenton	
1934	The Crime of Helen Stanley	Helen Stanley	
1934	Murder at the Vanities	Sadie Evans	
1934	Take the Stand	Cornelia Burbank	
1934	Wagon Wheels	Nancy Wellington	
1934	One Hour Late	Mrs. Eileen Barclay	
1935	Rumba	Patsy	
1935	Mississippi	Elvira Rumford	
1935	Doubting Thomas	Florence McCrickett	
1935	No More Ladies	Theresa German	
1935	Smart Girl	Kay Reynolds	
1935	The Big Broadcast of 1936	Nurse	
1935	Wanderer of the Wasteland	Ruth Virey	
1935	Two-Fisted	Sue Parker	
1935	The Lone Wolf Returns	Marcia Stewart	
1936	Two in the Dark	Irene Lassiter	
1936	The Preview Murder Mystery	Claire Woodward	
1936	Early to Bed	Grace Stanton	
1936	My Man Godfrey	Cornelia Bullock	
1936	Murder with Pictures	Meg Archer	
1936	White Hunter	Helen Varek	
1937	John Meade's Woman	Caroline Haig	
1937	Her Husband Lies	Natalie Thomas	
1937	Artists and Models	Helen Varek	
1937	Stage Door	Linda Shaw	
1938	Mad About Music	Gwen Taylor	
1938	Dangerous to Know	Margaret Van Case	
1938	Wives Under Suspicion	Lucy Stowell	
1938	King of Alcatraz	Dale Borden	
1939	Disbarred	Joan Carroll	
1939	Man of Conquest	Margaret Lea	
1939	Grand Jury Secrets	Agnes Carren	
1939	Reno	Jessie Gibbs	
1939	The Hunchback of Notre Dame	minor role	
1940	The Doctor Takes a Wife	Marilyn Thomas	
1940	My Favorite Wife	Bianca Bates	
1940	Gallant Sons	Clare Pendleton	
1941	Kathleen	Lorraine Bennett	
1941	Love Crazy	Isobel Grayson	
1942	Tales of Manhattan	Ellen	
1942	We Were Dancing	Linda Wayne	
1943	Quiet Please, Murder	Myra Blandy	
1943	Hit Parade of 1943	Toni Jarrett	
1944	Women in Bondage	Margot Bracken	
1944	Up in Mabel's Room	Mabel Essington	
1945	Brewster's Millions	Barbara Drew	
1945	Twice Blessed	Mary Hale	
1946	The Madonna's Secret	Ella Randolph	
1946	Rendezvous with Annie	Dolores Starr	
1946	Claudia and David	Julia Naughton	
1946	Plainsman and the Lady	Cathy Arnesen	
1946	Unusual Occupations	Herself	"Film Tot Fairyland"
1947	Calendar Girl	Olivia Radford	
1947	King of the Wild Horses	Ellen Taggert	
1948	The Inside Story	Audrey O'Connor	
1948	Inner Sanctum	Murdered wife	
1951	Home Plate	Host	Post-game interview show following KTTV broadcasts of Hollywood Stars baseball games at Gilmore Field, with sportswriter Braven Dyer
1957–1966	Perry Mason		TV series, Executive producer
1973–1974	The New Perry Mason		TV series, Executive consultant

== Radio credits ==
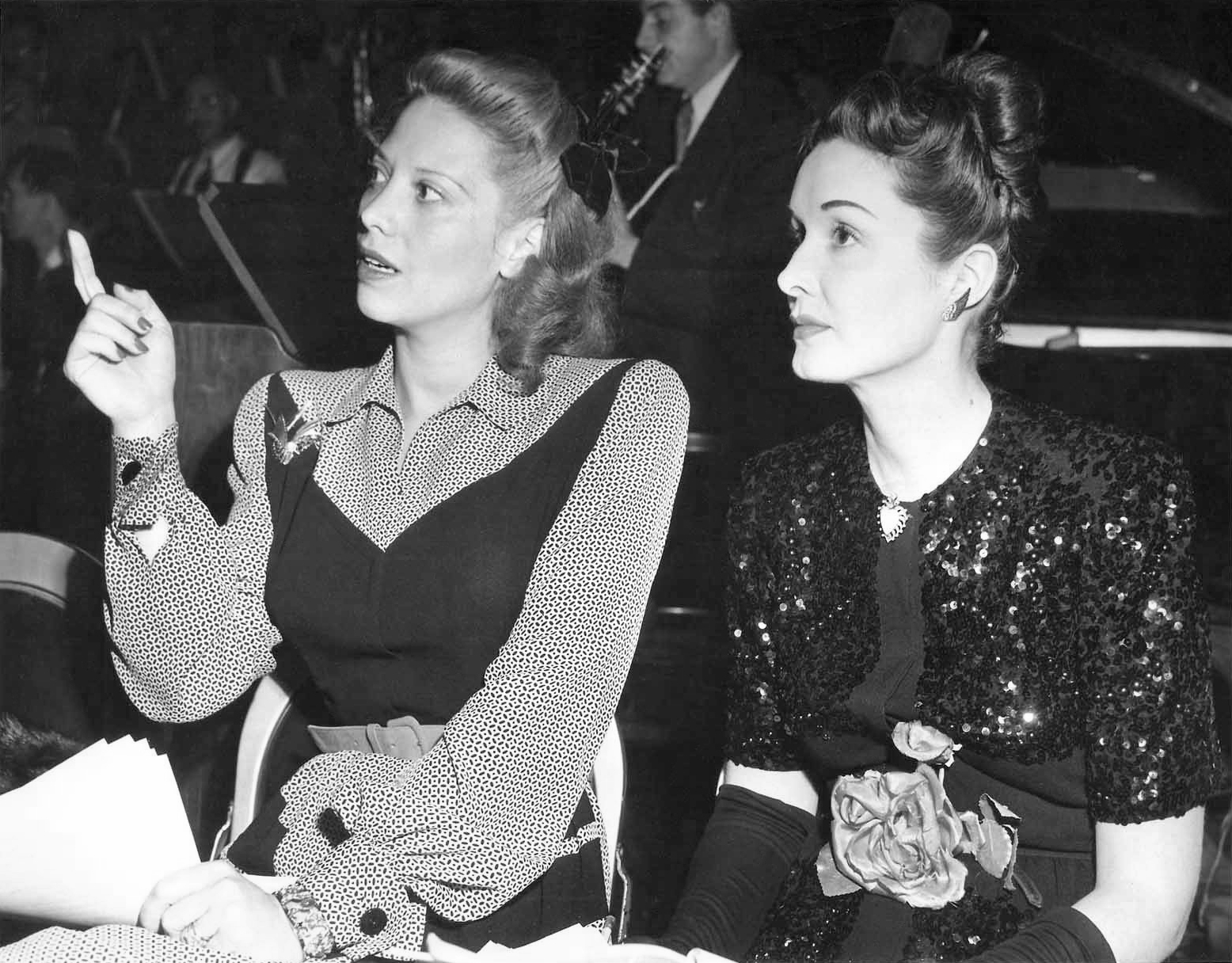
Dinah Shore and Patrick in the CBS Radio studio at a rehearsal for The Screen Guild Theater (1945)

Date	Title	Notes
May 27, 1937	Kraft Music Hall	
August 16, 1937	1937 Shakespeare Festival	"As You Like It"
January 24, 1938	Lux Radio Theatre	"Clarence"
April 18, 1938	Lux Radio Theatre	"Mad About Music"
May 9, 1938	Lux Radio Theatre	"My Man Godfrey"
January 30, 1939	Lux Radio Theatre	"The Arkansas Traveler"
April 24, 1939	Lux Radio Theatre	"Broadway Bill"
January 29, 1940	Lux Radio Theatre	"Intermezzo"
December 9, 1940	Lux Radio Theatre	"My Favorite Wife"
March 9, 1941	The Free Company	"An American Crusader"
April 28, 1941	Lux Radio Theatre	"Wife, Husband and Friend"
June 19, 1941	Kraft Music Hall	
February 23, 1942	Cavalcade of America	"Arrowsmith"
March 23, 1942	Lux Radio Theatre	"The Strawberry Blonde"
April 10, 1942	Lum and Abner	
February 8, 1943	Lux Radio Theatre	"The Maltese Falcon"
November 5, 1943	Stage Door Canteen	
June 1944	The Dreft Star Playhouse	"Marked Woman"
July 29, 1944	Visiting Hours	
February 4, 1945	The Harold Lloyd Comedy Theatre	"My Favorite Wife"
February 12, 1945	The Screen Guild Theater	"Belle of the Yukon"
October 9, 1945	This Is My Best	"The Gilded Pheasant"
November 12, 1945	The Screen Guild Theater	"My Favorite Wife"
November 20, 1945	This Is My Best	"This Is Violet"
December 16, 1946	Lux Radio Theatre	"Killer Cates"
April 24, 1947	Lum and Abner	
June 2, 1947	Lux Radio Theatre	"The Jazz Singer"
1947	Proudly We Hail	
February 23, 1948	Lux Radio Theatre	"T-Men"
