= Search for Beauty =

1934 film by Erle C. Kenton

- Theatrical release poster
- Directed by: Erle C. Kenton
- Screenplay by: Claude Binyon; David Boehm; Frank Butler; Sam Hellman; Maurine Dallas Watkins
- Produced by: E. Lloyd Sheldon
- Starring: Buster Crabbe; Ida Lupino; Robert Armstrong; James Gleason; Toby Wing; Gertrude Michael
- Cinematography: Harry Fischbeck
- Edited by: James Smith
- Music by: John Leipold
- Production company: Paramount Pictures
- Distributed by: Paramount Pictures
- Release date: February 2, 1934
- Running time: 78 minutes
- Country: United States
- Language: English

Search for Beauty is a 1934 American pre-Code dramedy film with some musical athletic sequences in the style of Busby Berkeley. It was directed by Erle C. Kenton and stars Buster Crabbe and Ida Lupino. The film was released shortly before Lupino's 16th birthday.

== Plot ==
Jackson, a swimmer, and Hilton, a diver, are Olympic champions and a romantic couple who become the face of a sleazy health magazine. A pair of ex-cons teams with the magazine's publisher to bring them down.

== Cast ==
- Buster Crabbe as Don Jackson
- Ida Lupino as Barbara Hilton
- Robert Armstrong as Larry Williams
- James Gleason as Dan Healy, the 'publisher'
- Toby Wing as Sally Palmer, Barbara's cousin
- Gertrude Michael as Jean Strange
- Bradley Page as Joe Garrett
- Frank McGlynn, Sr. as Rev. Rankin
- Nora Cecil as Miss Pettigrew
- Virginia Hammond as Mrs. Archibald Henderson-James
- Eddie Gribbon as Adolph Knockler
- James B. 'Pop' Kenton as Caretaker
- Lynn Bari as Beauty Contest Entrant (uncredited)
- Maurice Costello as Health Acres Guest (uncredited)
- Joyzelle Joyner as Beauty Contest Entrant (uncredited)
- Ann Sheridan as Texas Beauty Winner (uncredited)

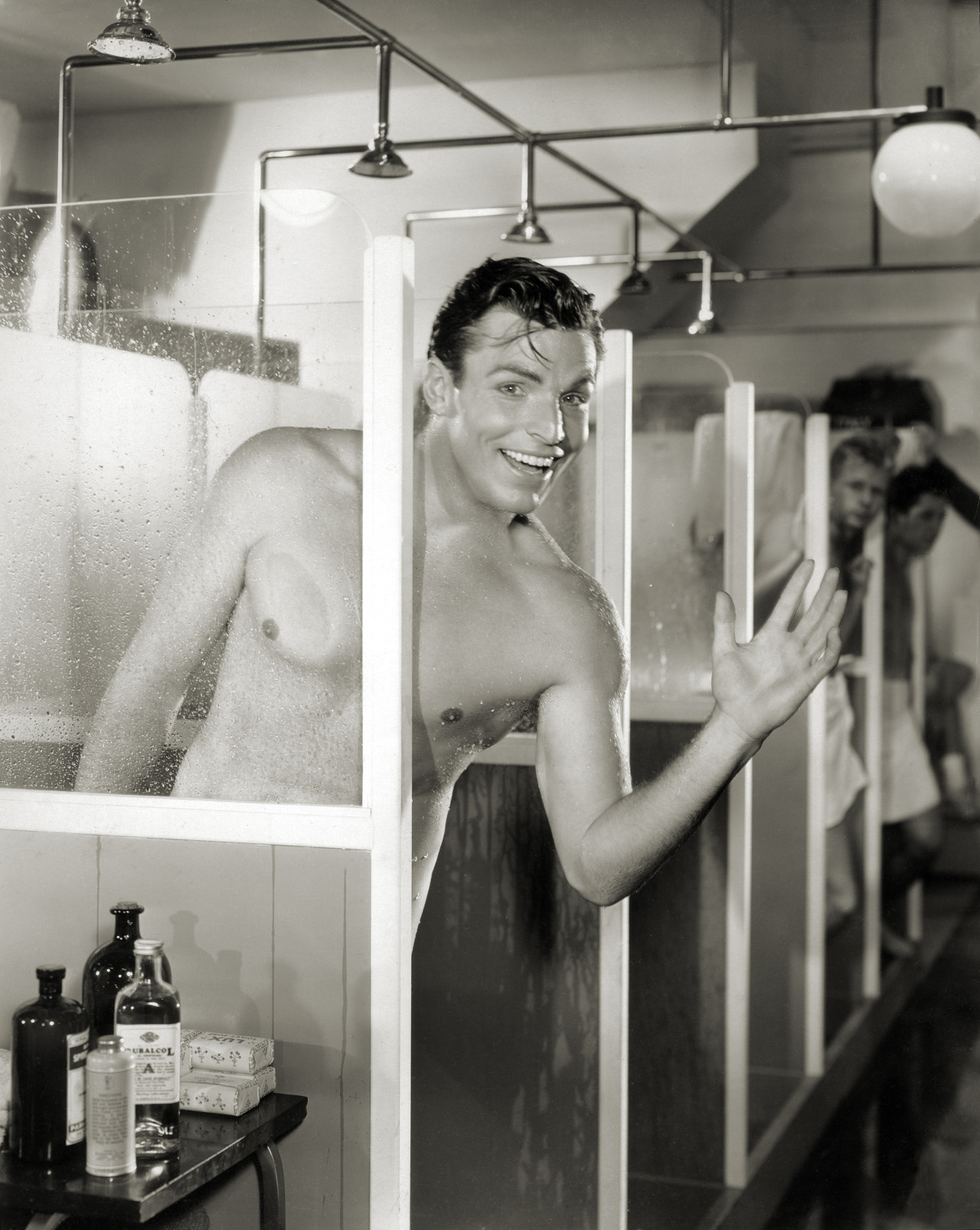
Buster Crabbe in a publicity still for the film.

== Production ==
To promote the film and to find some of the cast, Paramount sponsored a worldwide beauty contest. One of the winners, who made her first appearance in the film, was Ann Sheridan.

Some have considered the magazine publishing company depicted in the film to be a parody of the publishing enterprises owned by Bernarr Macfadden.

== Reception ==
The film was widely panned. New York Times critic Andre Sennwald wrote: "Search for Beauty is the film that Paramount manufactured as the climax of an international exploitation stunt in which thirty young men and women from various parts of the world received a free trip to Hollywood and an opportunity to get into one picture. The result is a tribute to the studio's ingenuity but a less than thrilling tidbit for the man in the street." Variety agreed: "Story is just so much applesauce ... Miss Lupino, to save her kid cousin from the clutches of a roomful of evil-minded stews, does a snakehips atop a table. She didn't learn that in England."

== See also ==
- National Recovery Administration (NRA), the logo displayed at start of film

== Sources ==
- Doherty, Thomas Patrick. Pre-Code Hollywood: Sex, Immorality, and Insurrection in American Cinema 1930-1934. New York: Columbia University Press 1999. ISBN 0-231-11094-4
