= Thanks for Listening (film) =

1937 film directed by Marshall Neilan

- Theatrical release poster
- Directed by: Marshall Neilan
- Screenplay by: Joseph O'Donnell; Stanley Roberts
- Based on: Don't Fall in Love by John B. Clymer
- Produced by: Maurice Conn
- Starring: Pinky Tomlin; Maxine Doyle; Aileen Pringle; Claire Rochelle; Henry Roquemore; Rafael Alcayde; Beryl Wallace
- Cinematography: Jack Greenhalgh
- Edited by: Martin G. Cohn
- Production company: Conn Pictures Corporation
- Distributed by: Ambassador Pictures
- Release date: July 12, 1937
- Running time: 60 minutes
- Country: United States
- Language: English

Thanks for Listening is a 1937 American comedy film directed by Marshall Neilan and written by Joseph O'Donnell and Stanley Roberts. The film stars Pinky Tomlin, Maxine Doyle, Aileen Pringle, Claire Rochelle, Henry Roquemore, Rafael Alcayde and Beryl Wallace. The film was released on July 12, 1937, by Ambassador Pictures.

== Cast ==
- Pinky Tomlin as Homer Tompkins
- Maxine Doyle as Toots
- Aileen Pringle as Lulu Broderick
- Claire Rochelle as Trixie Broderick
- Henry Roquemore as Peter
- Rafael Alcayde as Maurice
- Beryl Wallace as Gloria Bagley
- George Lloyd as Champ
- Gwen Brian as Irene
- Betty Brian as Mary
- Doris Brian as Sally
- Eliot Jones as Gabriel
