= The Marines Come Thru =

- Theatrical release poster
- Directed by: Louis J. Gasnier
- Screenplay by: D.S. Leslie; Jack Kofoed
- Story by: Lawrence Meade
- Produced by: George Hirliman
- Starring: Wallace Ford; Toby Wing; Grant Withers; Sheila Lynch; Michael Doyle; Don Lanning
- Cinematography: J. Burgi Contner
- Edited by: Irving Lerner
- Music by: Edward Craig
- Production company: George A. Hirliman Productions
- Distributed by: Grand National Pictures; Astor Pictures (rerelease)
- Release date: August 5, 1938
- Running time: 60 minutes
- Country: United States
- Language: English

The Marines Come Thru is a 1938 American action film directed by Louis J. Gasnier and written by D.S. Leslie and Jack Kofoed for Grand National Pictures. The film stars Wallace Ford, Toby Wing, Grant Withers, Sheila Lynch, Michael Doyle and Don Lanning. The film was rereleased on July 8, 1943, by Astor Pictures as Fight On, Marines.

== Cast ==
- Wallace Ford as Pvt. 'Singapore' Stebbins
- Toby Wing as Linda Dale
- Grant Withers as Pvt. Jack 'Junior' Murray
- Sheila Lynch as Maisie King
- Michael Doyle as Lt. Steve Landers
- Don Lanning as Dick Weber
- Frank Rasmussen as Beckstrom
- Roy Elkins as Charles
- James Neary as Top Sergeant
- Thomas McKeon as Col. Dale
