= Don't Get Personal (1936 film) =

1936 film by William Nigh

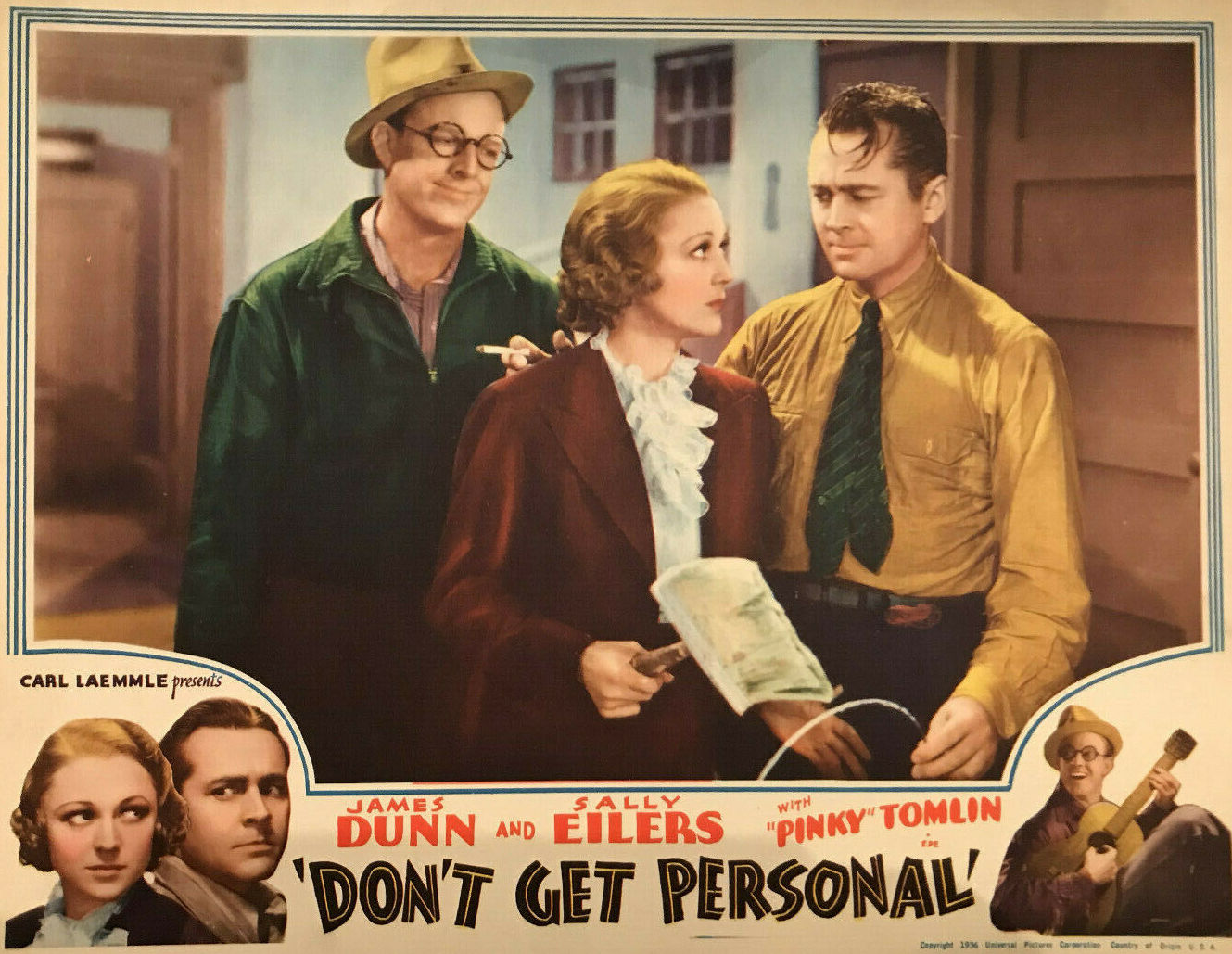
- Lobby card
- Directed by: William Nigh
- Screenplay by: George Waggner; Clarence Marks; Houston Branch
- Story by: Wilhelm Thiele; Edmund L. Hartmann
- Produced by: David Diamond
- Starring: James Dunn; Sally Eilers; Pinky Tomlin; Spencer Charters; Doris Lloyd; George Cleveland
- Cinematography: Norbert Brodine
- Edited by: Murray Seldeen
- Music by: Franz Waxman
- Production company: Universal Pictures
- Distributed by: Universal Pictures
- Release date: February 12, 1936
- Running time: 70 minutes
- Country: United States
- Language: English

Don't Get Personal is a 1936 American comedy film directed by William Nigh and written by George Waggner, Clarence Marks and Houston Branch. The film stars James Dunn, Sally Eilers, Pinky Tomlin, Spencer Charters, Doris Lloyd and George Cleveland. The film was released on February 12, 1936, by Universal Pictures.

== Cast ==
- James Dunn as Bob
- Sally Eilers as Jinxy
- Pinky Tomlin as Arthur
- Spencer Charters as Mr. Van Ranesoleer
- Doris Lloyd as Mrs. Van Ronesoleer
- George Cleveland as Farmer
- Lillian Harmer as Farmer's Wife
- Charles Coleman as The Butler
- George Meeker as Fred
- Jean Rogers as Blondy
- Lucille Lund as Bridesmaid
