= Excuse My French =

Excuse My French may refer to:

- "Excuse my French" or "Pardon my French", a common English-language phrase intended to excuse the speaker's use of profanity
- Excuse My French (1974 TV series), a Canadian sitcom
- Excuse My French (2006 TV series), a British reality series
- Excuse My French (album), an album by rapper French Montana
- Excuse My French (film), a 2014 Egyptian film

== See also ==
- Pardon my French (disambiguation)
