= Mr. Boggs Steps Out =

1938 film by Gordon Wiles

- Directed by: Gordon Wiles
- Written by: Clarence Budington Kelland (story: Face the Facts); Richard English (screenplay)
- Produced by: Ben Pivar (producer)
- Cinematography: John Stumar
- Edited by: Gene Milford; Guy V. Thayer Jr.
- Production company: Zion Myers Productions
- Distributed by: Grand National Pictures
- Release date: February 18, 1938
- Running time: 68 minutes
- Country: United States
- Language: English

Mr. Boggs Steps Out is a 1938 American romantic comedy film directed by Gordon Wiles. The film is based on the Clarence Budington Kelland Saturday Evening Post short story Face the Facts. The working titles of the film were Face the Facts and Mr. Boggs Buys a Barrel.

== Plot ==
Government statistician Oliver Boggs wins a large monetary prize from a cinema for correctly guessing the number of beans in a barrel. His elder business associate advises him to leave his dead end depressing job and do something rewarding. When the pair's boss abuses the elder man, Boggs quits and decides to purchase a barrel manufacturing company in a small town. Boggs discovers that all the business in the town is dead due to the Great Depression. Boggs and his barrel company adviser Oleander Tubbs bring in a variety of unusual methods and ingenuity to bring prosperity to the town.

== Cast ==
- Stuart Erwin as Oliver Boggs
- Helen Chandler as Oleander Tubbs
- Toby Wing as Irene Lee
- Tully Marshall as Morton Ross
- Spencer Charters as Angus Tubbs
- Otis Harlan as Abner Katz
- Walter Byron as Dennis Andrews
- Peter Potter as Bob DeBrette
- Harry Tyler as Sam Mason
- Milburn Stone as Burns
- Nora Cecil as Widow Peddia
- Harrison Greene as Mr. Pry
- Elliot Fisher as Tommy Mason
- Eddie Kane as Theatre Manager
- Wilson Benge as The Butler
- Mike Jeffries as Chauffeur
- Isabel La Mal as Mrs. Mason
- Betty Mack as Miss Feathrewell
- Otto Hoffman as Jenkins
