= Desert Gold (1926 film) =

1926 film

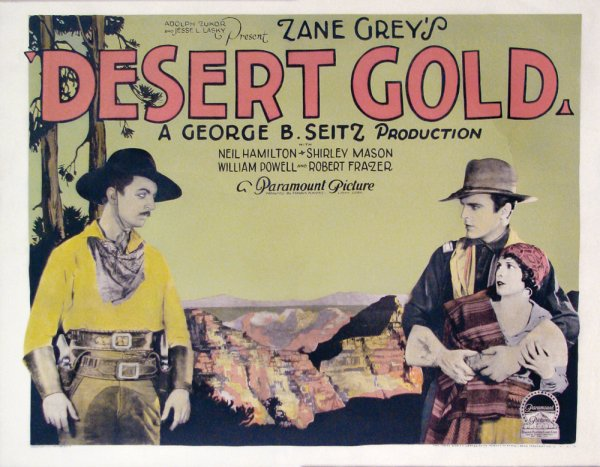
- Film poster
- Directed by: George B. Seitz
- Written by: Zane Grey
- Produced by: Jesse L. Lasky; Adolph Zukor
- Starring: Neil Hamilton
- Cinematography: Charles Edgar Schoenbaum
- Distributed by: Paramount Pictures
- Release date: March 6, 1926
- Running time: 70 minutes
- Country: United States
- Language: Silent (English intertitles)

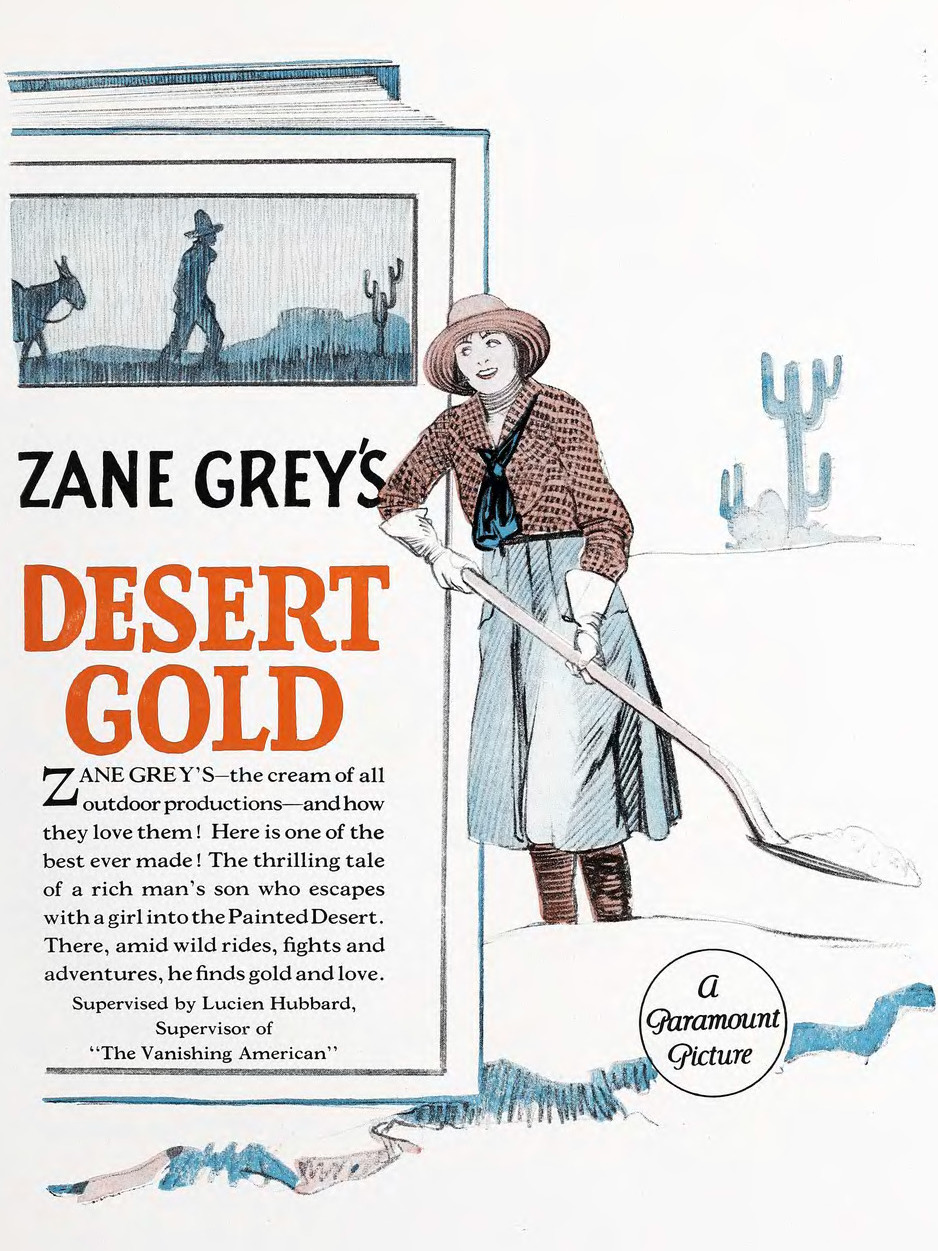
Desert Gold advertisement in 1925

Desert Gold is a 1926 American silent Western film directed by George B. Seitz. According to silentera.com the film survives while Arne Andersen Lost Film Files has it as a lost film. Portions of the film were shot near Palm Springs, California. It is based on the 1913 novel of the same name by Zane Grey.

== Plot ==
As described in a film magazine review, George Thorne is a young army lieutenant at a border post. He is in love with Mercedes Castanada who, in the lawless life about the fort, is always in danger of falling into the hands of Snake Landree's bandit gang that is the terror of the region. Into the life of the post comes Dick Gale, a man from the East who is soon engaged in a battle for the heart of the girl, whom he has quickly come to love. He aids her in a battle with the desperados. They escape onto the desert and are lost in a sandstorm. They are rescued by the lieutenant, whom, the young woman confesses to the other man, she loves. The Easterner accepts his defeat in the struggle for her affections.

== Cast ==
- Neil Hamilton as George Thorne
- Shirley Mason as Mercedes Castanada
- Robert Frazer as Dick Gale
- William Powell as Snake Landree
- Josef Swickard as Sebastian Castaneda
- George Irving as Richard Stanton Gale
- Eddie Gribbon as One-Found Kelley
- Frank Lackteen as Yaqui
- Richard Howard as Sergeant
- Bernard Siegel as Goat Herder
- Aline Goodwin as Alarcon's Wife
- Ralph Yearsley as Halfwit
- George Regas as Verd

== Censorship ==
Before Desert Gold could be exhibited in Kansas, the Kansas Board of Review required the removal of the scene where a man places his lit cigarette on a girl's arm.
