= Forced Landing (1935 film) =

1935 film by Melville W. Brown

- Lobby Card
- Directed by: Melville W. Brown
- Screenplay by: William Scott Darling
- Story by: William Boehnel; M. Helprin
- Produced by: M.H. Hoffman
- Starring: Esther Ralston; Onslow Stevens; Sidney Blackmer; Toby Wing; Edward Nugent; Barbara Pepper
- Cinematography: Harry Neumann
- Edited by: Jack Ogilvie
- Production companies: M. H. Hoffman; Republic Pictures
- Distributed by: Republic Pictures
- Release date: November 2, 1935
- Running time: 66 minutes
- Country: United States
- Language: English

Forced Landing is a 1935 American mystery film directed by Melville W. Brown and written by William Scott Darling. The film stars Esther Ralston, Onslow Stevens, Sidney Blackmer, Toby Wing, Edward Nugent and Barbara Pepper. Forced Landing was released on November 2, 1935, by Republic Pictures.

== Plot ==
Al Talcott (Arthur Aylesworth) is released from prison after serving 15 years for helping to kidnap Jimmy Stafford (Kane Richmond), now an adult and in college. The warden assigns FBI agent Farraday (Onslow Stevens) to follow Al, the only member of the gang to know where the still-missing ransom money is found.

Farraday suspects that Al's old gang, headed by Tony Bernardi (Sidney Blackmer), also after Al. Bernardi calls Al's old girl friend, cabaret singer Ruby Anatole (Esther Ralston), who does not want anything to do with either of them. Ruby's lover, banker Martin Byrd (Willard Robertson), is going on a year-long second honeymoon with his wife and wants to end their affair.

Ruby decides to go to New York and coincidentally gets on the same aircraft as Martin, his wife, Al, Bernardi and Jimmy, who is eloping with his fiancée, Amelie Darrell (Toby Wing). Also aboard the aircraft are Farraday, Ruby's traveling companion, Steven Greer (Bradley Page), elderly Fanny Townsend (Julia Griffith), pilot Jim Redfern (Edward Nugent) and stewardess Nancy Rhodes (Barbara Pepper). During the flight, there is a storm and the aircraft is forced to land on a seldom used airstrip near an abandoned hotel. Everyone disembarks except Al, and when Nancy returns to get him, she discovers that he has been shot.

The group goes to the hotel, which is presided over by caretaker Mr. Jolly, and Farraday searches everyone for guns, confiscating five revolvers, but none had been fired. While looking through Martin's bag, Farraday finds $100,000, which Byrd claims he is transporting to New York for his bank. With everyone considered under arrest, Farraday goes to the airstrip's teletype office to send in his report.

While Farraday is gone, Bernardi steals his gun back and disappears with Martin's bag. Farraday returns and, after sending Redfern in pursuit of Bernardi, goes with Jimmy to the aircraft to retrieve Amelie's luggage.

Jimmy accidentally locks Farraday in the aircraft, and when he finally gets out, Farraday finds the teletype operator, dead outside the hotel. Farraday realizes that the murderer killed the operator to prevent him from passing on the last report received from FBI headquarters. Determining Byrd's gun was the murder weapon, however, during a chase, Byrd kills himself.

Farraday finds the last message received in Byrd's pocket, indicating he was not transporting funds for his bank. Ruby then confesses that the money Byrd was carrying, was the ransom money Al placed into a safe-deposit box in Martin's bank. Ruby told Byrd about the money, but he was attempting to double-cross her by going to Europe without her.

Amelie proclaims that the money belongs to Jimmy, whose family was bankrupted by the kidnapping, and the happy youngsters return to Los Angeles to be married.

== Cast ==
- Esther Ralston as Ruby Anatole
- Onslow Stevens as Farraday
- Sidney Blackmer as Tony Bernardi
- Toby Wing as Amelie Darrell
- Edward Nugent as Jim Redfern
- Barbara Pepper as Nancy "Dusty" Rhodes
- Willard Robertson as Martin Byrd
- Bradley Page as Steven Greer
- Kane Richmond as Jimmy Stafford
- Ralf Harolde as Burns
- Arthur Aylesworth as Al Talcott
- Julia Griffith as Fanny Townsend
- Barbara Bedford as Mrs. Margaret Byrd
- Lionel Belmore as Warden
- George Cleveland as Jolly

== Production ==
Production Dates for Forced Landing took place from September 19 to 27, 1935 at RKO Pathé Studios.

Most of the action took place on the ground but the aircraft in Forced Landing were:

- Douglas DC-2-120 c/n 1307, NC14274
- Stearman C3R
- Aeronca C2 Aviation film historian Stephen Pendo in Aviation in the Cinema (1985) describes the scenes in Forced Landing are historically accurate in showing the airliner operation in flight.

== Reception ==
A review by Sandra Brennan for Allmovie.com stated: "In this high-flying mystery set aboard a cross-country flight to New York, some of the passengers are kidnappers who are trying to locate a hidden cache of loot. Unfortunately, something goes wrong during the trip and the pilots must land the plane in the Arizona desert during a terrible storm. There all of the passengers and crew find cramped accommodations in a lonely farmhouse where murder, mystery and mayhem occur." (Note: The preservation status of Forced Landing notes that nitrate prints survive in the UCLA Film and Television Archives, and none of them are listed for preservation.)
