= Pinky Tomlin =

American singer

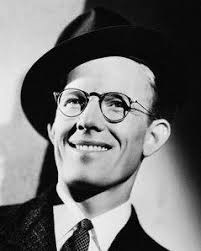
- Tomlin in 1936
- Born: Truman Virgil Tomlin; September 9, 1907; Eros, Arkansas, US
- Died: December 12, 1987 (aged 80); North Hollywood, California, US
- Resting place: Forest Lawn Memorial Park
- Education: University of Oklahoma
- Occupations: Singer, songwriter, Bandleader, actor, Geologist, Oil magnate, Television presenter
- Years active: 1924–1987
- Spouses: Joanne Alcorn (m. 1938–1986; her death)

Truman Virgil "Pinky" Tomlin (September 9, 1907 – December 12, 1987) was an American singer, songwriter, bandleader, and actor of the 1930s and 1940s. In addition to performing in occasional motion pictures, he wrote and published 22 songs, several of which were in the top ten on the "Hit Parade". A song he had written in 1938, "In Ole Oklahoma", was named as Oklahoma's state song by the Oklahoma State Junior Chamber of Commerce.

== Early life and career ==
Born in 1907 in Eros, Arkansas, Tomlin was the youngest of three sons of Louise (née Dobbs) and G. L. Tomlin. Truman grew up in Durant, Oklahoma; and according to the federal census of 1920, his father was a policeman in that city. That same census also documents that his father was a native of Tennessee; his mother, of Arkansas. Sporting a crop of red hair as a boy, he got his nickname "Pinky" because his fair skin sunburned easily. His early fascination with music and talent for playing the banjo soon earned him a widespread reputation as a performer. By age 16, Pinky was hired to play on a riverboat in St. Louis with Louis Armstrong's band. During that time he also learned to play the guitar, an instrument that later became an important part of his live shows, both at the RKO Roxy Theatre in New York and at the Biltmore Bowl in Hollywood.

== "The Object of My Affection" ==
Tomlin came to national attention in the 1930s due to a song he had written while attending the University of Oklahoma, one he composed for a student at the school, Joanne Alcorn, whom he would later marry. When Tomlin auditioned the song for bandleader Jimmie Grier, Grier insisted that Tomlin himself should introduce the song to the public. Tomlin recorded it with Grier in 1934, and it became a number-one hit late that year (Brunswick 7308). It was widely recorded by other orchestras and vocalists, although Tomlin's own vocal rendition became the best known and remained the most popular. The Boswell Sisters had a No. 1 hit with the song in 1935. Ella Fitzgerald, who later became one of Tomlin's lifelong friends, chose to perform "The Object of My Affection" as one of two songs she performed at the age of 17, when she competed in an amateur contest at the Apollo Theater in Harlem in November 1934. The song is largely known to later generations through Carl "Alfalfa" Switzer's purposefully strained rendition in the 1935 comedy short Our Gang Follies of 1936, syndicated to local television stations as part of the Our Gang series from the 1950s to the early 2000s.

== Film ==
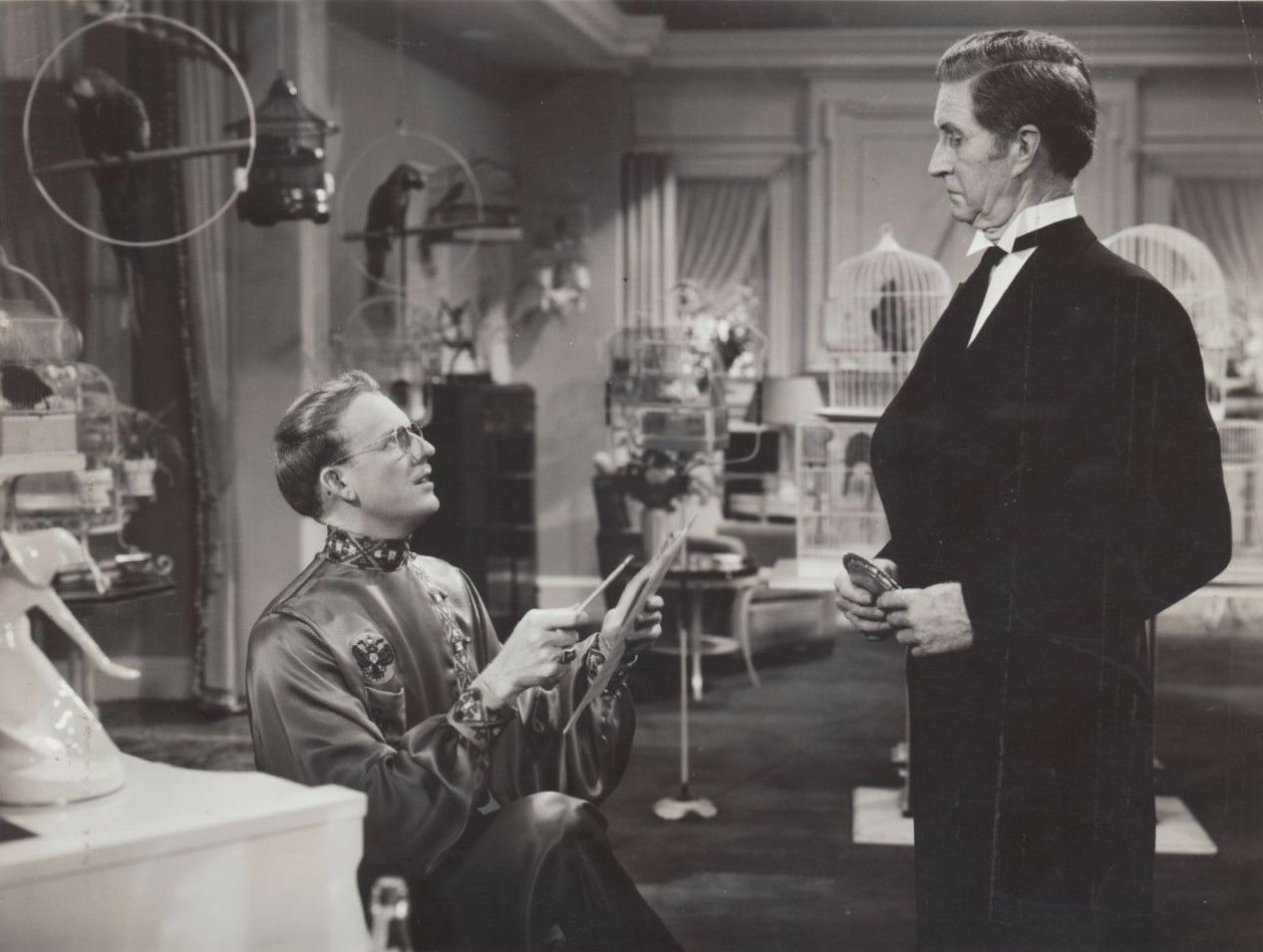
Tomlin (left) and Russell Simpson in Paddy O'Day; Tomlin also wrote a song that he performed in the film.

Following his success of "The Object of My Affection" and a string of other hits, including "What's the Reason (I'm Not Pleasin' You?)", "The Love Bug Will Bite You If You Don't Watch Out", and "If It Wasn't for the Moon", Tomlin accepted offers from Hollywood to expand his career into motion pictures. Various studios eventually cast the popular singer in more than a dozen feature films during the 1930s and early 1940s. In 1935 Metro-Goldwyn-Mayer groomed him to be an actor as well as a singer, casting him in three MGM films released that year: Times Square Lady, Smart Girl, and King Solomon of Broadway. Tomlin, however, preferred to concentrate on his musical career and allowed his MGM contract to lapse. He continued to work in Hollywood through 1938, appearing in such films as Paddy O'Day (1936), Don't Get Personal (1936), and Down in 'Arkansaw' (1938). Independent producer Maurice Conn hired Pinky Tomlin to both star in and score four feature films: With Love and Kisses (1936), Sing While You're Able (1937), Thanks for Listening (1937), and Swing It, Professor (1937). He also appeared in a handful of musical short subjects from 1937 to 1940.

== Radio and band tours ==
In June 1937, Tomlin's guest appearance on Eddie Cantor's Texaco Town radio show led to a regular spot on that program; however, Cantor fired Tomlin upon learning that Texaco's publicity man was trying to recruit Tomlin as his replacement. Tomlin recovered from that professional setback by organizing his own swing band in 1938. For more than two years "Pinky Tomlin and His Orchestra" played in theaters, nightclubs, and school proms across most of America, on a whirlwind schedule prepared by the talent agency. The band was successful, but Tomlin disliked the constant travel, as he was devoted to his family. After the tour, apart from a wartime stint with the USO, he confined his appearances to occasional motion pictures and television shows.

== Later life ==
Largely retired from show business by the mid-1950s, Tomlin pursued his longtime interest in geology, which he had studied as an undergraduate at the University of Oklahoma. That interest soon led to his establishing "Pinky Tomlin Oil Properties", an oil- and gas-drilling company that he headquartered in Beverly Hills. He sold the successful enterprise in 1970, although he remained peripherally involved in the oil and gas businesses until a few years before his death. He also occasionally performed after his retirement at charity events in Los Angeles, being especially active in the Beverly Hills Rotary Club. He appeared periodically as well on television. On February 27, 1958, for example, Tomlin competed as a contestant on an episode of Groucho Marx's televised quiz program You Bet Your Life. He sang on that episode, at Groucho's request, "The Object of My Affection".

In 1963 Pinky Tomlin came out of retirement to re-record several of his old hits in modern, high-fidelity sound. Nelson Riddle led the orchestra on these sessions. The album Country Boy, featuring 12 songs, was issued by Richard Vaughn's Arvee Records in 1963. Ten years later, Tomlin's 1934 recording of "The Object of My Affection" was heard in the hit movie Paper Moon and was featured in the film's accompanying soundtrack album (Paramount PAS 1012 [LP]) The song's title was also used for Tomlin's autobiography, The Object of My Affection, published in 1981.

== Death ==
Hospitalized after a heart attack, Tomlin died at a medical center in North Hollywood, California on December 12, 1987. He was interred at Forest Lawn Memorial Park in Hollywood Hills. His wife Joanne had died the previous year. Married for 48 years, the couple had two children, Tom and Sylvia.

== Partial filmography ==
Guest appearances or character roles:

- Times Square Lady (1935)
- Smart Girl (1935)
- King Solomon of Broadway (1935)
- Paddy O'Day (1936)
- Don't Get Personal (1936)
- Down in 'Arkansaw' (1938)
- Sing Me a Song of Texas (1945)

Starring roles:

- With Love and Kisses (1936)
- Sing While You're Able (1937)
- Thanks for Listening (1937)
- Swing It, Professor (1937)
