= Smart Girl (film) =

1935 film by Aubrey Scotto

- Directed by: Aubrey Scotto
- Written by: Frances Hyland; Wilson Collison
- Produced by: Walter Wanger
- Starring: Ida Lupino; Kent Taylor; Gail Patrick
- Cinematography: John J. Mescall
- Edited by: Tom Persons
- Music by: Heinz Roemheld
- Production company: Walter Wanger Productions
- Distributed by: Paramount Pictures
- Release date: July 26, 1935
- Running time: 69 minutes
- Country: United States
- Language: English
- Budget: $98,823
- Box office: $245,153

Smart Girl is a 1935 American comedy drama film directed by Aubrey Scotto and starring Ida Lupino, Kent Taylor and Gail Patrick. It was produced by Walter Wanger and distributed by Paramount Pictures.

== Cast ==
- Ida Lupino as Pat Reynolds
- Kent Taylor as Nick Graham
- Gail Patrick as Kay Reynolds
- Joseph Cawthorn as Karl Krausemeyer
- Pinky Tomlin as Hans Krausemeyer
- Sidney Blackmer as Harry Courtland
- Greta Meyer as Mrs. Krausemeyer
- Claude King as James Reynolds
- Fern Emmett as Miss Brown
- Otto Hoffman as Wilson
- Theodore von Eltz as Fred Barton
- Charles C. Wilson as Morgan

== Reception ==
The film made a profit of $88,511.
