= Excuses (song) =

Single by MENTIS featuring Kate Wild
- Released: 27 April 2021
- Genre: Deep house
- Length: 2:53
- Label: Sinister Sounds; Columbia
- Songwriter: Andy Manning Katherine Holdaway
- Producer: MENTIS

"Excuses" is a song by British DJ MENTIS featuring vocals from British singer Kate Wild. It was released on 27 April 2021 by Sinister Sounds and Columbia Records. The song entered the UK Singles Chart at number 99 and charted at number 49. It also entered at number 35 and charted at number 18 on the UK Dance Chart.

The song received radio support on Capital Dance BBC Radio 1 and Kiss FM having been shazamed 160,000 and streamed over 50 million streams across all platforms.

DJ MENTIS is an artist alias of music producer and writer Andy Manning who is part of artist duo Nightlapse.

== Music video ==
A music video for "Excuses" was released onto Mentis' YouTube channel on 23 July 2021 at a total length of two minutes and fifty-two seconds long.

== Track listing ==
Excuses - Remixes
No.	Title	Length
1.	"Excuses" (DJ S.K.T Remix)	2:53
2.	"Excuses" (GotSome Remix)	2:53
3.	"Excuses" (J Fado Remix)	2:53
4.	"Excuses" (Krystal Klear Remix)	2:38

== Charts ==
Chart (2021)	Peak position
UK Singles (OCC)	49
UK Dance (OCC)	18
