= Silks and Saddles (1936 film) =

1936 film directed by Robert F. Hill

- Directed by: Robert F. Hill
- Written by: William Buchanan
- Produced by: Sam Katzman
- Starring: Bruce Bennett; Toby Wing; Fuzzy Knight
- Cinematography: William Hyer
- Edited by: Charles Henkel Jr.
- Production company: Victory Pictures
- Distributed by: Victory Pictures
- Release date: December 14, 1936
- Running time: 63 minutes
- Country: United States
- Language: English

Silks and Saddles is a 1936 American sports comedy film directed by Robert F. Hill starring Bruce Bennett, Toby Wing and Fuzzy Knight. It was one of a number of films he made for producer Sam Katzman. It was partly shot at the Pomona Racetrack.

== Cast ==
- Bruce Bennett as Jimmy Shay
- Toby Wing as Marion Braddock / Jane Smith
- Fuzzy Knight as Bottsie Botsworth
- Trixie Friganza as Aunt Agatha Braddock
- Frank Melton as Les Winters
- Robert McClung as T. Midge Connolly
- Bess Flowers as Les Winters' Date
- Roy Thompson as Trainer
- Roger Williams as Henchman
- William Buchanan as Gambler
- Victor Adamson as Horse Handler
