= Pardon my French =

English phrase disguising profanity as words from the French language

"Pardon my French" or "excuse my French" is an English expression that commonly precedes the usage of profanity in a sentence. It is intended to ascribe profane words as a natural component of the French language rather than of the English language, playing on the stereotype of Gallic sophistication, although it can be used ironically.

== Usage ==
One source suggests that the phrase "derives from a literal usage of the exclamation. In the 19th century, when English people used French expressions in conversation they often apologized for it—presumably because many of their listeners (then as now) wouldn't be familiar with the language." The definition cites an example from The Lady's Magazine, 1830:

Bless me, how fat you are grown! – absolutely as round as a ball: – you will soon be as embonpoint (Note: Embonpoint is French for "plumpness"; state of being well-nourished.) (excuse my French) as your poor dear father, the major.

"Excuse my French" appears in an 1895 edition of Harper's Weekly, where an American tourist, when asked about the architecture of Europe, says "Palaces be durned! Excuse my French." The phrase "pardon my French" is recorded in the 1930s and may be a result of English-speaking troops returning from the First World War.

The phrase has been used in broadcast television and family films, where less offensive words are preceded by "pardon my French" to intensify their effect without violating censorship or rating guidelines. An example is in the 1986 movie Ferris Bueller's Day Off; Cameron Frye (Alan Ruck) says, "Pardon my French, but you're an asshole" on a phone call with Edward Rooney (Jeffrey Jones).

== Related expressions ==
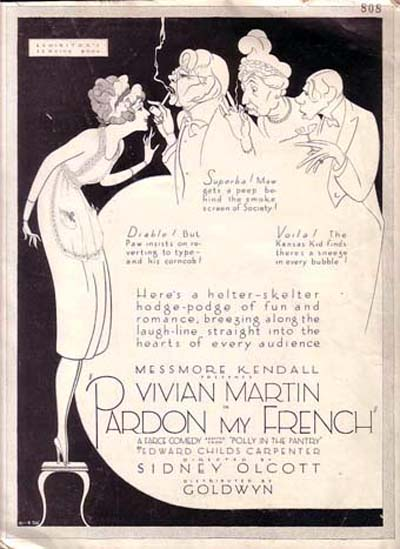
Poster for the 1921 film Pardon My French; the character on the left uses the French profanity "Diable!"

Several euphemisms exist in both English and French to ascribe culturally unacceptable or sensitive matters to another culture.

- "To take a French leave" (to depart a party or other gathering without taking polite leave of one's host) is referenced in French as filer à l'anglaise (lit. "leave English-style").
- "French letter" (now a somewhat archaic reference to a condom) is rendered in French as capote anglaise ("English hood" or "English cap").
- In 16th-century England, genital herpes was called the "French disease" and "French-sick" was a term for syphilis; while in contemporary France, it was called le Mal de Naples (the Neapolitan disease) after the syphilis outbreak in 1494/1495, when French troops were besieging Naples (see history of syphilis).
- "French kiss" (A kiss with tongue-to-tongue interaction is referred to in French as un baiser or une pelle (a colloquialism which literally means "a shovel").

== See also ==
- Influence of French on English
  - List of English words of French origin
  - Glossary of French words and expressions in English
- List of pseudo-French words in English
