= King of Alcatraz =

1938 film by Robert Florey

- Directed by: Robert Florey
- Written by: Irving Reis
- Produced by: William C. Thomas
- Starring: Gail Patrick; Lloyd Nolan; Harry Carey.
- Cinematography: Harry Fischbeck
- Edited by: Eda Warren
- Distributed by: Paramount Pictures
- Release date: September 30, 1938
- Running time: 68 minutes
- Country: United States
- Language: English

King of Alcatraz is a 1938 American drama film directed by Robert Florey and starring Gail Patrick, Lloyd Nolan and Harry Carey. It was the film debut of Robert Preston.

== Plot ==
Just as gangster Steve Murkil is escaping from Alcatraz prison, rival San Francisco radio operators Ray Grayson and Bob MacArthur find themselves assigned to a freighter run by Captain Glennan, headed out to sea.

Among those on board are a new nurse, Dale Borden, and passengers including a young woman and her mother. The younger one is Murkil's moll and the mother is Murkil himself in disguise, making a getaway, with several of his cronies also aboard ship.

Ray and Bob both develop a romantic interest in Dale and both end up in confrontations with Murkil. A fight results in Ray being wounded, with Dale receiving radio instructions on how to perform an operation that he immediately needs. Murkil nearly makes his escape until he is shot by Glennan. On shore, Ray and Dale decide to get married, with Bob their best man.

== Cast ==
- Gail Patrick as Dale Borden
- Lloyd Nolan as Raymond Grayson
- Harry Carey as Captain Glennan
- J. Carrol Naish as Steve Murkil
- Robert Preston as Robert MacArthur
- Anthony Quinn as Lou Gedney
- Dennis Morgan as First Mate Rogers (as Richard Stanley)
- Richard Denning as Harry Vay
- Konstantin Shayne as Murok
- Eddie Marr as Dave Carter
- Emory Parnell as Olaf
- Paul Fix as 'Nails' Miller
- Virginia Vale as Dixie (as Dorothy Howe)
- Monte Blue as Officer
- John Hart as 1st Radio Operator

== Critical reaction ==
New York Times critic Frank Nugent called the film "a trim little melodrama, tightly written and logically contrived." Kate Cameron of the New York Daily News gave the film three of four stars. She praised Florey's direction and Nolan's performance. An Orlando Sentinel reviewer called the film "a conglomeration of the old gangster films with a not quite conscientious triangle added."

== See also ==
- Harry Carey filmography
