= Pardon My French (1921 film) =

1921 film

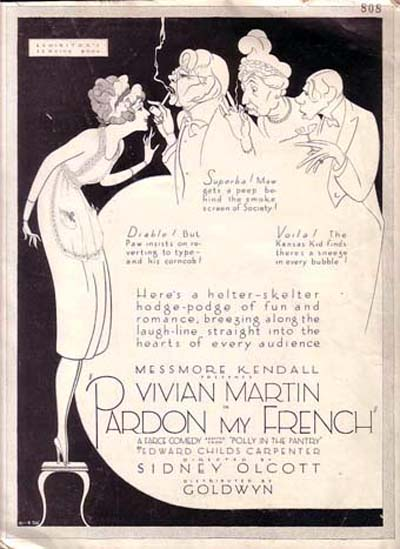
- Directed by: Sidney Olcott
- Written by: Harry O. Hoyt
- Based on: Polly in the Pantry by Edward Childs Carpenter
- Produced by: Messmore Kendall
- Starring: Vivian Martin; Thomas Meegan
- Cinematography: John Stumar
- Distributed by: Goldwyn Pictures
- Release date: September 22, 1921
- Running time: 6 reels
- Country: United States
- Language: Silent (English intertitles)

Pardon My French is a lost 1921 American silent comedy film produced by Messmore Kendall and distributed by Goldwyn Pictures. It was directed by Sidney Olcott with Vivian Martin in the leading role.

== Plot ==
As described in a film magazine, Polly (Martin), an ingenue with a barnstorming acting troupe, works her way back to New York City with the rest of the company on a coal barge. Bunny (Spink), who has always played butler roles, secures a position with the Hawkers, a newly rich Kansas family on Long Island, and when they are in need of a French maid secures the position for Polly. A bogus Count and Countess attempt to win the confidence of the Hawkers, but their son Zeke (Yearsley) prefers the company of Polly to that of Countess Castairs (Studiford). Mrs. Hawker (Beresford) gives a party and Polly is dressed up to act as one of the guests. After she is insulted, she leaves the house. The family jewels are stolen and Polly is arrested. She unwittingly tips off the police to the bogus count and countess and is freed. Having fallen in love with a wealthy ex-actor, Ferdinand Aloysius MacGillicudy, she agrees to become his leading lady for life.

== Cast ==
- Vivian Martin as Polly
- George Spink as Bunny
- Thomas Meegan as J. Hawker
- Nadine Beresford as Mrs. Hawker
- Ralph Yearsley as Zeke Hawker
- Grace Studiford as Countess Castairs
- Walter McEwen as Marquis de Void
- Wallace Ray as Ferdinand Aloysius MacGillicudy
