= The Fountain (1934 film) =

1934 film by John Cromwell

- Theatrical poster
- Directed by: John Cromwell
- Written by: Samuel Hoffenstein; Jane Murfin
- Based on: The Fountain by Charles Morgan
- Produced by: Pandro S. Berman
- Starring: Ann Harding; Jean Hersholt; Brian Aherne; Paul Lukas
- Cinematography: Henry W. Gerrard
- Edited by: William Morgan
- Music by: Max Steiner
- Production company: RKO Radio Pictures
- Distributed by: RKO Radio Pictures
- Release date: August 31, 1934
- Running time: 83 minutes
- Country: United States
- Language: English

The Fountain is a 1934 American romance film starring Ann Harding. It was directed by John Cromwell and distributed by RKO Pictures. It is based on the 1932 novel of the same title by Charles Morgan.

The film is preserved in the Library of Congress collection.

== Plot ==
"A romantic drama concerning an exiled Englishwoman living in Holland during the First World War, who has to tell her wounded German husband that she has fallen in love with an interned British flyer (and childhood friend)."

== Cast ==
- Ann Harding as Julie von Marwitz
- Brian Aherne as Lewis Alison
- Paul Lukas as Rupert von Marwitz
- Jean Hersholt as Baron Van Leyden
- Ralph Forbes as Ballaster
- Violet Kemble Cooper as Baroness Van Leyden
- Sara Haden as Susie
- Richard Abbott as Allard Van Leyden
- Barbara Barondess as Geof's wife
- Rudolph Anders as Geof Van Leyden
- Betty Alden as Allard's wife
- Ian Wolfe as Van Arkel
- Frank Reicher as Doctor
- Douglas Wood as de Greve
- Ferike Boros as Nurse
