= Betty Alden =

American actress (1891–1948)

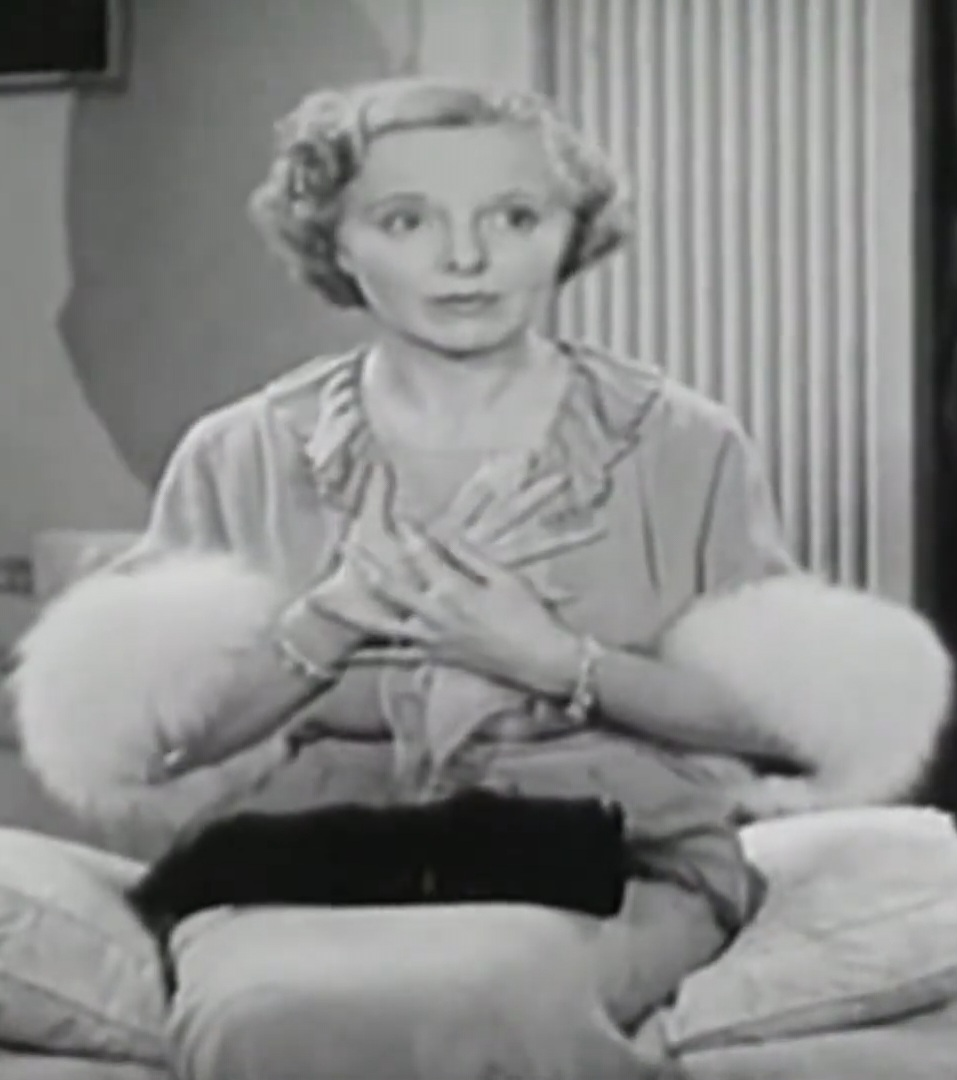
- Alden in The Nut Farm (1935)
- Born: August 21, 1891
- Died: July 4, 1948 (aged 56)
- Resting place: Valhalla Memorial Park Cemetery
- Other names: Mrs. Edwin Maxwell
- Occupation: Actress
- Years active: 1920s–1948
- Spouse: Edwin Maxwell

Betty Alden (August 21, 1891 – July 4, 1948) was an American actress and the wife of actor Edwin Maxwell. She had several theatrical roles in the 1920s.

== Career ==
Alden played Nellie in the 1927 theatrical show The Virgin Man. She portrayed one of the lead characters in the 1935 film The Nut Farm, an adaptation of a successful play starring Wallace Ford, whom she acted opposite in the film.

Alden acted with her husband Edwin Maxwell in the play Life With Father.

== Personal life and death ==
Alden married Irish actor Edwin Maxwell. She died in 1948 and is buried in the Valhalla Memorial Park Cemetery in North Hollywood.

== Filmography ==
- The Seventh Day (1922)
- Lightnin' (1930)
- Fugitive Lady (1934)
- The Fountain (1934) as Allard's wife
- The Nut Farm (1935) as Helen Bent
- Carnival (1935) as nurse
- People Will Talk (1935) as Gertrude Mahoney
- Captains Courageous (1937)
- The Story of Dr. Wassell (1944)
