= The Beast of the City =

1932 film

- Theatrical release poster
- Directed by: Charles Brabin
- Written by: W.R. Burnett (story); John Lee Mahin; Ben Hecht (uncredited)
- Produced by: Hunt Stromberg
- Starring: Walter Huston; Jean Harlow; Wallace Ford; Jean Hersholt
- Cinematography: Norbert Brodine
- Edited by: Anne Bauchens
- Production companies: Cosmopolitan Productions; Metro-Goldwyn-Mayer
- Distributed by: Loew's Inc.
- Release date: February 13, 1932
- Running time: 86 minutes
- Country: United States
- Language: English
- Budget: $230,000 (est)
- Box office: $408,000 (USA) $202,000 (worldwide exc. US)

The Beast of the City is a 1932 American pre-Code gangster film featuring cops as vigilantes and known for its singularly vicious ending. Written by W.R. Burnett, Ben Hecht (uncredited), and John Lee Mahin, and directed by Charles Brabin, the film stars Walter Huston, Jean Harlow, Wallace Ford, Jean Hersholt, and Tully Marshall.

== Plot ==
Police Captain Jim Fitzpatrick is a dedicated family man and crime fighter not averse to using violence to fight violence. Although he's been demoted for political reasons, public outcry forces the mayor to take more aggressive action against sleazy gang boss Sam Belmonte, and Fitzpatrick is promoted to police chief.

His younger brother, Police Detective Ed Fitzpatrick, allows himself to be seduced by a languorously sexy Belmonte gang moll, Daisy, and needs money to continue the relationship. Frustrated when his principled brother will not promote him, he betrays Jim's trust by conspiring with Belmonte's henchmen in a truck hijacking that results in the deaths of a child and another police officer.

After a crooked lawyer is able to get those guilty off on all charges, Ed tells the anguished Jim that he feels guilty and that he wants to go to the newspapers about Belmonte. Jim says he should tell Belmonte that at Belmonte's celebration party, and Jim will bring police in case there is an altercation. Before leaving home, Jim checks his life insurance and bank-account book.

Ed enters the party; Belmonte and guests are insulting Jim, including a mannequin dressed as Jim. He slaps Belmonte, and Jim and police enter. Cholo says he will kill Ed if Jim goes further; Ed defies Cholo, and Cholo shoots him. After the guests flee, a huge gun battle erupts between the police and gangsters; everyone dies, including Daisy, hit by a stray bullet. The dying Jim takes Ed's hand, as a flashback shows Jim reciting his oath as police chief to uphold the law.

== Cast ==
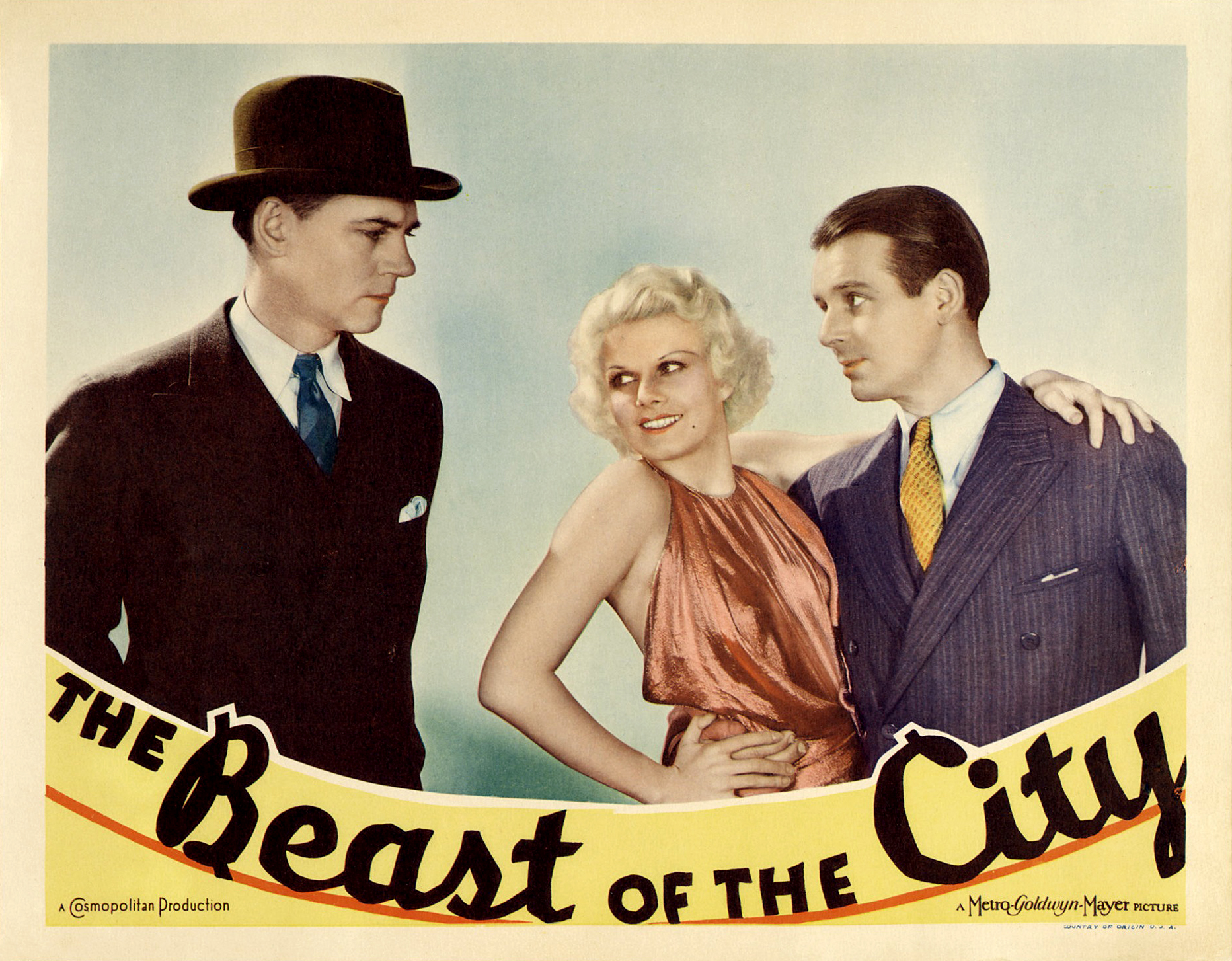
Lobby card for The Beast of the City featuring Walter Huston, Jean Harlow and Wallace Ford

- Walter Huston as Captain Jim Fitzpatrick
- Jean Harlow as Daisy Stevens/Mildred Beaumont
- Wallace Ford as Detective Ed Fitzpatrick
- Jean Hersholt as Samuel "Sam" Belmonte
- Dorothy Peterson as Mary Fitzpatrick
- Tully Marshall as Defense Attorney Michaels
- John Miljan as District Attorney
- Emmett Corrigan as Police Chief "Burt" Burton
- Warner Richmond as Police Lieutenant Tom
- J. Carrol Naish as Pietro Cholo
- George Chandler as Reporter
- Robert Homans as Policeman (uncredited)
- Ethan Laidlaw as Nightclub Patron (uncredited)
- Tom London as Policeman (uncredited)
- Morgan Wallace as Police Captain (uncredited)
- Leo White as Arrested Man (uncredited)
- Julie Haydon as Blonde in Police Lineup (uncredited)
- Edward Brophy as Police Dispatcher (uncredited)
- Nat Pendleton as Abe Gorman (uncredited)

Mickey Rooney, in an uncredited appearance in his first MGM feature, played the son of Captain Jim Fitzpatrick (Walter Huston).

== Production ==
The Beast of the City originated in consultations between MGM head of production Louis B. Mayer and President Herbert Hoover, who was concerned that the public needed to have greater respect for police officers and other law-enforcement officials. The film opens with this text: "Instead of the glorification of cowardly gangsters, we need the glorification of policemen who do their duty and give their lives in public protection. If the police had the vigilant, universal backing of public opinion in their communities, if they had the implacable support of the prosecuting authorities and the courts—I am convinced that our police would stamp out the excessive crime—which has disgraced some of our great cities”— President Herbert Hoover.” The film was produced under the working title "City Sentinels"; principal photography took place from November 4 to December 1931 at MGM's studios in Culver City.

After the film was completed, Mayer decided that it was not quite right for MGM's image as the home of family entertainment, because it was too violent, despite its focus on law-and-order. Mayer ordered that it be exhibited as the bottom feature on double bills. The film was Jean Harlow's opportunity to show MGM that she would cooperate with the studio, and she was rewarded with better roles which would shortly lead to stardom.

W.R. Burnett called it "one of the best crime pictures of all. Hersholt was a greasy, offensive Capone. Really good." He felt it was well directed although Charles Brabin was English. "Everything about it was wrong. Making an American hoodlum picture, giving it to an Englishman. We’d have a story conference, and he’d go to sleep right in your face."

== See also ==
- List of American films of 1932
