= The Rogues' Tavern =

1936 film by Robert F. Hill

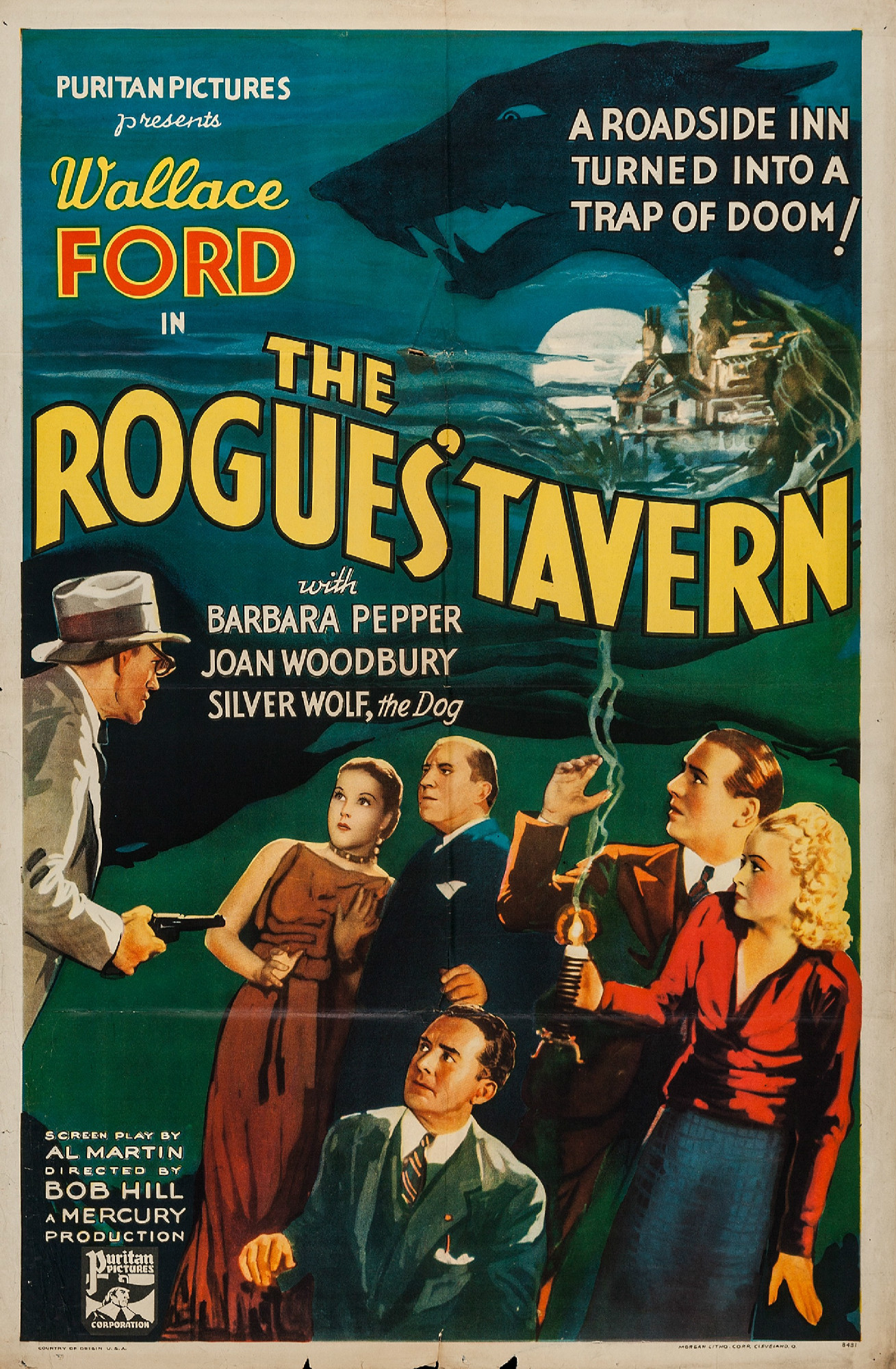
- Directed by: Robert F. Hill
- Written by: Al Martin (original screenplay)
- Produced by: Sam Katzman
- Starring: Wallace Ford; Barbara Pepper; Joan Woodbury
- Cinematography: William Hyer
- Edited by: Dan Milner
- Production company: Mercury Pictures Corporation
- Distributed by: Puritan Pictures Corporation; Pathé Pictures Lid.
- Release date: June 4, 1936
- Running time: 70 minutes (Australia, uncut version); 70 minutes (U.S.)
- Country: United States
- Language: English

The Rogues' Tavern is a 1936 American murder mystery film directed by Robert F. Hill and starring Wallace Ford, Barbara Pepper, and Joan Woodbury. The film was produced by Mercury Pictures, and released by Puritan Picture on June 4, 1936.

== Plot ==
It is a bleak and windy night when Jimmy Kelly (Wallace Ford) and Marjorie Burns (Barbara Pepper) arrive at the Red Rock Tavern with plans to marry as soon as possible, but are told there are no rooms available. Mrs. Jamison (Clara Kimball Young) agrees to let them stay until the justice of the peace gets there, as they've arranged to meet him there.

Everyone in the tavern is shocked when Harrison is killed, apparently by a wild dog that breaks in and attacks him. Mason appears to call the coroner and asks for him to get there as soon as possible. Because of the weather and the late hour, Mrs. Jamison agrees to let Jimmy and Marjorie stay the night, Jimmy in Bill's room, and Marjorie in Joan's room. A little while later Hughes is killed in the same manner, seemingly by a wild dog. Jimmy attempts to call the coroner but the phone is not working, and upon closer inspection discovers the line has been cut, which leads him to suspect a dog is not the real killer.

Wentworth arrives at the tavern, he says that he left as soon as he received Mason's telegram. Mason is surprised, as he, Harrison, Hughes and Joan all got telegrams that say they are from Wentworth. Suddenly the lights go out, and Jamison says a fuse must have burned out. Jimmy searches outside and finds the dog that is supposedly responsible for the killings and puts a makeshift leash on him and takes him inside. Mason goes to search Hughes' room for a gun and is killed in the process, which rules out the dog as the killer. The lights then come back on again. Marjorie searches the guests luggage with Mrs. Jamison's help.

Jimmy begins to question the remaining guests to determine who might have motive, then a fist fight breaks out among them and Jimmy is knocked unconscious. Bill, Joan and Wentworth panic and try to leave the tavern but suddenly find themselves trapped inside by locked doors and barred windows. As Jimmy is regaining consciousness, Bill Joan and Wentworth turn to Jimmy for help, since he is a detective. Jimmy then tries to determine what reason someone would have to try to kill any of them and they admit to being jewel smugglers. Marjorie, who is still searching through the luggage, discovers jewels in Joan's suitcase.

Marjorie then searches Jamison's room and finds a dog's head, Jimmy accuses the wheel chair bound Jamison of being the real killer and he confesses. Meanwhile a man who has been lurking outside hides in the basement. Jimmy suspects Jamison confessed to cover up the real killer.

== Cast ==
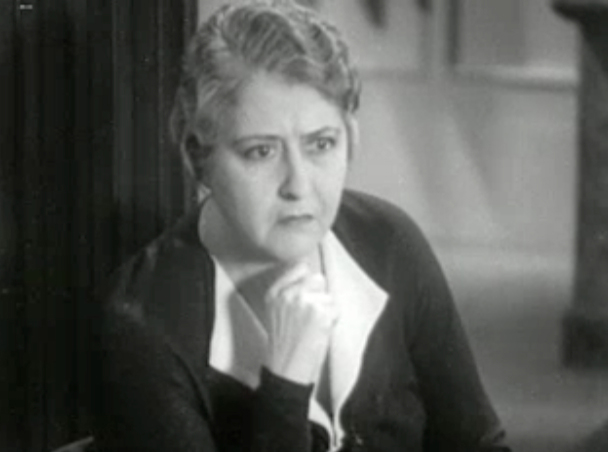
Clara Kimball Young in Rogue's Tavern

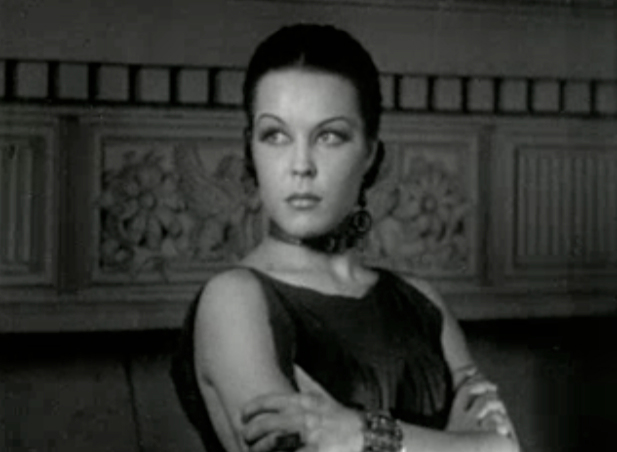
Joan Woodbury in Rogue's Tavern

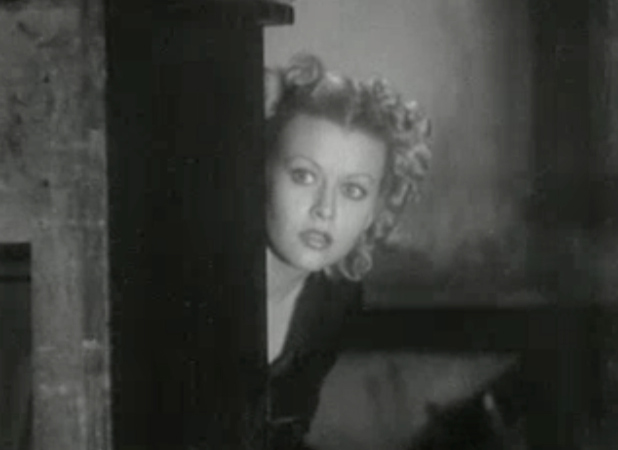
Barbara Pepper in Rogue's Tavern

- Wallace Ford as Jimmy Kelly
- Barbara Pepper as Marjorie Burns
- Joan Woodbury as Gloria Robloff
- Clara Kimball Young as Mrs. Jamison
- Jack Mulhall as Bill
- John Elliott as Mr. Jamison
- Earl Dwire as Morgan
- John Cowell as Hughes
- Arthur Loft as Wentworth
- Ivo Henderson as Harrison
- Ed Cassidy as Mason
- Silver Wolf as Silver Wolf

The Rogues' Tavern
