= The Sagebrush Troubadour =

1935 film by Joseph Kane

- Lobby card
- Directed by: Joseph Kane
- Screenplay by: Oliver Drake; Joseph F. Poland
- Story by: Oliver Drake
- Produced by: Nat Levine (uncredited)
- Starring: Gene Autry; Barbara Pepper; Smiley Burnette
- Cinematography: Ernest Miller; Jack A. Marta
- Edited by: Lester Orlebeck
- Production company: Republic Pictures
- Distributed by: Republic Pictures
- Release date: December 2, 1935 (U.S.)
- Running time: 58 minutes
- Country: United States
- Language: English

The Sagebrush Troubadour is a 1935 American Western film directed by Joseph Kane and starring Gene Autry, Barbara Pepper, and Smiley Burnette. Written by Oliver Drake and Joseph F. Poland, the film is about two Texas Rangers traveling undercover as western troubadours in search of the killer of an old, half-blind man.

== Plot ==
Texas Rangers Gene Autry (Gene Autry) and Frog Millhouse (Smiley Burnette) are traveling undercover as western troubadours in search of the killer of old, half-blind Frank Martin. Their only clues are a guitar string (the murder weapon) and Martin's horse Swayback that hold the key to finding the dead man's lost goldmine.

Following Frank Martin's funeral, Martin's granddaughter, Joan (Barbara Pepper), meets her uncle, John Martin, and Lon Dillon, who flirts with her. Lawyer Henry Nolan reads Martin's will, revealing that the deceased left John $5,000 and the remainder of the estate to Joan. John tells Joan that he suspects Gene of her grandfather's murder and persuades her to hold a masquerade dance to lure Gene into town.

Meanwhile, Gene learns that Martin was nearly blind and relied on his horse Swayback to guide him. By following Swayback, whom Lon, John, and Henry have all tried to buy, Gene discovers that Martin had indeed located a gold mine. Gene and Frog escape a trap set for them at the dance and save Joan when she is nearly strangled by another guitar string. Then Gene discovers that John's guitar is missing a string.

John and Pablo, who have uncovered Swayback's hiding place, find the mine and are followed by Henry, Lon, and Hank Polk. As they argue among themselves, Gene surprises them and reveals that he is a Texas Ranger assigned to the Martin murder case. By claiming that Frog is a fingerprint expert, Gene tricks Henry into admitting his guilt. Henry is then arrested by the sheriff, who is waiting in the mine according to Gene's instructions. Finally, Joan learns that Gene has recorded the deed to the mine in her name.

== Cast ==
- Gene Autry as Gene Autry
- Barbara Pepper as Joan Martin
- Smiley Burnette as Frog Millhouse
- Fred Kelsey as Hank Polk
- J. Frank Glendon as John Martin
- Hooper Atchley as Henry Nolan
- Julian Rivero as Pablo
- Dennis Moore as Lon Dillon (as Denny Meadows)

== Production ==
=== Filming locations ===
- Kernville, California, USA

=== Soundtrack ===
- "Way Out West in Texas" (Gene Autry) by Gene Autry and Smiley Burnette
- "On the Prairie" (Smiley Burnette) by Gene Autry
- "End of the Trail" (Gene Autry) by Gene Autry and Smiley Burnette
- "Hurdy Gurdy Man" (Smiley Burnette) by Tommy Gene Fairey
- "My Prayer for Tonight" (Smiley Burnette) by the party guests
- "Lookin' for the Lost Chord" (Smiley Burnette) by Smiley Burnette
- "I'd Love a Home in the Mountains" (Gene Autry, Smiley Burnette) by Gene Autry and Smiley Burnette
- "When the Moon Shines (on the Mississippi Valley)" (Gene Autry, Smiley Burnette) (instrumental)
- "Someday in Wyoming" (instrumental)
