= Murder by Invitation =

1941 film by Phil Rosen

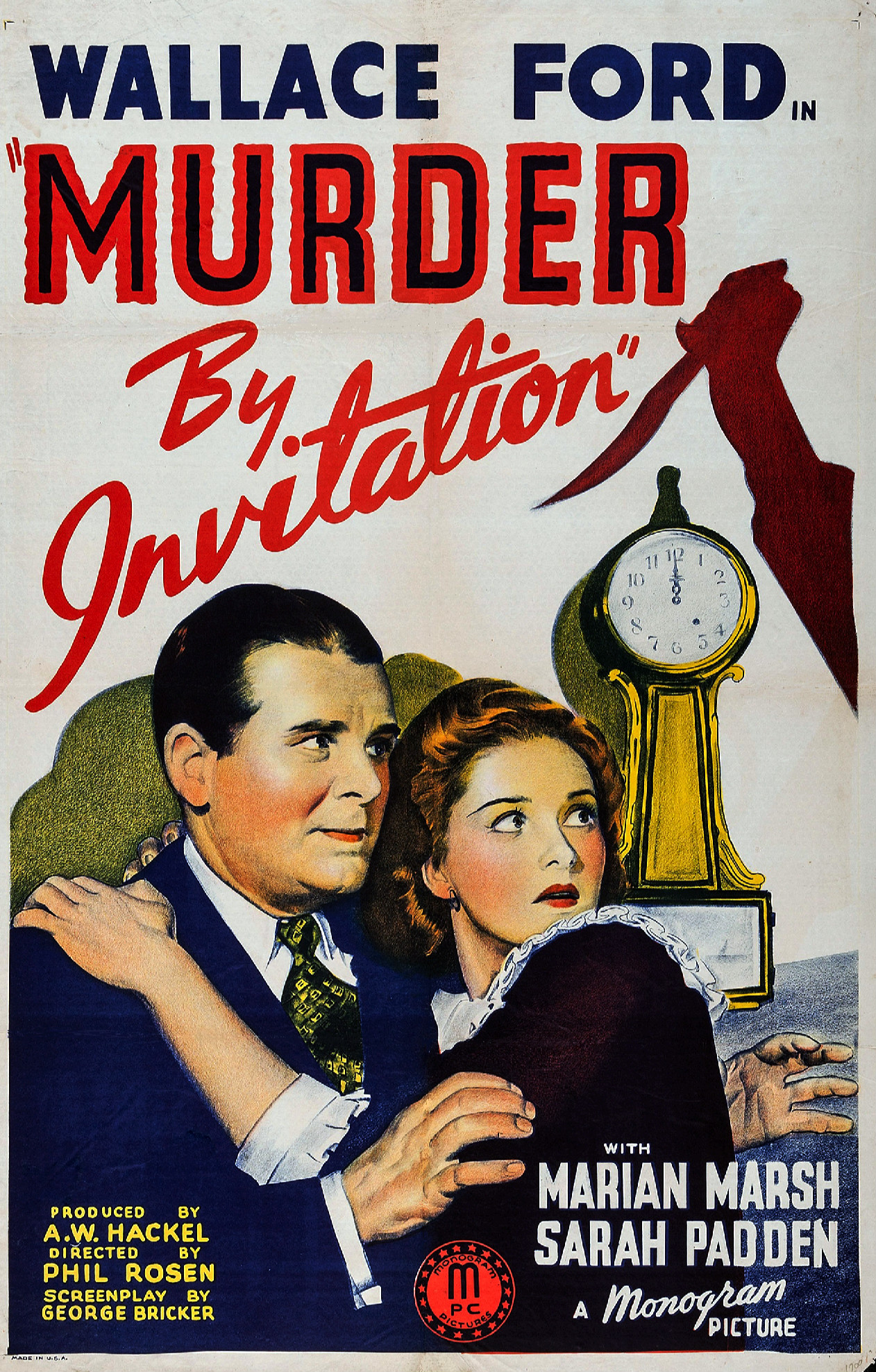
- Directed by: Phil Rosen
- Screenplay by: George Bricker
- Produced by: A.W. Hackel
- Starring: Wallace Ford; Marian Marsh; Sarah Padden
- Cinematography: Marcel Le Picard
- Edited by: Martin G. Cohn
- Production company: Supreme Pictures
- Distributed by: Monogram Pictures
- Release date: June 30, 1941
- Running time: 67 minutes
- Country: United States
- Language: English

Murder by Invitation is a 1941 American mystery film directed by Phil Rosen and starring Wallace Ford, Marian Marsh and Sarah Padden. It was distributed by Monogram Pictures.

== Plot ==
The relatives of Cassandra "Cassie" Denham, an old unmarried lady living in New York who is reputedly good for three million dollars, try to make a judge declare her unable to take care of herself financially. The attempt fails, and in charge of handing in the petition is Cassie's nephew Garson Denham, a lawyer. Instead he summons a newspaper reporter, Bob White (Wallace Ford), and his girlfriend, Nora O'Brien (Marian Marsh), and tells them he has been invited to stay a week at Cassie's estate up in the mountains.

The invitation states that any relative not arriving at the specified time will be excluded from the will. Garson believes his aunt is mentally unsound and plans to kill them all during the stay. Despite this, Garson and his wife, his brothers Tom and Larry, and their mother Martha keep the appointment.

As they arrive Cassie tells them that they are there so that she can learn which one of them should inherit the bulk of her fortune. She also tells them that she keeps all of her money at the house.

That night Garson is stabbed to death in the library. Bob and Nora receive the news of his death and show up at the estate with a photographer to write about the killing. Sheriff Boggs is already questioning everyone at the house about their whereabouts during the night, and Bob, Nora and the photographer are all invited to stay at the estate by Cassie.

The next night, Larry is killed in the library, and the sheriff continues his investigation. The dead bodies disappear and turn up again in Bob's closet, but they disappear before he is able to show them to the others.

Later, Eddie sees the bookshelf in the library open revealing a secret doorway and as Cassie comes out from one side, he walks in via the reverse side of the bookshelf, unseen by her, into a secret passage. Cassie asks Eddie to guard a small box with her valuables, offering him $10,000 to do so, and says she suspects her neighbor, Trowbridge Montrose, of being involved in the killings. The neighbor is supposedly in love with Cassie.

Tom is the next stabbed whilst he is talking to Mary, Cassie's house servant, in the garden. However, the assailant is unknown as everyone present at the property appears to possess an alibi for the time of the attack. Cassie is determined to catch the killer and tells Bob of a plan she has, saying she will see to it that everyone is outside and then set the house on fire to see who tries to run in and save the money within from destruction.

When the house is in flames, Mary suddenly panics and angrily confronts her employer, stating that she should have the money for working for her for several years and tolerating her imperiousness, saying she was entitled to inherit something, and hysterically admits committing the murders, implicating also her accomplice, Michael, the chauffeur, whom she has secretly married. She is arrested, and after a chase through the woods the chauffeur is also apprehended by Bob armed with a revolver.

Trowbridge then proposes to Cassie; Eddie presents the box to Cassie and gets his money, but the twist in the tale is that it turns out to be old Confederate States of America dollars, and quite worthless. Cassie then reveals that all of her 'fortune' is in the same currency, but Trowbridge announces that it is unimportant as he has enough for them both to live upon. The film ends with Bob also getting the girl in the form of Nora.

== Cast ==
- Wallace Ford as Bob White
- Marian Marsh as Nora O'Brien
- Sarah Padden as Aunt Cassandra ("Cassie") Hildegarde Denham
- Gavin Gordon as Garson Denham
- George Guhl as Sheriff William Boggs
- Wallis Clark as Judge Moore
- Minerva Urecal as Maxine Denham
- J. Arthur Young as Trowbridge Cadwallader Montrose
- Herb Vigran as Eddie
- Phillip Trent as Larry Denham
- Dave O'Brien as Michael, the Chauffeur
- Hazel Keener as Mary Denham
- Isabel La Mal as Martha Denham
- Lee Shumway as Eric, the Gardener
- John James as Tom Denham
- Kay Deslys as Katie, the Cook

== Bibliography ==
- Fetrow, Alan G. Feature Films, 1940-1949: a United States Filmography. McFarland, 1994.
