= The Fountain (novel) =

1932 novel

- Author: Charles Morgan
- Language: English
- Genre: War romance
- Publisher: Macmillan
- Publication date: 1932
- Publication place: United Kingdom
- Media type: Print

The Fountain is a 1932 romantic war novel by the British author Charles Morgan. It takes place in the neutral Netherlands during the First World War and is "sometimes considered his most successful work". It was awarded the Hawthornden Prize the same year.

== Film adaptation ==
In 1934 it was adapted into a Hollywood film of the same title produced by RKO Pictures. Directed by John Cromwell.
