= Edwin Maxwell (actor) =

Irish actor (1886–1948)

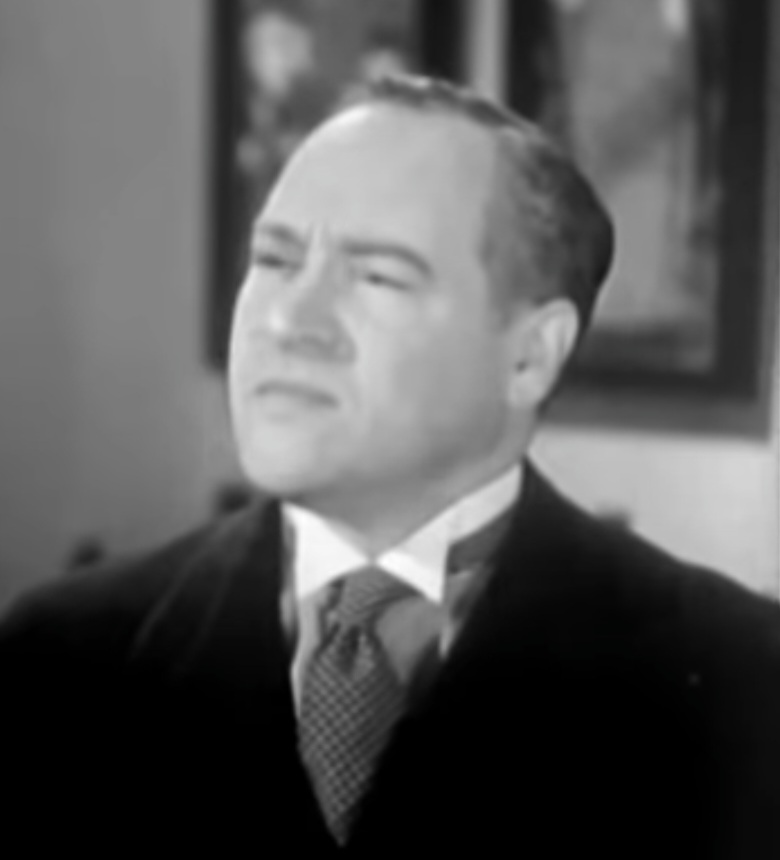
- Maxwell in Romance on the Run (1938)
- Born: 9 February 1886; Dublin, Ireland
- Died: 13 August 1948 (aged 62); Falmouth, Massachusetts, U.S.
- Occupation: Actor
- Years active: 1918–1948
- Spouse: Betty Alden

Edwin Maxwell (9 February 1886 – 13 August 1948) was an Irish character actor in Hollywood movies of the 1930s and 1940s, frequently cast as businessmen and shysters, though often ones with a pompous or dignified bearing. Prior to that, he was an actor on the Broadway stage and a director of plays.

== Early life ==
Maxwell was a native of Dublin.

== Career ==
In the late 1920s, Maxwell directed and acted in plays with the New York Theater Guild Repertory Company.

From 1939 to 1942, Maxwell served as the dialogue director for the films of epic director Cecil B. DeMille. He was often uncredited for many of his film appearances. Maxwell appeared in four Academy Award-winning Best Pictures: All Quiet on the Western Front (1930), Grand Hotel (1932), The Great Ziegfeld (1936) and You Can't Take It with You (1938).

== Personal life ==
Maxwell married actress Betty Alden. Maxwell died following a stroke.

== Filmography ==
- The Taming of the Shrew (1929, film debut) as Baptista
- All Quiet on the Western Front (1930) as Mr. Bäumer (uncredited)
- Top Speed (1930) as J.W. Rollins (uncredited)
- Du Barry, Woman of Passion (1930) as Maupeou
- The Gorilla (1930) as Cyrus Stevens
- Inspiration (1931) as Uncle Julian Montell
- Kiki (1931) as Dr. Smiley
- Daybreak (1931) as Herr Hoffman
- Daddy Long Legs (1931) as Wykoff (uncredited)
- Men of the Sky (1931) as Count
- The Magnificent Lie (1931) as Eye Specialist (uncredited)
- New Adventures of Get Rich Quick Wallingford (1931) as Adam Carver the Hotel Manager (uncredited)
- Wicked (1931) as Owner of property
- The Yellow Ticket (1931) as Police Agent Boligoff
- Ambassador Bill (1931) as Monte Montgomery
- Two Kinds of Women (1932) as Deputy Police Commissioner (uncredited)
- The Impatient Maiden (1932) as Prof. Von Mueller (uncredited)
- Shopworn (1932) as Bierbauer (uncredited)
- The Cohens and Kellys in Hollywood (1932) as Chauncey Chadwick
- Scarface (1932) as Chief of Detectives
- Young Bride (1932) as The Doctor
- Grand Hotel (1932) as Dr. Waitz
- The World and the Flesh (1932) (uncredited)
- The Trial of Vivienne Ware (1932) as Detective (uncredited)
- The Strange Case of Clara Deane (1932) as Judge (uncredited)
- While Paris Sleeps (1932) as Prison Commandant (uncredited)
- Merrily We Go to Hell (1932) as Jake Symonds (uncredited)
- American Madness (1932) as Clark (uncredited)
- Blessed Event (1932) as Sam Gobel
- Those We Love (1932) as Marshall
- Tiger Shark (1932) as Doctor (uncredited)
- Six Hours to Live (1932) as Police Commissioner
- The Girl from Calgary (1932) as Earl Darrell
- You Said a Mouthful (1932) as Dr. Vorse
- The Son-Daughter (1932) as Chinese Priest (uncredited)
- Frisco Jenny (1932) as Tom Ford (uncredited)
- Tonight Is Ours (1933) as Mob Leader
- State Trooper (1933) as W.J. Brady
- Mystery of the Wax Museum (1933) as Joe Worth
- Night of Terror (1933) as The Maniac
- Emergency Call (1933) as Tom Rourke
- Heroes for Sale (1933) as Laundry Company President
- Gambling Ship (1933) as D.A
- The Mayor of Hell (1933) as Louis Johnson
- The Woman I Stole (1933) as Lentz
- The Man Who Dared (1933) as Fletcher (uncredited)
- The Narrow Corner (1933) as Man Fred Killed (uncredited)
- Dinner at Eight (1933) as Mr. Fitch, Hotel Manager
- This Day and Age (1933) as Mayor's Assistant (uncredited)
- Broadway to Hollywood (1933) as Rockwell (uncredited)
- I Loved a Woman (1933) as Gossiper (uncredited)
- Ann Vickers (1933) as Defense Attorney (uncredited)
- Police Car 17 (1933) as Big Bill Standish
- Big Time or Bust (1933) as Winthrop Allen
- Fog (1933) as Ship Captain
- Duck Soup (1933) as Secretary of War (uncredited)
- Christopher Bean (1933) as Auctioneer (uncredited)
- Lady Killer (1933) as Jeffries, Theatre Manager (uncredited)
- Miss Fane's Baby Is Stolen (1934) as Judge (uncredited)
- The Ninth Guest (1934) as Jason Osgood
- This Side of Heaven (1934) as R.S. Sawyer (uncredited)
- Dancing Man (1934) as Morton Randall
- Mystery Liner (1934) as Major Pope
- Hollywood Party (1934) as Producer Buddy Goldfarb (uncredited)
- The Life of Vergie Winters (1934) as Rally Speaker (uncredited)
- Burn 'Em Up Barnes (1934) as Lyman Warren
- Back Page (1934) as Martin Regal
- The Cat's-Paw (1934) as District Attorney Neal
- Gift of Gab (1934) as Norton, President WGAB
- Cleopatra (1934) as Casca
- Elinor Norton (1934) as Army Doctor (uncredited)
- All the King's Horses (1935) as First Gentleman (uncredited)
- Great God Gold (1935) as Nitto
- G Men (1935) as Joseph Kratz (uncredited)
- The Devil Is a Woman (1935) as Tobacco Plant Manager (uncredited)
- Motive for Revenge (1935) as William King
- Men of Action (1935) as Jefferson, Crooked Banker
- The Crusades (1935) as Ship's Master (uncredited)
- Happiness C.O.D. (1935) as Lester Walsh
- The Last Days of Pompeii (1935) as The Augur, a Pompeii Official (uncredited)
- Thanks a Million (1935) as Mr. Casey
- Dangerous Waters (1936) as Mr. Brunch
- The Great Ziegfeld (1936) as Charles Frohman (uncredited)
- Big Brown Eyes (1936) as Editor
- Mr. Deeds Goes to Town (1936) as Douglas (uncredited)
- Panic on the Air (1936) as Gordon
- Absolute Quiet (1936) as Mr. Baxter (uncredited)
- Fury (1936) as Will Vickery
- To Mary - with Love (1936) as Byron C. Wakefield
- Come and Get It (1936) as Sid LeMaire
- The Plainsman (1936) as Secretary of War Edwin Stanton (uncredited)
- Camille (1936) as Doctor (uncredited)
- A Man Betrayed (1936) as Richards
- Torture Money (1937, Short) as Milton Beacher
- Love Is News (1937) as Kenyon
- Night Key (1937) as Kruger
- A Star Is Born (1937) as Vocal Coach (uncredited)
- The Road Back (1937) as Principal
- Slave Ship (1937) as Auctioneer
- Slim (1937) as Corton (uncredited)
- One Hundred Men and a Girl (1937) as Ira Westing, Editor (uncredited)
- Love Takes Flight (1937) as Dave Miller
- Nothing Sacred (1937) as Mr. Bullock (uncredited)
- Paradise for Three (1938) as First Lawyer (uncredited)
- Romance on the Run (1938) as Mondoon
- Hold That Kiss (1938) as Theatre Manager (uncredited)
- The Rage of Paris (1938) as Hotel Manager (uncredited)
- Rich Man, Poor Girl (1938) as Mr. Krauss, the Shoe Store Manager (uncredited)
- You Can't Take It with You (1938) as Attorney to Kirby (uncredited)
- Vacation from Love (1938) as Samson Hatfield (uncredited)
- Made for Each Other (1939) as Messerschmidt (uncredited)
- Young Mr. Lincoln (1939) as John T. Stuart (uncredited)
- Way Down South (1939) as Martin Dill
- Drums Along the Mohawk (1939) as Reverend Daniel Gros
- Ninotchka (1939) as Mercier
- The Shop Around the Corner (1940) as Doctor
- His Girl Friday (1940) as Dr. Max J. Eggelhoffer
- The Blue Bird (1940) as Oak
- Pound Foolish (1940, Short) as George Reynolds (uncredited)
- Parole Fixer (1940) as Edward Murkil (uncredited)
- Jack Pot (1940, Short) as Rocky Fallon
- New Moon (1940) as Captain de Jean
- Brigham Young (1940) as 2nd Mob Leader
- Kit Carson (1940) as John Sutter
- The Devil and Miss Jones (1941) as Withers
- Ride on Vaquero (1941) as Dan Clark
- Blossoms in the Dust (1941) as City Councilman (uncredited)
- Buy Me That Town (1941) as P.V. Baxter
- Pacific Blackout (1941) as District Attorney
- Know for Sure (1942, Short) as Dr. Paxton (uncredited)
- Ten Gentlemen from West Point (1942) as Sen. John Randolph
- I Live on Danger (1942) as Wingy Keefe
- Street of Chance (1942) as Stillwell, D.A.
- Behind Prison Walls (1943) as Percy Webb
- Heaven Can Wait (1943) as Doctor (uncredited)
- Holy Matrimony (1943) as King Edward VII (uncredited)
- Waterfront (1944) as Max Kramer
- Since You Went Away (1944) as Businessman in Cocktail Lounge (uncredited)
- The Great Moment (1944) as vice-president of Medical Society
- Wilson (1944) as William Jennings Bryan
- Practically Yours (1944) as Radio Official (uncredited)
- The Great John L. (1945) as Exhibition Ring Announcer (uncredited)
- Mama Loves Papa (1945) as Kirkwood
- Swamp Fire (1946) as Capt. Pierre Moise
- The Jolson Story (1946) as Oscar Hammerstein (uncredited)
- Second Chance (1947) as Mr. Davenport
- The Gangster (1947) as Johnny, Politician (uncredited)
- Campus Honeymoon (1948) as Sen. Hughes
- The Vicious Circle (1948) as Presiding Judge
- The Walls of Jericho (1948) as Porter Grimes (uncredited) (final film role)
