= Roar of the Press =

1941 film by Phil Rosen

- DVD cover
- Directed by: Phil Rosen
- Screenplay by: Albert Duffy
- Story by: Alfred Block
- Produced by: Scott R. Dunlap
- Starring: Jean Parker; Wallace Ford; Suzanne Kaaren
- Cinematography: Harry Neumann
- Edited by: Jack Ogilvie
- Color process: Black and white
- Production company: Monogram Pictures
- Distributed by: Monogram Pictures
- Release date: April 18, 1941
- Running time: 71 minutes
- Country: United States
- Language: English

Roar of the Press is a 1941 American comedy drama crime film directed by Phil Rosen and starring Jean Parker, Wallace Ford and Suzanne Kaaren. It was produced and distributed as a second feature by Monogram Pictures.

== Plot ==
Married only a few hours, small-town girl Alice makes her first visit to New York with new husband Wally Williams, a hotshot reporter for the Globe.

A body falls from a building. Williams steals the identification and calls in the story to city editor MacEwen, who makes Wally follow it up. Reporters' wives warn Alice to expect this kind of thing.

A personal ad leads Wally to a second corpse. The police read about in the Globe and angrily haul Wally in for questioning. Alice's irritation grows, as does that of reporters from other newspapers at Wally's continued scoops.

Evildoers from an anti-American organization kidnap Wally, and when he won't reveal how he gets his information, they grab Alice as well. Sparrow McGraun runs a numbers racket but likes Wally better than these foreigners, so he saves the newlyweds. A grateful Wally gives this scoop to every paper except the Globe.

== Cast ==
- Jean Parker as Alice Williams
- Wallace Ford as Wally Williams
- Jed Prouty as Gordon MacEwan
- Suzanne Kaaren as Angela Brooks
- Harland Tucker as Harry Brooks
- Evalyn Knapp as Evelyn
- Robert Frazer as Louis Detmar
- Dorothy Lee as Frances Harris
- John Holland as Robert Mallon
- Maxine Leslie as Mrs. Mabel Leslie
- Paul Fix as 'Sparrow' McGraun
- Betty Compson as Mrs. Thelma Tate
- Matty Fain as Nick Paul
- Eddie Foster as Fingers
- Charles King as Police Lieutenant Homer Thomas
- Frank O'Connor as Police Lieutenant Jim Hall
- Dennis Moore as Henchman Toughy
- Robert Pittard as Tommy

== See also ==
- List of American films of 1941
- List of films in the public domain in the United States

== Bibliography ==
- Boggs, Johnny D. American Newspaper Journalists on Film: Portrayals of the Press During the Sound Era. McFarland, 2022.
- Fetrow, Alan G. Feature Films, 1940-1949: a United States Filmography. McFarland, 1994.
