= Barbara Pepper =

American actress (1915–1969)

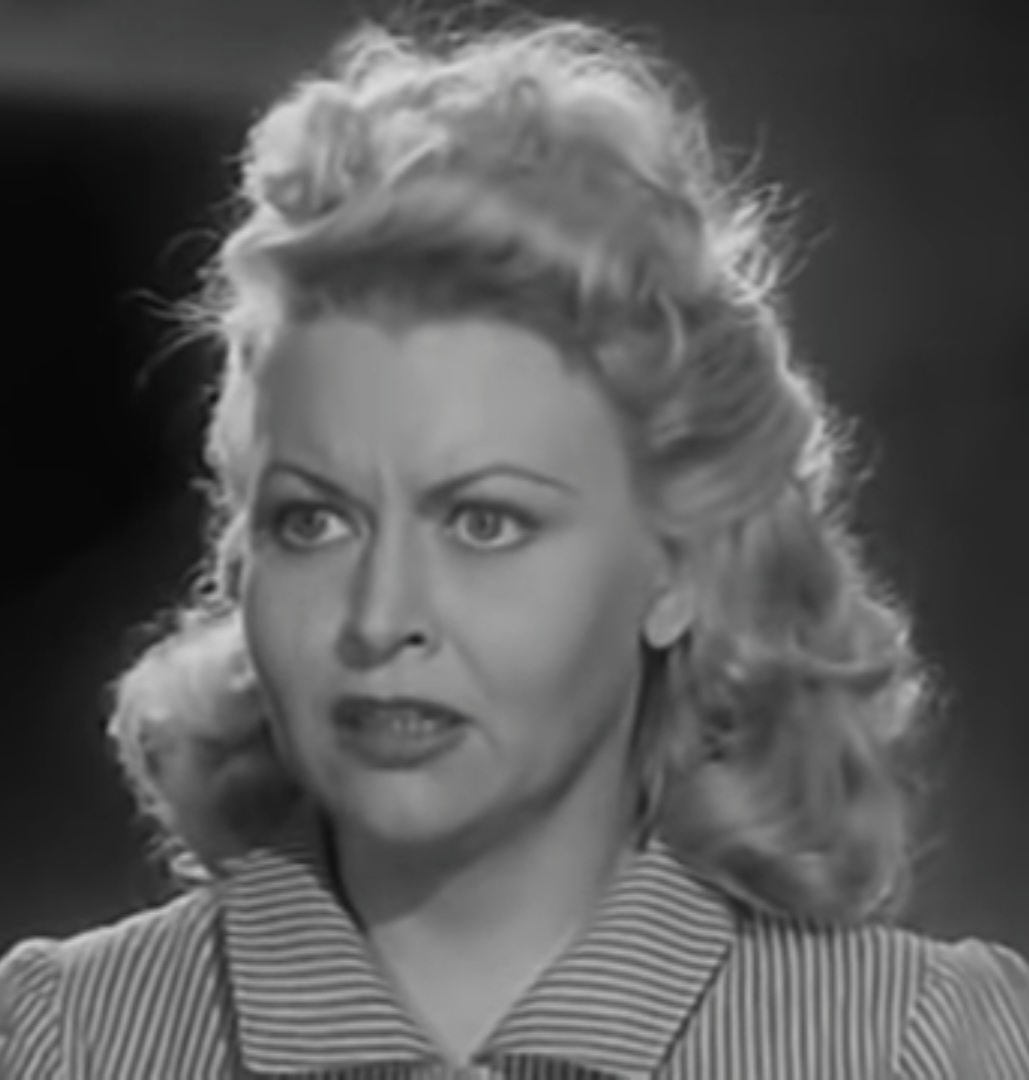
- Pepper in Girls in Chains (1943)
- Born: Marion Pepper; May 31, 1915; New York City, U.S.
- Died: July 18, 1969 (aged 54); Panorama City, Los Angeles, U.S.
- Other name: Barbara P. Enfield (married name)
- Occupation: Actress
- Years active: 1931–1969
- Spouse: Craig Reynolds (m. 1943; died 1949)

Barbara Pepper (born Marion Pepper; May 31, 1915 – July 18, 1969) was an American stage, television, radio, and film actress. She is best remembered as the original Doris Ziffel on the sitcom Green Acres.

== Early life and career ==
Marion Pepper was born in New York City, the daughter of actor David Mitchell "Dave" Pepper, and his wife, Harrietta S. Pepper. At age 16, she started life in show business with Goldwyn Girls, a musical stock company, where she met Lucille Ball, with whom she would remain friends, during production of Eddie Cantor's Roman Scandals in 1933.

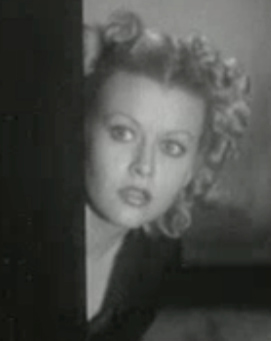
Pepper in The Rogues' Tavern

From 1937 to 1943, Pepper was a prolific actress, appearing in 43 movies, mostly in supporting roles or in minor films, with exceptions being main characters in The Rogues' Tavern and Mummy's Boys, both feature films released in 1936. Among her later film parts were small roles in It's a Mad, Mad, Mad, Mad World (1963) and My Fair Lady (1964). She also performed radio parts.

In 1943, she married actor Craig Reynolds (né Harold Hugh Enfield), and the couple later had two sons. After Reynolds died in 1949 in a California motorcycle accident, Pepper was left to raise their children alone. She never remarried.

After a substantial weight gain during the 1950s, Pepper's roles were mostly confined to small character parts on television, including several appearances on I Love Lucy, The George Burns and Gracie Allen Show, Petticoat Junction, and The Jack Benny Program. She made four appearances on Perry Mason, including the role of Martha Dale, mother of the title character, in the 1957 episode "The Case of the Vagabond Vixen". In 1957, she guest-starred in the episode "The Diet" of the sitcom Mr. Adams and Eve, credited as "Fat Woman". In 1958, she appeared as "Boxcar Annie" on the television Western Tales of Wells Fargo in the episode titled "Butch Cassidy". In 1959, she appeared on the TV series The Texan as Mary Devlin in the episode "The Telegraph Story".

A longtime friend of Lucille Ball, Pepper was considered for the role of Ethel Mertz on I Love Lucy (after Bea Benaderet), but was passed over, purportedly because she had an alcohol addiction. Ironically, William Frawley ("Fred Mertz") also was an alcoholic, but he had already been chosen for the Mertz role. At that time, the casting directors were concerned that two alcoholics in the upcoming cast might eventually cause difficulties, so another actress was sought.

Pepper may be best remembered as the first Doris Ziffel on Petticoat Junction in 1964, although her character's name on the "Genghis Keane" episode of Petticoat Junction was Ruth Ziffel. Her role as Doris Ziffel continued on Green Acres from 1965 to 1968 until health ailments finally forced her to leave that weekly series. Actress Fran Ryan replaced Pepper on Green Acres, which ran until 1971. Pepper's final performance was in Hook, Line & Sinker (1969), in which she played Jerry Lewis's secretary.

== Death ==
Pepper died of a coronary thrombosis at age 54 on July 18, 1969, in Panorama City, California.

== Selected filmography ==
- Roman Scandals (1933) - Goldwyn Girl (uncredited)
- Moulin Rouge (1934) - Show Girl (uncredited)
- Bottoms Up (1934) - Chorine (uncredited)
- Strictly Dynamite (1934) - Performer (uncredited)
- Our Daily Bread (1934) - Sally
- Kid Millions (1934) - Goldwyn Girl (uncredited)
- Let 'Em Have It (1935) - Milly
- Dante's Inferno (1935) - Drunk at Ship's Cafe (uncredited)
- Anna Karenina (1935) - Party Girl (uncredited)
- Waterfront Lady (1935) - Gloria Vance
- The Sagebrush Troubadour (1935) - Joan Martin
- Forced Landing (1935) - Nancy 'Dusty' Rhodes
- Frisco Waterfront (1935) - The Blonde Stranger
- The Fighting Coward (1935) - Marie's Friend (uncredited)
- The Singing Vagabond (1935) - Honey
- Taming the Wild (1936) - Hazel White
- Show Boat (1936) - New Year's Eve Cutie (uncredited)
- The Rogues Tavern (1936) - Marjorie Burns
- M'Liss (1936) - Clytie Morpher
- Mummy's Boys (1936) - Mary Browning
- The Big Game (1936 film) - Lois - the Drunk's Girl (uncredited)
- Wanted! Jane Turner (1936) - Marge Sanders - Posing as Jane Turner
- Winterset (1936) - Girl
- What Becomes of the Children? (1936) - Elsie Ford
- Sea Devils (1937) - Spanked Blonde (uncredited)
- Too Many Wives (1937) - Angela Brown
- The Outcasts of Poker Flat (1937) - Blonde Saloon Floozie
- You Can't Buy Luck (1937) - Store Clerk
- You Can't Beat Love (1937) - May 'Bubbles' Smith
- The Big Shot (1937) - Mamie
- Forty Naughty Girls (1937) - Alice
- Music for Madame (1937) - Blonde on Bus (uncredited)
- The Westland Case (1937) - Agatha Hogan
- Portia on Trial (1937) - Evelyn
- Hollywood Stadium Mystery (1938) - Althea Ames
- Wide Open Faces (1938) - Belle
- The Lady in the Morgue (1938) - Kay Renshaw
- The Chaser (1938) - Mabel the Drunken Girl (uncredited)
- Army Girl (1938) - Riki Thomas
- The Strange Case of Dr. Meade (1938) - Mattie
- Sweethearts (1938) - Telephone Operator (uncredited)
- The Girl Downstairs (1938) - Woman at the Bar (uncredited)
- They Made Me a Criminal (1939) - Budgie
- Off the Record (1939) - Flossie - Telephone Operator (uncredited)
- Bachelor Mother (1939) - Dance-Hall Hostess (uncredited)
- The Magnificent Fraud (1939) - June (uncredited)
- Colorado Sunset (1939) - Ginger Bixby
- Flight at Midnight (1939) - Mildred
- The Women (1939) - Tough Girl (uncredited)
- Three Sons (1939) - Viola
- Scandal Sheet (1939) - Rena
- The Amazing Mr. Williams (1939) - Muriel - Wedding Guest (uncredited)
- Of Mice and Men (1939) - Second Girl (uncredited)
- Castle on the Hudson (1940) - Goldie
- Framed (1940) - Goldie Green
- Forgotten Girls (1940) - Eve Abbott
- Women in War (1940) - Millie, Irish Nurse
- Sailor's Lady (1940) - Maude
- The Return of Frank James (1940) - Nellie Blane
- Foreign Correspondent (1940) - Dorine
- Ride, Kelly, Ride (1941) - Trudy (uncredited)
- The Cowboy and the Blonde (1941) - Chorine in Dressing Room (uncredited)
- Out of the Fog (1941) - Cuban Room Cigarette Girl (uncredited)
- Three Sons o' Guns (1941) - Francie
- Manpower (1941) - Polly
- We Go Fast (1941) - Southern Belle with Traffic Fine (uncredited)
- Man at Large (1941) - Myrtle, Hotel Guest
- South of Tahiti (1941) - Julie (uncredited)
- Birth of the Blues (1941) - Maizie
- My Favorite Spy (1942) - Speedy (uncredited)
- One Thrilling Night (1942) - Lettie
- Star Spangled Rhythm (1942) - Blonde Who Bruises Too Easy (uncredited)
- Girls in Chains (1943) - Ruth
- Let's Face It (1943) - Daisy (uncredited)
- So This Is Washington (1943) - Betty - Taxi Driver (uncredited)
- Cover Girl (1944) - Chorus Girl (uncredited)
- Henry Aldrich Plays Cupid (1944) - Wild Rose (uncredited)
- Once Upon a Time (1944) - Taxi Girl (uncredited)
- Since You Went Away (1944) - Bowling Alley Pin Girl (uncredited)
- I Love a Soldier (1944) - Blonde (uncredited)
- An American Romance (1944) - Streetwalker (uncredited)
- Can't Help Singing (1944) - Saloon Girl (uncredited)
- Brewster's Millions (1945) - Cab Driver (uncredited)
- Trouble Chasers (1945) - Goldie
- The Naughty Nineties (1945) - Gilded Cage Hostess (uncredited)
- Murder, He Says (1945) - Bonnie Fleagle
- The Strange Affair of Uncle Harry (1945) - Annie (uncredited)
- Prison Ship (1945) - Winnie De Voe (uncredited)
- The Hoodlum Saint (1946) - Dance Contestant #1 (uncredited)
- Terror Trail (1946) - Karen Kemp, the Louisville Lady
- The Millerson Case (1947) - Eadie Rookstool (uncredited)
- The Snake Pit (1948) - Patient (uncredited)
- The Crooked Way (1949) - Shooting Gallery Proprietress (uncredited)
- The Inspector General (1949) - Buxom Villager (uncredited)
- Unmasked (1950) - Mrs. Schmidt
- No Way Out (1950) - Woman (uncredited)
- The Fuller Brush Girl (1950) - Wife Watching TV (uncredited)
- My Blue Heaven (1950) - Susan (uncredited)
- Thunderbirds (1952) - Mrs. Louise Braggart
- So This Is Love (1953) - Fat Girl with Sailor in Nightclub (uncredited)
- Inferno (1953) - Waitress (uncredited)
- The Eddie Cantor Story (1953) - Patron (uncredited)
- A Star Is Born (1954) - Esther's Neighbor (uncredited)
- Young at Heart (1954) - Wife (uncredited)
- The D.I. (1957) - Woman Customer
- Rock-A-Bye Baby (1958) - Mrs. Oberholt (uncredited)
- Auntie Mame (1958) - Mrs. Krantz (uncredited)
- The Bramble Bush (1960) - Polly Welk (uncredited)
- Sex Kittens Go to College (1960) - Circe - Big Woman with Ripped Dress (uncredited)
- The Music Man (1962) - Feril Hawkes - Snapping Beans (uncredited)
- It's Only Money (1962) - Fisherwoman
- A Child Is Waiting (1963) - Miss Brown (uncredited)
- It's a Mad, Mad, Mad, Mad World (1963) - Woman on Phone at Garage (uncredited)
- Who's Minding the Store? (1963) - Customer at Bargain Sale (uncredited)
- The Patsy (1964) - Bowler (uncredited)
- My Fair Lady (1964) - Doolittle's Dance Partner (uncredited)
- Kiss Me, Stupid (1964) - Big Bertha
- Hook, Line & Sinker (1969) - Peter's Secretary (uncredited)
