= The Nut Farm =

1935 film by Melville W. Brown

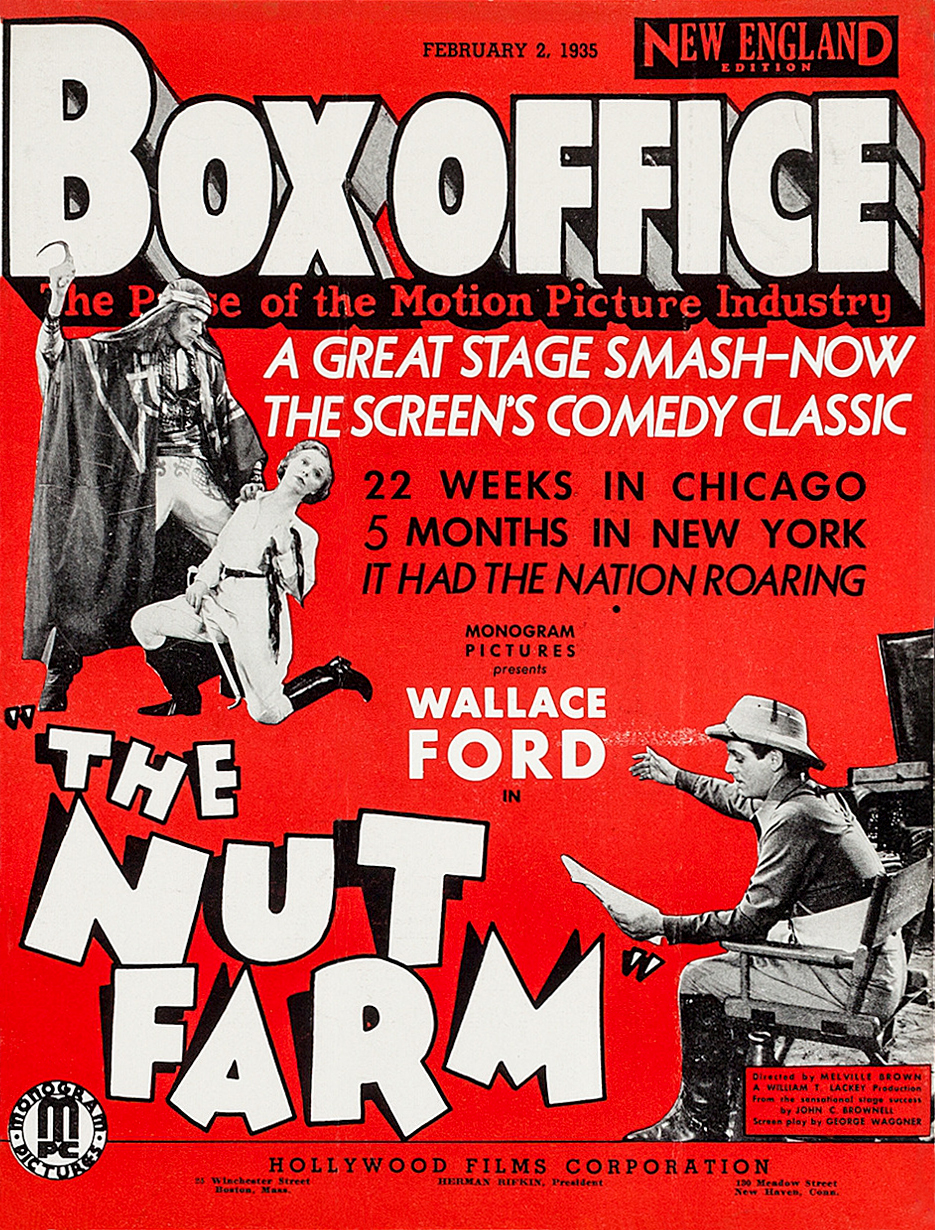
- The Nut Farm featured on the cover of Boxoffice magazine (February 2, 1935)
- Directed by: Melville W. Brown
- Written by: George Waggner (adaption and screenplay); John C. Brownell (based on his play: The Nut Farm)
- Produced by: William T. Lackey (producer)
- Starring: See below
- Cinematography: Harry Neumann
- Edited by: Carl Pierson
- Release date: 1935
- Running time: 65 minutes
- Country: United States
- Language: English

The Nut Farm is a 1935 American film directed by Melville W. Brown, adapted from the John Charles Brownell Broadway play of the same name, which ran for 40 performances from 14 Oct.-Nov. 1929 at the Biltmore Theater (now the Samuel J. Friedman Theatre). Wallace Ford is the titled star and the only cast-member common to the play and film. According to the New York Times film review, other than Ford, "There is not much else for it to boast about." The play's original, copyrighted title was It's the Climate (1928).

== Plot ==
Bob and Helen decide to move to California and make a fresh start. Bob wants to buy a nut farm, but Helen and her brother Willie Barton dream of being in the movies: Helen as a star, Willie as a director. Film-producing con-artists descend on the family, and comedy ensues.

== Cast ==
- Wallace Ford as Willie Barton
- Betty Alden as Helen Barton Brent
- Florence Roberts as Ma Barton, Willie's Mother
- Spencer Charters as Sliscomb, the Landlord
- Oscar Apfel as Bob Bent, Helen's Husband
- Bradley Page as Hamilton T. Holland, Acting School
- Lorin Raker as Biddleford, Holland's Writer
- Arnold Gray as Eustace Van Norton, Holland's Actor
- Joan Gale as Agatha Sliscomb
