= Wallace Ford =

English-American actor (1898–1966)

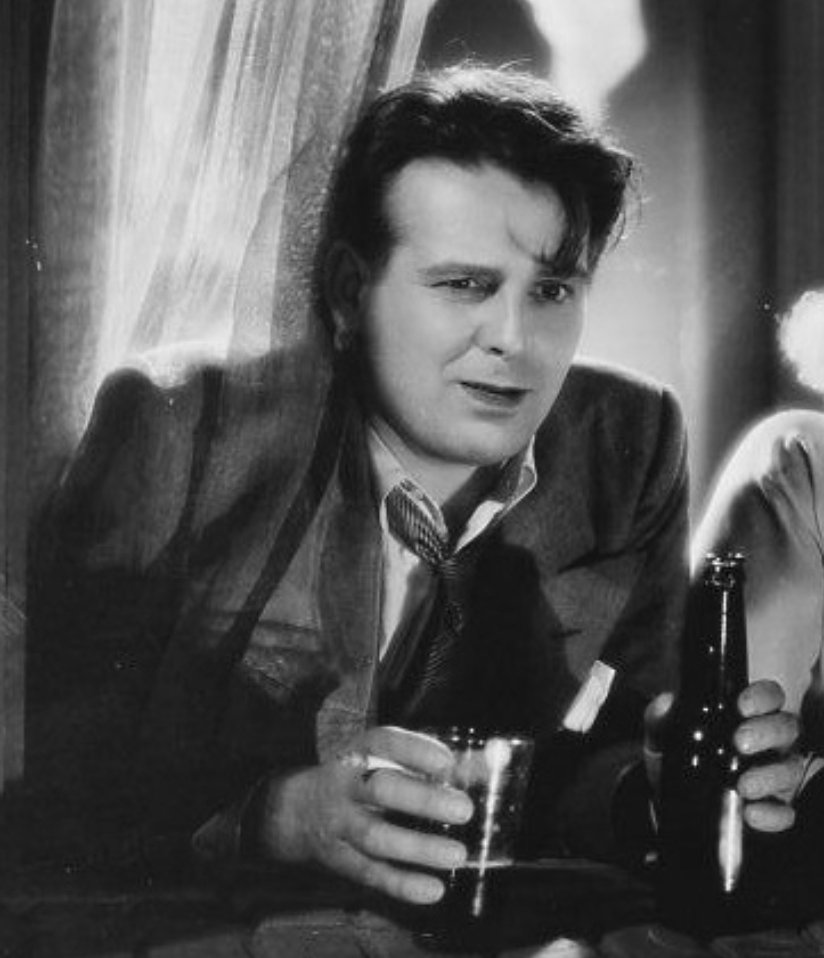
- Ford in The Beast of the City (1932)
- Born: Samuel Grundy Jones; 12 February 1898; Bolton, Lancashire, England
- Died: 11 June 1966 (aged 68); Los Angeles, California, U.S.
- Resting place: Holy Cross Cemetery, Culver City
- Occupations: Actor; stage performer; vaudevillian
- Years active: 1918–1965
- Spouse: Martha Haworth (m. 1922; died 1966)
- Children: 1

Wallace Ford (born Samuel Grundy Jones; 12 February 1898 – 11 June 1966) was an English–American vaudevillian, stage performer and screen actor. Usually playing wise-cracking characters, he combined a tough but friendly-faced demeanor with a small but powerful, stocky physique.

== Early life ==
Ford was born Samuel Grundy Jones in Bolton, Lancashire, England, into a working-class family of limited means who left him in the care of an aunt and uncle. At the age of three, his uncle and aunt left him with Barnardo's orphanage because they were unable to maintain him and their own children. When he was seven, he and other children from similar backgrounds were shipped to Canada to new foster families as a part of the British Empire's ongoing programme to populate the territory.

Jones was adopted by a family in Manitoba. He was ill-treated and became a serial runaway, being resettled several times with different families by the Canadian authorities. According to his own account, at the age of 11 he ran away for the last time and joined a vaudeville traveling troupe touring Canada called the Winnipeg Kiddies, from which he acquired his initial training as a performer.

In 1914, 16-year-old Jones and another youth named Wallace Ford decided to head south to the United States to seek their fortunes, riding a freight train illicitly. During the trip, Ford was killed beneath the wheels of a train. Later, Jones adopted as his stage name the name of his dead traveling companion.

== Acting career ==
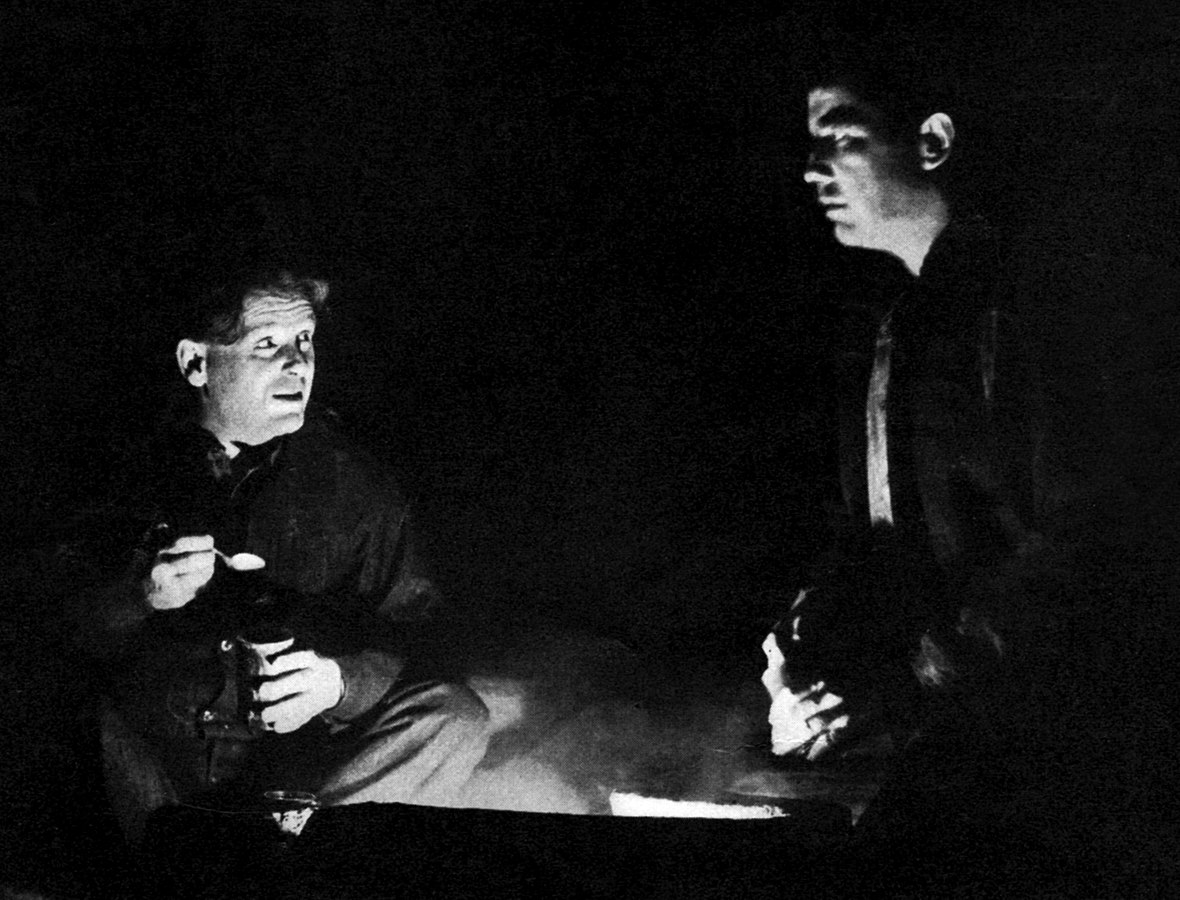
Ford (left) and Broderick Crawford in the original Broadway production of Of Mice and Men (1938)

Following his service as a trooper in the army at Fort Riley, Kansas, with the United States Cavalry during World War I, he became a vaudeville stage actor in an American stock company. In 1919, he performed in an adaptation of Booth Tarkington's Seventeen, which played to full houses in Chicago for several months, before transferring to a successful run on Broadway in New York City. Ford became a successful Broadway performer through the Roaring Twenties, appearing in multiple productions, including the lead role in the Broadway smash hit Abie's Irish Rose.

In motion pictures, Ford made his credited debut with Possessed in 1931, appearing with Clark Gable and Joan Crawford, and the next year he was given the lead in Metro-Goldwyn-Mayer's Freaks, directed by Tod Browning. Ford went on to have an extensive career over 30 years, appearing in more than 150 films, with lead roles in the 1930s and '40s in Hollywood B movies such as The Rogues' Tavern (1936), Murder by Invitation (1941), and Roar of the Press (1941) and supporting roles in larger feature films such as The Lost Patrol (1934), The Informer (1935), Shadow of a Doubt (1943), Spellbound (1945), and Dead Reckoning (1947).

In 1938, Ford returned to the Broadway stage to play the role of George in the original production of Of Mice and Men. In 1945, Ford appeared in the film Blood on the Sun alongside Jimmy Cagney, whose physique and acting style resembled his own. In the late 1940s and early 1950s, he transitioned into a character actor, appearing as a regular performer in the newly fashionable Western genre, and in multiple John Ford productions as one of his preferred support players.

In the latter stage of his career, during the 1950s and early 1960s, Ford performed increasingly on television. He had a recurring role in the Western series The Deputy starring Henry Fonda and his final appearance on the "small screen" was on The Andy Griffith Show in 1964, playing Roger Hanover, Aunt Bee's old flame, who unsuccessfully attempts to obtain a payoff from Andy by implying an engagement to Bee if Andy refuses. The next year, he appeared in A Patch of Blue, for which he received a Golden Laurel nomination. Ford's performance as Ole Pa in A Patch of Blue proved to be the final role of his extensive acting career. He died just six months after the film’s release.

== Personal life ==
Ford became a naturalized United States citizen on 8 May 1942; by this act, he also legally changed his name from Samuel Grundy to Wallace Ford. He met his future wife, Martha Haworth, in 1922 while they were performing together on Broadway in Abie's Irish Rose, she being a chorus girl at the time. They had one child, a daughter named Patricia (1927–2005).

After the death of his wife in February 1966, Ford moved into the Motion Picture & Television Country House and Hospital at Woodland Hills, California, and died in the hospital there of heart failure four months later. His body was buried in an unmarked grave at Culver City's Holy Cross Cemetery.

== Broadway credits ==
Date	Title	Role	Notes
29 August – September 1921	The Poppy God	Higgins	Hudson Theatre, New York
6 March–?, 1922	Broken Branches	Arthur Weldon	39th Street Theatre, New York
22 October – November 1923	Nobody's Business	Oliver Pratt	Klaw Theatre, New York
14 January – February 1924	Gypsy Jim	Tom Blake	49th Street Theatre, New York
31 March – May 1924	Nancy Ann	Dan Dennis	49th Street Theatre, New York
1 September 1924 – June 1925	Pigs	Thomas Atkins Jr.	Little Theatre, New York
14 January – March 1929	Gypsy	Mac	Klaw Theatre, New York
14 October – November 1929	The Nut Farm	Willie Barton	Klaw Theatre, New York
23 November 1937 – May 1938	Of Mice and Men	George	Music Box Theatre, New York
26 December 1939 – 6 January 1940	Kindred	Dermot O'Regan (Prologue)	Maxine Elliott Theatre, New York

== Filmography ==
=== Film ===
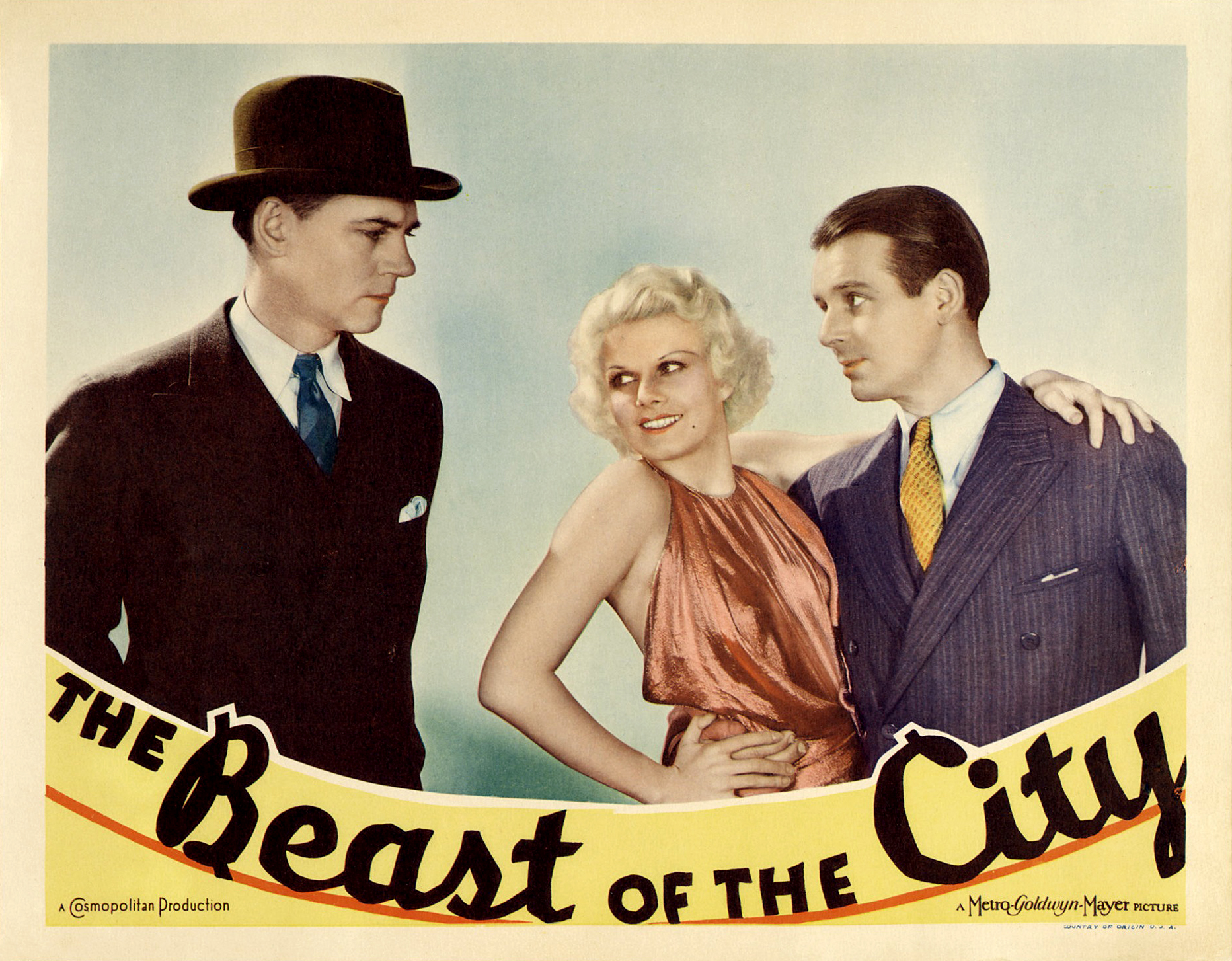
Lobby card for The Beast of the City (1932) featuring Walter Huston, Jean Harlow and Wallace Ford

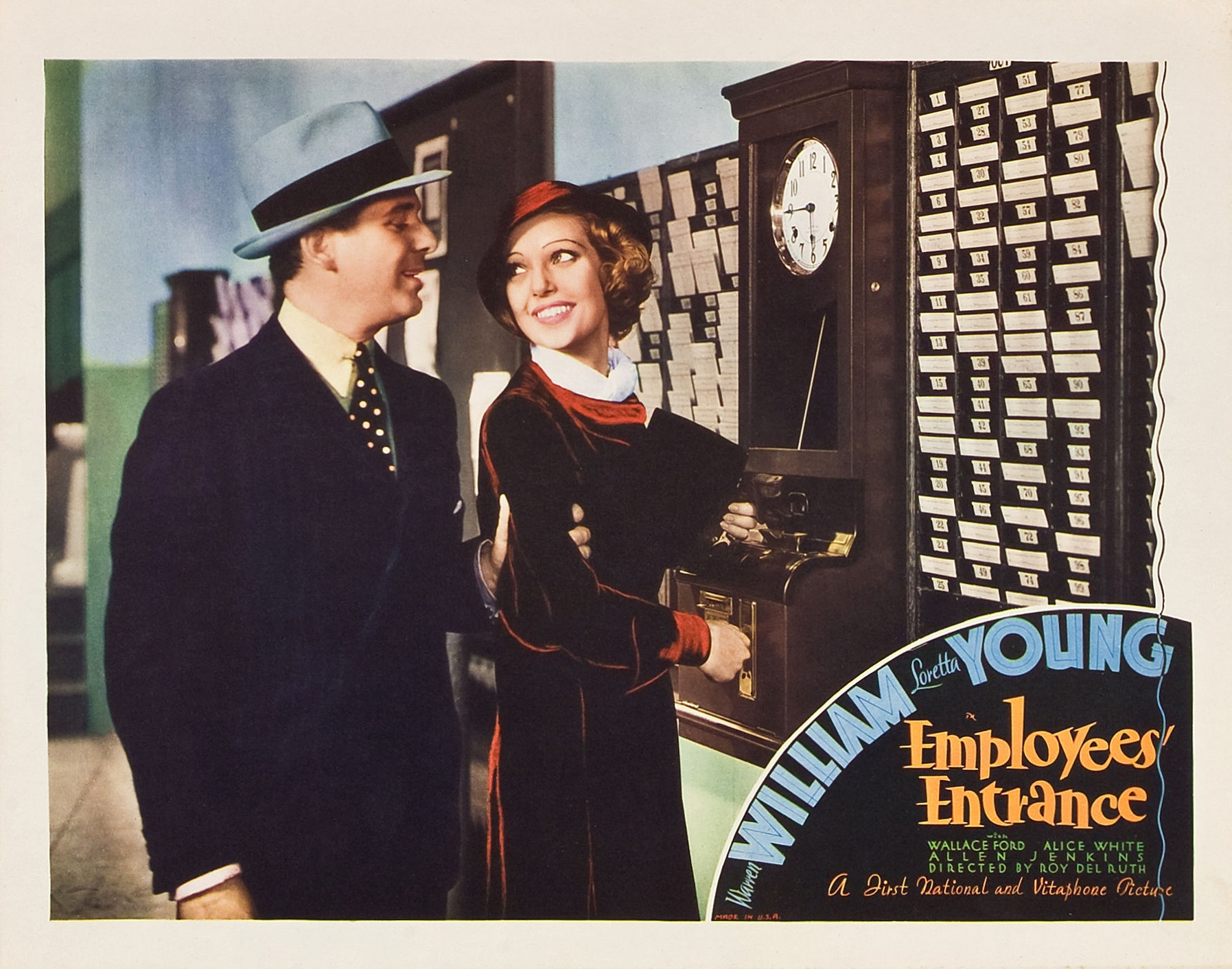
Lobby card for Employees' Entrance (1933) featuring Wallace Ford and Loretta Young

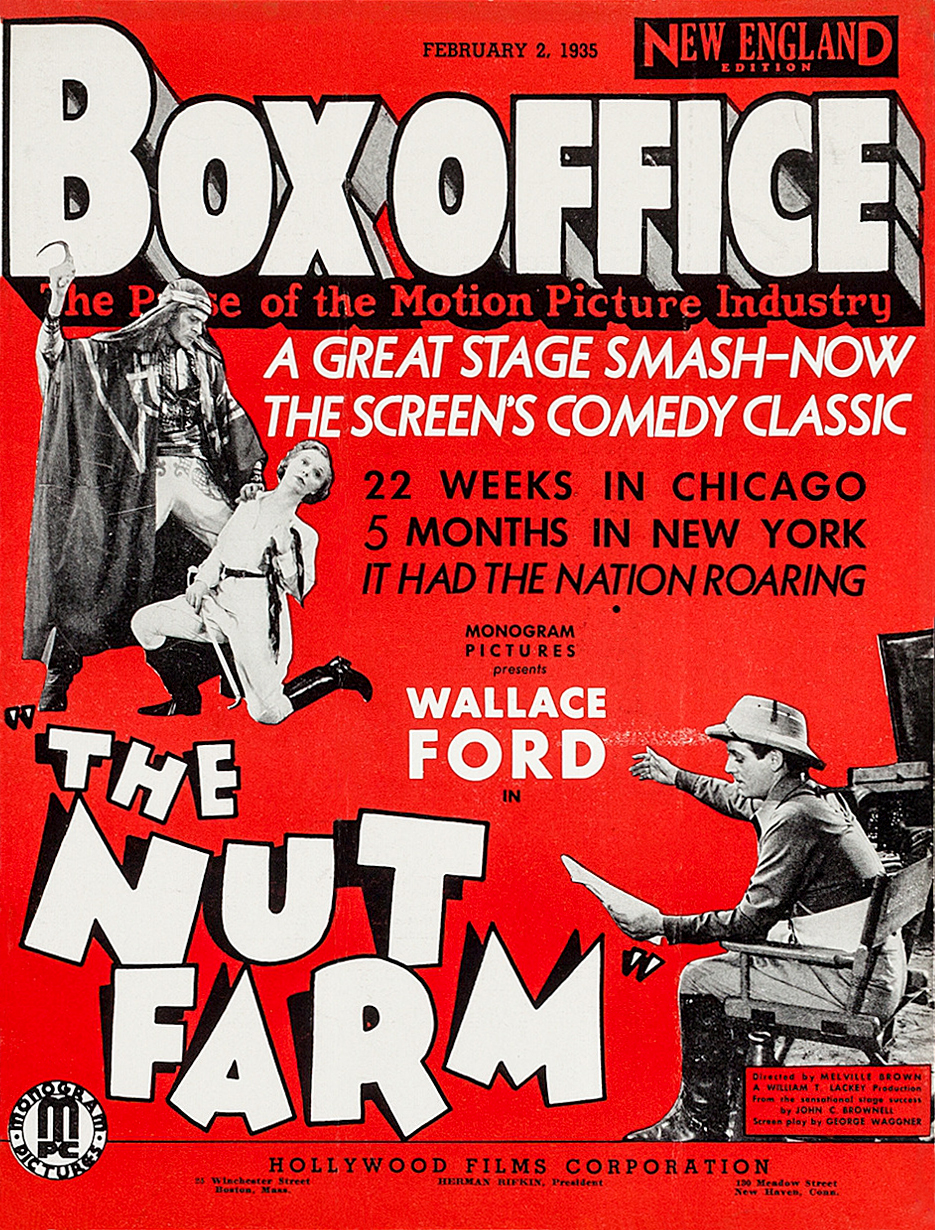
Ford recreated his 1929 Broadway role in the 1935 film The Nut Farm

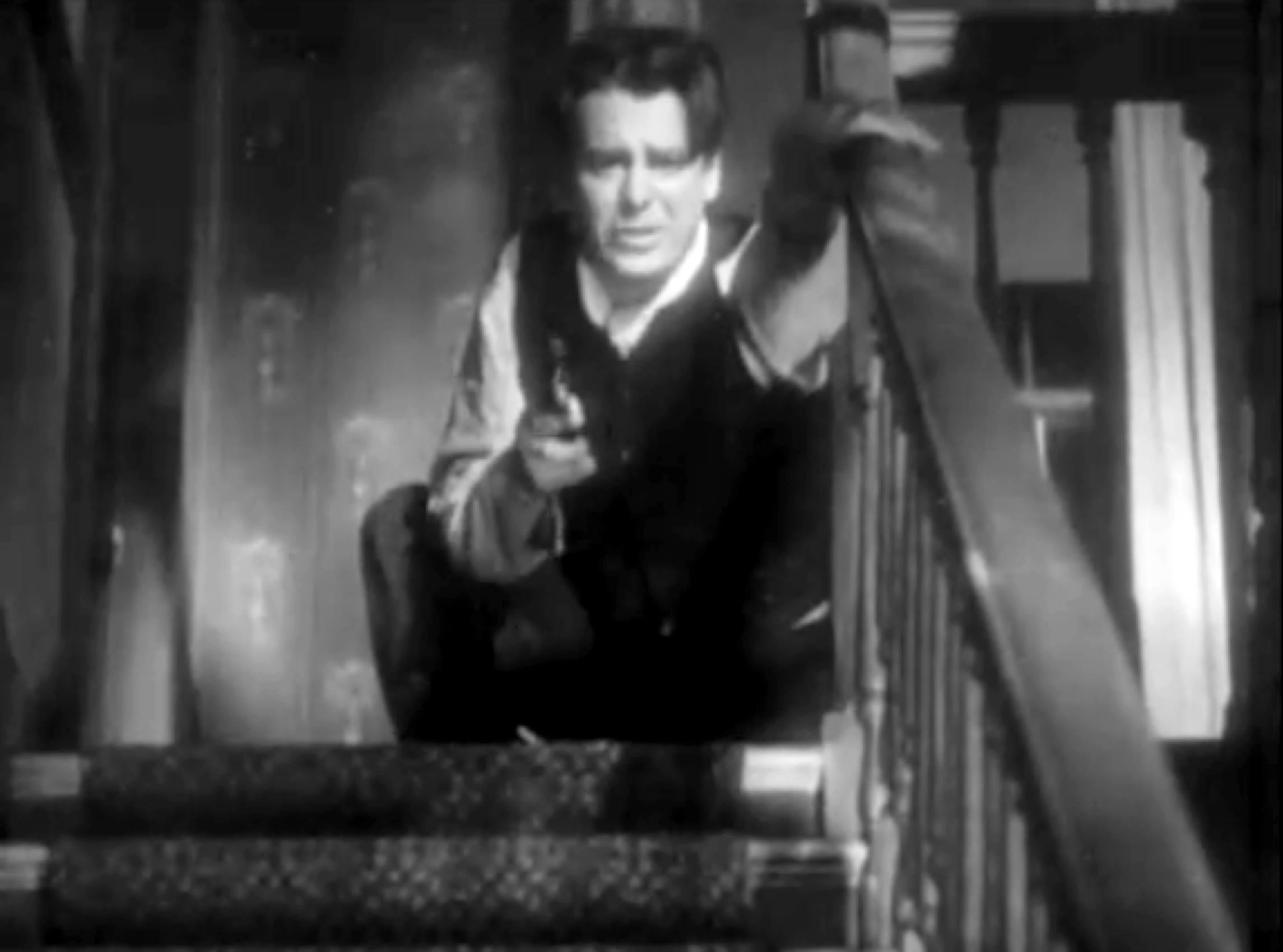
Wallace Ford in The Informer (1935)

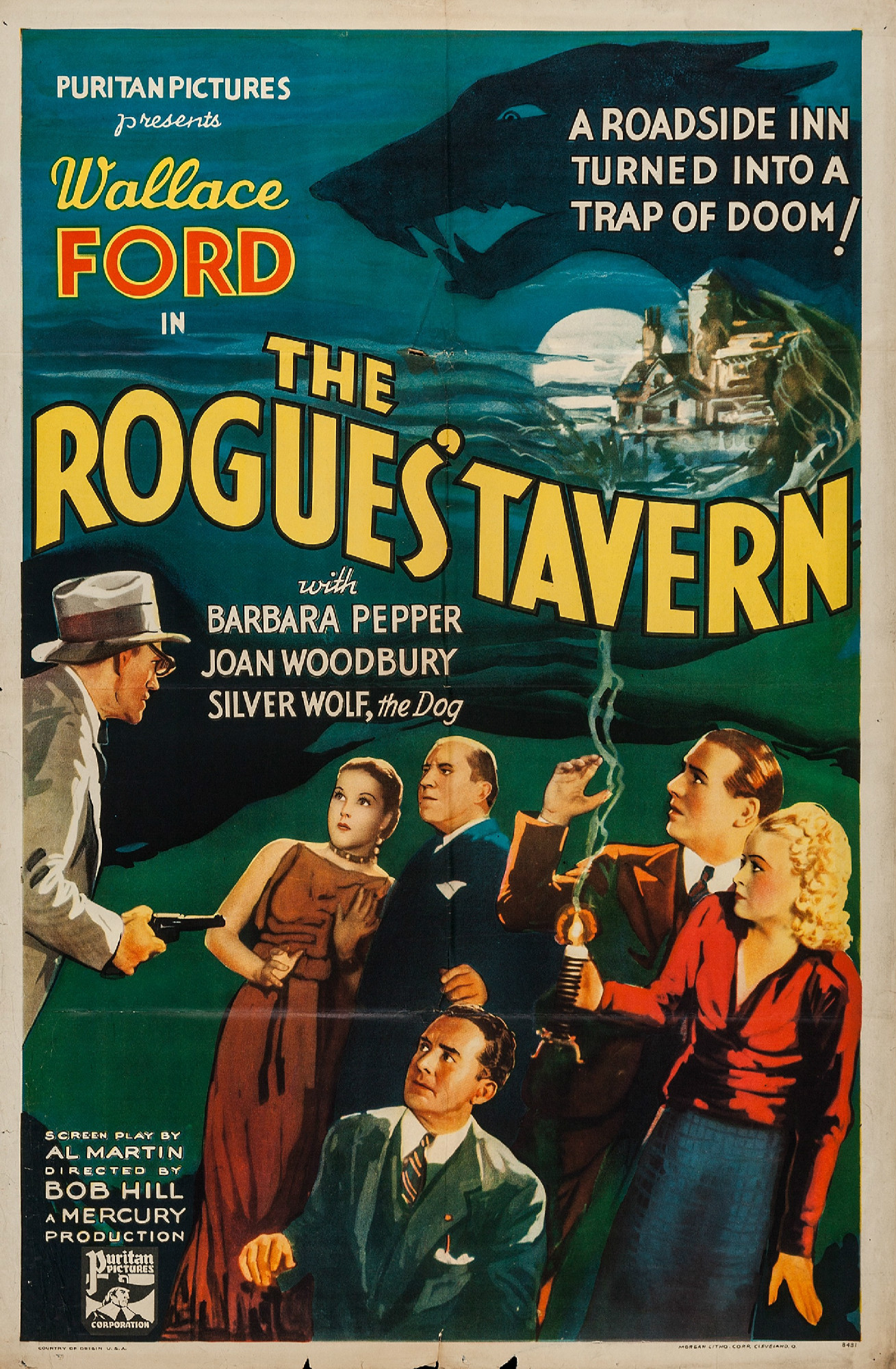
Poster for The Rogue's Tavern (1936)

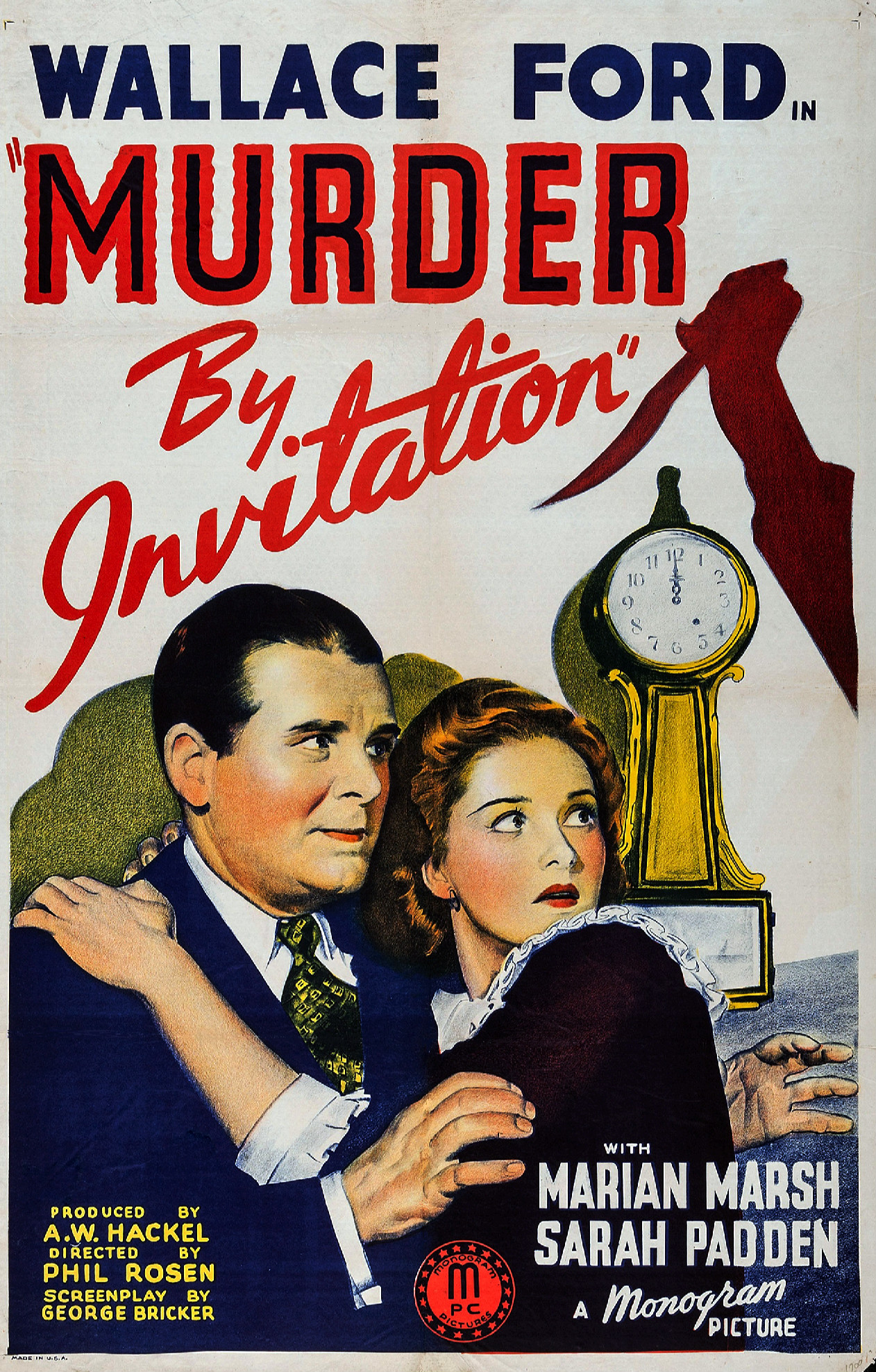
Poster for Murder by Invitation (1941)

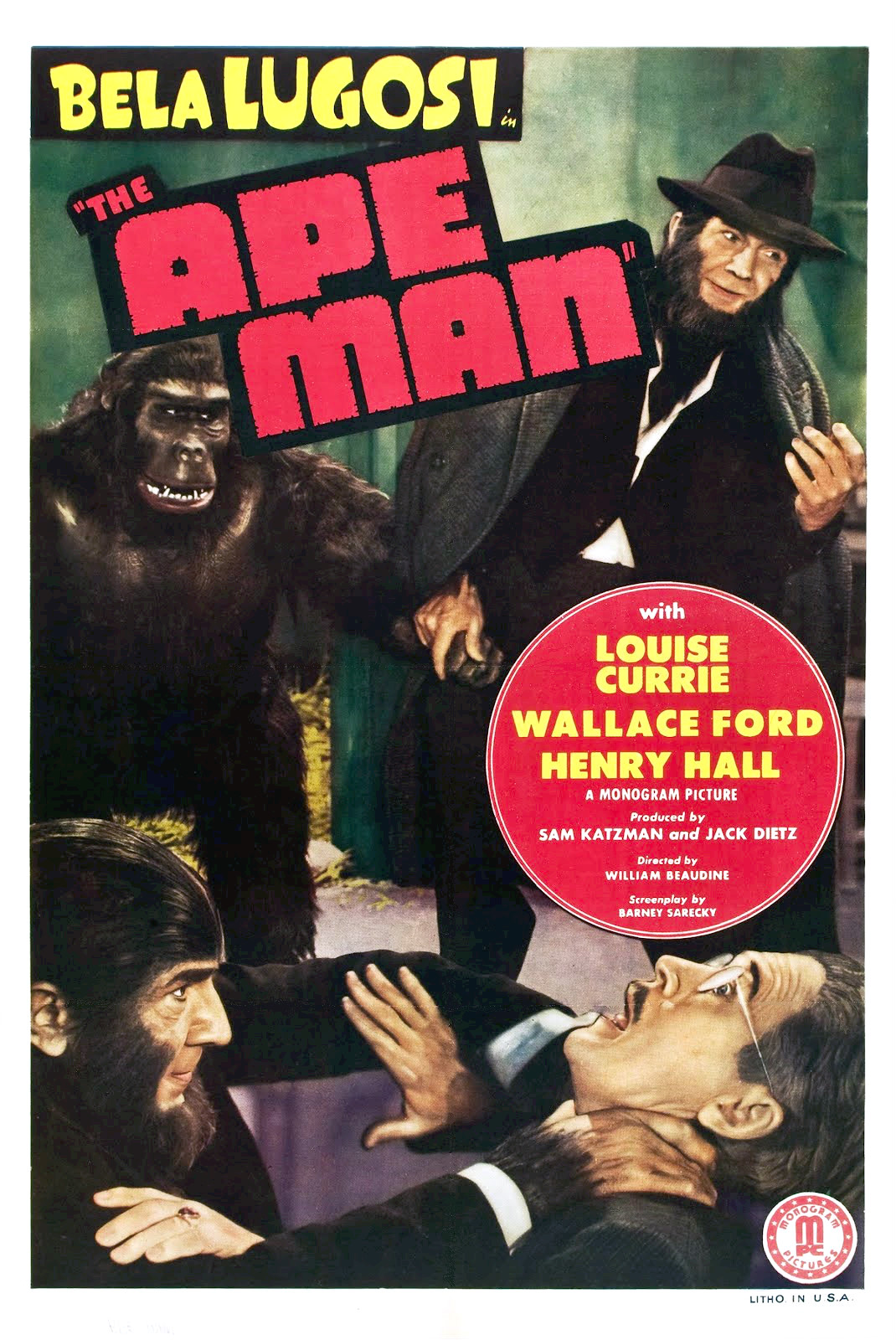
Poster for The Ape Man (1943)

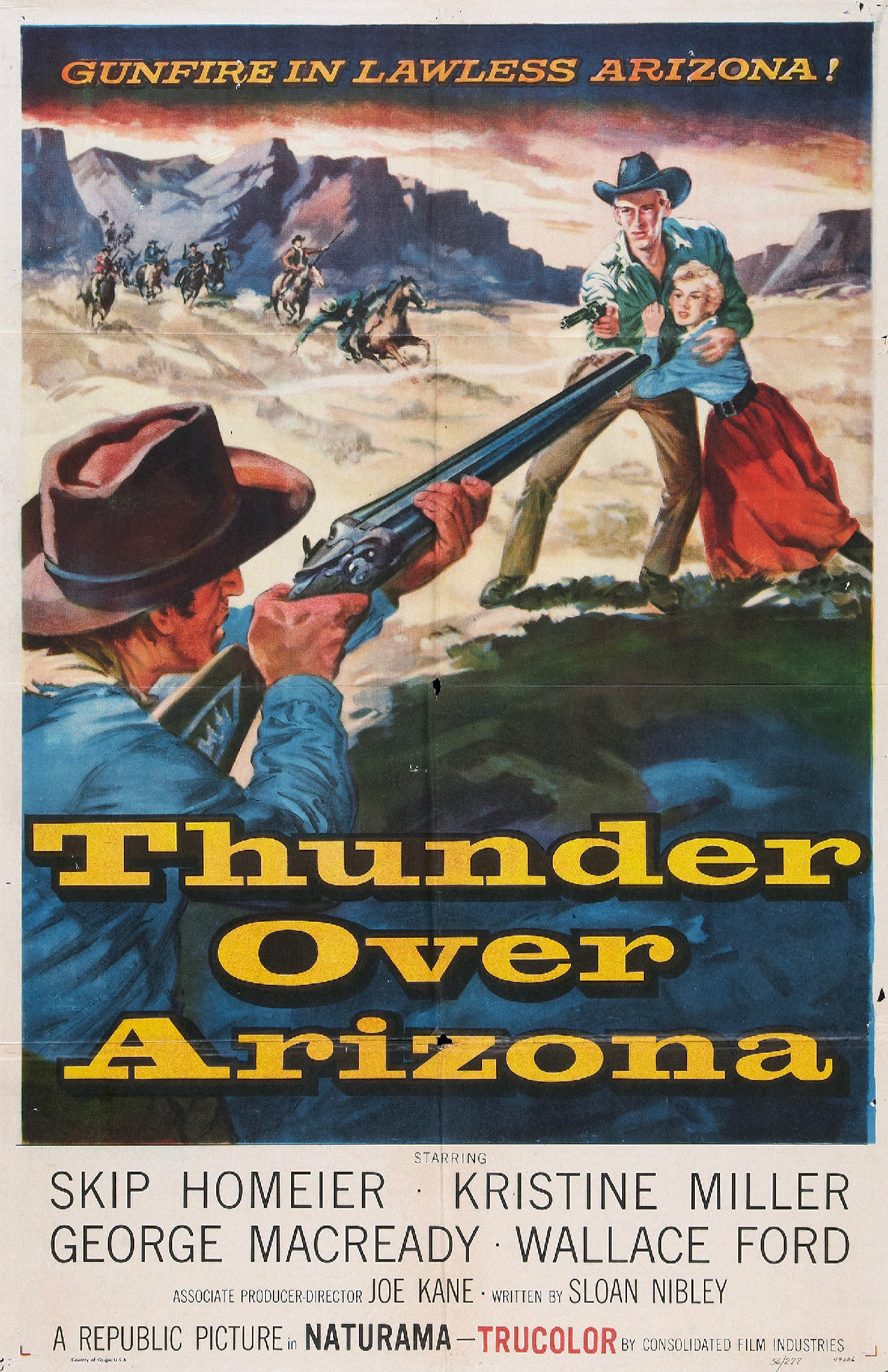
Poster for Thunder Over Arizona (1956)

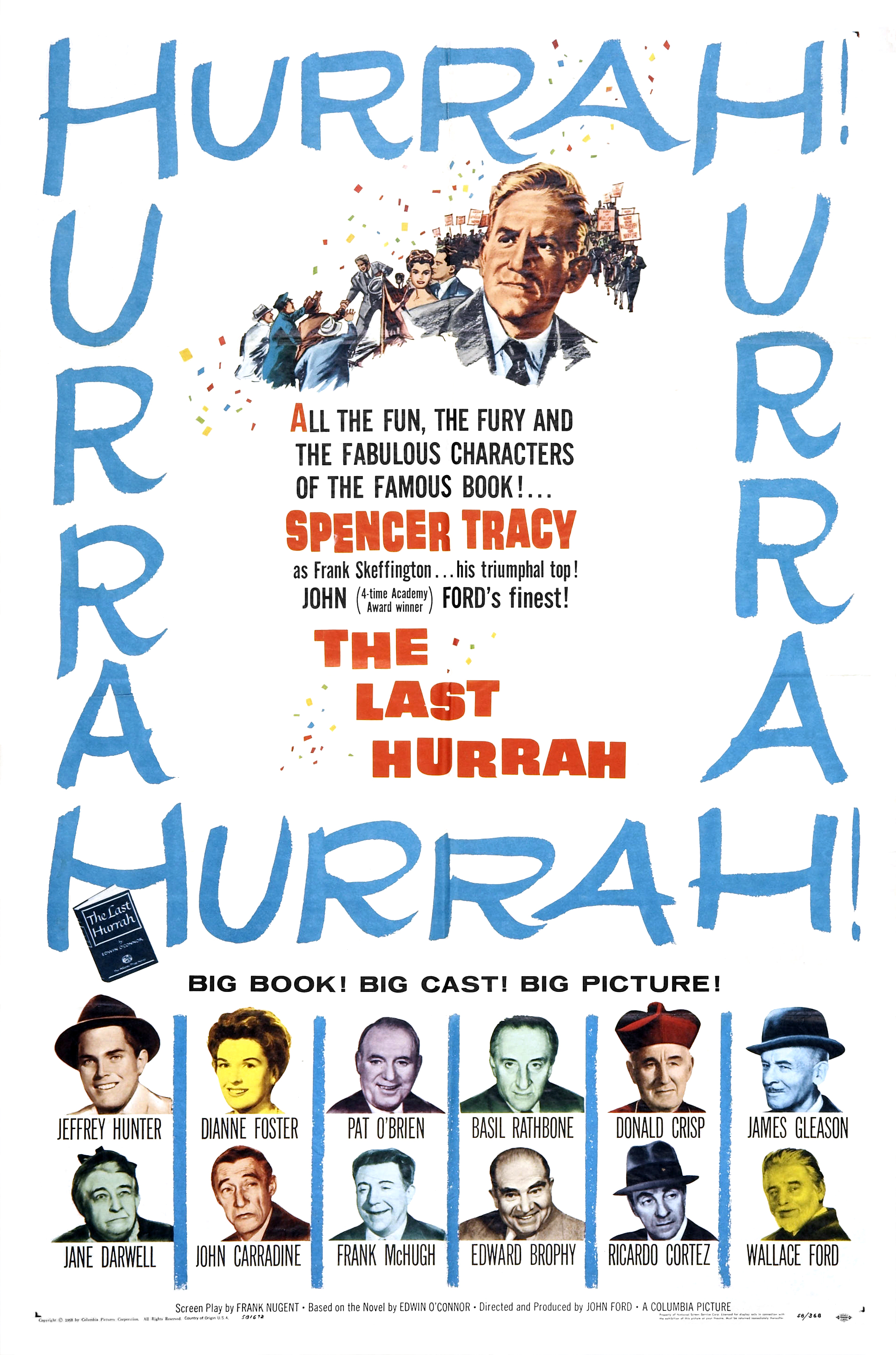
Poster for The Last Hurrah (1958)

Year	Title	Role	Notes
1929	Married in Hollywood	Mitzi's Fan	Uncredited
1931	Possessed	Al Manning	
1931	X Marks the Spot	Ted Lloyd	
1932	Freaks	Phroso	
1932	The Beast of the City	Ed Fitzpatrick	
1932	The Wet Parade	Jerry Tyler	
1932	Are You Listening?	Larry Barnes	
1932	Skyscraper Souls	Slim	
1932	Central Park	Rick	
1932	Hypnotized	Bill Bogard	
1933	Employees' Entrance	Martin West	
1933	Night of Terror	Tom Hartley	
1933	The Big Cage	Russ Penny	
1933	Headline Shooter	Mike	
1933	Three-Cornered Moon	Kenneth Rimplegar	
1933	Goodbye Again	Arthur Westlake	
1933	My Woman	Chick Rollins	
1933	East of Fifth Avenue	Vic Howard	
1934	Money Means Nothing	Joe Flynn	
1934	The Lost Patrol	Morelli	
1934	Men in White	Shorty	
1934	I Hate Women	Scoop McGuire	
1934	Money Means Nothing	Kenneth 'Kenny' McKay	
1934	The Mysterious Mr. Wong	Jason H. Barton	
1934	The Man Who Reclaimed His Head	Curly	
1935	The Whole Town's Talking	Healy	
1935	In Spite of Danger	Bob Crane	
1935	The Nut Farm	Willie Barton	
1935	One Frightened Night	Joe Luvalie	
1935	Swell-Head	Terry McCall	
1935	Men of the Hour	Andy Blane	
1935	The Informer	Frankie McPhillip	
1935	Get That Man	Jack Kirkland / John Prescott	
1935	She Couldn't Take It	Fingers Boston	
1935	Mary Burns, Fugitive	Harper	
1935	Another Face	Joe Haynes	
1936	Two in the Dark	Harry Hillyer	
1936	Absolute Quiet	Jack	
1936	The Rogues' Tavern	Jimmy Kelly	
1936	A Son Comes Home	Steve	
1937	You're in the Army Now	Jimmy Tracy	
1937	Jericho	Mike Clancy	
1937	Exiled to Shanghai	Ted Young	
1938	Swing It, Sailor!	Pete Kelly	
1938	Stardust	Peter Jackson	
1938	The Marines Come Thru	Pvt. 'Singapore' Stebbins	re-released in 1943 as Fight On, Marines
1939	Back Door to Heaven	Frankie Rogers	
1940	Isle of Destiny	Millard Barnes	
1940	Two Girls on Broadway	Jed Marlowe	
1940	Love, Honor, and Oh Baby!	Joe Redmond	
1940	Scatterbrain	Sam Maxwell	
1940	The Mummy's Hand	Babe Jenson	
1940	Give Us Wings	Mr. York	
1941	A Man Betrayed	Casey	
1941	Roar of the Press	Wally Williams	
1941	Murder by Invitation	Bob White	
1941	Blues in the Night	Brad Ames	
1942	All Through the Night	Spats Hunter	
1942	Inside the Law	Billy	
1942	Scattergood Survives a Murder	Wally Collins	
1942	The Mummy's Tomb	Babe Hanson	
1942	Seven Days' Leave	Sergeant Mead	
1943	Shadow of a Doubt	Fred Saunders	
1943	The Ape Man	Jeff Carter	
1943	The Cross of Lorraine	Pierre Flandeau	
1944	Secret Command	Miller	
1944	Machine Gun Mama	Johnny O'Reilly	
1945	Blood on the Sun	Ollie Miller	
1945	The Great John L.	McManus	
1945	On Stage Everybody	Emmett Rogers	
1945	Spellbound	Stranger in hotel lobby	
1946	A Guy Could Change	Bill Conley	
1946	The Green Years	Jamie Nigg	
1946	Lover Come Back	Tubbs	
1946	Rendezvous with Annie	Al Morgan	
1946	Black Angel	Joe	
1946	Crack-Up	Lieutenant Cochrane	
1947	Dead Reckoning	McGee	
1947	Magic Town	Lou Dicketts	
1947	T-Men	The schemer	
1948	The Man from Texas	Jed	
1948	Shed No Tears	Sam Grover	
1948	Embraceable You	Police Lt. Ferria	
1948	Coroner Creek	Andy West	
1948	Belle Starr's Daughter	Lafe Bailey	
1949	The Set-Up	Gus	
1949	Red Stallion in the Rockies	Talky Carson	
1950	Dakota Lil	Carter	
1950	The Furies	Scotty Hyslip	
1950	The Breaking Point	F.R. Duncan	
1950	Harvey	Ellis Logfren	
1951	He Ran All the Way	Mr. Dobbs	
1951	Warpath	Private Potts	
1951	Painting the Clouds with Sunshine	Sam Parks	
1952	She Couldn't Say No	Joe Wheelen	
1952	Rodeo	Barbecue Jones	
1952	Flesh and Fury	Jack "Pop" Richardson	
1953	The Great Jesse James Raid	Elias Hobbs	
1953	The Nebraskan	Mac McBride	
1954	The Boy from Oklahoma	Wally Higgins	
1954	Destry	Doc Curtis	
1954	3 Ring Circus	Sam Morley	
1955	The Man from Laramie	Charley O'Leary	
1955	Wichita	Arthur Whiteside	
1955	Lucy Gallant	Gus Basserman	
1955	A Lawless Street	Dr. Amos Wynn	
1955	The Spoilers	Flapjack Simms	
1956	The Maverick Queen	Jamie	
1956	The First Texan	Henry Delaney	
1956	Johnny Concho	Albert Dark	
1956	Thunder Over Arizona	Hal Stiles	
1956	Stagecoach to Fury	Judge Lester Farrell	
1956	The Rainmaker	Sheriff Howard Thomas	
1958	Twilight for the Gods	Old Brown	
1958	The Matchmaker	Malachi Stack	
1958	The Last Hurrah	Charles J. Hennessey	
1959	Warlock	Judge Holloway	
1960	Tess of the Storm Country	Fred Thorson	
1965	A Patch of Blue	Ole Pa	

=== Partial television ===
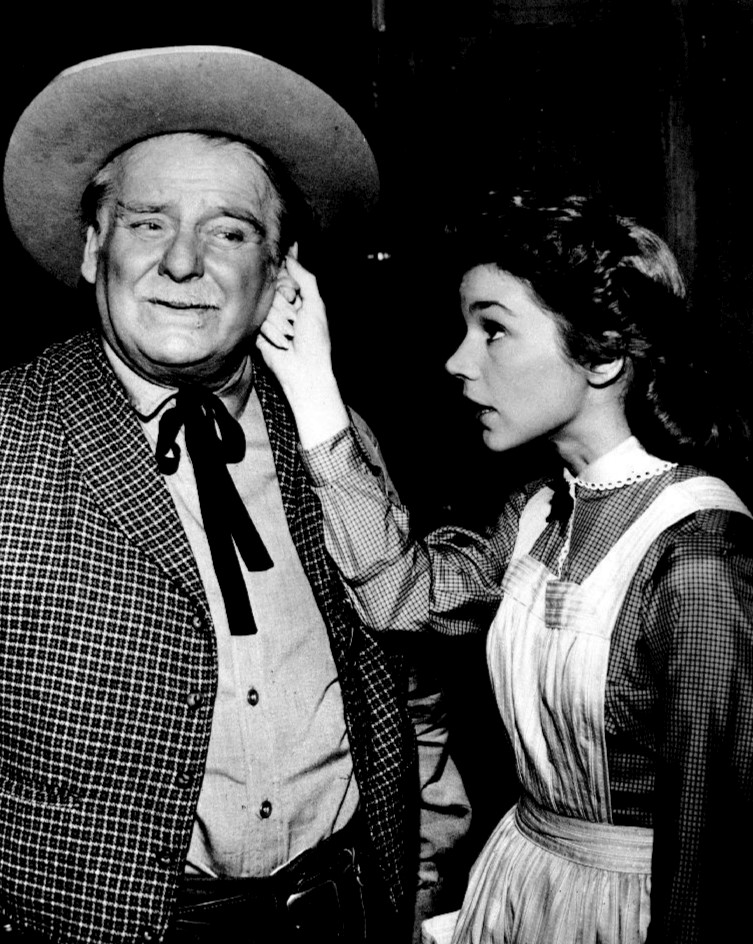
Wallace Ford with Betty Lou Keim in NBC-TV's The Deputy (1959–61)

Year	Title	Role	Notes
1953	The Motorola Television Hour		"Outlaw's Reckoning" (series debut)
1953	Goodyear Television Playhouse		"The Happy Rest"
1953	Armstrong Circle Theatre		"The Marshal of Misery Gulch"
1954	Father Knows Best	Nick	"The Christmas Story”
1954	Inner Sanctum	Photographer	"Dark of the Night"
1955	Ford Theatre	Talker	"Sunday Mourn"
1955	Damon Runyon Theatre	Lt. Harrigan	"Tobias the Terrible"
1957	The Court of Last Resort	William Markham	"The Jim Thompson Case"
1958	Playhouse 90	Mule Rogers	"The Last Man"
1959–1961	The Deputy	Marshal Herk Lamson	
1960	Tales of Wells Fargo	Marshal F.X. Murphy	"Dead Man's Street"
1964	The Andy Griffith Show	Roger Hanover	
