= Charles Langbridge Morgan =

British playwright and novelist (1894–1958)

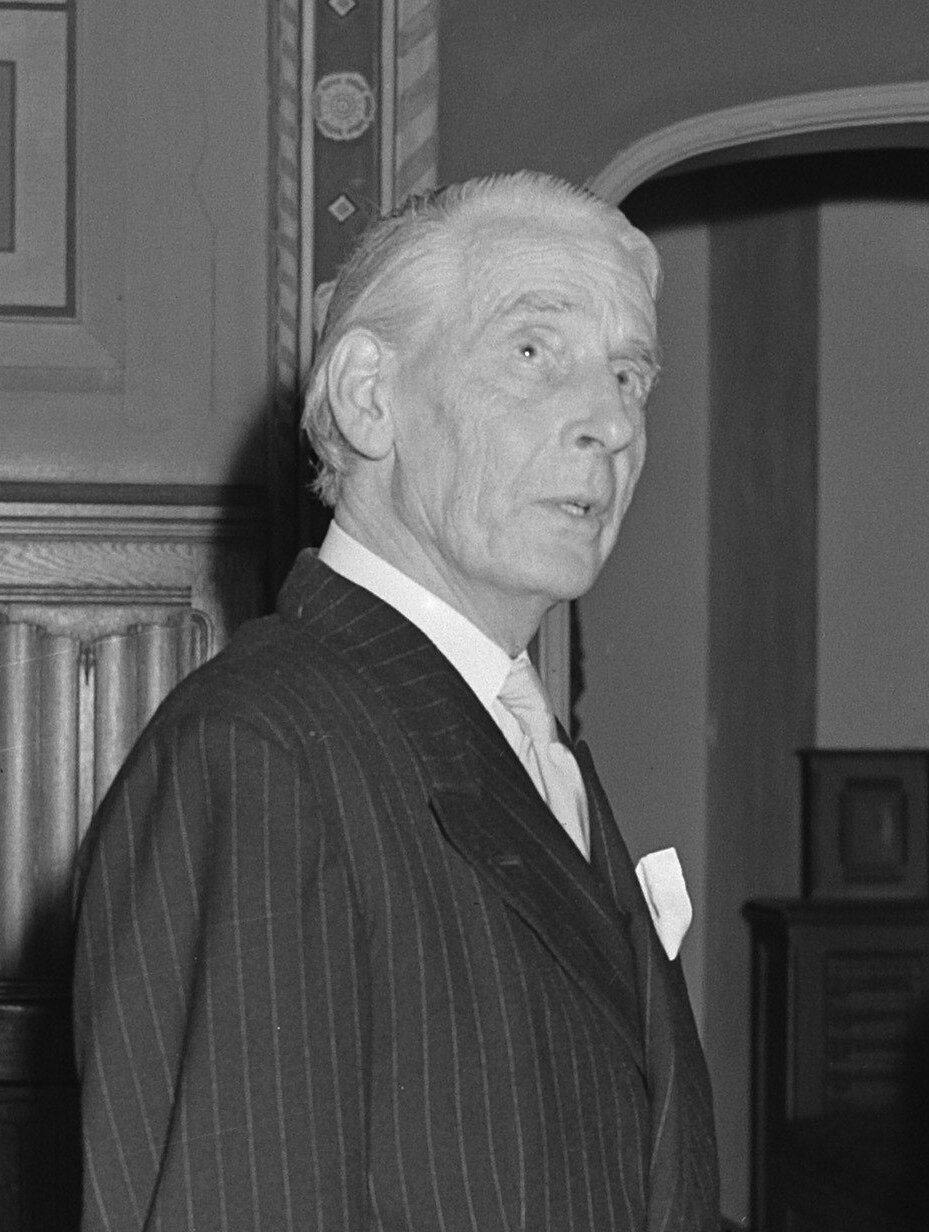
- Morgan in 1954
- Born: 22 January 1894
- Died: February 6, 1958 (aged 64)
- Occupations: Playwright, novelist
- Spouse: Hilda Vaughan
- Relatives: Charles Langbridge Morgan (father)

Charles Langbridge Morgan (22 January 1894 – 6 February 1958) was a British playwright and novelist of English and Welsh parentage. The main themes of his work were, as he himself put it, "Art, Love, and Death", and the relation between them. Themes of individual novels range from the paradoxes of freedom (The Voyage, The River Line), through passionate love seen from within (Portrait in a Mirror) and without (A Breeze of Morning), to the conflict of good and evil (The Judge's Story) and the enchanted boundary of death (Sparkenbroke). He was married to Welsh novelist Hilda Vaughan.

== Life and writings ==
=== Early life ===
His maternal grandparents had emigrated to Australia from Pembrokeshire. His paternal grandparents were from Gloucestershire and Devon in England. His parents were married in Australia. His father, Sir Charles Langbridge Morgan, was a railway civil engineer, and at one time was President of the Institution of Civil Engineers. Morgan himself was born in Bromley, Kent. He was educated at the Naval Colleges of Osborne and Dartmouth and served as a midshipman in the China Fleet until 1913 when he returned to England to take the entrance examinations for Oxford. On the outbreak of war, he rejoined the navy but was sent with Churchill's Naval Division to the defence of Antwerp. He was interned in the Netherlands which provided the setting for his best-selling novel The Fountain.

Some of his early poems were published in The Westminster Gazette. "To America" (1917) was included in A Treasury of World Poetry, edited by George Herbert Clarke. After World War I, he took his degree at Brasenose College, Oxford.

=== Family relationships; journalism and drama ===
After an unsuccessful relationship with Mary, a daughter of Alfred Mond, 1st Baron Melchett, he married the Welsh novelist Hilda Vaughan in 1923. They had two children: Dame Shirley Paget, Marchioness of Anglesey, and Roger Morgan, who became Librarian of the House of Lords Library. He was the drama critic of The Times from the 1920s until 1938, and contributed weekly articles on the London theatre to The New York Times. He wrote a series of articles for The Times Literary Supplement under the byline "Menander's Mirror" from 1942, and many articles for The Sunday Times.

His first play, The Flashing Stream (1938), had successful runs in London and Paris but was not well received in New York. The River Line (1952) was originally written as a novel in 1949 and concerned the activities of escaped British prisoners of war in France during World War II.

=== Honours and reputation ===
He was awarded the French Légion d'honneur in 1936, a promotion in 1945, and was elected a member of the Institut de France in 1949. In 1948, he was shortlisted for the Nobel Prize in Literature. From 1953 to 1956, he was the President of PEN International, the worldwide association of writers.

While Morgan enjoyed an immense reputation during his lifetime, particularly in France, and was awarded the 1940 James Tait Black Memorial Prize for fiction, he was sometimes criticised for excessive seriousness, and for some time he was rather neglected; he once claimed that the "sense of humour by which we are ruled avoids emotion and vision and grandeur of spirit as a weevil avoids the sun. It has banished tragedy from our theatre, eloquence from our debates, glory from our years of peace, splendour from our wars…" The character Gerard Challis in Stella Gibbons's Westwood is thought to be a caricature of him. His posthumous reputation was initially higher in France than in Britain, but has begun a new rise in recent years with the republication of various novels (including Capuchin Classics' The Voyage with an Introduction by Oxford's Valentine Cunningham in 2009), his poetry (edited by Peter Holland for Scarthin Books in 2008) and an edition of his plays published by Oberon Books in 2013. He was a consummate and committed stylist, from newspaper reviews to major novels a passionate craftsman of English prose. He was also very popular in Italy, especially in the 1950s. He spent long periods in the North, and in Tuscany. He wrote and set Sparkenbroke in Lucca.

=== Literary connection ===
Morgan employed Esmé Valerie Fletcher as his private secretary when she moved to London from Leeds in her determination to enter London literary circles and find a way to meet T. S. Eliot, her future husband. She acknowledged her gratitude to Morgan for providing her with her first opportunity and later spoke of her respect for him as an author in private discussions with her family and friends.

== Major works ==
=== Novels ===
- The Gunroom (1919)
- My Name is Legion (1925)
- Portrait in a Mirror (1929)
- The Fountain (1932)
- Sparkenbroke (1936)
- The Voyage (1940)
- The Empty Room (1941)
- The Judge's Story (1947)
- The River Line (1949)
- A Breeze of Morning (1951)
- Challenge to Venus (1957)

=== Plays ===
- The Flashing Stream (1938)
- The River Line (1952)
- The Burning Glass (1953)

=== Essays ===
- Epitaph on George Moore (1935)
- The House of Macmillan: (1843–1943) (1943)
- Reflections in a Mirror (in two volumes 1944, 1946)
- Liberties of the Mind (1951)
- The Writer and his World (1960)
- Dramatic Critic: selected reviews (1922–1939), selected and edited by Roger Morgan (Oberon Books 2013)

=== Poetry ===
- Ode to France (1942)
- The Collected Poems of Charles Morgan (2008)

== Secondary titles ==
- De Pange, Victor, Morgan, Classiques du XXe siècle (Paris: Editions universitaires, 1962)
- Duffin, Henry Charles, The Novels and Plays of Charles Morgan. (London: Bowes and Bowes, 1959)
- Lewis, Eiluned (ed.), Selected Letters of Charles Morgan (London/Melbourne: Macmillan, 1967)
- Jackson, Nigel, The Seed That Falls: the Eleven Novels of Charles Morgan (Melbourne: Nigel Jackson, 2018)

Non-profit organization positions
Preceded by Benedetto Croce	International President of PEN International; 1953–1956	Succeeded by André Chamson
