= Not Quite Decent =

1929 film by Irving Cummings

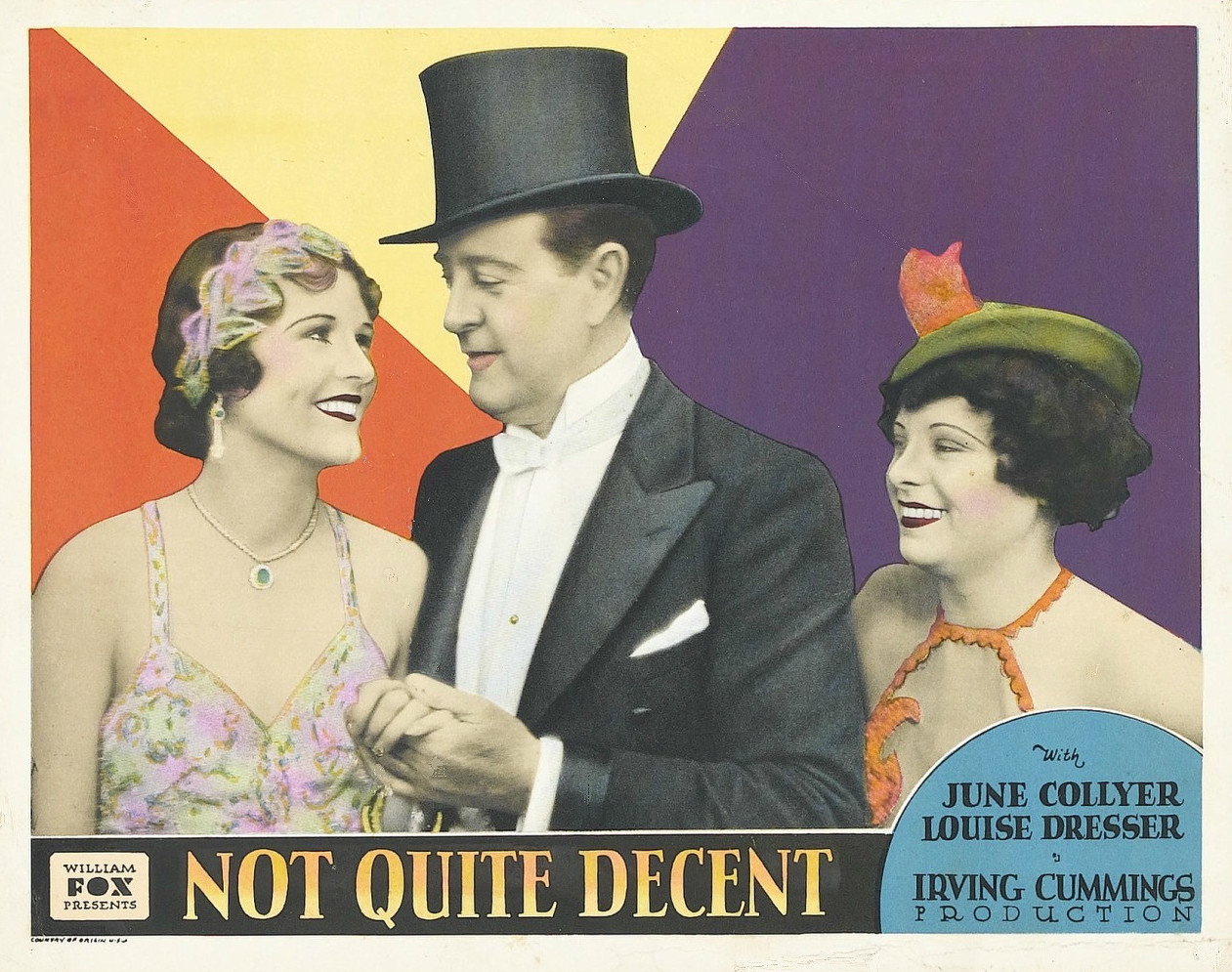
- Lobby card
- Directed by: Irving Cummings
- Written by: Marion Orth (writer); Edwin J. Burke (dialogue); Malcolm Stuart Boylan (intertitles)
- Story by: Wallace Smith
- Produced by: James Kevin McGuinness
- Starring: Louise Dresser; June Collyer
- Cinematography: Charles G. Clarke
- Edited by: Paul Weatherwax
- Music by: S. L. Rothafel
- Distributed by: Fox Film Corporation
- Release date: April 7, 1929
- Running time: 58 minutes (6 reels)
- Country: United States
- Languages: Sound (Part-Talkie); English Intertitles

Not Quite Decent is a 1929 American sound part-talkie Pre-Code drama film, produced and distributed by Fox Film Corporation, directed by Irving Cummings, and starring June Collyer and Louise Dresser. In addition to sequences with audible dialogue or talking sequences, the film features a synchronized musical score and sound effects along with English intertitles. The soundtrack was recorded using the Movietone sound-on-film system.

== Plot ==
On her way to New York for her first stage appearance, Linda Cunningham meets Mame Jarrow, a nightclub singer; Linda later drops by to hear Mame sing, accompanied by their angel, Paul Nicholson, a wealthy roué. Mame gradually comes to realize that Linda is her own daughter, from whom she was separated years before by pious relatives. Using all her wiles, Mame attempts to keep Linda from falling prey to Nicholson, and when all else fails, she sends for Jerry Connor, Linda's small town sweetheart. Linda returns home with Jerry, and Mame sings her heart out in smoky rooms, never disclosing to Linda that she is her mother.

== Cast ==
- June Collyer as Linda Cunningham
- Louise Dresser as Mame Jarrow
- Allan Lane as Jerry Connor
- Marjorie Beebe as Margie
- Oscar Apfel as Canfield
- Ben Hewlett as a Crook
- Jack Kenny as Another Crook
- Paul Nicholson as Al Bergon

== Music ==
The film features a theme song entitled "Empty Arms" with words and music by Con Conrad, Archie Gottler and Sidney D. Mitchell.

== Preservation status ==
With no known prints in any archives, Not Quite Decent is now considered to be a lost film.

== See also ==
- List of lost films
- List of early sound feature films (1926–1929)
- 1937 Fox vault fire
