= Viva Villa! (book) =

Book by Edgcumb Pinchon

Viva Villa! A Recovery of the Real Pancho Villa, Peon, Bandit, Soldier, Patriot
- Title page for Viva Villa! A Recovery of the Real Pancho Villa, Peon, Bandit, Soldier, Patriot (1933)
- Author: Edgcumb Pinchon
- Language: English
- Subject: Biography
- Genre: Non-fiction
- Publisher: Harcourt, Brace and Company
- Publication date: 1933
- Publication place: United States
- Media type: Print (hardcover)
- Pages: 383
- ISBN: 0-405-02045-7

Viva Villa! A Recovery of the Real Pancho Villa, Peon, Bandit, Soldier, Patriot is a 1933 biography of Mexican revolutionary leader Pancho Villa, authored by Edgcumb Pinchon with research assistance from O. B. Stade. The book presents a detailed account of Villa's life, portraying him as a multifaceted figure: peon, bandit, soldier, and patriot.

== Background ==
Edgcumb Pinchon, an American journalist and author, collaborated with O. B. Stade, who had firsthand experience with Villa during the Mexican Revolution. Stade's insights and experiences provided valuable context and authenticity to the narrative.

== Publication and Reception ==
The book was published in 1933 by Harcourt, Brace and Company. It was well-received for its vivid portrayal of Villa and its detailed account of the Mexican Revolution. The collaboration between Pinchon and Stade was noted for bringing a unique perspective to Villa's life story.

== Film Adaptation ==
In 1934, Metro-Goldwyn-Mayer released the film Viva Villa!, directed by Jack Conway and starring Wallace Beery as Pancho Villa. The screenplay, written by Ben Hecht, was based on Pinchon's biography. The film marked the second time Wallace Beery had played Villa in a motion picture.

== Editions ==
- New York, Harcourt, Brace and company [c1933]. (o.p.)
- New York, Arno Press, 1970 [c1933]. ISBN 0-405-02045-7
