= Odo Stade =

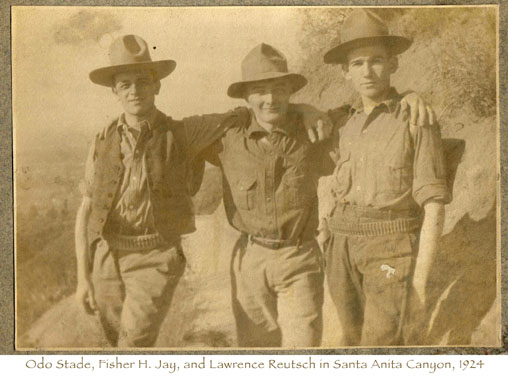
- O. B. Stade (left) in Santa Anita Canyon 1924
- Born: Odo Max Bernhard Stade; July 2, 1892; Alsace-Lorraine, German Empire
- Died: March 5, 1976 (aged 83); Fontana, California, U.S.
- Occupations: Diplomat, author, actor, forest ranger
- Known for: Collaboration with Pancho Villa, co-authoring Viva Villa!

Odo (Otto) Max Bernhard Stade (July 2, 1892 – March 5, 1976), frequently known as O. B. Stade, was a German-American diplomat, author, actor, and forest ranger. He is best known for his collaboration with Mexican revolutionary Pancho Villa and for co-authoring the biography Viva Villa!.

== Early life ==
Stade was born in Alsace-Lorraine, then part of the German Empire. He later immigrated to the United States, settling in Southern California, where he pursued a diverse array of careers.

== Career ==
=== Diplomatic and military involvement ===
In the early 1910s, Stade served as a chargé d'affaires in Mexico. During the Mexican Revolution, he became involved with Pancho Villa, serving as Villa's liaison to the United States. Stade also assisted in developing Villa's air force, one of the earliest examples of military aviation.

=== Acting career ===
Following his involvement in Mexico, Stade pursued acting and stunt piloting in the American and German silent film industries. His film credits included Blind Husband, Miracle Man, World and Its Woman, and The Right to Happiness.

=== Bookstore ownership ===
After managing the notable Vroman's Bookstore in Pasadena, California, Stade established his own bookstore in Hollywood during the 1920s and 1930s. His store became a gathering place for intellectuals and artists of the era.

=== Surveying and military consultation ===
In later years, Stade worked as a forest ranger in the San Gabriel Mountains, based at the ranger station in Glendora. He was instrumental in surveying mountain peaks and selecting the site for a Nike missile facility positioned above Pasadena.

== Legacy ==
Odo B. Stade's varied career and contributions significantly impacted several fields. His firsthand experiences with Pancho Villa provided historians and readers unique insights into the Mexican Revolution. His pioneering efforts in military aviation during the early 20th century have also been noted for their historical significance.
