= Marian Shockley =

American actress

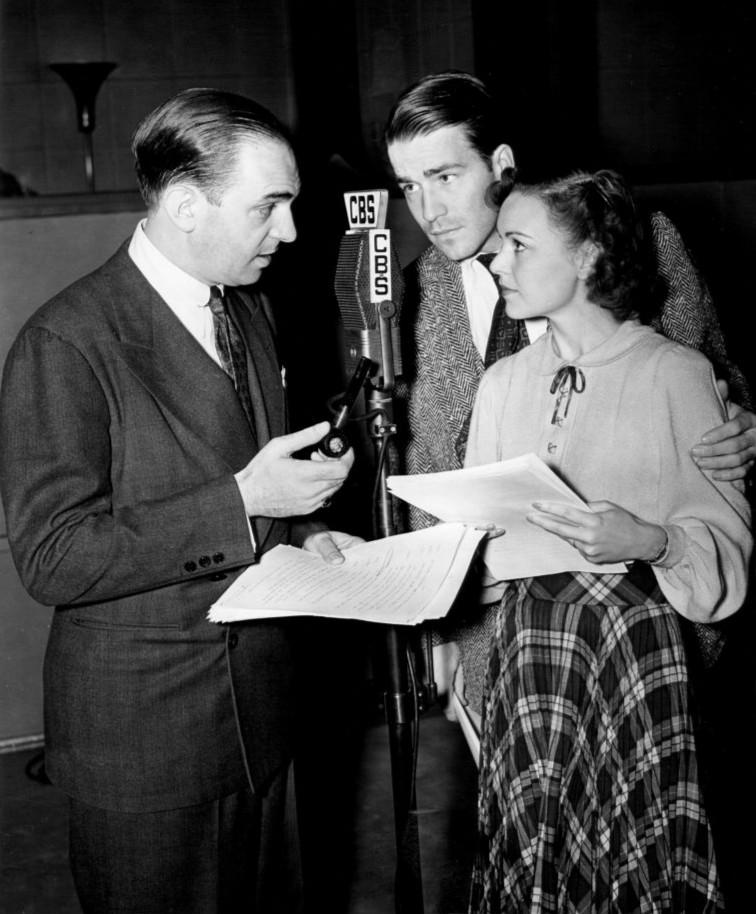
- Shockley (right) with Santos Ortega and Hugh Marlowe in The Adventures of Ellery Queen, 1939.
- Born: October 10, 1908; Kansas City, Missouri, U.S.
- Died: December 14, 1981 (aged 73); Los Angeles, California, U.S.
- Other names: Marian Shockley Collyer; Marion Shockley
- Education: University of Missouri
- Spouse: Bud Collyer (m. 1947; died 1969)
- Relatives: June Collyer (sister-in-law); Stuart Erwin (brother-in-law)

Marian Shockley (also Marian Shockley Collyer) (October 10, 1908 – December 14, 1981) was an American film actress of the 1930s.

== Early years ==
Born in Kansas City, Missouri, Marian Shockley (sometimes known as Marion Shockley) attended the University of Missouri with plans to teach history. However, her experiences with the Theatre Guild and in stock theater turned her attention to acting. Performing with a stock company in Denver resulted in her going to New York and being an understudy for Ina Claire.

== Career ==
Shockley was selected as a WAMPAS Baby Star in 1932, alongside Ginger Rogers and Gloria Stuart, among others. From 1930 to 1934 she starred in nineteen films, all B-movies, including the 1931 western Near the Trails End opposite Bob Steele, and, that same year, Heroes of the Flames starring opposite Tim McCoy.

Shockley continued auditioning for parts, receiving only one between 1934 and 1943. She played a small role in Stage Door Canteen (1943). She would have a couple of television roles following that.

Shockley's Broadway credits include Censored (1938), Abie's Irish Rose (1936), and Dear Old Darling (1935).

On radio, Shockley was the first person to play Nikki Porter, Ellery Queen's secretary, in The Adventures of Ellery Queen, filling that role from 1939 to 1944. In 1939, she married the program's producer-director, George Zachary. She also portrayed Carol Brent on Road of Life.

== Personal life ==
Shockley retired from acting in 1955. She was the sister-in-law of Stuart Erwin and actress June Collyer. She was married to Gordon Barry Thomson from 1934 to 1938, George Zachary from 1939 to ca. 1945, and actor and game show host Bud Collyer from 1946 until his death in 1969. Collyer had three children from a previous marriage. Shockley died in 1981, aged 73.
