= The Stu Erwin Show =

American sitcom

- Also known as: Trouble with Father
- Genre: Sitcom
- Written by: Arnold Belgard; Erna Lazarus; Lee Loeb; Al Martin; Lester Pine; Edward E. Seabrook
- Directed by: Charles Barton; Howard Bretherton; Frank R. Strayer; James Tinling
- Starring: Stuart Erwin; June Collyer; Ann Todd; Sheila James; Willie Best
- Theme music composer: Alexander Laszlo
- Opening theme: "A Family Story"
- Country of origin: United States
- Original language: English
- No. of seasons: 4
- No. of episodes: 130

Production
- Executive producer: Roland D. Reed
- Producers: Roland D. Reed; Hal Roach, Jr.
- Cinematography: Lucien Andriot; Walter Strenge; Lothrop B. Worth
- Camera setup: Single-camera setup
- Running time: 26 min
- Production companies: Hal Roach Studios; Roland D. Reed Productions Inc.

Original release
- Network: ABC
- Release: October 21, 1950 – April 13, 1955

The Stu Erwin Show (also known as Trouble with Father) is an American sitcom which aired on ABC from 1950 to 1955. Only four of the series’ five seasons on the network included new episodes; the 1953–54 season consisted entirely of reruns.

== Synopsis ==
The series' star, Stuart Erwin, played a bumbling high school principal named Stu Erwin. His wife, film ingenue from the late silent and early sound period, June Collyer, played the principal's wife, June Erwin. Although Erwin and Collyer, who were married in 1931, had a son and a daughter, the series presented them as parents of two adolescent daughters played by Sheila James and Ann Todd who was replaced by Merry Anders in the series' final season. One notable aspect of the show was that it featured black actor Willie Best in a regular supporting role.

Predating modern single-camera sitcoms, The Stu Erwin Show originally aired without a laugh track (one was added in its final season), and each episode was around 26 minutes long, without commercials. During its original network run on ABC, it was sponsored by General Mills (1950–54), Paper Mate (1953-'54) and Liggett & Myers (1954–55).

== Production ==
The series was produced by Roland D. Reed and Hal Roach, Jr., and filmed at Hal Roach Studios in Culver City, California. All 52 episodes of season one were first-run, followed by another 26 in season two for a total of 78 straight weeks of all-new shows before reruns began in the spring of 1952. Another 26 episodes were produced for the 1952–53 season, interspersed with reruns every third week between October 1952 and July 1953. Production then went on a lengthy hiatus while the network continued airing reruns from the summer of 1953 until the fall of 1954. The fourth and final season's 26 episodes aired between October 1954 and April 1955.

== Episodes ==
=== Season 1 (1950–51) ===
No. overall	No. in season	Title	Directed by	Written by	Original release date
1	1	"Mr. Lamont Stays All Night"	Howard Bretherton	Charles Shows	October 21, 1950
2	2	"The Contest"	Howard Bretherton	Story by : Charles Shows, Teleplay by : Arnold Belgard	October 28, 1950
3	3	"Stu's Holiday"	Howard Bretherton	Story by : Charles Shows, Teleplay by : Arnold Belgard	November 4, 1950
4	4	"Dr. I.Q. Erwin"	Howard Bretherton	Story by : Charles Shows, Teleplay by : Les Pine & Oliver Crawford	November 11, 1950
5	5	"Father Finds a Genius" "Father Finds a Junior"	Unknown	Charles Shows	November 18, 1950
6	6	"Father's Little Gift"	Unknown	Charles Shows	November 25, 1950
7	7	"June's Romance" "The Poison Story"	Unknown	Charles Shows	December 2, 1950
8	8	"Thank You, Mr. Jarvis"	Howard Bretherton	Charles Shows & Warren Wilson	December 9, 1950
9	9	"Father Gets Into the Act"	Frank R. Strayer	Story by : Charles Shows, Teleplay by : Fred Shevin	December 16, 1950
10	10	"Problem Party" "Spooks"	Howard Bretherton	Arthur Hoerl	December 23, 1950
11	11	"Lesson in Tolerance"	Unknown	Charles Shows	December 30, 1950
12	12	"Father Knows Best"	Unknown	Charles Shows	January 6, 1951
13	13	"Competition"	Unknown	Charles Shows	January 13, 1951
14	14	"The Ugly Duckling"	Unknown	Charles Shows	January 20, 1951
15	15	"Telephonitis"	Howard Bretherton	Story by : Charles Shows, Teleplay by : Arnold Belgard	January 27, 1951
16	16	"Bugle Sounds"	Unknown	Charles Shows	February 3, 1951
17	17	"What Paper Do You Read?"	Howard Bretherton	Story by : Charles Shows, Teleplay by : Nathaniel Curtis	February 10, 1951
18	18	"Hot Rod"	Unknown	Charles Shows	February 17, 1951
19	19	"Cousin Steve Pays a Visit"	Unknown	Charles Shows	February 24, 1951
20	20	"High Finance"	Howard Bretherton	Charles Shows	March 3, 1951
21	21	"The Helping Hand"	Unknown	Charles Shows	March 10, 1951
22	22	"Wedding Bells"	Howard Bretherton	Arnold Belgard & Charles Shows	March 17, 1951
23	23	"Black Saturday"	Frank R. Strayer	Lee Loeb & Charles Shows	March 24, 1951
24	24	"Father and Shakespeare"	Unknown	Story by : Charles Shows; Teleplay by : Nathaniel Curtis	March 31, 1951
25	25	"Stu's Private Eye"	Unknown	Charles Shows	April 7, 1951
26	26	"Class Reunion"	Unknown	Charles Shows	April 14, 1951
27	27	"Erwin Goes to the Dogs" "Stu Goes to the Dogs"	Unknown	Charles Shows	April 21, 1951
28	28	"Interior Decorating"	Unknown	Charles Shows	April 28, 1951
29	29	"Milk of Human Kindness"	Unknown	Charles Shows	May 5, 1951
30	30	"Baby Knows Best"	Unknown	Charles Shows	May 12, 1951
31	31	"Weighty Problem"	Unknown	Charles Shows	May 19, 1951
32	32	"Father Picks a Queen"	Howard Bretherton	Erna Lazarus	May 26, 1951
33	33	"The Great Debate"	Howard Bretherton	Oliver Crawford & Charles Shows	June 2, 1951
34	34	"The Burglar Alarm"	Howard Bretherton	Lee Loeb & Charles Shows	June 9, 1951
35	35	"Many Happy Returns"	Howard Bretherton	Lee Loeb	June 16, 1951
36	36	"The Present"	Unknown	Charles Shows	June 23, 1951
37	37	"Private Enterprise"	James Tinling	Charles Shows	June 30, 1951
38	38	"TV Comes to the Erwins" "To Buy or Not to Buy a TV"	Howard Bretherton	Charles Shows	July 7, 1951
39	39	"Springtime for Father"	Howard Bretherton	Story by : Charles Shows, Teleplay by : Charles S. Belden	July 14, 1951
40	40	"Doctor's Examination"	Howard Bretherton	Lee Loeb	July 21, 1951
41	41	"Barbecue"	Howard Bretherton	Story by : Charles Shows, Teleplay by : Arthur Hoerl	July 28, 1951
42	42	"Quarantine"	Howard Bretherton	Lee Loeb & Charles Shows	August 4, 1951
43	43	"Dear Dora"	Howard Bretherton	Charles Shows	August 11, 1951
44	44	"June Serves on a Jury"	Unknown	Charles Shows	August 18, 1951
45	45	"Nothing But the Truth"	James Tinling	Story by : Charles Shows, Teleplay by : Al Martin	August 25, 1951
46	46	"Roughing It"	Howard Bretherton	Story by : Charles Shows, Teleplay by : Warren Wilson	September 1, 1951
47	47	"Cafe Society"	Unknown	Charles Shows	September 8, 1951
48	48	"I Spy"	Unknown	Charles Shows	September 15, 1951
49	49	"Track Meet"	Unknown	Charles Shows	September 22, 1951
50	50	"That's My Mother"	Unknown	Charles Shows	September 29, 1951
51	51	"The Pen Is Mightier"	Howard Bretherton	Al Martin & Charles Shows	October 6, 1951
52	52	"It's Just Money"	Howard Bretherton	Al Martin	October 13, 1951

=== Season 2 (1951–52) ===
No. overall	No. in season	Title	Directed by	Written by	Original release date
53	1	"Hate the Love Seat"	Howard Bretherton	Erna Lazarus	October 19, 1951
54	2	"The Bonus"	Howard Bretherton	Al Martin	October 26, 1951
55	3	"Nice Little Doggie"	James Tinling	Lee Loeb	November 2, 1951
56	4	"The French Teacher"	Unknown	Unknown	November 9, 1951
57	5	"Erwin for President"	Unknown	Unknown	November 16, 1951
58	6	"Father Does His Homework"	Howard Bretherton	M. Randall & R. Stewart	November 23, 1951
59	7	"In a Pickle"	James Tinling	Al Martin	November 30, 1951
60	8	"Jackie Knows All"	Howard Bretherton	Lee Loeb	December 7, 1951
61	9	"The Big Game"	Howard Bretherton	Arnold Belgard	December 14, 1951
62	10	"Tempest in a Teapot"	Unknown	Unknown	December 21, 1951
63	11	"Egg Noggin'"	James Tinling	Charles S. Belden	December 28, 1951
64	12	"Stu Has a Baby"	Howard Bretherton	Unknown	January 4, 1952
65	13	"Joyce's Romance"	Unknown	Unknown	January 11, 1952
66	14	"Brown Eyes"	Unknown	Unknown	January 18, 1952
67	15	"Love Bug"	Howard Bretherton	Arnold Belgard	January 25, 1952
68	16	"The Business"	Howard Bretherton	Al Martin	February 1, 1952
69	17	"Premature Engagement"	Unknown	Unknown	February 8, 1952
70	18	"Jackie Writes a Book"	Unknown	Unknown	February 15, 1952
71	19	"A Very Rainy Day"	Howard Bretherton	Lee Loeb	February 22, 1952
72	20	"Quiet Place" "Quiet Please"	Howard Bretherton	Charles Belden	February 29, 1952
73	21	"Trouble Below"	Unknown	Unknown	March 7, 1952
74	22	"A Party Comes to Life"	Howard Bretherton	Arthur Hoerl	March 14, 1952
75	23	"Runaway"	Unknown	Unknown	March 21, 1952
76	24	"Boys Aren't Everything"	Unknown	Unknown	March 28, 1952
77	25	"Stu Paints the Roof"	Unknown	Unknown	April 4, 1952
78	26	"On the Trail"	Unknown	Unknown	April 11, 1952

=== Season 3 (1952–53) ===
No. overall	No. in season	Title	Directed by	Written by	Original release date
79	1	"Jackie Finds a Cause"	Howard Bretherton	Erna Lazarus	October 17, 1952
80	2	"Object Lesson"	Unknown	Unknown	October 24, 1952
81	3	"Goin' Steady"	Unknown	Unknown	November 7, 1952
82	4	"Fur Coat"	Unknown	Unknown	November 14, 1952
83	5	"Father Takes a Pet"	Howard Bretherton	Roy Stewart & Margaret Randall	November 28, 1952
84	6	"The Game" "The Contest"	Unknown	Unknown	December 5, 1952
85	7	"The Golden Key"	Howard Bretherton	Eve Greene	December 19, 1952
86	8	"Stu's Jalopy"	Unknown	Unknown	December 26, 1952
87	9	"The Blow-Up" "The Big Blow-Up"	Unknown	Unknown	January 9, 1953
88	10	"Leave It to Stu"	Howard Bretherton	Al Martin	January 16, 1953
89	11	"Stu's Secret"	Unknown	Unknown	January 30, 1953
90	12	"Fair Exchange"	Howard Bretherton	Al Martin	February 6, 1953
91	13	"Stu Sells the House"	Unknown	Unknown	February 20, 1953
92	14	"In the Shade of the Old Family Tree"	Howard Bretherton	Erna Lazarus	February 27, 1953
93	15	"Art Appreciation"	Unknown	Unknown	March 13, 1953
94	16	"Operation Hamster"	Unknown	Unknown	March 20, 1953
95	17	"Youth, It's Wonderful"	Howard Bretherton	Roy Stewart & Margaret Randall	April 3, 1953
96	18	"Jackie's Newspaper"	Howard Bretherton	Lee Loeb	April 10, 1953
97	19	"The Landlord"	Howard Bretherton	Warren Wilson	April 24, 1953
98	20	"Yvette"	Unknown	Unknown	May 1, 1953
99	21	"Nothing Like a Friend"	Unknown	Unknown	May 15, 1953
100	22	"Farewell to Hamilton High"	Unknown	Unknown	May 22, 1953
101	23	"Love Thy Neighbor"	Unknown	Unknown	June 5, 1953
102	24	"The Day the Circus Came to Town"	Unknown	Unknown	June 12, 1953
103	25	"All for Father"	Unknown	Unknown	June 26, 1953
104	26	"The Three Budgeteers"	Unknown	Unknown	July 3, 1953

=== Season 4 (1954–55) ===
No. overall	No. in season	Title	Directed by	Written by	Original release date
105	1	"Jackie's First Date"	Howard Bretherton	William E. Raynor & Herbert F. Margolis	October 20, 1954
106	2	"Father's Financier"	Unknown	Unknown	October 27, 1954
107	3	"Puppy Love"	Unknown	Edward E. Seabrook & Homer McCoy	November 3, 1954
108	4	"Father's Big Chance"	Unknown	Unknown	November 10, 1954
109	5	"Right About Face"	Unknown	Eve Greene	November 17, 1954
110	6	"Father's Boy"	Unknown	Edward E. Seabrook & Homer McCoy	November 24, 1954
111	7	"Fleetwing"	Unknown	John Tucker Battle	December 1, 1954
112	8	"Soft Touch"	Unknown	Unknown	December 8, 1954
113	9	"The Wedding Bouquet"	Unknown	Wanda Tuchock	December 15, 1954
114	10	"Lohengrin Blues"	Unknown	Frank Gill Jr. & G. Carleton Brown	December 22, 1954
115	11	"The Honeymooners"	Unknown	William E. Raynor & Herbert F. Margolis	December 29, 1954
116	12	"The Uninvited Guests"	Unknown	Unknown	January 5, 1955
117	13	"One of the Boys"	Howard Bretherton	William E. Raynor & Herbert F. Margolis	January 12, 1955
118	14	"Down on the Farm"	Unknown	Unknown	January 19, 1955
119	15	"Father Becomes Efficient"	Unknown	William E. Raynor & Herbert F. Margolis	January 26, 1955
120	16	"Interfering In-Laws"	Unknown	William E. Raynor & Herbert F. Margolis	February 2, 1955
121	17	"The First Fight"	Unknown	Nathaniel Curtis	February 9, 1955
122	18	"Two-Car Family"	Unknown	Unknown	February 16, 1955
123	19	"The Helping Heart"	Unknown	Unknown	February 23, 1955
124	20	"The French Influence"	Charles Barton	Warren Wilson	March 2, 1955
125	21	"Women Drivers"	Unknown	Unknown	March 9, 1955
126	22	"A Job for Jimmy"	Charles Barton	Unknown	March 16, 1955
127	23	"Separate Vacations"	Unknown	Unknown	March 23, 1955
128	24	"Pecans vs. Pistachio"	Unknown	Wanda Tuchock	March 30, 1955
129	25	"The Pearl Necklace"	Howard Bretherton	Roy Stewart & Margaret Randall	April 6, 1955
130	26	"The Matchmakers"	Unknown	Unknown	April 13, 1955

== Syndication and Home release ==
The series was widely syndicated by Official Films through the late 1960s. The show is currently seen on the Retro TV Network as of July 2018.

Many episodes of the program have fallen into the public domain. As such, various budget DVD releases of public domain episodes have been released.
