= East Side, West Side (1927 film) =

1927 film by Allan Dwan

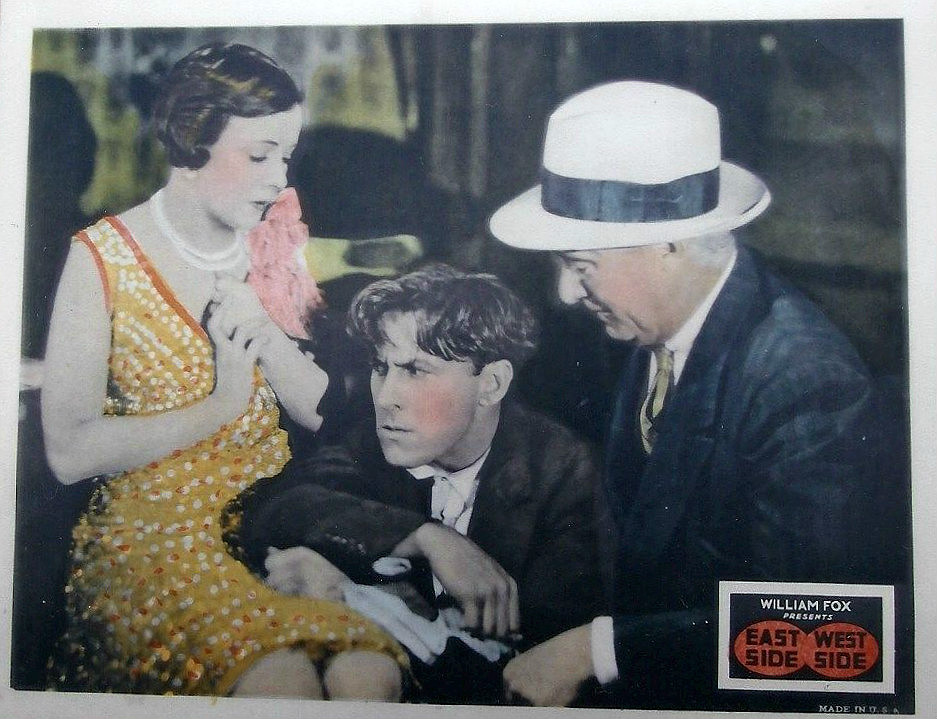
- Lobby card
- Directed by: Allan Dwan
- Written by: Allan Dwan (scenario)
- Based on: East Side, West Side; 1927 novel by Felix Riesenberg
- Produced by: William Fox
- Starring: George O'Brien; Virginia Valli
- Cinematography: George Webber
- Distributed by: Fox Film Corporation
- Release date: October 9, 1927
- Running time: 90 minutes
- Country: United States
- Language: Silent (English intertitles)

East Side, West Side is a 1927 American silent drama film directed by Allan Dwan and starring George O'Brien (in the same year that he played the lead in F.W. Murnau's Sunrise: A Song of Two Humans), Virginia Valli, and June Collyer. The supporting cast includes J. Farrell MacDonald and Holmes Herbert. The epic film was shot extensively on various locations in New York City and includes a sinking ship loosely based upon the RMS Titanic.

The film is preserved at the Museum of Modern Art, New York.

East Side, West Side (full film)

The film was remade in 1931 as Skyline with Thomas Meighan and Hardie Albright.

== Cast ==
- George O'Brien as John Breen
- Virginia Valli as Becka Lipvitch
- J. Farrell MacDonald as Pug Malone
- Dore Davidson as Channon Lipvitch
- Sonia Nodell as Mrs. Lipvitch (credited as Sonia Nodalsky)
- June Collyer as Josephine
- John Miltern as Gerrit Rantoul
- Holmes Herbert as Gilbert Van Horn
- Frank Dodge as Judge Kelly
- Dan Wolheim as Grogan
- Johnny Dooley as Grogan gang member
- John Kearney as Policeman
- Edward Garvey as Second
- Frank Allworth as Flash
- William Frederic as Breen
- Jack La Rue as dining extra (uncredited)
