= Bud Collyer =

American actor (1908–1969)

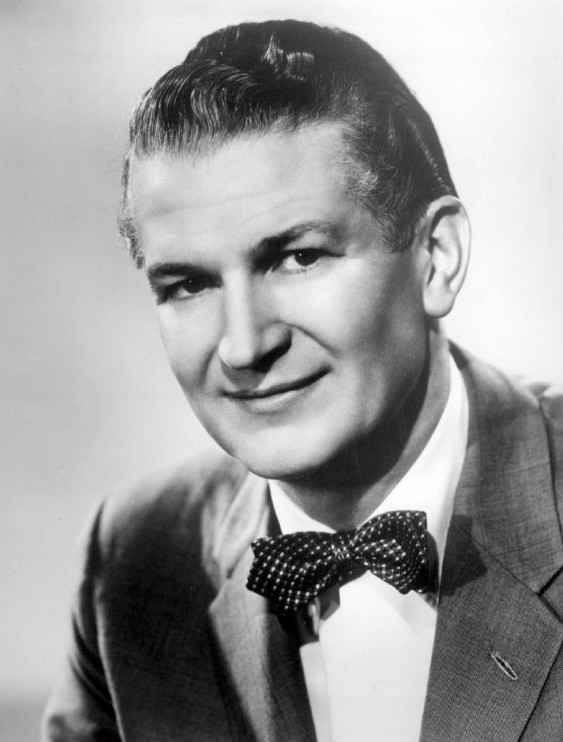
- Collyer in 1962
- Born: Clayton Johnson Heermance, Jr. June 18, 1908; New York City, U.S.
- Died: September 8, 1969 (aged 61); Greenwich, Connecticut, U.S.
- Education: Williams College
- Occupations: Radio announcer, game show host
- Years active: 1930s–1969
- Spouses: Heloise Law Green (m. 1936, divorced) Marian Shockley (m. 1947)
- Children: 3
- Relatives: June Collyer (sister); Stuart Erwin (brother-in-law)

Bud Collyer (born Clayton Johnson Heermance Jr.; June 18, 1908 – September 8, 1969) was an American radio actor, announcer and game show host who became one of the nation's first major television game show stars. He is best remembered for his work as the first host of the TV game shows Beat the Clock and To Tell the Truth, alongside the roles of Clark Kent / Superman on radio and in animated cartoons, initially in theatrical short subjects and later on television.

He also recorded a number of long-playing 33 1/3 rpm record albums for children. Some of these featured Bible stories, in keeping with his strong connections with his church and deep spirituality.

== Early life and career ==
Collyer was born in Manhattan to Clayton Johnson Heermance and Caroline Collyer. He originally sought a career in law, attending Williams College, where he was a member of Psi Upsilon fraternity, and Fordham University law school. Although he became a law clerk after his graduation, making as much in a month on radio as he did in a year of clerking convinced him to make broadcasting his career. He changed his surname, and by 1940 he had become a familiar voice on all three major radio networks.

He held starring or major supporting roles in The Man I Married (as Adam Waring); Kate Hopkins, Angel of Mercy (as Tom); Pretty Kitty Kelly (as Michael Conway); Terry and the Pirates (as Pat Ryan); Renfrew of the Mounted (as Renfrew); and Abie's Irish Rose (as Abie Levy). He also was the announcer for a number of radio soap operas, including The Guiding Light and The Goldbergs. Collyer remembered his time on Cavalcade of America.

== Superman ==
Collyer's best-remembered radio starring role began in early 1940 in The Adventures of Superman on the Mutual Broadcasting System, a role he concurrently performed in the animated Superman theatrical short films. Collyer supplied the voices of both Superman and his alter ego Clark Kent, opposite radio actress Joan Alexander as Lois Lane. Every Superman episode and animated short film featured a scene in which Clark Kent changed into his Superman costume, an effect which Collyer conveyed by dropping his voice from a high tenor to a bass register while speaking the phrase "This is (or "This looks like") a job for Superman!". Collyer later commented, "The greatest fun I ever had in radio was playing Superman for 14 years. I could be as hammy as I wanted and nobody objected."

Collyer stopped voicing Superman for the animated short films (while continuing to do the radio series) after the ninth short, because Famous Studios took over the series and wanted him to record in a New Jersey studio, something which Collyer's radio commitments in New York City made impossible.

In 1966, Collyer and Alexander reprised their roles in the Filmation animated television series The New Adventures of Superman.

== Game-show hosting ==
Collyer got his first helping of game shows when he co-hosted ABC's (the former NBC Blue network) Break the Bank with future Miss America Pageant mainstay Bert Parks; and, when he was picked to host the radio original of the Mark Goodson-Bill Todman team's first game, Winner Take All. Collyer went on to host the television versions of both shows. (Winner Take All became, in due course, the first hosting seat for another game show titan, Bill Cullen.)

=== Beat the Clock ===
In 1950, Bud Collyer got the job which genuinely made him a household name: Beat the Clock, a game show that pitted couples (usually, but not exclusively, married) against the clock in a race to perform silly (sometimes messy) tasks, which were called "problems" but could with more accuracy be called "stunts." The grand prizes for these usually came in terms of cash or home appliances. (When Monty Hall hosted the program in the 1980s, the "problems" did indeed come to be called "stunts.") Collyer hosted the show for eleven years (1950–61), and he also co-produced it for part of its run.

Collyer did an excellent job keeping the show fast-paced; he spoke quickly and brightly, and was often moving around the stage as much as the contestants. Frequently Collyer would interrupt a stunt to offer helpful advice, or demonstrate a more efficient way to win the game. One of Collyer's trademarks on the show was securing his long-tubed stage microphone in his armpit (particularly while demonstrating the basics of a stunt for his contestants). He also typically wore bow ties, and liked to point out when contestants were "bow-tie guys" like himself, though initially, through the mid-1950s, he wore straight "four-in-hand" neckties most weeks. He enjoyed meeting families of contestants, and was fond of children. He would always ask about contestants' children, and sometimes would compare the number and sexes with that of his own family. When children were brought onstage with their parents, he would take time to talk to each of them and ask them what they wanted to be when they grew up, in a manner reminiscent of his contemporary, Art Linkletter.

At the height of the show's popularity, an installment of The Honeymooners (which surfaced years later, when Jackie Gleason released the so-called "Lost Episodes") featured blustery Ralph Kramden and scatterbrained Ed Norton appearing on and playing Beat the Clock. Unlike the show's familiar parody of The $64,000 Question (The $99,000 Answer), Gleason's Beat the Clock episode used the actual show and set, complete with the familiar large 60-second clock emblazoned with sponsor Sylvania's logo, and ending with Collyer and his famous sign-off: "Next time may be your time to beat the clock."

=== To Tell the Truth ===
In 1956, Collyer became equally, if not more, familiar as the host of a new Goodson-Todman production, To Tell the Truth, on CBS. This panel show featured four celebrities questioning three challengers all claiming to be the same person. Collyer would read an affidavit from the actual contestant, and then monitor the panel's cross-examination. Because the show depended on conversation instead of physical stunts, Collyer's demeanor on To Tell the Truth was much calmer and more avuncular than his fever-pitch performances on Beat the Clock. After the celebrities voted for their choices, Collyer intoned the famous phrase, "Will the real... John Doe... please... stand up?" Collyer always employed pauses to build the suspense. Sometimes one or both impostors would pretend to stand up before the real contestant did, bringing a moment of last-minute suspense as well as a chuckle from Collyer. The sequence provided an especially riotous moment in 1962, when Collyer purred, with a particularly pronounced twinkle, "Will the real... Bob Miller... please... stand up?" Two Bob Millers, both pitchers for the newborn New York Mets, rose in response. At least once, Collyer added to his call for the real person to stand up, when blues harmonica player/singer Paul Butterfield appeared as one of three challengers: "Will the real . . . Paul Butterfield . . . stand up . . . and give us some blues?" Butterfield rose, then joined a small band onstage to play and sing his signature song, "Born in Chicago."

The show became popular enough to sustain a weekday version as well as a weekly evening version, and Collyer presided over both concurrently. Among the celebrities who served as To Tell the Truth panelists during the 14-year run of the show were Orson Bean, Kitty Carlisle, Peggy Cass, Tom Poston (the foregoing foursome was the resident panel in the weekday series), Don Ameche, Ralph Bellamy, Mimi Benzell, Polly Bergen, Johnny Carson, Peter Lind Hayes, Sally Ann Howes, Hy Gardner, Robert Q. Lewis, Phyllis Newman, and Betty White. Collyer would end every episode by saying to the viewers at home, "In the meantime, don't you forget to tell the truth! Bye!"

=== Other work ===
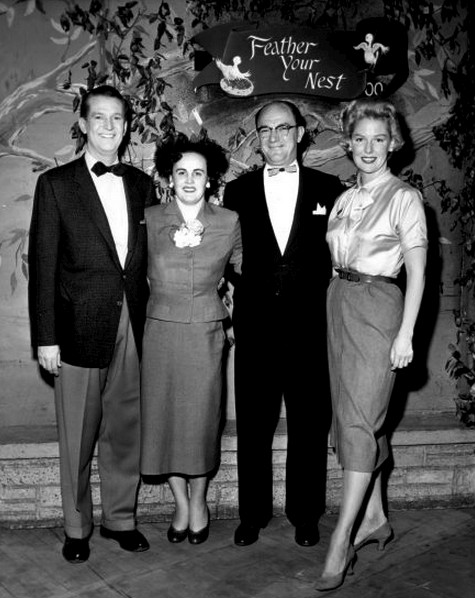
Collyer as the host of Feather Your Nest in 1956.

Collyer's other game show hosting included the DuMont game shows Talent Jackpot (1949) and On Your Way (1953–1954), the game show Feather Your Nest, and the ABC game Number Please in 1961, which replaced Beat the Clock on the Monday after the final ABC episode.

On September 24, 1957, Collyer was among the guests on To Tell the Truth panelist Polly Bergen's premiere episode of her short-lived NBC comedy/variety show, The Polly Bergen Show.

== Personal life ==
Collyer was the brother of film actress June Collyer and film producer Richard Heermance.

He married Heloise Law Green in 1936. The couple had two daughters, Cynthia and Pat, and a son, Michael, who died in 2004. In 1947, he married 1930s movie actress Marian Shockley. In January 1957, his son had appeared as a challenger on To Tell the Truth, under the name of "Pat Rizzuto". One of his daughters also appeared on the show on February 5, 1962.

=== Spirituality and charity ===
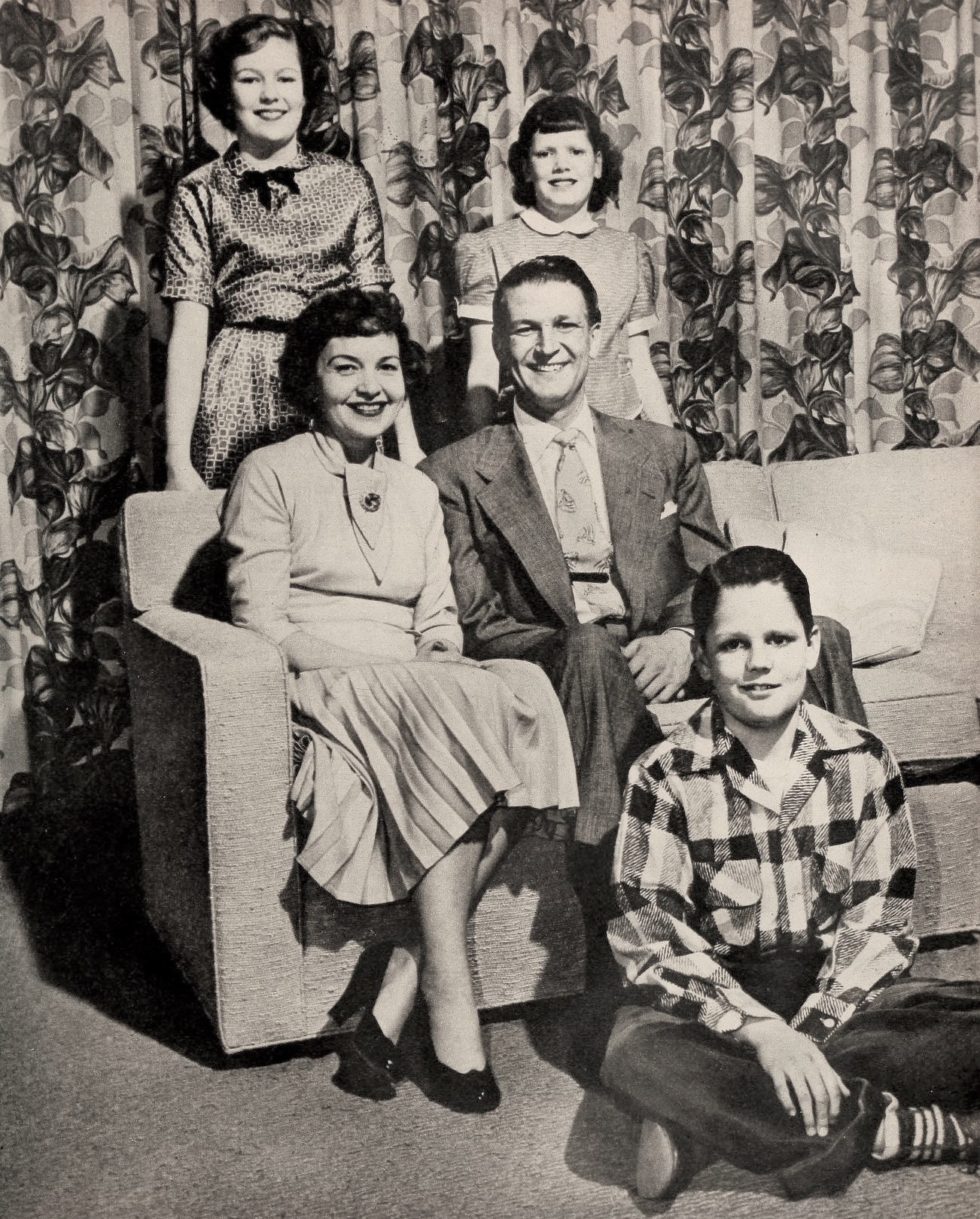
Marian Shockley and Bud Collyer with the three children from his previous marriage, 1953

Religion and charitable work were very important to Collyer, and he was always particularly pleased to hear contestants say that they considered donating portions of their winnings to the church, or that they planned to donate to charities. He would often include "God bless you" in his parting words to contestants. He was always particularly happy to have a contestant who was a minister on the show and would ask about his congregation. On Beat the Clock, he often delivered public service messages about such charitable causes as the March of Dimes and other drives for research of diseases.

Collyer taught a Sunday school class at his Presbyterian church in Connecticut for more than thirty-five years and spent some of his off time as a caretaker at his church. According to one story, a parishioner called the church one Sunday during a particularly heavy snowstorm to inquire if the church would have services that day. "Oh yes," Collyer replied, tongue in cheek, "God and I are here." Collyer was known to have contributed to various Christian religious works, including authoring at least one religious book and making a recording of the New Testament of the Good News Bible. He wrote two inspirational books, Thou Shalt Not Fear (1962) and With the Whole Heart (1966).

== Death ==
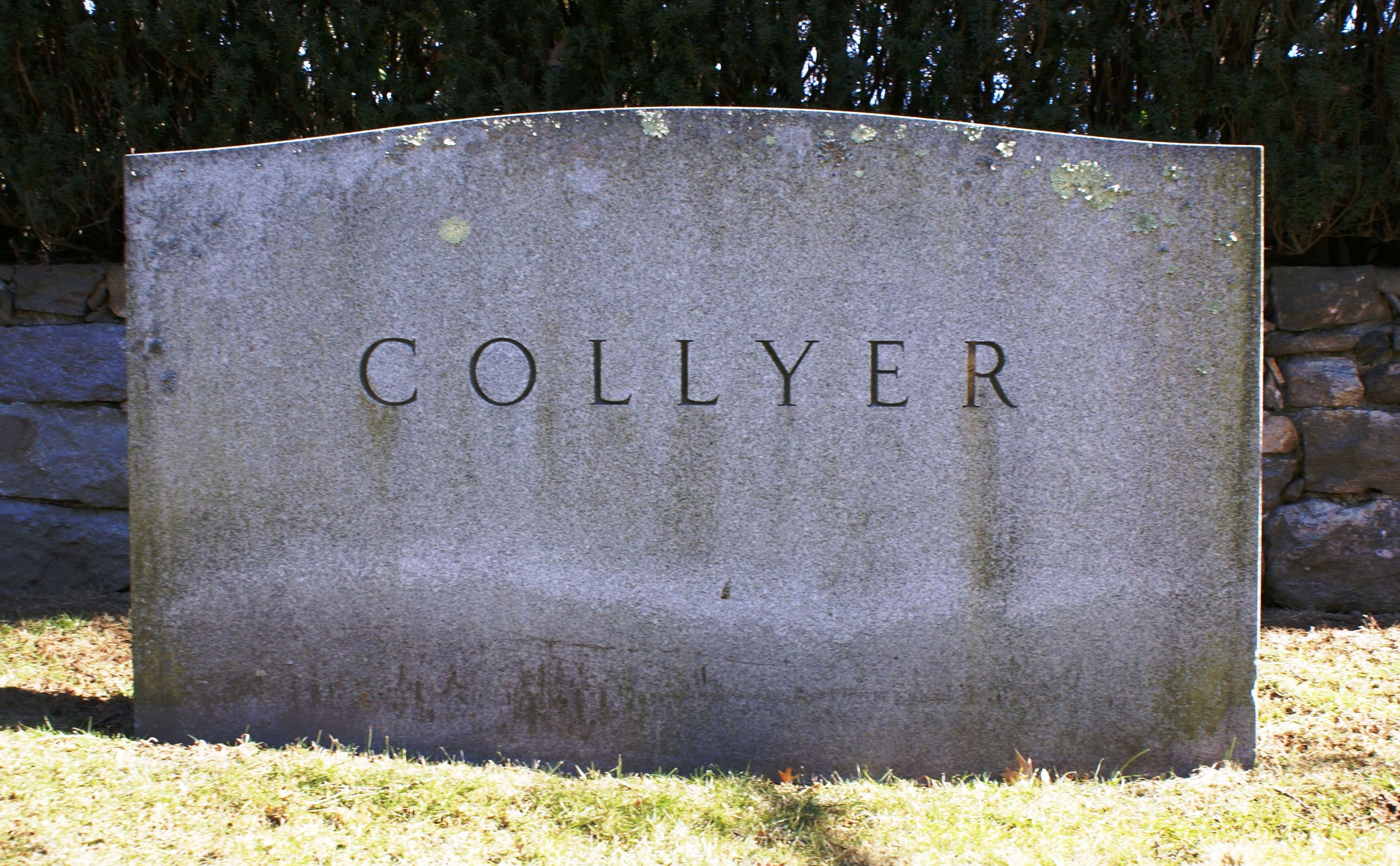
Bud Collyer's grave

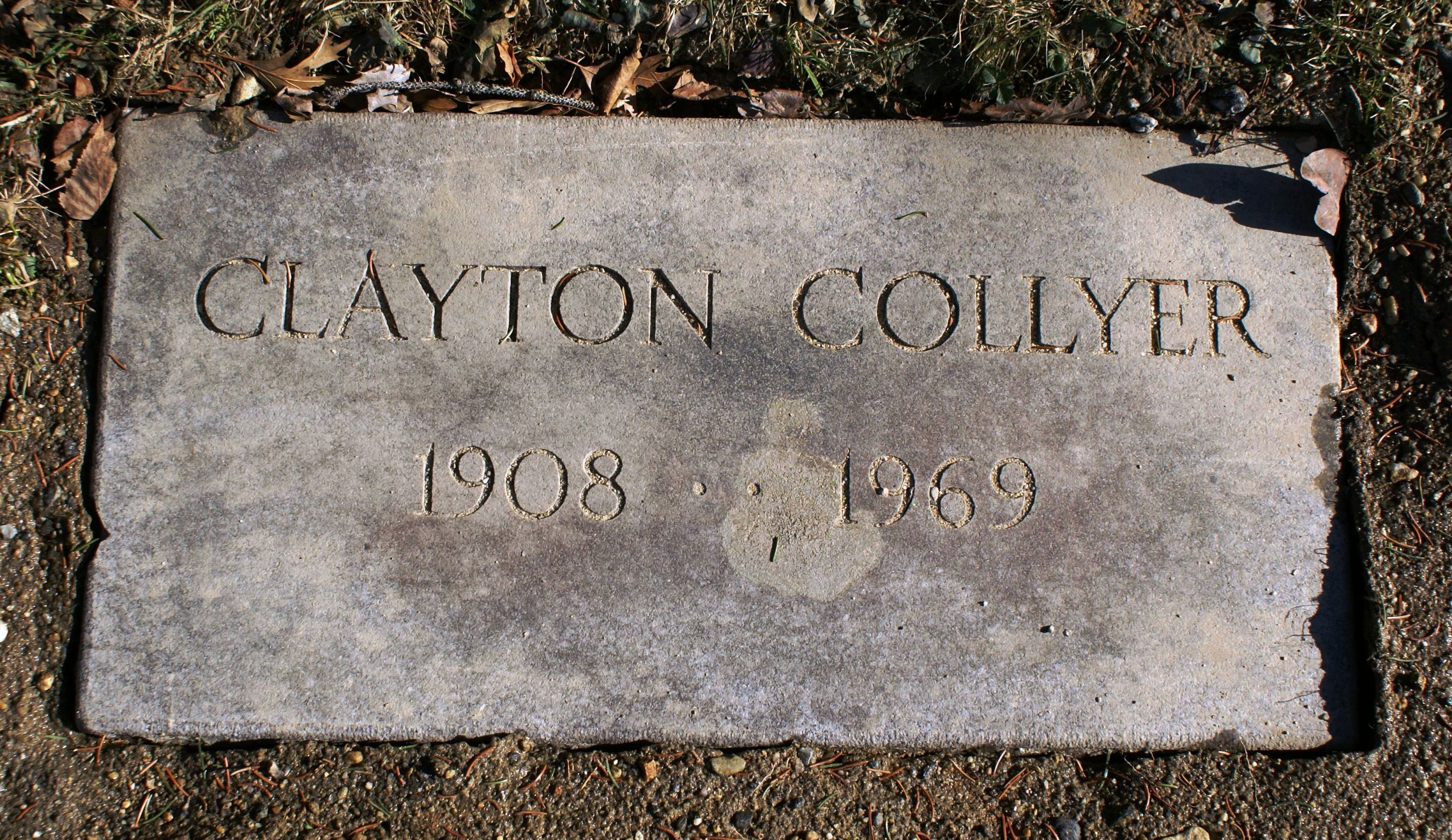
His footstone

When producers Mark Goodson and Bill Todman planned to revive To Tell the Truth, this time as a syndicated TV program, they wanted Collyer to once again host it. Collyer declined, citing poor health. When Goodson and Todman called Garry Moore about the job, he immediately called Collyer, who told Moore that "I am just not up to it." Collyer died at age 61 from a circulatory ailment in Greenwich, Connecticut, on the same day the new To Tell The Truth premiered in daytime syndication.

Collyer is interred at Putnam Cemetery in Greenwich. In 1985, he was posthumously named as one of the honorees by DC Comics in the company's 50th anniversary publication Fifty Who Made DC Great.

Media offices
Preceded by Position inaugurated	Host of Beat the Clock; 1950–1961	Succeeded by Jack Narz in 1969
Preceded by Position inaugurated	Host of To Tell the Truth; 1956–1968	Succeeded by Garry Moore
