= Chapel of the Pines Crematory =

Crematory and cemetery in Los Angeles, California

Coordinates: 34.043765°N 118.29487°W

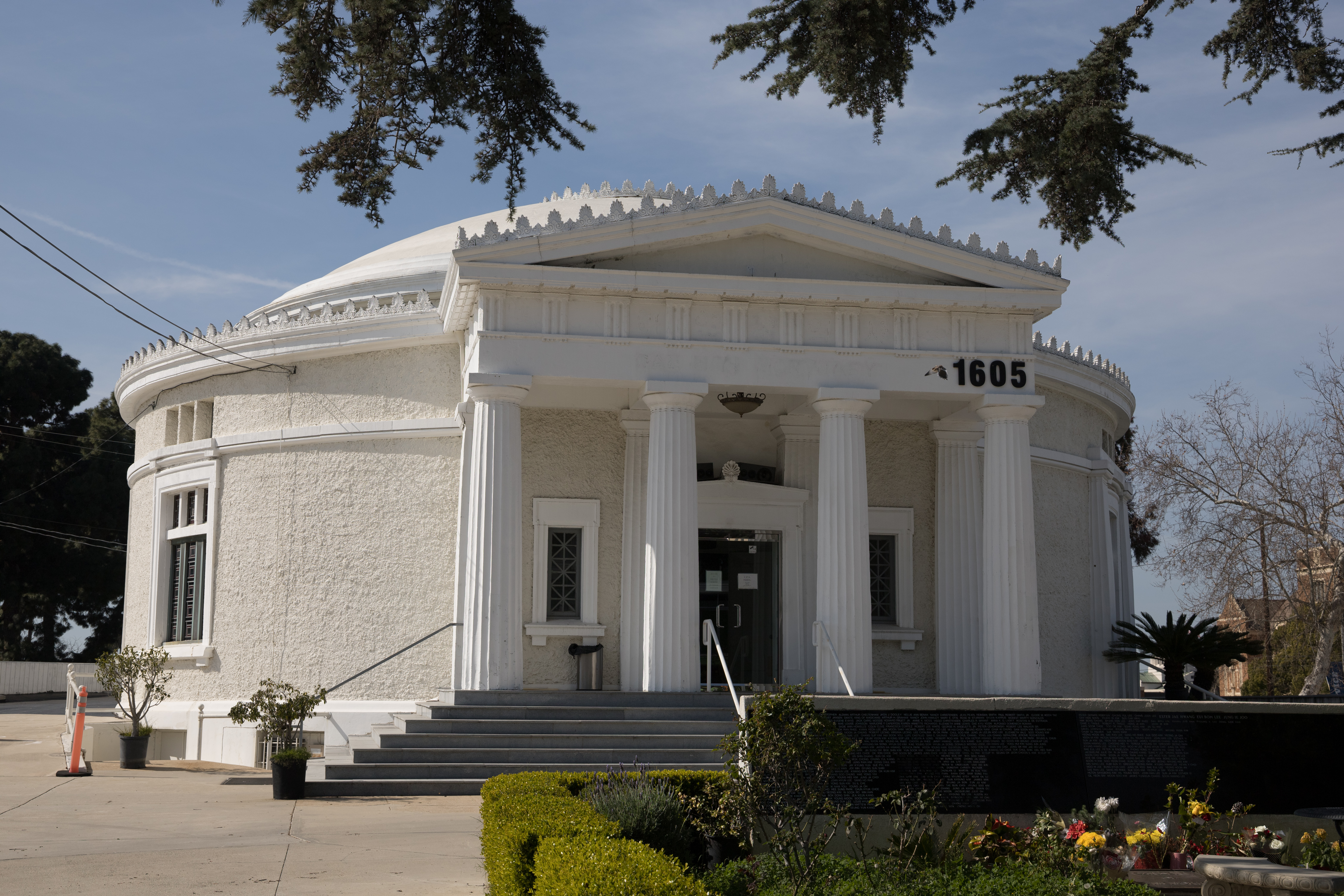
Chapel of the Pines Crematory

Chapel of the Pines Crematory is a crematory and columbarium located at 1605 South Catalina Street, Los Angeles, in the U.S. state of California, in the West Adams District a short distance southwest of Downtown. It is beside Angelus-Rosedale Cemetery, one street east, at the southwest corner of Catalina and Venice Boulevard.

Established in 1903, this domed structure, which looks like an observatory, provides crematory services and columbarium inurnment. It is the final resting place for the cremains of a number of noted persons.

== Vaultage ==
In addition to the multiple columbaria that are open to the public for visitation, there are five vaults in the basement of the crematory that are closed to the public. These vaults house the cremains of over 10,000 individuals. Cremains were placed in vaultage for a variety of reasons, including those that were unclaimed, the inability for family to pay for a public niche or the deceased or their family choosing for a private inurnment location. Most, but not all, of these cremains have been placed in copper box urns with name labels affixed to them. Chapel of the Pines ended the practice of storing cremains in the vaults in 2006 and any unclaimed cremains since then are turned over to the Los Angeles County Department of Medical Examiner after being held for sixty days. Although vaultage is no longer offered, the vaults are legally considered a tomb and, under California law, removal of cremains from the vaults is considered exhumation of a grave and is not permitted without either permission of the surviving family or a court order.

== List of notable interments ==
(Note: This is a partial list.)

Use the following alphabetical links to find someone.

== A ==
- Ted Adams (1890–1973), actor
- Broncho Billy Anderson (1882–1971), actor (private vault)
- George Anderson (1886–1948), actor
- Lionel Atwill (1885–1946), actor (private vault)
- Arthur Aylesworth (1883–1946), actor

== B ==
- Ross Bagdasarian Sr. (David Seville) (1919–1972), musician, actor, creator of Alvin and the Chipmunks
- Bob Bailey (1913–1983) radio actor
- Alma Bennett (1904–1958), actress
- Frank Brownlee (1874–1948), actor
- Nigel Bruce (1895–1953), actor
- Mae Busch (1891–1946), actress

== C ==
- Leonard Carey (1887–1977), actor
- Louise Carver (1869–1956), actress
- Helen Chandler (1906–1965), actress (originally inurned here in the private vault, ashes relocated to Hollywood Forever Cemetery in 2023)
- Parley Parker Christensen (1869–1954), Utah and California politician, Esperantist
- Dorothy Christy (1906–1976), actress
- Colin Clive (1900–1937), actor (cenotaph here, but ashes were scattered at sea)
- June Collyer (1906–1968), actress
- Heinie Conklin (1889–1959), actor
- Tom Conway (1904–1967), actor (private vault)
- Cecil Cunningham (1888–1959), actress

== D ==
- J. Searle Dawley (1877–1949), film director, screenwriter, stage actor, and playwright
- Edgar Dearing (1893–1974), actor
- William Desmond (1878–1949), actor (private vault)
- Elspeth Dudgeon (1871–1955), actress
- Margaret Dumont (1882–1965), actress

== E ==
- Stuart Erwin (1903–1967), actor
- Anthony Eustrel (1903–1979), actor

== F ==
- Bess Flowers (1898–1984), actress
- Noel Francis (1906–1959), actress
- Darrell Foss (1892–1962), actor
- Maude Fulton (1881–1950), actress, screenwriter (private vault)

== G ==
- Florence Gill (1877–1965), voice actress
- Edmund Gwenn (1877–1959), actor (originally interred here in the private vault, ashes relocated to Hollywood Forever Cemetery in 2023)

== H ==
- Raymond Hackett (1902–1958), actor
- Jean Hagen (1923–1977), actress
- Hobart Henley (1887–1964), actor
- Halliwell Hobbes (1877–1962), actor
- Arthur Hoyt (1874–1953), actor
- Warren Hymer (1906–1948), actor

== I ==
- Lloyd Ingraham (1874–1956), actor, director, and screenwriter

== J ==
- Julanne Johnston (1900–1988), actress
- Justine Johnstone (1895–1982), actress

== L ==
- Gregory La Cava (1892–1952), director
- Lew Landers (1901–1962), motion picture director
- William LeBaron (1883–1958), motion picture producer
- Mitchell Leisen (1898–1972), comedy director
- Montagu Love (1877–1943), actor
- Wilfred Lucas (1871–1940), actor, director, screenwriter

== M ==
- J. Farrell MacDonald (1875–1952), actor and director
- Herbert Marshall (1890–1966), actor
- Edward Martindel (1876–1955), actor
- Sarah Y. Mason (1896–1980), screenwriter and script supervisor (private vault)
- Torben Meyer (1884–1975), actor
- Gertrude Michael (1910–1965), actress
- Geneva Mitchell (1908–1949), actress
- Thomas Mitchell (1892–1962), actor (private vault)
- Leonard Mudie (1883–1965), actor

== N ==
- Alan Napier (1903–1988), actor (cremated here, ashes scattered in his former residence's garden)
- Ray Nazarro (1902–1986), film director
- Tom Neal (1914–1972), actor, amateur boxer, convicted of manslaughter in the death of his estranged wife
- Kurt Neumann (1908–1958), motion picture director and producer

== O ==
- Willis H. O'Brien (1886–1962), filmmaker
- Vivien Oakland (1895–1958), actress
- Philip Ober (1902–1982), actor
- Garry Owen (1902–1951), actor

== P ==
- Franklin Parker (1900–1962), actor
- Gladys Parker (1908–1966), cartoonist
- Stuart Paton (1883–1944), motion picture director (private vault)
- Eileen Percy (1900–1973), actress
- George P. Putnam (1887–1950), publisher, author and explorer, husband of Amelia Earhart

== R ==
- Warner Richmond (1886–1948), actor
- Rachel Roberts (1927–1980), actress
- Harry Ruby (1895–1974), screenwriter, songwriter and composer (private vault)

== S ==
- William Selig (1864–1948), pioneer movie studio owner
- Ann Sheridan (1915–1967), actress (originally inurned here in the private vault, ashes were relocated to Hollywood Forever Cemetery in 2005)
- Jay Silverheels (1912–1980), actor (cremated here, ashes were scattered on his Six Nations reservation in Canada)
- Herbert Standing Sr. (1846–1923), actor
- Vernon Steele (1882–1955), actor
- Harry Stubbs (1874–1950), actor
- Noel Francis (1906–1959), actress

== T ==
- Zeffie Tilbury (1863–1950), actress
- Florence Turner (1885–1946), actress, producer, and screenwriter (private vault)

== V ==
- Philip Van Zandt (1904–1958), actor (private vault)

== W ==
- H. B. Warner (1875–1958), actor
- E. Allyn Warren (1874–1940), actor
- Lyle R. Wheeler (1905–1990), movie art director
- Kathlyn Williams (1888–1960), actress, screenwriter

== Y ==
- Cy Young (1897–1964), animator

The British Commonwealth War Graves Commission commemorates one Commonwealth serviceman whose ashes are interred here, a soldier of the Canadian Army of World War I.
