= Woman Wise =

1928 film by Albert Ray

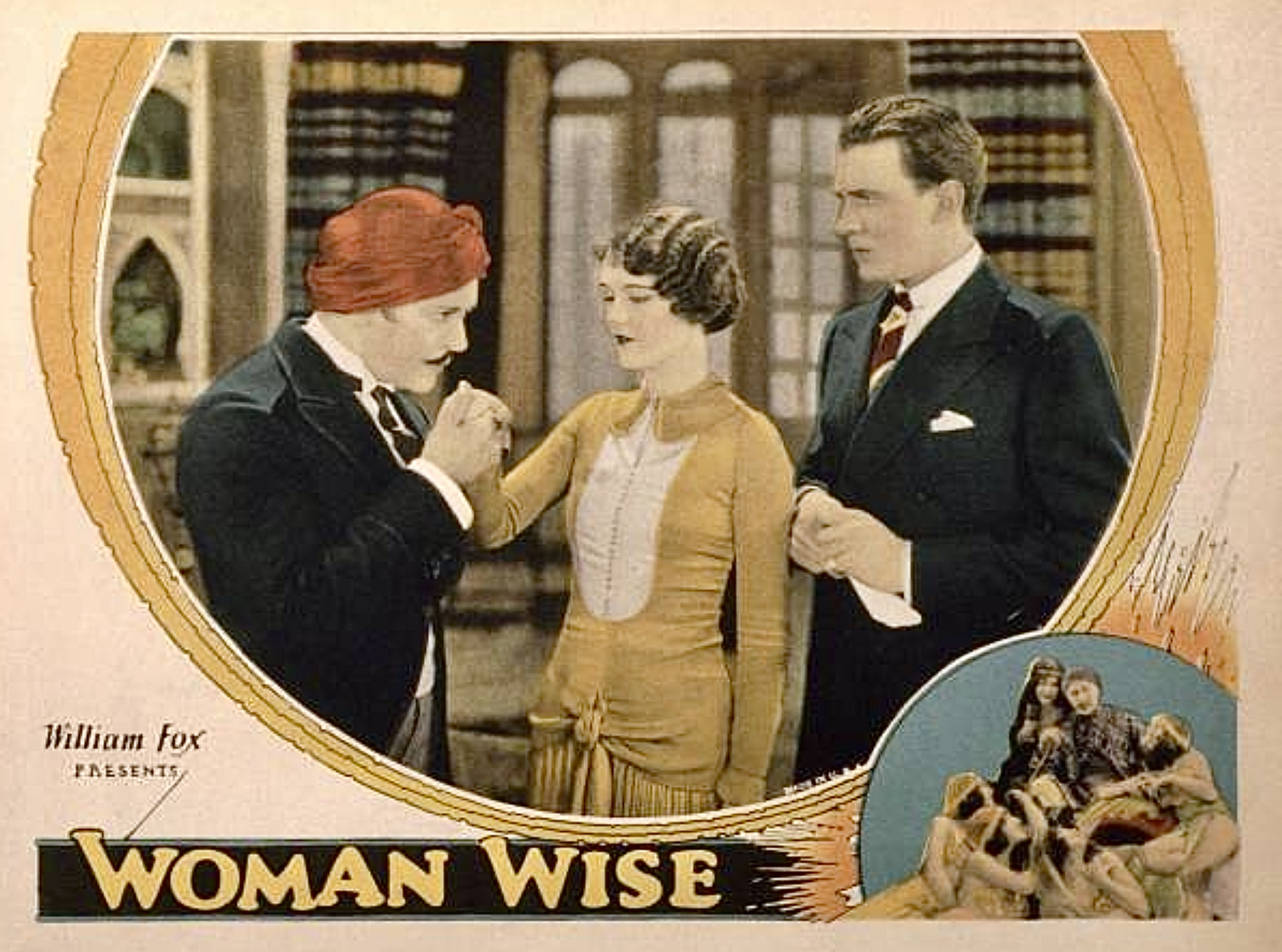
- Directed by: Albert Ray
- Written by: Andrew Bennison; Malcolm Stuart Boylan; Randall Faye; Donald McGibney; James Kevin McGuinness
- Starring: William Russell; June Collyer; Walter Pidgeon
- Cinematography: Sidney Wagner
- Edited by: Ralph Dixon
- Production company: Fox Film Corporation
- Distributed by: Fox Film Corporation
- Release date: January 8, 1928
- Country: United States
- Languages: Silent; English intertitles

Woman Wise is a 1928 American silent comedy drama film directed by Albert Ray and starring William Russell, June Collyer, and Walter Pidgeon.

== Cast ==
- William Russell as Ne'er-Do-Well
- June Collyer as Millie Baxter
- Walter Pidgeon as United States Consul
- Theodore Kosloff as Abdul Mustapha
- Ernest Shields as Valet
- Raoul Paoli as Khurd Chief
- Duke Kahanamoku as Guard
- Josephine Borio as Native Girl
- Carmen Castillo as Native Girl

== Preservation status ==
The film so far as is known is now lost. A foreign archive may have some parts but is unconfirmed.

== See also ==
- 1937 Fox vault fire

== Bibliography ==
- Solomon, Aubrey. The Fox Film Corporation, 1915-1935. A History and Filmography. McFarland & Co, 2011.
