= Sunday Night at the Trocadero =

1937 film by George Sidney

The Brian Sisters sing in Sunday Night at the Trocadero.

Sunday Night at the Trocadero is a 1937 short film directed by George Sidney. It appears as a special feature on the DVD version of the Marx Brothers' A Night at the Opera.

== Cast ==
- Reginald Denny as Master of Ceremonies
- Connee Boswell
- The Brian Sisters
- Dick Foran
- John Howard
- Margot Grahame
- Chester Morris
- Robert Benchley
- Sally Blane
- Norman Foster
- Groucho Marx
- Ruth Johnson
- Frank Morgan
- Bert Wheeler
- Eric Blore
- June Collyer
- Stuart Erwin
- Toby Wing
- Russell Gleason
- Cynthia Lindsay
- Glenda Farrell
- Frank McHugh
- Benny Rubin
- Peter Lind Hayes
