= June Collyer =

American film actress (1906–1968)

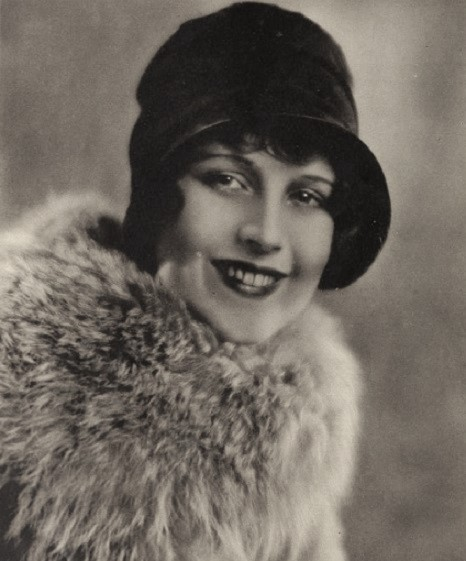
- Collyer in 1929
- Born: Dorothea Heermance; August 19, 1906; New York City, U.S.
- Died: March 16, 1968 (aged 61); Los Angeles, California, U.S.
- Resting place: Chapel of the Pines Crematory, Los Angeles, California, U.S.
- Occupation: Actress
- Years active: 1927–1958
- Spouse: Stuart Erwin (m. 1931; died 1967)
- Children: 2
- Relatives: Bud Collyer (brother); Marian Shockley (sister-in-law)

June Collyer (born Dorothea Heermance; August 19, 1906 – March 16, 1968) was an American film actress of the 1920s and 1930s.

== Early life ==
Born in New York City, Collyer chose to use her mother's maiden name when she decided to pursue acting. Her father was Clayton Heermance, an attorney in New York.

== Career ==
A debutante chosen by Allan Dwan, Collyer had her first starring role in 1927 when she starred in East Side, West Side. She did a total of 11 silent films, and she made a successful transition to sound movies.

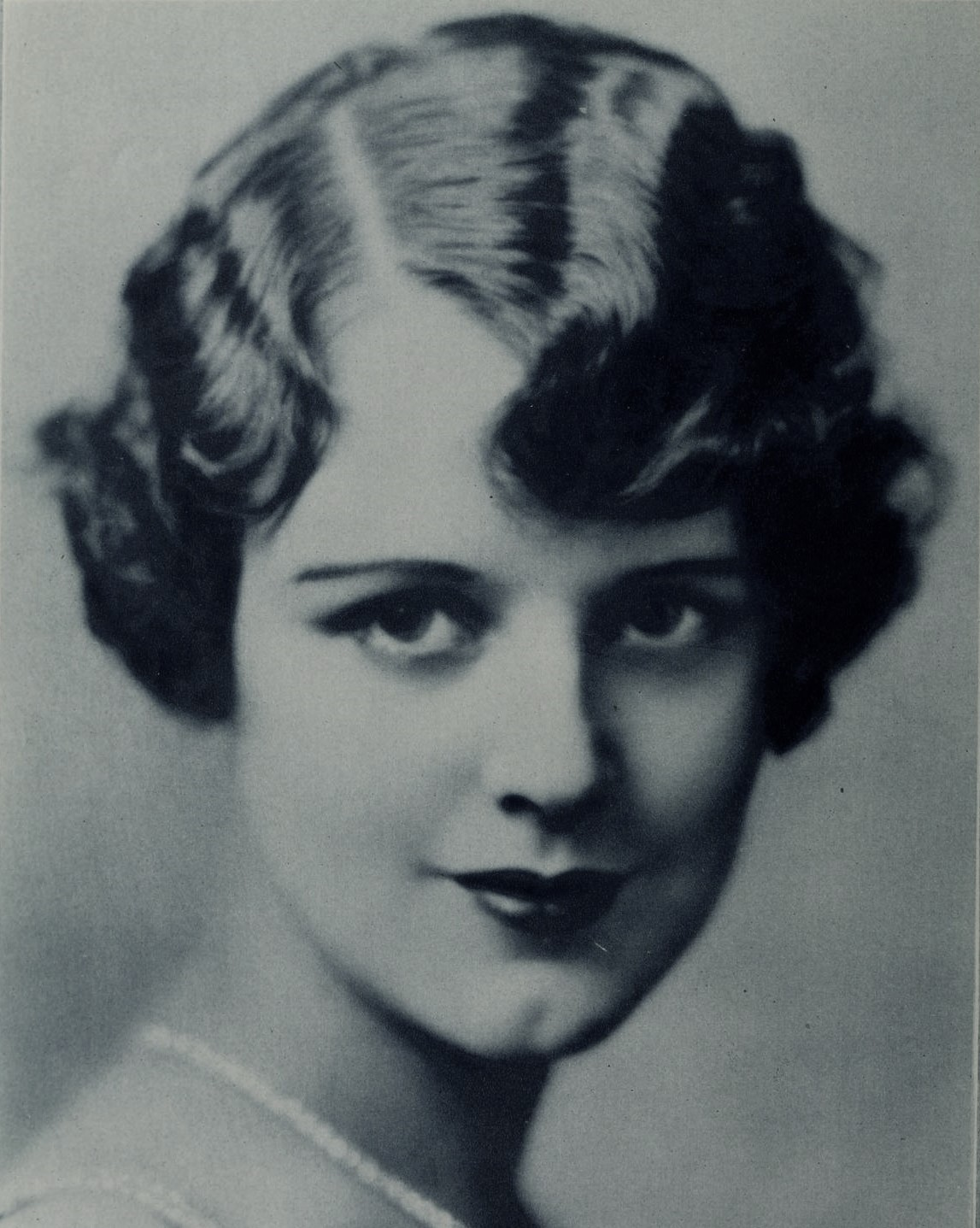
Collyer in 1928

In 1928, she was one of 13 girls selected as "WAMPAS Baby Stars", an honor her future sister-in-law Marian Shockley received in 1932. In 1930, Collyer starred opposite Louise Dresser and Joyce Compton in The Three Sisters, and the same year, she starred with Claudia Dell in Sweet Kitty Bellairs. She starred in 19 films from 1930 to 1936. She took a break in the 1940s, either by choice or due to her not receiving starring roles. During the 1950s, she returned to acting, having a regular role on the television series The Stu Erwin Show (or Trouble with Father) from 1950 through 1955, starring with her husband Stu Erwin. She played in one episode of the 1958 series Playhouse 90, then retired.

== Personal life ==
Collyer was the sister of Bud Collyer, and her sister-in-law was actress Marian Shockley. On July 22, 1931, in Yuma, Arizona, she married actor Stu Erwin. Together they had two children, including producer Stuart Erwin Jr. (1932–2014). They remained wed until he died in December 1967, a few months before her death.

She remained in Los Angeles.

== Death ==
Collyer died at the age of 61 on March 16, 1968, of bronchial pneumonia. She was interred at Chapel of the Pines Crematory.

== Partial filmography ==
- East Side, West Side (1927)
- Woman Wise (1928)
- Hangman's House (1928)
- Me, Gangster (1928)
- The Love Doctor (1929)
- Not Quite Decent (1929)
- River of Romance (1929)
- The Three Sisters (1930)
- A Man from Wyoming (1930)
- Extravagance (1930)
- Charley's Aunt (1930)
- Kiss Me Again (1931)
- The Brat (1931)
- Alexander Hamilton (1931)
- Revenge at Monte Carlo (1933)
- Before Midnight (1933)
- Lost in the Stratosphere (1934)
- The Ghost Walks (1934)
- Murder by Television (1935)
- A Face in the Fog (1936)
- Sunday Night at the Trocadero (1937)
