= Stuart Erwin =

American actor (1903–1967)

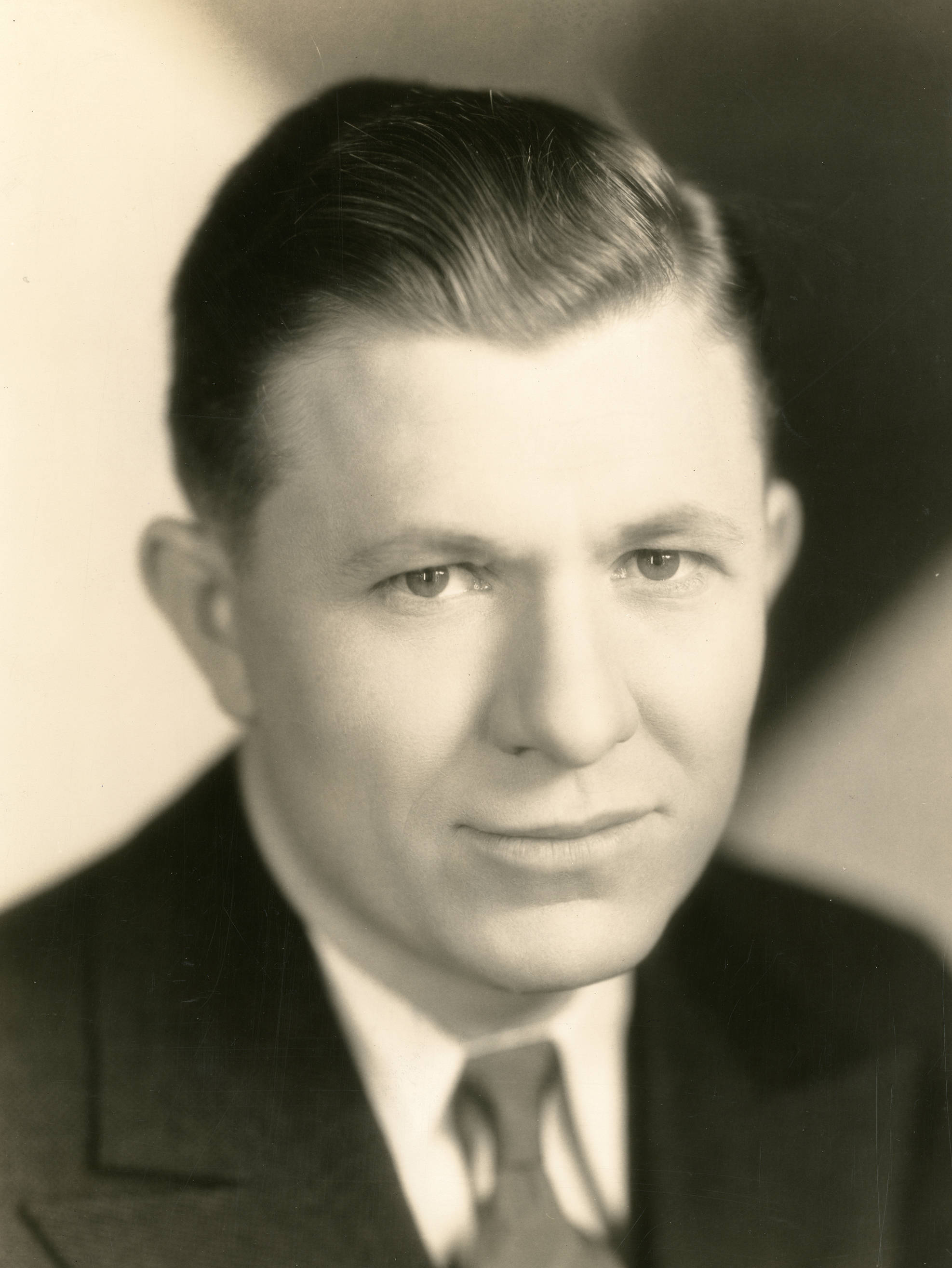
- Erwin in 1930
- Born: February 14, 1903; Squaw Valley, Fresno County, California, U.S.
- Died: December 21, 1967 (aged 64); Beverly Hills, California, U.S.
- Resting place: Chapel of the Pines Crematory
- Occupation: Actor
- Years active: 1922–1967
- Spouse: June Collyer (m. 1931)
- Children: 2
- Relatives: Bud Collyer (brother-in-law); Marian Shockley (sister-in-law)

Stuart Erwin (February 14, 1903 – December 21, 1967) was an American actor of stage, film, and television.

== Early years ==
Erwin was born in Squaw Valley, Fresno County, California. He attended Porterville High School and the University of California.

== Career ==
Erwin began acting in college in the 1920s, having first appeared on stage. From there, he acted in stock theater in Los Angeles.

=== Film career ===
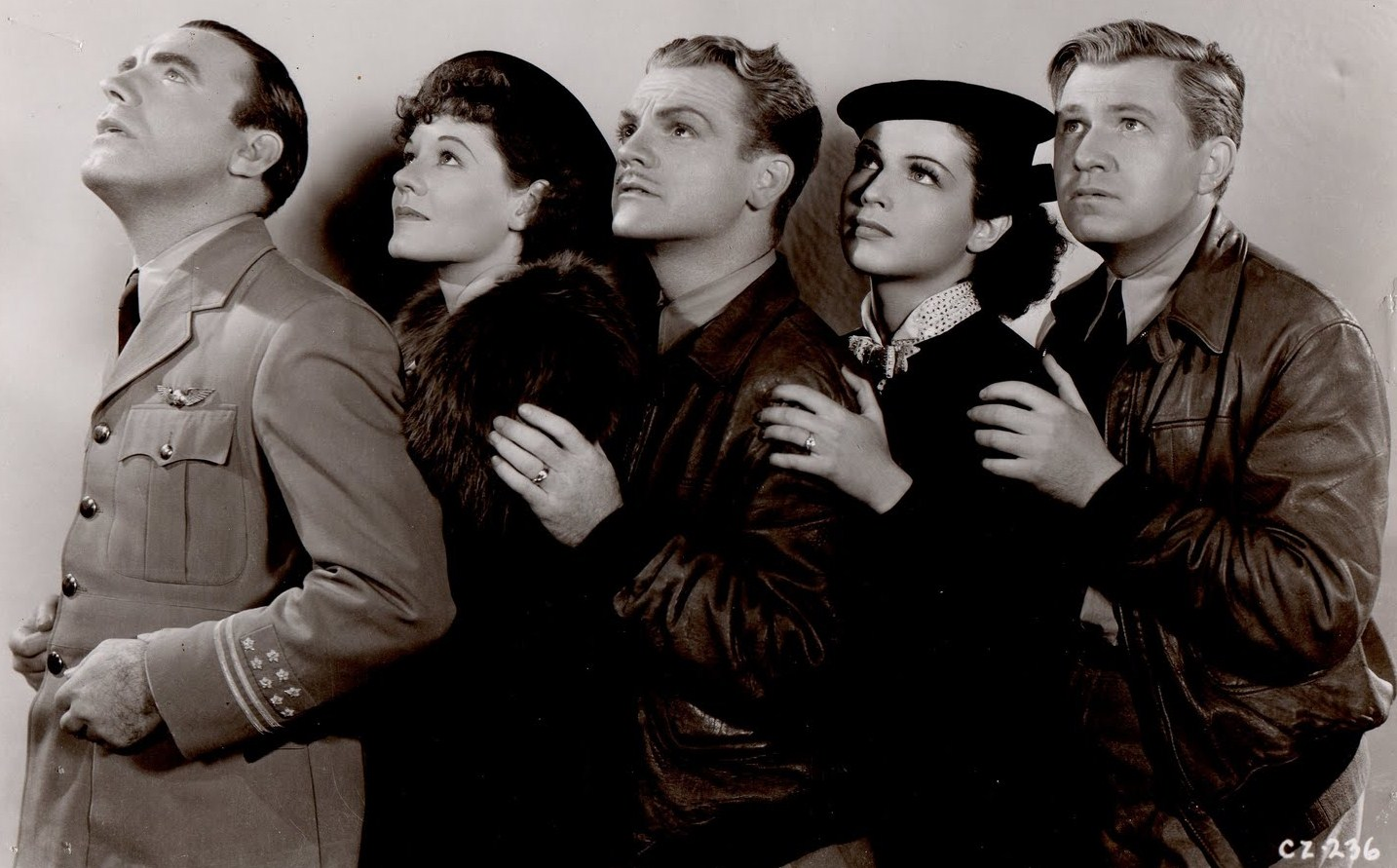
Erwin, far right, with Pat O'Brien, Martha Tibbetts, James Cagney, and June Travis in Ceiling Zero (1936)

He broke into films in 1928 in Mother Knows Best. In 1934, he was cast as Joe Palooka in the film Palooka. In 1932, he co-starred with Bing Crosby in the comedy The Big Broadcast, where he played Texas oil tycoon Leslie McWhinney.

In 1936, he was cast in Pigskin Parade, for which he was nominated for the Academy Award for Best Supporting Actor. In 1940, he played Howie Newsome, the dairy delivery vendor, in the film adaptation of Our Town, based on the Thornton Wilder play.

In Walt Disney's Bambi, Erwin performed the voice of a tree squirrel. Later, Erwin appeared in the Disney films Son of Flubber and The Misadventures of Merlin Jones.

=== Radio career ===
Beginning in 1936, Erwin was a featured player on the CBS musical-comedy series, Jack Oakie's College, part of the Camel Caravan. In 1945 Erwin hosted The Stu Erwin Show, a short-lived summer comedy series on CBS. In 1946, Erwin starred in Phone Again Finnegan, also on CBS. He played an apartment house manager in the comedy-drama.

He also played various roles on Theater Guild on the Air, Lux Radio Theatre, The Old Gold Radio Theatre and Cavalcade of America.

=== Television career ===
In 1950, Erwin made the transition to television, in which he starred in Trouble with Father, which was retitled The Stu Erwin Show, with his co-star and real-life wife June Collyer. In 1963–1964, he played Otto King on The Greatest Show on Earth.

Erwin guest-starred on Crossroads, Angel, Bonanza, The Donna Reed Show, Straightaway, Gunsmoke and Our Man Higgins.

Erwin made four guest appearances on Perry Mason, including the role of Clem P. "Sandy" Sandover in the 1962 episode "The Case of the Double-Entry Mind" and Everett Stanton in the 1964 episode "The Case of the Scandalous Sculptor".

Erwin guest-starred on Father Knows Best in the episode titled "Family Contest" in the role of Mr. Hensley and on The Andy Griffith Show, season 1, episode 8, portraying Tom Silby who was presumed dead, but returned to town after a two-year absence.

== Personal life ==
Erwin married actress June Collyer on July 22, 1931, in Yuma, Arizona. Together they had two children, including producer Stuart Erwin Jr. (1932–2014).

== Death ==
Erwin died of a heart attack on December 21, 1967, in Beverly Hills, California, at age 64. He was interred at the Chapel of the Pines Crematory in Los Angeles.

== Recognition ==
Erwin has a star at 6270 Hollywood Boulevard in the Television section of the Hollywood Walk of Fame. It was dedicated February 8, 1960.

== Partial filmography ==
- Mother Knows Best (1928) as Ben
- New Year's Eve (1929) as Landlady's Son
- Speakeasy (1929) as Cy Williams
- Thru Different Eyes (1929) as Reporter
- The Exalted Flapper (1929) as Bimbo Mehaffey
- Dangerous Curves (1929) as Rotarian
- The Sophomore (1929) as Radio Broadcast Technician (uncredited)
- Happy Days (1929) as Jig
- The Cock-Eyed World (1929) as Buckley
- Sweetie (1929) as Axel Bronstrup
- The Trespasser (1929) as Reporter (uncredited)
- This Thing Called Love (1929) as Fred
- Men Without Women (1930) as Radioman Jenkins
- Young Eagles (1930) as Pudge Higgins
- Paramount on Parade (1930) as Marine (The Montmartre Girl)
- Dangerous Nan McGrew (1930) as Eustace Macy
- Love Among the Millionaires (1930) as Clicker Watson
- Playboy of Paris (1930) as Paul Michel
- Only Saps Work (1930) as Oscar
- Along Came Youth (1930) as Ambrose
- No Limit (1931) as Ole Olson
- Dude Ranch (1931) as Chester Carr
- Up Pops the Devil (1931) as Stranger
- The Magnificent Lie (1931) as Elmer Graham
- Working Girls (1931) as Pat Kelly
- Two Kinds of Women (1932) as Hauser
- Strangers in Love (1932) as Stan Kenney
- Misleading Lady (1932) as Boney
- Make Me a Star (1932) as Merton Gill
- The Big Broadcast (1932) as Leslie McWhinney
- Face in the Sky (1933) as Lucky
- The Crime of the Century (1933) as Dan McKee
- He Learned About Women (1933) as Peter Potter Kendall II
- Under the Tonto Rim (1933) as 'Tonto' Daily
- International House (1933) as Tommy Nash
- Hold Your Man (1933) as Al Simpson
- The Stranger's Return (1933) as Simon Bates
- Before Dawn (1933) as Dwight Wilson
- Day of Reckoning (1933) as Jerry
- Going Hollywood (1933) as Ernest P. Baker
- Palooka (1934) as Joe Palooka
- Viva Villa! (1934) as Jonny Sykes
- Bachelor Bait (1934) as Mr. William Watts
- The Party's Over (1934)
- Chained (1934) as John L. 'Johnnie' Smith
- Have a Heart (1934) as Gus Anderson
- The Band Plays On (1934) as Stuffy Wilson
- After Office Hours (1935) as Hank Parr
- Ceiling Zero (1936) as Texas Clarke
- Exclusive Story (1936) as Timothy Aloysius Higgins
- Absolute Quiet (1936) as 'Chubby' Rudd
- Women Are Trouble (1936) as Matt Casey
- All American Chump (1936) as Elmer Lamb
- Pigskin Parade (1936) as Amos Dodd
- Slim (1937) as Stumpy
- Dance Charlie Dance (1937) as Andrew 'Andy' Tucker
- Small Town Boy (1937) as Henry Armstrong
- Sunday Night at the Trocadero (1937)
- Second Honeymoon (1937) as Leo MacTavish
- I'll Take Romance (1937) as 'Pancho' Brown
- Checkers (1937) as Edgar Connell
- Mr. Boggs Steps Out (1938) as Oliver Boggs
- Three Blind Mice (1938) as Mike Brophy
- Passport Husband (1938) as Henry Cabot
- Back Door to Heaven (1939) as Jud Mason
- It Could Happen to You (1939) as Mackinley Winslow
- Hollywood Cavalcade (1939) as Pete Tinney
- The Honeymoon's Over (1939) as Donald Todd
- Our Town (1940) as Howie Newsome
- When the Daltons Rode (1940) as Ben Dalton
- A Little Bit of Heaven (1940) as Cotton
- Sandy Gets Her Man (1940) as Bill Kerry
- Cracked Nuts (1941) as Lawrence Trent
- The Bride Came C.O.D. (1941) as Tommy Keenan
- The Adventures of Martin Eden (1942) as Joe Dawson
- Drums of the Congo (1942) as Congo Jack
- Blondie for Victory (1942) as Pvt. Herschel Smith
- He Hired the Boss (1943) as Hubert Wilkins
- The Great Mike (1944) as Jay Spencer
- Pillow to Post (1945) as Captain Jack Ross
- Killer Dill (1947) as Johnny 'Killer' Dill
- Heaven Only Knows (1947) as Sheriff Matt Bodine
- Heading for Heaven (1947) as Henry Elkins
- Doctor Jim (1947) as Dr. James (Jim) Gateson
- Strike It Rich (1948) as Delbart Lane
- Father Is a Bachelor (1950) as Constable Pudge Barnham
- Main Street to Broadway (1953) as Stuart Erwin, First Nighter (uncredited)
- For the Love of Mike (1960) as Dr. Mills
- Son of Flubber (1963) as Coach Wilson
- The Misadventures of Merlin Jones (1964) as Police Captain Loomis
