= Men Without Women (film) =

1930 film directed by John Ford

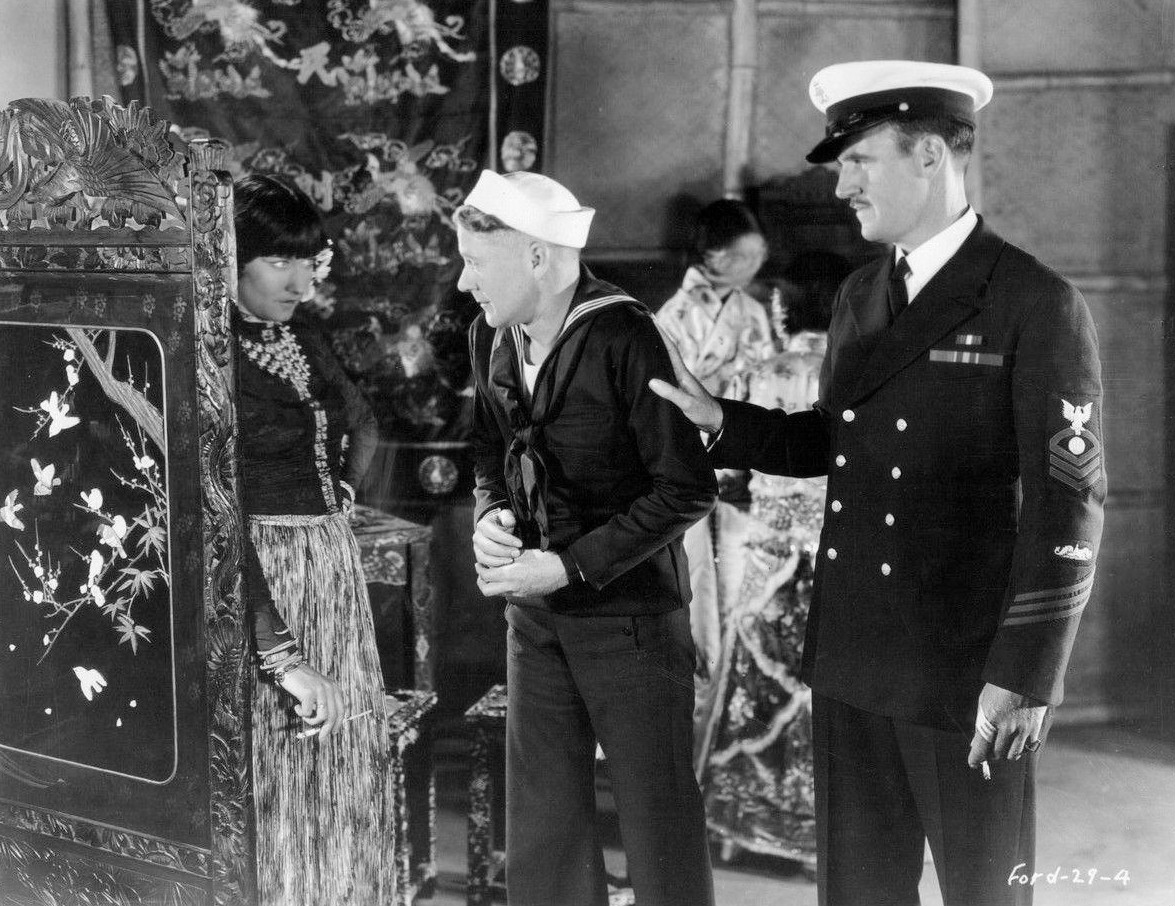
- Scene from the film
- Directed by: John Ford
- Screenplay by: Dudley Nichols
- Story by: John Ford; James Kevin McGuinness
- Produced by: John Ford
- Starring: Kenneth MacKenna; Farrell MacDonald; Stuart Erwin; Paul Page; Frank Albertson; Warren Hymer; Walter McGrail
- Cinematography: Joseph H. August
- Edited by: Walter Thompson
- Music by: Carli Elinor
- Distributed by: Fox Film Corporation
- Release date: January 31, 1930
- Running time: 77 minutes
- Country: United States
- Language: English

Men Without Women is a 1930 American pre-Code drama film directed and written by John Ford, from the script by James Kevin McGuinness. The film also starred Kenneth MacKenna, Frank Albertson, and J. Farrell MacDonald. The sound version is now lost. Only a print of the "International Sound Version", held by the Museum of Modern Art, survives.

== Plot ==
U.S. Navy divers race to save the crew of a foundered submarine as the sailors hopelessly prepare to die.

== Cast ==
- Kenneth MacKenna as Chief Torpedoman Burke
- Frank Albertson as Ensign Albert Edward Price
- J. Farrell MacDonald as Costello
- Warren Hymer as Kaufman
- Paul Page as Handsome
- Walter McGrail as Joe Cobb
- Stuart Erwin as Radioman Jenkins
- George Le Guere as Curly Pollock
- Charles K. Gerrard as Commander Weymouth
- Ben Hendricks, Jr. as Murphy
- Harry Tenbrook as Dutch Winkler
- Warner Richmond as Lieutenant Commander Briddwell
- John Wayne Radioman on surface (uncredited)

Men Without Women (1930) International Sound Version

== Release ==
The film premiered on January 31, 1930, in New York City. The production was filmed on Santa Catalina Island, California, and was released by the Fox Film Corporation.
