= James Kevin McGuinness =

American screenwriter

- Born: December 20, 1894; Drogheda, County Louth, Ireland
- Died: December 4, 1950 (aged 56); New York City, New York, U.S.A.
- Years active: 1927–1950

James Kevin McGuinness (December 20, 1894 – December 4, 1950) was an American screenwriter and film producer. He provided testimony to the House Un-American Activities Committee which led to the Hollywood blacklist in 1947.

== Early life ==
McGuinness was born on December 20, 1894, in Drogheda, County Louth, Ireland, and immigrated to New York in 1904.

== Career ==
McGuinness was one of the earliest editors and contributors at The New Yorker magazine; in the March 14, 1925, issue, he profiled the boxer Jack Dempsey and continued to contribute pieces (nonfiction, fiction, and poetry) until 1927. He relocated to Los Angeles in the late 1920s, at the dawn of the "talkies" era, and thereafter worked in the film industry as a writer and producer. He wrote for 36 films between 1927 and 1950. He eventually became chief supervisor and executive producer at Metro-Goldwyn-Mayer.

== Other activities ==
In 1947, along with fellow screenwriter Jack Moffitt, he testified against others suspected of Communist leanings in Hollywood for hearings associated with the House Un-American Activities Committee, which led to the Hollywood blacklist.

== Death ==
McGuiness died in New York on December 4, 1950, from a heart ailment.

== Selected filmography ==
- Slaves of Beauty (1927)
- A Girl in Every Port (1928)
- Woman Wise (1928)
- Strong Boy (1929)
- The Woman from Hell (1929)
- The Black Watch (1929)
- Born Reckless (1930)
- Men Without Women (1930)
- Under Suspicion (1930)
- West of Broadway (1931)
- Attorney for the Defense (1932)
- This Sporting Age (1932)
- When Strangers Marry (1933)
- Viva Villa! (1934)
- A Night at the Opera (1935)
- Madame X (1937)
- The Battle of Midway (1942)
- Rio Grande (1950)

== Bibliography ==
=== Articles ===
- J. M. (February 28, 1925). "A slogan haunts the bishop". Behind the News. The New Yorker. Vol. 1, no. 2. p. 4.
- McGuinness, James Kevin (February 28, 1925). "Beginning at the bottom". Behind the News. The New Yorker. Vol. 1, no. 2. p. 5.
- — (February 28, 1925). "The laud will provide". The New Yorker. Vol. 1, no. 2. p. 22.
- J. M. (March 7, 1925). "Call 'Beekman 2,000'". Behind the News. The New Yorker. Vol. 1, no. 3. pp. 2–3.
- McGuinness, James Kevin (March 14, 1925). "A symbol in pugilism". Profiles. The New Yorker. Vol. 1, no. 4. pp. 15–16. Jack Dempsey.
- — (April 18, 1925). "Modom". The New Yorker. Vol. 1, no. 9. pp. 7–8.
- — (April 25, 1925). "A process of law". The New Yorker. Vol. 1, no. 10. p. 7.

=== List of poems ===
Title	Year	First published	Reprinted/collected
A Bob ballad : modes	1925	McGuinness, James Kevin (March 7, 1925). "A Bob ballad : modes". The New Yorker. Vol. 1, no. 3. p. 18.	
Supper club lights	1925	McGuinness, James Kevin (May 23, 1925). "Supper club lights". The New Yorker. Vol. 1, no. 14. p. 6.	
