= G-Man =

G-Man (plural G-Men) may refer to:

== Law enforcement ==
- G-man, short for "Government Man", slang for federal law enforcement agents
- G-Men, a reference to a detectives of the Dublin Metropolitan Police force's G Division in early 20th-century Ireland

== People ==
- G. Gordon Liddy (1930–2021), nicknamed G-Man on his radio show. Liddy was an FBI agent at one time earlier in his life
- Gary Gerould, American sports broadcaster, nicknamed "The G-Man"
- Gerald McClellan (born 1967), former American boxer nicknamed "G-Man"
- Monty Sopp (born 1963), professional wrestler known also as "The G-Man"
- Gez Varley, British techno musician and DJ

=== Fictional and other ===
- G-Man (Half-Life), a character in the Half-Life computer game series who is dressed like a government official
- Goatse man, a man on an internet shock site
- A slang word for Godzilla
- Augustus "Gus"/"G-Man" Bachman Turner, a character from the animated television series Robotboy

== Other ==
- G Men, a 1935 Hollywood crime film
- G-Man: J. Edgar Hoover and the Making of the American Century, 2022 biography of J. Edgar Hoover by Beverly Gage
- G-Man (Sonny Rollins album), 1986
- G-Man (Rake album), 1996
- G-Man (comics), a comic written by Chris Giarrusso
- G-men (magazine), a monthly Japanese magazine for gay men
- New York Giants, a National Football League team nicknamed G-Men
- The Pleazers, a 1960s Australian band originally named G-Men

== See also ==
- Junior G-Men, an American boys club in the 1930s and 1940s, and related radio program, books, and films that promoted the FBI
