= Junior G-Men =

American boys club

Junior G-Men was an American boys club and popular culture phenomenon during the late 1930s and early 1940s that began with a radio program and culminated with films featuring the Dead End Kids.

== Origins ==
After leaving the Federal Bureau of Investigation and a brief stint in Hollywood, Melvin Purvis hosted a children's radio program called "Junior G-Men" in 1936. Purvis had become a national hero for his record as an FBI agent during the so-called "war on crime" in the early 1930s, most notably for leading the manhunt that ended with the death of John Dillinger. As a result of this fame, Purvis was seen as a real-life counterpart to the fictional detectives, such as Dick Tracy, that proliferated in the popular culture targeting boys during this period. As part of the radio program, listeners could join a "Junior G-Men" club and receive badges, manuals, and secret agent props. Shortly thereafter, Purvis became the face of breakfast cereal Post Toasties promotional detective club. The cereal company's fictional "Inspector Post" and his "Junior Detective Corps" metamorphosed into an image of Purvis inviting boys and girls to become "secret operators" in his "Law and Order Patrols."

As a result of this mass exposure, Junior G-Men clubs sprouted up throughout the United States and Canada as a "law and order" themed alternative to the Boy Scouts. Junior G-Men clubs found support from police departments and non-profit organizations that saw them as a means of combating juvenile delinquency. The clubs structured children's time with activities designed to instill law-abiding attitudes, as reflected in their slogan "It's easier to build boys than to mend men."

Junior G-Men was part of the larger "war on crime" campaign being waged through the mass media, which included movies, comic books and strips, radio programs, and pulp books, all of which was encouraged by the FBI and especially its director, J. Edgar Hoover prior to World War II. Most of these featured adult "G-Men" even when marketed to children. The difference with the Junior G-Men was that it was designed to give boys a sense of participating in the exciting adult world of crime-fighting. That said, aside from the original radio program, a book, Junior 'G' Men's Own Mystery Stories (by Gilbert A. Lathrop, Edward O'Connor, and Norton Hughs Jonathan) was published in 1936 and a big little book by Morrell Massey and Henry E. Vallely the following year. Eventually they also appeared on the big screen.

== Film serials ==
To bring the Junior G-Men to life on the big screen, Universal Studios enlisted the Little Tough Guys and the Dead End Kids, a group of on-screen street toughs that later became known as The Bowery Boys. Two serials were made: Junior G-Men (1940) and Junior G-Men of the Air (1942).

In Junior G-Men, a 12-chapter serial, a gang of street kids work with the FBI and the Junior G-Men to find and rescue their leader's father, a scientist who has been kidnapped by "The Flaming Torches," a group of saboteurs in league with a sinister foreign power.

The second film is a 12-chapter serial, Junior G-Men of the Air, in which the Junior G-Men thwart the "Order of the Black Dragonfly," a Japanese fifth column organization planning to destroy America's oil wells.

In Let's Get Tough! the East Side Kids call themselves "Junior G-Men" when investigating sabotage.

== See also ==
- Federal Bureau of Investigation portrayal in media
- Secret Agent X-9 – a comic strip created by Dashiell Hammett that was used to promote the FBI in the 1930s
- G Men – a 1935 film starring James Cagney, intended as a rejoinder to the gangster film genre
- Dick Tracy's G-Men – a film serial based on the Dick Tracy character, in which he is a G-Man
- List of film serials
- Law Enforcement Exploring
