= The Lady in the Morgue (film) =

- Theatrical release poster
- Directed by: Otis Garrett
- Screenplay by: Eric Taylor; Robertson White
- Based on: The Lady in the Morgue by Jonathan Latimer
- Produced by: Irving Starr
- Starring: Preston Foster; Patricia Ellis; Frank Jenks; Thomas E. Jackson; Wild Bill Elliott; Roland Drew; Barbara Pepper
- Cinematography: Stanley Cortez
- Edited by: Ted J. Kent
- Production companies: Crime Club Productions, Inc.
- Distributed by: Universal Pictures
- Release date: April 22, 1938
- Running time: 67 minutes
- Country: United States
- Language: English

The Lady in the Morgue is a 1938 American mystery film directed by Otis Garrett and written by Eric Taylor and Robertson White. It is based on the 1936 novel The Lady in the Morgue by Jonathan Latimer. The film stars Preston Foster, Patricia Ellis, Frank Jenks, Thomas E. Jackson, Wild Bill Elliott, Roland Drew and Barbara Pepper. The film was released on April 22, 1938, by Universal Pictures.

== Plot ==
Detective Bill Crane investigates the murder of the morgue keeper and the disappearance of a blond's dead body.

== Cast ==
- Preston Foster as Bill Crane
- Patricia Ellis as Mrs. Sam Taylor
- Frank Jenks as Doc Williams
- Thomas E. Jackson as Strom
- Wild Bill Elliott as Chauncey Courtland
- Roland Drew as Sam Taylor
- Barbara Pepper as Kay Renshaw
- Joe Downing as Steve Collins
- Archie Robbins as Frankie French
- Al Hill as Spitzy
- Morgan Wallace as Layman
- Brian Burke as Johnson
- Donald Kerr as Greening
- Don Brodie as Taxi Driver
- Rollo Lloyd as Coroner
- Gordon Hart as Colonel Black
- Ray Turner as Elevator Operator

== Production ==
In 1937, Universal Pictures made a deal with the Crime Club, who were published of whodunnits. Over the next few years Universal released several mystery films in the series. The film was the third in Universal's Crime Club series.

== Reception ==
From retrospective reviews, the authors of the book Universal Horrors stated that the film was a "confusing yarn" and that "all the ingredients for a crackerjack mystery thriller are here, but somewhere along the line, this inconsequential meller misses the mark."
