= Keep 'Em Slugging =

1943 film by Christy Cabanne

- Directed by: Christy Cabanne
- Written by: Brenda Weisberg (screenplay); Edward Handler (story); Robert Gordon (story)
- Produced by: Ben Pivar
- Starring: Dead End Kids and Little Tough Guys; Evelyn Ankers; Shemp Howard
- Cinematography: William A. Sickner
- Edited by: Ray Snyder
- Music by: Hans J. Salter; Frank Skinner
- Distributed by: Universal Pictures
- Release date: August 2, 1943
- Running time: 63 minutes
- Country: United States
- Language: English

Keep 'Em Slugging is a 1943 American film starring the Little Tough Guys and directed by Christy Cabanne for Universal Pictures.

== Plot ==
Summer vacation usually means that local teenagers will be working for crooked concessions at the carnival. Teenage gang leader Tommy Banning warns his own gang to stay away from the carnival, and take legitimate jobs to replace men who have gone to war. Unfortunately most gang members have criminal records for juvenile delinquency, and can't get jobs in the working world. When Tommy's sister Sheila asks her boss, Frank Moulton, at the Carruthers' department store where she works, he agrees to hire Tommy only if she goes on a date with him. Sheila won't do that, but her boyfriend Jerry Brady gets Tommy a job at the store. Tommy is smitten by salesgirl Suzanne Booker, and they go on a movie date together. At the theater, some of Tommy's gang (Pig, String, and Ape) turn up and noisily disrupt the movie. Soon enough Pig, String, and Ape all have jobs.

Moulton is in league with a gangster, Duke Rodman, who deals in stolen merchandise. Rodman is disappointed in Moulton for not giving him enough business. Moulton gives him the names of Tommy and his gang. After using glamour girl Lola Laverne as bait, Tommy meets with Rodman but won't steal goods from the department store. Moulton frames Tommy for stealing a piece of jewelry. Tommy goes to jail and his sister, in protest, quits her job. Jerry gets Tommy out of prison, but the Banning family still thinks he is guilty of the theft.

The gang learns that Rodman plans to rob a silk shipment at the department store. Tommy and the gang detain the Rodman gangsters with a fire hose until the police arrive. As a reward for catching the gang and stopping the robbery, Tommy gets Moulton's job at the store, the rest of the gang start working in the shipping department, and Jerry and Sheila reconcile.

== Cast ==
=== The Dead End Kids and Little Tough Guys ===
- Huntz Hall as Pig
- Bobby Jordan as Tommy Banning
- Gabriel Dell as String
- Norman Abbott as Ape

=== Additional cast ===
- Evelyn Ankers as Sheila Banning
- Mary Gordon as Mrs. Banning
- Frank Albertson as Frank Moulton, store executive
- Milburn Stone as Duke Rodman
- Don Porter as Jerry Brady
- Shemp Howard as Binky, soda jerk
- Samuel S. Hinds as Carruthers, store owner
- Elyse Knox as Suzanne Booker
- Ernie Adams as Dugan, concessionaire

== Production ==
Billy Halop and Bernard Punsly, resident stars of the Little Tough Guys series, were both drafted into the armed forces before the film went into production. Halop's ringleader role was reassigned to Bobby Jordan, and Bud Abbott's nephew Norman Abbott was recruited to replace Punsly. With Halop gone, Huntz Hall graduated to top billing for this one film. Similarly, co-star Don Porter was also drafted, but was allowed to complete the film.

David Durand, a member of the concurrent East Side Kids series, has a bit role in this film, and Jane Frazee and Robert Paige make uncredited appearances in the moviehouse film (a clip from the Ritz Brothers feature Hi'ya, Chum).

The director was Christy Cabanne, a silent-era veteran who was usually called upon to wrap up a fading series. Cabanne, working quickly, encouraged his cast to play for laughs and improvise when necessary. An idea of how quickly the picture was shot can be seen in a blooper that found its way into the finished film. When Jordan arrives home from jail, his sister (Ankers) rushes to hug him and trips on the carpet. The actors' reactions make it clear that this was not scripted, and Jordan, thinking quickly, ad-libs, "I been meaning to fix that rug."

Keep 'Em Slugging turned out to be the final film in Universal's Dead End Kids and Little Tough Guys series; two projects already scheduled for the gang were filmed later with other actors: the serial Adventures of the Flying Cadets and the feature film River Gang.
