= Sea Raiders =

1941 film by Ford Beebe, John Rawlins

- Theatrical poster
- Directed by: Ford Beebe; John Rawlins
- Written by: Clarence Upson Young; Paul Huston
- Produced by: Henry MacRae
- Starring: Billy Halop; Huntz Hall; Gabriel Dell; Bernard Punsly; Hal E. Chester
- Cinematography: William A. Sickner
- Edited by: Joseph Gluck; Patrick Kelley; Louis Sackin; Alvin Todd
- Music by: Milton Rosen
- Distributed by: Universal Pictures
- Release date: October 14, 1941
- Running time: 12 chapters (229 min)
- Country: United States
- Language: English

Sea Raiders is a 1941 Universal film serial starring the Dead End Kids and Little Tough Guys. This was the teen stars' second of three serials, between Junior G-Men (1940) and Junior G-Men of the Air (1942). Sea Raiders was the 52nd serial to be released by Universal (or the 120th if silent serials are counted). The plot concerns the heroes foiling Nazi attacks on American shipping.

== Plot ==
The Sea Raiders, a band of foreign agents, led by Carl Tonjes, and secretly by Elliott Carlton, blow up a freighter on which Billy Adams and Toby Nelson have stowed away to avoid Brack Warren, a harbor patrol officer assigned to guard a new type of torpedo boat built by Billy's brother, Tom Adams. Intended targets or not, getting blown up does not set well with Billy and Toby and, together with their gang coupled with the members of the Little Tough Guys, they find the Sea Raiders' island hideout, investigate the seacoast underground arsenal of these saboteurs, get blasted from the air, dragged to their doom, become victims of the storm, entombed in a tunnel and even periled by a panther before they don the uniforms of some captured Sea Raiders and board a yacht that serves as headquarters for the Raiders.

== Cast ==
=== The Dead End Kids and the Little Tough Guys ===
- Billy Halop as Billy Adams
- Huntz Hall as Toby Nelson
- Gabriel Dell as Bilge
- Bernard Punsly as Butch
- Hally Chester as Swab
- Joe Recht as Lug

=== Additional principal cast ===
- Reed Hadley as Carl Tonjes
- William Hall as Brack Warren
- Mary Field as Aggie Nelson
- John McGuire as Tom Adams
- Marcia Ralston as Leah Carlton
- Edward Keane as Elliott Carlton
- Stanley Blystone as Captain Olaf Nelson, chief henchman
- Richard Alexander as Henchman Jenkins
- Ernie Adams as Henchman Zeke

== Production ==
=== Stunts ===
- Bud Geary
- Eddie Parker doubling Eddie Dunn
- Tom Steele doubling Reed Hadley
- Dale Van Sickel
- Bud Wolfe doubling Richard Bond, Morgan Wallace & John McGuire
- Duke York doubling Huntz Hall

== Chapter titles ==
1. The Raider Strikes
2. Flaming Torture
3. The Tragic Crash
4. The Raider Strikes Again
5. Flames of Fury
6. Blasted from the Air
7. Victims of the Storm
8. Dragged to Their Doom
9. Battling the Sea Beast
10. Periled by a Panther
11. Entombed in the Tunnel
12. Paying the Penalty

_{Source:}
