= Federal Bureau of Investigation portrayal in media =

US FBI media coverage

The Federal Bureau of Investigation (FBI) has been a staple of American popular culture since its christening in 1935. That year also marked the beginning of the popular "G-Man" phenomenon that helped establish the Bureau's image, beginning with the aptly titled James Cagney movie, G Men. Although the detective novel and other police-related entertainment had long enthralled audiences, the FBI itself can take some of the credit for its media prominence. J. Edgar Hoover, the Bureau's "patriarch", took an active interest to ensure that it was not only well represented in the media, but also that the FBI was depicted in a heroic, positive light and that the message, "crime doesn't pay", was blatantly conveyed to audiences. The context, naturally, has changed profoundly since the 1930s "war on crime", and especially so since Hoover's death in 1972.

== The FBI's role ==
Any author, motion picture producer, or television script writer may consult with the FBI Office of Public Affairs about closed cases or their operations, services, or history. However, there is no requirement for the FBI to cooperate, and it does not edit or approve/disapprove fictional works. The Office of Public Affairs may, on a project-by-project basis, provide assistance to help ensure accuracy. Some filmmakers offer reasonably accurate presentations of the FBI's responsibilities, investigations, and procedures in their story lines, while others present their own interpretations or introduce fictional events, persons, or places for dramatic effect.

There have been many fiction and non-fiction portrayals of the Federal Bureau of Investigation, from which the following is only a small sample.

== Books ==
- In 1936, British crime writer Peter Cheyney introduced G Man Lemmy Caution in his novel, This Man Is Dangerous. Another novel featuring Caution is Can Ladies Kill? (1938).
- In 1956 the first pulp fiction novel about Jerry Cotton was published in Germany. Since then more than 2500 novels have been published and reached altogether a circulation of more than 850 million. The popular FBI agent was also the hero of nine German feature films, most of them starring the American actor George Nader.
- In many of Tom Clancy's books the FBI plays a major role.
- The 1963 book Undercover Cat, later adapted into the film That Darn Cat in 1965 and 1997, followed Agent Zeke Kelso as he teams up with teenage sisters Patti and Ingrid Randall and their cat, D.C., to solve the case of kidnapped bank teller Helen Jenkins.
- In 1986, Margaret Truman (daughter of former President Truman) wrote a novel titled Murder at the FBI, dealing with the murder of two FBI agents.
- Many characters in Thomas Harris' novels are Special Agents of the FBI, including protagonists Will Graham and Clarice Starling. Some of the serial killers in the novels, like Francis Dolarhyde and Jame Gumb, were loosely based on real serial killers pursued by the FBI, such as Ted Bundy.
- In Douglas Preston and Lincoln Child's Pendergast novels, the featured character Aloysius Pendergast is a Special Agent of the FBI.
- Gosho Aoyama's Detective Conan manga and anime has FBI agents involved in solving cases.
- A fictional division of the FBI, appears in SCP Foundation. As the Unusual Incidents Unit (UIU), a division created by the FBI and U.S Government during the cold war to contain and capture supernatural objects, locations and humanoids. Often appears as useless and a joke with the nicknames "Men In Black" and "UIUseless" in the SCP Foundation due to a decrease to funding after the Cold War and lack of suitable personnel.
- Michael Connelly's The Poet features the FBI's Behavior Sciences Unit hunting for the titular serial killer, with a focus on Special Agent Rachel Walling. Blood Work also features retired FBI profiler Terry McCaleb. Several other novels feature FBI agents and their interactions with main character LAPD detective Harry Bosch, often getting in his way, sometimes more justified than others.
- In the Alex Cross novels, the title character was in the FBI for six of the 20 novels.
- Paul Spike's secret history novel The Night Letter is set in 1940, depicting a three-cornered struggle between President Franklin D. Roosevelt, FBI director J. Edgar Hoover and agents of Nazi Germany, all seeking to gain possession of a photo showing the President in a compromising position with his secretary, Missy LeHand. Eventually the Nazis are defeated but Hoover gets the photo, putting him in a position to blackmail the President - whereupon Roosevelt engages in counter-blackmail, obtaining a photo showing Hoover in a compromising position with a handsome young FBI agent...
- Several science fiction works depicted a dystopian United States, set in a future time or an Alternative History timeline, in which the FBI develops into a full-fledged secret police acting without any legal restraint:
  - They Shall Have Stars, the first volume in James Blish's Cities in Flight series, is set in a 2013 in which the Soviet Union still exists and the Cold War is still ongoing; Western civil liberties have been eroded more and more, until society eventually resembles the Soviet model. The book's main villain is Francis X. MacHinery, hereditary Director of the FBI.
  - A large part of The Coming of the Quantum Cats by Frederik Pohl is set in an Alternative History in which a dictatorial US is dominated by Fundamentalist Christians and the FBI is a greatly feared secret police. The book's male protagonist is arrested and mistreated by an FBI agent who is beautiful but harsh and cruel - though at the end she is reformed, leaves the FBI and marries him.
  - In one of the Alternative History timelines depicted in Richard C. Meredith's No Brother, No Friend, the FBI and its "quasi-official auxiliary, the KKK" are involved in establishing large-scale "Detention Centers" for Black Americans.
  - In Eric Norden's The Ultimate Solution, depicting an Alternative History in which Nazi Germany won The Second World War and the US is ruled by the Nazis, the FBI is taken over by the Gestapo and becomes its North American branch.
  - In contradiction to the above, in the 2004 of Poul Anderson's Un-Man, a component of his Psychotechnic League future history, the dictatorial "Americanist Party" takes over the US but finds the FBI recalcitrant and unready to cooperate in hunting down its opponents; therefore, the new regime bypasses the FBI and sets up a new "American Security Service". By the time of the series's next story, "The Sensitive Man", the Americanist regime had fallen and its secret police dismantled, and the FBI resumes its role as a respectable, law abiding agency, with an FBI agent acting as a crucial ally to the story's protagonist.

== Films ==
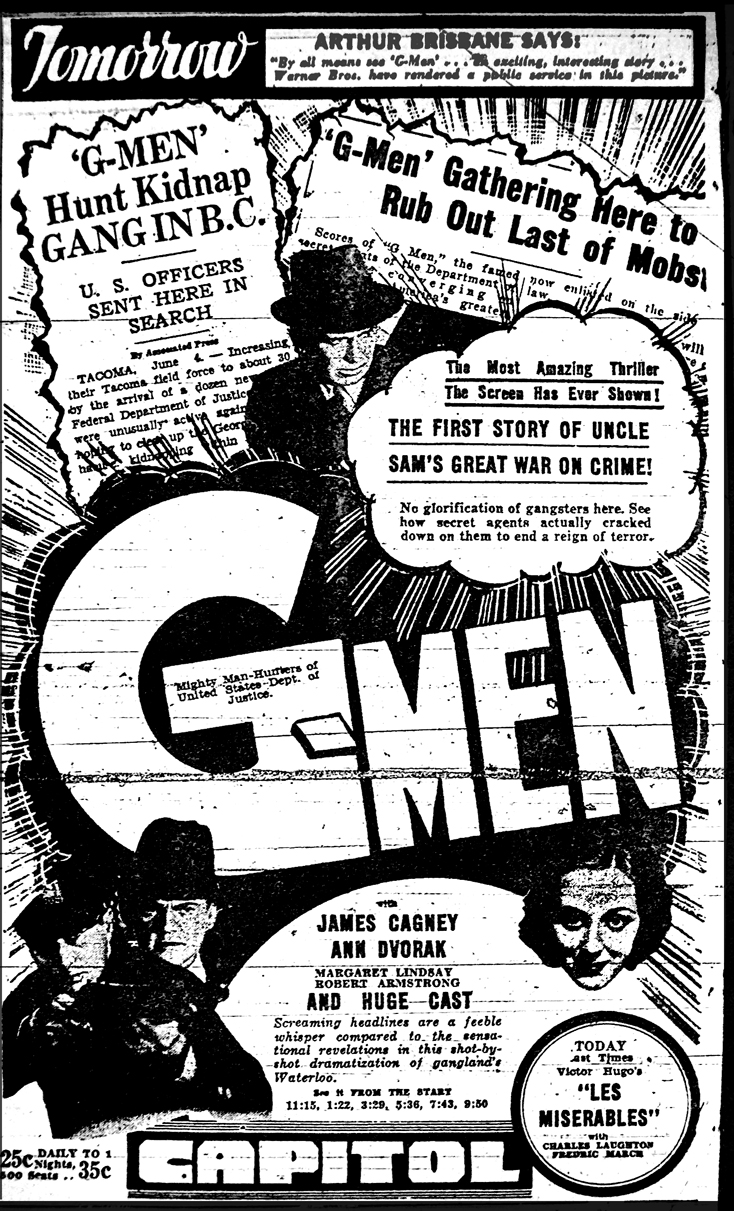
1935 newspaper ad for G Men proclaims: "Screaming headlines are a feeble whisper compared to the sensational revelations in this shot-by-shot dramatization of gangland's Waterloo."

- Warner Brothers' G Men (1935) was a deliberate attempt to rehabilitate crime movies by transforming the "gangster movie", wherein criminal protagonists were shown as leading exciting, affluent lives and living above the law, into stories where the heroic G-Man, or FBI agent, triumphs against the nefarious criminal underworld. The title of the movie is from a term allegedly coined by Machine Gun Kelly and appropriated by J. Edgar Hoover as a name for his federal agents that would strike fear in the hearts of criminals. According to the FBI's own history, Machine Gun Kelly "was caught without a machine gun in his hands and cringed before the federal agents and pleaded, 'Don't shoot, G-Men! Don't shoot, G-Men!'" James Cagney was recruited for the lead role as the well educated and incorruptible Brick Davis. G Men was essentially intended as a corrective to the film that catapulted Cagney to fame, The Public Enemy (1931). Just as he adopted G-Man as a badge of honor for his men, J. Edgar Hoover also attempted to re-invent the "Public Enemy" label by referring to the most notorious criminals as "public rat number one".
- The G-Men concept was extended in the 1940s to include the Junior G-Men film serials. The Dead End Kids, a group of wisecracking New York City street toughs who appeared in numerous films, were transformed into amateur detectives, helping the FBI solve cases.
- Walk East on Beacon! (1952), produced by Columbia Pictures and starring George Murphy, portrays the activities of the Bureau in their hunt for Communist spies in Boston. Released during the height of 1950s anti-Communist hysteria in the United States, the film's pedantic narrative, its presentation in the style of a documentary, and its basis in a story written by J. Edgar Hoover himself and published in Reader's Digest, indicates it is blatant propaganda.
- Samuel Fuller's Pickup on South Street (1953) aroused the ire of J. Edgar Hoover, who met with Fuller and Darryl F. Zanuck of 20th Century Fox to express his disapproval of many aspects of the film. Zanuck refused to make the changes Hoover demanded, and consequently, the advertising for the film had to remove all references to the F.B.I.
- The FBI Story (1959), produced by Warner Bros. and director Mervyn LeRoy, relates the history of the FBI from the point of view of a fictitious character, Chip Hardesty (played by James Stewart). FBI chief J. Edgar Hoover served as consultant on this film, which forced director LeRoy to reshoot several scenes that did not meet with the FBI's approval.
- Producer Robert Evans claimed that during production of The President's Analyst (1967), he was visited by FBI Special Agents who told him that due to its unflattering depiction of the FBI, the Bureau wanted the film altered or canceled. However, Evans refused either to stop or to make changes to The President's Analyst. Only when pressure came from his studio did he change the FBI to the FBR and CIA to CEA by redubbing the voice track. Evans believed his telephone was monitored by the Bureau from then on.
- Disney's That Darn Cat, based on the 1963 book Undercover Cat, follows Agent Zeke Kelso as he teams up with teenager Patti Randall and her titular pet cat, D.C., to solve a kidnapping case. The 1965 film had Kelso portrayed by Dean Jones, Patti by Hayley Mills, and Grayson Hall portraying the victim, a bank teller kidnapped by two robbers (Frank Gorshin and Neville Brand). The 1997 remake had Kelso portrayed by Doug E. Doug, Patti by Christina Ricci, and Rebecca Koon portraying the victim, the housekeeper of a wealthy couple (Dean Jones and Dyan Cannon), whom the kidnappers (Rebecca Schull and Peter Boyle) mistook for the wife in an effort to obtain a ransom.
- FEDS (1988), starring Rebecca De Mornay alongside Mary Gross, although a comedy, provides insight into how women train at the FBI Academy. This movie had a limited release and could only be found on VHS as of August 2009.
- Mississippi Burning (1988) is a fictionalized account of the investigation into an actual civil rights murder case, the murders of three civil rights workers in the state of Mississippi in 1964.
- The Silence of the Lambs (1991), starring Jodie Foster as FBI Trainee Clarice Starling in pursuit of serial killer Buffalo Bill, aided by the cannibalistic serial killer Dr. Hannibal Lecter (played by Anthony Hopkins), is a movie sequel to Manhunter (1986), the first film adaptation of the 1981 Red Dragon. The 1991 film received five Academy Awards, including Best Film, Best Director, Best Actor for Hopkins, and Best Actress for Jodie Foster, and spawned another sequel, Hannibal (2001), and a remake of Red Dragon (2002) starring Edward Norton and Harvey Keitel.
- Point Break (1991) is the story of an undercover FBI agent Johnny Utah, who is sanctioned by the FBI to learn surfing in order to infiltrate a gang of thieves.
- Twin Peaks: Fire Walk with Me (1992), a prequel/sequel to the television series Twin Peaks, includes the character Special Agent Dale Cooper as well as several other FBI agents, but to a more limited degree than in the television series.
- Michael Apted directed Incident at Oglala (1992), a documentary about the deaths of FBI agents Jack R. Coler and Ronald A. Williams on the Pine Ridge Indian Reservation in the summer of 1975, in conjunction with the movie Thunderheart (1992).
- Panther (1995) portrays the FBI in a negative fashion as a crooked and racist organization that interacted with the Mafia to subdue the Black Panther Party.
- Donnie Brasco (1997) is based on the true story of undercover FBI agent Joseph D. Pistone's infiltrating the mafia.
- Face/Off (1997) stars John Travolta as FBI special agent Sean Archer, who must undergo a surgery that gives him the face of ruthless terrorist Castor Troy (Nicolas Cage) in order to stop a bomb planted by Castor from leveling Los Angeles. However, things go wrong when Castor wakes up from his coma and steals Archer's face, then begins to implant himself in Archer's family and job.
- Home Alone 3 (1997) portrayed the Bureau pursuing four internationally wanted spies (Olek Krupa, Lenny Von Dohlen, Rya Kihlstedt and David Thornton) working for a North Korean terrorist group searching the Chicago area neighborhood of eight-year-old Alex Pruitt (Alex D. Linz) for a $10-million top-secret missile-cloaking microchip they stole from a defense department contractor hidden inside a remote controlled toy car, which, following a baggage mix-up at the San Francisco airport while going through the security checkpoint, landed in the hands of his elderly neighbor, Mrs. Hess (Marian Seldes), who gives him the toy as payment for shoveling her driveway. While recovering from the chickenpox, Alex reports the burglars twice in two days, but the police and his family won't believe his story due to them having fled the crime scenes in time, forcing him to take matters into his own hands. It is after Alex finds the chip hidden in the car and reports it to the Air Force, who in turn, report it to Stuckey (Christopher Curry), the FBI agent in charge of the case—as well as the spies learning he has the chip and plan to hit his home next, only to suffer numerous injuries from the booby traps he implemented for them—do the authorities and his family finally believe him.
- The Siege (1998), starring Denzel Washington, Tony Shalhoub, Annette Bening and Bruce Willis, is based on the FBI's modern efforts to crack down on terrorism and gives a hypothetical idea of what would happen if there were a series of consecutive terrorist attacks in New York City. The ideas in the plot would ultimately come true with the 9/11 attacks.
- The X-Files: Fight the Future (1998) follows agents Fox Mulder and Dana Scully.
- Final Destination (2000) features FBI agents interrogating high school graduate Alex Browning (Devon Sawa) after Alex foresees a mysterious plane explosion. Later in the franchise, the fifth film Final Destination 5 (2011) features another FBI agent, Jim Block (Courtney B. Vance), interrogating and following Sam Lawton after a deadly suspension bridge collapse.
- The Adventures of Rocky and Bullwinkle (2000) has rookie FBI agent Karen Sympathy (Piper Perabo) joining forces with the titular squirrel (June Foray) and moose (Keith Scott) when their adversaries, Boris (Keith Scott; animated/Jason Alexander; live-action), Natasha (June Foray; animated/Rene Russo; live-action) and Fearless Leader (Keith Scott; animated/Robert De Niro; live-action) make their way out of the cartoon universe into the real world and plot to use their new television network RBTV (Really Bad Television) to brainwash the nation into electing Fearless Leader as President of the United States. Karen enlists the moose and squirrel team's help to not only foil Fearless Leader's plan, but to rescue her captured fellow agents, who have been transformed by the latter into helpless, mindless vegetables to power his broadcasting machine.
- Red Dragon (2002), a prequel to The Silence of the Lambs (1991), stars Edward Norton as FBI profiler, agent Will Graham, and Anthony Hopkins reprising his role as Dr. Hannibal Lecter.
- Austin Powers in Goldmember follows Austin Power's love interest, Foxy Cleopatra, who is an undercover FBI agent that is determined to solve the murder of her partner.
- Club Dread (2004) stars M. C. Gainey as the retired director of FBI's Homicide department, who serves as the bodyguard to Resort owner Peter Wabash, AKA Coconut Pete (Bill Paxton).
- White Chicks (2004) features brothers Marcus and Kevin Copeland (Marlon and Shawn Wayans) who are FBI agent partners. The two agents are assigned to protect two young women from a dangerous kidnapper, but a car accident forces the two agents to masquerade as the two young girls to capture the kidnapper.
- Snakes on a Plane (2006) stars Samuel L. Jackson as FBI Special Agent Neville Flynn, whose mission is to protect surfer Sean Jones (Nathan Phillips) from being assassinated by crime lord Eddie Kim (Byron Lawson) while en route to have him deliver a crucial testimony in Los Angeles. Wanting to avoid prison time and a potential death sentence, Kim and his gang unleash a swarm of deadly snakes aboard the plane, targeting Jones, Flynn and the other passengers.
- The films Saw IV (2007), Saw V (2008), and Saw VI (2009) featured three agents (Peter Strahm, Lindsey Perez, and Dan Erickson), all of them falling victim to the Jigsaw Killer.
- Untraceable (2008) stars Diane Lane as an FBI Cyber Crimes agent who is after a serial killer who hooks his victims up to machines set up to where the speed in which his victims die, corresponds to the number of views the live internet stream of the victims receives.
- The Indian movie New York (2009) depicts an innocent student who is detained arbitrarily by the FBI and is severely tortured for nine months.
- Public Enemies (2009) is a partially fictionalized account of the BOI's pursuit of John Dillinger, starring Johnny Depp as Dillinger and Christian Bale as Melvin Purvis.
- In Time (2011) portrays a futuristic version of the FBI, whose mission is to hunt down a poor young laborer, Will Silas, whom they believe murdered an extremely wealthy elderly businessman, Henry Hamilton. In this film, the FBI are known as the Timekeepers instead of Agents.
- Tower Heist (2011) involves a Ponzi scheme based on the infamous former financier Bernard Madoff. The film follows FBI Special Agent Claire Denham (Téa Leoni) as she investigates a Ponzi scheme orchestrated by Wall Street fat cat Arthur Shaw (Alan Alda), which also involves the employees and other tenants of the apartment building he lives in, including the building manager, Josh Kovacs (Ben Stiller). With Shaw placed under house arrest in his penthouse apartment, Kovacs enlists help from his coworkers (Casey Affleck, Michael Pena, Gabourey Sidibe and Stephen McKinley Henderson), a bankrupt Wall Street investor who was a former tenant of the tower (Matthew Broderick) and a former classmate turned petty thief (Eddie Murphy) to lure Shaw and Denham out with a fake Thanksgiving Day court date in an effort to break into the penthouse and find the stolen money.
- American Hustle (2013) portrays a fictionalized version of the ABSCAM operation, with special agents portrayed by Bradley Cooper and Louis C.K.
- The Heat follows Sandra Bullock as Sarah Ashburn, an FBI agent from New York City, who is assigned a mission in Boston in hopes of landing a promotion and teams with a foul mouthed Boston detective (Melissa McCarthy).
- The Wolf of Wall Street (2013) is based on the criminal stock broker, Jordan Belfort, and his arrest by the FBI.
- Sicario (2015) portrays FBI Special Agents Kate Macer (Emily Blunt) and Reggie Wayne (Daniel Kaluuya), who work alongside CIA SAC officer Matt Graver (Josh Brolin), and his team in a covert operation against the members and leaders of the Mexican Cartels.
- Mark Felt: The Man Who Brought Down the White House (2017) is based on Mark Felt, the FBI administrator who became the informant Deep Throat during the events and reporting of the Watergate scandal in the mid-1970s.
- The 2011 film J. Edgar follows the founder of the FBI, J. Edgar Hoover being portrayed by Leonardo DiCaprio.

== Radio ==
- One early portrayal of the G-Men image was a 1935 radio program produced in collaboration with J. Edgar Hoover titled G-Men. Hoover wished to depict the FBI's successes as the product of teamwork rather than the heroics of individual agents. His concept, however, did not translate well into mass entertainment. The show was soon re-conceptualized and renamed Gang Busters, and was quite successful, with a 21-year run and spin-offs as a movie serial in the 1940s, a big little book, a DC Comics comic book, and a television series in the 1950s.

Two other popular radio shows based on the activities of the Bureau were:

- The FBI in Peace and War and
- This is Your FBI, a Bureau-approved series.
- Radio station WGY (Schenectady, NY) ran a locally-written and locally produced program named The FBI in Action, which ran from 1945 to 1955. The program had the support of J. Edgar Hoover. According to Martha Brooks (née Irma Lemke Forman), a WGY employee from 1931 to 1971, no attempt was made to network the program outside of the New York's Capital District Area because the sponsors did not wish to pay the actors' salaries for network programs, which were higher than the actor's salaries for local programs.

== Tabletop gaming ==
- The FBI appears thoroughly in the horror roleplaying game Delta Green, mostly as a character profession. Delta Green employs a large amounts of FBI agents, as they have deep training, specialized skills, advanced forensics and jurisdiction not only in the whole of the United States, but also a large presence overseas. The 2016 Agent's Handbook give options to player characters to be members of the CID, NSB, the Intelligence and Operations Support Section (IOSS) and the HRT. The game also advises for Gamemasters to use a Joint Terrorism Task Force as a cover that Delta Green uses for its covert operations and as a way to justify players from different law enforcement agencies to work together.
  - The FBI also appears in the Vietnam War spin-off The Fall of DELTA GREEN, offering player character professions of Special Agent, Laboratory Researcher, Undercover agent and a Domestic Intelligence Division "Black bagger".
- In the Chronicles of Darkness roleplaying game Hunter: The Vigil, the FBI has a fictional unit known as the Vanguard Serial Crimes Unit, or VASCU, which specializes in hunting down supernatural serial killers.

== Television ==
- In 1965, Warner Bros. Television produced a long-running television series called The F.B.I., based in part on concepts from their 1959 film The FBI Story. The series, which ran until 1974, was taken from actual FBI cases, told through the eyes of fictitious agent Lewis Erskine (played by Efrem Zimbalist Jr.). Epilogues to most episodes included Zimbalist stepping out of character to warn viewers of the FBI's "Ten Most Wanted Fugitives", years before the premiere of Fox's America's Most Wanted. After the show was cancelled, WB TV continued to produce TV movies based on the FBI. Recent disclosures of memos by the FBI under the Freedom of Information Act reveal that the real FBI had casting control over the show. Both Bette Davis and Robert Blake were banned from appearing, citing "conflicting political" differences on crime in general. In 1981, the show was completely revived with entirely new cast and production crew as Today's F.B.I., with Mike Connors, but it lasted only one season. A remake of the original series, also called The F.B.I., was planned by Imagine Entertainment for airing on the Fox network for the Fall of 2008, but as of August 2009, it had not yet been produced.
- The CBS television series Wiseguy (1987–1990) featured agent Vinnie Terranova as an undercover operative infiltrating the mafia and other criminal organizations for a fictional "Organized Crime Bureau" of the FBI in a series of story arcs. The series focused on the mechanics of being undercover and the psychological impact of undercover work on the agent.
- From February 3, 1989 to April 14, 1989 the television series Unsub featured an elite FBI forensic team that investigates serial murderers and other violent crimes.
- Several television shows have cast a more unconventional portrayal of the FBI as an agency that specializes in unconventional and paranormal crimes and investigative techniques.
  - From 1990 to 1991, the television series Twin Peaks featured the fictitious FBI Special Agent Dale Cooper, beginning with the investigation of the murder of small-town homecoming queen Laura Palmer, and included repeated references to the FBI. This show has numerous paranormal events and Agent Cooper often uses dreams to investigate crimes.
  - Another show that cast a paranormal theme on the FBI was The X-Files. From 1993 to 2002, the popular television series concerned investigations into paranormal phenomena by five fictional characters known as Special Agents Dana Scully, Fox Mulder (whose actor, David Duchovny, coincidentally played a government agent in Twin Peaks), John Doggett, Monica Reyes, and Assistant Director Walter Skinner. This also spawned two feature films; The X-Files: Fight The Future in 1998 and The X-Files: I Want to Believe in 2008. The Fox TV network ran a six-episode reboot of the X-Files (Season 10) which started in January, 2016. In April 2017, the Fox TV network announced a new 10-episode mini-series (Season 11). Production is to start in the Summer of 2017, and the episodes are to air during the 2017–2018 season.
  - In Monday 1997, Buffy the Vampire Slayer season 1 episode: "Out of Mind, Out of Sight", the two FBI agents Doyle and Manetti take Marcie into custody.
  - In September 2008, Fox premiered Fringe, created by Lost producer J. J. Abrams. The series is similar to The X-Files, as Special Agent Olivia Dunham, along with Peter Bishop and his father Dr. Walter Bishop, investigate paranormal phenomena, similar to that of The X Files.
- 1998 to 2005, The FBI Files was hosted by Jim Kallstrom, a former head of FBI's New York Office. It is currently aired on Escape TV.
- As described in "FBI on The Sopranos", a major plotline on the fictional HBO drama, The Sopranos, has been the Federal Bureau of Investigation's (FBI's) ongoing pursuit of the Dimeo (New Jersey) and Lupertazzi (Brooklyn) crime families. The Bureau's investigations have met with varying degrees of success.
- Beginning in 2001, the fictional Counter Terrorist Unit (CTU) agency in the TV drama 24 works with, and is patterned closely after, the FBI Counterterrorism Division.
- A canceled show, Standoff, had premiered about negotiators in the Critical Incident Response Group (CIRG). *As of August 2009, America's Most Wanted was still showing profiles of people on the FBI Ten Most Wanted Fugitives list.
- Beginning in 2003, Lifetime Network showed its three-year television show Missing. The show began as 1-800 Missing but starting Season 2, the "1-800" was taken off.
- In 2005, Fox aired Bones, a forensics and police procedural drama that pairs an FBI Special Agent Seeley Booth with forensic anthropologist Dr. Temperance Brennan. Each episode focuses on an FBI case file, depicting both the forensic analysis of human remains at the fictional Jeffersonian Institute and the investigative role of the FBI agency. In the show, the FBI defers to Dr. Brennan and the scientists of the Medico-Legal lab at the Jeffersonian when the corpse is too decomposed, burned or damaged to identify using standard identification procedures.
- In 2002, Pax TV aired Sue Thomas: F.B.Eye, based on the real life of and about the world's first deaf FBI agent of the show's title. The show ran until 2005, producing 57 episodes.
- Without a Trace (launched in 2002 on CBS) follows a fictional FBI missing persons unit in New York City.
- An episode of Invader Zim, "FBI Warning of Doom", after Zim finds an "FBI Warning" on the rental movie GIR watches, he takes the DVD back to the mall to return the disc and avoid the wrath of the FBI.
- Numb3rs (launched in 2005) follows FBI agents who collaborate with a mathematics professor, who is the brother of the Lead Special Agent in Los Angeles
- Criminal Minds (launched in 2005 on CBS) follows agents of the FBI's Behavioral Analysis Unit (BAU).
- Smith (2006 on CBS) is a short-lived drama wherein FBI agents pursue a group of professional thieves.
- NCIS and its spin-off, NCIS: Los Angeles deal primarily with the Naval Criminal Investigative Service often feature FBI collaboration and/or good-natured jurisdictional arguments.
- The 2007 Spike TV series The Kill Point featured the FBI in early episodes, one agent being fatally wounded in a shootout with the antagonists and another briefly taking over the role of primary negotiator in the ensuing hostage situation.
- The FBI is prominent in the seventh season of 24.
- The 2009 A&E Original Series The Beast (13 episodes, January - April 2009) was about two FBI agents, a new rookie and a veteran officer, starring Patrick Swayze and Travis Fimmel.
- In 2009, the USA Network launched a new show called White Collar, which features con-artist Neal Caffrey working with an FBI white-collar crime unit as a consultant, led by his old nemesis, Peter Burke.
- In 2013, Fox aired The Following, which features retired FBI agent Ryan Hardy return to duty to help find and combat a cult of killers led by his nemesis Joe Carrol.
- In the Showtime series Ray Donovan, the FBI plays a major role in investigating Ray and his associates. This is particularly evident in season 2.
- In the later half the sixth season of CBS's The Mentalist and the seventh season, the program's lead characters became members of the FBI. Prior to this, the characters had worked for a fictionalized version of the California Bureau of Investigation and had at times come into conflict with the FBI.
- The Blacklist, a crime thriller premiered on NBC features an FBI unit working with a high-profile criminal, who voluntarily surrenders to the FBI after eluding capture for decades.
- The NBC series Blindspot features an FBI team which solves criminal cases by deciphering clues from tattoos found on the body of a mysterious amnesiac woman.
- The ABC television series Quantico (2015–2018) follows a group of FBI recruits at the FBI Training Academy in Quantico, Virginia.
- In the CW's television series Supernatural (2005–present), the two main characters Sam and Dean Winchester frequently pose as FBI agents in their hunting trips.
- The Netflix series Mindhunter (2017–present) is set in the 1970s and portrays the inception of criminal psychology and criminal profiling at FBI's Behavioral Analysis Unit.
- The FBI play an integral role in the third season of Daredevil. Wilson Fisk (Vincent D'Onofrio) manipulates his way out of prison by turning informant for the FBI on an Albanian gang, ostensibly in the name of protecting his girlfriend Vanessa Marianna (Ayelet Zurer) from criminal charges. After paying Jasper Evans to shank him and make it seem like he is being targeted for snitching, Fisk gets the FBI to move him to the Presidential Hotel, a Manhattan hotel that he secretly owns through a series of shell companies. He is able to pull this off because he has bribed, manipulated, blackmail almost every agent on the detail into doing his dirty work. This allows him to use the FBI to strongarm other gangs in New York City into paying him a protection tax, as well as harass and hound his enemies who trying to investigate him. Two of the FBI agents on the detail are series regulars for the season, and integral pawns in Fisk's schemes.
  - The first agent is Benjamin "Dex" Poindexter (Wilson Bethel), an FBI SWAT sniper with a troubled past who saves Fisk from an assassination attempt while being transported from the prison to the Presidential Hotel. Through subtle manipulation, Fisk convinces Dex to dress up in a Daredevil costume created by Melvin Potter and has him attack the New York Bulletin to discredit Matt Murdock's and Karen Page's reputations, as well as eliminate Jasper Evans. Later in the season, Fisk tasks Dex with killing Karen to avenge her murder of James Wesley (Toby Leonard Moore), and while Matt and Karen foil his attack, Father Lantom is killed protecting Karen. Dex proves to be part of Fisk's undoing, as he is sent to kill Ray Nadeem on Vanessa's orders after Fisk prevents a grand jury from indicting him with Nadeem's testimony. Subsequently, Matt finds out from Fisk's fixer Felix Manning (Joe Jones) that Fisk ordered the murder of Julie Barnes, a woman Dex has a crush on, and uses this information to turn Dex against Fisk.
  - The second agent is Ray Nadeem (Jay Ali), a down on his luck agent in the New York office who has been a pawn of Fisk's for three years without even knowing him. Fisk cuts off his sister-in-law's medical insurance, forcing Nadeem to pay her medical bills and go into crippling debt, ruining his FICO score and delaying hopes of career advancement. When Nadeem visits Fisk in prison and Fisk informs on the Albanians to him, Nadeem readily accepts Fisk's information and his terms of relocation without considering the repercussions. Fisk takes advantage of Nadeem's pride to manipulate him into going after the members of Nelson & Murdock for ostensibly doing Fisk's dirty work. While he eventually realizes he's been played after Jasper Evans' death, it is too late for him to back out and he ends up being blackmailed by his boss Tammy Hattley (Kate Udall) into working with Dex to enforce Fisk's protection tax, and serves as a getaway driver during Dex's attempt on Karen. A conversation with Matt's mother Sister Maggie (Joanne Whalley) convinces Nadeem to grow a spine and stand up to Dex, by arranging with Foggy Nelson and Detective Brett Mahoney for Karen to be "apprehended" by the NYPD. Fisk attempts to kill Nadeem and his family right away, but Matt and Foggy rescue him and convince him to testify before a grand jury convened by District Attorney Blake Tower. Fisk foils their efforts by intimidating the grand jury. Nadeem flees back home and makes a video confession to everything he's witnessed before Dex shows up at his house to murder him on Vanessa's orders. The video, as his dying declaration, is considered thanks to a legal loophole to be credible evidence that allows the NYPD to arrest Fisk and put him back in prison.
- In The Defenders, the FBI and NYPD are summoned after Jessica Jones uncovers a stash of bombmaking equipment in a seedy apartment. Jessica is uncooperative with the FBI agent taking her statement and hastily leaves the scene, but not before Detective Misty Knight catches her stealing evidence.
- Limitless, a 2015 CBS television drama series based on the 2011 film, features a young struggling musician who is introduced to a mysterious drug, giving him access to full potential of his brain. With his enhanced abilities he helps the FBI track down criminals and solve hard cases.
- In the 2018 series Deception, a magician by the name of Cameron Black teams up with a group of FBI agents to help free his convicted brother, Jonathan Black, who was framed for murder.
- In 2017, Gone started airing on ABC and It centers on FBI Agents working in a Special Task Force that handles Abduction and Missing person cases.
- During the fall of 2018, a TV series called FBI started airing which follows a team of FBI agents in the New York FBI office as they solve new cases during each episode.
- On January 7, 2020, FBI: Most Wanted, a spinoff of FBI, premiered on CBS, It follows a team of special agents in the FBI's Fugitive Task Force, a division charged with apprehending fugitives on the Top Ten Most Wanted List.
- FBI personnel form a major part of the Rush Hour movies.
- FBI and CIA personnel are present in James Bond film Licence to Kill.

== Video games ==
- In the video game Call of Cthulhu: Dark Corners of the Earth, the protagonist assists former FBI director J. Edgar Hoover as well as other members of the agency in destroying the Cult of Cthulhu in a major plot point of the game.
- In Call of Duty: Black Ops II, the FBI is a playable faction in the multiplayer mode, opposing the Mercs on certain maps. All members wear masks and tactical gear and have access to the same arsenal as other military factions in the game. They are also mentioned in the single-player campaign.
- In Counter-Strike: Global Offensive, the FBI is one of the counter-terrorist factions.
- In Deadly Premonition, the main protagonist is an eccentric FBI profiler named Francis York Morgan.
- The game Destroy All Humans! features a parody of 1950s-era FBI agents, known as Majestics, who will come after the player if they cause too much mayhem. They wield the same technology as the alien protagonist, Crypto.
- The character G-Man from the Half-Life series is so named for his resemblance to a stereotypical member of the FBI (suit, tie and briefcase) as well as his strange demeanor and conspiratorial nature.
- In the Grand Theft Auto series, the FBI is one of the law enforcement agencies that will pursue the player once they reach a five-star wanted level, driving black SUVs or town cars. FBI agents also appear as enemies in certain missions, and they are portrayed as wearing black ties, white shirts, and blue jackets with the letters "FBI" on the back. Beginning with Grand Theft Auto IV, the agency's name was changed to the Federal Investigation Bureau (FIB), a nod towards the Bureau's internal corruption.
- In the video game Heavy Rain, one of the four main characters is Norman Jayden (played by Leon Ockenden), an FBI profiler who uses ARI (Added Reality Interface) to investigate crime scenes.
- In Hitman: Blood Money, FBI agents appear wearing black suits and ties, sunglasses, and Bluetooth headsets.
- The video game Red Dead Redemption, set in 1911, features the Bureau of Investigation (BOI), the precursor to the FBI. In the game, Bureau agents commit the "justified" murders of outlaws in order to "tame" the Wild West.
- In the survival horror RPG Parasite Eve 2, the protagonist Aya Brea has been promoted from an NYPD detective to an FBI agent working for MIST, a unit specialized in combating genetically mutated creatures. Throughout the game, she uncovers a genetic conspiracy involving mitochondrial DNA.
- In the Saints Row series, the FBI will pursue the player once they reach the maximum wanted level. FBI agents drive black SUVs with sirens and lights, and they wear all-black suits while carrying assault rifles and combat pistols.
- In the video game The Godfather, the protagonist can bribe FBI agents to target rival Mafia families instead of their own.
- In Payday 2, the FBI (renamed to the Federal Bureau of Intervention) appear as one of the main antagonists, with both FBI agents and SWAT troops serving as enemies on the Very Hard and Overkill difficulties.

== See also ==
- List of fictional espionage organizations
- List of intelligence agencies
- List of intelligence agencies of the United Kingdom
- List of police television dramas
- LAPD in popular culture
- NYPD list of fictional portrayals
- Royal Canadian Mounted Police Popular awareness
- Seattle PD in popular culture
