= Can Ladies Kill? =

1938 crime novel

- Cover of the first edition
- Author: Peter Cheyney
- Language: English
- Series: Lemmy Caution #4
- Genre: Crime novel
- Publisher: William Collins
- Publication date: 1938
- Publication place: United Kingdom
- Media type: Print (Hardback)

Can Ladies Kill? is a crime novel by British author Peter Cheyney first published in 1938 by William Collins, Sons & Co. Ltd. Set in San Francisco and featuring Cheyney's creation, G-Man Lemmy Caution, it belongs to the hardboiled school of crime writing.

The novel is the fourth title of Cheyney's series of novels that featured the FBI agent Lemmy Caution. The narrative is described as one that focused on the forensic detail of violent death in a period when the readers were fascinated by sensational murder and the emerging science of detection. It is characterized by the British author's attempt to write in a purely American vein and features the cynicism and graphic violence that are present in the Caution books.

Can Ladies Kill? and the other narratives in the Caution series cemented Cheyney's position as one of the most popular storytellers of his time, serving as an interesting example of the author's skill for breakneck pace, colorful characterization, wit, and intricacy of plotting.

== Read on ==
- Jonathan Latimer: The Lady in the Morgue (1936) (another female body in another mortuary)
- Raymond Chandler: Farewell, My Lovely (1940) (changing identities)
- Vera Caspary: Bedelia (1945) (wicked woman / femme fatale)
- Mickey Spillane: I, the Jury (1947) (vigilantism / bypassing due process of law)

== See also ==
- FBI portrayal in the media
