= Adventures of the Flying Cadets =

1943 film by Ray Taylor, Lewis D. Collins

- Directed by: Lewis D. Collins; Ray Taylor
- Written by: George H. Plympton; Paul Huston
- Story by: Morgan Cox
- Produced by: Henry MacRae
- Starring: Johnny Downs; Robert Armstrong; Bobby Jordan; Ward Wood; Billy Benedict; Eduardo Ciannelli; Regis Toomey; Jennifer Holt
- Cinematography: William A. Sickner (credited as William Sickner)
- Edited by: Irving Birnbaum; Carl Himm; Alvin Todd; Edgar Zane
- Production company: Universal Pictures
- Distributed by: Universal Pictures
- Release date: September 7, 1943
- Running time: 13 chapters (265 minutes)
- Country: United States
- Language: English

Adventures of the Flying Cadets is a 13-episode 1943 Universal film serial directed by Ray Taylor and Lewis D. Collins.

== Plot ==
Flying students Danny Collins (Johnny Downs), "Jinx" Roberts (Bobby Jordan), "Scrapper" McKay (Ward Wood), and "Zombie" Parker (Billy Benedict) are suspected of a series of murders perpetrated by engineer, Arthur Galt (Robert Armstrong) operating as a Nazi agent known as the Black Hangman. He has disposed of several people who accompanied him on an expedition which located lost helium deposits in Africa.

Galt has also imprisoned the remaining members of the expedition, Professor Mason (Selmer Jackson) and his daughter Andre (Jennifer Holt). Galt plans to sell the helium to Germany through a Gestapo ring headed by Kurt von Heiger (Eduardo Ciannelli). The four students, believing Galt to be an ally, fly with him to Africa as they hope to track down Von Heiger, thinking he is the Black Hangman, and clear their own names on the charges of murder. The four are pursued to Africa by U.S. Army Intelligence officer Captain Ralph Carson (Regis Toomey).

The boys survive a tailspin and upon landing, take Galt into custody but momentarily he convinces authorities that he is innocent. When he tries to contact other Nazi agents, he is revealed to be their ring leader. The cadets are vindicated and receive Air Force Wings as they prepare to join Allied pilots going off to war.

== Chapter titles ==
1. The Black Hangman Strikes
2. Menaced by Murderers
3. Into the Flames
4. The Door to Death
5. Crashed in a Crater
6. Rendezvous with Doom
7. Gestapo Execution
8. Masters of Treachery
9. Wings of Destruction
10. Caught in the Caves of An-Kar-Ban
11. Hostages for Treason
12. The Black Hangman Strikes Again
13. The Toll of Treason

_{Source:}

== Cast ==
- Johnny Downs as Cadet Danny Collins
- Bobby Jordan as Cadet "Jinx" Roberts
- Ward Wood as Cadet "Scrapper" McKay
- Billy Benedict as Cadet "Zombie" Parker
- Jennifer Holt as Andre Mason
- Eduardo Ciannelli as Kurt von Heiger, alias Corby
- Regis Toomey as Captain Ralph Carson
- Robert Armstrong as Arthur Galt/The Black Hangman
- Charles Trowbridge as Maj. William Elliott
- Joseph Crehan as Colonel George Bolton
- Addison Richards as A.J. "Jack" Hill
- Leyland Hodgson as Captain Hartley, British Army
- Ian Keith as Colonel Lee
- Philip Van Zandt as Herman Klott/Jack Hargrove
- Joan Blair as Frau Klott/Mrs. Hargrove
- Selmer Jackson as Professor Mason

== Production ==
Adventures of the Flying Cadets was intended as part of Universal's Dead End Kids and Little Tough Guys series, a patriotic serial as the group's Junior G-Men of the Air had been. By the time the new serial went into production, lead actors Billy Halop and Bernard Punsly had joined the armed forces; only Bobby Jordan of the Little Tough Guys remained. Billy Benedict returned to the series, joined by juvenile lead Johnny Downs and young actor Ward Wood. The Dead End Kids and Little Tough Guys billing was dropped, officially ending the Universal series.

Adventures of the Flying Cadets was Universal's last aviation serial. The first had been The Airmail Mystery in 1932. Some of the airborne footage showing "Jinx Roberts" and his plane was originally filmed for the Abbott and Costello feature Keep 'Em Flying (1941).

Preceded by Don Winslow of the Coast Guard (1943)	Universal Serial; Adventures of the Flying Cadets(1943)	Succeeded by The Great Alaskan Mystery (1944)
