= List of slang terms for law enforcement and intelligence operatives =

The following is a list of slang terms used to refer to law enforcement and intelligence operatives, which are used by the public, members of organized crime, anti-establishment political groups or individuals, and occasionally other federal employees. This list does not encompass slang terms used to refer to local police departments, nor those that denote the agencies themselves.

== List ==
| Term | Notes |
|---|---|
| Alphabet, Alphabet agent, Alphabet boy | Commonly used by users of online far-right forums in reference to the many government agencies that use acronyms. |
| Clancy | In reference to American novelist Tom Clancy. Most often used by CIA agents to refer to new recruits who overestimate their knowledge of the field, specifically those who are overconfident as a result of having read a lot of Tom Clancy novels. |
| Cousin | Term used by American federal agents to refer to British government agents. |
| Babylon | Jamaican slang for members of establishments (including the police and federal agents) that are perceived as oppressive due to their association with white people. |
| Downtown gang | FBI |
| Fed | Abbreviation of "federal agent" or "federal police officer". |
| Federales, Federale | Informal Spanish word used to denote security forces operating for the federal government. Equivalent of "fed". |
| Glow in the dark, Glowie, Glows, Glowfag, Glownigger | The term was coined by Terry A. Davis, a computer programmer diagnosed with schizophrenia, who believed that the CIA was stalking and harassing him. "Glowie" is often used in online forums to refer to undercover government agents that stand out and are conspicuous, especially undercover operatives who infiltrate online extremist spaces for the purpose of entrapment. "Glow in the dark" and its derivative terms have been used to refer to various groups: newcomers that do not fit in with the culture of certain forums and are thus suspected to have bad intentions, journalists who report on extremist groups, tech companies that collect users' personal data, and others. |
| G-man, Government-man, G-woman | First used in 1928. According to popular legend, when American gangster Machine Gun Kelly was arrested, he shouted "Don't shoot, G-men! Don't shoot!". The term is primarily used to refer to FBI agents. |
| KGB | Acronym for the principal security agency of the Soviet Union from 1954 to 1991, now used as a slang term. |
| Little girl | In reference to FBI agents who pose as children online to catch child predators. |
| Men in black | A term often used by UFO conspiracy theorists, referring to alleged government agents who wear black suits and are responsible for the suppression of information related to UFOs, including testimonies of those who claim to have witnessed them. |
| Migra, la migra | Spanish term used to describe ICE, United States Border Patrol, or other similar agencies. |
| Militsiya | A term used in some post-Soviet countries to refer to a member of the secret police. |
| Mukhabarat, Al-Amn | Arabic terms for "intelligence" and "security", the former is mainly used for foreign intelligence whereas the latter is used for domestic intelligence. |
| Moscas | Border Patrol Police. |
| Narc, Nark, Narq | An informant or an undercover DEA agent. |
| Pepos | Mexican State Police |
| Sleeper | Derived from the term Sleeper agent, which refers an agent who spends a long time working to blend into a community they are surveilling. |
| Spook | Typically used to refer to an undercover agent. |
| The man | Can be used to refer to any figure of authority, but in some contexts federal agents specifically. It is associated with the Anti-authoritarian slogan "stick it to the man". Somewhat paradoxically, it can also be used as a compliment to indicate that someone is worthy of their position of power. |
| Three letter agent | Commonly used by users of online far-right forums, in reference to the numerous government agencies represented by three letter acronyms. |
| 12, Twelve | The DEA or police concerned with investigating drug-related crimes. Originating from police radio codes, it is now often used by drug dealers as a warning phrase. |
