= Little Tough Guys =

Group of actors who made a series of films and serials

The Little Tough Guys (later billed as Dead End Kids and Little Tough Guys) were a group of actors who made a series of films and serials released by Universal Studios from 1938 through 1943. Many of them were originally part of The Dead End Kids, and several of them later became members of The East Side Kids and The Bowery Boys.

== History ==
The urban drama Dead End became both a successful play and a hit movie, featuring six young actors playing streetwise guttersnipes: Billy Halop, Leo Gorcey, Huntz Hall, Gabriel Dell, Bobby Jordan, and Bernard Punsly. The troupe became known as The Dead End Kids and starred in a series of features for Warner Brothers.

== Little Tough Guys ==
In 1938, Universal borrowed the Dead End Kids (except Gorcey and Jordan) for a juvenile-delinquency drama called Little Tough Guy. Universal adopted this as a brand name, and turned the film into a series of Little Tough Guys features. The studio filled out the cast with David Gorcey (Leo's younger brother) and Hally Chester.

The next three films did not include any of the original Dead End Kids. Little Tough Guys in Society (1939) was more of a lightweight comedy, while the next two, Newsboys' Home and Code of the Streets (1939), were more dramatic. Jackie Cooper starred in Newsboys' Home, but was not a member of the team. Only David Gorcey and Hally Chester remained from the first film, Little Tough Guy. This was the beginning of the members of the team changing on almost a film-to-film basis. Eleven actors drifted in and out of the series, including Frankie Thomas, Charles Duncan (who was originally hired to play Leo Gorcey's role in the play Dead End), and Billy Benedict.

When Warners released Bobby Jordan from his contract, Universal quickly signed him to join the rest of gang. Now, with five of the original six Dead End Kids on the payroll, Universal revised the billing to read Dead End Kids and Little Tough Guys. In total, the Little Tough Guys made 12 feature films, and three 12-chapter serials.

Shemp Howard of the Three Stooges appeared in Give Us Wings, Hit the Road and Keep 'Em Slugging. Huntz Hall cited Howard as a major influence when his later "Bowery Boys" series shifted to all-out comedy.

== Series interruption ==
Billy Halop had always played his ringleader role very seriously, lending each streetwise film a downbeat tone. The series was interrupted when both Halop and Bernard Punsly joined the armed forces, leaving only three actors in the gang. Universal still had three projects scheduled for the Little Tough Guys, two feature films and a serial. The studio made Bobby Jordan the new leader and recruited Bud Abbott's nephew, Norman Abbott, to replace Punsly for the first feature, Keep 'Em Slugging (1943). Their new director was Christy Cabanne, a silent-era veteran usually called upon to wrap up a fading series quickly and cheaply. Cabanne encouraged his actors to play for laughs, which brightened the established tone. Keep 'Em Slugging ended the Little Tough Guys series on a high note, and the remaining two projects were retooled for other actors.

== Later incarnations ==
Adventures of the Flying Cadets (1943) was a patriotic serial like the Little Tough Guys' Junior G-Men of the Air had been. Only Bobby Jordan of the Little Tough Guys remained. Billy Benedict returned, joined by juvenile lead Johnny Downs and young actor Ward Wood. The Dead End Kids and Little Tough Guys billing was dropped, officially ending the Universal series.

The pending feature-film script, Fairy Tale Murder, featured a tough-kid gang but was rewritten as a vehicle for Universal's singing star Deanna Durbin, then abandoning frothy musicals for grittier dramatics. Durbin rejected the script and she was replaced by the studio's teenage singing star Gloria Jean, who was leaving the studio at the end of 1944; this film was rushed through production to fulfill her contractual commitment. Keefe Brasselle took the Billy Halop role, with radio actor Jack Grimes standing in for Huntz Hall. Completed in October 1944, the film was shelved for almost a full year before playing in theaters as River Gang in late 1945, after Gloria Jean had left Universal's employ. Outside the United States the film retained the Fairy Tale Murder title.

There was still a market for these tough-teen films, and most of the Little Tough Guys principals moved on to Monogram Pictures as The East Side Kids and The Bowery Boys.

== List of Dead End Kids and Little Tough Guys ==
- Billy Halop as Johnny/Jimmy/Tom/Tommy/Billy/Ace (1938-1943)
- Huntz Hall as Pig/Gyp/Toby/Bolts (1938-1943)
- Gabriel Dell as String/Terry/Bilge/Stick (1938, 1940-1943)
- Bernard Punsly as Ape/Lug/Butch/Greaseball (1938, 1940-1943)
- Bobby Jordan as Rap/Tommy (1940, 1943)
- David Gorcey as Sniper/Yap/Double Face Gordon (1938-1940, 1942)
- Hally Chester as Dopey/Murph/Trust/Swab (1938-1941)
- Frankie Thomas as Danny/Bob (1938-1939)
- Harris Berger as Sailor/Bud/Charlie (1938-1941)
- Elisha Cook, Jr. as Danny (1938)
- Charles Duncan as Monk (1938-1939)
- Billy Benedict as Trouble/Link/Whitey (1938-1940, 1942)
- James McCallion as Danny (1939)
- Kenneth Lundy as Buck (1940)
- Joe Recht as Lug (1941)
- David Durand as Bingo (1943)
- Norman Abbott as Ape (1943)

== Filmography ==
Year	Title	Team name	Notes
1938	Little Tough Guy	The 'Dead End' Kids	
1938	Little Tough Guys in Society	Little Tough Guys	
1939	Newsboys' Home	Little Tough Guys	
1939	Code of the Streets	Little Tough Guys	
1939	Call a Messenger	Dead End Kids and Little Tough Guys	
1940	You're Not So Tough	Dead End Kids and Little Tough Guys	
1940	Junior G-Men	Dead End Kids and Little Tough Guys	serial
1940	Give Us Wings	Dead End Kids and Little Tough Guys	
1941	Hit the Road	Dead End Kids and Little Tough Guys	
1941	Sea Raiders	Dead End Kids and Little Tough Guys	serial
1941	Mob Town	Dead End Kids and Little Tough Guys	
1942	Junior G-Men of the Air	Dead End Kids and Little Tough Guys	serial
1942	Tough as They Come	Dead End Kids and Little Tough Guys	
1942	Mug Town	Dead End Kids and Little Tough Guys	
1943	Keep 'Em Slugging	Dead End Kids and Little Tough Guys	

== See also ==
- Dead End Kids
- East Side Kids
- The Bowery Boys

Preceded by Dead End Kids; 1937–1939	Little Tough Guys; 1938–1943	Succeeded by East Side Kids; 1940–1945
