= Junior G-Men (serial) =

1940 film by Ford Beebe, John Rawlins

- Film poster
- Directed by: Ford Beebe; John Rawlins
- Screenplay by: George H. Plympton; Basil Dickey; Rex Taylor
- Produced by: Henry MacRae
- Starring: Billy Halop; Huntz Hall; Gabriel Dell; Bernard Punsly; Ken Lundy
- Cinematography: Jerome Ash
- Edited by: Saul A. Goodkind; Joseph Gluck; Louis Sackin; Alvin Todd
- Production company: Universal Pictures
- Distributed by: Universal Pictures
- Release date: October 1, 1940
- Running time: 240 minutes (12 chapters)
- Country: United States
- Language: English

Junior G-Men is a 1940 Universal film serial. It was Universal's 116th serial (and the 48th with sound) of their total of output of 137. The serial is one of the three serials starring "The Dead End Kids and Little Tough Guys" who were under contract to Universal at the time. The plot of Junior G-Men is a pre-World War II G-Man story about fifth columnists in the United States, with the FBI joining forces with youth to save the country. (Note: Hollywood in 1940 was a "youthful" industry; "The movie people – famous, pampered, rich – are very young to be so famous, so pampered and so rich.".)

== Plot ==
A group of saboteurs called the "Order of the Flaming Torch" who are trying to undermine the "social order" of the United States kidnaps several prominent scientists, including Colonel Robert Barton, the father of Billy Barton, the leader of a group of young local street toughs.

When FBI Agent Jim Bradford investigates the mysterious disappearances, Billy is reluctant to help the authorities. Billy's gang team up with the FBI and the youthful "Junior G-Men", led by Harry Trent in order to stop the saboteurs.

The criminal gang led by a man called Brand, calls themselves "The Order of the Flaming Torch". They are intent on destroying important military programs. The enemy agents become aware that they boys are on their trail and set a trap. When Billy and Harry are captured, they find a way to signal to their friends, and are rescued.

"The Order of the Flaming Torch" is after the inventor of a new aerial torpedo. Billy and Harry go to the local airfield and hide on one of the inventor's aircraft. When the pilot is knocked out by one of Brand's men, the boys struggle to regain control of the aircraft. Finally successful, Harry, a licensed pilot, takes over and flies to safety.

Learning that the enemy agents are holed up in an old warehouse where scientists including Colonel Barton is held, Billy and Harry try to free Barton, who has a secret formula for an explosive. Managing to send a message out from a radio room, the boys are saved when FBI agents overrun the warehouse. Billy is finally reunited with his father, and becomes a full-fledged member of the Junior G-Men.

=== Chapter titles ===
1. Enemies Within
2. The Blast of Doom
3. Human Dynamite
4. Blazing Danger
5. Trapped by Traitors
6. Traitors' Treachery
7. Flaming Death
8. Hurled Through Space
9. The Plunge of Peril
10. The Toll of Treason
11. Descending Doom
12. The Power of Patriotism

_{Source:}

== Cast ==
- Billy Halop as Billy Barton
- Huntz Hall as Gyp
- Gabriel Dell as Terry
- Bernard Punsly as Lug
- Ken Lundy as Buck
- Kenneth Howell as Harry Trent
- Roger Daniels as Midge
- Phillip Terry as Jim Bradford
- Russell Hicks as Colonel Robert Barton
- Cy Kendall as Brand
- Ben Taggart as Captain Severn
- Victor Zimmerman as Al Corey, a thug
- Edgar Edwards as Henchman Evans
- Gene Rizzi as Henchman Foster
- Florence Halop as Mary
- Harris Berger as sailor (uncredited)

== Production ==
To bring the Junior G-Men to life on the big screen, Universal Studios enlisted the Dead End Kids, a group of on-screen young street toughs that later became known as The Bowery Boys. The Little Tough Guys were combined with the earlier group. The Dead End Kids appear above the title in two serials that were made: Junior G-Men (1940) and Junior G-Men of the Air (1942).

=== Stunts ===
- David Sharpe doubled Billy Halop as Billy Barton.

== Reception ==
Reviewer Jerry Blake in his blog The Files of Jerry Blake described the film as both pro-typical and, at the same time, conventional as a "chapterplay", "Junior G-Men contains much more action than some of its Universal contemporaries; fistfights and chases figure prominently in most episodes, and give the serial a pleasantly fast-paced feel. Stuntmen Dave Sharpe (who doubles Billy Halop) and Ken Terrell inject plenty of energetic leaps and flips into the fistfights, while cinematographer Jerome Ash and directors Ford Beebe and John Rawlins film the chase sequences in fluid and exciting style."

== See also ==
- Junior G-Men of the Air
