= Junior G-Men of the Air =

1942 film by Ray Taylor, Lewis D. Collins

- Film poster
- Directed by: Lewis D. Collins; Ray Taylor
- Written by: Paul Huston; Griffin Jay; George H. Plympton; Brenda Weisberg
- Produced by: Henry MacRae
- Starring: Billy Halop; Gene Reynolds; Lionel Atwill; Frank Albertson
- Cinematography: William A. Sickner
- Edited by: Paul Landres; Louis Sackin; Alvin Todd; Edgar Zane
- Music by: Milton Rosen
- Production company: Universal Pictures
- Distributed by: Universal Pictures
- Release date: May 4, 1942
- Running time: 12 chapters (225 minutes)
- Country: United States
- Language: English

Junior G-Men of the Air is a 1942 Universal film serial starring the Dead End Kids and the Little Tough Guys. A group of youthful flying enthusiasts join the "Junior G-Men" to help break up a planned attack on the United States.

== Plot ==
During World War II, members of The Dead End Kids, a youth gang, Billy "Ace" Holden, "Bolts" Larson, "Stick" Munsey, Ace's brother, Eddie, and "Greaseball" Plunkett are working in a salvage yard owned by Ace's father, recovering aircraft parts. While making their escape from robbing a bank, members of a fifth column organization, the "Order of the Black Dragonfly", steal the boys' wrecking truck.

When agent Don Ames from the State Bureau of Investigation, returns their truck, the gang who is distrustful of authority, especially, the "cops", refuse to give a description of the men who stole the truck. Don asks Jerry Markham, leader of the Little Tough Guys, called the "Junior G-Men" to ask Ace for help. Both boys are passionate about aircraft and flying and agree to join forces.

Meanwhile, Axis agents working for "The Baron", a Japanese leader of the "Order of the Black Dragonfly", have more plans for the junkyard, especially the aircraft parts stored there. The Baron has orders to destroy anything that may help the Allied cause. Ace and Jerry join to go look for the enemy saboteurs and find their secret hideout in a farm outside the city.

The enemy agents capture Ace and Eddie, who escape in one of the aircraft that the Baron uses. Their takeoff ends in disaster as Ace hits a fence, tearing off the landing gear and punching a hole in the gasoline tank. The boys parachute to safety and make their way to government headquarters.

The Dead End Kids and Junior G-Men lead the government to the Baron's base and a furious battle takes place. Ace and Jerry personally capture the Baron and receive the government's thanks for bringing the enemy agents to justice.

=== Chapter titles ===
1. Wings Aflame
2. The Plunge of Peril
3. Hidden Danger
4. The Tunnel of Terror
5. The Black Dragon Strikes
6. Flaming Havoc
7. The Death Mist
8. Satan Fires the Fuse
9. Satanic Sabotage
10. Trapped in a Burning 'Chute
11. Undeclared War
12. Civilian Courage Conquers

== Cast ==
=== The Dead End Kids and the Little Tough Guys ===
- Billy Halop as Billy "Ace" Holden
- Huntz Hall as "Bolts" Larson
- Gabriel Dell as "Stick" Munsey
- Bernard Punsly as "Greaseball" Plunkett
- David Gorcey as Double Face Gordon
- Billy Benedict as Whitey

=== Additional cast ===
- Gene Reynolds as Eddie Holden
- Lionel Atwill as The Baron, a Japanese spy
- Frank Albertson as Jerry Markham
- Richard Lane as Agent Don Ames
- Frankie Darro as Jack
- Turhan Bey as Araka, The Baron's "Spear-point Heavy" (chief henchman)
- John Bleifer as Beal, one of The Baron's henchmen
- Eddie Foster as Comora, one of The Baron's henchmen
- John Bagni as Augar, one of The Baron's henchmen
- Noel Cravat as Monk, one of The Baron's henchmen
- Eddy Waller (uncredited) as Jed Holden

== Production ==
Junior G-Men of the Air was the third of Universal's three serials with the Dead End Kids and Little Tough Guys (preceded by Junior G-Men and Sea Raiders). The serial is the 55th of Universal's sound-era serials (following Gang Busters and ahead of Overland Mail) and is the last 12-chapter serial released by Universal.

The aircraft used in Junior G-Men of the Air are:

- Fokker Super Universal c/n 826, NC972
- Travel Air 2000 c/n 181, NC901
- Ryan STA c/n 139, NC17305
- Brown B-3 NX266Y

The locale for Junior G-Men of the Air was the Metropolitan Airport, Van Nuys, California. Aircraft owners at the airport supplied the Hollywood studios with aircraft for both ground and aerial scenes. (Note: Stock footage of the National Air Races from 1937, 1938 and 1939 was used.)

=== Stunts ===
- David Sharpe doubling Billy Halop
- Tom Steele doubling Turhan Bey
- Ken Terrell

== Reception ==
Hal Erickson on the Allmovie website reviewed Junior G-Men of the Air, condensing it to: "Over the course of twelve weeks, the kids are pitted against the worst kinds of villains and pluguglies, but by the final chapter our heroes have thwarted the Black Dragons' plans to sabotage the American defense program. Despite the serial's title, however, the "Junior G-Men" hardly spend any time at all in the air."

== See also ==
- Junior G-Men
- Junior G-Men (serial)
