= The Lady in the Morgue =

Book by Jonathan Latimer

- First edition
- Author: Jonathan Latimer
- Cover artist: Galdone
- Language: English
- Series: Bill Crane series
- Genre: Crime novel
- Publisher: Doubleday
- Publication date: 1936
- Publication place: United States
- Media type: Print (Hardback & Paperback)
- Pages: 246 pp (paperback edition)

The Lady in the Morgue (1936) is one of the novels by Jonathan Latimer featuring private detective William Crane. The lady of the title is a female corpse which is stolen from a Chicago morgue before the dead woman's identity can be established.

The book is to a large extent a send-up of the hardboiled school of crime writing. Crane is depicted as an ambivalent figure. Although he is tough and eventually solves the case through reasoning and cunning strategy, he is also a heavy drinker and ever so often prefers taking a nap to investigating the crime for which he has been hired. On the other hand, he is not afraid to deal with gangsters when he believes this might help him clear up the mystery.

Historians Robert A. Baker and Michael T. Nietzel describe The Lady in the Morgue as Latimer's "masterpiece" and "as funny and bizarre as a Marx Brothers comedy."

== Plot summary ==
Throughout the novel the true identity of the young, attractive woman found hanging dripping wet from a rope in her hotel room remains a mystery. Neither her clothes nor the conspicuous lack of any shoes provides the police with any clue as to what has happened, and they assume the woman has committed suicide. At the same time a young woman from a prominent New York family goes missing, but when the stolen body is retrieved by Crane her relatives assert that these are not her human remains. Only in the final pages is it found out that a case of switched identities is at the bottom of the riddle.

The Lady in the Morgue is remembered for its frank treatment of drug addiction among artists, for its frequent references to contemporary jazz and swing music, and for its bizarre setting (morgues, cemeteries).

== Publication history ==
The British publishing house Methuen & Co. Ltd. republished The Lady in the Morgue in hardcover in 1957.

== Film adaptation ==
The Lady in the Morgue was adapted for the big screen in 1938 (aka The Case of the Missing Blonde in the UK). The screenplay was written by Eric Taylor and Robertson White; the film, which starred Preston Foster as Bill Crane, was directed by Otis Garrett. It has often been cited as a particularly well-made B-movie.

== Read on ==
- Peter Cheyney's Can Ladies Kill? (1938) for another lady in a morgue
- Raymond Chandler's Farewell, My Lovely (1940) for another case of switched identities.
