= Ward Wood =

American actor

- Born: Robert Ward Wood; August 8, 1924; Grangeville, Idaho, U.S.
- Died: November 3, 2001 (aged 77); Santa Monica, California, U.S.
- Occupation: Actor
- Years active: 1943–1982

Ward Wood (August 8, 1924 – November 3, 2001) was an American actor and television writer. Wood was probably best known for his recurring role as police Lt. Art Malcolm in the TV series Mannix from 1968 to 1975.

== Life and career ==
Wood was born in Grangeville, Idaho (where his grandfather had been the county sheriff from 1891 until 1893). He was introduced to acting at an early age in Lewiston, Idaho by his mother and their family moved to California about 1935. He broke into movie acting in 1943, but very quickly took a hiatus to enlist as a Marine in World War II to avenge the death of his brother Charles, who was also an actor and also a Marine, after Charles was killed in action in the Pacific. After the war, Ward Wood returned to acting in 1947, and was active until the early 1980s. He was married to Peggy Jolene Mosley and Lynn Sherman. He had three children.

== Filmography ==
=== Film ===
Year	Title	Role	Notes
1943	Air Force	Radio Operator	
1943	We've Never Been Licked	Student	Uncredited
1943	Adventures of the Flying Cadets	Cadet Scrapper McKay	
1947	Ramrod	Link Thomas	
1948	Whispering Smith	Leroy Barton	
1948	The Far Frontier	Border Patrol Officer	Uncredited
1948	Wake of the Red Witch	Young Sailor	Uncredited
1949	Battleground	Replacement	Uncredited
1949	Samson and Delilah		Uncredited
1950	Kill the Umpire	Interne	Uncredited
1950	Union Station	Patrolman	Uncredited
1950	Redwood Forest Trail	Henchman Matt Mason	
1951	Go for Broke!	First Gunner	Uncredited
1951	Ten Tall Men	Armed Riff	Uncredited
1952	The Bushwackers	Second Henchman	
1952	Bugles in the Afternoon	Cowpoke	Uncredited
1952	Carbine Williams	Prisoner	Uncredited
1952	Fearless Fagan	Military Policeman at Gate	Uncredited
1952	Above and Beyond	Talkative Sergeant	Uncredited
1954	Riot in Cell Block 11	Bacon	Uncredited
1954	Return from the Sea	Clarke	
1955	Shotgun	Ed	
1956	The Proud and Profane	Sergeant Chester Peckinpaugh	Uncredited
1956	The Best Things in Life Are Free	Henchman	Uncredited
1957	Jeanne Eagels	Police Sergeant	Uncredited
1965	The Money Trap	Man in Bar	Uncredited
1972	The Loners	Sheriff	
1975	Posse from Heaven	Gabriel	Also writer and producer

=== Television ===
Year	Title	Role	Notes
1951	The Cisco Kid	Henchman Terry	2 episodes
1951–1952	Space Patrol	Harris / Phelps / Farlon	3 episodes
1954	General Electric Theater	Second Explorer	Episode: "High Green Wall"
1954	The Pepsi-Cola Playhouse	Barney	Episode: "Girl in Distress"
1954	Studio 57	Ted	Episode: "Fish Widow"
1956	My Friend Flicka	Buck Minifree	Episode: "The Medicine Man"
1956	Highway Patrol	Second Kidnapper	Episode: "Kidnap Copter"
1956	Broken Arrow	Chuck	Episode: "Passage Deferred"
1957	The Adventures of Rin Tin Tin	Otonah	Episode: "The Warrior's Promise"
1957	Official Detective	Reynolds	Episode: "The Deserted House"
1957	Tales of the Texas Rangers	Rackim	Episode: "The Kid from Amarillo"
1957	Telephone Time		Episode: "Sam Houston's Decision"
1957–1958	The Silent Service	Green / Quartermaster 3rd Class Russo / Lieutenant Ted Swain	3 episodes
1957–1968	Gunsmoke	Bates / Parker	2 episodes
1958	Alfred Hitchcock Presents	Police Sergeant McBaine	Season 3 Episode 29: "Fatal Figures"
1958	Steve Canyon	Brad Bradshaw	Episode: "Operation Zero Launch"
1958	Union Pacific	Wyler	Episode: "The Challenger"
1958–1959	Tales of Wells Fargo	Bob Caine / Nate, Outlaw	2 episodes
1958–1959	M Squad	Detective Gus Simmons / Police Sergeant Petrie	2 episodes
1959	Mackenzie's Raiders	Chief Red Wing	Episode: "Long Ride Home"
1959	Have Gun – Will Travel	Tom Bland / Hank Slade	2 episodes
1959	The Joseph Cotten Show	Second Explorer	Episode: "High Green Wall"
1959	Tightrope!	Collector	Episode: "The Casino"
1963	Ripcord	Commander Condon	Episode: "Semper Paratus Any Time"
1963	Arrest and Trial	Spike Keeler	Episode: "The Witnesses"
1964	The Great Adventure	Edwin Coppock	Episode: "The Night Raiders"
1964	The Twilight Zone	Man	Episode: "I Am the Night—Color Me Black"
1964–1965	Ben Casey	Dooley / Man / Dr. Taylor	3 episodes
1966	Preview Tonight	Chief Alex Jacobs	Episode: "Pursue and Destroy"
1966	Felony Squad	Father Mason	Episode: "A Walk to Oblivion"
1967	The Danny Thomas Hour	Captain Bolger	Episode: "The Enemy"
1968	Get Smart	Busby	Episode: "Closely Watched Planes"
1968–1975	Mannix	Lieutenant Art Malcolm	75 episodes
1972	Cannon	Grady	Episode: "Blood on the Vine"
1976	The Blue Knight	Officer Walker	Episode: "A Slower Beat"
1976	Charlie's Angels	Cooley	Episode: "Consenting Adults"
1977	The Streets of San Francisco	Gordon Dillworth	Episode: "Interlude"
1977	Kojak	Bob Lawrence	Episode: "Letters of Death"
1982	Dangerous Company	Doctor	Television film
