= G-man =

American slang term for federal agents

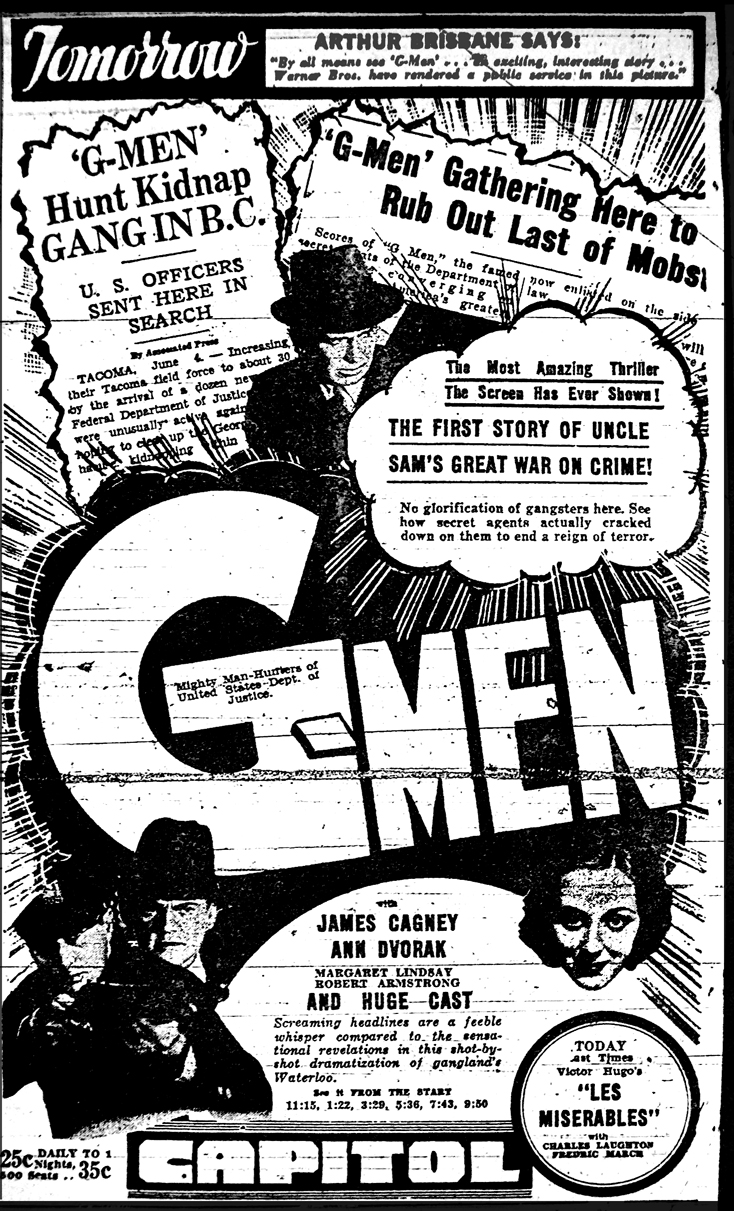
Poster for the 1935 film G Men

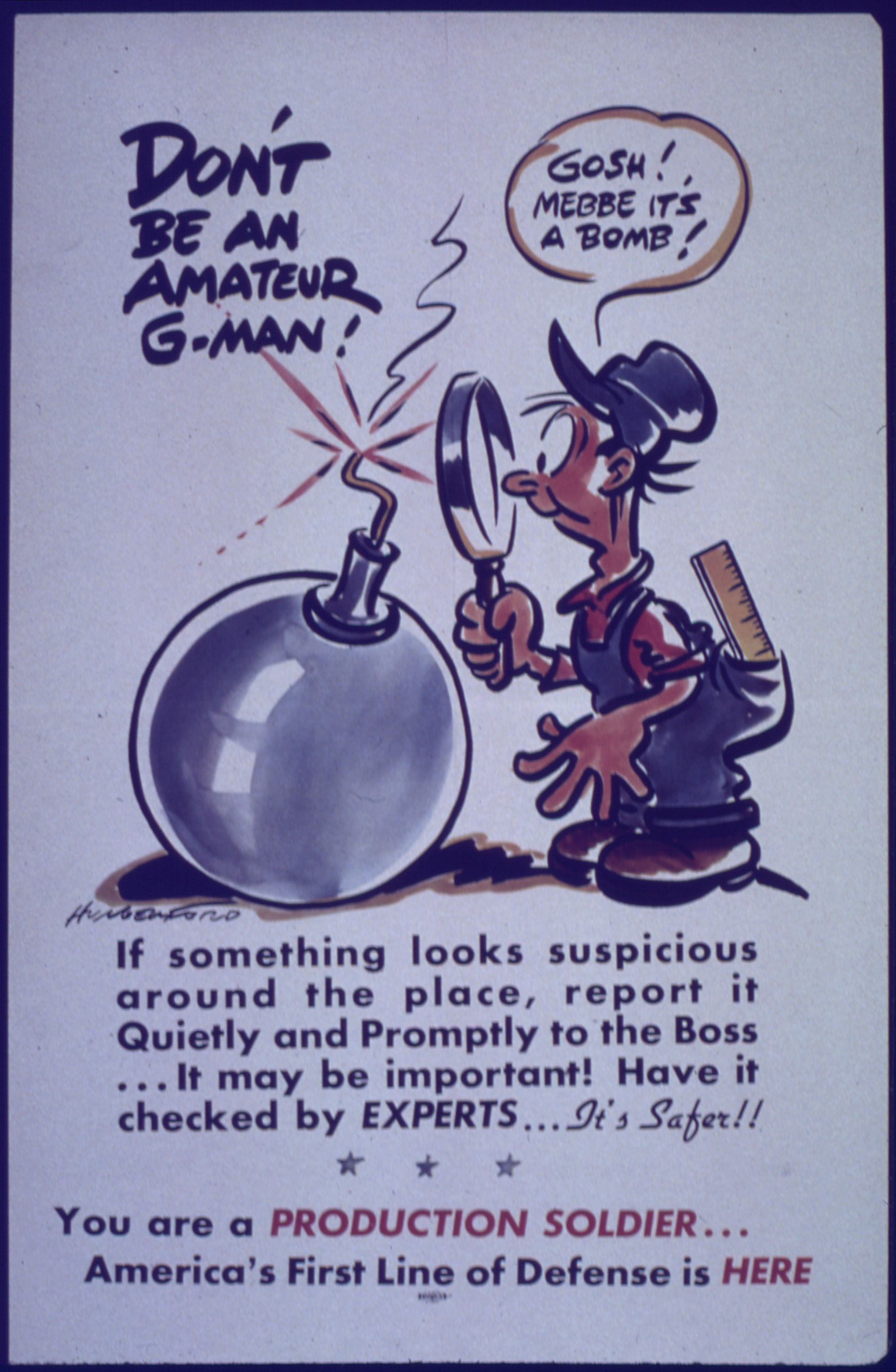
American World War II home front poster "Don't be an Amateur G-man!"

G-man (short for "government man", plural G-men) is an American slang term for agents of the United States Government. It is especially used as a term for an agent of the Federal Bureau of Investigation (FBI).

According to the Merriam-Webster Dictionary, the term "G-man" was first used in the year 1928. The earliest citation in the Oxford English Dictionary for the American usage of the term "G-man" was in 1930, from a biography of Al Capone by F. D. Pasley. In popular legend, the term originated during the September 1933 arrest of the gangster George "Machine Gun" Kelly by agents of the Bureau of Investigation (BOI), a forerunner of the FBI. Finding himself unarmed, Kelly supposedly shouted, "Don't shoot, G-men! Don't shoot!", although this is probably a fabrication.

G-man is also a term used for members of G Division, a Dublin Metropolitan Police unit operating out of Dublin Castle prior to Irish independence in 1922. Colonel Ned Broy uses the term in his official testimony for the Irish Army's Bureau of Military History in their archive of the Easter Rising (1916) and the Irish War of Independence (1919–1921).

== Use in media ==
- The term was the basis of the title for the 1935 film G Men, starring James Cagney, which was one of the top-grossing films of that year.
- Kelly's surrender is dramatized in the 1959 film The FBI Story. The encounter with Kelly is similarly dramatized in the 1973 film Dillinger. The film was followed by a 1974 television film titled Melvin Purvis: G-Man.
- The Spanish Rock band Hombres G got its name in 1983 from the Spanish translation of "G-man" and after the James Cagney film G Men.
- In the Half-Life video game series (1998–), one of the main characters is a "sinister interdimensional bureaucrat" nicknamed the G-Man. Dressed in a suit and tie, and often carrying a briefcase, he speaks in a cryptic manner, and periodically intervenes to store or utilise the player character, Gordon Freeman, to shape events.
- Garfield High School in Ohio and Graham High School in Virginia both use the G-Men as the mascot for their boys' athletic teams. Garfield utilizes private detective-related imagery, while Graham uses a police badge similar to those used in the United States by county sheriffs.

== See also ==
- Agent (The Matrix)
- G.I.
- Federal Bureau of Investigation portrayal in media
- Men in black
- List of slang terms for federal agents
