= G Men =

1935 film by William Keighley

- Theatrical release poster
- Directed by: William Keighley
- Written by: Darryl F. Zanuck (story, uncredited); Seton I. Miller; Beulah Ashley (script, uncredited)
- Based on: Public Enemy No. 1 by Gregory Rogers
- Produced by: Louis F. Edelman; Hal B. Wallis
- Starring: James Cagney; Ann Dvorak; Margaret Lindsay; Robert Armstrong
- Cinematography: Sol Polito
- Edited by: Jack Killifer
- Music by: Bernhard Kaun
- Distributed by: Warner Bros. Pictures
- Release date: April 18, 1935
- Running time: 85 minutes
- Country: United States
- Language: English
- Budget: $307,000
- Box office: $1,963,000

G Men is a 1935 Warner Bros. crime film starring James Cagney, Ann Dvorak, Margaret Lindsay and Lloyd Nolan in his film debut. According to Variety, the movie was one of the top-grossing films of 1935. The supporting cast features Robert Armstrong and Barton MacLane.

G Men was made as part of a deliberate attempt by the Warners to counteract what many political and business leaders claimed was a disturbing trend of glorifying criminals in the early 1930s gangster film genre. Although the gangster films were typically presented as moral indictments of organized crime where the criminal protagonist inevitably died, they nevertheless depicted a life of freedom, power and luxury enjoyed by gangsters in the midst of a real-life economic crisis. Foremost of these films were Little Caesar, the original Scarface, and perhaps the most memorable, The Public Enemy, in which Cagney portrayed street tough Tom Powers, the role that catapulted him to stardom. What was deemed most objectionable about these films was that law enforcement was typically portrayed as either impotent in the face of crime, or, as with Public Enemy, akin to a derelict and largely absentee father shirking his duty. Based on this interpretation, G Men supplanted the criminal protagonist with the heroic federal police officer.

Most prints of this film include a brief prologue added at the beginning for the 1949 re-release (on the FBI's 25th anniversary). This scene depicts a senior agent (played by David Brian) introducing a screening of the film to a group of FBI recruits so that they may learn about the Bureau's history.

== Plot ==
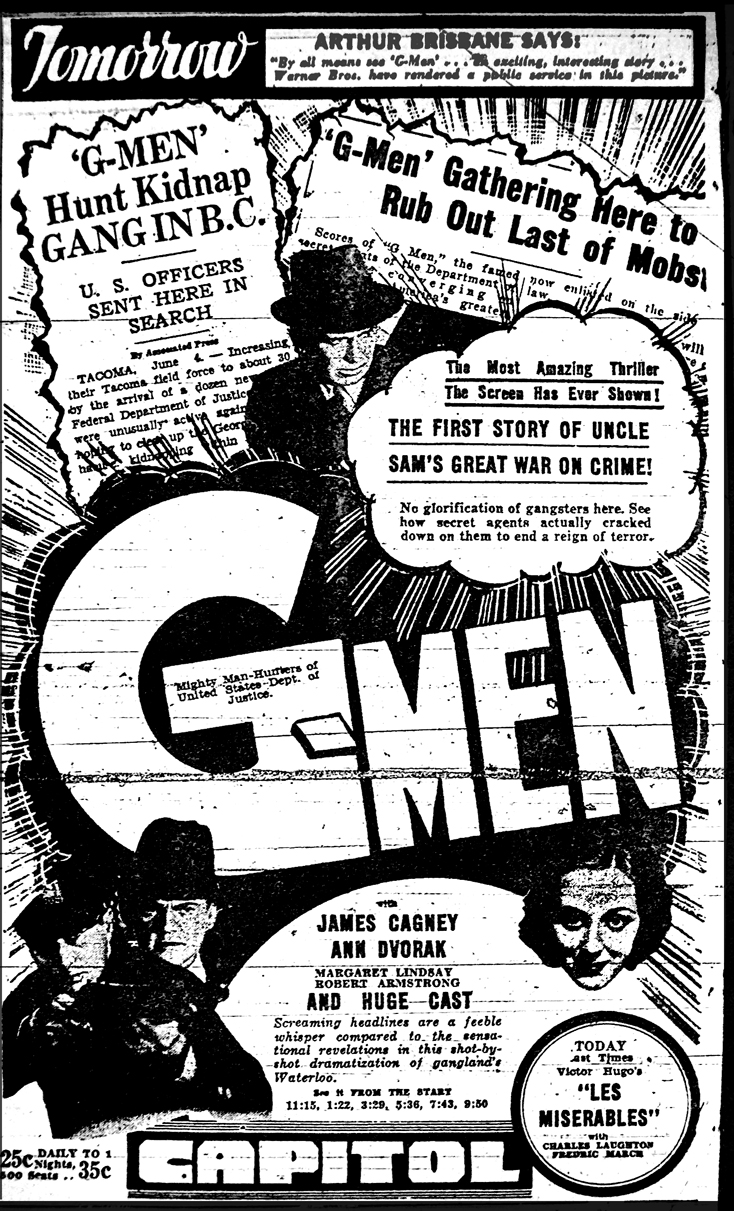
Newspaper ad for G Men making a connection between the film and real-life G Men in the FBI, who were tracking kidnappers in the Pacific Northwest

One year after graduation, New York City lawyer James "Brick" Davis has no clients because he refuses to compromise with his ideals and integrity. His friend Eddie Buchanan tries to recruit him as a federal agent or "G Man" (government man), but Davis is unsure. However, when Buchanan is killed while trying to arrest a gangster, Davis changes his mind, determined to bring the killer to justice. He bids farewell to his mentor, "Mac" MacKay, a mob boss who financed his education to keep Davis on the right side of the law. He bids farewell to Jean Morgan, the star of MacKay's nightclub who has feelings for Davis.

Davis travels to Washington, D.C. to begin his training. A mutual dislike forms immediately between him and his instructor, Jeff McCord, which eventually subsides as time passes, but not before McCord openly mocks and derides Davis' attempts at training . However, Davis is attracted to McCord's sister Kay, which strengthens his determination to remain passive despite McCord's efforts to rile him.

Meanwhile, MacKay retires and buys a resort lodge out in the woods of Wisconsin. His men, free of his restraint, embark on a crime spree. Hamstrung by existing laws (federal agents have to get local warrants and are not even allowed to carry guns), the head of the G-Men pleads for new laws to empower his beleaguered men. They are enacted with great speed.

Davis identifies one of the perpetrators, Danny Leggett, by his superstition of always wearing a gardenia. Not having completed his training, he can only give agent Hugh Farrell tips on Leggett's habits. His quarry is tracked and captured by Farrell, but he and some of his men are gunned down, and Leggett flees.

McCord is put in charge of the manhunt and given his choice of five agents. He picks Davis, a decision that later pays dividends when Jean is brought in for questioning, Davis learns she is now married to Collins, one of the crooks. She inadvertently lets slip that the gang is hiding out at MacKay's lodge (against MacKay's will). In the ensuing wild shootout, Davis kills MacKay, who was being used as a human shield. Before he dies, MacKay forgives his distraught friend. Davis then tries to resign from the department but McCord talks him out of it by reminding him that McKay's death wasn't his fault and asks him to stay on.

Only Collins gets away. McCord and Davis go to Jean's apartment to warn her. Jean is not there, but Collins is, and shoots at them. Davis pushes McCord out of the way and takes a bullet meant for him. Collins gets away. Davis ends up in the hospital (where Kay is a nurse) for his shoulder wound. Collins kidnaps Kay to use as a hostage. Jean finds out where he is hiding and telephones Davis, only to be shot by her husband. Davis bolts from his hospital bed, has some final words for the dying Jean, sneaks inside the garage and rescues Kay. Collins is shot to death by McCord as he tries to drive away. Kay escorts the still-bandaged Davis back to the hospital, vowing to "handle your case personally."

== Cast ==
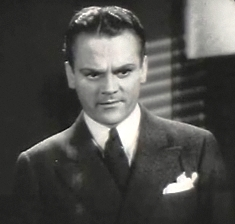
James Cagney in G Men

- James Cagney as James "Brick" Davis
- Margaret Lindsay as Miss Kay McCord
- Ann Dvorak as Jean Morgan Collins
- Robert Armstrong as Jeffrey "Jeff" McCord
- Barton MacLane as Brad Collins
- Lloyd Nolan as Hugh Farrell
- William Harrigan as "Mac" MacKay
- Russell Hopton as Gerard
- Edward Pawley as Danny Leggett
- Addison Richards as Gregory (essentially the film's Hoover)
- Noel Madison as Durfee
- Harold Huber as Venke (hoodlum in garage)
- Monte Blue as Fingerprint Expert
- Regis Toomey as Edward "Eddie" Buchanan
- Raymond Hatton as Gangster Who Delivers Warning To McCord
- Edwin Maxwell as Joseph Kratz
- Ward Bond as Gunman at Train Station
- Adrian Morris as Accomplice

== Reception ==
In 2008, the American Film Institute nominated this film for its Top 10 Gangster Films list.

=== Box office ===
According to records at Warner Bros., the film earned $1,143,000 in the U.S. and $820,000 internationally.
