= Michael Mann filmography =

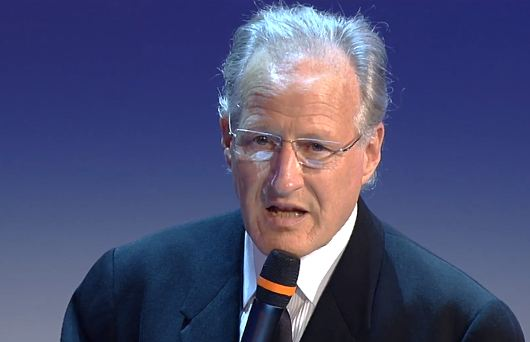
Michael Mann in 2012

Michael Mann is an American filmmaker known for directing, producing, and writing various works of film and television.

== Filmography ==
=== Feature films ===
Year	Title	Director	Writer	Producer
1978	Straight Time	No	Uncredited	No
1981	Thief	Yes	Yes	Executive
1983	The Keep	Yes	Yes	No
1986	Manhunter	Yes	Yes	No
1992	The Last of the Mohicans	Yes	Yes	Yes
1995	Heat	Yes	Yes	Yes
1999	The Insider	Yes	Yes	Yes
2001	Ali	Yes	Yes	Yes
2004	Collateral	Yes	No	Yes
2006	Miami Vice	Yes	Yes	Yes
2009	Public Enemies	Yes	Yes	Yes
2015	Blackhat	Yes	No	Yes
2023	Ferrari	Yes	No	Yes

Producer only

Year	Title	Notes
1986	Band of the Hand	Executive producer
2003	Baadasssss!	Executive producer
2004	The Aviator	
2007	The Kingdom	
2008	Hancock	
2011	Texas Killing Fields	
2019	Ford v Ferrari	Executive producer

=== Short films ===
Year	Title
1968	Insurrection
1971	Jaunpuri
1972	17 Days Down the Line

== Television ==
=== TV series ===
Year	Title	Director	Writer	Executive producer	Notes
1975–1977	Starsky & Hutch	No	Yes	No	4 episodes
1976	Bronk	No	Yes	No	2 episodes
1976	Gibbsville	No	Yes	No	Episode: "All the Young Girls"
1976–1978	Police Story	No	Yes	No	4 episodes
1977	Police Woman	Yes	No	No	Episode: "The Buttercup Killer"
1978–1981	Vegas	No	Yes	No	Creator
1984–1990	Miami Vice	No	Yes	Yes	Wrote episode "Golden Triangle"
1986–1988	Crime Story	Yes	Story	Yes	Wrote story for 8 episodes; Directed "Top of the World"
1990	Drug Wars: The Camarena Story	No	Story	Yes	Miniseries; Wrote story for "Part 3"
2002–2003	Robbery Homicide Division	No	Yes	Yes	Wrote episode "Life is Dust"
2011–2012	Luck	Yes	No	Yes	Directed "Pilot"
2012	Witness	No	No	Yes	Documentary series
2022–2024	Tokyo Vice	Yes	No	Yes	Directed "The Test"
2022	Legacy: The True Story of the LA Lakers	No	No	Yes	Documentary series

=== TV movies ===
Year	Title	Director	Writer	Executive producer
1979	The Jericho Mile	Yes	Yes	No
1980	Swan Song	No	Yes	No
1989	L.A. Takedown	Yes	Yes	Yes
1992	Drug Wars: The Cocaine Cartel	No	Yes	Yes

== Unrealized projects ==
Year	Title and description	Ref.
1970s	Karpis, retitled from The Last Public Enemy, a film adaptation of Alvin Karpis' novel The Alvin Karpis Story to be directed by John Frankenheimer	
1970s	A film adaptation of Pete Hamill's novel Dirty Laundry	
1980s	Untitled film set in the Golden Triangle	
1980s	Breathless	
1980s	The Godfather Part III	
1990s	A film adaptation of Richard Preston's 1992 New Yorker article "Crisis in the Hot Zone"	
1990s	Untitled biopic about Hollywood private detective Anthony Pellicano	
1990s	James Dean starring Leonardo DiCaprio	
1990s	A film adaptation of Sebastian Faulks' novel Birdsong	
1990s	Untitled biopic about Armenian arms merchant Sarkis Soghanalian	
1990s	Good Will Hunting	
1990s	The Inside Man, a legal drama starring Leonardo DiCaprio	
1990s	The Zen Differential, a film adaptation of William Gibson's novel Count Zero	
1990s	Untitled film epic written by Shane Salerno about drug trade in Southern California	
1990s	The Aviator	
1990s	A film remake of the BBC miniseries House of Cards written by David Franzoni starring Al Pacino	
1990s	A film adaptation of Steven Pressfield's novel Gates of Fire written by David Self starring George Clooney	
2000s	Rubicon, a biopic of Julius Caesar written by John Orloff starring Tom Hanks	
2000s	Shooter starring Brad Pitt as Bob Lee Swagger	
2000s	Hatfields and McCoys, a drama about the Hatfield–McCoy feud written by Eric Roth starring Brad Pitt	
2000s	The Few, a biopic about World War II fighter pilot Billy Fiske written by John Logan starring Tom Cruise and Val Kilmer	
2000s	Arms and the Man, a film about Russian arms dealer Viktor Bout based on an article by Peter Landesman	
2000s	Fortune's Fools, a crime drama about five officers who steal a winning lottery ticket from a drug dealer	
2000s	A film adaptation of James L. Swanson's novel Manhunt starring Harrison Ford	
2000s	Hancock, retitled from Tonight, He Comes	
2000s	A film adaptation of Ernest Hemingway's novel For Whom the Bell Tolls starring Leonardo DiCaprio	
2000s	Damage Control, a sports drama about a spin doctor who represents troubled players starring Jamie Foxx	
2000s	Comanche, a Western co-written with Eric Roth inspired by the Comanche capture of Cynthia Ann Parker	
2000s	A film adaptation of Alexander Goldfarb and Marina Litvinenko's novel Death of a Dissident	
2000s	Untitled 1930s L.A.-set noir drama written by John Logan starring Leonardo DiCaprio	
2000s	Empire, a drama written by John Logan about a modern global media mogul starring Will Smith	
2000s	Frankie Machine, a film adaptation of Don Winslow's novel written by Alex Tse starring Robert De Niro	
2000s	Untitled film epic written by Paul Webb set in post-Communist Russia	
2000s	A film adaptation of Susana Fortes' novel Waiting for Robert Capa written by Jez Butterworth starring Andrew Garfield and Gemma Arterton	
2010s	A film adaptation of Bernard Cornwell's novel Agincourt written by Benjamin Ross and Stuart Hazeldine	
2010s	Big Tuna, a mafia film based in Chicago about the story of Tony Accardo and his successor Sam Giancana written by Sheldon Turner	
2010s	Gold starring Christian Bale as Kenny Wells	
2010s	Batam, a film set in the South China Sea written by Alex Sage	
2010s	A film adaptation A.J. Baime's novel Go Like Hell starring Brad Pitt	
2010s	The Big Stone Grid, a cop thriller written by S. Craig Zahler about two decorated detectives who uncover an extortion ring	
2010s	Untitled sci-fi film	
2010s	A film adaptation of Mark Bowden's novel Hue 1968	
2010s	A film adaptation of Elaine Shannon's novel Hunting LeRoux	
2020s	Heat 3 and Heat 4, the second and third installments in a planned Heat book trilogy	
2020s	A remake of the 2015 Korean film Veteran	
2020s	Untitled global manhunt crime novel co-authored with Meg Gardiner	
2020s	Untitled Western film	
