= Swan song (disambiguation) =

Swan song is a reference to an ancient, controversial belief that swans sing just before they die, and also an idiom for a final performance or accomplishment.

Swan Song(s), The Swan Song or Swansong may also refer to:

== Film and television ==
=== Films ===
- Swan Song (1945 film), an Argentine film
- Swan Song (1967 film), a Shaw Brothers film
- Swan Song (1980 film), a television film directed by Jerry London and written by Michael Mann
- Swan Song (1992 film), a film adaptation of Chekhov's play (see below)
- Swansong – the Story of Occi Burne, a 2009 film awarded a prize at 8th Irish Film & Television Awards
- Swan Song (2021 Benjamin Cleary film), an American drama film starring Mahershala Ali
- Swan Song (2021 Todd Stephens film), an American drama film starring Udo Kier
- Swan Song (2023 film), a Canadian documentary film by Chelsea McMullan

=== Television episodes ===
- "Swan Song" (Castle)
- "Swan Song" (Columbo)
- "Swan Song" (Dawson's Creek)
- "Swansong" (Doctors)
- "Swan Song" (Gilmore Girls)
- "Swan Song" (Glee)
- "Swan Song" (NCIS)
- "Swan Song" (Once Upon a Time)
- "Swan Song" (Supernatural)
- "Swan Song", a retrospective episode of House that preceded the series' final episode, "Everybody Dies"
- "Heeramandi: The Swan Song", an episode of the 2024 Indian TV series Heeramandi

== Literature ==
- Swansong (play), a one-act play by Anton Chekhov
- Swan Song (McCammon novel), a horror novel by Robert R. McCammon
- Swan Song (Stableford novel), a novel in the Hooded Swan series by Brian Stableford
- Swan Song, a 1928 novel by John Galsworthy in The Forsyte Saga
- Swan Song (Crispin novel), a 1947 detective novel by Edmund Crispin
- "Swan Song", a short story by Agatha Christie collected in The Listerdale Mystery
- Swan Song, a novella by Liviu Rebreanu
- Swansong (Andrew novel), a 2019 novel by Kerry Andrew
- "Swansong", a short story by Shena Mackay in her 2008 collection The Atmospheric Railway
- Swan Song (memoir), an upcoming 2026 memoir by Charles Spencer, 9th Earl Spencer

== Music ==
- Swan Song Records, a record label founded by Led Zeppelin
- Swan Song (Schubert) (Schwanengesang), a collection of songs by Franz Schubert
- Schwanengesang (Swan song), a poem by Johann Senn set to music by Franz Schubert

=== Albums ===
- Swan Song (album), a 2021 album by The Plot in You
- Swansong (album), a 1996 album by Carcass
- Swansongs (Chocolate Genius Album) (2010)
- Swan Songs (Epik High album) (2005)
- Swan Songs (Hollywood Undead album) (2008)
- Swansongs, a 1996 album by Flowing Tears

=== Songs ===
- "Swan Song" (song), a 2019 song by Dua Lipa from the film Alita: Battle Angel
- "Swan Song", a song by the Bee Gees from Idea
- "SwanSong", a song by the Boo Radleys from Learning to Walk
- "Swan Song", a song by Betraying the Martyrs from Silver Lining
- "Swan Song", a song by Brand X from Is There Anything About?
- "Swan Song", a song by Bury Your Dead from It's Nothing Personal
- "Swan Song", a song by Down from NOLA
- "SwanSong", a song by Dubstar from Make It Better
- "Swan Song", a song by Grimes from Halfaxa
- "SwanSong", a song by Kristy Hanson from Already Gone (album)
- "Swan Song", a song by His Name Is Alive from Ft. Lake
- "Swansong", a song by Howards Alias from ep.i.phan.ic
- "Swan Song", a song by KinKi Kids from J Album
- "Swan Song", an unreleased song by Led Zeppelin, recorded by The Firm as "Midnight Moonlight" for The Firm
- "Swan Song", a song by Lovebites from Electric Pentagram
- "SwanSong", a song by Nurse with Wound from Alas the Madonna Does Not Function
- "SwanSong", a song by Rae & Christian from Northern Sulphuric Soul
- "Swan Song", a song by Lana Del Rey from Honeymoon
- Swansong, a 1989 composition for radio by David Sawer
- "Swan Song", a song by Set It Off
- "SwanSong", a song by 7 Seconds from Soulforce Revolution
- "Swan Song", a song by Unwritten Law from Swan
- "Swan Song", a song by Jessie Ware from Devotion
- "The Swan Song", a song by Within Temptation from The Silent Force
- "Swan Song", a song by Luniz from Silver & Black
- "Swan Song", a song by Saweetie and Niki from Shang-Chi and the Legend of the Ten Rings: The Album
- "Swan Song", a song by King Gizzard & the Lizard Wizard from The Silver Cord
- "Swan Song", a song by Le Sserafim from Easy

== Video games ==
- Swan Song, a visual novel game by Flying Shine
- Vampire: The Masquerade – Swansong, a role-playing video game by Big Bad Wolf

== See also ==
- "Sing Swan Song", from Ege Bamyası by Can
- Labudova pesma (Swan song), an album by Riblja Čorba
