= Heat (1995 film) =

1995 crime drama film by Michael Mann

- Theatrical release poster
- Directed by: Michael Mann
- Written by: Michael Mann
- Based on: L.A. Takedown by Michael Mann
- Produced by: Michael Mann; Art Linson
- Starring: Al Pacino; Robert De Niro; Tom Sizemore; Diane Venora; Amy Brenneman; Ashley Judd; Mykelti Williamson; Wes Studi; Ted Levine; Jon Voight; Val Kilmer
- Cinematography: Dante Spinotti
- Edited by: Dov Hoenig; Pasquale Buba; William Goldenberg; Tom Rolf
- Music by: Elliot Goldenthal
- Production companies: Regency Enterprises; Forward Pass
- Distributed by: Warner Bros.
- Release date: December 15, 1995
- Running time: 170 minutes
- Country: United States
- Language: English
- Budget: $60 million
- Box office: $187.4 million

Heat is a 1995 American epic crime drama film written and directed by Michael Mann and starring Al Pacino, Robert De Niro, Tom Sizemore, Diane Venora, Amy Brenneman, Ashley Judd, Mykelti Williamson, Wes Studi, Ted Levine, Jon Voight, and Val Kilmer. In the film, LAPD detective Vincent Hanna (Pacino) attempts to apprehend career thief Neil McCauley (De Niro), leading to strain on their professional lives and personal relationships.

Mann wrote the original script for Heat in 1979, basing it on Chicago police officer Chuck Adamson's pursuit of criminal Neil McCauley, after whom De Niro's character is named. The script was first used for a television pilot developed by Mann, which became the 1989 television film L.A. Takedown after the pilot did not receive a series order. In 1994, Mann revisited the script to turn it into a feature film, co-producing the project with Art Linson. The film marks De Niro and Pacino's first on-screen appearance together after co-starring but not sharing a scene in The Godfather Part II (1974): the film's promotion centered heavily on the actors' involvement.

Heat was theatrically released in the United States by Warner Bros. on December 15, 1995. It grossed $187.4 million worldwide and received critical acclaim, with praise for Mann's direction as well as the performances from both Pacino and De Niro. Heat is considered to be one of the best and most influential crime films of all time, inspiring several other works. A sequel novel, Heat 2, was written by Mann and Meg Gardiner and released in 2022, with a film adaptation to be written and directed by Mann and starring Leonardo DiCaprio and Christian Bale.

== Plot ==
Neil McCauley, a Los Angeles-based professional thief, and his crew—Chris Shiherlis, Michael Cheritto, Gilbert Trejo, and new recruit Waingro—rob $1.6 million in bearer bonds from an armored car. Waingro, who unbeknownst to McCauley is an active serial killer who targets underaged prostitutes, kills a guard without provocation, forcing the crew to kill two other guards. McCauley decides to kill him in response, but Waingro escapes while he's distracted.

LAPD Robbery Homicide Detective Lieutenant Vincent Hanna and his team investigate the robbery. Hanna, a dedicated lawman and former Marine, has a strained relationship with his third wife, Justine, and struggles to connect with his stepdaughter, Lauren. McCauley, who lives a solitary life, starts a relationship with Eady, a graphic designer new to Los Angeles, and contemplates leaving with her to start over.

McCauley's fence Nate suggests selling the stolen bonds to their original owner, money launderer Roger Van Zant. Van Zant pretends to agree but instead arranges an ambush. Anticipating a trap, McCauley and his crew counter-ambush and kill the hitmen. Afterward, McCauley threatens to kill Van Zant. An informant connects Cheritto to the robbery, and Hanna's team begins monitoring him, identifying the rest of the crew and their next target, a precious metals depository. The team stakes out the depository and subsequently breaks in, but when a careless officer makes a noise, McCauley aborts the heist. Unable to prove McCauley's crew stole anything, Hanna reluctantly lets them escape.

The next day, McCauley's crew plans one final bank robbery worth $12.2 million. Hanna stops McCauley on the 105 Freeway and invites him to coffee. They discuss their dedication to their jobs and personal limitations. Hanna talks about his failing marriage, and McCauley admits he is also isolated. Both men express mutual respect but declare they will kill the other if necessary. Waingro cuts a deal with Van Zant to get revenge on McCauley. Trejo backs out of the heist after failing to shake his police surveillance, and McCauley hires ex-con Don Breedan to replace him before executing the heist.

Tipped by Van Zant's associate Hugh Benny, the LAPD intercepts the crew after leaving the bank, sparking a shootout. Breedan, Cheritto, and many police are killed, while Shiherlis is wounded. McCauley and Shiherlis escape, and McCauley takes Shiherlis to a doctor before leaving him with Nate. Suspecting Trejo tipped off the police, McCauley goes to his house to find him paralyzed from a beating and his wife dead. Before asking McCauley to kill him, Trejo reveals Waingro and Van Zant are responsible for his betrayal.

McCauley guns down Van Zant at his home, while Hanna's team detains Benny. Discovering McCauley's connection to Waingro, who is hiding in a hotel, Hanna uses Waingro as bait to lure McCauley. As McCauley plans to retreat, Eady discovers his criminal identity but agrees to go with him. Shiherlis plans to reconcile with his estranged wife Charlene, who is being forced by the LAPD to bring him in. Charlene chooses to warn him instead, and a heartbroken Shiherlis slips away.

Having separated from Justine, Hanna finds Lauren in his hotel room, unconscious after attempting suicide. He rushes her to the hospital and saves her life. Hanna reconciles with Justine, although the two agree that their marriage will never work.

McCauley drives with Eady to the Los Angeles International Airport to fly to New Zealand via private jet. However, when Nate gives him Waingro's location, McCauley chooses to break into the hotel and kill him personally, tipping off his location to the police. Spotted by Hanna, McCauley abandons Eady. Hanna chases McCauley onto the tarmac at the airport, and the two stalk each other before Hanna outmaneuvers and fatally shoots McCauley. Hanna takes McCauley's hand as he dies of his wounds.

== Cast ==
- Al Pacino as LAPD Robbery Homicide Lieutenant Vincent Hanna
- Robert De Niro as Neil McCauley
- Val Kilmer as Chris Shiherlis
- Jon Voight as Nate
- Tom Sizemore as Michael Cheritto
- Diane Venora as Justine Hanna
- Amy Brenneman as Eady
- Ashley Judd as Charlene Shiherlis
- Mykelti Williamson as Sergeant Bobby Drucker
- Wes Studi as Detective Sammy Casals
- Ted Levine as Detective Mike Bosko
- Dennis Haysbert as Don Breedan
- William Fichtner as Roger Van Zant
- Natalie Portman as Lauren Gustafson
- Tom Noonan as Kelso
- Niki Haris as Marcia Drucker
- Kevin Gage as Waingro
- Hank Azaria as Alan Marciano
- Danny Trejo as Gilbert Trejo
- Susan Traylor as Elaine Cheritto
- Kim Staunton as Lillian
- Henry Rollins as Hugh Benny
- Jerry Trimble as Detective Danny Schwartz
- Tone Loc as Richard Torena
- Ricky Harris as Albert Torena
- Ray Buktenica as Timmons
- Jeremy Piven as Dr. Bob
- Xander Berkeley as Ralph

Additional cast members include Martin Ferrero as a hardware salesman, Farrah Forke as news reporter Claudia, Patricia Healy as a woman in a relationship with Bosko, Rainelle Saunders as a prostitute murdered by Waingro, Hazelle Goodman as the prostitute's mother, and Yvonne Zima as the girl taken hostage by Cheritto. Featured as members of the LAPD are Steven Ford as Officer Bruce, Paul Herman as Sergeant Heinz, Cindy Katz as forensics investigator Rachel, Brian Libby as Captain Jackson, and Dan Martin as Detective Harry Dieter. Stuntmen Rick Avery, Bill McIntosh, and Thomas Rosales Jr. portray the armored truck guards. Bud Cort makes an uncredited appearance as restaurant owner Solenko.

== Development ==
Michael Mann, for Heat (just like for Collateral and Thief), created the character of Neil McCauley, played by Robert De Niro, drawing inspiration from the minimalist and detached style of Alain Delon in Le Samouraï. The line "I am alone, not lonely" from McCauley (De Niro in Heat) directly echoes the one from Jeff Costello (Delon in Le Samouraï): "I never lose, never really".

=== Factual basis ===
Heat is based on the true story of Neil McCauley, a calculating criminal and ex-Alcatraz inmate who was tracked down by Detective Chuck Adamson in 1964. In 1961, McCauley was transferred from Alcatraz to McNeil Island Corrections Center, as mentioned in the film. He was released in 1962 and immediately began planning new crimes. Michael Parille and William Pinkerton used bolt cutters and drills to rob a manufacturing company of diamond drill bits, which is recreated in the film.

Pacino's character is largely based on Adamson, who began keeping tabs on McCauley's crew, knowing that he had begun committing crimes again. Adamson and McCauley met for coffee once, as portrayed in the film. Their dialogue in the script is based on the conversation that McCauley and Adamson had. The next time that the two met, guns were drawn, which is also mirrored in the movie.

On March 25, 1964, McCauley and members of his regular crew followed an armored car that delivered money to a National Tea grocery store at 4720 S. Cicero Avenue, Chicago. When the drop was made, three of the robbers entered the store. They threatened the clerks and stole money bags worth $13,137 (equivalent to $101,000 in 2025) before getting away amid police gunfire.

McCauley's crew was unaware that Adamson and eight other detectives had blocked off all potential exits. When the getaway car turned down an alley, the robbers saw the blockade and realized they were trapped. All four exited the vehicle and began firing. Russell Bredon (or Breaden) and Michael Parille were slain in an alley while Miklos Polesti (on whom Chris Shiherlis is loosely based) shot his way out and escaped. McCauley was shot to death on the lawn of a nearby home. He was 50 years old and the prime suspect in several burglaries. Polesti was caught days later and sent to prison. Polesti was still alive in 2011.

Adamson went on to a successful career as a television and film producer. He died in 2008 at age 71. Mann's 2009 film Public Enemies is dedicated to Adamson's memory. The character of Nate, played by Jon Voight, is based on criminal-turned-author Edward Bunker, who served as a consultant to Mann on the film.

=== Canceled TV series ===
In 1979, Mann wrote a 180-page draft of Heat. He rewrote it after making Thief in 1981, hoping to find a director to make it and mentioning it publicly in a promotional interview for his 1983 film The Keep. In the late 1980s, he offered the film to his friend, film director Walter Hill, who turned him down. Following the success of Miami Vice and Crime Story, Mann was to produce a new crime television show for NBC. He turned the script that would become Heat into a 90-minute pilot for a television series featuring the Los Angeles Police Department Robbery–Homicide division, featuring Scott Plank in the role of Hanna, and Alex McArthur playing the character of Neil McCauley, renamed to Patrick McLaren.

The pilot was shot in nineteen days, atypical for Mann. The script was shortened to almost a third of its original length, omitting many subplots that made it into Heat. The network was unhappy with Plank as the lead actor, and asked Mann to recast Hanna's role. Mann declined and the show was canceled and the pilot aired on August 27, 1989, as a television film entitled L.A. Takedown, which was eventually released on VHS and DVD in Europe.

== Production ==
=== Pre-production ===
On April 5, 1994, Mann was reported to have abandoned his earlier plan to shoot a biopic of James Dean in favor of directing Heat, producing it with Art Linson. The film marks the first on-screen appearance together of Al Pacino and Robert De Niro. Both actors had starred in The Godfather Part II but, owing to the film's story structure, they are not seen in the same scene. Pacino and De Niro were Mann's first choices for the roles of Hanna and McCauley, respectively, and they both immediately agreed to act.

Mann assigned Janice Polley, a former collaborator on The Last of the Mohicans, as the film's location manager, along with Lori Balton, who primarily handled scouting duties. Scouting locations lasted from August to December 1994. Mann requested locations that had not appeared on film before, in which Balton was successful—fewer than 10 of the 85 filming locations were previously used. The most challenging shooting location proved to be Los Angeles International Airport, with the film crew nearly missing the shot due to a threat to the airport by the Unabomber.

To make the long shootout more realistic, they hired British ex-Special Air Service sergeant Andy McNab as a technical weapons trainer and adviser. He designed a weapons-training curriculum to train the actors for three months using live ammunition before shooting with blanks for the actual take and worked with training them for the bank robbery. The training worked so well, the U.S. Army used parts of the film to train new soldiers.

=== Casting ===
De Niro was the first cast member to receive the film script, showing it to Pacino, who also wanted to be part of the film. De Niro believed that Heat was a "very good story, had a particular feel to it, a reality and authenticity". In 2016, Pacino revealed that he viewed his character as having been under the influence of cocaine throughout the film. Keanu Reeves was offered the role of Chris Shiherlis, but he turned it down in favor of playing Hamlet at the Manitoba Theatre Centre. As a result, Val Kilmer was given the role. Jon Bon Jovi also auditioned. Mann took Kilmer, Sizemore and De Niro to Folsom State Prison to interview actual career criminals to prepare for their roles. While researching her role, Judd met several former prostitutes who became housewives.

Xander Berkeley was considered to reprise his role as Waingro from L.A. Takedown, but a prior commitment to Barb Wire led to a scheduling conflict for that part. He was still offered an appearance as a different character, and is the only actor to show up in both versions.

=== Filming ===
Principal photography for Heat lasted 107 days during the summer of 1995. All of the shooting was done on location in and around Los Angeles due to Mann's decision not to use a soundstage. Among the key filming locations were the Citigroup Center, where the bank heist and police shootout takes place, and the Kate Mantilini restaurant, which serves as the location of the meeting over coffee between Pacino and De Niro's characters.

The film's cinematographer Dante Spinotti used a combination of natural and practical lighting to capture grittiness and realism for the film. The film's visual style also captures the vastness of Los Angeles and the isolation of its characters within the urban sprawl. Mann and Spinotti often use wide shots and long takes to create a sense of scale and immersion.

Both Al Pacino and Robert De Niro prepared extensively for their roles. They spent time with real detectives and criminals to understand their characters in depth. The diner scene with Pacino and De Niro was shot with minimal rehearsals to maintain the spontaneity and intensity of their interaction. Mann used multiple cameras to capture the scene from different angles, focusing on close-ups to highlight the tension and subtleties of each actor's performance.

== Soundtrack ==
On December 19, 1995, Warner Bros. Records released a soundtrack album on cassette and CD to accompany the film, titled Heat: Music from the Motion Picture. The album is produced by Matthias Gohl. It contains a 29-minute selection of the film score composed by Elliot Goldenthal, as well as songs by other artists, such as U2 and Brian Eno (collaborating as Passengers), Terje Rypdal, Moby and Lisa Gerrard.

Heat uses an abridged instrumental rendition of the Joy Division song "New Dawn Fades" by Moby, which is also featured in the same form on the soundtrack album. Mann reused the Einstürzende Neubauten track "Armenia" in his 1999 film The Insider. The film ends with Moby's "God Moving Over the Face of the Waters", a different version of which is included at the end of the soundtrack album.

Mann and Goldenthal decided on an atmospheric situation for the film soundtrack. Goldenthal uses a setup consisting of multiple guitars, which he termed "guitar orchestra", and thought that it brought the film score closer to a European style.

== Release ==
=== Box office ===
Heat was released on December 15, 1995, and opened at the box office with $8.4 million from 1,325 theaters, finishing in third place behind Jumanji and Toy Story. It went on to earn a total gross of $67.4 million in United States, and $120 million in foreign box offices. Heat was ranked the No. 25 highest-grossing film of 1995.

=== Home media ===
Heat was released on VHS on November 12, 1996, by Warner Home Video. Due to its long runtime, the film had to be released on two separate cassettes. A DVD release followed on July 27, 1999. A two-disc special-edition DVD was released by Warner Home Video on February 22, 2005, featuring an audio commentary by Michael Mann, deleted scenes and numerous documentaries detailing the film's production. This edition contains the original theatrical cut.

The initial Blu-ray release was by Warner Home Video on November 10, 2009, featuring a high-definition film transfer, supervised by Mann. Among the disc extras are Mann's audio commentary, a one-hour documentary about the making of the film, and ten minutes of scenes deleted from the film. As well as approving the look of the transfer, Mann also recut two scenes slightly differently, referring to them as "new content changes".

A "Director's Definitive Edition" blu-ray was released on May 9, 2017, by 20th Century Fox Home Entertainment, who acquired the distribution rights to the film through their part-ownership of Regency back in 2015. Sourced from a 4K remaster of the film supervised by Mann, the two-disc set contains all the extras from the 2009 Blu-ray, with two filmmakers panels from 2015 and 2016, one of which was moderated by Christopher Nolan.

A 4K Ultra HD Blu-ray Ultimate Collector's Edition of Heat that contains the Director's Definitive Edition of the film on UHD Blu-ray and Blu-ray, along with legacy bonus materials released on August 9, 2022, by Walt Disney Studios Home Entertainment (under the 20th Century Studios label), was released coinciding with the release date of Mann's sequel novel. Unlike the previous home media releases, the Director's Definitive Edition Blu-ray and the 4K Ultra HD Blu-ray Ultimate Collector's Edition did not feature the Warner Bros. Pictures logo at the beginning, although the in-credit closing is retained.

Heat was broadcast on NBC television on January 3, 1999, in a significantly edited version. Mann had offered the network some scenes that had been filmed but omitted from the theatrical edit with hope of having the film shown in four hours (with commercials) over two nights. Instead, NBC chose to cut nearly 40 minutes from the theatrical version so that Heat could be shown in a three-hour time slot (with commercials). Mann told Variety, "They cut so much out of the movie that they destroyed the narrative of the film along with its integrity.... Too much time was taken out of the film that wasn't due to language or other content." As a result, Mann had his director's credit on the TV version replaced with the pseudonym "Alan Smithee".

== Reception ==
On Rotten Tomatoes, Heat holds an approval rating of 84%, based on 157 reviews and an average rating of 8/10. The website's critical consensus reads, "Though Al Pacino and Robert De Niro share but a handful of screen minutes together, Heat is an engrossing crime drama that draws compelling performances from its stars – and confirms Michael Mann's mastery of the genre." On Metacritic, the film has a weighted average score of 76 out of 100, based on 22 critics, indicating "generally favorable" reviews. Audiences polled by CinemaScore gave the film an average grade of "A−" on a scale of A+ to F.

Roger Ebert of the Chicago Sun-Times gave the film three and a half stars out of four. He described Mann's script as "uncommonly literate", with a psychological insight into the symbiotic relationship between police and criminals, and the fractured intimacy between the male and female characters: "It's not just an action picture. Above all, the dialogue is complex enough to allow the characters to say what they're thinking: They are eloquent, insightful, fanciful, poetic when necessary. They're not trapped with cliches. Of the many imprisonments possible in our world, one of the worst must be to be inarticulate – to be unable to tell another person what you really feel."

Simon Cote of The Austin Chronicle called the film "one of the most intelligent crime-thrillers to come along in years", and said Pacino and De Niro's scenes together were "poignant and gripping". Kenneth Turan of the Los Angeles Times called the film a "sleek, accomplished piece of work, meticulously controlled and completely involving. The dark end of the street doesn't get much more inviting than this."

Todd McCarthy of Variety wrote, "Stunningly made and incisively acted by a large and terrific cast, Michael Mann's ambitious study of the relativity of good and evil stands apart from other films of its type by virtue of its extraordinarily rich characterizations and its thoughtful, deeply melancholy take on modern life." Owen Gleiberman of Entertainment Weekly gave it a B− rating, saying, "Mann's action scenes ... have an existential, you-are-there jitteriness", but called the heist-planning and Hanna's investigation scenes "dry, talky".

The film was nominated for two Saturn Awards, Best Action/Adventure Film and Kilmer for Best Supporting Actor, but lost to The Usual Suspects and 12 Monkeys respectively. Kilmer was also nominated for Most Desirable Male at the MTV Movie Awards along with Batman Forever, while Natalie Portman was nominated for Best Young Supporting Actress in the 17th Youth in Film Awards. Rolling Stone ranked Heat #28 on its list of "The 100 Greatest Movies of the '90s", and The Guardian ranked it #22 on its list of "The Greatest Crime Films of All Time", while other publications have noted its influence on numerous subsequent films.

== Impact ==
French career criminal Rédoine Faïd told Mann at a film festival, "You were my technical adviser". The media described later robberies as resembling scenes from Heat, including armored car robberies in South Africa, Colombia, and Norway, and the 1997 North Hollywood shootout, in which Larry Phillips Jr. and Emil Mătăsăreanu robbed the North Hollywood branch of the Bank of America and, similarly to the film, were confronted by the LAPD as they left the bank. A copy of Heat was found in the VCR at Phillips's residence. The shootout was one of the longest and bloodiest events of its type in American police history. Both robbers were killed, and eleven police officers and seven civilians were injured during the shootout. Heat was often referred to during the coverage of the shootout.

For The Dark Knight (2008), director Christopher Nolan drew inspiration in his portrayal of Gotham City from Heat to tell "the story of a city". In 2016, a year after the 20th anniversary of Heat, Nolan moderated a Q&A session with Mann and the rest of the film's cast at the Samuel Goldwyn Theater.

Heat inspired the crime video game series Grand Theft Auto, influencing Grand Theft Auto III (2001), Grand Theft Auto IV (2008), and Grand Theft Auto V (2013). Director Mia Hansen-Løve stated she is "obsessed" with Heat and said her films share the film's themes but feature them "in a very different way, in a very different world".

The video game Payday: The Heist takes heavy inspiration from Heat. Several heists in the game are nearly identical to some scenes from the film. Such as the heist Heat Street referencing the movie in its name and being similar to the street shootout scene from the film.

== Sequel ==
On March 16, 2016, Mann announced that he was developing a Heat prequel novel, as a part of launching his company Michael Mann Books. On April 27, 2017, Reed Farrel Coleman joined the project as co-author. On May 15, 2020, Mann stated that the novel would function as both a prequel and a sequel, with plot taking place before and after the film's main events. By January 19, 2022, it was revealed that the novel would be a collaboration between Mann and Meg Gardiner; titled Heat 2, it was eventually released in August 2022.

In September 2019, Mann stated he intended to produce an adaptation of the novel, acknowledging film and television as possible media for release. By July 5, 2022, Mann reaffirmed his plans to adapt the novel follow-up into a feature film, while stating that the principal cast from the first installment may be recast for the adaptation. In April 2023, it was reported that the adaptation was in development. In October 2025, Amazon MGM Studios picked up the rights from Warner Bros. after they disagreed with Mann on the film's budget. Jerry Bruckheimer joined the project as producer along with Scott Stuber, under the United Artists division. Between December 2025 and July 2026, Christian Bale and Leonardo DiCaprio confirmed they would play Vincent Hanna and Chris Shiherlis after months of negotiations. Stephen Graham will portray a younger version of Neil McCauley. Production is set to begin in November with a budget of $170 million.

== See also ==
- Heist film
