= Heat 2 =

2022 novel by Michael Mann and Meg Gardiner

- First edition cover
- Author: Michael Mann; Meg Gardiner
- Cover artist: Jacket design by Tony Mauro Logo design by Neville Brody
- Language: English
- Genre: crime fiction, thriller, mystery fiction, detective fiction
- Publisher: HarperCollins
- Publication date: August 9, 2022
- Publication place: United States
- Media type: Print (hardcover & paperback) ebook Audiobook
- Pages: 480 pp (first edition, hardcover)
- ISBN: 978-0-062-65331-4 first edition, hardcover
- Preceded by: Heat (1995 film)

Heat 2 is a 2022 American crime novel written by Michael Mann and Meg Gardiner. It is Mann's debut novel, and both a prequel and a sequel to his 1995 crime film Heat. It covers the formative years of homicide detective Vincent Hanna and criminals Neil McCauley and Chris Shiherlis. The novel's prologue is set immediately after the film's ending before moving to 1988, 1995–96 and 2000 through multiple locations in North America, South America and Southeast Asia.

Announced in 2016 as a prequel, Heat 2 released in August 2022 and landed on the New York Times bestseller list. Heat 2 was part of a renewed era of productivity for Mann, debuting a few months after his Tokyo Vice pilot and culminating the following year with the release of his passion project Ferrari, Mann's first film in eight years. (Note: Mann's previous feature, Blackhat, was released in 2015.) In 2026, Mann plans to direct a feature film adaptation starring Christian Bale, Leonardo DiCaprio, and Adam Driver as well as write possible follow up novels.

== Plot ==
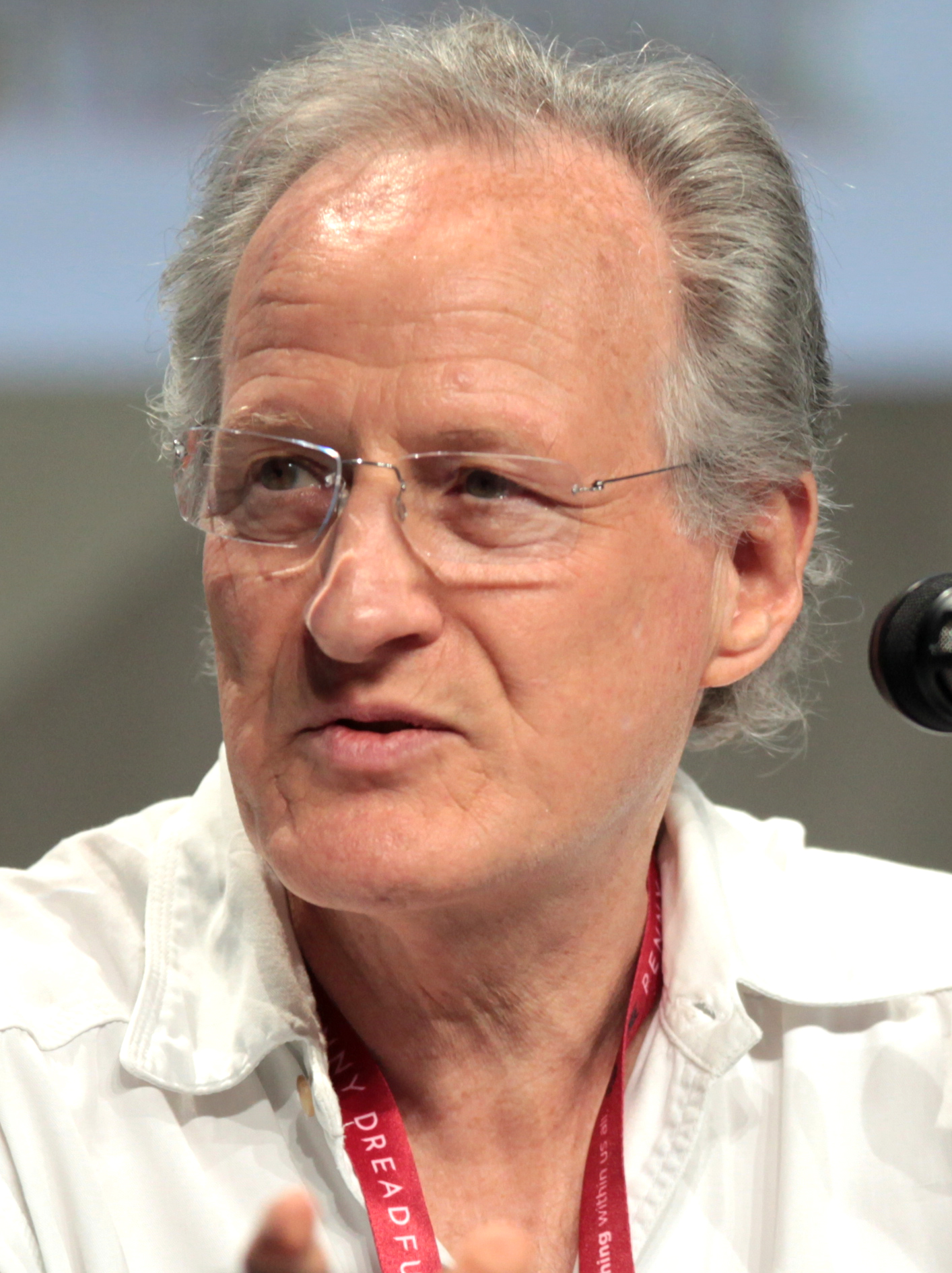
Author Michael Mann, writer/director of Heat. Heat 2 is his debut novel.

In 1988 Chicago, Detective Vincent Hanna pursues the psychopathic Otis Wardell's gang of vicious home invaders. Vincent and his team ambush Otis's crew at their next score, but the latter escapes. Vincent raids Aaron, Otis's supplier, only to find a dismembered Aaron. Realizing that his quarry has vanished and disenchanted with the politics of the Chicago Police Department, Vincent resigns.

Concurrent to those events, Neil McCauley, Chris Shiherlis and Michael Cerrito infiltrate and rob safe deposit boxes in Chicago with equipment supplied by Aaron. Neil returns to Los Angeles and reunites with his girlfriend Elisa and her eight-year-old daughter Gabriela. Neil has a set of floppy disks from their Chicago score analyzed, which reveal movements of cartel cash trucks; following the trucks lead them to a stash house in Mexicali.

Neil's gang, now including Elisa, go to Mexicali and survey the stash house while Otis, having tortured their whereabouts out of Aaron, stalks them. Neil and his crew raid the stash house and leave with the money after a firefight. Otis arrives at the group's safe house, murders Elisa's uncle and kidnaps Elisa while Gabriela hides. Otis forces Elisa to set a meet with Neil, who rushes to rescue Elisa and manages to disable Otis's vehicle. Otis holds Elisa at gunpoint and demands Neil surrender his car, full of the heist money, for her safety. Neil complies but Otis mortally wounds Elisa and flees. A despondent Neil clutches the dying Elisa and vows to close his heart. (Note: Neil's mantra in the 1995 film is "Don't let yourself get attached to anything you are not willing to walk out on in 30 seconds flat if you feel the heat around the corner.")

In 1995 Los Angeles, Vincent hunts Chris, the sole survivor of Neil's gang after a botched bank robbery. (Note: Immediately after the events of the 1995 film) Nate hides the wounded Chris in Koreatown and coordinates an out for him, barely getting Chris across the Mexican border before the latter is flown to Ciudad del Este. Upon his arrival, Chris recuperates and works security for David Liu's Taiwanese-Paraguayan Liu crime family. The family includes the intelligent Ana and the unstable Felix, with tradition dictating the latter inherit the enterprise. In 1996, Chris foils an attempt by rival Taiwanese Claudio Chen to steal the Liu's GPS jammer program. Chris, using his tradecraft, delivers malware-infested software to the Chens. After the intrusion is discovered, Chris negotiates a truce. He and Ana begin an illicit romance.

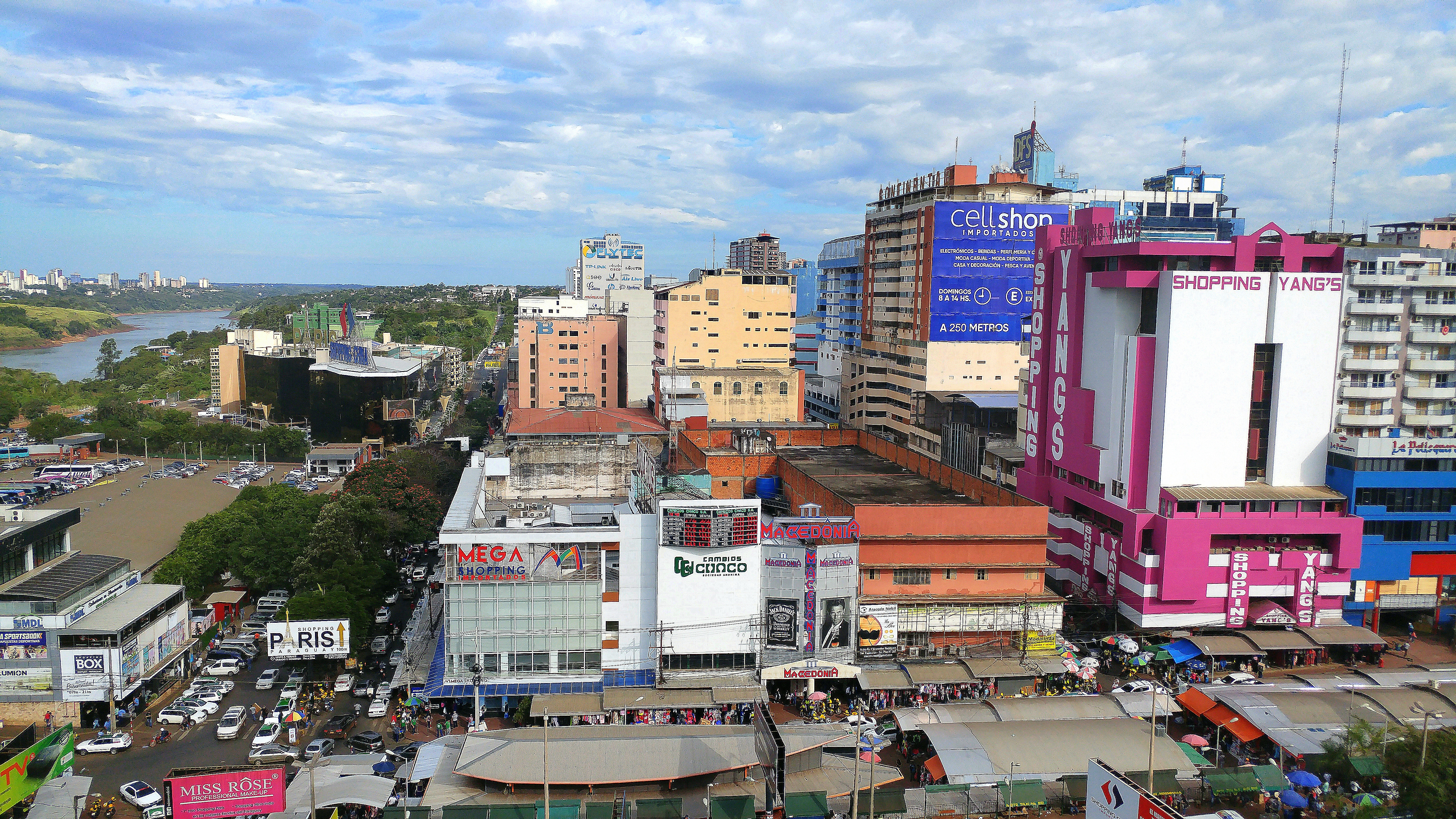
Ciudad del Este. Chris is sent here immediately after the events of the 1995 film.

In 2000 Los Angeles, Vincent investigates the sadistic murder of a prostitute committed by Otis, who has established a prostitution ring with the money from Neil's Mexicali score. Ana and Chris arrive in Los Angeles for business but Claudio and Felix, now allied, cut in. Seeking their own enterprise, Chris and Ana are introduced to the dark web. Despite his feelings for Ana, Chris attempts to reunite with his wife Charlene and their son Dominick but ultimately decides to let them go when he sees they have a new family. Claudio engineers an assassination attempt on David Liu, severely wounding him, and Felix becomes the head of the Liu family.

An adult Gabriela runs into Otis and reports him to the LAPD. Vincent attempts to locate Otis but the latter, who had also recognized Gabriela, kidnaps her. Chris, seeking vengeance for Neil, follows Vincent as the latter attempts to rescue Gabriela. A violent freeway chase ensues which ends when Gabriela causes Otis to crash. Chris recognizes Gabriela and leads her to safety while Vincent kills Otis in the crash wreckage. Reviewing security footage in the aftermath, Vincent's partner Casals realizes Chris was present and vows continued pursuit.

In Batam, Claudio and Felix offer to negotiate a truce with Chris. They arrive at a factory to make a deal, but Chris knows they are aiming to kill him and Ana and absorb their business. Chris counter ambushes and eliminates Claudio and his team. A wounded Felix pleads for his life, assuring Chris that Ana would have been safe. An unmoved Chris executes Felix. Ana and Chris meet shortly after, and Chris tells her that Felix was killed in crossfire, knowing Ana would leave him if she knew the truth.

Back in Los Angeles, Vincent arrives at Nate's bar and asks him "What are you not gonna tell me about Chris Shiherlis?"

== Development ==
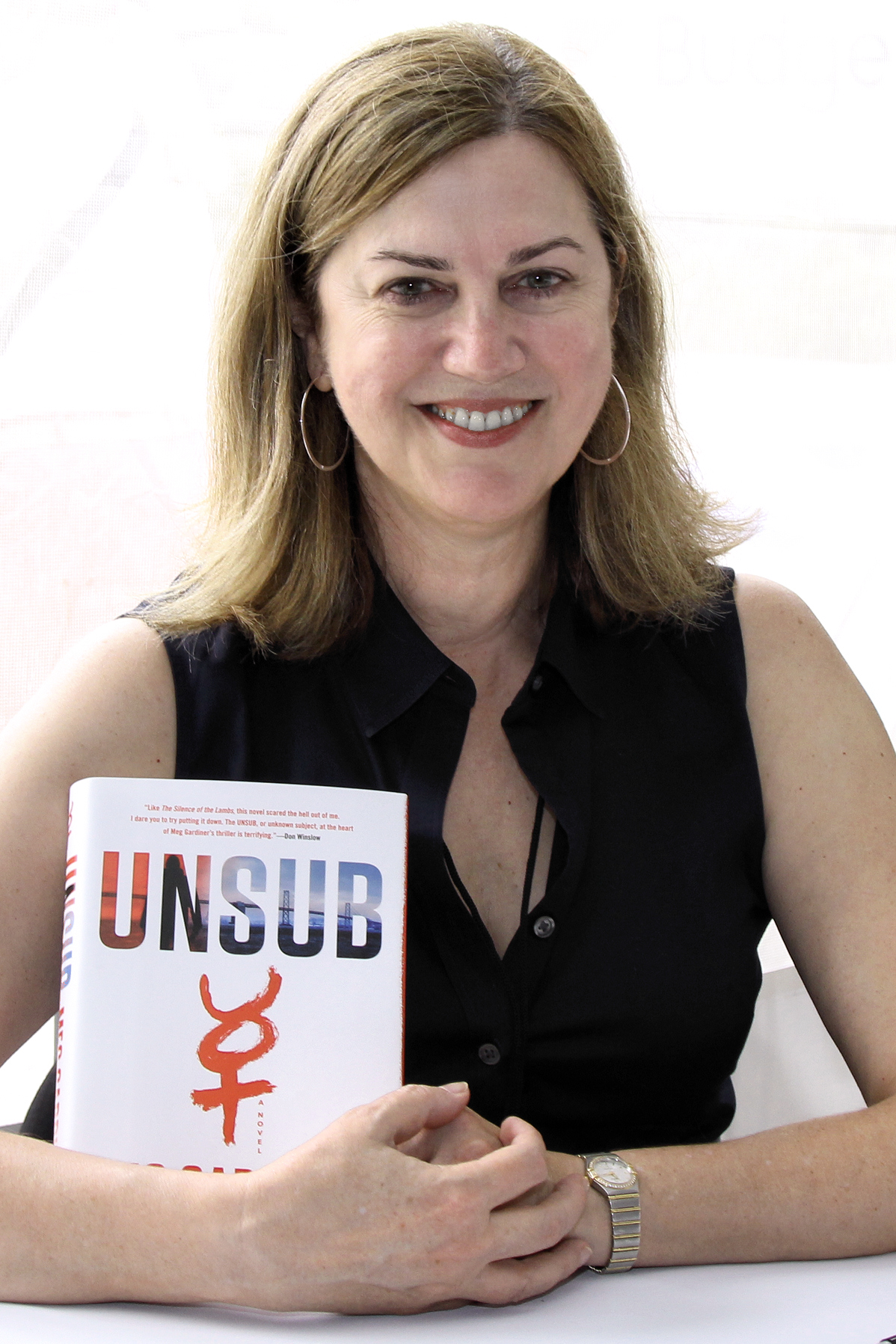
Co-author Meg Gardiner, whose participation was announced in 2022

It was announced in March 2016 that Mann was writing a prequel novel to the film Heat. After an extensive search for a collaborator, Reed Farrel Coleman was announced as Mann's co-writer the following year. In mid-2019, Mann clarified the novel would act as both a prequel and a sequel, and that he and Coleman were still at work on the novel for a 2020 release. The novel was originally intended to showcase the childhood of Chris and the time Neil spent in prison, neither of which plot threads ended up in the published version.

The novel's title, synopsis and release date were officially revealed in January 2022 with Meg Gardiner now listed as the co-author. Mann, a fan of Gardiner's novel UNSUB, was introduced to her by his literary agent Shane Salerno. As is customary for Mann, an extensive backstory was built for the characters when he made Heat, including Neil's and Chris' childhoods. Gardiner used this material to prioritize the prequel sections of the novel, and remarked on Mann's zealous quest for authenticity.

In addition to material accumulated from the first film, Mann used research from other projects and various real-life events to form the novel. Hanna's experiences in South Vietnam were based on Mann's unmade project on the Battle of Hue, and the novel's Batam sequence was based partly on one of Mann's unmade films. Hanna's restlessness with his surroundings, manifested by dangerous late night drives, was based on Mann's own behaviors in his younger years. The robberies that begin the novel, along with the efforts of the police to foil them, were based on a real case undertaken by regular Chicago detectives Charlie Adamson and Dennis Farina, both of whom collaborated with Mann several times. These robberies also inspired the Miami Vice episode "The Home Invaders." Hanna's late night visits to one of the early victims was based on behavior Mann observed from a real life detective that he wrote into an episode of Police Story. The Spoon Jackson poem "Realness", featured in the novel, was also fashioned into a speech by Bundini in Ali.

Released in August, Heat 2 immediately landed on the New York Times bestseller list. Interviewed for the book's launch, Mann expressed his goal of expanding the "Heat universe" through additional books, including exploring the next stage of Chris Shiherlis' journey.

== Planned film adaptation ==
Prior to the novel's publication, Mann stated his intention to adapt it into a film. In a December 2019 interview, Mann revealed he had casting ideas for who would play Neil and Vincent in Heat 2.

It was formally announced in April 2023 that Mann would write and direct an adaptation of Heat 2 for Warner Bros., with Adam Driver in talks to portray the young Neil. Several months later, Mann confirmed Heat 2 would be his next film and that he had spoken to Driver about playing Neil. Further casting rumors included Al Pacino returning as Vincent, Austin Butler portraying Chris, and Ana de Armas portraying Elisa. Actors Jeremy Allen White and Channing Tatum were also reported to be actively pursuing roles in the film. During press for Ferrari and The Bikeriders respectively, Driver and Butler declined comment on their participation in Heat 2.

While acknowledging the novel's length and scope would be well suited for a two-part streaming service presentation, Mann expressed desire to make a single, large scale theatrical release. Mann explained his primary challenge for the screenplay was finding a way to distill the novel's myriad threads into a single motion picture. Due to the novel taking place over many years, Mann said he would employ a combination of CGI and makeup on various actors but eschew de-aging techniques like those used in The Irishman. At a screening of Heat, Mann revealed he was considering shooting Heat 2 on celluloid, which would mark his first shot-on-film project since 2001's Ali. (Note: Although his next few films were shot in part on film, Ali was Mann's last film shot almost entirely in the medium.) Mann also began seeking permission to film on location in Ciudad del Este, where portions of Miami Vice were filmed. Mann had also planned on shooting a large-scale shootout in Ciudad del Este for Miami Vice's ending, but this was scrapped due to co-star Jamie Foxx abandoning the production after nearby street violence made the actor too anxious to continue shooting in Paraguay.

In January 2024, Mann shared his goal of shooting Heat 2 for a 2025 release, which would mark the 30th anniversary of the first film. In July, Mann said his aim was to begin filming by the end of 2024 or the beginning of 2025. When asked about the casting of Butler and Driver, Mann stated "I can't talk about that." In August, Mann explained that he was writing the screenplay seven days a week and that the film would at least match the scope of the original. Mann further updated that Heat 2 would shoot on location in Paraguay, Mexicali, Chicago, Los Angeles and Batam.

In March 2025, Mann submitted his first draft of the screenplay to Warner Bros. In August, Matthew Belloni reported that the studio apprehension led Mann to lower his initial $200 million budget request to $170 million. Belloni also reported that Apple Studios was being considered as a potential co-financier, following the success of F1, and that Leonardo DiCaprio was in discussions for a role. During his masterclass at the Busan International Film Festival in September, Mann stated he was hoping to begin filming Heat 2 in 2026 and was working through casting and budgeting.

After being unable to settle on a budget for the project, Warner Bros. exited the project in August 2025, allowing Mann to shop it to other studios. In October, Amazon MGM Studios' United Artists label beat out studios including Paramount Pictures and Sony Pictures for rights to the project, with Scott Stuber, Jerry Bruckheimer, and Nick Nesbitt attached as producers, and DiCaprio, Driver, Butler, and Bradley Cooper reportedly in talks for roles in the film. Eric Roth, a collaborator of Mann and Shane Salerno, both serve as executive producers.

While receiving an award at Lumière, Mann declined to comment on casting but confirmed that the film had moved to United Artists due to budget requirements for the large scale, multi country shoot. Mann also reaffirmed his aim to shoot in 2026 for a 2027 release. The film, budgeted at $150 million, is also slated to receive $37.2 million in California tax credits, with a 77-day shoot planned in Los Angeles in 2026.

In November 2025, Christian Bale was reported to be playing a major role in the film. The following month, Leonardo DiCaprio confirmed his involvement in the film, followed by Bale two months later. Mann stated his plan was to begin production on August 3, 2026. In May 2026, it was reported Jason Clarke would be considered for an undisclosed role. Additional production information surfaced in July, specifying that DiCaprio and Bale were close to finalizing deals to play Chris and Vincent respectively. Further casting conversations included Stephen Graham for Neil and Driver for Otis. Bale, Clarke and Graham had previously worked with Mann on Public Enemies. In August, Odessa Young and newcomer María Cid were in talks to play Charlene and Gabi. Production for Heat 2 is planned for a November 2026 start with a budget of $170 million. In September 2026, Ebon Moss-Bachrach entered final negotiations to play Kelso. It's unclear whether New Regency is still involved or not.
