= Thief (film) =

1981 film by Michael Mann

- Theatrical release poster
- Directed by: Michael Mann
- Screenplay by: Michael Mann
- Story by: Michael Mann
- Based on: The Home Invaders (1975 memoir) by Frank Hohimer
- Produced by: Jerry Bruckheimer; Ronnie Caan
- Starring: James Caan; Tuesday Weld; Robert Prosky; Willie Nelson; James Belushi
- Cinematography: Donald E. Thorin
- Edited by: Dov Hoenig
- Music by: Tangerine Dream
- Production company: Mann/Caan Productions
- Distributed by: United Artists
- Release date: March 27, 1981 (U.S./Canada)
- Running time: 123 minutes
- Country: United States
- Language: English
- Budget: $5.5 million
- Box office: $11.5 million

Thief (also screened as Violent Streets) is a 1981 American neo-noir crime film written and directed by Michael Mann in his feature film debut. It stars James Caan as a professional safecracker trying to escape his life of crime, and Tuesday Weld as his wife. The supporting cast includes Jim Belushi, Robert Prosky, Dennis Farina, and Willie Nelson. The screenplay is credited as an adaptation of the 1975 memoir The Home Invaders: Confessions of a Cat Burglar by former cat burglar Frank Hohimer, although Mann did not use any material from the book. The original musical score was composed and performed by Tangerine Dream.

Produced independently by Jerry Bruckheimer and James Caan's brother Ronnie, Thief was screened at the 1981 Cannes Film Festival, where it competed for the Palme d'Or. It was released in the United States by United Artists on March 27, 1981, to widespread critical acclaim. Thief earned $11.5 million at the box office, on a $5.5 million budget.

== Plot ==
Frank, a convicted jewel thief, is released from the Joliet Correctional Center. He returns to a pair of Chicago businesses, including a car lot, serving as fronts for his criminal enterprise. One part of his life's goals is missing: a family with Jessie, a cashier he is dating.

After taking part in a major jewel robbery, Frank gives the diamonds to his fence, Joe Gags. Before Frank can collect his share, Gags is thrown from a twelve-story window for stealing from his loan shark clients. Barry, Frank's associate, discovers that Attaglia, a plating company executive Gags was working for, was the one who killed Gags and stole Frank's payoff. Frank confronts him at the plating company to demand his money back, then meets Attaglia's employer Leo, a high-level fence and Chicago Outfit boss. Leo had been receiving Frank's goods from Gags for some time. Leo returns the money and says he wants Frank working directly for him. Their meeting is under covert police surveillance.

Frank is reluctant, but a conversation with Jessie changes his mind when she agrees to be part of his life. He agrees to do one big score for Leo and tells Barry it will be their last job. Having been rejected by the state adoption agency, Frank acquires a baby boy on the black market with Leo's help.

After resisting a shakedown from a group of corrupt police detectives, Frank and his crew execute a large-scale diamond heist in Los Angeles. Frank expects the agreed-upon sum of $830,000 for his part in the heist, but Leo gives him less than $100,000, saying he invested the rest of Frank's cut in Texas shopping centers against Frank's wishes. Leo has also committed Frank to a robbery in Palm Beach without consulting him. Frank tells Leo that their partnership is over and demands the rest of his money in 24 hours.

Frank is ambushed at his car lot by Leo's henchmen, who kill Barry and kidnap Frank. Leo threatens Frank's family if he doesn't continue working for him. Frank returns home, tells Jessie their marriage is over and that she must immediately leave the house. Frank instructs an associate to relocate her, the baby, and $410,000 in cash somewhere they can't be located.

With nothing to lose, Frank blows up their home using high-explosive charges, then does the same to his legitimate business fronts. He breaks into Leo's house and pistol whips Attaglia and kills Leo. Before he can escape he's confronted by Leo's bodyguards and is shot in the ensuing gunfight. Frank kills all three of Leo's men, loosens the bulletproof vest under his jacket, and walks away into the night.

== Cast ==
- James Caan as Frank
- Tuesday Weld as Jessie
- Willie Nelson as David "Okla" Bertinneau
- James Belushi as Barry
- Robert Prosky as Leo
- Tom Signorelli as Attaglia
- Dennis Farina as Carl
- Nick Nickeas as Nick
- W.R. Bill Brown as Mitch
- Norm Tobin as Guido
- John Santucci as Sergeant Urizzi
- Gavin MacFadyen as Detective Boreksco
- Chuck Adamson as Detective Ancell
- Sam Cirone as Detective Martello
- Spero Anast as Detective Bukowski
- Walter Scott as Detective Simpson
- Hal Frank as Joe "Gags"
- Patti Ross as Marie
- Mike Genovese as Ian
- Nathan Davis as Grossman
- Michael Paul Chan as Chinese Waiter
- William Petersen as Katz & Jammer Bartender
- Ron L. Cox as Guy in Bar
- Del Close, Bruce A. Young and John Kapelos as Mechanics

== Background ==
Thief marked the feature film debut of Michael Mann as director, screenwriter and executive producer, after five years in television drama.

Mann made his directorial debut with the TV film The Jericho Mile. This was partly shot in Folsom Prison. Mann says that influenced the writing of Thief:

It probably informed my ability to imagine what Frank's life was like, where he was from, and what those 12 or 13 years in prison were like for him. The idea of creating his character, was to have somebody who has been outside of society. An outsider who has been removed from the evolution of everything from technology to the music that people listen to, to how you talk to a girl, to what do you want with your life and how do you go about getting it. Everything that's normal development, that we experience, he was excluded from, by design. In the design of the character and the engineering of the character, that was the idea.

== Production ==
=== Development ===
While developing the script, Mann optioned former cat burglar Frank Hohimer's memoir The Home Invaders: Confessions of a Cat Burglar. He ultimately decided not to use any of the book material in his screenplay, but Hohimer's book received screen credit under the option terms.

Mann made James Caan do research as a thief for his role, and said:

I always find it interesting, people who are aware, alert, conscious of what they do and are pretty good at it... People who want to put in 50-60 hours a week and go home and are not really conscious of life moving by, don't really interest me very much... As part of the curriculum designed for an actor getting into character, I try to imagine what's going to really help bring this actor more fully into character. And so I try to imagine what experiences are going to make more dimensional his intake of Frank, so that he is Frank spontaneously when I'm shooting. So one of the most obvious things is it'd be pretty good if [James Caan] was as good at doing what Frank does as is Frank.

The character Leo was patterned after Chicago Outfit bosses Felix Alderisio and Leo Rugendorf.

=== Casting ===
Thief marks the first film appearance of actors Dennis Farina, William Petersen, James Belushi and Robert Prosky. At the time a Chicago police officer, Farina appears as a mob henchman. Conversely, John Santucci (real name: John Schiavone), who plays the role of corrupt cop Urizzi, was a recently paroled thief on whom the character Frank was partly based, and acted as a technical adviser on the film. Another actor in the film, W.R. 'Bill' Brown, was also a former safecracker and associate of Joseph Scalise. Chuck Adamson (Detective Ancell) and Nick Nickeas (Nick) were also Chicago police officers, while Gavin MacFadyen, who plays Detective Boresko, was a journalist who later served as adviser to Mann's 1999 film The Insider.

In 1986, Farina and Santucci both were cast in Mann and Adamson's TV series Crime Story, Farina as a Chicago police lieutenant and Santucci as a jewel thief. Petersen, who later would star (along with Farina) in the Mann film Manhunter, appears briefly as a barman at a club. The influential Chicago improv teacher Del Close has a brief appearance as a mechanic, in a scene that was improvised with the other mechanic actors.

=== Filming ===
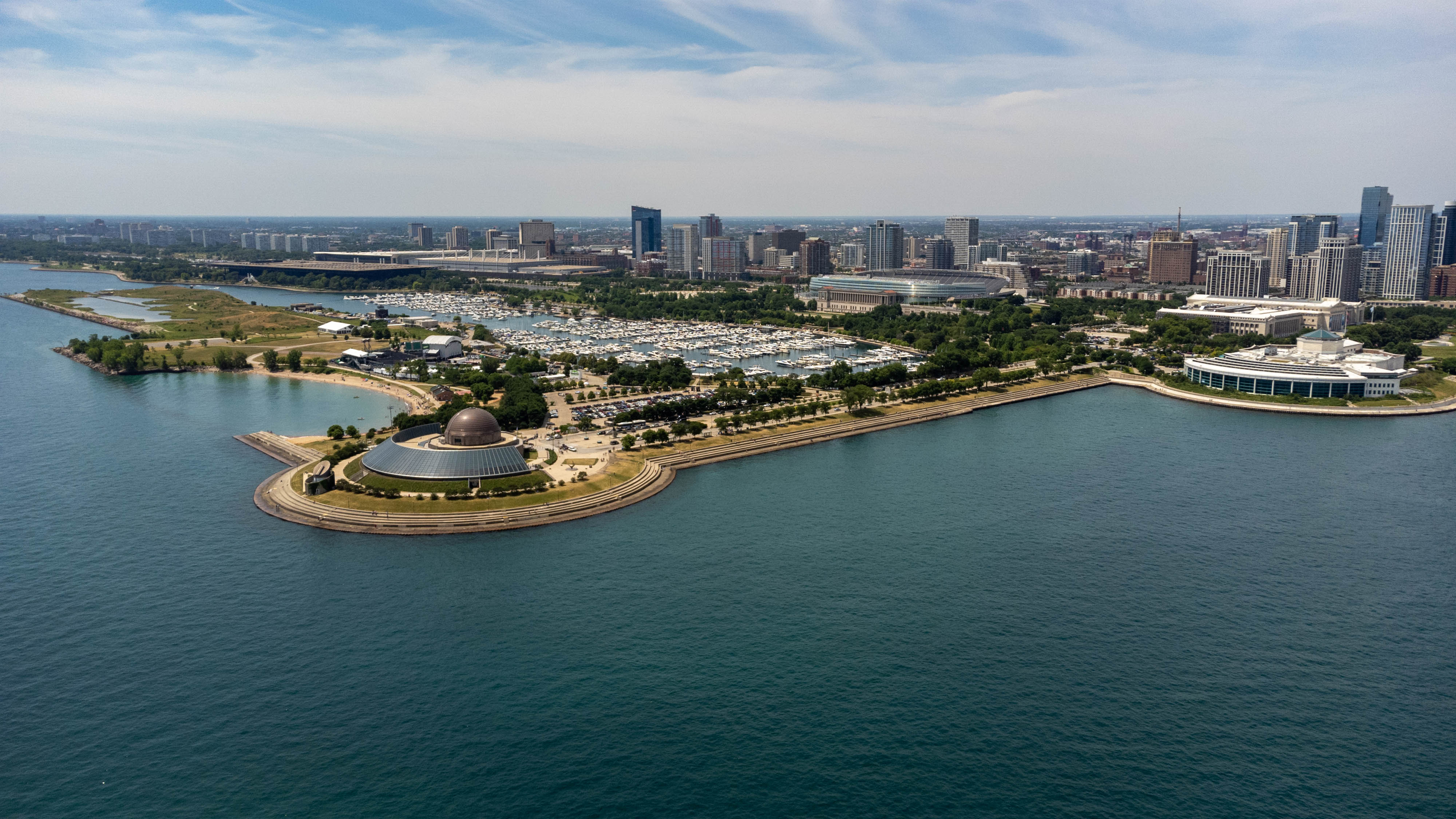
Museum Campus park in Chicago, one of the filming locations used in Thief.

Thief was filmed on-location in Chicago and Los Angeles. Jerry Bruckheimer and Ronnie Caan served as the film's producers. Being Michael Mann's feature film directorial debut, Thief showcases many of the cinematic techniques that would later become his trademarks. Chief among these is the cinematography (by Donald E. Thorin), using light and shadow to give the proceedings, especially those taking place in the darkness of night, a sense of danger. The film also earns plaudits for its meticulous attention to detail: the tools and techniques of the trade, right down to the oxy lance used to penetrate a safe, are authentic, the result of Mann's decision to hire real-life thieves to serve as technical advisers. The still of Frank holding a gun on Attaglia as he attempts to recover his money in an early scene was used for one of the movie's posters.

Near the end of the film, Frank destroys his house. The film company built a false front onto a real house and attempted to destroy it with explosives. The explosions severely damaged the real house, however, leading to its demolition. James Caan's emotional several-minute monolog with Weld in a coffee shop is often cited as the film's high point, and Caan has long considered the scene his favorite of his career. The actor liked the movie although he found the part challenging to play. "I like to be emotionally available but this guy is available to nothing."

=== Music ===
Mann has gained a reputation as a director who uses cutting-edge music for his films.

Thief's moody soundscapes were composed and performed by Tangerine Dream. The soundtrack was the second of many notable film scores composed by the group throughout the 1980s. The film was nominated for a Razzie Award for Worst Musical Score, but that did not deter Mann from choosing them a second time to compose the music for his next feature film, the ill-fated 1983 World War II fantasy horror The Keep.

He originally intended to score the film with Chicago blues music, but ultimately felt that this choice might hamper the film's resonance with a wider audience. Mann said in a 2014 interview: "I felt that to be so regionally specific in the music choice would make Frank's experience specific only to Frank. So I wanted the kind of transparency, if you like, the formality of electronic music, and hence Tangerine Dream." He utilizes jazz/blues in one scene when Frank races to meet Jessie after the offer from Leo, transitioning from the meetup, all the way to the jazz club.

Additional music cues were composed by Craig Safan.

== Release ==
Under the working title Violent Streets, the film debuted in-competition at the 34th Cannes Film Festival. It went on to open in theaters in the United States on March 27, 1981.

=== Home media ===
The film was released on Blu-ray and 4K Blu-ray by the Criterion Collection.

== Reception ==
=== Box office ===
In the U.S., Thief earned a modest $4.3 million. While not a financial success in its initial release, the film has become a reference point in Mann's career, especially with the release of his crime epic, Heat, with which this movie has many similarities.

=== Critical response ===
On the review aggregator website Rotten Tomatoes, 80% of 85 critics' reviews are positive, with an average rating of 7.7/10. The website's consensus reads: "Thief's enigmatic conclusion will rob some audiences of satisfaction, but it's an authentic and sleekly rendered neo-noir, powered by a swaggering James Caan at the peak of his charisma." Metacritic, which uses a weighted average, assigned the film a score of 78 out of 100, based on eight critics, indicating "generally favorable" reviews. Audiences polled by CinemaScore gave the film an average grade of "B−" on an A+ to F scale.

Vincent Canby criticized Mann in The New York Times, saying that "he's going to have to learn how to edit himself, to resist the temptation to allow dialogue that is colorful to turn, all of a sudden, into deep, abiding purple". He panned the film as "a gangster melodrama so high-toned that the characters were identified not by names but by their occupations" while being "an action film so unfortunately convinced that ordinary movies can be elevated to cinema if the characters talk fancy enough and if the camera consistently turns the most commonplace objects into beautiful abstractions of reality".

Roger Ebert described Thief as "one of the most intelligent thrillers I've seen" and gave the film 3 1/2 out of 4 stars, writing that "If Thief has a weak point, it is probably in the handling of the Willie Nelson character" and went further, stating: "Willie has played the character so well that we wanted more. But, then, I suppose it is a good thing when a movie creates characters we feel that strongly about, and Thief is populated with them. It's a thriller with plausible people in it. How rare."

== Bibliography ==
- Kirsch, Konrad (2024). From ›Doodlebug" to "Oppenheimer‹. An Analysis of Christopher Nolan's Film Work (p.43). Stuttgart / London: Edition Axel Menges. ISBN 978-3-86905-037-9.
