= Chuck Adamson =

American police officer and filmmaker (1936–2008)

- Born: Charles Fredrick Adamson; June 11, 1936; Chicago, Illinois, U.S.
- Died: February 22, 2008 (aged 71); Roseburg, Oregon, U.S.
- Occupations: Police officer, screenwriter, television producer, actor
- Years active: 1958–1974 (police officer); 1981–1996 (filmmaker)

Charles Fredrick Adamson (June 11, 1936 – February 22, 2008) was an American police officer, screenwriter, television producer, and actor. He served with the Chicago Police Department as a detective sergeant from 1958 to 1974. He later worked as a technical advisor to filmmaker Michael Mann, and created the television series Crime Story, which Mann produced.

== Biography ==
=== Law enforcement ===
Adamson joined the Chicago Police Department in the late 1950s. He served in the Criminal Intelligence Unit (CIU) as a detective sergeant until 1974. One of his best-known cases, involving a habitual thief named Neil McCauley, was the basis for the 1995 film Heat.

After retiring from law enforcement, he worked for Allstate insurance.

=== Film and television ===
Adamson met Michael Mann in the late 1970s, when the latter was working as a writer on the television series Police Story. Mann hired Adamson as a technical advisor for his feature directorial debut Thief (1981). Adamson helped secure the involvement of several real-life police officers and criminals to appear in the film for added authenticity, including his former partner Dennis Farina, and appeared in the film as a mob henchman. He later worked in a similar capacity on Beverly Hills Cop (1984).

Mann later hired Adamson to write episodes of Miami Vice. Adamson then created the critically-acclaimed television crime drama Crime Story, also produced by Mann, for which he won a People's Choice Award. He advised on Mann's film Heat (1995), based on his 1964 McCauley case.

Additionally, Adamson also made acting appearances in two films for Robert Redford — A River Runs Through It (1992) and Quiz Show (1994) — and in the 1994 miniseries adaptation of Stephen King's The Stand. He was also featured on a 1992 episode of the television documentary Top Cops.

=== Later life and death ===
He lived in Las Vegas for many years, before retiring to Roseburg, Oregon. He wrote a book, The Toughest Cop in America, in 2001.

Adamson died in 2008 from lung cancer at age 71. Michael Mann's 2009 film Public Enemies was dedicated to his memory.

== Filmography ==
=== Film ===
Year	Title	Role	Notes
1981	Thief	Ancell	Also technical advisor
1984	Beverly Hills Cop	Crate Opener	Also technical advisor
1992	A River Runs Through It	Harry	
1994	Quiz Show	Congressman Mack	
1995	Heat	—N/a	Technical advisor

=== Television ===
Year	Title	Role	Notes
1984-86	Miami Vice	—N/a	Writer; 4 episodes
1986-87	Crime Story	Sugarman, Nick Aeillo	Creator; Writer; 19 episodes Exec. story editor; 7 episodes Coordinating producer Actor; 2 episodes
1992	Top Cops	Himself	Episode S3.E8
1994	The Stand	Barry Dorgan	Miniseries
