= Meg Gardiner =

American novelist

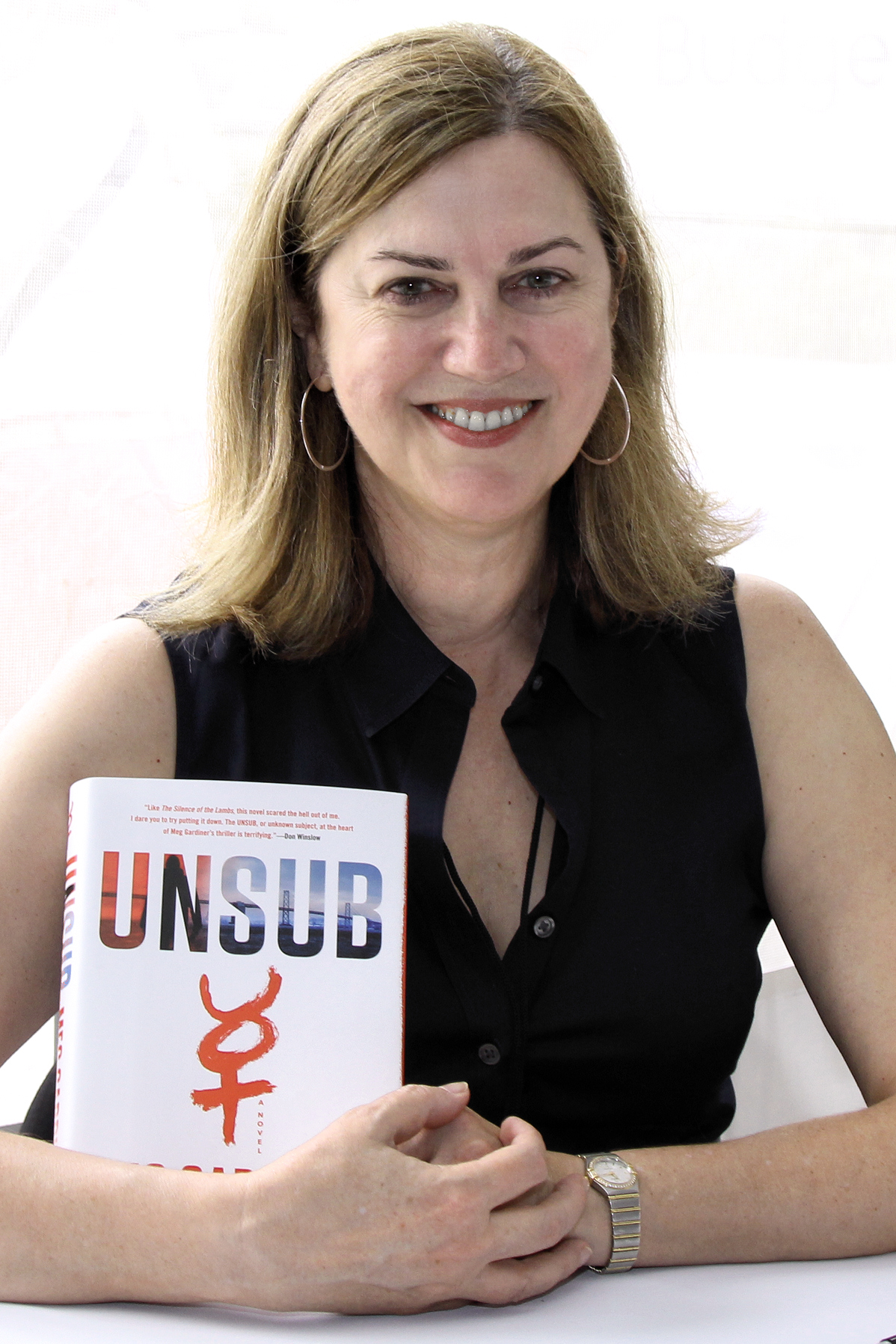
- Gardiner at the 2017 Texas book Festival.
- Born: May 15, 1957 (age 69); Oklahoma, United States
- Education: Stanford University (BA); Stanford Law School (JD)
- Occupation: Novelist
- Writing career
- Period: 2002–present
- Genre: Crime Thriller fiction
- Website: www.meggardiner.com

Meg Gardiner (born May 15, 1957) is an American thriller writer and author of fifteen published books. Her best-known books are the Evan Delaney novels, first published in 2002. In June 2008, she published the first novel in a new series, featuring forensic psychiatrist Jo Beckett. More recently she has published three stand-alone novels—Ransom River (June 2012), The Shadow Tracer (June 2013), and Phantom Instinct (June 2014)—and four novels in a new series: UNSUB (2017), Into the Black Nowhere (2018), The Dark Corners of the Night (2020), and Shadow Heart (2024).

Her first novel, China Lake, received the 2009 Edgar Award for Best Paperback Original novel upon its publication in the United States in 2008. Her first Jo Beckett novel, The Dirty Secrets Club, won the 2009 The Romantic Times Reviewers' Choice award for Best Procedural Novel. Her ninth novel, The Nightmare Thief, won the 2012 Audie Award for Thriller/Suspense Audiobook of the Year.

== Biography ==
Gardiner was born in Oklahoma and grew up in Santa Barbara, California. She currently lives with her husband, Paul Shreve, in Austin, Texas. She has two sons (Mark and Nathaniel) and a daughter (Katherine). Gardiner has said: "I write thrillers.... I used to practice law. I taught writing at the University of California. Of course, there's more – and because the Internet can fact-check you, faster than you can type 'Sarah Palin', I'm going to come clean: It's true that I used to be a mime. But only before mimes became annoying. And yes, I did go in costume to the Star Trek exhibition in Hyde Park. But I did not wear the Ferengi ears.

Gardiner is the daughter of English professor Frank C. Gardiner and Sally (née Love) Gardiner. Meg attended Dos Pueblos High School in Goleta, a community just north of Santa Barbara, graduating in June 1975.

Following graduation, she attended Stanford University, where she attained her Bachelor's degree in Economics and lettered in track. She went on to graduate from Stanford Law School and to practice law in Los Angeles, before returning to Santa Barbara to teach legal research and writing at the University of California, Santa Barbara.

In June 1987, competing as Meg Shreve, she became a 3-time champion on Jeopardy!, winning $29,799 (along with a stay at Beaver Creek Resort in Vail, Colorado, as her prize for coming in second place in her fourth game). Her daughter, Kate Lazo, also became a Jeopardy! champion in 2020.

She lived in Surrey, near London, until 2013, when she moved to Austin.

== Writing career ==
Gardiner signing books at Chaucer's Books in Santa Barbara, 2008

Writing is her "third career ... In earlier incarnations, I practiced law in Los Angeles and taught writing at the University of California, Santa Barbara. After living in California most of my life, in the early 1990s, I moved with my family to the United Kingdom", said Gardiner.

It was during her freedom in those early years in the UK that she wrote her first novel, completing a task she'd set for herself a decade earlier. "I always wanted to write a novel. And it was time to put up or shut up."

Her first novel, China Lake, was published by Hodder & Stoughton in 2002. Since then, Gardiner has written full-time and published eleven additional titles. "It's a job I'm immensely lucky to have."

Gardiner says that she writes crime fiction because it "gets to the heart of the human condition. It's about people facing a severe danger, or confronting an evil that has invaded their world. It's also fun. I get to slingshot readers into situations they would hate to face in real life. A kid in danger? Bring It On. Sadistic killers? Here, have another helping. My book gave you nightmares? Thank you, that's wonderful."

She likes thriller fiction "because it grabs readers, takes them on a menacing ride to places they'd hate to go in real life and returns them safely, feeling thrilled. And especially because crime writing is about morality: finding justice, restoring order out of chaos."

As the daughter of an English professor, "I was obviously in a home where books and reading and writing mattered," Gardiner told the Santa Barbara Independent newspaper. At Dos Pueblos High School in Goleta, California, she reported for the Charger Account, the school paper, but her father urged caution to his budding writer. "He said I could write novels after college and be another novelist who waits on tables or I could become a lawyer who writes novels." She heeded his warning, but later left the law behind and began writing. "I decided I didn't want to argue for a living", she said. Instead, as the title of her blog "Lying for a Living" implies, she now lies for a living.

== Gardiner on writing ==
Gardiner says that she tries, in her writing, "to explore the boundary between morality and wrongdoing. When is it justified to go outside the law to right a wrong? When can you use ruthless violence to defend somebody you love?" She considers no subject to be taboo. "No subject should be off-limits. That road leads to timidity and repression. However, I think certain approaches to subjects are repulsive. Gratuitous, protracted, explicit violence is sometimes offered as a feast, and portrayed with such lurid and eager detail that it becomes almost pornographic. But we should argue about such approaches, not forbid them."

She credits her training as an attorney as part of the foundation for her writing skills. "The intellectual rigor prepared me for a lot of things. The grounding in legal knowledge has been helpful in practice, in teaching, and in being a writer. I learned not to write in legalese. I learned how to tell a story and take a position."

== Gardiner on Evan Delaney ==
Gardiner has described Evan Delaney as a woman who is "spirited, quick-witted, and fights hard for the people she loves . . . She thinks the world is tragic and so you'd better laugh whenever you can. Pour her a glass of Jack Daniel's and ask her about finding that FBI agent hogtied to her bed, stripped and ranting. Just don't get on her bad side, because she may have a heat-seeking missile stashed in her car."

Asked whether the character is autobiographical, Gardiner has said, "Evan is me with the brakes off. She says and does things I would never have the chutzpah to say or do myself. We share a background as lawyers, Californians, and tomboys. And we share a sense of humor, though hers is darker than mine. However, I live a calm life compared to Evan. I've never had to defend myself with a ferret."

== Gardiner on Jo Beckett ==
The lead character in Gardiner's second series, Jo Beckett, MD, is a forensic psychiatrist from San Francisco. Interviewed by Poe's Deadly Daughters, Gardiner explained Beckett's role in this way: "Jo calls herself a deadshrinker. She analyzes the dead for the police. She's the last resort in baffling cases. When the cops and the medical examiner can't determine the manner of a victim's death, they turn to Jo to perform a psychological autopsy and figure out whether it was accident, suicide, or murder."

Gardiner has summarized Beckett's work in this way: "Jo doesn't pick up gory bits of trace evidence with tweezers. She digs into people's passions, obsessions and secrets to find out what killed them. Her territory is the psyche and the human heart."

== Book reviews ==
Both of Gardiner's series and all of her stand-alone novels have received positive reviews. In his Entertainment Weekly column, Stephen King said, "I need to tell you about Meg Gardiner, who simply must be part of the Big Plan. And if you love great thrillers, you'll want to listen." King called the Evan Delaney novels "simply put, the finest crime-suspense series I've come across in the last twenty years."

Kirkus Reviews named The Shadow Tracer one of its Best Mysteries and Thrillers of 2013. About Phantom Instinct, the Associated Press wrote: "'Phantom Instinct' is simply a fantastic story, told at breakneck speed. Gardiner is one of the best thriller writers around, and this is arguably her best work yet...one of this summer's best reads."

== Bibliography ==
To date, Gardiner has written fifteen published novels, including five in the Evan Delaney series, four in the Jo Beckett series, four in the UNSUB series, and three standalone works.

=== Evan Delaney novels ===
1. China Lake (2002)
2. Mission Canyon (2003)
3. Jericho Point (2004)
4. Crosscut (2005)
5. Kill Chain (2006)

=== Jo Beckett novels ===
1. The Dirty Secrets Club (2008)
2. The Memory Collector (June 2009)
3. The Liar's Lullaby (June 2010)
4. The Nightmare Thief (June 2011)

=== Unsub novels ===
1. Unsub (2017)
2. Into the Black Nowhere (2018)
3. The Dark Corners of the Night (2020)
4. Shadow Heart (2024)

=== Other novels ===
- Ransom River (June 2012)
- The Shadow Tracer (June 2013)
- Phantom Instinct (2014) (Published in the UK under the title The Burning Mind (2014), as M.G. Gardiner)
- Heat 2 (2022) (written with Michael Mann)
