= Michael Mann =

American filmmaker (born 1943)

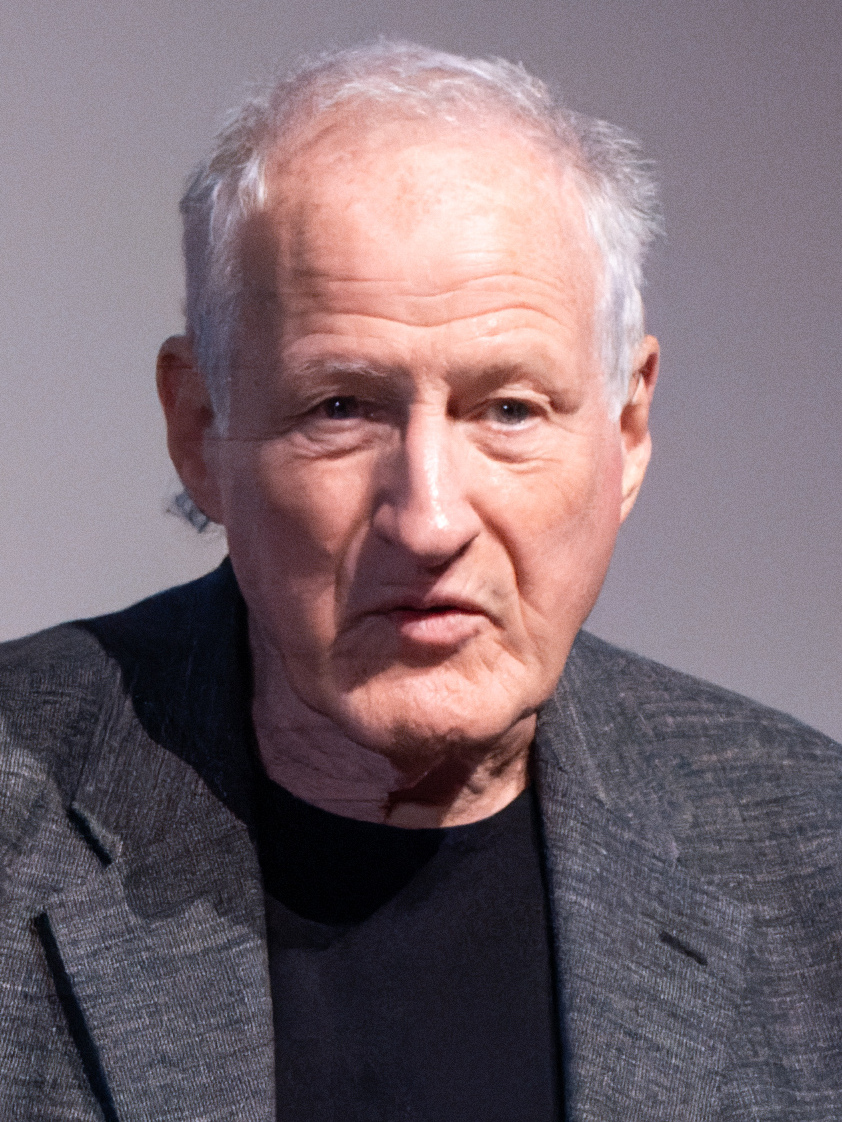
- Mann in 2023
- Born: Michael Kenneth Mann; February 5, 1943 (age 83); Chicago, Illinois, U.S.
- Education: University of Wisconsin (BA); London Film School (MA)
- Occupations: Director; screenwriter; producer; author
- Years active: 1968–present
- Spouse: Summer Mann (m. 1974)
- Children: 4, including Ami Canaan
- Awards: Full list

Michael Kenneth Mann (born February 5, 1943) is an American film director, screenwriter, and producer. Best known for his stylized crime dramas, he has won two Primetime Emmy Awards, as well as earned nominations for four Academy Awards, two Golden Globe Awards, and won a BAFTA Award for producing The Aviator. His most acclaimed works include the films The Jericho Mile (1979), Thief (1981), The Keep (1983), Manhunter (1986), The Last of the Mohicans (1992), Heat (1995), The Insider (1999), Ali (2001), Collateral (2004), Public Enemies (2009), Blackhat (2015), and Ferrari (2023). He was executive producer on the popular TV series Miami Vice (1984–90), which he adapted into a 2006 feature film.

== Early life ==
Mann was born February 5, 1943, in Chicago, Illinois. He is Jewish and the son of Esther and Jack Mann. His grandfather left the Russian Empire in 1912, and brought his wife and Mann's father to the US in 1922.

Mann graduated from Amundsen High School, also the alma mater of Bob Fosse. He then studied English literature at the University of Wisconsin–Madison. While a student, he saw Stanley Kubrick's Dr. Strangelove and fell in love with movies. In an LA Weekly interview, he described the film's impact on him:

It said to my whole generation of filmmakers that you could make an individual statement of high integrity and have that film be successfully seen by a mass audience all at the same time. In other words, you didn't have to be making Seven Brides for Seven Brothers if you wanted to work in the mainstream film industry, or be reduced to niche filmmaking if you wanted to be serious about cinema. So that's what Kubrick meant, aside from the fact that Strangelove was a revelation.

== Career ==
=== 1967–1978: Rise to prominence ===
Mann graduated from the University of Wisconsin with a BA in 1965. He later moved to London in the mid-1960s to go to graduate school in cinema and went on to receive a graduate degree at the London Film School in 1967. He spent seven years in the United Kingdom going to film school and then working on commercials along with contemporaries Alan Parker, Ridley Scott and Adrian Lyne. In 1968, footage he shot of the Paris student revolt for a documentary, Insurrection, aired on NBC's First Tuesday news program and he developed his '68 experiences into the short film Jaunpuri which won the Jury Prize at Cannes in 1970.

Mann returned to the United States after divorcing his first wife in 1971. He went on to direct a road trip documentary, 17 Days Down the Line (1972). Three years later, Hawaii Five-O veteran Robert Lewin gave Mann “a shot and a crash course on television writing and story structure.” This led to Mann writing four episodes for Starsky and Hutch between 1975–1977 (three in the first season and one in the second), two episodes for Bronk in 1976, and an episode for Gibbsville in 1976. Between 1976–1978, he wrote four episodes for Police Story (as well as directed one for the spin-off series Police Woman in 1977) with cop-turned-novelist Joseph Wambaugh. Police Story concentrated on the detailed realism of a real cop's life and taught Mann that first-hand research was essential to bring authenticity to his work.

In 1976–1977, Mann worked on a screenplay originally titled The Last Public Enemy but later re-titled Karpis, based on Canadian-American criminal Alvin Karpis's autobiography, The Alvin Karpis Story. The film was scheduled to be made at Paramount Pictures for producers Harold Hecht and Robert L. Rosen, and was to be directed by John Frankenheimer (who had previously directed a similar film, Birdman of Alcatraz, for Hecht), but it was never produced. Mann also wrote an early draft of the 1978 film Straight Time, which was based on real-life criminal-turned author Edward Bunker's novel No Beast So Fierce. He then created and wrote the pilot episode for Vegas (1978–1981).

=== 1978–1999: Career breakthrough and acclaim ===
Mann's first feature movie was the sports-themed Swan Song starring David Soul for ABC, which was filmed in April 1978. However, it was only broadcast in February 1980, after his second feature, The Jericho Mile, had been released. The Jericho Mile was also made for ABC for television broadcast in the United States but was released theatrically in Europe. The movie was filmed on location at the Folsom State Penitentiary, and won an Emmy for Outstanding Writing in a Limited Series or a Special in 1979 and the Directors Guild of America award for Best Director.

Mann's debut feature in cinema as director was Thief (1981) starring James Caan, a relatively accurate depiction of thieves that operated in New York City and Chicago at that time. Mann used actual former professional burglars to keep the technical scenes as genuine as possible. His next film was The Keep (1983), a supernatural thriller set in Nazi-occupied Romania. Though it was a commercial flop, the film has since attained cult status amongst fans.

His television work in the mid-1980s includes being the executive producer on Miami Vice (1984–1990) and Crime Story (1986–1988). Contrary to popular belief, he was not the creator of these shows, but the executive producer and showrunner, produced by his production company. His production company also produced Paul Michael Glaser's 1986 film Band of the Hand.

In 1986, Mann was the first to bring Thomas Harris' character of serial killer Hannibal Lecter to the screen with Manhunter, his adaptation of the novel Red Dragon, which starred Brian Cox as Hannibal. In an interview on the Manhunter DVD, star William Petersen comments that because Mann is so focused on his creations, it takes several years for him to complete a film; Petersen believes that this is why Mann does not make films very often.

In 1989, he wrote, produced and directed the crime television film L.A. Takedown. He then wrote and produced the three-part miniseries Drug Wars: The Camarena Story (1990), and its 1992 follow-up Drug Wars II: The Cocaine Cartel.

Mann gained widespread recognition in 1992 for his film adaptation of James Fenimore Cooper's novel into the epic historical drama The Last of the Mohicans starring Daniel Day-Lewis. The film is set during the French and Indian War. Film critic Owen Gleiberman of Entertainment Weekly described Mann's directorial style, writing that "Mann, at his best, is a master of violence and lyrical anxiety". Peter Travers of Rolling Stone praised Mann's directing, writing that "the action is richly detailed and thrillingly staged."

This was followed by crime drama Heat (1995) starring Al Pacino, Robert De Niro, and Val Kilmer. The film, a remake of his TV movie L.A. Takedown, was a critical and commercial success. Kenneth Turan of the Los Angeles Times called the film a "sleek, accomplished piece of work, meticulously controlled and completely involving. The dark end of the street doesn't get much more inviting than this." Todd McCarthy of Variety wrote, "Stunningly made and incisively acted by a large and terrific cast, Michael Mann's ambitious study of the relativity of good and evil stands apart from other films of its type by virtue of its extraordinarily rich characterizations and its thoughtful, deeply melancholy take on modern life."

In 1999, Mann filmed The Insider about the 60 Minutes segment about Jeffrey Wigand, a whistleblower in the tobacco industry. Russell Crowe portrayed Wigand, with Pacino playing Lowell Bergman and Christopher Plummer as Mike Wallace. The film showcased Mann's cinematic style and garnered the most critical recognition of his career up to this point. The Insider was nominated for seven Academy Awards as a result, including a nomination for Mann's direction. Critic Roger Ebert of the Chicago Sun-Times praised the film writing, "The Insider had a greater impact on me than All the President's Men, because you know what? Watergate didn't kill my parents. Cigarettes did."

=== 2001–present ===
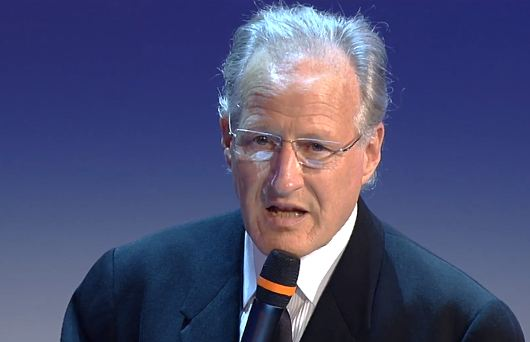
Mann in 2012

With his next film, Ali (2001), starring Will Smith, Mann started experimenting with digital cameras. For his action thriller film Collateral, which was released in 2004, Mann cast Tom Cruise against type by giving him the role of a hitman. Mann shot all of the exterior scenes digitally so that he could achieve more depth and detail during the night scenes while shooting most of the interiors on film stock. Jamie Foxx was nominated for an Academy Award for his performance in Collateral. Also in 2004, he produced Martin Scorsese's The Aviator, based on the life of Howard Hughes, which he had developed with Leonardo DiCaprio. The Aviator was nominated for an Academy Award for Best Picture but lost to Million Dollar Baby. After Collateral, Mann directed the film adaptation of Miami Vice which he also executive produced. The film starred Colin Farrell as Don Johnson's character James "Sonny" Crockett, and Foxx filling Philip Michael Thomas' shoes as Ricardo Tubbs.

Mann directed the 2002 "Lucky Star" advertisement for Mercedes-Benz, which took the form of a film trailer for a purported thriller featuring Benicio del Toro. In the fall of 2007, Mann directed two commercials for Nike. The ad campaign "Leave Nothing" features football action scenes with former NFL players Shawne Merriman and Steven Jackson, as well as using the score "Promontory" from the soundtrack of The Last of the Mohicans. Mann directed the 2008 promotional video for Ferrari's California sports car.

Mann was producer with Peter Berg as director for The Kingdom and Hancock. Hancock stars Smith as a hard-drinking superhero who has fallen out of favor with the public and who begins to have a relationship with the wife (Charlize Theron) of a public relations expert (Jason Bateman), who is helping him to repair his image. Mann makes a cameo appearance in the film as an executive. In 2009, Mann wrote and directed Public Enemies for Universal Pictures, about the Depression-era crime wave, based on Bryan Burrough's nonfiction book, Public Enemies: America's Greatest Crime Wave and the Birth of the FBI, 1933–34. It starred Johnny Depp and Christian Bale. Depp played John Dillinger in the film, and Bale played Melvin Purvis, the FBI agent in charge of capturing Dillinger.

In 2009, Mann signed a petition calling for the release of film director Roman Polanski, who had been arrested in Switzerland in relation to his 1977 charge for drugging and raping a 13-year-old girl.

In January 2010, it was reported by Variety that Mann, alongside David Milch, would serve as co-executive producer of new TV series Luck starring Dustin Hoffman and Dennis Farina. The series was an hour-long HBO production, and Mann directed the series' pilot. Although initially renewed for a second season after the airing of the pilot, it was eventually cancelled due to the death of three horses during production.

In February 2013, it was announced that Mann had been developing an untitled thriller film with screenwriter Morgan Davis Foehl for over a year, for Legendary Pictures. In May 2013, Mann started filming the action thriller, named Blackhat, in Los Angeles, Kuala Lumpur, Hong Kong and Jakarta. The film, starring Chris Hemsworth as a hacker who gets released from prison to pursue a cyberterrorist across the globe, was released in January 2015 by Universal. It received mixed reviews and was a commercial disaster, although several critics included it in their year-end "best-of" lists.

Mann directed the first episode of the 2022 crime series Tokyo Vice for HBO Max, his first directing work since Blackhat. In August the same year, Mann released Heat 2, a novel he had co-written with Meg Gardiner. The book takes place from 1988 to 2000, covering events that happen before and after the 1995 film. The same month, Mann began shooting Ferrari starring Adam Driver and Penélope Cruz in Modena. The film premiered at the 80th Venice International Film Festival and was released in the US in December 2023. Ferrari received generally positive reviews from critics and attained moderate box office success in the United States, while under-performing in overseas box office.

Mann intends for his next film to be Heat 2, which will be distributed by Amazon MGM Studios under the United Artists division. Bruckheimer and Mann will both produce, marking the first time they have worked together since Thief. Leonardo DiCaprio and Christian Bale are reportedly cast in lead roles,. Production is planning to start in December 2026.

== Directorial style ==
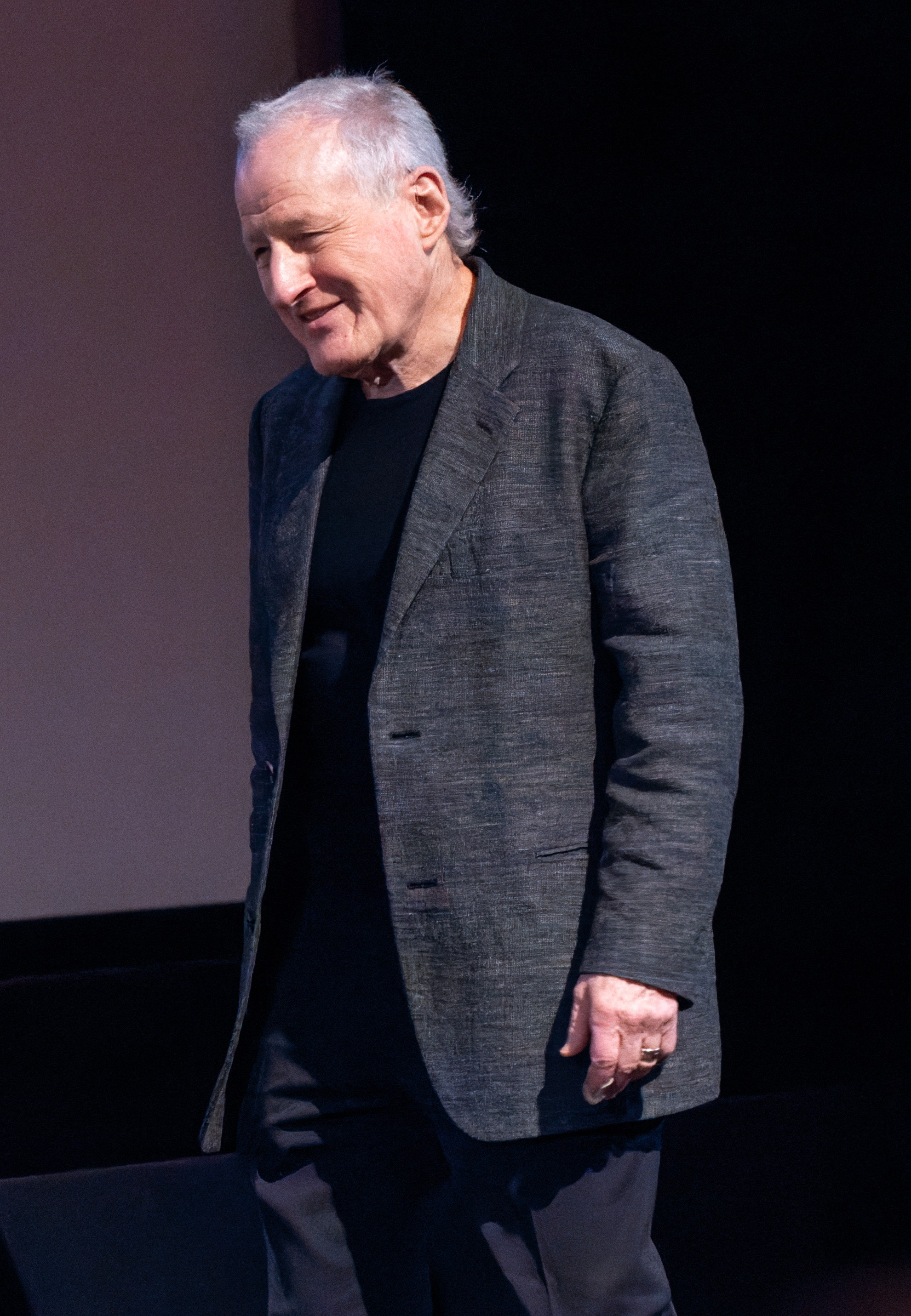
Michael Mann in 2023

Mann's trademarks include powerfully-lit nighttime scenes and unusual scores, such as Tangerine Dream's for Thief and the new-age score to Manhunter.

Dante Spinotti is a frequent cinematographer of Mann's films. F. X. Feeney describes Mann's body of work in DGA Quarterly as "abundantly energetic in its precision and variety" and "psychologically layered".

IndieWire's 2014 retrospective of the director's filmography focused on the intensity of Mann's ongoing interest in "stories pitting criminals against those who seek to put them behind bars (Heat, Public Enemies, Thief, Collateral, Miami Vice). His films frequently suggest that in fact, at the top of their respective games, crooks and cops are not so dissimilar as men: they each live and die by their own codes and they each recognize themselves in the other."

Mann's films have been noted for their realism when it comes to capturing the sounds of gunfire, with him preferring to use raw audio captured from the scene, rather than a sound mix. Many of his films feature practical effects to produce the action scenes, with actors attending boot camps for weapons handling and firing 'full load' blanks in scenes to accurately represent the sound of live ammunition.

== Personal life ==
Mann and his wife, Summer Mann, married in 1974. They have four daughters, including film director and producer Ami Canaan Mann.

On November 1, 2026, it was reported that Mann accidentally shot himself in the leg on the afternoon of October 31, while at a gun range in Los Angeles.

== Filmography ==
Mann has directed 14 feature films.

Directed features
Year	Title	Distributor
1979	The Jericho Mile	ABC Circle Films
1981	Thief	United Artists
1983	The Keep	Paramount Pictures
1986	Manhunter	De Laurentiis Entertainment Group
1989	L.A. Takedown	NBC
1992	The Last of the Mohicans	20th Century Fox / Morgan Creek International
1995	Heat	Warner Bros.
1999	The Insider	Buena Vista Pictures (Touchstone Pictures) / Spyglass Entertainment
2001	Ali	Sony Pictures Releasing (Columbia Pictures) / Initial Entertainment Group
2004	Collateral	DreamWorks Pictures / Paramount Pictures
2006	Miami Vice	Universal Pictures
2009	Public Enemies	Universal Pictures
2015	Blackhat	Universal Pictures
2023	Ferrari	STX Entertainment / Neon
TBD	Heat 2	United Artists / Amazon MGM Studios

== Awards and nominations ==
For his work, he has received nominations from international organizations and juries, including the British Academy of Film and Television Arts, Cannes, and the Academy of Motion Picture Arts and Sciences. As a producer, Mann has twice received nominations for the Academy Award for Best Picture, first for The Insider and then The Aviator (2004), which Mann had been hired to direct before the project was transferred to Martin Scorsese.

Total Film ranked Mann No. 28 on its 2007 list of the 100 Greatest Directors Ever, and Sight and Sound ranked him No. 5 on their list of the 10 Best Directors of the Last 25 Years (for the years 1977–2002).

Year	Title	Academy Awards		BAFTA Awards		Golden Globe Awards	
Year	Title	Nominations	Wins	Nominations	Wins	Nominations	Wins
1992	The Last of the Mohicans	1	1	7	2	1	
1999	The Insider	7		1		5	
2001	Ali	2		2	1	3	
2004	Collateral	2		5	1	1	
2023	Ferrari			1			
Total		12	1	16	4	10	0

Directed Academy Award performances

Under Mann's direction, these actors have received Academy Award nominations for their performances in their respective roles.

Year	Performer	Film	Result
Academy Award for Best Actor
2000	Russell Crowe	The Insider	Nominated
2002	Will Smith	Ali	Nominated
Academy Award for Best Supporting Actor
2002	Jon Voight	Ali	Nominated
2005	Jamie Foxx	Collateral	Nominated

== Bibliography ==
- Wildermuth, Mark E. (2005). Blood in the Moonlight: Michael Mann and Information Age Cinema (paperback ed.). Jefferson, North Carolina: McFarland Company and Inc. ISBN 9780786420599.
- F. X. Feeney, Paul Duncan (2006). Michael Mann (hardcover ed.) Taschen. ISBN 9783822831410.
- Cadieux, Axel (2015). L'Horizon de Michael Mann. Playlist Society.
- Jean-Baptiste Thoret (2021). Michael Mann. Mirages du contemporain. Flammarion.
  - "Mirages du contemporain : Michael Mann dans le regard de Jean-Baptiste Thoret". France Culture. September 18, 2021.
- Mann, Michael and Gardiner, Meg (2022). Heat 2 (hardcover ed.) HarperCollins. ISBN 9780062653314.
