= Crime Story (American TV series) =

American crime drama television series

- Anthony Denison (left, as Ray Luca) and Dennis Farina (as Lt. Mike Torello)
- Genre: Crime drama Historical drama
- Created by: Chuck Adamson; Gustave Reininger
- Starring: Dennis Farina; Anthony Denison; Stephen Lang; Bill Smitrovich; Bill Campbell; Steve Ryan; Paul Butler; Ted Levine
- Theme music composer: Del Shannon; Max Crook
- Opening theme: "Runaway"
- Country of origin: United States
- Original language: English
- No. of seasons: 2
- No. of episodes: 44

Production
- Executive producer: Michael Mann
- Producer: Stuart Cohen; Gail Morgan Hickman; Michael Jaffe; Peter R. McIntosh; Ervin Zavada
- Running time: 44–49 minutes
- Production companies: Michael Mann Productions; New World Television

Original release
- Network: NBC
- Release: September 18, 1986 – May 10, 1988

Crime Story is an American crime drama television series, created by Chuck Adamson and Gustave Reininger and executive produced by Michael Mann, that aired on NBC, where it ran for two seasons from September 18, 1986, to May 10, 1988.

Set in the early 1960s, the series depicted two men—Lt. Mike Torello (Dennis Farina) and mobster Ray Luca (Anthony Denison)—with an obsessive drive to destroy each other. As Luca started with street crime in Chicago, was "made" in the Chicago Outfit and then sent to Las Vegas to monitor their casinos, Torello pursued Luca as head of a special Organized Crime Strike Force. Torello, his friend Ted Kehoe, and Luca had grown up in Chicago's "The Patch" (Smith Park) neighborhood, also called "Little Italy" or "Little Sicily" and the haunt of the Forty-Two Gang.

The show premiered with a two-hour pilot—a film which had been exhibited theatrically—and was watched by over 30 million viewers. NBC scheduled the show to Tuesdays at 9 p.m. opposite ABC's Moonlighting on its fall schedule but moved it to Fridays at 10 p.m. in December. It moved to Tuesdays at 10 p.m. in fall 1987 before being cancelled after two seasons.

Crime Story attracted both acclaim and controversy for its serialized format, in which a continuing storyline was told over an entire season, rather than being episodic, as was the case with most shows at the time.

== Plot ==
=== Season 1 ===
The first season follows Chicago Police Detective Lieutenant Mike Torello and his pursuit of organized crime from Chicago to Las Vegas, circa 1963–64. At the beginning of the series Torello is the head of the Major Crimes Unit (MCU), a squad of hard-boiled cops that includes Detective Sgt. Danny Krychek of the local Chicago Polonia, Det. Walter Clemmons, Det. Nate Grossman and Det. Joey Indelli.

At the center of Torello's crosshairs is rising young Italian-American mobster Ray Luca. Initially Luca is an independent thief and killer whose crew, which includes Italian-American gangster Pauli Taglia and Jewish-American gangster Frank Holman, specializes in robberies, burglaries, and home invasions. Through his connection to Chicago crime boss Phil Bartoli, a boss or capo within the Italian-American Chicago Outfit, Luca catches the attention of not only the local Italian-American Mafia but also national crime figure Manny Weisbord, the head of a Jewish Mob organization and a character inspired by the legendary gangster Meyer Lansky. Luca impresses Weisbord with his desire to leave the streets and move up in the management ranks of organized crime. Weisbord assigns one of his men, Max Goldman, to be a middleman between himself and Luca.

Luca tells Weisbord and Bartoli of his plan to take over the Las Vegas bookmaking operation of Noah Ganz. He is told to negotiate a deal, but instead instigates the theft of Ganz's gambling book. However, this backfires when Torello gets wind of it and catches Frank Holman in the act, which results in the book falling into the hands of MCU. When a crime war threatens to break out with Ganz's organization, Weisbord and Bartoli order Luca to clean up his mess. In typical fashion Luca solves the problem by massacring Ganz and his thugs.

Torello finally manages to get a solid murder indictment against Luca. Meanwhile, Holman, who escaped custody only to be hunted down again, has made a deal with U.S. federal prosecutor Harry Breitel to provide information about the mob in exchange for immunity. Among his lies is a made-up story that he paid off Chicago cop Mike Torello. The murders of Ted Kehoe, a childhood friend of Torello with ties to the organization, and his associate Marilyn Stewart convince Breitel to take Luca, Taglia and Bartoli to trial. Torello finds himself being investigated by Breitel and the feds for corruption, based primarily on the testimony of Holman.

At a bar Luca casually asks strait-laced public defender David Abrams, whose father once had mob connections, for advice. That advice leads Luca to subpoena Torello to testify for the defense at his trial. Abrams is furious when he discovers the result of his conversation with Luca, who has also tried to convince Abrams to work for him. When Luca learns that Abrams is applying for a job as a Justice Department attorney, he worries that Abrams will now come after him. He orders Abrams killed—but by mistake the car bomb intended for the lawyer kills Abrams's father instead.

Manny Weisbord, in the meantime, is planning to relocate the majority of his organization to Las Vegas, with interest in having a legitimate business to launder money and provide future profits. To this end, he has called upon the services of casino board member Steve Kordo, who is looking to sell his plans to the highest bidder. Phil Bartoli, along with some of the other Organization members, express disinterest, as they are more concerned with immediate profits than the future. Weisbord sends Ray Luca to Las Vegas with the assignment of taking over the casinos. Luca takes along his dim-witted but brutally violent sidekick Taglia to be his muscle. First, though, he murders Bartoli and all those opposed to the relocation.

With Abrams' help, Torello nullifies Holman's credibility as a witness. The corruption investigation against Torello is dropped and Breitel is taken off of the case. Unfortunately, the case Torello has built against Luca has been destroyed by Breitel's interference. Justice Dept. Assistant Attorney Gen. Patrick Hallahan offers Torello the chance to head up a new federal Organized Crime Strike Force to root out mob activities in Las Vegas. To assist him on the legalities side he will be aided by David Abrams, now a Justice Dept. attorney. The members of his MCU staff, Indelli, Clemons, Krychek, and Grossman, were reassigned to work with him in the Federal Strike Force, based upon, among other things, the fact that they had "the finest arrest/conviction record on the Chicago police force."

In Vegas, Ray Luca sets about a takeover of the casinos in his usual violent, thuggish manner, which includes the murder of the resort-workers union leader and a federal agent planted by the Strike Force. When Frank Holman resurfaces, Luca makes him sorry for bringing him to trial, before hiring him on again as a casino manager. Luca soon becomes so drunk with his own sense of power and invincibility that he alienates those around him. Steve Kordo in particular is worried, as Luca's actions are veering away from the legitimate plans he had and strengthening the Strike Force's case; despite the massive profits from the business, Luca continues to use dishonest methods, simply because he can.

Torello and Abrams finally get enough proof of skimmed profits and rigged games to rescind Luca's gaming license and bar him from entering any and all casinos. Infuriated, he impulsively goes after Goldman, whose wife he had been sleeping with (among other women); he then sends Holman to try and kill Goldman with a car bomb, but Goldman survives. When Luca (still seething from being banned from his own casino) brutally rapes Pauli Taglia's girlfriend, a distraught Taglia turns against his boss and implicates Luca in the union leader's killing to Torello's Strike Force, just as Luca gets the ban on his license lifted. Luca goes on trial for multiple murders, but cleverly orchestrates a mistrial by having Holman tamper with the jury and making sure the judge learns of it. Luca is then released on bail pending a new trial. He apologizes to Pauli, who forgives him out of loyalty, though it is an agonizing decision since it means abandoning the one person who was genuinely decent towards him.

Luca tries to force casino owner Nat Martino to sell out his interest, but Martino's refusal threatens a mob war. Weisbord orders Luca to make peace, but instead the hot-headed Luca murders Martino. Torello and his men had set up the killing as a (somewhat) failed trap, and a gunfight ensues. Luca flees through the streets of Vegas, he and Torello shooting each other several times, before being rescued by Pauli. The wounded Luca wakes up in an isolated desert shack thinking he is safe, only to discover that Taglia has brought them to a restricted government nuclear test area. The season ends with an A-bomb being exploded on site, presumably obliterating Luca and Taglia as they attempt to escape.

=== Season 2 ===
In the second season, Torello and his cops are shocked when Ray Luca and Pauli Taglia reappear in Las Vegas alive and well... and even more shocked to learn that the U.S. government has made a secret deal with Luca and given him immunity in exchange for his cooperation. Assistant Attorney General Hallahan tells Torello that elements within the government have made a marriage of convenience for their own political agenda. If they continue their pursuit of Luca, they will be operating without official sanction.

Despite Luca's outward appearance of propriety, Torello is convinced the gangster chieftain is anything but. When the Strike Force puts him under surveillance, Luca goes to court to get a restraining order. David Abrams argues that Luca's history of violence justifies the surveillance, but his personal vendetta against Luca for his father's death becomes obvious, and the judge grants the injunction.

Torello and his men aren't the only ones angered by Luca's return to Las Vegas. His abrupt reappearance doesn't sit well with Max Goldman and Steve Kordo. In Luca's absence they now run the mob's Vegas casino interests, and despite Luca's assurances that he has no intention of pushing them out, they feel threatened. Publicly they welcome him back with open arms, but privately they begin to plot against him. Kordo tries to hire a hitman to kill Luca, but is instead warned that the Outfit wants Luca alive because he is too valuable to its operations.

Abrams is so embittered by the failure of the system he believes in that he resigns from the Justice Dept. Though he says he is leaving Las Vegas, Torello discovers he actually intends to kill Luca. Torello and Krychek rush to Luca's house just in time to prevent the killing. Luca thanks Torello, who says he did it for Abrams.

Abrams descends into a haze of alcohol and drugs. Luca finds him strung out on peyote and lies that it was Chicago crime boss Phil Bartoli who ordered the hit that accidentally killed Abrams's father. He tells Abrams he was born to be part of the Outfit and offers him a job as his personal lawyer if he ever decides to clean himself up. Soon after, to the Strike Force's disbelief, Abrams shows up at Luca's door and takes the job.

When Manny Weisbord is stricken by a heart attack and lies near death, Luca flies an internationally known South African surgeon to Las Vegas to secretly perform the first heart transplant—with a heart from a murder victim supplied by Taglia. With Weisbord lying near death, Goldman and Kordo meet to discuss their uncertain future. Concerned Luca will take them both out if the old man dies, Goldman argues for killing Luca preemptively and insists Kordo is the only one who can get close enough to do it.

What they don't know is that Torello's men have them wired and overhear their plot. Torello tells Goldman that Weisbord is now expected to live, which means any hit on Luca is a death wish. Goldman races to Luca's penthouse and throws Kordo out a window to his death as he is about to shoot Luca. Afterwards, Torello makes it clear that he now expects Goldman to be his snitch.

The murder of a reporter writing a story about Luca leads the Strike Force to discover the truth about Luca's secret activities. Luca has made a deal with the U.S. military to smuggle weapons out of the country to revolutionary causes the government secretly supports. In exchange, the military turns a blind eye to the fact that Luca is smuggling narcotics into the U.S. from Mexico and Asia.

With this evidence, Hallahan convinces Congress to convene hearings to investigate the unholy alliance between the U.S. government and organized crime. But just as Luca is testifying, the hearings are adjourned because of a national emergency: North Vietnam has attacked a U.S. warship in the Gulf of Tonkin. Hallahan gets a warrant for Luca's arrest anyway, but Luca flees the country with Taglia and Goldman before it can be served, headed for Latin America. Hallahan gives Torello's Strike Force his blessing to pursue Luca onto foreign soil, but warns that outside the U.S. their badges will mean nothing.

In a small banana republic, Luca sets up a new base of operations for his international criminal empire, buying off politicians, military and police with the mob's money. Unable to have Luca extradited, the Strike Force attacks Luca's drug lab in the jungle. Furious at Torello's interference once again, Luca orders the president to have him arrested. The president refuses—and Luca promptly shoots him dead and installs a new president better to his liking. Later, however, the local army executes a coup and their ranking colonel appoints himself leader; while not receptive to Luca's influence, he tolerates him for the money he brings to the republic.

In a confrontation between the Strike Force and the local police, Krychek is captured and thrown into a hellhole of a prison. Torello and the others stage a rescue. Luca decides to rid himself of this thorn in his side once and for all, and orders Torello killed.

In the dead of night Torello meets with his secret source inside Luca's organization: it is David Abrams, whose sellout to Luca has all been an act. Abrams warns Torello about the planned hit and also reveals the location of a major drug shipment. When the Strike Force captures the narcotics, Luca concludes that Abrams is an informant. He offers to trade Abrams to Torello for the shipment. The trade is made—but Torello's men have planted explosives on the drugs, and the shipment is blown up.

An assassin attempts to kill Torello, but Abrams is badly wounded instead. While Clemmons and Indelli race Abrams to a doctor, Torello and the others pursue Luca to an airfield, where he, Taglia and Goldman are about to leave the country. Torello and Krychek manage to board the plane as it is taking off. In the ensuing airborne fight, Taglia shoots the pilot, causing the plane to plummet toward the ocean below. Torello and Luca continue to wrestle as do Krychek and Goldman, while Taglia, in an attempt to fly the plane, accidentally takes out the yoke. The final shot is an explosion of waves caused by the plane's impact, with the fate of the cops and criminals unknown.

== Cast ==
- Dennis Farina as Lt. Mike Torello
- Anthony Denison as Ray Luca
- John Santucci as Pauli Taglia
- Stephen Lang as David Abrams
- Bill Smitrovich as Sgt. Danny Krychek, Torello's second in-command
- Bill Campbell as Det. Joey Indelli
- Paul Butler as Det. Walter Clemmons
- Steve Ryan as Det. Nate Grossman
- Ted Levine as Frank Holman
- Andrew Clay as Max Goldman
- Jon Polito as Phil Bartoli
- Joseph Wiseman as Manny Weisbord
- Darlanne Fluegel as Julie Torello (1986–87)
- Jay O. Sanders as Steven Kordo

=== Notable guest appearances ===
Like Miami Vice, Crime Story featured heavy use of up-and-coming actors; a number of them made appearances in both shows. Lead actors Dennis Farina, Bill Smitrovich, and John Santucci all appeared in multiple episodes of Miami Vice (though only Farina played a recurring character).

- David Caruso appeared as Johnny O'Donnel, a friend of Ray Luca, in the pilot (episodes 1 and 2). He appeared in flashback scenes in episode 12, and in episode 19 of the second season.
- Julia Roberts appeared as a juvenile rape victim in the Season 1 episode "The Survivor". It was her first TV appearance.
- Kevin Spacey appeared in second-season premiere as a crusading, Kennedy-esque Senator. This was his first major television appearance.
- Deborah Harry appeared in the penultimate episode of season 1, "Top of the World", as one of the girlfriends of Ray Luca. She did not sing.
- Paul Anka appeared in the penultimate episode of season 1, "Top of the World", as Anthony 'Tony' Dio. He did not sing in character, although his 1959 recording "Put Your Head On My Shoulder" in heard as incidental music during the episode.
- Gary Sinise appeared in the season 1 episode "For Love or Money" as Howie Dressler, a husband forced to steal to pay for his wife's iron lung. He also directed two episodes, credited as "Gary A. Sinise".
- Ving Rhames appeared in the season 1 episode "Abrams For The Defense" as Hector Lincoln, a husband and father accused of assaulting his landlord. This was Rhames's second television appearance.
- William Russ was occasionally featured during the opening credits of Season 1's first half, even though his character (an MCU detective) was murdered in the pilot.
- Christian Slater played a teenager who discovered a body in the episode "Old Friends, Dead Ends".
- Paul Guilfoyle appeared in "Hide and Go Thief" as a crazed robber who gets into a hostage standoff with MCU. His hostage was played by Lorraine Bracco. Bracco's sister Elizabeth played a sandwich shop waitress in the pilot.
- Michael Rooker appeared as a uniformed police officer in the pilot's opening.
- Lili Taylor played a waitress in Frank Holman's Diner in the episode "Hide and Go Thief".
- Richard Edson played a thief and Outfit associate in the episode "For Love or Money".
- Pam Grier played Suzanne Terry, an investigative journalist and girlfriend of federal attorney David Abrams, in five episodes spread out over both seasons.
- Jazz musician Miles Davis made a cameo in the first-season episode "The War," playing jazz with Stephen Lang.
- Jazz musician Dexter Gordon appeared in the second-season episode "Moulin Rouge".
- Stanley Tucci played bomber Zack Lowman in "The Battle of Las Vegas".
- Lee Ving and Anthony Heald appeared as opposing candidates for leader of a Las Vegas labor union on strike in "The Battle of Las Vegas".
- Bruce McGill played film producer Nathan Hill in episode "Love Hurts".
- David Hyde Pierce appears in the second-season episode "MiG 21," as NSA Agent Carruthers (billed as David Pierce). That episode also featured George Dzundza, who would have later success on Law & Order.
- Season Two episode "Protected Witness" featured both Laura San Giacomo as Theresa Farantino, and Billy Zane as Frankie "The Duke" Farantino.
- Michael J. Pollard played pimp Leon Barski, and William Hickey played Judge Neville Harmon in "The Brothel Wars".
- Elias Koteas played a ranch hand in the Season two episode "Roadrunner".
- Dennis Haysbert appeared in "Moulin Rogue" and "Seize the Time" as the bookkeeper of a jazz club.
- Mark Margolis appeared in "Robbery, Armed" as a kidnapper and armed robber.
- Among others, Eric Bogosian played the Outfit's attorney Dee Morton, Michael Madsen played Outfit associate Johnny Fossi, and Vincent Gallo, Armin Shimerman, and Jim True-Frost were Outfit figures.
- David Soul played a doctor who married Mike Torello's ex-wife Julie in the second-season episode "Blast from the Past", which also featured James Remar. Soul later directed two second-season episodes, "Moulin Rouge" and "Love Hurts".
- Michael Jeter played Senator Michael Gaspari in the second-season episode "The Hearings". Jeter later played "Eduard Delacroix" in the movie "The Green Mile" which he was nominated for a Screen Actors Guild Award in 2000.
- Steven Weber played a pornographer in Season Two episode 7 "Little Girl Lost".
- Amy Morton played Brenda Mahoney, the wife of a murder victim who later finds comfort with David Abrams in the Season One episodes "The Battle of Las Vegas" and "The Survivor".
- Fred Savage played Ray Luca's son in Season 1 episode "Crime Pays".

== Production ==
After the success of the first season of Miami Vice, television producer Michael Mann had complete freedom from NBC to produce another show. Originally, Universal Pictures was going to finance Crime Story but decided against it because of the projected costs (Miami Vice, a Universal show, was already being produced for higher than the average $1 million per episode rate). New World Pictures agreed to finance the show, with a chance to sell it overseas while Universal retained the domestic syndication rights.

According to Mann, the genesis of the project was to follow a group of police officers in a major crimes unit in 1963 and how they change over 20 hours of television, "in 1980, with very different occupations, in a different city and in a different time". He was influenced by the television series Police Story, and based Crime Story largely on the experiences of Chuck Adamson, a former Chicago police detective of 17 years. Mann asked Adamson and Gustave Reininger to write the series pilot and a show bible. Reininger was a former Wall Street international investment banker who had come to Mann's attention based on a screenplay he had written about arson investigators, and a French film that he had written and produced. Reininger researched Crime Story by winning the confidence of Detective William Hanhardt, who put him in touch with undercover officers in Chicago. They sent him on meetings with organized crime figures. Reininger risked wearing a body microphone and recorder. After visiting the crime scene of the gangland slaying of bookmaker Al Brown, Reininger backed off his Mob interviews. Adamson claimed that the stories depicted in the series were composites rather than actual events that happened, "but they'll be accurate".

In a June 1986 press conference, Mann said that the first season of the show would go from Chicago in 1963 to Las Vegas in 1980. He said, "It's a serial in the sense that we have continuing stories, and in that sense the show is one big novel". Mann and Reininger's inspiration for the 1963–1980 arc came from their mutual admiration of the epic 15+ hour film, Berlin Alexanderplatz, by German director Rainer Werner Fassbinder. Mann said, "The pace of our story is like the speed of light compared to that, but that's the idea—if you put it all together at the end you've got one hell of a 22-hour movie". Mann predicted a five-year network run for the show. However, due to budgetary constraints, the need for four sets of period cars proved to be too expensive. Tartikoff eventually allowed their series to move to Las Vegas for the last quarter of the 22 episodes. Ultimately, the show encompasses only the years 1963–64.

NBC head Brandon Tartikoff (who had started his career in Chicago) gave an order for a two-hour movie, which had a theatrical release in a handful of U.S. theaters to invited guests only. Tartikoff also ordered 22 episodes which allowed Reininger and Adamson to tell a story with developing character arcs, and continuing stories (instead of episodic, self standing shows). Two episodes were made every three weeks, with shooting taking up more than 12 hours in a day, seven days a week. By the second season, an average episode cost between $1.3 and 1.4 million (roughly the same as Miami Vice) because it was shot on location, set during the 1960s (requiring period-accurate props and costumes), and featured a large cast.

Hilda Stark worked as an art director on the pilot episode and was asked back by Mann after seven episodes to become the show's production designer. To achieve the period look of the show, she and her design team would go to second-hand and antique stores, run advertisements in newspapers seeking articles from the period, and sometimes build furniture if they could not find it. According to Stark, the overall design or look of the show featured "a lot of exaggerated lines. We go for high style—sleek lines... We go for the exaggerated shapes that recall the era". Stark and her team also came up with a color scheme for the show that featured "saturated color, and certain combinations—black, fuchsias—reminiscent of the '50s". She found inspiration in a library of old books and magazines, in particular Life. For the vintage cars in the show, they bought or rented from private owners.

The theme song is "Runaway" by Del Shannon. "Runaway" was a 1961 hit for Shannon, who re-recorded it with altered lyrics after Michael Mann had asked to use the song for the show.

== Episodes ==
=== Series overview ===
Season	Episodes	Originally released		Rank	Rating
Season	Episodes	First released	Last released	Rank	Rating
1	22	September 18, 1986	March 13, 1987	42	13.1
2	22	September 22, 1987	May 10, 1988	48	12.1

=== Season 1 (1986–87) ===
No. overall	No. in season	Title	Directed by	Written by	Original release date	U.S. viewers (millions)	Rating/Share
1	1	"Pilot"	Abel Ferrara	Story by : Chuck Adamson & Gustave Reininger; Teleplay by : Chuck Adamson & David J. Burke & Gustave Reininger	September 18, 1986	N/A	20.1/32
Chicago Major Crime Unit, led by no-nonsense Lt. Torrello, stops a team of robbers, but the leader escapes. Torrello suspects Ray Luca, a mobster on the rise. He also deals with idealistic public defender Abrams, who opposes his methods.
2	2	"Pilot"	Abel Ferrara	Story by : Chuck Adamson & Gustave Reininger; Teleplay by : Chuck Adamson & David J. Burke & Gustave Reininger	September 18, 1986	N/A	20.1/32
Chicago Major Crime Unit, led by no-nonsense Lt. Torrello, stops a team of robbers, but the leader escapes. Torrello suspects Ray Luca, a mobster on the rise. He also deals with idealistic public defender Abrams, who opposes his methods.
3	3	"Final Transmission"	Leon Ichaso	S : Chuck Adamson & Gustave Reininger; T : Richard Christian Danus	September 19, 1986	N/A	17.0/32
A psycho killer becomes the MCU's top priority case. Luca uses the manpower shift to his advantage by pulling off major heists.
4	4	"Shadow Dancer"	Leon Ichaso	Story by : Chuck Adamson & Gustave Reininger; Teleplay by : Richard Christian Danus	September 26, 1986	N/A	13.3/23
Lt. Torello and the MCU search for the person responsible for the murder committed during a home invasion. Feeling the heat from the MCU's home invasion investigation Phil Bartoli orders Ray Luca to take care of the problem personally.
5	5	"The St. Louis Book of Blues"	Leon Ichaso	Story by : Chuck Adamson & Gustave Reininger; Teleplay by : Tony Castro & Carlton Cuse	September 30, 1986	N/A	10.6/16
Luca plans to take over the gambling business and sends one of his men, Holman, to St. Louis. Torello plans to take Holman down, but the local sheriff, who wants publicity gets in MCU's way.
6	6	"The War"	Leon Ichaso	Story by : Chuck Adamson & Gustave Reininger and David J. Burke; Teleplay by : Chuck Adamson and Tony Castro & Carlton Cuse	October 7, 1986	N/A	11.5/17
Luca's takeover of the gambling business comes to a halt and Torello hits his other operations even harder. However, Torello suffers a major loss in his private life.
7	7	"Abrams for the Defense"	Aaron Lipstadt	Story by : Michael Mann; Teleplay by : David J. Burke & Kenneth Michael Edwards	October 14, 1986	N/A	14.3/21
A pretty female reporter helps public defender Abrams defend a man accused of assaulting a slumlord and he falls for her. Torello, on the other hand, must help his wife get through the tough times.
8	8	"Pursuit of a Wanted Felon"	Aaron Lipstadt	Story by : Chuck Adamson & Gustave Reininger and Michael Mann; Teleplay by : Eric Blakeney & Gene Miller	October 28, 1986	N/A	11.6/18
Abrams pursues a relationship with Suzanne Terry, the reporter who helped him, but he's condemned by most because she's African-American. Torello and his wife have a rocky vacation. FBI finally locates Holman.
9	9	"Old Friends, Dead Ends"	Bobby Roth	Story by : Chuck Adamson & Gustave Reininger; Teleplay by : Loraine Despres and Chuck Adamson & David J. Burke	November 4, 1986	N/A	12.2/18
Shocked Torello discovers that his old friend is working with the mob. A federal investigator, who's about to indict Luca, suspects Torello is dirty. Luca tries to stop the indictment.
10	10	"Justice Hits the Skids"	Mario DiLeo	Story by : Chuck Adamson & Michael Mann; Teleplay by : Clifton Campbell	November 11, 1986	N/A	9.5/14
Angered by the death of his friend, Torello decides to ignore the FBI and goes after Holman himself. Luca goes into fencing business. Abram's girlfriend Suzanne is attacked while investigating street drug dealers for her new piece.
11	11	"For Love or Money"	Bobby Roth	Story by : Chuck Adamson & Gustave Reininger; Teleplay by : Chuck Adamson & David J. Burke	December 5, 1986	N/A	14.3/25
As his marriage disintegrates, Torrello starts a relationship with lovely Inger Thorson, assistant of one of the jewelers Luca's crew murdered. MCU stops a new crew of robbers. Luca makes a deadly move against independent fences.
12	12	"Crime Pays"	Mario DiLeo & Abel Ferrara and Leon Ichaso & Bobby Roth	Story by : Chuck Adamson & Gustave Reininger; Teleplay by : David J. Burke	December 5, 1986	/	
A clip show recapping the story thus far. All major plot events and character development moments are covered and some previously cut scenes shown for the first time.
13	13	"Hide and Go Thief"	Francis Delia	S : Chuck Adamson & Gustave Reininger; T : Clifton Campbell	December 12, 1986	N/A	14.0/24
MCU faces an armed robbery that turns into a hostage situation. Holman is caught, but overly ambitious Federal prosecutor Harry Breitel asks him to testify against Luca's crew as well as Torello's team.
14	14	"Strange Bedfellows"	Francis Delia	Story by : Chuck Adamson & Gustave Reininger; Teleplay by : David J. Burke	December 26, 1986	N/A	14.8/29
Luca gets indicted and Torello is next, so his boss orders him to take a vacation. Luca tries to find someone to take out Holman in jail, before he testifies. He also asks naive Abrams for legal advice without disclosing the details.
15	15	"Fatal Crossroads"	Gary Sinise	S : Gustave Reininger & Michael Mann; T : Clifton Campbell; S/T : Chuck Adamson	January 9, 1987	N/A	13.6/22
Mike is indicted and used by Luca to destroy Holman's testimony. However, Abrams, feeling guilty for being foolish, helps Mike. Mike breaks up with Inger to protect her from scandal. The Dancer, an ex fence and Abrams' dad, shows up.
16	16	"Torello on Trial"	Gary Sinise	S : Chuck Adamson & Gustave Reininger; T : Robert Eisele	January 16, 1987	N/A	14.8/25
Torello testifies in court to prove his innocence, but emotions in the courtroom heat up quickly. Local boss Dominic Tranchita breaks the mob's golden rule and starts dealing drugs. He even clashes with the mob council over the issue.
17	17	"The Kingdom of Money"	James A. Conter	Story by : Robert Eisele & Michael Mann; Teleplay by : David J. Burke	January 30, 1987	N/A	14.5/25
The mob makes its move to take over Las Vegas casinos. Abrams and Torello gather a team and set up an undercover operation in the strip club that Luca's men frequently visit.
18	18	"The Battle of Las Vegas"	Aaron Lipstadt	S : Chuck Adamson & Gustave Reininger; T : Eric Blakeney	February 6, 1987	N/A	12.9/22
A general strike hits Las Vegas casinos. Luca decides to get the strike leaders on his side one way or the other. Meanwhile, Torello's team must track down a gang that bombing and setting fires to both casinos and the picket lines.
19	19	"The Survivor"	Alan Myerson	Story by : Chuck Adamson & Gustave Reininger; Teleplay by : David J. Burke & Chuck Adamson	February 13, 1987	N/A	13.9/25
Torrello falls for Lisa, ex-wife of Abrams's assistant, Steve Altman, but Altman is psychotic and possessive and tries to get Lisa and her daughter Tracy back by any means necessary. Also, FBI undercover agent infiltrates Luca's casino.
20	20	"The Pinnacle"	John Nicolella	Story by : Chuck Adamson & Gustave Reininger and Robert Eisele; Teleplay by : Robert Eisele	February 27, 1987	N/A	13.9/23
Luca forces the owner of Palladium, the biggest Las Vegas casino still not controlled by the mob, to give in. Meanwhile, Jack Claymore, the undercover FBI agent who's infiltrated Luca's casino meets Torello and becomes compromised.
21	21	"Top of the World"	Michael Mann	Story by : Chuck Adamson & Gustave Reininger and Peter Lance; Teleplay by : Peter Lance & Frederick Rappaport	March 6, 1987	N/A	13.4/23
The case against Luca is dropped, so Luca gives in to his inner demons to celebrate the fact that he now owns Vegas and the cops can't touch him. Torello uses these personal flaws and violent tendencies against Luca.
22	22	"Ground Zero"	Peter Medak	Story by : Chuck Adamson & Michael Mann; Teleplay by : Robert Eisele & Frederick Rappaport and Frank Megna & Peter Lance	March 13, 1987	N/A	13.0/23
Luca's closest friend and associate Pauli Taglia testifies against him, after out of control Luca rapes his girlfriend. L.A. crime boss Nat Martino tries to push Luca out of Vegas. Luca learns Martino's big secret and fights back.

=== Season 2 (1987–88) ===
No. overall	No. in season	Title	Directed by	Written by	Original release date	U.S. viewers (millions)	Rating/Share
23	1	"The Senator, the Movie Star and the Mob"	John Nicolella	Story by : Peter Lance and Mark Rosner & Michael Mann; Teleplay by : Peter Lance	September 22, 1987	13.1	12.3/21
Torello's team must protect a US Senator, the head of the Senate subcommittee that will investigates the mob, a glamorous actress, who wants to cut her ties to the mob, and a lusty, sleazy politician with a serious gambling addiction.
24	2	"Blast from the Past"	Eugene Corr	Ken Solarz	September 29, 1987	/	14.2/26
Torello's ex is in Vegas with her new man. When they were at a robbery he is taken by the robbers. When she sees the local police are not doing anything, she calls Torello who clashes with the cop in charge.
25	3	"Always a Blonde"	Robert Dalva	Tom Towler	October 20, 1987	12.6	10.9/18
The Senterros, a family of Mexican cattle ranchers, controls the marijuana trade, so Torello's unit sets up a sting operation, but detective Joey Indelli leaves to try to save a callgirl from her sadistic pimp.
26	4	"Atomic Fallout"	Bill Duke	Story by : Tom Towler & Ken Solarz; Teleplay by : Tom Towler & Ken Solarz and Peter Lance	October 27, 1987	14.4	12.0/22
Torello's after a killer, who might be a federal employee. Following the killer's trail, Mike ends up in Mexico, where he witnesses a drug smuggling operation led by Luca.
27	5	"Shockwaves"	Bill Duke	T : Gail Morgan Hickman; S/T : Mark Rosner	November 3, 1987	13.9	12.1/22
Torello's ordered by the government to leave Luca alone, since he's now their asset. Abrams quits his job immediately in disgust. Luca's former associates start to fear for their future in the crime business.
28	6	"Robbery, Armed"	James Quinn	Gail Morgan Hickman	November 10, 1987	15.4	11.7/21
Torello's having a birthday party in a restaurant. His best friend and partner Sgt. Danny Krychek is shot in the bathroom. He whispers a clue to who the shooter is and heads for surgery. Mike must beat the clock to catch the assassin.
29	7	"Little Girl Lost"	James Quinn	Story by : Ken Solarz & Tom Towler and Teleplay by : Ken Solarz & Tom Towler and Gail Morgan Hickman & Mark Rosner Gail Morgan Hickman	November 24, 1987	12.9	11.3/20
A man hires a private detective to find his girlfriend, who turns out to be the granddaughter of a mobster. Things don't go well. Meanwhile, Abrams has become an addict, so sympathetic Luca offers him a place in his team.
30	8	"Love Hurts"	David Soul	Ann Powell & Rose Schacht	December 8, 1987	15.3	12.6/23
Luca is financing a movie and falls for the provocative leading lady. She turns out to be more than even he can chew.
31	9	"MIG-21"	David Jackson	Story by : Allan Weisbecker; Teleplay by : Allan Weisbecker and Tom Towler & Gail Morgan Hickman	December 15, 1987	15.1	13.3/23
A Russian pilot defects by flying his plane into the U.S. and landing in Nevada. Torello and his men are assigned to protect him. They become friends. But Torello learns that the government is considering trading him for the U2 pilot being held in the Soviet Union. And they try to stop it from happening. Abrams who now works for Luca helps him get something on a guy whose business he wants to buy.
32	10	"Moulin Rouge"	David Soul	S : Gail Morgan Hickman; T : Howard Chesley & Nancy Audley	January 5, 1988	17.8	11.1/19
A casino owned by an African American is being hit with everything, from threats to bombs. Reporter Suzanne Terry's back to investigate the attacks and runs into her old flame, Abrams.
33	11	"Seize the Time"	Mark Rosner	Mark Rosner & Tom Towler	January 12, 1988	15.8	12.7/22
Torello tries to prove Iris, the African-American owner of the casino Moulin Rouge, that her partner might be using the place for money-laundering.
34	12	"Femme Fatale"	Jan Eliasberg	Story by : Peter Lance; Teleplay by : Peter Lance & Gail Morgan Hickman	January 19, 1988	16.9	12.5/22
Torello helps a pretty Asian girl find her missing father, who's been owing money to some loan sharks. What he doesn't know is that she's actually a secret agent of Communist China on a radioactive mission.
35	13	"Protected Witness"	Paul Kransky	T : Gail Morgan Hickman; S/T : Yabo Yablonsky	February 2, 1988	16.9	13.7/23
A Chicago mobster with a contract on his head becomes the target of Torello, who wants him alive, and Luca, who wants him dead.
36	14	"Last Rites"	Colin Bucksey	Story by : Marvin Kupfer; Teleplay by : Tom Towler & Gail Morgan Hickman	February 9, 1988	14.7	11.0/18
One of Luca's former bosses Manny Weisbord suffers a heart-attack. Luca goes to extreme lengths to get him a new heart, but with Manny's fate hanging in the balance and their own future in Vegas uncertain, mobsters Max Goldman and Steve Kordo conspire to take out Luca.
37	15	"Pauli Taglia's Dream"	Jeff Stein	Story by : Michael Mann; Teleplay by : Tom Towler & Ken Solarz	March 1, 1988	13.2	11.4/19
It is revealed, from Pauli's point of view through a series of flashbacks, how Pauli and Luca survived the atomic blast that seemingly killed them at the end of season 1, and generally how Pauli's relationship with Luca has evolved. A recovering Pauli must withstand federal inquiry and suspicions of espionage while hatching a plan to escape an Army medical facility with Luca, aided by an inside operative friendly to Manny Weisbord.
38	16	"Roadrunner"	Jeff Stein	Story by : Ken Solarz & Gail Morgan Hickman; Teleplay by : Ken Solarz & Gail Morgan Hickman and Tom Towler	March 15, 1988	14.8	11.4/21
Torello goes into the desert after an escaped convict and his girlfriend. However, a corrupt local cop wants them both dead, even if he has to kill Torello to get them.
39	17	"The Brothel Wars"	Mark Rosner	Mark Rosner	March 22, 1988	14.5	11.8/21
Pauli's girlfriend, a prostitute, ends up being the latest casualty in a violent war between competing brothels. Torello and his team work to secure justice for grieving Pauli, while tangling with a corrupt judge and local cops.
40	18	"Byline"	Eugene Corr	Peyton Webb	March 29, 1988	/	12.9/23
Torello's friend Joe Krinsky, a reporter from Chicago, arrives in Las Vegas seeking to expose Luca and some nefarious drug connections. Luca, who is posturing to gain traction in the global heroin trade, is visibly troubled by Krinsky's snooping around, hinting at some past history between the two. When Krinsky turns up dead before he can complete his story, Torello's team must try to put the pieces together. Meanwhile, Abrams and Torello have an icy reunion.
41	19	"The Hearings"	Mimi Leder	Ken Solarz	April 5, 1988	16.7	12.2/21
Luca's connections to the government are questioned in a Senate hearing and charges are about to be brought up against him, but the Vietnam War changes everything.
42	20	"Pursuit (series finale pt 1 of 3)"	Colin Bucksey	Lee Maddux	April 26, 1988	12.5	10.0/17
Torello and his crew pursue Luca, who is hiding out in a small Central American republic where he has muscled his way into a tenuous relationship with the president, senior politicians, and law enforcement. The US government offers little assistance, but Torello has a contact who can help. When things heat up at the presidential palace, the president tries to push back against Luca, but may have underestimated Luca's desperation.
43	21	"Escape (series finale pt 2 of 3)"	Colin Bucksey	Gail Morgan Hickman	May 3, 1988	13.0	10.7/18
Luca orchestrates a coup and strong arms federal law enforcement to aggressively pursue Torello's team on a trumped up charge. Danny is arrested and placed in a heavily fortified prison, where despite undergoing physical torture, he refuses to sign a bogus confession in exchange for his freedom. Torello seeks assistance from among criminals who distrust Luca. As Danny is about to face execution, a jail break plan is hatched. Luca ultimately fails to sway the military leadership in has favor, and the country moves forward toward democratic elections.
44	22	"Going Home (series finale pt 3 of 3)"	Paul Krasny	James Becket	May 10, 1988	17.0	11.7/20
Torello is summoned to meet with the interim president, who despite Torello's protests seems content to let Luca continue to operate. As Torello's team faces deportation, Max arrives with bad news for Luca. Reporter Suzanne Terry pulls enough political strings to delay Torello's departure, and a seemingly severed alliance is renewed. Torello survives an attempt on his life, and ratchets up the heat on Luca's heroin operation. Luca sniffs a rat and as bodies pile up, Torello fears the worst for his longtime friend. Abrams becomes the pawn in a deadly game.

== Reaction ==
When the show debuted on September 18, 1986, the two-hour pilot had a 20.1 national Nielsen rating and a 32 percent audience share. The ratings dipped when it was counter-programmed against ABC's Moonlighting. By October, the show was dropping in the ratings. The show was moved to Friday nights after Miami Vice on December 5, 1986, where its ratings improved but it still lost to Falcon Crest. NBC temporarily pulled Crime Story off the schedule after the season finale on March 13, 1987. In order to get more people to watch, Farina and other cast members promoted the show in five U.S. cities.

The New York Times wrote, "With its first-rate cast, Crime Story might have had the offbeat, compelling authenticity of an Elmore Leonard novel. But the show looks suspiciously as if it would be more than willing to settle for the mindless glitz of Miami Vice". In his review for The Washington Post, Tom Shales wrote, "When the smoke clears away, a viewer may feel impressed yet unmoved. But then, if all the smoke cleared away, there'd be no show".

John Haslett Cuff, in his review for The Globe and Mail, wrote, "The characters and locales are as greasy as the rain-soaked streets, and in the show's best moments there is a dangerous glitter that happily transcends the cartoon violence of too much television".

Time magazine's Richard Zoglin praised the show for being "the most realistic TV cop show in years, yet the emotions reach almost baroque heights".

=== Accolades ===
Year	Award	Category	Episode	Nominee(s)	Result
1987	Primetime Creative Arts Emmy Awards	Outstanding Cinematography for a Series	"Top of the World"	James A. Contner	Nominated
1987	Primetime Creative Arts Emmy Awards	Outstanding Hairstyling for a Series	"Top of the World"	Bunny Parker	Nominated
1987	Primetime Creative Arts Emmy Awards	Outstanding Sound Mixing for a Series	"Pilot"	Alan Bernard, Randy McDonald, Bill Nicholson, Dean Okrand	Nominated
1988	Primetime Creative Arts Emmy Awards	Outstanding Hairstyling for a Series	"Moulin Rouge"	Bunny Parker	Nominated

=== Legacy ===
Time ranked Crime Story as one of the best television programs of 1986 and of the 1980s.

In their 1988 book, The Critics' Choice — The Best of Crime and Detective TV, authors Max Allan Collins and John Javna chose Crime Story as one of the "Top 10 Best Police TV Series (Police Procedurals) of All Time".

== Influence ==
Crime Story and Wiseguy were the prototypes for later arc-driven television series, such as 24 and The Sopranos that have continuing story lines over multiple episodes. In addition, in another measure of this series' influence, numerous actors and actresses that originated on Crime Story in recurring or guest-starring roles later ended up on Wiseguy, including Ray Sharkey, Steve Ryan, Debbie Harry, William Russ, Anthony Denison, Stanley Tucci, Ted Levine, Patricia Charbonneau, Darlanne Fleugel, and Kevin Spacey.

After the first season, the show was nominated for three Emmys, all in technical categories.

== Home media ==
Unusually for a television show at the time, the entire series (except for the unaired episode) was released on a series of VHS tapes in 1991 from Starmaker. This is the only official release which has the original music.

Anchor Bay Entertainment released the entire series on DVD in Region 1 between 2003 and 2005.

On November 15, 2011, Image Entertainment released Crime Story- The Complete Series: 25th Anniversary Edition on DVD in Region 1. The 9-disc set contains all 44 episodes of the series. However, it has been criticized for having a visual quality no better than when the episodes were originally broadcast, and for removing songs from the soundtrack because they were too expensive to license.

In Region 4, Shock Entertainment released the complete series on DVD in Australia on March 7, 2012.

As of May 1, 2019, the entire series is available on Amazon's Prime Video except in some regions like Australia. The previous music licensing issues have not been resolved, with original songs still replaced on the soundtrack.

DVD name	Ep #	Release date
Season One	21	November 4, 2003
Season Two	22	September 20, 2005
The Complete Series	43	November 15, 2011

== See also ==
- List of television shows set in Las Vegas
