= Gold Coast Hotel and Casino =

Casino hotel in Nevada, United States

Coordinates: 36°6′59″N 115°11′32″W

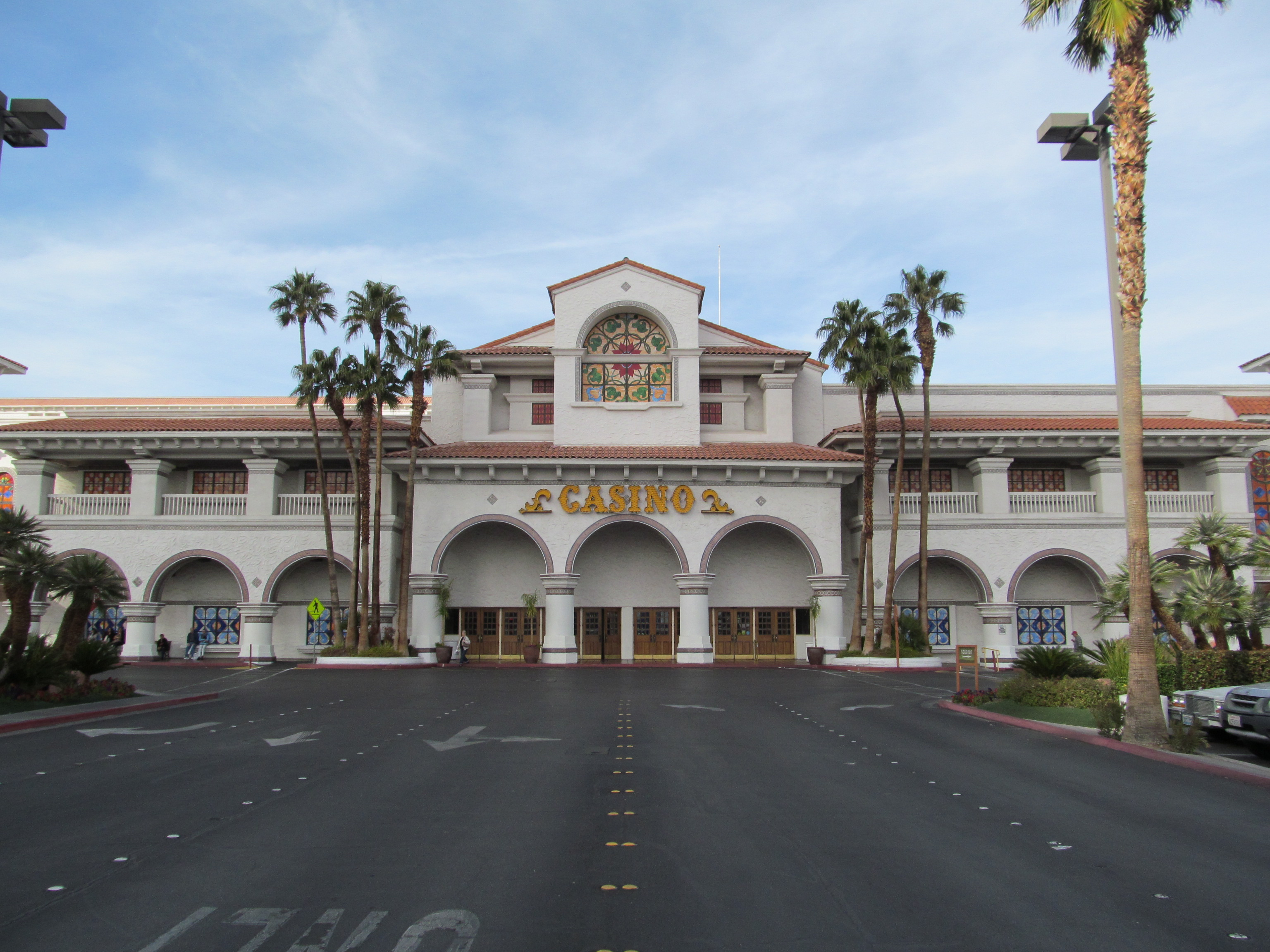
- Interactive map of Gold Coast Hotel and Casino
- Location: Paradise, Nevada, U.S.; 4000 W. Flamingo Road
- Opened: December 21, 1986; 39 years ago
- No. of rooms: 711
- Gaming space: 87,000 sq ft (8,100 m^{2})
- Signature attractions: Gold Coast Bowling Center
- Notable restaurants: Cornerstone; TGI Fridays
- Casino type: Land-based
- Owner: Boyd Gaming
- Renovated in: 1988, 2002, 2008
- Website: goldcoastcasino.com

The Gold Coast Hotel and Casino is a hotel and casino located in Paradise, Nevada, United States. This locals' casino is owned and operated by Boyd Gaming. The Gold Coast is located one mile (1.6 km) west of the Las Vegas Strip on West Flamingo Road. It is located across the street from the Palms Casino Resort and the Rio All Suite Hotel and Casino.

== History ==
The Gold Coast opened in December 1986. It was the first casino built from the ground up by Las Vegas casino mogul Michael Gaughan, who already operated the Barbary Coast on the Las Vegas Strip. Upon opening, the Gold Coast was the first casino to have a first-run movie theater in Las Vegas under the SyuFy Luxury Theatres (later Century Theatres) namesake, which would last up until late-2001 when Palms Casino Resort would open their location adjacent to its location with their own movie theater (the original MGM Grand had a theater screening MGM classics prior to Gold Coast's opening). It was specifically catering to the growing "locals" market of the Las Vegas suburbs. It was the second major resort built on the west side of Interstate 15, ten years after Palace Station. In October 1995, the largest jackpot in the state at the time, $10,918,881.00, was won by an anonymous man on a "Megabucks" slot machine.

The Gold Coast went through major renovations in 2002 that provided additional space for parking, restaurants and gaming. During the renovations, the resort's theme was changed from a dark country western gambling hall to a more modern gaming facility. Several acts such as The Jordanaires and Forever Plaid have taken place at the casino's 490-seat Gold Coast Showroom. Gaughan merged his Coast Casinos brand, which included the Gold Coast, with Boyd Gaming in 2004.

Along with several other local casinos, Gold Coast closed its poker rooms in 2011 due to financial reasons.

In August 2016, Gold Coast opened a new steakhouse, Cornerstone, in the space formerly occupied by the Cortez Room.

== Film history ==
The Gold Coast was featured in the film Mars Attacks! directed by Tim Burton.

The Gold Coast was featured on the television show Cops Season 10, episode 6.

== See also ==
- Gold Coast Hotel & Casino v. United States
