= NASCAR Truck Series at Michigan International Speedway =

Annual auto race at Michigan International Speedway

DQS Solutions & Staffing 250

NASCAR Truck Series
- Venue: Michigan International Speedway
- Location: Cambridge Township, Michigan, United States
- Corporate sponsor: DQS Solutions / Precision Vehicle Logistics
- First race: 1999
- Distance: 250 miles (402.336 km)
- Laps: 125 (Stage 1: 30 Stage 2: 30 Stage 3: 65)
- Previous names: goracing.com 200 (1999); Michigan 200 (2000, 2002, 2007, 2009); Sears 200 (2003); Line-X Spray-On Truck Bedliners 200 (2004); Paramount Health Insurance 200 (2005); Con-way Freight 200 (2006); Cool City Customs 200 (2008); VFW 200 (2010–2012); Michigan National Guard 200 (2013); Careers For Veterans 200 (2014); Careers For Veterans 200 presented by Cooper Standard and Brad Keselowski's Checkered Flag Foundation (2015–2016); LTi Printing 200 (2017); Corrigan Oil 200 (2018–2019); Henry Ford Health System 200 (2020)
- Most wins (driver): Greg Biffle; Travis Kvapil; Brett Moffitt (2)
- Most wins (team): Roush Fenway Racing (5)
- Most wins (manufacturer): Toyota (10)

Circuit information
- Surface: Asphalt
- Length: 2.0 mi (3.2 km)
- Turns: 4

Pickup truck racing events in the NASCAR Truck Series have been held at the Michigan International Speedway in Cambridge Township, Michigan since 1999. The race is currently known as the DQS Solutions & Staffing 250 Powered by Precision Vehicle Logistics.

As the race returned to the schedule in 2025, the event was lengthened from 200 to 250 miles due to the Xfinity race not being on their schedule.

== Past winners ==
Year	Date	No.	Driver	Team	Manufacturer	Race Distance		Race Time	Average Speed (mph)	Report	Ref
Year	Date	No.	Driver	Team	Manufacturer	Laps	Miles (km)	Race Time	Average Speed (mph)	Report	Ref
1999	July 24	50	Greg Biffle	Roush Racing	Ford	100	200 (321.868)	1:38:27	121.889	Report	
2000	July 22	50	Greg Biffle	Roush Racing	Ford	100	200 (321.868)	1:26:42	138.408	Report	
2001	Not held										
2002	July 27	18	Robert Pressley	Bobby Hamilton Racing	Dodge	100	200 (321.868)	1:24:23	142.208	Report	
2003	July 26	62	Brendan Gaughan	Orleans Racing	Dodge	100	200 (321.868)	1:17:54	154.044	Report	
2004	July 31	24	Travis Kvapil	Bang Racing	Toyota*	100	200 (321.868)	1:35:38	125.479	Report	
2005	June 18	46	Dennis Setzer	Morgan-Dollar Motorsports	Chevrolet	100	200 (321.868)	1:38:03	122.387	Report	
2006	June 17	23	Johnny Benson Jr.	Bill Davis Racing	Toyota	102*	204 (328.306)	1:45:02	116.534	Report	
2007	June 16	6	Travis Kvapil	Roush Fenway Racing	Ford	100	200 (321.868)	1:28:39	135.364	Report	
2008	June 14	99	Erik Darnell	Roush Fenway Racing	Ford	100	200 (321.868)	1:25:27	140.433	Report	
2009	June 13	6	Colin Braun	Roush Fenway Racing	Ford	100	200 (321.868)	1:31:43	130.838	Report	
2010	June 12	51	Aric Almirola	Billy Ballew Motorsports	Toyota	100	200 (321.868)	1:41:13	118.558	Report	
2011	August 20	2	Kevin Harvick	Kevin Harvick Inc.	Chevrolet	102*	204 (328.306)	1:36:53	126.338	Report	
2012	August 18	30	Nelson Piquet Jr.	Turner Motorsports	Chevrolet	100	200 (321.868)	1:26:01	139.508	Report	
2013	August 17	31	James Buescher	Turner Scott Motorsports	Chevrolet	100	200 (321.868)	1:39:48	120.24	Report	
2014	August 16	98	Johnny Sauter	ThorSport Racing	Toyota	100	200 (321.868)	1:14:29	161.11	Report	
2015	August 15	51	Kyle Busch	Kyle Busch Motorsports	Toyota	100	200 (321.868)	1:33:04	128.94	Report	
2016	August 27	11	Brett Moffitt	Red Horse Racing	Toyota	100	200 (321.868)	1:47:24	111.732	Report	
2017	August 12	99	Bubba Wallace	MDM Motorsports	Chevrolet	100	200 (321.868)	1:34:52	126.493	Report	
2018	August 11	16	Brett Moffitt	Hattori Racing Enterprises	Toyota	100	200 (321.868)	1:32:11	130.175	Report	
2019	August 10	16	Austin Hill	Hattori Racing Enterprises	Toyota	105*	210 (337.961)	1:50:54	113.616	Report	
2020	August 7	21	Zane Smith	GMS Racing	Chevrolet	107*	214 (344.398)	2:12:29	96.918	Report	
2021 – 2024	Not held										
2025	June 7	52	Stewart Friesen	Halmar Friesen Racing	Toyota	139*	278 (447.398)	2:27:53	112.792	Report	
2026	June 6	1	Corey Heim	Tricon Garage	Toyota	125	250 (402.34)	2:05:01	119.984	Report	
2027	June 19									Report	

- 2004: First NASCAR win for Toyota.
- 2006, 2011, 2019, 2020 and 2025: The race was extended due to a NASCAR Overtime finish.
- 2012: Piquet scored his first win in the Truck Series, thus becoming the first Brazilian driver to win a Truck Series event.
- 2025: Longest NASCAR Truck race (in mileage).

=== Multiple winners (drivers) ===
# Wins	Driver	Years won
2	Greg Biffle	1999, 2000
2	Travis Kvapil	2004, 2007
2	Brett Moffitt	2016, 2018

=== Multiple winners (teams) ===
# Wins	Team	Years won
5	Roush Fenway Racing	1999, 2000, 2007, 2008, 2009
2	Turner Scott Motorsports	2012, 2013
2	Hattori Racing Enterprises	2018, 2019

=== Manufacturer wins ===
# Wins	Make	Years won
10	(Japan) Toyota	2004, 2006, 2010, 2014, 2015, 2016, 2018, 2019, 2025, 2026
6	(United States) Chevrolet	2005, 2011, 2012, 2013, 2017, 2020
5	(United States) Ford	1999, 2000, 2007, 2008, 2009
2	(United States) Dodge	2002, 2003

Previous race: TBA	NASCAR Craftsman Truck Series; DQS Solutions & Staffing 250	Next race: LiUNA! 150
