= Orleans Racing =

NASCAR team

Orleans/South Point Racing
- Owner(s): Michael Gaughan, Walker Evans, Bill McAnally
- Base: Las Vegas Valley
- Series: Craftsman Truck Series, NASCAR West Series
- Race drivers: Brendan Gaughan, Steve Park, Scott Lynch (CTS); Austin Cameron, Hershel McGriff, Scott Lynch (West)
- Manufacturer: Chevrolet, Dodge
- Opened: 2000
- Closed: 2007

Career
- Drivers' Championships: 3 (West Series)
- Race victories: 9 (Craftsman Truck), 11 (West)

Orleans Racing (also known as South Point Racing), was a NASCAR team that competed in the NASCAR Craftsman Truck Series and the NASCAR West Series. It was owned by businessman Michael Gaughan for most of its existence, although others have had a partial interest in the team. The team fielded the No. 62 and No. 77 Dodges for Michael's son, Brendan, fellow West Series driver Scott Lynch, and former Nextel Cup driver Steve Park. The team was notable for being the only NASCAR team based in the state of Nevada, on the grounds of Las Vegas Motor Speedway.

== Beginnings ==
=== Winston West ===
SPR debuted in the Winston West Series in a partnership with famous West Series owner Bill McAnally and famous racer Walker Evans. Running the famous No. 16 Chevrolet sponsored by NAPA Auto Parts and with former off-road racer Brendan Gaughan at the wheel, the combination scored nine victories and back-to-back West Series championships in 2000 and 2001. The team would later move Gaughan up to the Truck Series while running Scott Lynch in the West Series. McAnally would continue his West team with drivers such as Austin Cameron and Brian Ickler. Lynch continued to drive for the team, winning both Rookie of the Year and the West Series Championship in 2003.

== Glory days ==
=== Craftsman Truck Series ===
==== Truck No. 62 History ====
Gaughan and his Orleans Racing team would move up to the Trucks full-time in 2002 with NAPA and the number 62 to contend for Rookie of the Year honors. Despite the criticisms of many who said that a team based in the Western United States would not make it in NASCAR, Gaughan proved all of his detractors wrong by winning both races at Texas en route to an 11th-place finish in the points and the 2002 ROTY crown. In 2003 Orleans Racing would only improve, as Gaughan would win a series high six races, including his second consecutive sweep at Texas and a hometown victory at Vegas, heading into the season finale at Homestead. In an ironic twist, lady luck would deal the Orleans team a bad hand, as Gaughan was taken out in a wreck on lap 101 with Marty Houston and finished fourth in points behind Travis Kvapil. The team's underdog status moved Gaughan up into the Nextel Cup Series, to drive for Roger Penske in 2004. While Gaughan was in Cup, Orleans tapped former Cup driver Steve Park to wheel their No. 62. Park would take his first career Truck Series win at Fontana in 2005, but struggled with consistency and was released before season's end. Scott Lynch would take over the No. 62 for the last races of the season, but like Park, struggled and was released. With the reduction in manufacturer support from Dodge, Orleans was forced to downsize to only the No. 77 truck in 2006.

==== Truck No. 62 results ====
Year	Driver	No.	Make	1	2	3	4	5	6	7	8	9	10	11	12	13	14	15	16	17	18	19	20	21	22	23	24	25	Owners	Pts
2002	Brendan Gaughan	62	Dodge	DAY; 13	DAR; 20	MAR; 9	GTY; 11	PPR; 26	DOV; 7	TEX; 1*	MEM; 13	MLW; 4	KAN; 27	KEN; 11	NHA; 5	MCH; 18	IRP; 29	NSH; 6	RCH; 16	TEX; 1	SBO; 11	LVS; 8	CAL; 3	PHO; 13	HOM; 11				11th	2893
2003	Brendan Gaughan	62	Dodge	DAY; 10	DAR; 3	MMR; 3	MAR; 16	CLT; 2	DOV; 18	TEX; 1	MEM; 8	MLW; 1*	KAN; 9	KEN; 22	GTW; 1*	MCH; 1*	IRP; 4	NSH; 5	BRI; 4	RCH; 7	NHA; 5	CAL; 2	LVS; 1*	SBO; 15	TEX; 1*	MAR; 11	PHO; 12	HOM; 29	4th	3797
2004	Steve Park	62	Dodge	DAY; 27	ATL; 12	MAR; 26	MFD; 27	CLT; 12	DOV; 13	TEX; 10	MEM; 11	MLW; 4	KAN; 4	KEN; 6	GTW; 31	MCH; 17	IRP; 22	NSH; 5	BRI; 9	RCH; 12	NHA; 14	LVS; 3*	CAL; 8	TEX; 12	MAR; 23	PHO; 6	DAR; 5	HOM; 23	9th	3138
2005	Steve Park	62	Dodge	DAY; 23	CAL; 1	ATL; 35	MAR; 24	GTY; 13	MFD; 20	CLT; 5	DOV; 36	TEX; 16	MCH; 31	MLW; 7	KAN; 32	KEN; 8	MEM; 12	IRP; 30	NSH; 15	BRI; 15	RCH; 18	NHA; 12	LVS; 30						20th	2636
2005	Scott Lynch	62	Dodge																					MAR; 30	ATL; 25	TEX; 23	PHO; 18	HOM; 17	20th	2636

==== Truck No. 77 History ====
The No. 77 truck debuted as the No. 61 truck driven by West Series driver Scott Lynch, who scored 12th-place finishes at Homestead and Phoenix. After his release from Penske, Brendan returned to Orleans Racing in 2005. However, the season proved difficult due to the increase in competition and Gaughan could only muster a 19th-place finish in the points. In 2006, the team changed its name from Orleans Racing to South Point Racing, due to Michael's acquisition of South Coast Casino in exchange for selling Coast Casinos to Boyd Gaming. A high for the newly named South Point Racing was a second-place finish at Homestead and a 15th-place finish in points. The team, switching manufacturers to Chevrolet, climbed to 11th in points, with a near win at Texas.

==== Truck No. 77 results ====
Year	Driver	No.	Make	1	2	3	4	5	6	7	8	9	10	11	12	13	14	15	16	17	18	19	20	21	22	23	24	25	Owners	Pts
2003	Scott Lynch	61	Dodge	DAY	DAR	MMR	MAR	CLT	DOV	TEX	MEM	MLW	KAN	KEN	GTW	MCH	IRP	NSH	BRI	RCH	NHA	CAL	LVS; 12	SBO	TEX	MAR	PHO	HOM; 12	63rd	254
2004	Scott Lynch	61	Dodge	DAY	ATL	MAR	MFD	CLT	DOV	TEX	MEM	MLW	KAN	KEN	GTW	MCH	IRP	NSH	BRI	RCH	NHA	LVS; 19	CAL	TEX	MAR	PHO	DAR	HOM	62nd	106
2005	Brendan Gaughan	77	Dodge	DAY; 30	CAL; 21	ATL; DNQ	MAR; DNQ	GTY; 22	MFD; 15	CLT; 8	DOV; 16	TEX; 27	MCH; 11	MLW; 5	KAN; 8	KEN; 29	MEM; 3	IRP; 8	NSH; 6	BRI; 36	RCH; 11	NHA; 10	LVS; 35	MAR; 24	ATL; 15	TEX; 32	PHO; 23	HOM; 16	19th	2662
2006	Brendan Gaughan	77	Dodge	DAY; 24	CAL; 36	ATL; 13	MAR; 6	GTY; 14	CLT; 14	MFD; 17	DOV; 19	TEX; 26	MCH; 16	MLW; 19	KAN; 4	KEN; 3	MEM; 17	IRP; 16	NSH; 5	BRI; 17	NHA; 34	LVS; 15	TAL; 12	MAR; 19	ATL; 26	TEX; 17	PHO; 21	HOM; 2	16th	2894
2007	Brendan Gaughan	77	Chevy	DAY; 21	CAL; 21	ATL; 6	MAR; 25	KAN; 11	CLT; 35	MFD; 9	DOV; 36	TEX; 24	MCH; 3	MLW; 28	MEM; 22	KEN; 22	IRP; 10	NSH; 12	BRI; 2	GTW; 10	NHA; 25	LVS; 30	TAL; 16	MAR; 11	ATL; 8	TEX; 2	PHO; 13	HOM; 19	17th	2204

== Demise ==
For 2008, SPR was to merge with Toyota team Wyler Racing to form Wyler-Gaughan Racing. The partnership, however, would involve the Gaughans leaving their home state of Nevada for Mooresville, North Carolina and switching manufacturers to Toyota, along with having a teammate, Richard Johns. However, for unknown reasons, the deal fell through and South Point Racing was disbanded, with only Brendan and 10–12 of his crew remaining, eventually moving to Circle Bar Racing. The shop was inactive for three months but was most recently used by Cup teams as a shelter during the extremely rainy Auto Club 500.
