= NASCAR Craftsman Truck Series at Gateway Motorsports Park =

NASCAR Truck Series race at World Wide Technology Raceway (Gateway)

Toyota 200

NASCAR Craftsman Truck Series
- Venue: World Wide Technology Raceway at Gateway
- Location: Madison, Illinois, U.S.
- Corporate sponsor: Toyota (title sponsor); CK Power (presenting sponsor)
- First race: 1998
- Last race: 2024
- Distance: 200 miles (321.869 km)
- Laps: 160; Stages 1/2: 55 each Final stage: 50
- Previous names: Ram Tough 200 (1998–2001); Missouri-Illinois Dodge Dealers Ram Tough 200 (2002–2004, 2006–2007); Dodge Ram Tough 200 (2005); Camping World 200 (2008); Copart 200 (2009); CampingWorld.com 200 (2010); Drivin' for Linemen 200 (2014–2017); Eaton 200 (2018); CarShield 200 (2019–2020); Toyota 200 (2021–2024)
- Most wins (driver): Ted Musgrave; Sheldon Creed; Corey Heim (2)
- Most wins (team): GMS Racing (4)
- Most wins (manufacturer): Chevrolet (12)

Circuit information
- Surface: Asphalt
- Length: 1.25 mi (2.01 km)
- Turns: 4

The Toyota 200 was a NASCAR Craftsman Truck Series race at World Wide Technology Raceway at Gateway (formerly Gateway Motorsports Park). The race has been held each year since 1998 except for 2011, 2012 and 2013. The track closed after the 2010 race, reopened in 2012 under new ownership, and the race returned to the schedule in 2014.

== Race history ==
Rick Carelli won the first truck race at Gateway. A year later Greg Biffle won the first night race for the series at Gateway. In 2000, the race date was moved to May, and the time of race was once again day. Jack Sprague not only won that race, but holds the average speed record for the event to this day. A year later Ted Musgrave won the event after showers moved the race back into the evening.

In 2004, the seroes was using its version of the green-white-checkered rule, which stated that every race must end under green. With five laps left in the race Jack Sprague cut a tire bringing out the caution. Caution would come out. On the first green-white-checkered attempt a wreck in turn 1 brought the yellow flag out again. The very next green flag saw first and second position drivers, Shane Hmiel and Bobby Hamilton get together bringing the yellow out again. On the second attempt on the back straightway, Rick Crawford's truck was involved in an accident that had the truck sliding on its side against the wall. On the fourth attempt, David Starr came out on top in a race with a record for most green-white-checkered laps and most attempts. Shortly thereafter NASCAR adopted a universal green-white-checkered rule for all three of its major series which said that if the caution flag comes out at any time during the green-white-checkered run the race will end under caution.

NASCAR-sanctioned events stopped being run at the track after the 2010 season when Dover Motorsports shut down the circuit at the end of the 2010 season. The circuits were sold to former club racer and INDYCAR Indy Lights driver Curtis Francois in 2011, who promptly brought back the NHRA tour in 2012. Francois and NASCAR successfully negotiated the Truck Series return on June 14, 2014.

During the 2016 race, Spencer Gallagher and John Wes Townley crashed in turn one and got into a fight after climbing out of their trucks.

In March 2018, CK Power was announced as the new presenting sponsor for the race, and in June, Villa Lighting and Eaton Electrical Products were announced as that year's title sponsors. CarShield became the title sponsor in 2019 and returned in 2020. Toyota became the title sponsor for the 2021 race at the track, which was the first time that it was the opening race of the Truck Series playoffs.

== Past winners ==
Year	Date	No.	Driver	Team	Manufacturer	Race Distance		Race Time	Average Speed (mph)	Report	Ref
Year	Date	No.	Driver	Team	Manufacturer	Laps	Miles (km)	Race Time	Average Speed (mph)	Report	Ref
1998	September 19	6	Rick Carelli	Chesrown Racing	Chevrolet	160	200 (321.868)	2:00:17	99.764	Report	
1999	August 20	50	Greg Biffle	Roush Racing	Ford	160	200 (321.868)	1:47:17	111.853	Report	
2000	May 7	24	Jack Sprague	Hendrick Motorsports	Chevrolet	160	200 (321.868)	1:45:31	113.726	Report	
2001	May 6	1	Ted Musgrave	Ultra Motorsports	Dodge	160	200 (321.868)	1:46:56	112.237	Report	
2002	May 5	29	Terry Cook	K Automotive Racing	Ford	160	200 (321.868)	1:49:46	109.323	Report	
2003	July 19	62	Brendan Gaughan	Orleans Racing	Dodge	160	200 (321.868)	2:00:37	99.489	Report	
2004	July 17	75	David Starr	Spears Motorsports	Chevrolet	174*	217.5 (350.032)	2:19:17	93.694	Report	
2005	April 30	1	Ted Musgrave	Ultra Motorsports	Dodge	160	200 (321.868)	1:58:59	100.854	Report	
2006	April 29	30	Todd Bodine	Germain Racing	Toyota	160	200 (321.868)	2:21:14	84.966	Report	
2007	September 1	23	Johnny Benson Jr.	Bill Davis Racing	Toyota	160	200 (321.868)	1:55:46	103.657	Report	
2008	September 6	33	Ron Hornaday Jr.	Kevin Harvick Inc.	Chevrolet	160	200 (321.868)	2:07:51	93.86	Report	
2009	September 12	5	Mike Skinner	Randy Moss Motorsports	Toyota	162*	202.5 (325.892)	2:16:06	89.273	Report	
2010*	July 17*	2	Kevin Harvick	Kevin Harvick Inc.	Chevrolet	160	200 (321.868)	1:57:40	101.983	Report	
2011 – 2013	Not held										
2014	June 14	54	Bubba Wallace	Kyle Busch Motorsports	Toyota	160	200 (321.868)	2:06:16	95.037	Report	
2015	June 13	00	Cole Custer	JR Motorsports	Chevrolet	160	200 (321.868)	2:03:45	96.97	Report	
2016	June 25	4	Christopher Bell	Kyle Busch Motorsports	Toyota	160	200 (321.868)	2:14:48	89.021	Report	
2017	June 17	8	John Hunter Nemechek	NEMCO Motorsports	Chevrolet	160	200 (321.868)	1:47:18	111.836	Report	
2018	June 23	24	Justin Haley	GMS Racing	Chevrolet	160	200 (321.868)	2:20:38	85.328	Report	
2019	June 22	45	Ross Chastain	Niece Motorsports	Chevrolet	160	200 (321.868)	1:57:27	102.171	Report	
2020	August 30	2	Sheldon Creed	GMS Racing	Chevrolet	160	200 (321.868)	2:00:23	99.682	Report	
2021	August 20	2	Sheldon Creed	GMS Racing	Chevrolet	163*	203.75 (327.63)	2:31:31	80.684	Report	
2022	June 4	51	Corey Heim	Kyle Busch Motorsports	Toyota	165*	206.25 (331.926)	2:23:14	86.397	Report	
2023	June 3	23	Grant Enfinger	GMS Racing	Chevrolet	162*	202.5 (325.892)	2:30:29	116.898	Report	
2024	June 1	11	Corey Heim	Tricon Garage	Toyota	160	200 (321.868)	2:01:27	98.806	Report	

- 2004, 2009, 2021-2023: The race was extended due to a NASCAR Overtime finish; 2004 took four attempts.
- 2010: The race was postponed from Friday night to Saturday afternoon due to power outage and was Susposed to be the last race at Gateway .
- 2020: Race postponed from August 21 to August 30 due to schedule changes resulting from the COVID-19 pandemic.

=== Multiple winners (drivers) ===
# Wins	Driver	Years won
2	Ted Musgrave	2001, 2005
2	Sheldon Creed	2020, 2021
2	Corey Heim	2022, 2024

=== Multiple winners (teams) ===
# Wins	Team	Years won
4	GMS Racing	2018, 2020, 2021, 2023
3	Kyle Busch Motorsports	2014, 2016, 2022
2	Ultra Motorsports	2001, 2005
2	Kevin Harvick Inc.	2008, 2010

=== Manufacturer wins ===
# Wins	Make	Years won
12	(United States) Chevrolet	1998, 2000, 2004, 2008, 2010, 2015, 2017-2021, 2023
7	(Japan) Toyota	2006, 2007, 2009, 2014, 2016, 2022, 2024
3	(United States) Dodge	2001, 2003, 2005
2	(United States) Ford	1999, 2002
