= Gold Coast Hotel & Casino v. United States =

- Court: United States Court of Appeals for the Ninth Circuit
- Full case name: Gold Coast Hotel & Casino, et al v. United States of America and Commissioner of Internal Revenue Service
- Submitted: December 12, 1997
- Decided: October 16, 1998
- Citations: 158 F.3d 484; 81 A.F.T.R.2d 98-970; 98-2 USTC ¶ 50,800; 98 Cal. Daily Op. Serv. 7817; 98 Daily Journal D.A.R. 10,860

Court membership
- Judges sitting: William A. Fletcher, Thomas G. Nelson, Robert H. Whaley (E.D. Wash.)

Case opinions
- Majority: Whaley

Gold Coast Hotel & Casino v. United States, 158 F.3d 484 (9th Cir. 1998), was a court case that addressed whether a casino, using the accrual method of accounting, could deduct the value of slot club points earned by slot club members in the tax year in which the members accumulated the minimum points required to redeem a prize, or whether the casino had to wait to deduct the value of the slot club points until the members actually redeemed them.

== Background ==
Accrual method taxpayers report income when earned and claim deductions when expenses are owed.

Accrual method taxpayers may claim deductions in the taxable year in which

1. all the events have occurred that establish the liability,
2. the amount of the liability can be determined with reasonable accuracy, and
3. economic performance has occurred with respect to the liability. Gold Coast Hotel is an example of a court applying the "all events" and "reasonable accuracy" prongs to determine whether a contingent liability is a deductible business expense.

For a general comparison of accrual method to the cash method, the other major process used to determine when a taxpayer has income, see Cash Method v. Accrual Method.

== Facts ==
Gold Coast Hotel & Casino (Gold Coast) is an accrual method taxpayer and operates a slot club, which is a promotional tool. Slot club members receive cards which they insert into the casino's slot machines. The cards track their slot club points, and a member may redeem the points for various prizes. At the time, each slot club point was worth $0.0021, such that 1,000 points entitled a customer to prizes worth $2.10. Under Nevada law, a customer's right to points became fixed when he or she accumulated 1,200 points.

On its 1989 and 1990 tax returns, Gold Coast deducted as an expense the slot club points that had not yet been redeemed over the previous year's ending balance. On both returns, Gold Coast also recaptured as income the value of accumulated slot club points that had not been redeemed in over a year and which it had deducted as an expense in the prior year.

== Arguments ==
Gold Coast argues that its deductions were proper because, using the all-events test, the last event that determined its liability occurred when the minimum number of slot club points needed to earn a prize is accumulated by a member, because under law the customer's right to the points became fixed. Gold Coast analogized their case to a Supreme Court decision in which the Court held that a casino could deduct the guaranteed payment accrued by progressive slot machines, even though the jackpot had not been won by the end of the tax year.

The Commissioner argued that, with respect to the slot club points, liability of the casino did not arise until members actually redeemed their points for prizes. Therefore, the casino should not be allowed to deduct as expenses those points which have not been redeemed. The Commissioner stressed that not all slot club members will choose to redeem their points, therefore Gold Coast's liability is not fixed until the points are actually redeemed. The commissioner relied on a previous Supreme Court decision that held that an employer that self-insured its employees' medical plan could not deduct the amount of money placed in a reserve account until reimbursement claims were actually filed.

== Holding ==
Gold Coast's deductions were proper, as its liability to members became fixed upon their accumulation of the minimum number of club points whether or not they chose to redeem them and because the amount of liability was known with reasonable certainty.

== Reasoning ==
First prong: the all-events test: The court found that the "fundamental premise" underlying the all-events test is that expenses may not be deducted until liability is firmly established. Therefore, the liability must be fixed and unconditional and not contested or contingent upon a future event. The court disagreed with the Commissioner as to the timing of when Gold Coast became liable to its slot club members. It rejected the Commissioner's claim that liability was not fixed until a customer redeemed his or her slot club point. Instead, the court held that Gold Coast's liability became fixed upon a member accumulating the minimum number of points required to redeem a prize. Quoting United States v. Hughes Properties, Inc., the court found that "[t]he existence of an absolute liability is necessary; absolute certainty that it will be discharged by payment is not." Therefore, just because a club member might choose not to redeem his or points in a certain year does not mean that Gold Coast's liability is not fixed. Furthermore, Gold Coast will simply recapture as income those liabilities that were not discharged by redemption of the points in the next year.

Second prong: liability must be determined with reasonable certainty:The court found that, because the parties had stipulated to the monetary value of each club point, the amount of the liability could be determined by multiplying this value by the number of accumulated points in accounts with more than the minimum number of points needed to claim a prize. Therefore the liability is capable of being determined with reasonable certainty.

== Significance ==
This case demonstrates a court determining whether an accrual method taxpayer may deduct liabilities that may or may not be paid in the taxable year. The court applied the test found in Treas. Reg. § 1.461-1(a)(2)(i) to determine that the casino's liabilities were in fact fixed on the date when the minimum number of club points were acquired. The fact that certain club members may choose not to redeem their points does not mean that they did not have an enforceable right against the casino. The court also pointed out that this decision would not lead to the casino escaping tax liability, as the casino would recapture as income the liabilities that were not actually discharged. The decision helps accrual method taxpayers understand when a contingent future liabilities become deductible expenses, allowing them to both file more accurate returns and better anticipate the tax consequences of their actions.
