= NASCAR Craftsman Truck Series at the Milwaukee Mile =

NASCAR Truck Series race at the Milwaukee Mile

LiUNA! 175

NASCAR Craftsman Truck Series
- Venue: Milwaukee Mile
- Location: West Allis, Wisconsin, United States
- Corporate sponsor: Laborers' International Union of North America
- First race: 1995
- Last race: 2024
- Distance: 175 miles (281.64 km)
- Laps: 175
- Previous names: Sears Auto Center 125 (1995); Sears Auto Center 200 (1996); Sears DieHard 200 (1997, 2000); DieHard 200 (1998–1999); GNC Live Well 200 (2001–2002); GNC 200 (2003); Black Cat Fireworks 200 (2004); Toyota Tundra Milwaukee 200 (2005–2007); Camping World RV Sales 200 (2008); Copart 200 (2009); Clean Harbors 175 (2023)
- Most wins (driver): Johnny Benson Jr. (3)
- Most wins (team): Ultra Motorsports and Bill Davis Racing (3)
- Most wins (manufacturer): Chevrolet (6)

Circuit information
- Surface: Asphalt
- Length: 1 mi (1.6 km)
- Turns: 4

The LiUNA! 175 was a race in the NASCAR Craftsman Truck Series that took place at the Milwaukee Mile in Wisconsin. The race was previously held from the series' first season in 1995 until 2009. The race was removed from the Truck Series schedule in 2010 and it returned to the schedule in 2023. It was once again removed from the schedule following the 2025 NASCAR Craftsman Truck Series.

== Past winners ==
Year	Date	No.	Driver	Team	Manufacturer	Race Distance		Race Time	Average Speed (mph)	Report	Ref
Year	Date	No.	Driver	Team	Manufacturer	Laps	Miles (km)	Race Time	Average Speed (mph)	Report	Ref
1995	July 1	3	Mike Skinner	Richard Childress Racing	Chevrolet	125	125 (201.168)	1:25:48	87.413	Report	
1996	July 6	24	Jack Sprague	Hendrick Motorsports	Chevrolet	200	200 (321.868)	2:16:39	87.816	Report	
1997	July 5	16	Ron Hornaday Jr.	Dale Earnhardt, Inc.	Chevrolet	200	200 (321.868)	1:53:34	105.665	Report	
1998	July 4	2	Mike Bliss	Ultra Motorsports	Ford	200	200 (321.868)	1:55:00	104.347	Report	
1999	July 3	50	Greg Biffle	Roush Racing	Ford	200	200 (321.868)	1:52:27	106.714	Report	
2000	July 1	99	Kurt Busch	Roush Racing	Ford	200	200 (321.868)	2:14:26	89.264	Report	
2001	June 30	1	Ted Musgrave	Ultra Motorsports	Dodge	200	200 (321.868)	2:09:07	92.939	Report	
2002	June 29	29	Terry Cook	K Automotive Racing	Ford	203*	203 (326.696)	1:56:34	104.49	Report	
2003	June 28	62	Brendan Gaughan	Orleans Racing	Dodge	200	200 (321.868)	1:49:24	109.689	Report	
2004	June 25	1	Ted Musgrave	Ultra Motorsports	Dodge	205*	205 (329.915)	2:27:47	83.230	Report	
2005	June 24	46	Dennis Setzer	Morgan-Dollar Motorsports	Chevrolet	200	200 (321.868)	1:49:11	109.907	Report	
2006	June 23	23	Johnny Benson Jr.	Bill Davis Racing	Toyota	200	200 (321.868)	2:20:04	85.673	Report	
2007	June 22	23	Johnny Benson Jr.	Bill Davis Racing	Toyota	200	200 (321.868)	2:05:39	95.503	Report	
2008	June 20	23	Johnny Benson Jr.	Bill Davis Racing	Toyota	200	200 (321.868)	2:13:48	89.686	Report	
2009	June 20*	33	Ron Hornaday Jr.	Kevin Harvick Inc.	Chevrolet	200	200 (321.868)	2:06:18	95.012	Report	
2010 – 2022	Not held										
2023	August 27	23	Grant Enfinger	GMS Racing	Chevrolet	175	177.625 (285.860)	2:04:23	85.683	Report	
2024	August 25	38	Layne Riggs	Front Row Motorsports	Ford	175	177.625 (285.860)	1:49:16	97.537	Report	

- 2002 & 2004: Race extended due to a green–white–checker finish.
- 2009: Race postponed from Friday to Saturday due to rain.

=== Multiple winners (drivers) ===
# Wins	Driver	Years won
3	Johnny Benson Jr.	2006–2008
2	Ron Hornaday Jr.	1997, 2009
2	Ted Musgrave	2001, 2004

=== Multiple winners (teams) ===
# Wins	Team	Years won
3	Ultra Motorsports	1998, 2001, 2004
3	Bill Davis Racing	2006, 2007, 2008
2	Roush Racing	1999, 2000

=== Manufacturer wins ===
# Wins	Make	Years won
6	(United States) Chevrolet	1995–1997, 2005, 2009, 2023
5	(United States) Ford	1998–2000, 2002, 2024
3	(United States) Dodge	2001, 2003, 2004
3	(Japan) Toyota	2006–2008
