= The Vanderpump Hotel =

Casino hotel in Paradise, Nevada

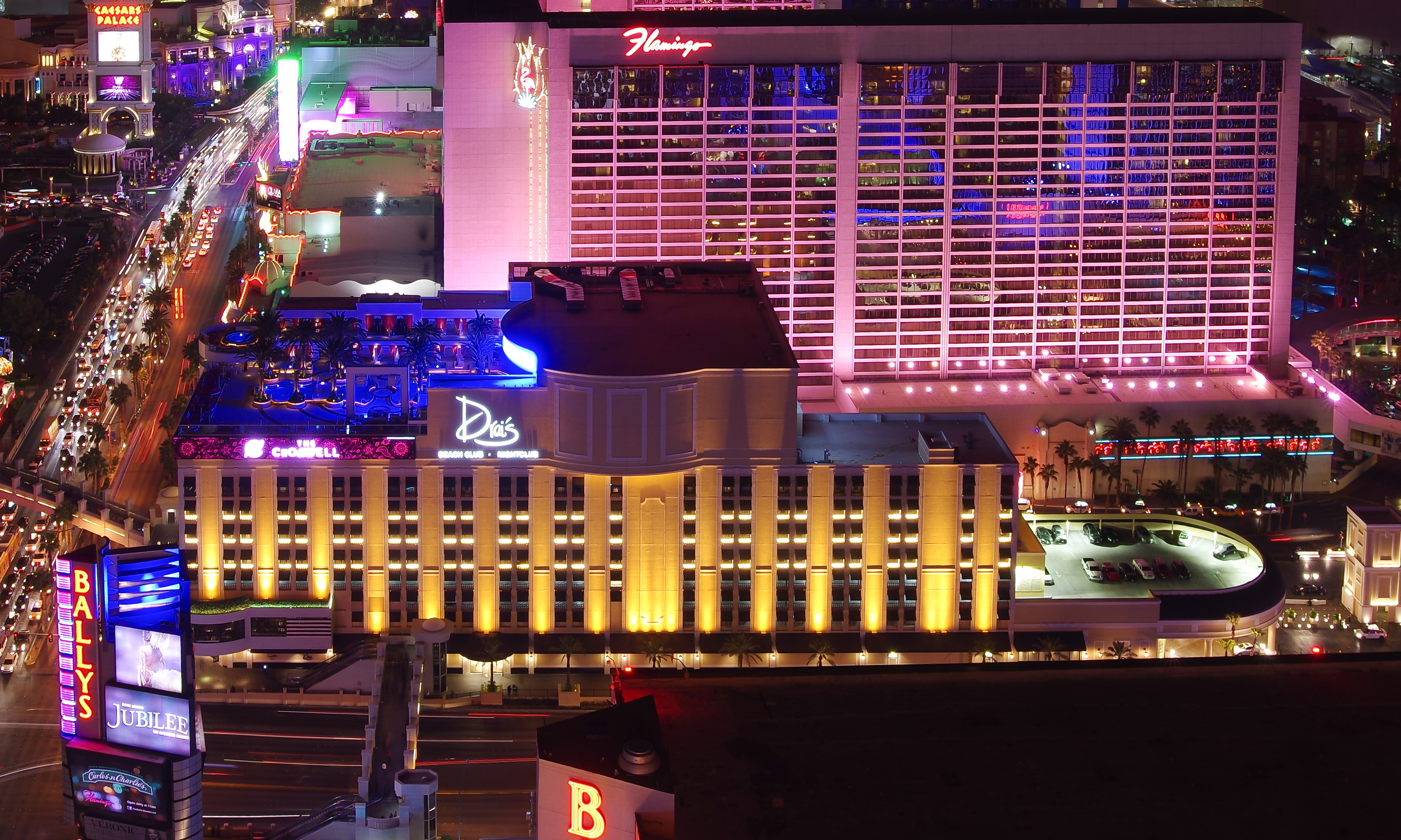
- The hotel in 2014 as The Cromwell

- Location within Las Vegas Strip Location within Nevada
- Interactive map of The Vanderpump Hotel
- Location: Paradise, Nevada, U.S.; 3595 South Las Vegas Boulevard; 36°6′54″N 115°10′19″W
- Opened: March 2, 1979; 47 years ago (as Barbary Coast); April 21, 2014; 12 years ago (as The Cromwell); June 11, 2026; 4 months ago (as The Vanderpump)
- Theme: French
- No. of rooms: 188
- Gaming space: 40,010 sq ft (3,717 m^{2})
- Signature attractions: Drai's After Hours; Drai's Beach Club & Nightclub (2014–2025)
- Notable restaurants: Michael's (until 2007); Giada
- Owner: Caesars Entertainment
- Previous names: Barbary Coast (1979–2007); Bill's Gamblin' Hall and Saloon (2007–2013); The Cromwell (2014–2026)
- Renovated in: 2013–14, 2025–26
- Website: caesars.com/vanderpump-hotel

The Vanderpump Hotel Las Vegas is a luxury boutique casino hotel on the Las Vegas Strip in Paradise, Nevada. It is owned and operated by Caesars Entertainment. It was originally opened by Michael Gaughan as the Barbary Coast on March 2, 1979. Several nearby resorts were opposed to its construction, partially due to concerns about increased traffic congestion. The property featured Victorian décor and later became part of Gaughan's company, Coast Casinos. The Barbary Coast would go on to add two popular restaurants, and a nightclub by Victor Drai.

Boyd Gaming acquired the Barbary Coast in 2004, when it purchased Coast Casinos. Boyd subsequently traded the Barbary Coast to Harrah's Entertainment, in exchange for other property on the Las Vegas Strip. Harrah's finalized its acquisition in February 2007, and briefly closed the Barbary Coast before reopening it on March 1, 2007, as Bill's Gamblin' Hall and Saloon. The property was named after company founder Bill Harrah.

Harrah's was later renamed as Caesars Entertainment, and the company announced plans in 2012 to extensively renovate Bill's. The property closed on February 4, 2013, and reopened as The Cromwell on April 21, 2014. The renovated property includes a restaurant by chef Giada De Laurentiis. It also features a rooftop pool and nightclub operated by Drai. In 2020, the Cromwell became an adults-only property. On June 11, 2026, the property was rebranded as The Vanderpump Hotel, in partnership with restaurateur and media personality Lisa Vanderpump.

== History ==
=== Barbary Coast (1979–2007) ===
The property was once the site of the Desert Villa motel, which opened in 1958, at the northeast corner of Las Vegas Boulevard and Flamingo Road. It was later renamed Empey's Desert Villa, after owner Phillip Empey. It was renamed again as the Times Square Motel in 1974, before closing later that year. In 1975, plans were approved for a shopping center to be built on the land, but the project failed to materialize, as the site had inadequate space for parking.

By December 1975, Michael Gaughan and others were planning to build the $10 million Barbary Coast hotel-casino on the 1.7-acre site occupied by the Times Square. The project was proposed by Gaughan and his father Jackie, along with partners Kenny Epstein and Frank Toti. However, several nearby casino resorts – Caesars Palace, the Dunes, the Flamingo Hilton, and the MGM Grand – were opposed to the project, stating that it would cause further traffic congestion at the intersection. A Hilton executive also said that the Barbary Coast would "change the entire character of the Strip." The Clark County Department of Building and Safety said it would also oppose the project, as the hotel's parking structure would be built under high-voltage power lines located in a right-of-way, posing a safety hazard. Michael Gaughan said that the existing motel structure was already located beneath the power lines, and that he had approval for the construction of the parking garage.

In February 1976, the Clark County Commission approved a variance for the start of construction, despite a recommendation of denial from the county planning commission. Groundbreaking took place on March 3, 1976, with Tito Tiberti and J. A. Tiberti Construction Company as the general contractor. Completion of the Barbary Coast was expected 18 months later. The power lines would be raised to allow for construction of the parking garage.

Within a week of the groundbreaking, the MGM and Flamingo filed a suit against the county commission, stating that it did not give the resorts adequate time to prepare arguments against the variance. The suit also claimed that Jackie Gaughan's application did not include necessary details about the project. In addition, the resorts accused commissioner Tom Wiesner of having a conflict of interest, which he denied. Wiesner owned a financial stake in the Marina hotel down the street, which was expected to benefit from the opening of the Barbary Coast. Later in 1976, Jackie Gaughan won an extension from the Clark County Commission, narrowly granting him another year to begin construction while the project faced legal challenges from opponents.

==== Operation ====
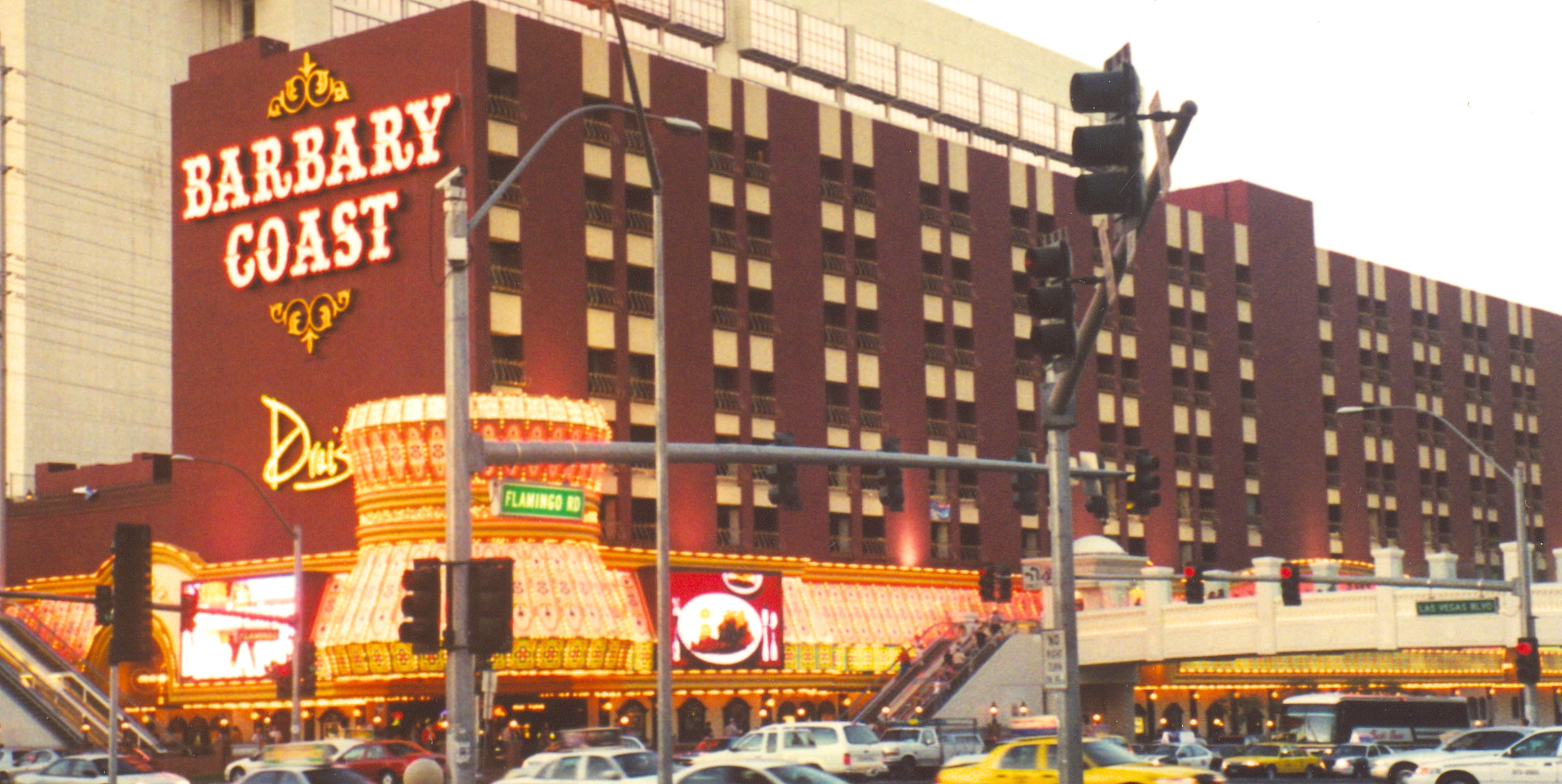
Barbary Coast in 2000

The eight-story Barbary Coast was eventually built, at a cost of $13 million. It was opened by Michael Gaughan on March 2, 1979. It was built on land that was owned by Empey Enterprises, which leased the site to the hotel-casino. The Barbary Coast saw significant success, particularly among local residents, and Michael Gaughan later started his own gaming company, Coast Casinos. The property was named after the "Barbary Coast" term which was once used to refer to the North African coastal regions. Gaughan had the building designed to eventually accommodate four additional floors, although such plans never materialized, as he found the property to be successful enough as-is.

When the MGM Grand caught on fire in November 1980, the Barbary Coast was closed to customers by management, allowing the property to be used as an evacuation center for MGM guests. The two properties were located across the street from each other. The closure lasted three hours, during which Gaughan gave away free food to fire survivors. The closure cost him up to $20,000.

In 1990, a federal court issued a preliminary injunction and ordered the Barbary Coast and Michael Gaughan to negotiate a new contract with the Culinary Workers Union, after the expiration of the previous contract a year earlier. A federal judge determined there was reasonable cause to believe that management had threatened employees who supported the union. In 1991, the National Labor Relations Board (NLRB) alleged that Gaughan and the resort violated the injunction. Two years later, the NLRB alleged that the Barbary Coast had engaged in dozens of violations relating to the National Labor Relations Act of 1935. Among the allegations was that the property terminated workers' pension and health plans, and withheld salary raises. Barbary Coast workers voted for a new contract later in 1993.

By 1996, the Barbary Coast was worth $60–70 million. Later in the year, Hilton Hotels Corporation began discussions to purchase the Barbary Coast, although this did not go through. Robert L. Johnson, a co-founder of BET and a Hilton board member, considered buying the Barbary Coast a few years later. He wanted to focus less on gaming and more on entertainment, with live music programs to be broadcast from the property. Gaughan was willing to sell the Barbary Coast for $100 million, but Johnson offered only $65 million. Johnson ultimately decided that the Barbary Coast was too small for his plans, which would have included the addition of a theater.

As of 2002, the Barbary Coast had 800 employees. An employee parking lot was located just east of the Barbary Coast, on 2.5 acres. The casino had been leasing the property from Nevada Power Company, which put the site up for sale that year. Coast Casinos purchased the land for $20.7 million in 2003, and continued using it for employee parking.

The Barbary Coast had a modest celebration for its 25th anniversary, serving free cake and champagne. The property had seen few renovations up to that time, such as a recent remodeling of its rooms which added new mirrors, paintings, and wallpaper. The small property had retained its success for more than 20 years, and was particularly popular among a regular clientele of repeat tourists. It did not compete with newer megaresorts that had opened nearby in recent years.

Boyd Gaming acquired Coast Casinos and the Barbary Coast in July 2004. A year later, Boyd purchased the land underneath the hotel-casino from Empey Enterprises, at a cost of $15.7 million. Despite the small size of the 1.8-acre plot, the property was one of the most valuable sites on the Las Vegas Strip, due to its location at an intersection sometimes known as the Four Corners. The purchase gave Boyd a wider range of future possibilities for the site, although there were no immediate plans for redevelopment.

A month after the purchase, Bill Boyd said that the property would be ideal for a high-rise project. He was also open to the idea of selling or trading the Barbary Coast to Harrah's Entertainment, which owned a multitude of nearby resorts. In mid-2006, the two companies began negotiations about a trade. Harrah's had picked up options to purchase the former site of the Westward Ho hotel-casino, which was located on the Strip, adjacent to Boyd's future Echelon Place project. The two companies eventually agreed to a trade, with the Barbary Coast and its 4.3 acres going to Harrah's, giving the company a contiguous ownership of the center Strip.

=== Bill's Gamblin' Hall and Saloon (2007–2013) ===
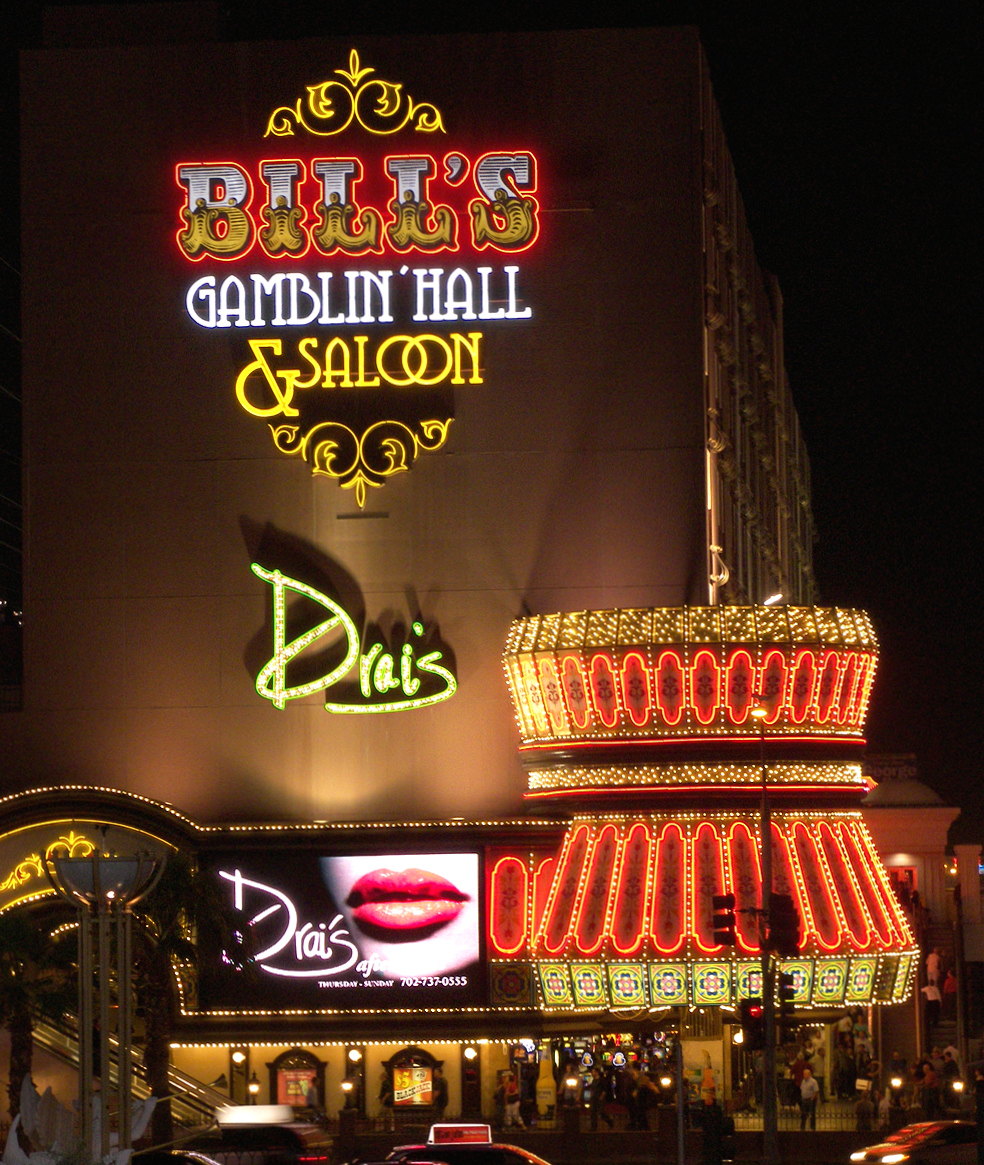
Bill's Gamblin' Hall and Saloon in 2007

Harrah's acquisition of the Barbary Coast was finalized in February 2007, and the property was placed under the same management team as the Imperial Palace, a nearby property owned by Harrah's. The company temporarily closed the Barbary Coast's casino portion on February 27, 2007, around 2:00 a.m. New management replaced casino chips and rearranged table games during the closure.

A low-key reopening took place at 2:00 p.m. on March 1, 2007, with the entire property renamed as Bill's Gamblin' Hall and Saloon, in honor of company founder Bill Harrah. Management expected Bill's to eventually become part of Harrah's master plan for the area. Industry experts strongly believed that Harrah's would eventually demolish Bill's for redevelopment.

Harrah's was renamed as Caesars Entertainment a few years after the opening of Bill's. In October 2012, Caesars announced plans to renovate Bill's and to add a rooftop pool and nightclub, overlooking the Las Vegas Strip. Victor Drai, who operated a restaurant and nightclub at Bill's, would also operate the new rooftop attraction. Caesars CEO Gary Loveman said, "Due to some remarkable foresight, the top of this building was built structurally so it can hold something very heavy on top without additional structural work."

In November 2012, Caesars secured $187 million to finance its renovation plans, which would require the closing of Bill's. Prior to its closure, the property had been known for its folksy atmosphere and cheap amenities.

=== The Cromwell (2014–2026) ===
Bill's closed on February 4, 2013, for a year-long renovation. The property would be renamed and converted into a luxury boutique hotel. A month after the closure, Caesars announced that the property would reopen under the name Gansevoort Las Vegas, through a partnership with the New York-based Gansevoort Hotel Group. The project would fulfill Gansevoort's long-time goal of entering the Las Vegas market. Caesars would operate the property, and Gansevoort would provide design and marketing help. W.A. Richardson Builders served as the general contractor.

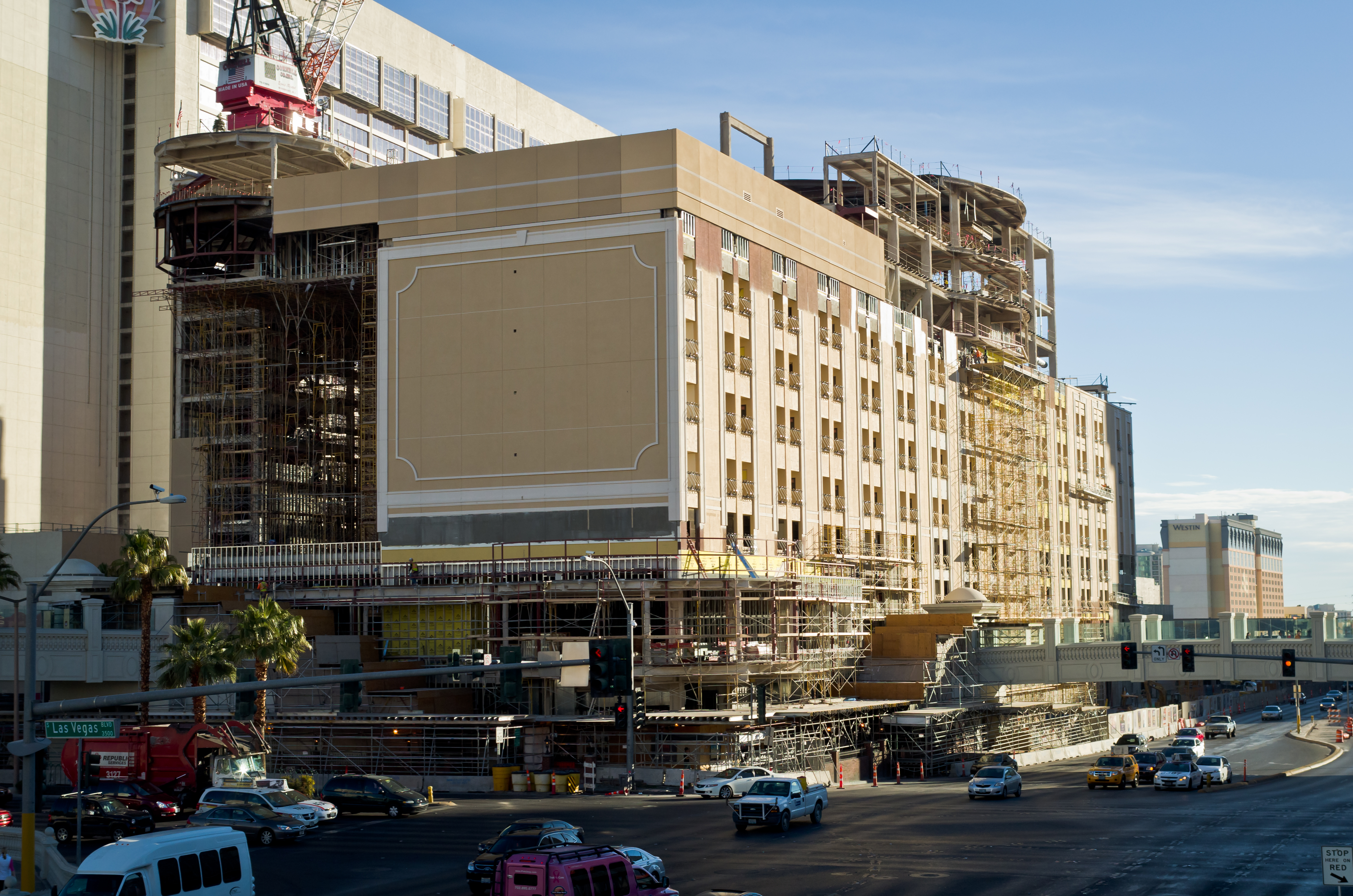
The Cromwell during construction, January 2014

The entire building was gutted, and three floors were added atop the hotel structure for Drai's new nightclub. Drai had long believed that the rooftop had untapped potential, although power lines had prevented any additional floors from being added. When Caesars later moved the power lines underground, Drai devised the idea for a rooftop club. A support building had to be constructed just north of the original hotel structure, providing additional bracing to the new club. A new employee parking garage was constructed on the property just east of the hotel. A spiral ramp on the hotel's east side, leading into the guest parking garage, was demolished. A new ramp was constructed on the property's northern side.

In October 2013, Caesars ended its partnership with Gansevoort, after an investor with the latter company was reputed to have ties with organized crime in Russia. Caesars would proceed with the project on its own, and without the Gansevoort name. Caesars announced in January 2014 that the renovated property would instead open as The Cromwell. The name "Cromwell" is sometimes associated with upper class, and the property is reportedly named after the Cromwell Current. However, the resort would also share its name with Oliver Cromwell, a controversial English ruler during the 17th century. Gaughan criticized the name: "If you are Irish, that's a slap in the face. Oliver Cromwell was not a very nice guy." Caesars declined to explain how the name was chosen.

The Cromwell had a low-key opening on April 21, 2014; the casino and a bar began operations, and some hotel rooms were available to invited guests. The entire resort, including nightclubs and the Giada restaurant, opened on May 21, 2014.

In March 2020, all Las Vegas casinos were ordered closed due to the COVID-19 pandemic in Nevada. Even as other casinos were allowed to resume operations, the Cromwell remained closed indefinitely. In August 2020, CBS reality dating show Love Island began filming its second season at the Cromwell, relocated from Fiji due to the pandemic. The Cromwell reopened on October 29, 2020, as an adults-only property with the exception of its Giada restaurant. The Cromwell was already an adult-oriented property, unlike other Las Vegas resorts that include family entertainment. It was the last resort on the Las Vegas Strip to reopen.

=== The Vanderpump (2026–present) ===
In March 2025, Caesars announced its partnership with restaurateur and television personality Lisa Vanderpump, who oversees restaurants at several of its properties. Under the partnership, the Cromwell was rebranded as The Vanderpump Hotel, marking her first hotel project. The property remained open during renovation that concluded in early 2026. The Vanderpump Hotel held its grand opening on June 11, 2026. The interior remodel was designed by Vanderpump herself along with Nick Alain through their design company. Vanderpump also opened the cocktail lounge Gigolo (named after her late dog) and The Bar at The Vanderpump Hotel, once again designed by her.

In its first three months of operations, The Vanderpump Hotel achieved its first AAA Four Diamond designation.

== Features ==
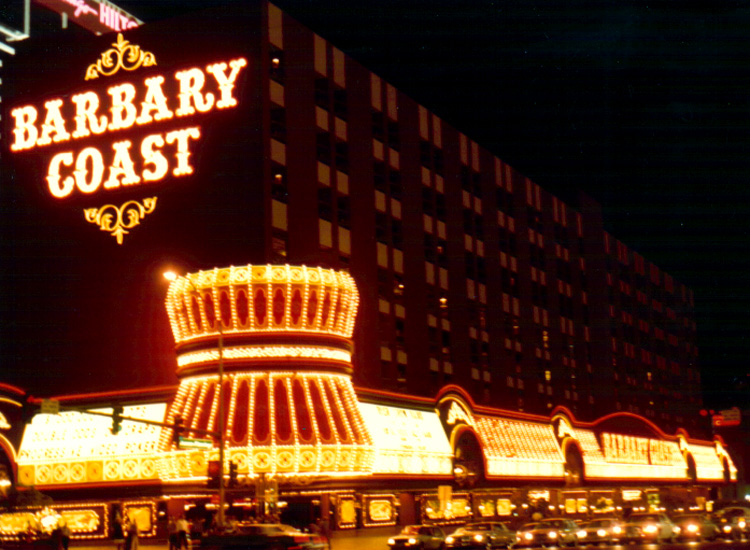
Barbary Coast façade in 1983

When it originally opened, the Barbary Coast had 150 rooms. Due to the small size of the site, the building included four floors of parking, located above the first-floor casino and beneath the hotel floors. An additional 50 hotel rooms were added in 1983, by converting one floor of parking. By 1987, the casino had one of Las Vegas' most popular sportsbooks. By 1999, the casino measured 30,000 sq ft (2,800 m^{2}).

The Barbary Coast featured Victorian décor and stained glass murals, including one known as Garden of Earthly Delights, measuring 30 feet long by 5 feet high. It was added on the casino floor in 1984, and required 10 artists who worked more than 10,000 hours to create it. The mural was later moved to the Suncoast Hotel and Casino.

The west side of the Barbary Coast building featured a neon sign designed by Brian "Buzz" Leming, an employee of YESCO. Leming said it was his favorite of all the casino signs he had designed. Neon lettering from the Barbary Coast was eventually relocated to the city's Neon Museum. The Barbary Coast/Bill's façade also featured a large stained-glass structure, which was removed during the Cromwell conversion and auctioned.

The Cromwell has a 40,010 sq ft (3,717 m^{2}) casino, and 188 hotel rooms. The property features classic and modern French designs. It was meant to resemble Parisian apartments, and its design was inspired by the Hôtel Costes in Paris. In 2015, the Cromwell launched a mobile app which hotel guests could use to unlock their rooms, rather than using keys. Two years later, the Cromwell opened a new 50-seat sportsbook.

=== Restaurants ===
The Barbary Coast had a popular restaurant known as Michael's, which won several awards, and was named after Gaughan. In addition, the casino featured the Victorian Room coffee shop.

In 1997, the Barbary Coast added an upscale French restaurant known as Drai's, operated by Victor Drai. It operated in the casino's basement, replacing a McDonald's restaurant. Like Michael's, Drai's would also go on to win awards. As part of the Harrah's ownership change, Michael's was relocated in 2007, to Gaughan's newly purchased South Point resort. The property opened a new restaurant known as the Steakhouse at Bill's, which eventually closed in 2012.

Chef Giada De Laurentiis opened her first restaurant in June 2014, on the second floor of the Cromwell. The restaurant, named Giada, serves Italian food and seats 260 people.

=== Entertainment ===
In 1999, two years after its opening, Drai's would convert nightly into a club called Drai's After Hours, starting around 2:00 a.m. It featured live music and alcohol, and became a popular attraction for the property. Because of the restaurant's underground location, Drai had it designed like a club, stating that "the feeling was always more clubby than restaurant." The idea for an afterhours nightclub came when Drai agreed to let DJs perform in the restaurant after closing time, which led to immediate success.

As of 2004, most of the Barbary Coast's entertainment was free, including live music in its lounge. Among the notable performers was an Elvis impersonator named Big Elvis. The property also offered karaoke nights.

The Cromwell's rooftop nightclub, known as Drai's Beach Club & Night Club, opened in May 2014, with a lineup of DJs. The club reportedly cost $100 million. The 65,000 sq ft (6,000 m^{2}) venue is spread across two floors and includes several pools. It became popular for its live performances and hip-hop music. Aside from the rooftop venue, Drai's After Hours also resumed operations in the Cromwell's basement level. It occupies 13,000 sq ft (1,200 m^{2}).

== Gallery ==
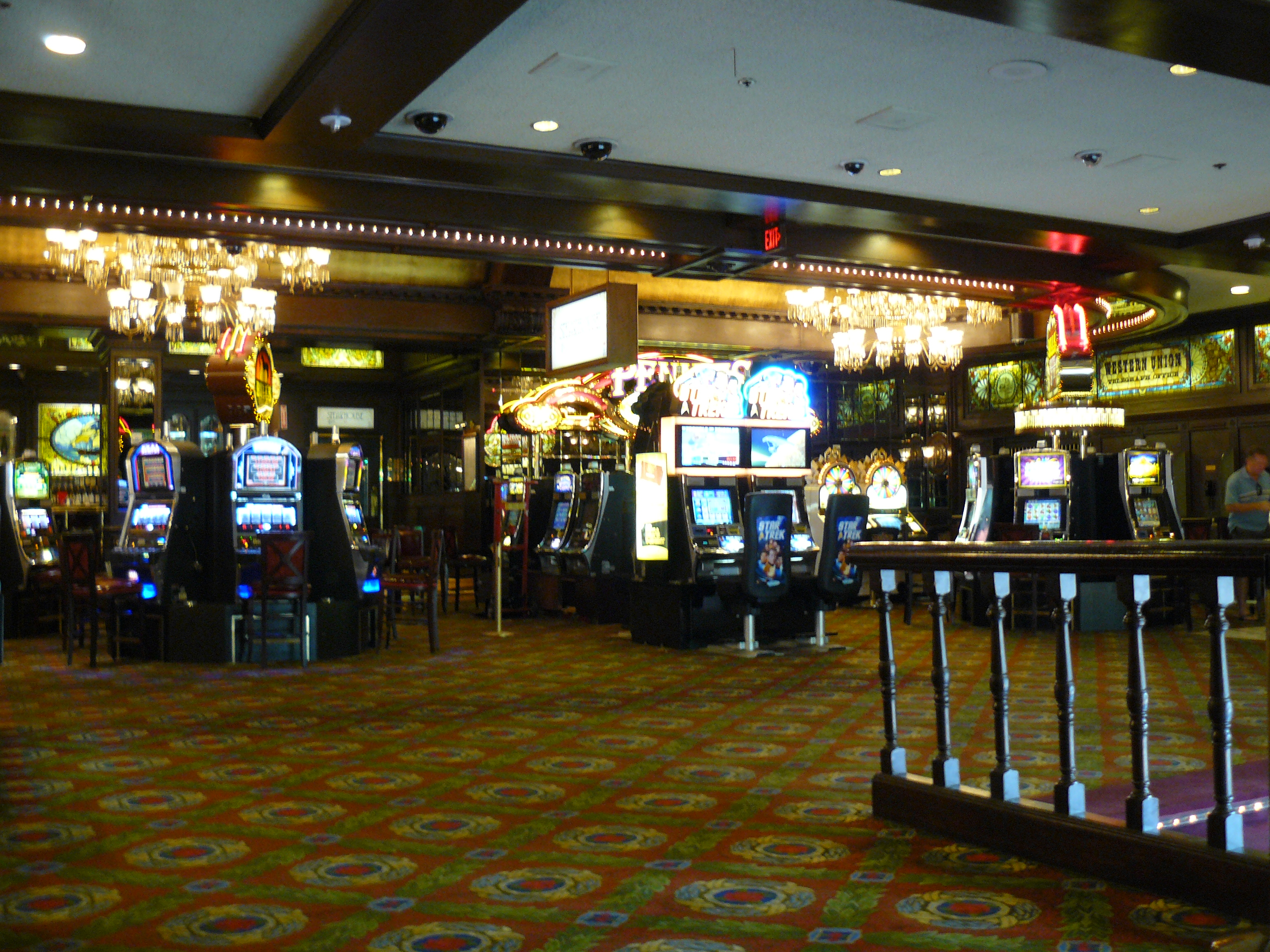
Casino floor at Bill's

Casino floor at Bill's

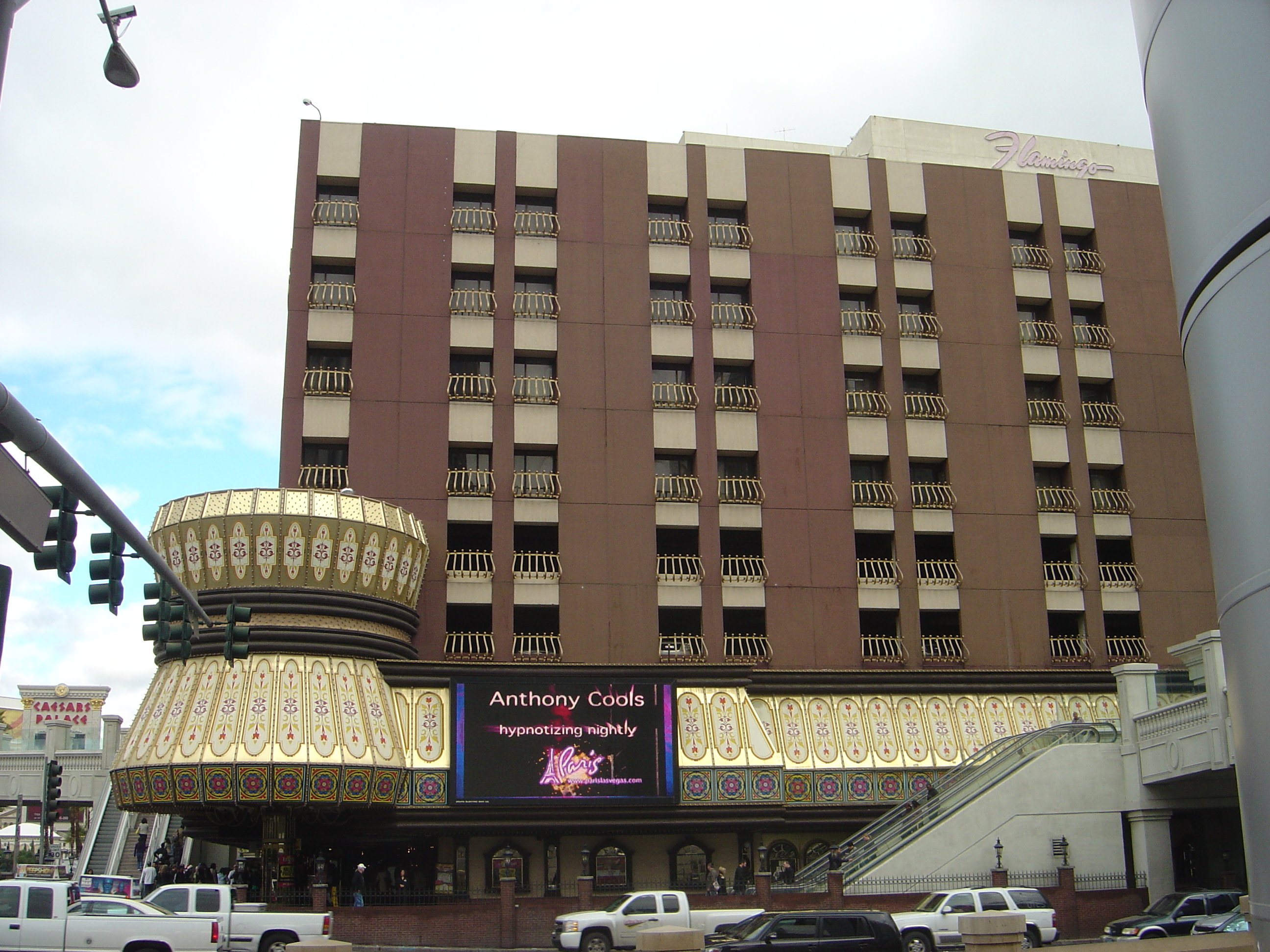
Bill's Gamblin' Hall and Saloon in 2010

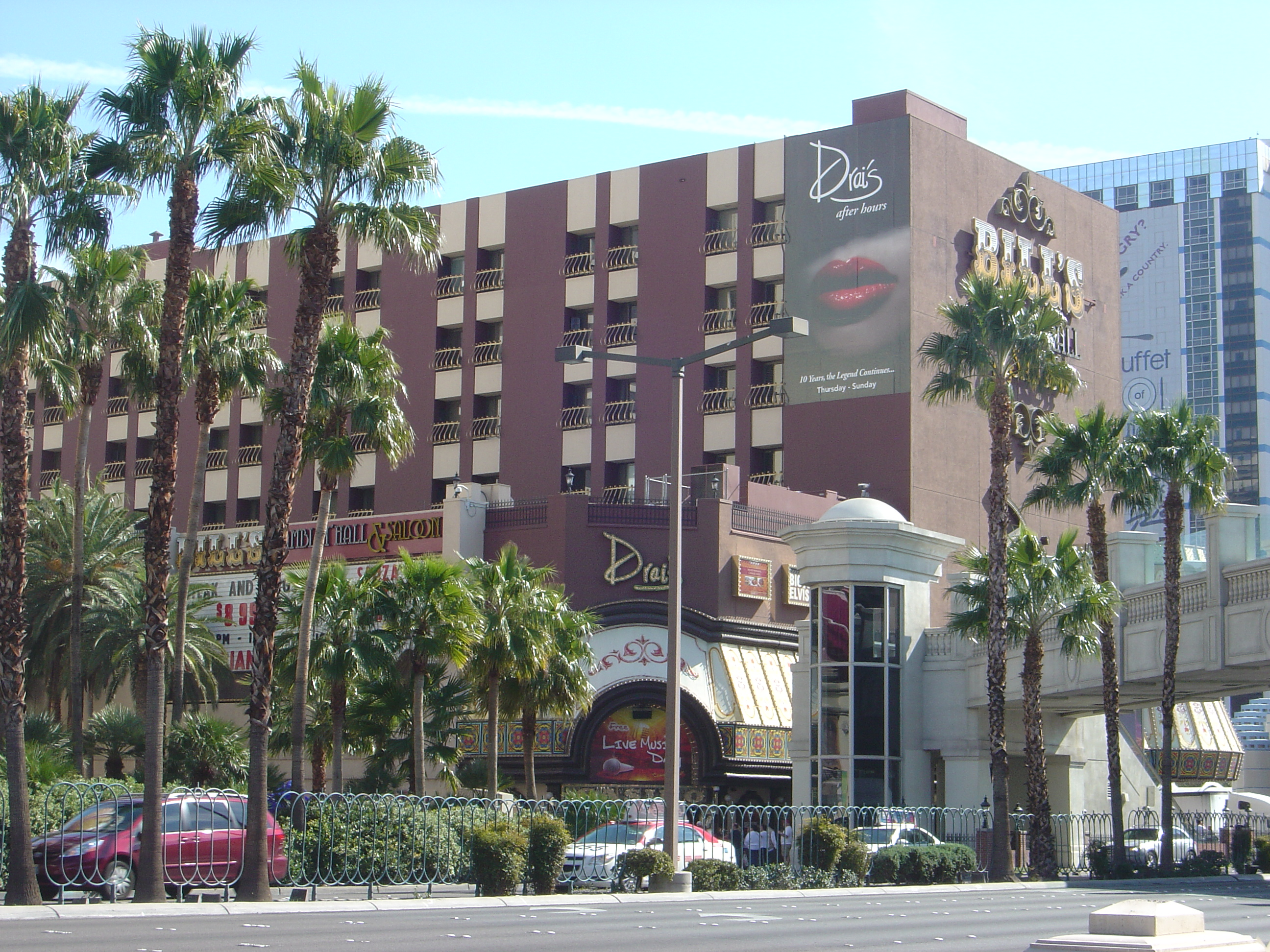
Bill's Gamblin' Hall and Saloon in 2011

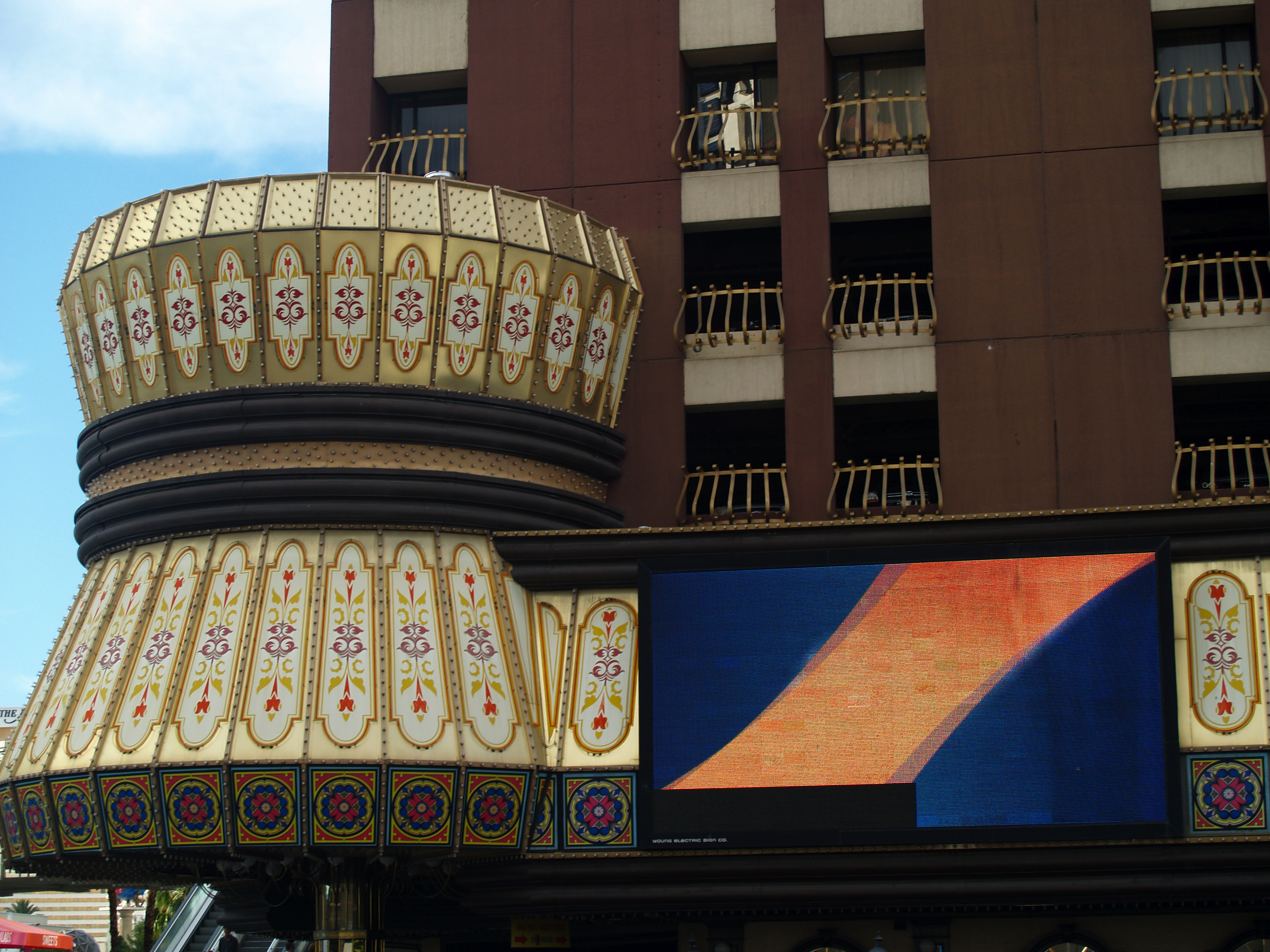
Bill's Gamblin' Hall and Saloon in 2012

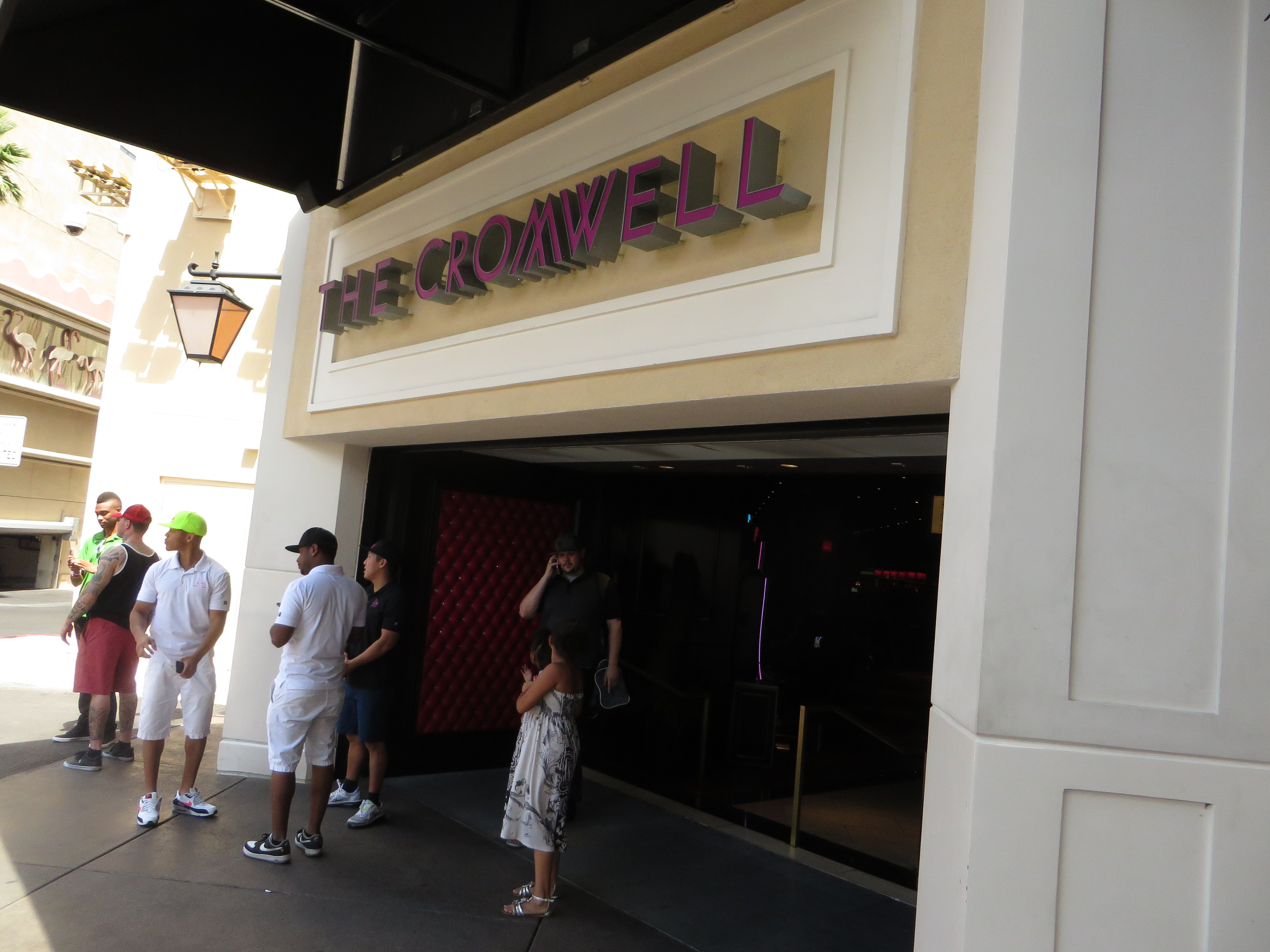
The Cromwell entrance in 2015

== See also ==
- List of casinos in Nevada
