= Michael Gaughan (businessman) =

Businessman

- Born: Michael John Gaughan; March 24, 1943 (age 82); Omaha, Nebraska, U.S.
- Occupation: Businessman
- Known for: South Point Hotel, Casino & Spa, Coast Casinos
- Children: Brendan Gaughan
- Parent: Jackie Gaughan (father)
- Website: www.southpointcasino.com

Michael John Gaughan (born March 24, 1943) is an American casino owner and operator in Las Vegas, Nevada, who is the owner of the South Point Hotel, Casino & Spa. He is the son of Jackie Gaughan and was the owner of a NASCAR race team, South Point Racing, for which his son, Brendan Gaughan, used to drive. The team was dissolved at the end of the 2007 season.

== Biography ==
Gaughan was born in Omaha, Nebraska in 1943. He won the 1966 Mint 400 race, and continued that interest with South Point Racing which he founded in 1999 and dissolved in 2007.

After many roles in casinos, including various ownership roles, Gaughan opened the Barbary Coast Hotel and Casino in March 1979 at a cost of $11.5 million. That casino, on 4.3 acres (1.7 ha) of land, became the foundation for Coast Casinos. He was instrumental in bringing the Professional Rodeo Cowboys Association (PRCA)'s year-end championship event, the National Finals Rodeo (NFR), to Las Vegas in 1985. He serves on the NFR committee and is a longtime sponsor of the NFR and PRCA. He is also a board member of the National Cowboy & Western Heritage Museum. In 2004, Gaughan sold Coast Casinos for $1.3 billion to Boyd Gaming. In July 2006, Boyd gaming announced that it was selling the South Coast to Gaughan for an estimated $576 million. The casino was built at a cost of $600 million.

== Honors ==
- In 2007, Gaughan was inducted into the PRCA's ProRodeo Hall of Fame.
- In 2009, Gaughan was inducted into the Gaming Hall of Fame.
- In 2017, Gaughan was inducted in the West Coast Stock Car Hall of Fame.
- Also in 2017, the ProRodeo Hall of Fame honored Gaughan with the Legend of ProRodeo award.
- In 2021, the Professional Bull Riders (PBR) honored Gaughan with the Jim Shoulders Lifetime Achievement Award.
- In 2023, Gaughan was awarded the Ben Johnson Memorial Award of the National Cowboy & Western Heritage Museum.

== Michael Gaughan Airport Slots ==
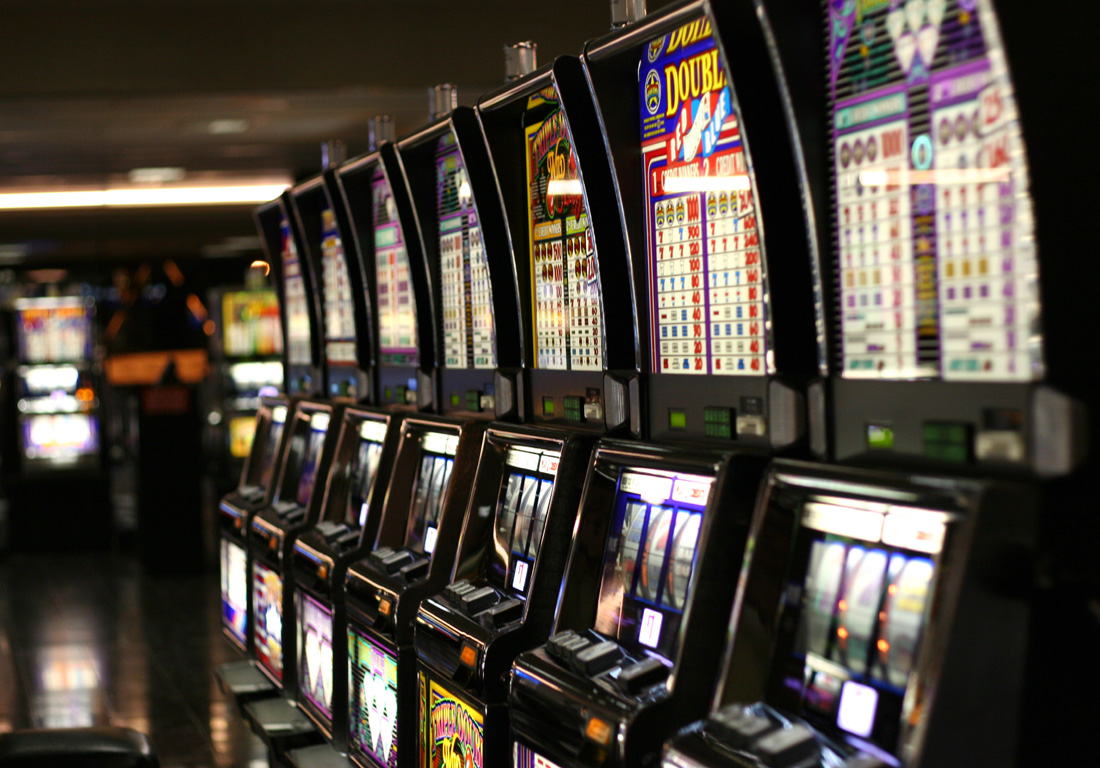
Row of slot machines inside Las Vegas airport

Gaughan has been granted the rights to operate slot concession at Harry Reid International Airport under the name Michael Gaughan Airport Slots, operating over 1,300 slot machines in all of the airport's terminals.

== Sources ==
- Las Vegas Review-Journal
- Las Vegas Sun
