= Brendan Gaughan =

American racing driver (born 1975)

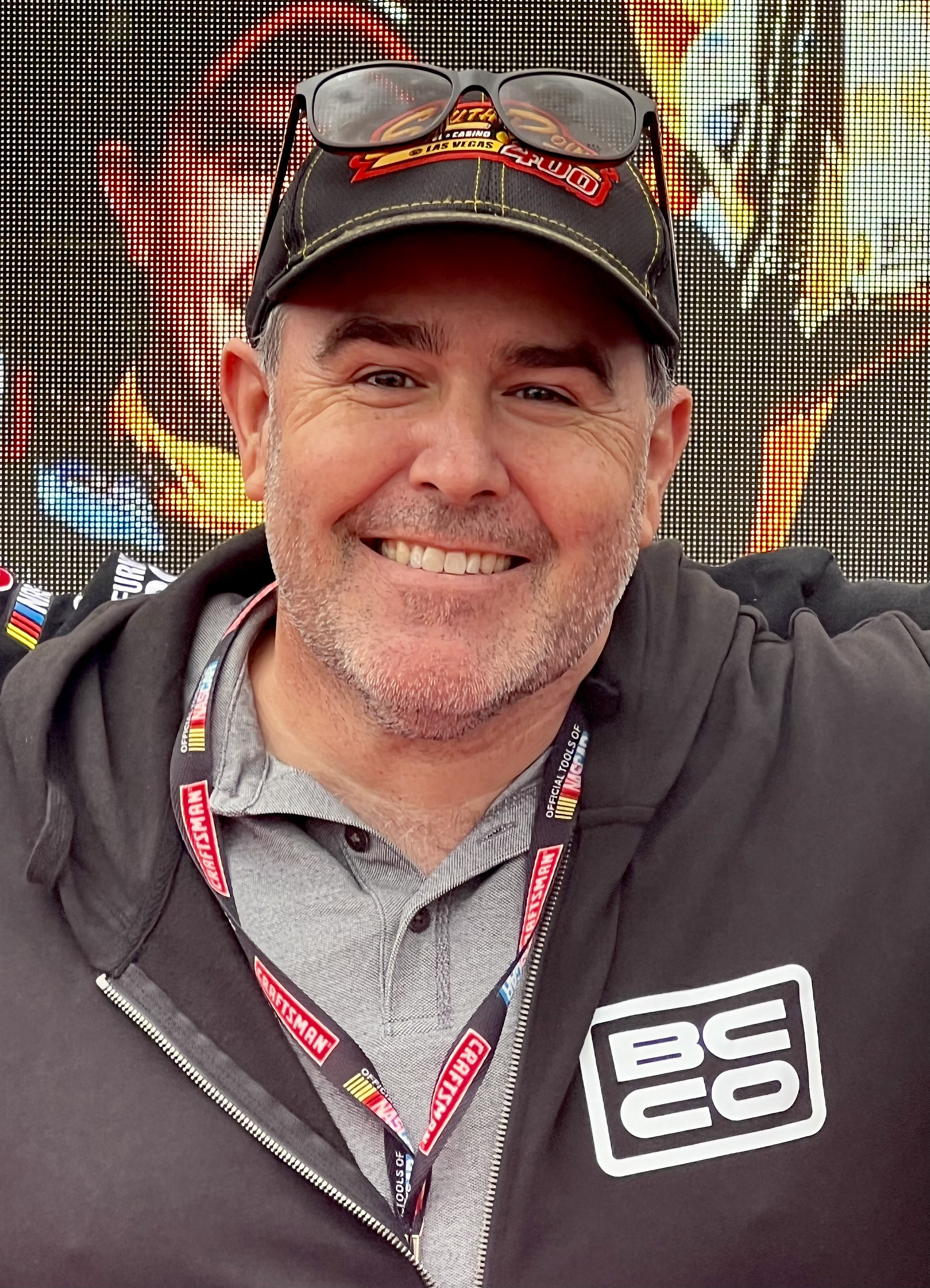
- Gaughan at Las Vegas Motor Speedway in 2024
- Born: William Brendan Gaughan; July 10, 1975 (age 51); Los Angeles, California, U.S.
- Achievements: 2019, 2025 Baja 1000 Class 1 winner 1995, 1996 SODA Class 13 champion 2000, 2001 NASCAR Winston West Series champion
- Awards: 2002 NASCAR Craftsman Truck Series Rookie of the Year; 2003 NASCAR Craftsman Truck Series Most Popular Driver; West Coast Stock Car Hall of Fame (2022)

NASCAR Cup Series career
- 67 races run over 9 years
- 2020 position: 35th
- Best finish: 28th (2004)
- First race: 2004 Daytona 500 (Daytona)
- Last race: 2020 YellaWood 500 (Talladega)
Wins	Top tens	Poles
0	8	0

NASCAR O'Reilly Auto Parts Series career
- 219 races run over 10 years
- 2018 position: 44th
- Best finish: 8th (2014)
- First race: 2001 Auto Club 300 (California)
- Last race: 2018 Drive for the Cure 200 (Charlotte Roval)
- First win: 2014 Gardner Denver 200 (Road America)
- Last win: 2014 VisitMyrtleBeach.com 300 (Kentucky)
Wins	Top tens	Poles
2	67	1

NASCAR FedEx Freight Truck Series career
- 218 races run over 15 years
- 2026 position: 67th
- Best finish: 4th (2003)
- First race: 1997 Carquest 420K (Las Vegas)
- Last race: 2026 Navy 250 (San Diego)
- First win: 2002 O'Reilly 400K (Texas)
- Last win: 2003 Silverado 350 (Texas)
Wins	Top tens	Poles
8	80	3
- Statistics up to date as of November 6, 2026.

William Brendan Gaughan (born July 10, 1975) is an American semi-retired professional racing driver who has competed in off-road and stock cars. He last competed part-time in the NASCAR Craftsman Truck Series, driving the No. 20 Chevrolet Silverado RST for McAnally–Hilgemann Racing. He is the grandson of Vegas gaming pioneer Jackie Gaughan, and son of Michael Gaughan, a hotel and casino magnate.

Gaughan began his career racing in off-road and he rose through the ranks from pickup trucks to the professional two-wheel-drive Trophy Truck class. In the late 1990s, he switched to pavement racing in a stock car. This led to a career in NASCAR racing. He began in the NASCAR Craftsman Truck Series, which was followed by the Busch and Cup Series during the 2000s. Gaughan competed full-time in the Xfinity Series in 2009–2010 and 2014–2017, followed by a part-time Cup schedule from 2017 to his final season in 2020, before returning to the Craftsman Truck Series in 2026.

== Personal life and education ==
Born in Los Angeles, California but a long-term resident of Las Vegas, Nevada, Gaughan attended Georgetown University and played collegiate basketball as a walk-on for the Hoyas with friend and former Philadelphia 76ers guard Allen Iverson. He is also the brother of Las Vegas gaming executive John Gaughan.

Gaughan earned All-Conference honors as a placekicker on Georgetown's NCAA Division I-AA football team. He was primarily a role player on the basketball team whose jobs were mostly practice related but did see action in 25 games.

A unique individual, he even sported cornrows during a race at Dover International Speedway during the 2005 Craftsman Truck Series season. On August 18, 2007, he married his wife Tatum, and on October 30, 2010, Gaughan and Tatum welcomed a baby boy, who they named Michael James. His second son William was born on October 11, 2012.

Gaughan founded City Lights Shine, a distillery, is involved in his family's South Point Casino business, and also owns New Wave Cleaning Solutions.

== Racing career ==
=== Off-road career ===
Gaughan competed in the Mickey Thompson Entertainment Group (MTEG) in the 1980s, where he had future fellow NASCAR driver Casey Mears as a teammate. He won his first race in a 1991 Southern Nevada Off-Road Enthusiasts (SNORE) event. He was the Class 10 SNORE champion in 1991, 1992, and 1993.

In 1995, Gaughan moved to SODA (Short-course Off-road Drivers Association) series driving a Dodge Ram for the Walker Evans team. He was the 1995 Class 13 champion. He raced in premiere two-wheel-drive trophy truck Class 8 in 1996 and 1997 but did not win either championship as Scott Taylor won both championships. He moved with most SODA drivers to Championship Off-Road Racing (CORR) at the end of 1997 and raced in the Pro-2 category through 1998 where he finished third behind champion Ricky Johnson and Taylor.

Gaughan's biggest wins came at Crandon International Off-Road Raceway. His multiple wins there solidified his reputation as one of the premier off-road racers at the time with his most memorable battle coming between himself and future NASCAR champion Jimmie Johnson in 1996. The two dueled throughout the race with Johnson having to come from behind after contact with Taylor. However, Johnson's truck succumbed to crash damage from a previous incident with Jimmie Crowder and Gaughan took his first win at Crandon in a pro category. He followed the win with a repeat performance the next year at Crandon, this time piloting a Chevrolet.

After his final full-time NASCAR season, Gaughan returned to desert racing in a Class 1 car. In 2019, he won the class at the Baja 1000. He added another class win at the 2025 Baja 1000.

=== NASCAR career ===
==== Early career ====
Gaughan made his NASCAR debut in a Truck Series race in 1997 at Las Vegas Motor Speedway. Driving the No. 20 Orleans Hotel & Casino-sponsored Dodge for Walker Evans, he qualified eighteenth and finished 24th. He ran two races in 1998 with the No. 20 team, but he failed to finish both races. He also attempted his first Busch race at Las Vegas, but he failed to qualify. In 1998, he was part of the Coca-Cola 500 at Twin Ring Motegi in Japan and was involved in a crash that also collected Bobby Hamilton.

Gaughan then decided to move to stock car racing. He ran in the Winston West Series in 1999, and was the 2000 and 2001 champion on the circuit. He attempted to qualify for a Busch Series race at Pikes Peak International Raceway in 2000, but failed to make the race. In 2001, he made his Busch Series debut at Fontana for Ed Whitaker but finished 41st. The next week, he attempted his first Winston Cup race at Las Vegas but failed to qualify. He also ran seven times in the Truck Series for Bill McAnally and TKO Motorsports, and had two top-five finishes.

==== 2002–2004 ====
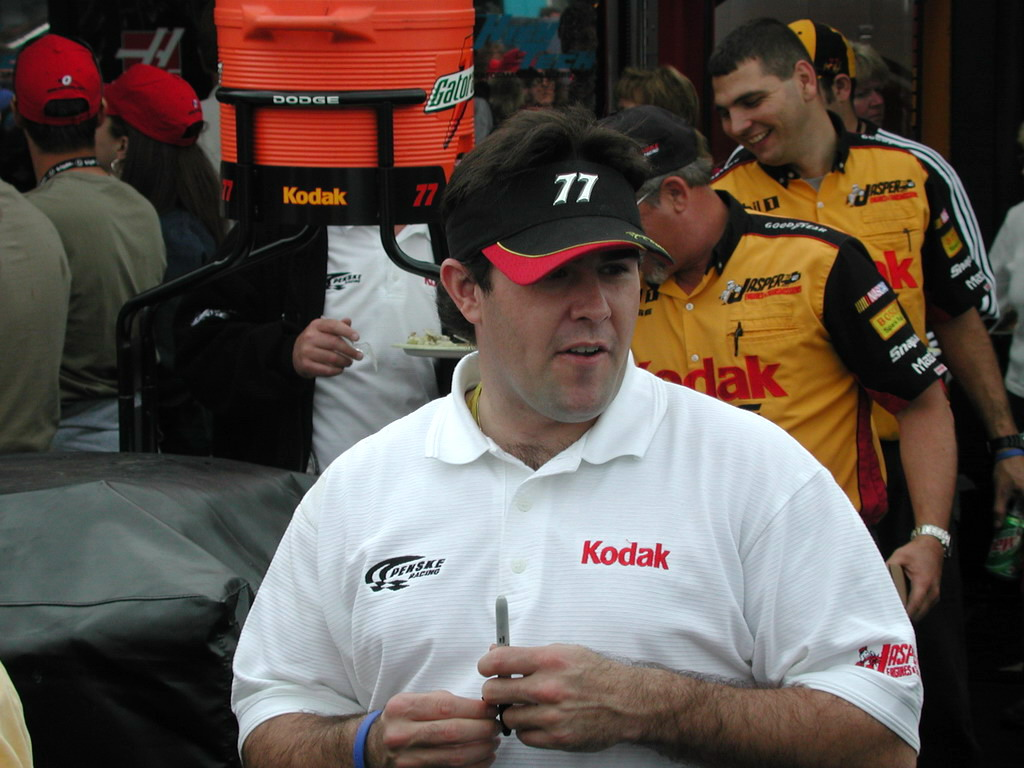
Gaughan in 2004

In 2002, Gaughan and his father fielded a team for himself in the Truck Series full-time. He drove the No. 62 NAPA Auto Parts-sponsored truck to two victories on his way to the Rookie of the Year title. In 2003, he drove the No. 62 Orleans-sponsored Dodge for his father Michael, and he won six times, including twice at Texas Motor Speedway, giving him four consecutive wins at the track. He also held the points lead for most of the season, but finished 4th in points after wrecking in the last race of the season with Marty Houston, a teammate of one of Gaughan's rivals for the championship, Ted Musgrave; the collision with Houston validated Gaughan's concerns that Ultra Motorsports had entered extra trucks to serve as roadblocks to help Musgrave, as Houston was one of the extra entries.

In 2004, Gaughan would bypass the Busch Series, to move up to the Nextel Cup Series, driving the No. 77 Eastman Kodak-sponsored Dodge for Penske-Jasper Racing. He finished second in the Rookie of the Year standings and 28th in the final points standings. He finished the season with four top-tens, including a career-best top-five finish at Talladega Superspeedway, where he had been in contention to win before Dale Earnhardt Jr. and several other drivers shuffled Gaughan back to fourth place. He did come close to a win at the Glen where he led a total of seven laps in the final 25 laps. He then spun out with nineteen laps to go and then broke a transmission, finishing 34th. He was replaced at the end of the season by Travis Kvapil, after team owner Roger Penske was not satisfied with Gaughan's progress in the sport.

==== 2005–2020 ====
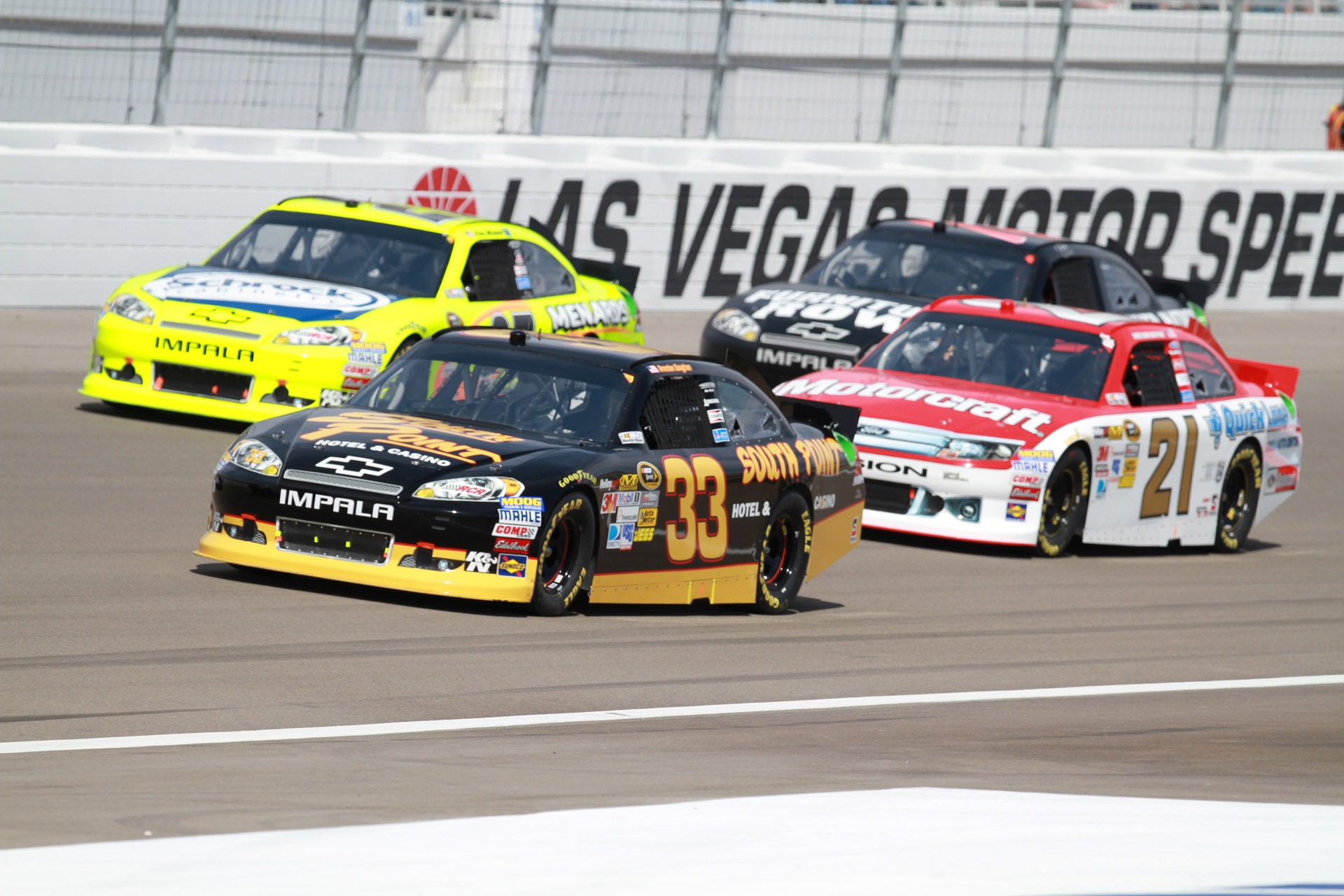
Gaughan during the 2012 Kobalt Tools 400

In 2005, Gaughan moved back to the Truck Series, behind the wheel of the No. 77 Dodge Ram. He finished nineteenth in the final points standings, with two top-five and seven top-ten finishes. Starting with the September 23 race at Las Vegas Motor Speedway, the team began sporting a new livery of the South Point Casino in which his father, Michael, is the owner.

In 2007, the South Point team switched to Chevrolet Silverados, where Gaughan returned to the manufacturer which he drove during his efforts in the AutoZone West championships. In 2008, South Point Racing was to merge with Wyler Racing into Wyler-Gaughan Racing, fielding the No. 60 and No. 77 Toyotas. But the deal fell through and SPR was forced to close, leaving Gaughan and 10–12 of his crew members without a team. Gaughan signed to the drive No. 10 Ford F-150 for Circle Bar Racing in the 2008 CTS season. He had five top-tens and finished fifteenth in points.

In 2009, Gaughan drove the No. 62 Chevy for Rusty Wallace Racing in the Nationwide Series. In 2010, he rejoined RWR, but this time in a Toyota, RWR switched manufacturers at the end of 2009. He also competed in the November Phoenix Cup race for TRG Motorsports where he finished 43rd after a first-lap crash. For 2011 he returned to the Camping World Truck Series to drive the No. 62 South Point Toyota for Germain Racing while Michael Annett replaced him at RWR. However, Gaughan was unhappy with the lagging performance of the team and left the team at the end of the season. In 2012, he joined Richard Childress Racing to compete in eighteen races between the Truck Series and Nationwide Series, as well as four Sprint Cup Series races in the No. 33 South Point Casino Chevrolet. Gaughan's performances in his limited opportunities were strong, posting four top-fives in eight truck races, and five top-tens in ten Nationwide Series races.

Gaughan returned to the Truck Series full-time in 2013, driving the No. 62 South Point Chevrolet for Childress with crew chief Shane Wilson. After 77 laps led, ten top-fives and thirteen top-tens in the 22 truck races that season, it was announced that Gaughan and Wilson would be moving up to the Nationwide Series full-time for RCR for the 2014 season.

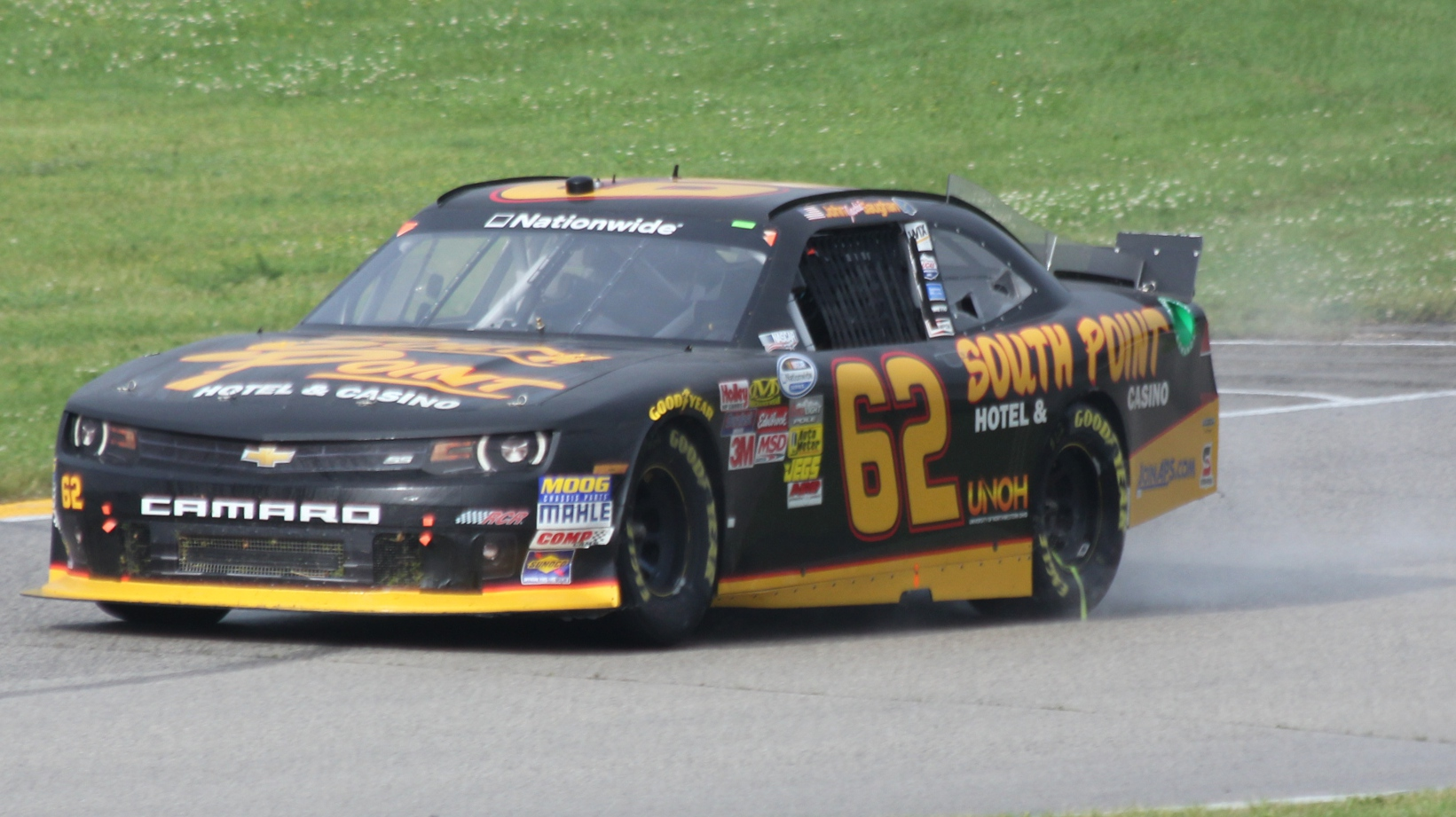
Gaughan racing in the rain at Road America for his first Nationwide series win (2014)

Gaughan won his first Nationwide Series race at Road America in June 2014 after Alex Tagliani ran out of gas before the final caution. After a battle with Chase Elliott, he passed Elliott on the final lap to win the race. He was very emotional about his win as he was running a car dedicated to his deceased grandfather John Jackie Gaughan. Following the emotional win, Gaughan continued his success racing up front consistently and by winning the VisitMyrtleBeach.com 300 at Kentucky.

In 2015, Gaughan competed full-time in the Xfinity Series once again for RCR. He also drove the No. 62 Sprint Cup car for Premium Motorsports in most of the series' races without RCR support. Gaughan would not reach victory lane as he did the season before, with his best finish being runner up in California. He would finish the Xfinity season with a career-high fourteen top-tens.

In the Cup Series, after a 28th place finish to begin the season in Atlanta, Gaughan failed to qualify with Premium Motorsports at Martinsville suffering his first DNQ of the year. He then failed to qualify for five of the next six after that, and blew a tire and crashed in his only start in this period, at Talladega. He qualified for the 2015 Autism Speaks 400 and again for Pocono, before suffering two more DNQs at Michigan and Sonoma. He did make the field at Daytona and finished 28th after suffering from a stuck throttle for more than half the race. Before Kentucky, he and Premium Motorsports agreed to part ways. The 2016 season would mark Gaughan's third season in the number 62 for RCR. Gaughan, on the strength of career highs in top-fives (four), top-tens (fifteen), and average finish (11.4), qualified for the Xfinity Series Chase. Gaughan made it into the Round of 8 with two top-tens in the first three races. The Round of 8 began with bad luck, as Gaughan spun through the grass in the first race of the Round of 8 at Kansas, leaving him below the cut line with two races left.

After speculation about retirement, Gaughan announced he would return to RCR's No. 62 in 2017. Gaughan also announced he would run his first Daytona 500 since 2004, driving for Beard Motorsports. He finished the 500 in eleventh place, earning him starts with Beard at the three remaining Cup Series restrictor-plate races.

Gaughan then had a dismal first quarter of the Xfinity season, with many mechanical failures and several instances of being swept up in accidents. Gaughan's average finish in Xfinity following Talladega was below 25th. Gaughan did return to the No. 75 Cup car at Talladega, finishing 27th. He returned to the No. 75 for the Coke Zero 400 at Daytona, where, despite being involved in a couple wrecks, was able to finish seventh. It was his first top-ten of the year, as well as his first top-ten and best Cup finish since finishing sixth at the season-ending Ford 400 at Homestead-Miami Speedway in 2004. After the 2017 Xfinity season, Gaughan announced it would be his final full season in NASCAR, though he intends to continue racing part-time for Beard at the Cup Series' superspeedways.

During the 2019 1000Bulbs.com 500 at Talladega, Gaughan ran as high as second and led for a split second before being collected in a wreck that sent his No. 62 car into a flip over Kurt Busch and Matt DiBenedetto. Gaughan finished 27th and was unharmed in the crash. On December 21, 2019, Gaughan announced that he would retire from racing after the 2020 season.

On February 9, 2020, Gaughan made the field at the Daytona 500 by posting the second fastest qualifying speed of all the non-charter teams (188.945 mph; 33rd overall). He finished seventh in the race, his best finish in the Daytona 500. Gaughan also achieved a top-ten finish at the Coke Zero Sugar 400. In his final NASCAR race, the YellaWood 500 at Talladega, he finished 35th after being collected in a Stage 2 wreck.

After his retirement, Gaughan became Beard Motorsports' vice president of racing operations.

==== 2026 ====
In 2026, Gaughan returned to racing in the Truck Series, driving the No. 20 truck for McAnally–Hilgemann Racing in the 2026 Navy 250. The race would be his first NASCAR start since 2020.

== In media ==
In 2011, Gaughan appeared as a spokesperson for the South Point Casino in an episode of the History Channel series Only in America with Larry the Cable Guy.

Gaughan was a guest analyst for the 2015 ARCA Racing Series race at Kentucky.

== Motorsports career results ==
=== Racing career summary ===
Season	Series	Team	Races	Wins	Top 5	Top 10	Points	Position
1997	NASCAR Craftsman Truck Series	Walker Evans Racing	1	0	0	0	91	110th
1998	NASCAR Winston West Series	Orleans Racing	5	0	2	2	625	24th
1998	NASCAR Craftsman Truck Series	Walker Evans Racing	2	0	0	0	131	83rd
1999	NASCAR Winston West Series	Orleans Racing	14	0	3	6	1742	13th
1999	NASCAR Craftsman Truck Series	Walker Evans Racing	2	0	0	0	158	74th
2000	ARCA Bondo/Mar-Hyde Series	Orleans Racing	1	0	0	1	185	97th
2000	NASCAR Winston West Series	Bill McAnally Racing	12	2	9	11	1956	**1st**
2000	NASCAR Craftsman Truck Series	Bill McAnally Racing	5	0	0	0	615	40th
2001	NASCAR Winston West Series	Bill McAnally Racing	14	6	10	11	2257	**1st**
2001	NASCAR Craftsman Truck Series	Bill McAnally Racing	3	0	1	1	946	31st
2001	NASCAR Craftsman Truck Series	TKO Motorsports	4	0	1	2	946	31st
2001	NASCAR Busch Series	Team Bristol Motorsports	1	0	0	0	0	153rd
2002	NASCAR Winston West Series	Orleans Racing	1	0	0	0	104	51st
2002	NASCAR Craftsman Truck Series	Orleans Racing	22	2	5	9	2893	11th
2003	NASCAR Craftsman Truck Series	Orleans Racing	25	6	14	18	3797	4th
2004	NASCAR Nextel Cup Series	Penske-Jasper Racing	36	0	1	4	3165	28th
2005	NASCAR Craftsman Truck Series	Orleans Racing	23	0	2	7	2564	19th
2006	NASCAR Craftsman Truck Series	Orleans Racing	25	0	4	5	2984	15th
2007	NASCAR Craftsman Truck Series	Orleans Racing	25	0	3	8	2874	11th
2008	NASCAR Craftsman Truck Series	Circle Bar Racing	25	0	2	5	2840	15th
2009	NASCAR Nationwide Series	Rusty Wallace Racing	35	0	3	8	3914	9th
2009	Rolex Sports Car Series - GT	The Racer's Group	1	0	1	1	32	54th
2010	NASCAR Nationwide Series	Rusty Wallace Racing	35	0	3	9	3767	11th
2010	NASCAR Sprint Cup Series	TRG Motorsports	1	0	0	0	34	75th
2011	NASCAR Camping World Truck Series	Germain Racing	25	0	1	8	713	12th
2011	Rolex Sports Car Series - GT	The Racer's Group	1	1	1	1	?	?
2011	24 Hours of Daytona	The Racer's Group	1	1	1	1	N/A	**1st**
2012	NASCAR Camping World Truck Series	Richard Childress Racing	8	0	4	4	0	NC†
2012	NASCAR Nationwide Series	Richard Childress Racing	10	0	3	5	0	NC†
2012	NASCAR Sprint Cup Series	Richard Childress Racing	4	0	0	0	50	47th
2013	NASCAR Camping World Truck Series	Richard Childress Racing	22	0	10	13	717	7th
2013	NASCAR Nationwide Series	Richard Childress Racing	3	0	0	0	0	NC†
2013	NASCAR Sprint Cup Series	Phoenix Racing	1	0	0	0	0	NC†
2014	NASCAR Nationwide Series	Richard Childress Racing	33	2	2	7	954	8th
2015	NASCAR Xfinity Series	Richard Childress Racing	33	0	3	14	1012	9th
2015	NASCAR Sprint Cup Series	Premium Motorsports	8	0	0	0	0	NC†
2016	NASCAR Xfinity Series	Richard Childress Racing	33	0	4	16	2161	12th
2016	IMSA SportsCar Championship - PC	BAR1 Motorsports	1	0	1	1	1	31st
2016	24 Hours of Daytona	BAR1 Motorsports	1	0	1	1	N/A	**3rd**
2017	NASCAR Xfinity Series	Richard Childress Racing	33	0	2	8	2153	10th
2017	Monster Energy NASCAR Cup Series	Beard Motorsports	4	0	0	1	0	NC†
2018	NASCAR K&N Pro Series West	Bill McAnally Racing	1	0	1	1	39	36th
2018	NASCAR Xfinity Series	Richard Childress Racing	3	0	0	0	71	44th
2018	Monster Energy NASCAR Cup Series	Beard Motorsports	4	0	0	0	0	NC†
2018	IMSA SportsCar Championship - P	BAR1 Motorsports	1	0	0	0	17	59th
2018	24 Hours of Daytona	BAR1 Motorsports	1	0	0	0	N/A	14th
2019	Monster Energy NASCAR Cup Series	Beard Motorsports	4	0	0	1	0	NC†
2020	NASCAR Cup Series	Beard Motorsports	5	0	0	2	78	35th
2026	NASCAR Craftsman Truck Series	McAnally-Hilgemann Racing	1	0	0	0	21*	55th*

^{†} As Gaughan was a guest driver, he was ineligible for championship points.

=== NASCAR ===
(key) (Bold – Pole position awarded by qualifying time. Italics – Pole position earned by points standings or practice time. * – Most laps led.)

==== Cup Series ====
NASCAR Cup Series results
Year	Team	No.	Make	1	2	3	4	5	6	7	8	9	10	11	12	13	14	15	16	17	18	19	20	21	22	23	24	25	26	27	28	29	30	31	32	33	34	35	36	NCSC	Pts	Ref
2001	Orleans Racing	62	Chevy	DAY	CAR	LVS; DNQ	ATL	DAR	BRI	TEX	MAR	TAL	CAL	RCH	CLT	DOV	MCH	POC	SON	DAY	CHI	NHA	POC	IND	GLN	MCH	BRI	DAR	RCH	DOV	KAN	CLT	MAR	TAL	PHO	CAR	HOM	ATL	NHA	NA	–	
2002	Orleans Racing	62	Dodge	DAY	CAR	LVS	ATL	DAR	BRI	TEX	MAR	TAL	CAL; DNQ	RCH	CLT	DOV	POC	MCH	SON	DAY	CHI	NHA	POC	IND	GLN	MCH	BRI	DAR	RCH	NHA	DOV	KAN	TAL	CLT	MAR	ATL	CAR	PHO	HOM	NA	–	
2004	Penske-Jasper Racing	77	Dodge	DAY; 19	CAR; 20	LVS; 22	ATL; 33	DAR; 27	BRI; 20	TEX; 38	MAR; 17	TAL; 13	CAL; 6	RCH; 34	CLT; 33	DOV; 27	POC; 39	MCH; 16	SON; 26	DAY; 36	CHI; 30	NHA; 22	POC; 28	IND; 35	GLN; 34	MCH; 33	BRI; 35	CAL; 42	RCH; 27	NHA; 30	DOV; 22	TAL; 4	KAN; 10	CLT; 23	MAR; 34	ATL; 18	PHO; 30	DAR; 27	HOM; 6	28th	3165	
2010	TRG Motorsports	71	Chevy	DAY	CAL	LVS	ATL	BRI	MAR	PHO	TEX	TAL	RCH	DAR	DOV	CLT	POC	MCH	SON	NHA	DAY	CHI	IND	POC	GLN	MCH	BRI	ATL	RCH	NHA	DOV	KAN	CAL	CLT	MAR	TAL	TEX	PHO; 43	HOM	75th	34	
2012	Richard Childress Racing	33	Chevy	DAY	PHO; 27	LVS; 34	BRI; 22	CAL; 43	MAR	TEX	KAN	RCH	TAL	DAR	CLT	DOV	POC	MCH	SON	KEN	DAY	NHA	IND	POC	GLN	MCH	BRI	ATL	RCH	CHI	NHA	DOV	TAL	CLT	KAN	MAR	TEX	PHO	HOM	47th	50	
2013	Phoenix Racing	51	Chevy	DAY	PHO	LVS	BRI	CAL	MAR	TEX	KAN	RCH	TAL	DAR	CLT	DOV	POC	MCH	SON	KEN	DAY	NHA	IND	POC	GLN	MCH; 33	BRI	ATL	RCH	CHI	NHA	DOV	KAN	CLT	TAL	MAR	TEX	PHO	HOM	70th	0^{1}	
2015	Premium Motorsports	62	Chevy	DAY	ATL; 28	LVS; 38	PHO; 37	CAL; 41	MAR; DNQ	TEX; DNQ	BRI; DNQ	RCH; DNQ	TAL; 40	KAN; DNQ	CLT; DNQ	DOV; 34	POC; 40	MCH; DNQ	SON; DNQ	DAY; 28	KEN	NHA	IND	POC	GLN	MCH	BRI	DAR	RCH	CHI	NHA	DOV	CLT	KAN	TAL	MAR	TEX	PHO	HOM	64th	0^{1}	
2017	Beard Motorsports	75	Chevy	DAY; 11	ATL	LVS	PHO	CAL	MAR	TEX	BRI	RCH	TAL; 26	KAN	CLT	DOV	POC	MCH	SON	DAY; 7	KEN	NHA	IND	POC	GLN	MCH	BRI	DAR	RCH	CHI	NHA	DOV	CLT	TAL; 19	KAN	MAR	TEX	PHO	HOM	49th	0^{1}	
2018	Beard Motorsports	62	Chevy	DAY; 28	ATL	LVS	PHO	CAL	MAR	TEX	BRI	RCH	TAL; 22	DOV	KAN	CLT	POC	MCH	SON	CHI	DAY; 12	KEN	NHA	POC	GLN	MCH	BRI	DAR	IND	LVS	RCH	ROV	DOV	TAL; 12	KAN	MAR	TEX	PHO	HOM	51st	0^{1}	
2019	Beard Motorsports	62	Chevy	DAY; 23	ATL	LVS	PHO	CAL	MAR	TEX	BRI	RCH	TAL; 8	DOV	KAN	CLT	POC	MCH	SON	CHI	DAY; 20	KEN	NHA	POC	GLN	MCH	BRI	DAR	IND	LVS	RCH	ROV	DOV	TAL; 27	KAN	MAR	TEX	PHO	HOM	42nd	0^{1}	
2020	Beard Motorsports	62	Chevy	DAY; 7	LVS	CAL	PHO	DAR	DAR	CLT	CLT	BRI	ATL	MAR	HOM	TAL; 21	POC	POC	IND	KEN	TEX	KAN	NHA	MCH	MCH	DRC; 39	DOV	DOV	DAY; 8	DAR	RCH	BRI	LVS	TAL; 35	ROV	KAN	TEX	MAR	PHO	35th	78	

===== Daytona 500 =====
Year	Team	Manufacturer	Start	Finish
2004	Penske-Jasper Racing	Dodge	17	19
2017	Beard Motorsports	Chevrolet	39	11
2018	Beard Motorsports	Chevrolet	25	28
2019	Beard Motorsports	Chevrolet	30	23
2020	Beard Motorsports	Chevrolet	39	7

==== Xfinity Series ====
NASCAR Xfinity Series results
Year	Team	No.	Make	1	2	3	4	5	6	7	8	9	10	11	12	13	14	15	16	17	18	19	20	21	22	23	24	25	26	27	28	29	30	31	32	33	34	35	NXSC	Pts	Ref
1998	BACE Motorsports	31	Chevy	DAY	CAR	LVS; DNQ	NSV	DAR	BRI	TEX	HCY	TAL	NHA	NZH	CLT	DOV	RCH	PPR	GLN	MLW	MYB	CAL	SBO	IRP	MCH	BRI	DAR	RCH	DOV	CLT	GTY	CAR	ATL	HOM					NA	–	
2000	Orleans Racing	16	Chevy	DAY	CAR	LVS	ATL	DAR	BRI	TEX	NSV	TAL	CAL	RCH	NHA	CLT	DOV	SBO	MYB	GLN	MLW	NZH	PPR; DNQ	GTY	IRP	MCH	BRI	DAR	RCH	DOV	CLT	CAR	MEM	PHO	HOM				NA	–	
2001	Team Bristol Motorsports	07	Chevy	DAY	CAR	LVS	ATL	DAR	BRI	TEX	NSH	TAL	CAL; 41	RCH	NHA	NZH	CLT	DOV	KEN	MLW	GLN	CHI	GTY	PPR	IRP	MCH	BRI	DAR	RCH	DOV	KAN	CHA	MEM	PHO	CAR	HOM			153rd	0	
2009	Rusty Wallace Racing	62	Chevy	DAY; 15	CAL; 9	LVS; 7	**BRI**; 21	TEX; 37	NSH; 17	PHO; 7	TAL; 38	RCH; 26	DAR; 19	CLT; 2	DOV; 12	NSH; 24	KEN; 4	MLW; 13	NHA; 21	DAY; 17	CHI; 13	GTY; 31	IRP; 12	IOW; 25	GLN; 22	MCH; 29	BRI; 19	CGV; 9	ATL; 31	RCH; 21	DOV; 19	KAN; 29	CAL; 7	CLT; 15	MEM; 5	TEX; 16	PHO; 19	HOM; 11	9th	3914	
2010	Rusty Wallace Racing	62	Toyota	DAY; 30	CAL; 24	LVS; 13	BRI; 33	NSH; 10	PHO; 4	TEX; 21	TAL; 27	RCH; 9	DAR; 33	DOV; 13	CLT; 32	NSH; 13	KEN; 4	ROA; 3	NHA; 10	DAY; 29	CHI; 16	GTY; 17	IRP; 6	IOW; 31	GLN; 30	MCH; 32	BRI; 21	CGV; 27	ATL; 16	RCH; 17	DOV; 16	KAN; 9	CAL; 32	CLT; 11	GTY; 26	TEX; 17	PHO; 27	HOM; 8	11th	3767	
2012	Richard Childress Racing	33	Chevy	DAY	PHO	LVS; 5	BRI	CAL; 10	TEX	RCH	TAL	DAR; 26	IOW; 10	CLT	DOV	MCH	ROA	KEN	DAY	NHA	CHI; 28	IND	IOW; 14	GLN	CGV; 11	BRI	ATL	RCH	CHI	KEN; 3	DOV	CLT	KAN	TEX	PHO; 26	HOM; 3			115th	0^{1}	
2013	Richard Childress Racing	21	Chevy	DAY	PHO	LVS; DNQ	BRI	CAL	TEX	RCH	TAL	DAR	CLT	DOV	IOW	MCH	ROA; 11	KEN	DAY	NHA	CHI	IND	IOW			BRI; 15	ATL	RCH	CHI	KEN	DOV	KAN	CLT	TEX	PHO	HOM			110th	0^{1}	
2013	Richard Childress Racing	33	Chevy																					GLN; 14	MOH														110th	0^{1}	
2014	Richard Childress Racing	62	Chevy	DAY; 6	PHO; 16	LVS; 16	BRI; 7	CAL; 15	TEX; 11	DAR; 22	RCH; 20	TAL; 34	IOW; 12	CLT; 17	DOV; 12	MCH; 22	ROA; 1	KEN; 6	DAY; 28	NHA; 16	CHI; 11	IND; 19	IOW; 11	GLN; 28	MOH; 20	BRI; 6	ATL; 14	RCH; 18	CHI; 13	KEN; 1	DOV; 28	KAN; 13	CLT; 16	TEX; 16	PHO; 8	HOM; 29			8th	954	
2015	Richard Childress Racing	62	Chevy	DAY; 29	ATL; 12	LVS; 6	PHO; 8	CAL; 2	TEX; 33	BRI; 9	RCH; 11	TAL; 39	IOW; 10	CLT; 18	DOV; 7	MCH; 12	CHI; 4	DAY; 25	KEN; 9	NHA; 11	IND; 13	IOW; 5	GLN; 10	MOH; 12	BRI; 10	ROA; 16	DAR; 13	RCH; 16	CHI; 10	KEN; 6	DOV; 16	CLT; 15	KAN; 10	TEX; 12	PHO; 12	HOM; 23			9th	1012	
2016	Richard Childress Racing	62	Chevy	DAY; 10	ATL; 13	LVS; 10	PHO; 13	CAL; 7	TEX; 12	BRI; 16	RCH; 7	TAL; 5	DOV; 15	CLT; 10	POC; 14	MCH; 18	IOW; 15	DAY; 5	KEN; 13	NHA; 9	IND; 16	IOW; 11	GLN; 8	MOH; 8	BRI; 5	ROA; 2	DAR; 16	RCH; 18	CHI; 8	KEN; 6	DOV; 9	CLT; 13	KAN; 31	TEX; 15	PHO; 35	HOM; 8			12th	2161	
2017	Richard Childress Racing	62	Chevy	DAY; 5	ATL; 13	LVS; 35	PHO; 27	CAL; 33	TEX; 19	BRI; 35	RCH; 35	TAL; 30	CLT; 9	DOV; 20	POC; 6	MCH; 14	IOW; 26	DAY; 9	KEN; 39	NHA; 17	IND; 13	IOW; 13	GLN; 9	MOH; 7	BRI; 30	ROA; 5	DAR; 13	RCH; 21	CHI; 13	KEN; 14	DOV; 10	CLT; 11	KAN; 13	TEX; 17	PHO; 32	HOM; 13			10th	2153	
2018	Richard Childress Racing	3	Chevy	DAY	ATL	LVS	PHO	CAL	TEX	BRI	RCH	TAL	DOV	CLT	POC	MCH	IOW	CHI	DAY	KEN	NHA	IOW	GLN	MOH; 12	BRI	ROA; 24	DAR	IND	LVS	RCH	ROV; 17	DOV	KAN	TEX	PHO	HOM			44th	71	

==== Craftsman Truck Series ====
NASCAR Craftsman Truck Series results
Year	Team	No.	Make	1	2	3	4	5	6	7	8	9	10	11	12	13	14	15	16	17	18	19	20	21	22	23	24	25	26	27	NCTSC	Pts	Ref
1997	Walker Evans Racing	20	Chevy	WDW	TUS	HOM	PHO	POR	EVG	I70	NHA	TEX	BRI	NZH	MLW	LVL	CNS	HPT	IRP	FLM	NSV	GLN	RCH	MAR	SON	MMR	CAL	PHO	LVS; 24		110th	91	
1998	Walker Evans Racing	20	Chevy	WDW	HOM	PHO	POR	EVG	I70	GLN	TEX	BRI	MLW	NZH	CAL	PPR; 33	IRP	NHA	FLM	NSV	HPT	LVL	RCH	MEM	GTY	MAR	SON	MMR	PHO	LVS; 32	83rd	131	
1999	Walker Evans Racing	20	Chevy	HOM	PHO	EVG	MMR; 32	MAR	MEM	PPR	I70	BRI	TEX	PIR	GLN	MLW	NSV	NZH	MCH	NHA	IRP	GTY	HPT	RCH	LVS; 24	LVL	TEX	CAL			74th	158	
2000	Bill McAnally Racing	62	Chevy	DAY	HOM	PHO; 13	MMR; 13	MAR	PIR	GTY; 11	MEM	PPR	EVG; 24	TEX	KEN	GLN	MLW	NHA	NZH	MCH	IRP	NSV	CIC; DNQ	RCH	DOV	TEX	CAL; 19				40th	615	
2001	Bill McAnally Racing	62	Chevy	DAY	HOM	MMR; 3	MAR																		LVS; 11	PHO; 13	CAL				31st	946	
2001	TKO Motorsports	41	Dodge					GTY; 15	DAR	PPR	DOV	TEX; 2	MEM	MLW	KAN; 26	KEN	NHA	IRP	NSH	CIC; 10	NZH	RCH	SBO	TEX							31st	946	
2002	Orleans Racing	62	Dodge	DAY; 13	DAR; 20	MAR; 9	GTY; 11	PPR; 26	DOV; 7	TEX; 1*	MEM; 13	MLW; 4	KAN; 27	KEN; 11	NHA; 5	MCH; 18	IRP; 29	NSH; 6	RCH; 16	TEX; 1	SBO; 11	LVS; 8	CAL; 3	PHO; 13	HOM; 11						11th	2893	
2003	Orleans Racing	62	Dodge	DAY; 10	DAR; 3	MMR; 3	MAR; 16	CLT; 2	DOV; 18	TEX; 1	MEM; 8	MLW; 1*	KAN; 9	KEN; 22	GTW; 1*	MCH; 1*	IRP; 4	NSH; 5	BRI; 4	RCH; 7	NHA; 5	**CAL**; 2	**LVS**; 1*	**SBO**; 15	TEX; 1*	MAR; 11	PHO; 12	HOM; 29			4th	3797	
2005	Orleans Racing	77	Dodge	DAY; 30	CAL; 21	ATL; DNQ	MAR; DNQ	GTY; 22	MFD; 15	CLT; 8	DOV; 16	TEX; 27	MCH; 11	MLW; 5	KAN; 8	KEN; 29	MEM; 3	IRP; 8	NSH; 6	BRI; 36	RCH; 11	NHA; 10	LVS; 35	MAR; 24	ATL; 15	TEX; 32	PHO; 23	HOM; 16			19th	2564	
2006	Orleans Racing	77	Dodge	DAY; 24	CAL; 36	ATL; 13	MAR; 6	GTY; 14	CLT; 14	MFD; 17	DOV; 19	TEX; 26	MCH; 16	MLW; 19	KAN; 4	KEN; 3	MEM; 17	IRP; 16	NSH; 5	BRI; 17	NHA; 34	LVS; 15	TAL; 12	MAR; 19	ATL; 26	TEX; 17	PHO; 21	HOM; 2			15th	2984	
2007	Orleans Racing	77	Chevy	DAY; 21	CAL; 21	ATL; 6	MAR; 25	KAN; 11	CLT; 35	MFD; 9	DOV; 36	TEX; 24	MCH; 3	MLW; 28	MEM; 22	KEN; 22	IRP; 10	NSH; 12	BRI; 2	GTW; 10	NHA; 25	LVS; 30	TAL; 16	MAR; 11	ATL; 8	TEX; 2	PHO; 13	HOM; 19			11th	2874	
2008	Circle Bar Racing	10	Ford	DAY; 34	CAL; 12	ATL; 15	MAR; 11	KAN; 6	CLT; 3	MFD; 30	DOV; 20	TEX; 15	MCH; 5	MLW; 16	MEM; 22	KEN; 28	IRP; 6	NSH; 24	BRI; 13	GTW; 21	NHA; 20	LVS; 20	TAL; 20	MAR; 22	ATL; 16	TEX; 16	PHO; 10	HOM; 18			15th	2840	
2011	Germain Racing	62	Toyota	DAY; 27	PHO; 17	DAR; 25	MAR; 9	NSH; 17	DOV; 7	CLT; 30	KAN; 7	TEX; 14	KEN; 3	IOW; 16	NSH; 13	IRP; 16	POC; 22	MCH; 8	BRI; 20	ATL; 18	CHI; 14	NHA; 12	KEN; 19	LVS; 9	TAL; 8	MAR; 9	TEX; 31	HOM; 20			12th	713	
2012	Richard Childress Racing	2	Chevy	DAY; 20	MAR	CAR	KAN	CLT; 12	DOV	TEX; 4	KEN	IOW	CHI; 2*	POC	MCH	BRI; 5	ATL	IOW	KEN	LVS; 4	TAL	MAR	TEX; 17	PHO; 23	HOM						83rd	0^{1}	
2013	Richard Childress Racing	62	Chevy	DAY; 29	MAR; 12	CAR; 3	KAN; 4	CLT; 2	DOV; 5	TEX; 5	KEN; 25	IOW; 31	ELD; 5	POC; 9	MCH; 8	BRI; 16	MSP; 18	IOW; 24	CHI; 25	LVS; 8	TAL; 11	MAR; 2	TEX; 4	PHO; 3	HOM; 4						7th	717	
2026	McAnally–Hilgemann Racing	20	Chevy	DAY	ATL	STP	DAR	ROC	BRI	TEX	GLN	DOV	CLT	NSH	MCH	COR; 16	LRP	NWS	IRP	RCH	NHA	BRI	KAN	CLT	PHO	TAL	MAR	HOM			67th	21	

==== K&N Pro Series West ====
NASCAR K&N Pro Series West results
Year	Team	No.	Make	1	2	3	4	5	6	7	8	9	10	11	12	13	14	NKNPSWC	Pts	Ref
1998	Orleans Racing	88	Chevy	TUS	LVS; 19													24th	625	
1998	Orleans Racing	20	Chevy			PHO; 19	CAL	HPT	MMR	AMP	POR	CAL	**PPR**; 5	EVG	SON	MMR; 20	LVS; 5	24th	625	
1999	Orleans Racing	20	Chevy	TUS; 26	LVS; 25	PHO; 20	CAL; 31	PPR; 10	MMR; 12	IRW; 15	EVG; 16	POR; 17	IRW; 9	RMR; 2	**LVS**; 3	MMR; 8	MOT; 4	13th	1742	
2000	Bill McAnally Racing	16	Chevy	PHO; 4	MMR; 1	**LVS**; 4*	CAL; 3	LAG; 9	IRW; 2	POR; 3	EVG; 1	**IRW**; 5*	**RMR**; 6	MMR; 15	IRW; 3			1st	1956	
2001	Bill McAnally Racing	16	Chevy	PHO; 25	LVS; 8	TUS; 12	MMR; 3*	CAL; 1	IRW; 1*	LAG; 4	KAN; 4	EVG; 1*	CNS; 2	IRW; 1*	RMR; 16*	LVS; 1	IRW; 1*	1st	2257	
2002	Orleans Racing	62	Dodge	PHO	LVS	CAL	KAN	EVG	IRW	S99	RMR	DCS	**LVS**; 23*					51st	104	
2018	Bill McAnally Racing	62	Toyota	KCR	TUS	TUS	OSS	CNS	SON	DCS	IOW	EVG	GTW	LVS; 5	MER	AAS	KCR	36th	39	

^{*} Season still in progress
^{1} Ineligible for series points

=== ARCA Bondo/Mar-Hyde Series ===
(key) (Bold – Pole position awarded by qualifying time. Italics – Pole position earned by points standings or practice time. * – Most laps led.)

ARCA Bondo/Mar-Hyde Series results
Year	Team	No.	Make	1	2	3	4	5	6	7	8	9	10	11	12	13	14	15	16	17	18	19	20	ARSC	Pts	Ref
2000	Orleans Racing	96	Chevy	DAY	SLM	AND	CLT	KIL	FRS	MCH	POC	TOL	KEN	BLN	POC	WIN	ISF	KEN	DSF	SLM	CLT; 9	TAL	ATL	97th	185	

=== Grand-Am Rolex Sports Car Series ===
(key)

Year	Team	Make	Engine	Class	1	2	3	4	5	6	7	8	9	10	11	12	Rank	Points
2009	The Racer's Group	Porsche 997 GT3 Cup	Porsche 3.6L Flat-6	GT	DAY	VIR	NJ	LAG	WAT	MOH	DAY	BAR	WAT	MON; 2	UTA	HOM	54th	32
2011	The Racer's Group	Porsche 997 GT3 Cup	Porsche 3.6L Flat-6	GT	DAY; 1	HOM	BAR	VIR	LRP	WAT	ELK	LAG	NJ	WAT	MON	MOH		

=== WeatherTech SportsCar Championship ===
(key) (Races in bold indicate pole position; results in italics indicate fastest lap)

Year	Entrant	Class	Chassis	Engine	1	2	3	4	5	6	7	8	9	10	11	Rank	Points
2016	BAR1 Motorsports	PC	Oreca FLM09	Chevrolet LS3 6.2 L V8	DAY; 3	SEB	LBH	LGA	DET	WGL	MOS	LIM	ELK	COA	PET	31st	1
2018	BAR1 Motorsports	P	Riley Mk. 30	Gibson GK428 4.2 L V8	DAY; 14	SEB	LBH	MDO	DET	WGL	MOS	ELK	LGA	PET		59th	17

Sporting positions
Preceded by Sean Woodside	NASCAR Winston West Series champion 2000, 2001	Succeeded by Eric Norris
Achievements
Preceded by Travis Kvapil	NASCAR Craftsman Truck Series Rookie of the Year; 2002	Succeeded by Carl Edwards
