= Coast Casinos =

Gambling company

- Formerly: Coast Resorts
- Industry: Gambling, hotels, entertainment
- Founded: March 2, 1979; 47 years ago
- Founder: Michael Gaughan
- Defunct: July 1, 2004; 22 years ago
- Fate: Acquired by Boyd Gaming
- Headquarters: Paradise, Nevada, U.S.
- Products: Casinos, hotels
- Owner: Michael Gaughan

Coast Casinos, formerly known as Coast Resorts, was an American casino operating company in the Las Vegas Valley, Nevada. Founded by businessman Michael Gaughan, the company operated several hotel-casinos catering primarily to local residents, including the Barbary Coast, Gold Coast, The Orleans, and Suncoast.

Boyd Gaming announced plans to acquire Coast Casinos in February 2004. The buyout was complete on July 1, 2004, at a cost of $1.2 billion.

== Properties ==
At the time of its acquisition by Boyd Gaming in July 2004, Coast Casinos operated four hotel-casinos throughout the Las Vegas Valley. Its portfolio included the Barbary Coast Hotel and Casino on the Las Vegas Strip, which opened on March 2, 1979, and the Gold Coast Hotel and Casino on West Flamingo Road, which opened on December 21, 1986. The company subsequently expanded with the opening of The Orleans on West Tropicana Avenue in December 28, 1996, and the Suncoast Hotel and Casino on Alta Drive in September 12, 2000. The Orleans was later expanded to include the Orleans Arena, which opened on May 25, 2003.

=== South Coast Casino ===
In November 2001, Coast Resorts acquired a 50-acre parcel in the southern Las Vegas Valley for the development of a new casino resort. In April 2003, Coast Casinos announced that it would build the South Coast resort on the property, with the opening expected two years later. It would be similar to the company's Suncoast Hotel and Casino. Construction began on April 22, 2004, shortly before Coast Casinos was acquired by Boyd Gaming. South Coast Casino opened on December 22, 2005.

Early revenue was less than expected, in part because certain amenities had yet to be finished, including a spa and nightclub. Nearby road construction, as well as an unfinished nearby exit from Interstate 15, also hampered the resort. In July 2006, Boyd announced that it would sell the struggling resort to Michael Gaughan. Gaughan subsequently announced that he would rename the property as South Point. He took over operations and ownership on October 25, 2006, and the name change became effective immediately. It now operates as the South Point Hotel, Casino & Spa.
