= Patty melt =

Type of burger

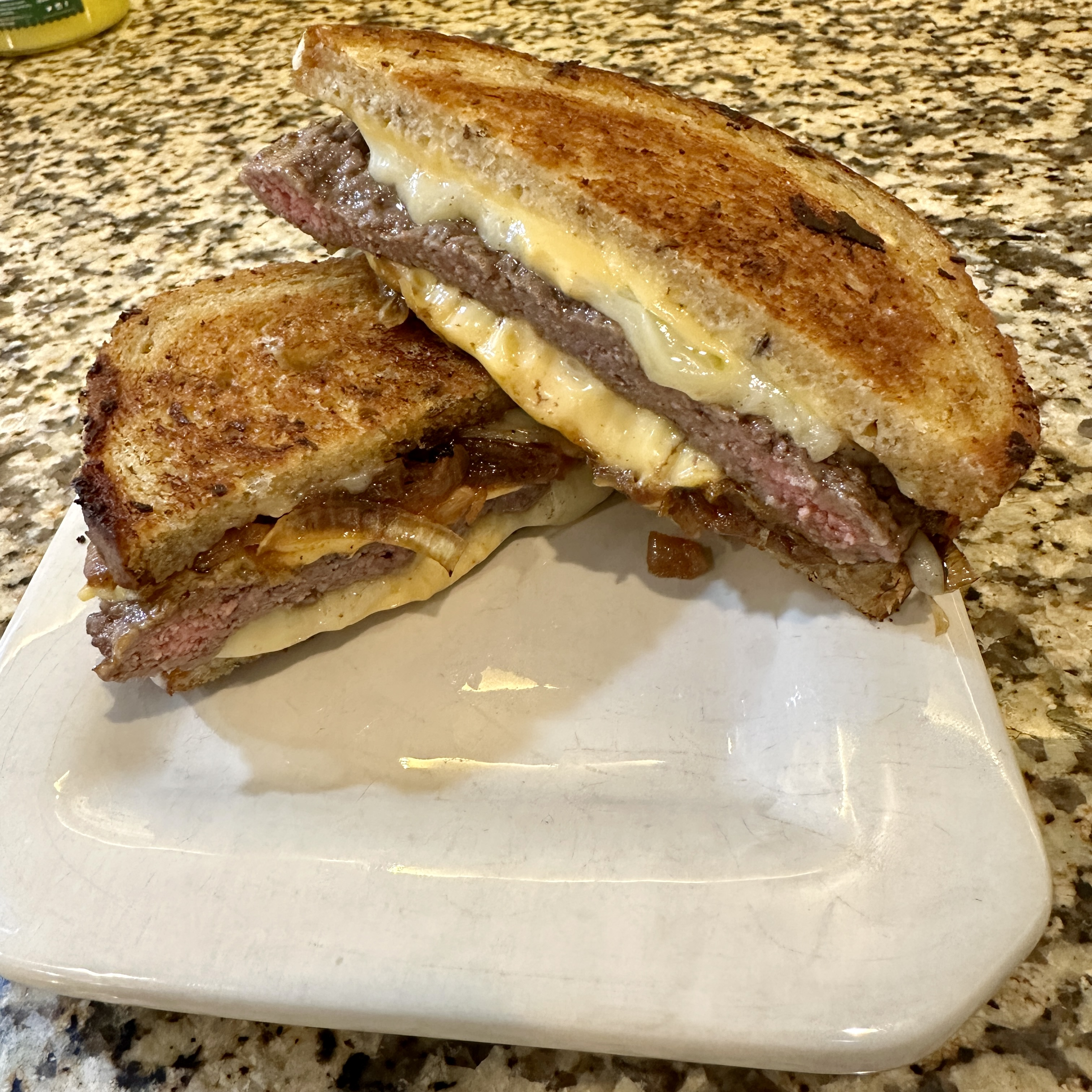
- Patty melt sliced to show layers of fried onions, cheese, and beef patty
- Place of origin: United States
- Serving temperature: Hot
- Main ingredients: Seeded rye bread, hamburger patty, grilled onions, North American-style Swiss cheese or American Cheese
- Variations: Sourdough bread, Texas toast, Thousand Island dressing, American cheese

A patty melt is an American grilled hamburger consisting of a ground beef patty topped with melted cheese and caramelized onions between two slices of griddled bread.

== Description and ingredients ==
The patty melt is variously described as a variant of the traditional American cheeseburger, topped with fried onions and served on sliced bread instead of a traditional bun, or as a variant of a grilled cheese that includes a hamburger patty and fried onions.

The burger consists of a ground beef patty topped with melted cheese (traditionally Swiss cheese) and usually with caramelized onions between two slices of griddled bread. The bread is typically caraway-seeded rye or marbled rye, though sourdough or Texas toast are sometimes substituted in some regions, including the Southern U.S. Patty melts are typically made without condiments or garnishes.

Like a grilled cheese, the patty melt maintains its structural integrity when eaten, as all ingredients are grilled at the same time and assembled while still hot, which melds the grilled bread, hamburger patty, cheese, and onions into a single unit that does not fall apart while being eaten.

== History and origins ==
Sandwiches calling for hamburger patties to be placed into two slices of bread, rather than into a bun, date to the mid-1800s and were referred to as hamburger sandwiches. It is unclear when the patty melt was invented, but it was most likely the mid-20th century, either during the Great Depression or the postwar economic boom. Several culinary writers have suggested that Los Angeles restaurateur Tiny Naylor may have invented the patty melt sometime between 1930 and 1959, depending on the source; it was on the menu at Tiny Naylor's in the early 1950s. Even if Naylor did not invent the sandwich, it is agreed that he and his family helped popularize the sandwich in their restaurants and in restaurants where they worked, which included Tiny Naylor's, Du-par's, and Wolfgang Puck's Granita.

== Home cooking ==
Home cooks typically make patty melts in a cast-iron skillet or pan in steps by separately grilling the patties, caramelizing the onions, assembling the burger, and then grilling it as for a grilled cheese sandwich. Gentleman's Quarterly called it "the great indoor burger".

== Popularity ==
According to New York Times food writer Pete Wells in 2024, the burger is "virtually unknown" outside of the United States; Wells theorizes that the amount of space on a flattop grill required to grill onions, patty, and bread at the same time has restricted its appeal outside of typical short-order restaurants. It is typically on the menu of diners, coffee shops, and lunch counters, but in the early 2020s it started to appear on some upscale menus.

== See also ==
- List of American sandwiches
- List of hamburgers
- List of sandwiches
