= Harry Lewis (actor) =

American actor (1920–2013)

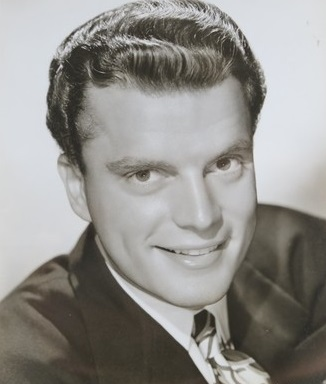
- Born: April 1, 1920; Los Angeles, California, U.S.
- Died: June 9, 2013 (aged 93); Beverly Hills, California, U.S.
- Other name: Cpl. Harry Lewis
- Occupations: Actor, restaurateur
- Years active: 1941–1985
- Spouse: Marilyn Friedman Lewis (m. 1952)

Harry L. Lewis (April 1, 1920 – June 9, 2013) was a supporting actor in films and was the founder, along with his wife Marilyn, of the Hamburger Hamlet and Kate Mantilini restaurant chains.

== Biography ==
Lewis was born in Los Angeles, California, on April 1, 1920. His first film role was as a flagman in Dive Bomber (1941). He was immediately put under contract to Warner Bros., at which he made several films. He is perhaps best remembered for his role as Edward "Toots" Bass, one of Edward G. Robinson's henchmen, in 1948's Key Largo.

Other small film roles included appearances as Claude Rains's butler in The Unsuspected (1947), Sheriff Clyde Boston in Gun Crazy (1949), the head of a gang of criminals in Blonde Dynamite (1950), and as a gangster in "The Monkey Mystery" episode of Adventures of Superman on television (1951). He also had a minor role as a slave in Cecil B. Demille's epic The Ten Commandments.

In 1950, Lewis and his then girlfriend Marilyn Friedman, invested US$3,500 (equivalent to $46,800 in 2025) to open the Hamburger Hamlet restaurant at the corner of Sunset Boulevard and Hilldale Avenue on the Sunset Strip in Los Angeles. The restaurant was successful and grew into a chain of 24 locations. The couple's two children, David and Adam, joined them in the restaurant business. The Lewises took Hamburger Hamlet public in 1969, and sold the company for $29.2 million in 1987 (equivalent to $82.8 million in 2025).

Lewis and his wife Marilyn later owned the Beverly Hills restaurant institution Kate Mantilini, which closed in 2014 after operating for 27 years. The restaurant was named after a mistress of Marilyn's uncle.

Lewis died on June 9, 2013, at the age of 93. His widow Marilyn died on May 3, 2017.

== Filmography ==
Year	Title	Role	Notes
1941	Dive Bomber	Flag Man	Uncredited
1941	International Squadron	Pilot	Uncredited
1941	One Foot in Heaven	Young Soldier in Hospital	Uncredited
1941	They Died with Their Boots On	Youth	Uncredited
1941	The Body Disappears	Elevator Operator	Uncredited
1941	You're in the Army Now	Recruit	Uncredited
1942	Captains of the Clouds	Mr. Burton - RCAF Applicant	Uncredited
1942	Always in My Heart	Steve	
1942	Secret Enemies	Radio Operator	Uncredited
1942	Busses Roar	Danny	
1942	Desperate Journey	Evans	Uncredited
1943	The Hard Way	Serious Young Man	Uncredited
1943	Air Force	Minor Role	Uncredited
1944	The Last Ride	Harry Bronson	
1944	Winged Victory	Cadet Peter Clark	
1946	Her Kind of Man	Candy	
1947	The Unsuspected	Max	
1947	Always Together	Reporter	Uncredited
1948	Winter Meeting	Juvenile	Uncredited
1948	Wallflower	Arthur	Uncredited
1948	Key Largo	Edward 'Toots' Bass	
1948	Adventures of Don Juan	Innkeeper's Son	Uncredited
1948	The Decision of Christopher Blake	Juvenile in Play	Uncredited
1948	Whiplash	Press Man	Uncredited
1949	Joe Palooka in the Counterpunch	Chick Bennett	
1949	Bomba on Panther Island	Robert Maitland	
1950	Gun Crazy	Deputy Clyde Boston	
1950	Blonde Dynamite	Champ Fallon	
1950	My Friend Irma Goes West	Trooper	Uncredited
1950	Southside 1-1000	FBI Agent	Uncredited
1951	The Fat Man	Happy Stevens	
1953	Run for the Hills	Mr. Carewe	
1953	Vice Squad	Arresting Detective	Uncredited
1956	Alfred Hitchcock Presents	Ritchie	Season 1 Episode 37: "Decoy"
1956	The Harder They Fall	New York Ring Announcer	Uncredited
1956	The Ten Commandments	Slave	Uncredited
1956	Accused of Murder	Bartender	Uncredited
1956	The Man Is Armed	Cole	
1959	I Mobster	Gangster	Uncredited
1969	Pendulum	Brooks Elliot	
1978	Invisible Strangler	Stage Manager	
