= Hamburger Hamlet =

LA-based restaurant chain

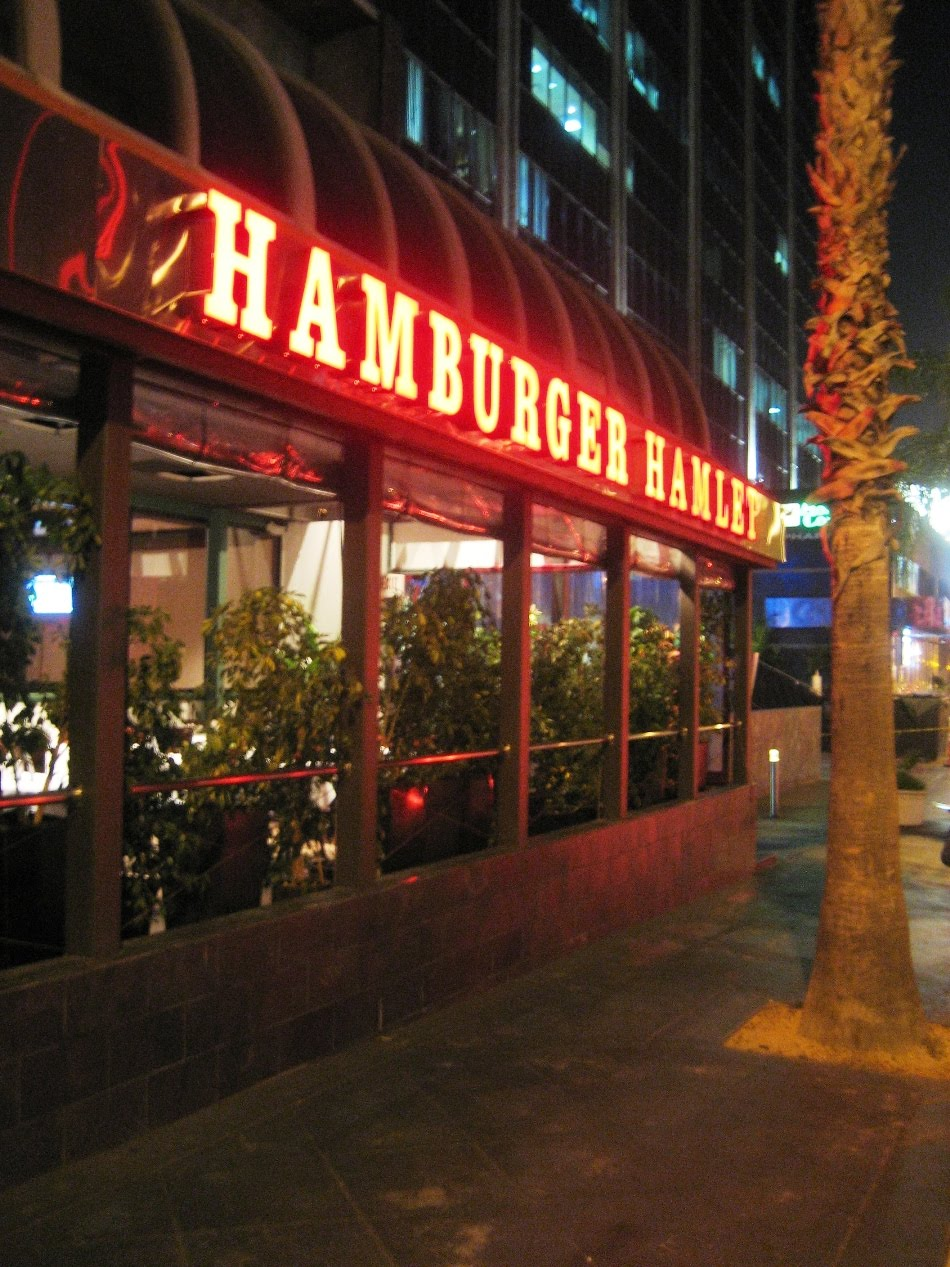
Hamburger Hamlet on Sunset Boulevard in West Hollywood, c. 2011

Hamburger Hamlet (or "The Hamlet") was a chain of restaurants based in Los Angeles, and a point of reference for the inhabitants and creative industries of the city. Opened in 1950 by actor Harry Lewis with his future wife Marilyn (m.1952), it grew to a chain of 24 locations, including the Chicago and Washington, D.C. metro areas, before they were all either sold or closed down. Lewis named the restaurant in honor of the titular character in Shakespeare's eponymous play.

== Patronage of celebrities ==
In Hollywood biographies of both Peggy Lee and Alfred Hitchcock, Hamburger Hamlet is mentioned as a favorite haunt. In the novel American Dream Machine, author Matthew Specktor mourns the closing of the Sunset Boulevard Hamlet as the passing of a bygone era of Old Hollywood glamour. In 2014, Los Angeles Magazine published the article Vintage Los Angeles: The Tragedy of Hamburger Hamlet, where author Alison Martino wrote:

It was where you bumped into celebrities and industry moguls in a casual environment, dining in darkly lit giant red leather chairs. But there was nothing casual about the clientele. Where else could you see Dean Martin sipping a martini at the bar, Lucille Ball hair spraying her red locks in the ladies room, Bette Davis chain smoking in the Tap Room, or Frank Sinatra taking a meeting with his publicist? I witnessed all of this first hand. Even the restaurant’s hostess, actress and singer Frances Davis, who was once married to Miles Davis, would occasionally burst into song and dance while taking you to your table. I remember Francis and Diahann Carroll discussing chord progressions in the lobby.

Robert B. Parker, in his 1981 detective novel A Savage Place, refers to the Hamlet on Sunset as a place Spenser the detective mentions he would like to return to while in Los Angeles, saying that it is because he is a "fancy", but "plain", and "big" eater.

== Food ==
The restaurants served hamburgers topped with what were considered exotic combinations of toppings, such as a bacon cheeseburger with Russian dressing. A famed side dish were the "little fried onions". Tomato relish was provided at each table. They also served omelettes and Mexican dishes. In 1987 the Lewises opened upscale restaurant Kate Mantilini. In 1997 Koo Koo Roo bought 14 Hamlet locations for $33 million.

MeTV wrote:

In an era when putting bacon and cheese on a burger was considered luxuriantly deluxe, Hamburger Hamlet topped its burger with guacamole, baked beans and marinara sauce. They served a burger with jalapeños on garlic toast. The "Emperor Henry IV" burger came with ham, bacon and Russian dressing. As far back as 1977, the restaurant was even serving a bunless burger for the carb conscious. (It was based in L.A., after all.)

=== Menu items ===
Some of the items available listed on a 1981 menu include:

Soups, Whets, Extras:

- Side of Golden French Fried Chicken Wings
- Onion Soup Fondue - One of the Best
- Borscht by the Bowl, Really Cool
- Jellied Consomme, Just So Refreshing
- Lobster Bisque - Famous for This

Gourmet Hamburgers, served with French Fries:

- 5. With Lotsa Grilled Onions and Sauce Marinara $3.75 ($13.28 in 2025)
- 6. The Guacamole Burger $3.75
- 7. Russian Dressing or Bar-B-Que Sauce $3.50 ($12.39 in 2025)
- 9. Everything On It, $3.75
- 10. Our Very Best Chili and Onions Burger $3.75
- 12. On a Diet? The Hamburger on a Plate $3.75
- 14. Mayonnaise, Lettuce, Tomato and Cucumbers $3.50
- 15. Sautéed Mushrooms and Sour Cream and Yummy Melted Cheese $3.95 ($13.99 in 2025)

Gourmet Hamburgers (continued):

- 16. The Brunch Burger $3.95, The Mighty Brunchburger $4.95 ($17.53 in 2025)
- 17. Emperor Henry IV (Named for Rex Harrison) $4.25 ($15.05 in 2025)
- 18. Melted Swiss Cheese over Hot Sauerkraut $3.75
- 20. Fresh Leaf Spinach and Melted Cheeseburger with Little Fried Onions $3.95
- 21. Delicious Ratatouille Burger $3.75
- 22. Burger with Fromage au Garlic and Herbs $3.75
- Cheeseburger with Pickles $3.75
- Hamlet Onion Patty Melt $4.50 ($15.94 in 2025)

Sweets

- Hot Apple Pie with Cinnamon Stick Ice Cream and Hot Rum Sauce Our Specialty $2.50
- Wonderful Hot Fudge Cake $3.95
- Big Beautiful Slice of Fudge Cake $2.50
- Cheese Cake dripping with blueberries $2.50
- Delicious Carrot and Pineapple Cake $2.00
- Very Good Rice Pudding $2.25
- Our $6,000 Bake Apple (in season) $2.25
- Egg Custard Lulu $1.95
- English Muffin with butter and jams $1.25
- Compote of Fresh Fruit $1.95

== Locations ==
Downtown L.A./Hollywood	Westside	San Fernando Valley
Downtown Los Angeles, "Wilshire & Flower": 615 South Flower Street (closed 1995); Hollywood: 6914/6922 Hollywood Boulevard; Sunset Strip, West Hollywood, 9201 Sunset Boulevard, closed 2011; Wilshire Center/Koreatown, "Wilshire Plaza": 3303 Wilshire Boulevard, next to Bullock's Wilshire	Beverly Hills: 122 South Beverly Drive; Beverly Hills:inside Bonwit Teller. Upstairs next to the "Bambola" children's department. Opened in January 1973.; Brentwood: 11648 San Vicente Boulevard; Century City: 1800 Century Park East; "Robertson": 8783 Bonner Drive near Cedars Sinai Hospital; "Sepulveda": Rancho Park, 2927 Sepulveda Boulevard near National; Westwood Village: 10943 Weyburn Avenue	Agoura Hills, 29020 Agoura Road; Encino, "Le Hot Club" restaurant, 15910 Ventura Boulevard; Northridge, 19530 Nordhoff Street (closed 1995); Sherman Oaks, 4419 Van Nuys Boulevard, the last location to close (2018); Woodland Hills, 21937 Ventura Boulevard
Elsewhere in California	Washington metropolitan area	Elsewhere in the U.S.
Costa Mesa: 1545 Adams Av.; Irvine, 4126 Campus Drive (closed 1995); Long Beach-Marina Pacifica, 6575 East Pacific Coast Highway (closed 1995); Palm Springs, 107 North Palm Canyon Drive, now Starbucks; Pasadena, 214 South Lake Avenue, closed 2014, became Du-par's.; Santa Clarita, 27430 The Old Road, Valencia; Simi Valley (closed 1995); Cupertino (closed 1995)	Bethesda, Maryland: 10400 Old Georgetown Road. First East Coast location, opened 1973, sold to Biff Naylor and rebranded "Du-par's Hamburger Hamlet" in Dec. 2012, closed for good in 2013. Now "Not Your Average Joe's".; Chevy Chase (Washington, D.C.) - 5225 Wisconsin Avenue, N.W.; Crystal City, Virginia - Crystal City Shops, operated by Biff Naylor, closed 2014; Georgetown (Washington, D.C.) - 3125 M Street, N.W. Opened c.1980; Alexandria, Virginia: Portner's restaurant, 109 South Asaph in the 1883 Columbia Firehouse	Atlanta, 3402 Piedmont Road, Buckhead; Chicago - Three locations of which one was 44 East Walton Street near Rush Street. All three closed in 1995.

Map of Hamburger Hamlet locations in Central and Western Los Angeles

Map of Hamburger Hamlet locations in Southern California

Map of approximate Hamburger Hamlet locations in the Washington, D.C. metropolitan area

== Financials and ownership ==
In 1986 the revenue was just under $40 million and the net income just about $1.5 million. in 1987 the revenue increased to $44.8 million but net income dropped to only $508,700. In that year a New York investment firm, Weatherly Private Capital, Inc., bought the restaurant chain for $33.1 million in a leveraged buyout. The Hamlets had 1,800 employees at that time, with 24 locations.

== Marilyn Lewis ==
Marilyn was admired as a businesswoman but also, from 1965-1975, for her couture designs under her own label Cardinali, which had a staff of 50 in 1968. Nevertheless in a 1968 interview she said she was always home at 4 P.M. to "be a Mom" to her two boys, then 13 and 16. She moved to Greater Los Angeles from Cleveland, Ohio in the late 1940s. The Los Angeles Times called her the "matriarch" of the Hamlets in the early 1980s. At that time, aged 52, she moved out to Washington, D.C. to oversee the opening and management of the Hamlet's 3 restaurants in the area, splitting her time between quarters behind the Georgetown location and a home in adjacent Bethesda, Maryland.
