= South Point Hotel, Casino & Spa =

Casino hotel in Nevada, United States

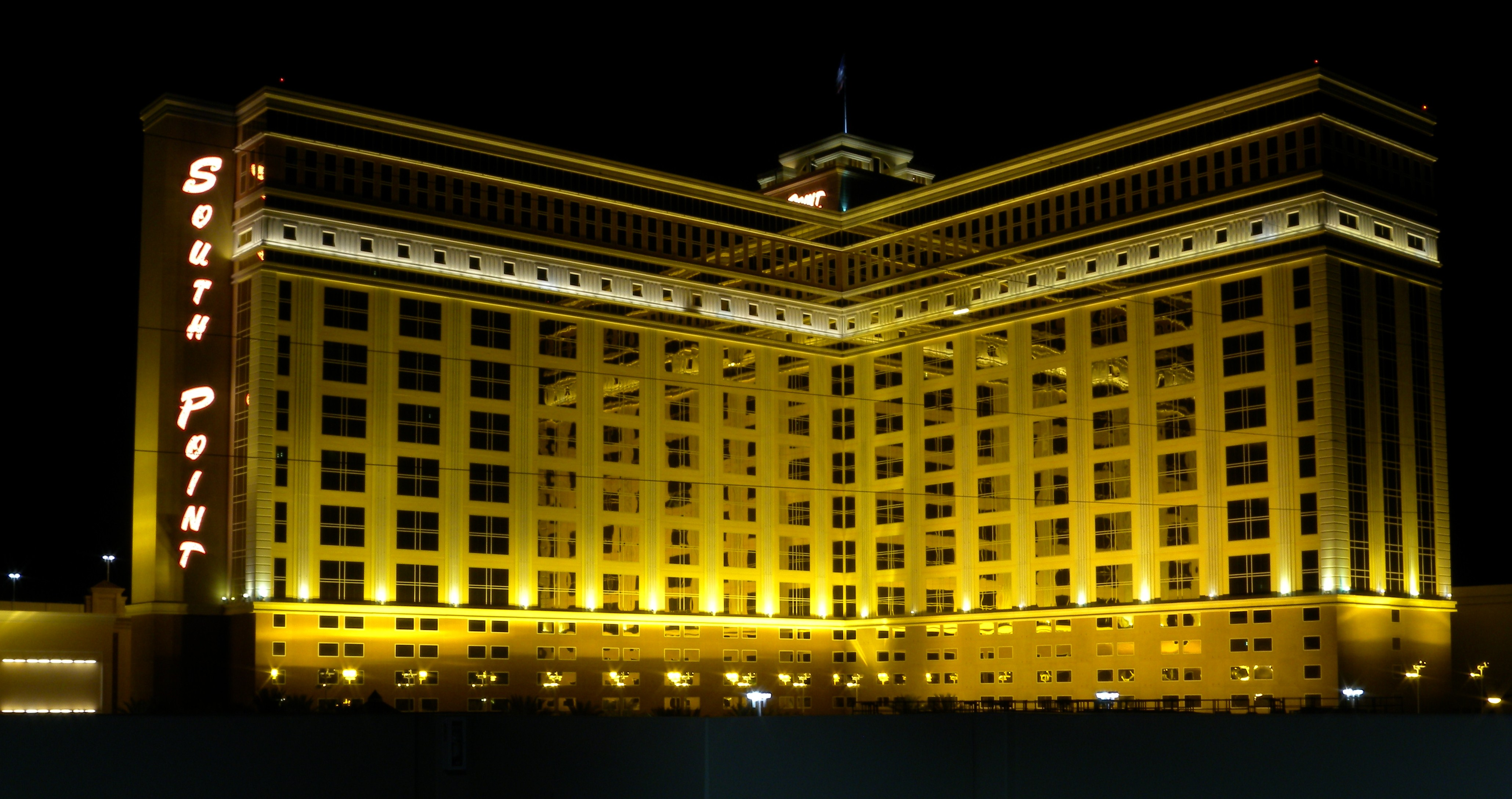
- Interactive map of South Point Hotel, Casino & Spa
- Location: Enterprise, Nevada, U.S., 89183; 9777 South Las Vegas Boulevard; 36°00′41″N 115°10′31″W
- Opened: December 22, 2005; 20 years ago
- No. of rooms: 2,163
- Gaming space: 137,232 sq ft (12,749.3 m^{2})
- Signature attractions: Equestrian center Spa; Century Theatres; South Point Bowling Center
- Notable restaurants: Coronado Cafe; Don Vito's; Michael's; BaJa Miguel's; Steak 'n Shake
- Casino type: Land-based
- Owner: Michael Gaughan
- Architect: Leo A Daly / Klai Juba Architects
- Previous names: South Coast
- Renovated in: 2007–08, 2010, 2013–14
- Website: www.southpointcasino.com

South Point Hotel, Casino & Spa (formerly South Coast) is a resort located along Las Vegas Boulevard in Enterprise, Nevada, south of the Las Vegas Strip. It is owned and operated by Michael Gaughan, the founder of Coast Casinos. It includes a 137,232 sq ft (12,749.3 m^{2}) casino and a 25-story hotel with 2,163 rooms.

Coast Casinos purchased the site in 2001, and announced the South Coast project in April 2003. Construction began one year later. Coast Casinos was subsequently merged with Boyd Gaming. The South Coast was built at a cost of $625 million. It opened on December 22, 2005, and included an 80,000 sq ft (7,400 m^{2}) casino and 652 rooms. A second hotel tower opened the following year.

The resort struggled early on, and Gaughan took over ownership from Boyd in October 2006, renaming it the South Point. A third tower was opened in 2008, and further expansion took place in 2010, adding new restaurants and additional casino space. The resort has an equestrian and events center, and was the namesake for Gaughan's NASCAR team, South Point Racing. It is also the sponsor of the South Point 400 stock car race.

== History ==
In November 2001, Coast Resorts (later Coast Casinos) announced that it had acquired a 50-acre parcel in the southern Las Vegas Valley. The site is located several miles south of the Las Vegas Strip, at the southwest corner of Las Vegas Boulevard and Silverado Ranch Boulevard. Interstate 15 runs alongside the property's western edge. Coast planned to begin construction of a locals casino on the property within three years, once housing development picked up in the area.

=== South Coast (2005–06) ===
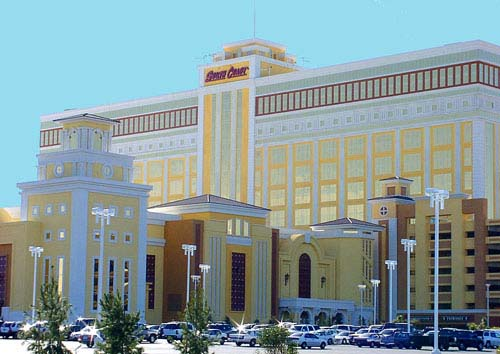
South Coast in February 2006

In April 2003, Coast Casinos announced that it would build the South Coast resort on the property, with the opening expected two years later. It would be similar to the company's Suncoast Hotel and Casino. It would be built in the fastest-growing area of the Las Vegas Valley, and would be the first major resort in the area, which included the small Silverton hotel-casino. It would compete against the Green Valley Ranch hotel-casino, located approximately five miles east.

Coast Casinos owner Michael Gaughan initially said that the resort would target a younger clientele and focus primarily on the locals market. Early in the design phase, a total of 750 rooms were planned. Gaughan subsequently added three 245-foot hotel towers to his plans for a total of 2,139 rooms, stating that he viewed the project as an extension of the Strip rather than a neighborhood casino. The hotel floorplan would be built out with the towers forming a "T" shape when viewed overhead. Gaughan also sought to add a showroom space capable of converting into a nightclub.

Groundbreaking took place on April 22, 2004. Three months later, Coast Casinos merged with Boyd Gaming, becoming a subsidiary of the latter. Gaughan remained involved with the South Coast project. J.A. Tiberti Construction served as general contractor. The resort was designed by Leo A Daly and Klai Juba Architects. The project was viewed as a larger version of the Suncoast, and it had a similar layout. Gaughan's son, vice president and general manager Michael Gaughan Jr., described the property as "the Suncoast on steroids". During construction, the surrounding area became popular for condominium and timeshare projects, including the adjacent Grandview at Las Vegas.

Boyd announced in May 2005 that it would soon begin construction on the second tower. The decision came sooner than expected, a result of strong economic conditions. The second phase increased the project's cost by $100 million, bringing the total to $600 million. Gaughan had originally planned to spend around $350 million on the project. An increase in the cost of building supplies and labor contributed to the rising total.

The South Coast opened on the night of December 22, 2005. The opening featured a fireworks show which sparked a small rooftop fire, although it had no impact on the opening. At the time, the South Coast was the first Las Vegas resort to be seen by motorists arriving from southern California on I-15. It also served nearby communities, such as Southern Highlands and Anthem, which lacked a casino resort. The property employed around 2,400 people. The second tower was scheduled to open approximately four months after the resort's initial opening.

The ultimate cost of the resort was $625 million. Early revenue was less than expected, in part because certain amenities had yet to be finished, including a spa and nightclub. Nearby road construction, as well as an unfinished nearby exit from I-15, also hampered the resort.

=== South Point (2006–present) ===
In July 2006, Boyd announced that it would sell the struggling resort to Gaughan, who disliked Boyd's corporate style of management. He initially wanted to buy back The Orleans hotel-casino, which he had owned under Coast Casinos. Boyd wanted to sell him the Gold Coast instead. They eventually compromised on the South Coast. Gaughan said, "I'll straighten this place out. I've kind of been too far removed from it. I've gotten lazy. It's time to go back to work". Boyd believed that the resort was several years away from recouping the company's investment. In addition, Boyd wanted to focus on its upcoming Echelon Place project, as well as a potential North Coast resort.

With Boyd retaining Coast Casinos, Gaughan announced that he would rename the property as the South Point. He chose the name because of the minimal number of letters that would have to be changed out on signage. Gaughan took over operations and ownership on October 25, 2006, and the name change became effective immediately. Boyd sold the resort to Gaughan in exchange for shares that he owned in the company, valued at $512 million.

In August 2007, Gaughan launched a $95 million, year-long expansion project which included the addition of the third hotel tower. Despite poor economic conditions caused by the Great Recession, Gaughan did not lay off any employees and proceeded with expansions to the property. The third tower was finished in 2008, and a casino expansion was opened two years later. As of 2010, the South Point's clientele was divided between locals and tourists.

In October 2011, the South Point launched a free Internet poker website, offering prizes such as a trip to the resort. It was launched in preparation for the possible legalization of money-based poker websites in the future. The following year, the resort received state approval to operate a real-money poker website in Nevada. The website, known as Real Gaming, was eventually launched in 2014.

In 2018, the resort began sponsoring the South Point 400, an annual stock car race held in Las Vegas. Gaughan had previously owned a NASCAR team known as South Point Racing.

== Features ==
The South Point's casino measures 137,232 sq ft (12,749.3 m^{2}). When it opened, the resort included an 80,000 sq ft (7,400 m^{2}) casino, with 2,400 slot machines, 60 table games, a 600-seat bingo hall, and a 300-seat race and sports book. The South Point is popular for sports wagering. An expansion of the casino was opened in July 2010. It included additional slot machines, a larger poker room, and a redesigned race book, now separate from the sportsbook. It is the only casino in Las Vegas to have separate book facilities, due to a difference in demographics. Gaughan also had some slot machines altered to pay out more money. The Vegas Stats & Information Network opened a broadcasting studio at the South Point in February 2017, adjacent to the race and sports book. VSiN moved out in September 2023, and the area was repurposed as the South Point Studios, offering programming from South Point bookmakers and professional gamblers.

The hotel stands at 25 stories, and includes 2,163 rooms. It originally opened with 652 rooms. The second tower, finished in 2006, brought the total to 1,333. As of 2007, approximately 30 percent of hotel occupancy was related to conventions held at the resort, necessitating the need for more rooms. The third tower, with 830 rooms, was completed in July 2008, bringing the room total to 2,163. The South Point became the largest locals' hotel in Las Vegas.

A 16-screen Century Theatres was built on the South Coast's second floor. Some interior space, located beneath the theater facility, was left vacant for future expansion of other amenities. The resort initially had 150,000 sq ft (14,000 m^{2}) of convention space, more than any other Coast casino. The 2007 expansion added 10,000 sq ft (930 m^{2}) of new conference space to deal with demand. An entertainment area, known as the Grandview Lounge, was added in the resort's 2010 expansion. It was named after the adjacent Grandview timeshare property. The resort also has a 40,000 sq ft (3,700 m^{2}) spa, which received a $500,000 renovation in 2012.

=== Equestrian center ===
The resort includes an equestrian facility known as South Point Arena, Equestrian Center and Exhibit Hall. It is also known as South Point Equestrian Complex and Arena, and South Point Arena.

It opened as the South Coast Equestrian Center in February 2006. It served as a signature attraction for the resort, and was the first such facility in the United States to be connected to a hotel. It includes 4,400 seats and 1,600 horse stalls. The equestrian center was devised by Gaughan, a horse lover whose family participated in horse events. The facility was expected to host up to 40 horse events each year, and Gaughan believed that it would attract a higher-end clientele. The idea was initially met with skepticism, but the facility would go on to be successful.

The equestrian center became popular for its western events such as rodeo riding, and has also hosted other events such as concerts, boxing matches, college basketball tournaments, and Mecum Auctions. Since 2012, the equestrian center has also hosted The Vegas Shoot, an annual archery competition that attracts over 3,000 competitors annually and ranks as one of the most prestigious indoor archery tournaments in the world.

A bronze statue of gambler Benny Binion, riding a horse, was relocated from downtown Las Vegas to the equestrian center in 2008.

Priefert Pavilion, an expansion to the equestrian center, began construction in 2013, and opened the following year. It was a joint venture between the South Point and rodeo equipment company Priefert Manufacturing. New video displays were installed in 2018.

=== Bowling ===
The resort opened with a 64-lane bowling center. The facility became host to the Professional Bowlers Association and its PBA World Series of Bowling.

The property also includes the Tournament Bowling Plaza, which is used solely for tournament play. The 90,000 sq ft (8,400 m^{2}) facility includes 60 lanes and a 720-unit locker room. Construction on the new facility began in 2013, and it opened in November 2014. The United States Bowling Congress holds events at the facility, which is located on the second floor of the Priefert Pavilion. It is separate from the resort's original bowling alley.

=== Restaurants ===
The South Coast opened with six restaurants, including the biggest buffet of any Coast casino. After Gaughan took over ownership, he added a popular sportsbook hot dog cart, with hot dogs still priced, in 2026, at just at a $1.59, an idea carried over from his Barbary Coast hotel-casino. In 2007, Gaughan also relocated his restaurant, Michael's, from the Barbary Coast to the South Point. The restaurant is closely modeled after the original location, and is popular for its old Las Vegas feel. Baja Miguel's, a Mexican restaurant, was relocated to the second floor to make way for Michael's. New restaurants were added in 2010, including a Steak 'n Shake. It was the first location to open in the western United States. As of 2015, the resort had 11 restaurants.

== Entertainers ==
The South Point has a 400-seat showroom. Clint Black was the first major entertainer to perform at the resort, in February 2006. Other notable entertainers have included comedians Ralphie May, Jerry Lewis, and Rob Schneider. The Righteous Brothers began a residency in 2021.

== Television history ==
- During 2006 and 2007, the casino served as the venue for two poker programs: Poker After Dark, and the third and fourth season of High Stakes Poker.
- The South Point was the host site for the Jerry Lewis MDA Telethon from 2006 through 2011.
- A sports talk show, The Linemakers, began filming at the South Point in 2011. It was shot in the sports book and the Del Mar Lounge, and aired on Velocity.
- Vegas Stripped, a six-episode reality television series on the Travel Channel, also filmed at the South Point during 2011, and aired the following year. It examined behind-the-scenes operations and management of the South Point.

== See also ==
- The Grandview at Las Vegas
