= Blonde Dynamite =

1950 film by William Beaudine

- Theatrical poster
- Directed by: William Beaudine
- Written by: Charles R. Marion
- Produced by: Jan Grippo
- Starring: Leo Gorcey; Huntz Hall; Gabriel Dell; David Gorcey; William Benedict
- Cinematography: Marcel LePicard
- Edited by: William Austin
- Music by: Edward J. Kay
- Distributed by: Monogram Pictures
- Release date: February 12, 1950 (Sterling, Oklahoma)
- Running time: 66 minutes
- Country: United States
- Language: English

Blonde Dynamite is a 1950 American comedy film directed by William Beaudine and starring the Bowery Boys. The film was released on February 12, 1950 by Monogram Pictures and is the 17th film in the Bowery Boys series.

== Plot ==
After Slip and Sach are cast to the street after unsuccessfully trying to secure jobs as urbane male escorts, Slip is enraged and vows to start his own escort agency. He suggests that the hardworking Louie Dumbrowski take a vacation and relinquish the responsibilities of his sweet shop to the boys. Louie reluctantly agrees and takes his wife to Coney Island. The boys convert his sweet shop into an escort service and give the place a makeover.

Gabe, a bank messenger, has $5,000 of the bank's money stolen from him by a scheming woman working with local gangsters. They threaten to frame him for the theft unless he agrees to disclose the bank vault's combination. The gangsters take control of the sweet shop by convincing Sach that they are government men looking for uranium, but they are hoping to dig a path from the shop to the bank. Eventually Slip, Louie and the rest of the boys are pressed into service at the shop.

Gabe tells the police the whole story, and as soon as he does, the gangsters dig through the police-station floor, thinking that it is the bank, and are captured. Louie is pleased to learn that Sach did find uranium under his store, but he faints when he discovers that he only owns the land, not its mineral rights.

== Cast ==
=== The Bowery Boys ===
- Leo Gorcey as Terrance Aloysius "Slip" Mahoney
- Huntz Hall as Horace Debussy "Sach" Jones
- William Benedict as Whitey
- Buddy Gorman as Butch
- David Gorcey as Chuck

=== Remaining cast ===
- Adele Jergens as Joan Marshall
- Gabriel Dell as Gabe Moreno
- Harry Lewis as Champ
- Murray Alper as Dynamite
- Bernard Gorcey as Louie Dumbrowski
- Jody Gilbert as Sarah Dumbrowski
- John Harmon as Professor
- Michael Ross as Samson
- Lynn Davies as Verna
- Beverlee Crane as Bunny
- Karen Randle as Tracy
- Stanley Andrews as Mr. Jennings
- Florence Auer as Second Dowager
- Constance Purdy as First Dowager

Gorman plays the role of Butch in the absence of Bennie Bartlett.

== Release ==
Although Blonde Dynamite was first shown in Brooklyn on February 7, 1950, its official world premiere event was held in Sterling, Oklahoma on February 12 at a new theater built with donations from around the country after the town's original theater was destroyed by fire two years earlier. The Bowery Boys and Adele Jergens attended in person.

== Home media ==
Warner Archives released the film on made-to-order DVD in the United States as part of The Bowery Boys, Volume One on November 23, 2012.

Preceded by Master Minds; 1949	'The Bowery Boys' movies 1946-1958	Succeeded by Lucky Losers; 1950
