= Tiny Naylor's =

Restaurant chain in California, United States

- Industry: Restaurant chain
- Founded: 1949
- Founder: William Wallace "Tiny" Naylor
- Defunct: 1984
- Headquarters: Southern California, United States

Tiny Naylor's was a restaurant chain in Southern California started in 1949 by William Wallace "Tiny" Naylor and later run by his son Biff Naylor. W.W. Naylor had previously owned more than a dozen Tiny's Waffle Shops in Central California. Naylor moved to Los Angeles and hired architect Douglas Honnold to design an eye-catching drive-in restaurant at the corner of Sunset Boulevard and La Brea Avenue in Hollywood. Actor Humphrey Bogart compared the slanted canopy roof of the building to "a huge bird about to take off." The restaurant featured Googie architecture and carhop service, and claimed to be the birthplace of the Patty melt. Naylor died on August 17, 1959, while at the Del Mar racetrack. The original location closed on March 11, 1984 and was demolished. The site is currently a shopping center.

Tiny Naylor's had a sister chain of Biff's Coffee Shops, named after W.W.'s son Biff Naylor. There were more than 40 Biff's and Tiny Naylor's locations in Los Angeles and Orange Counties. In 1999 there was one Tiny Naylor's location remaining in Long Beach, California. Biff Naylor came out of retirement to purchase the Du-par's restaurant chain in 2004. Biff's daughter Jennifer Naylor, a chef in Malibu, consulted on the revamped menu. Biff Naylor sold Du-par's in 2018.

== See also ==
- Hess, Alan (2004). Googie Redux: Ultramodern Roadside Architecture. Chronicle Books. p. 222. ISBN 978-0811842723. OCLC 249477365. (previously published in 1986 as Googie: Fifties Coffee Shop Architecture ISBN 978-0877013341)
- Williams, Gregory (2005). The Story of Hollywood: An Illustrated History. BL Press LLC. p. 166. ISBN 9780977629909.
- Wanamaker, Marc (2009). Hollywood 1940-2008. Arcadia Press. ISBN 9780738559230.
- Geary, George (2016). L.A.'s Legendary Restaurants. Santa Monica Press. ISBN 9781595800893.
