= The Grandview at Las Vegas =

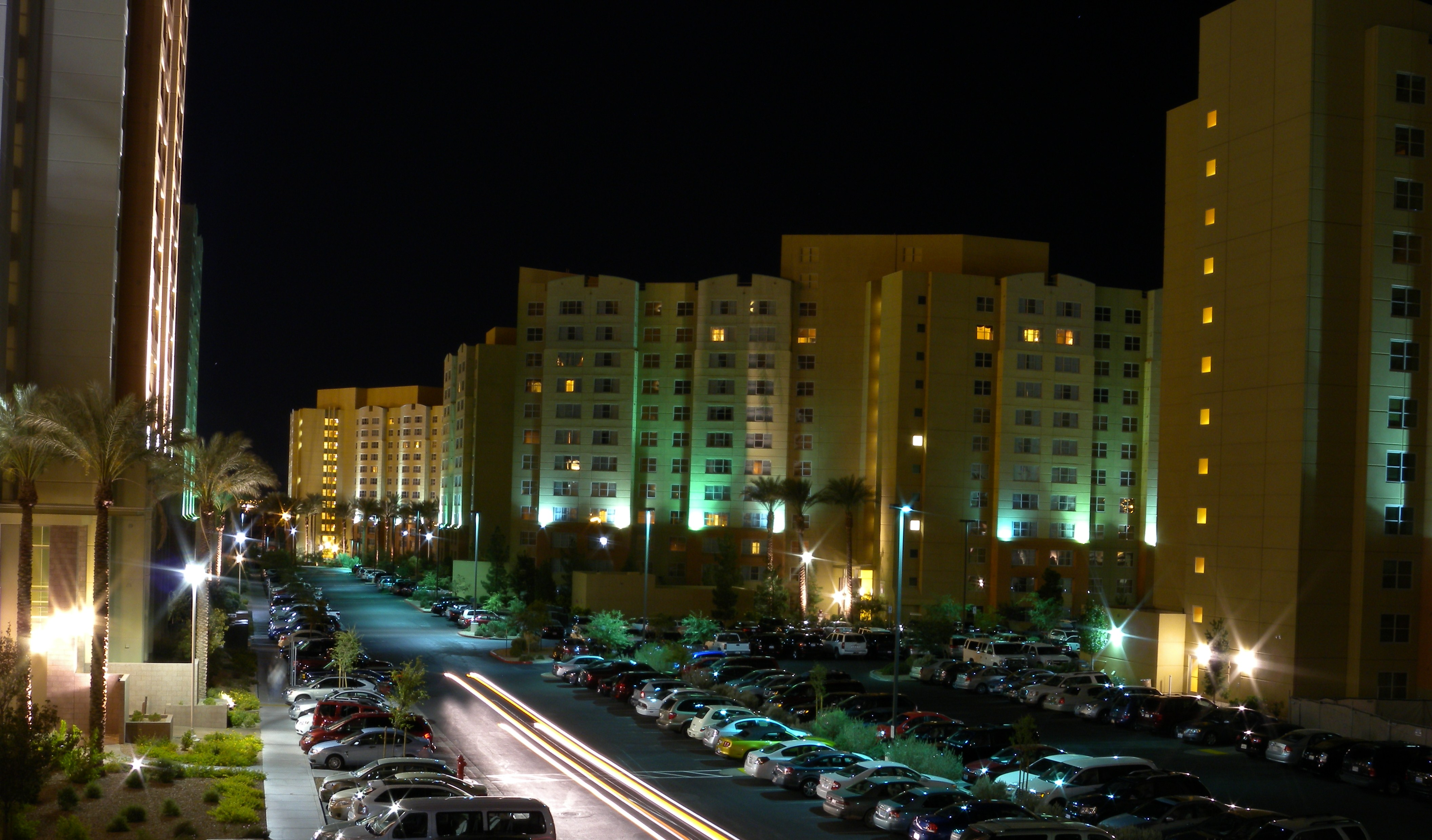
- The Grandview's towers units in 2009.
- Interactive map of the The Grandview at Las Vegas area

General information
- Status: Completed
- Type: Timeshares
- Location: 9940 South Las Vegas Boulevard, Enterprise, Nevada, United States
- Coordinates: 36.00894°N 115.17246°W
- Groundbreaking: 2003
- Opened: 2004
- Inaugurated: 2004
- Renovated: 2014
- Cost: $45 million
- Owner: Eldorado Resorts Corporation
- Operator: Daily Management, Inc. Vacatia

Technical details
- Floor count: 12-20

Design and construction
- Architecture firm: Allen + Philp Architects
- Developer: The Berkley Group
- Main contractor: Penta Building Group

Other information
- Number of units: 2,256

Website
- www.vacationvillageresorts.com/grandview_las_vegas/

The Grandview at Las Vegas is a timeshare property resort located on 26.49 acres (10.72 ha) of land at 9940 South Las Vegas Boulevard, south of the Las Vegas Strip, in Enterprise, Nevada. The property is owned by Eldorado Resorts Corporation, and consists of eight buildings, ranging between 12 and 20 floors, with a total of 2,256 units.

== History ==
Construction began in 2003, with Penta Building Group as general contractor and Berkley Group, of Fort Lauderdale, Florida, as the developer. Grandview was designed by Allen + Philp Architects, based in Scottsdale, Arizona. The project would initially consist of two towers, both 12 stories in height, with a total of 384 units. There were tentative plans to add eight additional towers over the next 10 years, for a total of 1,600 units.

As of April 2004, the project's first tower, as well as a sales building and property amenities, were scheduled for completion in March 2005, with the second tower expected to be completed four months later. A total of 300 construction workers were expected to work on the project, which would require 1,563 truckloads of concrete. In November 2004, Penta began construction on a third tower, 12 stories high with 120 units. Construction was expected to last a year, and was estimated at $21 million.

=== Expansion ===
In May 2005, Grandview's owner, the Fort Lauderdale-based Eldorado Resorts Corporation, announced that the property planned to build 10 timeshare towers over the next several years, with approximately one tower being constructed each year. The property would ultimately feature over 2,000 units, and was expected to become the largest timeshare complex in the United States. By that point, the project's first two towers, with 196 units each, had been completed and sold out, while a majority of the third tower's planned 240 units had also sold.

A 400-unit tower opened in May 2009. In 2010, the adjacent South Point Hotel Casino and Spa opened the Grandview Lounge, named after the timeshare property. By December 2010, Grandview featured 1,400 units, with 400 planned to open the following month.

Foundation work for a new 20-story tower – the first one to be built since 2009 – was scheduled to begin on April 25, 2012. Berkley Group planned for a total of 10 towers on the 27-acre property, with more than 1,500 units completed up to that point. The new tower was under construction as of September 2013, and was expected for completion in early 2014. The new tower would increase Grandview's units from 1,556 to 1,856.

== See also ==
- Elara (timeshare)
- South Point Hotel, Casino & Spa
