= Kate Mantilini =

Restaurant in Beverly Hills, California

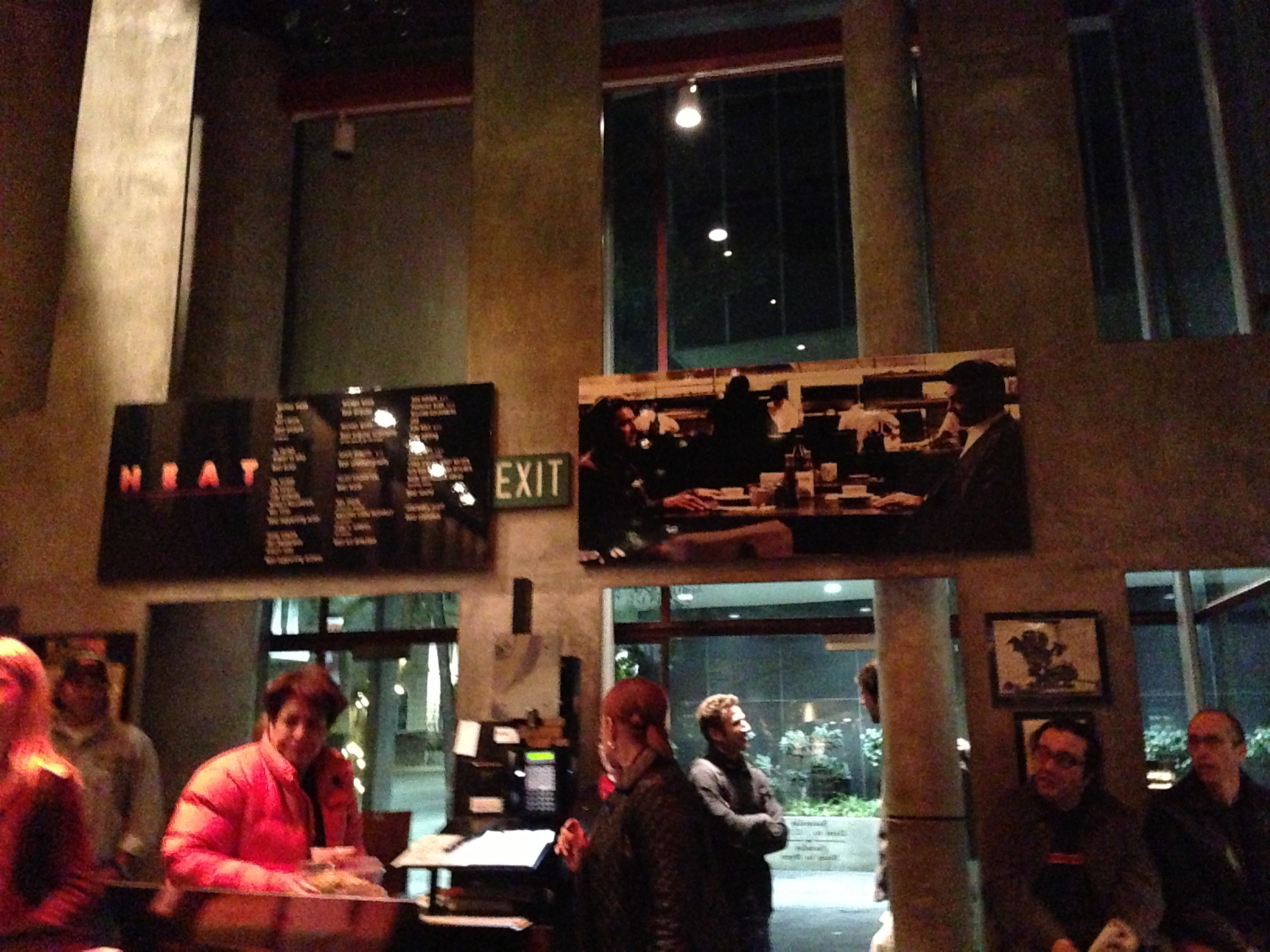
- "Heat" posters at Kate Mantilini
- Interactive map of Kate Mantilini

Restaurant information
- Established: March 17, 1987, Saint Patrick's Day
- Closed: June 14, 2014
- Head chef: Adam Lewis
- Food type: American classics
- Location: 9101 Wilshire Boulevard at Doheny Drive, Beverly Hills, Los Angeles, California, 90212, United States
- Coordinates: 34.0672037°N 118.3901544°W
- Seating capacity: 300
- Reservations: no
- Other locations: Woodland Hills

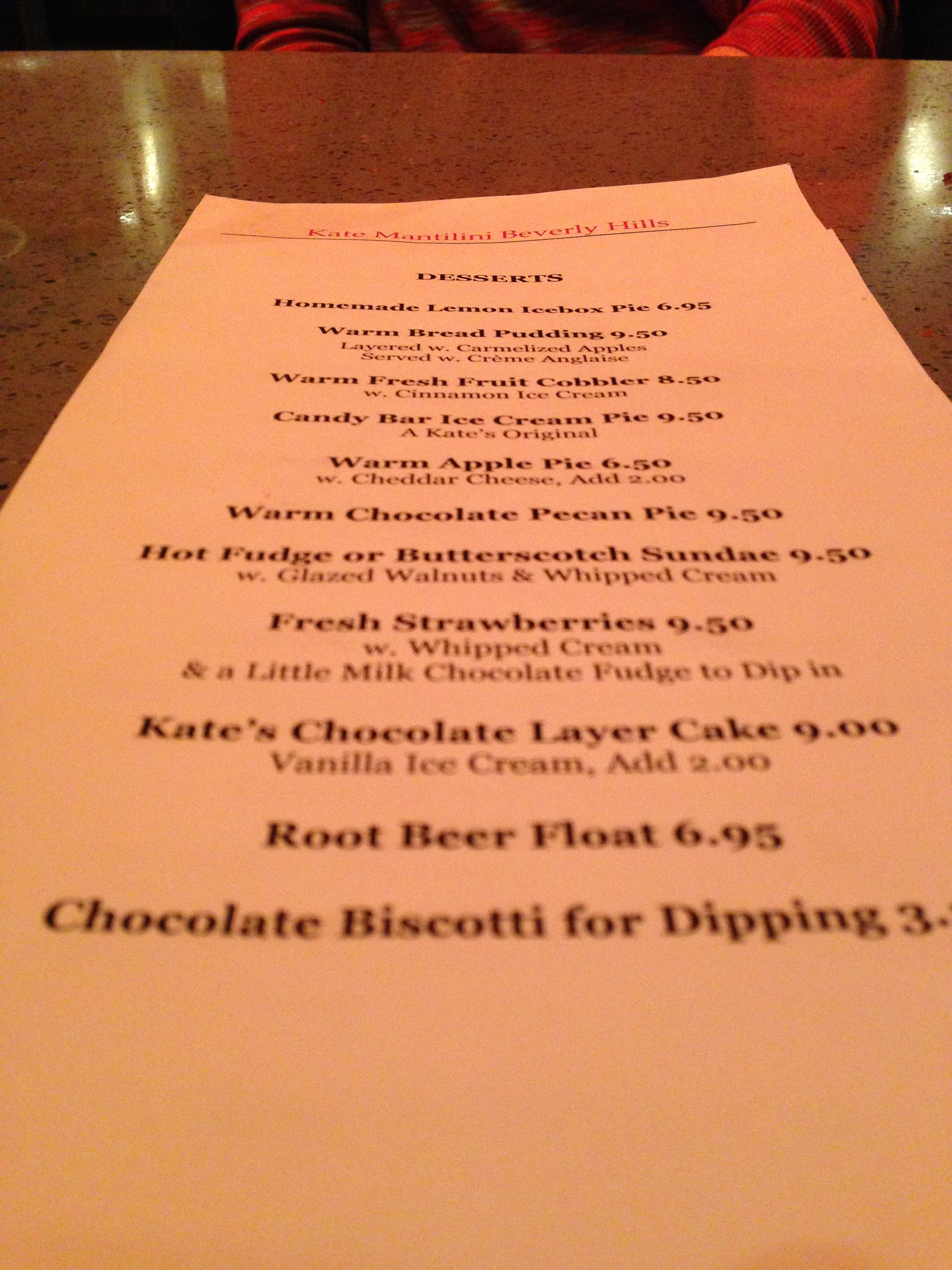
Dessert menu at Kate Mantilini, December 30, 2012

Kate Mantilini was a restaurant in Beverly Hills, California, at 9101 Wilshire Boulevard at the corner of Doheny Drive, two blocks from the headquarters of the Academy of Motion Picture Arts & Sciences. Harry and Marilyn Lewis opened the restaurant in March 1987 after selling the Hamburger Hamlet restaurant chain for $33 million. (Harry was an ex-actor who had appeared in the film Key Largo.) It was described as a "late night hot spot" and as the "most consistently cool restaurant in Beverly Hills". Starting in 2010, sons David and Adam Lewis took over the management, with Adam serving as executive chef.

Marilyn Lewis wrote about the Lewis family's history in the restaurant business in a book titled Marilyn, Are You Sure You Can Cook?

== Patronage by people in the entertainment industry ==
Regular patrons included, reportedly, Mel Brooks, Ronald Reagan, Tony Curtis, and Sammy Davis Jr. According to Pete Hammond of Deadline Hollywood:

"It was almost impossible to go in there and not run into someone you know. It was really a hopping place, both at lunch, dinner and late night. And it not only has been host to numerous premiere parties (including several for Matt Weiner and Mad Men, a Marilyn Lewis obsession) it was also prominently featured in the movie Heat with a key scene between stars Al Pacino and Robert De Niro, now memorialized on the walls of Kate's. I was even in there after the Oscars and a winner with his brand new shiny statuette came in passing up the Vanity Fair party in favor of a late night snack at Kate's.

According to Los Angeles magazine, a "representative" of Harry Lewis said that Marilyn Lewis had an uncle named Rob who was a "philanderer", and had a mistress named Kate Mantilini, after whom the Lewises named the restaurant.

== Cuisine ==
The menu stated "We thank Musso and Frank, Ollie Hammonds and Armstrong Schroeder for the inspiration for this menu". According to the "Reluctant Gourmet", an anonymous restaurant critic at the Los Angeles Times, the menu was "straightforward, huge and very American". American classic dishes served included shrimp cocktail, clams casino, meat loaf, crab cakes, Greek salad, fish, steak, broiled pork chops, rotisserie chicken, macaroni and cheese, and chili. Desserts included apple pie, cake, and shortcake. The restaurant also served breakfast and were open until 3 am.

== Filming location ==
The diner scene in Michael Mann's 1995 film Heat, featuring Robert De Niro and Al Pacino, was shot at Kate Mantilini.

== Closure ==
The landlord raised the rent on the location, which Adam Lewis stated they couldn't afford, and so the restaurant closed after 27 years on June 14, 2014, though another location remained open in Woodland Hills (5921 Owensmouth Avenue) in the San Fernando Valley.
