= Suncoast Hotel and Casino =

Casino hotel in Nevada, United States

Coordinates: 36.169044°N 115.291772°W

Suncoast

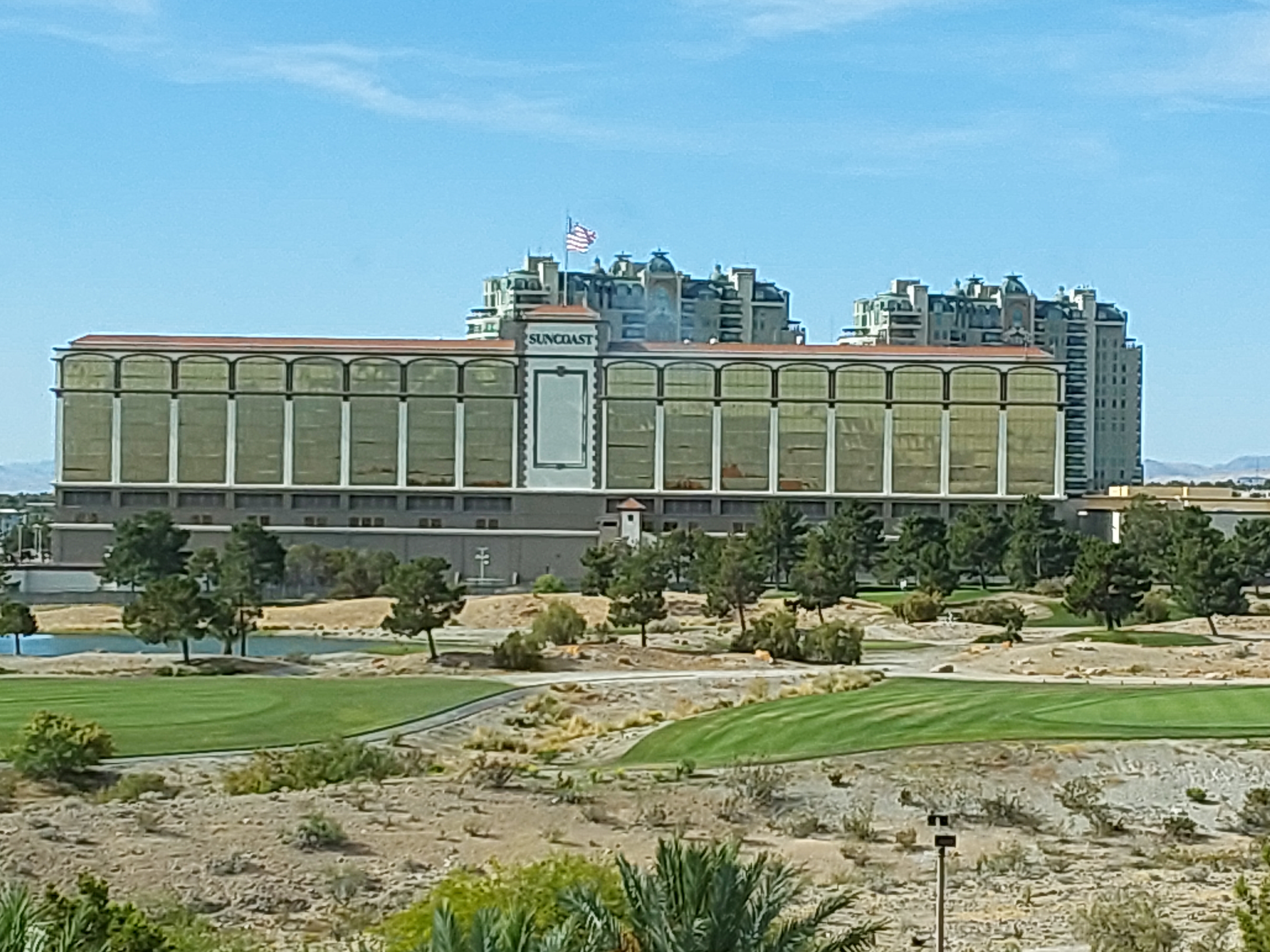
- The Suncoast in 2026
- Interactive map of Suncoast
- Location: Las Vegas, Nevada, U.S.; 9090 Alta Drive
- Opened: September 12, 2000; 26 years ago
- Theme: Mediterranean
- No. of rooms: 432
- Gaming space: 95,898 sq ft (8,909.2 m^{2})
- Signature attractions: Century Theatres; Suncoast Bowling Center
- Notable restaurants: SC Prime Steakhouse and Bar
- Casino type: Land-based
- Owner: Boyd Gaming
- Renovated in: 2001
- Website: Official website

Suncoast is a hotel and casino located at 9090 Alta Drive in Las Vegas, Nevada. It is owned and operated by Boyd Gaming. The hotel, located on a 50-acre (20 ha) site, contains 432 rooms and has a 95,898-square-foot (8,909.2 m^{2}) casino, as well as a movie theater, bowling alley and convention space.

Construction began in July 1999, and the project opened on September 12, 2000. The 10-story hotel building opened with 203 rooms on one half, while the other half remained unfinished with the potential to be filled in if needed. Because of high room occupancy rates, the other half was finished in an $11 million expansion that took place during 2001.

== History ==
In July 1998, a $145-million dollar project, the Sundance, was announced. The project would be built on 50 acres at the northwest corner of Rampart Boulevard and Alta Drive, with construction expected to begin in early 1999. In February 1999, the project's name was changed to Suncoast, due to a copyright issue with the Sundance Film Festival. The project was owned by Michael Gaughan's Coast Resorts (later purchased by Boyd Gaming in 2004).

Construction began in early July 1999. In September 1999, seven construction workers suffered minor injuries when a 32-foot concrete slab, part of the second floor, collapsed. The 10-story hotel tower was topped off on March 22, 2000, with an American flag placed atop the building. The $190 million project was half complete up to that point. Suncoast officials began interviewing potential employees in early June 2000. Many applicants had worked at the Desert Inn, which was preparing to close later that year. In late August 2000, the Suncoast had less than 50 remaining job positions to fill, out of a total of 1,800. An opening date of September 1, 2000, was initially targeted, but was pushed back 11 days due to construction delays and building inspections, thus postponing employee training. The project was built at a cost of $185 million.

=== Opening and operation ===
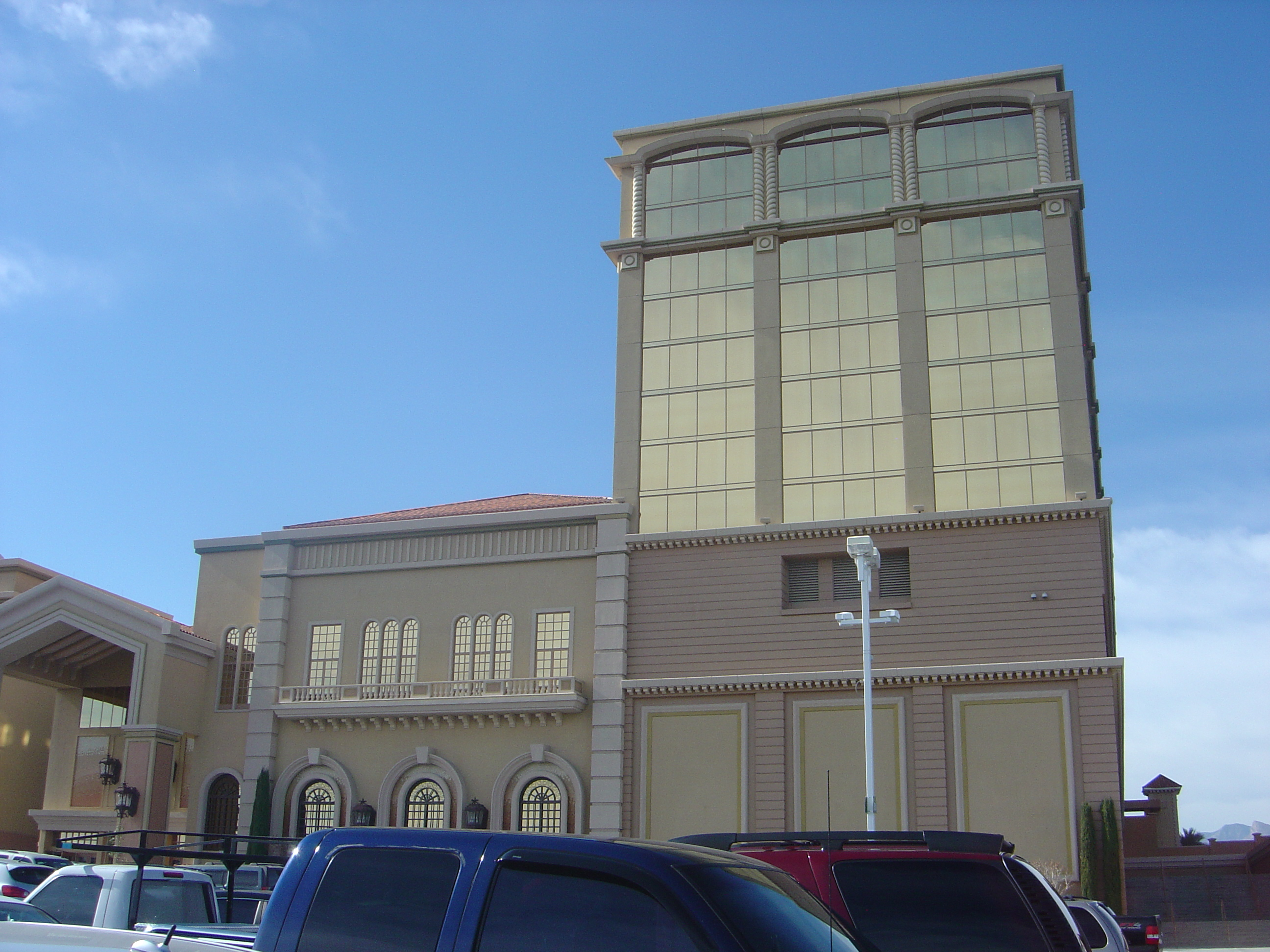
East side of the hotel tower, 2012

The Suncoast opened on September 12, 2000, with a five-minute, $75,000 fireworks show. At the time, it was expected that as much as 90% of the property's customers would be local Las Vegas residents rather than out of town tourists. The opening attracted an estimated 5,000 people. Johnny Johnson, Gaughan's college friend at the University of San Francisco, attended the grand opening ceremony and booked the first room in the hotel. The 10-story hotel opened with 203 rooms, located on one half of the building. The west half remained vacant with the future potential to be filled in with additional rooms if needed.

The resort included a Mediterranean theme. The casino consisted of 78,000 sq ft (7,200 m^{2}), with 48 table games, including blackjack, craps, Mini-Baccarat, pai gow poker, and roulette. The casino pit was overlooked by gold and purple neon lighting. The casino also included a large race and sportsbook; and a 600-seat bingo hall, which was expected to appeal to local residents. More than 2,100 of the Suncoast's slot machines, approximately 96 percent, were coin-free, with only 200 regular slot machines. The Suncoast and the Fiesta were the first major resorts in Nevada to utilize the concept of coinless slot machines, with the Suncoast being the largest to test the new technology.

The Suncoast also included a customer child-care facility with a $100,000 jungle gym, and 25,000 sq ft (2,300 m^{2}) in convention space. The resort included a moving walkway to transport customers from the 5,000-space parking garage to the casino. Century Theatres opened its multiplex, located inside the casino, on September 15, 2000. That same day, the Suncoast's 460-seat showroom hosted its first concert performance: Air Supply. The Suncoast also included a 64-lane bowling alley, with an adjacent video game arcade. Because of an average room occupancy rate of 90 percent, completion of the hotel tower's unfinished half began in early 2001; 167 additional rooms were added that August, with the remainder of the expansion scheduled for completion in early 2002. The expansion was completed at a cost of $11 million, and it brought the hotel room count up to 419.

In May 2002, Coast Resorts was planning a $65 million expansion of the Suncoast that would begin during the first half of 2003. The Las Vegas Planning Commission approved the expansion plans in September 2002. The project would add more than 100,000 sq ft (9,300 m^{2}) to the resort's ground floor, including 51,200 sq ft (4,760 m^{2}) of additional casino space. Other new features would include a 14,400 sq ft (1,340 m^{2}) sportsbook and three new restaurants. The expansion would be built east of the casino entrance and would connect to the existing building, while a three-story parking garage with more than 1,600 spaces would be built next to the addition on an existing parking lot. The project would also focus on the resort's basement, where 100,000 sq ft would be added, including 6,590 sq ft (612 m^{2}) in casino space and a bingo parlor measuring 15,500 sq ft (1,440 m^{2}). By November 2002, plans for the expansion had been put on hold.

In 2002, the Suncoast won the Las Vegas Review-Journal's "Best of Las Vegas" award for video poker, primarily because of its loose machines, which were removed the following year. In the Suncoast parking lot in August 2005, a robber shot a couple in their 60s, injuring a man and killing his wife before fleeing the area. Boyd Gaming offered a $50,000 reward for information about the suspect, and a subsequent $100,000 reward was offered by the Suncoast in 2010. The Suncoast opened a poker room in July 2006. In December 2010, a man robbed under $20,000 from a cashier in the Suncoast's poker room before being apprehended later that month. A remodeling of the hotel rooms was scheduled to begin in December 2014.

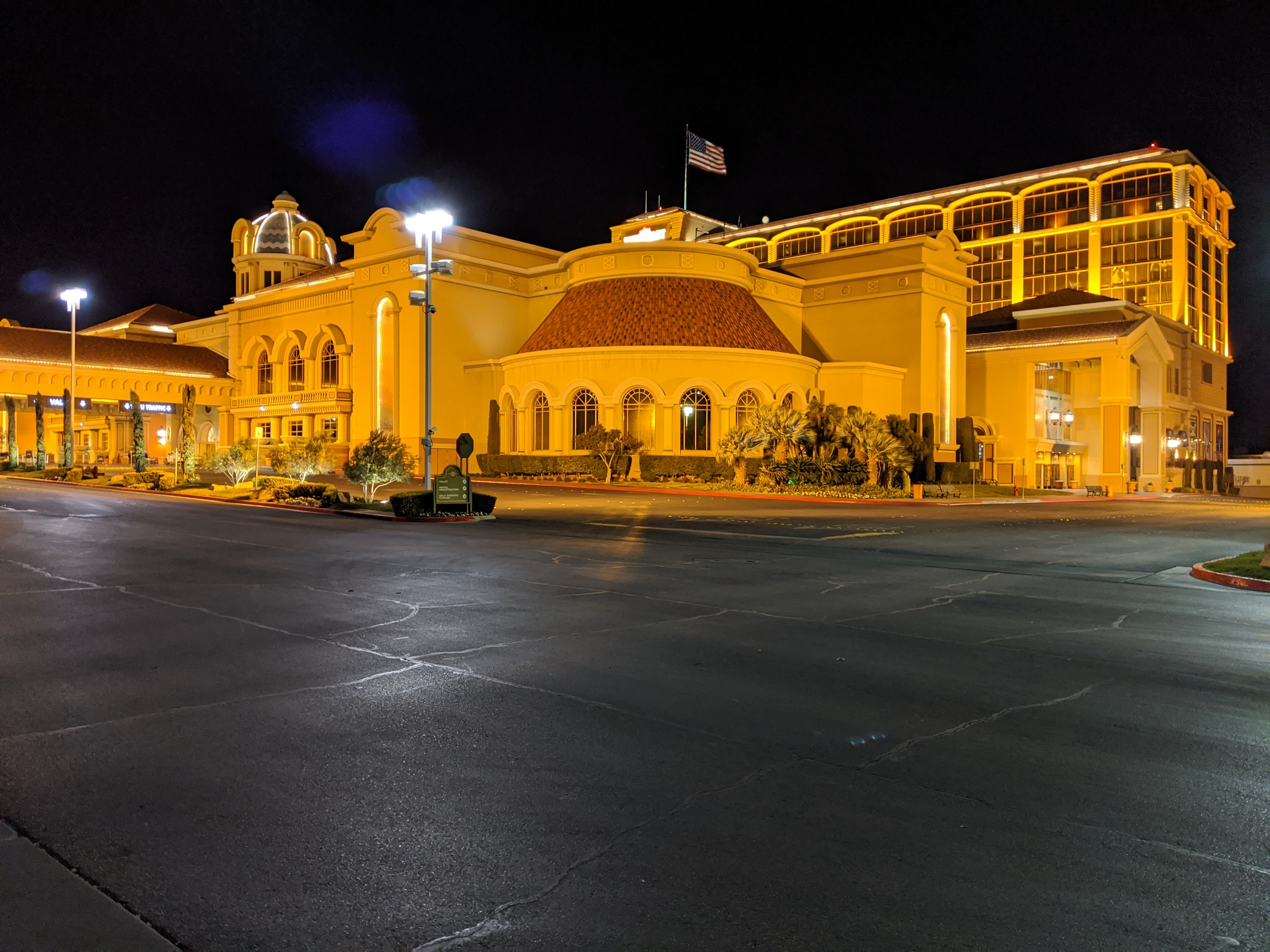
Suncoast at night

As of 2017, the casino is 95,898 sq ft (8,909.2 m^{2}). The poker room closed in April 2018. In June 2018, U.S. president Donald Trump attended a fundraiser for U.S. senator Dean Heller and spoke at the Nevada Republican Party's state convention, events that were both held at the Suncoast, while a group gathered outside the resort to protest against Trump's visit and his immigration policies. One night shortly before Trump's visit, the Suncoast was locked down for more than two hours while police investigated a suspicious vehicle in the parking lot that ultimately was deemed safe.

In October 2019, the 49-acre property was put up for sale for $87 million through an NNN lease. The sale would only include the land, but not the Suncoast itself. The land had been leased by the Suncoast ever since it was built, and the lease had 35 years remaining on it at the time of the announced sale.

== Restaurants ==
When the Suncoast opened in 2000, it planned to attract customers primarily through its various restaurants, which included the St. Tropez buffet and an oyster bar. The resort's signature restaurant was Primo's, an upscale steakhouse located on the second floor. Primo's included seating for 140 people, and provided views of the city through tall windows that were visible by all customers. The resort also featured Via Veneto, an Italian restaurant designed around a large mural made of Tiffany-style stained glass. The mural, which included a character bearing an intentional resemblance to Gaughan, had initially been created for the Barbary Coast Hotel and Casino's opening in 1979. Señor Miguel's, a Mexican restaurant at the Suncoast that was named after Gaughan, received a "B−" rating from the Las Vegas Review-Journal.

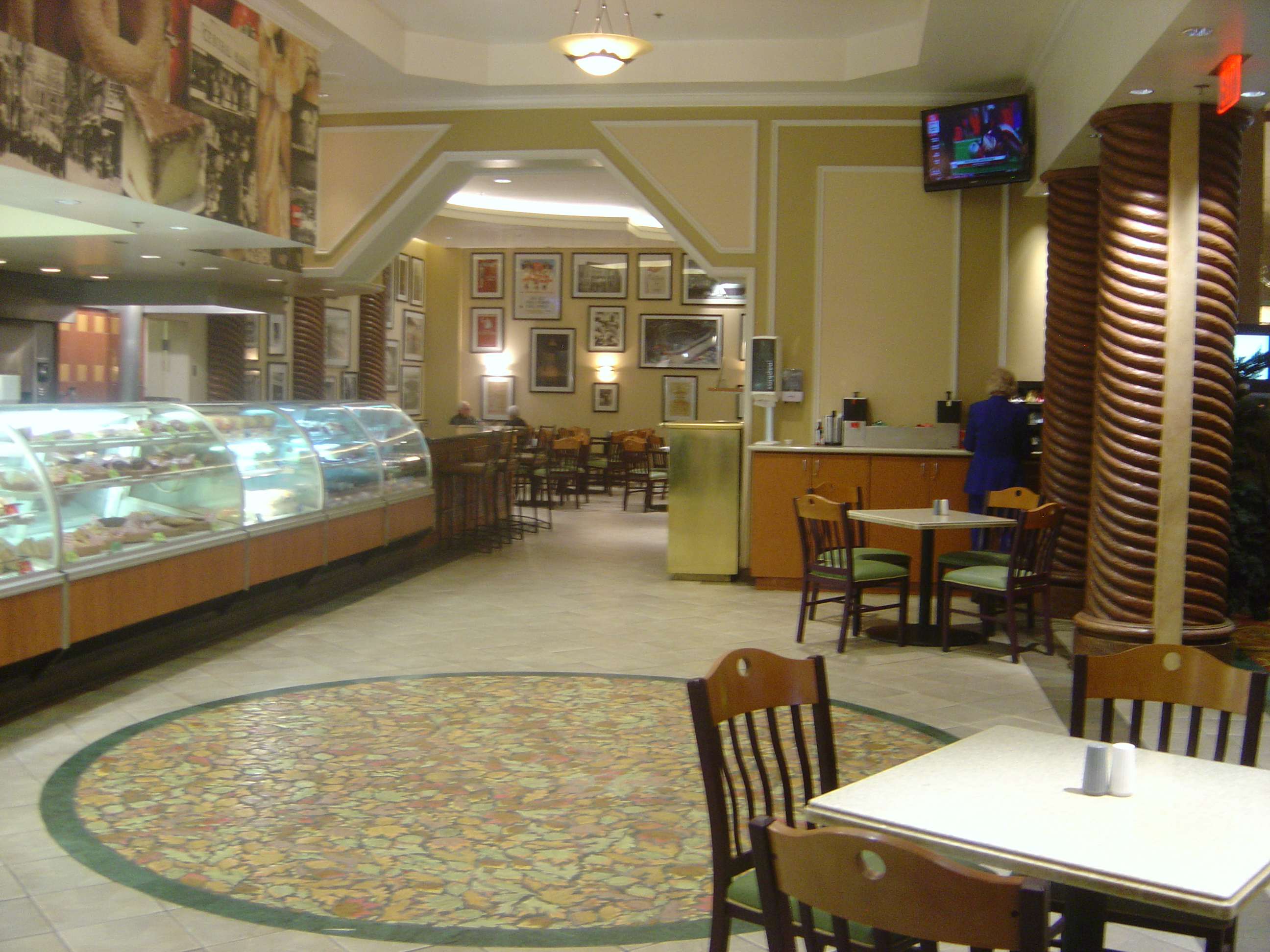
Bagel Corner deli and bakery at the Suncoast

SC Prime Steakhouse and Bar was opened in November 2008, replacing Primo's Steakhouse. A T.G.I. Friday's restaurant also opened that month, next to the movie theater. A sports-themed restaurant and bar, The Game, opened in the former T.G.I. Friday's location in late October 2014. The Game included more than 100 televisions for sports viewing, including 15 televisions measuring 75 inches. A new restaurant, Brigg's Oyster Company, opened in late November 2015.

A Du-par's restaurant opened in the Suncoast in April 2016, replacing a previous coffee shop. Du-par's temporarily closed in March 2017, allowing Boyd Gaming to take over operations and management from the restaurant's owner, who wanted to focus on Du-par's operations in California. The Suncoast restaurant was scheduled to reopen in early April. In November 2017, the Suncoast opened the 1,950 sq ft (181 m^{2}) Peng Zu Asian Cuisine restaurant. A 5,000 sq ft (460 m^{2}) gastropub named 90 Ninety Bar and Grill opened in May 2018, on the resort's east side. The restaurant, named after the Suncoast's address, included star-shaped lights that were salvaged from the demolished Stardust Resort and Casino.

Salvatore's, an Italian restaurant, opened at the Suncoast in August 2008, and included live piano music. It was replaced in 2023 by William B's Steakhouse, named after Boyd founder William Boyd.
