= Du-par's =

American diner-style restaurant chain

- Type: Private
- Industry: Restaurant
- Founded: 1938; 88 years ago in Los Angeles, California
- Founder: James Dunn and Edward Parsons
- Headquarters: Fairfax District, Los Angeles, California, United States
- Area served: Los Angeles, California; Las Vegas, Nevada
- Services: Restaurant and bakery
- Owner: Frances Tario
- Website: www.dupars.net

Du-par's is a diner-style restaurant in Los Angeles, California, that was once a modest-sized regional chain. It was founded in 1938 by James Dunn and Edward Parsons, who combined their surnames to create the restaurant's name. The original location still exists at the Los Angeles Farmers Market in Los Angeles' Fairfax District. There is also an associated franchised restaurant at the Suncoast Hotel and Casino in Las Vegas, Nevada.

== Overview ==
After 20 years of ownership, the Oberst family sold the chain in 2004 to an investment group led by W.W. "Biff" Naylor, son of noted California restaurateur Tiny Naylor (of Biff's and Tiny Naylor's restaurants) for an undisclosed amount. At the time of the sale, there were three locations: the original restaurant at the Farmers Market; Studio City; and Thousand Oaks. After 31 years, the Thousand Oaks location closed and was demolished in 1991 to make way for the construction of a new shopping center.

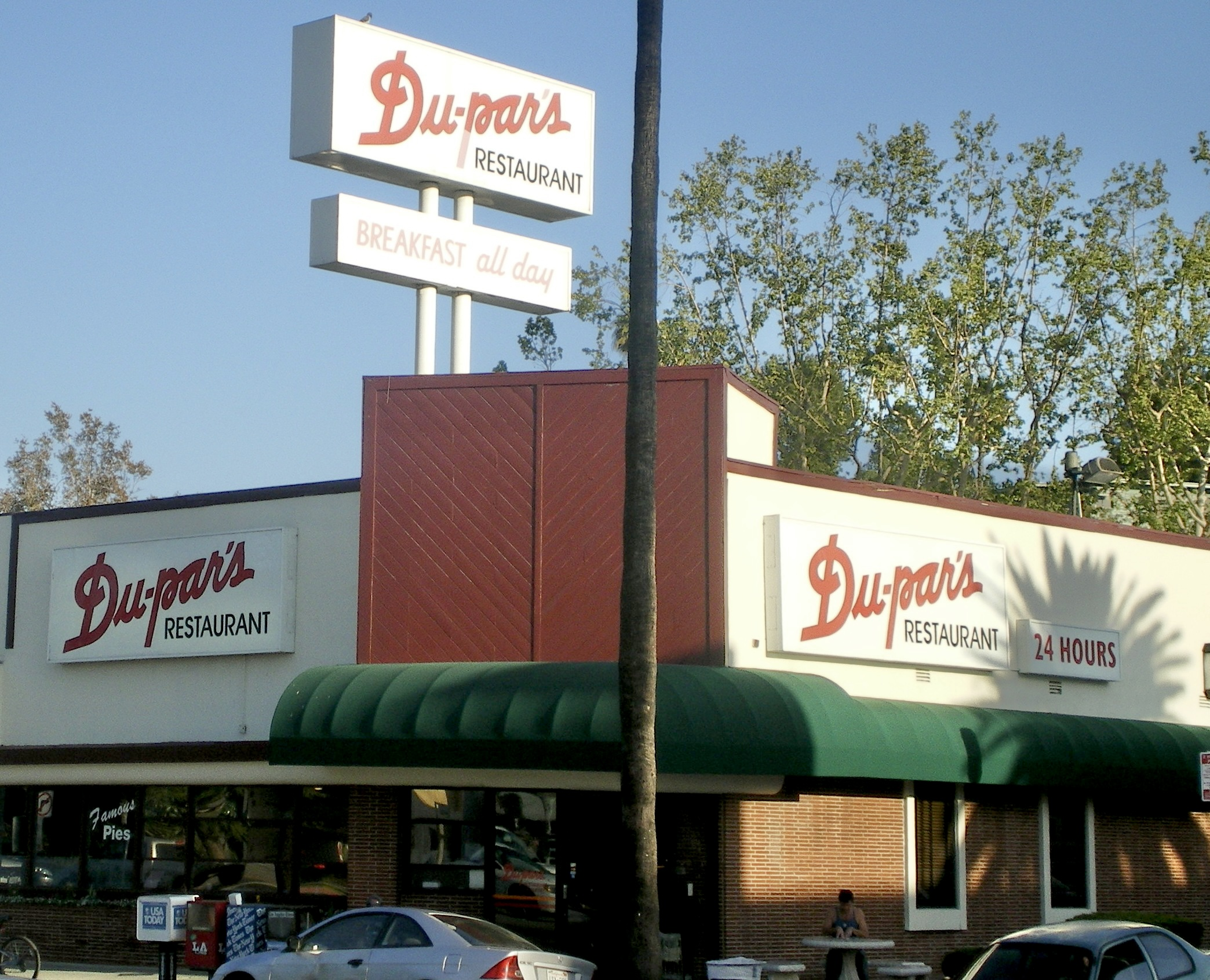
Former Studio City location of Du-par's in 2008

Du-par's expanded in 2009 to include several locations from the bankrupt Bakers Square chain. One of them, Du-Par's in Oxnard, eventually closed in August 2012.

Another was in San Diego's Midway district. It closed in September 2015 and reopened in the Gaslamp Quarter in August 2016. That location then closed in February 2017.

In 2010, Du-par's expanded for the first time outside California by opening a restaurant-bakery in the Golden Gate Casino in Las Vegas, Nevada. A second Las Vegas-area location was opened in the Suncoast Hotel and Casino in April 2016. The Du-par's Restaurant & Bakery inside the Golden Gate Casino closed for financial reasons on February 7, 2017. In March 2017, Boyd Gaming, the owners of the Suncoast Hotel and Casino, signed a licensing agreement to assume management of the Du-par's restaurant in their casino while retaining the Du-par's name and recipes.

When Naylor bought a Hamburger Hamlet in Bethesda, Maryland, in 2012, he rebranded it as "Du-par's Hamburger Hamlet", bringing the chain to the East Coast; that location however closed for good in 2013. Du-par's then took over a former Hamburger Hamlet in Pasadena, California, in 2014.

In May 2015, a new location was opened in Encino; it closed in November 2016.

The Studio City location closed on December 31, 2017.

The chain was then purchased by former manager Frances Tario in 2018. As a result of the COVID-19 pandemic in 2020, the struggling Farmers Market restaurant started carhop service to increase business after trying the idea of selling pancake batter for pick-up orders when the California governor Gavin Newsom forbade dining inside restaurants. Meanwhile, the Pasadena location was forced to close as a result of the pandemic, leaving only the Farmers Market restaurant and the one at Las Vegas' Suncoast Hotel and Casino.

== Media ==
Filmmaker David Lynch and author Mark Frost started conceiving their cult tv show Twin Peaks while having lunch at Du-Par's on Ventura blvd. A similar diner, called Double R, featured prominently throughout the series.

Du-par's was featured in the Amazon Studios show Bosch. Main characters, including Harry Bosch and Eleanor Wish, dined at Du-par's during pivotal moments in Season 4.

In Michael Connelly's 2011 legal thriller The Fifth Witness, protagonist Michael "Mickey" Haller states that he and his fourteen-year-old daughter regularly ate at the Du-par’s in Studio City.

== See also ==
- List of pancake houses
