= Biff Naylor =

American restaurateur

W.W. "Biff" Naylor is a retired restaurant owner in Los Angeles, California.

He was born in Oakland, California, in 1939 and graduated from Pennsylvania State University. His father W.W. “Tiny” Naylor started Tiny's Waffle Shops in Central California in the 1920s, and operated a chain of more than 40 Tiny Naylor's and Biff's restaurants in Southern California. Biff Naylor took over operations of Tiny Naylor's after his father's death in 1959 and was still operating at least one location in 1999. Those restaurants employed modern architecture in the Googie style, and innovations that would be adopted widely through the restaurant industry including open exhibition cooking kitchen, stainless steel counters, refrigerated pie cases, and plate "lowerators" that warmed or cooled plates as needed. In 2017, Los Angeles magazine food critic Patric Kuh called the longtime restaurant operator "Diner royalty".

Naylor is the oldest of five brothers who ran American Restaurant Services, Inc., which operated Café River City in Sacramento, California, Tiny's family restaurant in Capitola, California, and seven Cindy's coffee shops in Northern California. He became chief executive of the Hershel's Delicatessen chain, created by Denny's founder Harold Butler, in 1987.

Naylor joined the board of the California Restaurant Association in 1983 and is former chairman of the National Restaurant Association. Naylor hired Godfather's Pizza president Herman Cain as president of the National Restaurant Association in 1996

In 2004, Naylor came out of retirement to purchase the Du-par's restaurant chain. He brought in his chef daughter Jennifer Naylor, who had formerly worked with chef Wolfgang Puck, to revamp the menu. Saveur magazine wrote that they were the "best damn coffee shops ever" in their 2006 "Saveur 100" list He sold the company in 2018.

== Bibliography ==
- Williams, Gregory (2005). The Story of Hollywood: An Illustrated History. BL Press LLC. p. 166. ISBN 9780977629909.
- Wanamaker, Marc (2009). Hollywood 1940-2008. Arcadia Press. ISBN 9780738559230.
- Geary, George (2016). L.A.'s Legendary Restaurants. Santa Monica Press. ISBN 9781595800893.
- Hess, Alan (2004). Googie Redux: Ultramodern Roadside Architecture. Chronicle Books. p. 222. ISBN 978-0811842723. OCLC 249477365. (previously published in 1986 as Googie: Fifties Coffee Shop Architecture ISBN 978-0877013341)
- Langdon, Philip (1986). Orange Roofs, Golden Arches: The Architecture of American Chain Restaurants. Knopf. ISBN 0-394-54401-3.
