= Annaly (disambiguation) =

Annaly most commonly refers to:

- Annaly, a medieval lordship in central Ireland

Analy or Annaly may also refer to:

- Analy (singer), a Latin American singer (Ana Lilia Gerardo Lozoya)
- Analy High School, a public high school in Sebastopol, California
- Analy Township, a township in Sonoma County, California
- Annaly, U.S. Virgin Islands, a settlement in the U.S. Virgin Islands
- Annaly Capital Management, a real estate investment trust
