= Larry Thor =

American radio newscaster and announcer (1916–1976)

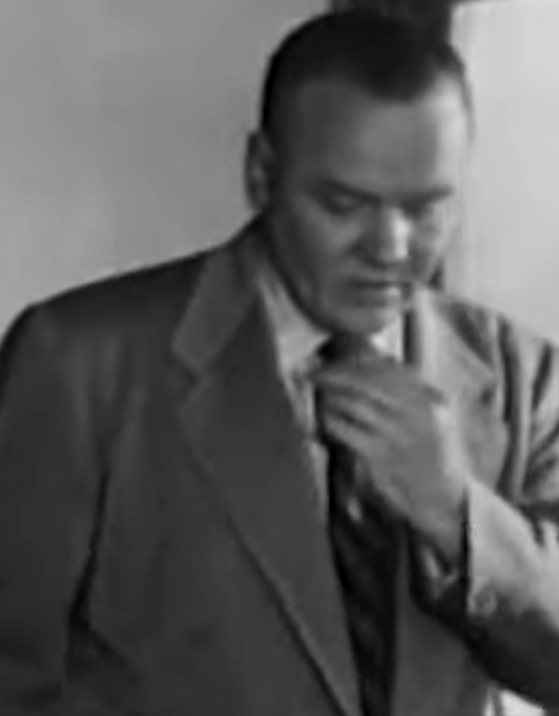
- Thor in The Fast and the Furious (1954)
- Born: Arnleifur Lawrence Thorsteinson; August 27, 1916; Lundar, Manitoba, Canada
- Died: March 16, 1976 (aged 59)
- Occupation: Actor
- Years active: 1937–1974
- Spouse(s): Leona Finnie; Jean Howell (1956)

Larry Thor (August 27, 1916 – March 15, 1976) was a radio newscaster and announcer, an actor in film and radio, and a university professor. He "was noted for his distinctive voice ... his rich resonant tones."

== Early professional life ==
A native of Lundar, Manitoba, Canada, Thor was a soldier, a construction worker, a farmer, and a rancher before he went into broadcasting. His first experience in radio came in 1937 as an unpaid singer at CFAR in Flin Flon, Manitoba, Canada. He soon became the writer for CFAR, a job he held for three years. From there he went to CKGB in Timmins as an announcer. Later, he moved to CKCL in Toronto as a newscaster. In 1946, he moved to the United States, joining the staff of KFAC in Los Angeles. Following that, Thor worked at KMPC, in Hollywood, California, as a newscaster and writer. In 1948, he left KMPC and went to KNX in Hollywood as an announcer. From 1964 to 1967 he was the radio announcer on the TV program Gilligan's Island, and appeared as himself on S02 Episode 04 Smile, You're on Mars Camera.

== Radio drama ==
Thor's involvement with drama on radio began in Canada. In addition to his work as an announcer (noted above), he began his own company, Peak Radio Ltd., which produced radio dramas. During Thor's time on American network radio, he was an announcer for Green Lama, Rocky Jordan, and Suspense. He was perhaps best known for starring in Broadway Is My Beat, playing Detective Danny Clover. He also was the announcer on the syndicated radio program, The Clyde Beatty Show.

== Recordings ==
In 1964, Thor recorded a 12-song album for children. Galloping on My Dinosaur was released on the Harmony label. Thor also wrote the music and lyrics for the songs in the album.

== Writing ==
Thor wrote his first script for an episode of Suspense. "The Man Who Cried Wolf" was broadcast February 9, 1953. He went on to write scripts for episodes of This is our Heritage, Fantasy of Fact, The Record Collectors, and Hallmark Hall of Fame. He also wrote four books.

== Teaching ==
Thor began teaching in the screenwriting program at the University of California, Los Angeles, in January 1968, offering "a special course for the advanced writers." He continued to teach there, enhancing his courses with "many professional actors, producers and writers who were brought into his class as guest lecturers" until he died in 1976.

== Family ==
While still in Canada, Thor married the former Leona Finnie of Winnipeg when he was 21. They had four children. In 1956, Thor married Jean Howell, an actress and writer. She divorced him after four months.

== Filmography ==
Thor had roles in 29 feature films, as shown in the table below.

Title	Year	Role	Notes
The Pride of St. Louis	1952	St. Louis Home Games Announcer	Uncredited
The Mississippi Gambler	1953	Captain	Uncredited
The Roar of the Crowd	1953	Announcer	Uncredited
The Kid from Left Field	1953	First Announcer	Uncredited
The Fast and the Furious	1955	Detective Sergeant	
Five Guns West	1955	Confederate Captain	
Portland Exposé	1957	Captain Vincent	Uncredited
Hell Bound	1957	Doctor	Uncredited
The Amazing Colossal Man	1957	Major Eric Coulter, MD	
Zero Hour!	1957	Vancouver Radio Dispatcher	
The True Story of Lynn Stuart	1958	Police Sergeant	Uncredited
Machine-Gun Kelly	1958	Detective Drummond	
The Littlest Hobo	1958	Police Captain	
The Hunters	1958	Captain Owynby	Uncredited
The Gun Runners	1958	Captain	Uncredited
Tarawa Beachhead	1958	Colonel Kempler	
A Nice Little Bank That Should Be Robbed	1958	Detective	Uncredited
Gunmen from Laredo	1959	Captain Garrick	Uncredited
Holiday for Lovers	1959	Captain	Uncredited
Battle of the Coral Sea	1959	Army Major	Uncredited
Wake Me When It's Over	1960	TV Broadcaster	Uncredited
Let's Make Love	1960	Wilson	Uncredited
Spartacus	1960	Staff Officer	Uncredited
Where the Boys Are	1960	Doctor	Uncredited
Bachelor Flat	1961	Officer in Sheriff's Office	Uncredited
Company of Killers	1970	Clarington	
Tora! Tora! Tora!	1970	Major General Frederick L. Martin	Uncredited
The Phantom Tollbooth	1970	Tock the Watchdog	Voice
Night Games	1974	Court Reporter	(final film role)

== Selected Television Appearances ==
- Perry Mason (1957-1963) (2 episodes)
  - (Season 1 Episode 5: "The Case of the Sulky Girl") (1957) as Police Surgeon
  - (Season 6 Episode 28: "The Case of the Witless Witness") (1963) as Commentator
- Sea Hunt (1958) (Season 1 Episode 6: "Female of the Species") as Pete Zawicki
- Wagon Train (1958) (Season 1 Episode 28: "The Sally Potter Story") as Sergeant Hood
- Rawhide (1959) (Season 1 Episode 20: "Incident of the Judas Trap") as Brown
- The Rifleman (1962) (Season 4 Episode 24: "Tinhorn") as Jesse Phillips
- The Andy Griffith Show (1964) (Season 5 Episode 2: "Barney's Physical") as Mr. Bronson
- The Alfred Hitchcock Hour (1965) (Season 3 Episode 12: "Crimson Witness") as Detective Haskel
- The Munsters (1965) (Season 1 Episode 18: "If a Martian Answers, Hang Up") as Second Man
- The Man from U.N.C.L.E. (1966) (Season 3 Episode 7: "The Thor Affair") as Announcer
- The Mod Squad (1968) (Season 1 Episode 1: "The Teeth of the Barracuda") as Doctor
