= C. alba =

C. alba may refer to:

- Calidris alba, syn. Crocethia alba, the sanderling, a small wader species and a circumpolar Arctic breeder
- Carex alba, white sedge
- Chiococca alba, a flowering plant species native to Florida and the Lower Rio Grande Valley of Texas in the United States, Mexico, Central America, Caribbean and tropical South America
- Copernicia alba, a palm tree species found in Bolivia, Paraguay, Colombia, Brazil and Argentina
- Cornus alba, the Siberian, white or red-barked dogwood, a large shrub or small tree species
- Correa alba, the white correa, a shrub species endemic to Australia
- Cryptocarya alba, the peumo, an evergreen tree species found in Chile
- Cyclaspis alba, a crustacean species in the genus Cyclaspis

== See also ==
- Alba (disambiguation)
