= Analy Township =

Coordinates: 38.39°N 122.85°W

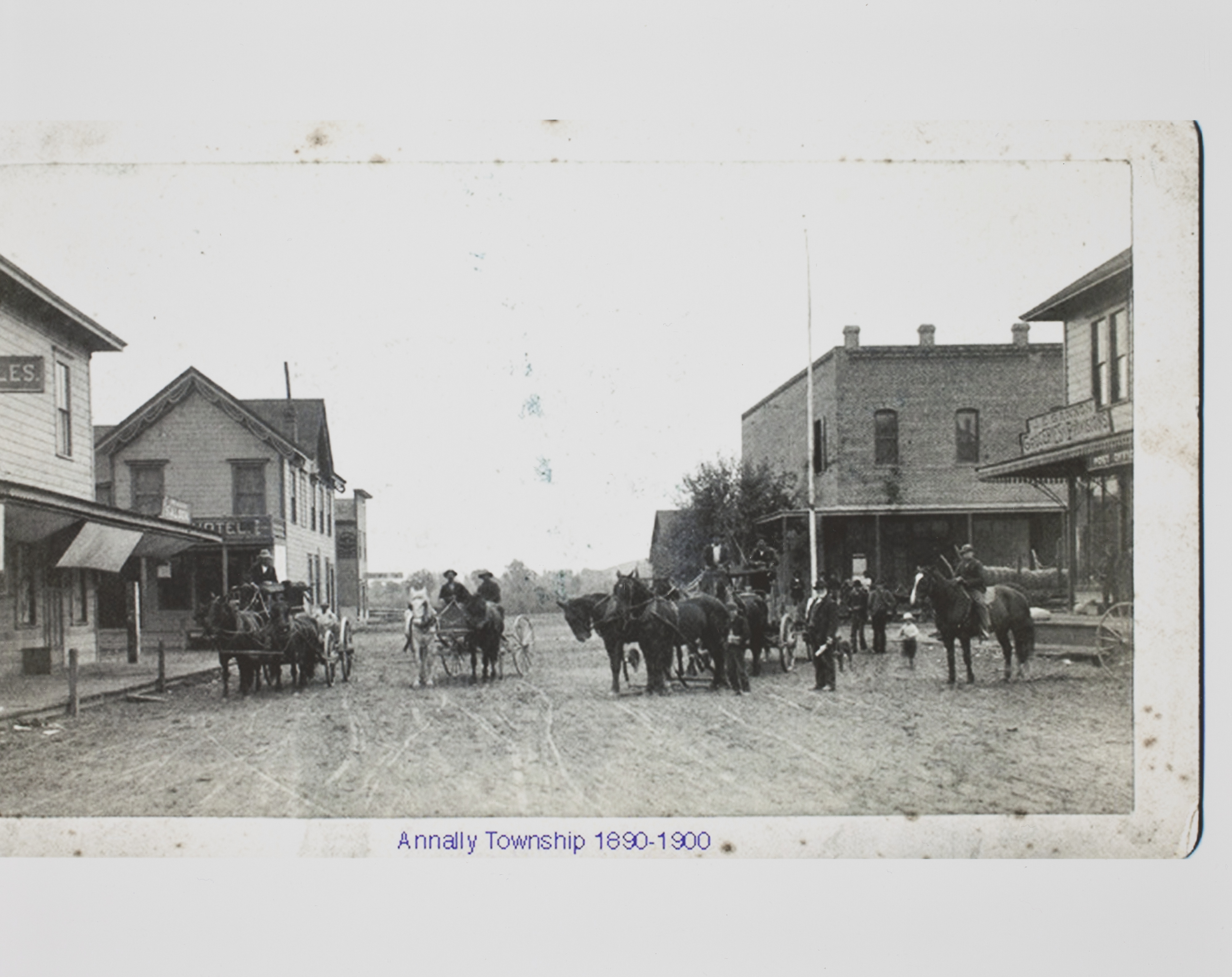
Analy Township in the 1890s

Analy Township was a 19th-century township in Sonoma County, California, encompassing land that is now the towns of Sebastopol and Forestville.

The name Analy comes from Annaly, a historic Irish lordship. Surveyor and politician Jasper O'Farrell owned the land in western Sonoma County (near present-day Occidental) that he named Annaly Ranch. After his death, some of the surrounding land was named Analy Township, parts of which were later incorporated as Sebastopol.

Analy High School takes its name from the ranch.

According to the 1920 United States census, Analy Township had a population of 6,526.
