= Mike Nott =

American football player (born 1952)

No. 7, 12
- Position: Quarterback

Personal information
- Born: May 19, 1952 (age 74); Eureka, California, U.S.
- Listed height: 6 ft 3 in (1.91 m)
- Listed weight: 203 lb (92 kg)

Career information
- High school: Analy (Sebastopol, California)
- College: Santa Clara
- NFL draft: 1975: undrafted

Career history
- Kansas City Chiefs (1975–1976); Saskatchewan Roughriders (1977); Oakland Raiders (1979)*; BC Lions (1979–1980); BC Lions (1982)*; Washington Federals (1983)*
- * Offseason or practice squad member only
- Stats at Pro Football Reference

Wesley Michael Nott (born May 19, 1952) is an American former professional football quarterback who played in the National Football League (NFL) and Canadian Football League (CFL). He played college football for the Santa Clara Broncos. He was a member of the Kansas City Chiefs and Oakland Raiders of the NFL, the Saskatchewan Roughriders and BC Lions of the CFL, and the Washington Federals of the United States Football League (USFL).

== Early life and college ==
Wesley Michael Nott was born on May 19, 1952, in Eureka, California. He attended Analy High School in Sebastopol, California and graduated in 1970.

Nott played played college football for the Santa Clara Broncos of the University of Santa Clara, with his final year being in 1974. He only played in five games total during his final two years of college.

== Professional career ==
Despite an unimpressive college career, Nott was signed by the Kansas City Chiefs due to his strong arm. He was placed on injured reserve in 1975 and did not play any games that year. He played in one game for the Chiefs during the 1976 season, completing four of ten passes for 46 yards while also punting once for 35 yards. Nott was released by the Chiefs on August 31, 1977.

Nott signed with the Saskatchewan Roughriders of the Canadian Football League (CFL) on October 2, 1977. During the final game of the season on November 6, 1977, Nott entered the game after starter Eric Guthrie suffered an injury. However, Nott separated his shoulder on a hit by Ron Estay. Nott ended up requiring surgery for his injury, which left him out of football for the entire 1978 season. Overall, Nott dressed in three games for the Roughriders during the 1977 season, completing four of 15 passes for 70 yards and two interceptions.

Nott was signed by the Oakland Raiders in May 1979. He was waived/injured by the Raiders on August 14, 1979.

Nott signed with the BC Lions of the CFL on August 24, 1979. He dressed in five games for the Lions during the 1979 season, completing 16 of 27 passes (59.3%) for 376 yards two touchdowns, and one interception. He dressed in four games, including his only career pro start, in 1980, recording 20 completions on 43 attempts (46.5%) for 383 yards, three touchdowns, and three interceptions. Nott was released by the Lions on June 29, 1981, before the start of the 1981 CFL season. He signed with the Lions again in 1982 but was cut before the start of the season. Nott played touch football during the fall 1982 season.

In November 1982, the Chicago Blitz of the United States Football League (USFL) traded Nott's USFL negotiating rights to the Washington Federals for Walt Williams. Nott had been working as an investment consultant in Surrey, British Columbia when he learned the Federals had acquired his rights. He signed with the Federals on December 10, 1982. He was cut on February 22, 1983.
