= Trevor Shimizu =

American visual artist (born 1978)

- Born: 1978 (age 47–48); Santa Rosa, California, U.S.
- Education: University of California, Santa Cruz
- Occupation: Visual artist
- Known for: Painting, video art
- Spouse: Erica Papernik

Trevor K. Shimizu (born 1978) is an American visual artist, known for his work as both a painter and video artist. His work is often described as performative in nature because Shimizu uses stories and fantasies from his everyday life as source material for paintings. Since the 1990s, he has made works that focus on self-presentation, often in humorous and self-effacing ways. He lives in Long Island City.

== Life and career ==
Trevor Shimizu was born in 1978, in Santa Rosa, California. His mother is Japanese. He graduated in 1996 from Analy High School in Sebastopol, California. Shimizu attended college at University of California, Santa Cruz, but dropped out before graduating.

He was the former technical director of Electronic Arts Intermix, through which he developed close friendships and collaborations with artists including Dan Graham, Carolee Schneemann, Shigeko Kubota, and Dara Birnbaum. He worked as an assistant to artists Carolee Schneeman and Shigeko Kubota. He also supported himself through various odd jobs that became the subject of a series of paintings in the 2000s. He briefly ran a gallery space called Shimizu Brand. Shimizu is also known as a member of the band The Curtains, along with Chris Cohen. Shimizu participated in the Whitney Biennial in 2014.

His wife, Erica Papernik-Shimizu, is an associate curator at the Museum of Modern Art in New York City, in the media & performance department.

=== Video paintings ===
Shimizu made a cycle of video works from 1996 to 2020 that have been presented publicly as his "Video Paintings," because they developed in parallel with his painting practice, and were often installed as video monitors on top of abstract oil paintings.
