= Yuen Hop =

US Army soldier (1924–1944)

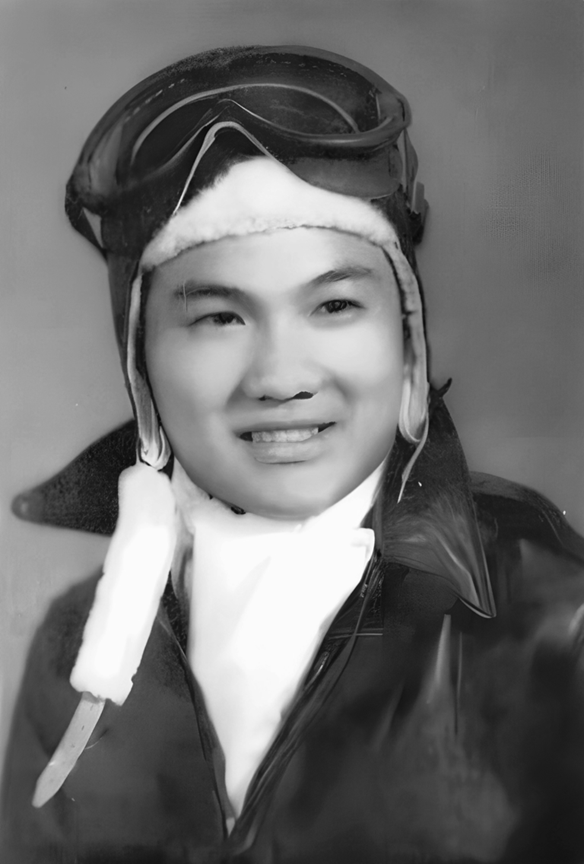
- Portrait of Staff Sergeant Yuen Hop, c. 1940s
- Born: July 1, 1924; Sebastopol, California, U.S.
- Died: December 29, 1944 (aged 20); Germany
- Burial place: Golden Gate National Cemetery
- Military career
- Allegiance: United States
- Branch: United States Army Air Forces
- Service years: 1943–1944
- Rank: Staff Sergeant
- Service number: 39-137-797
- Unit: 306th Bombardment Squadron
- Conflicts: World War II
- Awards: Purple Heart; Presidential Unit Citation; Congressional Gold Medal; Prisoner of War Medal; See full list

Yuen Hop (July 1, 1924 – December 29, 1944) was a United States Army Staff Sergeant during World War II who was held as a prisoner of war and killed in action in Germany during the Battle of the Bulge. He is recorded as one of the highest ranking enlisted Chinese American servicemembers held as a POW and killed during World War II.

== Early life and family ==
Hop was born on July 1, 1924 and raised in Sebastopol, California, the son of Gin and Chan Hop. He graduated from Analy High School. In high school, he was a member of the track team and basketball team, helping to set new records in 1940.

== World War II ==
After high school, Hop enlisted in the Army at age 19 in October 1943. He completed Air Service Command Station orientation courses in England, which included instruction on chemical warfare defense.

Hop entered the U.S. Army Air Forces in California and served in the 368th Bombardment Group, 306th Bombardment Squadron, 1st Bombardment Division in the European Theater. He attained the rank of Staff Sergeant by 1944.

== Death ==
On December 29, 1944, Hop was a waist gunner aboard a B-17G Flying Fortress with nine crew members, which took part in a large-scale bombing mission to support the Battle of the Bulge. While flying over its target, the B-17G was hit twice by heavy enemy aircraft fire. All crew members were able to parachute from the plane before it crashed.

Five crew members successfully landed and were taken as prisoners of war by German soldiers and were eventually returned to U.S. custody. One crew member was found deceased by German soldiers in the woods near Oesterich, Germany, and was reportedly buried in a local cemetery. The remaining three crew members, which included Hop, Tech Sgt. Clarence E. Gibbs, and Sgt. Homer C. Nyberg, were unaccounted for, and there was no record of them ever being held as POWs by the Germans.

In early 1945, Hop was reported in U.S. media sources as missing in action in Germany.

=== Investigations ===
In 1946, the American Graves Registration Command began investigating several crash sites from downed aircraft of the Bingen air raid. Investigations continued for several years, but by April 1950 AGRC exhausted all efforts to recover the three missing men and issued a recommendation they be declared non-recoverable.

In 2013, American and German researchers recovered documents from the state archives at Koblenz, which appeared to contain information on the loss of three captured airmen. The archive documents referenced a war crimes case which indicated Hop was captured and killed by German SS troops near the town of Kamp-Bornhofen, and buried in the local cemetery there. Hop was not officially registered as a POW at the time.

Between 2021 and 2022, research teams began excavation of a suspected POW burial site in the Kamp-Bornhofen Cemetery. The laboratory analysis and totality of the circumstantial evidence established a link between a portion of the remains and Hop.

In June 2024, the Defense POW/MIA Accounting Agency identified the remains of Hop. His remains returned to the United States in January 2025 where he received a San Francisco Police Department escort and burial with full military honors at Golden Gate National Cemetery.

== Awards and honors ==
Hop was a posthumous recipient of various military honors, including the Purple Heart, Air Medal with one Bronze Oak Leaf Cluster, Prisoner of War Medal, Army Good Conduct Medal, European-African-Middle Eastern Campaign Medal with two Bronze Service Stars, American Campaign Medal, Army Presidential Unit Citation, World War II Victory Medal, U.S. Army Air Forces Aerial Gunner Badge Wings, Marksman Badge with Carbine and Pistol Bars, and an Honorable Service Lapel Button-WWII.

As a Chinese American service member, Hop is a posthumous recipient of the Congressional Gold Medal and a Chinese American WWII Veterans Recognition Project honoree.

Hop is memorialized on the Wall of the Missing at the Lorraine American Cemetery in Saint-Avold, France. A rosette has now been added to his name on the monument to indicate that he has since been identified. Hop is also included on a memorial plaque in Saint Mary's Square.

In February 2025, the City of Sebastopol issued a proclamation honoring the life and legacy of Hop.

== In popular culture ==
Hop's story has been featured in segments on Good Morning America and in People magazine.
