= Carex lemmonii =

Conservation status
- Secure (NatureServe)

Scientific classification
- Kingdom: Plantae
- Clade: Tracheophytes
- Clade: Angiosperms
- Clade: Monocots
- Clade: Commelinids
- Order: Poales
- Family: Cyperaceae
- Genus: Carex
- Species: C. lemmonii

Binomial name
- Carex lemmonii W.Boott

Synonyms
- Carex albida L.H. Bailey; Carex abramsii Mack.; Carex luzulifolia f. albida (L.H. Bailey) Kük.; Carex sonomensis Stacey

Species of grass-like plant

Carex lemmonii, or Lemmon's sedge, is a plant in the sedge family, and is endemic to California. Carex albida (binomial authority L.H.Bailey) is now considered a synonym, but was previously thought to be a separate species; such plants have the common name white sedge.

== Description ==
This sedge produces a dense or loose clump of erect stems 40 to 60 centimeters tall from a network of short rhizomes. The inflorescence is a cluster of 5 to 7 spikes over 15 centimeters long. Staminate flowers are located mainly on the terminal spike, while pistillate flowers are mainly located in the lateral spikes. The fruit is covered in a sac called a perigynium, which is green with a white beak.

== White sedge ==
White sedge is endemic to Sonoma County, California, where it is known only from one occurrence at Pitkin Marsh, a wetland between Forestville and Sebastopol. There are fewer than 1000 plants, and likely fewer than 300 according to more recent estimates. It is a federally listed endangered species.

The colonies are scattered across 5 acres (20,000 m^{2}) of a 27-acre (110,000 m^{2}) tract. As with other plants that reproduce vegetatively by cloning from their rhizomes, the number of true separate individual life forms is hard to estimate, so researchers count visible stems; a recent count revealed fewer than 300, a decrease from nearly 1000. This sedge occurs near a rare local endemic, the Pitkin Marsh lily (Lilium pardalinum ssp. pitkinense).
