= Guayaki =

Guayaki may refer to:

- Guayakis, a native tribe in eastern Paraguay
- The Guayaki language
- Guayakí (company), a beverage company
