= White sedge =

White sedge is a common name for several plants and may refer to:

- Carex alba, native to temperate woodlands of Eurasia
- Carex albida, endemic to California
- Carex canescens (syn. Carex curta), widely distributed globally and often referred to as white sedge in the United Kingdom
