= Jean Howell =

American actress (1927–1996)

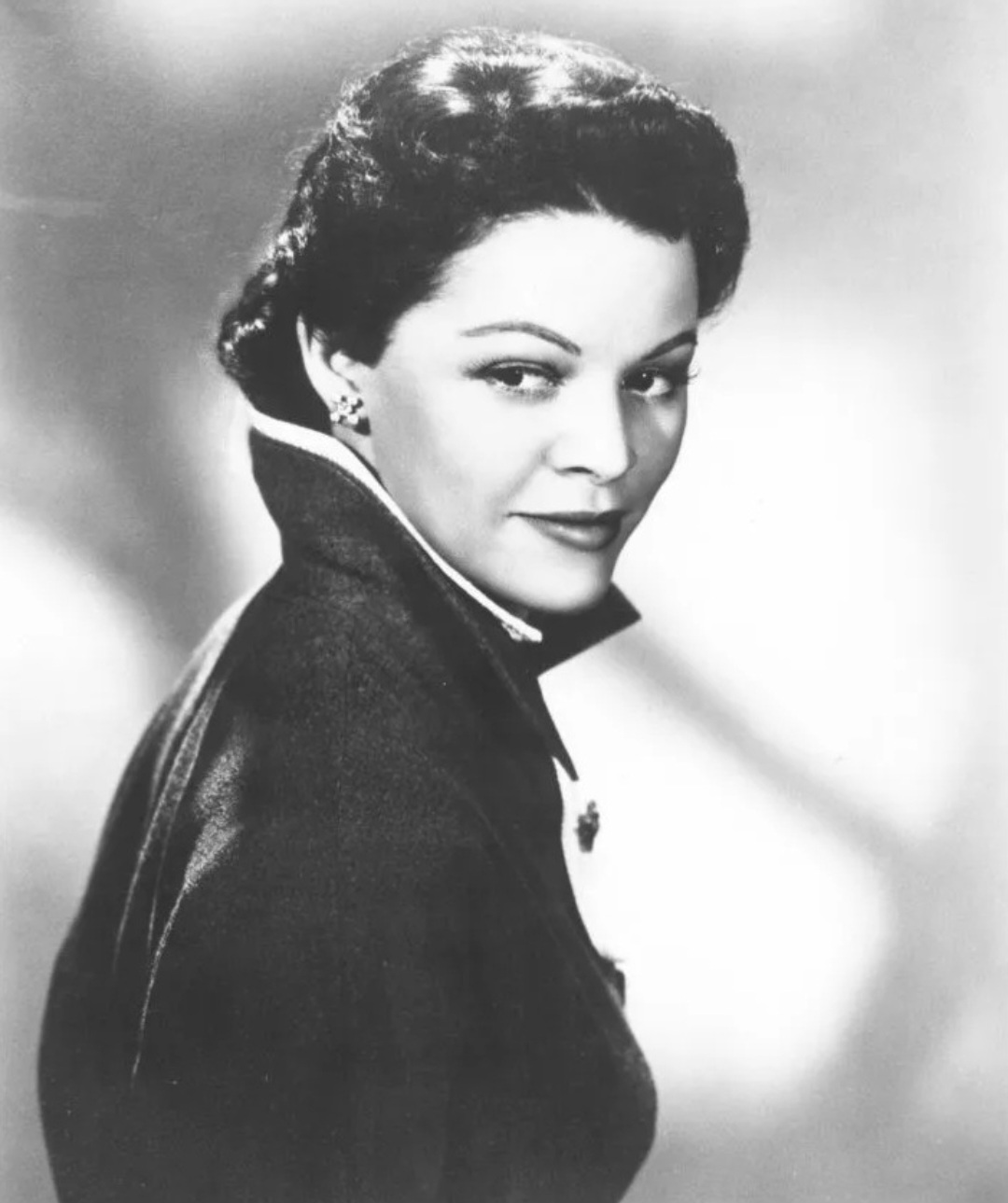
- Howell c.1960
- Born: Jean Cameron Howell; November 21, 1927; Covina, California, U.S.
- Died: July 23, 1996 (aged 68); Santa Monica, California, U.S.
- Education: University of Washington
- Occupation: Actress
- Years active: 1954–1996
- Spouse(s): Larry Thor (m. 1955; died 1976)
- Children: 3

Jean Cameron Howell (November 21, 1927 – July 23, 1996) was an American television actress. She also appeared occasionally in films.

== Early life and career ==
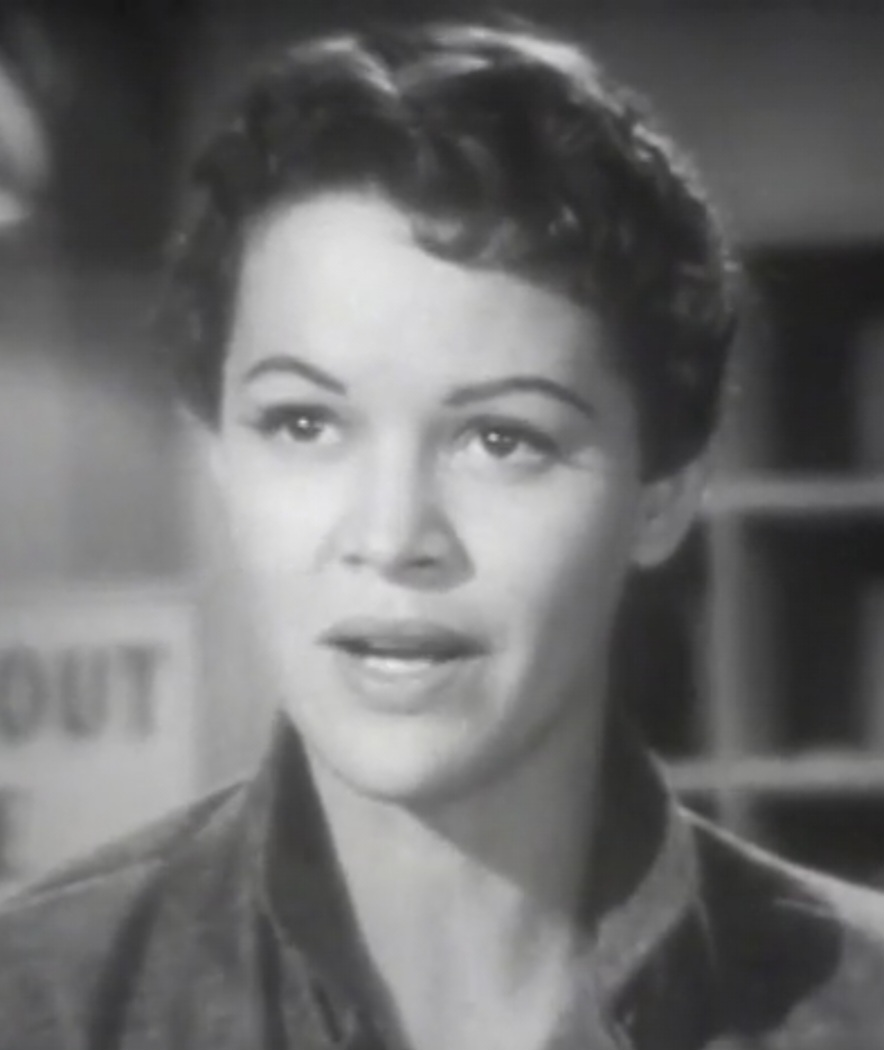
Howell in the TV series Four Star Playhouse (1955)

Born in Covina, California on November 21, 1927, Howell was the daughter of Burl Hayden Howell and Esther Hyde ‘’Buddy’’ Howell, along with her sister Dixon. In 1935, the family moved to the Sebastopol, California area, where she attended Analy High School class of 1944. Howell graduated Phi Beta Kappa from the University of Washington in 1948, following which she toured for one year with the UW Players.

On stage, Howell acted in New York in summer stock theater and at the Horseshoe Theater in Los Angeles. Television programs on which she appeared included Lux Video Theatre, The Pepsi-Cola Playhouse, Perry Mason, Dragnet, Space Patrol, Armstrong Circle Theatre, Four Star Playhouse, and Telephone Time. Her films included the 1957 western Hell's Crossroads.

== Personal life and death ==
On October 22, 1955, gossip columnist Louella Parsons reported that Howell had, for approximately three weeks, been "the secret bride" of TV announcer 'Larry Thor. Their first child, a daughter, Kristina, was born in 1958, followed, eventually, by two sons, Cameron and Eifan.

In her later years, Howell was an advocate for environmental efforts to clean up Santa Monica Bay. She gave talks about ecology and also trained speakers for similar activities.

Predeceased by her husband, Howell died of cancer on July 23, 1996, in Santa Monica, California, at the age of 68.

== Selected filmography ==
- Four Star Playhouse TV series, 1953 episode, "Trails End" with Dick Powell
- Four Star Playhouse 1954 episode, "Fair Trial" with Dick Powell
- Four Star Playhouse 1955 episode, "A Spray Of Bullets" with Dick Powell
- The Pepsi-Cola Playhouse TV series, 1955 episode, "Passage Home" with Brian Keith and John Doucette,
- The Fast and the Furious (film, 1955)
- Dragnet (TV series, 1955, 4 episodes)
- Apache Woman (film, 1955)
- Lux Video Theatre TV series, 1956 episode, "The Green Promise", with James Barton and Jack Kelly
- Hell's Crossroads (film, 1957)
- Tales of Wells Fargo (TV series, 1957, episode "The Bounty")
- Tombstone Territory (TV series, 1957, episode "Revenge Town")
- The Restless Gun (TV series, 1958, episode "Friend in Need")
- Wanted: Dead or Alive (TV series, 1958, episode “Bounty”)
- Perry Mason (TV series, 1961, episode "The Case of the Wintry Wife")
- Who'll Stop the Rain (film, 1978)
