= Forestville, California =

Forestville
- census-designated place
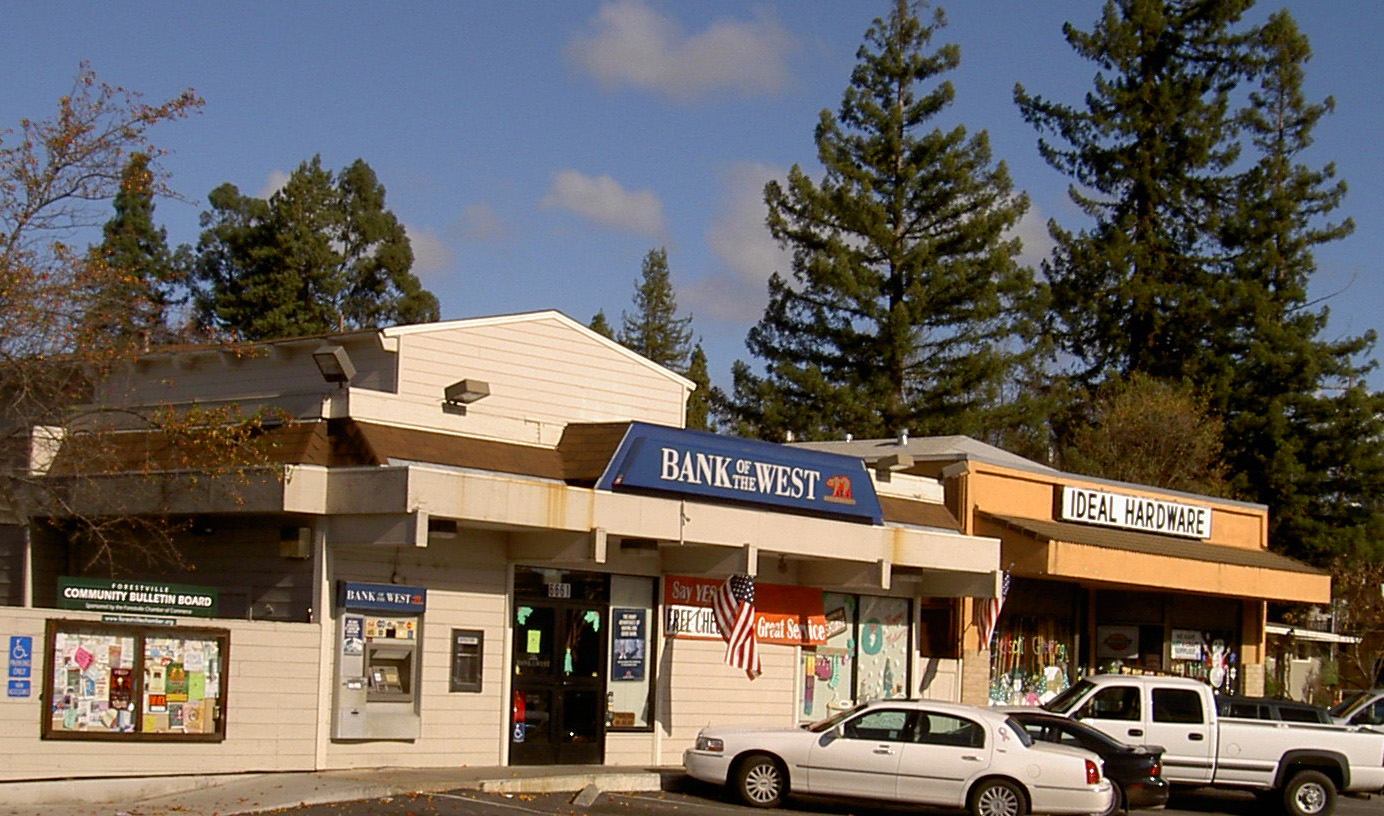
- Downtown Forestville in 2009

- Location in Sonoma County and the state of California
- Coordinates: 38°28′54″N 122°53′46″W
- Country: United States
- State: California
- County: Sonoma

Area
  - Total: 5.257 sq mi (13.615 km^{2})
  - Land: 5.257 sq mi (13.615 km^{2})
  - Water: 0 sq mi (0 km^{2}) 0%
- Elevation: 171 ft (52 m)

Population (2020)
  - Total: 3,264
  - Density: 620.9/sq mi (239.7/km^{2})
- Time zone: UTC-8 (PST)
  - Summer (DST): UTC-7 (PDT)
- ZIP code: 95436
- Area code: 707
- FIPS code: 06-24960
- GNIS feature ID: 1658564

Forestville is a census-designated place (CDP) in Sonoma County, California, United States. It was settled during the late 1860s and was originally spelled Forrestville after one of its founders; the spelling was soon standardized with one "r". The population was 3,264 at the 2020 census, down from 3,293 at the 2010 census.

By 1900, the community was known for attracting writers and artists and had a bohemian reputation. The small town has a limited number of businesses.

== History and features ==
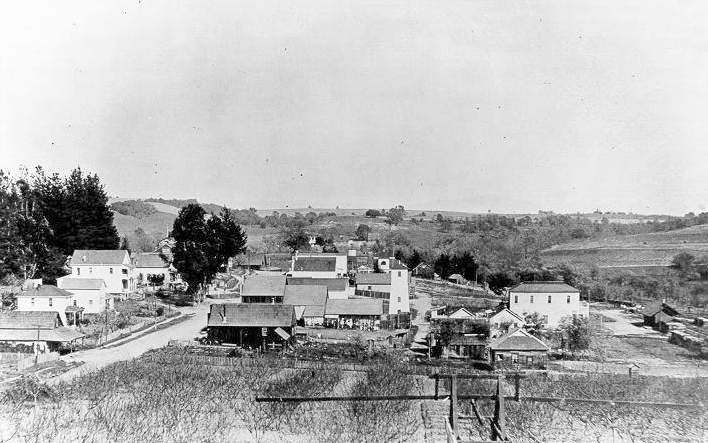
Forestville, 1909

Forestville's unofficial motto is "Forestville, The Good Life." This phrase appears on license plate holders sold at the local hardware store. The major road through town is Front Street for the length of the town, a distance of about three blocks, between Covey Road and Mirabel Road. It has been made part of Highway 116. The "downtown" blocks were first developed during the 1870s and 1880s. A fire destroyed many of the older structures, and existing buildings date mostly to the early 20th century. According to Sonoma State University professor Jonah Raskin, Forestville "was a gathering place for bohemians and writers and artists, circa 1900."

Today businesses in the town consist of one gas station, one bar, one hardware store, a grocery store, two convenience markets, a pharmacy, several churches, a number of restaurants, a post office, an assortment of small businesses, a full time fire station operated by Sonoma County Fire District, a volunteer-run Youth Park, and three ATMs. The annual Forestville Youth Park Parade is held each June as a fund-raising event. It is associated with two days of music, bingo, and carnival rides in the Youth Park. Food and handicrafts booths are staffed by local vendors and non-profit organizations.

A number of bed and breakfast inns and wineries have been developed along the Russian River and to the east.

== Geography and environment ==
Forestville is located in central Sonoma County, about 60 miles (97 km) north of San Francisco. According to the United States Census Bureau, the CDP has a total area of 5.3 square miles (14 km^{2}), all land. Near Forestville is the confluence of the Laguna de Santa Rosa and Mark West Creek with the Russian River. South of Forestville are found the endangered Pitkin Marsh lily and White sedge. To the north are the Russian River, Steelhead Beach Park, and Mount Jackson; to the west are the Redwood forests; and to the East and South are many rolling hills on which are planted wine grape vineyards and apple orchards.

== Demographics ==
Historical population
Census	Pop.	Note	%±
1880	84		—
1990	2,443		—
2000	2,370		−3.0%
2010	3,293		38.9%
2020	3,264		−0.9%
2021 (est.)	3,768	▲	15.4%
U.S Census 1880, 1990, U.S. Decennial Census; 1860–1870 1880-1890; 1900 1910 1920; 1930 1940 1950; 1960 1970 1980; 1990 2000 2010; 2020

Forestville first appeared as a census designated place in the 1990 U.S. census.

=== Racial and ethnic composition ===
Forestville CDP, California – Racial and ethnic composition Note: the US Census treats Hispanic/Latino as an ethnic category. This table excludes Latinos from the racial categories and assigns them to a separate category. Hispanics/Latinos may be of any race.
Race / Ethnicity (NH = Non-Hispanic)	Pop 2000	Pop 2010	Pop 2020	% 2000	% 2010	% 2020
White alone (NH)	1,974	2,702	2,485	83.29%	82.05%	76.13%
Black or African American alone (NH)	26	30	22	1.10%	0.91%	0.67%
Native American or Alaska Native alone (NH)	22	23	31	0.93%	0.70%	0.95%
Asian alone (NH)	38	51	45	1.60%	1.55%	1.38%
Native Hawaiian or Pacific Islander alone (NH)	4	6	4	0.17%	0.18%	0.12%
Other race alone (NH)	7	7	22	0.30%	0.21%	0.67%
Mixed race or Multiracial (NH)	62	68	201	2.62%	2.06%	6.16%
Hispanic or Latino (any race)	237	406	454	10.00%	12.33%	13.91%
Total	2,370	3,293	3,264	100.00%	100.00%	100.00%

=== 2020 census ===
As of the 2020 census, Forestville had a population of 3,264 and a population density of 620.9 inhabitants per square mile (239.7/km^{2}). The age distribution was 15.9% under the age of 18, 6.0% aged 18 to 24, 22.1% aged 25 to 44, 29.4% aged 45 to 64, and 26.7% who were 65 years of age or older. The median age was 50.1 years. For every 100 females, there were 103.4 males, and for every 100 females age 18 and over, there were 99.9 males.

The whole population lived in households. There were 1,400 households, of which 21.1% included children under the age of 18. Of all households, 46.6% were married-couple households, 20.4% had a male householder with no spouse or partner present, and 24.3% had a female householder with no spouse or partner present. About 29.4% of households were one person households, and 15.5% had someone living alone who was 65 years of age or older. The average household size was 2.33. There were 846 families (60.4% of all households).

There were 1,535 housing units at an average density of 292.0 units per square mile (112.7 units/km^{2}). Of these, 8.8% were vacant and 91.2% were occupied. Of occupied units, 75.9% were owner-occupied and 24.1% were occupied by renters. The homeowner vacancy rate was 1.0% and the rental vacancy rate was 4.0%.

0.0% of residents lived in urban areas, while 100.0% lived in rural areas.

=== Income and poverty ===
In 2023, the US Census Bureau estimated that the median household income was $105,139, and the per capita income was $51,717. About 3.0% of families and 6.4% of the population were below the poverty line.

=== 2010 census ===
At the 2010 census Forestville had a population of 3,293. The population density was 626.4 inhabitants per square mile (241.9/km^{2}). The racial makeup of Forestville was 2,914 (88.5%) White, 32 (1.0%) African American, 36 (1.1%) Native American, 53 (1.6%) Asian, 6 (0.2%) Pacific Islander, 153 (4.6%) from other races, and 99 (3.0%) from two or more races. Hispanic or Latino of any race were 406 people (12.3%).

The census reported that 99.0% of the population lived in households and 1.0% lived in non-institutionalized group quarters.

There were 1,429 households, 335 (23.4%) had children under the age of 18 living in them, 617 (43.2%) were opposite-sex married couples living together, 124 (8.7%) had a female householder with no husband present, 63 (4.4%) had a male householder with no wife present. There were 127 (8.9%) unmarried opposite-sex partnerships, and 37 (2.6%) same-sex married couples or partnerships. 446 households (31.2%) were one person and 110 (7.7%) had someone living alone who was 65 or older. The average household size was 2.28. There were 804 families (56.3% of households); the average family size was 2.92.

The age distribution was 581 people (17.6%) under the age of 18, 242 people (7.3%) aged 18 to 24, 682 people (20.7%) aged 25 to 44, 1,325 people (40.2%) aged 45 to 64, and 463 people (14.1%) who were 65 or older. The median age was 47.5 years. For every 100 females, there were 101.3 males. For every 100 females age 18 and over, there were 100.9 males.

There were 1,605 housing units at an average density of 305.3 per square mile (117.9/km^{2}), of which 70.2% were owner-occupied and 29.8% were occupied by renters. The homeowner vacancy rate was 1.2%; the rental vacancy rate was 6.5%. 70.4% of the population lived in owner-occupied housing units and 28.5% lived in rental housing units.

== Education ==
The school districts are Forestville Union Elementary School District and West Sonoma County Union High School District.

Forestville has two schools: Forestville Elementary School and El Molino High School. The high school provides 9–12 grade education to the majority of students in the Russian River area. During the 2017–18 school year, enrollment was 595 students. With the start of the fall semester in 2021, the El Molino High School campus was permanently closed and its entire student body transferred to Analy High School in downtown Sebastopol. The West Sonoma County Union High School District office and Laguna High School, a continuation school, were relocated to the former El Molino campus.

== Infrastructure and transport ==
Forestville's main road is California State Route 116, known locally as the Pocket Canyon Highway, Front Street, and as the Gravenstein Highway. To the north of downtown is River Road, itself connecting the northern part of Forestville to the coastal community of Jenner in the west and access roads to both U.S. Route 101 and the Sonoma County Airport, the closest air link with commercial service to Forestville, to the east.

Sonoma County Transit bus route 20 serves Forestville.

== Government ==
Forestville is represented by the following elected officials:

- Sonoma County Board of Supervisors: Lynda Hopkins (Nonpartisan)
- California State Assembly: Chris Rogers (Dem)
- California State Senate: Mike McGuire (Dem)
- United States House of Representatives: Jared Huffman (Dem)
- United States Senate: Alex Padilla and Adam B. Schiff

== Notable people ==
- James Walker Benét, reporter for the San Francisco Chronicle and KQED, veteran of the Abraham Lincoln Brigade during the Spanish Civil War
- Rosemary Gladstar, founder of an herbal school bearing her name
- Ben McKee, bassist of the band Imagine Dragons
- Catherine Yronwode, editor of comic books and non-fiction trading cards, author and graphics designer
