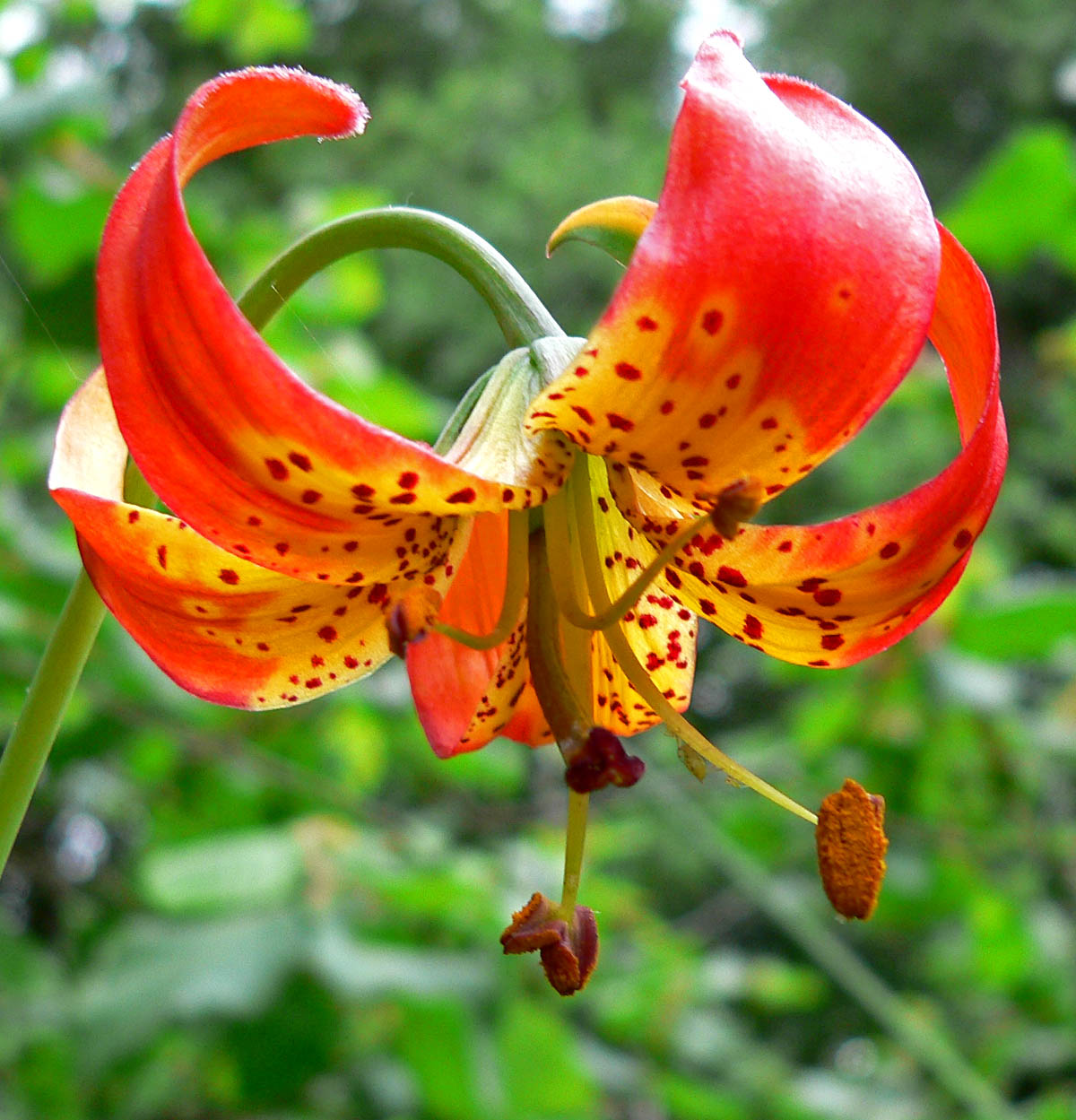

Conservation status
- Critically Imperiled (NatureServe)

Scientific classification
- Kingdom: Plantae
- Clade: Embryophytes
- Clade: Tracheophytes
- Clade: Spermatophytes
- Clade: Angiosperms
- Clade: Monocots
- Order: Liliales
- Family: Liliaceae
- Subfamily: Lilioideae
- Genus: Lilium
- Species: L. pardalinum
- Subspecies: L. p. subsp. pitkinense

Trinomial name
- Lilium pardalinum subsp. pitkinense (Beane & Vollmer) Skinner

= Lilium pardalinum subsp. pitkinense =

Pitkin Marsh lily

Subspecies of plant

Lilium pardalinum subsp. pitkinense, the Pitkin Marsh lily, is an endangered perennial herb of the family Liliaceae that is endemic to certain wetland areas in the northern California Coast Ranges of Sonoma County, California, United States. It is a subspecies of Lilium pardalinum.

== Distribution ==
Lilium pardalinum subsp. pitkinense is found in the narrow elevation range of 35–60 metres (115–197 ft) above mean sea level. The Pitkin Marsh lily is found only in freshwater marshes and wet meadows in western Sonoma County, Northern California. There are only three known colonies of this rare species in the vicinity, including the Pitkin Marsh situated near State Route 116 between Sebastopol and Forestville, California. A land development proposal has been proposed which would infringe upon this marsh, which contains a second rare plant species, the white sedge, Carex albida.

The historic range is thought to have been throughout a slightly wider portion of the wetlands of Sonoma County, with much higher densities of organisms, possibly ranging into the Laguna de Santa Rosa.

== Description ==
Lilium pardalinum subsp. pitkinense attains a height of 1–2 metres (3.3–6.6 ft). The leaves of the Pitkin Marsh lily are typically about 14 centimetres (5.5 in) long and one to two centimetres (0.39 to 0.79 in) in width. The whorled leaves of the Pitkin Marsh lily are staggered along the stem and are generally elliptical to oblanceolate in shape. Near the Pitkin Marsh, individuals are found which seem to be hybrids with the closely related Panther lily.

The plant blooms in June and July. Petals are red at their outer margins, transitioning to yellow at the centers, with small dark maroon dots. The anthers are purplish-brown.

This species is distinguished from its more common lookalike, the Leopard lily (Lilium pardalinum), by shorter petals and anthers.

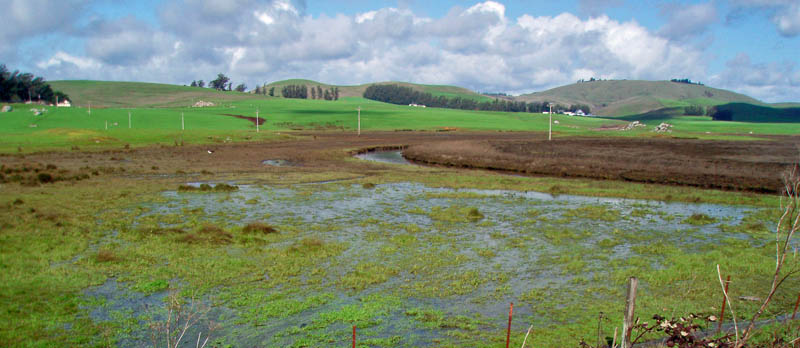
Historic habitat for Pitkin Marsh lily in the upper Americano Creek watershed, now heavily damaged by cattle grazing.

== Conservation ==
The U.S. Federal Government undertook hearings on listing the Pitkin Marsh lily as early as 1996. In 1997 this species was placed on the United States list of endangered plants, and the State of California classified the plant as California Endangered in 1978. The habitat of this rare plant has been greatly reduced from historic levels primarily through cattle overgrazing; additional losses have been sustained by collectors seeking this plant for its rarity and beauty. Ongoing threats to this species are deemed to be cattle grazing and alteration of wetlands hydrology and water quality.

Five colonies status

There are three known extant colonies of the Pitkin Marsh lily in wetland areas of western Sonoma County. The owner of the first property has denied researchers access to the colony since 1975. It is presumed that the plants still exist, but there is no confirmation of the number of organisms remaining.

The second site is the Pitkin Marsh, which was nearly extirpated by land development in 1960s, but approximately 200 plants remain. A major subdivision is planned in the surrounding area, but a "conservation easement" agreement between the California Department of Fish and Game and the landowner will mitigate in preserving this population. The recent threat to the Pitkin Marsh colony occurred when a 27-acre (110,000 m^{2}) parcel, including part of the marsh, was proposed for development as a 29-bed residential care facility. This zoning application is pending with the County of Sonoma.

At the third known site, where this had once been a common species, only two individuals remain. This loss was due to wetland filling, but was primarily caused by the collection of specimens and bulbs for horticultural use. Owners of the latter two sites entered into voluntary protection agreements with The Nature Conservancy in 1989.

The fourth site is Ragle Ranch Regional Park in Sabastopol Ca. There are several individuals but they are in decline due to being in a well traveled area of the park.

The fifth site is a forest north east of the town of Bodega. Their status is unknown.

== See also ==
- Americano Creek
