= Forestville Union Elementary School District =

School district in California, United States

Forestville Elementary School District

Location
- 6321 Highway 116; Forestville, California 95436 United States

Other information
- Website: www.forestvilleschool.org

Forestville Elementary School District is a public school district based in Sonoma County, California, United States.
