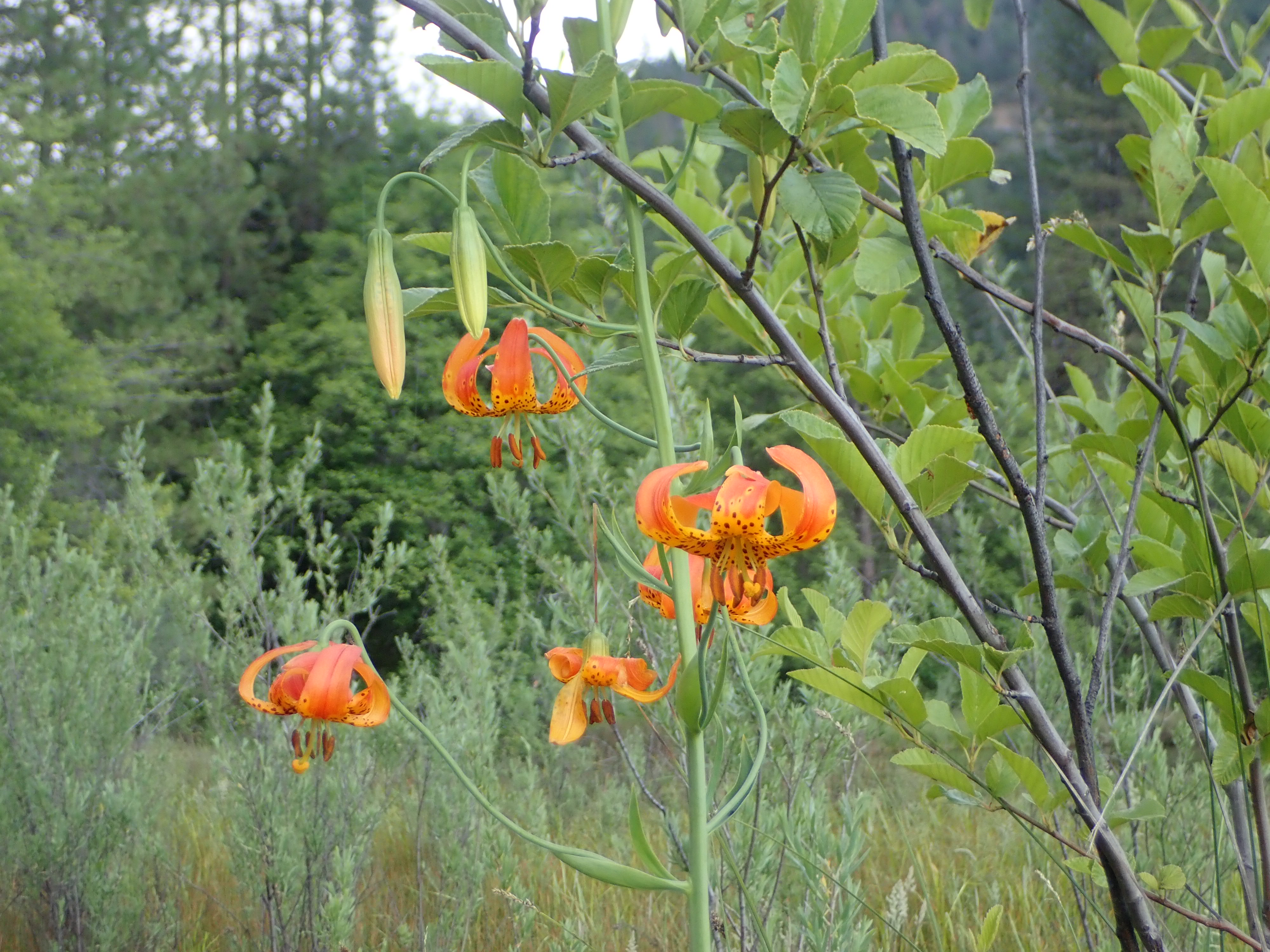

Scientific classification
- Kingdom: Plantae
- Clade: Tracheophytes
- Clade: Angiosperms
- Clade: Monocots
- Order: Liliales
- Family: Liliaceae
- Subfamily: Lilioideae
- Genus: Lilium
- Species: L. pardalinum

Binomial name
- Lilium pardalinum Kellogg
- Natural range of Lilium pardalinum, estimated with iNaturalist Geomodel

Synonyms
- Synonymy: Lilium roezlii Regel; Lilium harrisianum Beane & Vollmer; Lilium pitkinense Beane & Vollmer (syn of subsp pitkinense); Lilium shastense (Eastw.) Beane (syn of subsp shastense); Lilium nevadense Eastw. (syn of subsp shastense); Lilium vollmeri Eastw. (syn of subsp vollmeri); Lilium wigginsii Beane & Vollmer (syn of subsp wigginsii)

= Lilium pardalinum =

Species of plant

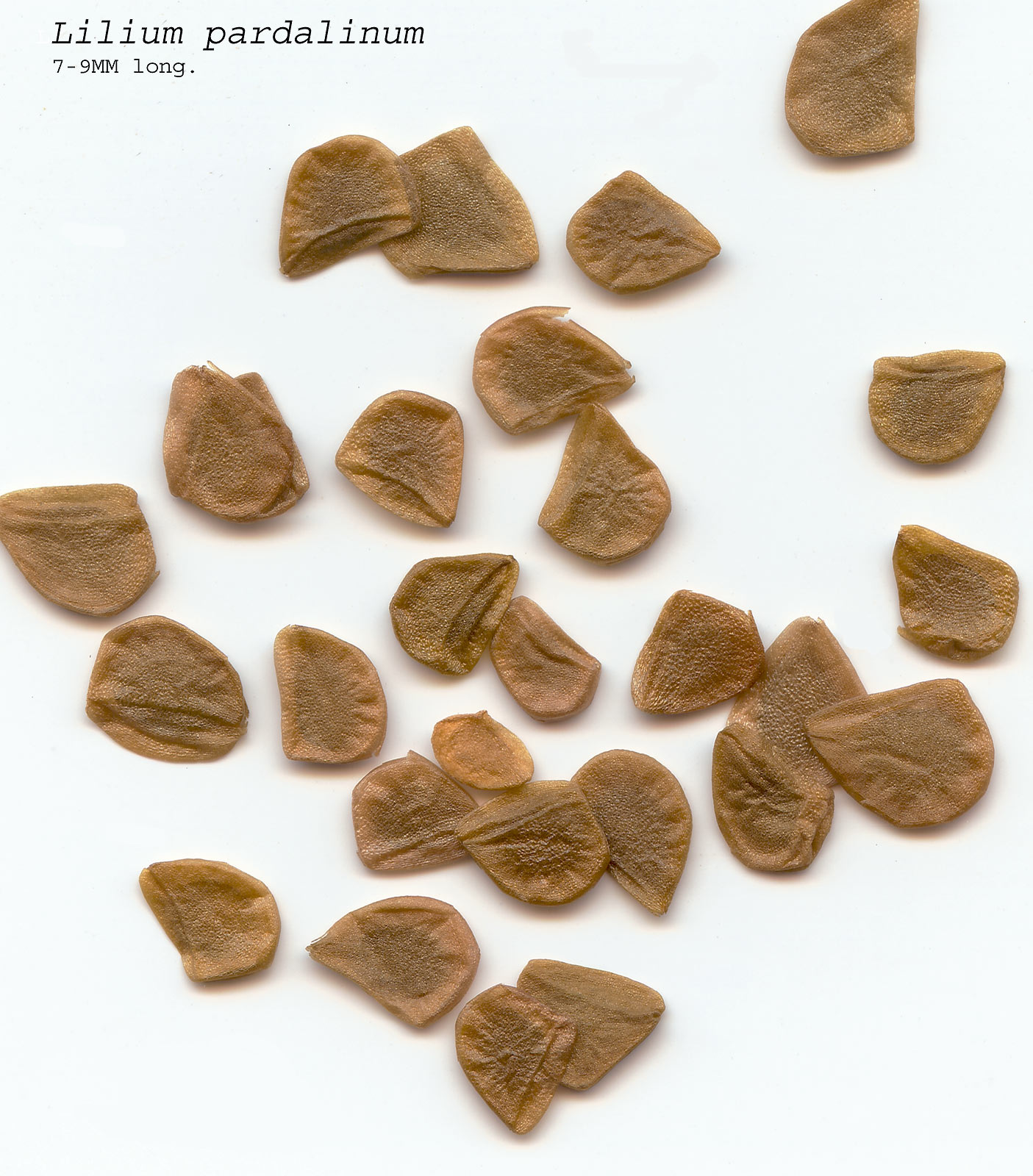
Lilium pardalinum seeds

Lilium pardalinum, also known as the leopard lily or panther lily, is a flowering bulbous perennial plant in the lily family, native to Oregon, California, and Baja California. It usually grows in damp areas. Its range includes California chaparral and woodlands habitats and the Sierra Nevada.

== Description ==
Typically L. pardalinum grows to about 2 metres (6.6 ft) high; the tallest and most vigorous plants can reach up to 2.5 metres (8.2 ft). The bulbs are small, and many are usually clustered together on a rhizomatous stock. The flowers are Turk's-cap shaped, red-orange, with numerous brown spots, usually flowering in July. It is a deciduous plant and its dormancy period is in winter. The flower color is either orange, red, or brown. The leaves complexity is simple. The fruits type is capsule.

== Subspecies ==
Subspecies

- Lilium pardalinum subsp. pardalinum Kellogg -- leopard lily - southern California, Baja California
- Lilium pardalinum subsp. pitkinense (Beane & Vollmer) Skinner -- Pitkin Marsh lily - northwestern California
- Lilium pardalinum subsp. shastense (Eastw.) Skinner -- Shasta lily - Oregon, northern California
- Lilium pardalinum subsp. vollmeri (Eastw.) Skinner -- Vollmer's lily - southwestern Oregon, northwestern California
- Lilium pardalinum subsp. wigginsii (Beane & Vollmer) Skinner -- Wiggins' lily - southwestern Oregon, northwestern California

The subspecies Pitkin Marsh lily, Lilium pardalinum subsp. pitkinense, is federally listed as an endangered species.

== Cultivation ==
Lilium pardalinum is cultivated by specialty plant nurseries as an ornamental plant, for use in native plant gardens and wildlife gardening; as well as providing height and colour in the flower border and for cut flowers. It has gained the Royal Horticultural Society's Award of Garden Merit.
