= Laeh Glenn =

Abstract painter (born 1979)

- Born: 1979 (age 46–47)
- Education: University of California Los Angeles (MFA); California College of the Arts (BFA)

Laeh Glenn (born 1979) is an American visual artist. She is based in Sebastopol, California. Her work addresses the digital life of an image; namely, how repetition and sharing influence image quality and how painting has the ability to converse with damaged images.

== Early life and education ==
Glenn received a BFA degree in painting from the California College of the Arts in 2008. She later earned an MFA degree in painting from the University of California, Los Angeles in 2012.

== Career ==
Glenn often begins her work with source material found online. Her process involves a “translation…from jpeg to painting” in which Glenn flattens and extracts elements in broad strokes from the reference image. Her paintings recall image compressions that occur when a digital image travels from screen to screen––each painting shifts in tone, texture, or scale. Artforum describes Glenn’s work as “nostalgic yet eerily placeless”.

== Key exhibitions ==
- 2020 Altman Siegel, San Francisco, CA
- 2018 Tanya Leighton (Group Exhibition), Berlin, Germany
- 2018 Tanya Bonakdar Gallery (Group Exhibition), New York, NY
- 2017 Roberts and Tilton (Group Exhibition), Los Angeles, CA
- 2016 Palazzo Fruscione, Salerno (Group Exhibition), Italy

== Public collections ==
Glenn’s work is included in the Berkeley Art Museum and Pacific Film Archive.

== Awards and residencies ==
- 2017 Rema Hort Mann Foundation Emerging Artist Grant
- 2012 Jacob K. Javits Fellowship
- 2011 Jacob K. Javits Fellowship
