= Hell's Crossroads =

1957 film by Franklin Adreon

- Directed by: Franklin Adreon
- Written by: Barry Shipman; John K. Butler
- Produced by: Rudy Ralston; Michael Baird
- Starring: Stephen McNally; Peggie Castle; Robert Vaughn
- Cinematography: John L. Russell
- Edited by: Tony Martinelli
- Music by: Jerry Roberts
- Production company: Republic Pictures
- Distributed by: Republic Pictures
- Release date: March 8, 1957
- Running time: 73 minutes
- Country: United States
- Language: English

Hell's Crossroads is a 1957 American Western film directed by Franklin Adreon and starring Stephen McNally, Peggie Castle, and Robert Vaughn. The film's sets were designed by the art director Frank Arrigo.

== Plot ==
The events leading up to the killing of the outlaw Jesse James in 1882.

== Cast ==
- Stephen McNally as Victor 'Vic' Rodell
- Peggie Castle as Paula Collins
- Robert Vaughn as Bob Ford
- Barton MacLane as Pinkerton Agent Clyde O'Connell
- Harry Shannon as Clay Ford
- Henry Brandon as Jesse James
- Douglas Kennedy as Frank James
- Grant Withers as Sheriff Steve Oliver
- Myron Healey as Cole Younger
- Frank Wilcox as Gov. Crittenden of Missouri
- Jean Howell as Mrs. Jesse James
- Morris Ankrum as Wheeler
- Eddie Baker as Mr. Feniweather
- George Bell as Deputy
- Chip Carson as Telegraph Operator
- Heenan Elliott as Mr. Morley
- Joe Ferrante as Blacksmith
- Cactus Mack as Lynch Mob Member
- John Patrick as Express Agent
- Jack Perrin as Lynch Mob Member
- Bob Reeves as Lynch Mob Member

== Release ==
Hell's Crossroads was released in theatres on March 8, 1957. The film can be streamed on Amazon Video.

== See also ==
- List of American films of 1957

== Sources ==
- Pitts, Michael R. (2012). Western Movies: A Guide to 5,105 Feature Films (2nd ed.). New York City: McFarland & Company. p. 149. ISBN 978-0786463725.
- Maltin, Leonard (2012). Leonard Maltin's Classic Movie Guide: From the Silent Era Through 1965. New York City: Plume. p. 287. ISBN 978-0452295773.
- Rainey, Buck (1998). Western Gunslingers in Face and on Film: Hollywood's Famous Lawmen and Outlaws (1st ed.). New York City: McFarland & Company. p. 96. ISBN 978-0786403967.
- Wilt, David E. (1991). Hardboiled in Hollywood. Bowling Green, Ohio: Bowling Green University Popular Press. p. 162. ISBN 9780879725259.
