= Rocky Jordan =

US old-time radio program

- Genre: Adventure
- Running time: 30 minutes
- Country of origin: United States
- Language: English
- Syndicates: CBS
- Starring: Jack Moyles; George Raft; Jay Novello
- Announcer: Larry Thor
- Original release: October 31, 1948 – August 22, 1951

Rocky Jordan was a radio series about an American restaurateur in Cairo who each week became involved in some kind of mystery or adventure. The show was broadcast on CBS from October 31, 1948, to September 10, 1950, and then again from June 27, 1951, to August 22, 1951. The character of Rocky Jordan had been introduced to listeners in a similar show called A Man Named Jordan that was broadcast from 1945 to 1947 on the CBS West Coast network, but set in Istanbul, rather than Cairo.

In February 1951, it was announced CBS was in discussions to make a TV series based on the show starring George Raft made by Raft's company. However this never happened.

== Cast ==
The two lead roles were those of Rocky Jordan and Captain Sam Sabaaya of the Cairo Police. For most of the show's history Jordan was played by veteran radio actor Jack Moyles, but he was later replaced by a movie star, George Raft, for the brief 1951 run. Of note, Moyles played a 'David Rockey' in the January 20, 1951 Yours Truly, Johnny Dollar episode "The David Rockey Matter" in possible homage to his Rocky Jordan character.

Jay Novello played Sabaaya throughout the entire series. Other roles were played by members of Hollywood's Radio Row, and the announcer was Larry Thor.

== Characters ==
=== Rocky Jordan ===
Rocky Jordan (Jack Moyles/George Raft) is the proprietor of the Café Tambourine, which is located, according to the announcer, "not far from the Mosque Sultan Hassan," though he is originally from St. Louis. During the course of the series, it is revealed that Rocky previously ran a Café Tambourine not only in Istanbul (known from the previous series, "A Man Named Jordan") but also in San Francisco and other locales.

As an American restaurateur in a North African country, Jordan is somewhat similar to the Rick Blaine character in the film Casablanca, though the Café Tambourine is apparently a much less salubrious venue than Rick's Bar. The announcer describes it as being "Crowded with forgotten men, and alive with the babble of many languages". Each episode sees Jordan confronted with a "crime, a mystery, a beautiful woman, or a combination of the three".

Precisely why Jordan is now in Egypt rather than Istanbul (as in the previous series) is never mentioned and the reason for being unable to return home to the United States is deliberately left vague, though it is hinted at throughout the course of the series that some occurrence in St. Louis prevents him from doing so.

=== Sam Sabaaya ===
Sam Sabaaya (Jay Novello) is the police captain who apprehends the criminals at the end of each adventure. Sabaaya is portrayed as a diligent and competent policeman, usually as Jordan's friend and ally but sometimes as his foil. He is an Egyptian Muslim, is married, and has four children.

=== Other characters ===
Two further characters appear in some but not all episodes, Chris (voiced in most episodes by Lawrence Dobkin) and Sergeant Greco (Lou Krugman). Chris is the bartender at the Café Tambourine, while Greco is one of Sabaaya's underlings. Greco has a particular dislike of Jordan, and invariably tries to make his life difficult, often by arresting him as the chief suspect in whatever crime Jordan is trying to solve. He's also ambitious and eager for promotion.

== Style ==
A deliberately Eastern feel was created by careful use of music and sound effects, and the writers Larry Roman and Gomer Cool took care that the characters used the names of real streets in Cairo. Much of the information the writers used for this came from a book called the Pocket Guide to Egypt that the US Army had produced for servicemen sent there during the War. The Oriental-sounding music composed for the show by Richard Aurandt is considered to be of exceptional quality.
