= Jack Moyles =

American actor (1913–1973)

Jack Moyles (June 26, 1913 – January 16, 1973) was an American actor best known for starring as cafe owner/amateur detective Rocky Jordan in the CBS radio serials A Man Named Jordan and The Adventures of Rocky Jordan.

== Early years ==
During his years in high school in San Francisco, California, Moyles played football, baseball, and tennis and sang in the school's glee club. He also had a job, which included singing, at a local radio station.

== Professional career ==
In the 1930s, Moyles worked at radio station KSFO in San Francisco, California. Beginning August 24, 1937, his program, Silhouettes, (a "daily afternoon program") was carried on the CBS West Coast network. In 1943, he was at KGO in San Francisco, from which he narrated Men of the Merchant Marine on the Blue Network on the Pacific Coast.

Moyles began working in Hollywood, California, in radio in November 1944. His activity included narrating Real Story on ABC, playing Bullface Dickens on Get That Story on CBS, and "a variety of roles on CBS' The Whistler." He also played Mel Sherwood in Hawthorne House.

In 1952, Moyles starred in Douglas of the World, a transcribed series broadcast on the Armed Forces Radio Service. Moyles also appeared in the 07/08/1956 episode of "Gunsmoke" entitled "Passive Resistance".

Outside of his radio activities, Moyles developed an impersonation routine, performing at clubs in San Francisco. He also performed in more than 300 camp shows for the military during World War II.

== Professional organization ==
When the American Federation of Radio Artists was formed, Moyles was elected vice-president. Winning that election cost him his staff job at a radio station, a development that caused him to become a freelance radio actor. Moyles called that change "the best thing that ever happened to my career."

== Family ==
Moyles married Nida Vanderbush, who was a receptionist for CBS, in 1945. They had a daughter, born March 20, 1953.
