= Guayakí (company) =

Organic beverage company

- Company type: Private
- Industry: Beverage, organic products
- Founded: 1996
- Founders: Alex Pryor, David Karr
- Headquarters: Sebastopol, California
- Area served: United States, Canada
- Products: Yerba mate, beverages, energy shots, energy drinks
- Website: www.guayaki.com

Guayakí Sustainable Rainforest Products, Inc., more commonly known as Guayakí and recently rebranded as Yerba Madre, is an organic beverage company specializing in yerba mate products based in Sebastopol, California. In addition to offering loose-leaf yerba mate, Guayakí also sells canned as well as carbonated yerba mate drinks, and energy shots. Guayakí receives American-nationwide distribution to approximately 10,000 stores, primarily through organic and health-oriented grocery stores such as Whole Foods among other retailers, as well as through online channels.

== About ==
Guayakí was founded in 1996 as a senior project at California Polytechnic State University, San Luis Obispo by Alex Pryor and David Karr.

The name Guayakí comes from the Indigenous Aché people of Paraguay, who are ancestral consumers of the mate plant. In the interest of social and environmental responsibility, the company works with the Aché people to conserve the rainforest habitat they dwell in and harvest mate. Guayakí pays the community for the use of its name.

Guayakí’s early vision included a market-driven regeneration model, where company profits would directly fund the restoration of the Atlantic Forest in Brazil and Paraguay.

Guayakí is California's first B Corporation, certified organic by USDA Organic; Additionally, the company is also certified fair trade by IMO and is a member of Fair Trade Federation, and the first yerba mate company to achieve biodynamic certification.

In April, 2021, the brand announced Stefan Kozak will step in as the new CEO of the company. Kozak is the former CEO of Red Bull North America.

In November, 2023, Stefan Kozak stepped down as CEO. Robyn Lawrie Rutledge was appointed as interim CEO after serving as a board member since 2020.

On March 21st, 2024, Ben Mand was announced as the new CEO of the company after Robyn Rutledge accepted the role of Board Executive Chair. Mand was previously the CEO of Harmless Harvest.
