= El Molino High School =

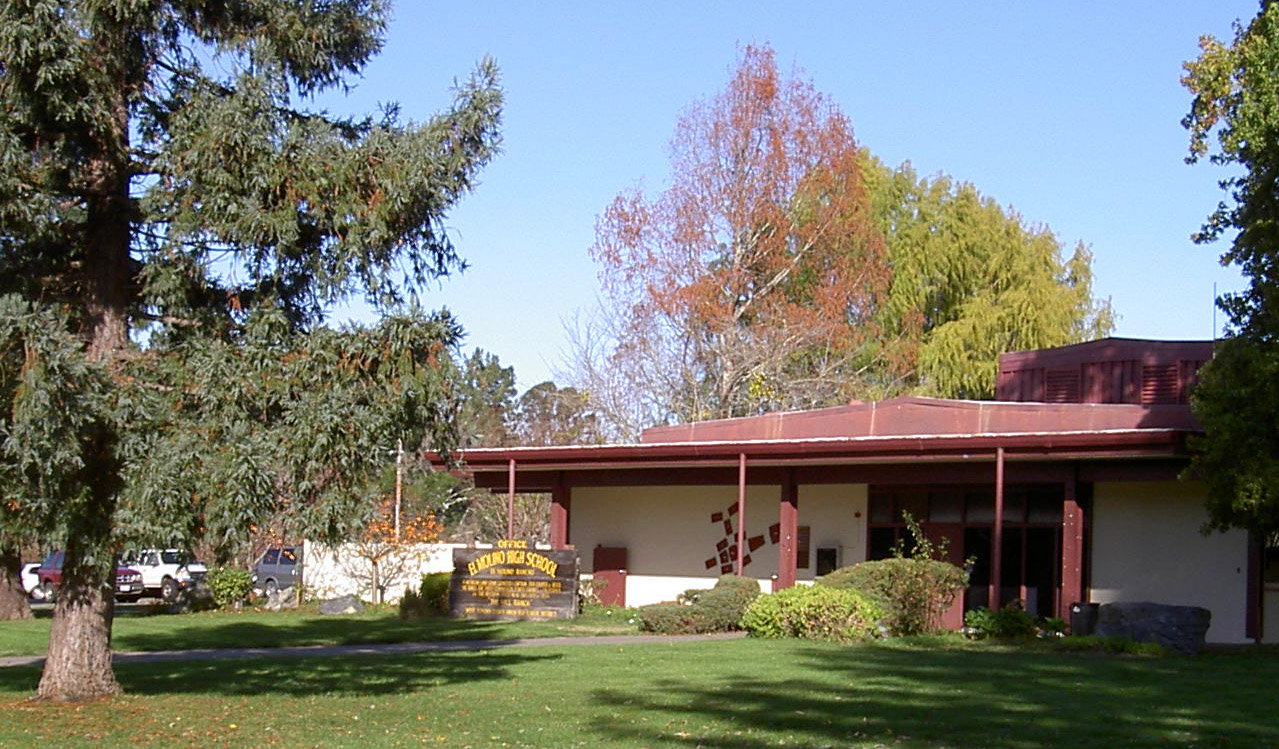

Location
- 7050 Covey Road; Forestville, California 95436; United States; 38°28′54″N 122°53′20″W

Information
- Type: Public
- School district: West Sonoma County Union High School District
- Principal: Matt Dunkle
- Staff: 30.40 (FTE)
- Enrollment: 596 (2017–18)
- Student to teacher ratio: 19.61
- Mascot: Lions
- Rivals: Analy High School
- Website: www.elmolino.org

El Molino High School was a public four-year comprehensive high school located at 7050 Covey Road in Forestville, California, United States. The campus was closed after the West Sonoma County Union High School District board made a decision to merge the school with neighboring Analy High School. The campus is currently being used for district offices and continuation classes from Laguna High School.

El Molino High School serves the West Sonoma County Union High School District. Matt Dunkle is the principal. Its campus occupies 41 acres (17 ha) of land.

The high school offers advanced placement classes (AP) in a number of subjects. The advanced placement participation rate of students at El Molino is 23%. The pass rate for AP exams is 78%.

The student demographics at El Molino are 48% male and 52% female. The total minority student enrollment is 30% with Hispanic students, who make up the largest minority group, accounting for 23% of the school's total population.

== History ==
In May 2021, a decision was passed by the school board to close the campus and consolidate it with the neighboring Analy High School. The school closed in July 2021, with the Class of 2021 being the last to graduate. Reaction by the local community was mixed, with certain members of the community feeling blindsided by the "abrupt" decision made.

In subsequent years, the school has gained traction by the local community to reopen. In December 2024, a study was done on the feasibility to reopen the campus by the Sonoma County Office of Education. As of 2024, the campus is used for the Laguna High School continuation program and school district offices.

== Awards ==
El Molino has been named a California Distinguished School five times: in 1988, 1992, 2001, 2009, and 2015.

== Notable alumni ==
- Ben McKee (class of 2003) Bass player and cofounder of Imagine Dragons.
- Jason Lane (Class of 1995), Former Major League Baseball outfielder and now coach for the Milwaukee Brewers.
- Arianne Phillips (Class of 1980), Hollywood costume designer and 3-time Academy Award nominee
- Max Thieriot (Class of 2006), actor
- Morgan Spector (Class of 1998), film and theatre actor

== See also ==
- List of school districts in Sonoma County, California
