= The Fast and the Furious (1954 film) =

American crime drama film by John Ireland

- Lobby card for the film
- Directed by: Edward Sampson; John Ireland
- Screenplay by: Jerome Odlum; Jean Howell
- Story by: Roger Corman
- Produced by: Roger Corman
- Starring: John Ireland; Dorothy Malone; Bruce Carlisle; Iris Adrian; Marshall Bradford
- Cinematography: Floyd Crosby
- Edited by: Edward Sampson
- Music by: Alexander Gerens
- Production company: Palo Alto Productions
- Distributed by: American Releasing Corporation
- Release date: November 1954
- Running time: 73 minutes
- Country: United States
- Language: English
- Budget: $50,000
- Box office: $250,000

Full movie

The Fast and the Furious is a 1954 American crime drama B movie starring John Ireland and Dorothy Malone, co-directed by Ireland and Edward Sampson.

It was the first film produced for the American Releasing Corporation, and the second feature produced by Roger Corman.

== Plot ==
Charged with a murder he did not commit, truck driver Frank Webster has broken out of jail. While on the run toward the Mexico–United States border, and the subject of radio news reports, he is cornered in a small Southern California coffee shop by a zealous citizen who is suspicious of the stranger. Frank manages to escape and, as he gets away, kidnaps a young woman named Connie.

Frank drives off with Connie in her Jaguar XK120 sports car; she is a "lady racer".

Frank enters into a cross-border sports car race under a pseudonym, with plans to escape into Mexico. Faber, one of Connie's friends, is wary of the new stranger driving her car and tries to learn more about Frank.

Connie proves a difficult hostage, trying to escape a few times, which leads Frank to treat her more roughly than they both would prefer. This mutual struggle soon leads the two to fall in love.

To keep Connie from reporting him Frank locks her into a shed and starts the race. Connie starts a fire which is seen by a friend and is rescued. She then reports Frank to the police. Frank crashes through a road block at the border and Faber races after him. On a tight corner Faber goes off the road and crashes into a tree. Frank stops to rescue him, and Connie catches up to them in a car she has borrowed. The movie closes with them embracing as Frank has agreed to turn himself in and face a trial.

== Cast ==
- John Ireland as Frank Webster
- Dorothy Malone as Connie Adair
- Bruce Carlisle as Faber
- Iris Adrian as Wilma Belding
- Marshall Bradford as Mr. Hillman
- Snub Pollard as park caretaker

== Production ==
The film was based on a story by Roger Corman, who had recently moved into producing with Monster from the Ocean Floor (1954) for his company Palo Alto Productions. Corman financed The Fast and the Furious himself with $60,000 he received from Robert Lippert for Monster from the Ocean Floor.

According to Corman, John Ireland only appeared in the film on the condition he could direct it: "John did a fine job directing on a nine-day shoot with a budget of $50,000," said Corman later. Corman also stated that Dorothy Malone "had left her agent and, having no work, accepted a part for next to nothing." Malone later worked for Corman again on Five Guns West (1955).

The film was shot in 10 days in April 1954 under the title Crashout, but a different 1955 film would take that title.

Corman says he "set up a little of the racing car business because I was interested in that, and I did some of the second unit stuff. But I didn't direct as such."

The deal that Corman set up included having the local Jaguar dealer donate his cars as well as having scenes take place at the Monterey race track. Most of the exteriors were shot around Malibu and Point Dume, California. Corman also subbed as a driver in the second of the Jaguar XK120 race cars.

After having to operate as a second unit cinematographer and director, Corman realized he wanted to direct himself: "It was after that film that I decided to become a director."

== Distribution ==
After weighing offers from Columbia, Allied and Republic, Corman made a deal for The Fast and the Furious to be picked up for distribution by a new company, American Releasing Corporation (ARC), formed by Sam Arkoff and James H. Nicholson. Corman said "I realized that the trap for an independent producer was that you made a picture but waited a long time to get your money back. So you couldn't make many films. And what I wanted to do was to get an advance back immediately to make a series of films." Corman says he told ARC "I would give them the film if they would give me all of my money back immediately as an advance against distribution and I would do the same thing on three more films, so I could set myself up as a producer. They were happy to do that because The Fast and the Furious enabled them to start their company. It then meant that I would be able to be a steady supplier of films for them, and they could get their company rolling."

The formation of ARC, which later became American International Pictures (AIP), was announced in October 1954, with The Fast and the Furious as their first release. Corman's Palo Alto company planned to make three more features over the next twelve months, starting with Five Guns West in November.

== Reception ==
=== Critical ===
Variety said "High-priced sportscar bombs furnish most of the action" saying "Racing footage is interesting but becomes repetitious and helps to string out the running time to an unnecessary 73 minutes, an unhandy length for supporting playdates." Film critic Leonard Maltin dismissed the film as labored by "uninspired romantic interludes and cops-on-the-chase sequences." CEA Film called the film "a modest second feature."

=== Box office ===
The film was popular but struggled to recoup money for ARC because it often played on the bottom of double bills, which meant it received a flat fee instead of a percentage. Alex Gordon confirmed that saying "it soon became obvious that single B-pictures like these first three [The Fast and the Furious, Five Guns West, Apache Woman] would not work out for the new company – they played the bottom of twin-bill programming at $25 per booking. AIP would have to own both pictures to obtain percentage bookings." This would prompt AIP to make movies as a package for release as a double bill.

However by August 1955 Corman claimed he had repaid his twelve main investors in the film.

== Legacy ==
The film was successful enough to garner Corman a three movie deal.

In 1994, the film was remade as The Chase, starring Charlie Sheen and Kristy Swanson.

Years later, Neal H. Moritz and Universal Pictures licensed the film's title for 2001's The Fast and the Furious. Moritz said that he had difficulty choosing between proposed titles such as Racer X, Redline, Race Wars, and Street Wars, and was inspired by a documentary on AIP that included Corman's film. Moritz was able to trade the use of some stock footage to Corman for use of the title.

Corman recalled the story differently in a 2022 interview, stating that Moritz had been struggling to name his new film and had turned to his father, a former AIP executive. His father suggested reusing the effective title of the earlier Roger Corman film. Moritz negotiated the rights to use the title from Corman.

== See also ==
- List of American films of 1954
- List of films in the public domain in the United States
