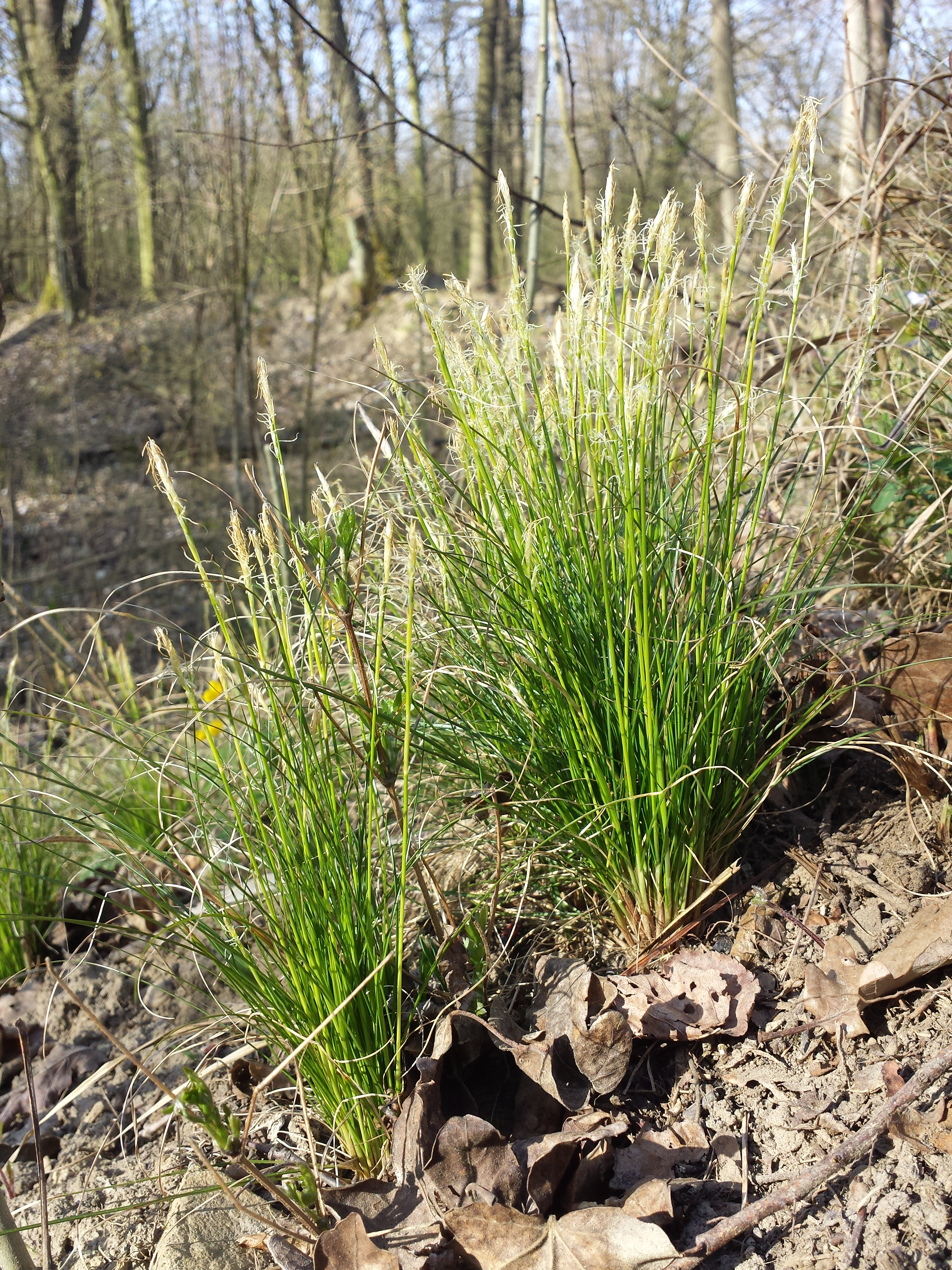
- Habit
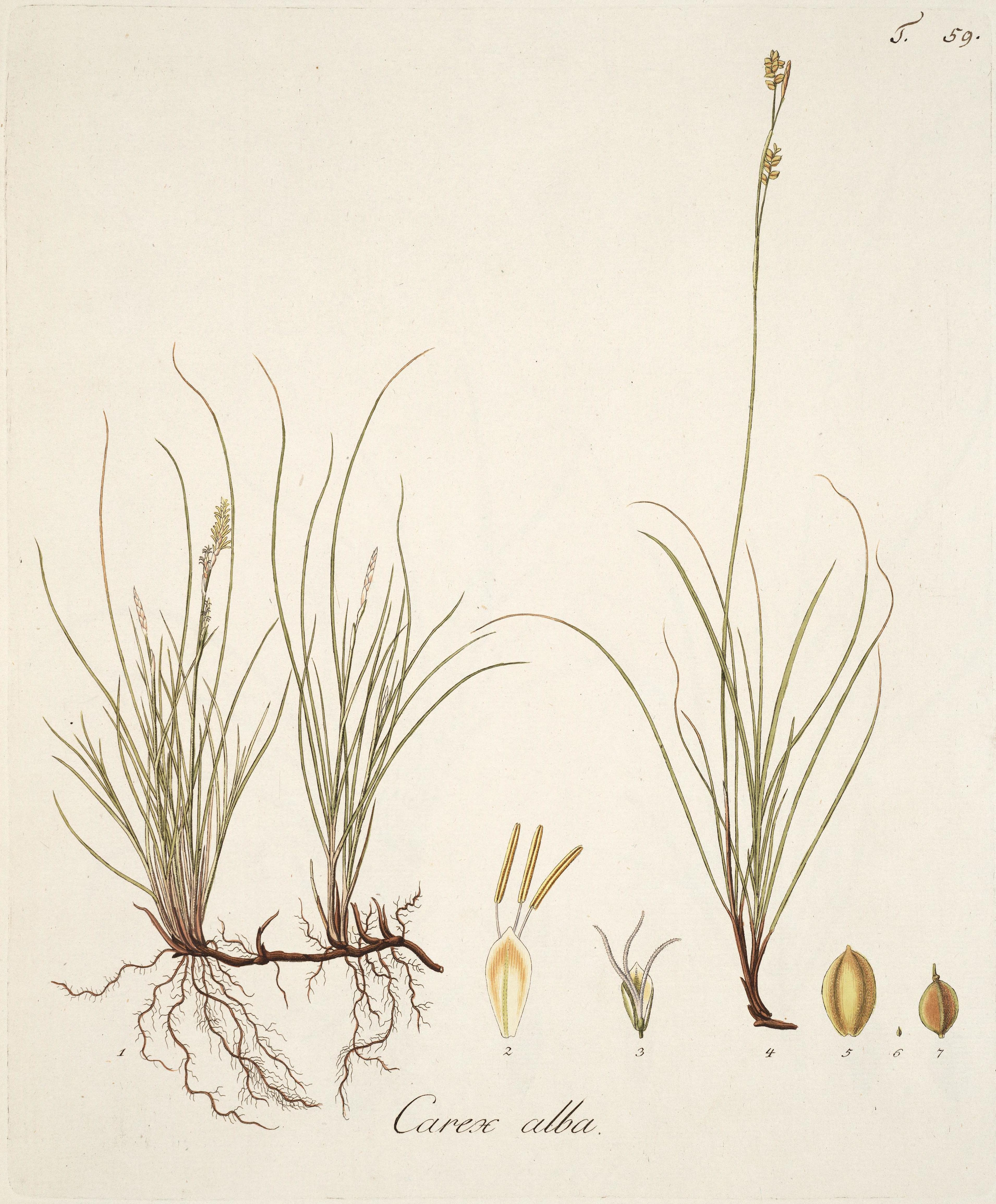
- Botanical illustration

Scientific classification
- Kingdom: Plantae
- Clade: Tracheophytes
- Clade: Angiosperms
- Clade: Monocots
- Clade: Commelinids
- Order: Poales
- Family: Cyperaceae
- Genus: Carex
- Species: C. alba

Binomial name
- Carex alba Scop.

Synonyms
- List: Carex ajanensis Vorosch.; Carex alba f. aprica Kük.; Carex argentea J.F.Gmel.; Carex argentea Vill.; Carex duerrnbergeri Ritzb.; Carex inclusa Turcz. ex Boott; Carex nemorosa Schrank

= Carex alba =

Species of plant in the sedge family

Carex alba, called the small white sedge, white-flowered sedge or just white sedge (a name it shares with other members of its genus), is a species of sedge in the family Cyperaceae. It is typically found in temperate forests of Eurasia, from the Pyrenees to the Russian Far East. It is the main host plant for the woodland brown butterfly, Lopinga achine.

== Description ==
Carex alba is a species of sedge, typically growing in thick clumps between 15–30 cm (5.9–11.8 in) in height. Stems are slender, trigonous, smooth; with sheaths that are leafless at the base. Leaves are shorter than the stem, and flat-bladed. Bracts are greenish-brown and sheathlike. Flowers take the form of terminal spikes, and are white in colour. Nutlets are dark brown, obovate-elliptic, trigonous. Flowers and fruits in June to July.

== Distribution and habitat ==
Carex alba favours dry, wooded areas, temperate pine forests and slopes.
