= Analy High School =

Public secondary school in California, United States

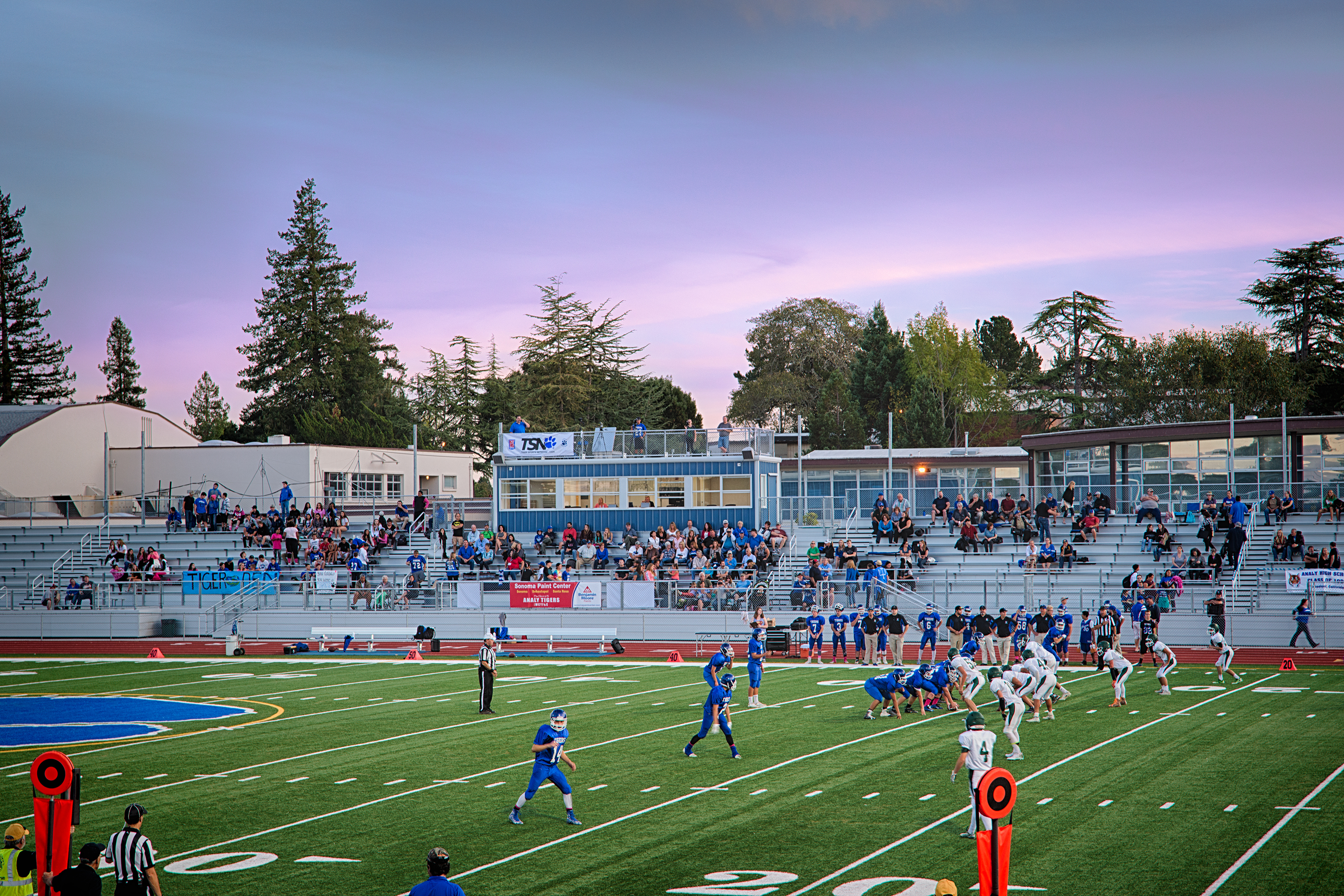

Location
- 38°24′26.1″N 122°49′31.8″W

Information
- Type: Public
- Established: 1908
- Enrollment: 1,166 (2022–2023)
- Colors: Royal blue, white, and red
- Mascot: Tiger

Analy High School is a public high school in Sebastopol, Sonoma County, California. Analy High School is primarily a college preparatory school.

The school is located in what used to be called Analy Township, which derived its name from the Annaly Ranch which was located in the township in the 1840s, which in turn was named for an Annaly in Ireland, which had connections to the settler Jasper O'Farrell.

The school and several facilities, including the library and some classrooms were used as the setting of the Netflix TV show 13 Reasons Why, in which the school is called Liberty High School.

== History ==
The school was established in 1908 in the town of Sebastopol.

Despite the town's small population, the school serves an area of 50,000. The town it serves has changed from a rural community to a more suburban community. Approximately 85% go directly to two or four-year colleges; the school ranks in the 98th percentile on sending students to two or four-year public schools.

In 2021 El Molino High School merged with Analy High and the school was known as "West County High School" for one year, before returning to its original name in 2022.

== Demographics ==
The school served 1,141 students in the 2019–2020 academic year (prior to its consolidation with El Molino High School).

== Athletics ==
The school has over 600 athletes on 38 teams in 21 sports each year, including football, volleyball, cross country, soccer, softball, baseball, swimming, tennis, golf, track and field, wrestling, and badminton.

== Music ==
=== Band ===
There are two band classes and one orchestra class; the total membership exceeds 100 students.

The bands perform in two scheduled concerts per year, as well as perform the national anthem at a San Francisco Giants game, travel to southern California to participate in the Disney Magic Music Days main street parade, and march in the local Apple Blossom Festival Parade.

In 2010, 2011, and 2024 the school orchestra was given a unanimous superior rating at a California Music Educators Association (CMEA) festival at Sonoma State University, the highest rating possible.

=== Choir ===
West County High School choir department performs four concerts (fall, winter, variety, and spring) each year. The choirs are divided into Concert Choir (open enrollment), Chamber Choir (audition only)

== Awards ==
Newsweek ranked the school #184 on their list of the top 500 high schools in the country for 2011, #95 for 2014 (the highest-ranked Californian school north of San Francisco), and #352 for 2016. It has been was named a California Distinguished School four times: in 1986, 1994, 1999, and 2009.

== Notable alumni ==
- Cameron Britton, actor
- Bennett Davison, basketball player
- Cary Fukunaga, director
- Jerry Garcia, founding member of the band The Grateful Dead
- Schuyler Grant, actress (class of 1988), star of films Anne of Green Gables, Anne of Green Gables: The Sequel and Anne of Green Gables: The Continuing Story
- Greyson Gunheim, professional football player with the Oakland Raiders
- Garrett Hill, professional baseball player with the Detroit Tigers
- Yuen Hop, Army Staff Sergeant during World War II, held as a POW and killed in action in Germany. Recipient of the Congressional Gold Medal and a Presidential Unit Citation
- Jean Howell, actress in many film and TV productions
- Willard F. Libby, creator of radiocarbon dating and Nobel laureate
- Matt Nix, creator of popular television shows Burn Notice and The Good Guys
- Mike Nott, professional football player for the Kansas City Chiefs
- Trevor Shimizu (class of 1996), visual artist
- Jim Thornton, professional football player with the Chicago Bears
- Karen Valentine, Emmy Award-winning actress, star of films and television series Room 222
