= Sebastopol, California =

City in California, United States

- City
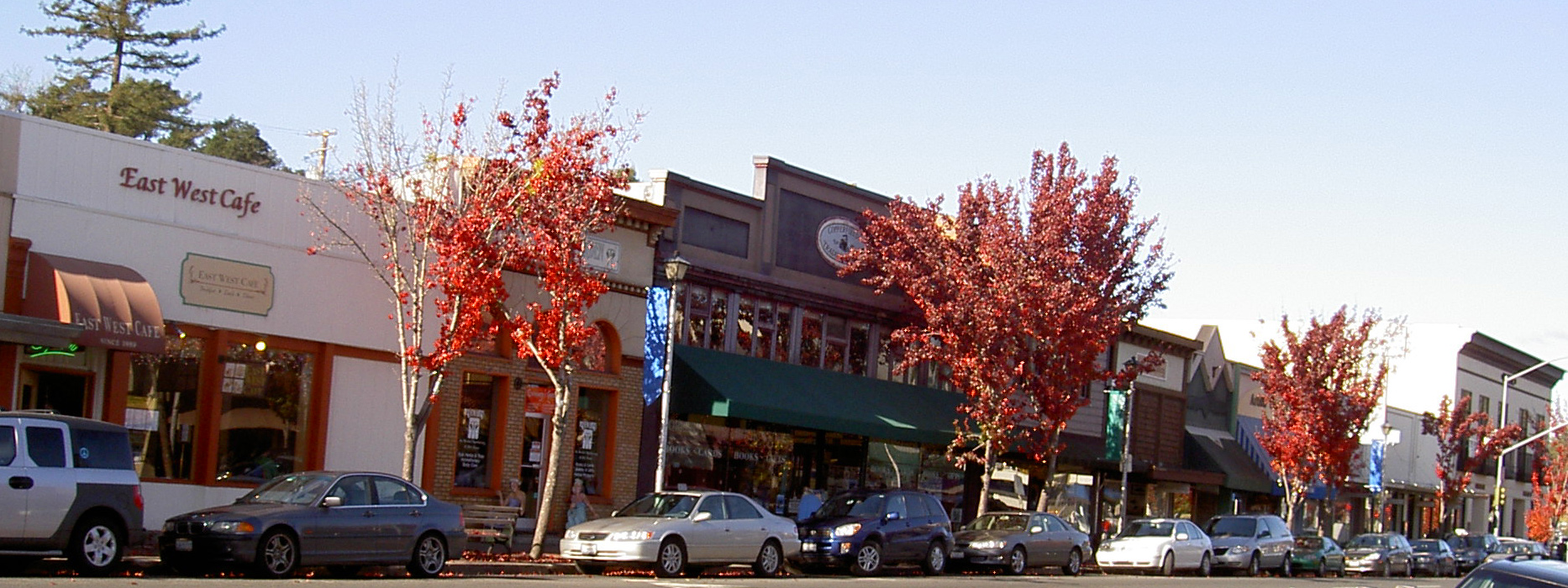
- Main Street in Downtown Sebastopol
- Interactive map of Sebastopol, California
- Location in the United States
- Coordinates: 38°23′57″N 122°49′37″W
- Country: United States
- State: California
- County: Sonoma
- Incorporated: June 13, 1902
- Named for: Siege of Sevastopol

Government
  - Type: Council–manager
  - Mayor: Jill McLewis
  - City manager: Mary Gourley (interim)
  - County supervisor: Lynda Hopkins
  - Assemblymember: Chris Rogers (D)
  - State Senator: Mike McGuire (D)
  - U. S. Rep.: Jared Huffman (D)

Area
  - Total: 1.88 sq mi (4.87 km^{2})
  - Land: 1.88 sq mi (4.87 km^{2})
  - Water: 0 sq mi (0.00 km^{2}) 0%
- Elevation: 82 ft (25 m)

Population (2020)
  - Total: 7,521
  - Estimate (2025): 7,532
  - Density: 4,000/sq mi (1,540/km^{2})
- Time zone: UTC-8 (PST)
  - Summer (DST): UTC-7 (PDT)
- ZIP codes: 95472-95473
- Area code: 707, 369
- FIPS code: 06-70770
- GNIS feature IDs: 277599, 2411857
- Website: www.cityofsebastopol.gov

Sebastopol (/sɪˈbæstəpoʊl, -puːl/ sib-AST-ə-pohl, -pool) is a city in Sonoma County, California, United States with a recorded population of 7,521, per the 2020 U.S. census.

Sebastopol was once primarily a plum- and apple-growing region. The creation of The Barlow, a $32 million mall on a floodplain in Sebastopol, has converted old agricultural warehouses into a marketplace for dining, tasting rooms, and art, and has made Sebastopol a Wine Country destination.

Horticulturist Luther Burbank had gardens in this region. The city hosts an annual Apple Blossom Festival in April, Gravenstein Apple Fair in August, and is home to the Sebastopol Documentary Film Festival.

== History ==
=== Etymology ===
The settlement was originally named Pine Grove. The name change to Sebastopol has historically been attributed to a bar fight in the late 1850s, which was allegedly compared by a bystander to the long Allied siege of the seaport of Sevastopol (1854–1855) during the Crimean War of 1853–1856. The original name survives in the name of the Pine Grove General Store downtown.

=== Indigenous history and early settlers ===
The area's first known inhabitants were the native Coast Miwok and Pomo peoples. The town currently sits atop multiple village sites. The town of Sebastopol formed in the 1850s with a U.S. Post Office and as a small trade center for the farmers of the surrounding agricultural region. As California's population swelled after the westward migration and the California Gold Rush of 1848–1855, settlers drifted into the fertile California valleys north of San Francisco to try their hand at farming. Sebastopol's early settlers included immigrants from a variety of national origins, including a substantial Chinese population that formed a Chinatown in the present-day downtown core beginning in the 1880s.

=== Gravenstein era, incorporation and 1906 earthquake ===
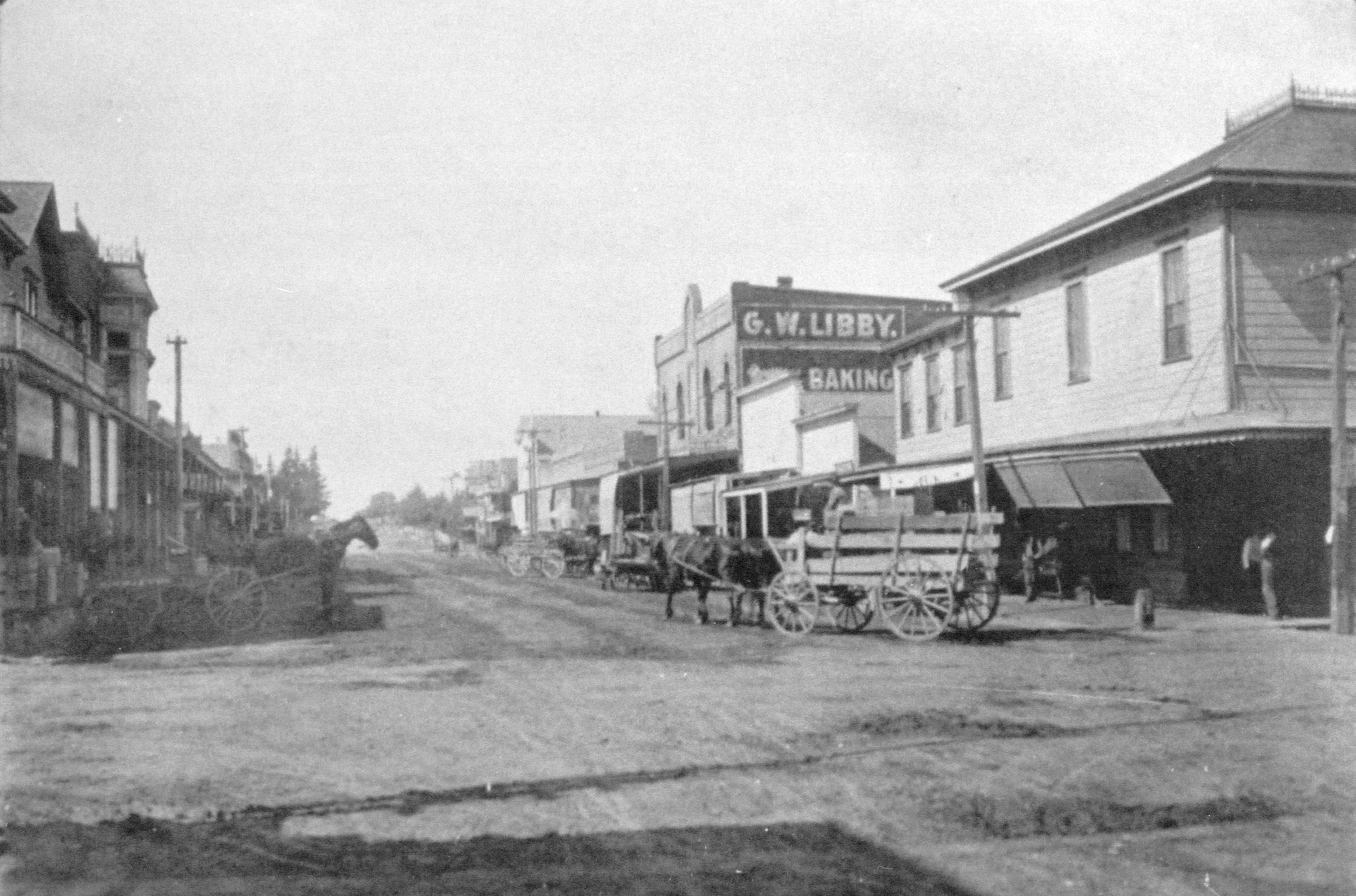
Main Street c. 1898

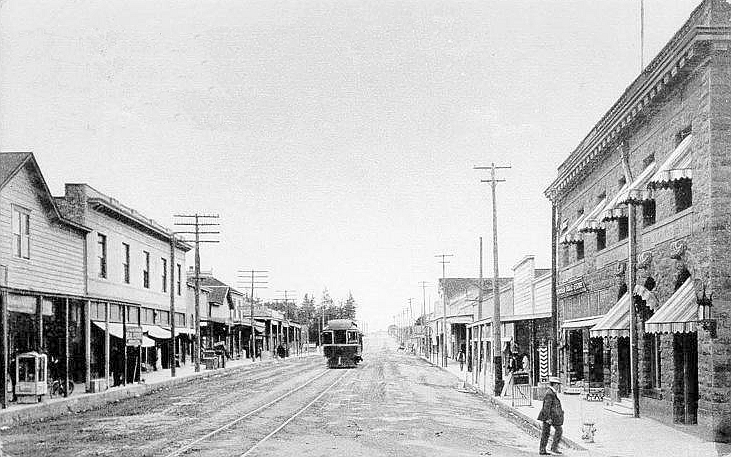
Main Street, 1908

Sebastopol became known as the "Gravenstein Apple Capital of the World." The apple industry brought a steady rural prosperity to the town. In 1890 the San Francisco and North Pacific Railroad connected Sebastopol to the national rail network. The town was incorporated in 1902, with schools, churches, hotels, canneries, mills, wineries, and an opera house to its credit. The 1906 earthquake reduced most of these early buildings to rubble (Sebastopol is only 7 miles or 11 km from the city of Santa Rosa, the worst-hit town in the 1906 earthquake) , but as elsewhere in the county, the town was rebuilt. Contemporary research from the U.S. Geological Survey found that Sebastopol experienced the highest intensity shaking during the earthquake.

The Enmanji Japanese Buddhist Temple was dedicated in 1934. Originally built by the Manchurian Railroad Company and exhibited in the Chicago World's Fair of 1933, the Kamakura-style temple was dismantled and shipped to Sebastopol, where it was reconstructed without the use of nails.

In the second half of the 20th century, the apple industry struggled to compete with other apple-producing regions, and gradually declined in economic significance. With greater personal mobility and the rise of larger shopping centers in other Sonoma County communities, many residents now commute to work and shop in the neighboring towns, and a majority of local vehicle trips end in Santa Rosa.

=== Railways and highways ===
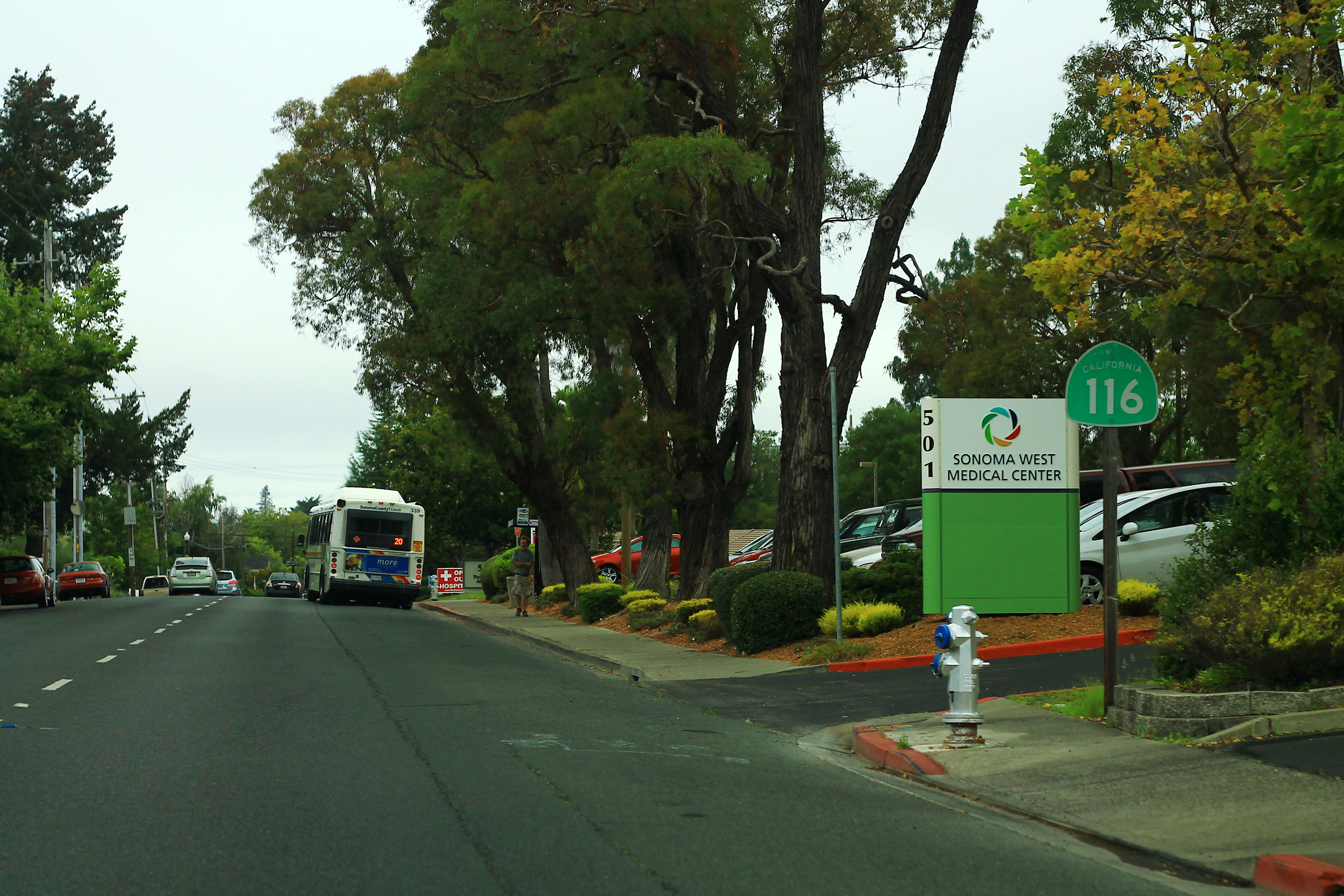
Petaluma Avenue, one-way northbound portion of Highway 116

Sebastopol once had working railroad trains on Main Street, and the tracks were removed in the late 1980s. Passenger service had ceased in the 1930s, and regular freight service ended in the late 1970s. This was documented by Analy High School students in a 1979 video Our Train Down Main: a History of the Petaluma and Santa Rosa Railroad. The canneries and apple-processing plant are gone from downtown, and vineyards and housing developments have replaced many apple orchards, reducing the demand for freight service. The region's last remaining apple processing plant, Manzana Products, announced in 2024 that they would relocate operations to the Yakima Valley of Washington by early 2026.

Around the time of the removal of rail tracks, the Gravenstein Highway (State Route 116) routing through town was redesigned with a pair of one-way streets. Main Street and Petaluma Avenue were designated one-way streets in the 1980s in an attempt to deal with the town's perennial traffic problem.

=== Environmental innovation ===
In 1985, the city passed an ordinance declaring Sebastopol a nuclear-free zone. The town does not use pesticides in city landscaping. Sebastopol became the second city in California (after Lancaster) to require solar panels on all new homes in 2013, a requirement implemented statewide by 2020. The neighboring city of Petaluma passed the first ban in the world on new gas stations in 2021; Sebastopol also imposed a ban along with the North Bay cities of American Canyon, Calistoga, and Rohnert Park.

=== Housing and growth limits ===
Sebastopol adopted an urban growth boundary in its 1994 general plan to restrict urban development outside the boundary. The boundary was formally adopted by a ballot initiative in 1996, and was renewed and extended with additional ballot initiatives as recently as 2016.

After decades of minimal development and stagnating population, the city has responded locally to the larger California housing shortage with affordable housing for low-income residents and people experiencing homelessness. In 2007, the city purchased land on the banks of the Laguna de Santa Rosa to operate Park Village, a city-owned mobile home park for both long-term residents and people exiting homelessness. In partnership with the County of Sonoma and using Project Homekey funds, the former Sebastopol Inn was converted to supportive housing during the COVID-19 pandemic and renamed Elderberry Commons. An 84-unit affordable housing development, including 48 units for farmworkers funded through USDA Rural Development, was approved under a Senate Bill 35 streamlined approval process in 2022.

=== Fiscal crisis ===
In April 2021, $1.2 million was stolen from the city’s reserves account in email-based cyber fraud. The fraud came as the city was already facing a looming budget deficit, estimated at $2.9 million by 2024. Initial actions to curb the fiscal crisis included a 37% water and sewer rate increase in 2024. The rate hike generated controversy, with the mayor indicating that she was “utterly shocked” that the city would charge interest on an internal loan transferring money between the general fund and wastewater fund.

Local residents passed a ½ cent sales tax in the 2024 general election to prevent further deficit spending. The tax would push Sebastopol’s sales tax over the state cap of 10.25% to 10.5% if approved by the California Attorney General, and would become the highest local sales tax in the state outside of Alameda County.

=== Modern agricultural economy ===
Sebastopol is home to national food and beverage producers including Guayakí, Redwood Hill Creamery, Traditional Medicinals, and Bachan’s.

Cideries have grown in Sebastopol in celebration of the Gravenstein apple legacy. Ace Cider was founded in 1993, and Golden State Cider, which started with apples from a Sebastopol orchard, established a tasting room in The Barlow District in 2019.

Sebastopol is in the Russian River Valley AVA, and a variety of wineries and tasting rooms are located in the area. Several local producers and establishments specialize in natural wine, including The Punchdown, an Oakland-originated natural wine bar nominated for a James Beard Award in 2022.

As of 2024, Sebastopol has two restaurants with Bib Gourmand recognition in the annual Michelin Guide: Khom Loi and Ramen Gaijin.

== Geography ==
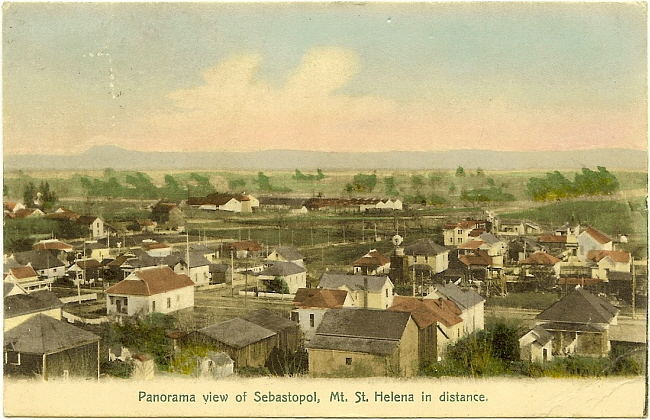
View of Sebastopol c. 1909, with Mt. St. Helena on the horizon

The downtown intersection of State Route 12 and State Route 116 (Gravenstein Highway) is approximately 9 mi (14 km) west of U.S. Route 101.

Sebastopol is situated on the edge of the Laguna de Santa Rosa, which is fed by Santa Rosa Creek and other tributaries, including three minor tributaries within the city limits: Zimpher Creek, Calder Creek and Witter Creek. The Laguna is a wetland area that is home to many species of wildlife and vegetation and divides the town from neighboring Santa Rosa. The Laguna frequently floods during the winter, cutting off State Route 12, and often flooding the low-lying businesses and homes on the eastern side of Sebastopol. The Pitkin Marsh lily and White sedge are two rare species of plants that are found in the vicinity of Sebastopol.

The city has a total area of 1.9 sq mi (4.9 km^{2}), all land.

== Demographics ==
Historical population
Census	Pop.	Note	%±
1880	197		—
1910	1,233		—
1920	1,493		21.1%
1930	1,762		18.0%
1940	1,856		5.3%
1950	2,601		40.1%
1960	2,694		3.6%
1970	3,993		48.2%
1980	5,595		40.1%
1990	7,004		25.2%
2000	7,774		11.0%
2010	7,379		−5.1%
2020	7,521		1.9%
2025 (est.)	7,532	▲	0.1%
U.S. Decennial Census; 1860–1870 1880-1890; 1900 1910 1920; 1930 1940 1950; 1960 1970 1980; 1990 2000 2010; 2020

=== Racial and ethnic composition ===
Race and Ethnicity
Racial and ethnic composition	2000	2010	2020
White (non-Hispanic)	85.35%	81.87%	74.66%
Hispanic or Latino (of any race)	9.26%	11.99%	14.36%
Two or more races (non-Hispanic)	2.32%	2.59%	6.18%
Asian (non-Hispanic)	1.49%	1.57%	2.43%
Other (non-Hispanic)	0.23%	0.19%	0.96%
Black or African American (non-Hispanic)	0.64%	0.92%	0.82%
Native American (non-Hispanic)	0.62%	0.62%	0.40%
Pacific Islander (non-Hispanic)	0.09%	0.24%	0.19%

=== 2020 census ===
As of the 2020 census, Sebastopol had a population of 7,521 and a population density of 3,996.3 inhabitants per square mile (1,543.0/km^{2}). The age distribution was 17.5% under the age of 18, 5.7% aged 18 to 24, 20.7% aged 25 to 44, 27.0% aged 45 to 64, and 29.0% aged 65 or older. The median age was 50.0 years. For every 100 females, there were 81.2 males, and for every 100 females age 18 and over, there were 77.6 males.

The racial makeup of the city was 78.0% White, 0.9% Black or African American, 1.1% American Indian and Alaska Native, 2.5% Asian, 0.2% Native Hawaiian and Other Pacific Islander, 5.7% from other races, and 11.7% from two or more races. Hispanic or Latino residents of any race were 14.4% of the population.

The census reported that 98.5% of residents lived in households, 0.5% lived in non-institutionalized group quarters, and 1.1% were institutionalized. 100.0% of residents lived in urban areas, while 0.0% lived in rural areas.

There were 3,411 households, of which 25.2% had children under the age of 18 living in them. Of all households, 36.7% were married-couple households, 7.5% were cohabiting couple households, 17.4% had a male householder with no spouse or partner present, and 38.4% had a female householder with no spouse or partner present. About 35.0% of households were one person, and 22.1% had someone living alone who was 65 years of age or older. The average household size was 2.17. There were 1,910 families (56.0% of all households).

There were 3,562 housing units at an average density of 1,892.7 units per square mile (730.8 units/km^{2}), of which 3,411 (95.8%) were occupied. Of occupied units, 52.7% were owner-occupied and 47.3% were renter-occupied. Of all housing units, 4.2% were vacant. The homeowner vacancy rate was 0.3%, and the rental vacancy rate was 2.5%.

=== Income and poverty ===
In 2023, the US Census Bureau estimated that the median household income was $99,600, and the per capita income was $52,441. About 3.6% of families and 8.3% of the population were below the poverty line.

=== 2010 census ===
The 2010 United States census reported that Sebastopol had a population of 7,379. The population density was 3,982.4 inhabitants per square mile (1,537.6/km^{2}). The racial makeup of Sebastopol was 6,509 (88.2%) White, 72 (1.0%) African American, 60 (0.8%) Native American, 120 (1.6%) Asian, 19 (0.3%) Pacific Islander, 298 (4.0%) from other races, and 301 (4.1%) from two or more races. Hispanic or Latino of any race were 885 persons (12.0%).

The Census reported that 98.3% of the population lived in households and 1.7% were institutionalized.

There were 3,276 households, out of which 902 (27.5%) had children under the age of 18 living in them, 1,220 (37.2%) were opposite-sex married couples living together, 478 (14.6%) had a female householder with no husband present, 156 (4.8%) had a male householder with no wife present. There were 206 (6.3%) unmarried opposite-sex partnerships, and 52 (1.6%) same-sex married couples or partnerships. 1,132 households (34.6%) were made up of individuals, and 498 (15.2%) had someone living alone who was 65 years of age or older. The average household size was 2.21. There were 1,854 families (56.6% of all households); the average family size was 2.82.

The age distribution was 1,515 people (20.5%) under the age of 18, 471 people (6.4%) aged 18 to 24, 1,587 people (21.5%) aged 25 to 44, 2,525 people (34.2%) aged 45 to 64, and 1,281 people (17.4%) who were 65 years of age or older. The median age was 46.1 years. For every 100 females, there were 79.9 males. For every 100 females age 18 and over, there were 76.7 males.

There were 3,465 housing units, with an average density of 1,870.0 per square mile (722.0/km^{2}), of which 52.9% were owner-occupied and 47.1% were occupied by renters. The homeowner vacancy rate was 0.7%; the rental vacancy rate was 4.2%. 53.7% of the population lived in owner-occupied housing units and 44.5% lived in rental housing units.

The median income for a household in the city was $60,322 (+29.9% from 2000), and the median income for a family was $74,020 (+32.7% from 2000). The median per capita income for the city was $29,470 (+28.8% from 2000). For comparison, statewide California median per capita income in the 2010 Census was $27,885 (+22.8% from 2000).

== Arts and culture ==
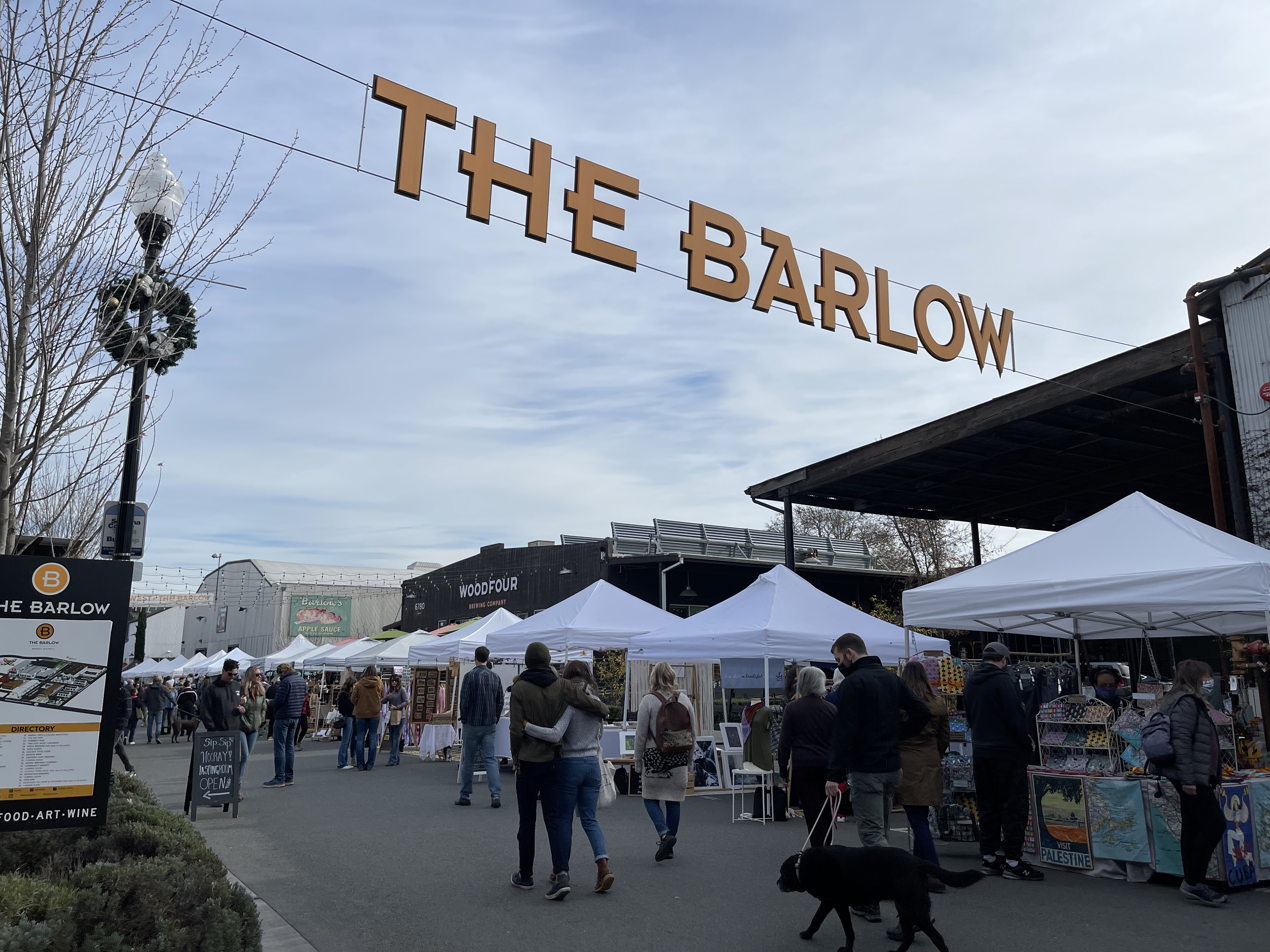
The Barlow marketplace

Places of interest in Sebastopol include:

- Sebastopol Center for the Arts
- Luther Burbank's Gold Ridge Experiment Farm
- Guayaki Sustainable Rainforest Products world headquarters
- The historic Hogan Building: This was the Power House for the Petaluma and Santa Rosa Railroad, an electric railway. The first cars were run on the line in 1904, and the later named Hogan Building, built of stone from a local quarry, is one of the few in the area to withstand the 1906 earthquake.
- West County Museum, operated by the Western Sonoma County Historical Society in the former Petaluma and Santa Rosa Railroad passenger depot
- George A. Strout House
- Ives Park, summer home of the Sonoma County Repertory Theater
- Ragle Ranch Regional Park
- Joe Rodota Trail
- West County Trail
- Laguna de Santa Rosa
- Sebastopol Community Cultural Center
- The Barlow, an outdoor mall on the eastern edge of town, built on the floodplain of the Laguna de Santa Rosa

== Government ==
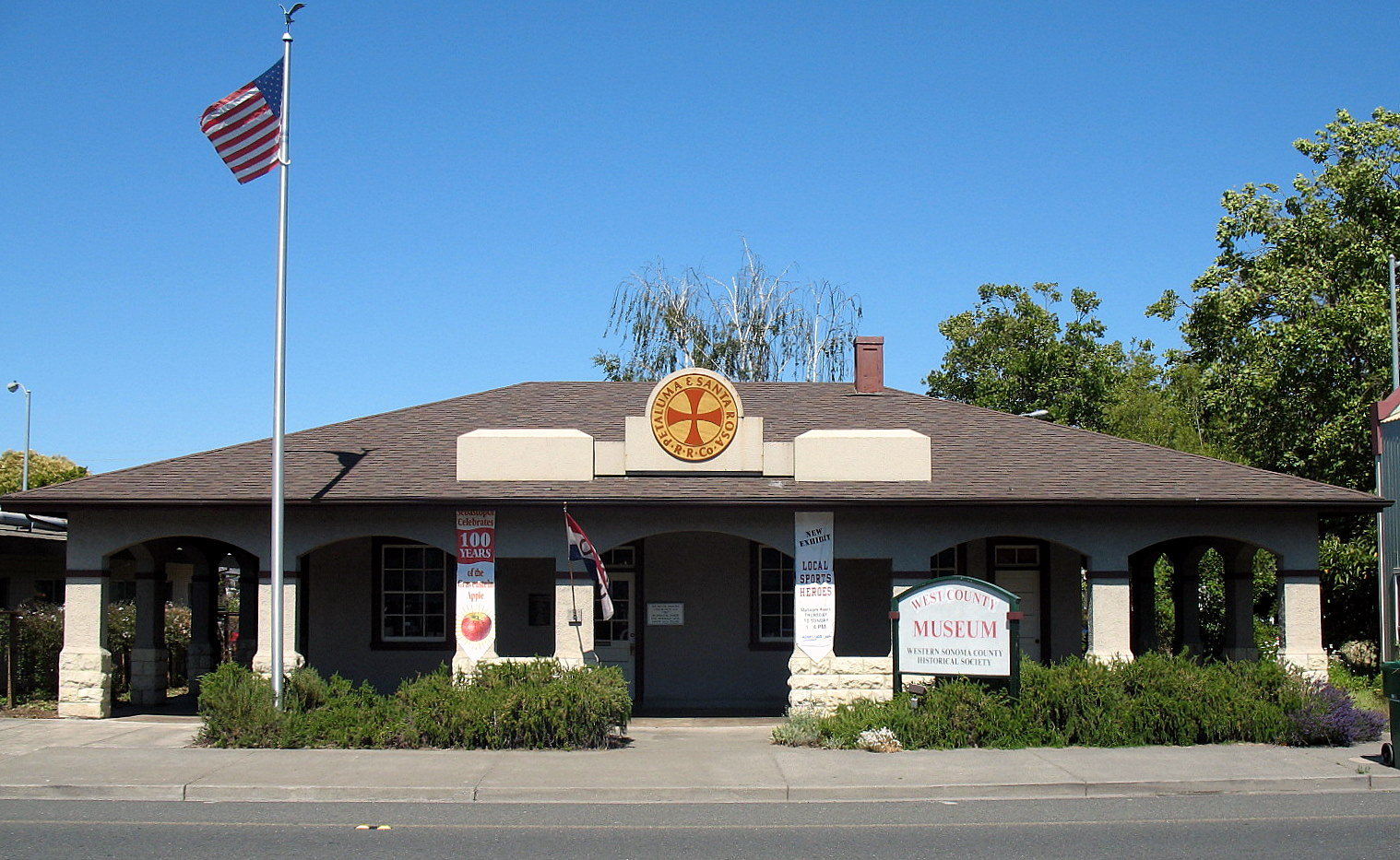
Sebastopol train depot

=== Local ===
The city council consists of five members, each serving four-year terms. The city's laws are enforced by the Sebastopol Police Department. City council races are not partisan, so each member does not officially represent any party; however, since 2000 there has been a decent amount of attention given to the individual party membership of city council members in Sebastopol. This happened because, with the election of Craig Litwin and Sam Spooner to the city council in that year's election, the town had a Green Party majority—or would have, if city council races had been partisan. This was only the second time this had ever happened in California, the first being the town of Arcata in 1996.

The mayor is Jill McLewis.

A former mayor, Robert Jacob, who was selected by the city council in December 2013, was the owner of two medical marijuana dispensaries in Sonoma County. He was reported to be the first American mayor to be involved in the industry.

=== State and federal ===
In the California State Legislature, Sebastopol is in the 2nd Assembly district, represented by Democrat Chris Rogers, and California's 2nd State Senate district, represented by Mike McGuire.

Federally, Sebastopol is in California's 2nd congressional district, represented by Democrat Jared Huffman.

According to the California Secretary of State, as of February 10, 2019, Sebastopol has 5,285 registered voters. Of those, 3,346 (63.3%) are registered Democrats, 518 (9.8%) are registered Republicans, and 1,137 (21.5%) have declined to state a political party.

== Education ==
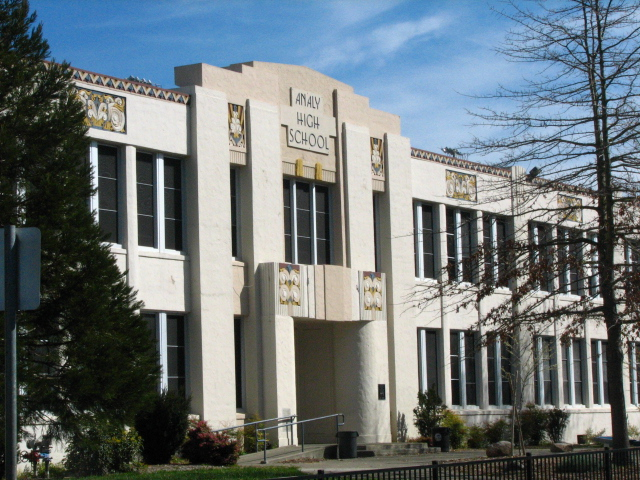
Analy High School

Sebastopol Union Elementary School District and West Sonoma County Union High School District are the local school districts. Both districts cover the entirety of city limits, while the Twin Hills Union School District, Gravenstein Union School District, and Oak Grove Union School District serve the rural outskirts of Sebastopol and feed into the West Sonoma County Union High School District.

Analy High School is the primary high school serving grades 9-12 in the West Sonoma County Union High School District. Following the merger of Analy and El Molino High School in 2021, Analy serves the broader west Sonoma County community. The high school district also operates Laguna High School, a continuation school located on the former El Molino campus in nearby Forestville.

Sebastopol Union operates two schools: Park Side (TK-4) and Brook Haven (5–8).

The Sebastopol Union School District also acts as the sponsor district for the Sebastopol Charter School, a K-8 public Waldorf charter school. The Twin Hills Union School District sponsors the K-8 SunRidge Charter School within the city.

Sebastopol Charter had the highest percentage (58%) of kindergarten students with medical exemptions to vaccines in California as of the summer of 2018.

== Infrastructure ==
=== Law enforcement ===
The Sebastopol Police Department employs 31 sworn and non sworn personnel, and 25 volunteers. The department was founded in the early 1900s.

== Notable people ==
- Luther Burbank, horticulturist who established an 18-acre (73,000 m^{2}) Gold Ridge Environmental Farm in the township in the late 19th century
- Les Claypool, bassist/vocalist of the band Primus
- Peter Coyote, narrator/author/actor
- Peter D'Amato, author
- Jerry Garcia and Mickey Hart of the Grateful Dead
- Nina Gerber, guitarist
- Laeh Glenn, visual artist
- Schuyler Grant, actress of the 1985 adaptation of Anne of Green Gables
- Nick Gravenites, singer/songwriter
- Jean Howell, actress
- Alyssa Jirrels, actress
- Kitaro, Japanese New Age recording artist
- Peter Krause, actor
- J.Lately, rapper
- Luke Lamperti, racing cyclist
- Willard Libby, inventor of carbon dating, went to Analy High School
- Megan McDonald, an American children's literature author of more than 25 books including the Judy Moody and Stink series
- Terence McKenna, ethnobotanist
- John Mitzewich, chef and YouTube host
- Matt Nix, showrunner for Burn Notice
- Valora Noland (born Valor Baum), actress, photographer, and author
- Johnny Otis, rhythm and blues pioneer
- Justin Raimondo, author
- Francine Rivers, novelist
- Mario Savio, freedom activist
- Dave Schools, bassist of the band Widespread Panic
- Charles M. Schulz, cartoonist and creator of Peanuts
- Smoov-E, rapper
- Mary Lou Spiess, polio survivor, disability rights advocate and pioneer of disabled fashion
- Rider Strong, actor
- Karen Valentine, actress of the television show Room 222
- Obie Scott Wade, screenwriter and creator of SheZow, went to Analy High School
- Tom Waits, singer/songwriter/musician
- Guy Wilson, actor
- Kate Wolf, singer/songwriter

== Sister cities ==
- Chyhyryn, Ukraine
- Takeo, Japan

== See also ==
- Film locations in Sonoma County, California
