= Testimony in the trial of Patrick Eugene Prendergast =

Testimony played a significant role in presentations by both the prosecution and defense during trial of Patrick Eugene Prendergast in 1893, on murder charges for killing (assassinating) Chicago Mayor Carter Harrison III. The assassination and trial was a prominent affair, being heavily covered by news media. Some contemporary journal literature related to the trial has called into question the relevant expertise of medical professionals that had testified in the trial as expert witnesses.

Prendergast's action of having killing Harrison was not contested in the trial. Instead, the defense argued an insanity plea. Since outcome of the case rested on determining whether Prendergast was sane (guilty) or insane (not guilty by reason of insanity), the cases presented by both the defense and prosecution relied heavily on testimony. Expert witnesses testified on their professional opinions about Prendergast's sanity. Lay witnesses' testified about Prendergast's history, personality, and behavior.

The trial resulted in a guilty verdict, and Prendergast was sentenced to death by hanging.

== Importance and qualifications of expert witnesses ==
Expert testimony (by the era's understanding of expertise) made up a very large portion of the testimony heard in the trial.

At the time, expert witnesses for matters of sanity tended to be medical doctors regardless of whether they held any specialty granting them understanding of behavior. The specialized fields of psychiatry and psychology had not yet been properly established. Additionally, nonprofessionals were held by courts as permissible expert witnesses. This meant that a mere "common sense" view of sanity could be admitted as expert opinion. Resultantly, when the prosecution brought a medical doctor to testify that Prendergast's display of fear while jailed was an indication of sanity, the medical doctor was not an alienist (psychiatrist). During the trial, several medical doctors testified on behalf of the prosecution to assert that, while Prendergast was paranoid, he still knew right from wrong and that he was capable of standing trial for the murder.

In a journal article published in The American Law Register and Review in 1894, H. M. Bannister cast doubt on the psychiatric knowledge of several of the prosecution's expert witnesses (including Dr. Bluthardt).

An editorial in the February 1894 edition of The Journal of the American Medical Association called into question the ethics involved with much of the expert testimony given in the trial, suggesting,

[Much] bias [by expert witnesses] towards one of the other side frequently arises from their being employed practically as assistant counsel, to coach the attorneys. In our judgement, a witness should be ineligible to give evidence as an expert, who has acted as an advisor to counsel in the case at issue.

An editorial in the July 1894 edition of The Journal of the American Medical Association (which expressed agreement with the outcome of the trial) called into question the expertise of many of the expert witnesses both the prosecution and defense had called to the stand.

In a July 1895 journal article published in Medical Record, physician J. R. Ransom opined that, "the case was clearly one for medical testimony to decide on. Ransom believed that the physicians that case opted against calling (due to their determination that he was insane) had more relevant credentials towards determining sanity than the medical doctor the state called to testify to the opinion that Prendergast was sane. Ransom characterized the latter as, "a surgeon with considerable local reputation making no claim, however, to expert knowledge of insanity."

A 2002 journal article by Edward M. Burke that was published in the Journal of Criminal Law & Criminology notes that the prosecution's expert witnesses ignored key aspects of Prendergast's biography that had been outlined by lay witnesses for the defense,

"Expert" witnesses testified that although [Prendergast] was a "crank," he was, in fact, sane when he pulled the trigger and murdered Harrison. They paid little attention to the report that he had suffered a severe head trauma as a child that left him impaired, or the fact that his grandfather had died in Ireland in a lunatic asylum.

== Testimony during the prosecution's presentation ==
After Wade finished the defense's opening statement, the prosecution's arguments began.

In the two days which followed the end of opening remarks, a parade of witnesses for the prosecution were questioned before the court to establish facts. The prosecution relied primarily on laypeople as witnesses, rather than expert witnesses. Thirty non-medical witnesses were called, many of them being individuals casual connections of Prendergast who they brought to illustrate that Prendergast was sane. This included the judge that had presided over the arraignment, despite the fact that Prendergast had only appeared before that judge for less than ten minutes.

=== December 13 ===
The prosecution's first witnesses included several house staff of Harrison's. The first witness to testify was parlor maid Mary Hansen, who had let Pendergast into the residence on the evening of the murder. Her testimony was followed by the testimonies of Helma Johnson (Harrison's other housemaid), Harrison's cook, and Bartha Reisberg (Harrison's coachman). Also testifying about the circumstances of the night of the assassination was Harrison's son William Preston Harrison.

=== December 14: close of the prosecution's presentation ===
News reporter Edward P. Stone testified that he had interviewed Prendergast at the Chicago Police Department's Central Station on the night the murder occurred and that Prendergast had divulged details of the murder, including that his motivation for murdering Harrison was both Harrison's failure to appoint him as corporation counsel, as well as his own deeply-held concerns about the need for the city to grade-separate the city's railroad tracks through elevation. Desk sergeant O. Z. Barbour testified about Prendergast's surrender at the Des Plains Street police station and the confession he delivered there.

Harrison's daughter Sophie Harrison was called to testify. She was noted to have been highly emotionally overwhelmed while providing testimony about her father's murder. Her emotional state led to the prosecution deciding to cut short their questioning of her. Consequentially, prosecutors opted to keep her testimony short, only asking her questions that established a handful of important facts about the killing. The defense declined to cross examine her. Her testimony was followed by that of Frank A. McDonald, another desk sergeant of the Des Plains police station. McDonald testified that he had overheard Prendergast tell John S. Walsh (an operator at the station) that he had shot Harrison because believed that Harrison had betrayed his confidence. Walsh testified next, and corroborated McDonald's account.

Next to testify was Harrison's neighbor W. J. Chalmers, who recounted the mayor's death. Several other neighbors of Prendergast also testified about witnessing aspects of that night (including some testimony of witness accounts Prendergast entering the residence, sounds of gunshots, and the sight of Prendergast fleeing). Benjamin Price, a deputy jailer that had supervised Prendergast's detention, testified that in the morning after the murder Prendergast had personally asked him for the morning's newspaper because he wanted to read the news coverage of the assassination. Detective S. D. McCarthy testified that he had attempted to get Prendergast to divulge where he had purchased the murder weapon, but that Prendergast would only share that he had purchased it from a second-hand shoe salesman who operated on Milwaukee Avenue.

An adjournment took place until 2pm local time, due to the inability of the prosecutor's only remaining witnesses to be available to testify until then. When the court reconvened at 2pm for its afternoon session, the prosecutor's called the final witness' of their presentation: Dr. Louis G. Mitchell and Dr. Ludvig Hektoen, the two doctors that had conducted Harrison's autopsy. Mitchell testified about his findings. Dr. Hektoen's testimony corroborated Mitchell's. The three bullets that had been extracted from Harrison's corpse were produced. The final action in the prosecution's presentation was entering the bullets into evidence. On December 14 at 2:25pm local time, the prosecution rested.

== Testimony during the defense's presentation ==
=== December 14: start of the defense's presentation ===
==== Testimony of Ellen (mother of the defendant) ====
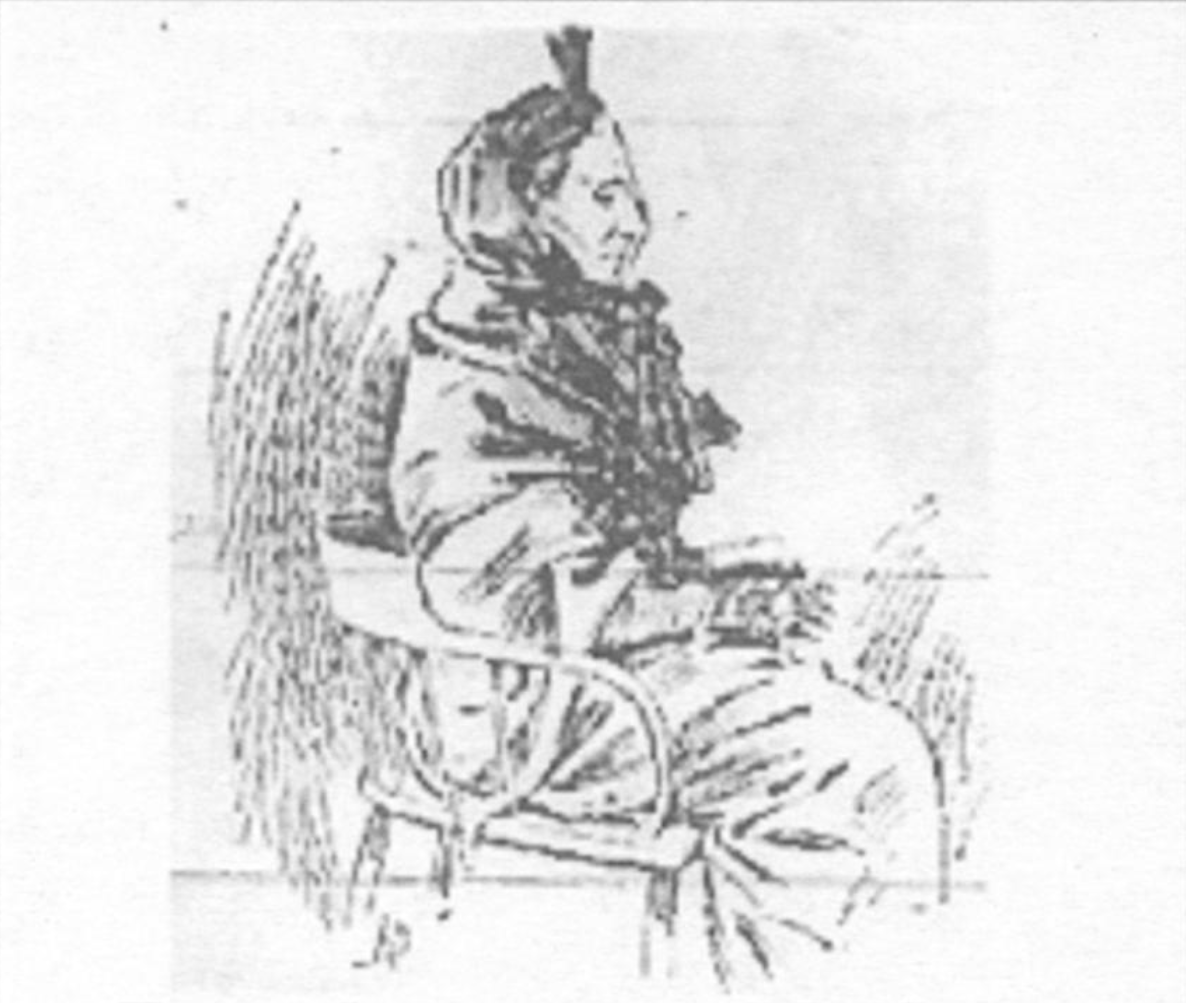
Illustration of Prendergast's mother

The defense's presentation began on December 14 after the prosecution rested their's. The first witness they called was Prendergast's mother, Ellen Prendergast. They regarded her to be their strongest and most important witness. The purpose of her testimony was to provide evidence that Prendergast was insane. She also established general biographic information about his life, his education, and his employment history. She testified that Prendergast had been a reserved and studious child, but had suffered from a poor memory. Mrs. Prendergast testified that, as a child, Prendergast had also experienced a personality change following his father's death.

She testified that at the age of 16, Prendergast had left home without cause for four weeks, and that not too long after he left school amid his father's poor health to take a job as a courier for Western Union. However, not too long later he had believed himself to be entering a decline in health, and traveled to New Mexico for twelve weeks, upon returning from which he had the appearance of a tramp. She testified that had the age of seventeen, he became more antisocial, and began to demand that he sleep in private rather than share a sleeping quarters with his brother. She also testified that it was around this time had he developed his obsessive fascination with the writings of Henry George. She also testified to his increasing obsession with Henry George's economic philosophies and with religion.

Mrs. Prendergast testified further than roughly a year prior to the trial, she had believed her son was becoming crazy in his obsession with city politics and the matter of elevating railroad tracks above grade. She testified that it was around this time that began expressing his delusional confidence that he would receive an appointment as corporation counsel, and that when she had attempted to reason with him on the matter he became angry and ranted at her before disappearing from her life for the following three months. She testified that he, at some point then, traveled to Wisconsin, only returning in July 1893. She testified that two weeks prior to the assassination, he visited her and asked for her to return to his possession his dumbbells because he wanted to exercise and gain strength in order to provide for his personal defense. She testified that this exchange ended with a tirade in which he mentioned his concern of what he believed to be severe problems in the Catholic Church and told her he had written instructions to all of the priests and to the Archbishop on how to fix. She testified that was the last he had heard from him prior to the assassination.

In cross examination, Trude had Mrs. Prendergast confirm that she had initially commented shortly following the assassination that her son was sane. He also had her confirm that she had never before shared beliefs of her son's insanity prior to the assassination. She admitted that she did not notice that her son had any symptoms of insanity and that nobody had previously told her than they considered his behavior peculiar, with the exception of his more recent obsession with George's single tax theory. Also during the cross-examination, by seeming accident, brought up that Prendergast had been seriously injured as a baby after hitting his head after a fall from a height of four feet, and that this incident had left lasting damage to his eyesight. Trude questioned her further on this, amid which Prendergast lost his temper and shouted, "Trude, you are a scoundrel to talk to my mother that way." A reporter for the Chicago Tribune opined that during the proceedings on December 14, Prendergast had, "exhibited the greatest insolence towards everyone around him, and made running comments on all that occurred."

==== Testimony of Brother Baldwin (former superintendent of St. Patrick's Academy) ====
The second and last witness for the defense on the initial day of its presentation was Brother Baldwin, who had previously been the supervisor at St. Patrick's Academy. He testified that while he had known very little of Prendergast's time as a student at the academy, he had become better acquainted with Prendergast three years before the trial when Prendergast began to contact and visit him, bothering him with talk about religion and single tax. He testified that he had believed Prendergast to be insane, an opinion he had shared with other priests at the time. However, he was unable to point to any specific aspects of that conversations Prendergast had had with him that were an explicit indication of his being insane rather than merely annoying. He also testified that he had refused Prendergast continued admittance to the academy due to his belief that Prendergast was crazy.

=== December 15 ===
==== Testimony Brother Adjutor (former principal of St. Patrick's Academy) ====
On the second day of the defense's presentation, many witnesses testified. The first to testify was Brother Adjutor, who had been the principal of St. Patrick's Academy while Prendergast was a student there. Adjutor testified that his sole recollection about Prendergast as a student was that he was so anti-social at lunchtime that Adjutor had suspected him to be mentally ill. He further testified that five years prior to the rial, Prendergast had visited him and sent him letters which gave him full confidence in opining that Prendergast was insane. He remembered very few details from the letters, but was able to recall that one included a prayer which Prendergast claimed held the power make a person invincible. He also testified that he had once had Brother Ambrose (another teacher at the Academy) join him to hear a conversation with Prendergast, and that Ambrose concurred with him that Prendergast appeared insane and in need of involuntary commitment. Brother Ambrose testified before that court to corroborate this, and also acted out an impression the self-important and pompous manner of speaking that Prendergast regularly used. He also testified that he had once received a post card from Prendergast with an incoherent screed written upon it, recalling that it had further given him the impression that Prendergast was insane.

==== Testimony of recent acquaintances of Prendergast: Ellen McCormick, Walter Cooley, Philip Cahill, James Clancy, Rev. A. J. Clare, John Johnson ====
Ellen McCormick, the organist at St. Columbkill's Catholic Church testified that, in knowing Prendergast over the previous year-and-a-half, she was certain of his insanity. One reason that she cited was his persistence in annoying her by trying to pull her into unwanted conversations about subjects such as the ideology of Henry George, often speaking at inappropriate moments such as mid-mass. She also cited two incoherent letters he had written her, though testified that she would be unable to produce those letters as evidence.

Walter Cooley, a lawyer that was a member of the Single Tax club to which Prendergast also belonged, testified that he believed Prendergast was insane. He cited an incoherent an inappropriate speech that Prendergast had delivered top the club two years prior. He also testified that Prendergast had attempted to get Cooley to aid him in his quest to be appointed Corporation Council, having approached him in a waiting room at the mayor's City Hall office shortly after Harrison's election and presented him with the reasons he should hold the post. He also produced for the court a postal court dated May 2, 1893 with largely-incoherent writing by Prendergast, as well as promise by Prendergast that once he was appointed corporation counsel he'd appoint Cooley to be his assistant.

Philip Cahill, janitor of St. Columbkill's Catholic Church, testified that he believed Prendergast was insane, citing unusual behavior at the church. Gus Engle, a lithographic printer who had known Prendergast for nine years, testified that the only thing unusual he had ever noticed about Prendergast was that he constantly sought to be alone, and spent all of his free time reading books. James Clancy, who had known Prendergast for four years (having met at a young men's organization at St. Columbkill's Catholic Church) testified that he was certain that Prendergast was insane. Clancy recalled Prendergast as being reserved and not speaking unless other spoke to him, however this characterization was contrasted by Prendergast immediately afterwards interrupting Clancy's testimony, both speaking and physically jumping. Clancy continued his testimony, but Prendergast made further interruptions (including ranting about subjects such as Henry George) and was ultimately removed from the courtroom.

Reverend A. J. Clare, an acquaintance of Prendergast, testified to his belief that Prendergast was insane. He had met Prendergast through the Single Tax Club, of which both were members in February 1891. He described Prendergast as constantly talking out of order during meetings, and constantly having to be corrected for it. He testified that, in November 1892, he received from Prendergast a copy of the same prayer that Brother Adjutor had mentioned in his testimony, and that Prendergast claimed to him that the prayer had been revealed by the Virgin Mary to a saint and had thereafter been discovered inside a cave in the third century. Clare testified that Prendergast expressed the belief that repetition of the prayer would grant absolute immunity from being harmed by fire, flood, or combat. He further testified that he was additionally convinced of Prendergast's insanity due to Prendergast writing diagonally rather than horizontally in a December 1892 Christmas card that he sent to Clare.

John Johnson (the city circulator of the Inter Ocean newspaper) testified about his experience having worked with Prendergast for many years. He testified that Prendergast first began working for him in the early 1880s, leaving for sometime in the 1880s. He testified he became professionally re-acquainted with Prendergast when Prendergast began buying papers from sometime around July 1889 to sell on a private route. Re testified that this remained their relationship until July 12, 1892, when Prendergast again began working directly for him as a North Side paper carrier. He further testified that on July 11, 1893, Prendergast disappeared for ten or twelve days, after which he returned to request a route in the business district. Johnson testified that he had granted Prendergast this request, and that Prendergast worked such a route from August 6 until the day he killed Harrison. He testified that in the course of this professional acquaintance, he had not seen Prendergast presenting any signs of derangement.

==== Testimony of Corporation Counsel Adolph Kraus ====
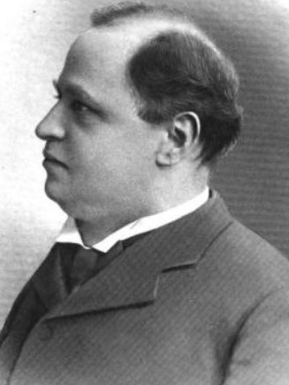
Adolph Kraus (Corporation Counsel of Chicago) testified on both December 14 and December 21

Corporation Counsel Adolph Kraus testified for the defense. In his testimony, Kraus stated that four weeks prior to the assassination Prendergast had come to his office to tell him he should resign the office so that Prendergast could assume it and find a way of compelling the elevation of railroad tracks (in order to eliminate grade crossings). Kraus testified to having toyed with Prendergast for his amusement, introducing him to various employees around the Corporation Counsel's office. Testimony corroborating Kraus's account was provided by several employees (Note: corroborating witnesses were Byron Bailey (chief clerk of the Corporation Counsel's office) as well as Maxwell Dickson and T. M. Friedlander (attachés of the same office)) of the office.

==== Testimony of George Schilling ====
George Schilling (Secretary of the Illinois State Board of Statistics) testified about two instances in which he had met Prendergast, and in which Prendergast had threatened to harm him if he continued voicing opinions that Prendergast found disagreeable.

Schilling first testified about meeting Prendergast during a meeting of the American Secular Union a year prior. The meeting featured a denunciation of religion and of churches. After the meeting, Prendergast approached Schilling and threatened him, "if you talk that way, we christians will have to kill you," and quoted scripture which he believed would justify such a killing. Schilling attested that Prendergast seemed so sincere in his threat that it had caused him to shudder.

Schilling next testified about a second encounter with Prendergast during a public discussion at Hull House. Schilling recounted that after voicing minor disagreement with views of Henry George, he was again threatened by Prendergast and warned to be cautious about voicing any criticism of George.

==== Testimony of Single Tax Club acquaintances of Prendergast: Henry McFarlane, John Z. White, H.G. Barthalomew ====
Several witnesses that were members of the Single Tax Club which Prendergast had attended testified about Prendergast's conduct at meetings. Henry McFarlane testified that from his encounters with Prendergast at the Single Tax Club, he was given the impression at Prendergast was a hazardous lunatic and that the police should likely be warned of the danger he posed. He recounted that Prendergast was always insistent on speaking, and always appeared both nervous and restless. He opined that Prendergast always appeared to be under some sort of great nervous strain, often stuttering and finding it difficult to voice any cogent thoughts. He also recounted that Prendergast's eyes frequently wandered. He further recounted that Prendergast had told him that it was his opinion that the only means to root out municipal [government] corruption was Christian faith.

John Z. White testified that Prendergast had been a regular participant in discussions during club meetings, often wandering off-topic and into religious diatribes. He recounted one that at one meeting, one of Prendergast's tangents had motivated himself and another member (Edward Moore) together to grab Prendergast by his collar and physically expel him from the meeting room. He recounted that on another occasion, it appeared that Prendergast had contemplated jumping out of a window and come very close to doing so before White physically restrained him.

H.G. Bartholomew's testimony was cut short, as he testified that he had and would never expressed an opinion on another person's sanity without clear evidence, and therefore would not express an opinion on Prendergast's. Another member of the club, Robert Cummings, testified next and was willing to express absolute confidence that Prendergast was insane. However, he conceded that he had not warned others of Prendergast's insanity prior to the assassination.

==== Testimony of Joseph W. McCarthy (neighbor of Prendergast) ====
Joseph W. McCarthy, a milkman who lived as a neighbor of the Prendergast house on Jane Street, testified to interactions with Prendergast that caused him to believe he was insane. He first recounted that on August 27 he had seen Prendergast at Humboldt Park behaving very unusually. He recounted that Prendergast was walking with his head facing towards the grown and his hands placed over his head, walking through a tree-dotted landscape and numerous times bumping into trees. McCarthy testified that after seeing this, he spoke to John Prendergast, offering him with his belief that his brother was insane.

McCarthy also recounted an occasion where Prendergast was given a ride by McCarthy in his milk wagon. He testified that for the entire duration of a ride between Sangamon Street and the Halsted Street Bridge, Prendergast anti-socially did not exchange any words with McCarthy.

=== December 16 ===
==== Testimony of Ellen Prendergast (mother of defendant, recalled witness) ====
December 16 (the third day of the defense's presentation) began with Prendergast's mother being recalled as a witness to provide further testimony. Her additional testimony pertained to hereditary insanity within the Prendergast family. She testified that her son, the defendant, had a paternal grandfather (William Prendergast) who had suffered periodical bouts of insanity and had been confined to an insane asylum in Ballyclogh, County Cork, Ireland.

==== Testimony of William Cook ====
William Cook, the secretary of a YMCA branch on Chicago's Kinzie Street, testified to his recollections and impressions from having known Prendergast for eighteen months, as well as his interaction with Prendergast on the day of the assassination. Cook recounted an instance in which believed Prendergast had concocted an elaborate lie seemingly to cushion his own ego he had been corrected by Cook after offering Cook a poor interpretation of biblical scripture. Cook recalled that two months after he had corrected Prendergast about his misunderstandings of scripture, Prendergast returned to him claiming to have received a letter from Pope Leo XIII endorsing the understanding earlier offered by Prendergast as correct. Prendergast later brought Cook a letter which he claimed featured relations delivered to a monk. Cook testified that he strongly suspected that both purported letters were hoaxes by Prendergast.

Cook recounted that on the day of the assassination, Prendergast sat in Cook's office between 9 am and 1:30 pm local time. He recalled that for these entire hours, Prendergast had sat staring out of the office's window, and that the only instance in which Prendergast exchanged any words in those hours to ask what time it was.

==== Testimony of John Lunt, Charles Imlion, Peter Gerrie, and Edward O. Brown ====
John Lunt, a mail carrier acquainted with Prendergast through the literary society at St. Columbkills Catholic Church, testified that Prendergast had exhibited eccentric behavior at meetings of the literary society. He recounted Prendergast disrupting the remarks of an essayist at one meeting one meeting and launching into a confused tyrade about Henry George, corruption on the Chicago City Council, and the papal infallibility.

Charles Imlion testified that he had once roomed with Prendergast for five nights, during two of which Prendergast rose up in the middle of the night marching around his room and an adjoining room with a lamp held over his head rambling to himself. Another former boarding mate Peter Gerrie (employed as an expressman) testified that Prendergast's route while pacing and rambling in the middle of the night had also included the residence's kitchen.

Edward O. Brown, an attorney, testified that Prendergast had approached him to ask for a monetary loan. He recounted that, at the time he approached Brown, Prendergast was carrying papers for his paper route under his arms, and had expressed to Brown that he was embarrassed to be seen by him while carrying papers for his paper route. He also recalled that, in the same interaction, Prendergast expressed worry about the prospect of winding up in a poorhouse.

==== Testimony of John Prendergast (brother of defendant) ====
John Prendergast, the brother of the defendant, provided testimony about his brother's mental condition and behavior . He testified that Prendergast (the defendant) had carried himself dimly until the age of sixteen, at which age he suddenly began exhibiting intelligence, independence, and egotism. He recalled that, after Prendergast (the defendant) turned twenty, he disappeared, becoming a vagrant for some time. He recalled Prendergast (the defendant) showing up on his door step at 3 in the morning in July looking poorly kept, and when asked where he had disappeared to, he answered that he had wound up in Wisconsin without recollection of how he got there, (Note: In his 1937 memoir, Dr. Francis W. McNamara (the former chief physician of the Cook County Jail) opined that this episode may have been a case of Prendergast suffering a dissociative fugue, though he conceded that there is not clear enough evidence to determine this) but with the knowledge that he had traveled there on a mission for the good of mankind. The he also testified that prior to his brother (the defendant) returning, he had spoken with attorney Walter Cooley about his belief that his brother (the defendant) was insane, and that he had again concerned worried and unsure about the whereabouts of his brother (the defendant) during a period leading up to the slaying of Mayor Harrison.

His testimony was followed by the final witness of the day, Amelia Warnish; who testified that Prendergast had once boarded at his house, but left unannounced without paying debts to her, and had stolen a bed quilt when he departed.

=== December 18: expert testimony by physicians ===
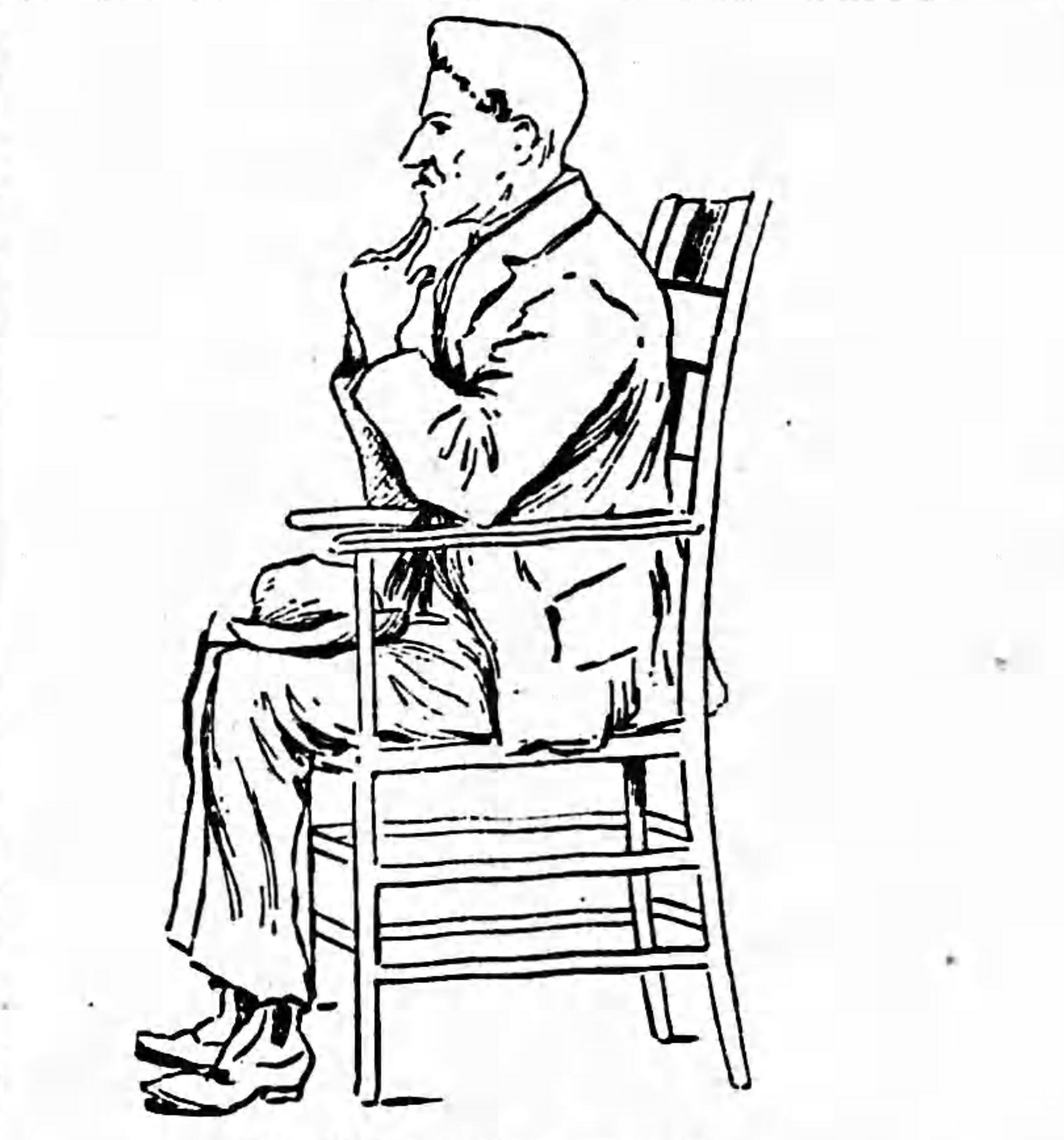
Illustration of Prendergast in the courtroom

==== E. S. Talbot (phrenologist) ====
On December 18, the first witness called by the defense was Dr. E. S. Talbot testified that he had discovered a new phrenology-based method to detect insanity. He displayed a plaster cast he had made of Prendergast's jaw, and shared measurements he had taken of Prendergast's head. It was his view that arrested development in the anterior portion of Prendergast's scull (particularly his nasal bones) indicated that Prendergast was afflicted with neurotic degeneration and insanity.

==== Testimony by physicians that had observed Prendergast at the state's behest: Dr. Archibald Church, Dr. D. R. Brower, Dr. John H. Slayer, Dr. F. Kiernan ====
The prosecution had hired a group of physicians to observe Prendergast's conduct during the trial to assess his mental state. However, most of these physicians ultimately did not to share their opinions. Of the six, only one was willing to testify that Prendergast was sane, and thus that was the only of these physicians which the prosecution had brought as a witness. Four of the medical doctors that the prosecution had hired but decided not to call as witnesses were subpoenaed by the defense, but only three testified for them. The three who did so testified on December 18, and told the court that Prendergast was insane and therefore not responsible for his actions in killing Harrison.

There had been much public surprise at the fact that the four of the eight expert witnesses that the prosecution had originally intended to call had become positioned to testify in support of the defense's case. Publicly, the prosecutors insinuated that these doctors may have been bribed. Judge Brentano allowed for jurors to be kept from knowing that several of the doctors testifying for the defense were doctors that the prosecution originally intended to have as witnesses, so long as the prosecution desired to leave this unknown. Judge Brentano disallowed the defense to tell the jury that the prosecution had previously intended to call the same experts witnesses that would now be testifying in support of the defense's position.

Trude was upset that the doctors who the prosecution had previously compensated were now testifying as defense witnesses. He alleged to the court (Note: "The State has been tricked....and some of the doctors who will take the stand for the defense are the very doctors who were called together by the State along with others, to formulate a line of prosecution. Some of these men attended the conferences, gave their opinions to the representatives of the State, learned the policy of the prosecution, and now they are to take the stand for the other side armed with every particle of data that the prosecution has gathered. You can say for me that certain organizations have raised money for the defense of the murder of Carter Harrison, and I would not hesitate to say that money has been freely used by the defense in securing expert testimony.") that he believed the state had been "tricked" by these doctors and the defense, noting that the doctors' examination of Prendergast had been at their behest and alleging that the defense had paid-off the doctors.

The first of these doctors to testify was Archibald Church. When questioned, Church explained (Note: "I was employed by State’s Attorney Kern to make an examination of Prendergast, and to report to him as to his mental condition, and whether he was mentally responsible for the crime. Since that time I have been subpoenaed for the defense. Of course, I had to obey the law and come. I have told what I think of the man, and that I consider him crazy.") the circumstances of his testimony, including that he had examined Prendergast at the behest of the state Wade asked Church a long hypothetical which took several-minutes to lay out, describing an individual mirroring Prendergast and actions mirroring those of Prendergast before asking Church what his professional opinion would be on such an individual. Church answered that he would consider such an individual insane, and specified that he would consider them to be suffering paranoia. During the prosecution's cross-examination, he testified that he did not believe phrenology (which Talbot's testimony had been grounded in) to be an entirely reliable means of determining insanity.

Dr. D. R. Brower testified that, having twice conducted in-depth medical examinations of Prendergast (which included an examination in which he had Prendergast stropped naked so that he could examine the entire surface of Prendergast's body), he had concluded that Prendergast indeed was insane. His conclusion was that Prendergast was, in specific, suffering from a paranoia causing him to suffer logical delusions of two types: persecutory delusions and self-exaltation. Brower offered the professional opinion that while Prendergast might be responsible for most of his actions, he was not responsible for actions related to his delusions. Dr. John H. Slayter and Dr. F. Kiernan thereafter testified to the same beliefs and facts that Dr. Brower had.

=== December 19 ===
==== Testimony of expert witnesses: Dr. Richard Dewey (for supt. of Kankakee Insane Asylum), Dr. William Bain (physician), Dr. Frank Wail (Assistant Cook County Physician), Dr. Church ====
On December 19, the first witness was Dr. Richard Dewey, who had previously served as superintendent of the Kankakee Insane Asylum. Wade posed a long hypothetical of an individual mirroring Prendergast's profile and how Dewey would diagnose an individual base off of that description. Dewey was given a type-written copy of the hypothetical to review, and answered that he would infer that such an individual was insane, specifically suffering paranoia or monomania. Bain testified (Note: "Assuming the facts here are true, I should he was not mentally sound; that he was insane. I examined [Prendergast] four times. He is afflicted with a form of mental defect due to imperfect development of his faculties and known as "paranoia". I reached the conclusion that he knew the act he did was contrary to the law and contrary to the moral law. [But was it was not possible for him to refrain from the actions he took in killing Harrison even if he had wanted to refrain], I think he was impelled by his own delusions to do the act.") that Prendergast's delusions had been caused him to act beyond his own control in murdering Prendergast. During cross examination by Trude about Prendergast's actions and statements, Trude extracted answers from him that were far less favorable to the defense, and undermined the answers Dewey presented in the defense's questioning about Prendergast evidencing insanity and having lacked the knowledge and ability to refrain from killing Harrison.

The defense posited to the same hypothetical it asked to Dewey to Dr. William Bain (a physician) and Dr. Frank Wail (the Assistant Cook County Physician), both of whom offered similar answers to those Bain had given in response to the hypothetical. Afterwards, Dr. Church returned to the stand for further testimony, during which he announced that, when also considering evidence beyond his own previous examination of Prendergast alongside Dr. Brower, he would regard Prendergast to be suffering paranoia. The defense had wanted to question an additional doctor, Dr. Mayer, but he could not be found. They hoped to question him the following day, but his whereabouts were also unable to be found then as well.

==== Testimony of W. H. H. Weston (witness) ====
After these medical testimonies, W. H. H. Weston (secretary of the Union Trust company) was called by the defense to the stand a witness . He testified that on the day of the shooting, Prendergast visited the Unity Building and requested to meet with Illinois Governor John Peter Altgeld about matters he claimed were both personal and important. He did not saay whether Prendergast managed to meet the governor that day, but he did recount that Prendergast had appeared pale and looked excited, and that his lips had quivered during the interaction. After Weston's testimony, the defense rested.

== Testimony during the prosecution's rebuttal ==
=== December 19 ===
==== Testimony of W. G. McRea ====
The prosecution's rebuttal began with testimony from W. G. McRea (a reporter of the City Press Association) who testified about having interviewed Prendergast's mother on the night of the assassination and recounted that in her interview with McRea she had entirely denied Prendergast was insane, instead saying that he was a smart guy who merely spoke obsessively on the topic of Henry George.

==== Testimony of various work acquaintances of Prendergast ====
The second witness called in the prosecution's rebuttal was J. H. Johnson, who worked as circulator at the newspaper that had employed Prendergast as a distributor. Johnson described Prendergast as possessing good intelligence and memory. He recounted that on the day of the assassination he had complained to Prendergast that a patron had failed to receive his newspaper. He recalled Prendergast as getting a bit frustrated by this, but reacting in a manner that was entirely normal. Based on his interactions with Prendergast, Johnson expressed his confidence that he had been a sane individual up through at least 3pm on the day of the assassination. Several of Johnson's other employees (Note: these corroborating witnesses were E.A. Lane, Brooks Evans, Edward Day, John Ballenforst) testified to corroborate his testimony.

Next, several witnesses (Note: these witnesses included Frank Smith (a papercutter), J.M. Martin (a clerk), John Doody (a cashier of a newspaper circulating company), Henry Osterman and Pat Kenney (both of whom worked for another of the city's newspapers), Police Officer Doherty (assigned to patrol the safety of newsboys on Calhoun Place), Officer George Dewey (a special policeman assigned to patrol newsboys), Antone Horn (who been a neighbor of the Prendergast household in 1879)) were called to provide brief testimony about their acquaintanceship with Prendergast, his off-putting traits, and their belief that he was entirely sane. Many of these witnesses were also employed in the news distribution business or related jobs.

=== December 20 ===
==== Testimony of further work acquaintances of Prendergast (Charles Kessler, E.W. Jenks, E.M. Goodrich) ====
On December 20, the first witness to testify was Charles Kessler, who had been a news delivery patron of Prendergast up to the day of the murder, and testified to having never noticed anything to indicate he was insane. E.W. Jenks testified to having known Prendergast for six years through paper sales, and to having also never believed him to be insane. An independent news carrier named E. M. Goodrich testified that he had known Prendergast for four months, and had been employing him to work an afternoon route on Clark Street up until after the assassination. He testified to have been with Prendergast from 3pm until 4:30 that day, having assisted him on his route. He testified that during this time, Prendergast had talked to him about a variety of topics (including religion, single tax, the silver debate, grade separation of railroad tracks, and that he believed that the priest Father Kelley would do a better job as Corporation Counsel than Kraus was doing) in a manner that appeared intelligent, and that he believed Prendergast to be sane.

==== Testimony by J.C. Short (acquaintance of Prendergast) ====
J.B. Short (attorney and president of the Young People's Society of St. Columbkill's Church) testified to having known Prendergast for five years, and interacted with him between two and three times a week over the duration of two years at meetings of the Young People's Society of St. Columbkill's Church. He characterized Prendergast as being unbearably egotistical, but also intelligent and sane with strong familiarity about subject related to the law (such as being able to properly quote William Blackstone). He also noted that Prendergast had expressed a desire to become a great criminal attorney.

==== Testimony by John Quinn (police sergeant) ====
Police sergeant John Quinn testified that late on the night of the assassination, he and another police officer visited Prendergast's mother, followed in toll by news reporters. He testified that this appeared to be the first that she had heard of Harrison's killing, and that she replied to questioning that night that her son had not visited her in two years, that he was not insane, that he was quite smart, that he had never suffered a fall or typhoid fever, and that he was overbearingly passionate when talking about the subject of Henry George.

==== Testimony of further work acquaintances of Prendergast ====
Several newspaper delivery co-workers (Note: these witnesses included Martin Ackerman and S. Hopkins (news carriers), Henry Van Loon (superintendent of a newspaper ailing room who had sold newspapers to Prendergast for five years), Phil O'Connor (manager of the news delivery division of the News and Record who had known Prendergast for years), S.T. Lee cashier in the Inter Ocean circulator's office), W.J. Hall and J.T. White (employees of the Inter Ocean circulator's office)) also testified, all of whom asserted that they believed Prendergast to be sane, and many further testifying to his intelligence. One co-worker, news carrier Martin Ackerman, testified to Prendergast's intelligence, opining that he had the capacity to be a lawyer or a preacher. He also, similar to earlier witness Edward O. Brown, recounted having been asked by Prendergast for a loan of money. Phil O'Connor (manager of the Chicago News and Record delivery division) testified that in his years of knowing Prendergast professionally, nothing had stood out about him besides his use of advanced vocabulary, his sense of self-importance, and the fact that he routinely was the first paper deliverer to pick-up the papers for his route. News reporter E. G. Westlake testified that in many conversations that he had had with Prendergast he found him to present as sane, rational, smart, and shrewd.

==== Testimony by J. E. Davis, H. U. Bailey, and James O'D. Bennett (news reporters); Michael Brennan (chief of police) ====
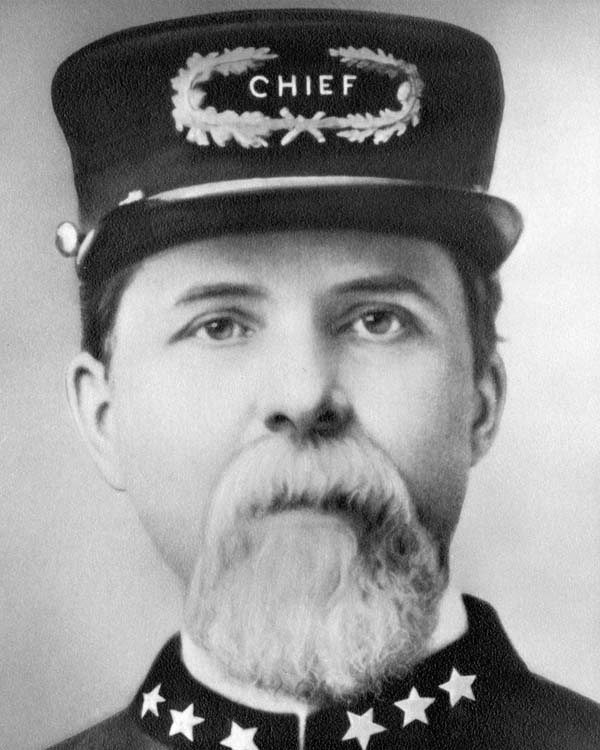
Michael Brennan (chief of the Chicago Police Department) testified on December 20

Next to testify were reporters J. E. Davis and H. U. Bailey, whose testimony corroborated that which Sergeant Quinn had delivered earlier that day. Michael Brennan (chief of the Chicago Police Department) then testified, identifying for the court a postcard that had been written to him by Prendergast expressing gratitude to the city's police for their kind treatment of him. It was asserted that the card was written in a rational manner. News reporter James O'D. Bennett testified that, while at the Cook County Jail, he had heard physician Dr. William Bain (who had testified for the defense) describe Prendergast as cunning and among the shrewdest men he had ever encountered. Bennett expressed great bother at Bain having testified in support of the defense's assertion that Prendergast was insane.

=== December 21 ===
==== Testimony of Corporation Counsel Adolph Kraus (recalled witness), Judge Horton and jail employees Robert Wallace and Benjamin Price ====
On December 21, Corporation Counsel Kraus (who had testified for the defense) was recalled by the prosecution for further testimony. He testified about his encounter with Prendergast when Prendergast had visited his office. He testified that when Prendergast had conducted himself in a quiet and civil manner, and that Kraus at the time believed that the best course of action to take was merely to humor Prendergast's assertions. He testified that he had also witnessed Prendergast's conduct during the inquest that followed the assassination, and believed that Prendergast had in that venue exhibited the behavior of a coward and a man afflicted by guilt.

Judge Horton, before whom Prendergast had been arraigned. His testimony came despite the fact that his encounter with Prendergast during the arraignment had been only approximately a mere ten minutes in duration. He testified that during the arraignment Prendergast's face was pale, his body was shaking, his voice was extremely quiet, and that he was the most scared-looking man that he had ever seen. He asserted that while Prendergast emotionally distressed during his arraignment, he entirely believed him to be a sane man.

Jail Guard Robert Wallace gave testimony that Prendergast had initially spoken openly about the murder and had told others that the act of killing Harrison was justified and that he believed that he would be protected by public sentiment in support of that act, but that after Prendergast had consulted with legal counsel he avoided discussing the topic. He also testified that Prendergast had clung to Wallace for protection when he encountered other prisoners who shouted "hang him", and that Prendergast would complain that he found the guarding provided at the prison to be insufficient. He also testified that when Harrison's funeral procession passed the Cook County Jail, Prendergast had complained about it was poor organization for it to pass by the jail where he was being detained.

Deputy jailer Benjamin Price (who had earlier been called as a witness by the prosecution) testified that he regularly spoke with Prendergast at the jail, and that he had found him to always present as completely rational. Price also testified that Prendergast had expressed the belief that executing him would be murder, because it was of public benefit to shoot Harrison due to the fact that Harrison was refusing to make him corporation counsel.

==== Testimony of John C. Spray (expert witness) ====
John C. Spray (who had for ten years served as the superintendent of Dunning Asylum) testified that he had observed Prendergast's behavior throughout the entire trial, and that he believed he was sane and responsible for his actions. Spray also testified about having had the opportunity to freely speak with Prendergast at the Cook County Jail during several visits, the first of which had been two or three days after the assassination. He testified that in their conversations, Prendergast had agreed with the notion that he was "in a pretty bad fix," and had expressed to Spray his belief in his ability to serve as corporation counsel despite lacking law credentials. Spray testified that Prendergast had expressed his belief after being appointed corporation counsel, he could make decisions about litigation in a general supervising manner and have assistants act as attorneys to carry out the specifics of litigation.

==== Testimony of further laywitnesses: Edward Normile and Charles Welles ====
Several other witnesses testified. Edward Normile, testified that he had been deskmates with Prendergast at school and that he believed Prendergast to be sane. Charles Welles, a news writer, identified a note written by Prendergast.

==== Testimony by Dr. Bluthardt (former Cook County Physician, expert witness) ====
Dr. Bluthardt (the former Cook County Physician) testified to his own credentials of having examined 10,000 insane individuals, and testified that (in his analysis of Prendergast's case) he could without hesitation judge Prendergast to be sane.

=== December 22: expert witness testimony by physicians ===
The first witness to testify on December 22 was Dr. Henry M. Lyman, an expert witness. Lyman opined that he considered Prendergast to be sane. Prosecuting attorney Todd asked Lyman a long hypothetical about an individual mirroring Prendergast and his actions, and whether such an individual would be sane. During cross-examination, defense attorney Wade managed to have Lyman concede that every action described in Todd's hypothetical could also have been performed by an insane individual, and that an insane and irresponsible man acting under the influence of delusions could still carry a false appearance of sanity in many aspects.

Dr. John Benson (who had for two years been supervisor at the Dunning asylum) testified that his examination of Prendergast at the prison and observations of Prendergast in the courtroom left him to believe that Prendergast was sane. Benson testified that Prendergast had told him he killed Harrison because god had ordered him to do so, and that Prendergast also asserted the believe that it would be preferable for the corporation to be a well-educated individual without legal credentials than a lawyer who is not well-educated. Benson also testified that he had asked Prendergast if he would have committed the same act against Harrison again if he hypothetically could found himself in the same scenario, and that Prendergast had answered, "I didn't think that the people would take the affair the way they did. If I had to do it over again, it would be entirely different."

Dr. H. I. Baxter testified that he visited Prendergast at the jail, but that Prendergast was aware that he came on behalf of the prosecution, and had argued his sanity to Baxter before then refusing to speak any further. Baxter opined that the actions he had observed of Prendergast's in the courtroom led him to believe without doubt that (while Prendergast was a feeble-minded and eccentric, vain, pompous, and morose man) he was not insane.

Reporter J. E. Payne corroborated the earlier testimony of James O'D. Bennett (who had testified on December 20) as to remarks uttered by Dr. William Bain, after which Dr. James K. Egbert (a former assistant Cook County physician) testified that having watched Prendergast in the court, he considered him to his actions to be those of a sane individual.

Dr. Nathan Davis testified to his own credential of having been a medical jurisprudence teacher of twenty years, and further testified that (having examined Prendergast at the Cook County Jail) he considered Prendergast to be a sane man lacking any fixed hallucination or delusion. He asserted that there was no reason to doubt his self control, and that he was merely a man that had been motivated by his own self-exaltation and conceitedness. Davis also disagreed with the assertion by the defense that examination of the shape of a person's head and jaws could be used to determine whether or not that person is sane.

Dr. Leonard St. John testified that, based upon his visit to Prendergast at the Cook County Jail, he believed that Prendergast was sane. He also testified that Prendergast had told him he had committed the murder because it was god's will for him to do so, but that he would not do it if given the chance to go back to that night because other people had not responded to the act the way that he had anticipated that they would. St. John additionally testified that Prendergast had led him understand he was intent on leaving Chicago if acquitted, due to his desire to cease residing in a city where people were dying from incidents at railroad level crossings.

Shortly after the trial, one of the jurymen recounted that, "Dr. St. John's clear method of explaining paranoia and chronic delusion, coupled with the testimony of Dr. Davis," were main factors motivating the jury's finding of Prendergast to be sane.

=== December 23 ===
==== Testimony by Dr. Charles Gatchel and Dr. Silas Yount (expert witnesses) ====
December 23, Dr. Charles Gatchel testified that his examination of Prendergast at the Cook County Jail led him to consider Prendergast to be sane. He opined that a nervous and uneasy Prendergast had faked unintelligent behavior when they spoke, with Prendergast having declared to him, "I am interested in religion more than anything else. I am a martyr. I am a martyr." Dr. Silas Yount testified that he had spoken with Prendergast for two hours, and that Prendergast had been quiet and reasonable in their conversation. He further testified that Prendergast had stated his reason for killing Harrison was to ensure the elevation of the city's railroad tracks, and that Prendergast also had told him he had never consumed liquor. Yount opined that there was nothing wrong with Prendergast's head or jaw shape, and that he believed Prendergast to be sane.

==== Testimony by N. K. Morris (jailer) and Dr. John C. Spray (recalled expert witness) ====
Jailer N. K. Morris testified that Prendergast conducted himself at the Cook County Jail in a manner typical of prisoners, and that he believed that Prendergast was sane. He also corroborated the earlier testimony of James O'D. Bennett (who had testified on December 20) as to remarks uttered by Dr. William Bain while at the jail.

For the final testimony in the Prosecution's rebuttal, Dr. John C. Spray was recalled to testify merely to the fact that he had found Prendergast to have a normal pulse and body temperature when he had examined him.

== Testimony during the defense's rebuttal ==
The first witness called for the defense's rebuttal was Robert J. Boylar, a reporter for the City Press Association. He testified that Prendergast's conduct in the courtroom had not changed after the testimony of experts, contrary to that assertion made in the earlier testimony of E. G. Westlake during the prosecution's rebuttal on December 20. Prendergast's brother John Prendergast testified to deny that Edward Normile, contrary to Normile's assertion in his December 21 testimony in the prosecution's rebuttal.

The final witness of the defense's rebuttal was John Davin, whose testimony was to illustrate family a history of insanity exhibited by Prendergast's grandfather, William Prendergast. Davin testified that when he was a child in Ireland he had known William Prendergast. He testified that William Prendergast had become insane after losing his arm to gunfire in a military battle, resulting in the elder Prendergast's longtime confinement in a Ballyclogh insane asylum. Davin further testified that he had been scared during encounters with the elder Prendergast due to the level of insanity he had exhibited.

The defense attempted to compel Henry George to testify as a witness, even subpoenaing his testimony. However, George had managed to evade service of the subpoena and the defense rested its case without his testimony.
