= Joe Downing =

American actor (1903–1975)

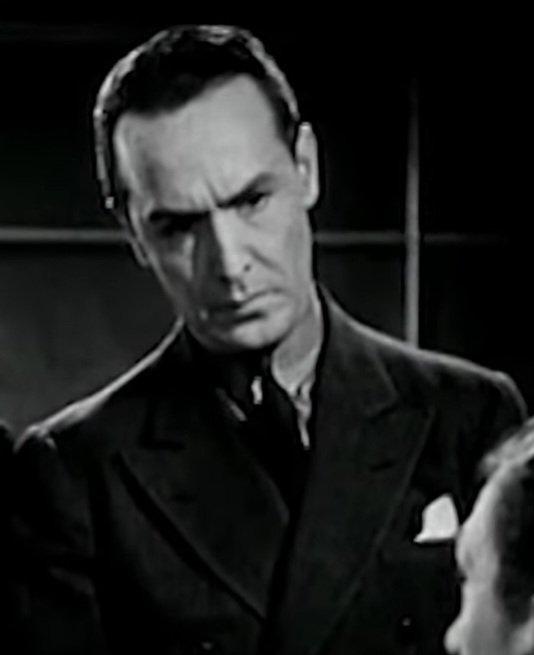
- Downing in The Devil's Party (1938)
- Born: June 26, 1903; New York City, U.S.
- Died: October 16, 1975 (aged 72); Canoga Park, California, U.S.
- Occupation: Actor
- Years active: 1935–1963

Joe Downing (June 26, 1903 – October 16, 1975) was an American stage, TV and B-movie actor who made more than 70 appearances.

== Career ==
Downing's early acting experience included work with the Theatre Guild, particularly dancing in The Garrick Gaieties. His Broadway credits include Ramshackle Inn (1944), Cross-town (1937), Dead End (1935), Ceiling Zero (1935), Page Miss Glory (1934), The Drums Begin (1933), Heat Lightning (1933), Shooting Star (1933), and A Farewell to Arms (1930).

Downing's film debut came in Doctor Socrates. Often cast as gangsters, his film credits include A Slight Case of Murder, Danger on the Air, Racket Busters, Each Dawn I Die, and The Big Shot. His television credits include three appearances on Alfred Hitchcock Presents from 1956 to 1958, as well as other anthology series popular during the era.

== Filmography ==
=== Film ===
- The Case of the Lucky Legs (1935) as George Sanborne
- Dr. Socrates (1935) as Cinq Laval
- Borrowing Trouble (1937) as Charlie
- A Slight Case of Murder (1938) as Innocence
- Wide Open Faces (1938) as Stretch
- The Lady in the Morgue (1938) as Steve Collins
- The Devil's Party (1938) as Frank Diamond
- Danger on the Air (1938) as Joe Carney
- Racket Busters (1938) as Joe Pender, Martin's Henchman
- I Am the Law (1938) as Tom Cronin (uncredited)
- The Night Hawk (1938) as Lefty
- Angels with Dirty Faces (1938) as Steve
- North of Shanghai (1939) as Chandler
- You Can't Get Away with Murder (1939) as Smitty
- Torchy Runs for Mayor (1939) as Spuds O'Brien
- The Forgotten Woman (1939) as Johnny Bradshaw
- Each Dawn I Die (1939) as Limpy Julien
- Smashing the Money Ring (1939) as Dice Mathews
- Beware Spooks! (1939) (uncredited)
- Missing Evidence (1939) as Marty Peters
- Another Thin Man (1939) as Hoodlum (uncredited)
- Invisible Stripes (1939) as Johnny
- Oh Johnny, How You Can Love (1940) as 'Doc' Kendrick, Bank Robber
- Castle on the Hudson (1940) as Gangster in Car (uncredited)
- Sandy Is a Lady (1940) as Nick Case
- The Secret Seven (1940) as Lou Bodie
- The San Francisco Docks (1940) as Cassidy
- Tall, Dark and Handsome (1941) as Cigar Store Killer (uncredited)
- Double Date (1941) as Burglar
- Strange Alibi (1941) as Benny McKaye
- Belle Starr (1941) as Jim Cole
- Unholy Partners (1941) as Jerry, Henchman
- Johnny Eager (1941) as Ryan
- Sealed Lips (1942) as Trigger Dolan (uncredited)
- Larceny, Inc. (1942) as Smitty
- My Gal Sal (1942) as Slip (uncredited)
- The Big Shot (1942) as Frenchy (credited as Joseph Downing)
- You Can't Escape Forever (1942) as Varney (uncredited)
- Lucky Jordan (1942) as Harrison (uncredited)
- Las Vegas Shakedown (1955) as Henchman Matty
- Fighting Trouble (1956) as Handsome Hal Lomax
- Slaughter on Tenth Avenue (1957) as Eddie 'Cockeye' Cook

=== Television ===
Joe Downing television credits
Year	Title	Role	Notes	Ref.
1956	Alfred Hitchcock Presents	Lieutenant Al Hawkshaw	Episode: "The Big Switch" (S1.E15) (as Joseph Downing)	
1956	Alfred Hitchcock Presents	Floyd Unser	Episode: "Place of Shadows" (S1.E22) (as Joseph Downing)	
1958	Alfred Hitchcock Presents	Detective Kramer	Episode: "Bull in a China Shop" (S3.E26)	
