= These Glamour Girls =

1939 film by S. Sylvan Simon

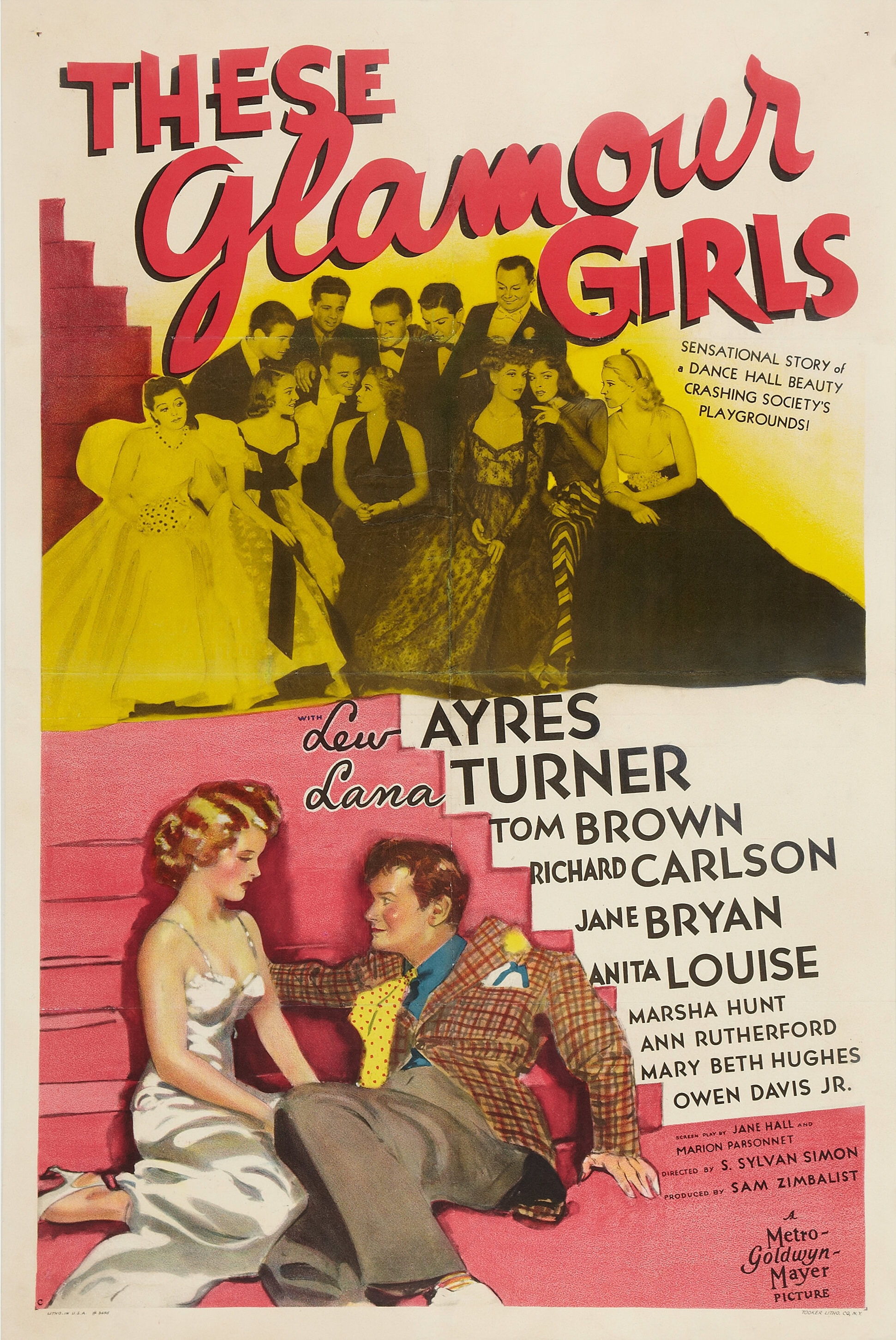
- Theatrical release poster
- Directed by: S. Sylvan Simon
- Screenplay by: Marion Parsonnet
- Based on: These Glamour Girls by Jane Hall
- Produced by: Sam Zimbalist
- Starring: Lew Ayres; Lana Turner; Tom Brown; Richard Carlson; Jane Bryan; Anita Louise; Marsha Hunt; Ann Rutherford; Mary Beth Hughes; Owen Davis Jr.
- Cinematography: Alfred Gilks
- Edited by: Harold F. Kress
- Music by: David Snell; Edward Ward
- Production company: Metro-Goldwyn-Mayer
- Distributed by: Loew's Inc.
- Release date: August 18, 1939
- Running time: 79 minutes
- Country: United States
- Language: English
- Budget: $403,000
- Box office: $580,000

These Glamour Girls is a 1939 American screwball comedy drama film directed by S. Sylvan Simon and starring Lew Ayres and Lana Turner. A satire on social class, the film follows an uppercrust male college student (Ayres) who drunkenly invites a taxi dancer (Turner) to spend the weekend with him at his snobbish college. It is based on a story of the same name by Jane Hall, originally published in Cosmopolitan magazine. Tom Brown, Jane Bryan, Richard Carlson, Anita Louise, Marsha Hunt, and Ann Rutherford appear in supporting roles.

== Plot ==
Members of an elite New York social register, all parents of debutante daughters, discuss a forthcoming house party planned at the prestigious Kingsford College. Wealthy debutante Ann van Reichton receives a bit to attend a Kingsford Party, but her mother is horrified upon finding that her date, a young man named Greg, is not a part of the social register.

The weekend before the party, student Philip Griswold, the son of a prestigious Wall Street stockbroker, visits Manhattan with his friends Homer Ten Eyck and Greg Smith. While visiting bars in the city, Philip gets drunk and invites Jane, a taxi dancer from Kansas, to attend the party. Jane accepts the offer, though Philip forgets about his invitation.

Days later, Philip awaits his girlfriend Carol at the Kingsford train station, and is embarrassed to find Jane has arrived on the same train. Humiliated, Jane nearly returns to the city before Blimpy, a fellow Kingsford student, mistakes her for a member of an elite Philadelphia social circle, and asks her to be his date to the party. Upon learning that Jane grew up on a farm and is not in fact from an elite background, he rebuffs her. A remorseful Phil asks Jane to stay. Phil and Jane dance together, while Carol dances with Joe, one of the college's poorest students who comes from a working class family. Carol confesses to Joe that she is dating Phil in hopes of securing financial stability, as her father has recently lost his family fortune.

The following morning, Daphne Graves, a cruel and manipulative debutante, talks Phil and Carol into announcing their engagement. The announcement upsets both Jane and Joe, who leave the gathering together. Meanwhile, twenty year-old debutante Betty Ainsbrudge overhears her younger peers making jokes about her being too old to court a husband. Betty responds by attempting to convince a drunken Homer into marrying her. Homer initially agrees, but ultimately refuses after he becomes sober. A despondent Betty commits suicide by parking her car on railroad tracks, allowing a train to strike her.

After the party, Phil's family's reputation is tarnished after his father is indicted for fraud, humiliating him and forcing him to reconsider his superficial values, ultimately realizing his love for Jane.

== Cast ==
- Lew Ayres as Philip S. 'Phil' Griswold III
- Lana Turner as Jane Thomas
- Tom Brown as Homer Ten Eyck
- Richard Carlson as Joe
- Jane Bryan as Carol Christy
- Anita Louise as Daphne 'Daph' Graves
- Marsha Hunt as Betty Ainsbridge
- Ann Rutherford as Mary Rose Wilston
- Mary Beth Hughes as Ann van Reichton
- Owen Davis Jr. as Greg Smith
- Ernest Truex as Alumnus of Harvard
- Sumner Getchell as Blimpy
- Peter Lind Hayes as Skel Lorimer (as Peter Hayes)
- Don Castle as Jack
- Tom Collins as Tommy Torgler

== Production ==
=== Development ===
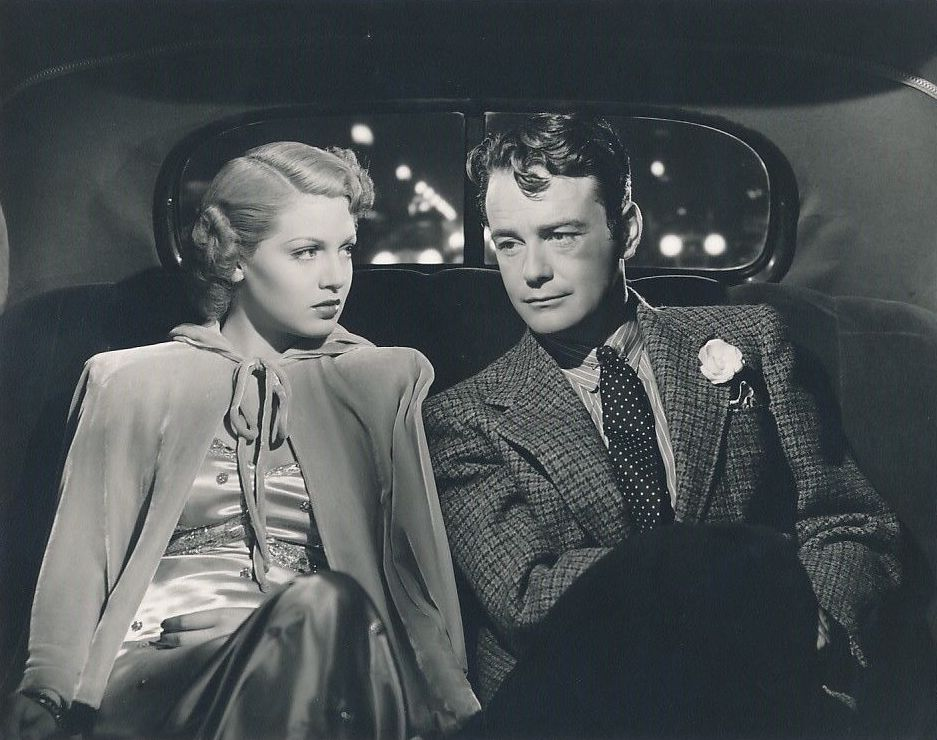
Lana Turner and Lew Ayres in These Glamour Girls

These Glamour Girls was adapted by screenwriter Marion Parsonnet from a story by Jane Hall of the same name, originally published in Cosmopolitan magazine in December 1938. Hall based numerous elements of the screenplay on the social life of Princeton University students.

Film censors expressed some hesitancy over the screenplay due to its depiction of youth alcohol consumption, implied sexual activity, suicide, and an "unflattering" depiction of U.S. sailors engaging in a brawl.

=== Casting ===
Lew Ayres was given top-billing in the production as Philip S. Griswold, while a teenage Lana Turner was cast in the role of Jane. Marsha Hunt was given a supporting role as Betty Ainsbridge, a twenty year-old debutante. Hunt later recalled that the film marked her first "offbeat role," and she would go on to cite it as one of her favorite films she had made.

=== Filming ===
During production, director S. Sylvan Simon requested that the cast commit to a "no dating" policy with the hope that "none of their natural vivacity or glamour would be dimmed by the strain of social activity."

== Release ==
These Glamour Girls was released theatrically in the United States on August 18, 1939.

=== Home media ===
The film was made available on DVD through the Warner Archive Collection on July 6, 2010.

== Reception ==
=== Box office ===
According to MGM records the film earned $420,000 in the US and Canada and $160,000 elsewhere resulting in a loss of $33,000.

=== Critical response ===
These Glamour Girls received generally favorable reviews. The Film Daily praised the film, writing that it "combines good production by Sam Zimbalist, excellent direction by S. Sylvan Simon, and fine acting by the entire cast, [making] this picture grand entertainment for any theater and on any bill."

Wanda Hale of the New York Daily News gave it a mixed assessment, writing that it "flounders around in a futile effort to show snobbishness to be one of the major sins," and felt Ayres was miscast as a college student. Variety was similarly critical of Ayres' performance, writing that he "struggles hard to overcome the silly situations and mawkish lines," though the publication conceded that Simon's direction is "not half bad compared to... what he had to work with." Jane Hall, the author of the story on which the film was based, expressed dislike for it. After attending a preview screening, she said: "They gave it cheap production, the worst director on the lot, and a no-name cast."

In a retrospective for Turner Classic Movies, Frank Miller wrote of the film: "Since Turner wasn't a big marquee name yet, MGM matched her with a quartet of female co-stars who all add to the film's luster... Within a few years, Turner would move up to star status, leaving little time for ensemble pieces like this. But while it lasted, she helped bring a youthful buoyancy to MGM's films that's hard to resist."

== Sources ==
- Tucker, David C. (2021). S. Sylvan Simon, Moviemaker: Adventures with Lucy, Red Skelton and Harry Cohn in the Golden Age of Hollywood. Jefferson, North Carolina: McFarland & Company. ISBN 978-1-476-68219-8.
- Umphlett, Wiley Lee (1984). The Movies Go to College: Hollywood and the World of the College-life Film. Madison, New Jersey: Fairleigh Dickinson University Press. ISBN 978-0-838-63133-1.
