= Girls on Probation =

1938 film by William C. McGann

- Theatrical release poster
- Directed by: William C. McGann
- Written by: Crane Wilbur
- Produced by: Bryan Foy
- Starring: Jane Bryan; Ronald Reagan; Anthony Averill; Sheila Bromley; Henry O'Neill; Elisabeth Risdon
- Cinematography: Arthur L. Todd
- Edited by: Frederick Richards
- Music by: Howard Jackson
- Production company: Warner Bros. Pictures
- Distributed by: Warner Bros. Pictures
- Release date: August 22, 1938
- Running time: 63 minutes
- Country: United States
- Language: English

Girls on Probation is a 1938 American crime film directed by William C. McGann and written by Crane Wilbur. The film stars Jane Bryan, Ronald Reagan, Anthony Averill, Sheila Bromley, Henry O'Neill and Elisabeth Risdon. The film was released by Warner Bros. Pictures on August 22, 1938.

== Plot ==
Innocent young Connie Heath is persuaded to borrow a party dress from her friend, "fast girl" Hilda Engstrom, who has actually misappropriated it from the dry cleaner where she works. After the real owner of the dress, witchy Gloria Adams, spots Connie out in the dress (which is subsequently torn in a car door), Connie is falsely accused of theft and prosecuted as Hilda flees town and leaves her to take the blame. Though Gloria withdraws her charge, the insurance company continues to persecute poor Connie, resulting in a charge of grand larceny. Championing her cause is crusading attorney Neil Dillon - coincidentally, also Connie's date on the evening in question- who gets Connie off with probation.

Connie leaves town after being mistreated by her unsympathetic father and gets a job in order to pay for the damaged dress. One day she spots Hilda waiting in a parked car on the street and begins to argue with her in the car when Hilda's boyfriend emerges from a bank he has just robbed, fleeing the scene with Connie in tow. She is arrested and convicted while refusing to give her real name or full story for fear of humiliating her family.

Eventually the truth begins to emerge, and Connie is given probation, returns home, and becomes engaged to Dillon. When Hilda is given probation, she returns to town as well, to make even more trouble for Connie, especially after her boyfriend escapes prison.

== Cast ==
- Jane Bryan as Connie Heath
- Ronald Reagan as Neil Dillon
- Anthony Averill as Tony Rand
- Sheila Bromley as Hilda Engstrom
- Henry O'Neill as Judge
- Elisabeth Risdon as Kate Heath
- Sig Ruman as Roger Heath
- Dorothy Peterson as Jane Lennox
- Susan Hayward as Gloria Adams
- Larry Williams as Terry Mason, Hilda's Date
- Arthur Hoyt as Mr. Engstrom
- Emory Parnell as Officer Craig
- Peggy Shannon as Inmate (uncredited)
