= Each Dawn I Die =

1939 gangster film directed by William Keighley

- Directed by: William Keighley
- Screenplay by: Warren Duff; Norman Reilly Raine; Charles Perry (uncredited)
- Based on: Each Dawn I Die; 1938 novel by Jerome Odlum
- Produced by: David Lewis (associate producer); Hal B. Wallis (executive producer)
- Starring: James Cagney; George Raft; Jane Bryan; George Bancroft; Maxie Rosenbloom
- Cinematography: Arthur Edeson
- Edited by: Thomas Richards
- Music by: Max Steiner
- Distributed by: Warner Bros. Pictures
- Release date: July 22, 1939
- Running time: 92 minutes
- Language: English
- Budget: $735,000
- Box office: $1,570,000

Each Dawn I Die is a 1939 gangster film directed by William Keighley and starring James Cagney and George Raft. The plot involves an investigative reporter who is unjustly thrown in jail and befriends a famous gangster. The film was based on the novel of the same name by Jerome Odlum and the supporting cast features Jane Bryan, George Bancroft, Slapsie Maxie Rosenbloom, and Victor Jory.

== Plot ==
Frank Ross, a crusading newspaperman on the trail of a crooked district attorney, is framed for manslaughter and sentenced to a maximum 20 years in prison. There, he encounters the notorious Stacey, a lifer who is falsely accused of fatally stabbing a stool pigeon. Though Ross suspects Stacey is actually responsible, he keeps mum. A grateful Stacey agrees to help Ross prove he was framed. They arrange that Stacey be named by Ross in court as guilty of the stool pigeon's death before Stacey escapes the courthouse.

Ross promises to tell no one about the ruse, but antagonizes Stacey by tipping off his old newspaper, so that the courtroom is full of reporters. Realizing that Ross has betrayed him, Stacey escapes court by leaping from a window but makes no effort to find the real culprits responsible for Ross's predicament. Ross, meanwhile, is implicated in the escape and spends five months in solitary confinement, where he is handcuffed to the bars in the dark and fed bread and water once a day. But he repeatedly refuses to implicate Stacey. Later, Ross is promised a chance at parole by the warden if he reforms, but the crooked D. A. has become governor and appointed a crony to head the parole board. Ross's bid for release is turned down, meaning he must wait another five years before he can re-file.

Later, Ross discovers the nickname of the man who framed him: "Polecat." By coincidence, Polecat is currently incarcerated in the same prison. He is a hated jailhouse informant, widely disliked by the inmates. Meanwhile, Stacey, impressed with Ross being a "square guy," decides to go back to prison and force Polecat to confess. Stacey instigates a prison breakout as part of his plan and orders the prisoners to bring him Polecat. The warden is held hostage. As the National Guard successfully quells the escape attempt, the warden witnesses Polecat's confession to framing Ross. Thus, Ross is finally vindicated, Stacey and Polecat are later killed by Guard soldiers, and the governor and head of the parole board are indicted for murder.

== Cast ==
- James Cagney as Frank Ross
- George Raft as "Hood" Stacey
- Jane Bryan as Joyce Conover
- George Bancroft as Warden John Armstrong
- Maxie Rosenbloom as Convict Fargo Red
- Stanley Ridges as Meuller
- Alan Baxter as Carlisle
- Victor Jory as W.J. Grayce
- John Wray as Pete Kassock
- Edward Pawley as Dale
- Willard Robertson as Lang
- Emma Dunn as Mrs. Ross
- Paul Hurst as Garsky
- Louis Jean Heydt as Joe Lassiter
- Joe Downing as Limpy Julien
- Thurston Hall as Jesse Hanley
- William Davidson as Bill Mason
- Clay Clement as Stacey's attorney, Lockhart
- Charles Trowbridge as the Judge
- Harry Cording as Temple

== Production ==
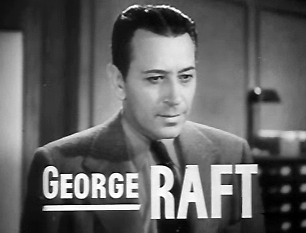
George Raft in 1939

The novel was published in 1938. Warner Bros. Pictures bought the film rights. According to David Lewis "The book had a strong plot with no real characters. It had originally been a Brynie Foy “B” picture; he gave it to me to read, saying it was too good for him and would make a successful “A” picture; he was right."

In May 1938, Warner Bros. announced it as a vehicle for James Cagney. Edward G. Robinson was discussed as a possible co-star. Robinson was then replaced by John Garfield and Michael Curtiz was set to direct.

Eventually Curtiz was replaced by William Keighley. Fred MacMurray was going to replace Garfield - as the reporter with Cagney to play the gangster. MacMurray became unavailable so Keighley tested Jeffrey Lynn. Eventually George Raft signed to make the movie. He swapped roles so he played the gangster and Cagney played the reporter.

Lewis said he pushed for Raft, whose fee was $50,000. "I could have had Humphrey Bogart, who, strangely enough, would not have been as positivea force as Raft," wrote the producer. "Bogie had a tendency to sleep through the things he wasn’t much interested in. Raft, on the other hand, had just been let go by Paramount and had something to prove. "

Norman Reilly Raine did the first draft. Producer David Lewis said he disliked it and had Warren Duff work on it. Lewis wrote, "Warren was a pedestrian writer, but far better for me than Raine. Keighley helped, and the final script was much better. I had wanted Mike Curtiz to direct it but didn’t get him, although he liked the material. Later, everyone agreed that Curtiz would have been a better choice, but Keighley was also a Wallis favorite."

Each Dawn I Die costars Raft and Cagney in their only movie together as leads. Raft had made an unbilled but memorable appearance in a 1932 Cagney vehicle called Taxi! in which he won a dance contest against Cagney, after which he and Cagney brawl. Raft also very briefly "appeared" in Cagney's boxing drama Winner Take All (1932), in a flashback sequence culled from Raft's 1929 film debut Queen of the Night Clubs starring Texas Guinan.

== Reception ==
=== Critical ===
Filmink magazine said "Raft's performance is electric – tightly wound, dialogue trimmed, using his eyes."

=== Box office ===
The film was one of Warner Bros.' most popular films in 1939. According to studio records it earned $1,111,000 domestically and $459,000 foreign. Lewis said this was a large profit than for the usual Cagney film.

It led to George Raft being offered a long-term contract by Warner Bros.

== Notes ==
- Lewis, David (1993). Curtis, James (ed.). The Creative Producer. Metuchen: Scarecrow Press. ISBN 0-8108-2720-4.
