= Nine Lives Are Not Enough =

1941 film by A. Edward Sutherland

- Theatrical release poster
- Directed by: A. Edward Sutherland
- Screenplay by: Fred Niblo Jr.
- Based on: Nine Lives Are Not Enough by Jerome Odlum
- Produced by: Bryan Foy
- Starring: Ronald Reagan; Joan Perry; James Gleason; Faye Emerson
- Cinematography: Ted D. McCord
- Edited by: Doug Gould
- Music by: William Lava
- Production company: Warner Bros. Pictures
- Distributed by: Warner Bros. Pictures
- Release date: September 20, 1941
- Running time: 63 minutes
- Country: United States
- Language: English

Nine Lives Are Not Enough is a 1941 American comedy mystery film directed by A. Edward Sutherland and starring Ronald Reagan, Joan Perry and James Gleason. The film was produced and released by Warner Bros. Pictures. It is based on the 1940 novel Nine Lives Are Not Enough by Jerome Odlum.

== Plot ==
A reporter tries to solve a series of boarding house murders. The dramatic main plot murder action is intermixed with farce and slapstick comedic elements.

== Cast ==
- Ronald Reagan as Matt Sawyer
- Joan Perry as Jane Abbott
- James Gleason as Sgt. Sam Daniels
- Howard Da Silva as J.B. Murray, City Editor
- Faye Emerson as Rose Chadwick
- Edward Brophy as Officer Slattery
- Peter Whitney as Roy
- Charles Drake as 'Snappy' Lucas
- Vera Lewis as Mrs. Slocum
- Ben Welden as Moxie Karper
- Howard C. Hickman as Colonel Andrews
- Cliff Clark as Lieutenant Buckley
- Tom Stevenson as Charles
- Paul Phillips as Hot-Foot
- Joseph Crehan as Yates
- John Maxwell as Gillis

== Bibliography ==
- Fetrow, Alan G. Feature Films, 1940-1949: a United States Filmography. McFarland, 1994.
- Vaughn, Stephen. Ronald Reagan in Hollywood: Movies and Politics. Cambridge University Press, 1994.
