= Invisible Stripes =

1939 film by Lloyd Bacon

- theatrical poster
- Directed by: Lloyd Bacon
- Written by: Jonathan Finn
- Screenplay by: Warren Duff
- Based on: Invisible Stripes; 1938 novel by Lewis E. Lawes
- Produced by: Hal B. Wallis; Jack L. Warner
- Starring: George Raft; Jane Bryan; William Holden; Humphrey Bogart
- Cinematography: Ernest Haller
- Edited by: James Gibbon
- Music by: Heinz Roemheld
- Production company: First National Pictures
- Distributed by: Warner Bros. Pictures
- Release date: December 30, 1939
- Running time: 81 minutes
- Country: United States
- Language: English
- Budget: $500,000

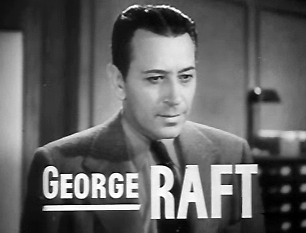
From the trailer

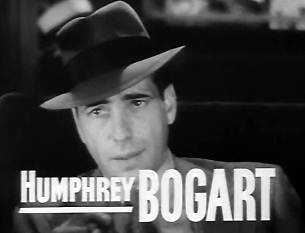
From the trailer

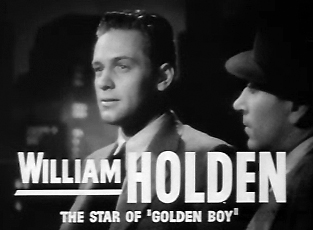
From the trailer

Invisible Stripes is a 1939 Warner Bros. crime film starring George Raft as a gangster unable to go straight after returning home from prison. The film was directed by Lloyd Bacon and also features William Holden, Jane Bryan and Humphrey Bogart. The screenplay by Warren Duff was based on the novel of the same title by Warden Lewis E. Lawes, a fervent crusader for prison reform, as adapted by Jonathan Finn.

== Plot ==
Cliff Taylor is an ex-con who wants to go straight, but since being released from prison on parole, he finds it hard to find and hold a job due to his criminal past. Cliff's younger brother Tim is worried and increasingly disillusioned because he cannot afford to marry his girlfriend Peggy and fears he will not be able to honestly find a position for himself in the world. Afraid that Tim might end up leading a life of crime like himself, Cliff decides to help him find the money to settle down. He tells his family he has found a job as a salesman, but in reality he reunites with fellow ex-convict Charles Martin and Martin's gang.

They organize a number of robberies. With the money he gets from his criminal activities, Cliff is able to buy a garage for his brother, who is now able to get married. His mission completed, Cliff decides to quit the gang. After a failed robbery in which people are killed, a wounded Martin and his pals hide in Tim's garage and force the young man to help them by telling him Cliff was part of the botched robbery. The police get wind that the gang was in the garage and arrest Tim as an accomplice. Cliff manages to swing a deal for his brother that will see him free of all charges, but he must identify the robbers and testify against them. Ahead of the police, Cliff goes to see Martin and tells him he must escape to avoid arrest and likely execution. However, Martin's pals, who have been shadowing Cliff since he quit the gang, see the two men together and move to prevent their escape. A shoot-out ensues, the police eventually become involved. Cliff and Martin are both killed. Later, Tim and Peggy admire the new sign over the garage advertising it as the Taylor Bros. Garage, and reflect on Cliff's sacrifice and how he will be considered a "silent partner".

== Cast ==
- George Raft as Cliff Taylor
- Jane Bryan as Peggy
- William Holden as Tim Taylor
- Humphrey Bogart as Charles Martin
- Flora Robson as Mrs. Taylor
- Henry O'Neill as Parole Officer Masters
- Paul Kelly as Ed Kruger
- Lee Patrick as Molly Daniels
- Marc Lawrence as Lefty Sloan
- Joe Downing as Johnny Hudson
- Tully Marshall as Old Peter
- Margot Stevenson as Sue
- Joseph Crehan as Mr. Chasen
- Chester Clute as Mr. Butler
- John Hamilton as Police Capt. Johnson
- Frankie Thomas as Tommy McNeill
- Moroni Olsen as Prison Warden
- William Haade as Shrank
- Emory Parnell as Policeman

Cast notes:

- Leo Gorcey, who would later become known for playing "Slip Mahoney" in the Bowery Boys series of films, has a small part as the head stockroom boy.

== Production ==
The film was originally set to star James Cagney and John Garfield. Raft then replaced Garfield. Holden ended up replacing Cagney. (The source for this information might have mistakenly reversed the names.) Raft had just signed a long-term contract with Warner Bros.

During a fight scene, William Holden accidentally hit George Raft and caused a gash.

Raft and Bogart made another film together the following year, Raoul Walsh's smash hit They Drive by Night, again starring Raft with Bogart billed fourth (under Raft, Ann Sheridan and Ida Lupino) in a supporting role.

Bogart and Holden worked together again fifteen years later in Sabrina, with Holden billed under Bogart and Audrey Hepburn.

== Reception ==
The film was only a minor success.

== Critical reaction ==
Time Out Film Guide calls Invisible Stripes "A thoroughly predictable tale of the tribulations of an ex-con." A New York Times review from 1940 commented about the unusual lack of prison scenes in the movie. "Let us hasten in all gratitude to add that Invisible Stripes is a prison picture in which the stripes are much less visible than usual, most of the action being paroled to the outside in the capable custody of George Raft, Jane Bryan, William Holden and Humphrey Bogart. There are no jute mill scenes, no bullying guards, no big prison break sequence; in fact, we don't understand why they've suddenly commuted our sentence from the customary duration of the picture to a brief prison prelude, a mere graduating exercise at the beginning: good behavior, maybe."
