= Granny Get Your Gun =

- Directed by: George Amy
- Screenplay by: Kenneth Gamet
- Based on: a story by Erle Stanley Gardner
- Produced by: Bryan Foy (uncredited)
- Starring: May Robson; Harry Davenport; Margot Stevenson; Hardie Albright
- Cinematography: L. Wm. O'Connell A.S.C.
- Edited by: Jack Killifer
- Music by: Howard Jackson (uncredited)
- Production company: Warner Bros.–First National Pictures
- Distributed by: Warner Bros. Pictures
- Release date: February 10, 1940
- Running time: 56 minutes
- Country: United States
- Language: English
- Budget: $98,000
- Box office: $256,000

Granny Get Your Gun is a 1940 American comedy Western film directed by George Amy and written by Kenneth Gamet. The film stars May Robson, Harry Davenport, Margot Stevenson and Hardie Albright. It is based primarily on supporting characters found in the 1937 Perry Mason novel The Case of the Dangerous Dowager. The film was released by Warner Bros. Pictures on February 10, 1940.

== Plot ==
Leonard Maltin: "Cute comic mystery... Robson is a hoot as a rough-riding Nevadan who straps on her six-shooters and turns sleuth to clear her granddaughter of a trumped-up murder charge."

== Cast ==
- May Robson as Minerva Hatton
- Harry Davenport as Nate
- Margot Stevenson as Julie Westcott
- Hardie Albright as Phil Westcott
- Clem Bevans as Smokey
- Clay Clement as Riff Daggett
- William Davidson as Fitzgerald
- Arthur Aylesworth as Sheriff Quinn
- Granville Bates as Tom Redding
- Ann Todd as Charlotte
- Vera Lewis as Carrie
- Max Hoffman, Jr. as Frayne
- Archie Twitchell as Joe
- Walter Wilson as Judge
- Nat Carr as Wadsworth

Uncredited (in order of appearance)

| Creighton Hale | second reporter |
| Laird Cregar | court clerk |
| Jack Mower | bailiff |
| Harry Semels | juror |
| George Ovey | Cass |
| Earl Dwire | Jake |
| Dave Willock | young timid driver |

== Reception ==
The film made a profit of $14,000.
