= Jane Bryan =

American actress (1918–2009)

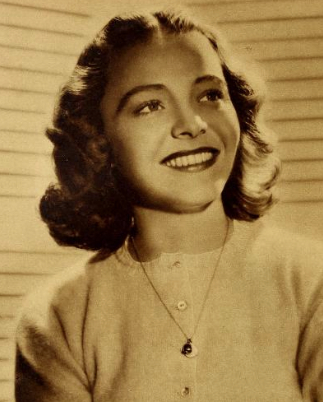
- Bryan, 1940
- Born: Jane O'Brien; June 11, 1918; Hollywood, California, U.S.
- Died: April 8, 2009 (aged 90); Pebble Beach, California, U.S.
- Occupation: Actress
- Years active: 1936–1940
- Spouse: Justin Dart (m. 1939; died 1984)
- Children: 3

Jane Bryan (born Jane O'Brien; June 11, 1918 – April 8, 2009) was an American actress who appeared in Hollywood films throughout the late 1930s. She was groomed by Warner Bros. to become one of its leading ladies, but instead chose to retire from acting in 1940 at age 22, after which she became a philanthropist and arts patron.

== Early years ==
Born in Hollywood, California, Bryan was the daughter of Mr. and Mrs. James O'Brien. Her father was an attorney. Her first dramatic training came in Jean Muir's theatrical workshop, where she was discovered by Bette Davis. Bryan also acted in radio, starring in the two-part episode "Misty Mountain" on the Silver Theater program with Jimmy Stewart on January 22 & 29, 1939.

== Career ==
Bryan gained acting experience as an apprentice at the Hollywood Theatre Workshop. Her film debut came in The Case of the Black Cat (1936).

Her screen career lasted only four years, but she appeared in prominent roles in several memorable films, including Marked Woman (1937) with Davis and Humphrey Bogart; Kid Galahad (1937) with Edward G. Robinson, Davis, and Bogart; A Slight Case of Murder (1938) with Robinson; Each Dawn I Die (1939) with James Cagney and George Raft; Invisible Stripes (1939) with Raft, William Holden, and Bogart; and The Old Maid (1939) with Davis and Miriam Hopkins. Bryan's first leading role was in We Are Not Alone (1939). Associated Press writer Robbin Coons described her work in that film as "a heart-touching performance in which sincerity and truth are radiant factors."

== Marriage ==
Bryan married businessman and entrepreneur Justin Dart on New Year's Eve, 1939. They were married until his death in 1984. Dart took control of the United Drug Company in 1943, and rebranded the stores under the Rexall Drug name.

The Darts were staunch Republicans and helped persuade their personal friend, former California governor Ronald Reagan, to run for president of the United States in 1980.

== Public service ==
Bryan served on the United States Commission of Fine Arts in Washington, D.C. from 1971 to 1976.

== Death ==
Jane Bryan Dart died at her home on April 8, 2009, aged 90, in Pebble Beach, California, following a lengthy illness. She was survived by her three children; three grandchildren; two great-grandchildren; and two brothers.

== Filmography ==
Year	Title	Role	Notes
1936	The Case of the Black Cat	Wilma Laxter	
1936	The Captain's Kid	Betsy Ann Prentiss	
1937	Under Southern Stars	Arlene	Short
1937	Marked Woman	Betty Strauber	
1937	The Cherokee Strip	Janie Walton	
1937	Kid Galahad	Marie Donati	
1937	Confession	Lisa Koslov	
1938	A Slight Case of Murder	Mary Marco	
1938	The Sisters	Grace Elliott	
1938	Girls on Probation	Connie Heath	
1938	Brother Rat	Kate Rice	
1939	The Man Who Dared	Marge Carter	
1939	Each Dawn I Die	Joyce	
1939	The Old Maid	Tina	
1939	These Glamour Girls	Carol Christy	
1939	We Are Not Alone	Leni Krafft	
1939	Invisible Stripes	Peggy	
1940	Brother Rat and a Baby	Kate	(final film role)
