= Margot Stevenson =

American actress (1912–2011)

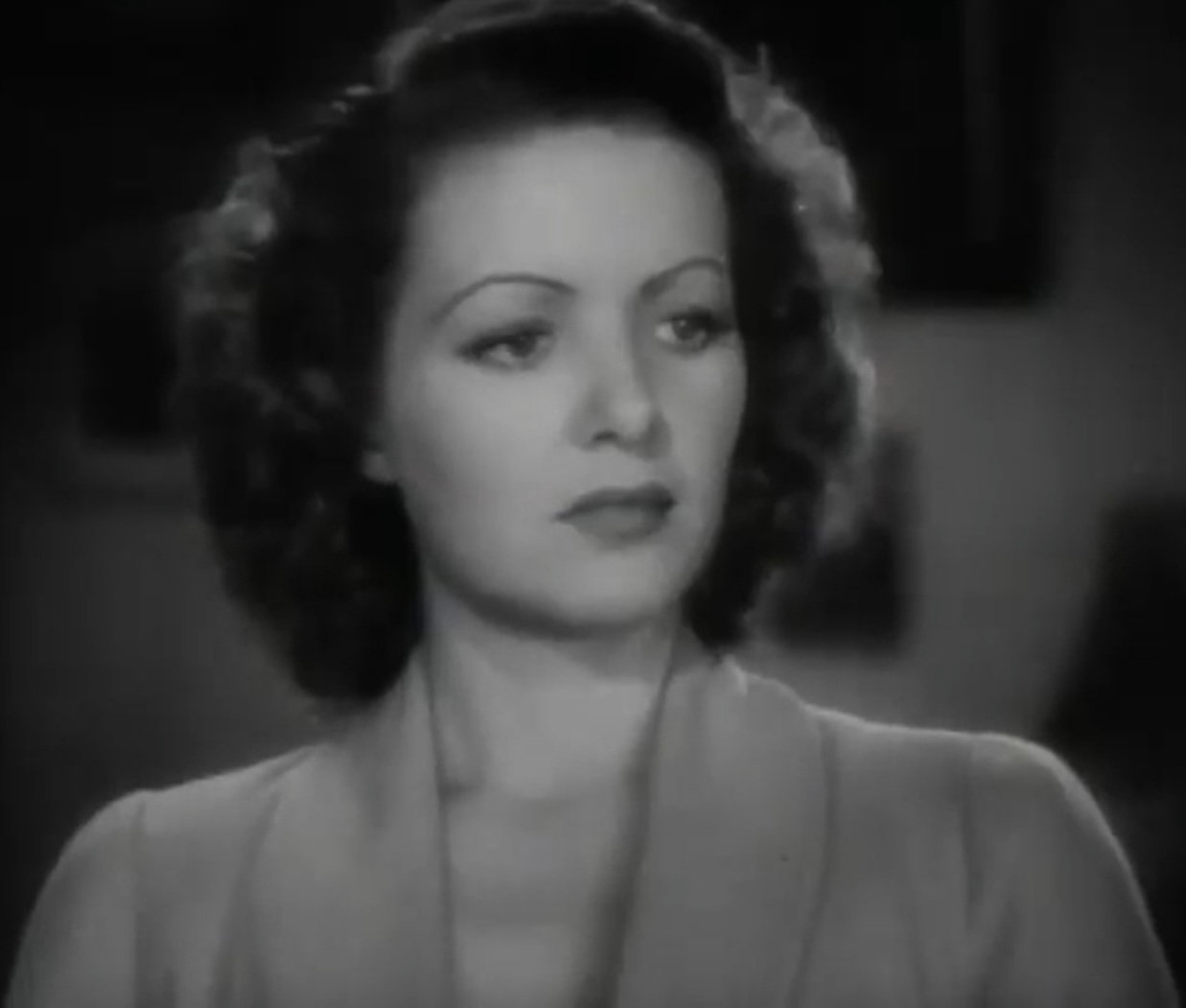
- Stevenson in the trailer for Calling Philo Vance (1940)
- Born: Margaret Helen Stevenson; February 8, 1912; New York City, U.S.
- Died: January 2, 2011 (aged 98); New York City, U.S.
- Occupation: Actress
- Years active: 1934–1983
- Spouses: Robert Russell (m. 1943; div. 19??); Val Avery (m. 1953; died 2009)
- Children: 1

Margaret Helen Stevenson (February 8, 1912 – January 2, 2011) was an American film, stage, and radio actress, known for her role as Margo Lane in the radio adaptation of The Shadow, opposite Orson Welles in 1938.

== Early life ==
Stevenson was born in Manhattan on February 8, 1912, the daughter of Irish-born actor Charles Alexander Stevenson, who was 60 years old when she was born, and his second wife Frances Riley, who was 22 years old at the time. She graduated from Brearley School in Manhattan. Stevenson was about to enroll at Bryn Mawr College in Pennsylvania, when the Great Depression began. She decided to pursue acting to earn an income instead of attending Bryn Mawr.

== Career ==
Stevenson made her Broadway debut in The Firebird in 1932. Her other Broadway credits included The Royal Family (1975), Hostile Witness (1966), One by One (1964), Big Fish, Little Fish (1961), Triple Play (1959), The Young and Beautiful (1955), The Leading Lady (1948), The Rugged Path (1945), Little Women (1944), Golden Wings (1941), You Can't Take It With You (1936), Stage Door (1936), Call It a Day (1936), Truly Valiant (1936), Symphony (1935), The Barretts of Wimpole Street (1935), A Party (1933), and Evensong (1933). She also acted in a West End production of The Seven Year Itch in London in the 1950s in addition to performing frequently in summer stock theatre and regional theater in the United States.

In addition to her work on The Shadow, Stevenson acted on Aunt Jenny's Real Life Stories on old-time radio. She also acted on television and for more than a decade did TV commercials.

== Personal life ==
Her second husband, Val Avery, whom she married in 1953, died on December 12, 2009, at age 85.

By the late 1990s, Stevenson was blind as a result of macular degeneration. She died at her home in Manhattan on January 2, 2011, at the age of 98.

== Filmography ==
=== Film ===
Year	Title	Role	Notes
1934	Come to Dinner	Miss Jurgen - Oliver's Daughter	Short film
1939	Smashing the Money Ring	Peggy	
1939	Invisible Stripes	Sue	
1940	Calling Philo Vance	Hilda Lake	
1940	Granny Get Your Gun	Julie Westcott	
1940	Castle on the Hudson	Ann Rockford	
1940	Saturday's Children	Mrs. MacReady (voice)	Uncredited
1940	Flight Angels	Rita	
1967	Valley of the Dolls	Anne's Mother	Uncredited
1968	The Brotherhood		Uncredited
1970	Rabbit, Run	Mrs. Tothero	
1979	Going in Style	Store Cashier	

=== Television ===
Year	Title	Role	Notes
1954	Douglas Fairbanks Presents	Myra	Episode: "Myra and the Moneyman"
1954	Macbeth	Lady Macduff	Television film
1954–1955	The Philco Television Playhouse	Mary Venner	2 episodes
1965	Voyage to the Bottom of the Sea	Betty	Episode: "Escape from Venice"
1983	How to Be a Perfect Person in Just Three Days	Old Lady	Television film
