= The Cherokee Strip =

1937 film by Noel M. Smith

- Theatrical release poster
- Directed by: Noel M. Smith
- Screenplay by: Luci Ward; Joseph K. Watson
- Produced by: Bryan Foy
- Starring: Dick Foran; Jane Bryan; Robert Paige; Joan Valerie; Edmund Cobb; Joseph Crehan
- Cinematography: L. William O'Connell
- Edited by: Thomas Pratt
- Music by: Howard Jackson
- Production company: Warner Bros. Pictures
- Distributed by: Warner Bros. Pictures
- Release date: May 15, 1937
- Running time: 55 minutes
- Country: United States
- Language: English

The Cherokee Strip is a 1937 American Western film directed by Noel M. Smith and written by Luci Ward and Joseph K. Watson. The film stars Dick Foran, Jane Bryan, Robert Paige, Joan Valerie, Edmund Cobb and Joseph Crehan. The film was released by Warner Bros. Pictures on May 15, 1937.

== Cast ==
- Dick Foran as Dick Hudson
- Jane Bryan as Janie Walton
- Robert Paige as Tom Valley
- Joan Valerie as Ruth Valley
- Edmund Cobb as Link Carter
- Joseph Crehan as Army Officer
- Milton Kibbee as Blade Simpson
- Gordon Hart as Judge Ben Parkinson
- Frank Faylen as Joe Brady
- Jack Mower as Bill Tidewell
- Tom Brower as George Walton
- Walter Soderling as Mink Abbott
- Tommy Bupp as Barty Walton
