= Dust Be My Destiny =

1939 American drama film

- Directed by: Lewis Seiler
- Screenplay by: Robert Rossen; Seton I. Miller (uncredited)
- Based on: Dust Be My Destiny by Jerome Odlum
- Produced by: Hal B. Wallis (exec. producer); Louis F. Edelman (assoc. producer)
- Starring: John Garfield; Priscilla Lane; Alan Hale
- Cinematography: James Wong Howe
- Edited by: Warren Low
- Music by: Max Steiner
- Distributed by: Warner Bros. Pictures
- Release date: September 16, 1939
- Running time: 88 minutes
- Country: United States
- Language: English

Dust Be My Destiny is a 1939 American drama film starring John Garfield as a man who gets into trouble after being sentenced to a work farm.

== Plot ==
Joe Bell becomes embittered after he is jailed for 16 months for a burglary he did not commit. Later, while riding in a boxcar with two brothers, he gets into a fight with a robber and is sentenced to a work farm for 90 days. There, he becomes friends with Mabel Alden, which displeases Charles Garreth, her stepfather and the farm's foreman. The two men fight, and Joe knocks Garreth out. Panicking, the young couple flee and get married, only to learn that Garreth has died and that Joe is wanted for his murder. The two then flee over the state line. Unaware that Joe has been charged with Garreth's death they agree to a stage show marriage complete with a house rent free for the first month and fully furnished. Before they can collect the prize they hear on the radio about the manhunt for Joe and flee the theater. They go to another town and eat a meal from Nick who takes pity on them and gives them a job in his restaurant. Seemingly doing well they are not aware that the local police who frequent the restaurant have gotten suspicious of them. Joe gets away but Mabel is arrested. Joe with Nick's help stages a jailbreak and frees Mabel.

Constantly on the move to avoid capture, Joe finally gets a break. He is in the right spot to take pictures of a bank robbery in progress. He uses them to get a job as a photographer at a newspaper run by Mike Leonard. When the leader of the outfit tries to get the negatives, Joe saves Mike's life. Unfortunately, his own picture is put on the front page of various newspapers as a result. Joe tries to flee once more, but Mabel turns him in to the police, convinced that running away is the wrong thing to do.

At the trial, despite a parade of character witnesses in Joe's favor, the prosecutor seems to have the upper hand. Defense attorney Slim Jones calls Mabel to the stand. She convinces the jury to declare her husband innocent.

== Cast ==
- John Garfield as Joe Bell
- Priscilla Lane as Mabel Alden
- Alan Hale, Sr. as Mike Leonard
- Frank McHugh as Caruthers
- Billy Halop as Hank Glenn
- Bobby Jordan as Jimmy Glenn
- Charley Grapewin as Pop
- Henry Armetta as Nick Spelucci
- Stanley Ridges as Charles Garreth
- John Litel as the Prosecutor
- Moroni Olsen as Slim Jones

== Reception ==
Boxoffice wrote that the film was "an adroitly wrought screenplay provides a welcome mitigation of the theme's austerity through the injection of a vein of comedy and romance without detracting one whit from the strength of the feature, which is entertainment from start to finish and for all ages and classes... John Garfield was never better than in the part of a homeless youngster struggling against almost insurmountable odds for his place in the sun, while his performance is challenged all the way in an equally splendid portrayal by Priscilla Lane... Masterfully directed by Lewis Seiler".

Variety reviewed, "Although story is overlong and episodic, these deficiencies are partially overcome by excellent performances of Garfield and Miss Lane. Garfield has a role particularly tailored to general typing of recent film portrayals, and which will enhance his popularity. Miss Lane is competently sincere throughout, with several dramatic scenes rising far above the material provided... Yarn is slow in generating interest, and rather static in several spots, but there are other dramatic high spots to make it acceptable on the whole".

The Los Angeles Times wrote, "John Garfield and Priscilla Lane, who truly go to town with their acting together, have the leads. Their courtroom scenes are eminently fine, and moving... The picture is not satisfactory at the outset, but reaches an excellent climax".

Mae Tinee of the Chicago Daily Tribune wrote, "In many places it is sincere, workmanlike and credible production. At other times it's just ten, twent' thirt'--and ham. But the leads are so likable and some of the suspense so suspenseful that I think you'll chalk up Dust Be My Destiny as satisfactory entertainment".

Frank S. Nugent of the New York Times reviewed it as the "latest of the [Warner] Brothers' apparently interminable line of melodramas about the fate-dogged boys from the wrong side of the railroad tracks. Considering the practice they have had, it's not at all surprising that the picture goes its way smoothly, never missing a dramatic cue, a pause for laughter, a perfectly timed spurt of action when the utter futility of it all begins to grow too utterly utter If that's the measure of success, the Warners can chalk up another. Personally, we're tired of the formula. It's not even fun, any more, outguessing the script".
