= Rosalind Marquis =

American actress

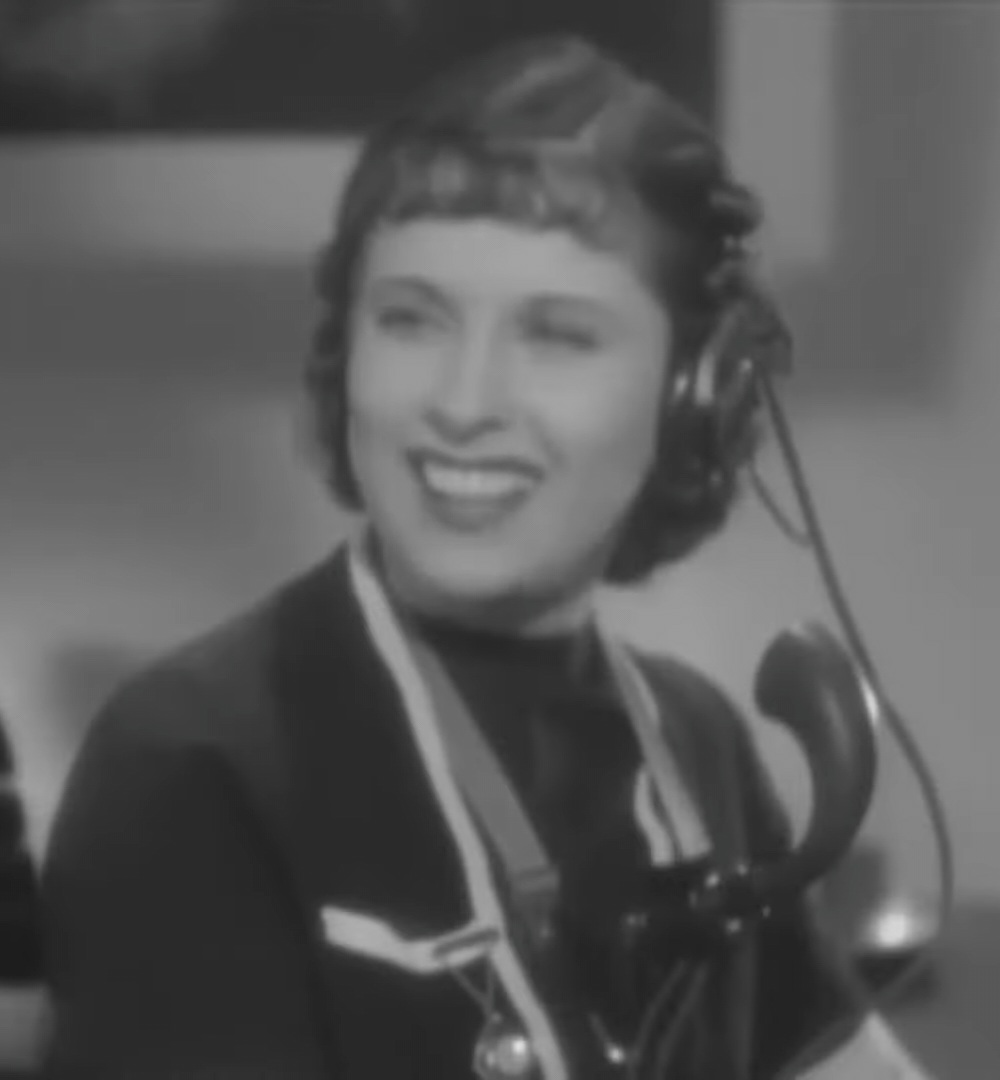
- Marquis in Earthworm Tractors (1936)
- Born: September 15, 1917; Chicago, Illinois, U.S.
- Died: June 12, 2006 (aged 88); Naples, Florida, U.S.
- Occupation: Actress
- Years active: 1936–1938
- Spouses: William L Waller (m. 1936; div. 1937): Edwin Diamond Axton II; Thomas E. Saxe Jr
- Children: 3

Rosalind Marquis (September 11, 1915 – June 12, 2006) was an American actress.

== Early life and career ==
She was born Rosalind Saindon on 11 September 1915 in Chicago. She was the sixth of eight children of Leopold Saindon, an usher of modest means, and Cora Vadeboncoeur. She was educated there at St. Patrick's Academy, before winning a beauty contest at the 1933-34 Century of Progress also in Chicago. She was always a talented singer and moved to New York City, where she worked extensively in theatre, before moving to Hollywood. However, Warner Bros. studios mismanaged her career, and despite three lead roles she never succeeded as an actress. In 1938, aged 23, she returned full-time to her singing career. While working as a backing vocalist for Edith Piaf on a US tour, she met her second husband, Ed Axton, and gave up the stage permanently.

== Partial filmography ==
- Gold Diggers of 1937 (1936)
- Echo Mountain (1936)
- Marked Woman (1937) as Florrie Liggett
- Talent Scout (1937)

== Personal life ==
She had three marriages, to William L Waller (25 May 1936 - 1937, divorced), Edwin Diamond Axton II (divorced) and Thomas E. Saxe Jr (until his death). She had three children with Ed Axton.

Marquis died on 12 June 2006 in Naples, Florida.
