= Smashing the Money Ring =

1939 film by Terry O. Morse

- Theatrical release poster
- Directed by: Terry O. Morse
- Screenplay by: Anthony Coldeway; Raymond L. Schrock
- Produced by: Bryan Foy
- Starring: Ronald Reagan; Margot Stevenson; Eddie Foy, Jr. Joe Downing; Charles D. Brown; Joe King
- Cinematography: James Van Trees
- Edited by: Frank Magee
- Music by: Bernhard Kaun
- Production company: First National Pictures
- Distributed by: Warner Bros. Pictures
- Release date: October 21, 1939
- Running time: 57 minutes
- Country: United States
- Language: English

Smashing the Money Ring is a 1939 American adventure film directed by Terry O. Morse, written by Anthony Coldeway and Raymond L. Schrock, and starring Ronald Reagan, Margot Stevenson, Eddie Foy, Jr., Joe Downing, Charles D. Brown and Joe King. It was released by Warner Bros. Pictures on October 21, 1939.

== Plot ==
A counterfeit money ring is being run from prison by a gangster, Dice Matthews, and a casino owner, Steve Parker, who is behind bars for slugging a cop. U.S. Secret Service agent Brass Bancroft goes undercover as a convict, getting help on the outside from his right-hand man, Gabby, while infiltrating the counterfeiting ring.

Parker's daughter, Peggy, becomes involved, identifying a guard who's also in on the scheme after her father is murdered. Bancroft and Matthews make a break for it, but although the guard shoots both, Bancroft recovers and sees that justice is done.

== Cast ==
- Ronald Reagan as Lt. Brass Bancroft
- Margot Stevenson as Peggy
- Eddie Foy, Jr. as Gabby
- Joe Downing as Dice Mathews
- Charles D. Brown as Parker
- Joe King as Saxby
- William B. Davidson as Warden Denby
- Charles C. Wilson as Capt. Kilrane
- Elliott Sullivan as Danny Galloway
- John Hamilton as Night Captain
- Sidney Bracey as Pop Dryden
- Jack Wise as Prison Runner
- Jack Mower as First Night Guard
- Don Turner as Joe
