= Marked Woman =

1937 film directed by Lloyd Bacon

- 1937 rerelease theatrical poster
- Directed by: Lloyd Bacon; Michael Curtiz (uncredited)
- Written by: Robert Rossen; Abem Finkel; Seton I. Miller (uncredited)
- Starring: Bette Davis; Humphrey Bogart
- Cinematography: George Barnes
- Edited by: Jack Killifer
- Music by: Score: Bernhard Kaun; Heinz Roemheld; David Raksin (all uncredited); Songs: Harry Warren; Al Dubin
- Production company: Warner Bros. Pictures
- Distributed by: Warner Bros. Pictures
- Release date: April 10, 1937
- Running time: 84 minutes
- Country: United States
- Language: English

Marked Woman is a 1937 American crime drama film directed by Lloyd Bacon and starring Bette Davis and Humphrey Bogart, with featured performances by Lola Lane, Isabel Jewell, Rosalind Marquis, Mayo Methot, Jane Bryan, Eduardo Ciannelli and Allen Jenkins. Set in the underworld of Manhattan, Marked Woman tells the story of a woman who dares to stand up to one of the city's most powerful gangsters.

The film was a major success for Warner Bros. Pictures and one of Davis' most important early pictures. She had recently filed a lawsuit against the studio, partly because of the inferior quality of roles that she was expected to play. Although she lost the lawsuit, she garnered considerable press coverage, and Marked Woman was her first film upon returning to Hollywood. She was reported to be pleased with the script and the dramatic possibilities that it afforded her. Jack L. Warner was said to be equally pleased by the public's reaction in favor of Davis, which he predicted would increase the appeal and profitability of her films.

Costars Humphrey Bogart and Mayo Methot met on the set of Marked Woman and were married in 1938.

== Plot ==
The notorious underworld czar Johnny Vanning becomes the owner of a gaudy New York night club and renames it Club Intimate. He exploits and mistreats the club's bar girls—Mary, Gabby, Emmy Lou, Florrie, and Estelle—in order to ensure their loyalty and obedience. As part of her job, Mary entices a man into betting and losing more money than he can afford. On the way home, he confides in her that he does not have the money to repay the gambling debt. He feels that it is all a game, but Mary warns him that he is in real danger and must leave town immediately. She is distressed, but not surprised, to learn soon after that the man has been murdered by two of Vanning's henchmen. District Attorney David Graham brings Vanning to trial, feeling that he has a strong case. Mary testifies against them, but Vanning has an airtight alibi concocted for them, and further damages her reputation, so the jury rules they were innocent. Graham believes that Mary lied to him, and she leaves fearing Vanning's retribution.

Mary's younger sister Betty visits for a football game. Unaware of the dangerous situation that she has entered, Betty attends a party at Vanning's club with Mary's roommate Emmy Lou. She meets Vanning's friend Bob Crandall, and after dancing with him, returns to the women's apartment. Mary admonishes her not to go back to the party, but Betty does it anyway. At the party Betty meets Crandall again, and he tries to get her to go with him. She resists, but Vanning is enraged and slaps her, causing her to tumble down a flight of stairs to her death. Vanning disposes of her corpse in the river.

Mary is panicked that Betty hasn't returned from the party, and threatens to testify against Vanning, but his thugs beat her and scar her face, cutting a cross onto her cheek. Her resolve to testify against Vanning is only strengthened. Aware that they can only be free from Vanning if they stand against him, the other women also agree to testify. They implicate Vanning, breaking up his vice ring. As Graham is congratulated by the press, the five girls walk off into the foggy night.

== Cast ==
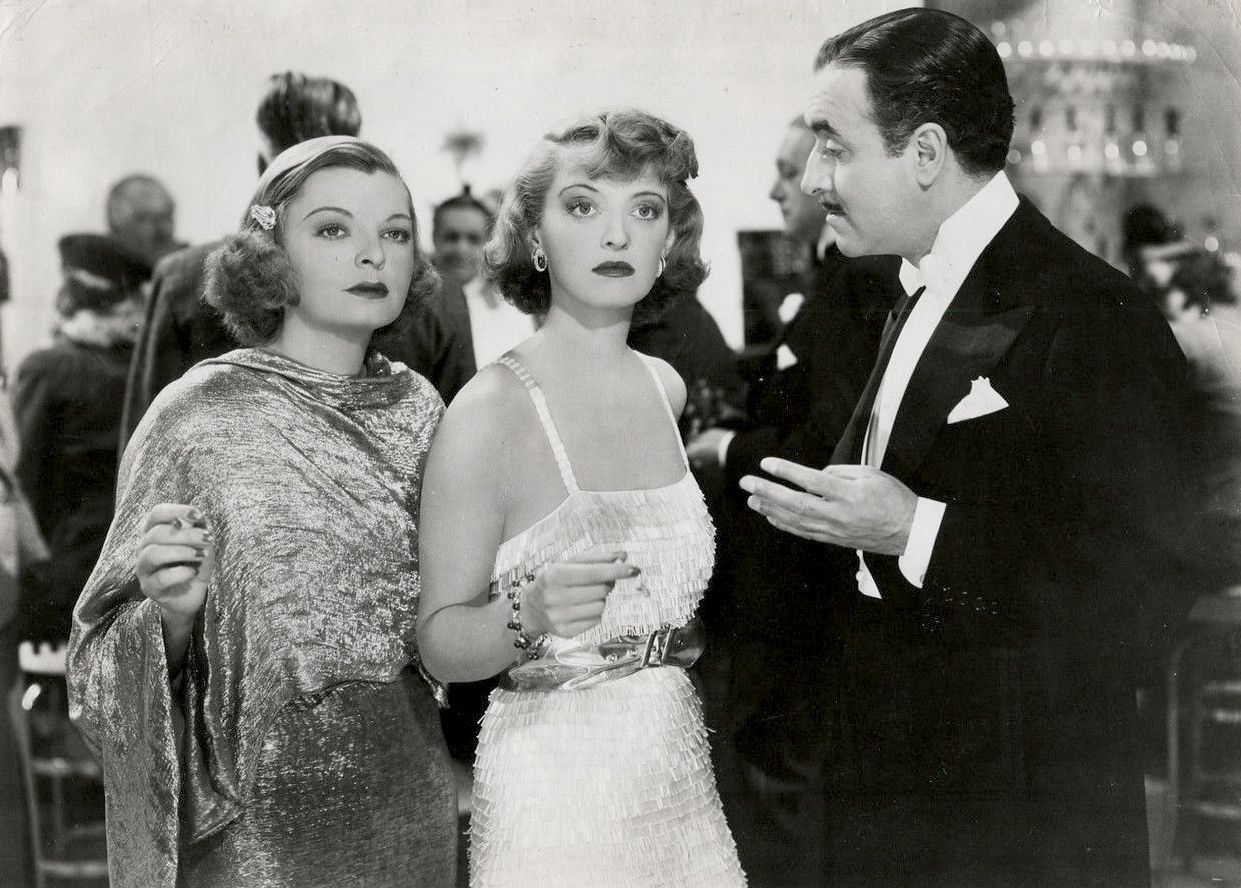
Mayo Methot and Bette Davis

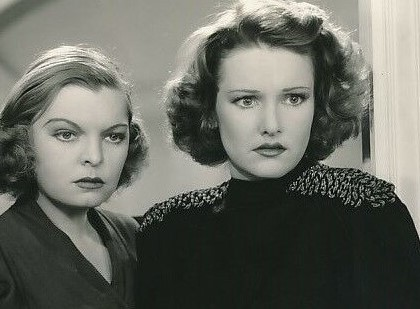
Mayo Methot and Lola Lane

- Bette Davis as Mary Dwight/Mary Strauber
- Humphrey Bogart as District Attorney David Graham
- Lola Lane as Dorothy "Gabby" Marvin
- Isabel Jewell as Emmy Lou Eagan
- Eduardo Ciannelli as Johnny Vanning
- Rosalind Marquis as Florrie Liggett
- Mayo Methot as Estelle Porter
- Jane Bryan as Betty Strauber
- Allen Jenkins as Louie
- John Litel as Gordon, Vanning's lawyer
- Ben Welden as Charlie Delaney
- Damian O'Flynn as Ralph Krawford
- Henry O'Neill as District Attorney Arthur Sheldon
- Raymond Hatton as Vanning's Lawyer
- Carlos San Martín as Head Waiter
- William B. Davidson as Bob Crandall
- Kenneth Harlan as Eddie, a Sugar Daddy
- Robert Strange as George Beler
- Archie Robbins as Bell Captain (credited as James Robbins)
- Arthur Ayelsworth as Sheriff John Truble
- John Sheehan as Vincent
- Sam Wren as Mac
- Edwin Stanley as Detective Casey (credited as playing "Ferguson")

Uncredited cast

- Alan Davis as Henchman
- Allen Mathews as Henchman
- Guy Usher as Detective Ferguson
- Gordon Hart as Judge at 1st trial
- Pierre Watkin as Judge at 2nd trial
- Herman Marks as Joe
- Ralph Dunn as Court Clerk at 1st trial

Cast notes

- Eduardo Ciannelli bears a physical resemblance to Lucky Luciano.
- Hymie Marks, who played the bit part of a gangster named Joe in the film, attracted the attention of executive producer Hal B. Wallis, who felt that he did not look menacing enough, despite the fact that Marks was a former gangster and henchman of Lucky Luciano and had been specifically cast by director Lloyd Bacon because of this connection.
- Warner Bros. had originally cast Jane Wyman as Florrie.

== Background ==
Despite a disclaimer at the start of the film that asserts that the story is fictitious, Marked Woman is loosely based on the real-life crime-fighting exploits of Thomas E. Dewey, a Manhattan district attorney who became a national celebrity in the 1930s because of his fight against organized crime in New York City. Dewey indicted and convicted several prominent gangsters, and his greatest achievement was the conviction of Lucky Luciano, the organized crime boss of the entire city. Dewey used the testimony of numerous call girls and madams to convict Luciano of running one of the largest prostitution rings in American history. Hollywood studios produced several films about Dewey's exploits, with Marked Woman among the most prominent. Humphrey Bogart's character David Graham is based on Dewey, who went on to twice become the Republican presidential nominee in the 1940s.

Warner Bros. purchased the rights from a Liberty series on Luciano but was forced to make alterations to the story because of censorship concerns, such as changing the women's profession from that of prostitute to nightclub hostess.

== Production ==
Because the Motion Picture Production Code prohibited plots involving brothels or prostitution, the prostitutes in the original Liberty series were changed to nightclub hostesses in the screenplay. Vanning's racket became illegal gambling rather than running a prostitution ring, and the crime became a murder.

Marked Woman entered production on December 9, 1936 at the Warner Bros. studios in Burbank under the working title The Men Behind. Director Michael Curtiz substituted for Lloyd Bacon while Bacon was on his honeymoon.

Bette Davis was unhappy with the minimal bandaging that had been used for her hospital-room scene, so on her lunch break she drove to her personal doctor, described the injuries from the script and asked him to bandage her accordingly. When she returned to the studio, a guard at the gate saw her bandages and called executive producer Hal B. Wallis to tell him that Davis had been in an accident.

Warner Bros. rereleased Marked Woman in 1947.

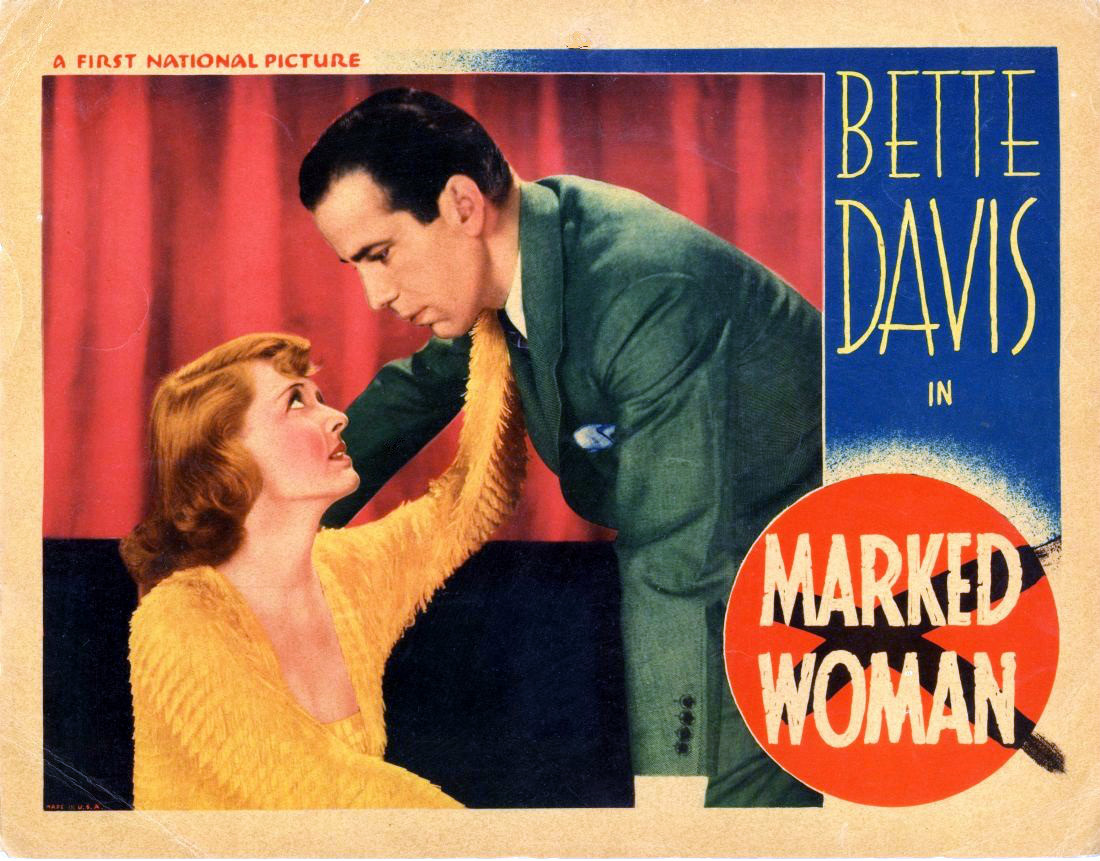
Bette Davis and Humphrey Bogart

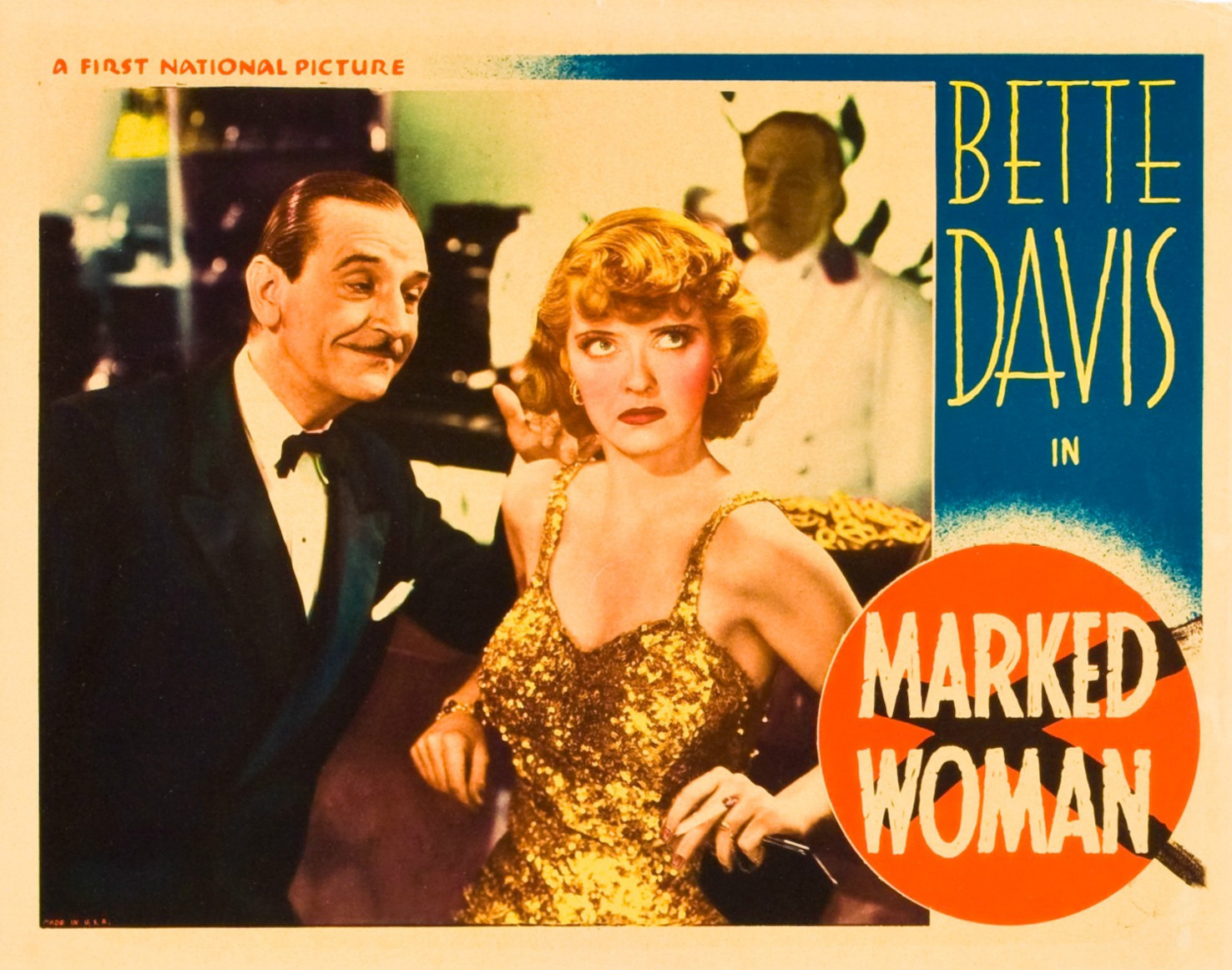
Lobby card

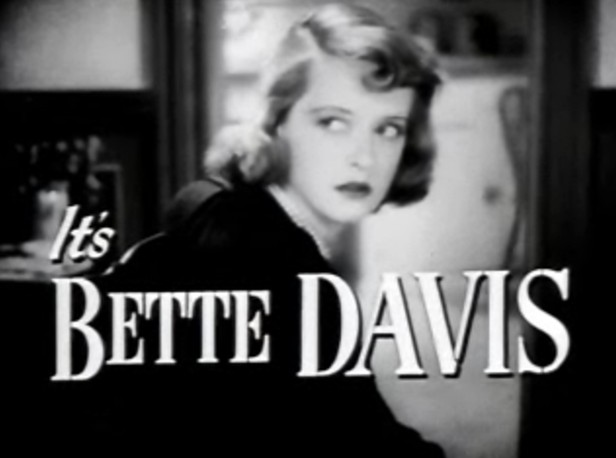
From the trailer

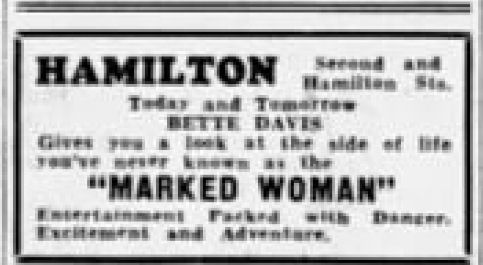
Theater advertisement

== Reception ==
Writing for Night and Day magazine in 1937, Graham Greene offered a positive review, noting that as a noir film "it's been done before, of course, [...] but it has never been done better than in some of these scenes." Greene praised Ciannelli, who was able to "convey not only corruption but the sadness of corruption," but Greene expressed disappointment with Davis' acting, which he claimed "plugs the emotions with dreadful abandonment."

While Greene's assessment was unfavorable, contemporary American critics largely praised Davis's performance upon the film's release. Variety wrote that her acting was "rife with subtleties of expression and gesture," commending her willingness to appear unglamorous and heavily bandaged in the hospital scenes without vanity. Reviewing the film for The New York Times, Frank S. Nugent welcomed Davis's return to the screen following her legal dispute with Warner Bros., noting that the studio had provided her with "a dramatically concise script, a shrewd director and an extremely capable supporting cast." Her portrayal was also recognized internationally, earning her the Volpi Cup for Best Actress at the 5th Venice International Film Festival later that year.

In retrospective and modern assessments, critics have praised the film's gritty realism, brisk pacing, and focus on female solidarity. Writing for Time Out, critics commended the film's unsentimental approach to its subject matter, noting that it depicts its working-class characters as "the unsung heroines of a cruel economic and social trap." Reviewing the picture for Films in Review in 2026, John Larkin highlighted its sharp focus on sisterhood and institutional failure, writing that the film's enduring power lies in its depiction of "women pushed into a corner by men who assume they have no leverage and no voice." Similarly, the Chicago Tribune praised the film's tense courtroom climax and dramatic impact, observing that its raw depiction of urban corruption continues to resonate beyond standard studio melodramas of the era.

The film is ranked on review aggregator website Rotten Tomatoes at 100% based on reviews by five critics and with an average ranking of 6.5/10.

=== Awards and honors ===
Bette Davis won the Venice Film Festival's Volpi Cup for Best Actress in 1937. Director Lloyd Bacon was nominated for the 1937 Mussolini Cup.
