= Jerome Odlum =

American writer and screenwriter (1905–1954)

Jerome Odlum (August 6, 1905 – March 2, 1954) was an American writer.

Odlum was born in Minneapolis, Minnesota.

He served a term in prison for forgery. After his time in prison, he became a reporter and then managing editor of The Minneapolis News.

Odlum was married in Minneapolis in 1937. His wife filed for divorce in 1939.

He published a novel, Each Dawn I Die, in 1938. It was adapted to a film of the same name in 1939. Odlum then became a screenwriter. He was under contract to Paramount at $2,500 per month in 1939. He wrote several more novels as well as film screenplays.

In 1952, it was reported that he would be writing for television.

Jerome Odlum died of a stroke on March 2, 1954.

== Works ==
=== Books ===
- Each Dawn I Die. Indianapolis; New York: Bobbs-Merrill Co., 1938.
- Nine Lives Are Not Enough. New York: Sheridan House, 1940.
- Lady Sourdough. New York: Macmillan Co, 1941. By Frances Ella Fitz; as told to Jerome Odlum.
- Night and No Moon. New York: Howell, Soskin, 1942.
- The Morgue Is Always Open. New York: Charles Scribner's Sons, 1944.
- The Mirabilis Diamond. New York: Charles Scribner's Sons, 1945.
- Private Detective. Sydney: Invincible Press, 194-?

=== Films ===
- The Oklahoma Kid (uncredited) (1939)
- Each Dawn I Die (from the novel by) (1939)
- Dust Be My Destiny (novel) (1939)
- Nine Lives Are Not Enough (from the novel by) (1941)
- I Was Framed (idea) (1942)
- Crime Doctor (adaptation) (1943)
- A Scream in the Dark (novel "The Morgue is Always Open") (1943)
- Marine Raiders (contributor to screenplay construction – uncredited) (1944)
- Strange Affair (screenplay) (1944)
- In Old Sacramento (original story) (1946)
- Last Frontier Uprising (story) (1947)
- Cover Up (original screenplay) (1949)
- Song of India (story) (1949)
- Never Trust a Gambler (screenplay) / (story) (1951)
- Highway Dragnet (screenplay) (1954)
- The Fast and the Furious (screenplay) (1954)
- The Strange Affair (uncredited) (1968)

=== Television ===
- Lux Video Theatre (TV Series) (1 episode: Cover-Up (original screenplay) (1955)
