= In Old Sacramento =

1946 film

- Theatrical release poster
- Directed by: Joseph Kane
- Screenplay by: Frances Hyland; Frank Gruber
- Story by: Jerome Odlum
- Produced by: Joseph Kane
- Starring: Wild Bill Elliott; Constance Moore; Henry H. Daniels Jr. Ruth Donnelly; Eugene Pallette; Jack La Rue
- Cinematography: Jack A. Marta
- Edited by: Fred Allen
- Music by: Charles Maxwell
- Production company: Republic Pictures
- Distributed by: Republic Pictures
- Release date: May 31, 1946
- Running time: 89 minutes
- Country: United States
- Language: English

In Old Sacramento is a 1946 American Western film directed by Joseph Kane and written by Frances Hyland and Frank Gruber. The film stars Wild Bill Elliott, Constance Moore, Henry H. Daniels Jr., Ruth Donnelly, Eugene Pallette and Jack La Rue.

== Cast ==
- Wild Bill Elliott as Johnny Barrett / Spanish Jack
- Constance Moore as Belle Malone
- Henry H. Daniels Jr. as Sam Chase
- Ruth Donnelly as Zebby Booker
- Eugene Pallette as Sheriff Jim Wales
- Jack La Rue as Laramie
- Grant Withers as Captain Mark Slayter
- Charles Judels as Tony Marchetti
- Paul Hurst as Stagecoach Driver
- Lionel Stander as Eddie Dodge
- Robert Blake as Newsboy
- Dick Wessel as Oscar
- Ellen Hansen Corby as Scrubwoman (uncredited)

== Release ==
The film was released on May 31, 1946, by Republic Pictures. It premiered at the Capitol and Hippodrome theaters in Sacramento, California. The film was re-edited and released in 1951 as Flame of Sacramento.
