= A Slight Case of Murder =

1938 film by Lloyd Bacon

- Theatrical release poster
- Directed by: Lloyd Bacon
- Written by: Earl Baldwin; Joseph Schrank
- Based on: A Slight Case of Murder; 1935 play by Damon Runyon and Howard Lindsay
- Produced by: Samuel Bischoff
- Starring: Edward G. Robinson; Jane Bryan; Allen Jenkins; Ruth Donnelly
- Cinematography: Sidney Hickox
- Edited by: James Gibbon
- Music by: Heinz Roemheld (uncredited)
- Distributed by: Warner Bros. Pictures
- Release date: February 26, 1938
- Running time: 85 minutes
- Language: English

A Slight Case of Murder is a 1938 American black comedy film directed by Lloyd Bacon and starring Edward G. Robinson. The film is based on the 1935 play by Damon Runyon and Howard Lindsay.

== Plot ==
With the end of Prohibition, bootlegger Remy Marco (shown as "Marko" in one sequence) becomes a legitimate brewer, but he slowly goes broke because the beer that he makes tastes terrible, and everyone is afraid to tell him so. After four years, with bank officers preparing to foreclose on the brewery, he retreats to his Saratoga summer home with his daughter Mary coming home from school. Remy also takes along an orphan from his old stomping grounds, only to find four dead mobsters who had planned to ambush him but were killed by another gang member, who lurks around the residence.

Marco's henchmen distribute the dead bodies in various places in the area as a gag, but when they learn that there is a substantial reward for the gang, dead or alive, they scramble to retrieve the dead men and hide the bodies in a closet in Marco's home. After the gangsters' loot is discovered under a bed, Marco plans to use it to pay the bankers. He presents it to the bankers, who tell him that they will extend his credit. Then, he calls the police while arranging for his daughter's fiancé Dick Whitewood, a state trooper, to shoot his gun through the closet door repeatedly in order to trick the authorities into thinking that Whitewood has singlehandedly nabbed and killed the gang. As it turns out, one of Whitewood's shots hits the fifth gang member on the roof, whereupon he crashes into the incoming policemen to the surprise of Marco.

== Cast ==
Actor	Role
Edward G. Robinson	Remy Marco
Jane Bryan	Mary Marco
Allen Jenkins	Mike
Ruth Donnelly	Nora Marco
Willard Parker	Dick Whitewood
John Litel	Mr. Post, banker
Edward Brophy	Lefty
Harold Huber	Giuseppe 'Gip' ("Guiseppe" in the film credits)
Eric Stanley	Mr. Ritter, banker
Paul Harvey	Mr. Whitewood
Margaret Hamilton	Mrs. Cagle
Bobby Jordan	Douglas Fairbanks Rosenbloom

== Reception ==
In a contemporary review for The New York Times, critic Frank S. Nugent called A Slight Case of Murder "just about the funniest show the new year has produced" and wrote: "It goes after its laughs with Rabelaisian gusto, a dialogic scorn of the grammatical properties and an impolite subscription to the dictum: de mortuis nil nisi mayhem. ... If you're not too squeamish, you should have a round of chuckles on the house."

Los Angeles Times reviewer Edwin Schallert wrote: "It is one of the most laughable and clever productions of the type, providing Edward G. Robinson with the best part that he has had in several recent films. Most amusing are the results aimed at and secured in the screen play, direction and acting, all of which seem to be at a peak." Turner Classic Movies quoted contemporary reviews: "Audiences and critics loved it. "One of the funniest and most satisfying farces [to] come out of Hollywood in some time," said the New York Herald-Tribune. Variety called it "a mirthful and hilarious whimsy. Takes the one-time big gangster audience for a box-office ride in reverse gear. Lloyd Bacon directs with a fine sense of humor and a swift pace." "

Pauline Kael called it “A black farce in the manner of Arsenic and Old Lace. It's a burlesque of gangster films, with Edward G. Robinson as a bootlegger who turns legitimate and faces one mortifying mess after another ... the tone of the film is archly childish.” Leonard Maltin awarded it three and a half out of four stars, writing, “Robinson's in peak comedy form as gangster who goes straight when Prohibition ends.” Leslie Halliwell, who rarely gives more than two stars, gave it three of four stars, simply stating, "Amusing black farce ... "

== Adaptations ==
The story was remade as Stop, You're Killing Me (1952) with Broderick Crawford and Claire Trevor.

On April 8, 1945, Old Gold Comedy Theatre presented a 30-minute adaptation of the story on NBC Radio, starring Edward G. Robinson and Allen Jenkins. On January 24, 1954, it was presented on NBC Star Playhouse, again starring Robinson.

== See also ==
- List of American films of 1938
