= St. Patrick's Academy =

Defunct private school in Chicago, USA

St. Patrick's Academy was a Catholic grammar school that was located in Chicago, Illinois. It was founded in 1883 by the Sisters of Mercy.

St. Patrick's was located on the northwest corner of Oakley Avenue and Washington Boulevard. The school was across the street from St. Malachy's parish school. The school closed in 1969. It served a small group of children (about 120, in eight grades and kindergarten) from all over Chicago with heavy representation from the Italian, Irish and Polish communities. Class sizes were small and two grades often occupied the same classroom. Children traveled to the school by school bus, private and public transportation.

The large building that housed the school also provided rooms for single women who worked in the nearby Chicago Loop.

== Notable alumni ==
- Rosalind Marquis, actress
- Patrick Eugene Prendergast, assassin of Chicago mayor Carter Harrison Sr.
- Robert Sweitzer, politician
