= Oscar party =

Event held after the Academy Awards ceremony

An Oscar party or Oscars party is any of the several parties, usually held by entertainment-media corporations, immediately following the broadcast of the Academy Awards ceremony.

Parties attended by celebrities in the hours following the Academy Awards have been held since the beginning of the awards themselves, with the first Academy Awards presentation held on May 16, 1929, at a private dinner function at The Hollywood Roosevelt Hotel with an audience of about 270 people, being followed by a post-awards party held at the Mayfair Hotel. In 1958, an Oscar party called the Governors Ball was initiated, and over time became "the one Oscar party where almost everyone makes an appearance".

Some corporate sponsors of Oscar parties, such as Vanity Fair, are known for holding such a party every year, and the influence of the sponsor can be roughly measured by the caliber of the celebrities that attend their party. The Vanity Fair Oscars Party, first held in 1994, is considered to be one of the premiere Oscar parties, often seeing appearances by the biggest stars of the day. Many of these events have adopted a charitable theme, such as the Elton John AIDS Foundation Academy Award Party.
