= Measure ULA =

2022 Los Angeles ballot measure imposing a real estate transfer tax

- November 8, 2022
- Tax on $5 Million House Sales Initiative

Results
Choice	Votes	%
Yes	512,808	57.77%
No	374,934	42.23%
Total votes	887,742	100.00%

Measure ULA

City of Los Angeles
- Long title: Homelessness and Housing Solutions Tax
- Effective: April 1, 2023
- Introduced by: United to House LA coalition (voter initiative)
- Status: In force

Measure ULA (officially Proposition ULA or the Homelessness and Housing Solutions Tax, also known as the mansion tax), is a ballot measure approved by voters in the City of Los Angeles, California, in the November 2022 election. The measure imposes a 4% transfer tax on real property sales within Los Angeles city limits exceeding $5 million, and a 5.5% tax on sales over $10 million (adjusted annually for inflation) with revenue earmarked for affordable housing production and homelessness prevention programs. It was approved with 58% of the vote.

The measure was drafted and promoted by the United to House LA (UHLA) coalition, an alliance of labor unions, affordable housing organizations, tenant rights groups, and community organizations. As of May 2026, the tax has raised $1.2 billion over three years, substantially less than the city's projections of $0.6 to 1.1 billion annually. Some of the revenue is scheduled to fund construction of 1,790 affordable apartment units, at an average cost of $780,000 each. It has also faced criticism for its effects on the city's real estate market and housing construction.

== Background ==
Los Angeles has long faced problems with housing affordability and homelessness. Community initiative LA2050 has claimed that as of the early 2020s, 73% of Angelenos reported being "rent-burdened," and the city lacked an estimated 500,000 affordable housing units needed to meet demand. UHLA has criticized previous efforts to address the crisis, including Proposition HHH, a $1.2 billion housing bond passed in 2016, for cost overruns and slow implementation.

The concept for Measure ULA originated in 2019, when Denny Zane, founder and executive director of the housing and public transit activism organization Move LA, brought together a coalition of affordable housing advocates, labor leaders, and academics at the UNITE HERE Local 11 office in downtown Los Angeles to explore new revenue streams for housing and homelessness prevention. The group initially considered a tax on windfall rental income and a gross receipts tax on high-rent apartment buildings, but ultimately settled on a real estate transfer tax as the mechanism that would generate the most revenue and poll most favorably.

The resulting coalition, named United to House LA, was co-chaired by Laura Raymond of ACT-LA and April Verrett of SEIU Local 2015. It eventually grew to include numerous organizations, encompassing the Los Angeles County Federation of Labor, the LA/OC Building and Construction Trades Council, UNITE HERE Local 11, the United Teachers Los Angeles, the ACLU of Southern California, and numerous nonprofit housing developers and community groups. The coalition collected over 98,000 signatures to qualify the measure for the November 2022 ballot, exceeding the 60,000 required.

The Los Angeles Times endorsed the measure in October 2022. The real estate industry spent $8 million campaigning against it.

== Endorsements ==
Yes

Local officials

- Nithya Raman, city councilmember from the 4th district (2020–present)

Labor unions

- SEIU Local 2015
- UNITE HERE Local 11

Organizations

- ACLU Southern California
- Human Rights Watch
- Sierra Club Los Angeles
- Stonewall Democratic Club

Newspapers

- Los Angeles Times
No

Organizations

- Howard Jarvis Taxpayers Association
- Apartment Association of Greater Los Angeles
- Los Angeles Area Chamber of Commerce
- Los Angeles County Business Federation
- Greater Los Angeles Realtors

== Provisions ==
=== Tax rates and thresholds ===
Measure ULA imposes an additional transfer tax on all documents conveying real property within the City of Los Angeles when the consideration or value exceeds specified thresholds. The tax is paid by the seller and is applied to the full sale price of the property.

As originally enacted, the tax applied at two tiers: 4% on property sales exceeding $5 million but less than $10 million, and 5.5% on property sales of $10 million or more. The thresholds are adjusted annually for inflation. As of July 1, 2025, the thresholds were raised to $5.3 million and $10.6 million, respectively.

The ULA tax is imposed in addition to the existing combined city and county documentary transfer taxes of 0.56%. Some have claimed that because the tax applies to both residential and commercial real estate transactions, the "mansion tax" label by which the measure is widely known is misleading.

=== Exemptions ===
The measure provides exemptions for certain parties to transactions, including qualified affordable housing organizations, community land trusts, limited-equity housing cooperatives, some 501(c)(3) entities, and federal, state, and local government agencies.

=== Revenue allocation ===
Revenue from the tax is deposited into the House LA Fund and is earmarked for affordable housing and homelessness prevention programs. The measure specifies that 70% of funding is to be directed toward housing production and preservation, including supportive and affordable housing construction, non-traditional models of affordable housing (such as community land trusts), and preservation of existing affordable housing stock. The remaining 30% is allocated to tenant advocacy programs, funding eviction defense, emergency rental assistance, income support for low-income seniors and people with disabilities, and tenant outreach and education. Some of the revenue is scheduled to fund construction of 1,790 affordable apartment units, at an average cost of $780,000 each.

The measure established a Citizens Oversight Committee to monitor the implementation of funded programs and advise the city on allocation of resources.

As of April 30, 2026, of the $1.2 billion collected since enactment of the tax, only $120 million has been spent.

== Revenue and programs ==
=== Revenue performance ===
Proponents initially estimated that the measure would generate around $900 million per year, based on Los Angeles County Assessor data from fiscal year 2021-2022. Actual revenue for the first year of operation, starting April 2023, was $215 million. Cumulative revenue by December 2024 was $480 million.

The LA Controller projected ULA revenue at $270 million for fiscal year 2023-24 and $271 million for fiscal year 2024-25, less than half of its budget estimates at the time of adoption. As of January 2026, cumulative revenue was $1.1 billion, which some proponents of the measure estimated would be the annual return.

An April 2024 report by Occidental College blamed the lower-than-expected revenues on rising construction costs, reduced rates of construction and sales, and a rise in interest rates.

City Journal noted in February 2026 that Measure ULA had a "perverse interaction" with California Proposition 13, which limits tax increases by assessing the property at 1979 valuation plus a maximum 2% increase per year until the property changes ownership. Both measures discourage owners from selling, and the city loses potential increased revenue until they do. Because of this disincentive to sell, a Harvard Business School study estimated that 80% of the money raised via this tax will be lost from property taxes because of reduced property sales.

As of May 2026, the tax has raised $1.2 billion over three years, substantially less than the city's projections of $0.6 to 1.1 billion annually. 39% of the revenue from the tax has come from properties other than single-family homes.

=== Funded programs ===
Due to pending litigation, the city initially limited spending to $150 million. In December 2024, the Los Angeles City Council voted 12-0 to approve final guidelines for expanded Measure ULA programs, authorizing the city to access the full accumulated revenue of $480 million at that time.

Shelterforce, a nonprofit journalism outlet that covers affordable housing, reported in January 2025 that Measure ULA had funded $30 million to more than 4,000 households for emergency rental assistance, paid for 795 affordable housing units in nine separate projects, and provided legal defense renters facing eviction.

== Impact on the real estate market ==
=== Decline in transactions ===
Researchers at the UCLA Lewis Center for Regional Policy Studies found that since Measure ULA took effect, the likelihood of a Los Angeles property selling above its tax threshold fell by as much as 50%. The decline was particularly pronounced for non-single-family transactions, including commercial, industrial, and multifamily properties. The researchers concluded, "Together the evidence suggests that Measure ULA is neither a true 'Mansion Tax' nor a tax that falls solely on unearned property wealth. The tax does fall on mansions, but it also impedes the trade in commercial, industrial and multifamily property." The Lewis Center also found that sales of parcels with high redevelopment potential dropped by half following the measure's enactment, implying an annual tax revenue loss of $25 million.

A RAND Corporation study discovered that high-value property sales within Los Angeles declined by half over the first two years of the tax's implementation. An analysis published by Holthouse Carlin & Van Trigt LLP, an accounting firm serving real estate industry clients, found that transaction volume for properties above the ULA threshold declined by 80 percent, compared to a 41–61 percent decline across other Southern California markets unaffected by the tax.

=== Effect on housing production and renovation ===
Critics have raised concerns that the tax has impeded the construction of new multifamily housing. Because most multifamily development involves purchasing a development site and later selling the completed building, with both transactions subject to the tax, Measure ULA significantly increases the cost of new apartment construction. In an April 2025 report, UCLA Lewis Center researchers estimated that the measure was preventing the construction of roughly 1,900 housing units per year, including approximately 160 affordable units that would otherwise have been produced without public subsidy, and concluded that tax revenue would finance at most half as many affordable units as would have been built without the tax. The report's authors subsequently issued a corrigendum in June 2026 acknowledging errors in the study's estimates of the measure's impact on multifamily permitting, stating that the permitting findings were superseded by their later difference-in-differences analysis. That updated analysis continued to find a substantial decline in multifamily permitting attributable to the tax.

An April 2025 press release from the Measure ULA Citizen Oversight Committee claimed that Measure ULA had "built 800 new affordable homes" and "created 10,000 union construction jobs." This drew scrutiny from a UCLA professor of urban planning, who remarked to a reporter for LAist that the claims were "highly implausible" due to lack of construction. A spokesperson for the LA Housing Department subsequently qualified the jobs numbers as "an estimate, and not a guarantee of jobs that currently exist."

On October 1, 2025, the Los Angeles Times ran an article with the headline, "Almost no one is building new apartments in Los Angeles," citing Measure ULA among other factors. A February 2026 editorial in The Orange County Register asserted that "by reducing housing construction and driving up rents, Measure ULA arguably is worsening the city's homeless situation."

=== Methodological Dispute ===
The findings of the UCLA Lewis Center and RAND studies have been disputed. In September 2025, researchers affiliated with Occidental College's Urban and Environmental Policy Institute published a critique of the April 2025 UCLA Lewis Center report, arguing that its permitting analysis suffered from methodological flaws and that the reported decline reflected a reduction in the average size of new projects rather than in the number of units permitted. A follow-up reanalysis of the report's underlying permit data, published in 2026, concluded that there was no meaningful decline in monthly permitted units in the report's sample.

Critics of the studies have focused on the treatment of projects approved under Mayor Karen Bass's Executive Directive 1, a 2022 order expediting approvals for 100 percent affordable housing developments, which coincided with the tax's implementation. The report's authors excluded such projects from their analysis and argued that doing so biased their estimates downward; their critics have challenged both the exclusion itself and the direction of the claimed bias.

The United to House LA coalition, which sponsored the measure, also published a critique of the study and commissioned an economic analysis modeling whether waiving the tax would change the financial feasibility of multifamily projects; the analysis concluded that in most scenarios it would not, with interest rates and capitalization rates dominating feasibility.

The UCLA researchers defended their original work in an August 2025 response, "The Consequences of Measure ULA: Some Clarifications," disputing the reanalyses and arguing that the tax could impede redevelopment even where aggregate transaction data showed more modest changes.

== Legal challenges ==
In December 2022, the Howard Jarvis Taxpayers Association (HJTA) and the Apartment Association of Greater Los Angeles (AAGLA) filed a state court challenge arguing that Measure ULA violated the California Constitution. In October 2023, a Los Angeles County Superior Court judge dismissed the lawsuit. In December 2025, the California Courts of Appeal affirmed the lower court's decision, holding that the California Constitution provides voters the power to enact property transfer taxes such as Measure ULA. An HJTA attorney said that the organization would pursue further appeals.

In September 2023, a federal district court judge ruled to dismiss a challenge to Measure ULA from a group of property owners for lack of jurisdiction.

A coalition of California businesses advanced the Taxpayer Protection and Government Accountability Act, a statewide ballot measure that would have retroactively invalidated some local special taxes, potentially including Measure ULA. The California Supreme Court ruled in June 2024 that the measure could not appear on the November 2024 ballot.

== Reform proposals ==
=== Mayor Bass wildfire exemptions ===
Following the January 2025 Palisades Fire in Los Angeles, Mayor Karen Bass raised the possibility of suspending Measure ULA to aid rebuilding efforts. In October 2025, Bass formally requested that the City Council approve a targeted, one-time exemption for residential properties in the Pacific Palisades damaged or destroyed by the fires. The proposal would grant the Director of Finance authority to provide the exemption on a case-by-case basis. In November 2025, the City Council's Ad Hoc Committee for LA Recovery asked the City Attorney to report on the legal feasibility of the proposal.

=== Raman amendment proposal ===
In January 2026, Nithya Raman, chair of the Housing and Homelessness Committee and a member of the Democratic Socialists of America, introduced a motion in a City Council meeting to place amendments to Measure ULA on the June 2, 2026 ballot. The proposal would have exempted newly constructed multifamily, commercial, and mixed-use buildings from the tax for 15 years, created a three-year hardship exemption for properties affected by natural disasters, retroactive to the January 2025 fires, and modified financing terms to facilitate lending for ULA-funded affordable housing projects.

Raman argued that ULA was "sold to voters as a mansion tax" but had created "unintended consequences" for apartment construction. She warned that without local reform, the tax was vulnerable to more drastic rollbacks from a proposed statewide ballot measure backed by the Howard Jarvis Taxpayers Association. UHLA criticized the proposal for threatening to remove more than $100 million for programs ameliorating housing problems in Los Angeles. Measure ULA supporters at the council meeting accused Raman of succumbing to pressure from the real estate industry. The Council referred Raman's proposal to the Housing and Homelessness Committee for further review. The referral prevented the proposal from being included on the June ballot of that year.

=== 2026 California ballot proposition ===
In 2025, the Howard Jarvis Taxpayers Association began gathering signatures for a proposed California ballot proposition for the November 2026 ballot that would cap municipal transfer taxes statewide and impose new restrictions on local taxes more broadly. If passed, the measure would nullify not only Measure ULA but similar transfer taxes adopted by other California cities, including Santa Monica's Measure GS, while also capping municipal transfer taxes and restricting local revenue streams for housing and homelessness programs.

== See also ==
- Housing in California
- Homelessness in Los Angeles
- Transfer tax
- Community land trust
