= Measure GS =

2022 Santa Monica ballot measure imposing a real estate transfer tax

- November 8, 2022
- Funding for Homelessness Prevention, Affordable Housing, and Schools Initiative

Results
Choice	Votes	%
Yes	19,467	53.49%
No	16,926	46.51%
Total votes	36,393	100.00%

Measure GS, officially the Funding for Homelessness Prevention, Affordable Housing, and Schools Initiative, is a ballot measure approved by voters in Santa Monica, California, in the November 2022 election. The measure amended the city's real estate transfer tax code to add a third tier at a rate of $56 per $1,000 of value (5.6%) on property transfers of $8 million or more. Revenue is earmarked for homelessness prevention, affordable housing, and the Santa Monica-Malibu Unified School District. The measure was approved by 52% of voters. A competing, less aggressive transfer tax measure (Measure DT) was defeated on the same ballot.

The measure's legal validity was upheld in court following a challenge by the California Business Roundtable. Critics have argued it has suppressed high-value real estate transactions and raised less money than initial projections.

== Background ==
According to the U.S. Department of Housing and Urban Development, one in five Santa Monica renter households were both low-income and "severely cost-burdened," meaning they paid more than half of their income on rent and utilities. An additional one in ten renter households were low-income and "rent-burdened," paying between 30% and 50% of income on rent. Also, the state of California has ordered the city to provide 8,895 new housing units, with 6,200 designated affordable, by 2029. If the city does not, it will lose control of housing development approval processes, potentially leading to the construction of large developments into which the city will have no input.

The concept for Measure GS was developed by former mayor Sue Himmelrich in order to fund those concerns. The measure was endorsed by Santa Monicans for Renters' Rights, the Santa Monica Democratic Club, the Los Angeles County Democratic Party, and the progressive housing organization Santa Monica Forward, among others. Opponents, including developers and landlords, spent more than $500,000 campaigning against it.

== Measure DT ==
The November 2022 ballot featured a competing transfer tax measure, Measure DT, placed on the ballot by the Santa Monica City Council at the initiative of Councilmember Phil Brock. Measure DT proposed a transfer tax of $25 per $1,000 of value on the portion of property value exceeding $8 million, making it a marginal tax, unlike Measure GS, which applied to the entire transaction value. Measure DT also included a clause to expire after ten years with possible Council extension and to adjust the $8 million threshold for inflation.

Proponents of Measure GS characterized Measure DT as an attempt to split the vote and prevent GS from passing. Supporters of DT countered that GS's 5.6% rate represented an excessive increase of more than 800% over the existing transfer tax rate for properties in that bracket. They also asserted that the lack of an inflation adjustment would cause GS to affect an increasing number of properties over time. Voters defeated Measure DT, with 65% against to 35% in favor.

== Provisions ==
Measure GS amended Santa Monica Municipal Code Chapter 6.96 to add a third tier to the city's existing two-tier transfer tax structure, of $56.00 per $1,000 (5.6%) on the whole transaction value for property transfers of $8 million or more. The measure exempts certain kinds of affordable housing projects, nonprofit corporations, community land trusts, and governmental property sales. The ballot wording claimed that the measure would "[provide] an estimated $50,000,000 annually for homelessness prevention, affordable housing, and schools."

Of the 5.6% third tier rate, five percentage points are allocated to two designated funds, with the remaining 0.6% going to the city's General Fund. The first $10 million per year is deposited into the School Fund and provided to the Santa Monica-Malibu Unified School District. The next $40 million is deposited into the Homelessness Prevention and Affordable Housing Fund. Revenue exceeding $50 million is split 20% to the School Fund and 80% to the HPAH Fund.

The measure established an eleven-member Resident Oversight Committee responsible for making recommendations to the city council for use of funds and evaluating cost effectiveness of funded programs. It stipulates that "Four members shall be members of lower income households in Santa Monica, at least one of whom is a participant in a locally funded rent subsidy program (such as the Preserve Our Diversity programs), at least one of whom is a senior, at least one of whom has minor children, at least one of whom faces mental or physical challenges, and at least one of whom is formerly homeless."

== Revenue and impact ==
The city's proposed biennial budget for fiscal years 2023-25 incorporated the $50 million per year projection. In its first year of implementation, from March 2023 to February 2024, the measure raised $17 million.

An analysis of Santa Monica transactions published in the Santa Monica Daily Press found substantial declines in property sales above the $8 million threshold during the measure's first year. Residential sales at or above $8 million fell from 32 to 15. Commercial sales at or above $8 million fell from 18 to 5. Opportunities for trades connected to housing dropped 60% at the $8-million-plus tier. The author of the analysis noted that the measure produced the highest tax rate of any city in California.

== Legal challenge ==
In January 2023, the California Business Roundtable filed a lawsuit against the City of Santa Monica to block Measure GS, arguing that it violated the California Constitution's single-subject rule for ballot measures. The Roundtable contended that the measure improperly combined two unrelated subjects, funding for public schools and funding for affordable housing, in a single initiative, potentially causing voter confusion.

In August 2023, Los Angeles County Superior Court Judge H. Jay Ford III ruled in favor of the city, finding that the funded programs were sufficiently related that the measure did not violate the single-subject rule.

== Amendment efforts ==
In March 2024, former Santa Monica mayor Pam O'Connor filed a proposed initiative to exempt multifamily housing from the third-tier transfer tax, arguing that it impedes new apartment construction and threatens the city's ability to meet its state-mandated housing targets. She noted that "most of the housing units subject to Measure GS are apartments and renters - not mansions."

Himmelrich, the measure's original sponsor, opposed the amendment, arguing that Measure GS already exempted affordable housing projects and that the amendment was "the latest desperate effort by developers, landlords and their allies to undo Measure GS." Both the Santa Monica Democratic Club and Santa Monicans for Renters' Rights, which had supported Measure GS, formally opposed the amendment. Due to procedural complications involving the gathering of signatures, the amendment did not appear on the November 2024 ballot. O'Connor subsequently threatened to sue the city.

Measure GS faces potential nullification from a proposed statewide ballot measure organized by the Howard Jarvis Taxpayers Association that would cap municipal transfer taxes and earmarked taxation initiatives. If passed, the measure would sharply limit Measure GS and similar taxes adopted by other California cities, such as Measure ULA.

== See also ==
- Measure ULA
- Transfer tax
- Housing in California
- Homelessness in California
- Santa Monica-Malibu Unified School District
- Proposition 13
