= 2024 California Proposition 1 =

Proposition 1
- March 5, 2024
- Bonds for Mental Health Treatment Facilities

Results
Choice	Votes	%
Yes	3,636,734	50.18%
No	3,610,511	49.82%

Yes
70–80%
60–70%
50–60%
No
70–80%
60–70%
50–60%

Proposition 1, titled Bonds for Mental Health Treatment Facilities, was a California ballot proposition and state bond measure that was voted on in the 2024 primary election on March 5. Passing with just 50.18 percent of the vote, the proposition will provide additional behavioral health services and issue up to $6.38 billion in bonds to fund housing for veterans and homeless individuals. It will also move about $140 million of annual existing tax revenue for mental health care and addiction care to the state from the counties.

== Background ==
Since the enactment of a 2011 law, only state propositions placed on the ballot by the California State Legislature may appear on the primary election ballot. In addition, the California Constitution mandates that any measure that issues more than $300,000 in bonds must be approved by voters.

Governor Gavin Newsom first proposed the bond measure in March 2023 to help modernize the state's mental health system, as well as reform the California Mental Health Services Act (MHSA) that was originally passed by voters as Proposition 63 in 2004. State senator Susan Eggman then introduced the proposal in the state legislature, where it was then approved in September 2023.

== Support ==
Supporters of the proposition argued that more mental health and housing initiatives were necessary in the state.

Supporters

Statewide officials

- Gavin Newsom, Governor of California (2019–present)

State senators

- Susan Eggman, Member of the California State Senate from the 5th district (2020–present)

Organizations

- California Chamber of Commerce

Political parties

- California Democratic Party

Labor unions

- California Federation of Teachers
- California Federation of Labor
- California Teachers Association
- IBEW Local 1245

Newspapers

- Los Angeles Times
- San Francisco Chronicle

Other

- San Diego County Board of Supervisors

== Opposition ==
Opponents of the proposition argued that the program was an unfunded mandate and that it could cut county mental health programs.

Opponents

State senators

- Brian Jones, Minority Leader of the California Senate (2022–present)

State assemblymembers

- Diane Dixon, Member of the California State Assembly from the 72nd district (2022–present)

Organizations

- California College Republicans
- Howard Jarvis Taxpayers Association
- League of Women Voters of California

Political parties

- Peace and Freedom Party

Newspapers

- The Orange County Register

Other

- Placer County Board of Supervisors

== Polling ==
Date of opinion poll	Conducted by	Sample size (Note: Key: A – all adults RV – registered voters LV – likely voters V – unclear)	Margin of Error	In favor	Against	Undecided
February 6–13, 2024	Public Policy Institute of California	1,075 (LV)	± 3.9%	59%	38%	2%
January 21–29, 2024	University of Southern California/CSU Long Beach/Cal Poly Pomona	1,416 (LV)	± 2.6%	66%	21%	14%
December 15–19, 2023	Morning Consult/Politico	1,005 (RV)	± 3.0%	72%	28%	–

== Results ==
The results were certified on April 12, 2024. The proposition passed with 50.18 percent "Yes" votes versus 49.82 percent "No" votes.

Proposition 1
Choice	Votes	%
For	3,636,734	50.18
Against	3,610,511	49.82
Total	7,247,245	100.00

Proposition 1 results (excluding invalid votes)
Yes; 3,636,734 (50.2%)	No; 3,610,511 (49.8%)
▲50%

== See also ==
- 2024 United States ballot measures
- Homelessness in California
