= Homelessness in California =

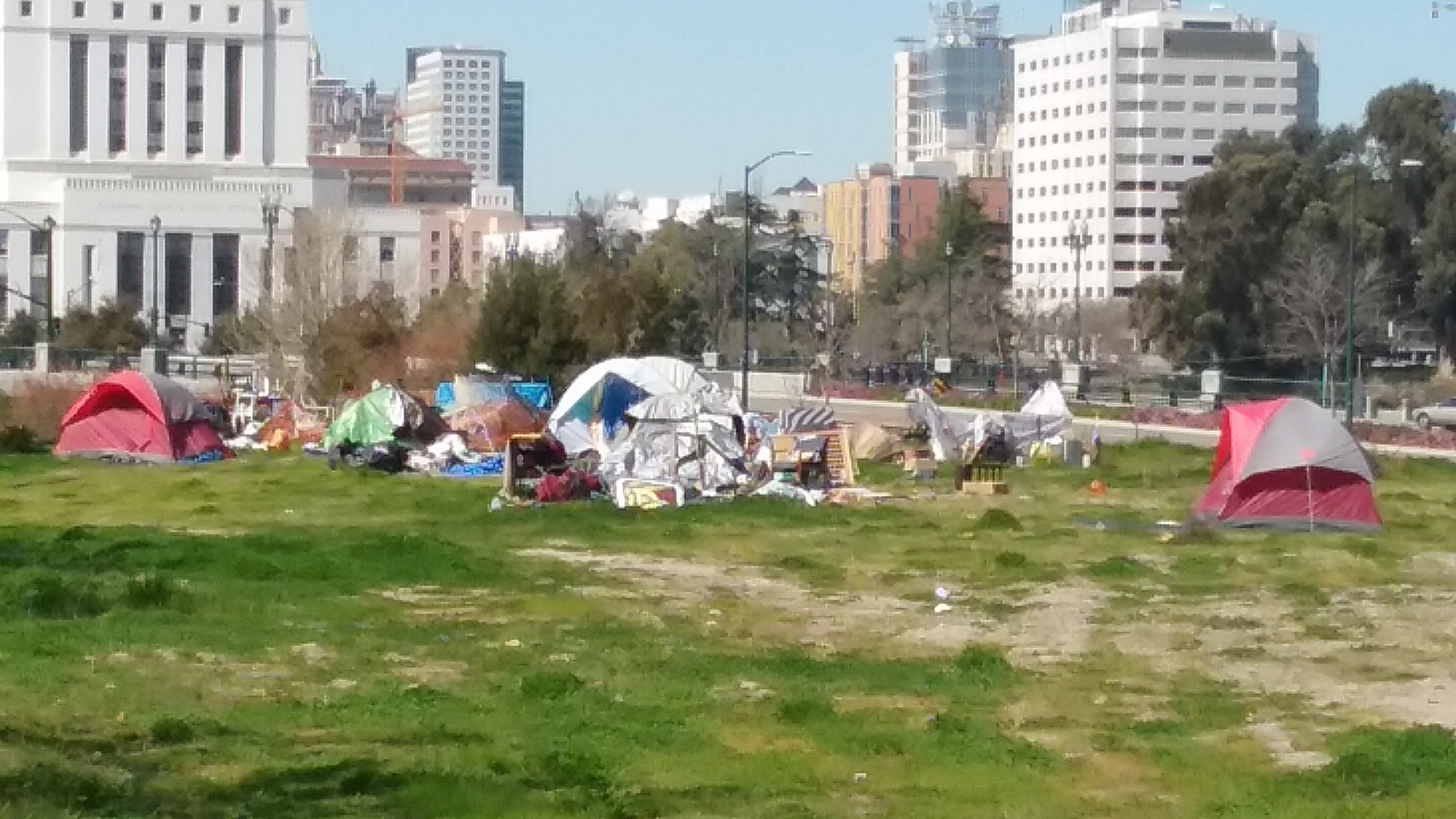
A tent city on East 12th Street in Oakland, California, set up by local homeless people, 2019

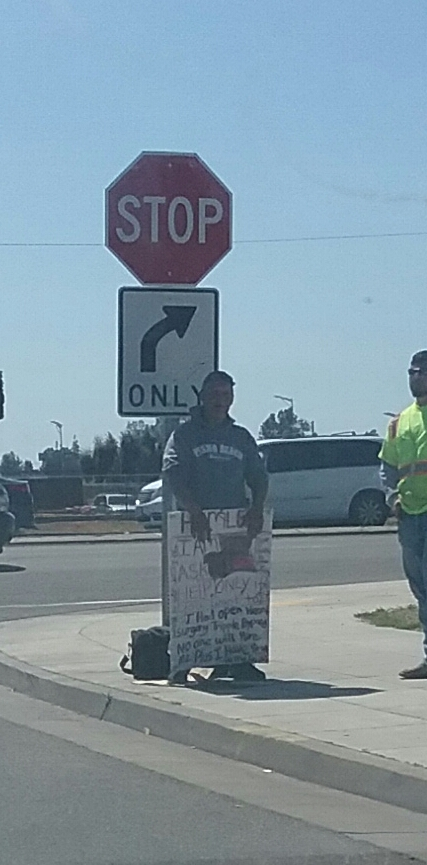
Homeless man in Fresno, California, 2019

In January 2024 at least 187,084 people were experiencing homelessness in California, according to the United States Department of Housing and Urban Development. This is 0.48% of California's population, one of the highest per capita rates in the nation.

California has the highest percentage of unsheltered homeless people among all U.S. states, with two-thirds of its homeless population sleeping on the streets, in encampments, or in their cars. Nearly one in four homeless people in the U.S., and 45% of unsheltered homeless people, live in California. Even those who are sheltered are so insecurely: 90% of homeless adults in California spent at least one night without shelter in a six-month period.

5% of California schoolchildren are homeless (this includes students who are "temporarily doubled-up" at another family's home).

A statewide housing shortage drives the homelessness crisis. A 2022 study found that differences in per capita homelessness rates across the United States are not due to differing rates of mental illness, drug addiction, or poverty, but to differences in the cost of housing. West Coast cities including San Francisco, Los Angeles, and San Diego have homelessness rates five times as high as areas with much lower housing costs like Arkansas, West Virginia, and Detroit, even though the latter locations have high burdens of opioid addiction and poverty. California has the second lowest number of housing units per capita, and an estimated shortage of one million homes that are affordable to the lowest income renters. Another 2022 study found that moderate decreases in rents would significantly reduce homelessness. A 2023 study published by the University of California, San Francisco also found that the high cost of housing was the greatest obstacle to reducing homelessness.

From 2007 to 2023, California's homeless population grew more than any other state's. While the national homeless population decreased by 18% between 2010 and 2020, California's increased by 31%. This trend continued from 2020 to 2022, when California's homeless population grew by 6% while the rest of the country saw an increase of less than 0.5%. A 2021 survey revealed that 19% of Californians reported that they or someone close to them had experienced homelessness in the previous five years.

36% of homeless people in California are categorized as "chronically homeless"—which means "they have a long-standing disability that significantly impedes their ability to live independently and have been unhoused for a consecutive year or on at least four occasions within a three-year period." The remaining 64% are categorized as "experiencing short-term homelessness" though many may have been homeless for similar durations without meeting the disability criterion for chronic homelessness.

80% of homeless people in California are adults not with children; 40% of those are aged 50 and older. 14% are families with children. 7% are unaccompanied young people (defined as being under age 25). Homelessness in California disproportionately affects African Americans, Native Americans, and Pacific Islanders. One in four homeless people who used a homeless service provider were black, despite making up only 5% of California's population.

== Health aspects ==
From 2019 to 2020, homeless people were hospitalized in California 237,541 times and made 658,644 emergency department visits. This represents about 3% of hospital encounters in California hospitals.

Among homeless adults in California, 45% describe their health as "poor or fair," and 60% report having a chronic disease.

In March 2019 The Atlantic reported on outbreaks of tuberculosis and typhus in homeless shelters throughout California. These outbreaks have been described as a "public-health crisis" and a "disaster" by public health officials who are concerned they might spread into the general population.

Street medicine is defined as "health and social services developed specifically to address the unique needs and circumstances of the unsheltered homeless, delivered directly to them in their own environment." Street medicine programs deliver health services directly to unsheltered people in their environments. These services include chronic condition diagnosis, disease management, and preventive medicine. As of 2021 there were at least 25 street medicine programs operating in California. While the average program serves 615 patients and conducts 2,352 patient visits annually, most programs operate at a smaller scale, serving fewer than 500 patients and conducting fewer than 500 visits.

A representative survey found that 82% of homeless adults had experienced a mental health condition at some point, 66% currently experience symptoms of mental illness, and 27% had required mental health hospitalization.

The survey revealed that 65% had used illegal drugs regularly at some point, and 62% had experienced periods of heavy drinking. While 57% had received treatment for substance use disorder, current substance use remains significant: 31% use methamphetamines, and 16% report alcohol abuse. 20% had required medical attention for an overdose. 24% saw their substance use as a problem. Among those using drugs or alcohol regularly, 20% want treatment but cannot access it.

== Possible causes ==
=== Insufficient housing ===
In California, housing costs are exceptionally high and the supply of affordable housing is low. California ranks 49th among U.S. states in housing units per capita. As of 2021 California had only 24 available homes that were considered affordable for every 100 lowest-income renter households. This creates a deficit of about one million affordable homes.

The 2022 book Homelessness is a Housing Problem looks at per capita homelessness rates across the country and what factors influence the rates. It concludes that high rates of homelessness are caused by shortages of affordable housing, not by mental illness, drug addiction, or poverty. While mental illness, drug addiction, and poverty exist nationwide, high homelessness rates correlate specifically with housing shortages and high housing costs. For example, Arkansas and West Virginia have high rates of opioid addiction but low homelessness rates due to affordable housing. Similarly, Detroit, despite significant poverty, has a homelessness rate only one-fifth that of major West Coast cities. Large cities like Los Angeles and San Francisco attribute increases in the number of people experiencing homelessness to the housing shortage.

Where housing is expensive, it is more difficult for potentially-homeless people to find their own housing, and it is also less likely that their friends or family will have spare bedrooms or will otherwise have extra space to accommodate them.

A 2002 study found "the incidence of homelessness [in California] varies inversely with housing vacancy rates and positively with the market rent for just-standard housing" and concluded that "moderate increases in housing vacancy rates and moderate decreases in market rents are sufficient to generate substantial declines in homelessness."

In San Diego, according to a 2023 report, aggressive evictions and rent increases of some 43–64% on vacant properties have contributed to the problem.

A 2024 report from the California Housing Partnership and San Diego Housing Federation found that San Diego County had a shortage of more than 134,500 homes for low-income renters.

=== Deinstitutionalization ===
The United States pursued a policy of deinstitutionalization from the 1960s through the 1980s, closing state mental hospitals in favor of community-based psychiatric facilities. However, California (and other states) were unable to effectively fill the gap, providing fewer inpatient beds than needed to support individuals experiencing mental health crises. From 1955 to 2016, the number of public psychiatric hospitals fell from 558,239 to 37,209. As of 2022, California had an rough deficit of 7,730 fewer acute impatient, sub-acute impatient, and community residential beds than needed. This lack leads to mentally ill patients becoming more prevalent in other facilities, such as the ER, community-based organizations, jails, and prisons, or on the streets. A survey of homeless individuals in California found that 82% of participants had experienced a period of having a severe mental health condition and 27% had been hospitalized. A study of homeless individuals also found that the experience and stresses of being unsheltered exacerbated mental health conditions and symptoms, such as depression, hallucinations, anxiety, and memory issues.

=== Criminal justice system ===
As mental hospitals closed, the prison system expanded, shifting many people with serious mental illness from hospitals to jails and prisons. By 2012 there were about ten times as many mentally ill people incarcerated in the United States as there were in hospitals.

More than 75% of homeless adults in California report having been jailed or imprisoned. Recent California reforms meant to reduce mass incarceration have released many mentally ill prisoners, who face particular challenges in finding housing due to their mental health needs, incarceration-related trauma, and the stigma of criminal records.

A survey of homeless adults in California found that 19% had become homeless directly from an institutional setting such as a jail or prison. Most reported having received no sort of transitional services to prevent homelessness.

Service providers and individuals experiencing homelessness both recognize a cycle of homelessness and incarceration:

1. Over-enforcement and criminalization
2. Warrants, citations, and arrests
3. Longer periods in jail and prison
4. Increased obstacles and restrictions on release

This has been attributed to structural barriers that can make accessing resources and navigating the systems difficult as well as internal barriers such as stigma or discrimination. In California, criminalization of homelessness has increased. Homeless people come in contact with law enforcement at higher rates and receive more citations and arrests for survival behaviors and activities (e.g. camping outside or soliciting help).

See below for how policy makers have criminalized homelessness

=== Climate ===
California's mild climate influences how poorer people make housing decisions. In regions with harsh winters, people prioritize maintaining housing to avoid dangerous weather exposure. However, in California's milder climate people with high housing costs may choose to dedicate limited funds to other needs, even if this increases their risk of homelessness. California's areas with colder winter temperatures have lower homelessness rates.

It does not seem to be the case that many homeless people migrate to California from elsewhere. A survey found that 90% of homeless adults in California became homeless while already living in the state. Furthermore, 75% remain in the same county where they last had housing.

== Subgroups ==
=== Youth ===
Under the federal McKinney-Vento Act, schools are required to count their homeless students throughout the school year to ensure they receive services. Homeless students also have the right to stay enrolled in their original school even if they move.

Of all unaccompanied homeless young people (under the age of 25 not accompanied by parents or guardians) in the United States, 24% live in California. They represent about 5% of the homeless people in California. 60% of them are unsheltered.

Young people experience unaccompanied homelessness through various circumstances. Some are forced from their homes by parents who reject their gender identity or sexual orientation, react negatively to their pregnancy, or perpetrate abuse. Others leave their homes to escape abuse, neglect, conflict, or poverty.

In addition, more than 220,000 public school (K–12) students in California experienced homelessness in 2020–21.

In FY 2016, the Department of Housing and Urban Development (HUD) began funding the Youth Homelessness Demonstration Program (YHDP), "a coordinated community approach to preventing and ending youth homelessness." For FY 2022, the HUD awarded $60 million to target youth homelessness in 16 communities, including California's Riverside County. HUD said this was meant to "support a wide range of housing programs, including rapid rehousing, permanent supportive housing, transitional housing, and host homes."

During the 2022–23 school year, the homeless rate of students enrolled in California schools rose 9%, from the previous year, to 230,443. Schools related the spike in the rate of homelessness due to both families' worsening financial situations and improved identification efforts.

=== Women and LGBTQ+ ===
A 2023 study examined the role of gender and sexual orientation in homelessness.

The study revealed that women comprise 30% of California's homeless population, and transgender or non-binary individuals 1%. About "9% of participants identified as being lesbian, gay, bisexual, pansexual, queer, or another non-heterosexual sexual identity".

In California, 8% of homeless women are pregnant and 26% have been pregnant while homeless. Homeless people who are pregnant often struggle with access to care and face discrimination from healthcare providers which deters them from seeking healthcare when they need it.

66% of unhoused families are headed by women.

=== Victims of violence ===
A 2023 study documented high rates of violence victimization, with transgender and non-binary individuals facing the highest risk. Physical violence affected 70% of men, 75% of women, and 87% of transgender and non-binary people. Sexual violence was "more common among cisgender women (43%) and trans/non-binary (74%) participants rather than cisgender men (17%)."

Couples who are in abusive relationships may get evicted because of noise complaints or property damage. Some victims will be kicked out of their homes by their abuser or because they are being stalked by their abuser, who is causing property damage, which leads to eviction for the victim. Additionally, poor credit, from financial abuse, can prevent victims from obtaining new housing. When victims leave to go to a domestic violence shelter, they need proof that they have been abused. Proof can come from either hospital records or police, but if victims don't have proof of domestic violence, they are not able to enter a domestic violence shelter. Victims are often unable to enter a shelter because they are at capacity. Sometimes if there is space victims still don't go because they can't bring their children or pets.

=== University Students ===
Homelessness in California for students, often among UC and CCC students, takes shape in “couch surfing,” meaning students will temporarily stay with someone like a relative or friend, which is followed by staying in places such as hotels or motels. The issue of student homelessness affects some students more than others. Homelessness rates are higher among specific student demographics, like Black students, LGBTQ students, and Federal Pell Grant reciprocate students, As recent as of April 2024, across California of 20% of CCC, 10% of CSU and 5% of UC students experience homelessness, As of May 2023, indicated that a survey asking students about housing found that 65% at CCC, 52% at CSU, and 27% at UCs experience housing insecurity. From 2019 - 2020 to 2022 - 2023 that off campus housing and board costs of living for students increased due to inflation: CCC 36%, CSU 21%, and 22% for UCs. As of Fall 2024 in the same report shows that, among the UCs, 41% of their students were accommodated for housing while also having a waitlist for housing with more than 13,000 across all UC campuses.

In 2024, Senate Bill SB 108, a part of the California Budget Act 2024, was authored by Senator Scott Wiener for District 11 in San Francisco; in Section 2.00 allocated additional funding that would provide students with rapid housing programs. The California Legislature set in Provision 7, $3,700,000 for the UC's, plus an additional $15,800,000 in Provision 5, for student basic needs, in Provision 2.5, $6,800,000 for CSU and in Provision 19(g) $20,562,000 for CCC. for programs that assist in rapid homelessness services and housing for uses such as rental subsidies, emergency housing, emergency grants, case management, and partnerships with other organizations that could contribute to providing homelessness services. The legislation requires the UC's, CSU, and CCC to report certain areas of information to the state about students who are being served, the distributions, and where the funds are being used.

== State-level political action ==
California adopted the Housing First model in 2016 to guide its homelessness programs, but the state's severe housing shortage complicated implementation.

In 2021, the California State Auditor reported that "[a]t least nine state agencies administer and oversee 41 different programs that provide funding to mitigate homelessness, yet no single entity oversees the State's efforts or is responsible for developing a statewide strategic plan."

Between 2018 and 2021, California spent $9.6 billion on homelessness initiatives and provided services to 571,000 people. However, most recipients remained unhoused, and the state's homeless population increased during this period.

In November 2022, Governor Newsom confronted counties over what he called "simply unacceptable" homelessness reduction plans, which projected only a 2% decrease over four years. He initially threatened to withhold state funding but later released the funds after counties agreed to develop more ambitious proposals.

In 2023, Governor Newsom allocated $20 million in grants to 22 Native American tribes in California to address housing insecurity and to prevent homelessness in Native American communities.

An April 2024 investigation by The Guardian and Type Investigations found that the state had paid $100 million to private companies to clear homeless encampments, amid allegations of mistreatment.

In 2024, California voters passed Proposition 1, which authorizes up to $6.38 billion in bonds to fund housing for veterans and the homeless, as well as mental health and drug and alcohol treatment facilities.

=== Homeless Data Integration System ===
The U.S. Department of Housing and Urban Development created the Continuum of Care (CoC) system in 1993 to organize HUD funding distribution. This system divides states into regions that include homeless service providers and local governments. California contains 44 CoC regions.

To improve data coordination among these regions, California adopted the Homeless Data Integration System (HDIS) in April 2021. The California Interagency Council on Homelessness manages HDIS, which consolidates data from all state CoCs.

=== Housing roadblock reforms ===
California has enacted several laws to overcome local resistance to housing construction. For example, SB35 (2017) streamlined approval processes for multifamily housing developments, and SB9 (2021) expanded homeowners' rights to build additional housing units or subdivide their properties.

In 2022, a lawsuit was filed by Redondo Beach, Carson, Torrance, Del Mar, and Whitter challenging the constitutionality of SB9. In 2024, the Superior Court of Los Angeles ruled that SB9 was unconstitutional because it was not narrowly tailored to its policy goal, and encroached on the municipal autonomy granted to charter cities under Article XI, Section 5 of the California Constitution. Until the Legislature amends SB9 to reasonably relate policy to purpose, the law is non-binding to the five petitioner cities.

Local governments have historically restricted housing development through measures like single-family zoning, often supported by homeowners who benefit from housing scarcity and rising property values. In 2021, California limited local governments' power to block housing construction. In 2023, the state government became more assertive about rejecting local housing & zoning plans that it viewed as being unreasonably restrictive. In some cases, this meant housing developments could receive automatic approval without local government authorization.

=== Tiny house villages ===
In 2023, California initiated a $30 million tiny house program as an alternative to homeless encampments. The state planned to distribute 1,200 units across four locations: 500 in Los Angeles, 350 in Sacramento, 200 in San Jose, and 150 in San Diego County. These tiny houses serve as interim housing for people experiencing homelessness and cost approximately $73,000 each to build—significantly less than constructing permanent housing in California.

=== Hospital discharge plans ===
California has attempted to improve healthcare transitions for homeless patients. SB 1152 (2019) requires hospitals to create discharge plans for homeless patients and ensure they have food, shelter, medicine, and clothing for post-hospital care. While Medi-Cal offers free health insurance to many homeless people, it can be arduous for homeless people to apply, preventing many from obtaining coverage.

=== Projects Roomkey and Homekey ===
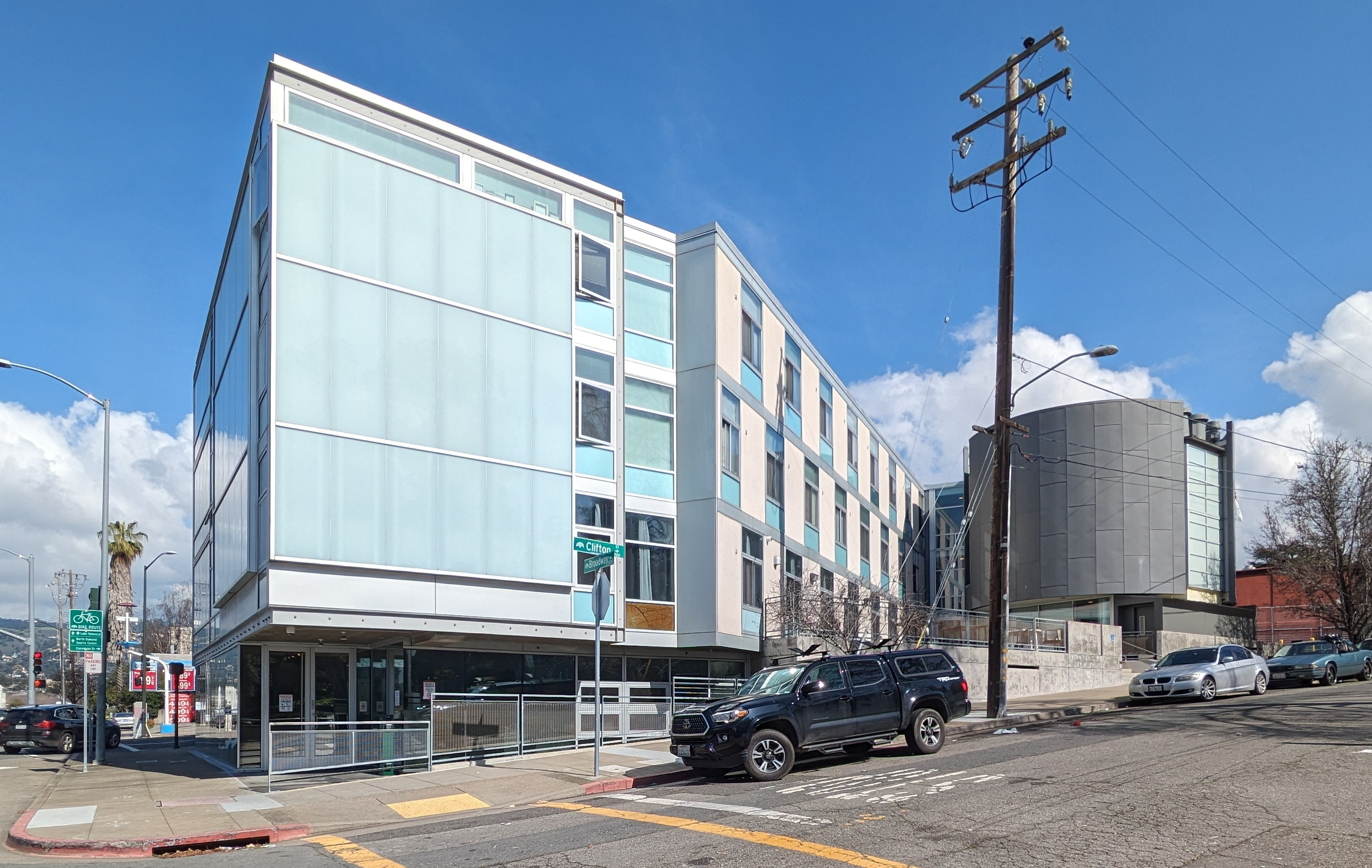
Clifton Hall, a former California College of the Arts dorm, was bought by the city of Oakland using Homekey funds and converted to public housing for people experiencing homelessness.

California launched Project Roomkey in March 2020 as an emergency response to protect homeless people from COVID-19. Initially funded by FEMA, the program housed vulnerable homeless individuals—particularly those over 65 or with underlying medical conditions—in vacant hotel and motel rooms. Though scheduled to end in late 2020, the program continued with state and local funding.

Project Homekey, an extension of Project Roomkey, focuses on converting hotels, motels, vacant apartments, and other buildings into low-cost housing. The program's first phase, funded by $600 million from federal COVID relief (CARES Act) and California's general fund, ended in December 2020. This phase converted 94 hotels and motels into approximately 6,000 permanent housing units. By early 2024, Project Homekey had created 15,000 housing units, exhausting its total allocation of $3.5 billion.

In September 2024, Homekey+ was unveiled. It is a $2.2 billion program to create permanent supportive housing for veterans and individuals experiencing mental health or substance use disorders.

=== Forced mental-health and addiction treatment ===
In September 2022, California established "CARE courts" with broad bipartisan support. These county-level courts can mandate housing and treatment programs for people with untreated schizophrenia or psychosis. Under this system, families, clinicians, first responders, and behavioral health specialists can petition the court. If clinical assessment determines that an individual is severely endangered or threatens others due to untreated schizophrenia or psychosis, judges can order up to 24 months of medication, substance abuse treatment, and housing.

A bipartisan group of mayors gave tentative support, but the group Disability Rights California sued to stop the implementation of the law.

In October 2023, SB 43 was passed to make it easier for the government to involuntarily confine and treat a person with a mental illness or substance use disorder who is "unable to provide for their personal safety or necessary medical care." SB 43 partially reversed the Lanterman–Petris–Short Act, a law dating to the governorship of Ronald Reagan in 1967, which restricted the government's ability to involuntarily confine and treat people with mental illnesses.

=== Mental health housing and residential services ===
In 2024 California Proposition 1 was passed by a slim majority of California voters. Under its provisions the state will provide additional behavioral health services and issue up to $6.38 billion in bonds to fund housing for veterans and homeless individuals. It also moves about $140 million of annual allocations for mental health care and addiction care from the counties to the state.

=== Housing assistance via Medi-Cal ===
California launched the CalAIM program in 2022, allowing some vulnerable patients to use their health insurance plans for housing-related needs, including finding affordable housing, paying rental deposits, preventing evictions, and addressing home health hazards. A pilot program conducted in Alameda County in 2016–2021 assisted 30,000 patients. Of those who were homeless, 36% obtained permanent housing.

Federal authorization to use Medi-Cal (California's Medicaid program) for housing purposes lasts through 2026.

California requested federal authorization to expand these services by providing short-term rent subsidies to homeless patients and those at risk of losing their homes.

=== Criminalization of homelessness ===
See above, in Criminal justice system, for how criminalization of homelessness leads to a cycle of homelessness and incarceration.

Local governments in California have experimented with criminalizing homelessness. For example, some jurisdictions have made it a crime to sleep outdoors or in motor vehicles.

The Court of Appeals for the Ninth Circuit's 2018 ruling in Martin v. Boise temporarily restricted California governments' abilities to enforce such anti-vagrancy laws. The court held that cities could not criminalize sleeping outdoors on public property if there were not enough shelter beds available for homeless people, as this would violate the Eighth Amendment to the US Constitution.

[T]he Eighth Amendment prohibits the imposition of criminal penalties for sitting, sleeping, or lying outside on public property for homeless individuals who cannot obtain shelter.... That is, as long as there is no option of sleeping indoors, the government cannot criminalize indigent, homeless people for sleeping outdoors, on public property, on the false premise they had a choice in the matter.

— Martin v. Boise

In September 2022, the Ninth Circuit reaffirmed this restriction, invalidating the use of anti-sleeping, anti-camping, and park exclusion ordinances to criminalize homelessness:

...the City of Grants Pass cannot, consistent with the Eighth Amendment, enforce its anti-camping ordinances against homeless persons for the mere act of sleeping outside with rudimentary protection from the elements, or for sleeping in their car at night, when there is no other place in the City for them to go.

— Opinion, Johnson v. Grants Pass

However, in June 2024, the Supreme Court in City of Grants Pass v. Johnson, ruled that the Ninth Circuit had decided the case wrongly, and that "enforcement of generally applicable laws regulating camping on public property does not constitute 'cruel and unusual punishment' prohibited by the Eighth Amendment."

The ruling freed up California governments to again criminalize homelessness (not directly, by criminalizing the status of being homeless, which would still be unconstitutional under surviving precedent, but indirectly, by criminalizing, for example, sleeping outdoors).

After the Supreme Court ruling, California Governor Gavin Newsom issued an executive order directing the California Departments of Parks and Recreation and Fish and Wildlife to adopt the California Department of Transportation's model of razing homeless encampments, regardless of whether homeless shelters are available. The National Homelessness Law Center stated that the order was "a misdirection of a systemic problem onto the victims." The order did not mandate that an alternative shelter be provided to homeless encampment residents, but it does require agencies (and urges local leaders) to connect people with service providers.

=== Public bathrooms ===
California law requires establishments run by public agencies to have bathroom facilities available for the public, provided without any cost or charge.

A proposed Right to Restrooms Act would require that local governments inventory existing public restroom facilities in public databases that could be accessed by the public and by homeless services providers. The bill died in committee.

=== Comparisons to and lessons from Texas ===
From 2012 to 2022, California's homeless population increased by 43%, while Texas's decreased by 28%. For select cities and localities, the divergence was even greater, with Sacramento County's homelessness increasing by 230% over the same period, Los Angeles County's increasing by 106%, while Houston's decreased by 57%.

The primary factor behind California's higher homelessness rate—five times that of Texas per capita—is housing costs. California's median one-bedroom apartment rents for $2,200 monthly, compared to $1,200 in Texas. This cost difference stems largely from California's stricter land-use and zoning regulations, which limit housing construction. Houston, for example, has no zoning. In 2022, despite having nine million fewer residents, Texas issued more than twice as many housing permits as California.

The states also differ in their policy approaches. Texas concentrates its homelessness funding on permanent housing, while California divides resources between temporary shelters and permanent housing. Texas agencies coordinate their efforts effectively, unlike in California, where agencies often compete for funding. For example, in Los Angeles County, four separate government agencies compete for the same state dollars.

Politicians and policy makers from California have visited Texas cities and homeless services organizations to see if lessons from Texas can be applied in California.

== County and local-level political action ==
=== Alameda County ===
==== City of Fremont ====
In February 2025, Fremont City Council approved a city ordinance that bans camping throughout the entire city. The ordinance also makes anyone "aiding, abetting or concealing" a homeless encampment guilty of a misdemeanor and possibly charged with a $1,000 fine and six months in jail. UC Berkeley Law professor Laura Riley, told CalMatters, the ordinance does not specify what qualifies as aiding, abetting or concealing, leaving some uncertainty as to how the ordinance will be enforced.

=== Fresno County ===
==== City of Fresno ====
Fresno has experienced a significant increase in homelessness despite having some of California's most affordable housing.

The COVID-19 pandemic worsened financial instability for many Fresno residents, leading to more people living without shelter. The 2023 Fresno-Madera Continuum of Care Point-In-Time Count showed the largest increase in a decade in unsheltered people between 2019 and 2020.

Fresno's relatively low housing costs attracted many financially struggling people from across California during the pandemic. This influx created a shortage of affordable housing for Fresno's existing unhoused residents. The combination of pre-existing poverty and population growth increased housing insecurity among low-income residents, while rising rents further reduced affordable housing availability.

=== Los Angeles County ===
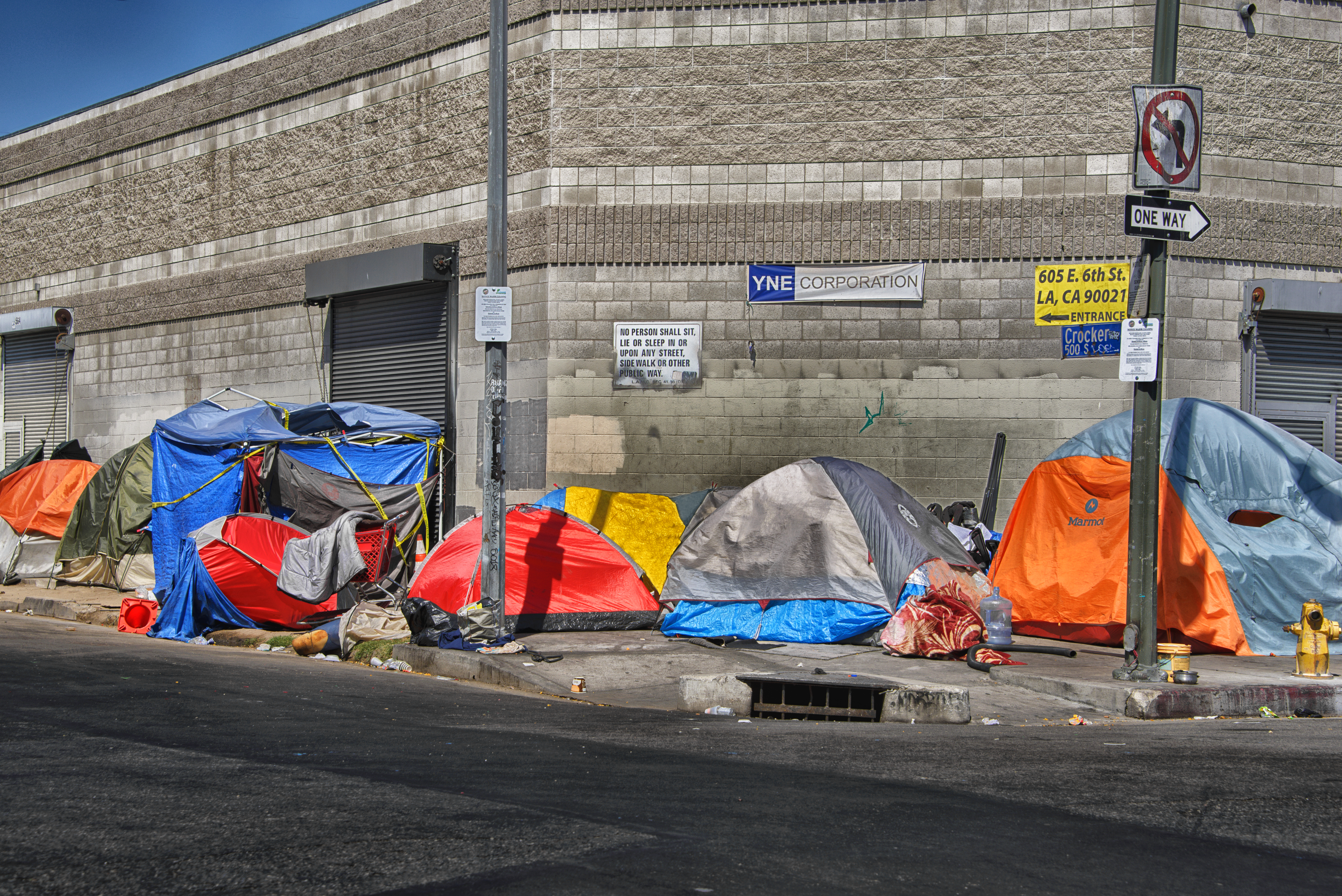
Tents of homeless people in Skid Row, Los Angeles, 2018

As of February 2022 more than 40% of people experiencing homelessness in California lived in Los Angeles County. The homeless population there increased by 65% between 2020 and 2022.

In 2023, more than 75,500 people were homeless in the county, up from 69,000 the previous year and 70% higher than 2015. The number who were unsheltered rose at an even higher rate, to 55,000 (the number who were sheltered declined slightly). The number of people who were "chronically homeless" (homeless for more than a year with a disabling condition) increased to 32,000 people. 25% reported experiencing severe mental illness, and 30% reported having a substance use disorder. 43% were Latino, 31% Black, 2% Asian.

A 2018 count found 565 homeless Native Americans in L.A. County. A second count in 2019 found 1,692 Native Americans who were unsheltered. The majority identified as men, and were more likely to identify as LGBT compared to the general unsheltered population. In 2020, 1.1% of the 66,436 homeless counted in L.A. County identified as American-Indian/Alaskan Native.

There are an estimated 4,021 homeless youth on any given night in L.A. County as of 2019, a 22% increase over 2018, per the Greater Los Angeles Youth Homeless Count, which defines youth as people 24 years old and younger. A 2013 census noted that 18.2% of homeless people had a physical disability; 68.2% were male, and 57.6% were between 25 and 54 years old.

In 2016 the County Board of Supervisors urged the governor "to declare a state of emergency with respect to homelessness." In 2019, the governor granted this request.

County Supervisor Mark Ridley-Thomas said that homelessness had reached emergency levels, with over 900 people dying on the streets in 2018, and over a thousand projected to die in 2019. Exposure to the elements cuts the lifespan of those who survive on the streets by 20 years. He attributed the crisis to rising rents, lack of affordable housing, and stagnant wages.

In 2019, Los Angeles spent $619 million on 36,000 homeless people, approximately $17,194 per person. However, the number of people who are homeless continues to grow. Peter Lynn, head of the Los Angeles Homeless Service Authority who saw homelessness rise 33% during his five years in spite of $780 million in additional funding, resigned his job at the end of 2019.

==== City of Los Angeles ====
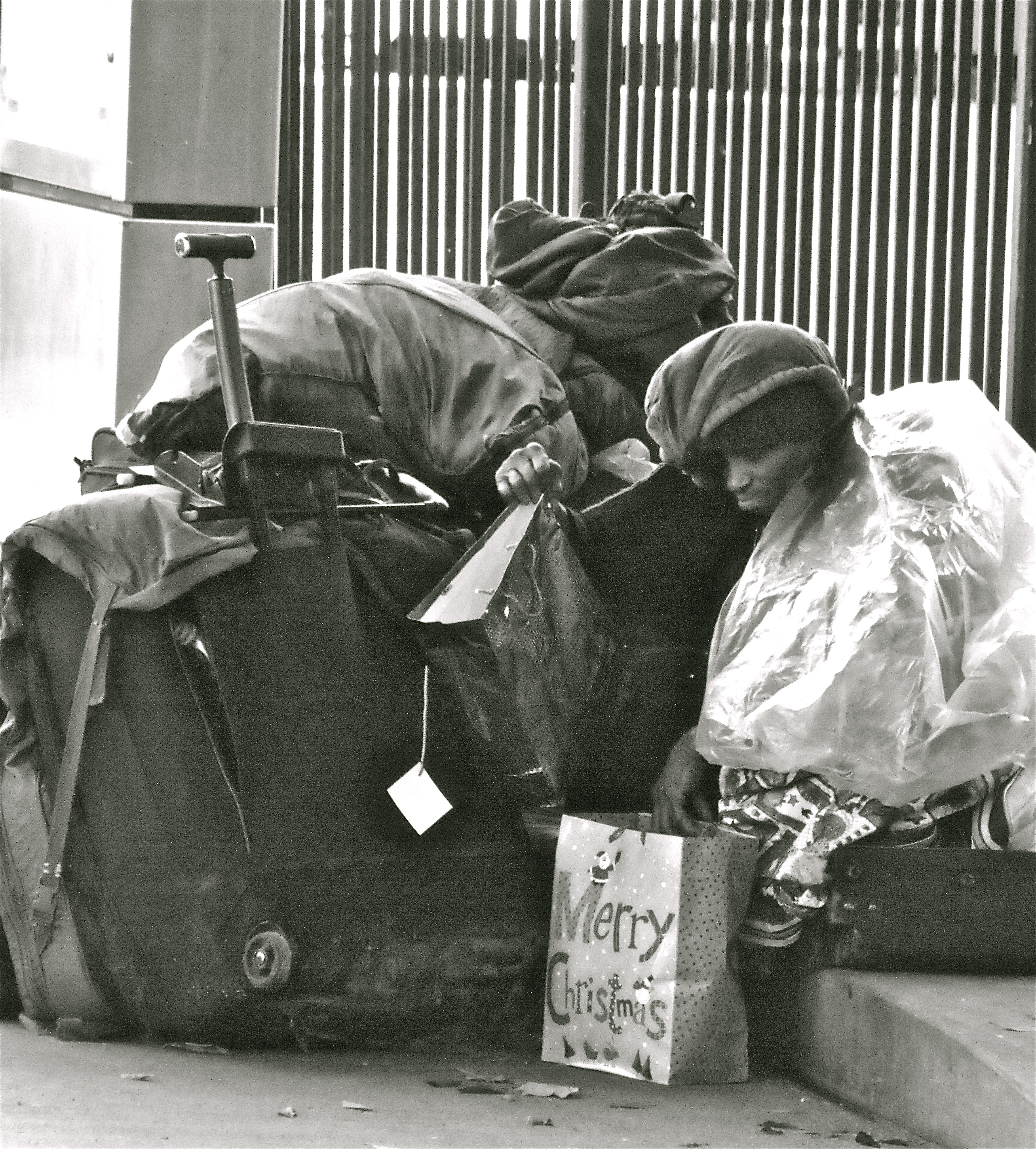
A homeless person in Los Angeles sleeps on the street, 2010

95% of those who responded to a 2019 Los Angeles Times poll called homelessness a serious or very serious problem in the city. In 2019 over 39,000 people were homeless in the city.

Despite Los Angeles having milder winters than New York City (average winter lows of 49 °F (9 °C) versus 26 °F (−3 °C)), more homeless people die of hypothermia in Los Angeles.

Rising rent and limited tenant protections are significant drivers of homelessness in Los Angeles.

In September 2006, the Los Angeles Police Department launched the Safer Cities Initiative, assigning fifty officers to clear homeless encampments downtown and to issue citations against people living outdoors. By 2015, the city was spending roughly $100 million a year on homelessness with half of this funding going to police enforcement.

In 2016, voters approved a $1.2 billion bond measure to create permanent supportive housing. However, a report from the L.A. Controller's office revealed that five years later, only 14% of the housing had been completed, at an average cost of $600,000 per unit.

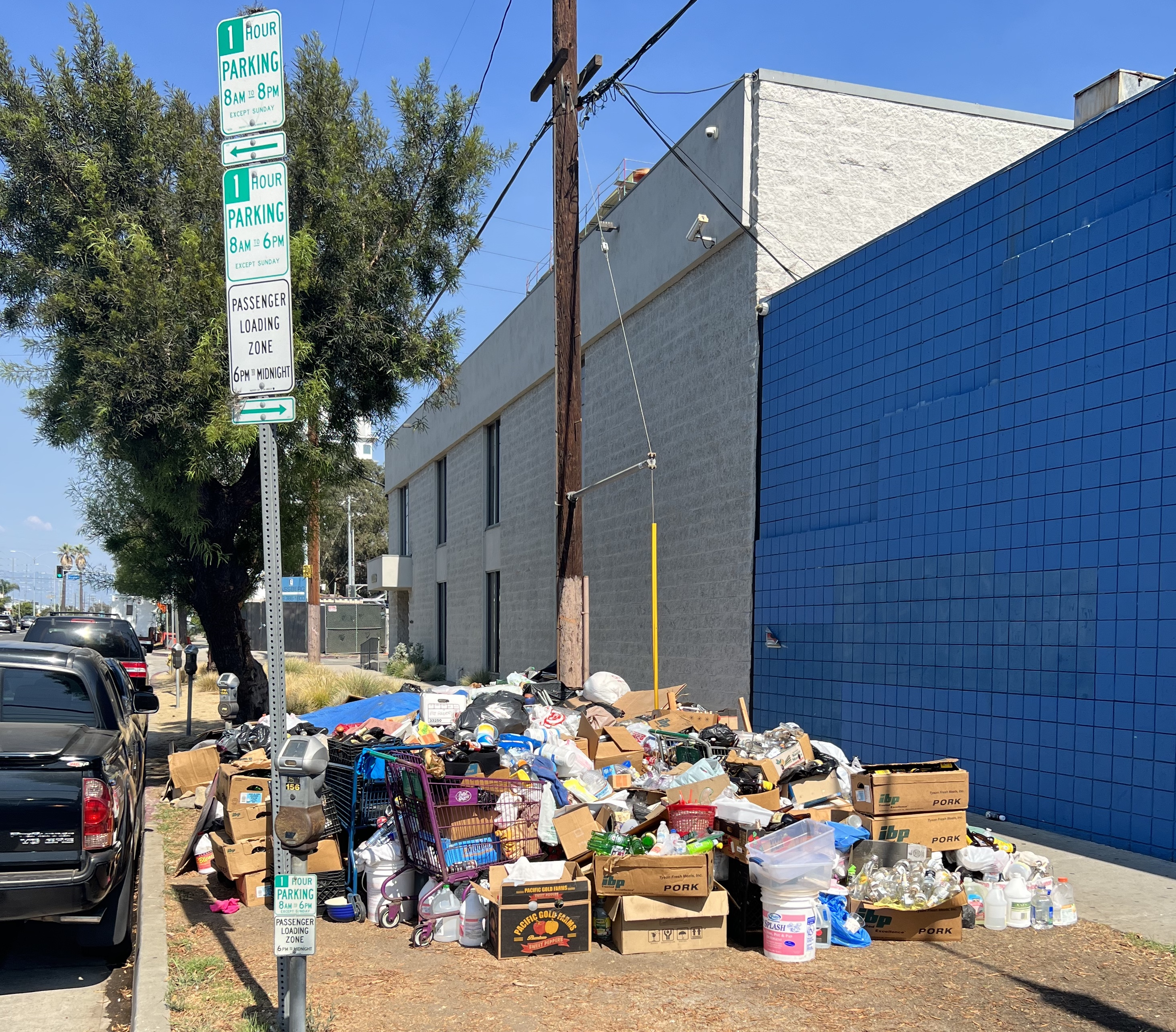
A sprawling homeless encampment in West Los Angeles, 2022

In 2022, voters approved Measure ULA, a tax on high-price real estate sales to fund affordable housing and homelessness services. The tax went into effect in 2023.

Also in 2022, the new mayor Karen Bass declared a state of emergency and issued an executive order to accelerate affordable housing and shelter development. The order requires city agencies to process related paperwork within 60 days instead of the usual six to nine months, and reduces regulatory barriers.

The New York Times reported that as of July 2025, the homeless population in Los Angeles declined for a second consecutive year.

==== City of Santa Monica ====
In 2019, Santa Monica reported mixed results in addressing homelessness: downtown areas saw a 19% decrease in homeless people, but the city's overall homeless population increased by 3%. Officials credit the downtown improvement to targeted outreach and engagement strategies. However, the Los Angeles region's housing crisis continues to drive increases in Santa Monica's homeless population.

The city provides approximately 400 emergency shelter beds and 330 permanent supportive housing units, along with an access center offering showers, mail service, and medical assistance.

==== City of Long Beach ====
Long Beach, California's seventh most populous city, reported 3,296 people experiencing homelessness in 2022—a 62% increase from 2020. In response, the city declared a state of emergency in January 2023 to streamline approval processes for homelessness-related contracts and projects.

In August 2024, Long Beach introduced a dual approach to addressing homelessness: an anti-camping ordinance that would issue misdemeanor citations to unhoused individuals, and a proposed increase in funding for motel vouchers and permanent housing and for staffing in the Department of Homeless Services and related agencies.

==== City of Norwalk ====
On August 6, 2024, the Norwalk City Council enacted an emergency moratorium blocking new shelters, single-room occupancy hotels, public housing, and transitional housing. The council justified this action under the California Housing Crisis Act of 2019, which permits local governments to ban housing facilities that pose an "imminent threat" to public health and safety. The State Department of Housing and Community Development challenged this decision, sending Mayor Rios and other officials a violation letter that called the ordinance "unlawful." The state argued that Norwalk had not demonstrated any specific threats from the banned housing types or any citywide threat. The state government filed a lawsuit in November 2024 to try to force the city to rescind the moratorium.

=== Orange County ===
Orange County's homeless population grew significantly between 2017 and 2019. The 2017 federally mandated Point in Time count counted 4,792 homeless people, and there were 193 deaths among homeless people, primarily from drug overdoses and suicides. By 2019, the count identified 6,860 homeless people in the county—2,899 in shelters and 3,961 without shelter.

=== Riverside County ===
In January 2025, Riverside County conducted its biennial Point-In-Time Count survey which confirmed 3,990 people categorized as homeless. In 2023, the survey identified 3,725 people. County officials noted that the "unsheltered" component fell by 19% from the previous 2023 survey, dropping from 2,440 to 2,050. In March 2025, the Riverside County Board of Supervisors approved $12.6 million in state funding to clear homeless encampments along the Murrieta Creek Trail.

==== City of Palm Springs ====
The City of Palm Springs has invested over $40 million for the Palm Springs Navigation Center, which can house 80 residents in private units and offers a wide array of support services. Accompanying the main facility is an Early Access Facility, with 50 overnight shelter beds. In a January 2025, a study from Riverside County Point-in-Time Count, cited a 63% decrease in its unhoused population since 2023. The city contributed the decline to its development of the Palm Springs Navigation Center.

=== San Bernardino County ===
==== City of Redlands ====
In 2021, the city of Redlands, used the state program Project Homekey to receive $30 million in funding to purchase and rehabilitate a motel, expand housing for people experiencing homelessness, or those at risk of becoming homeless. In 2023, the remodeled motel was completed with 98-units and named 'Step Up'.

=== San Diego County ===
San Diego County counted 9,160 homeless people in 2017, decreasing to 8,576 in 2018—then the fourth-highest count in the United States.

In 2023, 10,203 homeless people were counted, a 14% increase from 2022. The homeless veteran population reached 814 in 2023, rising 17% from the previous year.

In 2017, San Diego faced a public health crisis when inadequate sanitation—including insufficient handwashing stations and locked public restrooms—contributed to a Hepatitis A outbreak among the homeless population. Both San Diego County and Governor Brown declared health emergencies. The city responded by opening three emergency shelters, expected to cost $12.9 million annually to operate, and by creating a 500-bin storage center for homeless people's belongings.

==== City of San Diego ====
San Diego police officers engaged in systematic displacement of homeless people in the late 1980s. During a 1990 criminal trial, officers and supervisors testified that they regularly rounded up homeless individuals before dawn and transported them to other jurisdictions like National City or unincorporated parts of San Diego County.

In 1989, most homeless people in San Diego had no regular access to healthcare.

San Diego implemented several programs to assist its homeless population. In 2017, the city created a parking lot with restrooms and showers for people living in vehicles. In February 2019, the city repealed its ban on living in vehicles.

In 2018, San Diego adopted a "Housing First" program with a $79.7 million budget. This program funds temporary and permanent housing development, rent assistance, and incentives for landlords to rent to homeless people.

As of 2019 the city has 2,040 emergency and bridge shelters for temporary housing.

In June 2023, San Diego enacted a ban on public camping. The ordinance creates a new "3 strike" system: first-time violators receive information about available services, second offenses result in a misdemeanor citation, and third offenses can lead to arrest. General enforcement is contingent on availability of shelter space, but police may issue citations regardless of shelter availability to anyone camping close to schools, existing shelters, along train and trolley lines, and in public spaces where encampment may create a public health risk.

To address the lack of shelter beds, the city created two "safe sleeping" lots at Balboa Park's B street lot and parking lot O. The sites can accommodate between 516 and 1032 people. The sites provide their own tents as well as bathrooms, showers, meals, assistance to additional housing services, and 24-hour security. Residents may bring domestic pets such as cats and dogs.

==== City of Escondido ====
In 2023, The Regional Task Force on Homelessness counted 304 homeless people in Escondido. In February 2024, the Escondido City Council voted 4–1 to reject state and county "Housing First" initiatives, choosing instead to implement its own "public safety first" strategy.

==== City of Oceanside ====
In April 2024, California awarded $11.4 million to Oceanside and Carlsbad through the Interagency Council on Homelessness. The funding aims to provide services and housing to approximately 350 people camping along the Highway 78 corridor. In August 2024, Oceanside received $6.1 million of the grant, while Carlsbad received $5.3 million.

In October 2024, the Oceanside City Council modified its homeless encampment ordinances. The new rules eliminate the requirement to offer shelter space or motel vouchers before enforcing public camping bans. The changes also allow police to remove encampments regardless of shelter bed availability and reduce the removal notice period for large encampments from 48 to 24 hours.

=== Sacramento County ===
==== City of Sacramento ====
In August 2019, the city of Sacramento filed a lawsuit against seven transients accused of theft, drugs, assaults, and having weapons. The lawsuit seeks to exclude them from the business corridor around Land Park and Curtis Park.

=== The San Francisco Bay Area ===
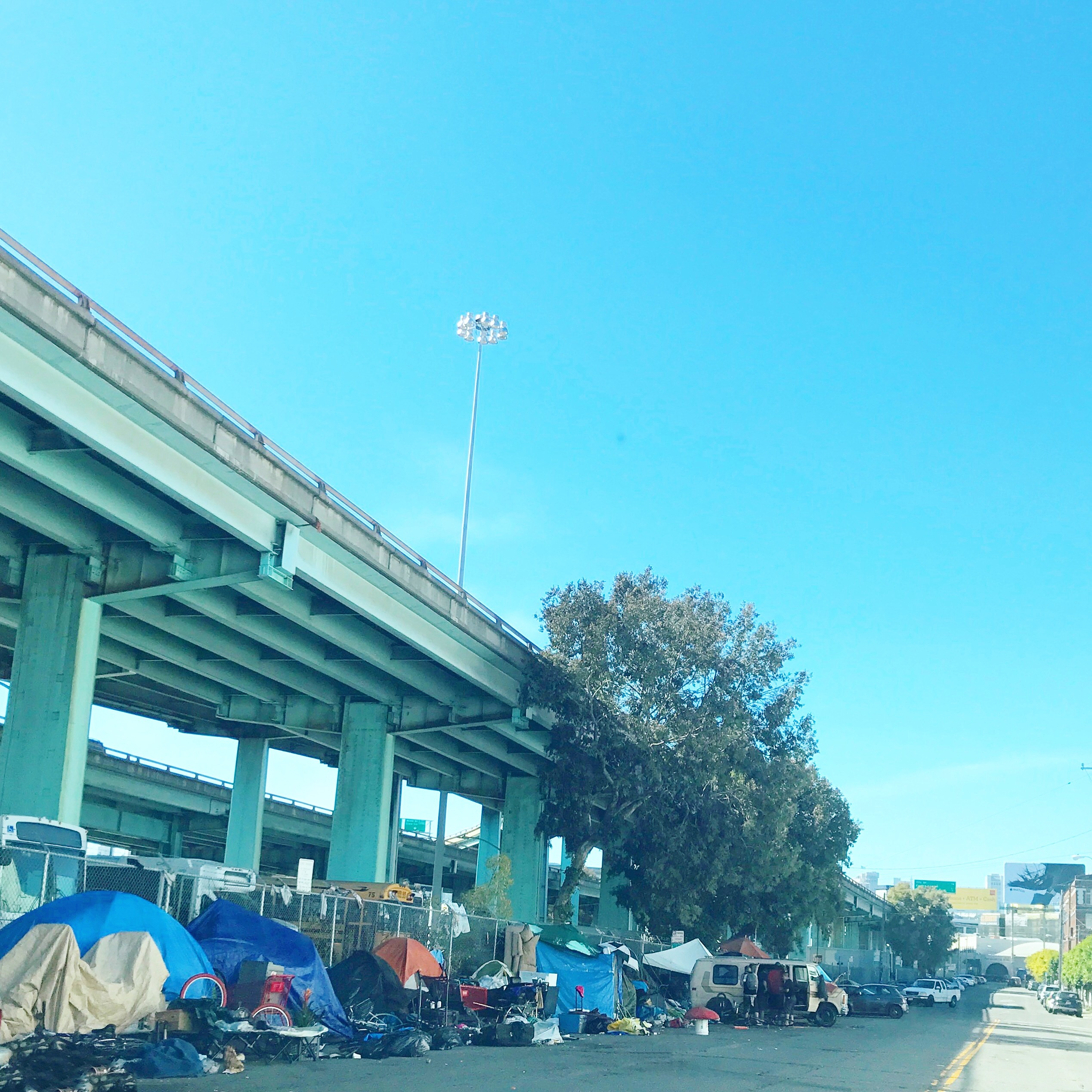
A homeless camp in San Francisco, 2017

San Francisco has a significant and visible homelessness problem, with an estimated 7,000 to 10,000 people experiencing homelessness.

Most of them—61%—became homeless while living and working in San Francisco. Many avoid shelters due to concerns about violence and discrimination. The city offers only 1,339 shelter beds.

San Francisco spends $200 million a year on homelessness-related programs. On May 3, 2004, San Francisco adopted the "Care Not Cash" plan, which however proved disappointing. In 2010, a city ordinance was passed to forbid sitting and lying down on public sidewalks for most of the day.

Between 2005 and 2017, San Francisco's "Homeward Bound" program sent 10,500 homeless people out of town by bus. A 2019 New York Times article reported that many bus ticket recipients were missing, unreachable, in jail, or homeless within a month after leaving San Francisco, and one out of eight returned to the city within a year.

An October 2018 report by the United Nations Special Rapporteur on the Right to Adequate Housing said that "cruel and inhuman" conditions for homeless people in the Bay Area violate human rights, which include "access to water, sanitation and health services, and other basic necessities." Farha's fact-finding mission found conditions in homeless encampments rivaling the most impoverished neighborhoods in Mumbai, Delhi, and Mexico City. She urged the Bay Area to provide more affordable housing.

A proposition was enacted by voters in 2018 (Proposition C) to apply a tax to the gross receipts of San Francisco's largest companies. The revenue from the tax would add up to $300 million a year to the city's homelessness budget (doubling it). It would also fund shelters, mental health services, addiction treatment, and homelessness prevention. It survived legal challenges and went into effect in 2020.

=== San Luis Obispo County ===
The SLO County Board of Supervisors approved a "10 Year Plan to End Homelessness" to begin in January 2008, "aimed at ending homelessness in ten years." According to the 2008 point in time count, 850 people in the county were homeless then. After ten years, that number had risen to 1,483.

In 2022, the County approved another five-year plan ("The San Luis Obispo Countywide Plan to Address Homelessness"). As the title suggests, this plan is more modest in its aspirations: "to reduce the number of people experiencing homelessness to 50% of the current level within five years."

There is one day center and two overnight emergency shelter options in San Luis Obispo County. These represent enough beds for 20–30% of those who are known to be homeless on any particular night. In part because of this shortage of shelter, the county has the third highest percentage of unsheltered homelessness among "largely suburban" counties in the United States.

In its Point-in-Time census counts, SLO County artificially reduces the apparent number of unsheltered homeless people. It opens its warming centers, which are usually open only during extreme weather, for the one night before the count. Homeless people who would otherwise count as unsheltered are then counted as sheltered if they stay in the warming center that night. For example, in 2024, 375 homeless people in SLO County were officially counted as "sheltered", but 48 of these (13%) were sheltered only for the night before the count.

San Luis Obispo County is coextensive with the CA-614 "Continuum of Care" (CoC) district. In the 2024 point in time count:

- 8% of homeless people surveyed in that district were under the age of 18, 4% were 18–24, 15% 25–34, 23% 35–44, 22% 45–54, 20% 55–66, and 9% 65 or older.
- Among the homeless surveyed were 43 families with children. In addition there were 28 "unaccompanied children."
- 42.9% said that they were experiencing homelessness for the first time
- 24% met the definition of "chronically homeless". Of those, 80% were unsheltered.
- 46 were military veterans
- 30% of those surveyed reported having at least one disabling condition (defined as "a developmental disability, HIV/AIDS, or a long-term physical or mental impairment that impacts a person's ability to live independently but could be improved with stable housing."). 46% had post-traumatic stress disorder. 23% had experienced traumatic brain injury. 11% were developmentally disabled.

San Luis Obispo County is one of the least affordable housing markets in the country. Two of its cities (San Luis Obispo and Santa Maria) appear in the top ten cities in the U.S., ranked by how much income you must have to afford to buy a home, in a 2025 report. In each of those cities, you would need about three times the median household income there to afford to buy a home.

=== Santa Barbara County ===
Rising rent and property prices force hundreds of middle-class people, including teachers, chefs, and nurses, to live out of their cars. In 2017, a survey counted 1,489 homeless people. 44 homeless people died in Santa Barbara County in 2016.

=== Ventura County ===
Ventura County's homeless population reached 1,299 people in 2018, according to the Ventura County Continuum of Care Alliance board. The county's unsheltered population increased by 24%.

==== City of Ventura ====
The City of Ventura specifically saw a double-digit rise in homelessness from 2016 to 2017, and 63 homeless people died. Ventura residents have placed pressure on city leaders to do more about the growing homelessness problem.

== Impacts ==
Homelessness impacts homeless people, but also other aspects of society.

=== Environmental ===
A 2021 Los Angeles Times investigation revealed that more than 54 percent of all fires requiring an LAFD response were associated with homelessness. Most are unintentional, resulting from the use of open-flame cooking equipment or campfires near tents and other flammable materials. Until June 2024, the city could not prohibit unhoused people from performing vital activities like cooking, and attempts to remove encampments from high-risk areas had been blocked by the United States Court of Appeals for the Ninth Circuit, which had ruled that the city was obligated to provide housing for the residents of a removed encampment.

About a third of homeless-related fires are classed as arson by the LAFD. The LAFD only forwards arson cases to the Police Department for investigation when there is significant property damage or when they believe the victim was being targeted. Thus, very few homeless-related arsons are prosecuted. The problem of homeless-related fires becomes more grave with each passing year:

- In 2021, Los Angeles had, on average, 24 homeless-related fires every day (more than 54% of all fires).
- In 2024, Los Angeles had, on average, 46 homeless-related fires every day.

=== Economic ===
Homelessness is costly, impacting the economy and taxpayers. A 2023 report found that California spent almost $10 billion in three years on homelessness. While some of the money was traced to the funding of services, the state lost the money trail for a majority of it.

A 2015 report in Los Angeles found that more than 15 agencies, some of which had departments that incurred major costs, engaged consistently with homeless populations. In California, the average cost to hospitals for treating a patient with substance use issues is $8,300 for individuals in treatment and $14,740 for individuals who are not. Santa Clara County spent 53% of their homeless service budget on health care, 34% on justice system related costs, and 13% on social welfare. As of 2012, the average annual public cost per unhoused individual was $5,148.

== See also ==
- Homelessness in the United States by state
