= Mayfair Hotel (Los Angeles) =

Historic hotel in Los Angeles, California

Coordinates: 34°03′08″N 118°16′03″W

- U.S. National Register of Historic Places
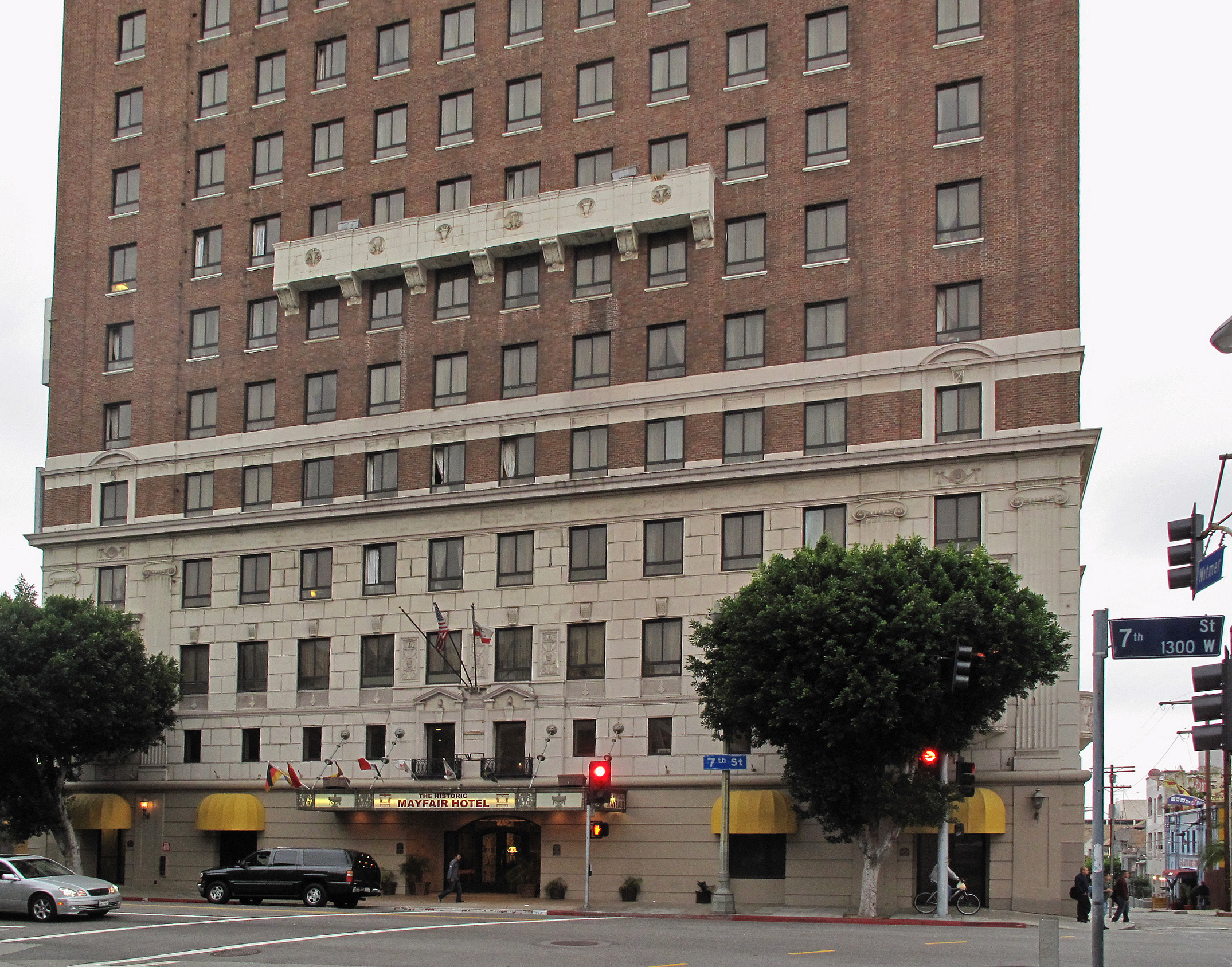
- The hotel's exterior in 2012
- Location: 1256 W. 7th Street; Los Angeles, California; United States
- Built: 1926
- Architect: Curlett & Beelman
- Architectural style: Renaissance Revival
- NRHP reference No.: 100006295
- Added to NRHP: March 18, 2021

The Mayfair Hotel is a historic hotel in the Westlake neighborhood of Los Angeles, California. The Sun Realty Company commissioned the building in 1926 and architectural firm Curlett & Beelman designed it in the Renaissance Revival style. The hotel opened on February 1, 1927. It closed in 2020 and was converted to homeless housing.

== History ==
The Sun Realty Company commissioned the Mayfair Hotel on 7th Street in the Westlake neighborhood in Los Angeles in 1926, designed by Curlett & Beelman and built at a cost of US$2,500,000 (equivalent to $43,000,000 in 2023). The company constructed the Mayfair at the same time as two of its other projects, the Roosevelt Building at 7th and Flower and the Chester Williams Building at 5th and Broadway. At 15 stories tall, promoters advertised the building as the tallest west of the Mississippi.

The hotel opened on February 1, 1927, with a banquet for hotel industry members. The dinner event featured live music from the Rainbow Isle Orchestra and inaugural manager J. J. Hernan hosted the preview event for local journalists. The Los Angeles Daily Times described the Mayfair as "commanding an unusually beautiful view of the city, the mountains and the Hollywood area" and noted that it was located "only a short ride from Broadway, yet out of the congested traffic district".

On May 16, 1929, the Mayfair hosted the afterparty of the 1st Academy Awards.

The hotel was operated by Western Hotels from October 1, 1949 to October 10, 1960.

On September 13, 1957, it hosted the first ever meeting of Gamblers Anonymous, a group of just fourteen people.

In 2014, property owner ICO Group of Companies began a renovation of the Mayfair Hotel, with architect Gulla Jonsdottir providing designs for the project. On July 10, 2018, the hotel reopened under the management of Crescent Hotels and Resorts with nightly rates starting at $185. The renovated hotel also featured several new restaurants.

The hotel closed in 2020, due to the COVID-19 pandemic, and was converted to a homeless shelter, through Project Roomkey, which placed unhoused residents in hotels left empty due to the pandemic.

On August 18, 2023, the Los Angeles City Council voted 12 to 2 in favor of Mayor Karen Bass's proposal to purchase the Mayfair Hotel and use it as interim housing for homeless people in the city. The city's plan included $60 million in funds for the purchase of the property and an additional $23 million for upgrades.

== See also ==
- National Register of Historic Places listings in Los Angeles
