= California Proposition 13 =

California Proposition 13 may refer to:

- 1978 California Proposition 13, People's Initiative to Limit Property Taxation
- 2010 California Proposition 13, Seismic Retrofitting
- 2020 California Proposition 13, Public Preschool, K-12, and College Health and Safety Bond Act

== See also ==
- California ballot proposition, a referendum or initiative submitted to the California electorate for a vote
- List of California ballot propositions
