= Project Roomkey =

California COVID-19 homeless housing program

Project Roomkey is a federally (FEMA) funded homeless relief initiative in the state of California. The program was launched in April 2020.

The project was expected to end in late 2020, as it was initially intended to help homeless people socially distance during the peak of the pandemic. However for a time it was continued and was expanded in March 2021 with the Los Angeles City Council approving a measure that would allow the city to compel hotel owners to participate in the program even if they did not want to.

National publications such as Newsweek have noted that the program is reserved for homeless individuals aged 65 or older or who have an underlying medical condition. As of March 22, 2021, LA County had counted 48,038 unsheltered people, 15,000 rooms promised, 2,261 rooms under contract, 2,261 rooms operational and 1,724 rooms occupied. By these numbers, 28% of the operational rooms being paid for remain unoccupied, the county has made 15% of the goal of 15,000 rooms operational, and the program has successfully addressed temporary housing for 3.6% of the county's homeless population. As of March 4, 2021, $59 million had been spent on the project.

On March 1, 1672 rooms were occupied. The cost of the program averages out by these numbers to $35,308 per room over 10 months or roughly $117 per room, per day. The actual per day cost would come to more than this average due to actual occupancy being lower than the cumulative totals.

By October 2020, the program that was launched in April 2020 had only found permanent housing for 5% of those in the temporary housing.

The program is intended to operate only during the pandemic. The state intends to transition residents out of the program at the end of the pandemic.

== Phasing out and winding down the program ==
At its peak the program operated in 37 properties such as hotels and motels in Los Angeles alone. By July 2022, as the pandemic had passed its peak, only five properties in Los Angeles remained active in the program. By May 2023, only two motels were still participating in the program in Sacramento County, with one expected to close permanently on June 30 and the other in October. Residents participating in the program were supposed to be provided with options for more permanent housing, but in both Los Angeles and Sacramento, people reported that only a small percentage of those housed through the program had found longer term accommodations. For example, Project Roomkey provided the participants in one motel, soon to close, with a list of 148 phone numbers of landlords said to offer affordable housing options. Upon contacting the landlords, the Sacramento Bee learned that only three of the 148 landlords actually had housing available, with two of those three imposing significant restrictions on prospective tenants, and the third having a few units available. Many of the landlords had waiting lists far too long to be practical for residents facing urgent eviction from the temporary accommodations provided through Project Roomkey.

== Transition into Homekey ==
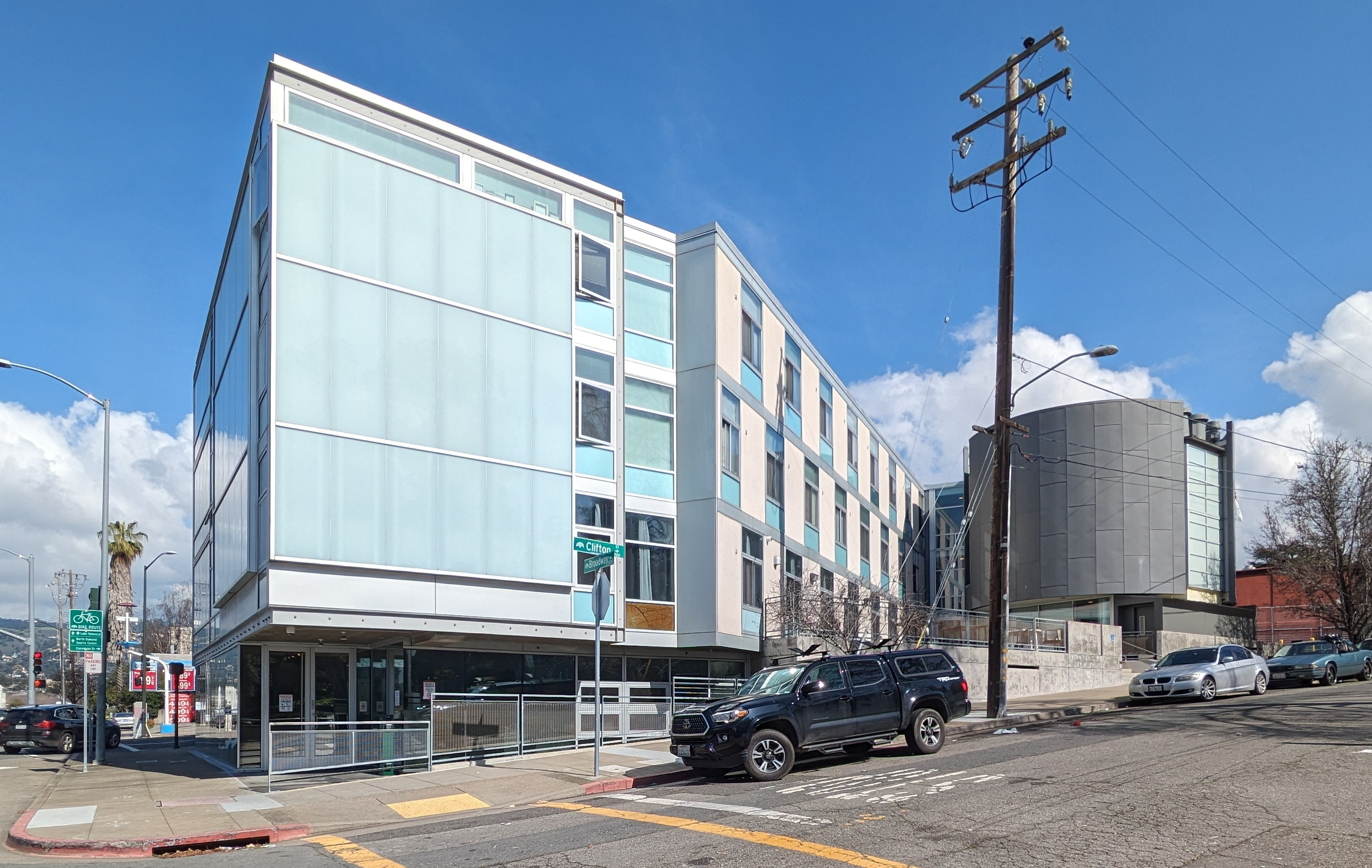
Clifton Hall, a former dormitory at California College of the Arts, was bought by the city of Oakland using Homekey funds and converted to public housing for people experiencing homelessness.

After roughly three months of existence, the state government saw an opportunity to transition Project Roomkey into a more permanent measure. On July 16, 2020, California Governor Newsom made Homekey known to the public by announcing that regional governments in California could begin applying for Homekey grants of up to $600 million. These grants would help local governments acquire motels, hotels, along with other large properties to create permanent housing for homeless individuals. In the first 6 months of Homekey's existence, the state was able to own 94 properties all over different areas of California. In July 2021, Governor Newsom announced that $2.75 billion dollars would be added to the funding of Project Homekey.

As of 2023, the project has a maximum spending limit of $200,000 per housing unit, and alongside this, there is a 8-month deadline from the moment federal funding is received by these local agencies to when they spend that money on these housing units. The state government believes that by doing so, the project can be both cost-effective and efficient.

Since July 2020, Project Homekey has funded 14,040 homes across the state, in 231 projects. Alongside this, they have a projected goal of 142,074 households to be served over the full lifetime of Project Homekey.

On November 15, 2023, it was announced by the Department of Housing and Community Development that an additional $114 million in funding would be provided to the third phase of Project Homekey, ensuring that the project's operations continue.
