= Timeslip =

British children's TV sci-fi series (1970–1971)

- Genre: Science fiction Children's television
- Developed by: Ruth Boswell; James Boswell
- Presented by: Peter Fairley
- Starring: Cheryl Burfield; Spencer Banks; Denis Quilley; Iris Russell; Derek Benfield
- Theme music composer: Edouard Michael
- Opening theme: "Rite de la Terre"
- Ending theme: "Rite de la Terre"
- Country of origin: United Kingdom
- Original language: English
- No. of series: 1
- No. of episodes: 26

Production
- Producer: John Cooper
- Camera setup: Multi-camera
- Running time: c. 25 minutes per episode
- Production company: ATV

Original release
- Network: ITV
- Release: 28 September 1970 – 22 March 1971

Timeslip is a British children's science fiction television series made by ATV for the ITV network, and broadcast in 1970 and 1971. It was first shown on Monday evenings at around 5:15-5:20pm, beginning on 28 September 1970, in all ITV regions, apart from Thames (London) and Southern which broadcast the series the following Friday.

== Overview ==
What is a Time Bubble? You can't see it, of course, but it might help you visualise it to think of a balloon... Supposing some little patch of information – some little patch of history – gets slowed down, and instead of flashing backwards and forwards it floats, gently, as if in a bubble... Supposing you could get into that bubble – that bubble of history – and travel with it. Then you could move forwards and backwards in time at will...

— Introduction by Peter Fairley, Timeslip: "The Time of the Ice Box", episode 1

The series is centred on two children, Simon Randall (Spencer Banks) and Liz Skinner (Cheryl Burfield), who discover a strange anomaly, known as the Time Barrier, which enables them to travel in time, and visit the past as well as alternative futures. The time barrier, which operates in a field at a disused military base, moves the children not only through time but also through space: for example, they travel from St Oswald's in the UK in 1940 to the Antarctic in one projection of 1990.

The children have contrasting personalities: Simon is studious, but Liz is something of a crybaby. This often leads to conflict, but as the series progresses, their antagonism matures into a deep bond of friendship.

The main theme of the series is the way humankind uses and abuses science and technology, and tends to support the idea that the pursuit of scientific knowledge and advancement leads to the depersonalisation of individuals and the abandonment of moral principles. A secondary theme, explored in the instances where Liz and Simon encounter potential future versions of themselves, is the extent to which an individual can change, or be changed, depending on the situations he or she encounters.

=== List of serials ===
No.	Title	No. Episodes	Writer(s)	Director(s)	Airdate
1	"The Wrong End of Time"	6	Bruce Stewart	John Cooper	28 September 1970 – 2 November 1970
2	"The Time of the Ice Box"	6	Bruce Stewart	Peter Jefferies	9 November 1970 – 14 December 1970
3	"The Year of the Burn Up"	8	Bruce Stewart (episodes 1–7); Victor Pemberton (episode 8)	Ron Francis	21 December 1970 – 8 February 1971
4	"The Day of the Clone"	6	Victor Pemberton	David Foster (episodes 1–4); Ron Francis (episodes 5–6)	15 February 1971 – 22 March 1971

=== Summary ===
==== The Wrong End of Time ====
Simon, whose mother has recently died, has been taken on holiday in 1970 by the Skinner family – father Frank (Derek Benfield), mother Jean (Iris Russell) and daughter Liz – to the village of St Oswald. Frank had served at the (now abandoned) naval research base in St Oswald during World War II, where he had suffered amnesia. This has left him with no recollection of what happened during his time there. A local girl, Sarah, disappears through an invisible time barrier, witnessed by a local man, but nobody believes him when he tells the story in the pub where the Skinners are staying; but his story attracts a man called Charles Traynor (Denis Quilley), who arrives in the village and reveals that he was Skinner's commanding officer at the base during the war. Traynor had ordered Skinner to destroy the apparatus which the scientists at the base were working on, and he is eager to learn from Skinner if he succeeded in the task. This is because a German expeditionary team attacked and took over the base for a short time in 1940. The German commander, Gottfried (Sandor Elès), is now a prominent scientist, kidnapped and forced to work on the other side of the Iron Curtain, and Traynor is concerned that if the research work done at the base had fallen into his hands, it could be used against the West. While out playing near the ruins of the naval base, Liz and Simon encounter the Time Barrier for the first time. They are transported back to 1940, to the very day the Germans took over the base. There they encounter both Traynor, who is commander of the base, and Liz's father, a young naval recruit (played by John Alkin). A link is maintained to the present via Liz's mother, who is able to communicate telepathically with her daughter. After crossing the Time Barrier, Liz and Simon encounter Sarah, the teenage girl who fell through the barrier, and help her return to the present day. When the Germans arrive, Liz and Simon are initially captured, but then escape and succeed in helping young Frank Skinner carry out Traynor's orders to destroy the secret apparatus – a prototype laser weapon – before the Germans can seize it. They escape back through the Time Barrier, but instead of returning to St Oswald in their time of 1970, they find themselves in an icy wilderness.

During their experience in 1940, Liz is shot yet the bullet does not harm her, which seems to confirm Traynor's advice to Liz's parents (in 1970) that the children are not actually in any danger from the time travel because they are only hallucinating about it and the past cannot harm them.

==== The Time of the Ice Box ====
The icy wilderness is revealed to be Antarctica in the year 1990. Liz and Simon are rescued from the ice and brought to a research base – the International Institute for Biological Research, nicknamed the "Ice Box" - headed by Morgan C. Devereaux (John Barron). Liz and Simon manage to escape and return to the present time, but only just after Liz believes she has seen her mother in the Ice Box. In the present, Traynor is amazed to learn of Devereaux's presence in the future; he had been a student of Devereaux's and believed he had died in 1969. Using Simon's curiosity about these events, Traynor persuades the children to return to the Ice Box and Liz is stunned when she encounters first her mother, and then her future self, a cold and emotionless scientist going by the name Beth (Mary Preston), working in the Ice Box. The staff of the Ice Box are conducting controlled experiments on human volunteers, including tests of a longevity drug called HA57. A catalogue of failures has been plaguing the research effort, but Devereaux refuses to entertain the possibility that the base computer is making errors. The failures get worse, and Devereaux's behaviour becomes more and more erratic. Liz and Simon learn that Devereaux is a clone of the original Devereaux, the first in the world. Investigating further, Liz and Simon discover that the purpose of the computer is to create a new clone of Devereaux. This is so that the formula for the longevity drug, which is known only to Devereaux and not written down, can be preserved and kept secret. Liz discovers to her horror and disgust that her father Frank is also in the Ice Box, but has been buried under the ice for ten years as part of an experiment, but the experiment fails when the Ice Box temperature controls fail. The Ice Box researchers confront Devereaux, attempting to convince him that the computer is malfunctioning. Devereaux is unable to accept his failing and, suffering a mental breakdown, escapes out into the Antarctic ice. As the computer fails, the base begins to freeze over. The staff, including Jean and Beth, each take a dose of an anti-freeze formula in the hope of surviving the cold until rescue arrives. Liz and Simon depart; as they approach the Time Barrier, they discover the frozen body of Devereaux.

==== The Year of the Burn Up ====
The Time Barrier returns Simon and Liz to 1970. Traynor warns them not to use the Time Barrier again. Determined to prevent the future of the Ice Box that they have witnessed, and curious as to what Traynor is afraid they might discover, they disobey him and once more enter the Time Barrier. Once again, they end up in 1990, but in an alternate future from that of the Ice Box. In this future, England is covered in tropical rainforest. Once again, Liz encounters her future self, Beth (once more played by Mary Preston). This time, however, she is a hippy Earth mother type who has rebelled against the technocracy that rules this future world, and lives in a primitive village with similar misfits. Simon also encounters his future self – a technocrat known as Controller 2957 (David Graham), charged with implementing the Master Plan intended to reshape the Earth to the benefit of humankind. The Master Plan had originally been devised in 1970 by Traynor. However, 2957 has since usurped him, and now Traynor, who is still alive in 1990, is determined to wreak his revenge. Traynor sabotages the computer managing the Master Plan. His interference ruins the Earth's climate, causing global temperatures to soar and leading to an environmental collapse of devastating proportions. Beth aids Liz and Simon in returning through the Time Barrier before heading for the safety of some caves with the misfits and 2957, who has seen the error of his ways, where there is water and they might stand a chance of survival.

==== The Day of the Clone ====
The final serial ties together many of the elements of the previous serials. Believing that Beth needs her help, Liz attempts to return to 1990 via the Time Barrier, but is kidnapped by Traynor. Simon goes looking for Liz and tracks her to R1, a secret research establishment under Traynor's command, that is located at St. Oswald's and next to the Time Barrier. The children learn that R1 was established by Morgan C. Devereaux to research into the longevity drug – HA57 – that the children previously encountered in the Ice Box. They break out of R1 and, with Traynor in pursuit, they make their escape through the Time Barrier, which transports them to the year 1965. Realising that Devereaux would have been alive in this time, they return to R1. There the children learn that R1 is not only researching longevity, but also cloning. Devereaux believes that for the cloning and longevity process to be a success, subjects must also undergo psychological reconditioning, but Traynor, who is working at R1 as the Government's representative, disagrees, believing that Devereaux is turning the volunteer subjects into brainwashed puppets. When Traynor threatens to shut down R1, Devereaux has him detained and replaced by a clone. Devereaux's experiments fail and the young people Simon and Liz encounter at R1 in 1965, they meet again in 1970 only now they are all very old men and women on the point of dying. Simon realises that it is Devereaux who is the source of the dystopian futures they have witnessed, and that the Traynor they know has been a clone all along. The Time Barrier created a clone projection of Devereaux in the Ice Box in the hope that the children could return a working formula for HA57 to the Traynor clone in 1970. The Traynor clone is also a projection of the Time Barrier, charged with implementing Devereaux's vision of the future: the catastrophic Master Plan that will lead to the "Burn Up". Returning to 1970, Liz and Simon discover the real Traynor, locked up in a secret room in R1 since 1965. The children and the real Traynor confront the clone Traynor at the Time Barrier at St Oswald. Traynor tells the clone that he does not exist, that he is a projection. As the clone nears the Barrier, an invisible force grabs him and he disappears into the Time Barrier. Liz and Simon return to their families, leaving the real Traynor alone.

== Production ==
Timeslip was devised by ATV script editor Ruth Boswell, who developed the format and the outline of the first story with her husband James. Its development was instigated by ATV producer Renee Goddard, who wanted to produce a programme that could challenge the popularity among children of the BBC's science fiction series Doctor Who (1963–89; 1996; 2005–present). Boswell was determined to come up with a show that was rooted more firmly in everyday life than Doctor Who, which at the time she felt had become progressively more outlandish. Much of the show's time travel concepts were based on the book An Experiment with Time by J. W. Dunne. However, in order to give the series as authentic a veneer as possible, Geoffrey Hoyle, son of physicist Fred Hoyle and a noted science fiction author in his own right, gave his advice regarding how time travel might be possible. In addition, the opening episodes of the first two serials - "The Wrong End of Time" and "The Time of the Ice Box" - were introduced by Peter Fairley, who was science correspondent for ITN.

The plot of the first serial, "The Wrong End of Time", was inspired by an – initially apocryphal (but according to some accounts confirmed after remaining a State Secret for more than 70 years) – story of a German Expeditionary Force that landed in Britain to carry out a raid on an Isle of Wight radar station in 1940 (or 1943), during World War II. The later stories were inspired by ecological concerns that were beginning to make headlines at the time – this has led to Jeff Arnold in the telefantasy journal Timescreen to draw parallels between Timeslip and the similarly inspired adult drama series Doomwatch (1970–72). This view was echoed by an article in TV Zone magazine, which noted that Timeslip "was probably the general public's first introduction to what are now everyday scientific concepts, such as cloning and climate change".

Although Boswell originally conceived Timeslip as a single-story six-part serial, the concept was soon expanded into a much longer series of 26 episodes. New Zealander Bruce Stewart, who had adapted various science fiction short stories for the anthology series Out of this World (1962) and Out of the Unknown (1965–71), was tasked with developing Boswell's outline into scripts. Eighteen of the scripts were written by Stewart, before pressure of other work meant that Stewart had to move on, and the final serial, "The Day of the Clone", was written by Victor Pemberton. Pemberton is also credited with the script of the final episode of "The Year of the Burn Up", which acts as a bridge into "The Day of the Clone". Pemberton had previously served as script editor of Doctor Who and had penned the serial Fury from the Deep.

The iconic opening titles for the series, using 3D lettering altered for each of the four stories. The light source moving round the letters to give shadows reminiscent of a sun dial. A standard 2D graphic of the same type face was used for the "End of Part One", "Part Two" and the closing credit captions in all four stories. In all cases, there was no consistency in the way the letter 'I' was arranged. It varied for each use, providing inconsistent 'logos' for the programme name. The first story's typeface used Westminster, a typeface designed for Westminster Bank to be used on cheques as it is easily recognisable by optical character recognition.

Timeslip was recorded mainly in studio. The most notable location used was that of the Ministry Field where Liz and Simon discover the Time Barrier – this was in fact the Burnt Farm Army Camp near Goff's Oak, Hertfordshire. The effect of the children passing through the Time Barrier was achieved by way of a simple split screen effect.

A sequel series was mooted, but was not made, as John Cooper felt that the idea had run its natural course. Additionally, the series went well over budget, and the potential for sales of the series was lost because some episodes were made in black-and-white.

Victor Pemberton acquired the rights to Timeslip in the early 1990s, intending to produce either a re-make or sequel series. Nothing came of this attempt, however.

== Cast and crew ==
Cheryl Burfield, who played Liz Skinner, had begun her career as a child model. For her audition as Liz, she dressed in trousers and sported a pigtail to emphasise the tomboy nature of the character – an image that stuck for the duration of the series. The character of Liz was originally written as a 13-year-old; however, when the 18-year-old Burfield was cast, Liz's age was upped to 15.

Timeslip was the first major television role for Spencer Banks, who played Simon Randall. Unlike his co-star, no change was needed to the age of his character; even though he was 15 at the time, he was able to pass as younger. Regarding the age difference between the two, Banks recalled that on their first meeting Cheryl Burfield remarked that she looked "positively matronly beside him". However, over the course of production, Banks grew and matured and his voice broke. Banks went on to star in the children's series Tightrope (1972) (made by the same team behind Timeslip) and The Georgian House (1976). He also starred in the highly acclaimed TV drama Penda's Fen (1974) by David Rudkin.

In 2015, Banks and Burfield played characters called Rev. Simon Randall and Liz Randall in The Amityville Playhouse.

Denis Quilley went on to become a leading figure in the National Theatre and was awarded the O.B.E. He died in 2003.

Iris Russell was best known for her role as Matron Stevenson in Emergency - Ward 10 (1957–67) and appeared in the role of "Father" in The Avengers episode "Stay Tuned" (1969).

Derek Benfield later went on to appear in regular roles in The Brothers (1972–76) and Hetty Wainthropp Investigates (1996–98). He also enjoyed a successful career as a playwright. He died in 2009.

David Graham (Controller 2957/Simon Randall) was a regular voice artist in the Gerry Anderson Century 21 Supermarionation series. He voiced Parker, Brains and Gordon Tracy as well as others in Thunderbirds; also voicing characters in Stingray, Fireball XL5, Four Feather Falls, The Secret Service and Supercar. He appeared in Doctor Who in the stories The Gunfighters and City of Death, in addition to voicing Daleks in several episodes.

Ian Fairbairn (Alpha 4 and Doctor Frazer) had minor roles on Doctor Who, including the Patrick Troughton stories The Macra Terror and The Invasion, Inferno with Jon Pertwee and Tom Baker's The Seeds of Doom, the latter three directed by Douglas Camfield.

Continuing Cast:

- Simon Randall: Spencer Banks
- Liz Skinner: Cheryl Burfield
- Frank Skinner: Derek Benfield
- Jean Skinner: Iris Russell
- Commander Charles Traynor: Denis Quilley

The Wrong End of Time:

- Frank: John Alkin
- Gottfried: Sandor Elès
- Graz: Paul Humpoletz
- Arthur Griffiths: John Garrie
- George Bradley: Royston Tickner
- Ferris: Peter Sproule
- Phipps: John Abbott
- Dr. Fordyce: Kenneth Watson
- Alice Fortune: Virginia Balfour
- Sarah: Sally Templer
- German Sailor: Hilary Minster

The Time of the Ice Box:

- Morgan C. Devereaux: John Barron
- Beth: Mary Preston
- Dr. Bukov: John Barcroft
- Dr. Edith Joynton: Peggy Thorpe-Bates
- Larry: Robert Oates

The Year of the Burn Up:

- Beth: Mary Preston
- 2957: David Graham
- Miss Stebbins/Alpha 16: Teresa Scoble
- Alpha 17: Lisa Scoble
- Vera: Merdel Jordine
- Paul: Brian Pettifer
- Alpha 4: Ian Fairbairn
- Delta 22: Patrick Durkin

The Day of the Clone:

- Morgan C. Devereaux: John Barron
- Dr. Frazer: Ian Fairbairn
- Dr. Pitman: John Swindells
- Miss Stebbins: Teresa Scoble
- Maria: Mary Larkin
- De Seram: Derek Sydney
- Dr. Ferguson: Keith Grenville
- Mr. Randall: John Cazabon
- George Pointer: Richard Thorp
- Desk Attendant: Bruce Beeby
- Ward Sister: Hilary Liddell
- Commissionaire: Harry Davis
- Driver: Dennis Balcombe
- News Vendor: John Herrington

Ruth Boswell went on to adapt Catherine Storr's novel Marianne Dreams, as the children's television serial Escape Into Night (1972) and produced the first season of The Tomorrow People (1973–79; 1992–95).

== Critical reception ==
Reviewing the first episode in The Stage, John Lawrence said, "I always feel wary of programmes that are announced as "science fiction" since too often the description is applied to something that uses wild and improbable events to jump gaps in otherwise badly conceived stories... Judging by the first episode of ATV's new series, Timeslip, by Bruce Stewart, however, this programme looks like it might prove to be a welcome exception. [...] Its strength lies in the fact that it is imaginatively conceived in terms of the detailed development of the plot, and well written. ...if the standard is maintained, it will be a series well worth watching, and not just by the children, either". Later, during the broadcast of "The Time of the Ice Box", many of the children watching were frightened by the scene where Edith Joynton (Peggy Thorpe-Bates) ages to death thanks to an incorrect dosage of HA57; this scene was edited slightly when the series was repeated in 1973.

Timeslip has generally remained well-regarded in the years since first broadcast. A retrospective of the series in Dreamwatch magazine in 1996 concluded that Timeslip was "a series that demanded much of the viewer over 26 weeks and rewarded those who persevered". In 1999, when science fiction magazine SFX asked an expert panel from the SF field, including Terry Pratchett and Stephen Baxter, to compile a list of the top 50 SF shows of all time, Timeslip came thirtieth on the list. Later, in 2005, SFX went on to poll its readers for their list of the top 50 British telefantasy shows and Timeslip was voted into twenty-eighth position on the list, the magazine describing it as "surprisingly intelligent and thoughtful SF with some ambitious ideas" and a series that "dared to be more adventurous with its science fiction than most so-called grown-up SF shows".

== Archive status ==
Most of Timeslip was originally recorded on 625 line PAL colour videotape. An exception was episodes 23 and 24, which were recorded in black-and-white due to the so-called colour strike, an industrial action by technicians that affected many ITV programmes at this time. Today, only the final episode of "The Time of the Ice Box" survives in its original colour format. The remaining episodes exist as 16mm black-and-white telerecordings, which were made for overseas sales to countries not yet broadcasting in colour. Research for the 2009 documentary 'Timeslip: Behind the Barrier' revealed that only two episodes were recorded in black-and-white. An extra scene for episode 25 had to be taped during the same recording session, meaning that this episode was broadcast only in black-and-white.

It is believed the original videotapes for the wiped episodes were wiped and reused by Central in 1982 or '83 after they took over from ATV providing ITV programmes to the Midlands during an archive purge of programmes of their predecessors. At the time, these programmes were seen to have no commercial value and were deemed worthless. Other sources claim that when Central had taken over, it was found that the videotapes had been badly damaged by age and poor storage conditions and were disposed of on the grounds of poor technical quality unsuitable for broadcast.

== Home video release ==
Timeslip was released on VHS videotape by ITC Home Entertainment in 1992, with each serial issued as a double-pack. It was released entirely in black-and-white.

The complete series – including the now-found colour episode – was released in a four-disc region 2 DVD box set by Carlton in 2004.

A region 1 DVD, containing a restored and uncut version of the series, included the documentary Beyond the Barrier. This was issued in 2005 by A&E Home Video, under license from Granada International Media Limited. A new DVD release by Network Distributing was released in 2016 in black-and-white.

Timeslip: Behind the Barrier, an independent documentary chronicling the making of Timeslip was produced in 2009. It features interviews with many of the surviving cast members, including Cheryl Burfield, Spencer Banks, David Graham, Ian Fairbairn and Iris Russell as well as creator Ruth Boswell, writers Bruce Stewart and Victor Pemberton and director Ron Francis. It was produced by the owners of the official Timeslip website.

== Other media ==
A comic strip, which depicted several new adventures for Liz and Simon, appeared concurrently with the broadcast of the series in Look-In, a juvenile spin-off of the listings magazine TV Times. The comic strip was drawn by Mike Noble.Look-In also published a number of interviews with the show's two young stars.

A novelisation of the first two serials - "The Wrong End of Time" and "The Time of the Ice Box" - was written by James Boswell and published by Pan Books to coincide with the broadcast of the series in 1970. It is visible on-screen in episode 6 of the series Tightrope on a rack of books in the village shop/post office.

=== Big Finish ===
In 2020, Big Finish Productions released a new series of Timeslip. This comprised two box sets as full cast audio productions with original cast members Spencer Banks and Cheryl Burfield. The first box set was released on Timeslip's 50th Anniversary in May 2020, with the second set following in June 2020. Two more box sets were released in July 2023 and then August 2023.

No.	Title	Writer	Director	Released
1.	Timeslip: The Age of the Death Lottery	Andrew Smith	Helen Goldwyn	May 2020
2.	Timeslip: The War That Never Was	Marc Platt	Helen Goldwyn	June 2020
3.	Timeslip: A Life Never Lived	Roland Moore	Helen Goldwyn	July 2023
4.	Timeslip: The Time Of The Tipping Point	Helen Goldwyn	Helen Goldwyn	August 2023

== References and further reading ==
- Arnold, Jeff (1986). "Breaking Barriers". Time Screen: The Magazine of British Telefantasy (9).
- Fulton, Roger (1997). The Encyclopedia of TV Science Fiction (3rd ed.). London: Boxtree. ISBN 978-0-7522-1150-3.
- Houldsworth, Richard (July 1992). "Fantasy Flashback – Timeslip: The Wrong End of Time (Part 1)". TV Zone (32): 24–27. ISSN 0957-3844.
- Houldsworth, Richard (August 1992). "Fantasy Flashback – Timeslip: The Wrong End of Time (Part 2)". TV Zone (33): 16–20. ISSN 0957-3844.
- Houldsworth, Richard (February 1993). "Fantasy Flashback – Timeslip: The Time of the Ice Box". TV Zone (38): 50–54. ISSN 0957-3844.
- McGown, Alistair (December 1996). "Timeslip". Dreamwatch (28): 50–51. ISSN 1356-482X.
- Pixley, Andrew (1986). "Timeslip Episode Guide". Time Screen: The Magazine of British Telefantasy (9).
- Porter, John (1994). "Memories of Timeslip". TV Zone (Special #13: ITC Special): 42–47. ISSN 0960-8230.
- Robinson, Nigel (September 1990). "Timeslip (Part 1)". TV Zone (10): 24–27. ISSN 0957-3844.
- Robinson, Nigel (October 1990). "Timeslip (Part 2)". TV Zone (11): 12–15. ISSN 0957-3844.
- Robinson, Nigel (January 1991). "Episode Guide - Timeslip". TV Zone (14): 30–31. ISSN 0957-3844.
- Stewart, Bruce (2002). "Timeslip Memories Part Two". Timeslip.org.uk.
- Thompson, Andy (2004). Introduction to Timeslip (Timeslip DVD Special Feature). London: Carlton Visual Entertainment. 37115 06243.
