= Terry Hands =

English theatre director (1941–2020)

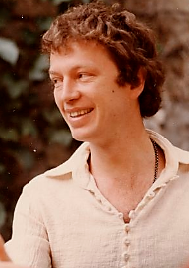
- Hands in 1972
- Born: Terence David Hands; 9 January 1941; Aldershot, Hampshire, England
- Died: 4 February 2020 (aged 79); London, England
- Occupation: Theatre director
- Years active: 1966–2015
- Spouse(s): Josephine Barstow (m. 1964; div. 1967) Ludmila Mikaël (m. 1974; div. 1980) Emma Lucia (m. 2002)
- Partner: Julia Lintott (1988–1996)
- Children: 3

Terence David Hands, CBE (9 January 1941 – 4 February 2020) was an English theatre director. He founded the Liverpool Everyman Theatre and ran the Royal Shakespeare Company for thirteen years during one of the company's most successful periods; he spent 25 years in all with the RSC. He also saved Clwyd Theatr Cymru from closure and turned it into the most successful theatre in Wales in his seventeen years as Artistic Director. He received several Olivier, Tony and Molière awards and nominations for directing and lighting.

== Early years ==
Hands was born at Aldershot, Hampshire, England, on 9 January 1941. His mother was a German immigrant, though during World War II and for several years afterward, she said that she was from Switzerland. He studied at Woking Grammar School and the University of Birmingham before attending the Royal Academy of Dramatic Art, leaving with the gold medal for acting in 1964. He then established the Liverpool Everyman where he directed numerous productions, including a prominent production of T.S. Eliot's "Murder in the Cathedral".

== Career ==
Hands was recruited by Peter Hall to the Royal Shakespeare Company two years later in 1966 to run the company's touring group Theatregoround. He became an associate director there in 1967, directing his first production for them, The Merry Wives of Windsor, in 1968 at the age of 27. He became joint Artistic Director with Trevor Nunn in 1978, and in 1986 sole chief executive. As Director Emeritus and Artistic Director he directed more productions during his 25 years there than any other director in the company’s history. These included the entire History Cycle with Alan Howard, Much Ado About Nothing and Edmond Rostand's Cyrano de Bergerac with Derek Jacobi and Sinéad Cusack (both productions transferred to Broadway), Christopher Marlowe's Tamburlaine with Sir Antony Sher, Love's Labour's Lost with Ralph Fiennes, Anton Chekov's The Seagull with Sir Simon Russell Beale, A Winter’s Tale with Jeremy Irons, Othello with Sir Ben Kingsley and David Suchet and the award-winning musical Poppy.

He was the first foreign director invited to direct at the Comédie-Française; he was made a Chevalier des Arts et des Lettres, and was appointed as a consultant director.

In 1997 Hands became Artistic Director of Theatr Clwyd (afterwards renamed Clwyd Theatr Cymru), which presents much of its work on tour in Wales and the rest of the UK, saving the theatre from closure.

He was appointed CBE in the 2007 Queen's New Years Honours List for his services to drama. In October 2001 he resigned from his position as an advisory director of the RSC.

In 2015 Hands left his post as Artistic Director of Clwyd Theatr Cymru after seventeen years in the post, having turned the theatre into the most successful in Wales and leaving a legacy of a Welsh company of associate artists.

His international directing credits include productions in Berlin, Brussels, Chicago, London, New York, Oslo, Paris, Tokyo, Vienna and Zurich. From 1975 to 1980 he was consultant-director of the Comédie-Française and was a Chevalier of Arts and Letters. His opera directing credits include "Otello" with Plácido Domingo (Paris Opera) and Parsifal (Royal Opera House).

== Personal life and death ==
Hands was married to soprano Dame Josephine Barstow (1964–1967), and afterwards to actress Ludmila Mikaël (1974–1980), with whom he had a daughter, César winning actress Marina Hands. During an eight-year relationship with actress and dancer Julia Lintott, between 1988 and 1996, he had two sons, Rupert who is also a director, and Sebastian. In 2002 he married director Emma Lucia. A chain smoker with an unhealthy diet, he once remarked "I virtually never eat vegetables, and I never eat a salad, ever".

Hands died from a stroke at Charing Cross Hospital in London, aged 79, on 4 February 2020. At the time of his death, he lived in Bryneglwys, Wales.

== Awards and nominations ==
Awards

- 1978: Laurence Olivier Award for Best Director – Henry VI
- 1983: Critics' Circle Theatre Awards for Best Classical Director – Cyrano de Bergerac
- 1983: Laurence Olivier Award for Best Director – Cyrano de Bergerac
- 1993: Evening Standard Awards for Best Director – Tamburlaine The Great
- 1993: Critics' Circle Theatre Awards for Best Director – Tamburlaine The Great

Nominations

- 1985: Tony Award for Best Director of a Play – Much Ado About Nothing
- 1985: Tony Award for Best Lighting Design – Much Ado About Nothing
- 1985: Tony Award for Best Lighting Design – Cyrano De Bergerac

== Stage productions ==
Theatregoround – Touring RSC

- 1966: The Second Shepherd's Play
- 1966: The Proposal, Anton Chekhov
- 1967: The Criminals, José Triana
- 1967: The Dumb Waiter, Harold Pinter
- 1967–1968: Under Milk Wood, Dylan Thomas

RSC (Royal Shakespeare Theatre and Aldwych Theatre)

- 1968: The Merry Wives of Windsor
- 1968: The Latent Heterosexual, Paddy Chayefsky
- 1969: Bartholomew Fair, Ben Jonson
- 1969: Pericles, Prince of Tyre
- 1969: Women Beware Women, Thomas Middleton
- 1970: Richard III
- 1971: The Balcony, Jean Genet
- 1971: The Man of Mode, George Etherege
- 1971–72: The Merchant of Venice (Also on UK tour)
- 1972: Murder in the Cathedral, T. S. Eliot
- 1973: Romeo and Juliet
- 1973: Cries from Casement as His Bones are Brought to Dublin, David Rudkin
- 1974: The Actor, (RSC Australian Tour)
- 1974: The Bewitched, Peter Barnes
- 1975–76: Henry IV parts 1 and 2
- 1975–76: Henry V (Also International tour)
- 1975–76: The Merry Wives of Windor
- 1977: Old World, Aleksei Arbuzov
- 1977–78: Henry VI Parts 1,2 and 3
- 1978: The Changeling, Thomas Middleton and William Rowley
- 1978–79: Coriolanus (also international tour)
- 1979: Children of the Sun, Maxim Gorky
- 1979–80: Twelfth Night
- 1980–81: As You Like It
- 1980–81: Richard II
- 1980–81: Richard III
- 1981: Troilus and Cressida
- 1982–83: Arden of Faversham
- 1982–84: Much Ado About Nothing

RSC at the Barbican Theatres and Royal Shakespeare Theatre

- 1982: Poppy, Peter Nichols
- 1983–984: Cyrano de Bergerac, Edmond Rostand (Also International tour)
- 1985: Red Noses, Peter Barnes
- 1985–86: The Winter's Tale
- 1987: The Balcony, Jean Genet
- 1987–88: Julius Caesar
- 1988: Carrie (musical), Stephen King
- 1988: Scenes from a Marriage, Peter Barnes
- 1989: Romeo and Juliet
- 1989–90: Coriolanus, co-directed with John Barton
- 1989–90: Singer, Peter Flannery (At The Swan, and The Pit)
- 1990–91: Love's Labour's Lost
- 1990–91: The Seagull, Anton Chekhov
- 1993: Tamburlaine the Great, Christopher Marlowe
- 1995: The Merry Wives of Windsor (at The National Theatre)

Chichester Festival

- 1995: Hadrian VII, Chichester Festival Theatre
- 1995: The Visit, Chichester Festival Theatre

Clwyd Theatr Cymru

- 1997: Equus
- 1998: A Christmas Carol, Peter Barnes
- 1998: The Journey of Mary Kelly, Siân Evans
- 1998: Table Manners
- 1998: Living Together
- 1998: Round And Round The Garden
- 1999: Twelfth Night
- 1999: Macbeth
- 2000: Under Milk Wood, Dylan Thomas
- 2001: King Lear
- 2001: Bedroom Farce
- 2001: The Rabbit, Meredydd Barker
- 2002: Rosencrantz and Guildenstern Are Dead, Tom Stoppard
- 2002: Romeo and Juliet
- 2002: The Four Seasons, Arnold Wesker
- 2002: Betrayal
- 2003: Blithe Spirit, Noël Coward
- 2003: The Crucible, Arthur Miller
- 2004: One Flew Over the Cuckoo's Nest, Ken Kesey
- 2005: Brassed Off
- 2005: Troilus and Cressida
- 2005: Brassed Off (Revival)
- 2005: Night Must Fall
- 2006: A Chorus of Disapproval
- 2006: Memory
- 2007: Arcadia
- 2007: Memory (Revival in New York)
- 2007: The Cherry Orchard
- 2008: Macbeth
- 2008: Memory (Revival in London and Wales tour)
- 2009: Noises Off
- 2009: Mary Stuart (featuring his daughter, Marina Hands as Mary)
- 2009: Pygmalion
- 2010: Arden of Faversham
- 2010: A Small Family Business
- 2010: Blackthorn
- 2011: The Taming of the Shrew
- 2012: As You Like It
- 2012: Boeing Boeing
- 2013: The Winslow Boy
- 2014: Under Milk Wood
- 2015: Hamlet
