= Diamonds on Wheels =

1974 British film by Jerome Courtland

- Theatrical release poster
- Directed by: Jerome Courtland
- Written by: Pierre Castex; William R. Yates
- Produced by: Ron Miller
- Starring: Peter Firth; Patrick Allen; George Sewell; Barry Jackson
- Music by: Ron Goodwin
- Production company: Walt Disney Productions
- Distributed by: Buena Vista Distribution Co.
- Release date: 19 August 1973
- Running time: 84 minutes
- Country: United Kingdom
- Language: English

Diamonds on Wheels is a 1973 British family comedy film directed by Jerome Courtland and starring Peter Firth, Patrick Allen, George Sewell, Derek Newark, George Woodbridge (in his last film, released five months after his death), and Barry Jackson. It was written by Pierre Castex and William R. Yates.

== Plot ==
Diamond thief Billy double-crosses his gang and drives off with the proceeds of a robbery but is killed when his car crashes. Subsequently Robert Stewart, his sister Susan and his friend Charlie find the wrecked car and use one its seats for a new sports car they are building, unaware of the stolen diamonds hidden in its lining. They enter the car in a 24-hour rally and Mercer, the gang's leader, sends his henchmen to retrieve the diamonds from the car.

== Cast ==
- Peter Firth as Robert "Bobby" Stewart
- Patrick Allen as Insp. Cook
- George Sewell as Henry Stewart
- Derek Newark as Mercer
- Dudley Sutton as Finch
- Barry Jackson as Wheeler
- Christopher Malcolm as Jock
- Richard Wattis as Sir Hilary Stanton
- Allan Cuthbertson as Gus Ashley
- Ambrosine Phillpotts as Lady Truesdale
- Maggie Hanley as Mrs. Maggie Stewart
- George Innes as Insp. Timothy
- George Woodbridge as PC Andrew
- Patrick Holt as steward
- Andrew McCulloch as Billy
- Arthur Hewlett as Benjy
- Patrick McAlliney as junkman
- Mark Edwards as Whiteman
- John Savident as steward
- Robin Langford as Peter Pitt
- Spencer Banks as Charlie Todd
- Cynthia Lund as Susan Stewart

== Reception ==
The Monthly Film Bulletin wrote: "Disney's first British production for some considerable time (efficiently directed by Forties matinee idol Jerome Courtland) fares well enough as a children's thriller, while the rally itself provides the setting for multiple ambushes and some diverting riddles. Unfortunately, the film runs out of steam once it leaves the racetrack, and the long slapstick sequence in the warehouse brings everything to a rather tired and arbitrary conclusion, making very scrappy use of the possibilities of the location. There is, however, plenty of amusement to be had from the performance of Dudley Sutton, playing Peter Lorre to Barry Jackson's Raymond Massey in a partnership strongly reminiscent of Arsenic and Old Lace."
