= Castex (surname) =

Castex is a Gascon surname meaning "castle". Notable people with the surname include:

- Alphonse Castex (1899–1969), French Olympic athlete
- Bertrand Pierre Castex (1771–1842) French general and viscount
- Françoise Castex, French Socialist MP
- Jean Castex (born 1965), French politician, Prime Minister of France from 2020 to 2022
- Jean-Jacques Castex (1731–1822), French sculptor
- Louis Castex (1868–1954), French sculptor
- Louis Castex (1896–1968), French aviation pioneer
- Michel Castex (born 1943), French journalist
- Pierre Castex (1924–1991), French scriptwriter
- Pierre-Georges Castex (1915–1995), literary critic
- Raoul Castex, French Navy Vice Admiral (1878–1968), theorist of naval warfare
