= Look-in =

Children's magazine

- 1977 cover of Look-in featuring The Bionic Woman, painted by Arnaldo Putzu
- Former editors: Alan Fennell (1971–1975); Colin Shelborn (from 1975)
- Staff writers: Angus Allan, Ed Stewart, Brian Moore, Peter Fairley
- Categories: Children, teenagers
- Frequency: Weekly
- Publisher: ITV (1971–1991); IPC (1991–1994)
- First issue: 9 January 1971
- Final issue: 12 March 1994
- Country: United Kingdom

Look-in was a children's magazine centred on ITV's television programmes in the United Kingdom, and subtitled "Junior TVTimes". It ran from 9 January 1971 to 12 March 1994. Briefly in 1985 a BBC-based rival appeared called BEEB; another was launched in 1989, Fast Forward, which went on to outsell Look-in.

== Format ==
Look-in had interviews, crosswords and competitions, and featured pictures and pin-ups of TV stars and pop idols of the time. Its main feature, however, was the many comic strips based on favourite children's television programmes, all of which were being shown on the ITV network at the time.

When the magazine began publication, it was edited by Alan Fennell and the strips were written by Angus Allan. Fennell left in 1975 and the art editor, Colin Shelborn, took over as editor. The covers were initially photographic, but beginning at issue 40, began to feature paintings by Arnaldo Putzu, an Italian working in London who had created many cinema posters in the 1960s, including designs for the Carry On films. His Look-in covers were mostly painted using acrylics.

Introduced mainly as a vehicle for children to find out what was on ITV, it included highlight listings for each ITV region of programmes likely to appeal to its target market, but Look-in also spotlighted popular children's topics and pastimes of the day. Skateboarding, BMX and yo-yoing were all featured in the magazine. Although primarily a television magazine, it also often featured articles on sport such as On The Ball with Brian Moore, as well as science articles written by Peter Fairley. DJ Ed Stewart became a regular face in Look-in, appearing in the first issue in a feature about a day in his life, he was later given his own pages called Stewpot's Newsdesk which ran until 1980. Alan Fennell, who edited Look-in, wrote episodes for most of Gerry Anderson's series.

After television, the next biggest topic featured was pop music. This usually took the form of interview articles and pull-out pin-ups of the top acts of the day, from ABBA and the Bay City Rollers in the 1970s to Adam and the Ants and Bros in the 1980s. Picture strips on pop groups at first featured life stories on ABBA and The Beatles (among others) and went on to become original adventures stories for groups such as Madness and Bucks Fizz.

In September 1981, Look-in changed its design, adopting a new logo and with photo covers replacing the cover paintings. By the late 1980s, the comic was struggling to compete with glossier teen magazines and sales were dropping. By the early 1990s, Look-in was catering for a younger age group by featuring picture strip stories based on cartoons and short and choppy fact-file type articles. The final issue was published in 1994.

During its run, Look-in annuals and Summer Special issues were released each year. In 2007 Carlton Books published a compilation reprint, Best of the Seventies, under their Prion and Sevenoaks imprints. This was followed-up by a Best of the Eighties the following year.

== Picture strips ==
The mainstay of Look-in was the picture strips. The following is a selected list of various strips featured:

=== Television-based ===
- Timeslip (Jan 71 – Dec 72)
- Freewheelers (Jan 71 – Mar 72)
- Please Sir! (Jan 71 – Jan 73)
- Crowther in Trouble (Jan 71 – Dec 72)
- Bright's Boffins (Apr – Aug 71)
- Voyage to the Bottom of the Sea (May – Sep 71)
- Follyfoot (Jul 71 – May 74)
- On the Buses (Aug 71 – May 74)
- The Flaxton Boys (Sep – Nov 71)
- The Fenn Street Gang (Nov 71 – Nov 73)
- Catweazle (Jan – Oct 72)
- Doctor at Large / at Sea / On the Go (May 72 – Oct 78)
- Elephant Boy (Oct 72 – Apr 73)
- Pathfinders (Dec 72 – May 73)
- The Tomorrow People (Jul 73 – Apr 78)
- Bless This House (Dec 73 – Sep 75)
- The Kids from 47A (Feb – Sep 74)
- The World at War (Feb – May 74)
- Kung Fu (Apr 74 – Jun 75)
- The Adventures of Black Beauty (Jun 74 – Sep 75)
- The Benny Hill Show (Jan 75 – Jan 81)
- The Six Million Dollar Man (Jun 75 – Mar 79)
- Space: 1999 (Sep 75 – Mar 77)
- Man About the House (Oct 75 – Jul 76)
- The Bionic Woman (Aug 76 – May 79)
- Just William (Apr – Oct 77)
- Man from Atlantis (Feb – Jul 78)
- Logan's Run (Apr – Sep 78)
- The Famous Five (Jul 78 – Feb 80)
- How the West Was Won (Oct 78 – Apr 79)
- Mind Your Language (Oct 78 – Mar 80)
- Dick Turpin (Mar – Oct 79)
- Worzel Gummidge (Apr 79 – Sep 82)
- Bionic Action (combining The Six Million Dollar Man and The Bionic Woman) (May – Nov 79)
- CHiPs (May – Jun 79, May 81 – Feb 83)
- Sapphire & Steel (Aug 79 – Apr 81)
- Battlestar Galactica (Oct 79 – Oct 80)
- Charlie's Angels (Nov 79 – May 81)
- The Further Adventures of Oliver Twist (1980)
- Mork & Mindy (Mar 80 – Mar 81)
- Buck Rogers in the 25th Century (Oct 80 – Jan 82)
- Hart to Hart (Dec 80 – Apr 81)
- The Smuggler (May – Sep 81)
- Cannon and Ball (Jul 81 – Oct 88)
- Magnum, P.I. (Jan – Jul 82)
- Danger Mouse (Mar 82 – Nov 85, Sep 86 – 89)
- The Fall Guy (Jun 82 – Oct 84)
- Into the Labyrinth (Sep – Dec 82)
- Star Fleet (based on the UK dubbed version of X-Bomber), Jan – Jul 83)
- Murphy's Mob (Mar – Sep 83)
- Knight Rider (Aug 83 – Sep 86)
- Terrahawks (Dec 83 – Apr 84)
- Robin of Sherwood (Apr 84 – Sep 86)
- The A-Team (Oct 84 – Mar 88)
- Super Gran (Feb – Oct 85, 89)
- Street Hawk (Mar – Oct 85)
- Alias the Jester (Nov 85 – Sep 86)
- That's My Boy (Apr – Sep 86)
- Airwolf (Sep 86 – Jan 87)
- Inspector Gadget (Sep 86 – 88)
- Alf (Mar – Sep 88)
- Galaxy High School (89–90)
- Count Duckula (89)
- Dogtanian and the Three Muskehounds (89)
- Bill and Ted's Excellent Adventures (91–92)
- Garfield (88 – Mar 94)
- Scooby-Doo (87 – Mar 94)
- No. 73 (86–88)

=== Music-based ===
- David Cassidy – The Adventures of David Cassidy (Dec 72 – Dec 73)
- Bay City Rollers – Shang-A-Lang (Mar – Sep 75)
- Slik – Slik Stories (Jul–Oct 76)
- Flintlock – It's Flintlock! (Oct 76 – Feb 77)
- ABBA – ABBA Exclusive Official (Mar 77 – Mar 78)
- Elvis Presley – Elvis the Story (Jan – Sep 81)
- The Beatles – The Story of the Beatles (Sep 81 – Feb 82)
- Madness – It's Madness (Sep 81 – Feb 83)
- Haircut One Hundred (Jul 82 – Jan 83)
- Bucks Fizz (Feb 83 – Feb 85)
- a-ha
- Five Star – The 5 Star Life (87–89)
- Split Enz (November 80)
- Bros
- Kylie Minogue
- Jason Donovan
- Michael Jackson

=== Miscellaneous ===
- Mark Strong (Jul 72 – Jan 73) — based on a toy
- The Smurfs – Meet the Smurfs! (Sep 78 – Aug 81) – Fictional characters, predating the TV series
- When They Were Young (Sep 83 – Jan 84) – Life stories of various celebrities
- The Story So Far (Nov 85–89) – Life stories of various pop stars
