= Cries from Casement as His Bones Are Brought to Dublin =

Radio play by David Rudkin

Cries from Casement as His Bones are Brought to Dublin is a radio play written by David Rudkin that examines the life and controversial legacy of Irish nationalist and British diplomat Roger Casement. It was first broadcast on BBC Radio 3 on 4 February 1973 and has been hailed as a masterpiece of radio drama.

== Development ==
The project began in 1966, a year after Roger Casement's body was repatriated to Ireland, as a commission for Rudkin to contribute to a radio series on historical rebels. It morphed into a play about Casement when he realized that the social and political climate of the country at the time bore strong parallels to that of Casement's era. Rudkin utilized Casement's own diaries in the course of his research.

Regarding the fragmentary, collage-like style of the piece, Rudkin later said, "To mediate such a quantity and complexity of material, I found myself logically evolving a variety of techniques, all of them thematic – and very much to do with radio broadcasting. (Looking at it now, I think it’s rather like a radio Citizen Kane.)"

== Broadcast ==
The BBC broadcast of the play, on 4 February 1973, was produced by John Tydeman and starred Norman Rodway as Roger Casement. Other members of the cast include: Joan Bakewell, Sean Barrett, Kate Binchy, Michael Deacon, William Eedle, Kevin Flood, Martin Friend, Heather Gibson, David Gooderson, Sheila Grant, Michael N. Harbour, John Hollis, Fraser Kerr, Rolf Lefebure, Peggy Marshall, Meryl O'Keefe, Irene Prador, David Rudkin, Henry Stamper, Eva Stuart, John Tusa, David Valla, Mary Wimbush, and Joy Worth.

== Critical reception ==
Rudkin's play drew parallels between the political context of Casement's life and times with contemporary issues in 1973, including themes exploring the legacies of nationalism and violence. Radio critic Gillian Reynolds praised the broadcast as a major success, with an innovative style that matched the complexity of the subject matter. "Through Norman Rodway's magnificent central performance as Casement," wrote Reynolds, "both Mr Rudkin and his producer John Tydeman found the means of bringing the irony, the sensuality, the political passion together in a work of totally admirable richness and force."

"One of the great masterpieces of radio drama writing and directing," according to radio drama producer Alan Beck, who also noted its daring subject matter for the time, including political violence and frank depictions of homosexuality.

The Sunday Telegraph observed that, according to scholars, the play's content was not always historically accurate, but nonetheless praised the writing, direction and performances to conclude that the broadcast was "a tour de force." Writer Brian Inglis criticized the work for a lack of accuracy, particularly with respect to Casement's homosexuality and intersection with his growing nationalism. Biographer B. L. Reid was more sympathetic to Rudkin's postulate. Rudkin subsequently replied to Inglis with a lengthy rebuttal in Encounter, arguing that his work, albeit with poetic liberties, more accurately portrayed the inner life of the man and his motivations. Richard Mayne expressed a similar sentiment, calling the play "near-fiction" but acknowledging it as compelling drama. Poet Anthony Thwaite writing for The Listener praised it as "a rich, powerful, thickly plotted but always clear piece of writing...imaginative radio at its best," singling out Rodway's performance and the subtlety of Tydeman's production aesthetic. The Sunday Times described it as "monumental", pointing out that the intention of the piece was clearly impressionistic and not intended to be rote history..."a long, moving radio poem." Paul Ferris writing for The Observer, expressed skepticism at the connection drawn between Casement's sexual orientation and his nationalism, but nonetheless described it as "a powerful text".

Professor David Ian Rabey has described the play as "astonishing" and "regrettably overlooked".

In Sight Unseen, a study of radio drama's medium specificity, Elissa S. Guralnick cites the play as a prime example of the medium's ability to use its adjacency to documentary and journalistic forms to achieve a dramatic intent. Radio also allowed Rudkin to maintain the "essential interiority" of Casement's diaries, bringing to life the character's internal thoughts and feelings and sharing them with the audience but not with other characters.

Portions of the broadcast's sound design was incorporated into The Casement Project, a dance piece led by Fearghus Ó Conchúir and inspired in part by the play. It was commissioned by the Arts Council of Ireland in 2016.

== Stage adaptation ==
A stage version of the play was performed by the Royal Shakespeare Company later that same year. It received negative reviews. "The potted history of Ireland for 3,000 years is pantomimed with custard-pie subtleties and clownish acrobatics that can raise no laughs," said writer Maeve Binchy. Another stage production debuted at the Dublin Theatre Festival in 1975. It ran a year later at Project Arts Theatre, where Irish Times writer Kane Archer found it to be a powerful story undermined by its inherent radio-specific construction.

In an interview in 2015, Rudkin distanced himself from attempts to produce it for the stage. He characterized the theatre production as "... misconceived, and does not merit discussion."
