= Spencer Banks =

British television actor (born 1954)

Spencer Banks (born 1954 in Chesterfield) is a British television actor.

He was mainly active in the 1970s, when he tended to play a geeky adolescent in glasses. He starred in two significant programmes: the popular children's science fiction serial Timeslip as Simon Randall, and the Play for Today Penda's Fen (1974) by David Rudkin directed by Alan Clarke. He also appeared in television series including Alexander the Greatest, The Witch's Daughter, Tightrope, The Georgian House, Crossroads and Backs to the Land, films such as Diamonds on Wheels (1973) and A Christmas Carol (1984), and a 1981 radio version of The Chrysalids. In 2015 he appeared as 'Reverend Simon Randall' in The Amityville Playhouse opposite former Timeslip co-star Cheryl Burfield.

== Filmography ==
=== Television ===
Television acting roles
Year(s)	Title	Role	Description
1970	Germinal	Jeanlin	Television miniseries
1970–1971	Timeslip	Simon Randall	1 series of television series
1971	Alexander the Greatest	Four Eyes	4 episodes of television series: "A Week to Live"; "The All Night Party"; "The Match"; "The Disengagement of Murray and Renata"
1971	The Witch's Daughter	Tim	Television miniseries
1971	Softly, Softly: Task Force	Philip Dent	1 episode of television series: "An Inside Job"
1972	Tightrope	Martin Clifford	1 series of television series
1973	Armchair 30	Print	1 episode of television series: "Harry Sebrof's Story"
1973	Diamonds on Wheels	Charlie Todd	Television film Aired on The Magical World of Disney in March 1974.
1973	Murder Must Advertise	Ginger Joe	Television miniseries
1974	Play for Today: Penda's Fen	Stephen Franklin	Television film
1974	Softly, Softly: Taskforce	Peter Simpson	1 episode of television series: "A Day's Work"
1975	Village Hall	Andy	1 episode of television series: "Lot 23"
1975	Kim & Co.	Peter Nilson	1 episode of television series: "Captain Peter"
1975	Crown Court	Thomas Tidwell	1 episode of television series: "Evil Liver"
1976	The Georgian House	Dan	1 series of television series
1976–1977	Crossroads	Clive Merrow	1 series of television series
1977	Backs to the Land	Ernie	3 episodes of television series: "Nymphs and Shepherds Come Expensive"; "We Shall Fight Them in the Breeches"; "All Is Somehow Gathered In"
1977	The Sound of Laughter	Stephen	1 episode of television series: "What a Performance"
1978	Wilde Alliance	Shop Assistant	1 episode of television series: "A Game for Two Players"
1978	Pennies from Heaven	Maurice	Television miniseries
1979	The Dick Emery Show	On-screen participant	1 episode of television series: Series 17, Episode 2
1979	BBC2 Playhouse	Denford	1 episode of television series: "The Brylcreem Boys"
1979	Minder	Keith	1 episode of television series: "The Bengal Tiger"
1979	A Star for My Son	Johan	Short film
1978	A Man Called Intrepid	Cpl. Kaufman	Television miniseries
1980	Play for Today: No Defence	PC Knox	Television film
1980	Grandad	PC Holroyd	1 episode of television series: Series 2, Episode 2
1984	Cockles	Reporter	1 episode of television series: "Davy Jones's Locker"
1984	A Christmas Carol	Dick Wilkins	Television film
1985	Shine on Harvey Moon	Policeman	1 episode of television series: "Love Is Blind"
1985	A Better Class of Person	Raymond	Television film
1992	No Job for a Lady	Terry	1 episode of television series: "A Bed for the Night"
2002	Doctors	Mr. Simpkins	1 episode of television series: "Who's Going to Know?"

=== Film ===
Film acting roles
Year	Title	Role	Description
1973	Cari Genitori		Uncredited; Released as "Dear Parents" in the UK
1974	Living at Thamesmead	Tom	Short film
2015	The Amityville Playhouse	Rev. Simon Randall	Loosely based on The Amityville Horror
