= Castex =

Castex may refer to:

== Communes in France ==
- Castex, Ariège, in the Ariège department
- Castex, Gers, in the Gers department
- Castex-d'Armagnac, in the Gers department

== Other uses ==
- Castex (surname)
- Castex government, French government of 2020–2022
