= Fiona Kennedy =

Scottish singer, actress and broadcaster

Fiona Kennedy Clark (born 2 July 1955), OBE, DL is a Scottish singer, actress and broadcaster, and the daughter of Scottish and Gaelic singers Calum Kennedy and Anne Gillies. As a child she appeared with her parents as they performed as a family, and this developed into a successful solo career.

== Career ==
Kennedy's TV appearances include the 1971 series The Witch's Daughter, Sutherland's Law and Mauro the Gypsy, made for the Children's Film Foundation and released in 1972, four series of Record Breakers on BBC1 and the New Year Show with Sir Trevor MacDonald. She also presented Behind the Scenes at Monarch of the Glen. She has also appeared on BBC TV's Songs of Praise as a singer. In 1985, Kennedy attempted to represent the UK in the Eurovision Song Contest with the song So Do I, performed as a duet with Mike Redway. The song placed equal last in the televised A Song for Europe contest.

She had a role in the 1973 film The Wicker Man, in which she played Holly Grimmond. Her production The Kist has enjoyed 5 star reviews at The Edinburgh Festival Fringe and has also been performed in Aberdeen, Glasgow and New York.

She has recorded several albums including Maiden Heaven and Coming Home. Her 2017 album Time to Fly includes songs co-written with Beth Nielsen-Chapman and duets with Ross Wilson of Blue Rose Code.

Kennedy sang for Queen Elizabeth II on a number of occasions and performed at the G8 Summit at Edinburgh Castle. She has sung at the first NATO Burns Supper in Brussels, performed at Celtic Connections and Transatlantic Sessions on BBC 2, touring with Runrig, hosted television programmes for PBS in America, narrated Peter and the Wolf and The Snowman with the RSNO, presented Live at The Lemon Tree for BBC Scotland with Phil Cunningham, and narrated The Three Ships with Sir Tony Robinson, composed by Paul Mealor. She has acted in a number of plays including Alfie in the West End and Ane Satyre of the Thrie Estaites at the Edinburgh International Festival.

A visit to Ellis Island inspired her own production The Kist, which appeared at the Edinburgh Fringe Festival, as well as at venues in Scotland, London and New York. She collaborates regularly with writer and director John Bett including ten years of Nae Ordinary Burns Supper.

Kennedy is a Deputy Lord Lieutenant of Aberdeenshire. She is Honorary President of VSA, and is the Patron of charities including FROM Scotland (Famine Relief for Orphans in Malawi), Speakeasy, St Margaret’s Braemar, Jazzartuk and Pitlochry Festival Theatre. In addition she is an Ambassador for London Scottish Rugby Club.

== Theatre ==
Year	Title	Role	Company	Director	Notes
1982	Ane Satyre of the Thrie Estaites	Danger	Scottish Theatre Company	Tom Fleming	play by Sir David Lindsay, adapted by Robert Kemp

== Honours ==
Kennedy was appointed Officer of the Order of the British Empire (OBE) in the 2014 New Year Honours for services to music and for charitable services in Scotland.
