= The Witch's Daughter =

1966 novel by Nina Bawden

- First edition cover
- Author: Nina Bawden
- Illustrator: Shirley Hughes
- Language: English
- Genre: Children's novel
- Publisher: Victor Gollancz
- Publication date: 1966
- Publication place: United Kingdom
- Media type: Print (Hardback; Paperback)
- Pages: 160 pp

The Witch's Daughter is a children's novel by Nina Bawden, first published in 1966. It has been dramatised for television twice, with Fiona Kennedy (1971) and Sammy Glenn (1996) in the title role.

== Plot summary ==
On the small remote Scottish isle of Skua, Perdita has been branded "the witch's daughter" by islanders. They believe her mother died cursing the sea on which they depend for their livelihood (most of the men are fishermen). She lives in a tumbledown house by the loch, alone apart from the housekeeper Annie, never goes to school and has no friends. The house's owner, Mr Smith, is usually absent and expects Perdita to keep out of his way when he is there. The village children avoid or bully her, saying she's a witch like her mother.

One summer Janey, who is blind, and her elder brother Tim visit the island with their naturalist father who wants to find a rare orchid that might grow there. Another English tourist, Mr Jones, arrives at the same time and also stays in the hotel (a village inn with a few rooms). The children befriend the lonely girl Perdita, though she is at first very shy as she has only experienced cruelty from other children before. Mr Smith arrives to stay in his old house with Annie and Perdita. One evening Perdita overhears Mr Jones in the kitchen talking with Mr Smith.

Together they search for fossils (mostly Tim, who's very interested in fossils), explore the island's caves, investigate an old unsolved crime as well as a current one after Tim's father is assaulted, and find treasure.

They are threatened by the crooks calling themselves Jones and Smith (not their real names) who had stolen many valuable jewels from deposit boxes during a bank robbery a few years before and hidden them in the island's sea-caves, but eventually the children are unharmed and the thieves don't manage to get the stolen treasure back. The children find the hidden jewels and they are handed to the police for return to the bank.

Tim and Janey's holiday ends and their father is with them as they board the ferry to leave the island. Perdita comes to them just as the ferry is leaving with a bunch of wild flowers she has picked for Janey - they are the ones their father had been searching for, so it seems they might return to the island another time so that Perdita can show him where they grow. As Perdita is now something of a hero the local children stop being so mean to her; also she is expected to start attending school soon after the end of the story and will be less isolated.

== Television adaptations ==
The Witch's Daughter has been twice adapted for television. The 1971 BBC adaptation was a five-episode mini-series starring Fiona Kennedy as Perdita, Gillian Bailey as Janey and Spencer Banks as Tim. The 1996 Scottish Television production was a 90-minute television film, with Sammy Glenn as Perdita, Richard Claxton as Tim, Peter Firth as Mr Jones, and Patrick Bergin as Mr Smith. Changes between the novel and the film included the excision of the character Janey and a more upbeat ending. The 1996 TV movie was directed by Alan Macmillan.
