= Denis Quilley =

English actor, singer (1927–2003)

Denis Quilley OBE
- Quilley c. 1960
- Born: Denis Clifford Quilley; 26 December 1927; Islington, London, England
- Died: 5 October 2003 (aged 75); London, England
- Years active: Actor
- Spouse: Stella Chapman (m. 1949)
- Children: 3

Denis Clifford Quilley (26 December 1927 – 5 October 2003) was an English actor and singer. From a family with no theatrical connections, Quilley was determined from an early age to become an actor. He was taken on by the Birmingham Repertory Theatre in his teens, and after a break for compulsory military service he began a West End career in 1950, succeeding Richard Burton in The Lady's Not For Burning. In the 1950s he appeared in revue, musicals, operetta and on television as well as in classic and modern drama in the theatre.

During the 1960s Quilley established himself as a leading actor, making his first films and starring on Australian television. In the early 1970s he was a member of Laurence Olivier's National Theatre company. He joined the Royal Shakespeare Company in 1977 in the central role in Privates on Parade, which was later made into a feature film. His later parts in musicals included the title role and Judge Turpin in Sweeney Todd (1980; 1993) and Georges in La Cage aux Folles (1986).

In the 1990s Quilley returned to the National Theatre company, playing a wide range of parts, from Shakespearean comedy to Jacobean revenge tragedy, Victorian classics and his final role, a bibulous millionaire in the musical Anything Goes.

== Life and career ==
=== Early years ===
Quilley was born in Islington, North London, the son of Clifford Charles Quilley, a Post Office telegraphist, and his wife Ada Winifred, née Stanley. He won a scholarship to Bancroft's School in Woodford Green, London, and was expected to go from there to a university, but he was determined to become an actor as soon as possible. He made his stage debut with the Birmingham Repertory Theatre Company, during the 1945 season, in a company that, he recalled, included Paul Scofield, Stanley Baker, Paul Eddington, Alun Owen and "a 20-year-old wunderkind director called Peter Brook, of whom everybody was already in some awe."

Quilley's early career was interrupted when he was conscripted for national service in the army, based in Khartoum. His first London appearance after his release from the forces was at the Globe in 1950, when he took over the part of Richard in John Gielgud's production of The Lady's Not For Burning from Richard Burton, whom he had understudied in the early months of the run. The understudy to Claire Bloom in the play was Stella Chapman, whom Quilley married in 1949. They had a son and two daughters.

Later in 1950 Quilley joined the Old Vic Company for a British Council tour of Italy, playing Fabian in Twelfth Night and Gratiano in The Merchant of Venice. He took part in a revival of the 17th century gigue Michael and Francis at Hampton Court as part of the Festival of Britain in 1951, and sang in other performances by the London Opera Club alongside established opera singers, including their fifth anniversary concert at the Arts Council in 1953. In 1953 he appeared in revue, with Max Adrian, Betty Marsden and Moyra Fraser in Airs on a Shoestring, which ran for more than 700 performances. In 1955 he had his first leading role in a West End production, playing Geoffrey Morris in the musical Wild Thyme, by Philip Guard and Donald Swann. In The Manchester Guardian, Philip Hope-Wallace wrote, "Denis Quilley turns out a comparatively rare figure nowadays: a presentable singing English hero, a most likeable performance." In 1956 Quilley opened in another long-running show, Grab Me a Gondola which played for more than 600 performances.

One of Quilley's other singing roles of the 1950s was the title character in Leonard Bernstein's operetta Candide. It ran for only sixty performances in this first London production in 1959; Quilley returned to the piece later in his career, playing the bombastic Baron and the misanthropic Martin in a National Theatre production in 1999. Quilley made no cinema films in the 1950s, but appeared in several television productions, ranging from Shakespeare (Bassanio in The Merchant of Venice, 1955) to detective fiction (Jimmy Sutane in Dancers in Mourning (1959)).

=== 1960s ===
After playing in short runs of non-musical productions Quilley returned to a singing role in 1960, when he took over from Keith Michell as Nestor-le-Fripe in Irma la Douce. He made his first Broadway appearance the following year, again taking over the part of Nestor and subsequently touring the US with the production. After returning to England, he appeared at the Open Air Theatre, Regent's Park in June, 1963, as Benedick in Much Ado About Nothing. In November of that year he played Antipholus of Ephesus in The Boys From Syracuse, with Bob Monkhouse as his twin brother, also recorded. At the Savoy in 1964 he played Charles Condomine in the musical High Spirits, an adaptation of Coward's Blithe Spirit which had a run of three months. Quilley sang in two complete BBC Gilbert and Sullivan radio broadcasts in 1966; Strephon in Iolanthe, and Florian in Princess Ida.

In 1965, Quilley appeared in the science-fiction TV series Undermind playing Professor Val Randolph - a scientist who after four episodes is revealed to be an alien traitor. The same year he made his first cinema film, playing Ben in Life at the Top. His only other film of the 1960s was Anne of the Thousand Days (1969), in which he appeared as Weston. In the later 1960s he worked extensively in Australia; he toured with June Bronhill in the musical Robert and Elizabeth, and became known for his role as Customs Inspector Ted Hallam in ABC Television's drama series, Contrabandits.

Returning to Britain in 1969 Quilley joined the company of the Nottingham Playhouse, which was among the leading repertory theatres of the time. Among his roles there was Archie Rice in John Osborne's The Entertainer, a part created in the original London production by Laurence Olivier. By this time Olivier was in charge of the National Theatre; the director Michael Blakemore, one of his team, saw the new production and recommended Quilley to Olivier.

=== 1970s ===
In the 1970s and again towards the end of his career Quilley was a member of the National company, first at the Old Vic and then at the new building on the South Bank. Under Olivier's directorship he played Tullus Aufidius in Coriolanus, with Anthony Hopkins in the title role (1971); Jamie in Long Day's Journey Into Night with Olivier (1971, filmed for television in 1973); Banquo in Macbeth (with Hopkins); Bolingbroke in Richard II; Crabtree in The School for Scandal; Hildy Johnson in The Front Page (all 1972) and Lopakhin in The Cherry Orchard (1973). In The Times, the critic Barry Norman said that Quilley was "the only Banquo I have ever seen act Macbeth off the stage". When Peter Hall succeeded Olivier in 1975, Quilley was the only member of the old company to be invited to appear in the opening production of the new regime, playing Caliban to Gielgud's Prospero in The Tempest. When the National moved to the new building in 1976, Quilley disliked acting there; he found it "like going to work in a factory", and he declined to return during the next 14 seasons.

Quilley made two cinema films in the 1970s, playing Antonio Foscarelli in Murder on the Orient Express and Bateson in The Black Windmill (both 1974). He appeared on television in a wide range of roles, from Commander Traynor in a children's science fiction series, Timeslip (1970), to Charles II in A Bill of Mortality (1975), George Cannon in a serialisation of the Clayhanger novels (1975), and the title role in Frederic Raphael's version of Aeschylus's Agamemnon (1979).

In 1977, the Royal Shakespeare Company offered Quilley the role of Captain Terri Dennis in Peter Nichols's Privates On Parade. It was a singing role, but far removed from the romantic leads he had sung before. The character is a camp performer and director in a 1940s army song-and-dance troupe in Malaya. At first he declined the role, but reconsidered, reckoning the captain to be the most human character in the piece; he played him, as The Guardian reported, "as a vulnerable human being rather than a buffoon". For his performance Quilley won the Society of West End Theatre Award for Best Actor in a Musical. He reprised the role in a film version made in 1982. Also in 1977, in the West End, Quilley played James opposite Deborah Kerr in George Bernard Shaw's Candida. His last stage part of the decade was Sidney in Ira Levin's thriller, Deathtrap, which had a short run at the Garrick Theatre.

=== 1980s ===
Quilley returned to musicals in 1980, playing the title role in the first London production of Hugh Wheeler and Stephen Sondheim's Sweeney Todd: The Demon Barber of Fleet Street. He won his second SWET award for the performance. He continued to divide his time between the musical and non-musical theatre. In 1983 he played Jupiter/Napoleon III in the BBC television production of Orpheus in the Underworld. In 1984 Quilley appeared on the original concept album for the musical Chess as Molokov. In 1985 at the Chichester Festival Theatre he co-starred with Diana Rigg in Antony and Cleopatra. Later that year he was in a BBC mini-series Murder of a Moderate Man and a West End thriller, Fatal Attraction, before returning to musical theatre, in La Cage aux Folles in 1986. He played Georges, the partner of the flamboyant Albin (George Hearn). In The Guardian Michael Billington wrote that Quilley made his character "dapper, ebullient and tender: he persuades you he might have both sired a son and loved a man." In 1989 he played Francisco Pizarro in a national tour of The Royal Hunt of the Sun. Billington commented that Quilley "conveys Pizzaro's journey from tough, hard brutal commander to enraptured idolater and, finally, grieving lover: he is at once indisputably masculine and a figure skittishly enlivened by his rival's physical presence."

During the 1980s Quilley continued to appear in numerous television broadcasts, playing parts like Parris in The Crucible, W. E. Gladstone in Number 10, Captain Waterhouse in Tales Of The Unexpected, Peter in a biblical mini-series A.D. (1985) and Dr. Leon Sterndale in the 1988 Sherlock Holmes adaptation The Devil's Foot. His cinema roles in the 1980s were Kenneth Marshall in Evil Under the Sun (1982), Captain Dennis in the film of Privates on Parade (1982), Rejeb in Memed My Hawk (1984), the prophet Samuel in King David (1985), and the Prime Minister in Foreign Body (1986). He took the role of God in Britten's Noye's Fludde in London in 1995.

=== 1990s ===
In 1993 Quilley played Bob Carruthers in the Sherlock Holmes story The Solitary Cyclist for the BBC Radio 4 Sherlock Holmes drama series. As part of the character, he demonstrated his fine singing voice. Quilley played Judge Turpin in the 1993 revival of Sweeney Todd at the National Theatre, resuming his original role as the demon barber later in the run. His other roles at the National included Sir Oliver Surface in The School for Scandal (1990), Brachiano in The White Devil (1991), Falstaff in The Merry Wives of Windsor, Nestor in Troilus and Cressida (1999), Sir John Vesey in Money (1999), Polonius in Hamlet (2000) and George Pye in Humble Boy (2001). In his spells at the National from the 1970s onwards he played a total of 28 roles. His last stage performance was as the bibulous tycoon Elisha Whitney in Cole Porter's Anything Goes at the Olivier Theatre in 2002. The production was a success, but during the run his health gave way. The show transferred to the Theatre Royal Drury Lane shortly after his death, and the first night was dedicated to his memory.

== Personal life ==
In the 1980s he was a supporter of the Social Democratic Party. Quilley was appointed an Officer of the Order of the British Empire (OBE) in the 2002 New Year Honours.

== Death ==
Quilley was working on his autobiography in the months before he died in 2003 at his home in London, aged 75, from liver cancer.

== Filmography ==
Year	Title	Role	Notes
1955	The Merchant of Venice	Bassanio	TV
1959	Dancers in Mourning	John Wilton	TV
1965	Undermind	Professor Val Randolph	TV series
1965	Life at the Top	Ben	Feature film
1966	Where the Spies Are	Dentist	Feature film
1967	Contrabandits	Customs Inspector Ted Hallam	TV series
1969	Anne of the Thousand Days	Sir Francis Weston	Feature film
1971	Timeslip	Commander Traynor	TV series
1974	The Black Windmill	Bateson	Feature film
1974	Murder on the Orient Express	Gino Foscarelli	Film
1975	In This House of Brede	Sir Richard	Feature film
1975	A Bill of Mortality	Charles II	
1976	Clayhanger	George Cannon	TV series
1981	Masada	General Marcus Quadratus	TV miniseries
1981	The Crucible	Reverend Samuel Parris	TV play
1981	Tales Of The Unexpected	Captain Waterhouse	TV series
1982	Evil Under the Sun	Kenneth Marshall	Feature film
1983	Privates on Parade	Captain Terri Dennis	Feature film
1983	Orpheus in the Underworld	Jupiter/Napoleon III	TV production of the operetta
1983	Murder of a Moderate Man	Morgan Hunter-Brown	TV miniseries
1983	Number 10	W. E. Gladstone	TV series
1984	Memed My Hawk	Rejeb	Film
1985	King David	Samuel	Feature film
1985	A.D.	Saint Peter	TV miniseries
1986	Foreign Body	Prime Minister	Feature film
1988	The Devil's Foot	Dr. Leon Sterndale	TV
1990	Mister Johnson	Bulteen	Feature film
1991	Rich Tea and Sympathy	George Rudge	Feature film
1993	Sparrow	Baron Cesaro	Feature film
