= Ania Marson =

Polish and British actress

- Born: Anna Bujniewicz; 22 May 1949 (age 77); Gdynia, Poland
- Occupation: Actress
- Years active: 1963–present
- Spouse: Derek Lister (m. 1977)

Ania Marson (born 22 May 1949) is an Anglo-Polish actress. Her roles include playing the Grand Duchess Olga Nikolaevna of Russia in Nicholas and Alexandra (1971), and the demon Voleth Meir, 'the Deathless Mother' in The Witcher (2021).

== Early life ==
Ania Marson was born Anna Bujniewicz on 22 May 1949, in Gdynia, Pomorskie Voivodeship, Poland. She studied acting at the Corona Stage Academy.

== Career ==
In 1963, Marson appeared on television in the series Dixon of Dock Green, then in other series such as The Troubleshooters in 1968 and Detective in 1969. In the 1970s, she appeared in Puppet on a Chain, and Nicholas and Alexandra in 1971, in which she played the Grand Duchess Olga Nikolaevna of Russia. She subsequently appeared in Emma in 1972, The Abdication (1974), Blake's 7 (1978). and Bad Timing in 1980.

In 2011 she appeared as Diana in Home Death, directed by Fiona Morrell, at the Finborough Theatre. In 2015, after a twenty-five year absence from film and television, she appeared as Olga Kowalski in an episode of Foyle's War.

In 2021, she played the demon Voleth Meir, 'the Deathless Mother' which feeds on misery, pain, and hate, in season two, for five episodes of The Witcher, alongside Anya Chalotra.

== Family ==
Ania Marson married director Derek Lister on 3 September 1977. They have two daughters.

== Filmography ==
=== Film ===
Year	Title	Role	Notes
1970	Puppet on a Chain	Astrid Lemay	
1971	Nicholas and Alexandra	Olga	
1974	The Abdication	Ebba Sparre	
1980	Bad Timing	Dr. Schneider	
1990	Luba	Luba (voice)	
2012	The Parachute Ball	Lilly	Short
2015	The Amityville Playhouse	Celia Nightingale	
2015	Howl	Jenny	
2016	Heretiks	Sister Elizabeth	
2016	Don't Knock Twice	Mary Aminov	
2016	If You Can Dream It	Marcia	Short
2017	2036: Nexus Dawn	Lawmaker No. 4	Short
2017	Sunburn	Matron	Post-production
2022	See How They Run	Mother	
2023	Unwelcome	Mother Redcap	

=== Television ===
Year	Title	Role	Notes
1963	Dixon of Dock Green	Tessa Baker Ellis	"A Strange Affair"
1968	Dixon of Dock Green	Ania Green / Nora King	"Ania", "Find the Lady"
1968	The Troubleshooters	Angelica	"The Day the Sea Caught Fire"
1969	Armchair Theatre	Jenny Brophy	"The Brophy Story"
1969	Z-Cars	Nurse	"Allegation: Part 1"
1969	Detective	Pamela Bryce	"Elimination Round"
1970	Special Branch	Karin	"Not to Be Trusted"
1971	Casanova	Anne Roman-Coupier	TV miniseries
1972	Play of the Month	Jessica	"The Merchant of Venice"
1972	Emma	Jane Fairfax	TV miniseries
1972	The Strauss Family	Olga Smithitska	"Josef"
1975	Moll Flanders	Phillipa	TV film
1976	Victorian Scandals	Katie Cook	"The Frontiers of Science"
1976	Within These Walls	Sarah	"Islands in the Heartline"
1977	Leap in the Dark	Ilse Lindgren	"The Fetch"
1977	Supernatural	Dorabella	"Dorabella"
1977	Marie Curie	Madame Kavalska	TV miniseries
1977	Target	Ros	Recurring role - 5 episodes
1978	Blake's 7	Geela	"The Web"
1988	Screenplay	Dr. Wilson	"Eskimos Do It"
1990	Screen Two	Lazareva	"Small Zones"
2015	Foyle's War	Olga Kowalski	"Trespass"
2015	Midwinter of the Spirit	Mrs. Joy	TV miniseries - All 3 episodes
2016	Home Fires	Mrs. Esposito	"2.1"
2017	Silent Witness	Grace Hockney	"Discovery: Part 2"
2017	Doctors	Mrs. Sue Dryden	"Do Geese See God?"
2018	Killing Eve	Ethel Rubynovitch	"Nice Face"
2019 & 2021	Ghosts	Lady Heather Button	"Who Do You Think You Are" & "A Lot to Take In"
2021	The Witcher	Voleth Meir, 'the Deathless Mother'	Season 2 - 5 episodes
2025	The Wheel of Time	Older Latra Posae Decume	"The Road to the Spear"
