= Privates on Parade (film) =

- Directed by: Michael Blakemore
- Written by: Peter Nichols
- Based on: the stage play by Peter Nichols
- Produced by: Simon Relph
- Starring: John Cleese; David Bamber; Denis Quilley; Bruce Payne
- Cinematography: Ian Wilson
- Edited by: Jim Clark
- Music by: Denis King
- Production companies: HandMade Films; Orion Classics
- Distributed by: Orion Pictures
- Release date: 18 March 1983
- Running time: 113 minutes
- Country: United Kingdom
- Language: English
- Budget: £1.9 million

Privates on Parade is a 1983 British black comedy film directed by Michael Blakemore and starring John Cleese, Denis Quilley and Nicola Pagett. It was written by Peter Nichols adapted from his 1977 play of the same name about a fictional and mostly gay military entertainment group, the "Song and Dance Unit South East Asia (SADUSEA)" assembled to entertain the troops in the Malayan jungle during the Malayan Emergency.

== Plot ==
During the Malayan Emergency a young British soldier, Stephen, joins an entertainment unit which performs for the troops. Its members include the very camp Captain Terri Dennis, a part-Indian woman Sylvia Morgan, and Sgt Major Drummond who is selling guns to the Communists.

== Cast ==
- John Cleese as Maj. Giles Flack
- Denis Quilley as Capt. Terri Dennis
- Nicola Pagett as Sylvia Morgan
- Patrick Pearson as Sgt. Steven Flowers
- Michael Elphick as Sgt. Maj. Reg Drummond
- David Bamber as Sgt. Charles Bishop
- Bruce Payne as Flight Sgt. Kevin Cartwright
- Tim Barlow as Commanding Officer
- Ishaq Bux as Sikh doorman
- Steve Dixon as drummer
- David Griffin as Infantry Officer in the bush
- Peter Hutchinson as trumpet player
- Jasper Jacob as bass player
- Simon Jones as Sgt. Eric Young-Love
- Brigitte Kahn as Mrs. Reg Drummond
- Robin Langford as electrician
- Joe Melia as Sgt. Len Bonny
- William Parker as armed escort
- Neil Pearson as band pianist
- John Quayle as Capt. Henry Cox
- Julian Sands as sailor
- John Standing as Capt. Sholto Savory
- Philip Tan as Lee
- Vincent Wong as Cheng

== Production ==
The original stage play debuted successfully in 1977. Film rights were bought by HandMade Films which financed the movie. According to Ray Cooper of HandMade, the film was a passion project of Denis O'Brien, who owned the company with George Harrison.

O'Brien wanted to star all members of Monty Python in the lead roles. They refused except for John Cleese, who agreed to play the part originated by Nigel Hawthorne on stage. Cleese said "Nichols has the gift for making audiences rolling in the aisles one second and hovering on the verge of tears the next."

The budget was originally reported being £1.5 million. Many people associated with the stage production were brought on to the film, including actors Denis Quilley, Joe Melia and Simon Jones, writer Peter Nichols and director Michael Blakemore. Blakemore had not directed a feature before but got the job in part due to the enthusiasm of John Cleese who called him "a storyteller who understands plot and character and the need for form and logic in a script."

Blakemore said the script made some key changes from the play (which he called "a series of music hall sketches") by "taking up one stray narrative thread that was just hanging there in the play." This was the plot about a sergeant major who was selling weapons to the communists. "The music sketches now make more sense," said Blakemore. "The tighter construct makes stronger the points that Peter wanted to make in the play. It is all the more shocking."

Filming started May 1982. It was entirely shot in England, locations including Alderton Army base, and studio work done at Shepperton. Filming coincided with the Falklands War. Blakemore later said "we made what amounts to a war musical, including action sequences, in 11 weeks for less than £2 million."

According to editor Jim Clark "Blakemore did a good workmanlike job on the film and was well advised by the people around him but, somehow or other, it was never quite as funny as it should have been."

In order to help the movie, Denis O'Brien requested some additional footage be shot of John Cleese. According to Clark, "Denis even persuaded him into doing some silly walks which, he thought, foolishly, would make the film more commercial. This was all slightly over Blakemore’s dead body. There were rows. The relationship between Blakemore and Denis O’Brien became very bad and [producer] Simon Relph was in the middle of it all as, indeed, was I."

== Reception ==
=== Critical ===
The Monthly Film Bulletin wrote: "Nichols' satire, which is punctuated as it was on the stage by well executed musical parodies from the war years, is unabashedly old world. ... The film's blimpish, damn-fool Company Commander (John Cleese in over-familiar guise), and its sense of rollicking good fun (the boys shin over Terri's veranda balustrade for a fling at Raffles Hotel), lack a contemporary edge. ... Blakemore's adaptation does, beneath the farcical goings-on, have a ring of authenticity. It is much more than Dad's Army and It Ain't Half Hot, Mum; less TV sitcom than Every Man in His Humour."

Boxoffice wrote: "One must really appreciate British humor in order to enjoy this black comedy that pokes fun at the unsettling topic of war. There are moments of hilarity, but they are sparse and by no means as powerful as the brief, tear-jerking melodrama that comes near the end. ... The film has some funny moments, the best of which are take offs on show-biz greats such as Fred and Ginger, the Andrews Sisters and Carmen Miranda. There's a nice snatch of '40s-style editing as the show goes on the jungle road. The movie is a combination of La Cage Aux Folles, M*A*S*H and Monty Python, though the combination is not nearly as successful as any of the separate elements."

Variety wrote: "Apparently, one is expected to laugh at this old world view of homosexuality while also working up sympathy for those partaking of it, especially when the alternative is straightlaced traditionalist John Cleese. Unfortunately, all the characters remain nothing but caricatures, so one is totally unprepared for the abrupt turn ensuing from an attack on all these drag queens by insurgent communists. Unless precisely the right tone has been established, comedy and death make for an uneasy mix, and director Michael Blakemore (who staged the original Royal Shakespeare Co production of the piece) hasn't created an acceptable balance in which the picture's disparate elements can reasonably coexist."

Marjorie Bilbow wrote in Screen International: "Peter Nichols's special talent for making us laugh till we cry real tears is seen here at its most guileful; the human tragedies of loneliness are concealed behind the high camp badinage, and the physical sufferings of war are presented as the pratfalls in a knockabout farce. ... Denis Quilley, superb as Captain Terri, gives a performance of faultless observation with every shrug and self-mocking pout precisely right as part of the defence mechanism of homosexual theatricals before it was legally O.K. to be gay. John Cleese, in spite of the Pythonesque echoes of his funny-walking Major, never lets the caricature take over wholly from the well meaning innocent. Michael Blakemore, making his film debut as a director, opens up the action not more than plot credibility makes essential and wisely concerns himself more with the camera's ability to capture the intimacies and subtleties of unspoken thoughts which are too easily lost in a live theatre."

Derek Winnert wrote that "there are some good jokes and songs, but Privates on Parade is sometimes a bit dodgy and dated, and the lurch into serious drama at the end works no better on film than it did on stage".

In the New York Times Vincent Canby described the film as "fine, witty, extremely self-assured [and] something seldom seen in movies-a melodramatic farce that comes complete with songs, dances, lewd jokes, sudden death, teary sentiment and smashing performances".

CGIII.com stated that Privates on Parade was "better suited to the theatre".

Michael Palin saw the film at the cinema and recorded his impressions in his diary:

The concert party numbers are well done and, as they were at the core of the stage success, are performed with panache and attractive skill by Denis Quilley and S Jones and others. Cleese and Michael Elphick are impressive at first, but gradually the film is dragged down. Relationships are hinted at, briefly consummated, then dropped just as they might have been getting interesting and Cleesey becomes saddled with the unenviable task of providing comedy as a palliative for all the floundering ‘serious’ realities of war at the end. He ends up with a desperate silly walk in the closing credits — as if finally confirming that the film is supposed to be a comedy, despite the balls being shot off, etc, etc.

John Cleese later observed, "I think the trouble was that every single person working on it didn't really know anything about film. We're talking about Peter Nichols, Michael Blakemore, who is a great director and writer, and myself — I don't think any one of the three of us really knew what we were doing vis-a-vis film. An important learning experience — a shame, because it was a great stage play."

Jim Clark, who edited, wrote "As a film, it didn’t really quite work. As a stage production it had been stylised and worked well. Denis Quilley was wonderful in both the play and the film but in the play he’d been the lead and because of John Cleese, Quilley’s part suffered. I also think that Denis O’Brien was disturbed by the homosexuality of Quilley’s character."

=== Box office ===
The film was a commercial disappointment. In December 1983 Denis O'Brien announced he expected it was the first movie from HandMade Films to lose money.

John Cleese later said that he felt the movie:

Being sort of antiwar not so many years after Vietnam, might have a chance in America, and it shows how wildly unrealistic it was. I don't think it was very good. I think I learned a great deal about why scripts work and don't work from that — that didn't even work well in Australia, the only thing I've ever done that didn't really work in Australia.

Michael Palin wrote in his diary on 15 October 1983 of a meeting with Denis O'Brien where the poor commercial performance of Privates on Parade was discussed which O'Brien "now largely ascribes to arrogance on the part of Simon Relph [the producer] and Blakemore. Again I mistrust DO’B’s view of history — surely he wasn’t forced into doing Privates, it was his scheme."

== Notes ==
- Clark, Jim (2010). Dream repairman : adventures in film editing. LandMarc Press.
- Palin, Michael (2011). Halfway to Hollywood : diaries 1980-1988. Thomas Dunne Books.
