= John Tydeman =

English producer (1936–2020)

John Tydeman OBE
- Born: John Peter Tydeman; 30 March 1936
- Died: 1 April 2020 (aged 84)
- Education: Trinity College, Cambridge
- Occupations: producer and director
- Known for: head of BBC Radio Drama (1986–1994)

John Peter Tydeman OBE (30 March 1936 – 1 April 2020) was an English producer of radio and director of theatre plays. He was responsible for commissioning and directing the early plays of Caryl Churchill, Joe Orton, Tom Stoppard and Sue Townsend.

Tydeman was the head of BBC Radio Drama from 1986 to 1994.

== Education and military service ==
Tydeman was educated at Hertford Grammar School and Trinity College, Cambridge. He served as a 2nd Lieutenant in the 1st Singapore Regiment of the Royal Artillery in Malaya, 1954–1956.

== Early BBC career ==
Even before joining the BBC as a general trainee, following his graduation from Trinity in 1959, Tydeman had received a credit on the BBC Third Programme, as an actor. He appeared in the radio broadcast of the Cambridge University Marlowe Society’s production of Christopher Marlowe's Edward II. Tydeman played the Archbishop of Canterbury in a cast led by Derek Jacobi as Edward II, and student contemporaries including John Drummond, Clive Swift and Richard Cottrell, directed by Trinity alumnus Toby Robertson. Edward II was broadcast on 31 March 1959, and Tydeman joined the BBC as a general trainee later in the year, working in various parts of the corporation, until he settled into the Radio Drama department. There he would cut his teeth on productions that would include many episodes of the popular radio soap, The Dales, as well as forays into the classics. His first radio production credit in drama was Operation Toothless, by Tom Waldron, on the BBC Home Service on 20 July 1959.

Within four years, he would establish himself as one of the most dynamic new talents in radio drama, progressing through soap opera and the relentless demand for popular afternoon entertainment to the challenges of Jean Genet’s The Maids (with Sian Phillips), and working with many of the leading actors of the time, from radio stalwarts such as Mary Wimbush to rising talents such as Michael Bryant and John Wood.

He also put his hand to adapting works such as Rudyard Kipling's Kim, Henry James's The Turn of the Screw and Jane Austen's Emma. Among the writers he would produce were David Rudkin, Cries from Casement as His Bones are Brought to Dublin (1973), Edward Bond (Narrow Road to the Deep North), William Trevor (Scenes from an Album) and David Cregan and Tom Stoppard on many occasions. Although Caryl Churchill’s first play for radio, The Ants (produced by Michael Bakewell, was broadcast three times in 1962-63, the recording was not retained in the BBC Archives. For Churchill, as for Stoppard, the freedom of the radio form was significant in the development of their writing. Churchill's work with Tydeman shows an unfettered imagination at work. The plays Identical Twins, Shreber's Nervous Illness, Henry's Past, Abortive, Not, Not, Not, Not, Not Enough Oxygen and Perfect Happiness do survive in the BBC, and foreshadow the freedom and discipline of her later stage work. Kenneth Haigh’s performance as twin brothers in Identical Twins, a 'duologue', is a tour-de-force of radio acting and writing.

== Association with Joe Orton ==
Early in his BBC career, Tydeman became inextricably linked with Joe Orton, whom he was widely seen to have discovered. Tydeman saw his championing of Orton as more of a successful rescue from the rejection pile, as he recorded his memories for the BBC at the time of retirement as Head of Radio Drama in 1994.

"The truth of that particular story is that I was in the Drama Department, very fresh from university, on an attachment basis as a trainee and a very extraordinary fresh script arrived, which was about to be sent back ... It wasn't like anything else I'd read. It was called The Boy Hairdresser ... By some chance I read it, and I went to Donald McWhinnie, who was then Assistant Head of the radio drama department, and I said, 'I think it's remarkable, I think it's quite wrong that it should be sent back.' Donald read it and said, 'Yes, there's a talent here. Why don't you see the young man'?"

Tydeman also told that story to Brian Jarman of the Fitzrovia News in 2011, in an interview when he was still living in his flat in Great Titchfield Street, parallel to BBC Broadcasting House where he had worked for more than 30 years. He talked about Orton's first appearance at Broadcasting House: "Joe was wearing bovver boots and khaki. He said he'd just come out of prison. He'd been had up for defacing library books. He was revolutionary. I was a bit daunted."

Orton had been released from prison in September, 1962, where he had written much of The Boy Hairdresser, the first script he had written independently of collaborations with his lover, Kenneth Halliwell. The couple had been sent to different prisons for the same offence of defacing library books.

After the script's journey through the radio drama department, Tydeman then guided it through three revisions, and when Orton came in to discuss the final draft, now called The Ruffian on the Stair, he presented Tydeman with a new script. As Tydeman tells it on the BBC History website, Orton said, "I don't think it's a radio play."

Tydeman flicked through it: it was Entertaining Mr Sloane. "I was just dazzled by what I saw. 'Have you got an agent?' And he said, 'No. I haven't' and I said, 'The best agent is, in my opinion, is Margaret Ramsay, Peggy Ramsay. Get in touch with her, say that I sent you. And she can be a bit of a cow. But if the chemistry's right, it'll be terrific'."

"About a week later the phone rang, and it was Peggy, and Peggy Ramsay and I had a very good relationship, and she said, 'What's this, darling? You've been calling me a cow all around London'."

"I said, I’ve done no such thing, Peggy. 'Yes, you have. A young man came to see and he said you said I was a cow. I may be a perfect bitch at times, but I'm not a cow. Darling, it's absolutely brilliant. I’ve been on to Michael Codron and we’re going to put it on in eight weeks'. "

"And they got that play on in at the Arts Theatre, directed by Patrick Dromgoole, before I got the radio play on. I would say it was about ten weeks of Joe Orton having been in my office that they got the play on. As a result of that, Joe and I remained friends all of his short life."

Entertaining Mr Sloane opened at the Arts Theatre, London, on 6 May 1964. The Ruffian on the Stair was first broadcast on the Third Programme on 31 August 1964, with the 19-year-old actor Kenneth Cranham as the ‘ruffian’.

== Later BBC career ==
One of the most prolific of radio directors, Tydeman directed 27 of Rhys Adrian’s more than 30 plays for radio, including the Prix Italia winning Evelyn (1970) and Prix Futura winning The Clerks (1979). (Michael Bakewell directed five of Adrian's plays, and Ronald Mason directed two.)

He commissioned and directed Sue Townsend’s first Mole script for BBC Radio 4, when the character was still known as Nigel, in The Diary of Nigel Mole Aged 13 ¾. It was Tydeman who brought Townsend together with the publisher Methuen after that first broadcast. Adrian's correspondence with a fictionalised version of Tydeman after submitting his poetry efforts to the BBC is a long-term feature of Townsend's Mole novels.

Tydeman became Assistant Head, Radio Drama (AHDR) in 1979, and succeeded Ronald Mason as Head of Radio Drama (HDR) in 1986. He retired from the BBC in 1994, but continued to produce radio plays as an independent.

== Other activities and honours ==
Tydeman's association with Peggy Ramsay continued after he introduced her to Joe Orton. After Ramsay died in 1991 he became a trustee for the Peggy Ramsay Foundation, leading to his continued support for new writing after he left the BBC, particularly through administering the Foundation's annual grant to the Pearson Playwrights' Scheme, (originally the Thames Television Theatre Writers Scheme and later to become the Channel 4 Playwrights Scheme).

Tydeman's stage productions included Caryl Churchill's Objections to Sex and Violence (Royal Court Theatre, 1975), David Buck's dramatisation of Robert Nye’s Falstaff (Fortune Theatre, 1984) and Emlyn Williams's Night Must Fall (Haymarket Theatre, 1996).

He was appointed Officer of the Order of the British Empire (OBE) in the 2003 New Year Honours for services to radio broadcasting. He received numerous other awards, including the Radio Academy’s Lifetime Achievement Award for 2010.

Tydeman died from COVID-19 in April 2020.
