= Afore Night Come =

1962 play written by David Rudkin

Afore Night Come is a 1962 British play written by David Rudkin, first staged by the Royal Shakespeare Company. The subject matter of the play meant that any production in a public theatre would probably have been vetoed by the Lord Chamberlain, so the RSC mounted the play at the members-only Arts Theatre. As a result of the widespread critical acclaim that the play received, Rudkin was awarded the Evening Standard Drama Award for most promising playwright of 1962.

The play is set in an orchard in the Black Country region of England's Midlands. Two young men and a tramp arrive one morning looking for work picking fruit, but as the day wears on there is violence and bloodshed. Rudkin harks back to a pagan era where the crops were fertilised by human blood. Kenneth Tynan, reviewing the play in The Observer, wrote "Not since Look Back In Anger has a playwright made a debut more striking than this."

When writing programme notes for the revival of the play at the Young Vic in 2001, Rudkin explained that he was afraid that no-one would ever stage the play, firstly because of its coarse language, but also "because I needed to thread through this dark story a counter-element of desire and love to off-set the rage and hatred - and there weren't any girls working in this company, and in any case the rage and hatred were all very male, the desire had to be male as well, inevitably making it have to be homosexual, which according to the laws of the time meant that the play could never be publicly staged. And the logical moral outcome of the play's process would be a climactic act of violence of a sort that I don't think had been done on an English stage since the Jacobeans. So I had to choose: back off and not follow the logical implications of the play; or go through with it and be damned. If I was going to be a writer, there wasn't any choice."
