= Ian Fairbairn (actor) =

English actor (1931–2014)

- Born: Ian Fulton Fairbairn; 17 September 1931; West Derby, Liverpool, England
- Died: 2 December 2014 (aged 83); Chiswick, London, England
- Education: Rose Bruford College
- Occupation: Actor
- Years active: 1960–2006 (film & TV)

Ian Fairbairn (17 September 1931 – 2 December 2014) was an English actor who was a regular in children's science fiction programme Timeslip (in the dual roles of Alpha 4 and Dr. Frazer), as well as being a popular choice for director Douglas Camfield.

His first acting role was playing a lady in waiting in Saint Joan while at Mill Hill School in London. Following National Service, Fairbairn worked in the city for a while before winning a scholarship to the Rose Bruford College of Speech and Drama. This led to working at Farnham Repertory and then numerous television appearances.

He appeared in the TV series Softly, Softly, Z-Cars, Paul Temple, Play for Today, The Onedin Line, The Professionals, Dramarama and Last of the Summer Wine plus others.

He appeared in the Doctor Who stories The Macra Terror (1967), The Invasion (1968), Inferno (1970) and The Seeds of Doom (1976) - the latter three for Camfield.

Fairbairn liked to keep documentation of his various TV work including the only original copies of Timeslip scripts known to exist.
