= The Georgian House =

1976 British children's TV series

- Genre: Children's fantasy
- Written by: Jill Laurimore; Harry Moore
- Directed by: Derek Clark; Leonard White; Sebastian Robinson; Rayan Salvi
- Starring: Spencer Banks; Adrienne Byrne; Brinsley Forde; Jack Watson; Constance Chapman
- Country of origin: United Kingdom
- Original language: English
- No. of series: 1
- No. of episodes: 7

Production
- Executive producer: Patrick Dromgoole
- Producer: Leonard White
- Camera setup: Multi-camera
- Running time: c. 25 minutes per episode

Original release
- Network: ITV (HTV)
- Release: 2 January – 13 February 1976

The Georgian House is a British children's fantasy television series produced by HTV and first screened on ITV in 1976. The series consisted of seven episodes.

The story concerns two teenagers who go to work as tour guides at a Georgian house in Bristol but are transported back to 1772. The action takes place as a mix of the modern day intertwined with the 18th century. The series was written by Jill Laurimore and Harry Moore and produced by Leonard White.

Today, only three episodes exist in the archives.

== Plot ==
The story concerned two students, Dan and Abbie, who arrive at a recently refurbished Georgian House in Bristol, which is open for guided tours. They work there as tour guides along with the caretaker. While there, they discover an African wood carving which takes hold of the teenagers and transports them back 200 years to a time when the house was owned by the Leadbetter family. They are accepted as part of the household as Abbie is seen as a visiting cousin and Dan is a bullied houseboy. While there, they meet a young Negro slave, Ngo who is owned by the Leadbetters. Abbie is desperate to set him free, but Dan is keen to get back to their own time. They discover that Ngo is the only one who can help them get back and they work together. Abbie and Dan succeed in setting Ngo free and they make it back to their own time.

== Background ==
The series was written by acclaimed author Jill Laurimore and producer/writer Harry Moore. The series was produced by Leonard White. The original commission from HTV was to be set in the West Country, consist of seven episodes and no more than four sets with no location work. The series was to be shot solely on videotape.

The serial was needed urgently and so Laurimore and Moore had to come up with the plot and seven scripts quite quickly. Laurimore had spent time in Bristol as a child and had been to visit the Geogian House in Bristol several times and had been fascinated by it. Given the restrictive nature of just four sets, she came up with the idea to set it across two time zones, the 1970s and the 1770s using the same sets. Originally it was planned that the house would be given a generic name to distance itself from the real location, but HTV were keen to tie it to the real house in Bristol, which at that time was conducting guided tours. The real drawing room and hallways were recreated in the studio with meticulous detail. Laurimore lamented that with all the money spent on the sets, they could have used some of it for a few location scenes which she felt would improve the production.

Of the cast, the two teenage leads were played by Spencer Banks, who had made his name earlier in the decade as Simon in the science-fiction series, Timeslip, while Abbie was played by 19-year old actress Adrienne Byrne. Well known actor Jack Watson played the Caretaker. Playing the slave boy Ngo, child actor Brinsley Forde was cast. (Forde later became more famous as a member of 1980s reggae-pop group, Aswad). Characters from the 18th-century were: Peter Scofield (Leadbetter), Constance Chapman (Mistress Anne), Janine Duvitski (Ariadne), Valerie Lush (Lady Cecilia), Monica Lavers (Maid), Anne Blake (Madame Lavarre), Stephen Holton (Footman), Dudley Jones (Hezekiah Allsop), and Anna Quayle (Miss Humphreys) .

The Stage newspaper said that the series was "visually rich, sumptuously produced [and] a quality production".

== Episodes ==
| No. | Title | First broadcast |
|---|---|---|
| 1 | "New Recruits" | 2 January 1976 |
| 2 | "We'll Never Get Back" | 9 January 1976 |
| 3 | "Treachery" | 16 January 1976 |
| 4 | "A Dose of Sulphur Water" | 23 January 1976 |
| 5 | "Duwamba" | 30 January 1976 |
| 6 | "Trapped" | 6 February 1976 |
| 7 | "Look to Your Future" | 13 February 1976 |

== Availability ==
Today, only two episodes of the series exist in the HTV archive. These are episodes 1 and 7, with the remaining five believed to have been wiped. Since then, a home-recorded videotape of episode 3 has come to light. Despite its only partial existence, archive TV specialists Network DVD released the three remaining episodes on a single DVD on 24 May 2010. PDF files of the scripts represented the 'lost' episodes 2, 4, 5 and 6 allowing the narrative to be understood.
