= Penda's Fen =

- Play for Today episode
- Home video cover
- Episode no.: Series 4 Episode 16
- Directed by: Alan Clarke
- Written by: David Rudkin
- Original air date: 21 March 1974

Episode chronology
← Previous "Headmaster"	Next → "Pidgeon - Hawk Or Dove?"

"Penda's Fen" is a British television play that was originally broadcast on 21 March 1974. Written by David Rudkin and directed by Alan Clarke, it was the 16th episode of the fourth series of the BBC anthology series Play for Today.

== Plot ==
Set around the village of Pinvin in Worcestershire, England, the play is an evocation of conflicting forces within England past and present: authority, tradition, hypocrisy, landscape, art, sexuality, and, most of all, its mystical and ancient pagan past. All of this comes together in the growing pains of the adolescent Stephen, a vicar's son, whose encounters include angels, Edward Elgar and King Penda.

Stephen is a devout Anglican traditionalist, believing in the sanctity of marriage and that the role of a family should be to raise children. Stephen begins to experience visions of angels and demons, as well as homoerotic visions featuring boys of his school class. These cast doubt within him, including in his decision to enlist in the army. On his 18th birthday, Stephen learns that he was adopted, and this begins in him a sea change wherein he starts to accept his own hypocrisies and idiosyncrasies.

The final scene of the play, in which Stephen has an apparitional experience of King Penda and the "mother and father of England", is set on the Malvern Hills.

== Cast ==
- Spencer Banks as Stephen Franklin
- John Atkinson as Reverend J. Franklin
- Georgine Anderson as Mrs. Franklin
- Ron Smerczak as Joel
- Ian Hogg as Arne
- Jennie Heslewood as Mrs. Arne
- Graham Leaman as Sir Edward Elgar
- Geoffrey Staines as King Penda
- Christopher Douglas as Honeybone

== Music ==
Music from Elgar's The Dream of Gerontius is used throughout the play. The 1971 Decca recording by Benjamin Britten with Yvonne Minton as the Angel is used, and the album itself features as a prop. Extracts from Elgar's Introduction and Allegro are also heard.

Original music is by Paddy Kingsland of the BBC Radiophonic Workshop, who also electronically manipulated parts of the Britten recording.

== Reception ==
Critics have noted that the play stands apart from Clarke's other, more realist output. Clarke admitted that he did not fully understand what the story was about. The play has gone on to acquire the status of minor classic, to win awards and to be rebroadcast several times by the BBC. Following the original broadcast, Leonard Buckley wrote in The Times: "Make no mistake. We had a major work of television last night. Rudkin gave us something that had beauty, imagination and depth".

In 2006, Vertigo magazine described the play as "One of the great visionary works of English film". In 2011, it was chosen by Time Out London magazine as one of the 100 best British films. It described the play as a "multi-layered reading of contemporary society and its personal, social, sexual, psychic and metaphysical fault lines. Fusing Elgar's ‘Dream of Gerontius’ with a heightened socialism of vibrantly localist empathy, and pagan belief systems with pre-Norman histories and a seriously committed – and prescient – ecological awareness, Penda's Fen is a unique and important statement."

The play was released on limited-edition Blu-ray and DVD in May 2016. In an essay published with the release, Sukhdev Sandhu argues that the play "is, long before the term was first used to describe the work of directors such as Todd Haynes and Isaac Julien, a queer film". According to Sandhu, the play presents Stephen's discovery of his homosexuality as "a gateway drug to a new enlightenment" that "inspires heterodoxy".

== Publications ==
In June 2025, Ten Acre Books published Penda's Fen: Scene By Scene, written by Ian Greaves, which examines the play's development from script to screen.

== See also ==
- Manichaeism

== Bibliography ==
- Raby, David (1998). David Rudkin: Sacred Disobedience: an expository study of his drama 1959-96. Oxford, Routledge. ISBN 90-5702-126-9.
- Rolinson, D (2005). Alan Clarke. Manchester University Press. ISBN 0-7190-6830-4.
