= Peggy Thorpe-Bates =

British actress (1914–1989)

- Photo by Vivienne
- Born: Margaret Freda Bates; 11 August 1914; London, England
- Died: 26 December 1989 (aged 75); Stratford-upon-Avon, Warwickshire, England
- Occupation: Actress
- Years active: 1938–1983
- Spouse: Brian Oulton (m. 1938)
- Children: 2

Margaret Freda Oulton (11 August 1914 – 26 December 1989), better known by her stage name Peggy Thorpe-Bates was an English actress who appeared in the first three series of Rumpole of the Bailey as Rumpole's fearsome wife Hilda. She also appeared in numerous other supporting roles on both stage and screen.

She attended Heathfield School, the Cone School of Dancing and RADA, then appeared in repertory theatre in Birmingham, Bristol, Harrogate and with the BBC Repertory Company. Her film appearances included Georgy Girl and Mosquito Squadron. On television she had recurring roles in Timeslip and Return of the Saint. She also guest starred in Mrs Thursday, Tales of the Unexpected, and The Young Ones.

She was married to fellow actor Brian Oulton from 1938 until her death in 1989. The couple had a son and a daughter.

== Partial filmography ==
Year	Title	Role	Note
1960	Peeping Tom	Mrs. Partridge	Uncredited
1962	In the Doghouse	Mrs. Muswell	
1966	Georgy Girl	Hospital Sister	
1969	A Touch of Love	Mrs. Stacey	
1969	Mosquito Squadron	Mrs. Scott	
1970	Timeslip	Dr. Edith Joynton	(The Time of the Ice Box)
1975	Galileo	Court Lady	
1979	The Saint and the Brave Goose	Mrs. Cloonan	Edited episodes from Return of the Saint
