= Peter Fairley =

British science journalist (1930–1998)

Peter Fairley (2 November 1930 – 5 August 1998) was a British science journalist who was the Science Editor for Independent Television News and TV Times magazine the late sixties and early seventies. His name became synonymous with ITN's extensive live coverage of the Apollo Moon landing missions.

His daughter is Josephine Fairley, journalist, magazine editor and founder with her husband of Green & Black's chocolate company.

== Biography ==
His father was a telecommunications engineer. He was born in Kuala Lumpur, British Malaya, and attended Sutton Valence School, Kent and Sidney Sussex College, Cambridge and he was then the science correspondent for the London Evening Standard and made numerous radio broadcasts in the 1960s. In April 1961, while employed at the Evening Standard, Fairley, based on warnings sent to ships in the Pacific and a hunch, predicted in his column that the U.S.S.R. was about to launch its first crewed space flight. The column appeared on the front page of the paper, and two days later, Russia launched Yuri Gagarin into space. Fairley's salary was doubled as a result of his prediction. He was also a familiar face to ITV's younger viewers with regular appearances on Magpie and the children's science fiction series Timeslip as well as science articles in ITV's children's magazine Look-in, and writing books on popular science. He died of cancer aged 67.

Archive material collected by Fairley during his coverage of space missions became the basis of the Fairley Archive of Space Exploration (FASE)

== Further biographical information from the cover of The Conquest of Pain ==
Peter Fairley is Science Editor of Independent Television News, TV Times and Capital Radio. He has been reporting science and medicine for more than twenty years, and has written ten books. In 1968, he was chosen as Science Writer of the Year and awarded a Glaxo Travelling Fellowship; the award was used to finance the travelling needed to research this book.

Peter Fairley calls pain "the most fascinating and possibly the most important subject I have ever tackled".

== Bibliography ==
- Magpie's ABC of Space, Independent Television Publications, 1969 ISBN 978-0213179274
- Man on the Moon, Littlehampton Book Services, 1969
- Project X: the exciting story of British invention, Mayflower Books 1970 ISBN 0-583-11794-5
- Peter Fairley's Space Annual, 1970
- The Conquest of Pain, 1978 ISBN 0-7181-1745-X

== Notes ==
- Peter Fairley of ITN fame is not to be confused with San Francisco and British Columbia-based science writer Peter Fairley, known for his ongoing writing on energy, technology and the environment. Fairley's reporting on political interference with U.S. energy research earned Covering Climate Now’s inaugural award for investigative journalism. He was also a longtime member of the board of directors of the Society of Environmental Journalists.
