= Robin Langford =

English actor, writer and director (1953–2014)

- Born: 12 September 1953; Cheltenham, Gloucestershire, England
- Died: 22 November 2014 (aged 61)
- Occupation: Actor

Robin W. J. Langford (12 September 1953 – 22 November 2014) was an English actor, writer and director. His acting work included with the Royal Shakespeare Theatre Company in Stratford-upon-Avon; at the Moscow Arts Theatre in Russia at the age of 12; and in his first film, The Comedians, at the age of 12, as Elizabeth Taylor’s son (with Richard Burton, Sir Alec Guinness and Sir Peter Ustinov). He subsequently played many film and television roles, as well as directed in the theatre.

Notable TV credits include the leading role in a BBC adaptation of Robert Louis Stevenson's The Black Arrow; as well as appearances in The Duchess of Duke Street, Smiley's People, The Tripods and War and Peace.

== Filmography ==
Year	Title	Role	Notes
1967	The Comedians	Angelito Pineda	Uncredited
1982	The Return of the Soldier	First Young Officer	
1983	Privates on Parade	Electrician	
1983	The Keep	S.S. Kommando	
