= Louis Castex (sculptor) =

French sculptor, born 1868

- Born: December 2, 1868; Saumur, France
- Died: July 13, 1954; 15th arrondissement of Paris, France
- Education: École des Beaux-Arts de Toulouse, École nationale supérieure des Beaux-Arts (Paris)
- Known for: Sculpture

Louis Castex (December 2, 1868 - July 13, 1954) was a French sculptor.

== Early life and education ==
Louis Castex was born on December 2, 1868, in Saumur. His parents were Dulcide Castex, a military intendant from Agen, and Hélène Gazanchon de Chavannes, from a land-owning family in the Monts du Lyonnais. In 1882, his elder brother died, and Louis Castex lost his left eye in an accident. He was introduced to wood sculpture and modeling by his mother.

In 1889, Louis Castex studied sculpture under Henri Maurette (1834-1898) at the École des Beaux-Arts in Toulouse. He won the second grand prize in the municipal competition with his high relief "Timoclée appearing before Alexander," which also earned him a scholarship to enter the École nationale des Beaux-Arts in Paris the following year. He was a student of sculptors Jules Cavelier and Louis-Ernest Barrias and befriended Henri Bouchard and Paul Landowski.

== Competitions and exhibitions ==
In 1897, Louis Castex won first prize in the Chenavard competition at the École des Beaux-Arts in Paris with his high relief "The Vision of the Virgin." He also received a travel grant, allowing him to visit Italy and Spain. This work earned him a third-class medal at the 1898 Salon des Artistes Français and a bronze medal at the Exposition Universelle of 1900.

Castex participated in 28 annual editions of the Salon des Artistes Français throughout his career. In 1910, he won the second prize with his high relief "The Singers" or "Religious Music," which can be found in the cathedral Notre-Dame du Liban in Paris. He dedicated sixteen years to this sculpture, considered his masterpiece.

== Selected Works (Non-Exhaustive List) ==
Specializing in religious sculpture, Louis Castex was particularly active in the Lyon region, where he participated, like many of his colleagues, in the construction of the eight lateral chapels of the nave of the Basilica of Notre-Dame de Fourvière between 1899 and 1943. He executed the altarpiece of "The Annunciation" in 1922, initially entrusted to Jean-Baptiste Larrivé.

In collaboration with goldsmith Amédée Cateland, he created several works dedicated to the Curé of Ars for the Basilica of Saint Philomena in Ars-sur-Formans, Ain.

=== Religious subjects ===
- "Communion of Saint Stanislas Kotska," 1897, with one copy at the Musée des Beaux-Arts de Lyon and a silver-plated copper plaque at the Musée d'Orsay in Paris (c. 1902, inv. LUX M 84).
- "The Vision of the Virgin," 1897, high relief, Cathedral Notre-Dame-du-Liban in Paris.
- "Monk in Meditation," 1901, marble bust, sacristy of the Church of Notre-Dame-des-Blancs-Manteaux in Paris. Another slightly different version known as "Monk Reading" is at the Musée des Beaux-Arts in Lyon.
- "Virgin and Child" or "Our Lady of Loreto," 1902, marble, church in Sancoins (Cher). Plaster version in the church of Troissy (Cher).
- "Saint Joseph, Father of Silence," 1903, marble statue, Church of Notre-Dame-de-Bellecombe in Lyon. Patinated plaster study at the Musée des Beaux-Arts in Lyon.
- "Religious Music" or "The Singers," 1910, high relief, church Notre-Dame-du-Liban in Paris.
- "Saint Yves," 1914, marble statue, Church of Saint-Charles in Marseille.
- "Saint Yves Preaching Against the Usurer and Defending the Poor," 1914, marble bas-relief, church Saint-Charles in Marseille. Plaster study at the Charlieu Museum (Loire).
- "Tomb of Cardinal Couillé," 1917, marble statue, Cathedral of Saint John the Baptist in Lyon.
- "The Kidnapping Angel" or "The Angel with Flowers," 1917, marble bas-relief, Bagneux Cemetery in Paris.
- "Altarpiece of the Annunciation," 1922, marble bas-relief, Basilica of Notre-Dame de Fourvière in Lyon.
- "The Four Evangelists," 1924, stone statues, church of Saint-Martin-en-Haut (Rhône). Plaster versions in the church of Saint-Jean-de-Passy in Paris. Sketches at the Museum of Sacred Art in Fourvière, Lyon.
- "Saint François-Régis" and "Saint François d'Assise," 1925, bronze statuettes of the Curé of Ars shrine, with Amédée Cateland, Basilica of Saint Philomena in Ars-sur-Formans (Ain). Saint François-Régis: plaster, church of Freycinnet (Ardèche). Saint François d'Assise: stone, church of Notre-Dame-de-Bellecombe in Lyon; original tinted plaster, H. 83.5 cm, Musée de Beauvais (inv. 97.220).
- "Saint Joan of Arc," 1925, marble statue, Saint-Philibert Church in Charlieu (Loire). Terracotta sketch, H. 14 cm, Musée de Beauvais.
- "The First Communion of Little Jean-Marie Baptiste Vianney in the House of the Count of Pingon in Ecully and The Ordination of Jean-Marie Vianney to the Priesthood in the Chapel of the Grand Seminary of Grenoble on August 13, 1815," 1927, marble bas-relief, Basilica of Saint Philomena in Ars-sur-Formans (Ain).
- "Saint Thérèse of the Child Jesus," 1928, marble statue, Charlieu Museum.
- "Saint Denis," 1929, marble statue, Saint-Denis Church in Montpellier. Plaster reduction at the Museum of Sacred Art in Fourvière, Lyon.
- "Saint Thérèse of Lisieux," circa 1930, Church of the Sacred Heart in Dijon.
- "Effigy of Blessed Claude La Colombière," circa 1930, gilded bronze, with Amédée Cateland, Basilica of Paray-le-Monial (Saône-et-Loire).
- "The Sacred Heart," 1930, stone, Cathedral of Saint Charles in Saint-Étienne. Plaster version at the Church of Our Lady of Bethany in Moirans (Isère).
- "Virgin and Child," 1932, marble statue, Church of Notre-Dame-du-Port in Clermont-Ferrand. Terracotta sketch, H. 20 cm, Musée de Beauvais.
- "Saint Anthony of Padua," 1932, marble statue, Saint-Charles Church in Marseille. Plaster version at the church of Brunoy (Seine-et-Oise).
- "Priests from Around the World Pay Tribute to the Curé of Ars," 1933, marble bas-relief, Basilica of Saint Philomena in Ars-sur-Formans (Ain).
- "Monument de la Rencontre" of the Curé of Ars and the Little Shepherd, 1936, bronze statue, Ars-sur-Formans (Ain).
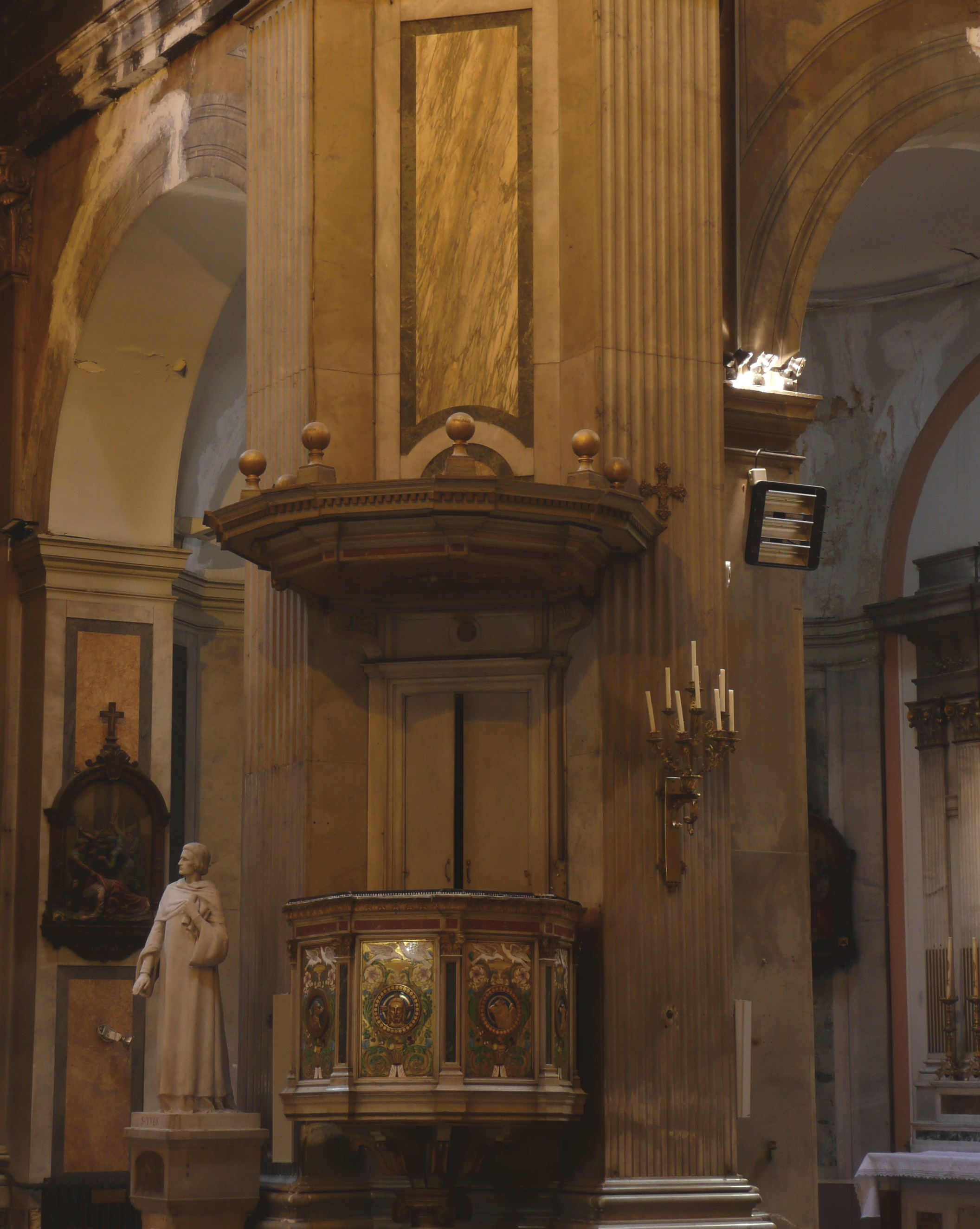
Saint Yves 1914 Louis Castex Church of Saint-Charles-Borromée (Marseille)

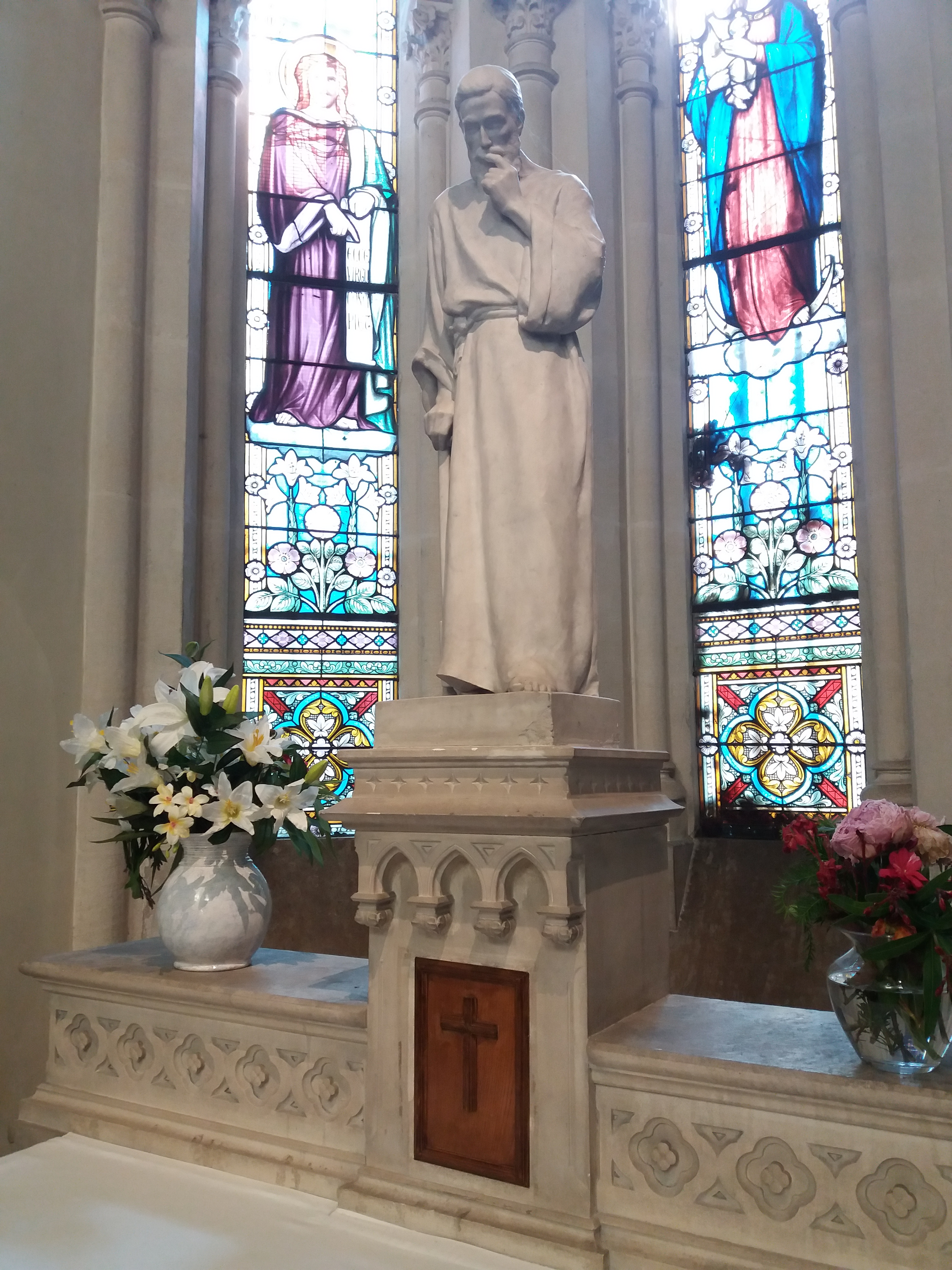
Saint Joseph 1903 Louis Castex Church of Notre-Dame-de-Bellecombe (Lyon)

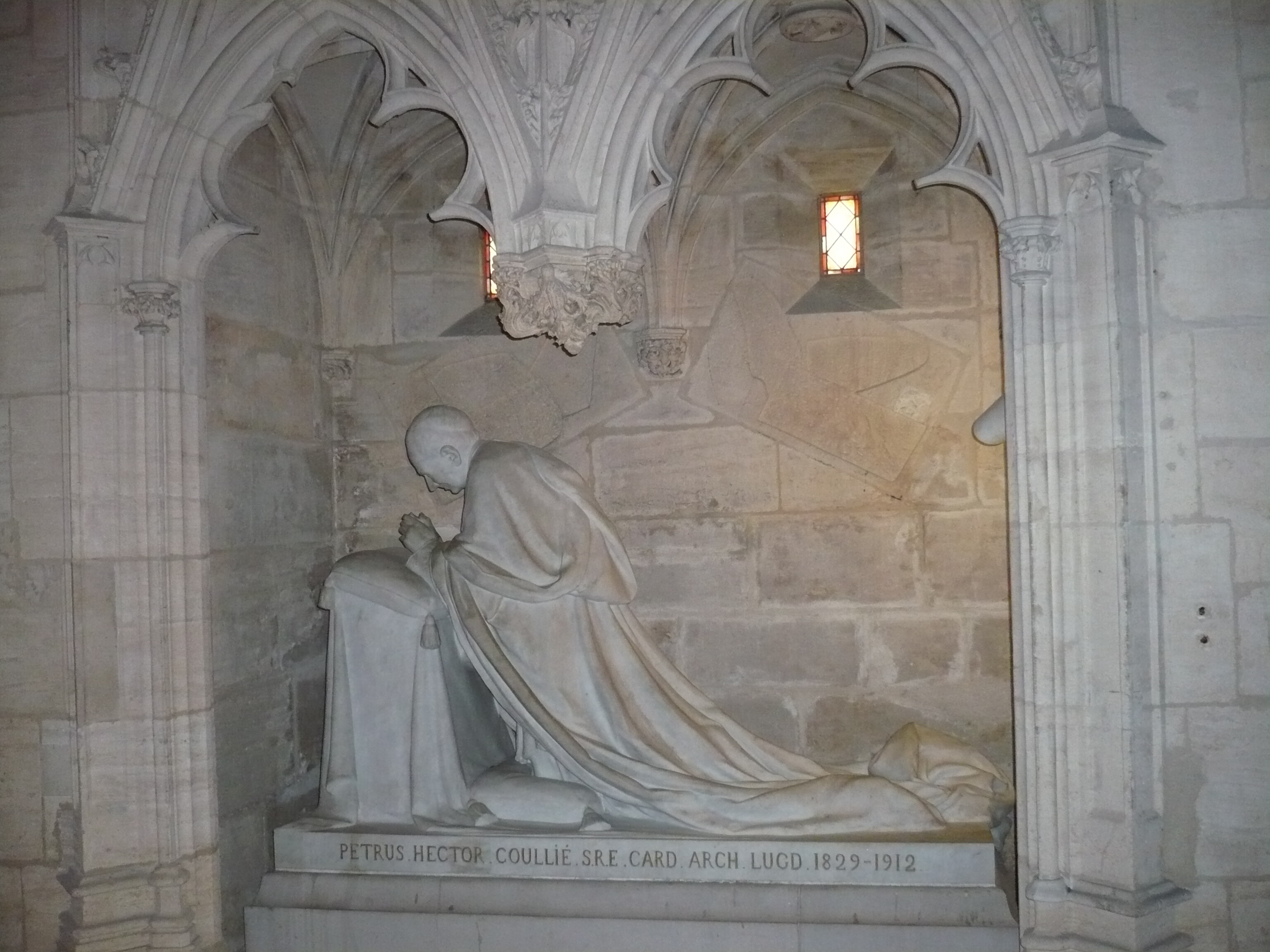
Tomb of Cardinal Couillé 1917 Louis Castex Primatiale Saint-Jean-Baptiste (Lyon)

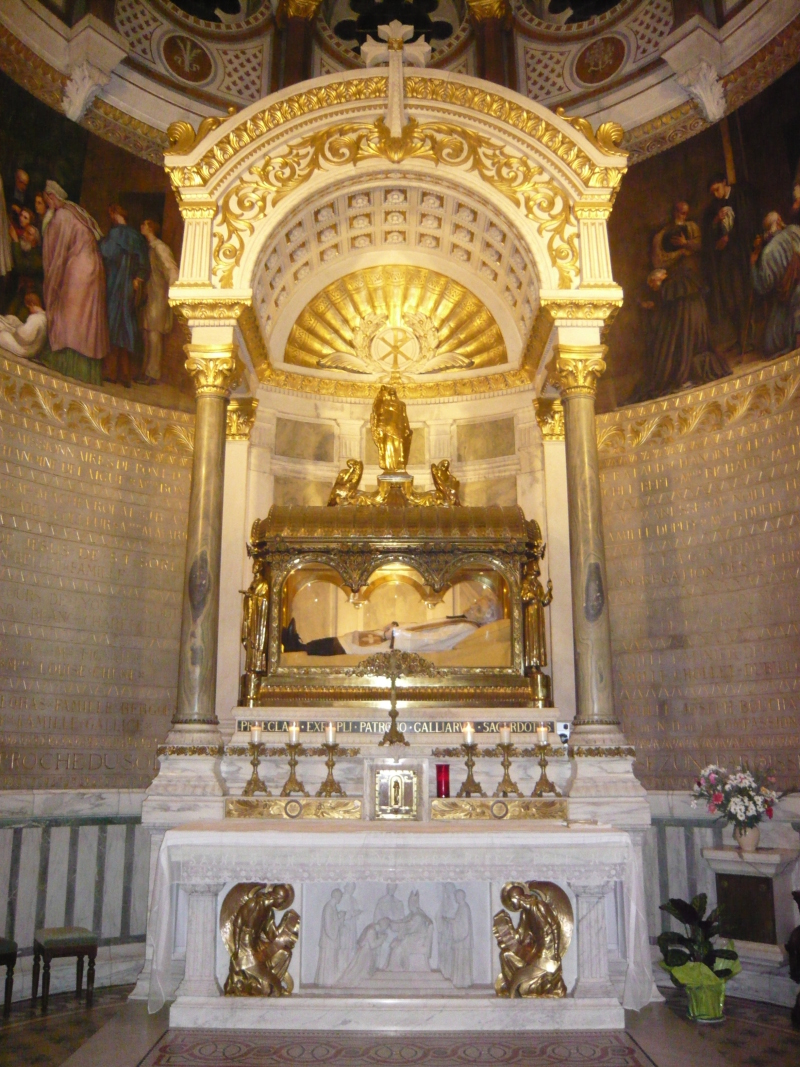
Shrine of the Curé of Ars 1925 Basilica of Saint Philomena (Ars-sur-Formans)

=== Secular subjects ===
Castex was also the author of numerous portraits and genre scenes, in relief or in the round. These depictions of characters reading or engaged in fieldwork are mainly distributed between the Musée des Beaux-Arts de Lyon and the Musée départemental de l'Oise in Beauvais.

The presence of Louis Castex's works in these two museums owes much to the active promotion of his work by his children Raoul, Marie-Hélène, and Jean-Marie, who made several donations: in 1990 and 2001 to the Musée des Beaux-Arts in Lyon (statuettes, preparatory studies, plaques, glass plates), and in 1997 to the Musée départemental de l'Oise - Beauvais, where the addition of around forty sculptures and drawings to the collections led to a temporary exhibition entirely dedicated to Louis Castex, between November 1997 and January 1998.

==== Beauvais ====
Musée Départemental de l'Oise:

- "Pierre and Georges Sanson," 1907, plaster bas-relief, inv. 77-278.
- "At the Meeting Place," 1901, patinated terracotta bas-relief, inv. 97-100.
- "The Drinker," 1901, plaster bas-relief, inv. 97-101.
- "Portrait of Hélène Castex," 1910, bas-relief, inv. 97-104.
- "Hélène Castex Sitting Knitting," 1923, patinated plaster statuette, inv. 97-108.
- "Peasant at the Open Grain Market," circa 1945-150, terracotta statuette, inv. 97-117.
- "Peasant with a Basket and a Duck," circa 1945-150, terracotta statuette, inv. 97-123.

==== Lyon ====
Musée des Beaux-Arts de Lyon:

- "Marguerite Castex Reading Standing" or "Young Woman Reading," 1908, patinated plaster bas-relief, inv. 1990-64.
- "Peasant with an Open Bag of Grains," bronze sketch, inv. 1990-66.
- "Standing Draped Man" known as "The Spaniard," terracotta sketch, inv. 1990-67.
- "Winter," 1903, enameled stoneware statuette, inv. 1990-69.
- "The Spaniard," 1905, bronze statuette, inv. 1990-70.
- "Seated Girl Reading," patinated terracotta sketch, inv. 2001-10.
- "Girl with a Doll," porcelain statuette, inv. 2001-11.
- "Girl with a Kiss," porcelain statuette, inv. 2001-12.

== Death ==
He died on July 13, 1954 in the 15th arrondissement of Paris.
