= Bill & Ted's Excellent Adventures =

Bill & Ted's Excellent Adventures may refer to:

- Bill & Ted's Excellent Adventures (1990 TV series), an animated series on CBS and Fox Kids
- Bill & Ted's Excellent Adventures (1992 TV series), a live-action series on Fox

== See also ==
- Bill & Ted's Excellent Adventure, a 1989 film
