= VSA (charity) =

Scottish social care charity

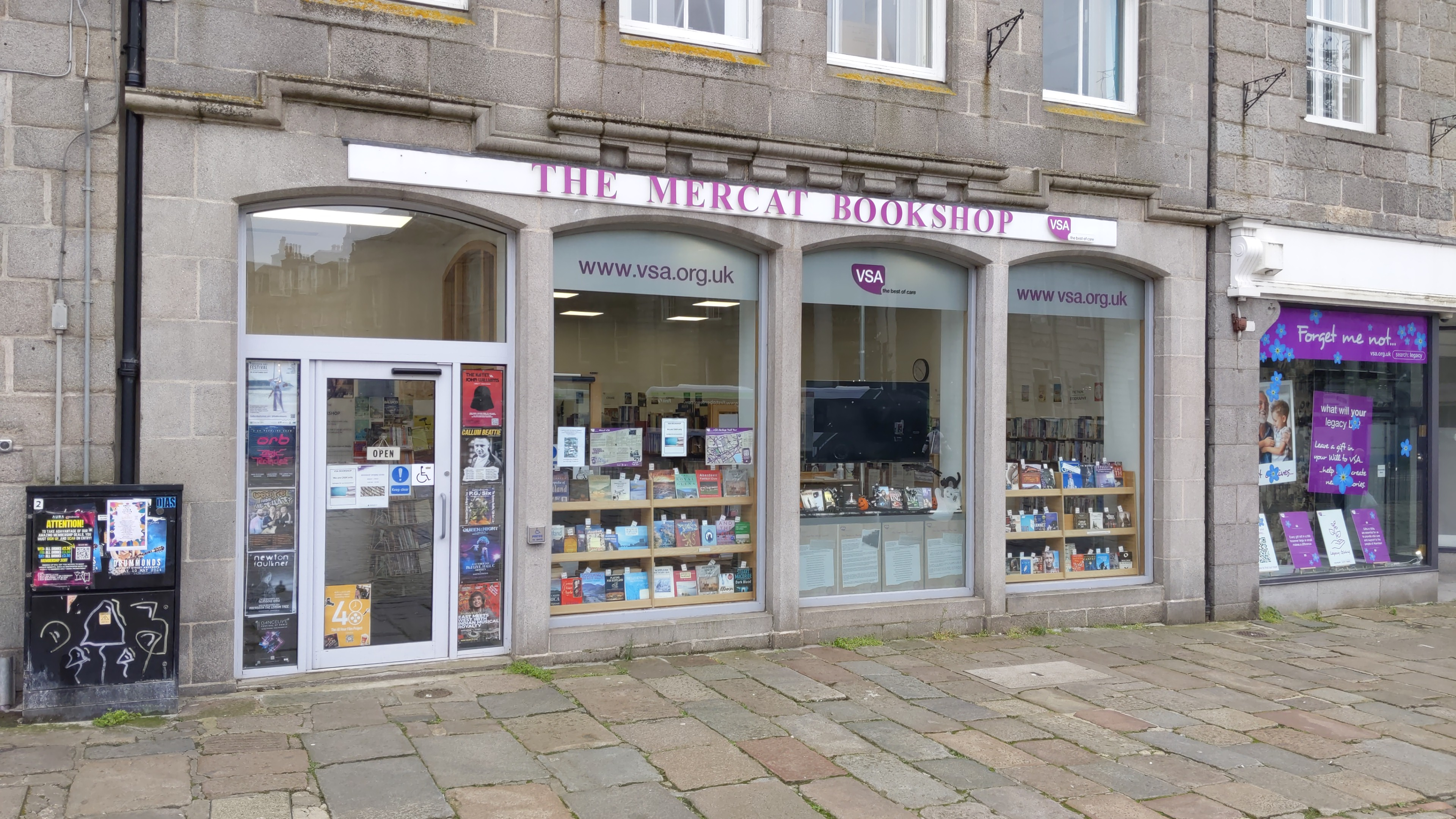
- The Mercat Bookshop, operated by VSA, pictured in 2024.
- Abbreviation: VSA
- Formation: 10 March 1870; 156 years ago
- Founder: Alexander Nicol
- Legal status: Charity
- Purpose: Social care services
- Headquarters: 38 Castle Street
- Location: Aberdeen, Scotland
- Leader: Sue Freeth
- Staff: 700+
- Website: www.vsa.org.uk
- Formerly called: Aberdeen Association for Improving the Condition of the Poor (1870–1947); Aberdeen Association of Social Service (1947–1979)

The Aberdeen Association of Social Service, trading as VSA (abbreviation of Voluntary Service Aberdeen), is a charity based in Aberdeen. Since it was first established in 1870, it has helped thousands of the most vulnerable people and their families living in communities across the North East of Scotland. Its chief executive is Sue Freeth, who assumed the role in 2023.

The charity provides vital support and services to people of all ages across four core areas: Children and Families, Adult and Community, Education and Learning, and Carers Support. VSA support a person's physical, mental, emotional and social wellbeing through a range of residential and outreach support services. VSA employs over 500 staff and has a turnover of over £15 million. Formed in 1870, VSA is one of the oldest social care charities in Scotland. The charity is made up of the merger of seven local charities over the previous century.

== Social Care Services ==
VSA runs a number of projects that provide services across the UK.

Linn Moor school is a nationally renowned school for children with special needs, specialising in using the TEACCH methodology for caring for children with autism. The charity provide school-based counselling to support young people's mental wellbeing, and provide a range of services that support children with complex and additional support needs. Linn Moor School which is run by the charity is a nationally renowned school for children with special needs.

They provide support to adults and older people, some further challenged by dementia, poor mental health or learning disability. The charity also support people on their journey to recovery from addiction. Across these services, provide care homes, housing with support, outreach, day care, carers support and activity centres.

== History ==
VSA was formed by the former Lord Provost of Aberdeen Alexander Nicol on 10 March 1870 as Aberdeen Association for Improving the Condition of the Poor. In 1899 the charity moved its offices to 38 Castle Street, Aberdeen where it remains today.

The charity changed its name to Aberdeen Association of Social Service in early 1947, and this remains its legal title. The charity traded as Voluntary Service Aberdeen from 1979 until 2006 when the title VSA was adopted. During its history the charity has been involved in the formation of several other organisations, including Aberdeen Citizens Advice Bureau, Aberdeen Children's Welfare Council, the Charities Aid Scheme, Easter Anguston Farm Training Scheme, Aberdeen Volunteer Bureau, and the Aberdeen Carers Centre.

In June 2024, the Care Inspectorate visited Ruthrieston House, a care home operated by VSA and reported several issues relating to understaffing. Sue Freeth responded to the report stating that "[VSA] have taken immediate action" and they "have worked and will continue to work closely with the Care Inspectorate and local authority".
