= Joy Worth =

Joy Worth (1910 – August 1987) was a British singer, radio presenter, and announcer, who was active during the 1940s and 1950s. Before a career on radio, she was a member of The Cavendish Three, a close harmony trio, from 1934 to 1939. Worth joined the BBC as an announcer in July 1942.

She appeared as a castaway on the BBC Radio programme Desert Island Discs on 17 Oct 1952. Worth died in August 1987 at the age of 77.
