= The Amityville Playhouse =

- Film poster
- Directed by: John R. Walker
- Screenplay by: Steve Hardy
- Story by: Steve Hardy; John R. Walker
- Produced by: John R. Walker
- Starring: Monèle LeStrat; Linden Baker; Kennie Bennoit; Hollie Anne Kornik; Eva Kwok; Logan Russell; Gary Martin; Ania Marson
- Cinematography: Matthew Hickinbottom
- Edited by: Matthew Hickinbottom
- Music by: Matthew Hickinbottom
- Production company: Scrapfilms
- Distributed by: GatebreakR
- Release date: 13 April 2015 (United Kingdom)
- Running time: 99 minutes
- Countries: Canada; United Kingdom
- Language: English

The Amityville Playhouse (also known as The Amityville Theater) is a 2015 horror film directed by John R. Walker and written by Steve Hardy. It is the thirteenth film to be inspired by Jay Anson's 1977 novel The Amityville Horror. Monèle LeStrat stars as Fawn Harriman, a recently orphaned Dannemora high school student who inherits a mysterious abandoned theatre located in Amityville, New York.

== Plot ==
Fawn Harriman, a Dannemora high school student whose parents died a year ago, inherits the Roxy, an abandoned theatre located in Amityville, New York. Fawn visits the Roxy with her friend Indy Divani, boyfriend Kyle Blaker, Kyle's bullied younger brother, Jevan, and Jevan's friend Matt Darnell while one of her teachers, Victor Stewart, looks into the history of the theatre, as well as Amityville. Fawn and her friends become trapped in the theatre, which has no cellphone service, shortly after meeting Wendy Shardlow, a runaway who has been squatting in the Roxy. After making several unsuccessful attempts at breaking out of the theatre, Fawn and the others encounter paranormal phenomena, like an apparition that resembles Fawn and a Ouija board that spells out the word "SISTER."

During the course of his research, Stewart notices that six people always die on every November 13 in Amityville. Stewart brings his findings to Elliot Saunders, the mayor of Amityville, who explains that the caves that are located beneath Amityville are a gateway to Hell that was accidentally unsealed centuries ago by the Shinnecock. The first six Shinnecock who entered the catacombs were possessed by demons, and buried alive in the caverns by the other Shinnecock. The catacombs were at some point unsealed again, and ever since a cult made up of Amityville's elite has sacrificed six people (including every elite's firstborn child) to the demons, to keep them appeased and to stop them from spreading from Amityville to the rest of the Earth. Fawn was supposed to be sacrificed to the demons alongside her twin sister, Adrienne, but her parents Frank and Jean only gave the demons Adrienne. The cult orchestrated the deaths of Fawn's parents, knowing that they would try to stop them from "apologizing" to the demons for the Harrimans' earlier transgression by giving them Fawn. Saunders, wracked with guilt over all of the deaths that he has overseen and orchestrated, commits suicide after killing his own bodyguard and giving Stewart a special key that will grant Stewart access to the Roxy.

Stewart saves Matt, but Wendy disappears while Fawn is captured by decomposing demons who have killed and replaced a surveyor, Jevan, Indy, and Kyle. Stewart and Fawn escape from the demons, but just as they reach an exit, Fawn, her voice now demonic, drags Stewart back into the Roxy while yelling, "I'm Adrienne!"

== Cast ==
- Monèle LeStrat as Fawn Harriman
- Linden Baker as Kyle Blaker
- Kennie Benoit as Matteus "Matt" Darnell
- Hollie Anne Kornik as Wendy Shardlow
- Eva Kwok as Indira "Indy" Divani
- Logan Russell as Jevan Blaker
- Gary Martin as Mayor Elliot Saunders
- Ania Marson as Professor Celia Nightingale
- John R. Walker as Victor Stewart
- Spencer Banks as Reverend Simon Randall
- Cheryl Burfield as Liz Randall
- Ian Donnelly as Wayne Fletcher
- Lesley Scoble as Karen
- Tiana Diehl as Dorothy Felix
- Emily Diehl-Reader as Tanya Hernández
- Donald Philips as Ed Clayton
- Mike Reader as Frank Harriman
- Mellissa Borkent as Jean Harriman

== Release ==
The Amityville Playhouse was released on DVD in the United Kingdom by 4Digital Media on April 13, 2015. 4Digital Media also released the film, under the name The Amityville Theater, on DVD in North America on June 23, 2015.

== Reception ==
The Amityville Playhouse was deemed "a slog" that was full of "terrible actors" by Tex Hula of Ain't It Cool News. Patrick Cooper of Bloody Disgusting lambasted The Amityville Playhouse, writing, "The film is absolutely miserable from the script to the acting. The lighting is either washed out or too dark and overall just avoid this mess." James Luxford of Radio Times was similarly critical of the film, calling it an unoriginal "shabby shock-fest" with "stiff and awkward performances" before concluding, "Unlikely to excite even the most ardent horror fans, The Amityville Playhouse is an under-developed misfire that, if nothing else, makes you pine for scary movies of old." The film was allotted a score of 1/5 by The Guardian's Leslie Felperin, who succinctly stated that it suffered from "bad special effects, deliciously lousy scriptwriting, cack-handed direction and, above all, truly atrocious acting, attaining a level of ineptitude and woodenness that would shame the cheapest amateur porn film."
