= Pierre Castex =

French screenwriter

Pierre Castex (1924–1991) was a French screenwriter.
