= David Ian Rabey =

British academic

David Ian Rabey FLSW is an Emeritus Professor of Theatre and Theatre Practice at Aberystwyth University. He worked there for 35 years, until he retired from teaching at the end of August 2020.

He is the Artistic Director of Lurking Truth (Gwir sy'n Llechu) Theatre Company for which he has written several plays including:

Last Ditch (Anhrefn yng Nghymru) (first performed 2023), Land of My Fathers (first performed 2018), Lovefuries (first performed 2004), The Battle of the Crows (first performed 1998), Bite or Suck (first performed 1997) and The Back of Beyond (first performed 1996).

Professor Rabey has directed and/or performed in fifteen productions of the plays of Howard Barker and has also written several publications on his work. He has also published expository studies of the work of David Rudkin, Jez Butterworth and Alistair McDowall, as well as the wider studies Theatre, Time and Temporality and English Drama Since 1940.

Whilst at Aberystwyth University he directed many departmental productions with students, and taught Contemporary British and Irish Drama, Theatre in Contemporary Society, Shakespeare in Contemporary Performance, Playwriting, Acting and Directing.

In 2020, he was elected a Fellow of the Learned Society of Wales.

== Selected bibliography ==
Criticism

- Howard Barker: Politics and Desire (Palgrave Macmillan) 1989, 2009.
- English Drama Since 1940 (Longman Literature in English) 2003.
- David Rudkin: Sacred Disobedience - An Expository Study of His Drama, 1959-94 (Harwood/Routledge) 1997.
- Theatre of Catastrophe: New Essays on Howard Barker (co-editor with Karoline Gritzner) (Oberon) 2006.
- Howard Barker: Ecstasy and Death (Palgrave) 2009.
- Howard Barker's Art of Theatre (co-editor with Sarah Goldingay) (Manchester UP) 2013.
- The Theatre and Films of Jez Butterworth (Methuen Bloomsbury) 2015.
- Theatre, Time and Temporality (Intellect Books) 2016.
- Alistair McDowall's 'Pomona' (Routledge) 2018.

Plays

- The Wye Plays: The Back of Beyond and The Battle of the Crows (Intellect Books) 2004.
- Lovefuries: The Contracting Sea and The Hanging Judge, with Bite or Suck (Intellect Books) 2008.
- Last Ditch (Anhrefn yng Nghymru) and Land of My Fathers (Cambria Books) 2025.

Podcast

- Jerusalem by Jez Butterworth: The Play Podcast July 18, 2022 https://www.theplaypodcast.com/050-jerusalem-by-jez-butterworth/
