= David Rudkin =

English playwright (born 1936)

- Born: James David Rudkin; 29 June 1936 (age 90); London, England
- Occupation: Playwright
- Writing career
- Language: English

James David Rudkin (born 29 June 1936) is an English playwright.

== Early life ==
Rudkin was born in London of Irish parents and spent his early youth in County Armagh. He came from a family of strict evangelical Christians, and was educated at King Edward's School, Birmingham and read Mods and Greats at St Catherine's College, Oxford. Beginning to write during national service in the Royal Corps of Signals, Rudkin taught Latin, Greek and music at North Bromsgrove High School in Worcestershire until 1964, while also directing amateur theatre productions.

== Career ==
Following the success of his first play Afore Night Come (1962), Rudkin translated works by Aeschylus, Roger Vitrac, the libretto of Schoenberg's Moses and Aaron, and wrote the book to the Western Theatre Ballet's Sun into Darkness (Sadlers Wells 1963) and the libretto for Gordon Crosse's comic opera, The Grace of Todd.

Rudkin's major works for the stage include Ashes (1974), The Sons of Light (written in 1965 though not staged until 1975), The Triumph of Death (1981) and The Saxon Shore (1986). His associations with the RSC also led him to translate the Hippolytus of Euripides for the company in 1978, having translated the author's Hecuba for radio three years previously.

He has written for television, including The Stone Dance (1963), Children Playing (1967), House of Character (1968) (staged by the Birmingham Rep as No Title in 1974), Blodwen, Home from Rachel's Marriage (1969), Bypass (1972), Atrocity (1973), the Alan Clarke-directed Penda's Fen (1974), and Artemis 81 (1981); for radio, including No Accounting for Taste (1960), Gear Change (1967), Cries from Casement as His Bones are Brought to Dublin (1973) (also staged by the RSC); and for cinema, including François Truffaut's Fahrenheit 451 (1966).

He has also written a volume in the British Film Institute's "Film Classics" series, a 2005 study of Carl Theodor Dreyer's Vampyr.

== Works ==
=== Stage plays ===
- Afore Night Come, Royal Shakespeare Company at the Arts Theatre, directed by Clifford Williams (1962)
- Burglars, a short children's play originally written for radio, Oval House Theatre (1968)
- The Filth Hunt, one-act play, InterAction at the Almost Free Theatre (1972)
- Ashes, Stadsteater Hamburg (1973), Open Space Theatre (1974), staged off-Broadway in 1977 and winner of an Obie award
- The Sons of Light, Tyneside Theatre Company (1976); revised for the RSC at The Other Place (1977)
- Sovereignty Under Elizabeth, one-act play, InterAction at the Almost Free Theatre (1977)
- Hansel and Gretel, RSC, The Other Place (1980)
- The Triumph of Death, Birmingham Rep (1981)
- Space Invaders, one-act play, RSC Youth Festival, Stratford (1983)
- Will's Way, monologue spoken by Shakespeare, RSC Youth Festival, Stratford (1984)
- The Saxon Shore, Almeida Theatre (1986)
- John Piper in the House of Death, after Daniel Defoe's A Journal of the Plague Year, Central School of Speech and Drama (1991)
- Symphonie Pathétique (commissioned for the centenary of the death of Tchaikovsky) (1992), unperformed
- Trade (1997), unperformed
- Red Sun, AJTC touring production (2003)
- The Master and Margarita dramatised from Mikhail Bulgakov for the National Youth Theatre of Great Britain (2004)
- Merlin Unchained, Aberystwyth University, directed by David Ian Rabey (2009)

=== Television plays ===
- The Stone Dance, ATV, starring Michael Bryant, John Hurt, Michael Hordern and Rachel Thomas, directed by Peter Wood (1963)
- Children Playing, ATV, directed by Peter Wood (1967)
- House of Character, BBC Wednesday Play (1967)
- Blodwen, Home from Rachel's Marriage, BBC Wednesday Play (1969)
- Bypass, BBC, starring Bob Peck (1972)
- Atrocity, BBC (1973)
- Penda's Fen, BBC Play for Today directed by Alan Clarke (1974)
- Churchill's People, BBC (1975), two episodes;
  - Pritân
  - The Coming of the Cross
- A Ghost Story for Christmas, BBC, one episode;
  - The Ash Tree, adaptation of the M. R. James story, (1975)
- Leap in the Dark, BBC, one episode;
  - The Living Grave (1980)
- Artemis 81, BBC, starring Hywel Bennett, Roland Curram, Dan O'Herlihy, Ian Redford, Dinah Stabb, and Sting (1981)
- Across the Water, BBC, starring Liam Neeson (1983)
- White Lady, BBC, directed by the author (1986)
- Sir Gawain and the Green Knight, adaptation for Thames TV (1991)

=== Radio plays ===
- Cries from Casement as His Bones are Brought to Dublin (1973)
- The Lovesong of Alfred J. Hitchcock (1993) Won a Society of Authors award and a Sony Radio Award for Richard Griffiths
- The Haunting of Mahler (1994)
- The Giant's Cause (2004) About Finn MacCoul
- Macedonia (2015) About Euripides

=== Film ===
- Mademoiselle, script doctoring (1966)
- Fahrenheit 451, translation and additional scriptwriting (1966)
- Testimony, based on the memoirs of Shostakovich as dictated in the book Testimony (1987)
- December Bride, based on the 1951 novel by Sam Hanna Bell (1990)
- The Woodlanders, adapted from Thomas Hardy's novel (1997) Won Best Film at the Shanghai International Film Festival

=== Translations ===
- The Persians by Aeschylus, BBC Radio 3, with Donald Wolfit as Ghost of Darius (1965)
- Hecuba by Euripides, BBC Radio 3, directed by John Tydeman (1975)
- Hippolytus by Euripides, Royal Shakespeare Company, directed by Ron Daniels with Natasha Parry as Phaedra, Michael Pennington as Hippolytus, and Patrick Stewart as Theseus (1978); directed for Radio 3 by John Tydeman (1984) with Siân Phillips as Phaedra
- Peer Gynt by Henrik Ibsen, RSC (1983)
- Deathwatch by Jean Genet, RSC at The Pit (1987)
- The Maids by Jean Genet, RSC at The Pit, (1987); revived at the Donmar Warehouse in 1997, directed by John Crowley, with Josette Simon, Niamh Cusack, and Kerry Fox
- Rosmersholm by Henrik Ibsen, Radio 3, directed by John Tydeman with Lindsay Duncan as Rebecca West and Charles Kay as Professor Kroll (1990)
- When We Dead Waken by Henrik Ibsen, Almeida Theatre, directed by Jonathan Kent with Claire Bloom as Irena (1990)

=== Opera libretti ===
- Moses and Aaron, translation of Arnold Schoenberg's libretto, Royal Opera House, directed by Peter Hall, conducted by Georg Solti (1964)
- The Grace of Todd, one-act comic opera by Gordon Crosse, Aldeburgh Festival (1969)
- Broken Strings, one-act opera by Param Vir, originally produced by Pierre Audi at De Nederlandse Opera (1992)
- Inquest of Love, script doctoring work for Jonathan Harvey's opera, English National Opera (1993)
- Black Feather Rising, music theatre piece by Param Vir, Toneelschuur and tour of the Netherlands (2008)

=== Books ===
- The Keeper, a short story, Nightjar Press, 2021
- Shore Zone, short stories in the 'weird fiction' genre, Strange Attractor Press, 2025
