= Works based on the Amityville haunting =

Film series

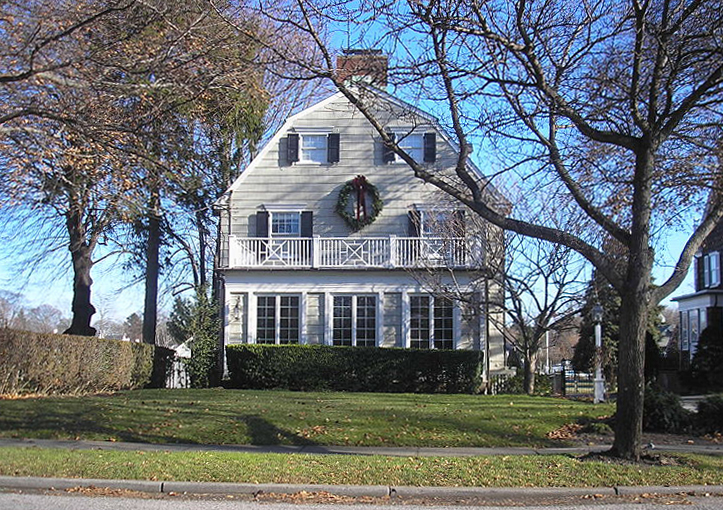
112 Ocean Avenue, the purportedly haunted house in Amityville

The Amityville haunting is a modern folk story based on the true crimes of Ronald DeFeo Jr. On November 13, 1974, DeFeo shot and killed six members of his family at 112 Ocean Avenue, Amityville, on the south shore of Long Island. He was convicted of second-degree murder in November 1975. In December 1975, George and Kathy Lutz and their three children moved into the house. After 28 days, the Lutzes left the house, claiming to have been terrorized by paranormal phenomena while living there. The house became the subject of numerous investigations by journalists, skeptics, and paranormal researchers, including Ed and Lorraine Warren. These events served as the historical basis for Jay Anson's 1977 novel The Amityville Horror, which was followed by a number of sequels and was adapted into a film of the same name in 1979. Since then, many films have been produced that draw explicitly, to a greater or lesser extent, from these historical and literary sources. As Amityville is a real town and the stories of DeFeo and the Lutzes are historical, there can be no proprietary relationship to the underlying elements associated with the Amityville haunting. As a result of this, there has been no restriction on the exploitation of the story by film producers, which is the reason that most of these films share no continuity, were produced by different companies, and tell widely varying stories.

The Amityville Horror film, released in the summer of 1979, was a major box office success, and went on to become one of the most commercially successful independent films of all time. A series of sequels were released throughout the 1980s and into the 1990s through various distributors; some of the films received theatrical distribution, while others were direct-to-video releases. In 2005, a re-imagining of the first film was released.

Beginning in 2011, there was a resurgence of low-budget direct-to-video independent films based on or loosely inspired by the Amityville events.

In 2017, The Weinstein Company and Dimension Films distributed the first theatrical Amityville film since the 2005 re-imagining. Amityville: The Awakening, which was filmed in 2014, was released theatrically in Ukraine on July 27, 2017, and in the United States on October 28, 2017.

== Literature ==
- The Amityville Horror, a 1977 book by American author Jay Anson
- Murder in Amityville, a 1979 book by Hans Holzer that serves as a prequel to The Amityville Horror
- High Hopes: The Amityville Murders, a 1981 book by Gerard Sullivan and Harvey Aronson
- The Amityville Curse, a 1981 book by Hans Holzer
- The Amityville Horror Part II, a 1982 book by John G. Jones that serves as a sequel to The Amityville Horror
- Amityville: The Final Chapter, a 1985 book by John G. Jones
- Amityville: The Evil Escapes, a 1988 book by John G. Jones
- Amityville: The Horror Returns, a 1989 book by John G. Jones
- The Amityville Horror: The Nightmare Continues, a 1991 book by Jay Anson
- Amityville: My Sister's Keeper, a 2016 book by Micky Sexton

== Films ==
Film	U.S. release date	Director(s)	Screenwriter(s)	Producer(s)	Notes
Original series
The Amityville Horror	July 27, 1979	Stuart Rosenberg	Sandor Stern	Elliot Geisinger & Ronald Saland	based on the book of the same title
Amityville II: The Possession	September 24, 1982	Damiano Damiani	Tommy Lee Wallace; Dardano Sacchetti (uncredited)	Ira N. Smith, Stephen R. Greenwald, José López Rodero & Dino De Laurentis (uncredited)	based on the book Murder in Amityville; Mexican-American co-production
Amityville 3-D	November 18, 1983	Richard Fleischer	William Wales	Stephen F. Kesten, Antonio Rubio & Dino De Laurentis (uncredited)	aka Amityville III: The Demon; Mexican-American co-production
Amityville 4: The Evil Escapes	May 12, 1989	Sandor Stern	Sandor Stern	Steve White, Barry Bernardi & Kenneth Atchity	aka Amityville Horror: The Evil Escapes & Amityville: The Evil Escapes; based on the book Amityville: The Evil Escapes
The Amityville Curse	May 7, 1990	Tom Berry	Michael Krueger, Doug Olson & Norvell Rose	Franco Battista	based on the book of the same title; Canadian production
Amityville: It's About Time	July 16, 1992	Tony Randel	Christopher DeFaria & Antonio Toro	Steve White, Barry Bernardi & Christopher DeFaria	aka Amityville 1992: It's About Time; based on the book Amityville: The Evil Escapes
Amityville: A New Generation	September 29, 1993	John Murlowski	Christopher DeFaria & Antonio Toro	Steve White, Barry Bernardi & Christopher DeFaria	
Amityville Dollhouse	February 18, 1997	Steve White	Joshua Michael Stern	Steve White, David Newlon, Zane W. Levitt & Mark Yellen	
Studio Remakes/Reboots
The Amityville Horror	April 15, 2005	Andrew Douglas	Scott Kosar	Michael Bay, Andrew Form & Brad Fuller	Remake of The Amityville Horror (1979)
Amityville: The Awakening	October 28, 2017	Franck Khalfoun	Franck Khalfoun	Daniel Farrands, Jason Blum & Casey La Scala	Takes place in the "real world" where the original film & all its sequels are a work of fiction
Untitled Amityville film	TBA	Joseph Winter & Vanessa Winter	Joseph Winter & Vanessa Winter	Raphael Margules, J.D. Lifshitz, Adam Hendricks & Greg Gilreath	Has nothing to do with any previous Amityville IP. It will focus on the real-life paranormal story behind those films & offer a new look at the notorious Amityville house on 112 Ocean Avenue
Untitled Amityville Horror reimagining	TBA	David F. Sandberg	Ian B. Goldberg & Richard Naing	Peter Safran & John Rickard	Described as a reimagining of the 1979 horror classic
Independent releases
The Amityville Haunting	December 13, 2011	Geoff Meed	Geoff Meed	David Michael Latt	
The Amityville Asylum	June 3, 2013	Andrew Jones	Andrew Jones	Andrew Jones	
Amityville Death House	February 24, 2015	Mark Polonia	John Oak Dalton	Mark Polonia	
Amityville: The Final Chapter	March 28, 2015	Forris Day Jr & Geno McGahee	Geno McGahee	Geno McGahee	aka Sickle
The Amityville Playhouse	April 13, 2015	John R. Walker	John R. Walker & Steve Hardy	John R. Walker	aka The Amityville Theater
Amityville: Vanishing Point	April 1, 2016	Dylan Greenberg	Dylan Greenberg, Selena Mars & Jurgen Azazel Munster	Jurgen Azazel Munster	
The Amityville Legacy	June 7, 2016	Dustin Ferguson & Michael Johnson	Dustin Ferguson & Michael Johnson	Dustin Ferguson, Matthew DiGirolamo & Jake Bockoven	re-released in 2020 as Amityville Toybox
The Amityville Terror	August 2, 2016	Michael Angelo	Michael Angelo	Justin Jones, Philip J Day & Zeus Zamani	
Amityville: No Escape	August 5, 2016	Henrique Couto	Henrique Couto	Eric Widing	
The Unspoken	October 28, 2016	Sheldon Wilson	Sheldon Wilson	Jamie Goehring	
Amityville Exorcism	January 3, 2017	Mark Polonia	Billy D'Amato	Mark Polonia	
Amityville: Evil Never Dies	June 2017	Dustin Ferguson	Dustin Ferguson	Matthew DiGirolamo, Jason Harlow & Jason Bracht	sequel to The Amityville Legacy; re-released in 2020 as Amityville Clownhouse
Against the Night	September 15, 2017	Brian Cavallaro	Brian Cavallaro	Arielle Brachfeld & Brian Cavallaro	aka Amityville Prison
Amityville: Mt. Misery Road	May 31, 2018	Chuck Morrongiello & Karolina Morrongiello	Chuck Morrongiello	Chuck Morrongiello & Karolina Morrongiello	
The Amityville Murders	February 8, 2019	Daniel Farrands	Daniel Farrands	Daniel Farrands, Eric Brenner, Jim Jacobsen & Lucas Jarach	aka The Amityville Murders: A Haunting on Long Island. Loosely based on the books Murder in Amityville & High Hopes: The Amityville Murders
Amityville Island	March 17, 2020	Mark Polonia	John Oak Dalton	Rob Hauschild	
Amityville Vibrator	June 6, 2020	Nathan Rumler	Nathan Rumler	Nathan Rumler	
Witches of Amityville Academy	October 2, 2020	Rebecca Matthews	Tom Jolliffe	Nicole Holland, Kira Reed, Donna Spangler & Brittan Taylor	aka Amityville Witches
The Amityville Harvest	October 20, 2020	Thomas J. Churchill	Thomas J. Churchill	Thomas J. Churchill, Steven Louis Goldenberg & Phillip B. Goldfine	
An Amityville Poltergeist	May 18, 2021	Calvin Morie McCarthy	John Ashley Hall & Calvin Morie McCarthy	Josh Dietrich, Airisa Durand & Calvin Morie McCarthy	
The Amityville Moon	October 5, 2021	Thomas J. Churchill	Thomas J. Churchill	Thomas J. Churchill, Steven Louis Goldenberg & Phillip B. Goldfine	sequel to The Amityville Harvest
Amityville Cop	October 29, 2021	Gregory Hatanaka	Geno McGahee	Geno McGahee, Gregory Hatanaka, Nicole D'Angelo, Craijece Danielle, Chris Spinelli, Benny Tjandra & Jason Toler	
Amityville Cult	December 7, 2021	Trey Murphy	Trey Murphy	Chance Gibbs, Trey Murphy & Micha Marie Stevens	
Amityville Vampire	December 14, 2021	Tim Vigil	Carlos Perez & Tim Vigil	Ted Chalmers, David S. Sterling & Gustave Whinnery	
Amityville Scarecrow	January 4, 2022	Peter Jack Mundy	Shannon Holiday	Scott Jeffrey	
Amityville Uprising	January 11, 2022	Thomas J. Churchill	Thomas J. Churchill	Thomas J. Churchill & Phillip B. Goldfine	sequel to The Amityville Moon
Amityville Gas Chamber	April 1, 2022	Michael Stone	Michael Stone	Michael Stone	Parody film released on streaming and DVD
Amityville in Space	July 19, 2022	Mark Polonia	Mark Polonia	Rob Hauschild	
Amityville Hex	August 9, 2022	Tony Newton	Tony Newton & Shawn C. Phillips	Michael Bilinski, David Cartledge & Sam Mason-Bell	
Amityville in the Hood	August 23, 2022	Dustin Ferguson	Jerimiah Douglas & Dustin Ferguson	Dustin Ferguson (as Dark Infinity), Rob Hauschild & Saul Mejia	
Amityville Karen	September 13, 2022	Shawn C. Phillips	Julie Anne Prescott	Shawn C. Phillips, Will Collazo Jr, Avery Crumley & Ron Bonk	
Amityville Christmas Vacation	September 19, 2022	Steve Rudzinski	Steve Rudzinski	Steve Rudzinski	winner of the 2023 Fangoria Chainsaw Award for "Best Amityville"
The Amityville Exorcist	October 31, 2022	Tony Newton	Tony Newton	Tony Newton	
Amityville Thanksgiving	November 8, 2022	Will Collazo Jr & Julie Anne Prescott	Will Collazo Jr & Julie Anne Prescott	Shawn C. Phillips, Will Collazo Jr, Avery Crumley & Julie Anne Prescott	
Amityville Scarecrow II	November 14, 2022	Adam Gowrie	Craig McLearie	Stuart Alson, Scott Chambers, Becca Hirani & Nicole Holland	sequel to Amityville Scarecrow
Ghosts of Amityville	November 22, 2022	Jt Kris	Jt Kris	Danny Langston	
The Amityville Cute Farting Cat	December 14, 2022	Dane Bowling	Dane Bowling	Dane Bowling	
Amityville Ride-Share	January 9, 2023	Jack Hunter II	Dann Eudy & Jack Hunter II	Dann Eudy, Dustin Hubbard, Jack Hunter II & Heather McKnight	
Amityville Death Toilet	March 17, 2023	Evan Jacobs	Evan Jacobs	Ron Bonk	
Amityville Frankenstein	April 13, 2023	Nick Box	Nick Box	Nick Box, Matt Mcnew & Chan Walrus	
Amityville Job Interview	April 14, 2023	Nick Box & Stuart Fitzsimmons	Nick Box & Stuart Fitzsimmons	Nick Box, Matt Mcnew, Chan Walrus & Stuart Fitzsimmons	
Amityville Elevator	April 20, 2023	Nick Box	Nick Box	Nick Box & Matt Mcnew	
Amityville Emanuelle	May 8, 2023	Louis DeStefano	Geno McGahee	Geno McGahee, Gregory Hatanaka & Linda S. Wong	
The Amityville Curse	May 28, 2023	Éric Tessier	Dennis Heaton	Graham Ludlow & Kaleigh Kavanagh	based on the 1981 novel of the same name, though not a remake of the 1990 adaptation
Amityville Shark House	August 8, 2023	Will Collazo Jr & Shawn C. Phillips	Shawn C. Phillips, Will Collazo Jr & Julie Anne Prescott	Shawn C. Phillips, Will Collazo Jr & Julie Anne Prescott	
Amityville Apocalypse	August 29, 2023	Will Collazo Jr, Brandon Farmer, Evan Jacobs, Mark C. Fullhardt, William Holt, Marc Chindemi, Steven Haar, Alan Smithee & Toby Van Der Wegen	Marc Chindemi, Steven Haar, Alan Smithee & Toby Van Der Wegen	Steven Haar, Cole Miner, Jose Sanchez & Alan Smithee	Anthology film
Amityville Ripper	October 21, 2023	Bobby Canipe Jr	Bobby Canipe Jr	Ron Bonk, Abdulla Ahmed Alzaabi, Joseph Burton Brunk III, Natasha Chisdes, Carl Cunningham, Brady Daley, Dallas Hurlburt & Lester G. Reynolds	
The Last Amityville Movie	November 20, 2023	Josh Spiegel	Josh Spiegel		
Amityville Backpack	January 6, 2024	Evan Jacobs	Evan Jacobs	Ron Bonk	
Amityville Bigfoot	January 23, 2024	Shawn C. Phillips	Shawn C. Phillips & Julie Anne Prescott	Shawn C. Phillips, Ron Bonk & Mem Ferda	
Amityville Webcam	February 24, 2024	Brandon Farmer	Brandon Farmer	Brandon Farmer, David Strege, Kyle Rappaport & Jacob Varaney	
Amityville Turkey Day	April 29, 2024	Will Collazo Jr & Julie Anne Prescott	Will Collazo Jr & Julie Anne Prescott	Will Collazo Jr, Julie Anne Prescott, Dino Castello, Phil Herman, David Perry & Niko El Santo Zavero	
Amityville Backrooms	September 5, 2024	Evan Jacobs	Evan Jacobs	Ron Bonk & Jordan Reyes	
Once Upon a Time in Amityville	September 24, 2024	Mark Polonia	Mark Polonia & Aaron Drake	Rob Hauschild	
Amityville AI	October 21, 2024	Matt Jaissle	Matt Jaissle	Ron Bonk	
Amityville: Where the Echo Lives	October 29, 2024	Carlos Ayala	Carlos Ayala	Carlos Ayala & Al Bravo	
Amityville Void	December 5, 2024	Walker J. Hunt	Walker J. Hunt		
Amityville VR	February 1, 2025	Matt Jaissle	Matt Jaissle	Ron Bonk	
Amityville Apt.	May 6, 2025	Pat Kusnadi, Forrest Casper, Charles Chudabala, Robbie Dias, Christopher Bryan Gomez, Melissa Green, Cristobal Hernandez Jeffrey Sarceno & 'Knife' Sotelo	Pat Kusnadi, Robbie Dias, Christopher Bryan Gomez, Melissa Green, Cristobal Hernandez, Kristian Dean Melendez, Jeffrey Sarceno & Richard J. Aguirre	Pat Kusnadi, Assaad Ghamlouche & George Hernandez	Anthology film
Amityville Chupacabra	October 25, 2025	Will Collazo Jr	Julie Anne Prescott	Gregory Hatanaka & Jamie Grefe	
Amityvillenado	February 27, 2026	Paul Tucker, Jeff Van Gerwen	Jeff Van Gerwen, Paul Tucker	Jeff Van Gerwen, Clay Aleman, Rebekah Cianci, Paul Tucker	
Amityville Rex	May 12, 2026	Mark Polonia	Aaron Drake	Mark Polonia & Jeff Kirkendall	
Amityville: Bed & Breakfast	September 1, 2026	Walt Braley, Joe Blackstock, & Harry Pasley (as Varmint Hole)			

=== Overview ===
The first film to be inspired by the story of the Amityville haunting, The Amityville Horror (1979) chronicles the events of Jay Anson's novel, in which the Lutz family finds their new home in Amityville, New York, to be haunted; the house had been the site of a mass murder by Ronald DeFeo Jr. in 1974. The following film, Amityville II: The Possession, is a prequel based on the book Murder in Amityville by Hans Holzer, and depicts the purported supernatural events in the home that led DeFeo to murder his family. The third installment, Amityville 3-D, is set after the events of the first film, and was released in 3D.

In 1989, the fourth installment, Amityville 4: The Evil Escapes, was released as a made-for-television film, and documents hauntings stemming from a floor lamp that was in the home at the time of the DeFeo murders. The Amityville Curse, released in 1990, follows a group of teenagers who spend the night in a former rectory in Amityville where a priest committed suicide; this installment was set in an entirely different house. Amityville: It's About Time, released in 1992, focuses on a haunted clock that a family from Los Angeles, California takes into their home from an estate sale in New York. The seventh film in the series, Amityville: A New Generation, also utilizes a haunted object as a plot device. This time, a man purchases a mirror possessed by the spirit of his father, who, like DeFeo, also murdered his family in the Amityville house with a shotgun. Amityville Dollhouse (1996) follows a family haunted by spirits unleashed from a doll house replica of the Amityville home.

In 2005, a remake of the 1979 original film was released theatrically. In 2017’s Amityville: The Awakening, which received a limited theatrical release, a family with an ill son moves into the home and find themselves tormented by ghosts who seek to possess the son's body.

Further films would follow, each released direct-to-video or with limited theatrical releases: The Amityville Haunting (2011; a found footage film that presents supposed home movies that corroborate the family's haunting); The Amityville Asylum (2013, set in a haunted Amityville psychiatric hospital); Amityville Death House (2015, featured yet another explanation for the hauntings); Amityville Playhouse (2016, focuses on a haunted theater in Amityville); Amityville: Vanishing Point (2016, focused on a haunted boarding house in Amityville); The Amityville Legacy (2016, features a haunted toy monkey from the original house), The Amityville Terror (2016, a family moves to Amityville and are tormented both by an evil spirit and the townsfolk who want to keep them trapped there); Amityville: No Escape (2016, college students encounter evil in the forest around Amityville); and Amityville Exorcism (2017, evil spirits possess the daughter of a family that moves to Amityville).

==== Continuity between films ====
Only the first two films released share some continuity, although they also contain contradictions. Amityville II is a prequel to the original 1979 movie, and tells the story of the murder of the DeFeo family (renamed the Montelli family in the film). Amityville 3-D is not a sequel as stated in the movie poster to the first 2 movies, and is based on the accounts of paranormal investigator Stephen Kaplan (renamed John Baxter for the film), who was trying to prove that the Lutz family's story was a hoax. Due to legal disputes with the actual Lutz family, the events of the first movie could not be directly referenced, nor could the Lutz family themselves be referenced by name.

Of the later films, Amityville: The Awakening (2017) is explicitly a different continuity from all of the previous movies, which are depicted as films within the film; the characters watch and discuss the 1979 movie, and one of them brings DVDs of the sequels and remake to the protagonist's house. The Amityville Curse (2023) is loosely based on the 1981 book of the same name, but is not a remake of its 1990 adaptation.

=== Release ===
==== Producers and distributors ====
The films have at various times been owned by several different production and distribution companies internationally and in the United States. American International Pictures produced and released the original film, before Orion Pictures bought the rights to the film, as well as II and 3-D. Metro-Goldwyn-Mayer (MGM) now owns films one through 3-D, and released them in a DVD box set in 2005. While 4 was a TV film broadcast on NBC, it has been released multiple times by independent distribution companies in recent years (one of which was Vidmark, who also released Curse (1990); Vidmark is now owned by Lionsgate). Multicom Entertainment Group owns distribution rights to Amityville 4: The Evil Escapes, It's About Time, A New Generation and Dollhouse.

=== Box office ===
Film	Release date	Budget	Total Gross	Ref.
The Amityville Horror	July 27, 1979	$4,700,000	$86,432,000	
Amityville II: The Possession	September 24, 1982	$5,000,000	$12,534,817	
Amityville 3-D	November 18, 1983	$6,000,000	$6,333,135	
The Amityville Horror	April 15, 2005	$19,000,000	$108,047,131	
Amityville: The Awakening	October 28, 2017	—N/a	$8,481,997	
The Amityville Murders	February 8, 2019	—N/a	$77,206	

=== Critical reception ===
Film	Rating	
Film	Rotten Tomatoes	Metacritic
The Amityville Horror (1979)	33% (48 reviews)	32
Amityville II: The Possession	27% (22 reviews)	—N/a
Amityville 3-D	18% (22 reviews)	—N/a
Amityville 4: The Evil Escapes	40% (5 reviews)	—N/a
The Amityville Curse (1990)	17% (7 reviews)	—N/a
Amityville: It's About Time	45% (11 reviews)	—N/a
Amityville: A New Generation	—N/a	—N/a
Amityville Dollhouse	—N/a	—N/a
The Amityville Horror (2005)	23% (163 reviews)	33
Amityville: The Awakening	29% (21 reviews)	42
The Amityville Murders	0% (16 reviews)	35
The Amityville Curse (2023)	—N/a	—N/a

== Documentary ==
- My Amityville Horror, a 2012 documentary focusing on Daniel Lutz's account of the haunting. At the time of the events, he was a child.

== Podcast ==
- Amityville was the subject of a podcast produced by Radiotopia in early 2026.

== See also ==
- Bloodbath at the House of Death, a 1984 spoof on the 1979 film The Amityville Horror

== Works cited ==
- Arkoff, Samuel Z.; Turbo, Richard (1992). Flying Through Hollywood By the Seat of My Pants. Birch Lane Press. ISBN 978-1-559-72107-3.
- Smith, Gary A. (2009). The American International Pictures Video Guide. McFarland. ISBN 978-0-786-43309-4.
