= The Amityville Haunting =

- DVD cover
- Directed by: Geoff Meed
- Written by: Geoff Meed
- Story by: Geoff Meed
- Produced by: David Michael Latt
- Cinematography: Ben Demaree
- Edited by: Cody Peck
- Music by: David Raiklen
- Production companies: The Asylum; Taut Productions
- Distributed by: The Asylum
- Release date: December 13, 2011
- Running time: 86 minutes
- Country: United States
- Language: English

The Amityville Haunting is a 2011 direct-to-video horror film released on December 13, 2011. The film is inspired by Jay Anson's 1977 book The Amityville Horror. It was produced by The Asylum and Taut Productions.

The film is written and directed by Geoff Meed and features Tyler Shamy, Devin Clark, and Jon Kondelik. The tagline is "The family did not survive. But the recordings did." It claims to be based on "actual found footage that documents the horrifying experiences of a family that moved into the infamous haunted house." The film was panned by critics, and has been often cited as one of the worst horror films ever made.

== Plot ==
In June 2008, the Benson family moves into 112 Ocean Avenue, Amityville, due to issues with their teenage daughter, Lori. Despite the disturbing history of the house where Ronald DeFeo Jr. shot and killed six family members in 1974, the Bensons agree to purchase the house. Upon their decision, they find their realtor Camilla Weldon dead in their driveway. The following day, Tyler Benson witnesses Steve, one of the movers falling down the stairs, killing him instantly. The family continues to live in the house, despite the tension growing from the unexplainable events occurring.

From doors opening to a mysterious phone appearing in the kitchen, paranormal phenomena continue to bother Tyler, while his parents refuse to believe anything is happening beyond their own explanation. Douglas Benson takes matters into his own hands when he decides to install CCTV cameras in the house. Young Melanie Benson attracts the family's attention when she starts talking to her "imaginary friend," John Matthew, which leads Douglas to wonder if Lori or Tyler told Melanie about the house's history.

As the family grows more fearful of the unexplainable deaths of Cut, a close family friend and Greg, a neighbor boy attracted to Lori, Douglas breaks down, using religious paraphernalia to rid the house of any spirits that reside within the house. After one month within the house, Lori, Virginia, Douglas, and Tyler Benson all die in various manners. Melanie Benson is the only survivor, as she says that she has plans to stay in the house forever, along with John Matthew. The autopsy reports shown at the end of the film emphasize the fact that each victim was under extreme stress at the time of their death.

== Cast ==
- Jason Williams as Douglas Benson
- Amy Van Horne as Virginia Benson
- Devin Clark as Tyler Benson
- Nadine Crocker as Lori Benson
- Gracie Largent as Melanie Benson
- Luke Barnett as Ronald DeFeo Jr. / The Ghost
- Tyler Shamy as Greg
- John Kondelik as Brett
- Alexander Rzechowicz as Donny Reddit
- Casey Campbell as Detective

== Reception ==
The Amityville Haunting was panned by critics, and has been cited as one of the worst films made by The Asylum. A Horrornews.net writer called it "simply just a bad movie with no offering for viewers whatsoever", criticizing the over-used low-budget scare tricks and its false advertising as "actual found footage". He also described Jason Williams' performance as Doug Benson as "not believable for what it's trying to achieve and simply comes off as d*ck with an attitude", but said that "The military freak-out tops the icing by just making it all seem rather silly". Dread Central's Foywonder scored it a one out of five, concluding his review with "A part of me almost wonders if the only reason The Amityville Haunting even exists is because someone made a bet that they could dethrone Amityville 3D for the title of worst Amityville movie of all time. I don’t know if they succeeded here, but they sure give it a run for its money."
