= The Amityville Legacy =

- Film poster
- Directed by: Dustin Ferguson; Mike Johnson
- Written by: Dustin Ferguson; Mike Johnson
- Produced by: Dustin Ferguson; Matthew DiGirolamo; Jake Bockoven
- Starring: Mark Popejoy; Julia Farrell; Jennii Caroline; Breana Mitchell; Colby Coash
- Cinematography: Mark Thimijan
- Edited by: Dustin Ferguson
- Music by: Aidan Casserly
- Production company: 42ND street films
- Distributed by: Sinister Studios; Wild Eye Releasing
- Release date: 7 June 2016 (United States)
- Running time: 66 minutes
- Country: United States
- Language: English

The Amityville Legacy (also known as Amityville Toybox) is a 2016 American horror film written and directed by Dustin Ferguson and Mike Johnson. It was released direct-to-video, and is the fifteenth film to be inspired by Jay Anson's 1977 novel The Amityville Horror. Mark Popejoy stars as Mark Janson, a father who begins murdering members of his own family after being gifted an evil cymbal-banging monkey toy that was taken from 112 Ocean Avenue, a haunted house in Amityville, New York.

== Plot ==
In 1974, Ronald DeFeo Jr. uses a rifle to kill his entire family at 112 Ocean Avenue in Amityville, New York. Four decades later, the Janson family comes together to celebrate the fiftieth birthday of the family's widowed patriarch, Mark. Mark is a recovering alcoholic who lives in rural Nebraska with his dementia-addled mother, Jeanne, and pregnant daughter, Britany. Attending the reunion are Mark's other three daughters Julia, Jennii, and Breana, Breana's boyfriend, Daniel, Mark's son, Anthony, Anthony's boyfriend, Jade, Mark's sister in-law, Cheyenne, and Cheyenne's daughter, Schuylar. One of Mark's birthday gifts is a cymbal-banging monkey toy that was at some point taken from 112 Ocean Avenue. The monkey is inhabited by a demon, which takes on the form of Mark's abusive deceased father, Mr. Janson. The demon torments Mark (who is a devout Catholic) with visions of things like Breana and Daniel having premarital sex and Anthony and Jade engaging in S&M, with each of the hallucinations being punctuated by the phrase, "Stop me, daddy." The demon tells Mark that he must eliminate any and all threats to his family's unity, so Mark reluctantly kills Cheyenne, Daniel, and Jade.

After the triple homicide, the demon declares that just killing the "outsiders" was not enough; it informs Mark that his family members are all awash in sin, and that it is up to Mark to "save" them by killing them in order to send their souls to Heaven. Mark experiences a sexually explicit vision of himself and Julia, and afterward arms himself with a shotgun, which he uses to murder Jeanne, Schuylar, and all of his children except for Julia. Julia wounds Mark during a struggle, and escapes while Mark is distracted dealing with a pair of passing motorists; after killing the motorists, Mark collects the bodies of all of his loved ones and stacks them in a room in his house, where he proceeds to commit suicide.

A week later, a psychic paranormal investigator visits the Janson house, and encounters the demon, which has possessed a paperboy. The demon brags about making Mark kill his family and himself, implies that it is the spawn of Satan, and murders the psychic by making her vomit up her own innards.

== Cast ==
- Mark Popejoy as Mark Janson
- Julia Farrell as Julia Janson
- Jennii Caroline as Jennii Janson
- Breana Mitchell as Breana Janson
- Daniel Joseph Stier as Daniel
- Tony Brown as Anthony Janson
- Jade Michael LaFont as Jade
- Britany Dailey as Britany Janson
- Schuylar Craig as Schuylar
- Cheyenne King as Cheyenne
- Jeanne Kern as Jeanne Janson
- Colby Coash as Mr. Janson
- Jason Bracht as Driver
- Jake Brokoven as Passenger
- Eric Moyer as Ronald DeFeo Jr.
- Emily Smith as Allison DeFeo
- Sarah Moshman as TV Saleswoman

== Reception ==
Tex Hula of Ain't It Cool News responded positively to The Amityville Legacy, writing, "This movie pulls off some impressive things on its micro-budget. It's basically a fan film, but a competently made one. It also comes to an abrupt end. Unlike the last movie, this one clocks in at sixty-six minutes and could've used at least another fifteen for a better ending." Dev Crowley ranked The Amityville Legacy as the eleventh best out of the fifteen Amityville films that she reviewed for FanSided, and called it "a whole lot sillier" than Amityville Dollhouse.

== Sequel ==
In 2017, Ferguson wrote and directed the sequel Amityville: Evil Never Dies, re-released in 2020 as Amityville Clownhouse.
