= Amityville: No Escape =

- Film poster
- Directed by: Henrique Couto
- Written by: Ira Gansler; Henrique Couto
- Produced by: Eric Widing
- Starring: Julia Gomez; Joni Durian; Allison Egan; Alia Gabrielle Eckhardt; Josh Miller; Duane West; Michael William Ralston; Ira Gansler
- Edited by: Eric Widing
- Production company: New Dynamic
- Distributed by: Camp Motion Pictures
- Release date: 5 August 2016 (United States)
- Running time: 78 minutes
- Country: United States
- Language: English

Amityville: No Escape is a 2016 American supernatural horror film written and directed by Henrique Couto, and co-written by Ira Gansler. It is the seventeenth film to be inspired by Jay Anson's 1977 novel The Amityville Horror. A found footage film, it follows two storylines, one set in 1997 and the other in 2016, that both involve 112 Ocean Avenue, a haunted house in Amityville, New York.

== Plot ==
In April 1997, a woman named Lina moves into 112 Ocean Avenue in Amityville, New York. The house is dilapidated and full of objects that were left in it by previous occupants, and as Lina works on repairing and cleaning it, she records a video diary for her absent husband, who is a soldier in the United States Army. Worsening paranormal phenomena occurs in the house, which Lina eventually learns was the site of an allegedly possession-induced familicide that was committed by Ronald DeFeo Jr. back in 1974. After a few weeks, an unseen presence attacks and kills Lina.

In August 2016, a college student named George Harris is doing a video thesis on fear, and convinces his girlfriend, Sarah Benning, his sister, Elizabeth, and their friends Lisa Sheets and Simon to accompany him on a camping trip to the woods near 112 Ocean Avenue. On their first night in the forest, George and Elizabeth encounter a woodsman who claims to be searching for his missing daughter, while a little girl dressed all in white is glimpsed by Simon. The next night, the quintet find the woodsman disemboweled shortly after the little girl is spotted by Elizabeth. The group try to flee the woods, but become lost despite spending several hours hiking while following their compass, with all of their attempts at calling for aid proving ineffective due to a lack of cellphone service and their radio emitting nothing but distorted screeching, which traumatizes Lisa.

Simon dies while searching for the little girl, and the increasingly distraught Lisa disappears after being lured off of the path by the child, who is invisible to George. Lisa and Elizabeth are killed, and George and Sarah become separated, with the latter stumbling onto and breaking into the vacant 112 Ocean Avenue at George's insistence. George soon enters the house, and calmly shoots himself in the head in front of Sarah (whose greatest fear was being left alone).

Sarah's fate is left unknown, as the film returns to the 1997 footage, which shows Lisa, looking exactly like she did in 2016 and speaking in a distorted child's voice, touch Lina's body and say, "Tag, you're it."

== Cast ==
- Julia Gomez as Lina
- Josh Miller as George Harris
- Allison Egan as Elizabeth Harris
- Alia Gabrielle Eckhardt as Lisa Sheets
- Joni Durian as Sarah Benning
- Michael William Ralston as Simon
- Ira Gansler as Woodsman
- Matt Brassfield as Video Store Clerk
- Stephen Arthur Alexander as Video Store Clerk
- Duane West as Tim
- Katrina Gansler as Little Girl

== Release ==
The film premiered at the By-Jo Theatre in Germantown, Ohio on August 5, 2016. It was released on DVD by Camp Motion Pictures on June 13, 2017.

== Reception ==
Famous Monsters of Filmland gave the film a glowingly positive review, writing, "If you are a fan of the franchise (in particular the first flick, natch) or just want to see something fresh in the found-footage fright-flick arena, I urge you to give Amityville: No Escape the attention of your putrid peepers. It is a brisk, traditional terror tale told in a fun and innovative way!" In contrast, Tex Hula ranked Amityville: No Escape as the third worst of the twenty-one Amityville films that he reviewed for Ain't It Cool News, and bluntly opined that its ending was "lame" and that the time that he spent watching it was "an hour and a half of life wasted." Fellow Ain't It Cool News reviewer M. L. Miller had a more lenient response to the film, writing, "There are some lulls in the present day stuff; some iffy motivations and decisions of the kids in the woods, some woods scenes that feel like the crew is just walking though a backyard that hasn’t been mowed for a week, and an open ending that really doesn't make a while lot of sense, but does register as creepy. The past stuff in Amityville: No Escape is actually pretty haunting in its simplicity and strong performance by Julia Gomez."
