= Amityville: Evil Never Dies =

- Film poster
- Directed by: Dustin Ferguson
- Written by: Dustin Ferguson
- Produced by: Jason Harlow; Jason Bracht; Matthew DiGirolamo
- Starring: Mark Patton; Helene Udy; Dawna Lee Heising; Ben Gothier; Michelle Muir-Lewis
- Cinematography: Guy White
- Edited by: Dustin Ferguson
- Music by: Rob Robinson
- Production company: 42ND street films
- Distributed by: Sinister Studios; Wild Eye Releasing
- Release date: June 2017 (United States)
- Running time: 74 minutes
- Country: United States
- Language: English

Amityville: Evil Never Dies (also known as Amityville Clownhouse) is a 2017 American horror film written and directed by Dustin Ferguson. It was released direct-to-video, and is the nineteenth film to be inspired by Jay Anson's 1977 novel The Amityville Horror. A sequel to the 2016 film The Amityville Legacy, it continues the story of an evil cymbal banging monkey toy that was taken from 112 Ocean Avenue, a haunted house in Amityville, New York. The film stars Mark Patton, Helene Udy, Dawna Lee Heising, Ben Gothier, and Michelle Muir-Lewis.

== Plot ==
After acquiring a clown painting that is implied to have originated from 112 Ocean Avenue in Amityville, New York, a Rhode Island senator named Ty Pangborn dons clown makeup and uses a shotgun to kill his dysfunctional family during his son James' birthday party, afterward committing suicide while forlornly stating, "This isn't funny." A week later, a trio of thieves led by Drake break into the Pangborn residence in search of the clown painting, and are murdered by a spectral clown, which rips out and eats Drake's heart. A priest is then shown being interviewed about 112 Ocean Avenue. The priest explains that even though the house was at some point destroyed, its evil still lives on in the form of objects (including a lamp, a clock, a mirror, a dollhouse, and a cymbal banging monkey toy) that were scavenged from it and sold to oblivious buyers all over the United States.

In Nebraska, Ben and his wife Michelle purchase the toy monkey from an antique shop called Jesse's Junk Drawer. The monkey causes Ben and Michelle to begin having nightmares about demons and 112 Ocean Avenue while it uses its supernatural powers to terrorize Michelle and corrupt Ben, who it influences into beating and raping a prostitute and Michelle. The monkey afterward alters Ben's memories so that he no longer remembers his crimes, also altering his perception of reality so that he can no longer even see the wounds that he has inflicted upon Michelle. Michelle throws the monkey away, but it returns to her, so she calls Jesse's Junk Drawer to inquire about it, and is told by the antique dealer Jesse that the monkey was acquired from the estate of Mark Janson, a man who slaughtered almost his entire family during a reunion in Lincoln. Michelle researches the Janson family massacre and visits its sole survivor, Mark's institutionalized daughter, Julia. Michelle learns about the familicide committed by Ronald DeFeo Jr. in 112 Ocean Avenue, about the "cursed objects" taken from the house that have instigated "copycat crimes" all over America, and about "a theatre full of people that's possessed."

When Michelle returns home, she is attacked by a shotgun-wielding Ben, who declares that she is to be sacrificed to Beelzebub. Michelle shoots the monkey with Ben's shotgun, and afterward flees the house with a recovered Ben. Jesse is then shown collecting the destroyed monkey, which he reassembles and puts back up for sale in Jesse's Junk Drawer.

== Cast ==
- Ben Gothier as Ben
- Michelle Muir-Lewis as Michelle
- Julia Farrell as Julia Janson
- Mark Patton as Jesse
- Helene Udy as Prostitute
- Dawna Lee Heising as Nosey Neighbor
- Darren Barcomb as Priest
- John R. Walker as Peter Sommers
- Tony Clarke as Father Hudson West
- Matthew Hickinbottom as Dustin Stafford
- Sheri Lee as Mrs. Pangborn
- Dan Mauro as Senator Ty Pangborn
- Daniel Martens as James Pangborn
- Casey Wright as Kelly Pangborn
- Sarah Reed as Sarah
- Evan Clinton as Drake
- Anthony Gaudette as Guy

== Reception ==
While Charlie Cargile of PopHorror criticized several aspects of the film, including its pacing and abrupt ending, he noted that despite its technical issues and lack of budget, it was still "a solid film" with enjoyable "micro-budget charm."
