= The Amityville Curse =

1990 film by Tom Berry

- Original theatrical release poster
- Directed by: Tom Berry
- Written by: Michael Krueger; Doug Olson; Norvell Rose
- Based on: The Amityville Curse by Hans Holzer
- Produced by: Franco Battista
- Starring: Kim Coates; Dawna Wightman; Helen Hughes; David Stein; Anthony Dean Rubeš; Cassandra Gava; Jan Rubeš
- Cinematography: Rodney Gibbons
- Edited by: Franco Battista
- Music by: Milan Kymlicka
- Production company: Allegro Films
- Distributed by: Vidmark Entertainment
- Release date: June 6, 1990
- Running time: 91 minutes
- Country: Canada
- Language: English
- Budget: $3.5 million

The Amityville Curse (released in the Philippines as Amityville Horror 1993) is a 1990 Canadian supernatural horror film directed by Tom Berry and starring Kim Coates, Cassandra Gava and Jan Rubeš. It is loosely based on the novel of the same name by Hans Holzer. It is the fifth film in the Amityville Horror film series.

== Plot ==
In Amityville, New York, the same town where Ronald DeFeo Jr. murdered his family in 1974, a Catholic priest is shot to death in a confession booth in his parish church. After the murder, the booth is removed and stored in the basement of the clergy house.

Twelve years later, psychologist Marvin and his wife Debbie purchase the clergy house. The couple invite their three friends: Frank, Bill, and Abigail, to help renovate the home. Debbie is immediately perturbed by the house and hears noises emanating from the basement, but Marvin dismisses her concerns. Debbie suffers nightmares revolving around the basement, particularly the confession booth. Marvin urges Debbie to note down her nightmares so he can psychoanalyze them. The next morning, the group are visited by Mrs. Moriarty, the eccentric former church secretary.

Marvin and Bill investigate the basement, and Bill comes across the confession booth, among other artifacts from the church. After an outbreak of apparent poltergeist activity occurs throughout the house, the group all become convinced the home is haunted, with the exception of Marvin. To calm their nerves, they plan to go out for dinner at a local bar. Frank, suffering a migraine, remains at the house alone. At the tavern, Marvin speaks to two older men regarding the town's paranormal activities and feels it is nothing but a case of mass hysteria. The men bring up a boy murdering his whole family and possibly being possessed, and implying the house Marvin is currently in is likely possessed. At the same time, Debbie encounters Mrs. Moriarty again in the bathroom, where she obscurely rants and raves about the priest who once lived in the home.

The next day, Mrs. Moriarty again stops by the house, but is confronted by an unseen assailant and thrown down the basement staircase to her death. Her murder is inadvertently recorded on a video camcorder Bill left in the house. Meanwhile, Debbie has a disturbing vision of a man hanging from a tree in the front of the house. Police are summoned after Mrs. Moriarty's body is found, and a detective tells Marvin about her connection to the house; he also divulges that police identified the murderer of the priest, a local teenage boy, but that he hanged himself before he was apprehended.

Abigail is disturbed by the event and leaves. Marvin begins attempting to decipher Debbie's dream diaries, which Bill realizes consist of Latin exorcism writing. Meanwhile, Debbie suffers a nightmare in which she witnesses the truth of the priest's murder: He was shot to death by his illegitimate son, conceived during a sexual tryst with a female parishioner, who sought vengeance for being abandoned. She awakens and searches for Marvin, whom she finds dead in the confession booth in the basement. There, she is confronted by Frank, now possessed by the priest's illegitimate son. Meanwhile, police investigating Mrs. Moriarty's murder review the video tape, and are able to identify Frank as the perpetrator based on his shoes, which are caught on tape.

Meanwhile, Frank chases Debbie through the house, during which she disfigures him by burning his face. He continues to pursue her, attempting to impale her with a processional cross. Debbie manages to stop him by shooting at him with a nail gun. Abigail returns and finds Frank, apparently dead, but he reawakens and begins strangling her. Using the processional cross, Debbie stabs Frank through the chest, impaling him to death. Later, Debbie and Abigail are escorted out of the house by police. A detective shows Debbie a photograph of an infant boy—the priest's illegitimate son—found at the crime scene. He asks if it is hers, to which she responds that it belongs to the house.

== Cast ==
- Kim Coates as Frank
- Dawna Wightman as Debbie
- Helen Hughes as Mrs. Moriarty
- David Stein as Marvin
- Anthony Dean Rubeš as Bill
- Cassandra Gava as Abigail
- Jan Rubeš as Priest
- Scott Yaphe as Thin Boy
- Mark Camacho as Krabel

== Production ==
The film was shot in Quebec.

The film has a plot line and back-story completely unique to this film and other than the mention of the DeFeo murders, appears to be in no way connected to the previous films. Some fans believed that the house is linked to 112 Ocean Avenue through the tunnel from the first three films. A brief reference is made to the DeFeo murders and to the town's supernatural history.

== Release ==
The film was shot from April 12, 1989 - May 12, 1989, and released directly-to-video by Vidmark Entertainment on June 6, 1990. In the Philippines, the film was released in theaters as Amityville Horror 1993 on December 9, 1993.

Vinegar Syndrome (under license from Canadian International Pictures) released the film for the first time on Blu-ray on October 25, 2022, making it exclusively available through their online store until it will be distributed by other retailers beginning November 29, 2022.

=== Critical response ===
Cavett Binion of the website AllMovie wrote of the film: "This fifth installment in the tiresome horror series is so far removed from its creatively depleted source material that one wonders why the filmmakers bothered to use the "Amityville" reference in the title. In fact, there is some question as to whether the haunted house featured here is even supposed to be the same accursed residence as established in the four prior chapters."

It currently has a 16% rating on Rotten Tomatoes.

== Works cited ==
- Vatnsdal, Caelum (2004). They Came From Within: A History of Canadian Horror Cinema. Arbeiter Ring Publishing. ISBN 9781894037211.
