= Amityville Dollhouse =

1996 film by Steve White

- Promotional poster
- Directed by: Steve White
- Written by: Joshua Michael Stern
- Produced by: David Newlon; Zane W. Levitt; Steve White; Mark Yellen
- Starring: Robin Thomas; Starr Andreeff
- Cinematography: Thomas L. Callaway
- Edited by: Kert Vandermeulen
- Music by: Ray Colcord
- Distributed by: Republic Pictures
- Release dates: October 2, 1996 (UK); February 18, 1997 (US)
- Running time: 92 minutes
- Country: United States
- Language: English

Amityville Dollhouse is a 1996 American supernatural horror film directed by Steve White and starring Robin Thomas, Allen Cutler, Lenore Kasdorf, and Lisa Robin Kelly. Released direct-to-video, it was the eighth film in the Amityville Horror film series, inspired by Jay Anson's 1977 novel The Amityville Horror. This was the last film in the series released before the first installment was remade nine years later.

The film follows the Martin family who find themselves haunted after discovering a dollhouse replica of 112 Ocean Avenue—the site of the Amityville hauntings—on their property, which is possessed by a powerful demon.

== Plot ==
Newlyweds Bill and Claire Martin move their new family into a new house constructed by Bill himself. Shortly after moving in, Bill decides to investigate the locked shed of the property's previous owner. He finds a dollhouse (modeled after 112 Ocean Avenue in Amityville, New York) and brings it into the garage. Later that night, Bill notices the fireplace in the house turns on by itself, overheating the entire home. He has a hallucination of his daughter Jessica burning to death in the fireplace. The following morning, Claire finds the dollhouse in the garage and suggests giving it to Jessica for her birthday, as their car had rolled forward in the garage by itself and wrecked the present they'd bought her. At her birthday party, Jessica's aunt Marla and uncle Tobias arrive. Jessica is elated over the dollhouse and finds a chest of miniature dolls inside it. Her aunt and uncle, however, seem inexplicably nervous regarding the toys.

In the ensuing days, numerous strange incidents occur: Jimmy, Claire's son, loses his pet mouse, which finds its way into the dollhouse; simultaneously, Jessica is confronted by an enormous white mouse hiding under her bed. Claire also begins to have unexpected sexual urges toward Todd, Bill's teenage son, and fantasizes about him while having sex with Bill. Nightmares plague Bill about voodoo dolls, demons, and his family being murdered. In conversation with Marla, Bill reveals he suffered from similar dreams as a child, including a premonitory dream of his parents dying in a fire, which came true. Jimmy also experiences supernatural visitations from his deceased father, who appears to him as a decaying zombie, urging him to murder Bill.

One night Todd's girlfriend, Dana, sneaks over to the home. They head off to the shed and find newspaper clippings about the foundation on which Bill built their new home. The clippings reveal that the previous owner of the property was suspected of burning down his house with his family still inside. They surmise that the new house was built around the fireplace from the original home, as that was only thing left standing after the fire. The two begin to have sex, but a large fly attacks them and tries to burrow into Todd's ear. The following evening, Bill and Claire go out for dinner, leaving Todd to babysit Jimmy and Jessica. Todd invites Dana over and sends the children to bed. While Todd makes cocktails in the kitchen, Dana's hair inexplicably catches fire while sitting next to the fireplace, leaving her in a coma with disfiguring burns. Todd blames his father for the accident, believing a faulty coil in the fireplaces gas line caused it.

Meanwhile, Marla and Tobias, who practice magic, have taken one of the dolls from Jessica's dollhouse. They perform a ritual on the doll and watch it come to life, possessed by a demon whom Tobias identifies as “Gamigin”. Objects begin to fly around their home, injuring Marla, and Tobias stabs the doll with a knife, impaling a large fly. Later, Claire finds an unexplained bruise on Jimmy's face and believes Bill hit him. Jimmy tries to tell her that it was his deceased father who hit him because he tried to warn Bill about his father's intention to kill him, but she doesn't believe it. She shuts Bill out of the house, only to be confronted by the zombie of her deceased husband, who ties her and Jimmy up and forces them to sit by the fireplace. Bill attempts to enter the house through the garage but is knocked unconscious by carbon monoxide fumes from his car, which begins running by itself. Tobias arrives at the home and is able to save Bill. The two enter the home: Tobias has the voodoo doll he had taken from the dollhouse with him.

Tobias and Bill fight with the zombie, and Tobias calls to Jimmy to get the doll; Jimmy throws the voodoo doll into the fireplace, causing the zombie to disappear. Todd is then visited by an apparition of Dana, who is in the hospital: she attempts to kill him, but Claire intercedes. The family attempts to flee the house but cannot find Jessica. Scrawled on a piece of paper, they find a list of observations Jessica has made about the dollhouse, one of which reads: "My hand disappears in the fireplace." Bill realizes the fireplace is a portal to somewhere else. Bill and Tobias enter the fireplace and realize they have entered the dollhouse. They find Jessica on the floor, surrounded by bloodied remnants of the voodoo dolls. Tobias casts a protective spell, allowing Bill and Jessica to flee: Tobias, however, is dragged away by the demons that have escaped from the dolls, of which Gamigin is the leader. Bill destroys the dollhouse by tossing it into the fireplace. As they flee in their car, the house explodes behind them.

== Cast ==
- Robin Thomas as Bill Martin
- Starr Andreeff as Claire Martin
- Allen Cutler as Todd Martin
- Rachel Duncan as Jessica Martin
- Jarrett Lennon as Jimmy Martin
- Clayton Murray as Jimmy's Father
- Franc Ross as Tobias
- Lenore Kasdorf as Marla Martin
- Lisa Robin Kelly as Dana

== Musical score ==
Amityville Dollhouse

Soundtrack album by Ray Colcord
- Released: June 1, 1999
- Recorded: 1996
- Genre: Film score
- Length: 45:18
- Label: Citadel

The film features an official score by composer Ray Colcord, which was released on compact disc in 1999.

No.	Title	Writer(s)	Length
1.	"Main Title"		2:51
2.	"Dana/Dead Dad"		4:49
3.	"Todd's Photo"		1:55
4.	"Seance"		2:18
5.	"Wasp"		1:58
6.	"More Dead Dad"		3:18
7.	"Battle"		7:24
8.	"I Had a Dream"		1:09
9.	"It's Alive"		1:56
10.	"Bill's Dream"		1:14
11.	"You Did This"		0:45
12.	"Father"		2:28
13.	"Claire's Fantasy"		1:29
14.	"Monster Mouse"		0:31
15.	"Dana 451"		2:07
16.	"Shed"		1:32
17.	"Dig We Must"		2:21
18.	"Rotten Day"		1:34
19.	"Dad Again"		0:44
20.	"Along Came a Spider"		0:40
21.	"Epilogue"	Colcord; Sam Cardon	3:08

== Release ==
The film was released on VHS by Republic Pictures in 1996 and later on DVD by Lionsgate on September 28, 2004. In 2019, Vinegar Syndrome (under license from Multicom Entertainment Group) released the film on Blu-ray in the US which was included in the boxset "Amityville: The Cursed Collection". In 2022, the film was released on Blu-ray in the UK courtesy of Screenbound Pictures Ltd.

== Reception ==
The film was featured in the 2010 book 150 Movies You Should Die Before You See, in which reviewer Steve Miller wrote: "Don't bother asking why someone built a dollhouse replica of a place on Long Island. And don't ask how it ended up in a shack in the desert, or how it became filled with evil—the writer and director barely gave any thought to the subject. The film is rendered even less scary by the fact that no one seems particularly distressed by the weird developments." In 2015, TV Guide rated it two out of five stars, writing: "The awkwardly titled eighth film (!) in the Amityville series has its moments but adds little to the franchise or the horror genre in general."

== See also ==
- Killer toys
