= Amityville Exorcism =

- DVD released by Wild Eye Releasing
- Directed by: Mark Polonia
- Written by: Billy D'Amato; Agung Bagus
- Screenplay by: Billy D'Amato
- Produced by: Mark Polonia
- Starring: Marie DeLorenzo; Jeff Kirkendall; James Carolus; Steve Diasparra; Ken Van Sant; Todd Carpenter; Austin Dragovich
- Cinematography: Lukas K. Reynolds
- Edited by: Mark Polonia
- Music by: Agung Bagus; John Rayl; Greg Stanina
- Production company: Polonia Brothers Entertainment
- Distributed by: Wild Eye Releasing
- Release date: January 3, 2017
- Running time: 77 minutes
- Country: United States
- Language: English

Amityville Exorcism is a 2017 American horror film directed by Mark Polonia and written by Billy D'Amato and Agung Bagus. It was released direct-to-video, and is the eighteenth film to be inspired by Jay Anson's 1977 novel The Amityville Horror. The film stars Jeff Kirkendall as Father Benna, a Catholic priest who, with the help of troubled father Jeremy Dukane (James Carolus), performs an exorcism on the man's daughter Amy (Marie DeLorenzo) after the girl is possessed by a demon that originates from 112 Ocean Avenue, a haunted house in Amityville, New York. It was followed by two sequels, Amityville Island in 2020 and Amityville in Space in 2022.

== Plot ==
A general contractor named Charles Humes is sentenced to death after killing his wife and two daughters with a hammer in Amityville, New York. The day before his execution, Charles meets with Father Benna. Charles confides in Benna that he committed the familicide due to being possessed by demons that he claims reside within lumber that he took from 112 Ocean Avenue, a local house that was haunted until an exorcism was performed on it by Benna's brother, Father Jonas. Jonas died during the exorcism, and his death still haunts Benna. Charles added the tainted wood to his own home, as well as various other properties, which he gives a list of to Benna. One of the houses that Charles worked on is inhabited by Amy Dukane and her abusive alcoholic father, Jeremy. Jeremy is widowed due to his wife, Bonnie, dying in a drunk driving crash that was caused by Jeremy.

Amy and Benna both start being terrorized by a demon, which disembowels a burglar before infusing Amy with an amalgamation of lesser demons called Legion. While Amy is out for a walk in the woods, where she and the demon kill a photographer, Jeremy is visited by Benna. Jeremy is skeptical of Benna's claim that his house is haunted, until Amy torments him from afar with visions of Bonnie. Amy murders her boyfriend, Robby, while the house is being blessed by Benna. When Amy returns, she is weakened by the blessing, and tied to her bed by Benna and Jeremy. Amy assumes a hideous visage, plays mind games with Jeremy, and animates dolls that she uses to attack Benna. Benna fends off the toys, and begins performing an exorcism on Amy. Amy breaks free of her restraints, forces Jeremy out of the room, and summons the demon that had implanted her with Legion. The demon taunts Benna, who responds by drawing a cross on it with blood from a wound that he had been given by Amy. The bloody cross banishes the demon and Legion back to Hell, freeing Amy.

Amy and Jeremy reconcile, while Benna heads out to deal with all of the other properties that had 112 Ocean Avenue's cursed wood added to them by Charles.

== Cast ==
- Marie DeLorenzo as Amy Dukane
- Jeff Kirkendall as Father Benna
- James Carolus as Jeremy Dukane
- Steve Diasparra as Father Jonas
- Ken Van Sant as Charles Humes
- Titus Himmelberger as Photographer
- Todd Carpenter as Burglar
- Kathryn Sue Young as Bonnie Dukane
- Austin Dragovich as Robby
- Samantha Young as Daughter
- Claire Young as Daughter
- Yolie Canales as Mrs. Humes

== Reception ==
Tex Hula ranked Amityville Exorcism as the worst of the twenty-one Amityville films that he reviewed for Ain't It Cool News, and derisively stated, "Everything about this movie is incompetent. It's not even bad on a level you can laugh at it. It looks like it was made for a public access channel. The only good thing I can say about it, the story is pretty consistent with the rest of the Amityville line. But it's the worst movie I've ever sat through willingly." Horror News found that the film consisted almost entirely of "fairly standard exorcism story beats" that it failed to use "in a new or interesting way" before concluding, "There was not a lot of good to Amityville Exorcism. It's mostly a poorly made movie that only used the Amityville name to get the few viewers it had. I would say it's a watchable movie, but I see so much on the lower end of quality that I find a lot of things watchable. This was not a good movie. If you're a fan of Mark Polonia's work, since he has a lot of work, you might appreciate it. For anyone else, pass on this one for something, almost anything else."
