= Amityville: Vanishing Point =

- Film poster
- Directed by: Dylan Greenberg
- Written by: Dylan Greenberg; Selena Mars; Jurgen Azazel Munster; Ezra Pailer
- Story by: Dylan Greenberg
- Produced by: Jurgen Azazel Munster
- Starring: Selena Mars; Amanda Flowers; Mickala McFarlane; Jurgen Azazel Munster; Sara Kaiser; Max Husten; Alyssa Marie C. Rose Kaplan; Victor Sheely; Taylor MacLeod
- Cinematography: Dylan Greenberg
- Edited by: Dylan Greenberg
- Production company: Disck Pictures
- Distributed by: Disck Pictures
- Release date: 1 April 2016 (United States)
- Running time: 92 minutes
- Country: United States
- Language: English

Amityville: Vanishing Point is a 2016 American horror film written and directed by Dylan Greenberg, and co-written by Selena Mars, Jurgen Azazel Munster, and Ezra Pailer. It premiered on video on demand before being released direct-to-video, and is the fourteenth film to be inspired by Jay Anson's 1977 novel The Amityville Horror. Selena Mars, Amanda Flowers, and Sara Kaiser star as the residents of an Amityville, New York boarding house that is plagued by paranormal activity after the mysterious death of their friend Margaret East (Sofe Cote).

== Plot ==
The film opens with the death of a young woman named Margaret East in Amityville, New York. Margaret lived in a Bohemian boarding house, and her death is being investigated by Hank Denton, an obnoxious man who is referred to as both a detective and an FBI agent. All of Margaret's friends find Denton rude and annoying, except for Sentinel Ernie, who convinces her mother, Aphrodite, the boarding house's owner, to let Denton stay at the Amityville Boarding House, which is being haunted by both a demon and Margaret's ghost.

Denton repeatedly experiences strange dreams and hallucinations while investigating Margaret's death, and becomes convinced, though without any real evidence, that there is a cult that is operating out of the Amityville Boarding House. When Sentinel tries to seduce him, Denton attacks her before ejaculating all over the room while staring at a Keith Hernandez baseball card. Later, Denton and Brigitta, the lesbian lover of Bermuda, Aphrodite's other daughter, are led to a cemetery by a figure that they presume is Margaret. A gravedigger and another resident of the boarding house convince Brigitta to hold a séance, which is attended by Denton. Supernatural events that occur during the séance and a dream that she experienced at the same time as Denton inspire Bermuda to try and gain access to the sealed basement of the boarding house (where her aunt was mysteriously found dead years ago) using an Ace of spades card.

Bermuda is attacked by an unseen presence while in the basement, where she finds a videotape made by Margaret. The tape depicts Margaret rambling about how the house protects them and about how they are "the beautiful ones" described by John B. Calhoun. A gun-totting Denton barges into the room, interrupts the tape, and leaves with Brigitta. Bermuda is terrorized by illusions of an automated hand and giant insect legs, and accidentally bludgeons Sentinel. The demon scares Aphrodite and causes her to fall down a flight of stairs, killing her and allowing her ghost to save Brigitta from Denton. Denton is garroted by Brigitta while being restrained by Aphrodite's ghost, and dies in the same place as Margaret. The film ends with Bermuda and Brigitta reuniting on a train crossing the Manhattan Bridge.

== Cast ==
- Selena Mars as Ms. Aphrodite Ernie
- Amanda Flowers as Brigitta Lynn
- Mickala McFarlane as Bermuda Ernie
- Jurgen Azazel Munster as Hank Denton
- Sara Kaiser as Sentinel Ernie
- Max Husten as Jack Rockwell
- Victor M. Sheely as Father Mars
- Alyssa Marie C. as Moth Abacus
- Rose Kaplan as Maude Abacus
- Jesse Yungbei as The Demon
- David Marquise as Antonia Abacus
- Taylor MacLeod as Ricki Flynt
- Alexia Giovanna as Joan Flynt
- Neva Gentlman as Neva
- Lucy Love as Sodia
- Louisa Ashleigh as Glass Sky
- Carl Peckham as Sardu the Gravedigger
- Lys Obsidian as Lys Obsidian Absurd
- Piera Yerkes as Stephanie Garlic
- Liz Grayson as Errol Stone
- Peter Russell as Silent Pete
- Aaden Grushkin as Altair, the Bassist
- Dan Correll as Ranston Cubicle
- Max Gnar as Max Gnar
- John Patrick Brennan as Bacon Cheeseburger
- Julia Simonello as Ace of Spades Woman
- Emily Smykal as Dancer in the Dark
- Lloyd Kaufman as Elron Randall
- Catherine Corcoran as Cara
- Zac Amico as Vaggio
- Neon Music as Self
- Dean Dempsey as Self
- Sofe Cote as Margaret East

== Release ==
Amityville: Vanishing Point was released on video on demand through Amazon, VHX, and other streaming platforms on April 1, 2016.

== Reception ==
Tex Hula ranked Amityville: Vanishing Point as the sixth worst of the twenty-one Amityville films that he reviewed for Ain't It Cool News, and opined that it was "Definitely the most oddball of the Amityville movies" and "Sometimes entertainingly bad, most of the times painfully bad." Fellow Ain't It Cool News reviewer Mark L. Miller was slightly more lenient towards the film, writing, "As an homage, this film has a lot of bright spots, as it does kind of capture the feel of Lynch's bizarre world. But this is definitely a rough film. Scenes go on way too long. The film is filled with non-actors. And the dialog is often pretentious and sophomoric attempts to be deep. Those without the stomach for low fi cinema will definitely want to give this a pass, but this is a film worth supporting."
