= The Kondelik Brothers =

American filmmakers

Jon Kondelik and James Kondelik, twin brothers, known together professionally as The Kondelik Brothers, are American filmmakers. They are known for their work in the films M Is for Masochist, Behind the Walls and Hornet.

== Career ==
Jon and James first teamed up to write and direct the short film, M Is for Masochist, entered into ABCs of Death 2 film competition. In 2014, their film Airplane vs. Volcano, starring Dean Cain, produced by The Asylum. James is known as a film editor for the films Zombie Apocalypse and Abraham Lincoln vs. Zombies and Jon is known as an actor for the films The Amityville Haunting and 12/12/12.

In 2018, their first horror film Behind the Walls, starring Vanessa Angel, Reggie Lee and Lew Temple, released under the twin brother's Dual Visions Production. Their latest film Hornet, is produced by The Asylum.

== Filmography ==
Year	Title	Director	Writer	Producer	Note
2025	Pitfall	James	James Kondelik and Victor Rose		Feature Film
2019	Arctic Apocalypse	Jon	Eric Paul Erickson, Bill Hanstock, and Robert Hensley	Jon	Feature Film
2018	Hornet	Jon and James			Feature Film
2018	Jurassic Galaxy	Jon and James		Jon and James	Feature Film
2018	Snake Outta Compton		Jon and James	Jon and James	Feature Film
2018	Behind the Walls	Jon and James	Jon and James	Jon and James	Feature Film
2016	Dam Sharks	Jon and James			TV movie
2016	Drowners	Jon and James	Jon	Jon and James	Short Film
2016	Blood Brothers			Jon and James	Feature Film
2015	All Hallows' Eve 2	Jon and James	Jon and James		Feature Film
2014	Airplane vs. Volcano	Jon and James	Jon and James		Feature Film
2013	M Is for Masochist	Jon and James	Jon and James		Short Film
2013	Rest for the Wicked	Jon and James			TV series
