= High Hopes: The Amityville Murders =

1981 book by Gerard Sullivan and Harvey Aronson

- Author: Gerard Sullivan and Harvey Aronson
- Language: English
- Publisher: Bell
- Publication date: July 1, 1981
- Publication place: United States
- Media type: Print (Hardback & Paperback)

High Hopes: The Amityville Murders is a 1981 horror fiction book written by Gerard Sullivan and Harvey Aronson and tells the story of the 1974 Amityville murders. A 2018 film was based on the book.

== Plot summary ==
The book is based on trial testimony of the 1974 murder of the DeFeo family and takes place from the prosecutor's point of view. Gerard Sullivan was the prosecutor in the case. The book is centered around Ronald DeFeo Jr., who was convicted in the murders, and his nine-year stay at the house on Ocean Ave. It tells how starts to become increasingly more mentally unstable, using drugs, getting into fights. It goes up to how DeFeo Jr. killed his family. Then it goes to the aftermath and the court and eventually his conviction. The book does not deal with anything supernatural and is only about the DeFeos. It also talks about the insanity plea. A very controversial event is also mentioned in the book. The event which is now unverifiable, tells of a 1972 drowning that may have been caused by Ronald DeFeo Jr. The only mention of the haunting is in a sentence at the end of the book.

== Title ==
The title of the book came from author Harvey Aronson, from a sign posted in the DeFeo's front lawn which read "High Hopes". Aronson explained, "When they moved from Brooklyn and when they bought that house that they had High Hopes."

== Reception ==
The book received good reviews. The Boston Herald called it "more frightening than any ghost story".
