= The Amityville Horror (1979 film) =

Film by Stuart Rosenberg

- Theatrical release poster
- Directed by: Stuart Rosenberg
- Screenplay by: Sandor Stern
- Based on: The Amityville Horror by Jay Anson
- Produced by: Elliot Geisinger; Ronald Saland
- Starring: James Brolin; Margot Kidder; Rod Steiger; Murray Hamilton
- Cinematography: Fred J. Koenekamp
- Edited by: Robert Brown Jr.
- Music by: Lalo Schifrin
- Production companies: Cinema 77; Professional Films, Inc.
- Distributed by: American International Pictures
- Release dates: July 24, 1979 (Museum of Modern Art); July 27, 1979 (U.S.)
- Running time: 118 minutes
- Country: United States
- Language: English
- Budget: $4.7 million
- Box office: $86.4 million

The Amityville Horror is a 1979 American supernatural horror film directed by Stuart Rosenberg, and starring James Brolin, Margot Kidder, and Rod Steiger. The film follows young couple George and Kathy Lutz who purchase a home haunted by combative supernatural forces. It is based on Jay Anson's 1977 book of the same name, which documented the alleged paranormal experiences of the Lutz family who briefly resided in the Amityville, New York home where Ronald DeFeo Jr. committed the mass murder of his family in 1974. It is the first entry in the long-running Amityville Horror film series, and was remade in 2005.

Executive producer Samuel Z. Arkoff originated the project after purchasing the rights to Anson's book, and it was initially conceived as a television film, which Anson adapted himself. When Arkoff rejected the teleplay, it was reworked by screenwriter Sandor Stern as a feature film. The producers intended to shoot the film in the actual DeFeo residence, but its owners denied them permission. Filming instead began on location in Toms River, New Jersey in October 1978, followed by interior shoots occurring at the Metro-Goldwyn-Mayer sound stages in Los Angeles, which were completed just before the Christmas holiday.

The Amityville Horror premiered at the Museum of Modern Art on July 24, 1979, before receiving a wide theatrical release three days later. The film was a major commercial success and one of the most profitable films released by its distributor, American International Pictures. It went on to gross over $80 million in North America, becoming one of the highest-grossing independent films of all time, as well as one of the highest-grossing horror films in cinema history. Though met with largely unfavorable critical reviews at the time of its release, composer Lalo Schifrin's musical score earned the film Golden Globe and Academy Award nominations, while Kidder received a Saturn Award nomination for Best Actress.

Critical reception has warmed over time, and some scholars have considered the film a classic of the horror genre, (Note: In Now a Terrifying Motion Picture!: Twenty-Five Classic Works of Horror Adapted from Book to Film (2012), film scholar James F. Broderick notes that the film continues to make critics' lists of the best horror films of all time.) and it is widely regarded as a seminal entry in the sub-genre of the contemporary haunted house film. In his 1981 non-fiction book, Danse Macabre, horror author Stephen King interprets the film as a parable on the anxieties of homeownership and financial ruin, citing the economic crisis of the 1970s and the film's frequent references to financial matters, a reading which has been similarly assessed by other film scholars.

== Plot ==
In the early morning hours on November 13, 1974, Ronald DeFeo Jr. murders his entire family with a rifle at their home of 112 Ocean Avenue in Amityville, New York.

One year later, middle-class newlyweds George and Kathy Lutz move into the house with Kathy's three children from a prior marriage: Greg, Matt, and Amy. Despite George's irreligiousness, Kathy, a nominal Roman Catholic, requests Jesuit priest Father Frank Delaney to bless the home. Delaney arrives while the family is out boating. Upon entering the house, Delaney is swarmed by flies upstairs and hears a hostile voice ordering him to leave, causing him to flee. The next day, Kathy's aunt Helena, a nun, visits the house but becomes violently ill and leaves abruptly, confounding Kathy.

The Lutzes' domestic life begins a sharp decline over the ensuing weeks: George becomes uncharacteristically volatile and abusive, and obsesses over keeping the home warm with firewood, despite Kathy's insistence that it is not cold. George recurrently awakens at 3:15 a.m.—the same time the DeFeos were murdered—while Kathy suffers disturbing nightmares. One night before Kathy's brother Jimmy's engagement party, $1,500 in cash, to be paid to the caterer, inexplicably goes missing from the house. Meanwhile, Jackie, the babysitter watching Amy for the evening, is locked inside a bedroom closet by an unseen force. Further unexplained incidents occur: one of the two boys suffers a crushed hand when a sash window falls on it, and Amy has an imaginary friend, Jody, who seems malevolent. One night, Kathy glimpses two red, swine-like eyes outside Amy's second-story bedroom window.

Delaney makes several attempts to intervene that seem to be thwarted by unusual accidents and occurrences: his phone calls to the home are frequently met with static by Kathy, and on one occasion, his car malfunctions en route to the house, nearly causing a fatal crash. Convinced there are demonic forces at work, Delaney grows frustrated by the lack of support from his superiors in the diocese. Meanwhile, George's land surveying business begins to suffer due to his lack of attendance, concerning his business partner, Jeff. Jeff's wife, Carolyn, who has psychic proclivities, is both repelled and intrigued by the feelings she experiences when she is at the house.

In the home's basement, Carolyn is drawn to a brick wall that the family dog, Harry, has repeatedly scratched at, and she begins dismantling it with a hammer. Discovering the damage, George takes down the rest of the wall, uncovering a small room with red walls. Carolyn, in terror, shrieks that they have found "the passage... to Hell!", her voice resembling that of Father Delaney. Later that night, Delaney prays passionately at his pulpit for God to save the family, before he inexplicably loses his sight and falls catatonic.

Kathy visits the library to research the property's history and finds county records suggesting that the house was built atop a Shinnecock burial ground and that a known Satanic worshipper named John Ketchum once lived on the land. She also discovers news clippings about the DeFeo murders and notices Ronald DeFeo's striking resemblance to George.

The paranormal events culminate that night during a rainstorm: blood oozes from the walls and down the staircase; Jody, appearing as a large, red-eyed pig, is seen through a window; and a seemingly possessed George attempts to kill the children with an axe, but regains his wits after Kathy intervenes. After falling through the basement stairs into a pit of black sludge while rescuing Harry, George and the rest of the family drive away, abandoning their home and belongings. A closing intertitle reads: "George and Kathleen Lutz and their family never reclaimed their house or their personal belongings. Today they live in another state."

== Cast ==
- James Brolin as George Lutz
- Margot Kidder as Kathleen 'Kathy' Lutz
- Rod Steiger as Father Francis 'Frank' Delaney
- Don Stroud as Father Bolen
- Murray Hamilton as Father Ryan
- John Larch as Father Nuncio
- Natasha Ryan as Amy Lutz
- K. C. Martel as Greg Lutz
- Meeno Peluce as Matt Lutz
- Michael Sacks as Jeff
- Helen Shaver as Carolyn
- Amy Wright as Jackie
- Val Avery as Sergeant Gionfriddo
- Elsa Raven as Mrs. Townsend
- Irene Dailey as Aunt Helena
- Marc Vahanian as Jimmy
- Ellen Saland as Jimmy's Wife
- Eddie Barth as Agucci
- James Tolkan as Coroner
- Brian Bruderlin as Ronald DeFeo Jr. (uncredited)

== Themes ==
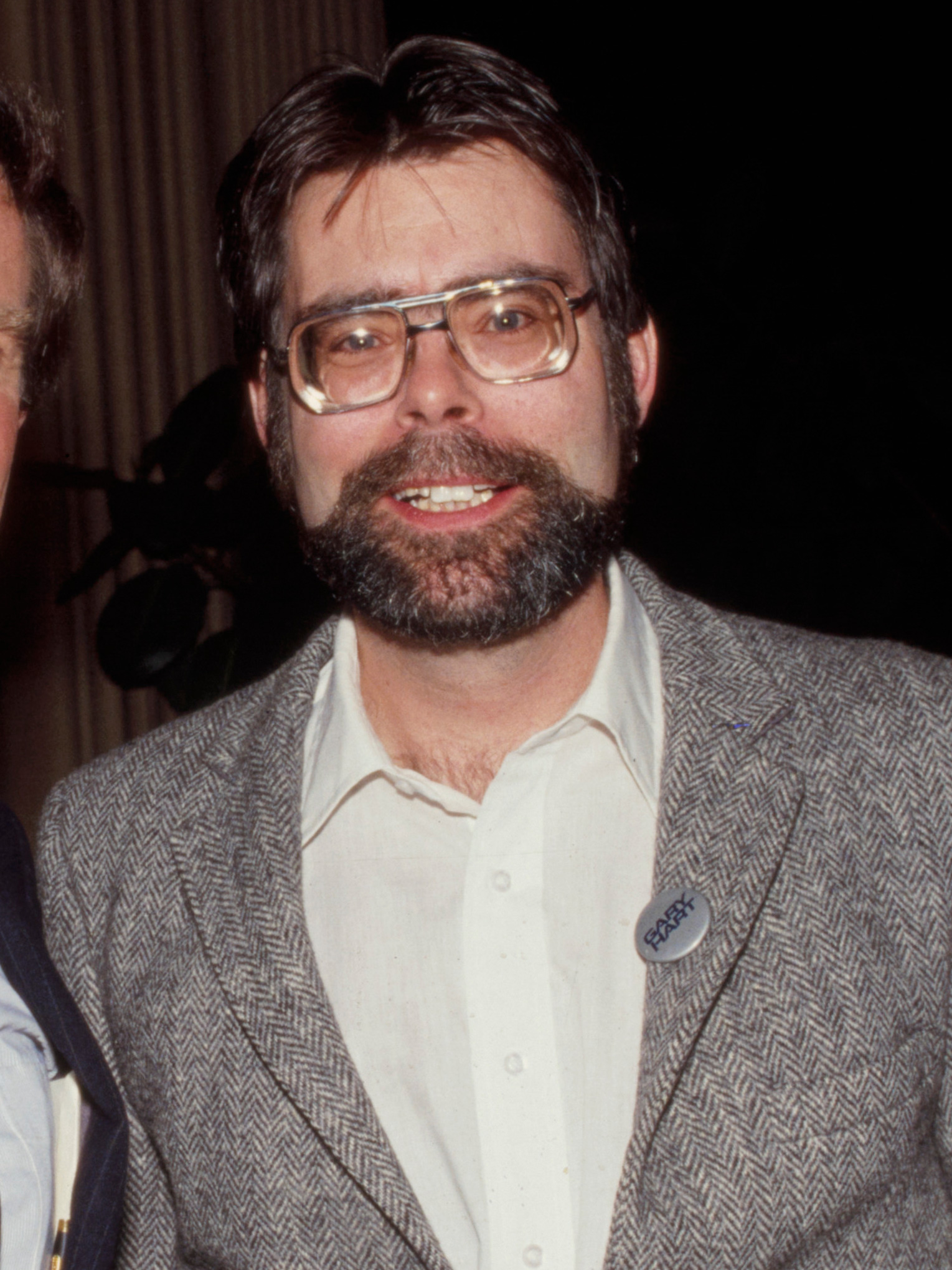
Horror author Stephen King popularly interpreted the film as a parable on the financial anxieties of homeownership.

In his 1983 non-fiction book Danse Macabre, horror author Stephen King analyzed The Amityville Horror, identifying its numerous metaphors regarding anxiety over homeownership and financial turmoil, citing the 1973–1975 recession and the energy crisis of the 1970s, interpreting the film as a parable on American financial distress. At the time of the film's release, King had unfavorably reviewed the film for Rolling Stone, in which he deemed it a "simplistic and transparent" story, an assertion he recanted in Danse Macabre, writing that the "canards" who dismissed it "really miss the point, and as a lifelong horror fan, I should have known it. Stupid, simplistic, and transparent are also perfectly good words to describe the tale of The Hook, but that doesn't change the fact that the story is an enduring classic of its kind."

King attributed the film's significant commercial success to audiences identifying with the lead characters George (James Brolin) and Kathy Lutz (Margot Kidder), a middle-class couple who take a large financial risk in purchasing a home, only for it to have dire intrapersonal consequences within the family. Summarizing its thematic core, he wrote: "The Amityville Horror, beneath its ghost-story exterior, is really a financial demolition derby."

Writer Tony Williams echoes King's analysis of the film in his 1996 book Hearths of Darkness: The Family in the American Horror Film, writing that, "despite lapsing into incoherence toward the end," it "contains significant associations between family life, home ownership, and supposedly supernatural horror... [it] is one of the few films that link the economic responsibilities of home ownership to family horror."

Citing King's analysis, literary critic John Kenneth Muir noted in his book Horror Films FAQ: All That's Left to Know About Slashers, Vampires, Zombies, Aliens, and More (2013): "If one follows King's lead, it's easy to contextualize The Amityville Horror as a financial nightmare... Similarly, the movie's dialogue constantly references financial matters. "Bills have to be paid," says one character. "The IRS is calling," warns another. "They'll nickel and dime you to death" is a mantra not just about the bill collectors, perhaps, but a warning about the demons in the house."

== Production ==
=== Development ===
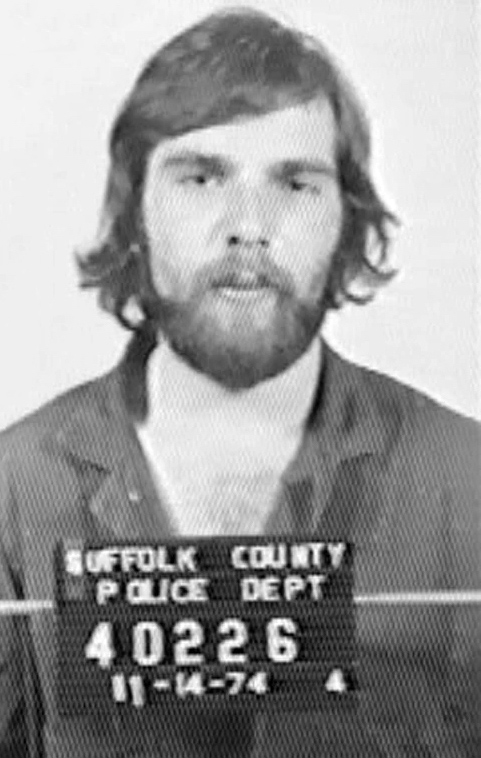
The source book documented alleged supernatural experiences that occurred in the home where Ronald DeFeo Jr. (pictured) murdered his family.

Producer Samuel Z. Arkoff purchased the rights to The Amityville Horror (1977) by author Jay Anson. Promoted as being based on a true story, Anson's book documents the alleged paranormal events experienced by the Lutz family while they resided in the Amityville, New York home where Ronald DeFeo Jr. committed the mass murder of his parents Ronald Sr. and Louise and his siblings in November 1974.

Anson himself wrote a teleplay based on his work, which was intended to be shot as a made-for-television film for CBS. Samuel Z. Arkoff, an executive producer and head of American International Pictures, contacted CBS asking to produce the film as a theatrical feature, offering CBS the rights to broadcast it on their network in exchange. Arkoff subsequently hired screenwriter Sandor Stern to rework Anson's teleplay as a feature film.

=== Casting ===
James Brolin was offered the leading role in the film while he was completing Night of the Juggler, but was initially hesitant about the project. At the time of his casting, the script was unfinished, so Brolin obtained a copy of Anson's novel. Brolin read it until two o'clock in the morning. He had hung up a pair of his pants in the room earlier and during an especially tense passage of the book, the pants fell to the floor. Brolin jumped from his chair in fright. Convinced that the material would make an effective film, Brolin agreed to star. He described the project as a challenge for him, as it was a "pure character role" that he had not yet had the opportunity to play: "It demands a progression of dissipation of personality, so I had to figure out how to portray a man who is losing his sanity during his obsession."

Margot Kidder was cast in the role of Kathy Lutz after her breakthrough performance as Lois Lane in Richard Donner's Superman the year prior. "Basically at that stage you took the jobs you were offered and took the money," Kidder recalled in a later interview. "But [horror films] are fun to make. They make me laugh." In a 2005 interview with the actors, Brolin and Kidder admitted that they clashed in regard to their acting styles, with Brolin remaining committed to closely following the screenplay, while Kidder preferred a more improvisational approach to the material.

Veteran actor Rod Steiger was cast in the role of priest Francis Delaney, and had at the time been experiencing a career slump following his recent open-heart surgery, which left him depressed and made film studios hesitant to hire him due to high insurance costs. Commenting during an interview promoting the film, Steiger said: "This is my last maneuver in letting Hollywood know that I'm in good shape physically."

Natasha Ryan, an eight-year-old experienced child actor, was cast in the role of the Lutz's young daughter, Amy, while K. C. Martel made his feature film debut as one of the family's two sons, Greg.

=== Filming ===
For the location shooting of The Amityville Horror, the production scouted various locations on the East Coast, including in Maine and South Carolina, before settling on Toms River, New Jersey. The producers had initially sought to film at the real Amityville residence in Long Island, New York, but local authorities denied them permission. In August 1978, local Toms River newspapers published articles seeking submissions from homeowners who were willing to lease their residence to the production. The Dutch Colonial home that was ultimately chosen was converted to resemble the 112 Ocean Avenue residence in Amityville. The house was leased by the production for $12,000, and a boathouse was constructed on the property for an additional $31,000.

Principal photography began in Toms River in late October 1978. Additional exteriors were shot at Toms River's Riverwood Park Recreation Center, the Ocean County Courthouse, and Reynolds Tavern. Local police and ambulance workers played extras in the film, and the Toms River Volunteer Fire Company provided the rain during several scenes. The library scene was filmed in the Bishop Building of the Ocean County Library. In order to safely handle an axe on the set, Brolin was trained by a local axe thrower in Toms River.

After completion of the location shooting in November 1978, the production relocated to Los Angeles, where interiors were shot at the Metro-Goldwyn-Mayer (MGM) studio lot. Filming completed at the MGM Sound Stage 26 just before the Christmas holiday, on December 22, 1978.

Largely practical special effects were employed while filming: While shooting the scene in which Father Delaney is swarmed by flies, for example, actor Rod Steiger was doused in sugar water and beer, causing the insects to swarm him.

== Soundtrack ==
Main Title
Audio sample of the main title from The Amityville Horror

Lalo Schifrin was hired to compose the original score for The Amityville Horror. When beginning the composition of the main theme, he was given the static image of the home which plays over the film's opening credits sequence. Recalling his inspiration, Schifrin said: "Since a family with three kids was about to move into the mansion, ignoring its past, I got the idea to write a haunting and distorted lullaby for three children's voices."

In addition to the vocal accompaniment, Schifrin composed the film's score using a harp, celeste, violins, and violas, aspiring to create a "chilling" contrast between the voices and orchestral arrangements. To incorporate more "menacing sounds," he utilized low-pitched string arrangements, a bass clarinet, a brass-muted French horn, and a waterphone.

It is sometimes alleged that Schifrin's score was the one rejected in 1973 for The Exorcist, but Schifrin has denied this in interviews.

Schifrin's score earned the film a nomination an Academy Award for Best Original Score, as well as a Golden Globe Award nomination in the same category.

== Release ==
Distributed by American International Pictures (AIP), The Amityville Horror had its world premiere at the Museum of Modern Art in New York on July 24, 1979, opening a revival exhibition of various films produced and released by the studio. It was given a wide theatrical release in the United States three days later, on July 27, 1979.

=== Marketing ===
The film's production was widely publicized in national media when the studio attempted to concoct stories of "unusual" occurrences on the set (not dissimilar from what was claimed to have occurred during the filming of The Exorcist). According to Brolin, he and Kidder were both asked by the studio and the press, "'Is there weird stuff going on?'... and we were looking for stuff now. We'd have liked to tell them, 'Oh yeah, you wouldn't believe the stuff that happened yesterday—my lunch fell off the table in my lap.'"

In promotion for the film's premiere, Brolin and Kidder visited the actual home at 112 Ocean Avenue, accompanied by the press. Brolin later reflected that the house was much more "condensed" than the location where the film was shot. Both Brolin and Kidder were skeptics of the claims made in the book. "I didn't buy that this really had happened," Kidder said in a 2005 interview. During the press junkets promoting the film, when asked whether she believed the Lutzes' claims, Kidder purportedly turned to the producers, who responded: "We'll never tell." In a 2005 interview, Margot Kidder said "the producers told us we should say all these terrible things happened on the set. It was all bullshit. Nothing happened, but it was funny."

=== Legal disputes ===
Following the film's release, several legal disputes arose involving the Lutz family and the rights to their story. George and Kathy Lutz claimed they were awarded fifty percent of the rights to Anson's book, but missed out on receiving a financial share of the film rights. William Weber, an attorney, was subsequently sued by the Lutzes after he alleged he had helped them fabricate their experiences and sell their story to Anson. In court proceedings for this lawsuit, George Lutz admitted that he had netted $100,000 from the release of the film.

=== Home media ===
Warner Home Video first released The Amityville Horror in a clamshell VHS in 1983. The film has since received numerous DVD releases, the first by MGM Home Entertainment in September 2000, and again by MGM in 2005, whose special features included the theatrical trailer, commentary by parapsychologist Hans Holzer (author of Murder in Amityville), a making of documentary and radio spots. MGM issued the first Blu-ray edition of the film in 2008, followed by a second Blu-ray release from Scream Factory in 2013, as part of The Amityville Trilogy set, which also included Amityville II: The Possession (1982) and Amityville 3-D (1983). 20th Century Fox Home Entertainment re-released a Blu-ray edition in 2014. In September 2022, Vinegar Syndrome issued the film in 4K UHD Blu-ray format for the first time.

== Reception ==
=== Box office ===
The Amityville Horror opened in 748 theaters, and grossed $7.8 million during its opening weekend. It earned over $13.3 million over the course of the week across 810 theaters, marking the second best opening week of the year (to that date) after Moonraker's $14.7 million, and was AIP's largest ever. By September 1979, the studio reported that the film had earned $41 million during its first 31 days of release, which at that time had expanded to 940 theaters.

At the conclusion of its theatrical run, the film had grossed a total of $86.4 million at the U.S. and Canadian box offices (nearly twenty times its budget), making it the second-highest-grossing film of 1979 after Kramer vs. Kramer. The film was one of the most successful films produced by an independent studio at the time and held the record of being the highest-grossing independent film of all time until 1990, when it was surpassed by Teenage Mutant Ninja Turtles.

In 2019, Forbes published an inflation-adjusted list ranking horror film grosses based upon contemporary ticket prices, in which The Amityville Horror ranked as the eighth-highest grossing horror film of all time, with an adjusted gross of $310.3 million at the time of the article's publication.

=== Critical response ===
In his review, Roger Ebert of the Chicago Sun-Times gave the film one and a half stars out of a possible four. Ebert said he had briefly met George Lutz and found his account sincere, but described the film as "dreary and terminally depressing," writing that, "The problem with The Amityville Horror is that, in a very real sense, there's nothing there." Despite the strange events depicted, the film suffered by having no compelling, frightening antagonist such as in The Exorcist or Alien. A staff review in People said Rod Steiger was overacting and that the film was "ridiculous." Tim Pulleine of the Monthly Film Bulletin declared that the film "proves the most satisfying excursion into no-frills spine-chilling for some time," and that "The film is constantly well played and provides Rod Steiger with his best opportunity in ages for all-stops-out bravura." John Simon of the National Review described the film as "dreadful."

Janet Maslin of The New York Times criticized the film for containing repetitive gimmicks, noting that, "so many horror-movie clichés have been assembled under the roof of a single haunted house that the effect is sometimes mind-bogglingly messy. There is apparently very little to which the director, Stuart Rosenberg, will not resort. But he still can't come up with anything more hair-raising than the trick of having one Lutz experience a severe start when he or she doesn't realize other Lutzes are in the room. Whenever Mr. Rosenberg stumbles upon an idea as good as this one, he's bound to repeat it over and over again." The Washington Post's K. C. Summers felt the film was unexciting, writing, "It would be one thing if we were rewarded for sitting through all this with a spinetingling thrill or two, but the movie isn't even scary... Lack of logic is one thing. When a horror movie is boring as well, what's the point?"

Charles Champlin of the Los Angeles Times gave the film a favorable review, writing that, "what it does scarily well is make a very attractive three-story colonial (which would go for 300 thou easily if only it had a different case history) the villain of the piece. The horror is all the more effective because it arises not in some cobwebby and batty castle nor on an unlisted planet in an unnumbered millennium, but around the corner and up our street."

The film has received some better reviews over time, including from historian James F. Broderick, who praised it as "an effective horror movie that succeeds largely because the performers take the over-the-top material seriously... The film is taut, tense, and filled with the bizarre, unsettling events chronicled in the book." In a 2013 assessment, John Kenneth Muir called The Amityville Horror a "blunt and effective horror film" and discussed author Stephen King's analysis of the film's subtext of financial turmoil.

On internet review aggregator Rotten Tomatoes, 33% of 48 surveyed critics gave the film a positive review. Its consensus reads, "Dull and disappointing, the best that can be said for The Amityville Horror is that it set a low bar for its many sequels and remakes". Metacritic, which uses a weighted average, assigned the film a score of 28 out of 100, based on 10 critics, indicating "generally unfavorable" reviews.

== Accolades ==
Award	Category	Nominee(s)	Result	Ref.
Academy Awards	Best Original Score	Lalo Schifrin	Nominated	
Golden Globe Awards	Best Original Score	Lalo Schifrin	Nominated	
Saturn Awards	Best Horror Film		Nominated	
Saturn Awards	Best Actress	Margot Kidder	Nominated	
Stinkers Bad Movie Awards	Worst Picture		Dishonourable Mention	
Stinkers Bad Movie Awards	Worst Director	Stuart Rosenberg	Dishonourable Mention	
Stinkers Bad Movie Awards	Worst Actor	James Brolin	Nominated	
Stinkers Bad Movie Awards	Worst Actress	Margot Kidder	Nominated	
Stinkers Bad Movie Awards	Worst Supporting Actor	Rod Steiger	Dishonourable Mention	
Stinkers Bad Movie Awards	Worst Supporting Actress	Helen Shaver	Nominated	
Stinkers Bad Movie Awards	Worst Screenplay	Sandor Stern	Dishonourable Mention	
Stinkers Bad Movie Awards	Worst On-Screen Couple	James Brolin and Margot Kidder	Nominated	

== Legacy ==
Despite its largely unfavorable critical reception at the time of its original release, The Amityville Horror has been described as a classic of the horror genre by a number of critics and film historians, as well as being regarded as one of the scariest films of all time. Cultural critic Nicholas Mirzoeff wrote in 2012 that "the vulnerability of the local housebody has become part of the wider cultural web of implication" ever since the film's release, summarizing: "In Stuart Rosenberg's film, when George Lutz decides to move into the house, he declares: "A house has no memory." The rest of the film, and this genre of recent horror cinema in general, is dedicated to refuting that proposition."

The British Film Institute included it in a top-ten list of great haunted house films in 2013, noting: "The half-baked debate over how much of this really happened tends to obscure the fact that is rather a good haunted house chiller that didn't really deserve the critical drubbing it got when it was first released... A series of mostly awful sequels followed as well as a pointless 2005 remake, all helping cement Amityville and the story of its haunting in modern legend." In 2018, Esquire ranked it the fifth-scariest haunted house film ever made, and in a 2021 public survey undertaken by SWNS Media Group, it was ranked the seventh-greatest horror film of all time.

In an interview from 2009, Margot Kidder reflected negatively upon the film, calling it "a piece of shit. I couldn't believe that anyone would take that seriously. I was laughing my whole way through it, much to the annoyance of Rod Steiger, who took the whole thing very seriously. At the time, my agent proposed sort of a 'one for me, one for them' policy. That was one for them. It was the crazy Christians who made it a hit. They wanted people to believe in the devil and possessions and haunted houses and all that hooey."

== Related works ==
The film was directly followed by a 1982 prequel, Amityville II: The Possession, and a 1983 sequel, Amityville 3-D. Owing to the film's basis being the historical DeFeo murders, its setting in the real town of Amityville, and the fact that the alleged supernatural events surrounding the Lutz family were publicly recorded, the underlying story elements of the original novel and film have never been subject to copyright restrictions. As a result of this, numerous unrelated films incorporating the word "Amityville" into their titles have been made by various production companies in the years since. As of 2025, a total of thirty-five such films have been produced, with widely varying degrees of connection to the events depicted in the original 1979 film.

In September 2025, it was announced that a new Amityville "reimagining" was in the works for Amazon MGM Studios. David F. Sandberg, known for Lights Out (2013) and Annabelle: Creation (2017), was set to direct.

== See also ==
- List of American films of 1979

== Sources ==
- Arkoff, Samuel Z.; Turbo, Richard (1992). Flying Through Hollywood By the Seat of My Pants. Secaucus, New Jersey: Carol Pub. Group. ISBN 978-1-559-72107-3.
- Broderick, James F. (2012). Now a Terrifying Motion Picture!: Twenty-Five Classic Works of Horror Adapted from Book to Film. Jefferson, North Carolina: McFarland. ISBN 978-0-786-48957-2.
- Francis, James Jr. (2013). Remaking Horror: Hollywood's New Reliance on Scares of Old. Jefferson, North Carolina: McFarland. ISBN 978-0-786-47088-4.
- Gopal, Sangita (2012). Conjugations: Marriage and Form in New Bollywood Cinema. Chicago, Illinois: University of Chicago Press. ISBN 978-0-226-30427-4.
- King, Stephen (1983). Danse Macabre. New York City, New York: Berkeley Books. ISBN 978-0-425-06462-7.
- Mirzoeff, Nicholas (2012). Watching Babylon: The War in Iraq and Global Visual Culture. New York City, New York: Routledge. ISBN 978-1-134-29095-6.
- Muir, John Kenneth (2013). Horror Films FAQ: All That's Left to Know About Slashers, Vampires, Zombies, Aliens, and More. Milwaukee, Wisconsin: Applause Books. ISBN 978-1-480-36681-7.
- Sayad, Cecilia (2021). The Ghost in the Image: Technology and Reality in the Horror Genre. Oxford, England: Oxford University Press. ISBN 978-0-190-06576-8.
- Schifrin, Lalo (2011). Music Composition for Film and Television. Boston, Massachusetts: Berklee Press. ISBN 978-1-476-89948-0.
- Simon, John (2005). John Simon on Film: Criticism 1982-2001. New York City, New York: Applause Books. ISBN 978-1-557-83507-9.
- Smith, Gary A. (2009). The American International Pictures Video Guide. Jefferson, North Carolina: McFarland. ISBN 978-0-786-43309-4.
- Williams, Andrew P. (2017). "Betwixt and Between: Magic, Science, and the Devil's Place in Outer Space". In Brittany, Michele (ed.). Horror in Space: Critical Essays on a Film Subgenre. Jefferson, North Carolina: McFarland. pp. 151–163. ISBN 978-1-476-63062-5.
- Williams, Tony (1996). Hearths of Darkness: The Family in the American Horror Film. London, England: Associated University Presses. ISBN 978-0-838-63564-3.
