= Ebola Rex =

2020 American horror film directed by Dustin Ferguson

- Directed by: Dustin Ferguson
- Written by: Dustin Ferguson
- Produced by: Joseph Kelbie Williamson
- Starring: Mel Novak; Shawn C. Phillips
- Cinematography: Dustin Ferguson
- Edited by: Dustin Ferguson
- Music by: Matthew Festle, Jermey Ashley Pair
- Production company: SCS Entertainment
- Release date: September 1, 2020
- Country: United States
- Language: English

Ebola Rex is a 2020 American horror comedy film written and directed by Dustin Ferguson, starring Mel Novak, Mike Ferguson, and Shawn C. Phillips. The film is available on VOD and DVD on SCS Entertainment.

== Plot ==
A dangerous, captive Tyrannosaurus Rex is injected with the Ebola Virus and escapes a secret government lab to wreak bloody havoc in Southern California. A brave General, Davis, and Dick Steel, an obsessed, renegade soldier, try to stop it.

== Cast ==
- Mel Novak as General Shannon Davis
- Ken May as Dick Steel
- Mike Ferguson as Mike
- Shawn C. Phillips as Protester #1
- Erik Anthony Russo as Erik
- Jennifer Nangle as Malvolia, the Queen of Screams

== Release ==
Ebola Rex premiered on September 1, 2020 and was made available on VOD and DVD on SCS Entertainment. The film was later re-released on June 8, 2021.

== Reception ==
Horror Society was critical of the film while also stating that "Ferguson and company took a time where people are panicking and turned it into a way to express himself. I would have chose a different approach but at least he spent his time making movies and not bitching about politics on the internet." Another review, at Reel Reviews, was more appreciative of the funny aspects of the film, as did other reviews including one at CBR, calling it a mockbuster.

== Legacy ==
=== Sequel ===
In 2021 Ferguson released a sequel, Ebola Rex Versus Murder Hornets. The film had a premiere on YouTube on March 1, 2021 and was released as a limited edition DVD the following day. Mel Novak returned for the sequel.

=== Video games ===
In 2021 SoCal Cinema (SCS) Studios released video game adaptations of Ebola Rex and Ebola Rex Versus Murder Hornets.
