= The Strange and Deadly Occurrence =

- VHS cover
- Directed by: John Llewellyn Moxey
- Written by: Sandor Stern; Lane Slate
- Produced by: Sandor Stern
- Starring: Robert Stack; Vera Miles; L. Q. Jones
- Cinematography: Jack Woolf
- Edited by: Anthony Di Marco; George Shrader
- Music by: Robert Prince
- Production companies: Alpine Productions; Charles Fries Productions
- Distributed by: National Broadcasting Company; Metromedia Producers Corporation
- Release date: September 24, 1974 (United States)
- Running time: 78 min
- Country: United States
- Language: English

The Strange and Deadly Occurrence is a 1974 American made-for-television horror-thriller film directed by John Llewellyn Moxey and written by Sandor Stern and Lane Slate. It originally aired on NBC on September 24, 1974, as part of the network's "Movie of the Week" anthology series. The film stars Robert Stack, Vera Miles, and L. Q. Jones.

== Plot ==
Michael Rhodes, a burned-out tax attorney, moves his wife Christine and teenage daughter Melissa from the city to a secluded country estate, seeking a quieter life. After several months of peaceful residence, the family begins experiencing a series of disturbing events. The electricity fails repeatedly, plumbing issues arise, and the property becomes infested with gophers. Melissa suffers from vivid nightmares and claims to have been touched by an unseen presence in her bedroom. The family dog is found dead in the horse stables under mysterious circumstances.

As the disturbances escalate, Melissa uncovers the property's dark history: a previous owner drowned in the family swimming pool, and an earlier resident was allegedly driven insane after his wife's death. A mysterious stranger, Dr. David Gillgreen, repeatedly offers Rhodes to purchase the house at a generous price, despite never inspecting the property, raising suspicions about his motives. Sheriff Berlinger proves unhelpful, dismissing the family's concerns as typical country living adjustments.

The film builds tension through a series of unsettling sequences, including an attack by a dressmaker's mannequin and persistent, terrifying pounding sounds at night, before reaching its resolution regarding whether the house is genuinely haunted or if someone is deliberately attempting to just drive the Rhodes family away.

== Cast ==
- Robert Stack as Michael Rhodes
- Vera Miles as Christine Rhodes
- Margaret Willock as Melissa Rhodes
- L. Q. Jones as Sheriff Berlinger
- Herb Edelman as Mr. Felix
- Ted Gehring as Dr. David Gillgreen
- Bill McKinney as The Man
- Phil Chambers as Coroner
- Dena Dietrich as Audrey
- James McCallion as Ardie Detweiller
