= The Amityville Horror (2005 film) =

Film by Andrew Douglas

- Theatrical release poster
- Directed by: Andrew Douglas
- Screenplay by: Scott Kosar
- Based on: The Amityville Horror by Jay Anson
- Produced by: Michael Bay; Andrew Form; Brad Fuller
- Starring: Ryan Reynolds; Melissa George; Philip Baker Hall
- Cinematography: Peter Lyons Collister
- Edited by: Roger Barton; Christian Wagner
- Music by: Steve Jablonsky
- Production companies: Metro-Goldwyn-Mayer; United Artists; Dimension Films; Platinum Dunes; Radar Pictures
- Distributed by: MGM Distribution Co. (North America, United Kingdom, Ireland, Australia, New Zealand, France, Germany, Austria and Japan); Miramax International (International)
- Release date: April 15, 2005
- Running time: 89 minutes
- Country: United States
- Language: English
- Budget: $19 million
- Box office: $107.5 million

The Amityville Horror is a 2005 American supernatural horror film directed by Andrew Douglas, and starring Ryan Reynolds, Melissa George, and Philip Baker Hall. It also featured the debut of actress Chloë Grace Moretz. Written by Scott Kosar, it is based on the novel The Amityville Horror by Jay Anson and serves as a remake of the 1979 film of the same name, as well as the ninth film in the Amityville Horror film series.

The film was released in the United States on April 15, 2005, by Metro-Goldwyn-Mayer and Dimension Films. Despite negative reviews from critics, with many calling it derivative to the original film and saying it did not deliver anything new, the film was a commercial success, grossing $107.5 million on a $19 million budget.

== Plot ==
At 3:15 AM on November 13, 1974, Ronald DeFeo Jr. murdered his entire family at their house at 412 Ocean Avenue in Amityville, New York. He claimed that he was persuaded to kill them by voices he heard in the house.

One year later, a married couple George and Kathy Lutz move into the house along with Kathy's three children from a previous marriage, Billy, Michael, and Chelsea. The family soon begin experiencing paranormal events in the house. Chelsea claims that she has befriended a girl named Jodie, a name belonging to one of the murdered DeFeo children.

One night the couple decide to go out and hire a babysitter to watch the three kids. When the babysitter, Lisa, arrives, they find out that she had previously been hired to babysit for the DeFeos. Lisa tells them about the murders that took place in their house. When she goes to Chelsea's room, Chelsea tells her that she is a bad babysitter, claiming that Jodie told her so. Lisa begins to scold Jodie for being the reason behind her getting fired. Then Billy dares Lisa to go inside the closet (the same closet where Jodie was murdered), and she gets locked inside. After a few seconds, she encounters Jodie herself and begs to be let out. She goes into shock and the paramedics arrive to take her away; on the way to the hospital, Lisa tells Kathy that she had seen Jodie.

George's behavior towards Kathy and her children becomes abusive and the paranormal activity continues. One night, George hears the family dog Harry barking in the boathouse. Seemingly possessed, he grabs the axe and proceeds to murder the dog after mistaking it for a demonic apparition. The children look for Harry the next day, with George denying he knows where he is, despite Billy's suspicions.

Kathy asks the priest Father Callaway to bless the house as a protective measure to prevent any future paranormal incidents. But, Father Callaway flees the house when he encounters such occurrences himself. Kathy discovers that the house once belonged to a cult preacher named Reverend Jeremiah Ketcham, whose evil actions towards Native Americans during his "mission" in 17th-century Amityville are said to be the cause of the haunting. Meanwhile, as George is walking through the basement of the house, he encounters the apparitions of the various Native Americans who were tortured and killed there by Ketcham centuries ago. Entering a dimly lit room, George encounters Ketcham himself (though he is not aware of who he is), and the ghostly figure of the evil missionary turns around, picks up a knife, and slits his throat in an act of recreating his suicide, covering George with blood, and causing him to become nearly completely possessed.

Kathy becomes convinced that George's abusive behavior is owed to a spiritual possession. Following urgent advice from Father Callaway, Kathy tries to evacuate her children from the house and escort them to safety, but the possessed George attempts to kill her and the children; Kathy knocks him out to prevent him from doing so and transports him away from the residence via boat. Subsequently, George is released from the spirit's control and the family permanently leaves the house. A title card states that the family left within 28 days of arriving and never returned. Jodie is shown standing in the now-empty house and screaming in terror while the house rearranges itself back to its original state before the family's arrival. Subsequently, she is pulled beneath the floor by a pair of disembodied hands.

== Cast ==
- Ryan Reynolds as George Lutz
- Melissa George as Katherine "Kathy" Lutz
- Jesse James as Billy Lutz
- Jimmy Bennett as Michael Lutz
- Chloë Grace Moretz as Chelsea Lutz
- Rachel Nichols as Lisa
- Philip Baker Hall as Father Callaway
- Isabel Conner as Jodie DeFeo
- Brendan Donaldson as Ronald 'Ronnie' DeFeo Jr.

== Production ==
Although the film is set on Long Island, it was shot in Chicago, Antioch, Buffalo Grove, and Fox Lake, Illinois, and in Salem and Silver Lake, Wisconsin. The house's address was changed to 412 Ocean Avenue as opposed to 112, likely to deter anyone from attempting to visit the real house. The home used in the film, 27618 Silver Lake Road in Salem, is a real 1800s home that was temporarily converted to add the famous quarter-moon "evil eye" windows. The movie facade installed on the house cost $60,000, and remained on the house for some time after production. The quarter-moon windows were preserved in sections of the walls, which still have the bedroom wallpaper from the movie on the inside, and siding with intentionally old-looking paint on the outside. At the time of their removal, the windows were in good shape but appeared "aged" due to the peeling paint used to make them match the house. In 2017, an estate sale was held at the filming house, and the quarter-moon windows, which had been in the attic since filming, were sold. The buyer lives in the same neighborhood and has the windows on display.

MGM claimed the remake was based on new information uncovered during research of the original events, but George Lutz later claimed nobody ever spoke to him or his family about the project. When he initially heard it was underway, his attorney contacted the studio to find out what they had in the planning stages and to express Lutz's belief they did not have the right to proceed without his input. Three letters were sent and none was acknowledged. In June 2004, the studio filed a motion for declaratory relief in federal court, insisting they had the right to do a remake, and Lutz countersued, citing violations of the original contract that had continued through the years following the release of the first film. The case remained unresolved when Lutz died in May 2006.

== Release ==
=== Box office ===
The Amityville Horror opened on 3,323 screens in the United States on April 15, 2005 and earned $23,507,007 on its opening weekend, ranking first in the domestic box office. It eventually grossed $65,233,369 domestically and $42,813,762 in foreign markets for a total worldwide box office of $108,047,131.

=== Critical response ===
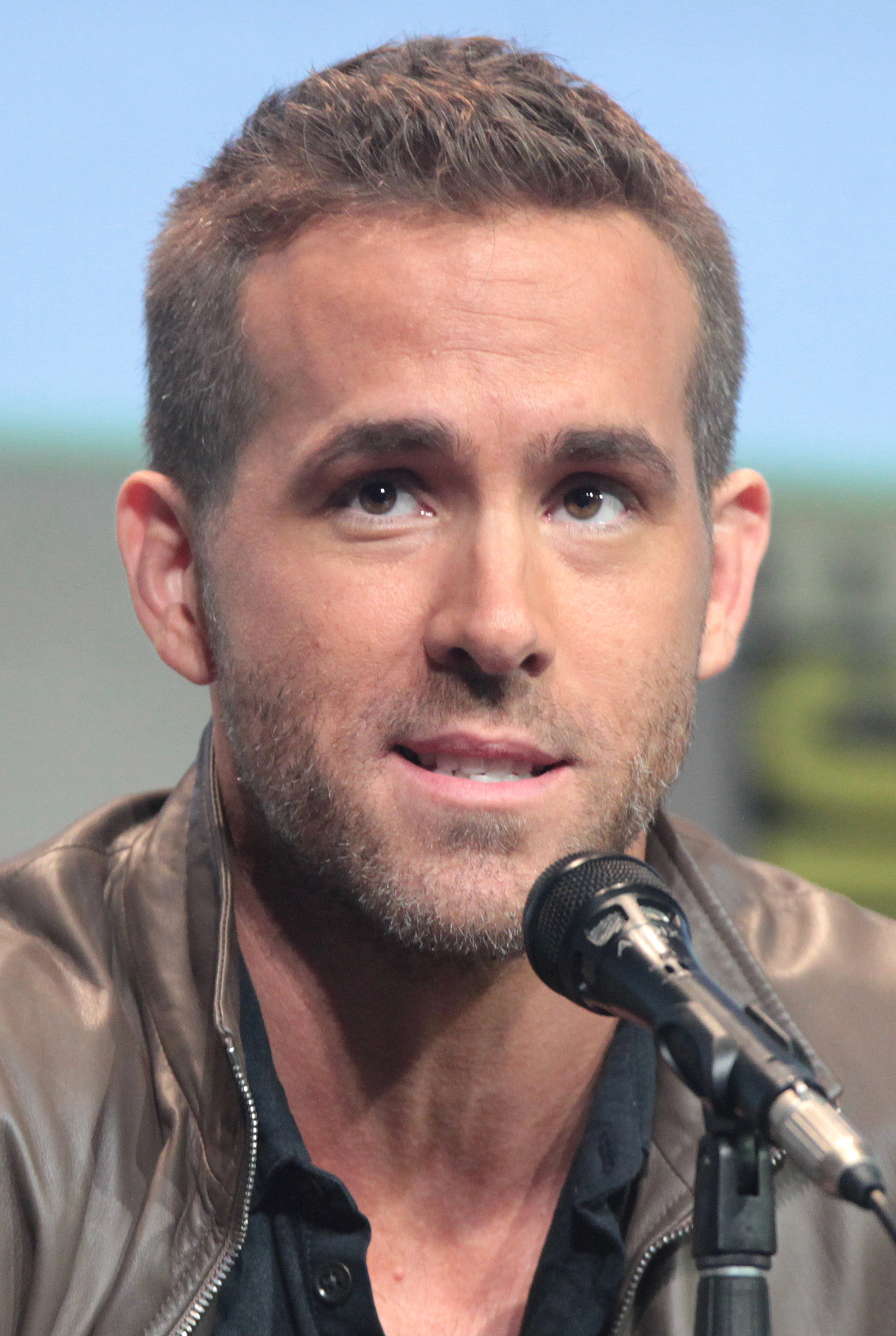
Despite negative reviews, Ryan Reynolds' performance was praised by critics and audience alike.

On the review aggregator website Rotten Tomatoes, 23% of 163 critics' reviews are positive, with an average rating of 4.2/10. The website's consensus reads: "A so-so remake of a so-so original." Metacritic, which uses a weighted average, assigned the film a score of 33 out of 100, based on 31 critics, indicating "generally unfavorable" reviews. Audiences polled by CinemaScore gave the film an average grade of "B" on an A+ to F scale.

Manohla Dargis of The New York Times said, "Low-key creepy rather than outright scary, the new Amityville marks a modest improvement over the original, partly because, from acting to bloody effects, it is better executed, and partly because the filmmakers have downgraded the role of the priest, played in all his vein-popping glory by Rod Steiger in the first film and by a considerably more subdued Philip Baker Hall here." Peter Travers of Rolling Stone rated the film one star and commented, "First-time director Andrew Douglas crams in every ghost cliché, from demonic faces to dripping blood. This house springs so many FX shocks it plays like a theme park ride. Result? It's not scary, just busy. For the real thing, watch Psycho . . . The Shining . . . The Haunting . . . or The Innocents . . . What all those films have in common is precisely what the new Amityville Horror lacks: They know it's what you don't see in a haunted house that fries your nerves to a frazzle." Ruthe Stein of the San Francisco Chronicle thought "The truly shocking thing about the new version is that it's not bloody awful . . . The decision to use minimal computer-generated effects, made for monetary rather than artistic reasons, works to Amityville's advantage. It retains the cheesy look of the 1979 original, pure schlock not gussied up to appear to be anything else."

Marjorie Baumgarten of the Austin Chronicle stated the original film was "an effective little tingler whose frights are steady, implied, and cumulative . . . but in the remake, the frights are such that you’re wondering why the stubborn Lutzes don’t flee after the first night. Obviously, the filmmakers were keen to remake this film exactly because the technological advances of the last 25 years now permit more graphic displays of horrific imaginings and computer enhancements that can render the invisible world visible. Strategically, the new Amityville never intended to go for the subtler, implied horror of the original; this one would be all about scaring the pants off viewers. And in this, the movie generally succeeds as sudden scares and flashes of yucky imagery cause audience members to yelp aloud as if on cue . . . The most irritating aspect of the new movie, however, has nothing to do with comparisons but rather with some of the inherent illogic of the story. Why are we seeing images of a hanged girl when we know she's been shot in the head? Images seem to be grafted into the film that have little to do with the actual story. Maybe it's a technique that succeeds within quick advertising spots, but it piles confusion onto the art of storytelling."

James Christopher of The Times observed, "There is something pleasurably batty about the way the family blunders on. The chills are satisfyingly creepy. The gory special effects are lavish and effective. And the wooden house itself is a sinister architectural pleasure. It’s total nonsense of course, but I left the lights on that night anyway."

The real George Lutz denounced the film as "drivel" and was suing the filmmakers at the time of his death in May 2006.

=== Home media ===
The film was released on DVD and UMD in separate widescreen and fullscreen editions on October 4, 2005, by Sony Pictures Home Entertainment and MGM Home Entertainment. Bonus features include commentary by Ryan Reynolds and producers Andrew Form and Brad Fuller; eight deleted scenes; On Set Peeks, a seamless branching feature with nine behind-the-scenes vignettes; Supernatural Homicide, with discussions about the murders that are the basis for the film with police and local residents; The Source of Evil, a behind-the-scenes look at the making of the film; and a photo gallery.

A VHS version was released the same day and was the final Dimension Films title ever released on VHS. Paramount Pictures (via Miramax) handles the digital distribution and select international distribution rights, including its own logo (though Warner Bros. Home Entertainment handled the home media distribution rights to the film in some countries along with the rest of MGM's post-April 1986 library from 2020 to 2026).

MGM released the film on Blu-ray for the first time on September 14, 2010. On September 3, 2024, Scream Factory released the film in a collector's edition combination set featuring both 4K UHD Blu-ray and standard Blu-ray editions.
