= The Amityville Curse (novel) =

1981 novel by Hans Holzer

The Amityille Curse
- Author: Hans Holzer
- Language: English
- Genre: Horror novel
- Publication date: 1981
- Publication place: United States
- Media type: Print (hardback & paperback)

The Amityville Curse is a 1981 horror fiction book and is a prequel to The Amityville Horror written by Hans Holzer and published in 1981. Two film adaptations also titled The Amityville Curse were both released direct-to-video in 1990 and 2023, respectively.

== Summary ==
The plot is entirely fictional, detailing how the house at 112 Ocean Ave. was once a rectory where one of the priests died, and the house subsequently becoming haunted.

== Reception ==
The book was given mixed reviews. It confused readers with why the house was haunted. This was because Holzer's 1979 book Murder in Amityville tells a different story on why the house is haunted.

== Film adaptations ==
A first film adaptation loosely based on the book, The Amityville Curse, was released direct-to-video in 1990. The second film adaptation also loosely based on the book, not a remake to the 1990 film. It was released on May 28, 2023 on Tubi.
