= Babysitter Massacre =

- DVD released by Alternative Cinema
- Directed by: Henrique Couto
- Written by: Henrique Couto
- Produced by: Matt Brassfield
- Starring: Erin R. Ryan; Haley Madison; Marylee Osbourne
- Cinematography: Henrique Couto
- Edited by: Henrique Couto
- Music by: Rick Hinkle; Buzz Amato
- Production company: New Dynamic
- Distributed by: Alternative Cinema
- Release date: April 12, 2013 (Dayton, Ohio)
- Running time: 78 minutes
- Country: United States
- Language: English

Babysitter Massacre is a 2013 horror film written and directed by Henrique Couto. Three sequels, Babysitter Massacre II: Slay Belles, Babysitter Massacre III: Overnight and Babysitter Massacre IV: Heavy Metal, were crowdfunded via Kickstarter in 2018. Because of the COVID-19 pandemic, Couto authorized a spinoff book series with author David O’Hanlon to expand the franchise until filming could resume. These currently include Babysitter Massacre: Daddy’s Little Killer, Babysitter Massacre: Family Splatters, Babysitter Massacre: Camp Carnage, and Babysitter Massacre: Murder Cove.

== Plot ==
On Halloween, a babysitter is sent several threatening text messages, the last of which reads, "I'm not in the house... yet". Moments later, the sitter is grabbed by a man in a white mask, who duct tapes her to a chair, rips three of her fingernails out, and slits her throat. Elsewhere, Angela chats with her neighbor (Mr. Walker), whose daughter April was abducted seven years ago, and has recently been deemed deceased in absentia. Angela was a member of the same babysitters club as April, and when she was taken every member of the club besides Angela blamed Bianca, who was with April when she disappeared. To try and cheer up the dour Bianca, Angela invites her to a party she is throwing. Meanwhile, out in the woods another girl is slain by the masked man. The killer then breaks into a house where he murders a couple, mutilating the girl with a straight razor before slashing her throat.

Angela and her friend Lucky prepare for the party, as the killer butchers another girl and her co-worker in an office. Bianca, who had just argued with the victim, spots the murderer (whose disguise is similar to the one worn by the person she saw take April) leaving the building and tries to follow him, but he eludes her. The maniac continues his rampage as Angela and Lucky welcome their first guest, Arlene, and Bianca angrily blows off her ex-boyfriend, Tyler. Bianca visits Angela, but storms off when Arlene taunts her with a Ouija board, afterward deciding to check on the other babysitter club members with Tyler, due to her suspicion that the masked man could be the same one who kidnapped April.

After massacring a gathering of six people, the madman breaks into Angela's house, and chloroforms her, Lucky, and Arlene. Angela and Arlene awaken in the basement, where Lucky, who has been beaten and tied to a chair, informs them that their captor told her that he will free Angela and Arlene if they kill her with a hammer. As it is their only option, Lucky tells Arlene to sacrifice her, which the sobbing Arlene reluctantly does. Bianca has Tyler drop her off at Angela's house, where she is approached by Mr. Walker, who hints that he was the one who murdered April before he knocks Bianca unconscious with a head butt.

Mr. Walker proceeds to enter the basement, strangle Arlene, and unmask himself for Angela. Mr. Walker takes Angela upstairs, incapacitates her by cutting her ankles, and rants about how much he loves her; he murdered all of the others in order to free her from her old life, so that she could start a new one with him, asserting, "You will come to love me, in time". While Mr. Walker pours gasoline throughout the kitchen, Angela stabs him in the stomach, with Mr. Walker doing the same to her. Angela begins crawling away while Mr. Walker takes out a lighter, proclaiming, "The only thing more romantic than running away together, is dying together. Love is a bitch!" The disoriented Bianca enters, but is told to run by Angela, who reassures her by saying, "It's not your fault". The house erupts up in flames, and Bianca goes into hysterics as Tyler tries to console her, and emergency services approach.

== Cast ==
- Erin R. Ryan as Angela
- Marylee Osborne as Bianca
- Joni Durian as Lucky
- Tara Clark as Arlene
- Odette Despairr as Linda
- Serendipity Lynch as Sandy
- Geoff Burkman as Mr. Walker
- Stephanie Coffey as Allison
- Chandra McCracken as Tina
- David Denoyer as Tony
- Amy Taint as Cindy
- Haley Madison as Cassandra
- Mike Canestaro as John
- Stephanie Michael as Britney
- Marshall Norman as Tyler Petrino
- Rachel Kathryn Ritter as Erica
- Bradley Diehl as David
- Alicia Lozier as Melanie

== Reception ==
Gordon Sullivan of DVD Verdict responded well to the film, and transcribed his closing thoughts regarding it with, "Many fans of low-budget films look for the diamond in the rough, that one film that will make up for the dozen or so terrible films that have to be endured until a gem appears. Babysitter Massacre is one of those gems. It's made by people who love the genre and have the skills to craft a low-budget homage that gets it right. It's not going to change anyone's life, but those who remember sorority slasher films fondly will appreciate Babysitter Massacre. Similarly, Film Threat's Mike Watt wrote, "A direct homage to the tireless subgenre of '80s slashers, particularly Sorority House Massacre 2 which is name-checked in the dialogue, Babysitter Massacre offers up all you need to know in its title and really delivers to the intended audience". In a review of the film for Rock! Shock! Pop!, Ian Jane stated, "Right in the opening scene we get a curvy cutie out of her clothes and into the bath before taking her out... and we're off and running from there. Nudity is plentiful and wanton and the gore scenes are nasty enough to work. The movie shifts from fairly playful to decidedly malicious in the last twenty minutes, and the fairly drastic change in tone might take some by surprise but that's how it goes regardless. The acting is fairly average for a low budget movie, though Marylee Osborne manages to show some range taking a stereotypical tough girl character and giving her a bit of believable emotion. The rest of the characters are fairly standard, though not unlikeable. Ultimately there isn't a whole lot of suspense here and as a horror movie, this isn't going to blow you away. As a leering, trashy exploitation film with some random moments of humor contrasting in strange ways with the more serious murder set pieces, however, it's interesting and entertaining enough".
