= The Beast Beneath =

2020 television film

- Written by: Dustin Ferguson
- Directed by: Dustin Ferguson
- Starring: Mel Novak; Brinke Stevens; Shawn C. Phillips; Sheri Davis; Jennifer Nangle
- Original language: English

Production
- Producers: Joseph Kelbie Williamson; Dustin Ferguson; Saul Mejia
- Cinematography: Dustin Ferguson
- Editor: Dustin Ferguson
- Running time: 70 mins
- Production company: SCS Entertainment

Original release
- Network: WGUD-TV
- Release: August 7, 2020

The Beast Beneath is a 2020 American made-for-television horror film written and directed by Dustin Ferguson, starring Mel Novak and Brinke Stevens. It premiered on After Hours Cinema on WGUD-TV August 7, 2020.

== Synopsis ==
A prehistoric creature begins to attack a local, resort town community after it is awoken by an earthquake. Scientist Charlene and her brother Aaron have to work together to understand what the monster is and try to stop it's rampage, while working against the local mayor who is attempting to cover up the deaths and prevent a drop in tourism.

== Cast ==
- Mel Novak as Mayor George Reid
- Brinke Stevens as Charlene Brinkeman
- Shawn C. Phillips as Jake
- Jennifer Nangle as Sally
- Sheri Davis as Cheryl
- Mike Ferguson as Tom Lee
- Lee Turner as Lieutenant Turner
- Eric Prochnau as Aaron
