= Murder in Amityville =

1979 novel by Hans Holzer

- Author: Hans Holzer
- Language: English
- Genre: Horror novel
- Publisher: Belmont Tower Books
- Publication date: 1979
- Publication place: United States
- Pages: 288

Murder In Amityville is a non-fiction book written by Hans Holzer and first published in 1979 which serves as a prequel to the 1977 novel The Amityville Horror. It has since been re-released as part of a trilogy under the title Amityville: Fact or Fiction?.

== Plot summary ==
The plot tries to explain why Ronald Defeo Jr. killed his family at 112 Ocean Ave. It revolves around Ronald Jr. as he experiences strange events in the house up until he shoots his entire family dead on November 13, 1974. It goes on to claim that he was possessed by "evil forces" and that he did not want to kill his family. It introduces controversial events. It is also based on Defeo's explanation of why he says he killed his family.

== Adaptations ==
The book was loosely used as the basis for the 1982 horror film Amityville II: The Possession. Holzer's theory that DeFeo was possessed is also used in 2005's The Amityville Horror and 2018's The Amityville Murders. A television special was filmed in 1979 with Holzer narrating and including interviews with DeFeo and medium Ethel Johnson-Meyers, but eventually was scrapped and never made public.
