= Dustin Ferguson =

American filmmaker

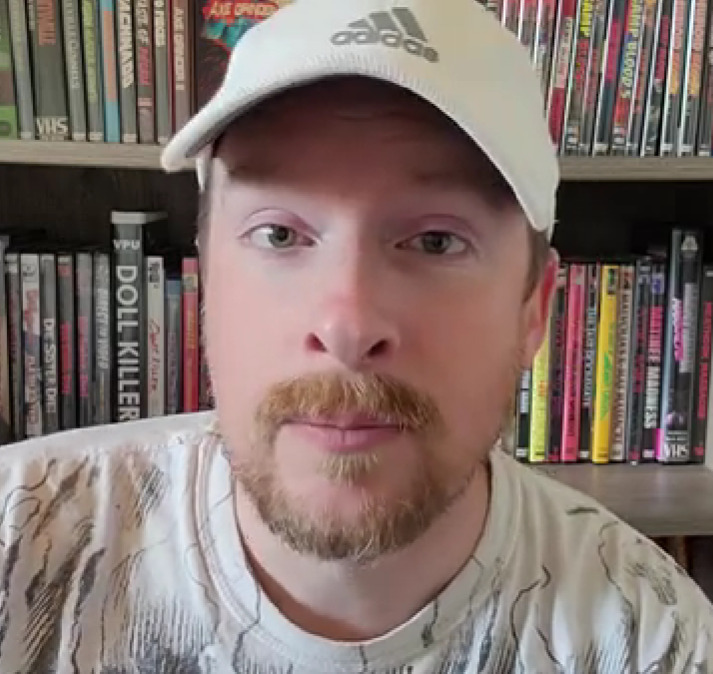
- Ferguson in 2021
- Born: United States
- Occupations: Film director, producer, screenwriter, editor
- Notable work: The Amityville Legacy

Dustin Ferguson is an American filmmaker from Murrieta, California. He has directed numerous music videos and more than 150 horror films since 2007, including The Amityville Legacy and Spider Baby, or The Maddest Story Ever Told.

Ferguson writes, directs and edits his own films and is known for his prolific output, releasing several feature films each year as well as for making mockbusters and sequels.

== Filmmaking career ==
Ferguson originally wanted to open up his own video rental shop, but by the time he graduated from college this had become a thing of the past and was no longer a viable business option. He decided to become a filmmaker instead (although he did briefly open a Video Store in 2017). He started making short films in his father's backyard, inspired by horror filmmakers from the 1970s and 1980s like Wes Craven and Tobe Hooper. His first theatrical release was Terror at Black Tree Forest. He continued to make films, releasing as many as sixteen in one year. His films focus on long takes and suspenseful editing and he tries to avoid complicated special effects. Focusing almost exclusively on low-budget horror films, he has been compared to the early pioneers of the genre such as Roger Corman and he was dubbed Roger Corman's sequel by the website Horror News.

Ferguson's film, The Amityville Legacy, ranked #11 of 1428 Elm's the 15 greatest Amityville movies of all time. He has directed Brinke Stevens in over 20 films, including: Die Sister, Die! (2013), House of Pain (2018), Horndogs Beach Party (2018), and RoboWoman (2019). His film, Die Sister, Die! (2013) ranked #10 of Gruemonkey's Top 10 best Brinke Stevens films out of over 188 of her films.

Within the horror genre, his portfolio has been noted for running the gamut from very serious and shocking content to deliberately over the top comedy films. Critics have variously compared Ferguson's works to exploitation classics such as Mondo Cane, A Lizard in a Woman's Skin and Cannibal Holocaust.

== Filmography ==
- Terror at Black Tree Forest (2010)
- The Legacy of Boggy Creek (2011)
- Silly Scaries (2011)
- Escape to Black Tree Forest (2012)
- Silly Scaries 2 (2012)
- Slumber Party Slasherthon (2012)
- Black Tree Forest III (2012)
- Die Sister, Die! (2013)
- Doll Killer (2013)
- Gloved Murderess (2014)
- Occult Holocaust (2014)
- Cheerleader Camp: To the Death (2014)
- Invitation to Die (2015)
- Silent Night, Bloody Night 2: Revival (2015)
- Demon Dolls (2015)
- Shockumentary (2015)
- Meathook Massacre (2015)
- Blood Claws (2016)
- Camp Blood 4 (2016)
- Camp Blood 5 (2016)
- The Amityville Legacy (2016)
- Tales for the Campfire (2016)
- Night of the Clown (2016)
- The Dummy 2 (2016)
- The 12 Slays of Christmas (2016)
- Tales for the Campfire 2 (2017)
- Meathook Massacre II (2017)
- Penny Pinchers: The Kings of No-Budget Horror (2017)
- Oh! The Horror! (2017)
- Wrong Side of the Tracks (2017)
- Nemesis 5: The New Model (2017)
- Amityville: Evil Never Dies (2017)
- Trashsploitation (2018)
- 2 Die For (2018)
- Horndogs Beach Party (2018)
- House of Pain (2018)
- Conjuring Curse (2018)
- Runaway Nightmare (2018)
- Conspiracy X (2018)
- RoboWoman (2019)
- Dawna of the Darkness Presents: The Dustin Ferguson Story (2019)
- Moon of the Blood Beast (2019)
- The Beast Beneath (2020)
- Tales from the Campfire 3 (2020)
- Ebola Rex (2020)
- 5G Zombies (2020)
- Frames of Fear 3 (2020)
- Apex Predators (2021)
- Ebola Rex Versus Murder Hornets (2021)
- Beyond The Gates of Hell (2023)
- Apex Predators 2 (2023)
- Cocaine Cougar (2023)
- Spider Baby, or The Maddest Story Ever Told (2024)
- Space Sharks (2024)
- Big Bad CGI Monsters (2024)
- Apex Predators 2: The Spawning (2024)
- House on Haunted Hill (2024)
- Return to the Dark House of Mystery (2024)
- Lifeform (2025)
- Witchcraft 17 (2025)
- Sharks N Da Hood (2025)
- Deep Water (2026)
- Rebirth of the Living Dead (2026)
- Midnight 3 (2026)
