= Jason Williams (actor) =

American actor and writer

- Born: Columbia, Maryland
- Occupations: Television, film, stage actor, writer, director
- Spouse: Charlotte Cohn
- Website: jasonodellwilliams.com

Jason Odell Williams is an American actor and writer. He is from Columbia, Maryland. Jason received his BA from the University of Virginia and his MFA from the Actors Studio Drama School in New York City. Jason currently lives in Manhattan with his wife, actress and singer Charlotte Cohn, and their daughter, Imogen.

== Works ==
Jason Odell Williams is an Emmy® Award nominated writer and producer. His play Handle With Care opened Off-Broadway at The Westside Theatre on Dec. 15, 2013 starring Broadway legend Carol Lawrence, directed by Karen Carpenter, and was a New York Times Critics’ Pick.

Handle With Care has also been produced at The Kitchen Theatre, Gulfshore Playhouse, JCC Centerstage, The Minnesota Jewish Theatre Co., Theatre Jacksonville, Actors’ Summit, Teatron Toronto, and was recently optioned for a film.

His other plays have been produced at the DR2 (starring Vincent Piazza and Anatol Yusef from HBO's Boardwalk Empire), the cell, Fells Point Corner Theatre and The American Globe Theatre. His work has been developed at Primary Stages, The Lark, The Blank, NJ Rep, Theatre Raleigh, Midtown Direct Rep and The Hudson Valley Writers’ Workshop where he won first prize in the 2012 New Play Competition. Previous readings and workshops have starred Tony winner Norbert Leo Butz, Tony nominee Tovah Feldshuh, and film and TV star Matthew Lillard.

Williams is currently a writer and producer of the National Geographic Channel's hit TV series Brain Games. His first novel, Personal Statement, published by In This Together Media in August 2013, was optioned for a three-picture deal, and books two and three in the series are in development.

Williams lives in Manhattan with his wife, Charlotte Cohn, and their daughter, Imogen.

== Plays ==
- Church & State, a play about gun control, premiered in Los Angeles in 2016, and opened in New York in 2018.
