= Sandor Stern =

Canadian writer, director and film producer

- Born: July 13, 1936 (age 90); Timmins, Ontario, Canada
- Occupations: Writer, director, producer
- Spouse: divorced
- Children: 4

Sandor Stern (born July 13, 1936) is a Canadian writer, director and film producer best known for his horror films.

== Personal life ==
Born in the northern Canadian town of Timmins, Ontario; raised in the small town of Prescott, Ontario, on the St. Lawrence River; Sandor Stern was drawn to short story writing while in high school and began writing stage plays while attending the University of Toronto. Though he planned to obtain a degree in teaching, a physician-uncle suggested that medicine might offer more involving experiences for an aspiring writer. Heeding that advice, Stern enrolled in Medical School at the University of Toronto. During his schooling, he continued to write, switching to TV scripts, and selling his first script to the Canadian Broadcasting Corporation prior to his graduation in 1961. Three of his four sons formed the successful Los Angeles hardcore punk band Youth Brigade, and its almost 30-year-old record label Better Youth Organization.

== Career ==
Setting up a private practice in Toronto, Stern continued to write; adding songwriting and variety sketch writing to his credits. Over the next five years, he wrote numerous shows for the CBC until demand for his work allowed him to give up the practice of medicine and devote full time to writing. He wrote the CTV network's first drama Rumble of Silence (1968) and created the CBC network's medical series Corwin (1969). Deciding to try his luck in Hollywood, Stern arrived in LA and immediately landed an assignment to write an episode of NBC's The Bold Ones. He quickly moved on to other episodic dramas such as Ironside (1969) and onto producing with The Mod Squad (1971) and Doc Elliot (1973). His TV movie producing began in 1974 with The Strange and Deadly Occurrence. In 1979, The Seeding of Sarah Burns was his first directing assignment, and in 1982 he directed and wrote the teleplay for the CBS made-for-television film, Muggable Mary, Street Cop. He also created the short-lived 1983 CBS TV series Cutter to Houston. Since then he has written and/or directed more than 35 movies, including the screenplays for three feature films: The Amityville Horror (1979), Fast Break (1979) (winner of the 1979 NAACP Image Award for best screenplay) and Pin (which he also directed). Stern was divorced from wife, Marlene, in 1975 and from wife, Kandy, in 2018. He is presently single. His recent credits include co-writing the Lifetime cable movie You Belong To Me (2007) His first novel, The Life and Adventures of Ralph, The Cat was published in 2008. His short story, "My Grandfather Clock" was published in the anthology, "Canadian Voices" in 2009. His anthology of short stories, "The Karma Chronicles" was published in 2010. In 2023 he published the novel "Material Witness".
