= Henrique Couto =

American film director

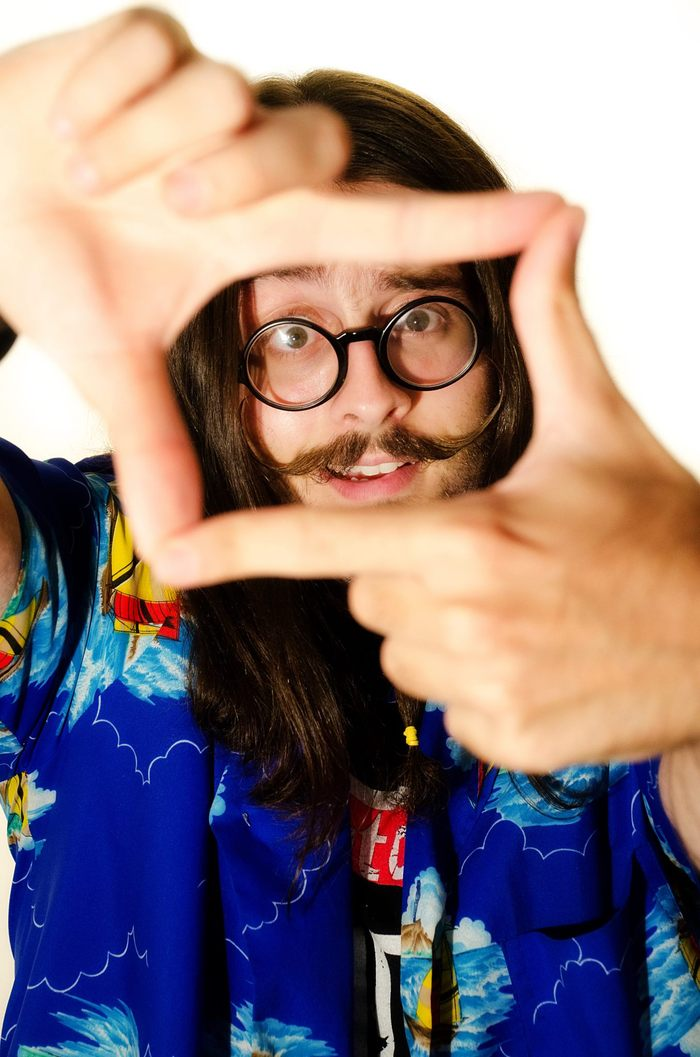
- Born: September 10, 1986 (age 38); Dayton, Ohio, United States
- Occupation(s): Director, producer, screenwriter, musician, actor
- Years active: 2001–present

Henrique Couto (born September 10, 1986) is an American writer and film director from Dayton, Ohio, United States of Portuguese descent. He is best known for directing the Babysitter Massacre.

== Feature films ==
His first feature film was Marty Jenkins and the Vampire Bitches (2005), which began a career of nearly 20 more films as director and many more as producer. His first feature film to gain national distribution was Faces of Schlock (2009). One of his most known horror films is Babysitter Massacre, which was praised for the intense character pathos contained within a traditional exploitation genre movie and was the last independent DVD to be on the shelves of Blockbuster Video.

From there Couto directed and produced films in multiple genres such as comedy, western, family, and more while developing a devoted fanbase.

== Television ==
In 2019 the TV series Boggy Creek: The Series was released on Prime Video and various syndicated outlets. The series was Produced and Directed by Couto and Executive Produced by film making legend Fred Olen Ray and featured adventures revolving around the Fouke Monster. Stars of the show included Brinke Stevens and Eric Roberts

The same year Couto would step in front of the camera to host cult movie show Popcorn Fodder which was featured on Prime Video and streaming service Screambox.

== Podcasting ==
In 2019 the horror fiction podcast Weekly Spooky was launched featuring a new story every Wednesday narrated by Couto and featuring talented authors from all over the world as of October 2021 there are over 100 episodes.
