= Amityville murders =

1974 familicide in New York, US

Coordinates: 40°39′59.7″N 73°24′53.5″W

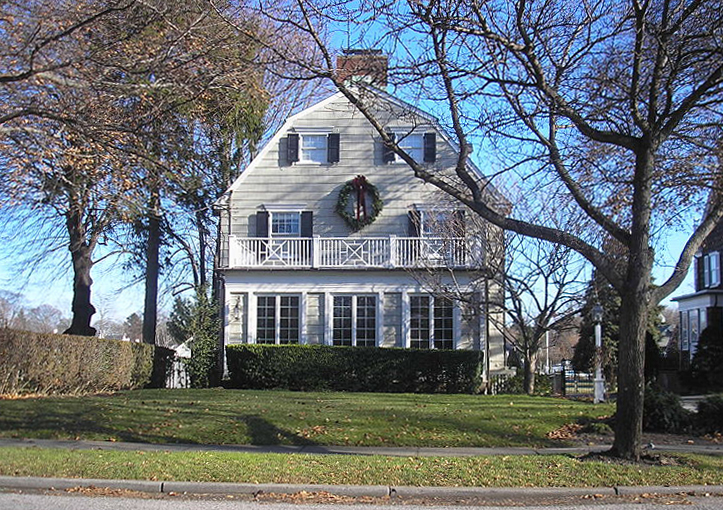
- The DeFeo home on 112 Ocean Avenue, Amityville
- Location: Amityville, New York, US
- Date: November 13, 1974; 52 years ago
- Weapon: .35 Marlin rifle
- Deaths: 6
- Victim: DeFeo family
- Perpetrator: Ronald DeFeo Jr.
- Motive: Unclear

On November 13, 1974, six members of the DeFeo (/dəˈfeɪoʊ/) family were murdered in their home in Amityville, New York, United States. The sole surviving family member, 23-year-old Ronald DeFeo Jr., first claimed that his family was targeted in a contract killing by the American Mafia before confessing that he had committed the murders. DeFeo was found guilty of six counts of second-degree murder and was sentenced to 25 years to life. The case inspired the book and film versions of The Amityville Horror, based on supposed paranormal phenomena occurring in the house more than a year after the murders.

== Murders ==
Around 6:30 p.m. on November 13, 1974, Ronald DeFeo entered Henry's Bar in Amityville, Long Island, New York, and declared: "You got to help me! I think my mother and father are shot!" DeFeo and a small group of people went to 112 Ocean Avenue, which was located near the bar, and found that DeFeo's parents were dead inside the house. One of the group, DeFeo's friend Joe Yeswit, made an emergency call to the Amityville Police Department, who searched the house and found that six members of the family were dead in their beds.

=== Victims ===
The victims were Ronald Jr.'s parents, Ronald DeFeo Sr., 43, and Louise DeFeo (née Brigante), also 43, and his four siblings, Dawn, 18; Allison, 13; Marc, 12; and John, 9. All of the victims had been shot with a .35 caliber lever action Marlin 336C rifle around 3:00 a.m. that day. The children had been killed by single shots, while the parents had each been shot twice. Physical evidence suggests that Louise DeFeo and her daughter Allison were awake at the time of their deaths. According to Suffolk County Police, all the victims were found lying face down in bed. The DeFeo family had occupied 112 Ocean Avenue since purchasing the house in 1965. The six victims were later buried in Saint Charles Cemetery nearby in Farmingdale.

== Perpetrator ==
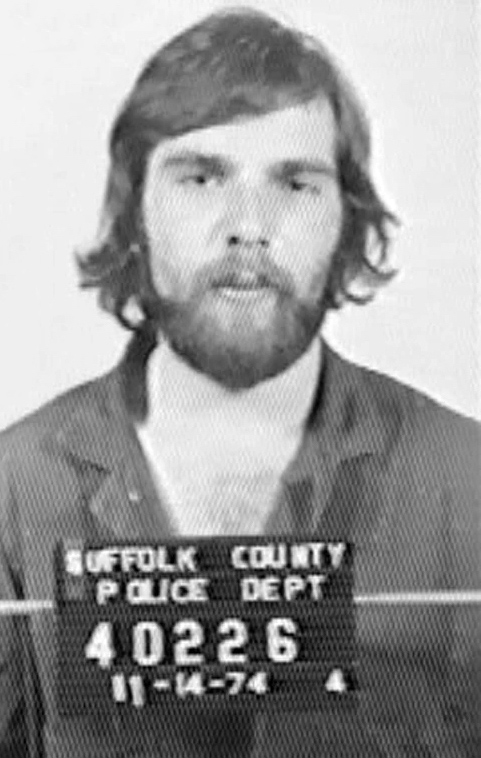
DeFeo's mug shot, taken a day after the murders

Ronald Joseph DeFeo Jr. (September 26, 1951 – March 12, 2021), also known as "Butch", was born in Brooklyn, New York. He was the eldest child of the family and its lone surviving member. He was taken to the local police station for his own protection after suggesting to police officers at the scene of the crime that the killings had been carried out by Louis Falini, whom he described as a mob hitman.

However, an interview at the station exposed serious inconsistencies in his version of events. The following day, he confessed to carrying out the killings himself; Falini, the alleged hitman, had an alibi proving that he was out of state at the time of the killings. DeFeo told detectives: "Once I started, I just couldn't stop. It went so fast." He admitted that he had taken a bath and changed his clothes, and detailed where he had discarded crucial evidence such as blood-stained clothes, the Marlin rifle, and cartridges, before going to work as usual.

== Trial and conviction ==
DeFeo's trial began on October 14, 1975. He and his defense lawyer, William Weber, mounted an affirmative defense of insanity, with DeFeo claiming that he had no memory of killing his family. The insanity plea was supported by the psychiatrist for the defense, Daniel Schwartz. The psychiatrist for the prosecution, Dr. Harold Zolan, maintained that, although DeFeo was a user of heroin and LSD, he had anti-social personality disorder and was aware of his actions at the time of the crime.

On November 21, 1975, DeFeo was found guilty on six counts of second-degree murder. On December 4, 1975, Judge Stark sentenced DeFeo to six sentences of 25 years to life.

DeFeo was held at the Sullivan Correctional Facility in the town of Fallsburg, New York, until his death in 2021, with all of his appeals and requests to the parole board being denied.

== Motive and method ==
All six of the victims were found face down in their beds with no signs of a struggle. The police investigation concluded that the rifle had not been fitted with a sound suppressor and found no evidence of sedatives having been administered. DeFeo claimed during his interrogation that he had drugged his family.

DeFeo had a volatile relationship with his father, but the motive for the killings remains unclear. He asked police what he had to do to collect on his father's life insurance, which prompted the prosecution to suggest at trial that his motive was to collect on the life insurance policies of his parents.

After his conviction, DeFeo gave varying accounts of how the killings were carried out. In a 1986 interview for Newsday, DeFeo claimed his sister Dawn killed their father and then their distraught mother killed all of his siblings, apparently with a rifle, before he killed his mother. He stated that he took the blame because he was afraid to say anything negative about his mother to her father, Michael Brigante Sr., and his father's uncle, out of fear that they would kill him. His father's uncle was Peter DeFeo, a caporegime in the Genovese crime family. In this interview, DeFeo also asserted he was married at the time of the murders to a woman named Geraldine Gates, with whom he was living in New Jersey, and that his mother phoned to ask him to return to Amityville to break up a fight between Dawn and their father. Subsequently, he drove to Amityville with Geraldine's brother, Richard Romondoe, who was with him at the time of the murders and could verify his entire story.

In 1990, DeFeo filed a 440 motion, a proceeding to have his conviction vacated. In support of his motion, DeFeo asserted that Dawn and an unknown assailant, who fled the house before he could get a good look at him, killed their parents and Dawn subsequently killed their siblings. He said the only person he killed was Dawn and that it was by accident as they struggled over the rifle. Again, he asserted he was married to Geraldine and that her brother was with him at the time of the murders. An affidavit from Richard Romondoe was submitted to the court, and it was asserted that he could not be located to testify in person. Evidence was submitted to the court by the Suffolk County District Attorney's Office suggesting that Richard Romondoe did not exist and that Geraldine Gates was living in upstate New York married to someone else at the time of the murders. Geraldine Gates did not testify at this hearing, because the authorities had already confronted her about the false claims; in 1992, they had secured a statement under oath in which she admitted that Romondoe was fictitious, and that she did not actually marry DeFeo until 1989 in anticipation of the filing of the 440 motion.

Judge Stark denied the motion, writing, "I find the testimony of the defendant overall to be false and fabricated. His testimony that during the fall of 1974 he was married and lived with his wife and child at Long Branch, New Jersey is incredible and not worthy of belief. He produced no corroborating evidence in this regard." Stark further declared, "Defendant's testimony that he did not shoot and kill the members of his family is likewise incredible and not worthy of belief."

On November 30, 2000, DeFeo met with Ric Osuna, the author of The Night the DeFeos Died, which was published in 2002. According to Osuna, they spoke for about six hours. However, in a letter to the radio show host Lou Gentile, DeFeo denied giving Ric Osuna information that could be used in his book, claiming that he immediately left the interview and did not speak to Osuna about anything substantive.

According to Osuna, DeFeo claimed that he had committed the murders with his sister Dawn and two friends, Augie Degenero and Bobby Kelske, "out of desperation," because his parents had plotted to kill him. Allegedly, DeFeo claimed that, after a furious row with his father, he and his sister planned to kill their parents and that Dawn murdered the children to eliminate them as witnesses. He said that he was enraged on discovering his sister's actions, knocked her unconscious onto her bed, and shot her in the head. Police found traces of unburned gunpowder on Dawn's nightgown, which DeFeo proponents allege proves she discharged a firearm. However, at trial, the ballistics expert, Alfred Della Penna, testified that unburned gunpowder is discharged through the muzzle of a weapon, indicating that she was in proximity to the muzzle of the weapon when it was discharged and not that she fired the weapon. He reiterated this on the 2006 A&E Amityville documentary First Person Killers: Ronald DeFeo. This interview is extensively discussed in Will Savive's Mentally Ill In Amityville. Savive had an expert evaluate Della Penna's assessment and the expert confirmed that he was correct. Moreover, the medical examiner found nothing to indicate that Dawn had been in a struggle; the bullet wound was the only fresh mark on her body.

Skeptic Joe Nickell noted in 2003 that, given the frequency with which DeFeo had changed his story over the years, any further claims from him regarding the events that took place on the night of the murders should be approached with caution.

Most of the claims made in Ric Osuna's book are sourced to DeFeo's ex-wife, Geraldine Gates. While in the 1986 interview with Newsday, she asserted she married DeFeo in 1974, in Osuna's book, she alleges they married in 1970. Their 1993 divorce case says that they met in 1985, married in 1989, and divorced in 1993.

Ronald DeFeo died aged 69 on March 12, 2021, at the Albany Medical Center. The official cause of death has not been released to the public.

== In popular culture ==
Jay Anson's book The Amityville Horror was published on September 13, 1977. The book is based on the 28-day period during December 1975 and January 1976 when George and Kathy Lutz and their three children became the first family to live at 112 Ocean Avenue since the murders. The Lutz family left the house, claiming that they had been terrorized by paranormal phenomena while living there. The book's 1979 film adaptation became the highest-grossing independent film of all time and held that record until 1990. It was followed by several sequels, as well as many other films which share no connection other than the reference to Amityville.
