= Jay Anson =

American author

- Born: November 4, 1921; New York City, U.S.
- Died: March 12, 1980 (aged 58); Palo Alto, California, U.S.
- Occupations: Writer, author
- Writing career
- Notable work: The Amityville Horror

Jay Anson (November 4, 1921 – March 12, 1980) was an American author whose most famous work was The Amityville Horror. After the runaway success of that novel, he wrote 666, which also dealt with a haunted house. He died in 1980.

His work, The Amityville Horror, was sold as "a true story", and it was based on the reported experiences of George Lutz and Kathleen Lutz at 112 Ocean Avenue in December 1975. The Lutzes had sold the rights to the book to Anson, who had added to and adapted some of the Lutz's original claims. A film was later made of the book in 1979, which exemplified these additions. Anson died a year later.
