= Amityville II: The Possession =

1982 film by Damiano Damiani

- Theatrical release poster
- Directed by: Damiano Damiani
- Screenplay by: Tommy Lee Wallace; Dardano Sacchetti
- Based on: Murder in Amityville by Hans Holzer
- Produced by: Ira N. Smith; Stephen R. Greenwald; José López Rodero
- Starring: James Olson; Burt Young; Rutanya Alda; Jack Magner; Diane Franklin; Moses Gunn
- Cinematography: Franco Di Giacomo
- Edited by: Sam O'Steen
- Music by: Lalo Schifrin
- Production companies: Dino De Laurentiis Corporation-Giada International; Estudios Churubusco
- Distributed by: Orion Pictures (United States)
- Release date: September 24, 1982 (U.S.)
- Running time: 104 minutes
- Countries: Mexico; United States
- Budget: $5 million
- Box office: US$12.5 million

Amityville II: The Possession is a 1982 supernatural horror film directed by Damiano Damiani and starring James Olson, Burt Young, Rutanya Alda, Jack Magner, and Diane Franklin. It is an international co-production between Mexico and the United States. The screenplay by Tommy Lee Wallace and Dardano Sacchetti is based on the novel Murder in Amityville by the parapsychologist Hans Holzer. It is the second film in the Amityville Horror film series and a loose prequel to The Amityville Horror (1979), set at 112 Ocean Avenue and featuring the fictional Montelli family, loosely based on the DeFeo family. It follows the Montelli family's decline under apparent demonic forces present in their home.

Principal photography took place at the same Toms River, New Jersey residence featured in the first film, while interiors were shot exclusively on soundstages at Estudios Churubusco in Mexico City. After test screenings were completed, Damiani's original cut of the film was slightly truncated to tone down its overt incestuous sexuality and a rape sequence, which audiences responded to unfavorably.

Released by Orion Pictures in the fall of 1982, Amityville II: The Possession received unfavorable reviews from critics, though some, such as Roger Ebert, felt it was superior to its predecessor, an opinion that has been echoed by contemporary reviewers.

== Plot ==
The Montellis, an Italian American family headed by Anthony Montelli and his wife, Dolores, move into 112 Ocean Avenue in Amityville, New York, with their 4 children, Sonny, Patricia, Mark, and Jan.

An evil presence is shown to be lurking within the house, unknown to the family. Unusual and paranormal activities occur, such as unknown forces banging on the door at night when no one is outside, and an ugly demonic message painted on the wall of Jan's room. For the latter, Anthony blames and beats his children, Jan and Mark, then beats Dolores for intervening, resulting in a fight between the entire family. Concerned by these developments, Dolores tries to have the local Catholic priest, Father Frank Adamsky, bless the house. However, an argument breaks out in the family shortly after another demonic incident causes significant damage to the kitchen. Anthony blames the younger children again and hits Jan as Adamsky tries to intervene, but Anthony rudely orders him to leave. To Dolores' mortification, Adamsky leaves, disgusted at Anthony's behavior. He finds his car door open and the Liturgy of the Hours on the passenger seat torn to pieces. The situation inside the home continues to deteriorate; Anthony is shown to be strict, abusive, sacrilegious towards the Catholic faith, violent towards his family, and forcing his wife to have sex with him against her will. Dolores tries to keep things together for the youngest children.

The family goes to church with Anthony so he can apologize for being rude to Adamsky, but he only agrees after Dolores threatens to divorce him. Sonny stays at home, claiming to feel unwell. He soon hears an alarming noise and goes downstairs to get his father's gun. He hears demonic laughter and follows it to a tunnel in the basement. The unseen presence pursues a frightened Sonny to his room, and he then falls victim to demonic possession. Now possessed, Sonny approaches Patricia to play a game with him. They pretend he is a famous photographer and she is his nude model. Patricia agrees to pose naked, and the pair end up having incestuous sex. Patricia is then seen at confession, partially confessing to the act and telling Adamsky that he does it to "hurt God," but not revealing that it was her brother she slept with.

Sonny becomes more sinister and demonic as his face starts contorting demonically. Startled, he tries to keep his family away but is unsuccessful due to the demon's influence. On Sonny's birthday, he isolates himself from the party, but Patricia goes to check on him. She tells him she does not feel guilty about what they have been doing, but due to his demonic phases and his body's gradual demonic contortions, Sonny sends her away, using foul language. Patricia runs away crying and tries to tell Adamsky that she thinks Sonny is possessed, but he does not respond. Later that night, the evil spirit tells Sonny to "kill them all." Sonny, now fully possessed, goes and gets Anthony's rifle and kills him, Dolores, Jan, Mark, and finally Patricia, after hunting her down.

The next day, the police arrive, pick up the bodies, and Sonny is arrested. Sonny tells Adamsky at the scene that he does not recall killing his family. Adamsky then realizes that Sonny is possessed and asks the bishops if he can perform an exorcism on him, but they refuse, not believing him. He then decides to perform an exorcism without the support of the Catholic Church. After freeing him from police custody, Adamsky takes Sonny to church. Sonny attacks him and escapes after seeing the crosses on the doors. Adamsky runs after Sonny, traces him to the house, and performs the exorcism, releasing Sonny's soul. As the police arrive, Adamsky asks Father Tom to take Sonny away from him. Tom takes Sonny outside, where the police arrest him and take him back into custody. It is revealed that the demon has entered Adamsky. Father Adamsky's fate, he was never seen or heard from again, and the house is eventually put up for sale, destined to be purchased by the Lutz family.

== Cast ==
- James Olson as Father Frank Adamsky
- Burt Young as Anthony Montelli
- Rutanya Alda as Dolores Montelli
- Jack Magner as Sonny Montelli
- Diane Franklin as Patricia Montelli
- Brent Katz as Mark Montelli
- Erika Katz as Jan Montelli
- Andrew Prine as Father Tom
- Leonardo Cimino as Chancellor
- Moses Gunn as Detective Burt Turner
- Ted Ross as Mr. Booth
- Petra Lea as Mrs. Greer
- Martin Donegan as Detective Cortez

== Production ==
=== Development ===
The film was an international co-production film between Mexico and the United States. George Lutz wanted the sequel to the 1979 film The Amityville Horror to be based on the book The Amityville Horror Part II by John G. Jones, but the producer Dino De Laurentiis secured a deal with American International Pictures for a sequel based on Murder in Amityville by Hans Holzer. Lutz sued De Laurentiis and ultimately lost, but succeeded in having posters placed in theaters stating "This film has no affiliation with George and Kathy Lutz." The film was later acquired by Filmways, which in turn was acquired by Orion Pictures shortly before release.

=== Filming ===
Production was originally set to begin in September 1981 with a screenplay by David Ambrose and under the direction of John Hough. However, production was pushed back and they were both replaced. Principal photography began March 8, 1982 at the same residence in Toms River, New Jersey that the previous film used. After two weeks on location in New Jersey, studio shooting was completed in Mexico City for eight or nine weeks at Estudios Churubusco Azteca S.A.

=== Post-production ===
After director Damiano Damiani's original cut of the film was shown to test audiences, several scenes had to be cut out for various reasons, one of them being the negative reaction of the audience to a scene in which Anthony Montelli (Burt Young) anally rapes Dolores (Rutanya Alda) and another scene in which Sonny (Jack Magner) and Patricia (Diane Franklin) have incestuous sex. This scene was added into the script by Damiani who wanted to really upset the viewers. The original scene was much more graphic and sexual, while in the movie it cuts to the next scene almost immediately after Sonny starts kissing Patricia. Some other deleted scenes were shown on lobby cards and stills for the movie, such as a scene in which Anthony is sitting outside the house drinking and cleaning a gun and a scene where Jan (Erica Katz) is pushing Mark (Brent Katz)'s head under the water while he is in the bathtub. The theatrical trailer also shows a shot of Jan and Mark looking at the window and holding hands. The only deleted scene which was ever released in some form is the so-called "Lost Souls" scene, originally from near the end of the movie, in which souls that are within the house appear in front of Father Frank Adamsky (James Olson) and he blesses them. No actual footage was released but a UK special collector's edition DVD includes several stills from this deleted scene.

== Release ==
=== Box office ===
Amityville II: The Possession was distributed theatrically in the United States by Orion Pictures on September 24, 1982. It earned $4,104,277 during its opening weekend, and grossed a total of $12,534,817 over the course of its initial theatrical run.

=== Critical response ===
The film received marginally favorable reviews at the time of its release. As of October 2024, internet review aggregator website Rotten Tomatoes gives the film an approval rating of 27%, based on 22 reviews, with an average rating of 4.3/10.

Dann Gire of the Chicago Daily Herald thought the film used excessive effects, and found the storyline not as interesting as what it could have been. Roger Ebert of the Chicago Sun-Times, who gave the first film a negative review, claimed the film "is actually slightly better than The Amityville Horror" and mentioned some good technical credits and performances and gave the film 2 out of 4 stars. Both he and Gene Siskel selected the film as one of the worst of the year in a 1982 episode of Sneak Previews. Variety complained that there are "actually two films meandering in this mess — one a second rate horror flick about a family in peril, and another that is a slight variation on the demon-possessed Exorcist theme." Likewise, Boxoffice called this attempt to cash-in on the success of The Amityville Horror an "embarrassment."

Richard F. Shepard of The New York Times noted that there is "some reasonably competent acting here, but it has a supporting role next to the stars, which are the camera and the special effects department. The director, Damiano Damiani, conjures up the malevolent spirit of the house in shots that show the camera creeping up on people and in scenes of things crashing about in the house." Kevin Thomas of the Los Angeles Times gave the film a marginally favorable review, writing that it "stands quite sturdily on its own... Rather than seeming derivative, Amityville II: The Possession seems to incorporate motifs from everything from The Exorcist to Poltergeist in an original and unexpectedly spiritual way. Damiano Damiani has exceeded in his bravura."

==== Accolades ====
Rutanya Alda was nominated for a Golden Raspberry Award for Worst Supporting Actress for this film at the 3rd Golden Raspberry Awards, her second consecutive after the previous years' nod for Mommie Dearest in the same category.

==== Contemporary opinion ====
Writing for Bloody Disgusting, Meagan Navarro argued in a 2017 editorial that Amityville II: The Possession is a superior film to its 1979 predecessor, featuring better pacing and special effects, a sentiment similarly stated by Roger Ebert at the time of the film's original release.

=== Home media ===
Embassy Home Entertainment released Amityville II: The Possession on VHS in 1983. MGM Home Entertainment released the film on DVD on April 5, 2005.

Scream Factory released the film on Blu-ray in 2013, as part of The Amityville Trilogy set, which also included The Amityville Horror (1979) and Amityville 3-D (1983).

== Related works ==
A follow-up film titled Amityville 3-D (1983) was released the following year, loosely based on the accounts of paranormal investigator Stephen Kaplan, who was trying to prove the Lutz family's story was a hoax. The film has little to no connection to this film, or even the first film, as it doesn't reference the Montelli family at all, and instead makes reference to the actual DeFeo family.

== Sources ==
- Curti, Roberto (2019). Italian Gothic Horror Films, 1980-1989. McFarland. ISBN 978-1476672434.
