= Amityville 4: The Evil Escapes =

1989 television film by Sandor Stern

- Release poster
- Also known as: Amityville: The Evil Escapes
- Genre: Horror
- Based on: Amityville: The Evil Escapes by John G. Jones
- Written by: Sandor Stern
- Directed by: Sandor Stern
- Starring: Patty Duke; Jane Wyatt; Fredric Lehne; Norman Lloyd
- Music by: Rick Conrad
- Country of origin: United States
- Original language: English

Production
- Executive producer: Steve White
- Producers: Barry Bernardi; Kenneth Atchity (NBC)
- Cinematography: Tom Richmond
- Editor: Skip Schoolnik
- Running time: 95 minutes
- Production companies: Steve White Productions; Spectacor Films

Original release
- Network: NBC
- Release: May 12, 1989

Amityville 4: The Evil Escapes (also known on screen as Amityville Horror: The Evil Escapes) is a 1989 American made-for-television supernatural horror film written and directed by Sandor Stern, and starring Patty Duke, Jane Wyatt and Fredric Lehne. The fourth film based on The Amityville Horror, it premiered on NBC on May 12, 1989. This was the only Amityville sequel to be based on a book in the main book series. A film adaptation for Amityville: The Horror Returns was to air on NBC but the film was never made.

== Plot ==
On a rainy night, six priests, led by Father Manfred, enter the infamous Amityville, New York house and start to exorcise it. One of the priests, Father Dennis Kibbler, is in an upstairs bedroom and begins to bless it when he sees a glowing brass floor lamp. As he begins to chant, a burst of energy emerges from the outlet, through the cord, and into the lamp. A demonic face appears in the large round bulb. Kibbler is knocked across the room and is rendered unconscious.

A few days later, a real estate agency decides to have a yard sale by selling the previous owners' items left in the house. Father Manfred believes that the evil spirits are finally gone from the house. Meanwhile, at the yard sale, a woman named Helen Royce and her friend Rhona are looking through the items when Helen finds the lamp. At only $100.00, Helen decides to buy the lamp as a birthday present for her sister Alice Leacock, explaining that she and Alice send each other rather ugly gifts as a long-running joke. While checking the lamp, Helen cuts her finger on a brass collar around the bulb. Ignoring the cut on her finger, Helen buys the lamp. Helen's finger begins to get infected and discolored as the day goes on and she later dies of tetanus.

One week later, the lamp arrives at Alice's house, a large, three-story home over a beach in a small town called Dancott, California. That day, Alice's daughter, Nancy Evans, and her three children, Amanda, Brian, and the youngest child, quiet, mysterious Jessica, move in with Alice. Once they arrive, Alice decides to open the package containing the lamp. Nancy thinks the lamp is hideous, while Alice finds it interesting. Once the lamp is turned on, Alice's parrot, Fred, begins to act crazy, and her cat, Pepper, scratches Amanda. While the rest of the family pays little to no attention to the lamp, Jessica seems to be drawn toward it.

The lamp then begins to manipulate electrical devices around the house or perform seemingly impossible feats, such as killing the parrot and putting it in the toaster oven, turning on the kitchen sink's garbage disposal, and cutting off the hand of Danny, the son and apprentice of electrician Reade, and vandalizing Jessica's room.

When Nancy calls Jake, a plumber, to fix the pipes, the lamp murders him by drowning him in sewage and then makes his van leave on its own, making it seem like he left. Jessica is drawn to the lamp and starts to believe her dead father Frank's spirit is inside it. Meanwhile, Father Kibbler, while staying at Father Manfred's place, gets a call from the lamp, which makes smoke come out of the phone and melts the speaker. Worried, he travels to Dancott to investigate. When most of the family is away, Jessica is entranced by the lamp, which then uses its extension cord to murder their housekeeper, Peggy.

The police investigate, though they do not find Jake's body. Father Kibbler contacts Nancy and tries to convince her that the evil has taken possession of an object from the Amityville house. They rush home, only to find that the lamp used a window to knock out Amanda and has brainwashed Jessica, who stabs Father Kibbler in the shoulder while the lamp's extension cord tries to stop him from exorcising it. Alice saves the day by grabbing the lamp and throwing it out of the window, shattering it on the rocky shoreline below. The movie ends with the family thinking their ordeal is over, not realizing that Jake's body is still inside their house. The camera pans to the remains of the lamp, showing the evil within has now possessed the family's cat, Pepper.

== Cast ==
- Patty Duke as Nancy Evans
- Jane Wyatt as Alice Leacock
- Fredric Lehne as Father Kibbler
- Lou Hancock as Peggy
- Brandy Gold as Jessica Evans
- Zoe Trilling as Amanda Evans (credited as Geri Betzler)
- Aron Eisenberg as Brian Evans
- Norman Lloyd as Father Manfred
- Robert Alan Browne as Donald McTear
- Gloria Cromwell as Rhona
- James Stern as Danny Read
- Peggy McCay as Helen Royce
- Warren Munson as Doctor
- David Elliott as New York Doctor
- Gary Davies as Jake
- Jon Rice as Frank Evans

== Production ==
The replica of the original Amityville house was located at 402 East M St., Wilmington, California. A facade was added to the side of the house to give it the Amityville appearance. The interiors of this house were filmed there as well.

The exteriors for Alice Leacock (Jane Wyatt)'s house were filmed at the James Sharp House, 11840 W. Telegraph Rd, Santa Paula, California. The house is an historical Italian Villa style home built in 1890. In reality, it does not back out onto an oceanside cliff as depicted in the movie. Instead, it backs out onto the Santa Paula Freeway, about a quarter of a mile behind the house. For a second, there is a tower of the house in the distance while driving on the Freeway. The interiors of Alice's house were filmed at the Woodbury-Story House in Altadena, California.

Hospital scenes were filmed at the California Hospital Medical Center in Los Angeles. An exterior shot of the John Marshall High School in Los Angeles was also used.

== Continuity ==
Despite the destruction of the house in the conclusion of the previous film Amityville 3-D, it manages to make an appearance in this film. The films after 3-D usually do not pick up where the previous film left off, so no explanation has ever been given as to how the house is still standing. It is possible this film may take place before Amityville 3-D due to the house already being empty in that film and after the yard sale in this one, which was later explained in Amityville: It's About Time. The furniture that was left in the house in the beginning of the film is believed to be owned by the Lutz family in the first film The Amityville Horror. The film also makes a reference to Amityville II: The Possession.

== Release ==
The film premiered on NBC on May 12, 1989. According to the Nielsen ratings, 8.6 million homes tuned into the premiere.

== Home media ==
Amityville 4: The Evil Escapes was distributed on home video by Medusa in the United Kingdom in April 1990. It was released on DVD twice by Allumination Filmworks in 2003 and 2007. In 2019, Vinegar Syndrome released the film on Blu-ray in the US which was included in the boxset "Amityville: The Cursed Collection". In 2022, the film was released on Blu-ray in the UK courtesy of Screenbound Pictures Ltd.

== Reception ==
On The A.V. Club's web site, Amityville 4 is one movie listed in the article "Night of the Killer Lamp: 23 Ridiculous Horror-Movie Adversaries". The article states the film's efforts to make a possessed lamp seem scary "border on camp". Richard Scheib of Moria called it the worst of the films bearing the Amityville name, citing "the absurd heavy-handedness of Sandor Stern's direction". Edison Smith of VHS Revival rated it 3.5 out of 5 and called the lamp "a contender for the most unlikely horror villain ever imagined". Reviewing the Vinegar Syndrome Blu-ray for Horror DNA, Robert Gold called it "a middle-of-the-road sequel" that "works more often than not thanks to Stern's capable direction".
