= Amityville: The Evil Escapes (book) =

1988 novel by John G. Jones

- Author: John G. Jones
- Language: English
- Series: The Amityville Horror
- Genre: Horror
- Publisher: Tudor Communications
- Publication date: June 1988
- Publication place: United States
- Media type: Book
- Pages: 420
- ISBN: 978-0-944276-05-1
- OCLC: 25239357
- Preceded by: Amityville: The Final Chapter
- Followed by: Amityville: The Horror Returns

Amityville: The Evil Escapes is a 1988 horror fiction book and the fourth installment in the Amityville series of books. The book is known for starting the fictional sequels by John G. Jones.

== History ==
In 1979, George and Kathy Lutz announced in an interview that the supernatural forces had followed them from New York to California. When they fled the fabled Amityville house, they took nothing but the clothes on their backs. People who had bought items from the auction at which all their personal belongings were sold were experiencing problems too. The Lutzes also announced that there would be three more "Amityville" books. The Amityville Horror Picture Book, A Force of Magnitude telling their continuing ordeal, and Unwanted Company telling the stories of those who bought the items and later experienced problems. John G. Jones re-wrote A Force of Magnitude which became The Amityville Horror Part II and later he completed the trilogy with Amityville: The Final Chapter. After Jones and the Lutzes ended their association Jones continued to write sequels. The first was a re-write of Unwanted Company which became Amityville: The Evil Escapes.

== Plot ==
When the Lutzes fled 112 Ocean Ave they left all their personal belongings behind. To get rid of extra items a yard sale is held at the house. All the items are at bargain prices and too good to pass up. Little do the buyers know they are getting more than they bargained for.

== Films ==
There are two films based on the book: the first one is entitled Amityville 4: The Evil Escapes and the second is Amityville: It's About Time. Although based on the same book, each has a different backstory. In addition, where the "haunted" items were obtained varies from film to film. In The Evil Escapes, they were found at a yard sale; in It's About Time, they were located at a demolition site.
