= The Amityville Horror =

1977 book by Jay Anson

- The first edition of the book
- Author: Jay Anson
- Language: English
- Genre: Horror novel
- Publisher: Prentice Hall
- Publication date: September 13, 1977
- Publication place: United States
- Media type: Print (hardback & paperback)
- Pages: 201 pp
- ISBN: 978-0553131604
- Followed by: The Amityville Horror Part II

The Amityville Horror is a book by American author Jay Anson, published in September 1977. It is also the basis of a series of films released from 1979 onward. The book is based on the claims of paranormal experiences by the Lutz family but has led to controversy and lawsuits over its truthfulness.

== Historical basis ==
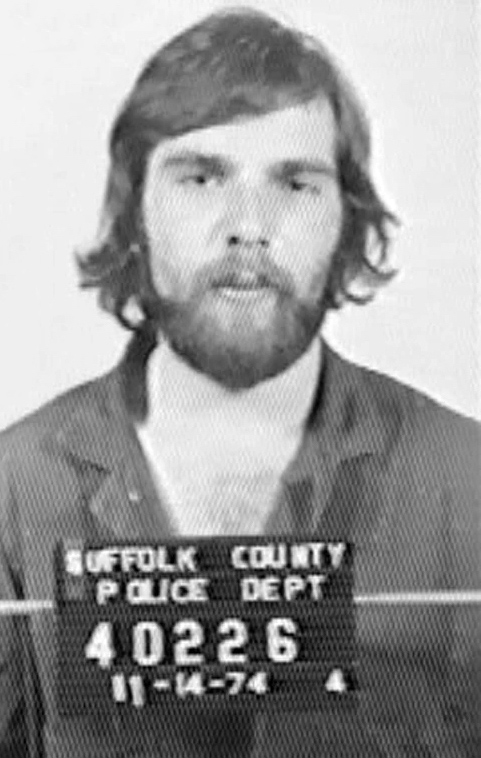
Ronald DeFeo Jr., who shot and killed six members of his family in 1974

On November 13, 1974, 23-year-old Ronald DeFeo Jr. shot and killed six members of his family at their home. They lived at 112 Ocean Avenue, a large Dutch Colonial Revival house situated in a suburban neighborhood in Amityville, on the south shore of Long Island, New York. After a trial lasting seven weeks, DeFeo was convicted of second-degree murder in November 1975 and sentenced to six terms of 25 years to life in prison. DeFeo died in prison in March 2021.

In December 1975, George and Kathy Lutz moved into the house with their three children and dog, Harry. After 28 days, the Lutzes fled the house, claiming to have been terrorized by paranormal phenomena while living there. The events were first publicly reported in Newsday, a local newspaper, on February 14, 1976. According to the newspaper's report, some friends of the Lutzes confirmed that they had experienced strange phenomena which caused them to leave, while another said that they left because the house's heating system had failed and they could not afford to repair it.

== Plot ==
The book describes the house at 112 Ocean Avenue as remaining empty for 13 months after the DeFeo murders. In December 1975, George and Kathleen Lutz bought the house for what was considered to be a bargain price of $80,000 (equivalent to $479,000 in 2025). The five-bedroom house was built in Dutch Colonial style, and had a distinctive gambrel roof. It also had a swimming pool and a boathouse, as it was located on a canal. George and Kathy married in July 1975, and each had their own homes, but they wanted to start fresh with a new property. Kathy had three children from a previous marriage: Daniel, 9, Christopher, 7, and Melissa (Missy), 5. They also owned a crossbreed Malamute/Labrador dog named Harry. During their first inspection of the house, the real estate broker told them about the DeFeo murders and asked if this would affect their decision. After discussing the matter, they decided that it was not a problem.

The Lutz family moved in on December 18, 1975. (Note: The prologue of The Amityville Horror states that "they moved in on December 23". In Chapter 1, the date is given as December 18. This discrepancy was criticized by Stephen and Roxanne Salch Kaplan in The Amityville Horror Conspiracy. Events in the book dated to the period before December 23 suggest that the December 18 date may be incorrect. According to a contemporary news report, the Lutzes purchased the house on December 23 and moved in "a few days later". Another report from the same newspaper a few days later stated that the family moved in on December 18. Records held by the Suffolk County Clerk confirm that George and Kathleen Lutz purchased the house from the estate of Ronald and Louise DeFeo on December 23, 1975.) Much of the DeFeo family's furniture remained in the house and was included for $400 as part of the deal. A friend of George Lutz learned about the history of the house and insisted on having it blessed. At the time, George was a non-practicing Methodist and had no experience of what this would entail. Kathy was a non-practicing Catholic and explained the process. George knew a Catholic priest named Father Ray who agreed to carry out the house blessing (in Anson's book, real-life priest Father Ralph J. Pecoraro is referred to as Father Mancuso for privacy reasons).

Father Mancuso was a lawyer, judge of the Catholic Court and psychotherapist who lived at the local Sacred Heart Rectory. He arrived to perform the blessing while George and Kathy were unpacking their belongings on the afternoon of December 18, 1975, and went into the building to carry out the rites. When he flicked the first holy water and began to pray, he heard a masculine voice demand that he "get out". When leaving the house, Father Mancuso did not mention this incident to either George or Kathy. On December 24, 1975, Father Mancuso called George Lutz and advised him to stay out of the second floor room where he had heard the mysterious voice, the former bedroom of Marc and John Matthew DeFeo, that Kathy planned to use as a sewing room, but the call was cut short by static. Following his visit to the house, Father Mancuso allegedly developed a high fever and blisters on his hands similar to stigmata. At first George and Kathy experienced nothing unusual in the house. Talking about their experiences subsequently, they reported that it was as if they "were each living in a different house".

By mid-January 1976, after another attempt at a house blessing by George and Kathy, they experienced what would turn out to be their final night in the house. The Lutzes declined to give a full account of the events that took place on this occasion, describing them as "too frightening".

After getting in touch with Father Mancuso, the Lutzes decided to take some belongings and stay at Kathy's mother's house in nearby Deer Park, New York, until they had sorted out the problems with the house. They claimed that the phenomena followed them there, with the final scene of Anson's book describing "greenish-black slime" coming up the staircase towards them. On January 14, 1976, George and Kathy Lutz, with their three children and their dog Harry, left 112 Ocean Avenue, leaving all of their possessions behind. The next day, a mover arrived to remove the possessions to send to the Lutzes. He reported no paranormal phenomena while inside the house.

The book was written after Tam Mossman, an editor at the publishing house Prentice Hall, introduced George and Kathy Lutz to Jay Anson. The Lutzes did not work directly with Anson, but submitted around 45 hours of tape-recorded recollections to him, which were used as the basis of the book. Estimates of the sales of the book are around 10 million copies from its numerous editions. Anson is said to have based the title of The Amityville Horror on "The Dunwich Horror" by H. P. Lovecraft, which was published in 1929.

== Other books ==
- The story of The Amityville Horror was continued in a series of books by John G. Jones, with The Amityville Horror Part II (1982), Amityville: The Final Chapter (1985), Amityville: The Evil Escapes (1988) and Amityville: The Horror Returns (1989). In 1991, Amityville: The Nightmare Continues by Robin Karl was published.
- Hans Holzer wrote three books relating the story: Murder in Amityville, The Amityville Curse and The Secret of Amityville. Murder in Amityville was used as the basis of the 1982 film Amityville II: The Possession and the 1990 film The Amityville Curse was based on the book of the same name. William Weber, the defense attorney for Ronald DeFeo Jr. at his trial, recommended Holzer to DeFeo in 1979 as a way for DeFeo to obtain a book deal telling his side of the story. The 1983 film Amityville 3-D was also turned into a novelization by Gordon McGill. Mentally Ill in Amityville, a factual account of the case by Will Savive, was published in 2008.

== Disputes over accuracy ==
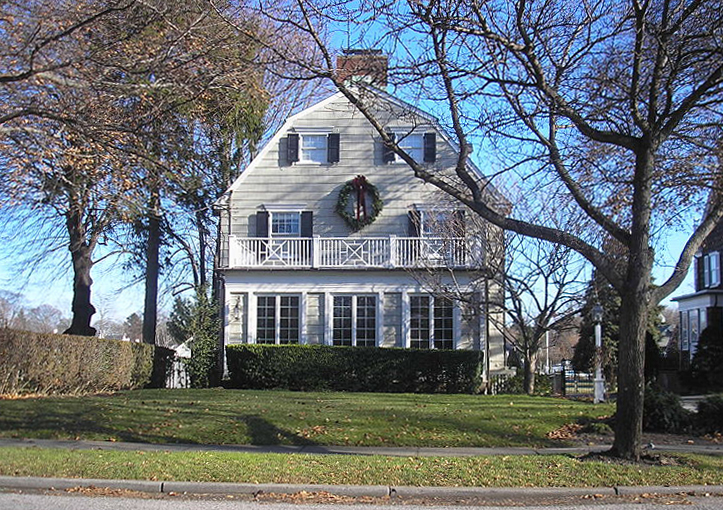
112 Ocean Avenue, the house described in the book

The role of Father Pecoraro ("Father Mancuso" in the book) has been given considerable attention. Father Pecoraro stated in an affidavit during a lawsuit in the late 1970s that his only contact with the Lutzes concerning the matter had been by telephone. Other accounts say that Father Pecoraro did visit the house but experienced nothing unusual there. In 1979, he described his experience while blessing the Amityville house during an interview for the television series In Search of.... In the interview, he makes it clear that he did in fact enter the home and that he was slapped by an invisible force and told to "get out" by a disembodied voice.

James and Barbara Cromarty, who bought the house for $55,000 (equivalent to $292,000 in 2025) in March 1977, rejected the claims of physical damage to doors, locks, and windows. Barbara Cromarty argued that they appeared to be the original items and had not been repaired. The couple also revealed that the "Red Room" was a small closet in the basement and would have been known to the Lutzes because it was not concealed in any way. Local Shinnecock Indians rejected the claim made in chapter 11 of the book that the house was built on a site where the tribe had once abandoned the mentally ill and the dying.

Researchers Rick Moran and Peter Jordan rejected the claim of cloven hoof prints in the snow on January 1, 1976. Their investigation revealed that there had been no snowfall at that time. No neighbor reported anything unusual during the time that the Lutzes were living there. Police officers are depicted visiting the house in the book and 1979 film, but records showed that the Lutzes did not call the police. There was no bar in Amityville called The Witches' Brew at the time.

Stephen Kaplan and other critics have pointed out that changes were made to the book as it was reprinted in different editions. In the original hardcover edition, Father Pecoraro's car is "an old tan Ford", and he experiences an incident in which the hood flies up against the windshield while he is driving it. In later editions, the car is described as a Chevrolet Nova, before reverting to a Ford.

In May 1977, George and Kathy Lutz filed a lawsuit against William Weber (the defense lawyer for Ronald DeFeo Jr.), Paul Hoffman (a writer working on an account of the hauntings), Bernard Burton and Frederick Mars (both alleged clairvoyants who had examined the house), along with Good Housekeeping magazine, the New York Sunday News, and the Hearst Corporation. The Lutzes alleged misappropriation of names for trade purposes, invasion of privacy, and mental distress. The claims against the news corporations were dropped and the remainder of the lawsuit was heard by Brooklyn District Court judge Jack B. Weinstein. In September 1979, Judge Weinstein dismissed the Lutzes' claims. In the September 17, 1979 issue of People magazine, William Weber wrote: "I know this book is a hoax. We created this horror story over many bottles of wine." This refers to a meeting that Weber had with George and Kathy Lutz, during which they discussed what became the outline of Anson's book. Judge Weinstein also expressed concern about the conduct of William Weber and Bernard Burton relating to the affair, stating: "There is a very serious ethical question when lawyers become literary agents." Weber himself "filed a two-million-dollar lawsuit against the couple, charging them with reneging on their book deal", while the Cromartys launched a suit "against the Lutz parents, author Anson, and his publisher. [...] During the trials, the Lutzes admitted that virtually everything in The Amityville Horror was pure fiction", according to an article in the Skeptical Inquirer.

George Lutz maintained that events in the book were "mostly true". In June 1979, George and Kathy Lutz took a polygraph test relating to their experiences at the house. The polygraph tests were performed by Chris Gugas and Michael Rice, who were reportedly among the top five polygraph experts in America. The results, in Rice's opinion, did not indicate lying. However, skeptics have pointed out that polygraph tests "are notoriously unreliable", and that "there is little evidence that polygraph tests can accurately detect lies."

In October 2000, The History Channel broadcast Amityville: The Haunting and Amityville: Horror or Hoax?, a two-part documentary made by horror screenwriter/producer Daniel Farrands.

The debate continues concerning the accuracy of The Amityville Horror. The various owners of the house since 1976 have publicly reported no problems while living there. James Cromarty bought the house in 1977 and lived there with his wife Barbara for ten years; he commented: "Nothing weird ever happened, except for people coming by because of the book and the movie."

== Films ==
The people and events fictionalized in The Amityville Horror have been the subject of a number of films (many of which share no connection other than the reference to Amityville):

- The Amityville Horror (1979)
- Amityville II: The Possession (1982)
- Amityville 3-D (1983) (made in 3-D and has also been released as Amityville III: The Demon)
- Amityville 4: The Evil Escapes (1989)
- The Amityville Curse (1990)
- Amityville: It's About Time (1992)
- Amityville: A New Generation (1993)
- Amityville Dollhouse (1996)
- The Amityville Horror (2005 remake)
- The Amityville Haunting (2011)
- The Amityville Asylum (2013)
- Amityville Death House (2015)
- The Amityville Playhouse (2015)
- Amityville: No Escape (2016)
- Amityville: Vanishing Point (2016)
- The Amityville Legacy (2016)
- The Amityville Terror (2016)
- Amityville Prison (2017)
- Amityville: The Awakening (2017)
- Amityville: Evil Never Dies (2017)
- Amityville Exorcism (2017)
- The Amityville Murders (2018)
- The Amityville Harvest (2020)
- Amityville: Where the Echo Lives (2024)
- Amityvillenado (2025)

The 1979 film, based on Jay Anson's novel, is the best known in the series. James Brolin and Margot Kidder portray the couple George and Kathy Lutz. The part of the priest who blesses the house (renamed Father Delaney in the film) was played by Academy Award–winning actor Rod Steiger. The first three Amityville films received a theatrical release, while the fourth film was made for television by NBC. The sequels from the 1990s were released direct to video and contain virtually no material relating to the Lutz family or the DeFeo murders. Instead, they concentrate on paranormal phenomena caused by cursed items supposedly linked to the house.

A notable feature of the Amityville Horror films is the distinctive jack-o'-lantern-like appearance of the house, which was created by two quarter round windows on the third floor attic level. The windows are often illuminated in the films, giving the appearance of menacing eyes. The first three films were filmed at a house in Toms River, New Jersey which had been converted to look like 112 Ocean Avenue after the authorities in Amityville denied permission for location filming. Although not all of the films in The Amityville Horror series are set at the former Lutz home on Ocean Avenue, the distinctive Dutch Colonial house is traditionally used as the main image in promotional material.

In 2005, a remake of the original Amityville Horror film was released, with the tagline "Katch 'em and kill 'em," referring to the claimed link between the house in Ocean Avenue and John Ketcham, whose name has been linked to witchcraft in Salem, Massachusetts but remains a controversial and elusive figure. This version exaggerates the isolation of 112 Ocean Avenue by depicting it as a remote house similar to the Overlook Hotel in Stephen King's The Shining. In reality, 112 Ocean Avenue is a suburban house within 50 feet (15 m) of other houses in the neighborhood. The house used in the 2005 version was in Silver Lake, Wisconsin, while other location work was shot in nearby Antioch, Illinois. The child character Jodie DeFeo, appearing in the film, is fictional and was not one of the victims of the shootings by Ronald DeFeo Jr. in November 1974. George Lutz described the 2005 remake as "drivel" and sued the makers for breach of contract, defamation and libel. He objected particularly to the scene in the film where the male lead – named George Lutz and played by Ryan Reynolds – is shown killing the family dog with an axe. The film also shows the George Lutz character building coffins for members of his own family. The defamation claim was dismissed by a Los Angeles court in November 2005, while other issues related to the lawsuit remained unresolved at the time of George Lutz's death.

The documentary My Amityville Horror (2012) features an interview with Daniel Lutz, one of the children who lived in the house during the period on which the book and films are based. Lutz echoes the original story as told by his mother and stepfather. He also makes additional claims that both he and George Lutz were possessed and that George Lutz demonstrated telekinetic abilities, and claims that George's dabbling in the occult may have initiated the demonic events. However, Daniel's brother, Christopher, claims that many of the events in the book were exaggerated by their stepfather for financial gain.

== Legacy ==
During the period in which the Lutz family was living at 112 Ocean Avenue, Stephen Kaplan, a self-styled vampirologist and ghost hunter, was called in to investigate the house. Kaplan and the Lutzes had a falling out after Kaplan said that he would expose any fraud that was found. Kaplan went on to write a critical book titled The Amityville Horror Conspiracy with his wife Roxanne Salch Kaplan. The book was published in 1995.

The Lutzes first publicly discussed their experiences in the house at a press conference on February 16, 1976, at the law offices of Bernard Burton & Weber, which had unsuccessfully defended DeFeo in his murder trial a few months earlier. William Weber, DeFeo's lawyer, said that the Lutzes were providing evidence which could lead to a new trial for DeFeo.

On the night of March 6, 1976, the house was investigated by Ed and Lorraine Warren, a husband and wife team self-described as demonologists, together with a crew from the television station Channel 5 New York and reporter Michael Linder of WNEW-FM. During the course of the investigation Gene Campbell took a series of infrared time-lapse photographs. One of the images allegedly showed a "demonic boy" with glowing eyes who was standing at the foot of a staircase. The photograph did not emerge into the public domain until 1979, when George and Kathy Lutz and Rod Steiger appeared on The Merv Griffin Show to promote the release of the first film. Parapsychologist Hans Holzer also investigated 112 Ocean Avenue. The Warrens and Holzer have suggested that the house is occupied by malevolent spirits due to its history. The Warrens' visit to the house was depicted in the 2016 film The Conjuring 2.

George Lutz registered the phrase The Amityville Horror as a trademark in 2002 and it is referred to as The Amityville Horror™ on his official website. Lutz claimed that the film producers embellished or fabricated events portrayed in the 1979 version and the 2005 remake. He also claimed that the producers of the 2005 film did not involve his family and that they used his name without permission. Kathleen Theresa Lutz (October 13, 1946 – August 17, 2004) died of emphysema and George Lee Lutz (January 1, 1947 – May 8, 2006) died of heart disease. The couple divorced in the late 1980s, but remained on good terms.

The house known as 112 Ocean Avenue still exists, but it has been renovated and the address changed to discourage sightseers from visiting it. The quarter round windows have been removed and the house today looks considerably different from its depiction in the films. The house in Toms River used as the location for the first three films has also been modified for the same reason. For the 2005 film version, the house address was changed to 412 Ocean Avenue. The 2005 film remake says that the basement of the Lutz home was built in 1692, but 112 Ocean Avenue – also known as High Hopes – was built around 1924 for John and Catherine Moynahan.

The local residents and authorities in Amityville, New York, are unhappy with the attention that The Amityville Horror brings to the town, and tend to decline requests to discuss it publicly. The website of the Amityville Historical Society makes no mention of the murders by Ronald DeFeo Jr. in 1974 or the period that the Lutz family lived at 112 Ocean Avenue. When the History Channel made its documentary about The Amityville Horror in 2000, no member of the Historical Society would discuss the matter on camera.

The episode of CSI: NY first broadcast on October 31, 2007, was a Halloween edition based on The Amityville Horror. Entitled "Boo", it features a house in Amityville where a family has died in circumstances similar to the DeFeo murders.

In May 2010, the house was placed on the market with an asking price of $1.15 million. In August 2010, the house was sold to a local resident for $950,000. On August 21, 2010, the departing owner held a moving sale at the house and hundreds of people turned up for the event. They were allowed to go inside the house, but not to visit the upstairs rooms or the basement.

The 2012 documentary film My Amityville Horror recounts the story as told by George and Kathy Lutz's son, Daniel Lutz. The film was written and directed by Eric Walter.

== See also ==
- Borley Rectory
- The Black Hope Horror, a 1991 non-fiction book about a couple living in a purportedly haunted house
