= Amityville 3-D =

1983 film by Richard Fleischer

- Theatrical release poster
- Directed by: Richard Fleischer
- Written by: David Ambrose (Note: Credited as William Wales.)
- Produced by: Stephen F. Kesten; Antonio Rubio
- Starring: Tony Roberts; Tess Harper; Robert Joy; Candy Clark
- Cinematography: Fred Schuler
- Edited by: Frank J. Urioste
- Music by: Howard Blake
- Production company: Dino De Laurentiis Corporation
- Distributed by: Orion Pictures
- Release date: November 18, 1983 (U.S.)
- Running time: 93 minutes
- Countries: Mexico; United States
- Language: English
- Box office: $6.3 million

Amityville 3-D (also known as Amityville III: The Demon) is a 1983 supernatural horror film directed by Richard Fleischer and starring Tony Roberts, Tess Harper, Robert Joy, Candy Clark, Lori Loughlin, and Meg Ryan. It’s an international co-production between Mexico and the United States. The third film based in the Amityville Horror series, it was written by William Wales, a pseudonym for David Ambrose. It was one of a spate of 3D films released in the early 1980s, and was the only Orion Pictures film shot in the format.

Due to a lawsuit between the Lutz family and Dino De Laurentiis over the storyline (which did not involve the Lutz family), Amityville 3-D was not initially promoted as a sequel, and the name Lutz is never used in the film. However, the film does make a reference to the original Amityville Horror story. The character of John Baxter (Roberts) is loosely based on Stephen Kaplan, who was trying to prove the Lutzes' story was a hoax at the time.

The film was released by Orion Pictures on November 18, 1983, and was panned by critics.

== Plot ==
After he exposes a pair of con artists with his partner Melanie in the infamous 112 Ocean Avenue house in Amityville, New York, journalist John Baxter is persuaded to purchase the house by real estate agent Clifford Sanders. While preparing the house for John, Clifford investigates footsteps in the attic. He is locked in the room, where a swarm of flies attack and kill him. John believes Clifford died of a stroke, even after Melanie shows him some photos she took of the real estate agent before his death, depicting him as a rotting corpse.

While John is at work, he nearly dies in a malfunctioning elevator. Simultaneously, Melanie experiences bizarre occurrences in John's house. She is found later that night by John, hysterical and cowering against the wall. Her attempts to convince John that something is inside the house fall on deaf ears. Later, while looking over blowups of the photos of Clifford, Melanie discovers a demonic-looking face in the pictures. When she attempts to show the photos to John, she is killed in a horrific car accident. Melanie's death is ruled accidental by everyone, including John, who remains oblivious to the evil in his home.

While John is away one day, his daughter, Susan, her friend Lisa, and their boyfriends Jeff and Roger use a Ouija board in the attic. The game tells them that Susan is in danger. Growing bored, Susan and the others go out in John's motorboat where she falls into the water and drowns. John's estranged wife Nancy, who had come over looking for Susan, is surprised to see a drenched Susan silently walk up the stairs. Outside John arrives home to find Susan's friends bringing her lifeless body to shore. Nancy has a nervous breakdown and believing Susan is still alive and will return shortly, refuses to leave, even for Susan's funeral.

After having nightmares about the old well in the basement and unable to deal with Nancy's delusions that Susan is still alive, John allows his friend, paranormal investigator Doctor Elliot West, and a team of paranormal investigators to set up in the house, to help prove if Nancy actually saw something or not. As Elliot and John watch, Nancy is confronted by a spectral being speaking in Susan's voice. Nancy follows the specter into the basement, where the old well has filled with liquid. Elliot urges whatever is in the well to reveal itself and restore Susan to life. Instead, a demon leaps from the well, burns Elliot's face with fiery breath and drags him to Hell. The house begins to implode. Much of Elliot's team is killed by flying and exploding objects, but John, Nancy, and several others escape through a window. As John and Nancy leave, the well bubbles ominously as an eerily glowing fly emerges from it.

== Cast ==
- Tony Roberts as John Baxter
- Tess Harper as Nancy Baxter
- Robert Joy as Elliot West
- Candy Clark as Melanie
- Lori Loughlin as Susan Baxter
- Meg Ryan as Lisa
- Neill Barry as Jeff
- Peter Kowanko as Roger
- Josefina Echánove as Dolores
- John Beal as Harold Caswell
- Leora Dana as Emma Caswell
- John Harkins as Clifford Sanders
- Carlos Romero as David Cohler

== Production ==
=== Development ===
Due to a lawsuit filed against Orion Pictures by George and Kathy Lutz, whose claims of supernatural occurrences served as the basis for the book The Amityville Horror and its 1979 film adaptation, Amityville 3-D was not initially billed as a sequel to the previous installment, Amityville II: The Possession (1982), and the name Lutz is not mentioned in the film.

The court ultimately sided with Orion Pictures in the case, declaring that the Lutz family could not claim the word Amityville, the name of the Long Island town in which the alleged supernatural occurrences took place. Despite this, the film was still not promoted as a sequel to the previous two films.

Director Richard Fleischer, known for the films Fantastic Voyage (1966), 10 Rillington Place (1971), and Soylent Green (1973), was hired to direct. Screenwriter David Ambrose wrote the film under the pseudonym William Wales. The character of John Baxter was based on Stephen Kaplan, a paranormal investigator who was attempting to disprove the Lutz's story as a hoax.

=== Filming ===
Amityville 3-D was an international co-production between the United States and Mexico, like the previous installment Amityville II: The Possession. Exterior scenes were shot at the same house in Toms River, New Jersey where the first two films in the Amityville series were filmed, which closely resembled the infamous house in Amityville, New York. A house nearby was employed for the exterior of Nancy Baxter's house. Interiors were filmed at Estudios Churubusco in Mexico City, likewise the interiors of Dr. Elliot West's laboratory and the magazine's offices. Melanie's car accident was filmed on the streets of Mexico City.

Amityville 3-D was filmed using ArriVision, a camera operating system used for several other 3D films of the period, including Friday the 13th Part III (1982) and Jaws 3-D (1983).

== Music ==
Howard Blake wrote a score for the film, which was released on CD in 2000 as part of the original orchestral score for Flash Gordon.

== Release ==
Orion Pictures released Amityville 3-D in 3D in the United States on November 18, 1983. It was the last film in the The Amityville Horror film franchise to receive a theatrical release until the 2005 remake of the original film.

=== Home media ===
While released theatrically in 3-D, the only 3-D home release of the film has been on DVD in the UK and as of August 2012, also in Scandinavia. In October 2013, Scream Factory released a 3-D Blu-ray of Amityville 3-D, along with The Amityville Horror and Amityville II: The Possession.

MGM Home Entertainment originally released the DVD with the theatrical title Amityville 3-D (also the title on the opening title card of the film itself) on the box artwork. However, they received many complaints as the film was not actually in 3-D, and some even mistakenly mistook the release as a 3-D version of the original 1979 film The Amityville Horror. Due to this, they re-released the DVD with the foreign territory title Amityville III: The Demon on the box artwork, despite the film itself retaining Amityville 3-D on the title card.

== Reception ==
=== Box office ===
Amityville 3-D opened at number one in the U.S. its opening weekend, grossing $2.4 million. Its final US gross was $6.3 million.

=== Critical response ===
==== Contemporary ====
Variety wrote, "A new cast of characters and the addition of 3-D does little to pump new life, supernatural or otherwise, into this tired genre.” Janet Maslin of The New York Times wrote, "Once the first two films in a series have exhausted most opportunities for action, the third is liable to average half a dozen exposition scenes for every eventful episode." Of the 3D, she said "3-D exposition is the stuff of which headaches are made; the footage tends to be so dark that you can barely tell whether it's night or day."

Kevin Thomas of the Los Angeles Times alternately gave the film a favorable review, writing that, though its screenplay is not as substantial as the previous film's, Fleischer's direction is "capable" and it is "a film of considerable style and assurance."

==== Modern appraisal ====
On the review aggregator website Rotten Tomatoes, 18% of 22 critics' reviews are positive. The website's consensus reads: "A gimmicky Amityville retread with insufferable characters." Metacritic, which uses a weighted average, assigned the film a score of 28 out of 100, based on 8 critics, indicating "generally unfavorable" reviews.

Nick Schager of Slant Magazine awarded the film one out of four stars in a 2005 review, describing the film as "too poorly written, awkwardly staged, and pathologically stupid to register as campy fun."

In a 2012 review, Time Out wrote of the film: "A plummeting lift, seances, a spontaneous combustion set-piece and prophetic-of-doom photos are timed to keep us engaged, but never coalesce into a joined-up plot. To pad things out characters argue over story-lines from previous Amityville movies, while for 3-D purposes, wasps, furniture and minor players are hurled in our direction at varying intervals. There's a nice irreverent bit by a teenage Meg Ryan."

== Related works ==
A novelization of the film was written by Gordon McGill. A third sequel in the series, Amityville 4: The Evil Escapes, was released as a television film in 1989.

== Sources ==
- Hayes, R. M. (1998). 3-D Movies: A History and Filmography of Stereoscopic Cinema. Jefferson, North Carolina: McFarland & Company. ISBN 978-1-476-60850-1.
