= Hans Holzer =

American writer and parapsychologist

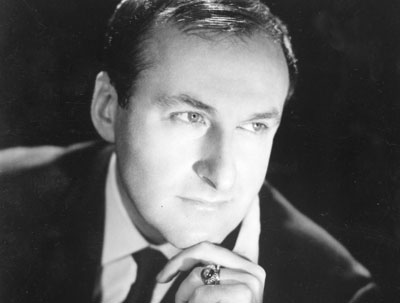
- Holzer in the 1960s
- Born: 26 January 1920; Vienna, Austria
- Died: 26 April 2009 (aged 89); Manhattan, New York City, U.S.
- Education: University of Vienna; Columbia University
- Occupations: Author; Parapsychologist
- Spouse: Catherine Buxhoeveden (m. 1962, divorced)
- Children: 2

Hans Holzer (26 January 1920 – 26 April 2009) was an American writer and parapsychologist. He wrote more than 120 books on supernatural and occult subjects for the popular market as well as several plays, musicals, films, and documentaries, and hosted a television show, Ghost Hunter (not to be confused with Ghost Hunters).

== Life and career ==
Holzer was born in Vienna, Austria, the son of Martha (Stransky) and Leo Holzer, a businessman. His interest in the supernatural was sparked at a young age by stories told to him by his uncle Henry. He went on to study archaeology and ancient history at the University of Vienna but as the family was Jewish, they decided it was unsafe to stay in Austria and left the country for New York City in 1938. He studied Japanese at Columbia University and, after studying comparative religion and parapsychology, claimed to have obtained a Ph.D. at a school called the London College of Applied Science which has never been validated. He went on to teach parapsychology at the New York Institute of Technology. Holzer wrote more than 120 books on ghosts and the afterlife.

His extensive involvement in researching the supernatural included investigating The Amityville Horror and some of the most prominent haunted locations around the world. He also worked with well-known trance mediums such as Ethel Johnson-Meyers, Sybil Leek, and Marisa Anderson. Holzer has been credited with creating the term "The Other Side" (already in use, however, in nineteenth-century spiritualism) or in full "The Other Side of Life". He is sometimes credited with having coined the term ghost hunter, which was the title of his first book on the paranormal published in 1963; however, an earlier book by Harry Price, published in 1936, was titled Confessions of a Ghost Hunter.

In 1970, Holzer published a study of spirit photography called Psychic Photography: Threshold of a New Science?. The book included photographs taken by the spirit photographer John Myers.

Holzer believed in life after death and the existence of ghosts, spirits, and "stay behinds". Ghosts were, according to him, imprints left in the environment which could be "picked up" by sensitive people. Spirits were intelligent beings who could interact with the living, while "stay behinds" were those who found themselves earth-bound after death. He also believed in reincarnation and the existence of "levels of consciousness".

Holzer and his wife Countess Catherine Geneviève Buxhoeveden, a sixth-generation descendant of Russian Empress Catherine the Great, had two daughters. The marriage was eventually dissolved.They divorced in 1985.

== The Amityville Horror ==
Holzer's most famous investigation was into The Amityville Horror case. In January 1977, Holzer and spiritual medium Ethel Meyers entered 112 Ocean Avenue in Amityville, New York. Meyers claimed that the house had been built over an ancient Native American burial ground and the angry spirit of a Shinnecock Indian Chief, "Rolling Thunder", had possessed the previous occupant, Ronald Defeo Jr., driving him to murder his family. Photographs taken at the scene revealed curious anomalies such as the halos which appeared in the supposed images of bullet marks made in the original 1974 murders. Holzer's claim that the house was built on Indian sacred land was, however, denied by the local Amityville Historical Society and it was pointed out that it was the Montaukett Indians, and not the Shinnecocks, who had been the original settlers in the area. Holzer went on to write several books about the subject, both fiction and non-fiction.

== Vegetarianism ==
Holzer was a vegetarian and teetotaler. In 1973, he authored The Vegetarian Way of Life. In the book he stated that "I myself am a Lactarian: I eat cheeses and milk products but I do not eat eggs or egg products. Those who are Lactarians like myself find that their diet is well-balanced and generally there is enough of a variety of foods available to them so that no problem of nutrition exists."

== Reception ==
Holzer's endorsement of psychics in ghost hunting was criticized in an article for the Journal for the Society for Psychical Research which "cast considerable doubt on the objectivity and reliability of his work as a whole." Holzer was a proponent of psychic archaeology, which has been widely criticized as pseudoscience.

His book Patterns of Destiny from 1975 appeared as a noticeable prop in the movie Flatliners, standing next to the framed photograph of Julia Roberts character's dead father.

Skeptical investigator Joe Nickell has written that Holzer did not provide verification for some of his claims and he credulously accepted spirit photographs, anecdotal reports, and other doubtful evidence.

Nickell also wrote that the mediums Holzer endorsed, Ethel Meyers and Sybil Leek, offered "unsubstantiated, even unverifiable claims, or information that can be gleaned from research sources or from knowledgeable persons by “cold reading” (an artful method of fishing for information)."

Fellow ghost hunter Peter Underwood wrote an obituary for Holzer in The Guardian, in which he disputed Holzer's claim (made in his 1979 book Murder in Amityville) that the house on Ocean Avenue in Amityville was built on the site of a Shinnecock burial ground.

Holzer's daughter, Alexandra Holzer, wrote a 2008 book titled Growing Up Haunted, based on her life with her father and his paranormal quest. The book was optioned by Vance Entertainment to be developed as a potential feature film.

Travel Channel began a TV series in 2019, The Holzer Files, that returns current ghost hunters to some of Hans Holzer's documented cases.

== Bibliography ==
- — (1963). Ghost Hunter.
- — (1965). Ghosts I've Met.
- — (1966). ESP and You.
- — (1966). Yankee Ghosts.
- — (1967). The Lively Ghosts of Ireland. Random House Value. ISBN 9780517168080.
- — (1968). Ghosts of the Golden West.
- — (1968). Predictions: Fact or Fallacy?.
- — (1968). Psychic Investigator. New York, Hawthorn Books.
- — (1968). Star in the East. New York, Harper & Row.
- — (1969). The Truth About Witchcraft.
- — (1969). Window to the Past: Exploring History Through ESP. Garden City, N.Y., Doubleday.
- — (1970). Born Again: The Truth About Reincarnation. Garden City, N.Y., Doubleday.
- — (1970). Life After Death: The Challenge and the Evidence.
- — (1970). Psychic Photography: Threshold of a New Science?.
- — (1970). The Psychic World of Bishop Pike. New York, Crown Publishers.
- — (1970). The Red Chindvit Conspiracy.
- — (1970). The Zodiac Affairs.
- — (1971). The Aquarian Age: Is There Intelligent Life on Earth?.
- — (1971). Charismatics: How to Make Things Happen. New York, Coward-McCann.
- — (1971). The Ghosts That Walk in Washington.
- — (1971). Hans Holzer's Haunted Houses: A Pictorial Register of the World's Most Interesting Ghost Houses.
- — (1971). The Prophets Speak. Indianapolis, Bobbs-Merrill.
- — (1971). Psycho-ecstasy: How to Awaken the Secret Powers of Your Inner Self.
- — (1972). Gothic Ghosts.
- — (1972). The Handbook of Parapsychology.
- — (1972). The New Pagans: An Inside Report On the Mystery Cults of Today.
- — (1972). The Phantoms of Dixie. Indianapolis, Bobbs-Merrill.
- — (1973). The Alchemy Deception.
- — (1973). The Habsburg Curse.
- — (1973). Possessed!.
- — (1973). The Power of Hypnosis: How Mind-to-Mind Communication Works.
- — (1973). Victorian Ghosts.
- — (1973). The Vegetarian Way of Life. Pyramid Books. ISBN 9780515032345.
- — (1974). Beyond Medicine.
- — (1974). Haunted Hollywood.
- — (1974). Patterns of Destiny: A Primer on Reincarnation.
- — (1974). The Truth About ESP: What It Is, How It Works and How You Develop It. Garden City, N.Y., Doubleday. ISBN 9780385052535.
- — (1975). Astrology: What It Can Do For You.
- — (1975). The Great British Ghost Hunt.
- — (1975). The Psychic World of Plants.
- — (1976). The Clairvoyant.
- — (1976). The Psychic Side of Dreams.
- — (1976). The Spirits of '76. Bobbs-Merrill. ISBN 9780672518843.
- — (1976). The UFO-NAUTS: New Facts on Extraterrestrial Landings.
- — (1976). The Unicorn.
- — (1977). Beyond This Life: A Factual Report on Survival After Death.
- — (1979). Elvis Presley Speaks.
- — (1979). Murder In Amityville.
- — (1979). Psychic Healing: The Alternate Way to Well-being.
- — (1979). Star Ghosts.
- — (1979). White House Ghosts.
- — (1979). Wicca: The Way of the Witches.
- — (1980). How to Win at Life.
- — (1980). Inside Witchcraft.
- — (1980). Westghosts: The Psychic World of California.
- — (1981). The Amityville Curse. Tower Books. ISBN 9780505516763.
- — (1981). The Entry.
- — (1981). Star of Destiny.
- — (1982). Amityville II: The Possession. Tower Books. ISBN 9780505516763.
- — (1984). Where the Ghosts Are: The Ultimate Guide to Haunted Houses.
- — (1985). The Alchemist.
- — (1985). Life Beyond Life: The Evidence of Reincarnation.
- — (1985). The Secret of Amityville.
- — (1989). Ghosts of New England: True Stories of Encounters With the Phantoms of New England and New York.
- — (1990). Great American Ghost Stories. Dorset Press. ISBN 9780880295567.
- — (1991). America's Haunted Houses: Public and Private. Longmeadow Press. ISBN 9780681411258.
- — (1992). America's Mysterious Places. Longmeadow Press. ISBN 9780681415713.
- — (1992). Ghosts of Old Europe. Dorset Press. ISBN 9780880297189.
- — (1992). Hans Holzer's Haunted House Album: A Ghostly Register of the World's Most Frightening Haunted Houses.
- — (1993). Elvis Speaks From the Beyond.
- — (1993). In Quest of Ghosts. Scholastic Incorporated. ISBN 9780590473460.
- — (1993). Love Beyond the Grave: True Cases of Ghostly Lovers.
- — (1994). Life Beyond: Compelling Evidence for Past Lives and Existence After Death.
- — (1994). Tales at Midnight. Courage Books. ISBN 9781561383917.
- — (1995). The Directory of Psychics: How to Find, Evaluate, and Communicate with Professional Psychics and Mediums.
- — (1995). Prophecies: Visions of the World's Fate- Truths, Possibilities, or Fallacies?.
- — (1996). The Secret of Healing: The Healing Powers of Ze'ev Kolman.
- — (1997). Are You Psychic? Unlocking the Power Within.
- — (1997). Ghosts: True Encounters with the World beyond.
- — (1997). Southern Ghosts.
- — (1999). Hans Holzer's Travel Guide to Haunted Houses.
- — (1999). Psychic: True Paranormal Experiences. Smithmark Publishers. ISBN 9780765109538.
- — (2000). The Psychic Yellow Pages.
- — (2001). Beyond Death: Conditions in the Afterlife. Hampton Roads Publishing Company. ISBN 9781571742025. (co-written with Philip Solomon)
- — (2001). Hans Holzer's Psychic Yellow Pages: The Very Best Psychics, Card Readers, Mediums, Astrologers, and Numerologists.
- — (2001). True Ghost Stories.
- — (2002). More Where The Ghosts Are: The Ultimate Guide to Haunted Houses.
- — (2002). Real Hauntings: True American Ghost Stories. Michael Friedman Publishing Group, Incorporated. ISBN 9781586635640.
- — (2002). Witches: True Encounters with Wicca, Wizards, Covens, Cults and Magick.
- — (2005). The Journey of the Magi.
- — (2006). The Ghost Hunter's Strangest Cases.
- — (2008). The Spirit Connection: How the Other Side Intervenes in Our Lives.
- — (2008). Commanding the Light: A Conversation about Paranormal Healing Between Antonio Silva and Hans Holzer. (co-written with Antonio Silva)
- — (2012). Famous Ghosts: True Encounters with the World Beyond.
- — (2012). Ghosts That Aren't: True Encounters with the World Beyond.
- — (2012). Haunted People: True Encounters with the World Beyond.
- — (2012). Haunted Places: True Encounters with the World Beyond.
- — (2012). Hypnosis: Controlling the Inner You.
- — (2012). An Introduction to Ghosts: True Encounters with the World Beyond.
- — (2012). Poltergeists: True Encounters with the World Beyond.
- — (2012). Stay-Behinds: True Encounters with the World Beyond.
- — (2012). This House Is Haunted: True Encounters with the World Beyond.
