= Joe Somebody =

2001 film by John Pasquin

- Theatrical release poster
- Directed by: John Pasquin
- Written by: John Scott Shepherd
- Produced by: Ken Atchity; Matthew Gross; Anne Kopelson; Arnold Kopelson; Brian Reilly
- Starring: Tim Allen; Julie Bowen; Kelly Lynch; Greg Germann; Hayden Panettiere; Patrick Warburton; Jim Belushi
- Cinematography: Daryn Okada
- Edited by: David Finfer
- Music by: George S. Clinton
- Production companies: Fox 2000 Pictures; Regency Enterprises; Kopelson Entertainment; Atchity Entertainment International
- Distributed by: 20th Century Fox
- Release date: December 21, 2001
- Running time: 99 minutes
- Country: United States
- Language: English
- Budget: $38 million
- Box office: $24.5 million

Joe Somebody is a 2001 American comedy-drama film written by John Scott Shepherd and directed by John Pasquin. The film stars Tim Allen as an ordinary man forced into violence by a workplace bully. Julie Bowen, Kelly Lynch, Greg Germann, Hayden Panettiere, Patrick Warburton, and Jim Belushi also star.

Screenwriter John Scott Shepherd wrote the script based on his experiences working in advertising. Though originally offered to Jim Carrey, the role of Joe Scheffer would eventually be taken by Allen. The film marked Allen and Pasquin's third feature together, after 1994's The Santa Clause and 1997's Jungle 2 Jungle. The entire film was shot over a nearly eight-week span in Minnesota.

The film was released in the United States by 20th Century Fox on December 21, 2001, to negative reviews and was a financial failure, grossing only $24.5 million worldwide on a $38 million budget. The film received one award nomination, which went to young Panettiere's performance as the title character's daughter.

== Plot ==
Joe Scheffer is a recently divorced single parent, and a talented audio/visual specialist at STARKe Pharmaceuticals. One day Joe pulls into the parking lot at work, accompanied by his young daughter Natalie, to find his co-worker Mark McKinney parking in a spot that has been reserved for those who have worked for the company for ten years. However, McKinney has only worked there for seven years. When McKinney is confronted by Joe about this, he assaults Joe in front of Natalie.

Joe falls into a state of self-pity until Meg Harper, the Wellness Coordinator at STARKe, accidentally ignites a fuse in him when, in a fit of frustration, she asks Joe, "What do you want?" Joe is suddenly stirred to action by this question, and decides he wants a rematch to reclaim his dignity and self-respect, which he felt McKinney took from him.

After issuing the challenge to McKinney (who has been temporarily suspended), Joe begins to find himself becoming very popular around the office for his bravery. Meg and Natalie, however, do not feel fighting McKinney will solve anything, and both attempt to tell Joe as much, to no avail. Joe seeks out the aid of an ex B movie star-turned-martial arts instructor named Chuck Scarett to teach him to defend himself. Things seem to finally be going right for Joe, as he has begun to see Meg and has even been given a promotion at work he had been hoping for.

When Meg realizes Jeremy, a colleague she works closely with for the company (who also happens to be attracted to her), only gave Joe a non-existing position at the office to prevent him from suing the company, she resigns in fear that she might one day have to demote or even fire Joe. Meg again tries to persuade Joe not to fight McKinney, and finally gives him an ultimatum: if he does not call off the fight with McKinney, their relationship is over.

The day of the fight, Joe makes his way to the way to the school where the brawl is to take place. However, he ultimately realizes he doesn't need to fight to prove his self worth to himself or anybody else, and it is not worth the price he would have to pay. When Joe tells McKinney and his other co-workers the fight is off, McKinney offers him an apology, which Joe accepts. Joe then goes and reconciles with Meg.

== Cast ==
- Tim Allen as Joe Scheffer, Natalie's father and the film's main protagonist
- Julie Bowen as Meg Harper, the Wellness Coordinator at STARKe Pharmaceuticals, and Joe's romantic interest
- Kelly Lynch as Callie Scheffer, Joe's ex-wife and Natalie's mother
- Greg Germann as Jeremy, an executive at STARKe Pharmaceuticals, who is also romantically interested in Meg
- Hayden Panettiere as Natalie Scheffer, Joe and Callie's daughter
- Patrick Warburton as Mark McKinney, an employee at STARKe Pharmaceuticals and the film's main antagonist
- Jim Belushi as Chuck Scarett, Joe's martial arts instructor and personal confidant
- Ken Marino as Rick Raglow, Callie's boyfriend
- Wolfgang Bodison as Cade Raymond, a co-worker who befriends Joe after he decides to take on McKinney
- Cristi Conaway as Abby Manheim, one of Joe's co-workers at STARKe Pharmaceuticals
- Robert Joy as Pat Chilcutt, the head of Joe's department at STARKe Pharmaceuticals
- Tina Lifford as Cassandra Taylor, a counselor at Natalie's school
- Jesse Ventura as himself

== Production ==
=== Development ===
John Scott Shepherd, who wrote the film's script, had previous experience in advertising as a film and video producer. Shepherd was inspired to write a screenplay about those experiences and the people who have to work behind the scenes in corporate America. "It occurred to me that we all expect to be special, if not famous," recalled Shepherd. The screenplay caught the attention of Kopelson Entertainment executive Matthew Gross, who first read the script while working on a television pilot with Shepherd. Gross passed the script on to his bosses, Anne and Arnold Kopelson, who gave Gross full support with the project.

The role of Joe Scheffer was initially offered to Jim Carrey, but he decided to join the 2001 film The Majestic instead. The screenplay's balance of comedy and drama intrigued actor Tim Allen, known for the television series Home Improvement and such films as Galaxy Quest (1999) and The Santa Clause (1994). Allen was searching for a project that was more than just broad comedy, and felt Joe Somebody would allow him to exhibit his comedic and dramatic skills. Of the script, Allen noted, "the story has a lot of heart to it, and an emotion that I really love." Producer Brian Reilly, who partners with Allen on his films, commented that "Tim's previous roles did not have the kind of emotional truth or intimacy on screen called for by Joe Somebody. Tim has now reached a time in his life when it's right for him to do a film with rich and shaded characters." With Allen on board, the studio executives began to search for a director for the film. After reading the script and discussing the details with Allen, Reilly, and numerous studio executives, John Pasquin, who had worked with Allen on Home Improvement, Jungle 2 Jungle (1997), and The Santa Clause, agreed to direct.

=== Filming ===
Filming began on April 9, 2001. The entire film was shot in Minnesota, with a majority of the shoot divided between the twin cities of Minneapolis and St. Paul. Screenwriter Shepherd spent many years working in the Twin Cities, becoming very familiar with the area in the process. Gross reflected on the city: "Minneapolis is a major player in this film, which can be seen in the cast, the background players and the locations. It was written for the city." The film was shot in fifty-four days on over thirty locations. Joe Scheffer's workplace was shot at Waterford Towers in Plymouth, Minnesota. Production designer Jackson De Govia transformed the fourth floor of the New Age office building into a drop ceiling corporate environment, which serves as a community to its employees. The Club 13 scenes were filmed at the Grand Hotel Minneapolis, while the karaoke scenes were shot at Grumpy's Bar & Grill, both in Minneapolis. The scenes of Tim Allen and Patrick Warburton racing their shopping carts were shot at the Target store in North St. Paul. The scenes taking place at Scarett's gym were filmed in the city of Richfield. The final playground scene was shot at Central Lutheran School in Saint Paul. Other scenes were shot in the cities of Crystal and St. Paul.

There was originally to be a title sequence of a number office workers getting to know the corporate structure. For timing purposes, the title sequence was instead spread over the film's first two scenes. The young girls in the "Bring Your Daughter To Work Day" video Joe can be seen working on in the beginning of the film were all daughters of various film crew members. The original fight between Joe and Mark was shot over two days in Minneapolis, which made it somewhat difficult to match up the colors in the processing stage of editing during post-production. Halfway through the shooting of the martial arts scenes, Tim Allen's arms became painfully bruised. Due to his injuries, Allen began to wear pads on his arms, which is why he is seen wearing them during training from the middle of the film on. Shooting finished on June 16, 2001.

== Release ==
=== Box office ===
Joe Somebody opened on December 21, 2001, ranking number ten at the box office, and earning $3,553,725 in its opening weekend in 2,506 theaters. Outside of the United States, the film was most successful in Mexico, grossing a total of $917,266 in box office sales. Joe Somebody went on to gross $22.7 million in the U.S. box office and $1.7 million in foreign countries, totaling $24.5 million in box office sales. Most of the blame for the film's disappointing returns could be attributed to three blockbuster films in theaters at the time: Harry Potter and the Sorcerer's Stone, The Lord of the Rings: The Fellowship of the Ring, and Ocean's Eleven.

=== Home media ===
The film was released to home video in the United States on August 20, 2002. Features on the DVD release include a commentary track featuring director John Pasquin and producer Brian Reilly, a fight choreography featurette, four deleted scenes with optional commentary, and the film's theatrical trailer.

== Reception ==
=== Critical response ===
On the review aggregator website Rotten Tomatoes, 21% of 85 critics' reviews are positive, with an average rating of 4.2/10. The website's consensus reads: "Amiable, but extremely lightweight and predictable." Metacritic, which uses a weighted average, assigned the film a score of 42 out of 100, based on 21 critics, indicating "mixed or average" reviews.

Joe Somebody received a two-and-a-half star rating from the Allmovie film review website.

Scott Foundas at Variety calls the film "pleasant," and gives much credit to director Pasquin. Although Foundas refers to the screenplay as "bland," he states that Pasquin has a "deft touch" when working with the material. Foundas also gives high marks to Allen's work in the picture, calling his presence the "pic's winningest asset." Steve Simels at TV Guide writes that the film "has genuine wit and pathos," some well drawn characters, "and a couple of sly comic performances." However, Simels did state that "none of these virtues can completely compensate for the film's utterly conventional message of uplift." Simels gave praise to some of the lead performances, crediting Greg Germann in particular for nearly stealing the film, calling his portrayal "truly a marvel to behold." Lisa Schwarzbaum from Entertainment Weekly called the film a "standard-transmission vehicle;" she gives credit, however, to star Allen's performance, saying that the character he plays in the film "just so happens to be the kind of average-Joe character that continues to make Allen such a tidy, non-Joe bundle."

Carla Meyer of the San Francisco Chronicle believed the film to be "an odd picture, a rumination on depression and self-discovery that's couched as an office comedy." Although Meyer said that the film is "never truly funny or insightful," she did give the picture some credit, stating that "the movie works intermittently by digging a little deeper than you might expect." Meyer also approved of the performances of Allen, Belushi, and Warburton. Roger Ebert of the Chicago Sun-Times gave the film one-and-a-half stars out of four likening it to "an afterschool special, with grownups cast in the kids' roles." Ebert also called the film "crashingly obvious," later remarking that the audience is "faced with the dismal prospect of being denied a climax, which, if it occurred, would be just as predictable as its substitute."

=== Awards and nominations ===
Year	Organization	Award	Result
2002	Young Artist Awards	Best Performance in a Feature Film (Leading Young Actress) — Hayden Panettiere	Nominated
