= Phil Solomon =

Philip or Phil Solomon may refer to:

- Phil Solomon (filmmaker) (1954-2019), American experimental filmmaker
- Phil Solomon (music executive) (1924–2011), Northern Irish music executive and businessman
- Philip Solomon (1926–2002), American psychiatrist
- Philip Solomon (medium) (born 1959), British spiritualist medium
