= John Pasquin =

American film director (born 1944)

- Born: November 30, 1944 (age 81); Houston, Texas, U.S.
- Education: Beloit College (BA); Carnegie Mellon University (MFA)
- Occupations: Film director, theatre director, television director, television producer. Asst. Professor Drama Department, Carnegie-Mellon University
- Years active: 1982–present
- Spouse: JoBeth Williams (m. 1982)
- Children: 3

John Pasquin (born November 30, 1944) is an American director of film, television and theatre.

== Career ==
An alumnus of Beloit College and Carnegie Mellon University, Pasquin began directing Broadway theatre plays in the early 1980s. He moved on to television, directing episodes of the series Family Ties, Growing Pains, Alice and Newhart. In addition to directing a season 1 episode of Roseanne, he directed the entire second season, as well as the first four episodes from the revived tenth season. His producing debut came in 1991 with the sitcom Home Improvement starring Tim Allen, also directing a number of episodes of the series. He also directed Allen in the films The Santa Clause (1994), also his feature film directing debut, Jungle 2 Jungle (1997) and Joe Somebody (2001). In 2005, he directed Miss Congeniality 2: Armed and Fabulous, the sequel to the 2000 film Miss Congeniality.

Pasquin's other television directing credits include Thirtysomething, L.A. Law, George Lopez, Freddie, Accidentally on Purpose, Rules of Engagement and Better with You. In 2011, he worked with Tim Allen again, directing and producing the sitcom Last Man Standing and again in 2025 for Shifting Gears.

== Personal life ==
Pasquin is married to actress JoBeth Williams; they have two sons, Will and Nick. He also has a daughter, Sarah, from a previous marriage.

== Filmography ==
=== Film ===
Director

- The Santa Clause (1994)
- Jungle 2 Jungle (1997)
- Joe Somebody (2001)
- Miss Congeniality 2: Armed and Fabulous (2005)

Acting roles

Year	Title	Role
1994	The Santa Clause	Santa #6
1997	Jungle 2 Jungle	Bearded Man in Times Square

=== Television ===
Year	Title	Director	Producer	Notes
1980–81	Texas	Yes		17 episodes
1980–82	Another World	Yes		2 episodes
1982	Gimme a Break!	Yes		Episode "Brother Ed and the Hooker"
1982–84	Alice	Yes		12 episodes
1983–87	Family Ties	Yes		13 episodes
1984	Brothers	Yes		Episode "Fools Russian"
1984	It's Your Move	Yes		2 episodes
1984–85	Double Trouble	Yes		3 episodes
1985	Sara	Yes		5 episodes
1985	Hometown	Yes		Episode "Divorce Party"
1985	Growing Pains	Yes		5 episodes
1985–86	Newhart	Yes		6 episodes
1986	Heart of the City	Yes		"A Rough Ride of Life's Merry-Go-Round"
1986–88	The Cavanaughs	Yes		3 episodes
1987	Thirtysomething	Yes		2 episodes
1987–88	CBS Summer Playhouse	Yes		2 episodes
1987–89	L.A. Law	Yes		4 episodes
1988	Raising Miranda	Yes		"Marcine Shoplifts"
1989–2018	Roseanne	Yes	Yes	Director (29 episodes); Co-Executive Producer (9 episodes)
1990	Going Places	Yes		Episode "Curse of the Video"
1991	My Life and Times	Yes		Episode "Our Wedding"
1991–99	Home Improvement	Yes	Yes	Director (39 episodes); Producer (37 episodes)
1996	Buddies	Yes	Yes	Director (7 episodes); Producer (6 episodes)
1997	Soul Man	Yes	Yes	Director (6 episodes); Producer (2 episodes)
1999	Payne	Yes		Episode "Gossip Checks in and a Cat Checks Out"
2003–04	George Lopez	Yes	Yes	Director (17 episodes); Producer (14 episodes)
2005–06	Freddie	Yes	Yes	(7 episodes)
2009	Accidentally on Purpose	Yes		2 episodes
2010	Rules of Engagement	Yes		6 episodes
2010	Better with You	Yes		3 episodes
2011–18	Last Man Standing	Yes	Yes	Director (73 episodes); Producer (23 episodes); Co-Executive Producer (29 episodes)
2012	Malibu Country	Yes	Yes	Episode "Pilot"
2014–15	Cristela	Yes		6 episodes
2025-2026	Shifting Gears	Yes	Yes	Director (11 episodes); Executive Producer (20 episodes)

TV movies

- Heart and Soul (1988)
- Out on the Edge (1989)
- Don't Touch My Daughter (1991)
- Carson's Vertical Suburbia (1998)
- The First Gentleman (1999)
- America's Most Terrible Things (2002)
- The Dan Show (2003)
- Playing Chicken (2007)
- Fourplay (2008)

== Accolades ==
Year	Association	Category	Title	Result	Ref.
1990	Directors Guild of America	Outstanding Directorial Achievement in Dramatic Series — Night (for episode "To Live and Diet in L.A.")	L.A. Law	Nominated	
1989	Primetime Emmy Awards	Outstanding Directing in a Drama Series (for episode "To Live and Diet in L.A.)	L.A. Law	Nominated	
1992	Primetime Emmy Awards	Outstanding Comedy Series (as producer)	Home Improvement	Nominated	
1993	Primetime Emmy Awards	Outstanding Comedy Series (as producer)	Home Improvement	Nominated	
