= Grave Secrets: The Legacy of Hilltop Drive =

1992 American television film by John Patterson

- Genre: Horror
- Based on: The Black Hope Horror by: Ben Williams; Jean Williams; John Bruce Shoemaker
- Teleplay by: Gregory Goodell
- Directed by: John Patterson
- Starring: Patty Duke; David Selby; Kiersten Warren; Blake Clark; Kelly Rowan; David Soul
- Music by: Patrick Williams
- Country of origin: United States
- Original language: English

Production
- Executive producer: Freyda Rothstein
- Cinematography: Shelly Johnson
- Editor: Edward M. Abroms
- Running time: 97 minutes
- Production companies: Freyda Rothstein Productions; Hearst Entertainment

Original release
- Network: CBS
- Release: March 3, 1992

Grave Secrets: The Legacy of Hilltop Drive is a 1992 American horror television film directed by John Patterson that is supposedly based on real events. It stars Patty Duke, David Selby and David Soul.

== Plot ==
A family buys a home in a new housing development. They soon discover the house was built on the old "Freedomtown" African-American graveyard, though the developers deny the graveyard exists. The family sets out to prove otherwise while the body count grows. Jean soon uncovers the reality behind their 'dream house.'

== Cast ==
The cast involves some well known actors and actresses:

- Patty Duke - Jean Williams
- David Selby - Shag Williams
- Kiersten Warren - Tina Williams
- Blake Clark - W.D. Marshall
- Kelly Rowan - Gayla Williams
- Jonelle Allen - Madeline Garrick
- Dakin Matthews - Attorney
- Jon Maynard Pennell - Darryl
- Terry Davis - Judith Haney
- Kimberly Cullum - Carli
- David Soul - Sam Haney
- Maggie Roswell - Rita Marshall
- Rick Fitts - Robert Garrick
- James Lashly - Stetson
- Frances Bay - Iva Ruth McKinney
- George Solomon - Dr. Morinski
- Jay Brooks - Blind Man
- Julius Harris - Elderly Farmer
- Jill Andre - Woman at Barbecue
- James Gallery - Man at Barbecue
- Jim Raymond - Kurt Lang
- Don Fischer - Utility Worker
- Roger Scott - Runyon
- Dennis Hayden - Electrician
- Muriel Minot - Neighbor
- Doug Stevenson - Crane Operator
- David Hayman - Plumber
- Teresa Lee - Cheerleader
- Bradley Altman - Freckled Kid

== Production ==
The film is based on the events detailed by Jean and Ben "Shag" Williams in their book The Black Hope Horror, in which they state that they experienced inexplicable supernatural events while residing in their Texas home. The film's screenwriter and producer stayed with the couple for three and a half days. During this time they reassured the Williamses that the story would not be sensationalized. Patty Duke and David Selby were brought in to portray the Williamses.

== Reception ==
The La Crosse Tribune criticized Grave Secrets as a "two hour 'Unexplained Mysteries' using name actors" and that "Those who refuse to believe in supernatural forces shouldn't waste a minute, however, except to punch holes in the theories of supernatural manifestations." Joe Benson of the News-Pilot was also critical, calling it a "great example in how NOT to make a horror film" and cited the direction and writing as negatives. In a mostly negative review, Rick Sherwood of The Hollywood Reporter wrote, "It's curious how such big-name TV stars could get involved in a film so devoid of originality." He praised David Selby and Patty Duke for their convincing portrayals as the father and mother.

== See also ==
- List of ghost films
