= Kenneth Atchity =

American producer, reviewer and author (1944–2026)

Kenneth John Atchity
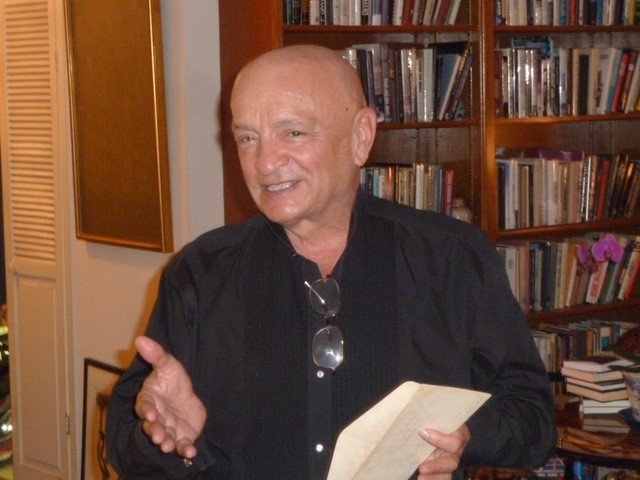
- Atchity in 2017
- Born: January 16, 1944; Eunice, Louisiana, U.S.
- Died: October 19, 2026 (aged 82); Los Angeles, California, U.S.
- Education: Georgetown University; Yale University
- Occupations: Author, academic, producer, literary manager, and editor

Kenneth John Atchity (January 16, 1944 – October 19, 2026) was an American producer, author, columnist, book reviewer and professor of comparative literature.

== Academic career ==
After receiving a Jesuit education from Rockhurst High School and Georgetown University, where he was a member of the Philodemic Society and received an Ignatian Scholarship to study Greek and Latin classics, Atchity received a Woodrow Wilson Fellowship to Yale and received his MPhil in Theater History and his Ph.D. Comparative Literature from Yale. His dissertation, Homer's Iliad: The Shield of Memory, was awarded the John Addison Porter Prize.

Atchity went on to become a professor of literature and classics at Occidental College, where he served as the chairman of the comparative literature department, distinguished instructor at UCLA's Writers Program, and as Fulbright Professor of American studies to the University of Bologna. During his teaching career, he was a frequent columnist for The Los Angeles Times Book Review.

His articles on English and American literature have appeared in the following publications: American Quarterly, Comparative Literature Studies, Kenyon Review, Philological Quarterly; on Italian literature in Italian Quarterly, Spicilegio Moderno.

In addition to the Los Angeles Times Book Review, his reviews have appeared in Folio, The Huffington Post, New Haven Register, San Francisco Chronicle, St. Louis Post-Dispatch, and The Washington Post.

== Entertainment career ==
In 1976, Atchity founded L/A House, Inc., a consulting, translation, book, television, film development, and production company whose clients included the Getty Museum and the US Postal Service. L/A House began by extending Atchity's teaching of creative writing to manuscript consultation and soon moved on to publishing with the production of Follies, a magazine covering creativity, and CQ: Contemporary Quarterly; Poetry and Art of which he was editor. In the 1980s L/A House moved into television, with a syndicated television pilot of BreakThrough! of which Atchity was executive producer and co-writer.

In 1985, L/A House began development of a set of video/TV romance film projects entitled Shades of Love, which became 16 full-length films, produced in 1986–87 with Atchity as executive producer, that aired throughout the world, distributed by Lorimar, Astral-Bellevue-Pathe, Manson International, and Warner Brothers International, nominated for Canada's Gemini Award; in the U.S. they premiered on Cinemax-HBO.

In 1989, he sold L/A House and founded AEI (Atchity Editorial/Entertainment International), a literary management and motion picture production company. Atchity sold Steve Alten’s Meg to Bantam-Doubleday at auction in a $2.2M deal; and then to Disney, partnered with Zide-Perry, for $1.2 (later, to Newline Pictures for a similar price). Incorporated in 1996, its name was changed to Atchity Entertainment International, Inc. in 2005.

In 1996, he founded The Writer's Lifeline (incorporated in 2002). In 2006, he and manager-partner Fred Griffin (of Houston's Griffin Partners), along with a group of investors from Louisiana and Texas, acquired The Louisiana Wave Studio, LLC in Shreveport, Louisiana from Walt Disney Productions. The LWS is the only tank specifically designed to make waves for motion pictures in North America. Films produced at the LWS include The Guardian, Mayday—Bering Sea, Shark Night 3D, Streets of Blood, and I Love You, Philip Morris; along with numerous government and industrial films.

In 2011, Atchity was nominated for an Emmy along with his producing partner Chi-Li Wong for producing The Kennedy Detail (Discovery) based on their clients' Jerry Blaine and Lisa McCubbin's New York Times bestselling book by the same title published by Gallery/Simon & Schuster in 2010.

AEI's films produced with his long-time business and producing partner Chi-Li Wong include Joe Somebody (Tim Allen, Julie Bowen), Life Or Something Like It (Angelina Jolie, Edward Burns), The MEG (Jason Statham), and MEG 2:The Trench (Jason Statham)

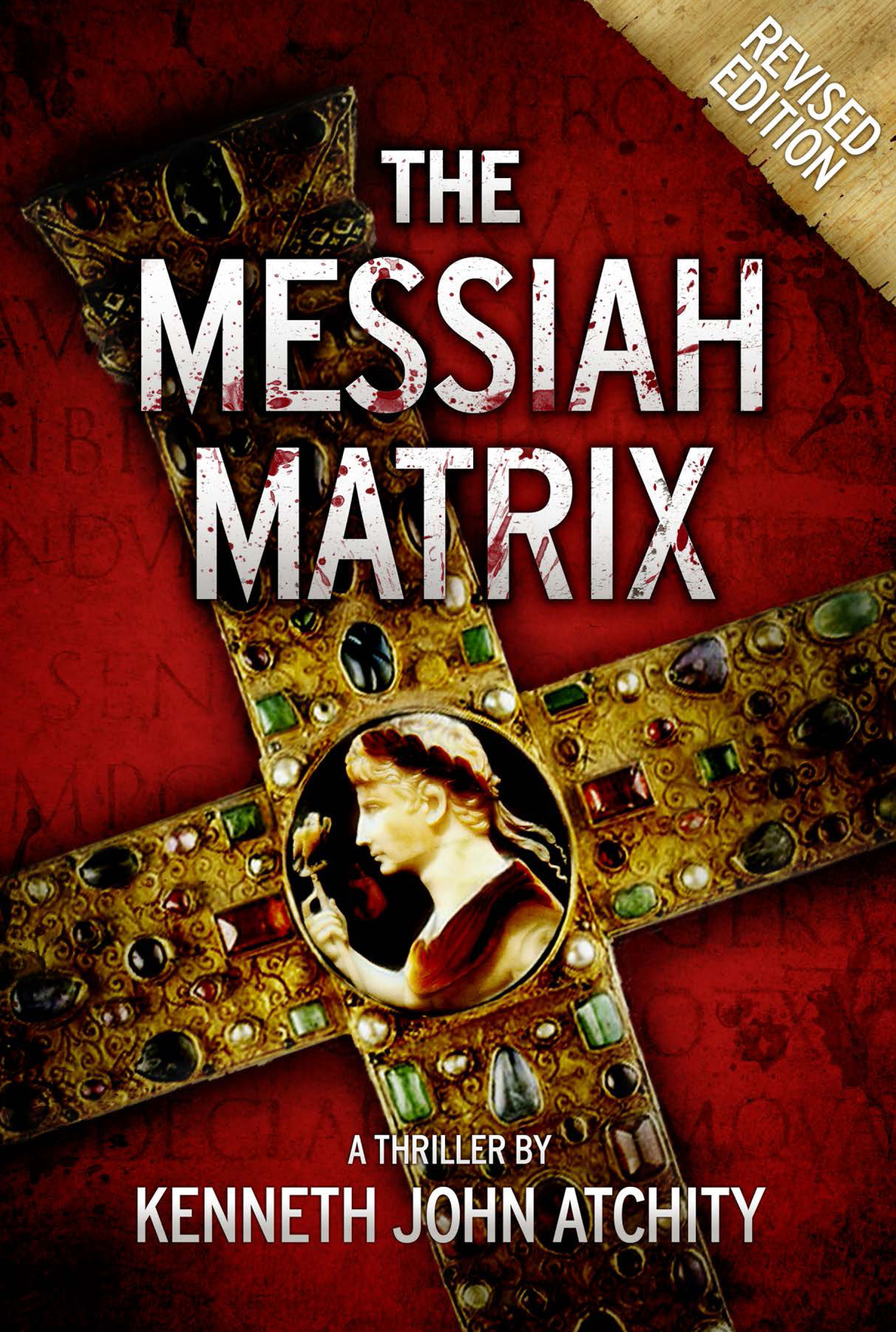

In 2010, Atchity also founded Atchity Productions and Story Merchant.

== The Messiah Matrix ==
In 2012, Atchity published his completion of William Diehl's Seven Ways to Die and his first solo novel, The Messiah Matrix. The novel centers on a fictional marine archaeological find of a rare Herodian coin honoring Augustus. A romantic interest develops between the American archaeologist who has discovered the coin, and a young Jesuit priest intrigued by its implications. A powerful faction of the Jesuits has been preparing to announce that the fictional character Jesus of Nazareth was inspired by the life of Caesar Augustus, and the coin is crucial evidence for their claim.

== Personal life and death ==
Kenneth Atchity was born in Eunice, Louisiana, the son of Fred J. and Myrza (née Aguillard) Atchity.

He was married to documentary filmmaker and former NHK producer Kayoko Mitsumatsu. He had two children.

Atchity died of kidney failure in Los Angeles on October 19, 2026, at the age of 82.

== Production filmography ==
- The Meg (Jason Statham) (2018) (Warner Brothers)
- Angels in the Snow (Kristy Swanson) (2015) (UpTV "Most watched" movie).
- 14 Days with Alzheimer's (Documentary Short) (film festivals)
- Erased (Aaron Eckhart) (2012)
- Hysteria (Maggie Gyllenhaal, Rupert Everett) (2011)
- The Lost Valentine (Betty White, Jennifer Love Hewitt) (2011) (Hallmark Hall of Fame/CBS)
- The Kennedy Detail (narrated by Martin Sheen) (2010) (Sunday Night Special) (Discovery)
- Gospel Hill (Danny Glover, Angela Bassett) (2008) (Fox)
- The Madam's Family (Ellen Burstyn, Annabella Sciorra) (2004) (CBS)
- Life or Something Like It (Angelina Jolie, Edward Burns) (2002) (Fox)
- Joe Somebody (Tim Allen) (2001) (Fox)
- Stalker: Shadow of Obsession (Veronica Hamel, Jonathan Banks) (1994) (NBC)
- Falling Over Backwards (Saul Rubinek) (1990) (Astral)
- Amityville 4: The Evil Escapes (Patty Duke) (1989) (NBC)
- Shades of Love Romance TV movie series (1987–1988) (Cinemax/HBO), Genie Award

== Books by Atchity ==
- Sell Your Story to Hollywood: Writers Guide to the Business of Show Business (Story Merchant Books) (2017); ISBN 9780996990875
- The Meander Tile of Lisa Greco (Romance of Mythic Identity Book 2) (as Andrea Aguillard) (Story Merchant Books) (2017) ISBN 9780998162898
- The Twaesum Aik of Brae MacKenzie (A Romance of Mythic Identity Book 1) (as Andrea Aguillard) (Story Merchant Books) (2016) ISBN 9780996990844
- The Messiah Matrix (Imprimatur Britannica/Story Merchant Books) (2012); ISBN 9780957218901
- How to Quit Your Day Job and Live Out Your Dreams (Skyhorse Publishing) (2012); ISBN 9781616086862
- Seven Ways to Die (with William Diehl) (AEI/Story Merchant Books) (2012); ISBN 9780615608068
- How to Publish Your Novel (SquareOne) (2005);
- How to Escape Lifetime Security and Pursue Your Impossible Dream: A Guide to Transforming Your Career (Helios) (2004); revision of The Mercury Transition, below.
- Writing Treatments That Sell: How to Create and Market Your Story Ideas to the Motion Picture and TV Industry (with Chi-Li Wong) (Holt/Owl Books; Quality Paperbacks, Writers Digest Book Club) (Second Edition, 2003);
- The Classical Roman Reader (Holt 1997); (Oxford University Press 1998);Independent Publisher Book Awards, 2017
- The Classical Greek Reader (Holt, 1996); (Oxford University Press, 1998);
- The Renaissance Reader (HarperCollins, 1996); (Harper paperback, 1997). ISBN 9780062701299
- Cajun Household Wisdom (Longmeadow Press, 1995). ISBN 9780681007727
- The Mercury Transition: How to Escape Lifetime Security to Live Your Impossible Dream (Longmeadow Press, 1994).
- (editor) Homer: Critical Essays, including essays "Greek Princes and Aegean Princesses: The Role of Women in the Homeric Poems" (with E.J.W. Barber) and "Andromache's Headdress" (G. K. Hall) (1987);
- A Writer's Time: A Guide to the Creative Process, from Vision through Revision (W.W. Norton) (1986) (Quality Paperbacks, Book of the Month Club, Writer's Digest Book Club) (David & Charles paperback, United Kingdom, as Writing: Make the Most of Your Time New revised and expanded edition, A Writer's Time: Making Time to Write (1995) Christopher Lehmann-Haupt, in The New York Times review, called AWT "the best recent book on writing"; ISBN 0-393-31263-1
- Sleeping with an Elephant: Selected Poems, 1965–1976 (Valkyrie Press)(1978);
- Homer's Iliad: The Shield of Memory Introduction by John Gardner (Southern Illinois University Press) (1978);
- (co-editor and contributor) Italian Literature: Roots & Branches including his essay, "Dante's Purgatorio: The Poem Reveals Itself" (Yale University Press) (1976);
- In Praise of Love Libretto for choral symphony premiered at Lincoln Center (1974).
- (editor) Eterne in Mutabilitie: The Unity of the Faerie Queene (Archon) (1972).

== Memberships ==
- American Comparative Literature Association
- The Academy of Television Arts & Sciences
- The Producers Guild of America
- Academy of American Poets
