= Amityville: The Final Chapter =

Third installment of the Amityville book series

- Author: John G. Jones
- Language: English
- Series: The Amityville Horror
- Genre: Horror
- Publication date: 1985
- Publication place: United States
- Pages: 272
- ISBN: 978-0-515-07824-4
- OCLC: 11570239
- Preceded by: The Amityville Horror Part II
- Followed by: Amityville: The Evil Escapes

Amityville: The Final Chapter is a 1985 horror fiction book and the third installment of the Amityville book series written by John G. Jones. Most of the book is believed to be fiction unrelated to the actual claims of the Lutz family. Amityville: The Final Chapter was intended to be the final book in the series. However after the success of this book an entirely fictional Amityville sequel was created titled Amityville: The Evil Escapes.

== Plot ==
As the Lutz family flies around the world on a publicity tour they are horrified to discover the Entity continues to haunt them wherever they go.
