= Shifting Gears (TV series) =

American television sitcom

- Genre: Sitcom
- Created by: Julie Thacker Scully; Mike Scully
- Showrunner: Michelle Nader
- Starring: Tim Allen; Kat Dennings; Seann William Scott; Daryl "Chill" Mitchell; Maxwell Simkins; Barrett Margolis
- Music by: Tony Kanal
- Country of origin: United States
- Original language: English
- No. of seasons: 2
- No. of episodes: 23

Production
- Executive producers: John Pasquin; Richard Baker; Rick Messina; Marty Adelstein; Becky Clements; Tim Allen; John Amodeo; Julie Thacker Scully; Mike Scully; Michelle Nader; Bob Daily; Jim Patterson
- Producers: Nicole Markel McMillan; Kat Dennings; Anastasia Stanecki
- Cinematography: Donald A. Morgan
- Editors: Pamela Marshall; Scott Ashby
- Production companies: Shaky Gun Productions; Lost Marbles; 20th Television

Original release
- Network: ABC
- Release: January 8, 2025 – present

Shifting Gears is an American television sitcom created by Julie Thacker Scully and Mike Scully for ABC through 20th Television. The series stars Tim Allen, Kat Dennings, Seann William Scott, Daryl "Chill" Mitchell, Maxwell Simkins, and Barrett Margolis.

It premiered on ABC on January 8, 2025. In April 2025, ABC renewed the series for a second season, which premiered on October 1, 2025. In April 2026, ABC renewed the series for a third season which is scheduled to premiere on January 6, 2027.

== Premise ==
Still mourning the death of his wife, a gruff widower who runs an auto customization shop reluctantly takes in his estranged (and newly divorced) daughter, who moves in with his two grandchildren.

== Cast and characters ==
=== Main cast ===
- Tim Allen as Matt Parker, a widower who owns Parker Customs, an auto customization shop
- Kat Dennings as Riley Parker, Matt's daughter
- Seann William Scott as Gabriel, a technician at Matt's shop who had a crush on Riley for years
- Daryl Mitchell as Stitch, a technician at Matt's shop who specializes in seats and interiors
- Maxwell Simkins as Carter Parker, Riley's son
- Barrett Margolis as Georgia Parker, Riley's daughter

=== Recurring ===
- Cynthia Quiles as Frankie
- Jenna Elfman as Eve Drake, (Note: Elfman is credited as "Special Guest Star" but is a recurring cast member.) Riley's former boss and Matt's girlfriend
- Lucas Neff as Jimmy, Riley's ex-husband who is a struggling musician
- Nancy Travis as Charlotte Miller, a widow who befriends Matt
- Carson Fagerbakke as Amelie, Gabriel's new girlfriend
- Mookie Betts as Mookie, a customer at Parker Customs
- Jesse Williams as Andy, Riley's friend who begins dating her

=== Guest stars ===
- Brenda Song as Caitlyn Baker, Riley's high school friend and Assistant school principal at Carter's school
- Bianca Lopez as Miss Esposito, Georgia's teacher
- Felipe Esparza as Bob, one of Matt's co-workers
- Chelsea London Lloyd as Emma Foster, Matt and Riley's Therapist
- Nina Concepción as Miss Doss, a Teacher
- Kayla Melikian as Layla, Georgia's friend
- Liam Martinez as Owen
- Jay Leno as Himself
- Tate Birchmore as Ethan, Carter's friend
- Dylan Kento Curtis as Kyle, Carter's friend
- Isabella Feliciana as Lily Martinez, Carter's girlfriend
- Patricia Richardson as Judith, a Grief group member #1
- Debbe Dunning as April, a Grief group member #2
- Richard Karn as Roger, a Grief group member #3
- Lilly Singh as Jen, Riley's Friend
- Ayla Manji as Olivia, Jen's daughter
- Gabriel Iglesias as Fluffy, a customer at Parker Customs
- Lori Greiner as Herself
- Steph Tolev as Chris, an Exterminator
- Andy Ridings as Tom, Riley's dater
- Al Madrigal as Keith Rodriguez, a customer at Parker Customs
- Gilbert Aguirre as Rory
- Mason Cook as River
- LaNisa Renee Frederick as Becca
- Celeste Pechous as Judy
- Pamela Adlon as Molly, Gabriel's mother
- Traci Belushi as Helen
- Michael Osborne as John
- Dwayne Colbert as Peter
- Jim Rash as Damien
- Tuc Watkins as Pete Holterman, Matt's high school friend
- Maria Bamford as Amy
- Luke Macfarlane as Sam Parker, Matt's military hero son
- Angela Kinsey as Lynn, Matt's date
- Beth Behrs as Dr. Johnson

== Episodes ==
=== Series overview ===
| Season | Episodes | Originally released | |
| Season | Episodes | First released | Last released |
|---|---|---|---|
| 1 | 10 | January 8, 2025 | March 19, 2025 |
| 2 | 13 | October 1, 2025 | February 4, 2026 |

=== Season 1 (2025) ===
| No. overall | No. in season | Title | Directed by | Written by | Original release date | Prod. code | U.S. viewers (millions) |
|---|---|---|---|---|---|---|---|
| 1 | 1 | "Restoration" | John Pasquin | Julie Thacker Scully & Mike Scully | January 8, 2025 | 1ZHF01 | 6.10 |
| 2 | 2 | "Accommodations" | John Pasquin | Bob Daily | January 15, 2025 | 1ZHF03 | 4.56 |
| 3 | 3 | "Job" | John Pasquin | Jim Patterson | January 22, 2025 | 1ZHF02 | 4.61 |
| 4 | 4 | "Grief" | Danielle Fishel | Morgan Murphy | January 29, 2025 | 1ZHF04 | 4.28 |
| 5 | 5 | "Jimmy" | Victor Gonzalez | Kevin Hench | February 5, 2025 | 1ZHF05 | 4.32 |
| 6 | 6 | "Valentine's" | John Pasquin | Feraz Ozel | February 12, 2025 | 1ZHF06 | 4.53 |
| 7 | 7 | "Picnic" | John Pasquin | Michelle Nader & Saladin K. Patterson | February 26, 2025 | 1ZHF07 | 3.44 |
| 8 | 8 | "Career" | John Pasquin | Maya Ayele & Clea DeCrane | March 5, 2025 | 1ZHF08 | 3.71 |
| 9 | 9 | "Gummies" | Victor Gonzalez | Bob Daily | March 12, 2025 | 1ZHF09 | 3.82 |
| 10 | 10 | "Kiss" | John Pasquin | Teleplay by : Jim Patterson; Story by : Ekaterina Vladimirova | March 19, 2025 | 1ZHF10 | 3.77 |

=== Season 2 (2025–26) ===
| No. overall | No. in season | Title | Directed by | Written by | Original release date | Prod. code | U.S. viewers (millions) |
|---|---|---|---|---|---|---|---|
| 11 | 1 | "Secret" | John Pasquin | Bob Daily | October 1, 2025 | 2ZHF01 | 4.37 |
| 12 | 2 | "Date" | Victor Gonzalez | Lesley Wake Webster | October 8, 2025 | 2ZHF02 | 3.68 |
| 13 | 3 | "Passion" | John Pasquin | Morgan Murphy | October 15, 2025 | 2ZHF03 | 3.89 |
| 14 | 4 | "Danger" | Victor Gonzalez | Dan Levy | October 22, 2025 | 2ZHF04 | 4.02 |
| 15 | 5 | "Scary" | Victor Gonzalez | Feraz Ozel | October 29, 2025 | 2ZHF05 | 3.68 |
| 16 | 6 | "Loyalty" | John Pasquin | Justin Mooney | November 5, 2025 | 2ZHF06 | 3.60 |
| 17 | 7 | "License" | Jody Margolin Hahn | Chris Martin & Hanna Stanbridge | December 3, 2025 | 2ZHF07 | N/A |
| 18 | 8 | "Nutcracker" | Anthony Rich | Mike Carreon | December 10, 2025 | 2ZHF08 | N/A |
| 19 | 9 | "Dog" | Victor Gonzalez | Bob Daily | January 7, 2026 | 2ZHF09 | N/A |
| 20 | 10 | "Friend" | John Pasquin | Jim Patterson & Kevin Hench | January 14, 2026 | 2ZHF10 | N/A |
| 21 | 11 | "Toys" | Victor Gonzalez | Teleplay by : Lesley Wake Webster; Story by : Alexa Silver | January 21, 2026 | 2ZHF11 | N/A |
| 22 | 12 | "Uncle Sam" | Victor Gonzalez | Bob Daily & Jim Patterson | January 28, 2026 | 2ZHF12 | N/A |
| 23 | 13 | "Surprise" | Anthony Rich | Michelle Nader & Ekaterina Vladimirova | February 4, 2026 | 2ZHF13 | N/A |

== Production ==
A pilot episode was ordered in March 2024 made by 20th Television and written by Mike Scully and Julie Thacker Scully. The project was given a series order by ABC in July 2024. It is from the studio 20th Television and starring Tim Allen and Kat Dennings. Mike Scully and Julie Thacker Scully were involved in the pilot but left the project. Allen executive produces with Marty Adelstein, Becky Clements, Richard Baker, Rick Messina and pilot director John Pasquin. Michelle Nader joined as showrunner and executive producer in September 2024. Dennings is also a producer. Jim Patterson, Bob Daily and John Amodeo also executive produce.

Seann William Scott joined the cast of the series in October 2024. Also in the cast for the series are Daryl "Chill" Mitchell, Maxwell Simkins and Barrett Margolis. In November 2024, Brenda Song was cast to guest star. In December 2024, Jenna Elfman joined the cast in a recurring role. In January 2025, Nancy Travis was cast in a guest star. In February 2025, Jay Leno joined the cast as a guest star. In August 2025, it was reported that Patricia Richardson, Richard Karn, and Debbe Dunning are set to appear as guest stars for the second season premiere episode while Lilly Singh is also set to guest star on an episode.

Shifting Gears is filmed at Walt Disney Studios in Burbank, California. On April 3, 2025, ABC renewed the series for a second season. On September 5, 2025, ABC ordered three more episodes for the second season, increasing the total number of episodes for the season from ten to thirteen. On September 9, 2025, Gabriel Iglesias and Lori Greiner were cast to guest star as themselves. On October 6, 2025, it was announced that Mookie Betts would make a guest appearance on the October 8, 2025 episode. On December 9, 2025, it was reported that Luke Macfarlane was cast to guest star. On April 30, 2026, the series was renewed for a third season.

== Release ==
Shifting Gears premiered on ABC on January 8, 2025. Its second season premiered on October 1, 2025. The third season is set to premiere on January 5, 2027. In Canada, the series aired on CTV Television Network. Shifting Gears is available for streaming on Hulu and Disney+, with each episode appearing the day after its broadcast premiere. As part of global licensing agreement between Disney Entertainment and Netflix, the first 2 seasons of the series is set to streaming on Netflix in the U.S. starting December 1, 2026 and worldwide starting January 2027.

== Reception ==
=== Critical response ===
The review aggregator website Rotten Tomatoes reported a 47% approval rating with an average rating of 3.3/10, based on 15 critic reviews. The website's critics consensus reads, "Shifting Gears has a formidable pair of sitcom stars in Tim Allen and Kat Dennings, but flavorless characters and flat jokes keep their new comedic vehicle stuck in neutral." Metacritic, which uses a weighted average, assigned a score of 51 out of 100 based on 13 critics, indicating "mixed or average" reviews.

=== Ratings ===
The premiere of Shifting Gears on January 8, 2025, set an audience record for ABC, amassing nearly 17 million multi-platform viewers in its first seven days across ABC, Hulu, Hulu on Disney+, and digital platforms. This marks a 173% increase over its same-day audience of 6.2 million. The episode also garnered around 12.5 million viewers without counting linear encores, still up 101% from the same-day audience, making it ABC's strongest series debut since The Conners in 2018 and the broadcaster's most-watched streaming debut to date. Shifting Gears opened its 2025–26 season on ABC with 4.37 million viewers for its initial broadcast on October 1. After a week of cross-platform viewing, including streaming on Hulu, Disney+, and DVR playback, the series' audience grew to 7.57 million, a 73% increase. Its adults 18–49 rating rose from 0.35 to 1.17, equivalent to roughly 1.59 million viewers in that demographic. Approximately 42% of the total audience over five weeks came from streaming, with the majority of the adults 18–49 rating derived from digital platforms. The Season 2 premiere of Shifting Gears attracted 7.57 million viewers in its first week, surpassing ABC's Abbott Elementary, which drew 6.64 million viewers for its premiere.

==== Season 1 ====
Viewership and ratings per episode of Shifting Gears
| No. | Title | Air date | Rating/share (18–49) | Viewers (millions) | DVR (18–49) | DVR viewers (millions) | Total (18–49) | Total viewers (millions) | Ref. |
|---|---|---|---|---|---|---|---|---|---|
| 1 | "Restoration" | January 8, 2025 | 0.7/8 | 6.10 | 0.2 | 1.28 | 0.8 | 7.38 | |
| 2 | "Accommodations" | January 15, 2025 | 0.4/5 | 4.56 | 0.2 | 1.59 | 0.6 | 6.15 | |
| 3 | "Job" | January 22, 2025 | 0.5/6 | 4.61 | 0.2 | 1.95 | 0.7 | 6.56 | |
| 4 | "Grief" | January 29, 2025 | 0.4/5 | 4.28 | 0.2 | 1.57 | 0.6 | 5.87 | |
| 5 | "Jimmy" | February 5, 2025 | 0.4/5 | 4.32 | 0.2 | 1.50 | 0.6 | 5.82 | |
| 6 | "Valentine's" | February 12, 2025 | 0.4/6 | 4.53 | 0.2 | 1.62 | 0.6 | 6.16 | |
| 7 | "Picnic" | February 26, 2025 | 0.3/4 | 3.44 | 0.2 | 1.60 | 0.5 | 5.05 | |
| 8 | "Career" | March 5, 2025 | 0.3/4 | 3.71 | 0.2 | 1.60 | 0.5 | 5.31 | |
| 9 | "Gummies" | March 12, 2025 | 0.3/5 | 3.82 | 0.2 | 1.52 | 0.5 | 5.35 | |
| 10 | "Kiss" | March 19, 2025 | 0.3/4 | 3.77 | 0.2 | 1.41 | 0.5 | 5.18 | |

==== Season 2 ====
Viewership and ratings per episode of Shifting Gears
| No. | Title | Air date | Rating/share (18–49) | Viewers (millions) | DVR (18–49) | DVR viewers (millions) | Total (18–49) | Total viewers (millions) | Ref. |
|---|---|---|---|---|---|---|---|---|---|
| 1 | "Secret" | October 1, 2025 | 0.4/5 | 4.37 | 0.2 | 1.58 | 0.5 | 5.95 | |
| 2 | "Date" | October 8, 2025 | 0.3/4 | 3.68 | 0.2 | 1.42 | 0.5 | 5.09 | |
| 3 | "Passion" | October 15, 2025 | 0.4/6 | 3.89 | 0.1 | 1.50 | 0.5 | 5.39 | |
| 4 | "Danger" | October 22, 2025 | 0.4/6 | 4.02 | 0.2 | 1.36 | 0.6 | 5.38 | |
| 5 | "Scary" | October 29, 2025 | 0.3/4 | 3.68 | 0.1 | 1.04 | 0.4 | 4.73 | |
| 6 | "Loyalty" | November 5, 2025 | 0.3/5 | 3.60 | 0.1 | 1.08 | 0.4 | 4.68 | |

=== Accolades ===
At the 5th Astra TV Awards, Tim Allen and Kat Dennings were nominated for Best Actor and Best Actress in a Comedy Series, respectively, while Shifting Gears was also nominated for Best Cast Ensemble in a Broadcast Network Comedy Series.
