= The Black Hope Horror =

1991 book by Ben and Jean Williams and John Bruce Shoemaker

- First edition hardback cover
- Author: Ben Williams, Jean Williams, John Bruce Shoemaker
- Language: English
- Publisher: William Morrow & Co
- Publication date: 1991
- Media type: Print (hardback, paperback)
- Pages: 224 pages
- ISBN: 0688051766 First edition hardback

The Black Hope Horror is a 1991 book co written by Ben and Jean Williams and John Bruce Shoemaker. In the book the Williams family describes paranormal events they state happened to them while living in a home in Crosby, Texas.

== Historical basis ==
In 1980 Ben and Jean Williams purchased a newly built home in a subdivision located in Crosby, Texas. They reported feeling immediately uneasy after moving into the home, but eventually began experiencing things they claim were caused by the supernatural. They discovered that the neighborhood was built on the remains of the Black Hope graveyard after two of their neighbors, Sam and Judy Haney, began construction on a pool and discovered human remains. The Williamses claimed that the graveyard, which contained the bodies of both enslaved people and sharecroppers, was not divulged by the developers, Purcell Co. Inc., who they said had received complaints from black families who had ancestors buried in the cemetery. The couple pursued legal action against the developers while living in the home after learning of the cemetery, with the developers responding that they would move the bodies or pay for the loss of home value if the Williamses could provide evidence that bodies were buried on the property.

The Haneys sued Purcell for $2 million in damages for psychological damages and property improvements, claiming that the developer was aware of Black Hope's existence and had deliberately withheld this information. The case received a trial by jury, where Purcell responded that they had been unaware of the cemetery's existence and countersued the Haneys for harassment. In 1987 the jury issued a verdict stating that they did not believe that the developers intentionally harmed the Haneys. They also recommended that the developers pay the Haneys $142,000, however the judge overseeing the case did not include any damages in the final verdict. The Haneys filed an appeal but were unsuccessful. The judge upheld the ruling and stated that Purcell was within their rights to build on the cemetery, as it had been abandoned. The couple appealed once more, bringing the case to the Supreme Court of Texas, where the appeal ruling was reversed and sent back for further consideration, however no rehearing was filed.

In 1987 one of the Williamses' daughters experienced a heart attack on the property and died, which led to the family vacating the property. The Williamses claim that her death was one of several caused by the home. The couple later divorced. The Haneys also moved from their home. In 2007 Chron interviewed people living in the subdivision as well as the Williams and Haney homes. Few of the inhabitants reported anything that could be attributed to the supernatural and the occupants of the Haney home stated that they had experienced nothing odd.

== Synopsis ==
In the book the Williamses detail their belief that their newly built home in a subdivision located in Crosby, Texas was haunted. The couple remained in the home for approximately seven years, during which time they state that they experienced supernatural events that ultimately led to the death of five family members. The couple reported that their toilet would repeatedly flush throughout the day and night, that their garage door would open and close during the day, repeated infestations of black ants, and rectangular sinkholes that would appear in the backyard. Initially believing these to be explainable events, the couple brought in workers to resolve the issues but none could find a cause for the issues. Other events reported by the couple included disembodied voices, appliances moving on the kitchen counter, and the house being unnaturally cold.

Eventually the Williamses learned that their subdivision was built on a cemetery containing the bodies of enslaved people and sharecroppers. Further research showed that the building developers had received complaints from black families who had ancestors buried in Black Hope but decided to continue building without acknowledging the burial site or moving all of the bodies. The Williamses decided to remain in the home. They stated that in the following years Ben was attacked by an unseen apparition in the garage, that family felt uncomfortable being in the home and were more prone to arguments and fighting, and that several seemingly health family members suddenly developed various forms of cancer or suffered from severe mental health issues. The book ends with the Williamses and several others choosing to flee their homes, with one family choosing to file a lawsuit against the developers.

== Development ==
John Bruce Shoemaker was introduced to Ben and Jean Williams through a mutual friend, who told him of the Williams' story. Plans were made for Shoemaker to work with the Williams family to write a book on the events, which took them approximately three and a half years. Per Shoemaker, he chose not to include all details of the Black Hope case, as he wanted to focus on the Williams family.

== Publication ==
The Black Hope Horror was first published in hardback the United States during 1991, through William Morrow & Co. This was followed by a mass-market paperback release in 1993, through Berkley Books.

== Reception ==
A reviewer for The Houston Post praised the book as "suspenseful and quick", while the work was panned by The Houston Chronicle felt that the work was unbelievable. Greg Lakes of The Missoulian praised the book as a "good ghost story" while remarking that the book felt too implausible and that Shoemaker did not answer key questions that Lakes felt would have resolved this issue. A reviewer for The Kansas City Star compared the book negatively to the 1982 film Poltergeist, writing that the book was a "good ghost story, but unfortunately it's too much of a case of life imitating art."

== Television film ==
In 1992 the book was adapted for a made-for-TV movie entitled Grave Secrets: The Legacy of Hilltop Drive. The film starred Patty Duke and David Selby as Jean and Ben "Shag" Williams. While developing the film the screenwriter and producer stayed with the Williamses for three and a half days, during which they reassured the couple that the film would not be sensationalized. The film was panned by The La Crosse Tribune and News-Pilot, the latter of which called it a "two hour 'Unexplained Mysteries' using name actors" and that "Those who refuse to believe in supernatural forces shouldn't waste a minute, however, except to punch holes in the theories of supernatural manifestations."

== See also ==
- The Amityville Horror
- Borley Rectory
