= Amityville: The Horror Returns =

1989 novel by John G. Jones

- Author: John G. Jones
- Language: English
- Series: The Amityville Horror
- Genre: Horror novel
- Publication date: 1989
- Publication place: United States
- Preceded by: Amityville: The Evil Escapes
- Followed by: Amityville - The Nightmare Continues

Amityville: The Horror Returns is a 1989 horror novel and the fifth installment in Amityville book series written by John G. Jones. It is the final book to be about the Lutzes as they are stalked by the presence they fled from in Amityville.

== Plot ==
On a seemingly ordinary day in southern California, George Lutz works on his new home while Kathy struggles to manage her mischievous sons, Greg and Matt. During breakfast, a housefly lands on George's food, and when he tries to swat it, he finds himself paralyzed, realizing the malevolent presence has returned. A fire-like entity, guided by the fly, approaches him, but Kathy wakes him from the nightmare. Their daughter Amy, hearing noises in the living room, believes her lost sister Jodie has returned, unaware of the sinister force at work. George and Kathy then leave for a business trip to Portland, Oregon, leaving the children with their sitter, Nancy.

The presence follows them, tormenting them even on the plane and at a golf course. Meanwhile, back home, the house's malevolence grows, targeting the children and Nancy. On their way back, George and Kathy face supernatural obstacles on the Los Angeles freeway, culminating in a car crash off a cliff. Rescued by a mysterious Indian man who destroys the dark cloud controlling their car, they race to their street, only to find their home replaced by the infamous 112 Ocean Avenue, the legendary Amityville house. The house greets them with flickering lights and an otherworldly orange glow, the street itself transforming into Ocean Avenue.

Determined to save their children, George insists they enter the house together. Outside, Shawna attempts to reach them but is stopped by an invisible barrier. Inside, the house has become sentient, speaking through doors, windows, and appliances. It replicates the Lutzes' previous Christmas decorations and gifts, creating an unsettling familiarity. Fueled by anger, George fights back, striking the walls, which temporarily halts the entity's activity. He commands Kathy to find the children and Nancy, while he continues his struggle.

Upstairs, Kathy discovers the children. Amy dances mysteriously with the spectral Jodie, causing objects to move around the room. Greg and Matt sit unresponsive on a bed, while the entity amplifies the chaos. George realizes the demonic force has assumed Nancy's form, confronting and melting the figure. Kathy tries to protect the children as the dancing intensifies into violent, supernatural motion.

Outside, Shawna uses her spiritual abilities to break the invisible barrier, revealing the house in its full, horrific form. Inside, the entity reforms as a faceless white figure wielding a supernatural shotgun. George confronts it to learn the children's location, discovering they are in the basement, the site of the house's ominous red room. Upstairs, Kathy attempts to command Jodie and Amy, finally halting the dancing. Greg and Matt clap eerily in response, heightening the tension. Shawna maneuvers past rifle fire from the house, drawing the entity's attention to protect the others.

As the struggle escalates, George is knocked out, leaving Kathy to lead the children down the stairs. She witnesses the rocking chair moving and Amy asking if Jodie can go with them, but she refuses. In the dining room, Shawna battles demonic forces, her efforts partially countered by her own powers but ultimately failing. Kathy focuses on guiding the children safely out of the house, determined to escape the supernatural terror that has overtaken their home.
