= The Amityville Horror Part II =

1982 book by John G. Jones

- Author: John G. Jones
- Language: English
- Genre: Horror
- Publisher: Warner Brothers
- Publication date: 1982
- Publication place: United States
- Media type: Print (hardback & paperback)
- Preceded by: The Amityville Horror
- Followed by: Amityville: The Final Chapter

The Amityville Horror Part II is a 1982 horror fiction book written by John G. Jones as the sequel to The Amityville Horror. The book was published in 1982 and recounts the aftermath of the original book and what happened to the Lutzes after they fled 112 Ocean Avenue. This was the final book in the series to be based or inspired by a true story. The sequels had the Lutzes as main characters and were marketed as "The Terrifying True Story Continues..." although there is a disclaimer stating that the book did change names and combined two people into one character for the book.

== History ==
In an interview after George and Kathy took lie detector tests, they revealed for the first time to the public that they were still experiencing paranormal problems. At the time, they were in the process of writing three books: "The Amityville Horror Picture Book," "Unwanted Company," and a third book, "A Force of Magnitude: Amityville II," which would tell of their continuing ordeal. While two of these books were never released independently, they were included later in the publication "Amityville: The Evil Escapes." A year later, John G. Jones sought to re-write "A Force of Magnitude: Amityville II" and rebranded it as "The Amityville Horror Part II."

== Plot ==
The Lutz family barely escapes 112 Ocean Ave. While fleeing Amityville, they are attacked but get away. They arrive at Kathy's mother's house, where they think they are safe. Soon after, George is awakened by a supernatural force. George and Kathy realize that they are being followed. Over the next few days, Kathy and her mother spot Missy playing with Jodie. Events plague the family. They get The Amityville Horror published and have to deal not only with the supernatural but with skeptics and a never-ending line of press.

== Criticisms ==
Like the previous one, this book was also released as a "true story." However, it was criticized that much of the story seemed to be fictional. Some have said that the book is an easy work of fiction that feeds off the original story's success. The most controversial part of the book is the completely new version of the 28th night.

== Changes from the first book ==
There are numerous changes from what was told in the first book. The final night in the original book was intense and moved quickly. In "Amityville II," the ending is re-written and similar to the film version. In this version, George and Kathy calmly leave the house, and George even returns to grab some clothes. The most significant film similarity is when the family realizes they almost left Harry behind, causing George to run back to the house (although in the book, George runs down the driveway and into the boathouse, while in the film, he has to re-enter the house, falling through the stairs and into the well). The night at Kathy's mother's house is also significantly changed. In the original, paranormal activity is presumed to start after George and Kathy arrive at the mother's house, whereas in "Amityville II," it begins right after they leave the house. The first night at Kathy's mother's house is also re-written. The epilogue of "The Amityville Horror" is also fictionalized in "Amityville II."

== Validity ==
In numerous interviews, the Lutz family claimed they were followed by what was at the house. In his investigation of the property, Hans Holzer discovered that the house was possibly built on an Indian burial ground. He also suggested that Defeo was possessed by the Indian chief only because he wanted him out of the house. Therefore, according to Holzer, the Lutz family was not followed by the ghosts. However, demonologist Lorraine Warren said that the force in the house was not bound there, implying it could have followed the family when they left.
