= Jungle 2 Jungle =

1997 film by John Pasquin

- Theatrical release poster
- Directed by: John Pasquin
- Written by: Bruce A. Evans; Raynold Gideon
- Based on: Un indien dans la ville by: Hervé Palud; Philippe Bruneau; Thierry Lhermitte
- Produced by: Brian Reilly
- Starring: Tim Allen; Martin Short; Lolita Davidovich; David Ogden Stiers; JoBeth Williams
- Cinematography: Tony Pierce-Roberts
- Edited by: Michael A. Stevenson
- Music by: Michael Convertino
- Production company: TF1 International
- Distributed by: Buena Vista Pictures Distribution (Note: Distributed under the Walt Disney Pictures banner.) (select territories); Ariane Distribution (France)
- Release dates: March 7, 1997 (US); August 5, 1998 (France)
- Running time: 105 minutes
- Countries: United States; France
- Language: English
- Budget: $32 million
- Box office: $59.9 million

Jungle 2 Jungle is a 1997 comedy film directed by John Pasquin, produced by TF1 Films Production, and starring Tim Allen, Martin Short, Lolita Davidovich, David Ogden Stiers and JoBeth Williams. A co-production between France and the United States, it is an English-language remake of the 1994 French film Un indien dans la ville (also known as Little Indian, Big City). Its plot follows that of the original film fairly closely, with the biggest difference being the change in location from Paris to New York City.

The film was released in the United States by Buena Vista Pictures Distribution under its Walt Disney Pictures label on March 7, 1997, and in France by Ariane Distribution on August 5, 1998. Like its original French film, it was a moderate box office success but was panned by critics.

== Plot ==
Michael Cromwell is a self-absorbed commodities broker living in New York City. Wanting to marry his fiancée, Charlotte, he needs to obtain a divorce from his first wife, Patricia, who left him years earlier. She now lives with a semi-Westernized tribe in Canaima National Park, Venezuela. He travels there to get her signature on the divorce papers. Upon his arrival, she reveals that she was unknowingly pregnant when she left, and they have a son together, named Mimi-Siku, who is now 13.

Michael attempts to bond with Mimi and promises to take him to New York City "when he is a man". That night, Mimi undergoes the traditional rite of passage of the tribe, who then considers him to be a man. The tribal elder gives him a task to bring fire from the Statue of Liberty in order to become the next chief. A reluctant Michael brings Mimi to New York City with him.

Charlotte is less than pleased about Mimi and his primitive ways. As Michael attempts to adapt Mimi to city life, cross-cultural misunderstandings occur. On climbing the Statue of Liberty to reach the torch, he is disappointed that the flame is not real.

While staying at the home of Michael's business partner Richard Kempster, Mimi falls in love with his daughter, Karen. Richard resents Mimi's presence due to his influence over Karen and because he ate his prize-winning Poecilia latipinna fish. Richard freaks out when he sees Karen and Mimi together in a hammock and threatens to send her to an all-girls summer camp; Mimi also attempts to make amends by replacing Richard's fish with wild ones, but Richard is not appeased.

The Kempsters and Michael are targeted by Alexei Jovanovic, a Russian mobster and caviar dealer who believes that they have cheated him in a business deal. He arrives at the Kempsters' home and tortures Richard for information. By fighting together and utilizing Mimi's hunting skills and his pet tarantula Maitika (who attacks whenever people scream), Michael and Mimi fight off Jovanovic and his minions.

Before returning to the Amazon jungle, Mimi is given a satellite phone by Michael so they can stay in touch. He also presents him with a Statue of Liberty cigarette lighter, which produces fire from the torch and will fulfill his quest. In return, Mimi gives Michael a blowpipe and poisoned darts, telling him to practice and come to see him when he can hit flies.

Shortly afterward, Michael finds himself disheartened by his relationship with Charlotte and attempts to kill a fly with his blowpipe on the trading floor of the New York Board of Trade. He hits it but also his hot-tempered boss Langston, who collapses asleep on the trading floor.

Michael returns to Lipo-Lipo to see Mimi and Patricia, bringing the Kempsters along for a vacation. Karen and Mimi are reunited, and it is suggested that Michael and Patricia also resume their relationship.

As the closing credits start rolling, Michael undergoes the rite of passage as Mimi did earlier.

== Cast ==
- Tim Allen as Michael Cromwell
- Martin Short as Richard Kempster
- Lolita Davidovich as Charlotte
- David Ogden Stiers as Alexei Jovanovic
- Bob Dishy as George Langston
- JoBeth Williams as Dr. Patricia Cromwell
- Sam Huntington as Mimi-Siku Cromwell
- Valerie Mahaffey as Jan Kempster
- Leelee Sobieski as Karen Kempster
- Frankie J. Galasso as Andrew Kempster
- Luis Ávalos as Abe
- Carole Shelley as Fiona Glockman
- Adam LeFevre as Morrison
- Dominic Keating as Ian
- Rondi Reed as Sarah

== Reception ==
Review aggregation website Rotten Tomatoes gives Jungle 2 Jungle a rating of 19%, based on reviews from 42 critics. The site's consensus states: "Tim Allen spends Jungle 2 Jungle annoyed and put upon, mirroring audiences' reaction as they struggle through this witless family comedy."

Roger Ebert was disappointed by the film, giving it one star out of four, a small step from his original zero star rating for Little Indian, Big City. On his television program Siskel and Ebert, Ebert said Jungle 2 Jungle was not as bad as Little Indian, Big City because it was "far too mediocre to be terrible." He also described it as "lamebrained, boring, predictable, long, and slow", and added that while the French version was memorably bad, Jungle 2 Jungle was "just forgettable". Ebert's colleague Gene Siskel mildly disagreed, specifying that he felt Jungle 2 Jungle was just as bad as Little Indian, Big City. He also said he felt embarrassed for Allen and Short, as he felt they were used far better in other television programs and films. Siskel later went on to declare Jungle 2 Jungle the worst film of 1997.

At the 1997 Stinkers Bad Movie Awards, the film was listed as one of 30 dishonorable mentions for Worst Picture and was noted under the Founders Award, which lamented the year's biggest studio disgraces. Referencing Siskel's pick for worst film of the year (they called it "a horrendous embarrassment for Disney"), the Stinkers stated that it had "just as many laughs as Little Indian, Big City (zero) and we're being generous" and added that Disney needed to stop remaking so many films.

== Soundtrack ==
The soundtrack consists of 15 songs.

=== Track listing ===
1. Maxi Priest – "It Starts in the Heart" (4:44)
2. Peter Gabriel/Youssou N'Dour/Shaggy – "Shaking the Tree" (5:34)
3. Dana Hutson – "It's My Life" (3:29)
4. Jam Nation – "Awakening" (2:52)
5. Joseph Arthur – "Big City Secret" (4:37)
6. The Sha-Shees – "You Can Do It" (3:53)
7. Rique Pantoja – "By the Sea" (3:48)
8. Totó la Momposina y Sus Tambores – "La Sombra Negra" (3:25)
9. "Between Two Worlds" (2:16)
10. George Acogny – "Fire Dance/Ceremony Chant" (2:25)
11. Eyuphuro – "Akatswela" (4:47)
12. Afro Celt Sound System – "Whirl-Y-Reel I" (3:32)
13. Totó la Momposina y Sus Tambores – "Malanga" (4:06)
14. "New York Jungle" (0:49)
15. The Pointer Sisters - “I’m So Excited” (3:51)

== Included clips ==
- Disney Time (1997) On BBC1 (Spider Chase from Jungle 2 Jungle)
