= John Myers (medium) =

British dentist and spiritualist medium

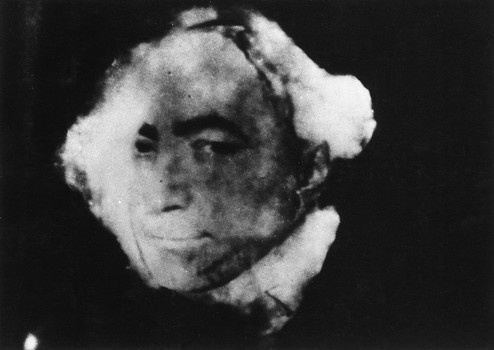
Alleged spirit photograph produced by Myers.

John Myers (died 1972) was a British dentist and spiritualist medium.

== Career ==
Myers worked as a dentist in London and took up spirit photography in the 1930s. He claimed to communicate with an American Indian spirit guide called "Blackfoot".

Myers was exposed as a fraud in 1932 by the Marquess of Donegall. During a seance with an art editor for the Sunday Dispatch, journalist Hannen Swaffer and magician Will Goldston, marked plates were secretly inserted into Myers' camera. Myers during the seance developed the photographs. Two of the plates contained extras that were not marked. Myers was accused of substituting plates. The psychical researcher Simeon Edmunds wrote that Myers "was detected in fraud by Lord Donegall, whose report, published in the Sunday Dispatch, brought the career of the medium-photographer to an abrupt conclusion."

According to Harry Price, in 1935 Myers was accused of fraud by J. B. McIndoe, president of the Spiritualists' National Union.

The spiritualist Maurice Barbanell, editor of Psychic News, defended Myers in a book and considered his phenomena to be genuine.

Criticism of Barbanell and Myers can be found in Simeon Edmunds (1966).
