= John George Jones =

- Born: September 18, 1849
- Died: June 7, 1914 (aged 64)
- Occupations: American lawyer; Illinois State Representative

John George Jones (September 18, 1849 – June 7, 1914) was an African-American lawyer, and state legislator in Chicago, Illinois who advocated for civil rights.

== Biography ==
Jones was born in Ithaca, New York on September 18, 1849. His family relocated to Chicago in 1856.

During the presidency of Ulysess Grant, Jones was named a Special United States Commissioner to Cuba, in order to investigate "the complaints and charges that had been made about the colored people of the United States being captured and sold there as slaves."

Jones studied law and was admitted to the Illinois bar on March 25, 1884. He fought for civil rights in the state of Illinois, and practiced criminal defense law in his Chicago, Illinois office located at 191 Clark Street. He defended both black and white clients.

He served in the Illinois House of Representatives for the 5th District of Cook County from 1901 to 1903. While a member, Jones spoke out against the newly founded Provident Hospital, the first African-American-run hospital in the United States. Jones believed that such a facility encouraged and perpetuated racial segregtation. He also sponsored laws against police brutality.

=== Freemasonry ===
He was a Prince Hall Freemason and received the 33rd degree.

However, after failing to be elected as Sovereign Grand Commander, the leader of the United Supreme Council of the Scottish Rite in Prince Hall Freemasonry in 1895, he created his own Supreme Council. Some contemporary sources, such as the Michigan Law Journal, reported on his election and 1896 re-election as Grand Commander of this new Supreme Council.

In 1903, he formed a rival grand Lodge in Illinois which led to his expulsion from the Most Worshipful Prince Hall Grand Lodge of Illinois in 1904.

=== Death ===
Jones died on June 7, 1914, and was interred at the Oakwood Cemetery in Chicago.

=== Legacy ===
In 2002, the General Grand Masonic Congress dedicated a memorial wall to him Oakwood Cemetery where he is buried.

== See also ==
- List of African-American officeholders (1900–1959)
