= Philip Solomon (medium) =

British spiritualist medium, author and broadcaster

- Born: 23 July 1959 (age 66); Wolverhampton, England
- Occupations: Spiritualist medium, paranormal researcher

Philip Solomon (born 23 July 1951 in Wolverhampton, England) is a British Spiritualist medium, author, and broadcaster. He has written numerous books on the paranormal world.

He is a former radio presenter for Wolverhampton City Radio 101.8 FM. He was also a freelance presenter for, among others, BBC Radio WM. hE has written for the Express & Star newspaper, and the paranormal magazines Psychic World Newspaper, Haunted, Fate & Fortune, and Psychic News.

== Selected bibliography ==
- Ghosts of the Midlands and How To Detect Them, 1989
- Ghosts, Legends and Psychic Snippets, 1990
- Black Country Ways in Bygone Days, 1992
- Dreamers Psychic Dictionary, 1993
- Ghosts and Phantoms of Central England, 1998
- Beyond Death, Conditions in the Afterlife, 2001 (co-written with Professor Hans Holzer)
- Haunted Derby, 2007
- Guided by the Light, The Autobiography of a Born Medium, 2008
- Official Wolves Quiz Book, 2008
- Official Aston Villa Quiz Book, 2008
- The A-Z of Spiritualism, 2019
