= Stephen Kaplan (paranormal investigator) =

American paranormal investigator

- Born: Stephen Kaplan; September 19, 1940; Bronx, New York, US
- Died: June 9, 1995 (aged 54); Maspeth, Queens, NY
- Education: City College of New York, SUNY at Stony Brook, and Pacific College
- Occupations: Teacher, parapsychologist
- Known for: The Amityville Horror Conspiracy

Stephen Kaplan (September 19, 1940 – June 9, 1995) was an American paranormal investigator, vampirologist, and founder/director of the Vampire Research Center and the Parapsychology Institute of America, both of which were founded in Suffolk County, New York and subsequently relocated to Elmhurst, Queens. He was also an author and radio commentator, and a prominent skeptic of the alleged Amityville Horror hauntings. Kaplan lived in Suffolk County, New York and worked for the New York City Board of Education. His overview of the Amityville Horror became the basis for the film The Amityville Horror Conspiracy that chronicles his attempt to prove the story was a hoax.

== Amityville Horror dispute ==
In 1974, Ronald DeFeo Jr. shot and killed his parents and four younger siblings at the picturesque home known as the Amityville Horror, and was sentenced in 1975 to serve six sentences of 25 years to life. George and Kathy Lutz moved into the house on December 18, 1975. They remained in the house for one month before fleeing, citing hauntings, demons, and other unexplained disturbances.

Jay Anson's 1977 book The Amityville Horror chronicles the paranormal events leading up to their departure from the Lutzes' perspective. The book became a bestseller, and was the basis for two movies, in 1979 and 2005. Kaplan's The Amityville Horror Conspiracy counters Anson's work, and argues that Lutz deliberately defrauded the public.

According to Kaplan, on February 16, 1976, shortly after the Lutzes abandoned the house, Kaplan received a phone call from George Lutz. At the time, Kaplan was the executive director of the Parapsychology Institute of America on Long Island, and a frequent guest on the WBAB radio program Spectrum with Joel Martin. Lutz requested that Kaplan and his associates at the Parapsychology Institute investigate the home. As Kaplan recalled in The Amityville Horror Conspiracy, this initial conversation immediately aroused his suspicions as to the validity of Lutz's claim that the house was haunted. Kaplan claims Lutz asked about a fee for the group's services and Kaplan told him that they did not charge for the investigation but that "if the story is a hoax...the public will know". Shortly after, Lutz called and canceled the investigation.

George and Kathleen Lutz claimed that Kaplan's credentials did not check out and that his claims to be a vampirologist made them wary of any involvement with the case. Kaplan also held a PhD that was from a non-traditional college. Ed and Lorraine Warren had defended themselves with this when questioned about the Amityville Horror Conspiracy.

The respective claims of the Kaplans and the Lutz family are the subject of a documentary, Amityville: Horror or Hoax, distributed by the History Channel.

== Awards ==
- AAPHR (Association to Advance Parapsychology and Hypnosis Research) Appreciation Award in recognition of outstanding contributions to the First National Parapsychology Convention, October 14, 1978.
- The Rev. Dr. Montague Summers Memorial Award, Count Dracula Society, 1977
- Dudley Wright Commemorative Award for special achievements in promoting the field of Vampirology, Journal of Vampirism, 1978
- Albert Einstein Award, Success, Inc., PA
- Parapsychology Hall of Fame, 1982
- AAPHR Sir Arthur Conan Doyle Award for outstanding research, October 21, 1983
- Hypnosis Hall of Fame, 1987

== Education ==
- City College of New York: BA in Sociology
- City College of New York: MS in Education
- SUNY at Stony Brook: MS in Interdisciplinary Studies
- Pacific College: PhD in Sociology

== Bibliography ==
- Kaplan, Stephen. In Pursuit of Premature Gods & Contemporary Vampires. Self-published, (1st Edition 1976).
- Kaplan, Stephen (as told to Carole Kane). Vampires Are. Palm Springs: ETC Publications, 1984. ISBN 0-88280-103-1 / ISBN 978-0-88280-103-2
- Kaplan, Stephen and Kaplan, Roxanne Salch. The Amityville Horror Conspiracy. Toad Hall, (1st Edition 1995). ISBN 0-9637498-0-3 /ISBN 9780963749802
