= Amityville: It's About Time =

1992 film by Tony Randel

- Promotional poster
- Directed by: Tony Randel
- Written by: John G. Jones; Christopher DeFaria; Antonio Toro
- Produced by: Barry Bernardi; Steve White; Christopher DeFaria
- Starring: Stephen Macht; Shawn Weatherly; Megan Ward; Damon Martin; Jonathan Penner; Nita Talbot
- Cinematography: Christopher Taylor
- Edited by: Rick Finney
- Music by: Daniel Licht
- Distributed by: Multicom Entertainment Group
- Release date: July 16, 1992
- Running time: 94 minutes
- Country: United States
- Language: English

Amityville 1992: It's About Time (released as Curse of Amityville: The Final Chapter in the Philippines) is a 1992 American supernatural horror film directed by Tony Randel and starring Stephen Macht, Shawn Weatherly, Megan Ward, and Damon Martin. It is the sixth film based on The Amityville Horror. It was released direct-to-video in 1992 by Republic Pictures Home Video. In Mexico, the film was released in theaters in 1992.

== Plot ==
Jacob Sterling, an architect from Burlwood, California, has just returned from a business trip to Amityville, New York. During his absence, his ex-girlfriend, art student Andrea Livingston, took care of his two teenagers, Lisa and Rusty.

Excitedly, Jacob announces that Amityville has commissioned his firm to design a new neighborhood. He also brings back an old mantel clock he found in the ruins there, placing it on the fireplace and saying, "This is exactly what our home needed." However, the clock has stuck to the mantel, making it immovable.

Once the clock is on the mantel, things start to go wrong. The clock ticks loudly, and the sound can be heard upstairs. But the strangest of all is when Rusty goes downstairs in the middle of the night and turns on the living room light switch, the living room is replaced with an ancient-looking torture chamber. This happens until the lightbulb finally burns out.

The next morning, after Lisa and Rusty leave for school, Jacob finishes his jog. His digital watch stops, and he turns around to see his neighbor Mrs. Tetmann with her dog, Peaches. She releases Peaches, who attacks Jacob's leg. Jacob defends himself with a bottle. At the hospital, a doctor confuses Andrea for Jacob's wife and advises her to care for his wound. However, Jacob neglects his injury at home and denies her help.

Rusty skips school and goes to his neighbor Iris Wheeler to talk about something he saw. Iris thinks there is an evil force at play. She explains that it came to their home because its old place is gone and it needs a new home. When Rusty and Andrea visit Mrs. Tetmann to ask about Peaches’ rabies vaccine, she doesn’t understand and shows them that Peaches has no cuts. Rusty reflects on Iris's words.

Jacob is busy designing a new neighborhood model. At dinner, Andrea asks Rusty to fetch the phone book, and when he returns after a minute, he finds the kitchen empty and the table cleared. Shocked to learn that three hours have passed, he keeps this to himself.

Lisa lets Andrea sleep in her room while she takes the couch. The ticking clock keeps Lisa awake, and around 3:00 a.m., she asks to sleep with Andrea. After getting permission, Lisa goes to fetch her pillow, but the living room doors slam shut and lock her inside.

Meanwhile, Andrea feels something slimy on her bed and finds it soaked in black slime. She turns on the light but sees nothing. After unlocking the doors for Lisa, she wonders if Rusty locked them, but he claims he was out for a walk.

The next morning, Andrea discovers that Peaches was killed, with a swastika drawn in blood on Mrs. Tetmann's house. The police suspect Rusty. That night, Andrea's boyfriend Dr. Leonard Stafford hallucinates about Jacob interrogating him.

The next day, Rusty visits Iris, sharing strange occurrences since his father's return from Amityville. Iris discovers the clock is the source of the trouble, but as she tries to warn Rusty, a stork statue falls from a truck and kills her.

At the same time, problems arise at the Sterling house. Lisa's boyfriend, Andy, melts onto the floor, Leonard faces goo a zombie rises from the bathtub, and Jacob behaves aggressively. Now, Lisa and Jacob are fully under the clock's control. Rusty is forced to defend himself and kills Lisa.

Andrea fights off Jacob's attack but discovers that the clock has de-aged Rusty into a child as he tries to destroy it. Andrea tells the clock to let Rusty go and starts breaking open the wall. Inside, she finds giant clock gears and cannot destroy the clock. As the clock ages her into an old woman, she ignites a gas pipe, causing an explosion which hurls the clock into another dimension.

Andrea suddenly wakes up to find herself unharmed and back to her normal age, on the first night Jacob brought the clock home. Upon seeing the clock in Jacob's hands, Andrea, recalling everything, breaks it in anger. Ignoring Jacob questioning her, she grabs her overnight bag and leaves. Meanwhile, Rusty notices Iris across the street, and they smile, sharing a moment of mutual remembrance. Exactly how much everyone involved with the clock actually remembers is left ambiguous.

== Cast ==
- Stephen Macht as Jacob Sterling
- Shawn Weatherly as Andrea Livingston
- Megan Ward as Lisa Sterling
- Damon Martin as Rusty Sterling
- Jonathan Penner as Dr. Leonard Stafford
- Nita Talbot as Iris Wheeler
- Dean Cochran as Andy
- Terrie Snell as Mrs. Tetmann
- Kevin Bourland as Officer #1
- Margarita Franco as Officer #2
- William B. Jackson as Officer #3
- Willie C. Carpenter as Doctor
- Dick Miller as Mr. Anderson
- Alan Berman as Van Driver
- Dylan Milo as Baby Rusty Sterling

== Release ==
The film was released direct-to-video in the United States on July 16, 1992 by Republic Pictures Home Video and in July 2005 on DVD by Lionsgate, under license from previous rights holder Fremantle. In the Philippines, the film was theatrically released by Jemah Films as Curse of Amityville: The Final Chapter on February 11, 1993. In 2019, Vinegar Syndrome, under license from Multicom Entertainment Group, released the film on Blu-ray in the US which was included in the boxset "Amityville: The Cursed Collection". In 2022, the film was released on Blu-ray in the UK courtesy of Screenbound Pictures Ltd.

== Reception ==
On Rotten Tomatoes, a review aggregate, the film currently holds an approval rating of 45% based on 11 reviews. The film was ranked no. 10 on Game Rant's list of the "Best Amityville Horror Movies" in 2021.
