= List of horror films of 2017 =

This is a list of horror films that were released in 2017.

== Highest-grossing horror films of 2017 ==
Highest-grossing horror films of 2017
Rank	Title	Distributor	Worldwide gross
1	It	Warner Bros. Pictures	$704.2 million
2	The Mummy	Universal Pictures	$410 million
3	Resident Evil: The Final Chapter	Sony Pictures Releasing / Metropolitan Filmexport / Constantin Film	$312.2 million
4	Annabelle: Creation	Warner Bros. Pictures	$306.5 million
5	Split	Universal Pictures	$278.5 million
6	Get Out	Universal Pictures	$255.4 million
7	Alien: Covenant	20th Century Fox	$240.9 million
8	Jigsaw	Lionsgate Films	$104.2 million
9	Life	Sony Pictures Releasing	$100.5 million
10	Rings	Paramount Pictures	$83.1 million

== 2017 horror films ==
Horror films released in 2017
Title	Director	Cast	Country	Notes
1922	Zak Hilditch	Thomas Jane, Neal McDonough, Molly Parker	United States	
Against the Night	Brian Cavallaro	Frank Whaley, Hannah Kleeman, Tim Torre	United States	
Alien: Covenant	Ridley Scott	Michael Fassbender, Katherine Waterston, Billy Crudup	United Kingdom; United States	Science fiction horror
Aliens: Zone of Silence	Andy Fowler	Sarah Hester, Peter Gesswein, Jed Maheu	United States	
Amityville: The Awakening	Franck Khalfoun	Jennifer Jason Leigh, Bella Thorne, Cameron Monaghan	United States	
Amityville: Evil Never Dies	Dustin Ferguson	Ben Gothier, Michelle Muir-Lewis, Mark Patton	United States	
Amityville Exorcism	Mark Polonia	Marie DeLorenzo, Jeff Kirkendall, James Carolus	United States	
Anna and the Apocalypse	John McPhail	Ella Hunt, Malcolm Cumming, Sarah Swire	United Kingdom	
Annabelle: Creation	David F. Sandberg	Stephanie Sigman, Anthony LaPaglia, Miranda Otto	United States	
The Babysitter	McG	Samara Weaving	United States	
Boar	Chris Sun	Nathan Jones, John Jarratt, Melissa Tkautz, Bill Moseley	Australia	
The Black Room	Rolfe Kanefsky	Natasha Henstridge, Lukas Hassel, Lin Shaye.	United States	
Bloodlands	Steven Kastrissios	Gëzim Rudi, Suela Bako, Emiljano Palali	Albania	
Bloody Crayons	Topel Lee	Janella Salvador, Elmo Magalona, Sofia Andres, Diego Loyzaga, Jane Oineza, Maris Racal, Yves Flores, Empoy Marquez, Ronnie Alonte	Philippines	
The Bye Bye Man	Stacy Title	Doug Jones, Douglas Smith, Michael Trucco	United States	
The Covenant	Robert Conway	Monica Engesser, Owen Conway, Clint James, Sanford Gibbons, Maria Olsen, Shawn Saavedra, Richard Lippert and Amelia Haberman	United States	Mystery horror thriller drama
Creep 2	Patrick Brice	Mark Duplass, Desiree Akhavan, Karan Soni	United States	
Cult of Chucky	Don Mancini	Fiona Dourif, Brad Dourif, Jennifer Tilly	United States	
Downrange	Ryuhei Kitamura	Kelly Connaire, Stephanie Pearson, Rod Hernandez	United States	
Eat Locals	Jason Flemyng	Eve Myles, Mackenzie Crook, Charlie Cox	United Kingdom	
The Endless	Justin Benson, Aaron Scott Moorhead	Aaron Moorhead, Justin Benson, Callie Hernandez	Canada	
The Evil Within	Andrew Getty	Frederick Koehler, Michael Berryman, Sean Patrick Flanery	United States	
Flatliners	Niels Arden Oplev	Elliot Page, Diego Luna, Nina Dobrev	United States	
Gerald's Game	Mike Flanagan	Carla Gugino, Bruce Greenwood, Carel Struycken	United States	
Get Out	Jordan Peele	Daniel Kaluuya, Allison Williams, Catherine Keener, Bradley Whitford	United States	
The Ghost Bride	Chito S. Roño	Kim Chiu, Matteo Guidicelli, Christian Bables, Alice Dixson	Philippines	
Halloween Pussy Trap Kill! Kill!	Jared Cohn	Sara Malakul Lane, Richard Grieco, Dave Mustaine	United States	
Happy Death Day	Christopher Landon	Jessica Rothe, Israel Broussard, Ruby Modine	United States	
The Heretics	Chad Archibald	Nina Kiri, Ry Barrett, Jorja Cadence	Canada	
The Houses October Built 2	Bobby Roe	Brandy Schaefer, Zack Andrews, Mikey Roe, Bobby Roe	United States	
It	Andrés Muschietti	Jaeden Lieberher, Bill Skarsgård	United States	
Jackals	Kevin Greutert	Deborah Kara Unger, Johnathon Schaech, Chelsea Ricketts	United States	
Jeepers Creepers 3	Victor Salva	Victor Salva, Stan Shaw, Meg Foster	United States	
Jigsaw	The Spierig Brothers	Laura Vandervoort, Callum Keith Rennie, Brittany Allen	United States	
Kuso	Flying Lotus	Tim Heidecker, George Clinton, Hannibal Buress	United States	
Leatherface	Julien Maury and Alexandre Bustillo	Stephen Dorff, Lili Taylor, Finn Jones	United States	
Life	Daniel Espinosa	Jake Gyllenhaal, Ryan Reynolds, Rebecca Ferguson	United States	
Little Evil	Eli Craig	Evangeline Lilly, Adam Scott, Bridget Everett	United States	
Mother!	Darren Aronofsky	Jennifer Lawrence, Ed Harris, Michelle Pfeiffer	United States	
One Cut of the Dead	Shin'ichirō Ueda	Takayuki Hamatsu, Yuzuki Akiyama, Kazuaki Nagaya	Japan	
Phoenix Forgotten	Justin Barber	Florence Hartigan, Cyd Strittmatter, Ana DelaCruz	United States	
Psychos	Sandy Chukhdadarian	Angelica Chitwood, Deniele Ramos Cloutier, Melissa Elena Jones	United States	
Rings	F. Javier Gutiérrez	Matilda Lutz, Alex Roe, Johnny Galecki	United States	
The Killing of a Sacred Deer	Yorgos Lanthimos	Barry Keoghan, Colin Farrell, Nicole Kidman	Ireland; United Kingdom	
Residue	Rusty Nixon	James Clayton, Taylor Hickson, Matt Frewer	Canada	
The Ritual	David Bruckner	Rafe Spall, Arsher Ali, Robert James-Collier	United Kingdom	
Romeo's Distress	Jeff Frumess	Anthony Malchar, Jeffrey Alan Solomon, Adam Stordy, Charese Scott Cooper	United States	
Sharknado 5: Global Swarming	Anthony Ferrante	Ian Ziering, Tara Reid, Cassie Scerbo	United States	
The Sleep Curse	Herman Yau	Anthony Wong	Hong Kong	
Smaller and Smaller Circles	Raya Martin	Nonie Buencamino, Sid Lucero, Madeleine Humphries, Gladys Reyes, Ricky Davao, Bembol Roco, TJ Trinidad, Christopher de Leon, Tessie Tomas	Philippines	
Terrified	Demián Rugna	Maxi Ghione, Norberto Gonzalo, Elvira Onetto, George L. Lewis	Argentina	
Thelma	Joachim Trier	Eili Harboe, Kaya Wilkins, Henrik Rafaelsen, Ellen Dorrit Petersen	Norway	
Tigers Are Not Afraid	Issa Lopez	Paola Lara, Juan Ramon Lopez, Ianis Guerrero	Mexico	
Tragedy Girls	Tyler MacIntyre	Alexandra Shipp, Brianna Hildebrand, Josh Hutcherson	United States	Horror comedy
Trench 11	Leo Scherman	Rossif Sutherland, Robert Stadlober, Charlie Carrick	Canada	
Underworld: Blood Wars	Anna Foerster	Kate Beckinsale, Theo James, Lara Pulver, Bradley James	United States	
Unlisted Owner	Jed Brian	Gavin Groves, Andrea Potts, Tyler Landers, Levi Atkins	United States	
Vampire Cleanup Department	Yan Pak-wing, Chiu Sin-hang	Babyjohn Choi, Chin Siu-ho, Lin Min Chen	Hong Kong	
Veronica	Paco Plaza	Sandra Escacena, Bruna González, Claudia Placer	Spain	
Victor Crowley	Adam Green	Parry Shen, Laura Ortiz, Kane Hodder	United States	
Werewolves of the Third Reich	Andrew Jones	Annabelle Lanyon, Lee Bane, Derek Nelson	United Kingdom	Sci-fi horror
Wish Upon	John R. Leonetti	Joey King, Ki Hong Lee, Josephine Langford	United States	
Who's Watching Oliver	Richie Moore	Russell Geoffrey Banks, Sara Malakul Lane, Margaret Roche	United States and Thailand	Romance
XX	Roxanne Benjamin, Annie Clark, Karyn Kusama, Jovanka Vuckovic	Melanie Lynskey, Christina Kirk, Kyle Allen	United States	
