= Jewish war conspiracy theory =

Antisemitic conspiracy theory

The claim that there was a Jewish war against Nazi Germany is an antisemitic conspiracy theory promoted in Nazi propaganda which asserts that the Jewish people, framed within the theory as a single historical actor, started World War II and sought the destruction of Germany. Alleging that war was declared in 1939 by Chaim Weizmann, president of the World Zionist Organization, Nazis used this false notion to justify the persecution of Jews under German control on the grounds that the Holocaust was justified self-defense. Since the end of World War II, the conspiracy theory has been popular among neo-Nazis and Holocaust deniers.

== Origins ==
After the Central Powers' defeat in World War I, false rumors emerged in the Weimar Republic and Hungary alleging that the Jews in those countries conspired with foreign Jews in order to undermine the war effort (the stab-in-the-back myth). Some also accused European Jews of working together to start the war for the purpose of ruining Europe and leaving it vulnerable to "Jewish control". Jews were also blamed for manipulating the peace negotiations to produce an unsatisfactory result in the postwar treaties, for their own profit.

Nazis claimed that the 1933 anti-Nazi boycott was an aggressive action by Jews, and launched the Nazi boycott of Jewish businesses in retaliation. The British Daily Express ran a headline on 24 March 1933 regarding the anti-Nazi boycott, stating "Judea Declares War on Germany", showing that such claims were not limited to Nazi propaganda. Before the war broke out, Adolf Hitler repeatedly opined that Jews posed a severe threat to Germany, including on 30 January 1939 when he gave his prophecy speech and predicted that a war caused by the Jews would lead to the "annihilation of the Jewish race in Europe".

== World War II ==
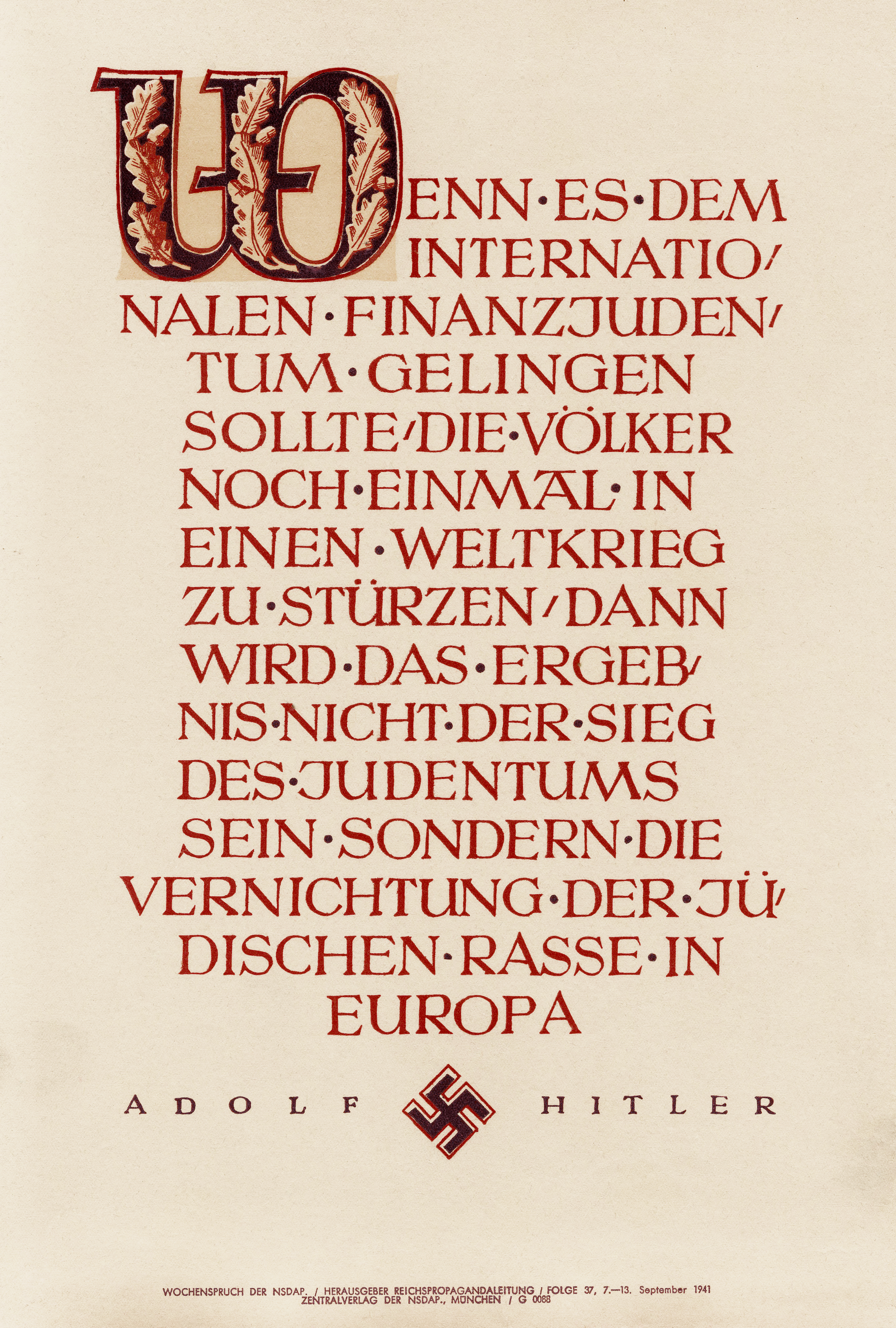
Wochenspruch der NSDAP, displayed 7–13 September 1941, quotes Hitler's speech on 30 January 1939

For Hitler, the start of World War II on 1 September 1939 confirmed the idea that there had been a Jewish conspiracy against Germany all along, even though Germany started the war by invading Poland. Historian Jeffrey Herf writes that "According to Hitler's paranoid logic, the Jews had launched the war so that the Nazis would be compelled to wage a war of retaliation against the Jews of Europe." Herf also wrote that "the core of Nazism's narrative of World War II" was that "A historical subject called 'international Jewry' had launched World War II with the intent of bringing about the 'Bolshevization' of the world. It would fail. Instead, Nazi Germany would retaliate for this aggression and annihilate the Jews. It would wage a 'war' against the Jews in response to the 'war' the Jews had started."

Scholar Randall Bytwerk writes: "The Nazis justified their attempt to exterminate the Jews by claiming that they were only defending themselves against Jewish plans to destroy Germany and its population." Historian Erik Sjöberg states: "the Nazis had convinced themselves that they were fighting a war in defense of the German race that the Jews had forced upon them. This was a lie perceived as truth by people who needed justification for murder."

In The German War, historian Nicholas Stargardt writes that by mid-1942, hard-line Nazi ideologues such as Martin Bormann thought that Germans "should be made to realise that they were now locked in a genocidal global conflict, which could end only with their victory or destruction". In response to queries about how to explain the "extremely harsh measures" taken against the Jews, Bormann told local Nazi operatives to justify, rather than deny, the systematic deportation that resulted in murder.

=== Chaim Weizmann's letter to Neville Chamberlain ===
On 29 August 1939, World Zionist Organization president Chaim Weizmann wrote a letter to British Prime Minister Neville Chamberlain, which included the following statement: "In this hour of supreme crisis the consciousness that Jews have a contribution to make to the defence of sacred values impels me to write this letter. I wish to confirm in the most explicit manner the declarations which I and my colleagues have made during the last month and especially in the last week: that the Jews stand by Great Britain and will fight on the side of the democracies."

In Nazi propaganda, the letter was presented as a "Jewish declaration of war" against Nazi Germany, and a threat of an actual attack by "the Jews." The "Jewish declaration of war" became a common motif in far-right antisemitism after World War II. The Nazis also claimed that Weizmann had sent a telegram in 1942 to a "Zionist group" stating: "The Jews desire their place in the ranks, among those who have as their goal the annihilation of Germany." No evidence that Weizmann sent such a telegram has been discovered.

The head of the Reich League of the German Press, Otto Dietrich, issued directives requiring all German newspapers to promote the Jewish war conspiracy theory. One March 1943 directive required newspapers to report that: "The declaration of war by the Jews against the European nations resulted in energetic measures being taken against the Jews, not only in Germany but also in many other European states."

=== Germany Must Perish! ===
Nazi propaganda focused on and greatly exaggerated the importance of the self-published book Germany Must Perish! by the obscure American Jewish businessman Theodore N. Kaufman, which was cited as proof that Jews desired to commit genocide against Nazi Germany.

=== 1944 anti-Zionist campaign ===
In June 1944, Dietrich and Helmut Sündermann launched a campaign against Zionism, to promote the lie that the German war against Jews was defensive in nature. The origins of the Nazi genocide against the Jews were dated to 1929, when Weizmann founded the Jewish Agency. Jews were said to seek the destruction of Germany, which was used to justify Nazi attacks against the Jews. Michael Berkowitz writes that the idea of the Jewish Agency as the center of an anti-German conspiracy was "outrageous".

== Postwar ==
Notable postwar writers employing the conspiracy theory include David Irving, a Holocaust denier. German historian Ernst Nolte stated that Weizmann's telegram justified interning Jews in German-occupied Europe as prisoners of war. Furthermore, Weizmann's letter would have plausibly convinced Hitler "of his enemies' determination to annihilate him much earlier than when the first information about Auschwitz came to the knowledge of the world." Nolte's statements were contested by Jürgen Habermas during the Historikerstreit. Deborah Lipstadt wrote that Nolte's argument "lacks any internal logic", since the Nazi persecution of Jews started before 1939, and Weizmann had no armed forces to carry out any "war" against Germany.

The neo-Nazi propaganda film Europa: The Last Battle promotes the claim that Jews started both world wars as part of a plot to establish Israel by forcing the Nazis to act in self-defense.

On April 2026, Peruvian president José María Balcázar said that Jewish people were partially responsible for pushing Nazi Germany into World War II, drawing condemnation from both German and Israeli embassies in Peru.

== See also ==
- Accusation in a mirror
- Antisemitic canard
- Austria victim theory
- Eurabia conspiracy theory
- Genocide justification
- Holocaust inversion
- Secondary antisemitism
- Stab-in-the-back myth
- War on Islam controversy
- Great Replacement conspiracy theory
