= Bloodlands =

Bloodlands or Blood Lands may refer to:

- Bloodlands: Europe Between Hitler and Stalin, a 2010 book by Yale historian Timothy Snyder
- Bloodlands (film), a 2017 Albanian horror film
- Bloodlands (TV series), a 2021 British television drama series
- The Blood Lands, another title for White Settlers, a 2014 British horror film about a London couple who move to Scotland

== See also ==
- Bloodland, Missouri, a former community on the site of Fort Leonart Wood, a US military training installation
- Bloodland Lake virus, a virus found in voles
