= Günther von Kluge =

German field marshal (1882–1944)

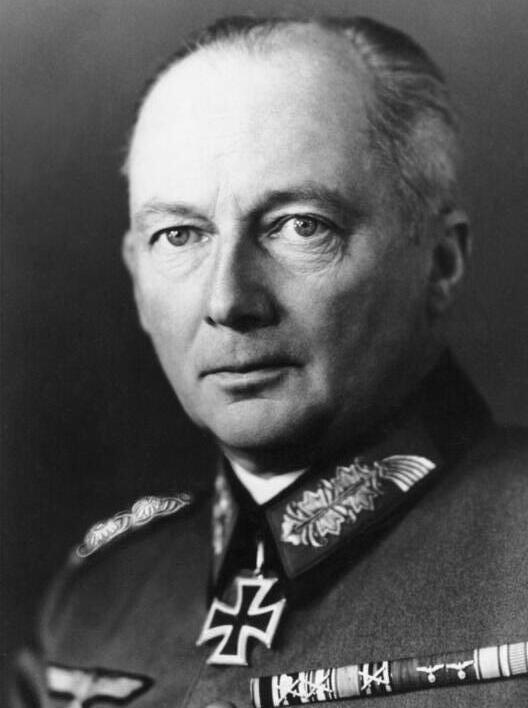
- Kluge in 1939
- Born: Günther Adolf Ferdinand von Kluge; 30 October 1882; Posen, Prussia, Germany
- Died: 19 August 1944 (aged 61); Metz, Germany
- Other name: Hans Günther von Kluge
- Spouse: Mathilde von Briesen (m. 1907)
- Children: 3
- Relatives: Wolfgang von Kluge (brother); Eike-Henner Kluge (grandson)
- Military career
- Allegiance: Germany
- Branch: Imperial German Army; Prussian Army; Reichswehr; German Army
- Service years: 1901–1944
- Rank: Generalfeldmarschall
- Nickname: Clever Hans
- Unit: 46th Field Artillery Regiment
- Commands: 6th Division; VI Army Corps; 4th Army; Army Group Centre; OB West
- Conflicts: World War I; World War II; Invasion of Poland; Battle of France; Operation Barbarossa; Battle of Moscow; Battles of Rzhev; Operation Mars; Operation Büffel; Allied invasion of Normandy; Operation Cobra; Falaise Pocket
- Awards: Knight's Cross of the Iron Cross with Oak Leaves and Swords

Günther Adolf Ferdinand von Kluge (30 October 1882 – 19 August 1944) was a German Generalfeldmarschall (Field Marshal) during World War II. (Note: ‹The template German title von is being considered for deletion.› In German personal names, von is a preposition which approximately means 'of' or 'from' and usually denotes some sort of nobility. While von (always lower case) is part of the family name or territorial designation, not a first or middle name, if the noble is referred to by their last name, use Schiller, Clausewitz or Goethe, not von Schiller, etc.) Kluge held commands on the Eastern and Western Fronts, until his suicide in connection with the 20 July plot.

He commanded the 4th Army of the Wehrmacht during the invasion of Poland in 1939 and the Battle of France in 1940, earning a promotion to Generalfeldmarschall. Kluge went on to command the 4th Army in Operation Barbarossa (the invasion of the Soviet Union) and the Battle for Moscow in 1941. Amid the crisis of the Soviet counter-offensive in December 1941, Kluge was promoted to command Army Group Centre replacing Field Marshal Fedor von Bock. Several members of the German military resistance to Adolf Hitler served on his staff, including Henning von Tresckow. Kluge was aware of the plotters' activities but refused to offer his support unless Hitler was killed. His command on the Eastern Front lasted until October 1943 when Kluge was badly injured in a car accident.

Following a lengthy recuperation, Kluge was appointed OB West (Supreme Commander West) in occupied France in July 1944, after his predecessor, Field Marshal Gerd von Rundstedt, was dismissed for defeatism. Kluge's forces were unable to stop the momentum of the Allied invasion of Normandy, and he began to realise that the war in the West was lost. Although Kluge was not an active conspirator in the 20 July plot, in the aftermath of the failed coup he committed suicide on 19 August 1944, after having been recalled to Berlin for a meeting with Hitler. Kluge was replaced by Field Marshal Walter Model.

== Early life and career ==
Kluge was born on 30 October 1882 in Posen, then in the German state of Prussia (now in western Poland). His father, Max von Kluge, was from an aristocratic Prussian military family. A distinguished commander, Max was a lieutenant general in the German Army who served in the First World War. He married Elise Kühn-Schuhmann in 1881. Günther von Kluge was one of two children, having a younger brother named Wolfgang (1892–1976). Wolfgang served in both world wars, rising to the rank of lieutenant general by 1943, and was commander of Fortress Dunkirk between July and September 1944.

In 1901, Günther von Kluge – sometimes called Hans Günther von Kluge or Der kluge Hans ("Clever Hans") after an alleged performing horse—was commissioned in the German Army's 46th Field Artillery Regiment. He served on the General Staff between 1910 and 1918, reaching the rank of captain on the Western Front during the First World War. He was wounded at Verdun, and later became a captain on the General Staff. He remained in the postwar Reichswehr (national army) during the Weimar era, becoming a colonel in 1930, major general in 1933, and lieutenant general a year later. He was von Brauchitsch's chief of staff in East Prussia in 1933, and was viewed as having subsequently "followed von Brauchitsch's star." On 1 April 1934, Kluge took command of the 6th Division in Münster. In 1935, Adolf Hitler's proclamation of the Wehrmacht—the enlarged German Army—precipitated Kluge's appointment to the 6th Corps and then the 6th Army Group, which subsequently became the 4th Army.

Kluge believed Hitler's "crude militarism" would lead Germany into disaster. During the Sudetenland Crisis, he was a member of a secret anti-war faction led by Ludwig Beck and Ernst von Weizsäcker, hoping to avoid armed conflict over the disputed territory. The crisis was averted by the Munich Agreement on 30 September 1938. Although he was privately critical of the Nazis, Kluge believed in the principle of Lebensraum and took pride in the rearmament of the Wehrmacht.

== World War II ==
=== Invasion of Poland ===
Hitler approved of the German High Command's outline for invading Poland with two army groups during a military briefing on 26–27 April 1939. Kluge's 4th Army was assigned to Army Group North under Fedor von Bock. The Polish campaign commenced on 1 September, taking advantage of the country's long border with Germany. The 4th Army was to advance eastward toward the Corridor from West Pomerania to link with the 3rd Army; the port city of Danzig fell within the first day.

By the following day, apprehensions of a strong Polish defensive line along the Brda River had not materialised. The 4th Army crossed the river, sealing the Polish 9th Infantry Division, 27th Infantry Division, and the Pomeranian Cavalry Brigade in the Corridor. Kluge sent the 10th Panzer Division from his army across the Vistula River, meeting with the 3rd Army on 3 September. The 4th Army's XIX Panzer Corps (Heinz Guderian) captured the city of Brześć on 17 September after three days of fighting in the Battle of Brześć Litewski. Army Group North was informed of the Red Army's invasion of eastern Poland the same day and was directed to remain west of the Bug River. Brześć was turned over to the Soviet forces on 22 September. For his entrapment of Polish forces in the early stages of the invasion, Kluge earned Hitler's praise as one of his most brilliant commanders.

=== Battle of France ===
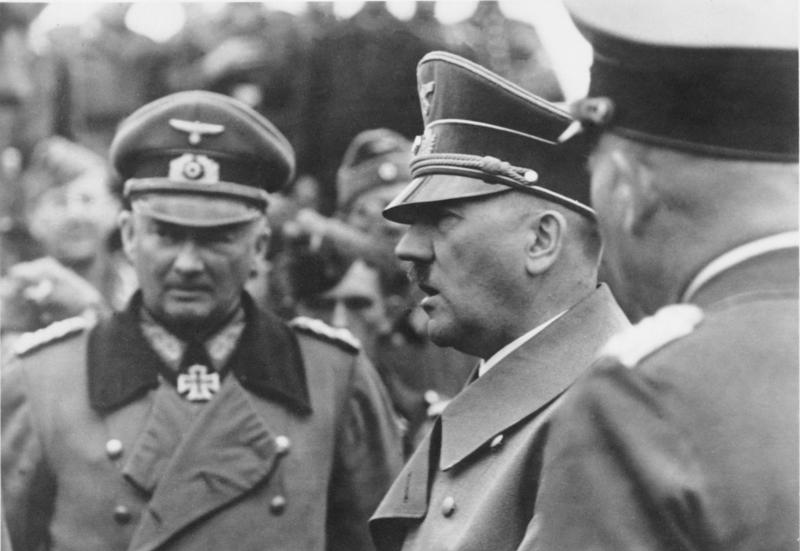
Kluge with Hitler during a troop visit in France, 1940

In preparation for Fall Gelb ("Case Yellow"), the invasion of France, Kluge and the 4th Army were transferred to Army Group A under the command of Gerd von Rundstedt. Hitler, still looking for an aggressive alternative to the original plan, approved Erich von Manstein's ideas, known as the Manstein Plan, following a meeting with them on 17 February 1940. The plan outlined that the 4th Army would contribute to an attack through the rugged Ardennes terrain of southern Belgium and Luxembourg to the Meuse River; Kluge entrusted the XV Army Corps, encompassing the 5th and 7th Panzer Divisions, to provide flank cover for Georg-Hans Reinhardt's corps by crossing the Meuse at Dinant.

Launched on 10 May, Case Yellow began successfully. Kluge's corps advanced rapidly, reaching the Meuse in two days. A river crossing, spearheaded by 7th Panzer commander Erwin Rommel, established a bridgehead on the west bank of the Meuse on 13 May and forced the French 9th Army into retreat. Kluge's forces—particularly the 7th Panzer Division—achieved a rapid breakthrough from their bridgehead in the following days; between 16 and 17 May Rommel captured 10,000 prisoners and 100 tanks, and wiped out the remainder of the French 9th Army at the expense of only 35 casualties. Overextended and well ahead of the army group, the 5th and 7th Panzer Divisions fended off a joint British-French counterattack near the town of Arras on 21 May.

After a conference with Hitler and Rundstedt, Kluge issued an order to his Panzer units to halt on 24 May, 16 km (9.9 mi) from Dunkirk—by then the possible escape route for the British Expeditionary Force. The two-day respite allowed the Allies to consolidate their manpower around Dunkirk and prepare for an evacuation. On 5 June, at the commencement of Fall Rot ("Case Red"), the second phase of the invasion plan, Kluge's 4th Army helped achieve the first breakthrough at Amiens and reached the Seine River on 10 June. Kluge's command and Rommel's generalship throughout the invasion led to his promotion to generalfeldmarschall (field marshal) on 19 July.

=== Invasion of the Soviet Union ===
At the opening of Operation Barbarossa in June 1941, Kluge commanded the 4th Army in Army Group Centre. Army Group Centre (commanded by von Bock) also included the 9th Army (Strauß), and two mobile formations, the 2nd Panzer Group (Heinz Guderian) and the 3rd Panzer Group (Hermann Hoth). On 29 June, Kluge ordered that enemy women in uniform were to be shot, in line with the Nazi ideological world view, which regarded female combatants as yet another manifestation of "barbaric" Bolshevism upending natural gender roles. The order was later rescinded and women in uniform were to be captured instead. On 4 July, OKH subordinated the 2nd and the 3rd Panzer Groups to Kluge, to improve coordination between the fast-charging armoured spearheads and the slower infantry. The resulting formation provided unity on paper, but the Panzer-group commanders often bristled at Kluge's orders, and Guderian and Kluge detested each other. Kluge had to give up all but his two infantry corps; his other corps were assigned to the 2nd Army, which had been held in reserve.

Expecting a short war that would not necessitate the exploitation of Soviet labour for the German war-effort, the German High Command and military leaders did not make adequate preparations to house prisoners-of-war and civilian internees. In Kluge's area of command, 100,000 POWs and 40,000 civilians were herded into a small open-air camp in Minsk in July 1941. Amid deteriorating conditions and starvation in the camp, Organization Todt appealed to Kluge to release 10,000 skilled workers. Kluge declined, wishing to make the decisions regarding the prisoners himself.

The Nazis' Hunger Plan (one of the pillars of the war of annihilation against the Soviet Union), encouraged the Wehrmacht largely to "live off the land". Looting, pillaging, and abuse of the civilian population was rampant, especially in the areas to the rear. In September 1941, Kluge issued an order to his troops aimed at restoring discipline. It stated that it was "high time to put a complete end to the unjustified methods of obtaining supplies, the raids, the plundering trips over vast distances, all the senseless and criminal activity". Kluge threatened harsh measures against those responsible, along with their superior commanders who failed to maintain discipline.

==== Battle of Moscow ====
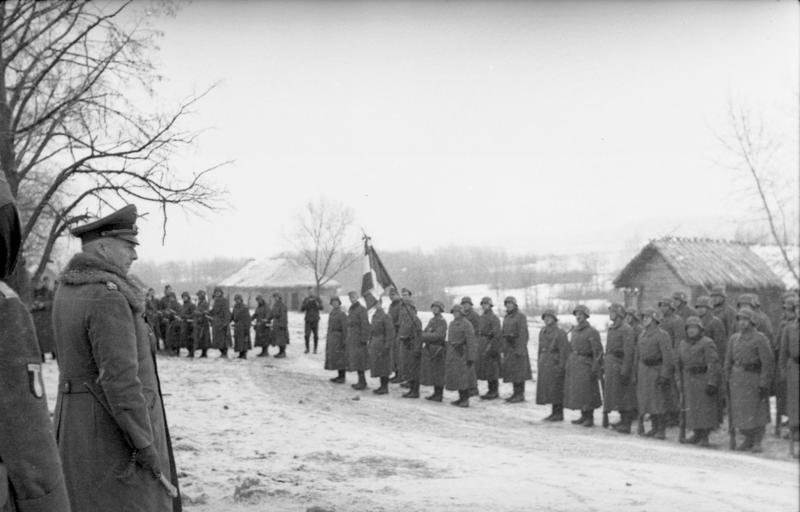
Kluge reviews Légion des Volontaires Français, a French collaborationist formation, November 1941.

During the German advance on Moscow in September to December 1941 (Operation Typhoon), Kluge had the 4th Panzer Group (Erich Hoepner) subordinated to the 4th Army. In early October, the 4th Panzer Group completed the encirclement at Vyazma. Much to Hoepner's displeasure, Kluge instructed him to stop the advance, as his units were needed to prevent break-outs of Soviet forces. Hoepner was confident that clearing the pocket and the advance on Moscow could be undertaken at the same time. He viewed Kluge's actions as interference, which led to friction and "clashes" with his superior, as he wrote in a letter home on 6 October. Hoepner did not seem to appreciate that his units were very short on fuel; the 11th Panzer Division reported having no fuel at all. Only the 20th Panzer Division was advancing towards Moscow amid deteriorating road-conditions.

On 17 November, the 4th Panzer Group again attacked towards Moscow with the V Army Corps of the 4th Army, as part of the continuation of Operation Typhoon by Army Group Centre. The panzer group and the army corps represented Kluge's best forces, most ready for offensive action. In two weeks' fighting, the German forces advanced 60 km (37 mi) (4 km (2.5 mi) per day). A lack of tanks, insufficient motor transport, and a precarious supply situation, along with tenacious Red Army resistance and the air superiority achieved by Soviet fighters, hampered the attack.

Facing pressure from the German High Command, Kluge finally committed his weaker south flank to the attack on 1 December. In the aftermath of the battle, Hoepner and Guderian blamed Kluge's slow commitment of the 4th Army's south flank to the attack for the German failure to reach Moscow. The historian, David Stahel, wrote that this assessment grossly overestimated the capabilities of Kluge's remaining forces. It also failed to appreciate the reality that Moscow was a metropolis and that German forces lacked the numbers to encircle it. With its outer defensive belt completed by 25 November, Moscow was a fortified position which the Wehrmacht lacked the strength to take in a frontal assault. Further attacks were called off on 5 December; the Red Army launched its winter counter-offensive on the same day.

==== Army Group Centre ====
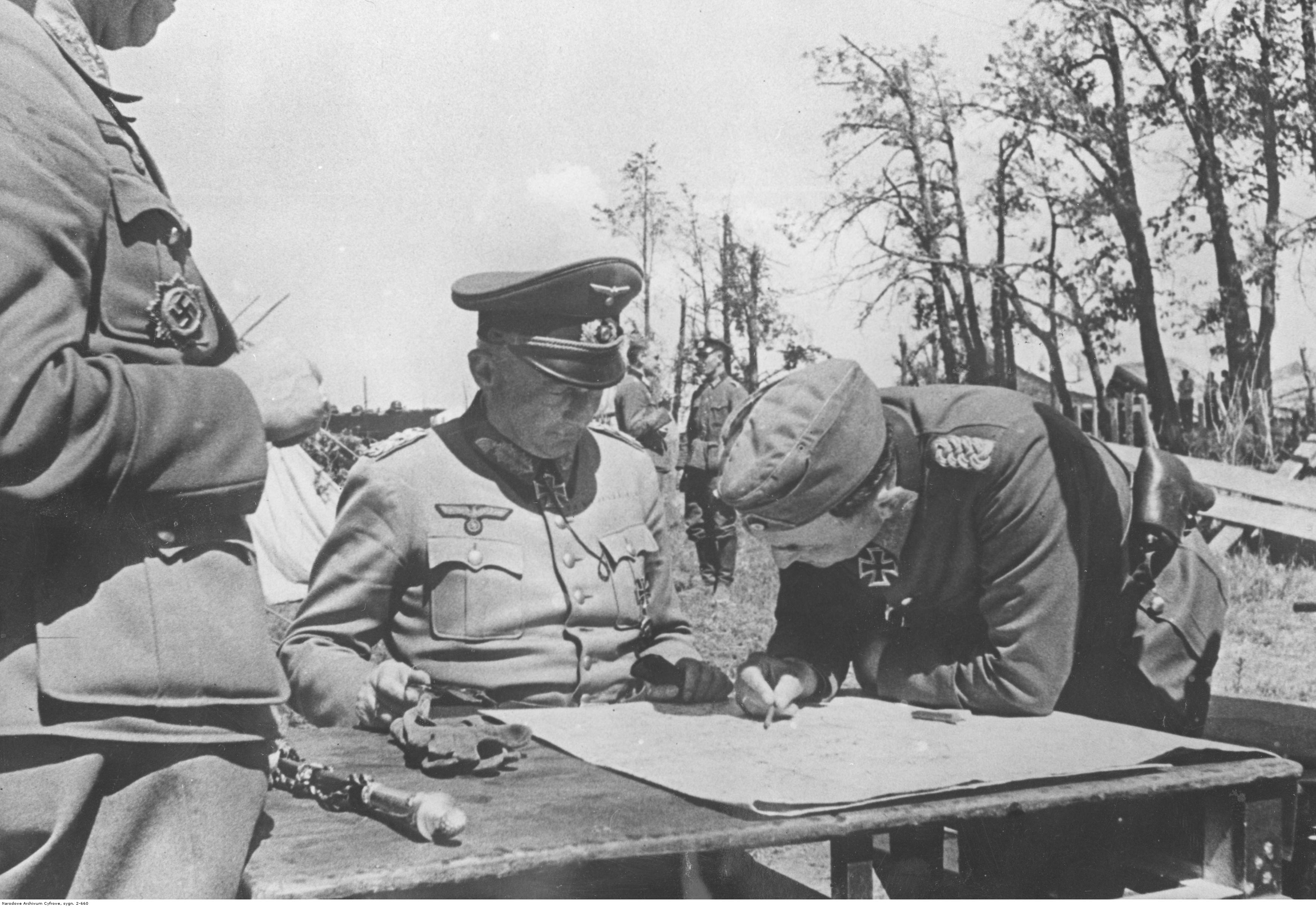
Kluge meets with generals of Army Group Centre, August 1942

After the sacking of Fedor von Bock from the command of Army Group Center on 18 December, Kluge, promoted to replace him, took over on the following day. Bitter fighting continued in the Army Group Center area in the winter and early spring, with neither side being able to make much headway. The German forces held, but barely. During the summer campaign of 1942 in the south of the Soviet Union (Case Blue), the army group was to hold its position.

On 30 October 1942, Kluge received a letter of good wishes from Hitler, together with a cheque for a half-million Reichsmarks made out to him from the German treasury. (Note: At the time, 500,000 Reichsmarks were worth approximately $200,000 US dollars or £50,000.) The letter included a promise that the costs of improving his estate could be billed to the state. This was part of the scheme for the bribery of senior military officers. Kluge took the money; after severe criticism from his chief of staff, Henning von Tresckow, who upbraided him for corruption, he agreed to meet Carl Friedrich Goerdeler, an opponent of the Nazi régime, in November 1942. Kluge promised Goerdeler that he would arrest Hitler the next time he came to the Eastern Front. Then, after receiving another "gift" from Hitler, he changed his mind and decided to remain loyal. Hitler, who seems to have heard that Kluge was dissatisfied with his leadership, regarded his "gifts" as entitling him to Kluge's total loyalty.

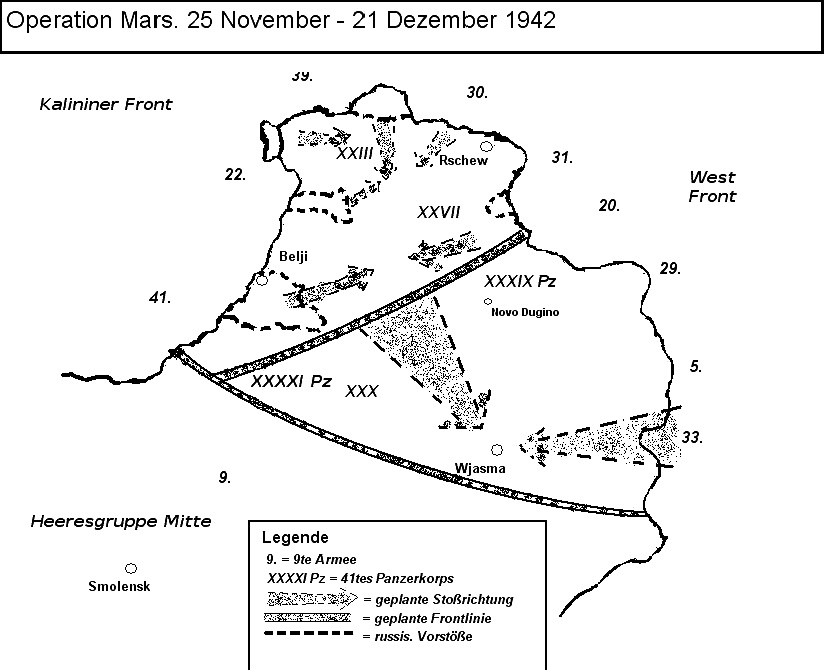
Soviet plans for the unsuccessful Operation Mars against the Rzhev salient, November – December 1942. The Wehrmacht abandoned the salient in Operation Büffel, 1–22 March 1943.

For much of 1942 and early 1943, Army Group Centre engaged in positional warfare around the Rzhev salient, defending against the Red Army offensives collectively known as the Battles of Rzhev (January 1942 to March 1943). The Soviet forces gained little ground for their losses, especially in the unsuccessful Operation Mars (November to December 1942) that commenced around the same time as Operation Uranus, the encirclement of the German forces in the Battle of Stalingrad. Kluge's forces had been depleted, and early in 1943 he obtained authorisation to withdraw the 9th Army (General Walter Model) and elements of the 4th Army (General Gotthard Heinrici) from the salient. The resulting Operation Büffel saw the Wehrmacht abandon the salient methodically between 1 and 22 March 1943. The operation eliminated the Rzhev salient, shortening the German lines by 370 km (230 mi). The withdrawal was accompanied by a ruthless scorched-earth and security campaign, resulting in widespread destruction, razing of villages, deportation of the able-bodied population for slave-labour and killings of civilians by the troops of the Wehrmacht under the guise of Bandenbekämpfung (anti-partisan warfare).

On 13 March 1943, Hitler authorised several offensives, including one against the Kursk salient. As the last Soviet resistance in the Third Battle of Kharkov (February to March 1943) petered out, Erich von Manstein, commander of Army Group South, attempted to persuade Kluge to launch an attack immediately on the Soviet Central Front, which was defending the northern face of the salient. Kluge refused, believing that his forces were too weak to launch such an attack. By mid-April, amid poor weather and with the German forces exhausted and in need of refitting, the Axis offensives were postponed.

On 15 April, Hitler and the OKH issued a new operational order, which called for the offensive against the Kursk salient, Unternehmen Zitadelle (Operation Citadel), to begin around 3 May 1943. Citadel, which led to the Battle of Kursk, called for a pincer movement (double envelopment). Army Group Centre was to provide the 9th Army to form the northern pincer. The 4th Panzer Army and Army Detachment Kempf of Army Group South would drive north to meet the 9th Army east of Kursk. As the preparations continued, in late April, Model met with Hitler to express his concerns about strong defensive positions being established by the Red Army in his sector.

Hitler called his senior officers and advisors to Munich for a meeting on 4 May. Participants submitted a number of options: going on the offensive immediately with the forces at hand, delaying the offensive further to await the arrival of new and better tanks, radically revising the operation or cancelling it altogether. Manstein advocated an early attack but requested two additional infantry divisions, to which Hitler responded that none were available. Kluge spoke out strongly against postponement and discounted Model's reconnaissance materials. Guderian, by now the Inspector of Armoured Forces, argued against the operation, stating "the attack was pointless". The conference ended without Hitler coming to a decision, but Citadel was not cancelled.

The German operation, launched on 5 July, misfired from the start. In the northern sector, the Soviet forces had halted the German advance by 10 July. On 12 July, the Red Army launched Operation Kutuzov, its counter-offensive against the Orel salient, which threatened the flank and rear of the 9th Army. On the evening of 12 July, Hitler summoned Kluge and Manstein to his headquarters at Rastenburg in East Prussia, where he announced the cancellation of Citadel. Amid heavy fighting, the Red Army entered Orel on 5 August, and on 18 August reached the outskirts of Bryansk, eliminating the Orel salient. With Army Group Center falling back on defensive positions, the German resistance stiffened, and it took the Soviet forces until the end of September to liberate Smolensk. On 27 October 1943, Kluge was badly injured in a car accident and was unable to return to duty until July 1944. Field Marshal Ernst Busch replaced Kluge as commander of Army Group Centre.

=== Western Front ===
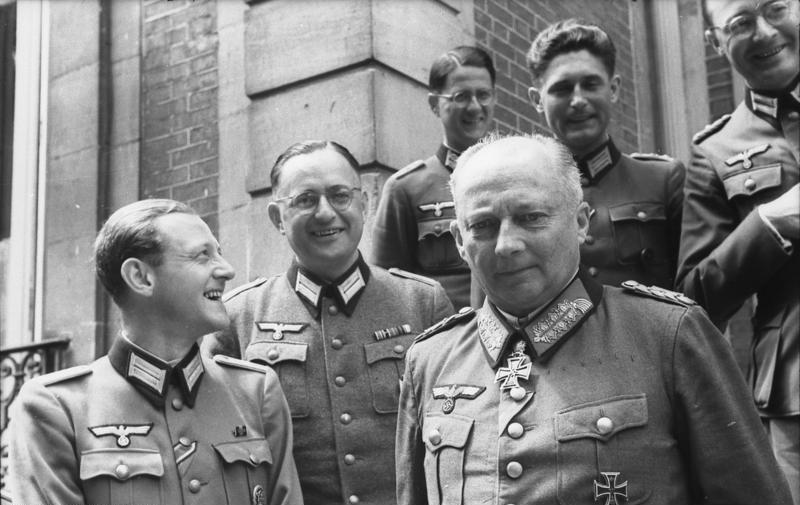
Kluge with other German officers of OB West in France, July 1944

In July 1944, Kluge was appointed OB West (Commander of the German Army in the West) after his predecessor, Field Marshal Gerd von Rundstedt, was dismissed for remarking that the war was lost. With the initiative belonging to the Allies, Kluge immediately sought to assert authority over Rommel, in charge of Army Group B and build his command's confidence in defending Normandy. Yet by 12 July, having toured the front and been briefed by field commanders, Kluge expressed his scepticism to Alfred Jodl: "I am no pessimist. But in my view, the situation could not be grimmer". Five days later, Rommel was wounded when a Royal Canadian Air Force (RCAF) Spitfire strafed his staff car, causing the vehicle to veer off the road; Kluge succeeded him in command of Army Group B while retaining his other post.

The Allies drove the Germans from the vital heights of Saint-Lô in July, setting the stage for a major offensive in the Normandy Campaign. Launched on 25 July, Operation Cobra was intended for US forces to take advantage of German armies occupied by British and Canadian attacks around Caen and achieve a breakthrough in northwestern France. By 28 July, the operation succeeded in breaking through German lines, and resistance to the Americans was disorganised. Lacking the resources to hold the front, German units launched desperate counterattacks to escape entrapment, while Kluge sent reinforcements, comprising elements of the 2nd Panzer Division and 116th Panzer Division, westwards in hopes of avoiding a collapse; in fierce engagements, his forces suffered severe losses in men and tanks that he could not replace.

In the last days of July, the German army in Normandy had been reduced to such a poor state by Allied offensives that Kluge could no longer sustain the defence of Normandy; he had no prospects for reinforcements in the wake of Operation Bagration, the Soviet summer offensive against Army Group Centre and very few Germans believed they could salvage victory. Between 1 and 4 August, seven divisions from the US Third Army, under Lieutenant General George S. Patton, advanced rapidly through Avranches and over the bridge at Pontaubault into Brittany.

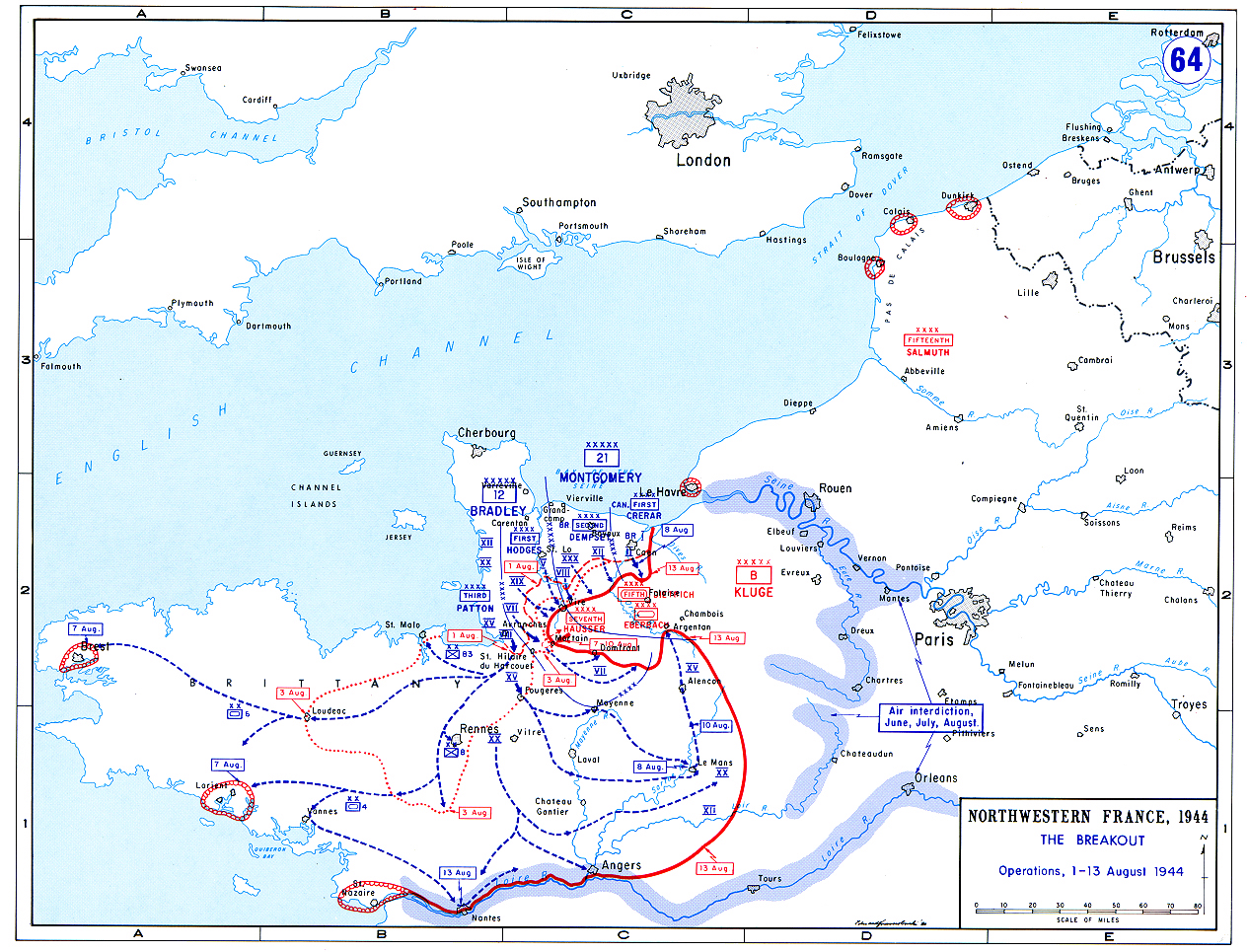
Allied break-out from the Normandy beachheads, 1 – 13 August 1944

Against Kluge's advice to withdraw, Hitler ordered a counterattack, Operation Lüttich, between Mortain and Avranches. He demanded that all available Panzer units cooperate in a concentrated attack aimed at recapturing the Contentin Peninsula and cutting off US forces in Brittany from their supplies. According to OB West Operations Officer Bodo Zimmermann, Kluge knew "very well that carrying out this order meant the collapse of the Normandy front" but his misgivings were ignored. Kluge could only muster four depleted Panzer divisions by the time operations commenced on 7 August. The offensive came to a halt 15 km (9.3 mi) from Avaranches, primarily due to Allied air superiority, leaving German units vulnerable to entrapment.

A final offensive, Operation Tractable, was launched by Canadian forces on 14 August in conjunction with American advances northwards to Chambois; their goal was to encircle and destroy the 7th Army and 5th Panzer Army near the town of Falaise. In his final order as OB West commander, Kluge issued a full-scale retreat eastward on 16 August. The Allies did not capture Falaise until later that same day, leaving a 24 km (15 mi)-gap between Canadian and American forces—known as the Falaise Gap. By 22 August, the gap—desperately maintained by the Germans to allow their forces to escape—was sealed, ending that part of the Battle of Normandy with an Allied victory. As remnants of Army Group B fled eastwards, the Allies advanced without opposition. Although perhaps 100,000 Germans managed to escape, 10,000 were killed and another 40,000–50,000 were captured.

=== Bomb Plot and death ===
Through Carl-Heinrich von Stülpnagel, Kluge was aware of the 20 July plot against Hitler; he agreed to support the conspirators' seizure of power if Hitler was killed. In Paris, the conspirators arrested over 1,200 SS and SD members, and after the assassination attempt failed, Stülpnagel and Caesar von Hofacker met with Kluge at his headquarters in La Roche-Guyon. Having already learned of Hitler's survival, Kluge withdrew his support and rescinded the arrest warrants. On 15 August, Kluge's car was damaged in an Allied bombing raid and he was cut off from his forces for several hours. Hitler immediately suspected Kluge of negotiating with the Allies. He was dismissed two days later and replaced by Model. When he was recalled to Berlin for a meeting with Hitler, Kluge was convinced he had been implicated in the 20 July plot and opted to commit suicide on 19 August using potassium cyanide. In his final testimony, he affirmed his loyalty to Hitler and expressed the view that Germany needed to end the war, writing that "the German people have undergone such untold suffering that it is time to put an end to this frightfulness".

SS General Jürgen Stroop claimed to have offered the Field Marshal a choice between suicide and a show trial before Judge Freisler. To Stroop’s outrage, Kluge demanded his day in court. Stroop then claimed he shot Kluge in the head. Himmler announced the death of the Field Marshal was a suicide.

== Awards ==
- Iron Cross (1914) 2nd and 1st class
- Knight's Cross of the House Order of Hohenzollern with Swords
- Clasp to the Iron Cross (1939) 2nd class (5 September 1939) & 1st class
- Knight's Cross of the Iron Cross with Oak Leaves and Swords
  - Knight's Cross on 30 September 1939 and commander of the 4th Army
  - Oak Leaves on 18 January 1943 as commander of Army Group Center
  - Swords on 29 October 1943 as commander of Army Group Center

== Notes ==
=== Bibliography ===
- Barnett, Correlli (1989). Hitler's Generals. Grove Weidenfeld Publications. ISBN 1-55584-161-9.
- Boog, Horst; Förster, Jürgen; Hoffmann, Joachim; Klink, Ernst; Müller, Rolf-Dieter; Ueberschär, Gerd R., eds. (1998). "The Army and the Navy". Germany and the Second World War: Attack on the Soviet Union. Vol. IV. Oxford and New York: Clarendon Press. ISBN 978-0-19-822886-8.
- Citino, Robert (2007). Death of the Wehrmacht: The German Campaigns of 1942. University Press of Kansas. ISBN 978-0-7006-1531-5.
- Citino, Robert M. (2012). The Wehrmacht Retreats: Fighting a Lost War, 1943. Lawrence, KS: University Press of Kansas. ISBN 978-0-7006-1826-2.
- Clark, Lloyd (2012). Kursk: The Greatest Battle: Eastern Front 1943. London: Headline Publishing Group. ISBN 978-0-7553-3639-5.
- D'Este, Carlo (1983). Decision in Normandy. Konecky & Konecky. ISBN 1-56852-260-6.
- Förster, Jürgen (1998). "Securing 'Living Space'". In Boog, Horst; Förster, Jürgen; Hoffmann, Joachim; Klink, Ernst; Müller, Rolf-Dieter; Ueberschär, Gerd R. (eds.). Germany and the Second World War: Attack on the Soviet Union. Vol. IV. Oxford and New York: Clarendon Press. ISBN 978-0-19-822886-8.
- Glantz, David; House, Jonathan (2015). When Titans Clashed: How the Red Army Stopped Hitler. University Press of Kansas. ISBN 978-070062121-7.
- Glantz, David M.; House, Jonathan M. (2004) [First published 1999]. The Battle of Kursk. Lawrence, Kansas: University Press of Kansas. ISBN 978-070061335-9.
- Graeger, Rüdiger (1998). "Field Marshal Gunther von Kluge as C-in-C West in 1944". RUSI Journal. 143 (5): 59–66. doi:10.1080/03071849808446312.
- "Hans Günther von Kluge 1882-1944". Deutsches Historisches Museum. 14 September 2014. Archived from the original on 3 January 2019.
- Hastings, Max (1984). Overlord D-Day and the Battle for Normandy. Michael Joseph Ltd. ISBN 0-671-46029-3.
- "Historical currency converter". historicalstatistics.org. Archived from the original on 4 April 2018.
- Hoffman, Peter (1977). The History of the German Resistance, 1939–1945. MA: MIT Press. ISBN 978-0-262-08088-0.
- Horne, Alistair (1969). To Lose a Battle: France 1940. Macmillan London. ISBN 978-0-141-03065-4.
- Hürter, Johannes (2007). Hitlers Heerführer. Die deutschen Oberbefehlshaber im Krieg gegen die Sowjetunion 1941/42 [Hitler's army commander. The German commander-in-chief in the war against the Soviet Union 1941/42]. Oldenbourg Verlag. ISBN 978-3-486-57982-6.
- Kennedy, Robert M. (2015). The German Campaign in Poland (1939). Merriam Press. ISBN 978-157638364-3.
- Kinder, Sebastian; Porada, Haik Thomas (2017). Das Havelland um Rathenow und Premnitz: Eine landeskundliche Bestandsaufnahme (in German) (2nd ed.). Böhlau Köln. ISBN 978-341222297-0.
- Knopp, Guido (2007). Die Wehrmacht: Eine Bilanz (in German). München: C. Bertelsmann Verlag. ISBN 978-3-570-00975-8.
- Margaritis, Peter (2019). Countdown to D-Day: The German Perspective. Oxford & PA, USA: Casemate. p. 29. ISBN 978-1-61200-769-4.
- Mawdsley, Evan (2005). Thunder in the East: the Nazi-Soviet War, 1941–1945. Hodder Arnold. p. 502. ISBN 0-340-80808-X.
- Megargee, Geoffrey P. (2006). War of Annihilation: Combat and Genocide on the Eastern Front, 1941. Rowman & Littlefield. ISBN 978-0-7425-4482-6.
- Mitcham, Samuel W. (2008). Rommel's Desert Commanders: The Men Who Served the Desert Fox, North Africa, 1941-42. Stackpole Books. ISBN 978-0-8117-3510-0.
- Mitcham, Samuel W. Jr (1988). Hitler's Field Marshals and Their Battles. London, United Kingdom: Guild Publishing. OCLC 220632577.
- Müller, Rolf-Dieter (1998). "Failure of the Economic 'Blitzkrieg'". In Boog, Horst; Förster, Jürgen; Hoffmann, Joachim; Klink, Ernst; Müller, Rolf-Dieter; Ueberschär, Gerd R. (eds.). Germany and the Second World War: Attack on the Soviet Union. Vol. IV. Oxford and New York: Clarendon Press. ISBN 978-0-19-822886-8.
- Newton, Steven (2002). Kursk: The German View. Cambridge: Da Capo Press. ISBN 0-306-81150-2.
- Newton, Steven H. (2006). Hitler's Commander: Field Marshal Walter Model – Hitler's Favorite General. Cambridge, MA: Da Capo Press. ISBN 978-0-306-81399-3.
- Overy, Richard (1995). Why the Allies Won. New York: Norton Press. ISBN 978-0-393-03925-2.
- Reuth, Ralf Georg (2005). Rommel: The End of a Legend. London: Haus Books. ISBN 978-1-904950-20-2.
- Scherzer, Veit (2007). Die Ritterkreuzträger 1939–1945 [The Knight's Cross Bearers 1939–1945] (in German). Jena, Germany: Scherzers Militaer-Verlag. ISBN 978-3-938845-17-2.
- Shirer, William L. (1990). The Rise and Fall of the Third Reich. New York: Simon & Schuster. ISBN 0-671-72868-7.
- Showalter, Dennis E. (2013). Armor and Blood: The Battle of Kursk, The Turning Point of World War II. New York, USA: Random House. ISBN 978-1-4000-6677-3.
- "Siegen helfen, Das Schreckbild der sowjetischen "Flintenweiber"". Die Zeit (in German). 24 May 2011. Archived from the original on 12 August 2018.
- Stahel, David (2013). Operation Typhoon: Hitler's March on Moscow, October 1941. Cambridge University Press. ISBN 978-1107035-12-6.
- Stahel, David (2015). The Battle for Moscow. Cambridge: Cambridge University Press. ISBN 978-1-107-08760-6.
- Stargardt, Nicholas (2015). The German War: A Nation Under Arms, 1939–1945. New York: Basic Books. ISBN 978-0-465-01899-4.
- Thomas, Franz (1997). Die Eichenlaubträger 1939–1945 Band 1: A–K [The Oak Leaves Bearers 1939–1945 Volume 1: A–K] (in German). Osnabrück, Germany: Biblio-Verlag. ISBN 978-3-7648-2299-6.
- Wheeler-Bennett, Sir John (2005) [First published 1953]. The Nemesis of Power: German Army in Politics, 1918 – 1945. New York: Palgrave Macmillan Publishing Company. ISBN 978-1-4039-1812-3.

Military offices
Preceded by none	Commander of 4th Army; 1 December 1938 – 19 December 1941	Succeeded by General der Gebirgstruppe Ludwig Kübler
Preceded by Field Marshal Fedor von Bock	Commander of Army Group Centre; 19 December 1941 – 12 October 1943	Succeeded by Field Marshal Ernst Busch
Preceded by Field Marshal Gerd von Rundstedt	Commander of Army Group D 2 July 1944 – 15 August 1944	Succeeded by Field Marshal Gerd von Rundstedt
Preceded by Field Marshal Gerd von Rundstedt	OB West; 2 July 1944 – 16 August 1944	Succeeded by Field Marshal Walter Model
Preceded by Field Marshal Erwin Rommel	Commander of Army Group B 19 July 1944 – 17 August 1944	Succeeded by Field Marshal Walter Model
