= Nim Vind =

Canadian musician and songwriter

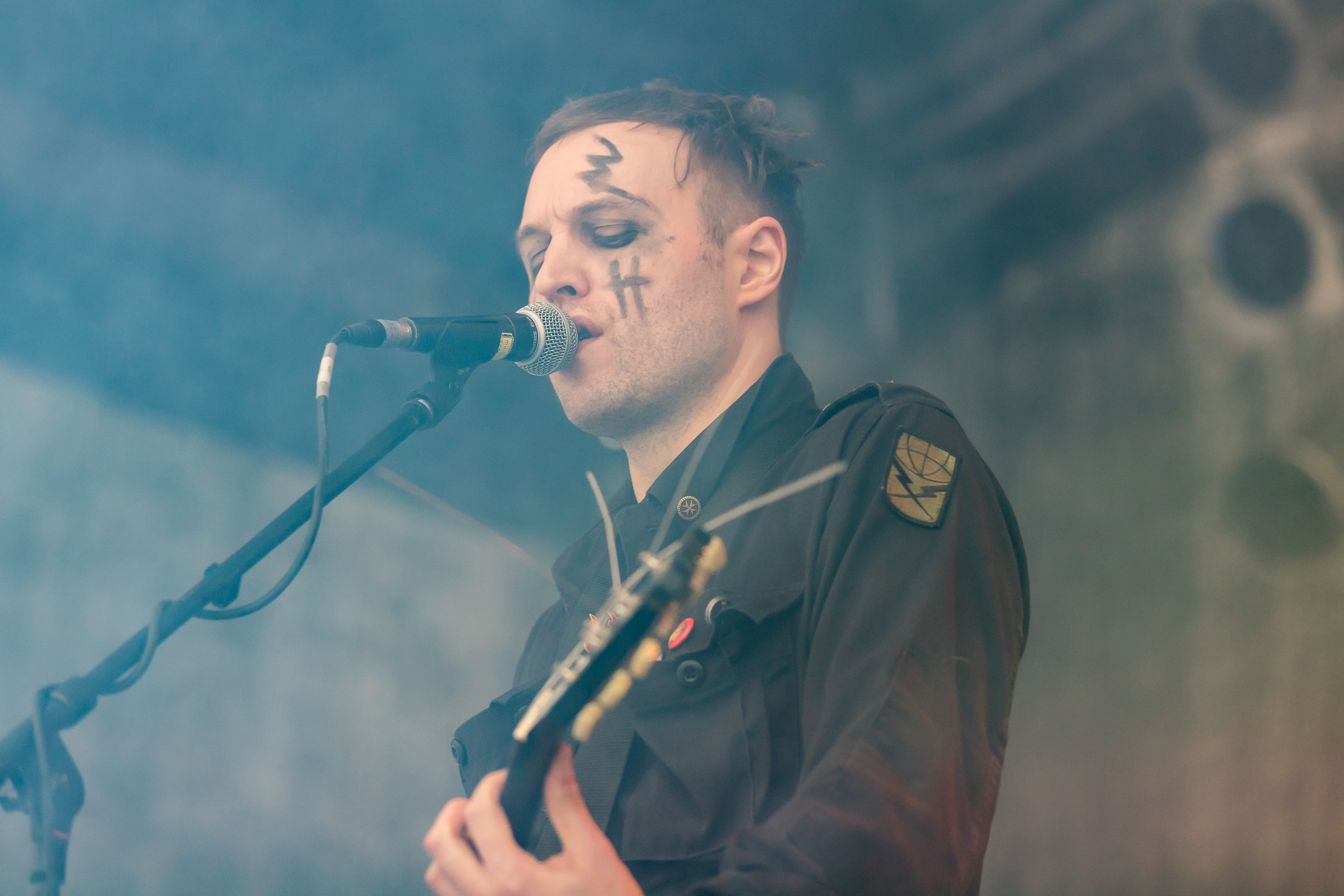

Background information
- Born: Chris Kirkham
- Origin: Vancouver, British Columbia, Canada
- Labels: FiendForce; Silverdust; BEEF; Nv Music
- Members: Nim Vind; Anthony Kilz; Other members Robbie K Howie Wowie; Ian Josephson; Joseph Blood
- Website: nimvindstore.bigcartel.com

Nim Vind (born Chris Kirkham) is a Canadian solo musician/artist and songwriter, who has also played in Mr. Underhill and The Vincent Black Shadow. He describes his sound as "Music for Outsiders". His music has no specific genre but is sometimes referred to as horror punk.

Nim Vind has been compared to the Misfits Social Distortion and Volbeat in the press. He often mentions David Bowie as a major influence.

He has released three albums: The Fashion of Fear (2005) on Fiendforce Records and Nv Music, The Stillness Illness (2009) on Silverdust Records and Soulfood Distro/Nv Music, and Saturday Night Seance Songs on House of Vind with Allegro USA distro. Seance features mixes from Jay Ruston and producer Todd Rundgren. Saturday Night Seance Songs was "Album of the Year" in Rue Morgue magazine.

Nim Vind was managed by Jon Zazula and also Eric Gardner – Panacea Entertainment.

== "Nim Vind" meaning ==
Nim Vind is a made up name out of a combination of sounds and symbols. Specifically it is to be thought of as a character's name. A definition of "Nim Vind" is freedom by insanity. "Nim" borrows symbolism from the acronym for the National Institute of Mental Health or N.I.M.H. "Vind" borrows symbolism from the word "vindication", representing justification against denial or censure. The strange name is meant to sound alien or somewhat Extra-Terrestrial representing being outside the norm. Another definition is "aNIMal VINDication".

=== Career and recordings as Nim Vind ===
Chris Kirkham recorded the first Nim Vind album The Fashion of Fear and signed with Germany's Fiendforce Records in 2005. He completed tour cycles in Europe in 2005, 2006, 2007. He released his second album "Stillness Illness" in 2009 with Silverdust Records Europe and played on the "Pain Stage" at the Sold Out Summer Breeze Open Air festival in Germany. 2009 included club touring with Creepshow, Blitzkid, a second appearance with New Model Army, SNFU and more.

2010 and 2011 saw more European club touring including a tour with American band Filter, and second appearance at the Wave-Gottik-Treffen at Work 2 with the Misfits in Leipzig, Germany.

Touring in America in 2013 included Tiger Army's October Flame Festival Anaheim USA, Steel Panther at House of Blues in Hollywood and more.

In 2014, Nim released the Saturday Night Seance Songs album. "Astronomicon" was premiered worldwide by Alternative Press magazine. The track "Master Spider" was premiered worldwide by BloodDisgusting.com, a horror entertainment website. The album was named "Album of the Year" by Rue Morgue magazine, a worldwide print horror entertainment magazine.

Touring for Saturday Night Seance Songs included a Halloween tour with Gary Numan, Canadian dates with Green Jelly, Doyle from Misfits, European dates with 69 Eyes, European dates with goth legends Christian Death, and Multiple European club tours going through to 2017.

Nim did a Europe festival run including his second appearance at Summer Breeze in 2016. In 2017, he made his third appearance at The Wave Gotik Treffen and released an official video for "Renegades of the End Times". It was shot in Canada and Los Angeles, USA.

In 2017, Nim performed in Russia for the first time, visiting Moscow and St.Petersburg during a European club touring. The "War of the Worlds" video included tour footage from Russia and Europe. A fan video for "That Girl" was posted as a tribute to power girls of horror movies.

2018 Nim completed a full North American Tour with Michale Graves and Argyle Goolsby.

In August 2018, Nim Vind collaborated with writer/director Jeff Frumess to produce a video for the song "Fear O Fear." The video features scenes from Frumess' feature length Gothic-Thriller, Romeo's Distress.

In 2019, Nim released "White Magic", a tribute combining David Bowie's songs "Magic Dance" and "Dead Man Walking". The single "Sagittarius" was released in 2019, inspired by the Black Hole of Sagittarius A*. The accompanying video was shot in Canada and edited by LA Photographer Michelle Xstar.

=== Previous band: Mr. Underhill ===
Chris Kirkham a.k.a. Nim Vind started his first band called Mr. Underhill. The idea for the sound of the band was to mix the dark art of Bauhaus with the catchy melodies and angst of the Misfits. It originally featured Nim Vind and two other players, but Nim's real life brothers Robbie and Anthony would both soon join. There are three Mr.Underhill EPs that were only sold at shows and speciality stores. The first was Vamp, which leaned towards the Bauhaus/Bowie side of their sound. That was followed shortly after by the third EP Phantasm Drive-In, which leaned more in a Misfits direction and was the beginning of Nim and his brothers finding their sound. Mr.Underhill gained a strong cult following thanks largely to word of mouth and websites like the original Mp3.com in which they were a prominently featured band. They were especially known for their eccentric outfits made up of giant black hair, long black coats and smeared black make-up, as well as their underground hit "Phantasm Drive-In". Mr.Underhill ended and two bands were formed being Nim Vind (Chris's band) and The Vincent Black Shadow (Rob's).

A third album of lost material was recorded but never released. However, as of December 25, 2013, it was restored, remixed, and released as Nim Vind and Mr.Underhill - The World through X-ray Eyes.

=== The Vincent Black Shadow ===
Rob's band The Vincent Black Shadow incorporated the brothers and enjoyed success at major American radio with the single "Metro". TVBS, as it is referred to by fans, was managed by Jonny Z who signed Metallica, and completed back to back full summers of "The Vans Warped Tour", Joan Jett dates including sold-out shows at Irving Plaza New York, a sold out Euro tour with Kosheen, a sold out Euro tour with fellow Canadian band Silverstein as well as live performances on Much Music, FUSE TV USA, and others.

== Discography ==
Nim Vind discography
- Studio albums: 3
- Singles: 5
- Music videos: 11

=== Studio albums ===
Year	Album details
2005	Fashion Of Fear: Released: Summer 2005 and 2008 on iTunes; Label: FiendForce Records and Nv Music; 1. The Fashion of Fear – 3:20; 2. Saturday Night Creepers – 2:29; 3. Killer Creature Double Feature – 2:00; 4. Outsiders – 3:18; 5. Blue Movies – 2:58; 6. In the Night – 2:40; 7. The Midnight Croon – 1:48; 8. Like a Guilloteen – 4:01; 9. Into the Sphere We Go – 3:08; 10. The Bitter End – 3:29
2009	The Stillness Illness: Released: June 2009; Label: Silverdust Records and Nim Vind Music; 1. Killing Saturday Night; 2. Character Assassination; 3. Hadron Collider; 4. Jackknife; 5. The 21st Century; 6. Suicide Pact; 7. The Radio Active Man; 8. Revenge; 9. Blood Clots...Rise of the Police State; 10. The Clawed Bat; 11. Shango Nitra; 12. The Message; 13. The Still Blue - This track is only on the Euro version
2014	Saturday Night Seance Songs: Released: October 14, 2014; Label: House of Vind; 1. ESP; 2. Where I'm From; 3. Renegades of the End Times; 4. That Girl; 5. Electric Countershock Resuscitation; 6. Master Spider; 7. Astronomicon - mixed by Todd Rundgren; 8. The Philistine Beat; 9. War of the Worlds; 10. Fear O Fear; 11. The 21st Century LIVE in Germany; 12. Wolfsbane Blues

=== Singles ===
Year	Single
2008	"Killing Saturday Night Single"
2017	"Jackknife" - Mixed by Andreas Frank
2019	"ESP" - Mixed by Nic Kartchner
2019	"White Magic" - Cover of David Bowie's "Magic Dance" and "Dead Man Walking"
2019	"Sagittarius"
2020	"Killing Jokes"
2020	"Astronomicon"
2020	"Radioactive Man"
2020	"Hadron Collider: Multiverse"
2021	"Folsom Prison Blues"
2022	"Mack the Knife"
2022	"Down the Roads of a Wrecked Mind"
2023	"U F O (feat. The Psychic Rhythm"

=== Official video singles ===
Year	Single
2006	"In the Night - Live at the Royal Hotel"
2006	"Blue Movies - Live Acoustic for Dark Canada doc."
2010	"Live Acoustic Halloween Sessions - Jackknife, Killing Saturday Night, The Radio Active Man
2010	"Killing Saturday Night Single" - Filmed and Edited by Thomas Buchan
2010	"21st Century.- Live at Summer Breeze Open Air Germany"
2015	"ESP" - Edited by Donavyn Peters
2016	"Renegades of the End Times" - Edited by Michelle XStar
2017	"Where I'm From" - Edited by Michelle XStar
2017	"War of the Worlds" - Directed by Jeff Frumess
2018	"Fear O Fear" - Directed by Jeff Frumess, featuring scenes from Romeo's Distress
2019	"Sagittarius" - Edited by Michelle XStar
