= The Vincent Black Shadow =

Canadian alternative rock band

- Origin: Vancouver, British Columbia, Canada
- Genres: Alternative, Pop rock
- Years active: 2003–present
- Labels: Bodog Records; Beef Records
- Members: Nikki Hurst; Rob Kirkham; Anthony Kirkham; Chris Kirkham
- Past members: Cassandra Ford; Mary Ancheta

The Vincent Black Shadow (also known as TVBS) is a Canadian alternative rock band that was signed to the Bodog record label in 2006 and to Beef Records in 2008. Originally consisting of Cassandra Ford on vocals, brothers Rob Kirkham on guitar, Anthony Kirkham on drums, and Chris Kirkham on bass, with Mary Ancheta on keyboards. As of 2010, Nikki Hurst replaced Ford as lead vocalist when Ford expressed interest in taking a break to go to school. The new line up however remained the same and Ford decided to work on other musical projects minus the Kirkham brothers. The name is derived from the motorcycle of the same name, the Vincent Black Shadow. Fears in the Water was first released on July 11, 2006, and their sophomore effort, El Monstruo, on September 15, 2008. Their latest creation, an EP entitled The Finest Crime was released via iTunes on Valentine's Day 2011.

== History ==
The Vancouver quintet was formed by Cassandra Ford and Rob Kirkham. In 2000, the two met at a bar, becoming musical collaborators from then on. Kirkham then recruited his two brothers Chris and Anthony Kirkham. The brothers had extensive musical training from their father, a trumpet player for the Vancouver Symphony Orchestra. Finally, Mary Ancheta joined the group later on. The band signed to the Bodog record label in 2006.

In 2007, The Vincent Black Shadow played on the Vans Warped Tour having 'rocked' it the previous year. The Vincent Black Shadow have also toured with Wednesday 13, Joan Jett, Halifax, Greeley Estates, Bif Naked, Kosheen, and Snow Patrol. Following on they have also appeared on bills with Silverstein and Blessthefall among other bands. In August 2008 the band announced in an e-mail sent out to fans that they had parted ways with Bodog Music, and were releasing their sophomore effort El Monstruo through Beef Records on September 15, 2008. On December 8, 2008, the EP Head In a Box was released on the band's official website as a digital only release. The songs included on Head In a Box are B-sides from El Monstruo. Cassandra Ford left the band in early 2010 and was replaced by vocalist Nikki Hurst, the band's original keyboard player.

== Band members ==
Current

- Nikki Hurst – lead vocals (since 2010)
- Rob Kirkham – guitars (since 2006)
- Anthony Kirkham – drums, percussion (since 2006)
- Chris Kirkham – bass guitar (since 2006)

Former

- Cassandra Ford - lead vocals (2006–2010)
- Mary Ancheta - keyboards, backing vocals (2007)

== Discography ==
The Vincent Black Shadow discography
- Studio albums: 2
- Extended plays: 2
- Singles: 4
- Music videos: 4

=== Studio albums ===
Year	Album details	Peak chart positions		
Year	Album details	The Billboard 200	Top Heatseekers	Top Rock Albums
2006	Fears in the Water: Released: July 25, 2006; Label: Bodog Music	-	-	-
2008	El Monstruo: Released: October 27, 2008; Label: Beef Records	-	-	-

=== EP's ===
Year	EP details	Peak chart positions		
Year	EP details	The Billboard 200	Top Heatseekers	Top Rock Albums
2008	Head In a Box: Released: December 8, 2008; Label: Beef Records	-	-	-
2011	The Finest Crime: Released: February 14, 2011; Label: Beef Records	-	-	-

=== Singles ===
Year	Title	Album
2006	"Metro"	Fears in the Water
2007	"Control"	Fears in the Water
2007	"Fears in the Water"	Fears in the Water
2008	"Don't Make Me So Mad"	El Monstruo
