= Head in a Box =

Head In a Box

EP by The Vincent Black Shadow
- Released: December 8, 2008
- Recorded: March–August 2008
- Genre: Alternative, Pop rock
- Length: 10:00
- Label: Beef Records
- Producer: Robbie Kirkham

The Vincent Black Shadow chronology
El Monstruo (2008)	Head In a Box (2008)	TBA

Head In a Box is the first EP by The Vincent Black Shadow, released on December 8, 2008, by Beef Records.

== Track listing ==
All tracks are written by The Vincent Black Shadow except as otherwise noted.

Standard Edition
No.	Title	Length
1.	"Head In a Box"	3:07
2.	"Other People's Children"	3:22
3.	"White Rabbit (Slick)"	3:01
Total length:		09:30

== Personnel ==
The Vincent Black Shadow

- Cassandra Ford – lead vocals
- Robbie Kirkham – guitars
- Anthony Kirkham – drums, percussion
- Chris Kirkham – bass guitar
