= El Monstruo =

Studio album by The Vincent Black Shadow
- Released: October 27, 2008
- Recorded: March–August 2008
- Genre: Alternative, Pop rock
- Length: 38:29
- Label: Beef Records
- Producer: Robbie Kirkham

The Vincent Black Shadow chronology
Fears in the Water (2006)	El Monstruo (2008)	Head In a Box (2008)

Singles from El Monstruo
- 1. "Don't Make Me So Mad" Released: October 15, 2008

El Monstruo is the second full-length album by The Vincent Black Shadow, released on October 27, 2008, by Beef Records.

== Track listing ==
All tracks are written by The Vincent Black Shadow

Standard Edition
No.	Title	Length
1.	"Stupid Intruders"	3:13
2.	"In a Row"	3:14
3.	"Don't Make Me So Mad"	3:56
4.	"They Still Want You"	3:39
5.	"Pale Man"	3:36
6.	"The Last Few Minutes"	4:16
7.	"The Taste of Copper"	2:55
8.	"Dig Dig Dig"	3:39
9.	"Stereogram"	3:18
10.	"Never Met Another Woman Like Me"	2:13
11.	"El Monstruo"	3:53
12.	"Mooncake"	4:32
Total length:		38:29

== Personnel ==
The Vincent Black Shadow

- Cassandra Ford – Lead vocals
- Robbie Kirkham – Guitars, keyboards, vocals
- Anthony Kirkham – Drums, percussion
- Chris Kirkham – Bass guitar, vocals
