= Bloodlands: Europe Between Hitler and Stalin =

2010 book by Timothy Snyder

- Author: Timothy Snyder
- Language: English
- Subject: Mass murders before and during World War II
- Genre: History
- Publisher: Basic Books
- Publication date: 28 October 2010
- Pages: 544
- ISBN: 978-0-465-00239-9

Bloodlands: Europe Between Hitler and Stalin is a 2010 book by Yale historian Timothy Snyder. It is about mass murders committed before and during World War II in territories controlled by Nazi Germany and the Soviet Union.

In this book, Snyder examines the political, cultural, and ideological context tied to a specific region of Central and Eastern Europe, where Joseph Stalin's Soviet Union and Adolf Hitler's Nazi Germany committed mass murders of an estimated 14 million noncombatants between 1933 and 1945, the majority outside the death camps of the Holocaust. Snyder's thesis delineates the "bloodlands" as a region that now comprises Poland, Belarus, Ukraine, the Baltic states (Estonia, Latvia, and Lithuania), northeastern Romania, and the westernmost fringes of Russia; in this region, Stalin and Hitler's regimes, despite their conflicting goals, interacted to increase suffering and bloodshed beyond what each regime would have inflicted independently.

Snyder draws similarities between the two totalitarian regimes and the enabling interactions that reinforced the destruction and suffering that they inflicted upon noncombatants. According to Anne Applebaum, "Snyder's book has a lot of information that people who know these subjects know very well. But what it does that is different and wholly original is show the ways that Hitler and Stalin echoed one another, at times working together and other times fighting one another. The way in which they egged each other on, acting as two facets of what was really the same phenomenon."

According to Snyder, "the Germans deliberately killed about 11 million noncombatants, a figure that rises to more than 12 million if foreseeable deaths from deportation, hunger, and sentences in concentration camps are included. For the Soviets during the Stalin period, the analogous figures are approximately 6 million and 9 million."

The book was awarded numerous prizes, including the 2013 Hannah Arendt Prize for Political Thought, and stirred up a great deal of debate among historians. Reviews ranged from highly critical to "rapturous".

== Synopsis ==
The Central and Eastern European regions that Snyder terms "the bloodlands" is the area where Hitler's vision of racial supremacy and Lebensraum, resulting in the Final Solution and other Nazi atrocities, met, sometimes in conflict, sometimes in cooperation, with Stalin's vision of a communist ideology that resulted in the deliberate starvation, imprisonment, and murder of innocent men, women and children in Gulags and elsewhere.

The combined efforts of the two regimes resulted in the deaths of an estimated 14 million noncombatants in the Eastern European "Bloodlands"; Snyder documents that Nazi Germany was responsible for about two thirds of the total number of deaths. At least 5.4 million died in what has become known as the Holocaust, but many more died in more obscure circumstances.

Snyder seeks to show that interaction between the Nazi and Soviet regimes is crucial to telling the story of this bloodshed. He posits that early Soviet support for the Warsaw Uprising against the Nazi occupation was followed by an unwillingness to aid the uprising because the Soviets were willing to have the Nazis eliminate potential sources of resistance to a later Soviet occupation. Snyder states that this is one example of an interaction that led to many more deaths than might have been the case if each regime had been acting independently.

According to Jacob Mikanowski, one of the book's overarching goals is to argue that "it's wrong to focus on the camps when so much of the Holocaust was committed out in the open." To this end, Snyder documents that many Jews were killed by mass shootings in villages or the countryside, in addition to those deaths suffered in the death camps. As commented by Anne Applebaum, "[t]he vast majority of Hitler's victims, Jewish and otherwise, never saw a concentration camp." Similarly, all of the Soviet victims discussed were killed outside the Gulag concentration camp system; within those camps, an estimated million people died. More Soviet prisoners of war died every day in Nazi camps during the autumn of 1941 than the total number of Western Allied POWs in the entire war; over three million Soviet POWs died in the Nazi camps. The fate of the German prisoners of war in the Soviet Union was little better, as more than half a million died in the terrible conditions of the Soviet camps.

Snyder focuses on three periods, summarized by Richard Rhodes as "deliberate mass starvation and shootings in the Soviet Union in the period from 1933 to 1938; mass shootings in occupied Poland more or less equally by Soviet and German killers in 1939 to 1941; deliberate starvation of 3.1 million Soviet prisoners of war and mass shooting and gassing of more than 5 million Jews by the Germans between 1941 and 1945." He re-examines numerous points of the war and postwar years such as the Molotov–Ribbentrop Pact of 1939, the rescue of Jews by Poles during the Holocaust, and the Soviet persecution of the Polish Underground State, cursed soldiers, and their own prisoners of war after the war.

The chapter covering the early 1930s famine in Ukraine under the Soviet Union (often termed the Holodomor, a term Snyder avoids) goes into considerable detail. Snyder recounts that in an unofficial orphanage in a village in the Kharkiv region, the children were so hungry they resorted to cannibalism. One child ate parts of himself while he was being cannibalised. 3.3 millions died during the Ukrainian starvation of 1933. Under his Hunger Plan, Hitler starved 4.2 million persons in the Soviet Union, mostly Ukrainians, Belarusians and Russians.

The book highlights the similarities between the two regimes, with Snyder stating: "Hitler and Stalin thus shared a certain politics of tyranny: they brought about catastrophes, blamed the enemy of their choice, and then used the death of millions to make the case that their policies were necessary or desirable. Each of them had a transformative Utopia, a group to be blamed when its realisation proved impossible, and then a policy of mass murder that could be proclaimed as a kind of ersatz victory."

Snyder also describes how the two regimes often collaborated and aided one another before the 1941 German invasion of the Soviet Union, such as the Gestapo–NKVD Conferences. They collaborated extensively in the killings of Poles such as Nazi crimes against ethnic Poles and Soviet repressions of Polish citizens (1939–1946); between the two of them, Nazi Germany and the Soviet Union killed about 200,000 Polish citizens in the period 1939–1941.

About this, Applebaum wrote: "The Nazi and Soviet regimes were sometimes allies, as in the joint occupation of Poland [from 1939–1941]. They sometimes held compatible goals as foes: as when Stalin chose not to aid the rebels in Warsaw in 1944 [during the Warsaw uprising], thereby allowing the Germans to kill people who would later have resisted communist rule ... . Often the Germans and the Soviets goaded each other into escalations that cost more lives than the policies of either state by itself would have." Snyder stated that after the Western Allies had allied themselves with Stalin against Hitler, they did not have the will to fight the second totalitarian regime when the war ended. As American and British soldiers never entered Eastern Europe, the tragedy of those lands did not become well known to the American or British populace and led to the view of Western betrayal.

=== Number of victims ===
Snyder put the total death toll in the "Bloodlands" at 14 million victims of both Stalin and Hitler, including Jewish civilians transported to German camps in occupied Poland during World War II, Polish intelligentsia killed in war crimes such as in the Katyn massacre, disarmed military personnel in occupied countries and prisoners of war. Snyder pointed out that "I am not counting soldiers who died on the fields of battle", saying that this "is not a complete reckoning of all the death that Soviet and German power brought to the region."

Snyder identifies those victims killed as a result of "deliberate policies of mass murder" by governments, such as executions, deliberate famine and death camps. Snyder said that he "generally excludes from the count" deaths due to exertion, disease, or malnutrition in concentration camps; deportations, forced labor, evacuations; people who died of hunger as a result of wartime shortfalls, and civilians killed by bombings or other acts of war. The geographic area covered by the "Bloodlands" is limited to Poland, Ukraine, Belarus, the Baltic states, and western Russian regions occupied by Germany. Regarding the figures, Snyder stated that his reckoning is "on the conservative side."

Snyder provided a summary of the 14 million victims as follows:

- 3.3 million victims of "the Soviet Famines", using the term for the famines in which the victims were "mostly Ukrainians", as he does not use the term "Holodomor"; according to Snyder, Stalin wanted to exterminate by famine those Ukrainians and ethnic Poles who resisted collectivization in the Soviet Union.
- 300,000 victims in the Great Purge in the Soviet Union from 1937–1938, using the term "national terror", which targeted "mostly Poles and Ukrainians", killed because of their ethnic origins (the figure does not include an additional 400,000 Great Purge deaths in areas outside the "Bloodlands"). According to Snyder, Stalin considered ethnic Poles in the western Soviet Union as a potential agents of the Second Polish Republic; Ukrainian kulaks who survived the famine of 1933 were also considered to be potentially hostile to the Soviet regime in a future conflict.
- 200,000 Poles were killed between 1939 and 1941 in occupied Poland, with each regime responsible for about half of those deaths. The deaths included civilians and military prisoners of war killed in the Katyn massacre. Most of the victims were the intellectual and political elite of Poland. According to Snyder, both Stalin and Hitler worked to eliminate the leadership of the Polish nation.
- 4.2 million victims of the German Hunger Plan in the Soviet Union, "largely Russians, Belarusians and Ukrainians"; Snyder does not include famine deaths outside the Soviet Union. According to Snyder, Hitler intended eventually to exterminate up to 45 million Poles, Ukrainians, Belarusians, and Czechs by planned famine as part of Generalplan Ost.
- 5.4 million Jewish victims in the Holocaust (does not include an additional 300,000 deaths outside the Bloodlands).
- 700,000 civilians, "mostly Belarusians and Poles", shot by the Germans "in reprisals" during the occupation of Belarus by Nazi Germany and the Warsaw Uprising of 1944.

In February 2011, the Ottawa Citizen summarized the number of victims, stating that Bloodlands is "a chilling and instructive story of how 14 million unarmed men, women and children were murdered. The death toll includes two familiar victim groups – 5.7 million Jews in the Holocaust and 3.3 million Ukrainians during the 1932–1933 famine engineered by Soviet dictator Josef Stalin – along with lesser-known victims that include three million Soviet prisoners of war who were deliberately starved to death."

In November 2012, historian Dariusz Stola wrote: "His restrictive definition of murderous policies raises doubts. His estimate of fourteen million dead only takes into account people killed within the framework of deliberate policies of mass murder. As a consequence, he is excluding, among others, all those who died as a result of abuse, of diseases or of malnutrition in concentration camps or during the deportations, or even while fleeing from the armies (even when these armies were deliberately pushing people into having to flee)."

== Reception ==
Bloodlands stirred up a great deal of debate among historians, with reviews ranging from highly critical to "rapturous". In assessing these reviews, Jacques Sémelin wrote: "While observers on the whole all join in paying tribute to Snyder's tour de force, they nevertheless don't hold back from subjecting him to several incisive criticisms." Sémelin stated that several historians have criticized the chronological construction of events, the arbitrary geographical delimitation, Snyder's numbers on victims and violence, and a lack of focus on interactions between different actors. Despite these points, Sémelin stated that Bloodlands is one of those books that "change the way we look at a period in history."

The book received favourable reviews in popular press outlets like BBC History, The Seattle Times, and The New York Observer, and has been described as "an impeccably researched history of mass killings in the eastern part of mid-20th-century Europe" by Robert Gerwarth in the Irish Times.

=== Academic reviews ===
The book received praise from an array of experts in the field. Tony Judt called Bloodlands "the most important book to appear on this subject for decades." Other positive reviews include those from Wendy Lower, who wrote that it was a "masterful synthesis", John Connelly, who called it "morally informed scholarship of the highest calibre", and Christopher Browning, who described it as "stunning", while Dennis Showalter stated that "Snyder has written several first-rate books ... And Bloodlands takes his work to a new level."

Mark Roseman wrote that "the book's core achievement is ... to tell the story of Nazi and Soviet violence in a way that renders that savage chapter anew, and enduringly changes what we see." Bloodlands also received harsh criticism from other historians of the period, and specialists on Nazism and Joseph Stalin's Soviet Union.

In a "blistering review" in November 2010 for the London Review of Books, Richard J. Evans wrote that because of a lack of causal argument, "Snyder's book is of no use." Evans wrote that "[i]t seems to me that he is simply equating Nazi genocide with the mass murders carried out in the Soviet Union under Stalin. ... There is nothing wrong with comparing. It's the equation that I find highly troubling." Evans later conceded that Snyder's own critical review of Evans' The Third Reich at War, published the year before in The New York Review of Books, was "one of the many reasons Snyder's book made [him] so cross."

In a summer 2011 article for the Slavic Review, Omer Bartov wrote that while Bloodlands presents an "admirable synthesis", it nonetheless "presents no new evidence and makes no new arguments", and stating that the book is "permeated by a consistent pro-Polish bias", eliding darker aspects of Polish–Jewish relations, and that Snyder's emphasis on German and Soviet occupation policies glosses over interethnic violence, commenting: "By equating partisans and occupiers, Soviet and Nazi occupation, Wehrmacht and Red Army criminality, and evading interethnic violence, Snyder drains the war of much of its moral content and inadvertently adopts the apologists' argument that where everyone is a criminal no one can be blamed."

In a January 2012 review in the Sarmatian Review, Raymond Gawronski described Bloodlands as "a book that must be read and digested, a very significant book that knits together what otherwise are discordant chunks of history, many of which are totally unknown in our culture", adding that "Snyder's sensitivity to the various peoples involved, their own motivations, situations, histories, relations, is remarkable and highly praiseworthy. His reflections on subsequent inflation of numbers by nationalist groups is sober and needed." For Gawronski, "Snyder walks a tightrope of deepening concern for the Jewish Holocaust and a most moving presentation while situating it within the suffering of other surrounding communities: I believe he accomplishes this very difficult task well."

Contemporary European History published a special forum on the book in May 2012, featuring reviews by Jörg Baberowski, Dan Diner, Thomas Kühne, and Mark Mazower as well as an introduction and response by Snyder. Kühne stated that "Snyder is not the first to think about what Hitler and Stalin had in common and how their murderous politics related to each other. The more provocative historians were in doing so and the more they thereby questioned the uniqueness, or the peculiarity, of the Holocaust, the more their work was met with resistance or even disgust, most prominently and controversially the German Ernst Nolte in the 1980s. Snyder's move to link Soviet and Nazi crimes is as politically tricky today as it was then." Kühne added:

[A]s it seems to reduce the responsibility of the Nazis and their collaborators, supporters and claqueurs, it is welcomed in rightist circles of various types: German conservatives in the 1980s, who wanted to 'normalise' the German past, and East European ultranationalists today, who downplay Nazi crimes and up-play Communist crimes in order to promote a common European memory that merges Nazism and Stalinism into a 'double-genocide' theory that prioritises East European suffering over Jewish suffering, obfuscates the distinction between perpetrators and victims, and provides relief from the bitter legacy of East Europeans' collaboration in the Nazi genocide.

In the same special issue, Mazower rejected the idea of reducing Snyder's argument to that of Nolte, stating:

Nolte courted controversy by claiming (and failing to prove) that Nazi crimes emerged as echos of Bolshevik ones and for many years this exercise in historical apologetics gave the interlinked history of Nazism and Stalinism a bad name. ... But among historians at least in the Anglo-American academy, times have changed and, as Bloodlands shows, the question of comparison can now be dealt with in a professional and less tendentious manner. ... The rise of social and cultural history turned Germanists and Soviet historians into introverts, capable of analysing the internal dynamics of their chosen objects of study but loath to place them in their international setting. Snyder's approach is thus fresh and needed and draws on the recent turn to geopolitics in both fields.

Baberowski, a leading contemporary proponent of Nolte's views on the Holocaust, criticized Snyder for not going far enough to connect the genocide of European Jews to "the excesses of Stalin's dictatorship." Diner expressed regret that Snyder did not discuss the legacy of Polish–Russian hostility and of the Polish–Soviet War, which would have given context for Soviet crimes in Katyn and Stalin's decision not to intervene during the Warsaw Uprising against the German occupier in 1944.

In the New Directions in the History of the Jews in the Polish Lands (2018), Dan Michman wrote:

[F]rom the perspective of today, one can say that the pendulum has even moved so far in emphasizing Eastern Europe from June 1941 onward, and first and foremost its killing sites as the locus of the Shoah, that one will find recent studies which entirely marginalize or even disregard the importance to the Holocaust of such essential issues as the 1930s in Germany and Austria; the persecution and murder of Western and Southern European Jewry; first steps of persecution in Tunisia and Libya; and other aspects of the Holocaust such as the enormous spoliation and the cultural warfare aimed at exorcising the jüdische Geist. Perhaps the bluntest example for this development is Timothy Snyder's book Bloodlands, which has been hailed on the one hand for its innovative perspective, but also extremely criticized by world-renowned experts on both Nazism and Stalin's Soviet Union.

Earlier in 2012, Michman had written that "Bloodlands has not convinced me that there was a territory of 'bloodlands' which provides a historical explanation for murder, least of all for the Holocaust."

=== Popular press reviews ===
In a September–October 2010 public debate in The Guardian, Efraim Zuroff criticized what he described as the book's suggestion of a moral equivalence between Soviet mass murders and the Nazi Holocaust, and accused Snyder of providing a scholarly basis for the double genocide theory by emphasizing the Molotov–Ribbentrop Pact.

Dovid Katz commented that Snyder, while a "truly great historian", had stumbled into "a meticulously laid trap" set up by Baltic nationalists –– appearing to provide fodder for their excuse-making surrounding local participation in the Holocaust –– but that he had also included "almost as if by a higher inspired intuition, the key to unlock the very trap he may on a rare occasion be failing to avoid." Snyder responded that "I coincide with Zuroff and Katz on the centrality of the Holocaust, but we must not overlook how Stalin enabled Hitler's crimes."

Writing for The Guardian in October 2010, Neal Ascherson said:

In this book, he seems to have set himself three labours. The first was to bring together the enormous mass of fresh research – some of it his own – into Soviet and Nazi killing, and produce something like a final and definitive account. (Since the fall of communism, archives have continued to open and witnesses – Polish, Ukrainian, Belarusian especially – have continued to break silence.) But Snyder's second job was to limit his own scope, by subject and by place. He is not writing about the fate of soldiers or bombing victims in the second world war, and neither is he confining himself to the Jewish Holocaust. His subject is the deliberate mass murder of civilians – Jewish and non-Jewish – in a particular zone of Europe in a particular time-frame.

Writing in the Financial Times in November 2010, Guy Walters stated that he found the book disturbing, commenting: "Some may find Snyder's staking-out of the area of the bloodlands too arbitrary for their tastes, and might accuse him of creating a questionable geographical delineation. Agree with it or not, in a sense it does not matter, because Snyder presents material that is undeniably fresh – what's more, it comes from sources in languages with which very few western academics are familiar. The success of Bloodlands really lies in its effective presentation of cold, hard scholarship, which is in abundance."

Writing for The New York Review of Books in November 2010, Anne Applebaum commented:

Snyder's original contribution is to treat all of these episodes—the Ukrainian famine, the Holocaust, Stalin's mass executions, the planned starvation of Soviet POWs, postwar ethnic cleansing—as different facets of the same phenomenon. Instead of studying Nazi atrocities or Soviet atrocities separately, as many others have done, he looks at them together. Yet Snyder does not exactly compare the two systems either. His intention, rather, is to show that the two systems committed the same kinds of crimes at the same times and in the same places, that they aided and abetted one another, and above all that their interaction with one another led to more mass killing than either might have carried out alone.

Writing for Jacobin in September 2014, Daniel Lazare described Snyder's Bloodlands as simplistic shoehorning of mass death in Eastern Europe into the crimes of Hitler and Stalin plus side-effects, and stated that the interactive one-upmanship of Nazi–Soviet crimes proposed by Snyder has the whiff of Ernst Nolte. Lazare also called attention to Snyder's suggestion that it was the Home Army's fear of communism that made it hesitant to help the Jewish Combat Organization, which also included communists, in the Warsaw Ghetto.

=== Awards ===
Bloodlands won a number of awards, including the Cundill Prize Recognition of Excellence, Le Prix du livre d'Histoire de l'Europe 2013, Moczarski Prize in History, Literature Award, American Academy of Arts and Letters, Leipzig Book Prize for European Understanding, Phi Beta Kappa Society Emerson Book Award, Gustav Ranis International History Prize, Prakhina Foundation International Book Prize (honorable mention), Jean-Charles Velge Prize, Tadeusz Walendowski Book Prize, and Wacław Jędrzejewicz History Medal. It was also shortlisted for the Duff Cooper Prize, the Wayne S. Vucinich Prize, the Austrian Scholarly Book of the Year, the NDR Kultur Sachbuchpreis 2011, and the Jury commendation Bristol Festival of Ideas. The book was also awarded the 2013 Hannah Arendt Prize for Political Thought.

Bloodlands was named a book of the year for 2010 by The Atlantic, The Daily Telegraph, The Economist, the Financial Times, The Independent, The Jewish Daily Forward, The New Republic, New Statesman, Reason, and The Seattle Times.

== See also ==
- Between Hitler and Stalin
- Bibliography of The Holocaust
- Bibliography of Stalinism and the Soviet Union
- Comparison of Nazism and Stalinism
- Double genocide theory
- List of books by or about Adolf Hitler
  - The German War
  - The Storm of War
  - The Third Reich Trilogy
  - The Rise and Fall of the Third Reich
- Mass killings under communist regimes
- Nazi crime
- Red Famine: Stalin's War on Ukraine
- Stalin: Waiting for Hitler, 1929–1941
- World War II casualties
  - World War II casualties of Poland
  - World War II casualties of the Soviet Union
