= Fears in the Water =

Fears In the Water

Studio album by The Vincent Black Shadow
- Released: July 11, 2006
- Recorded: January–June 2006
- Genre: Alternative, Pop rock
- Length: 50:56
- Label: Bodog; Beef
- Producer: Jason Darr

The Vincent Black Shadow chronology
| Fears In the Water (2006) | El Monstruo (2008) |

Singles from Fears In the Water
- 1. "Metro" Released: June 28, 2006; 2. "Control" Released: January 7, 2007; 3. "Fears in the Water" Released: June 11, 2007

Fears In the Water is the debut album by The Vincent Black Shadow, released on July 11, 2006, by Bodog.

== Track listing ==
All tracks are written by The Vincent Black Shadow

Standard Edition
| No. | Title | Length |
|---|---|---|
| 1. | "Metro" | 4:26 |
| 2. | "Control" | 3:16 |
| 3. | "Bullet on the Tracks" | 3:08 |
| 4. | "Don't Go Soft" | 4:59 |
| 5. | "Valentine" | 3:26 |
| 6. | "Broken" | 3:48 |
| 7. | "The House of Tasteful Men" | 3:34 |
| 8. | "Surgery" | 3:13 |
| 9. | "Ghost Train Out" | 3:37 |
| 10. | "Fears in the Water" | 3:59 |
| 11. | "Dream" | 4:23 |
| 12. | "This Road Is Going Nowhere" | 3:18 |
| 13. | "Letters to No One" | 3:19 |
| Total length: | | 50:56 |

== Personnel ==
Fears in the Water album personnel as listed on Allmusic.

The Vincent Black Shadow

- Cassandra Ford -Vocals
- Chris Kirkham - bass,
- Robbie Kirkham - guitar
- Tony Kirkham - drums

Additional musicians

- Mary Ancheta - keyboards
- John Webster - keyboards, mixing, string arrangements
- Bruce Hamilton - pedal steel

Artwork and design

- Cassandra Ford - art direction
- Albert Normandin - photography

Production and recording

- Jason Darr - engineer, production
- Jay Evjen - assistant engineering
- Doug Fury - engineer
- Robbie Kirkham - Producer
- Eddy Schreyer - mastering
