= Jeff Frumess =

American regional filmmaker, writer, and podcaster

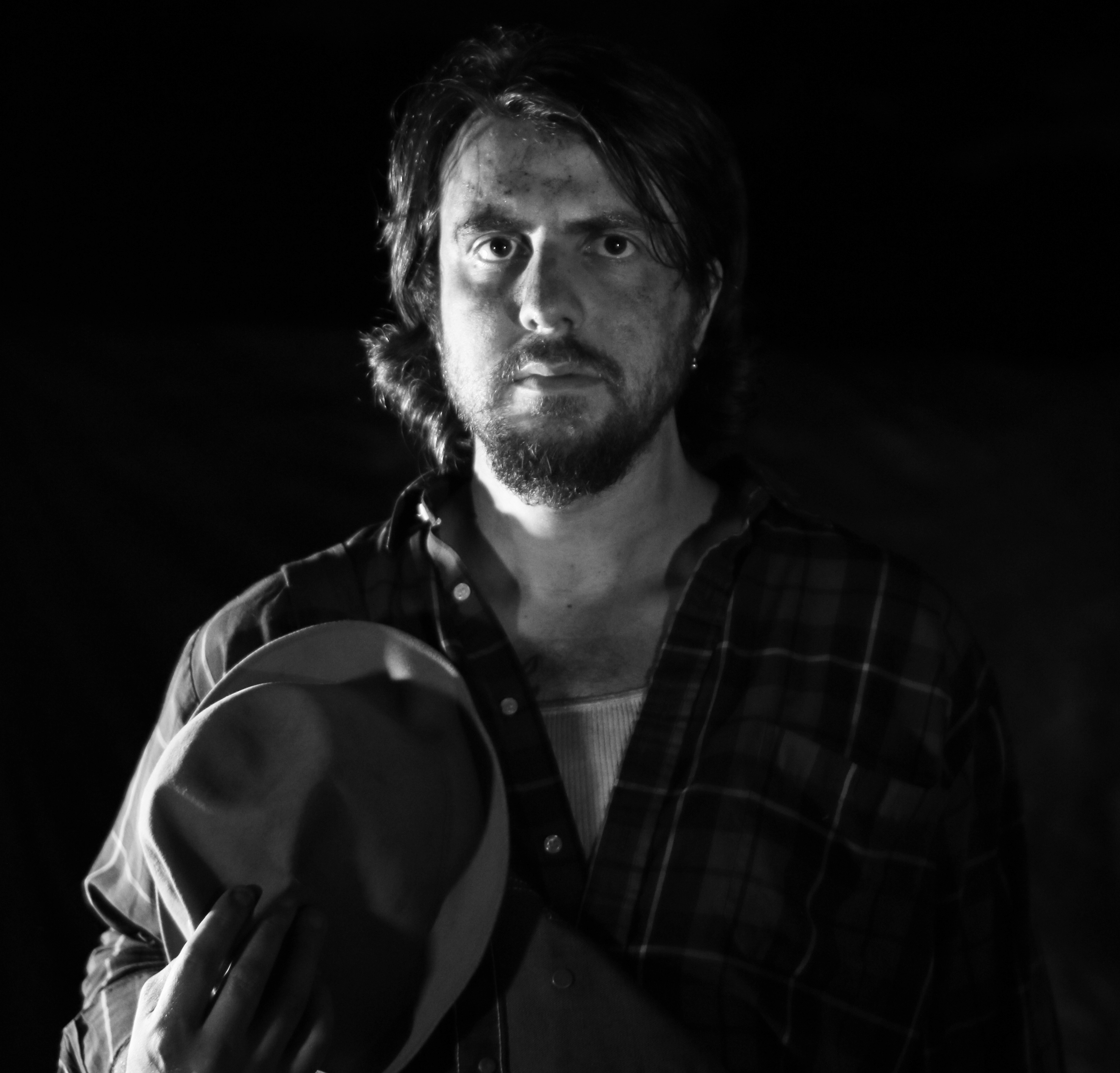
- Occupations: Filmmaker; writer; podcaster; artist
- Years active: 2010–present

YouTube information
- Channel: Frumess
- Years active: 2011–present
- Genres: Entertainment; reaction
- Website: www.frumess.com

Jeff Frumess is an American regional filmmaker, writer, and podcaster from Westchester, NY.

== Career ==
Frumess began filmmaking after watching The Snowball Effect — a documentary about the production of Kevin Smith's first feature film, Clerks. Beginning with short films, then live music production and documentary work, Frumess made a shift into narrative feature films beginning with Romeo's Distress. A second feature, Gouge Away, followed.

Returning home to New York, Frumess began working on a documentary project, They Came from Lodi, recording the history of the punk band The Misfits told by those who surrounded the band, as well as those who were influenced by the original 1977-1983 lineup. Since 2021, the project is incomplete.

From 2011 to 2017, Frumess and Sal Bee from Sardonica ran YouTube series called Rock and Roll Cooking with Sal Bee. Various bands would come to Sal's house in Lodi, New Jersey, where he would cook a band-themed inspired meal followed by a song performance or two in the kitchen studio. Bands who appeared on the show included Doyle, Blitzkid, Nim Vind, The Jasons, The Independents, Stellar Corpses, Cancerslug, Whiplash, Cinema Cinema, Sardonica, Michale Graves, and Dr. Chud's X-Ward.

In late 2011, Frumess produced an unreleased DVD of a live performance for The Dumonts, an acoustic/electric band led by Ex-Misfits 95 frontman Michale Graves, from a show at Club Europa in Brooklyn on December 16, 2011.

In 2012, Frumess accompanied Blitzkid on their farewell U.S. and European tours as a videographer for a documentary that was never completed. In 2014, Frumess again recorded a Blitzkid concert at Conne Island in Leipzig, Germany using four cameras with audio coming directly from the soundboard. The resulting concert film was released to supporters of the Blitzkid documentary's Kickstarter campaign. Some of the 2012 footage shot at the Horror Punk festival Ghouls Night Out at Dingbatz in Clifton, NJ was developed into an unreleased feature length concert film in 2018, titled Long Live the Horror.

=== Romeo's Distress (2017) ===
Inspired by Jeremy Gardner's The Battery, Frumess set out to make his directorial debut with a no-budget narrative feature in August 2014. Romeo's Distress is a gothic, neo-noir horror film that takes its name from the Christian Death song of the same name. The film follows a creepy man named James, his unrequited love for a beautiful girl named Jane, and her father's sadistic response to it all.

The film had its world premiere at the Macabre Faire Film Festival in January 2017, where it was nominated for Best Feature Film, Best Feature Film Director, and winning Best Feature Film Screenplay. Romeo's Distress was also nominated for Best Feature Film Screenplay at Nightmares Film Festival and winner of the Esprit De Gore independent Spirit Award. The film received reviews from Kieran Fisher of Dread Central and Kevan Farrow of Scream magazine, with Fisher praising the acting and stating that it was a "prime example of just how brilliant the horror which creeps beneath the surface can be."

=== Subsequent projects ===
In late 2020, Frumess directed a segment for The Transformations of the Transformations of the Drs. Jenkins, an art film about the pandemic shot by multiple filmmakers separately.

On April 21, 2021, Frumess began work on what would become his second narrative feature-length film, Gouge Away. The film is a sequel to a previously incomplete film called Wash Away (2020). Gouge Away had its world premiere at midnight, Saturday, September 3, 2022, at the GenreBlast Film Festival at the Alamo Drafthouse in Winchester, VA, and winner of the GenreBlast Forever Independent Spirit Award. Kuyashii Gonzo: Blood Visions and Chaos Magic is an incomplete revenge thriller that began as a behind-the-scenes documentary featurette for the Blu-ray release of Gouge Away. The revenge thriller was originally about a therapist named Stanley who seeks revenge.

Frumess began work on My Shadow, a screenplay based on a previous project Dead Dog Robert about a man whose best friend has been resurrected and begins eating people. The story is named after the song "My Shadow" by Jay Reatard. In March 2020, while in quarantine at the beginning of the COVID-19 pandemic, Frumess began to livestream filibuster about music, film, and history. Soon, live interviews began with musicians and filmmakers. The streams initially started on Facebook before moving to YouTube.

== Selected filmography ==
| Year | Title | | | | | | |
| Year | Title | Director | Writer | Producer | Actor | Cinematographer | Notes |
|---|---|---|---|---|---|---|---|
| 2017 | Romeo's Distress | Yes | Yes | Yes | Yes | Yes | |
| 2018 | Long Live the Horror | Yes | Yes | Yes | No | Yes | |
| 2021 | The Transformations of the Transformations of the Drs. Jenkins | Yes | Yes | Yes | Yes | Yes | Segment director |
| 2022 | Gouge Away | Yes | Yes | Yes | Yes | Yes | |
| 2024 | Kuyashii Gonzo: Blood Visions and Chaos Magic | Yes | Yes | Yes | Yes | Yes | |
| 2025 | My Shadow | Yes | Yes | Yes | —N/a | —N/a | |
| 2025 | They Came From Lodi | Yes | Yes | Yes | Yes | Yes | |
