= Dan Michman =

Israeli historian (born 1947)

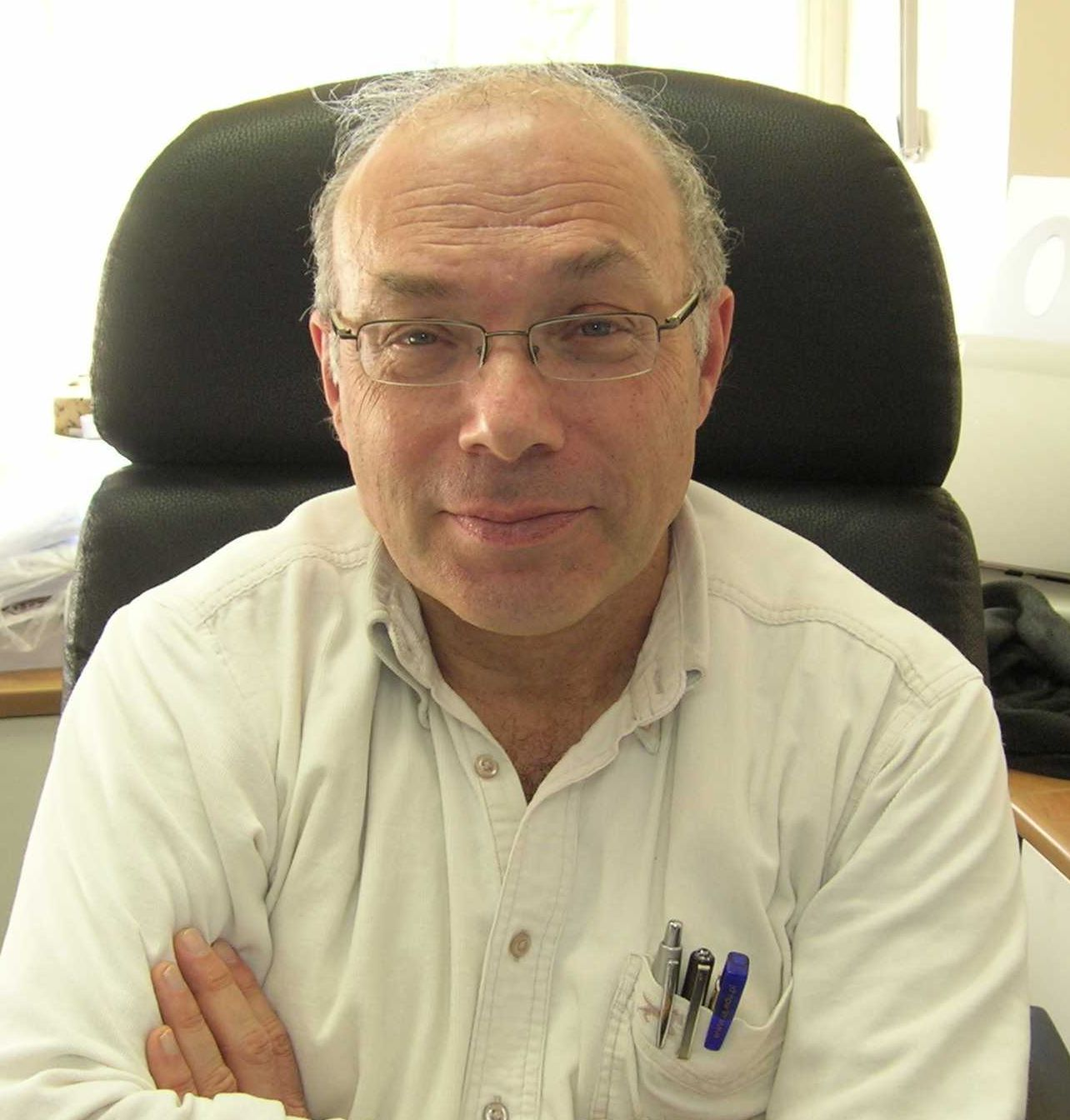
- Portrait of Michman, 2007
- Born: June 28, 1947 (age 79); Amsterdam, North Holland, Kingdom of the Netherlands
- Occupation: Historian
- Spouse: Bruria (née Goldschmidt)
- Children: 6

Academic background
- Education: Hebrew University Secondary School
- Alma mater: Hebrew University of Jerusalem
- Thesis: הפליטים היהודים מגרמניה בהולנד בשנים 1940-1933 (1978)

Academic work
- Discipline: History
- Sub-discipline: Holocaust studies
- Website: Dan Michman publications on Academia.edu

Dan Michman (Hebrew: דן מכמן; born 28 June 1947) is a Dutch Jewish historian. He is the head of the International Institute for Holocaust Research at Yad Vashem in Jerusalem and incumbent of the John Najmann Chair of Holocaust studies.

== Biography ==
Michman was born in Amsterdam in 1947 as a child of Holocaust survivors, who emigrated to Israel in 1957. His father, Dr. Jozeph Michman (Jozeph Melkman) became head of the commemoration centre Yad Vashem, founded four years earlier. After completing compulsory military service, Michman studied Hebrew and Jewish history at the Hebrew University of Jerusalem. He received his Ph.D. in history from this university in 1978 with a dissertation on German Jewish refugees in the Netherlands, 1933-1940. Archival research for this dissertation was done in the Netherlands in the years 1972-1976. After this, he taught Modern Jewish history and Holocaust history at Bar-Ilan University in Ramat Gan, at first as a lecturer, later as a full professor. Since 1983, he has also headed the Arnold and Leona Finkler Institute for Holocaust Research at Bar-Ilan University. In addition, he developed a comprehensive course on Holocaust history for the Open University of Israel. In 2000 he was appointed Chief Historian at the International Institute for Holocaust Research of Yad Vashem, and in 2011 he became the Head of this institute. In these positions, he co-organized various international scholarly conferences and edited and co-authored volumes with conference papers and proceedings. His research focuses on Holocaust historiography, the Nazi ghettoization policy, imposed Jewish governing bodies under Nazi rule (Judenrat), Jewish religious life during the Holocaust, and Dutch and Belgian Jewry during the Holocaust. In his research and publications he stresses the non-violent ways that Jews took to resist genocide. In 2015 he retired as professor of Modern Jewish History at Bar-Ilan University, but he remains actively involved in his function as Head of the International Institute for Holocaust Research at Yad Vashem.

=== Personal life ===
With his wife Bruria, he has six children, 30 grandchildren, and six great-grandchildren.

== Bibliography ==
- The Jewish Refugees from Germany in the Netherlands 1933–1940. Ph.D. dissertation, The Hebrew University, Jerusalem, 1978; 2 volumes. Hebrew text, extensive English summary in vol. 1, pp. iv–xxxiii.
- „The Committee for Jewish Refugees in Holland (1933–1940)", in: Yad Vashem Studies, vol. 14 (1981), pp. 205–232.
- Jozeph Michman, Hartog Beem, Dan Michman, with the assistance of Victor Brilleman and Joop Sanders: Pinkas. Geschiedenis van de joodse gemeenschap in Nederland (Pinkas. History of the Jewish community in the Netherlands). Amsterdam: Contact, revised and updated second edition 1999; 672 pages. ISBN 90-254-9513-3 (First edition Amsterdam/Ede: Nederlands-Israëlitisch Kerkgenootschap/Joods Historisch Museum/Kluwer 1992, translated from the Hebrew by Ruben Verhasselt. Original Hebrew edition: Pinkas Hakehilloth: Holland, Jerusalem: Yad Vashem, 1985).
- Het Liberale Jodendom in Nederland 1929–1943 (Liberal [i.e. Reform] Jewry in the Netherlands, 1929–1943), Amsterdam: Van Gennep, 1988; 224 p. ISBN 90-6012-726-9.
- (Editor, Introduction and co-author) Belgium and the Holocaust: Jews, Belgians, Germans. Jerusalem: Yad Vashem, 1998; 593 p. (Second edition 2000). ISBN 965-308-068-7.
- (Editor) Remembering the Holocaust in Germany, 1945–2000. German strategies and Jewish responses. New York: Peter Lang, 2002; 172 p. ISBN 9780820458045.
- Michman, Dan (2003). Holocaust Historiography: A Jewish Perspective: Conceptualizations, Terminology, Approaches, and Fundamental Issues (hardcover ed.). Vallentine Mitchell. ISBN 9780853034360 – via Google Books..
- (Editor, with introductory article) Encyclopedia of the Righteous Among the Nations: Belgium. Jerusalem: Yad Vashem, 2005; 296 p. ISBN 9780853034360.
- Bankier, David; Michman, Dan (2008). Holocaust Historiography in Context: Emergence, Challenges, Polemics and Achievements (illustrated ed.). Berghahn Books. ISBN 9789653083264 – via Google Books..
- David Bankier, Dan Michman (eds.): Holocaust and justice: representation and historiography of the Holocaust in post-war trials. Jerusalem: Yad Vashem / New York: Berghahn Books, 2010; 343 p. ISBN 978-965-308-353-0.
- Michman, Dan (2011). The Emergence of Jewish Ghettos during the Holocaust. Cambridge University Press. ISBN 9781139494700 – via Google Books..
- Michman, Dan (January 2012). "Bloodlands and the Holocaust: Some Reflections on Terminology, Conceptualization and their Consequences". Journal of Modern European History/Zeitschrift für moderne europäische Geschichte/Revue d'histoire européenne contemporaine. 10 (4). SAGE Publications: 440–445. ISSN 1611-8944. JSTOR 26266041 – via ResearchGate..
- David Bankier, Dan Michman, Iael Nidam-Orvieto (eds.): Pius XII and the Holocaust: Current State of Research. Jerusalem: Yad Vashem, 2012; 277 p. ISBN 978-965-308-421-6.
- "The Jewish Dimension of the Holocaust in Dire Straits? Current Challenges of Interpretation and Scope", in: Norman Goda (ed.), Jewish Histories of the Holocaust. New Transnational Approaches (New York: Berghahn, 2014), pp. 17–38.
- (Editor and Introduction) Hiding, Sheltering and Borrowing Identities. Avenues of Rescue During the Holocaust. Jerusalem: Yad Vashem, 2017; 408 p. ISBN 9789653085619.
- Dina Porat and Dan Michman (eds.), in co-operation with Haim Saadoun: The End of 1942: A Turning Point in World War II and in the Comprehension of the Final Solution? Yad Vashem, Jerusalem, 2017, 384 p. ISBN 9789653085626.
- (Co-editor with Yosef Kaplan) Religious Cultures of Dutch Jewry. Leiden: Brill, 2017; 370 p. ISBN 978-90-04-34316-0.
- Michman, Dan (2018). Polonsky, Antony; Węgrzynek, Hanna; Żbikowski, Andrzej (eds.). "Historiography on the Holocaust in Poland: An Outsider's View of its Place within Recent General Developments in Holocaust Historiography". New Directions in the History of the Jews in the Polish Lands. Academic Studies Press: 386–401. ISBN 9788394426293. JSTOR j.ctv7xbrh4.38..
- 'Why is the Shoah called "the Shoah" or "the Holocaust"? On the history of the terminology for the Nazi anti-Jewish campaign, in: Journal of Holocaust Research, 35-4 (2021), pp. 233–256.
- 'Anti-semit-ism: When and Why was the Term Coined and Embraced and is it Still Useful'. Keynote lecture at Bar-Ilan University conference on "Global Perspectives on Antisemitism", June 12, 2023. Based on his Hebrew article "Can the Term 'Antisemitism' be Used as a Characterizing or Analytical Category in Scholarly Discourse? A Reply to David Engel," Zion 85 (2020), pp. 391–408 (Hebrew).
- Michman, Dan (ed.), Egodocuments in Dutch Jewish History. Emotions, Imaginations, Perceptions, Egos, Characteristics. Amsterdam: Stichting Amphora Books, 2021; 256 p.
