= The German War =

Book by Nicholas Stargardt

The German War: A Nation Under Arms, 1939–1945
- First edition hardcover image
- Author: Nicholas Stargardt
- Language: English
- Subject: Nazi Germany
- Publisher: Bodley Head
- Publication date: 2015
- Publication place: United Kingdom
- Pages: 736
- ISBN: 9780465018994

The German War: A Nation Under Arms, 1939-1945 is a non-fiction book written by historian Nicholas Stargardt. Centering upon the "thoughts and actions" of the citizens living inside Nazi Germany during the Second World War, the author argues that the war crimes committed by Adolf Hitler's totalitarian state had widespread awareness among regular people. Despite massive hardship, those citizens continued to fight in support of fascist ideology even when their cause appeared truly lost. Much of the moral callousness arose due to the fallout from the First World War, which impacted regular Germans' lives deeply, yet the far-right dictatorship had fundamentally managed a successful propaganda machine that brought mass public opinion onto the side of the regime.

Praise for the book has come from multiple publications. Examples include The Guardian, where the "beautifully written" book was lauded as a "sensitive and subtle portrayal of war", and The Independent, where the author was found to have made a "terrifically good" summary of "disturbing" German thoughts. The German War has additionally attracted support from organizations such as the Jewish Book Council.

== Background and contents ==
In broad terms, the author seeks to portray the wide swaths of German public opinion by including both multiple accounts of ordinary people with that of various community leaders. Examples of the latter include bishops of the Roman Catholic Church. Although the attitudes of individual citizens often feature a diversity of contradictory opinions, Stargardt finds a widespread lack of intellectual curiosity and a sort of emotional callousness that characterizes those living under Nazi Party rule, with atrocities getting seen as normal and routine.

Stargardt presents evidence that regular Germans learned of the genocide undertaken as the result of German policy through word of mouth. Massive resistance to the Nazis didn't take place in Germany, and as the war went on, the author documents, German media increasingly "hinted at what people already knew, fostering a sense of collusive semi-secrecy." This 'spiral of silence', according to Stargardt, produced a sense of quasi-complicity among Germans even among those who did not directly participate in atrocities given the widespread knowledge of particular events. The author additionally writes that the Germans began the conflict in the conviction that they were fighting "a war of national defense forced upon them" due to the actions of the Allied powers, particularly what was seen as the Polish Republic's "aggression".

As well, the Allied powers' widespread bombing of Germany convinced the people under the Nazi regime of their own victimhood, an emotion that the author states got mixed with guilt over the mistreatment of Jews, Ukrainians, Poles and others under the Axis powers. As the conflict dragged on, Stargardt writes that the determination with which Germans fought long after it became clear that the Third Reich had essentially lost was based in conviction that the conflagration "must never come home to Germany" given what had been dished out to other nations. Stargardt goes on to explore the remarkable resilience of defeated Germans who, despite living under military occupation, organized themselves to receive and assist the millions of ethnic Germans expelled from countries to Germany's east and south during the end of the War.

In conclusion, the author remarks that the German experience in the First World War frequently blinded individuals to the circumstances of the later conflict. Perceiving themselves as victims, ordinary individuals bought the propaganda of the Nazi Party and fought on despite impossible odds. The Holocaust and all of the related tragedies, simply put, were known by regular Germans; government policy became either openly or tacitly accepted.

== Reception and commercial response ==
The Independent ran a supportive review that labeled Stargardt's conclusions as well-documented although "disturbing". Though facing "an immense task", as historian Marcus Tanner put the challenge, the author "made a terrifically good stab at it" and effectively managed to display Germans' "evolving opinions" in order to "steer and bind the narrative." The Jewish Book Council additionally has cited The German War as a recommended work analyzing Nazi atrocities. Historian Jack Fischel stated that Stargardt made "an important contribution" to studies of the Second World War, with the book describing how the typical German went through a process in which "duty to the nation trumped their conscience".

The Guardian also praised the book. Journalist John Kampfner remarked for the publication that Stargardt's "penetrating study of ordinary German's lives" had documented a morally repugnant "ghastliness" yet had done so in a "beautifully written" fashion. Kampfner also stated that in the "sensitive and subtle portrayal of war", fundamentally "[t]he author deftly weaves individual tales with surprising observation".

The leading Swiss military historian Christian Koller wrote in a review for the Militaegeschichtliche Zeitschrift that "Stargardt's study is not particularly innovative methodologically and the results are not entirely new" and criticised "the marked lack of theory and the failure to link the statements found in the sources not only to the history of the events, but also to the structural conditions of the Nazi state. While in the case of the actions of high-ranking clerics, reference is sometimes made to their possible sanctions by the regime, in the case of the numerous quotations from letters, one hardly learns anything about the conditions of their creation and reception, censorship and self-censorship. The methodological considerations of research on soldiers letters and other wartime self-testimonies, which is now also getting on in years, could have been taken up a little more explicitly here." Nevertheless he praised the book as well: "Stargardt has presented an impressive book that reads smoothly and, despite its monumentality, can be strongly recommended to an audience outside the discipline. The findings of the study are always thought-provoking."

== See also ==
- 2015 in literature
- List of books by or about Adolf Hitler
  - Bloodlands
  - The Storm of War
  - The Third Reich Trilogy
  - The Rise and Fall of the Third Reich
- Nazi Germany
  - The Holocaust
  - Nazi crimes against ethnic Poles
  - Nazi crimes against Soviet POWs
