= Romeo's Distress =

- Directed by: Jeff Frumess
- Written by: Jeff Frumess
- Produced by: Jeff Frumess
- Starring: Anthony Malchar; Jeffrey Alan Solomon; Adam Stordy; Charese Scott Cooper; Dave Street; Renee Mandel
- Music by: Nick Bohun
- Release date: January 2017 (Macabre Faire Film Festival)
- Country: United States
- Language: English

Romeo's Distress is a 2017 American independent, gothic, neo-noir, horror film and the directorial debut of Jeff Frumess. It was filmed on location in Westchester, NY. The film had its world premiere at the Macabre Faire Film Festival in January 2017.

The film takes its name from the Christian Death song on the album Only Theatre of Pain, written by Rozz Williams and Rikk Agnew.

== Description ==
Romeo's Distress is about a creepy guy named James, his unrequited love for a beautiful girl named Jane, and her father's sadistic response to it all.

== Cast ==
- Anthony Malchar as James Ferrose
- Jeffrey Alan Solomon as Dale Matthews
- Adam Stordy as Bobby Samson
- Charese Scott Cooper as Samatha Washington
- Dave Street as Uncle Elmo
- Renee Mandel as Grandma
- Stevie Grossett Jr. as Seymour the flower shop proprietor
- Alex Echevarria as Dr. Myles Woodbine
- Dave "The Voice" Stein as Mr. Cundelini
- Kimberely A. Peterson as Jane Matthews
- Richard Vaine as The Grave Digger

== Production ==
Principal photography for Romeo's Distress lasted for 23 days over 15 months on a budget of US$2,553.00, with roughly one to two shooting days occurring every month despite the story taking place over the course of three days.

Writer/Director/Producer Jeff Frumess and Producer/Composer Nick Bohun made up the crew for the majority of production, with Jeff working as the Cinematographer and Nick the Location Sound Recordist. Some days involved Jeff running camera and sound by himself. The film was shot using the in camera Monochrome profile on the Canon 70D DSLR. This choice was made in part because Jeff found it was easier to light for black and white over color being a first time cinematographer.

The Grandma is played by the director Jeff Frumess' Grandma, Renee Mandel. But her body is played by Dave Street (Uncle Elmo) in the film. Grandma's body and face were shot over a year a part.

Dale's (the father) insurance office, the flower shop, and Dr Woodbine's psychiatrist office interiors were all in exactly the same room that was set dressed over and over as needed for the production.

The cemetery is actually made up of four different cemeteries and one fabricated one in the director's parent's backyard. One of the cemeteries is the world-famous "Old Dutch" cemetery in Sleepy Hollow, NY - right next to the location of the covered bridge from "The Legend of Sleepy Hollow". Both Nick and Jeff were kicked out by the groundskeeper during shooting on two separate occasions.

The electrocution scene was inspired and filmed like one of the director's favorite films Phantom of the Paradise - during Beef's death on stage: Each frame was reorganized to create a disjointed/jarring effect.

The entire ending was rewritten on the spot when production lost one actor and need to create a new one. Brand new scenes and inserts were then shot with this new character and inserted throughout the film so that the character didn't feel so random. For that reason almost half the film was rewritten in the assembly edit of the film.

== Festivals and awards ==
Romeo's Distress had its world premiere at the Macabre Faire Film Festival in January 2017 where it was nominated for best picture, best director, best actor, and winner of best screenplay for a feature. It was also selected by the New Jersey Horror Con and Film Festival in spring 2017 as well as the Toxic Horror Festival, where it was nominated for best feature and best character actor. The film finished its festival run by playing the 2017 Nightmares Film Festival where it was nominated for best screenplay and won the fest's spirit award - the "Esprit de Gore".

== Reception ==
Romeo's Distress has received generally positive reviews. Kieran Fisher of Dread Central gave it 4 out of 5 stars and writes, "Romeo's Distress is the personification of a passion project, a smorgasbord of influences ranging from avant-garde cinema, Gothic literature, punk rock and more." Dave J. Wilson of Diabolique Magazine said, "Romeo's Distress is a unique and intriguing oddity. A strange arthouse experimentation seamlessly melded together with an energetic genre-bending pastiche of creativity, the film is an engaging character study that is a darkly comical and ultimately bleak exploration of the dark side of love." T. Love at Horrorfuel, gave Romeo 8 out of 10 stars and called it "The logical result of Edgar Allan Poe writing a contemporary dark romantic comedy". M. Jones of The Slaughtered Bird called it "80's indie kitsch meets Fritz Lang". Kevan Farrow of Scream Magazine UK gave it 4 out of 5 stars and said, "Romeo's Distress mixes more highbrow influences with an idiosyncratic, almost mischievous oddness and, like its troubled protagonist, walks its own path, unswayed by more 'respectable' trends. Atmospherically dense, gleefully oddball and relentlessly unnerving."

== Release ==
Romeo's Distress made its streaming premiere on Amazon Prime in August 2018.

Hand-numbered, limited-edition Blu-rays with extras including the feature length microbudget filmmaking documentary Blood Visions - which details the 15 month no budget crusade to make Romeo's Distress and the struggles of trying to make a micro budget film, will be available as part of Frumess' follow-up film, Wash Away's Seed and Spark Campaign.
