= Bloodlands (film) =

2017 film by Steven Kastrissios

- Film poster
- Directed by: Steven Kastrissios
- Written by: Steven Kastrissios
- Produced by: Dritan Arbana; Steven Kastrissios; Tan Kazazi
- Starring: Gëzim Rudi; Suela Bako; Emiljano Palali; Alesia Xhemalaj; Ilire Vinca Çelaj
- Cinematography: Leander Ljarja
- Music by: Geir Brillian
- Production companies: Screen Australia; Kastle Films
- Release date: 25 February 2017
- Running time: 85 minutes
- Country: Albania
- Language: Albanian

Bloodlands (Albanian: Tokë Gjaku) is a 2017 Australian-Albanian horror film directed and written by Steven Kastrissios. It stars Gëzim Rudi and Suela Bako as members of a family that have a blood feud with a shtriga.

== Plot ==
Skender, a butcher in Albania, is struggling financially and facing bankruptcy. He refuses to allow his wife Shpresa to hold a job, but Shpresa is fearful of the damage that bankruptcy would cause to their reputation. Their daughter lliriana announces that she is moving to Italy with a friend. A being known as the shtriga begins to haunt the family after Skender harasses two people scavenging for pet food outside of his shop.

== Cast ==
- Gëzim Rudi as Skender
- Suela Bako as Shpresa
- Emiljano Palali as Artan
- Alesia Xhemalaj as Iliriana
- Ilire Vinca Çelaj as Drita
- Dritan Arbana as Florian
- Florist Bajgora as Erald
- Andi Begolli as Leo
- Enxhi Cuku as Lorena
- Fioralba Kryemadhi as Vlora
- Edvin Mustafa as Bako
- Rina Narazani as Town Clerk
- Ermal Sadiku as Olek

== Production ==
Steven Kastrissios, an Australian, wrote and directed the film while the entire cast was Albanian. The story was inspired by Albanian blood feuds and stories told by Dritan Arbana, a friend of Kastrissios and a producer for the film. The cinematography was done by Leander Ljarja and Kastrissios composed the music.

Bloodlands was marketed as the first Albanian horror film. Filming in Albania started in October 2014. Kastrissios relied on translators as the cast did not speak English and shot the film in Albanian despite fears that not being in English would hurt its distribution.

== Release ==
Bloodlands premiered at the Glasgow Film Festival on 25 February 2017, and was released in Tirana, on 22 September. It was shown at the Sitges Film Festival, Brussels International Fantastic Film Festival, Bucheon International Fantastic Film Festival, Fantasporto, and Melbourne International Film Festival. It was given a video on demand release on 30 January 2018.

== Works cited ==
=== Magazines ===
- Heller-Nicholas, Alexandra (2018). "Blood Feuds and Blooalands: STEVEN KASTRISSIOS' ALBANIAN HORROR-FANTASY". Metro Magazine. No. 195. Australian Teachers of Media.

=== News ===
- ""Bloodlands", filmi horror shqiptar, me premierë botërore në Skoci". Koha Ditore. 16 January 2017. Archived from the original on 12 April 2025.
- "Filmi horror shqiptar "Bloodlands" shkon në festivalin e Australisë". Gazeta Sot. 4 November 2017. Archived from the original on 12 April 2025.
- "First ever Albanian horror movie makes world premiere". Tirana Times. 2018. Archived from the original on 12 April 2025.
- Davies, Katie (31 January 2018). "Bloodlands: Don't miss Albania's first horror film". New East Digital Archive. Archived from the original on 12 April 2025.
- Fraser, Colin (2023). "Unsung Auteurs: Steven Kastrissios". FilmInk. Archived from the original on 12 April 2025.
- Morton, Elise (5 September 2017). "First ever Albanian horror movie to premiere this month". New East Digital Archive. Archived from the original on 12 April 2025.
- Petković, Vladan (30 January 2018). "EXCLUSIVE: Trailer for first Albanian horror Bloodlands". Cineuropa. Archived from the original on 12 April 2025.

=== Web ===
- "Bloodlands". Cineuropa. Archived from the original on 12 April 2025.
- "Bloodlands". Melbourne International Film Festival. Archived from the original on 12 April 2025.
