= Nicholas Stargardt =

Australian historian (born 1962)

Nicholas Stargardt FRHistS
- Born: Edward Nicholas Raymond Stargardt; 1962 (age 63–64); Melbourne, Australia
- Occupations: Historian and academic
- Title: Professor of Modern European History
- Children: 1
- Awards: PEN Hessell-Tiltman Prize (2016)

Academic background
- Education: Hills Road Sixth Form College
- Alma mater: King's College, Cambridge

Academic work
- Discipline: History
- Sub-discipline: History of Germany; Political history; Military history; Intellectual history
- Institutions: King's College, Cambridge; Royal Holloway, University of London; Magdalen College, Oxford
- Notable works: The German War (2015)

Edward Nicholas Raymond Stargardt FRHistS (born 1962) is an Australian historian. He is Professor of Modern European History at the University of Oxford and a Tutorial Fellow in History at Magdalen College.

Stargardt is the son of a German-Jewish father and Australian mother. He was born in Melbourne, Australia, and lived in Australia, Japan, England and Germany. He was educated at Hills Road Sixth Form College in Cambridge and earned his BA and PhD at King's College, Cambridge, staying on for a research fellowship there. He held a lectureship at Royal Holloway, University of London before moving to Magdalen College in 1999. In 2011 the university awarded him the Title of Distinction of Professor of Modern European History. He is currently vice president of Magdalen College.

He is the author of The German Idea of Militarism: Radical and Socialist Critics (1994), an intellectual and political history of anti-militarist movements in Germany before the First World War, and of Witnesses of War: Children’s Lives under the Nazis (2005), which offered the first social history of Nazi Germany in the Second World War through the eyes of children. His 2015 book, The German War, explores the attitudes of German citizens during the Second World War. The book won the 2016 PEN Hessell-Tiltman Prize.

Stargardt appears as a commentator in the BBC Four series Lost Home Movies of Nazi Germany (also shown on Netflix in 2023).

== Personal life ==
Stargardt has a son with fellow historian Lyndal Roper. His partner is Fernanda Pirie, Professor of the Anthropology of Law at St Cross College, Oxford.

== Bibliography ==
- The German Idea of Militarism: Radical and Socialist Critics 1866–1914, 1994, Cambridge. ISBN 9780521466929
- Witnesses of War: Children's Lives under the Nazis, Jonathan Cape, 2005, ISBN 0-224-06479-7.
- The German War: A Nation Under Arms, 1939–1945, Bodley Head/Basic Books, 2015.
