= Paul Palmentola =

Italian-born American art director (1888–1966)

- Born: February 18, 1888; Kingdom of Italy
- Died: April 19, 1966 (aged 78); Los Angeles, California, United States
- Occupation: Art director
- Years active: 1932-1960 (film)

Paul Palmentola (1888–1966) was an Italian-born American art director. He designed the film sets for more than two hundred productions during his career, much of his work during the 1930s and 1940s at low-budget studios such as Mayfair Pictures, Monogram and PRC. He was later employed by Columbia Pictures in the early 1950s, working on their adventure films and with Sam Katzman's unit.

== Selected filmography ==
- The Honor of the Press (1932)
- The Heart Punch (1932)
- High Gear (1933)
- Her Resale Value (1933)
- Found Alive (1933)
- Revenge at Monte Carlo (1933)
- The Big Bluff (1933)
- Alimony Madness (1933)
- Badge of Honor (1934)
- Hollywood Mystery (1934)
- I Hate Women (1934)
- Shadows of the Orient (1935)
- The Fire-Trap (1935)
- White Legion (1936)
- We Went to College (1936)
- The Devil Is a Sissy (1936)
- Wallaby Jim of the Islands (1937)
- Here's Flash Casey (1938)
- I Take This Oath (1940)
- Tiger Fangs (1943)
- Sweethearts of the U.S.A. (1944)
- Dixie Jamboree (1944)
- Swing Hostess (1944)
- Rogues' Gallery (1944)
- Jungle Woman (1944)
- Men on Her Mind (1944)
- Thundering Gun Slingers (1944)
- The Monster Maker (1944)
- The Contender (1944)
- I Accuse My Parents (1944)
- Shake Hands with Murder (1944)
- Seven Doors to Death (1944)
- Bluebeard (1944)
- Fog Island (1945)
- The Man Who Walked Alone (1945)
- The Phantom of 42nd Street (1945)
- Freddie Steps Out (1946)
- Vacation Days (1947)
- Two Blondes and a Redhead (1947)
- I Surrender Dear (1948)
- The Prince of Thieves (1948)
- Glamour Girl (1948)
- Make Believe Ballroom (1949)
- The Lost Tribe (1949)
- Chinatown at Midnight (1949)
- Barbary Pirate (1949)
- Kazan (1949)
- Captive Girl (1950)
- Revenue Agent (1950)
- Last of the Buccaneers (1950)
- Pygmy Island (1950)
- Tyrant of the Sea (1950)
- A Yank in Korea (1951)
- The Magic Carpet (1951)
- Purple Heart Diary (1951)
- Fury of the Congo (1951)
- When the Redskins Rode (1951)
- Harem Girl (1952)
- The Pathfinder (1952)
- A Yank in Indo-China (1952)
- Thief of Damascus (1952)
- Brave Warrior (1952)
- California Conquest (1952)
- Last Train from Bombay (1952)
- The Golden Hawk (1952)
- The 49th Man (1953)
- Fort Ti (1953)
- Serpent of the Nile (1953)
- Prince of Pirates (1953)
- Prisoners of the Casbah (1953)
- Jack McCall, Desperado (1953)
- Siren of Bagdad (1953)
- Flame of Calcutta (1953)
- Conquest of Cochise (1953)
- Savage Mutiny (1953)
- Charge of the Lancers (1954)
- The Iron Glove (1954)
- Drums of Tahiti (1954)
- Battle of Rogue River (1954)
- The Saracen Blade (1954)
- Masterson of Kansas (1954)
- Pirates of Tripoli (1955)
- New Orleans Uncensored (1955)
- Seminole Uprising (1955)
- Chicago Syndicate (1955)
- Apache Ambush (1955)
- Duel on the Mississippi (1955)
- The Crooked Web (1955)
- Inside Detroit (1956)
- The Houston Story (1956)
- Rock Around the Clock (1956)
- Miami Exposé (1956)
- The Tijuana Story (1957)
- Life Begins at 17 (1958)
- Juke Box Rhythm (1959)
- The Flying Fontaines (1959)

== Bibliography ==
- Michael L. Stephens. Art Directors in Cinema: A Worldwide Biographical Dictionary. McFarland, 1998.
