= List of American films of 1956 =

American films released in 1956

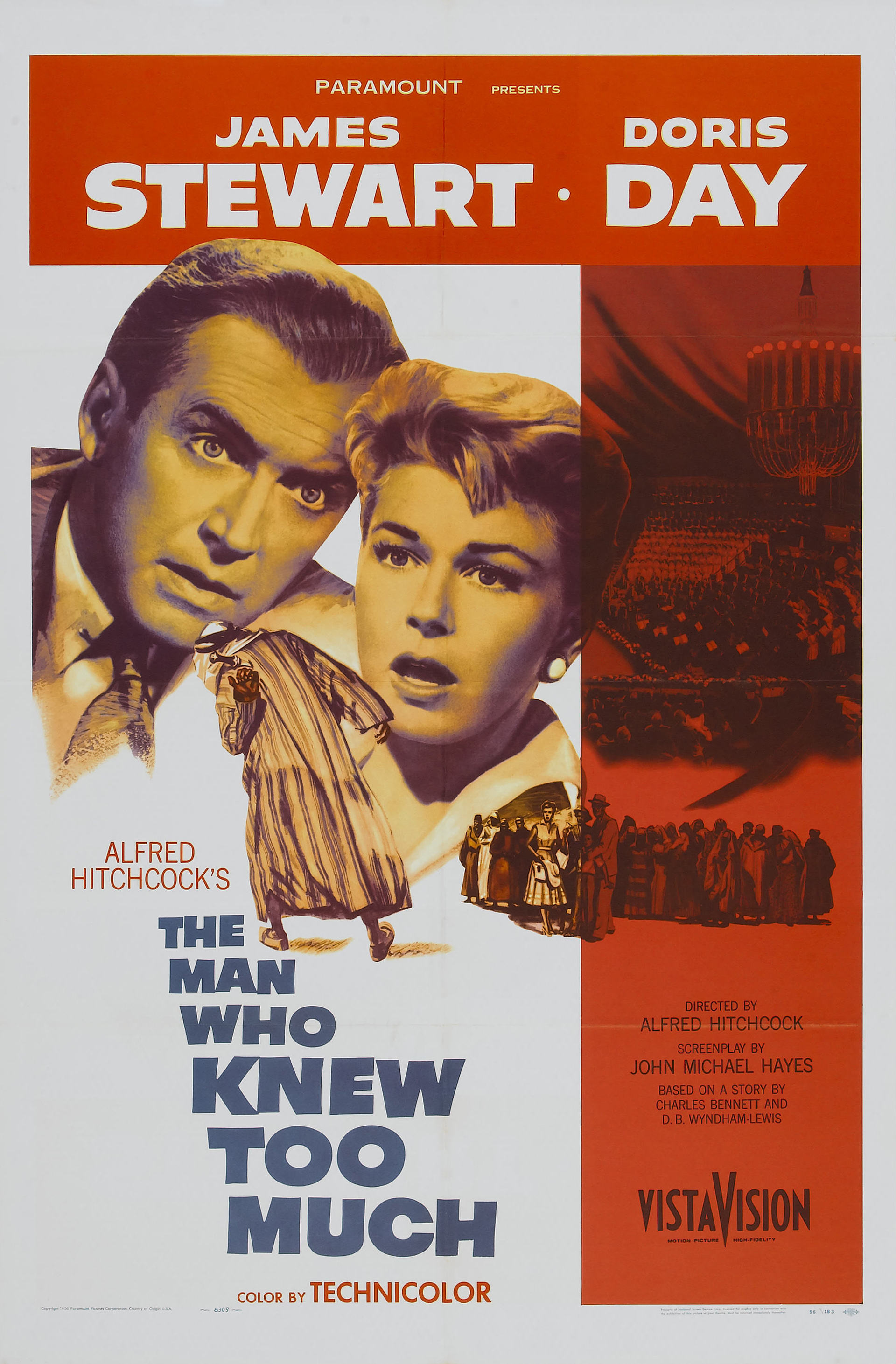
The Man Who Knew Too Much directed by Alfred Hitchcock.

More than 270 American feature films were released in 1956.
Around the World in 80 Days won the Academy Award for Best Picture.

== A-B ==
| Title | Director | Cast | Genre | Notes |
|---|---|---|---|---|
| 7th Cavalry | Joseph H. Lewis | Randolph Scott, Barbara Hale, Jay C. Flippen | Western | Columbia Pictures |
| 23 Paces to Baker Street | Henry Hathaway | Van Johnson, Vera Miles, Cecil Parker | Thriller | 20th Century Fox. From Philip MacDonald novel |
| Accused of Murder | Joseph Kane | David Brian, Vera Ralston, Sidney Blackmer | Film noir | Republic |
| Alexander the Great | Robert Rossen | Richard Burton, Claire Bloom, Fredric March | Drama | United Artists |
| The Ambassador's Daughter | Norman Krasna | Olivia de Havilland, John Forsythe, Adolphe Menjou | Romantic comedy | United Artists |
| Anastasia | Anatole Litvak | Ingrid Bergman, Yul Brynner, Helen Hayes | Drama | 20th Century Fox; Remade in 1997 film |
| Anything Goes | Robert Lewis | Bing Crosby, Donald O'Connor, Mitzi Gaynor | Musical | Paramount. Based on 1934 play, 1936 film |
| Around the World in 80 Days | Michael Anderson, John Farrow | David Niven, Cantinflas, Shirley MacLaine | Adventure | United Artists. Winner of 5 Oscars, Best Picture; based on a novel by Jules Verne |
| Attack | Robert Aldrich | Jack Palance, Eddie Albert, Lee Marvin | War | United Artists |
| Autumn Leaves | Robert Aldrich | Joan Crawford, Cliff Robertson, Vera Miles | Drama | Columbia |
| Away All Boats | Joseph Pevney | Jeff Chandler, George Nader, Julie Adams | War | Universal |
| Baby Doll | Elia Kazan | Carroll Baker, Karl Malden, Eli Wallach | Drama | Warner Bros. Written by Tennessee Williams; 4 Oscar nominations |
| Back from Eternity | John Farrow | Robert Ryan, Anita Ekberg, Rod Steiger | Drama | RKO. Remake of Five Came Back |
| Backlash | John Sturges | Richard Widmark, Donna Reed, William Campbell | Western | Universal; Remake of 1947 film |
| The Bad Seed | Mervyn LeRoy | Nancy Kelly, Patty McCormack, Henry Jones | Thriller | Warner Bros. |
| Bandido | Richard Fleischer | Robert Mitchum, Ursula Thiess, Gilbert Roland | Western | United Artists |
| Battle Stations | Lewis Seiler | John Lund, William Bendix, Richard Boone | War | Columbia |
| The Beast of Hollow Mountain | Edward Nassour | Guy Madison, Patricia Medina, Carlos Rivas | Horror | United Artists |
| Behind the High Wall | Abner Biberman | Tom Tully, Sylvia Sidney, Betty Lynn | Film noir | Universal |
| The Benny Goodman Story | Valentine Davies | Steve Allen, Donna Reed, Herbert Anderson | Musical | Universal Pictures |
| The Best Things in Life Are Free | Michael Curtiz | Gordon MacRae, Dan Dailey, Sheree North | Musical | 20th Century Fox |
| Between Heaven and Hell | Richard Fleischer | Robert Wagner, Buddy Ebsen, Broderick Crawford | War | 20th Century Fox |
| Beyond Mombasa | George Marshall | Cornel Wilde, Donna Reed, Leo Genn | Adventure | United Artists. Co-production with UK. |
| Beyond a Reasonable Doubt | Fritz Lang | Dana Andrews, Joan Fontaine, Sidney Blackmer | Film noir | RKO Pictures; remade in 2009 |
| Bhowani Junction | George Cukor | Ava Gardner, Stewart Granger, Bill Travers | Drama | MGM. Co-production with UK. |
| Bigger Than Life | Nicholas Ray | James Mason, Barbara Rush, Walter Matthau | Drama | 20th Century Fox |
| The Birds and the Bees | Norman Taurog | George Gobel, Mitzi Gaynor, David Niven | Musical | Paramount |
| The Black Sleep | Reginald LeBorg | Basil Rathbone, Akim Tamiroff, Lon Chaney Jr. | Horror | United Artists |
| The Black Whip | Charles Marquis Warren | Hugh Marlowe, Coleen Gray, Adele Mara | Western | 20th Century Fox |
| Blackjack Ketchum, Desperado | Earl Bellamy | Howard Duff, Margaret Field, Angela Stevens | Western | Columbia |
| The Bold and the Brave | Lewis R. Foster | Mickey Rooney, Wendell Corey, Nicole Maurey | War | RKO |
| The Boss | Byron Haskin | John Payne, William Bishop, Gloria McGehee | Film noir | United Artists |
| The Bottom of the Bottle | Henry Hathaway | Joseph Cotten, Van Johnson, Ruth Roman | Drama | 20th Century Fox |
| The Brass Legend | Gerd Oswald | Hugh O'Brian, Nancy Gates, Raymond Burr | Western | United Artists |
| The Brave One | Irving Rapper | Michel Ray, Elsa Cárdenas, Rodolfo Hoyos Jr. | Drama | RKO. Oscar for writer Dalton Trumbo |
| The Broken Star | Lesley Selander | Howard Duff, Lita Baron, Douglas Fowley | Western | United Artists |
| Bundle of Joy | Norman Taurog | Debbie Reynolds, Eddie Fisher, Adolphe Menjou | Comedy | RKO |
| The Burning Hills | Stuart Heisler | Tab Hunter, Natalie Wood, Skip Homeier | Western | Warner Bros. |
| Bus Stop | Joshua Logan | Marilyn Monroe, Don Murray, Betty Field | Drama | 20th Century Fox; based on two plays by William Inge |

== C-D ==
| Title | Director | Cast | Genre | Notes |
|---|---|---|---|---|
| Calling Homicide | Edward Bernds | Bill Elliott, Kathleen Case, Don Haggerty | Crime | Allied Artists |
| Canyon River | Harmon Jones | George Montgomery, Marcia Henderson, Peter Graves | Western | Allied Artists |
| Carousel | Henry King | Shirley Jones, Gordon MacRae, Cameron Mitchell | Musical | 20th Century Fox; based on play |
| The Catered Affair | Richard Brooks | Bette Davis, Debbie Reynolds, Ernest Borgnine | Drama | MGM; from teleplay by Paddy Chayefsky |
| Cha-Cha-Cha Boom! | Fred F. Sears | Stephen Dunne, Helen Grayco, Mary Kaye | Musical | Columbia |
| Comanche | George Sherman | Dana Andrews, Kent Smith, Nestor Paiva | Western | United Artists |
| Come Next Spring | R. G. Springsteen | Ann Sheridan, Steve Cochran, Walter Brennan | Drama | Republic |
| The Come On | Russell Birdwell | Anne Baxter, Sterling Hayden, John Hoyt | Drama | Allied Artists |
| Congo Crossing | Joseph Pevney | Virginia Mayo, George Nader, Peter Lorre | Film noir | Universal |
| The Conqueror | Dick Powell | John Wayne, Susan Hayward, Pedro Armendáriz | Adventure | RKO |
| The Court Jester | Melvin Frank, Norman Panama | Danny Kaye, Basil Rathbone, Angela Lansbury | Comedy | Paramount |
| Crashing Las Vegas | Jean Yarbrough | Leo Gorcey, Huntz Hall, Mary Castle | Comedy | Allied Artists |
| The Creature Walks Among Us | John Sherwood | Jeff Morrow, Rex Reason, Leigh Snowden | Science fiction | Universal |
| Crime Against Joe | Lee Sholem | Julie London, John Bromfield, Patricia Blair | Crime drama | United Artists |
| Crime in the Streets | Don Siegel | James Whitmore, John Cassavetes, Virginia Gregg | Crime drama | Allied Artists |
| Crowded Paradise | Fred Pressburger | Hume Cronyn, Nancy Kelly, Frank Silvera | Drama | Independent |
| A Cry in the Night | Frank Tuttle | Natalie Wood, Edmond O'Brien, Raymond Burr | Thriller | Warner Bros. |
| Curucu, Beast of the Amazon | Curt Siodmak | John Bromfield, Beverly Garland, Tom Payne | Adventure | Universal |
| A Day of Fury | Harmon Jones | Dale Robertson, Mara Corday, Jock Mahoney | Western | Universal |
| D-Day the Sixth of June | Henry Koster | Robert Taylor, Richard Todd, Dana Wynter | War | 20th Century Fox |
| Dakota Incident | Lewis R. Foster | Dale Robertson, Linda Darnell, John Lund | Western | Republic |
| Dance with Me, Henry | Charles Barton | Bud Abbott, Lou Costello, Gigi Perreau | Comedy | United Artists; final Abbott and Costello film |
| Daniel Boone, Trail Blazer | Ismael Rodríguez | Bruce Bennett, Lon Chaney Jr., Jacqueline Evans | Adventure | Republic |
| Death of a Scoundrel | Charles Martin | George Sanders, Yvonne De Carlo, Zsa Zsa Gabor | Drama | RKO |
| The Desperados Are in Town | Kurt Neumann | Robert Arthur, Kathleen Nolan, Rhys Williams | Western | 20th Century Fox |
| Diane | David Miller | Lana Turner, Roger Moore, Pedro Armendáriz | Drama | MGM |
| Dig That Uranium | Edward Bernds | Leo Gorcey, Huntz Hall, Mary Beth Hughes | Comedy | Allied Artists |
| Don't Knock the Rock | Fred F. Sears | Alan Dale, Fay Baker, Patricia Hardy | Musical | Columbia |

== E-I ==
| Title | Director | Cast | Genre | Notes |
|---|---|---|---|---|
| Earth vs. the Flying Saucers | Fred F. Sears | Hugh Marlowe, Joan Taylor, Donald Curtis | Science fiction | Columbia |
| The Eddy Duchin Story | George Sidney | Tyrone Power, Kim Novak, Victoria Shaw | Biography | Columbia |
| Edge of Hell | Hugo Haas | Hugo Haas, Jeffrey Stone, Tracey Roberts | Film noir | Universal |
| Emergency Hospital | Lee Sholem | Walter Reed, Margaret Lindsay, John Archer | Drama | United Artists |
| Everything but the Truth | Jerry Hopper | Maureen O'Hara, John Forsythe, Tim Hovey | Comedy | Universal |
| The Fastest Gun Alive | Russell Rouse | Glenn Ford, Jeanne Crain, Broderick Crawford | Western | MGM |
| Fighting Trouble | George Blair | Huntz Hall, Stanley Clements, Adele Jergens | Comedy | Allied Artists |
| The First Texan | Byron Haskin | Joel McCrea, Felicia Farr, Jeff Morrow | Western | Allied Artists |
| The First Traveling Saleslady | Arthur Lubin | Ginger Rogers, Carol Channing, Barry Nelson | Western comedy | RKO |
| Flame of the Islands | Edward Ludwig | Yvonne De Carlo, Howard Duff, Zachary Scott | Film noir | Republic |
| Flesh and the Spur | Edward L. Cahn | Marla English, Mike Connors, Raymond Hatton | Western | AIP |
| Flight to Hong Kong | Joseph M. Newman | Rory Calhoun, Barbara Rush, Dolores Donlon | Film noir | United Artists |
| Forbidden Planet | Fred M. Wilcox | Leslie Nielsen, Walter Pidgeon, Anne Francis | Science fiction | MGM |
| Foreign Intrigue | Sheldon Reynolds | Robert Mitchum, Geneviève Page, Ingrid Thulin | Thriller | United Artists |
| Forever, Darling | Alexander Hall | Lucille Ball, Desi Arnaz, James Mason | Romantic comedy | MGM |
| Friendly Persuasion | William Wyler | Gary Cooper, Dorothy McGuire, Anthony Perkins | Drama | Allied Artists. Set in American Civil War; 6 Oscar nominations |
| Frontier Gambler | Sam Newfield | John Bromfield, Coleen Gray, Kent Taylor | Western | Independent |
| Frontier Woman | Ron Ormond | Cindy Carson, Lance Fuller, Rance Howard | Western | Independent |
| Full of Life | Richard Quine | Judy Holliday, Richard Conte, Salvatore Baccaloni | Drama | Columbia |
| Fury at Gunsight Pass | Fred F. Sears | David Brian, Neville Brand, Lisa Davis | Western | Columbia |
| Gaby | Curtis Bernhardt | Leslie Caron, John Kerr, Cedric Hardwicke | Drama | MGM |
| Ghost Town | Allen H. Miner | Kent Taylor, John Smith, Marian Carr | Western | United Artists |
| Giant | George Stevens | Rock Hudson, Elizabeth Taylor, James Dean | Drama | Warner Bros. Based on Edna Ferber novel; 10 Oscar nominations |
| The Girl Can't Help It | Frank Tashlin | Jayne Mansfield, Tom Ewell, Edmond O'Brien | Comedy | 20th Century Fox |
| The Girl He Left Behind | David Butler | Natalie Wood, Tab Hunter, Jessie Royce Landis | Romance | Warner Bros. |
| Girls in Prison | Edward L. Cahn | Richard Denning, Joan Taylor, Mae Marsh | Sexploitation | A.I.P. |
| Glory | David Butler | Margaret O'Brien, Walter Brennan, Charlotte Greenwood | Musical | RKO |
| Godzilla, King of the Monsters! | Ishirō Honda | Raymond Burr, Takashi Shimura, Momoko Kōchi | Science fiction | Embassy |
| Good-bye, My Lady | William A. Wellman | Brandon deWilde, Walter Brennan, Phil Harris | Drama | Warner Bros. |
| Great Day in the Morning | Jacques Tourneur | Robert Stack, Virginia Mayo, Ruth Roman | Drama | RKO |
| The Great Locomotive Chase | Francis D. Lyon | Fess Parker, Jeffrey Hunter, John Lupton | Action | Disney |
| The Great American Pastime | Herman Hoffman | Tom Ewell, Ann Miller, Anne Francis | Comedy | MGM |
| The Great Man | José Ferrer | José Ferrer, Julie London, Ed Wynn | Drama | Universal |
| Gun Brothers | Sidney Salkow | Buster Crabbe, Ann Robinson, Neville Brand | Western | United Artists |
| Gun the Man Down | Andrew V. McLaglen | James Arness, Angie Dickinson, Emile Meyer | Western | United Artists |
| Gunslinger | Roger Corman | John Ireland, Beverly Garland, Allison Hayes | Western | AIP |
| The Harder They Fall | Mark Robson | Humphrey Bogart, Rod Steiger, Jan Sterling | Drama | Columbia |
| He Laughed Last | Blake Edwards | Frankie Laine, Anthony Dexter, Lucy Marlow | Comedy | Columbia |
| Helen of Troy | Robert Wise | Rossana Podestà, Jacques Sernas, Cedric Hardwicke | Epic | Warner Bros.. Co-production with Italy and France |
| Hell on Frisco Bay | Frank Tuttle | Alan Ladd, Edward G. Robinson, Joanne Dru | Film noir | Warner Bros. |
| Hidden Guns | Albert C. Gannaway | Bruce Bennett, Richard Arlen, Angie Dickinson | Western | Republic |
| High Society | Charles Walters | Grace Kelly, Bing Crosby, Frank Sinatra | Musical comedy | MGM; remake of The Philadelphia Story |
| Hilda Crane | Philip Dunne | Jean Simmons, Guy Madison, Jean-Pierre Aumont | Drama | 20th Century Fox |
| Hold Back the Night | Allan Dwan | John Payne, Mona Freeman, Peter Graves | War drama | Allied Artists |
| Hollywood or Bust | Frank Tashlin | Dean Martin, Jerry Lewis, Anita Ekberg | Comedy | Paramount; 16th & final Martin and Lewis film |
| Hot Blood | Nicholas Ray | Jane Russell, Cornel Wilde, Joseph Calleia | Drama | Columbia |
| Hot Cars | Don McDougall | John Bromfield, Joi Lansing, Ralph Clanton | Crime | United Artists |
| Hot Rod Girl | Leslie Martinson | Lori Nelson, Chuck Connors, Roxanne Arlen | Action | AIP |
| Hot Shots | Jean Yarbrough | Bowery Boys, Joi Lansing, Queenie Smith | Comedy | Allied Artists |
| The Houston Story | William Castle | Barbara Hale, Gene Barry, Edward Arnold | Crime | Columbia |
| Huk! | John Barnwell | George Montgomery, Mona Freeman, John Baer | Drama | United Artists |
| I Killed Wild Bill Hickok | Richard Talmadge | Johnny Carpenter, Tom Brown, Virginia Gibson | Western | Independent |
| Indestructible Man | Jack Pollexfen | Lon Chaney Jr., Ross Elliott, Marian Carr | Horror | Allied Artists |
| The Indian Fighter | André de Toth | Kirk Douglas, Elsa Martinelli, Walter Matthau | Western | United Artists |
| Inside Detroit | Fred F. Sears | Pat O'Brien, Dennis O'Keefe, Tina Carver | Film noir | Columbia |
| Invasion of the Body Snatchers | Don Siegel | Kevin McCarthy, Dana Wynter, Carolyn Jones | Science fiction | Allied Artists; based on Jack Finney novel; remade in 1978 |
| Invitation to the Dance | Gene Kelly | Gene Kelly, Tamara Toumanova, Belita | Musical | MGM |
| It Conquered the World | Roger Corman | Peter Graves, Beverly Garland, Lee Van Cleef | Science fiction | AIP |
| I've Lived Before | Richard Bartlett | Jock Mahoney, Leigh Snowden, Ann Harding | Drama | Universal |

== J-M ==
| Title | Director | Cast | Genre | Notes |
|---|---|---|---|---|
| Jaguar | George Blair | Sabu, Barton MacLane, Jonathan Hale | Adventure | Republic |
| Johnny Concho | Don McGuire | Frank Sinatra, Keenan Wynn, Phyllis Kirk | Drama | United Artists |
| Jubal | Delmer Daves | Glenn Ford, Ernest Borgnine, Rod Steiger | Western | Columbia |
| Julie | Andrew L. Stone | Doris Day, Louis Jourdan, Frank Lovejoy | Thriller | MGM |
| The Kettles in the Ozarks | Charles Lamont | Marjorie Main, Arthur Hunnicutt, Una Merkel | Comedy | Universal |
| The Killer Is Loose | Budd Boetticher | Joseph Cotten, Rhonda Fleming, Wendell Corey | Film noir | United Artists |
| The Killing | Stanley Kubrick | Sterling Hayden, Coleen Gray, Marie Windsor | Film noir | United Artists |
| The King and Four Queens | Raoul Walsh | Clark Gable, Eleanor Parker, Barbara Nichols | Western | United Artists |
| The King and I | Walter Lang | Yul Brynner, Deborah Kerr, Rita Moreno | Musical | 20th Century Fox. Winner of 5 Academy Awards |
| A Kiss Before Dying | Gerd Oswald | Robert Wagner, Joanne Woodward, Virginia Leith | Thriller | United Artists |
| The Last Hunt | Richard Brooks | Robert Taylor, Stewart Granger, Debra Paget | Western | MGM |
| The Last Wagon | Delmer Daves | Richard Widmark, Felicia Farr, Susan Kohner | Western | 20th Century Fox |
| The Leather Saint | Alvin Ganzer | Paul Douglas, John Derek, Jody Lawrance | Drama | Paramount |
| The Lieutenant Wore Skirts | Frank Tashlin | Tom Ewell, Sheree North, Rita Moreno | Comedy | 20th Century Fox |
| Lisbon | Ray Milland | Ray Milland, Maureen O'Hara, Yvonne Furneaux | Crime | Republic |
| The Lone Ranger | Stuart Heisler | Clayton Moore, Jay Silverheels, Bonita Granville | Western | Warner Bros. |
| Love Me Tender | Robert D. Webb | Elvis Presley, Debra Paget, Richard Egan, | Western | 20th Century Fox. Presley's first film |
| Lust for Life | Vincente Minnelli, George Cukor | Kirk Douglas, Anthony Quinn, Pamela Brown | Biography | MGM. Story of Vincent van Gogh; Oscar for Quinn |
| Magnificent Roughnecks | Sherman A. Rose | Jack Carson, Mickey Rooney, Nancy Gates | Comedy | Allied Artists |
| Man from Del Rio | Harry Horner | Anthony Quinn, Katy Jurado, Douglas Fowley | Western | United Artists |
| The Man in the Gray Flannel Suit | Nunnally Johnson | Gregory Peck, Jennifer Jones, Fredric March | Drama | 20th Century Fox. Based on Sloan Wilson novel |
| Man in the Vault | Andrew V. McLaglen | William Campbell, Anita Ekberg, Karen Sharpe | Crime | RKO |
| The Man Is Armed | Franklin Adreon | Dane Clark, William Talman, May Wynn | Crime | Republic |
| The Man Who Knew Too Much | Alfred Hitchcock | Doris Day, James Stewart, Bernard Miles | Film noir | Paramount. Remake of 1934 film; Oscar for Best Song |
| The Man Who Never Was | Ronald Neame | Clifton Webb, Gloria Grahame, Robert Flemyng | War thriller | 20th Century Fox. Co-production with the UK. |
| Manfish | W. Lee Wilder | John Bromfield, Lon Chaney Jr., Barbara Nichols | Adventure | United Artists |
| Massacre | Louis King | Dane Clark, James Craig, Martha Roth | Western | 20th Century Fox |
| The Maverick Queen | Joseph Kane | Barbara Stanwyck, Barry Sullivan, Scott Brady | Western | Republic |
| Meet Me in Las Vegas | Roy Rowland | Cyd Charisse, Dan Dailey, Agnes Moorehead | Musical | MGM |
| Miami Exposé | Fred F. Sears | Lee J. Cobb, Patricia Medina, Edward Arnold | Film noir | Columbia |
| Miracle in the Rain | Rudolph Maté | Jane Wyman, Van Johnson, Peggie Castle | Romance | Warner Bros. |
| Moby Dick | John Huston | Gregory Peck, Richard Basehart, James Robertson Justice | Adventure | Warner Bros. Based on Herman Melville novel |
| Mohawk | Kurt Neumann | Scott Brady, Lori Nelson, Rita Gam | Western | 20th Century Fox |
| The Mole People | Virgil W. Vogel | John Agar, Hugh Beaumont, Alan Napier | Science fiction | Universal |
| The Mountain | Edward Dmytryk | Spencer Tracy, Robert Wagner, Claire Trevor | Drama | Paramount |

== N-R ==
| Title | Director | Cast | Genre | Notes |
|---|---|---|---|---|
| Naked Gun | Eddie Dew | Willard Parker, Mara Corday, Barton MacLane | Western | Independent |
| Navy Wife | Edward Bernds | Joan Bennett, Gary Merrill, Shirley Yamaguchi | Comedy | Allied Artists |
| Never Say Goodbye | Jerry Hopper | Rock Hudson, Cornell Borchers, George Sanders | Drama | Universal; Remake of 1946 film |
| Nightmare | Maxwell Shane | Edward G. Robinson, Kevin McCarthy, Connie Russell | Film noir | United Artists; Remake of 1942 film |
| The Oklahoma Woman | Roger Corman | Peggie Castle, Richard Denning, Cathy Downs | Western | AIP |
| On the Threshold of Space | Robert D. Webb | Guy Madison, Virginia Leith, John Hodiak | Science fiction | 20th Century Fox; Hodiak's final film |
| The Opposite Sex | David Miller | June Allyson, Joan Collins, Ann Sheridan | Musical | MGM; remake of The Women |
| Our Miss Brooks | Al Lewis | Eve Arden, Gale Gordon, Robert Rockwell | Comedy | Warner Bros.; film version and series finale of TV series |
| Outside the Law | Jack Arnold | Ray Danton, Leigh Snowden, Grant Williams | Film noir | Universal |
| Over-Exposed | Lewis Seiler | Cleo Moore, Richard Crenna, Raymond Greenleaf | Film noir | Columbia |
| Pardners | Norman Taurog | Dean Martin, Jerry Lewis, Lori Nelson | Western comedy | Paramount. 15th Martin and Lewis film |
| Patterns | Fielder Cook | Van Heflin, Everett Sloane, Beatrice Straight | Drama | United Artists |
| The Peacemaker | Ted Post | James Mitchell, Rosemarie Bowe, Jan Merlin | Western | United Artists |
| Pillars of the Sky | George Marshall | Jeff Chandler, Dorothy Malone, Ward Bond | Western | Universal |
| Please Murder Me | Peter Godfrey | Raymond Burr, Angela Lansbury, Dick Foran | Film noir | Independent |
| The Power and the Prize | Henry Koster | Robert Taylor, Mary Astor, Cedric Hardwicke | Drama | MGM |
| The Price of Fear | Abner Biberman | Merle Oberon, Lex Barker, Gia Scala | Film noir | Universal |
| The Proud and Profane | George Seaton | William Holden, Deborah Kerr, Thelma Ritter | Drama | Paramount; 2 Oscar nominations |
| The Proud Ones | Robert D. Webb | Robert Ryan, Virginia Mayo, Jeffrey Hunter | Western | 20th Century Fox |
| Quincannon, Frontier Scout | Lesley Selander | Tony Martin, Peggie Castle, John Bromfield | Western | United Artists |
| The Rack | Arnold Laven | Paul Newman, Wendell Corey, Anne Francis | War drama | MGM. From a teleplay by Rod Serling |
| The Rainmaker | Joseph Anthony | Katharine Hepburn, Burt Lancaster, Wendell Corey | Romance western | Paramount; 2 Oscar nominations |
| Ransom! | Alex Segal | Glenn Ford, Donna Reed, Leslie Nielsen | Crime drama | MGM; remade in 1996 |
| Raw Edge | John Sherwood | Rory Calhoun, Yvonne De Carlo, Mara Corday | Western | Universal |
| The Rawhide Years | Rudolph Maté | Tony Curtis, Colleen Miller, Arthur Kennedy | Western | Universal |
| Rebel in Town | Alfred L. Werker | Ruth Roman, John Payne, J. Carrol Naish | Western | United Artists |
| Red Sundown | Jack Arnold | Rory Calhoun, Martha Hyer, Dean Jagger | Western | Universal |
| Reprisal! | George Sherman | Guy Madison, Felicia Farr, Kathryn Grant | Western | Columbia |
| The Revolt of Mamie Stover | Raoul Walsh | Jane Russell, Richard Egan, Joan Leslie | Drama | 20th Century Fox |
| Ride the High Iron | Don Weis | Don Taylor, Sally Forrest, Raymond Burr | Drama | Columbia |
| Rock Around the Clock | Fred F. Sears | Bill Haley, Alix Talton, Lisa Gaye | Musical | Columbia; inspired by song |
| Rock, Pretty Baby | Richard Bartlett | Sal Mineo, John Saxon, Luana Patten | Comedy | Universal |
| Rock, Rock, Rock | Will Price | Chuck Berry, Tuesday Weld, Teddy Randazzo | Musical | Independent |
| Rumble on the Docks | Fred F. Sears | James Darren, Michael Granger, Robert Blake | Film noir | Columbia |
| Runaway Daughters | Edward L. Cahn | Marla English, Mary Ellen Kay, Anna Sten | Drama | AIP |
| Running Target | Marvin R. Weinstein | Doris Dowling, Arthur Franz, Richard Reeves | Western | United Artists |
| Run for the Sun | Roy Boulting | Richard Widmark, Trevor Howard, Jane Greer | Thriller | United Artists |

== S-Z ==
| Title | Director | Cast | Genre | Notes |
|---|---|---|---|---|
| Safari | Terence Young | Victor Mature, Janet Leigh, John Justin | Adventure | Columbia. Co-production with the UK. |
| Santiago | Gordon Douglas | Alan Ladd, Rossana Podestà, Lloyd Nolan | Thriller | Warner Bros. |
| Scandal Incorporated | Edward Mann | Robert Hutton, Patricia Wright, Paul Richards | Crime | Republic |
| The Scarlet Hour | Michael Curtiz | Carol Ohmart, Tom Tryon, Jody Lawrence | Film noir | Paramount |
| Screaming Eagles | Charles F. Haas | Tom Tryon, Martin Milner, Jacqueline Beer | War | Allied Artists |
| The Search for Bridey Murphy | Noel Langley | Teresa Wright, Louis Hayward, Nancy Gates | Drama | Paramount |
| The Searchers | John Ford | John Wayne, Jeffrey Hunter, Vera Miles | Western | Warner Bros. Voted best American Western |
| Secret of Treasure Mountain | Seymour Friedman | Valerie French, Raymond Burr, William Prince | Western | Columbia |
| Serenade | Anthony Mann | Mario Lanza, Joan Fontaine, Sara Montiel | Musical | Warner Bros. |
| Seven Men from Now | Budd Boetticher | Randolph Scott, Gail Russell, Lee Marvin | Western | Warner Bros. |
| Shake, Rattle & Rock! | Edward L. Cahn | Mike Connors, Lisa Gaye, Sterling Holloway | Musical | AIP |
| The Sharkfighters | Jerry Hopper | Victor Mature, Karen Steele, James Olson | Adventure | United Artists |
| The She-Creature | Edward L. Cahn | Marla English, Chester Morris, Cathy Downs | Science fiction | AIP |
| Showdown at Abilene | Charles F. Haas | Jock Mahoney, Martha Hyer, Lyle Bettger | Western | Universal |
| Singing in the Dark | Max Nosseck | Moishe Oysher, Phyllis Hill, Joey Adams | Drama | Independent |
| Slightly Scarlet | Allan Dwan | John Payne, Rhonda Fleming, Arlene Dahl | Film noir | RKO |
| The Solid Gold Cadillac | Richard Quine | Judy Holliday, Paul Douglas, Fred Clark | Comedy | Columbia |
| Somebody Up There Likes Me | Robert Wise | Paul Newman, Pier Angeli, Sal Mineo | Biography | MGM. Story of Rocky Graziano; won two Oscars |
| Stagecoach to Fury | William F. Claxton | Forrest Tucker, Mari Blanchard, Wallace Ford | Western | 20th Century Fox |
| Star in the Dust | Charles F. Haas | John Agar, Mamie Van Doren, Richard Boone | Western | Universal |
| The Steel Jungle | Walter Doniger | Perry Lopez, Beverly Garland, Walter Abel | Crime | Warner Bros. |
| Storm Center | Daniel Taradash | Bette Davis, Brian Keith, Kim Hunter | Drama | Columbia |
| A Strange Adventure | William Witney | Joan Evans, Ben Cooper, Marla English | Drama | Republic |
| Strange Intruder | Irving Rapper | Ida Lupino, Edmund Purdom, Ann Harding | Drama | Allied Artists |
| Stranger at My Door | William Witney | Macdonald Carey, Patricia Medina, Skip Homeier | Western | Republic |
| The Swan | Charles Vidor | Grace Kelly, Louis Jourdan, Alec Guinness | Romance | MGM; remake of 1925 film |
| Tea and Sympathy | Vincente Minnelli | Deborah Kerr, John Kerr, Leif Erickson | Drama | MGM; based on the play |
| The Teahouse of the August Moon | Daniel Mann | Marlon Brando, Glenn Ford, Machiko Kyō | Comedy | MGM; based on the play |
| Teenage Rebel | Edmund Goulding | Ginger Rogers, Michael Rennie, Mildred Natwick | Drama | 20th Century Fox. 2 Oscar nominations |
| The Ten Commandments | Cecil B. DeMille | Charlton Heston, Yul Brynner, Edward G. Robinson | Drama | Paramount. Remake of 1923 film; 7 Oscar nominations; DeMille's final film |
| Tension at Table Rock | Charles Marquis Warren | Dorothy Malone, Richard Egan, Cameron Mitchell | Western | RKO |
| Terror at Midnight | Franklin Adreon | Scott Brady, Joan Vohs, Frank Faylen | Crime | Republic |
| That Certain Feeling | Melvin Frank | Bob Hope, Eva Marie Saint, Pearl Bailey | Comedy | Paramount |
| There's Always Tomorrow | Douglas Sirk | Barbara Stanwyck, Fred MacMurray, Joan Bennett | Drama | Universal. Remake of 1934 film |
| These Wilder Years | Roy Rowland | James Cagney, Barbara Stanwyck, Walter Pidgeon | Drama | MGM |
| Three Bad Sisters | Gilbert Kay | Marla English, John Bromfield, Kathleen Hughes | Drama | United Artists |
| Three Brave Men | Philip Dunne | Ray Milland, Ernest Borgnine, Nina Foch | Drama | 20th Century Fox |
| The Three Outlaws | Sam Newfield | Neville Brand, Alan Hale Jr., Bruce Bennett | Western | Independent |
| Thunder Over Arizona | Joseph Kane | Skip Homeier, Kristine Miller, George Macready | Western | Republic |
| Time Table | Mark Stevens | Mark Stevens, Felicia Farr, Marianne Stewart | Film noir | United Artists |
| Toward the Unknown | Mervyn LeRoy | William Holden, Virginia Leith, Lloyd Nolan | Drama | Warner Bros. |
| The Toy Tiger | Jerry Hopper | Laraine Day, Jeff Chandler, Cecil Kellaway | Comedy | Universal |
| Trapeze | Carol Reed | Burt Lancaster, Tony Curtis, Gina Lollobrigida | Drama | United Artists; Silver Bear award for Lancaster |
| Tribute to a Bad Man | Robert Wise | James Cagney, Stephen McNally, Don Dubbins | Western | MGM |
| The Unguarded Moment | Harry Keller | Esther Williams, George Nader, John Saxon | Film noir | Universal |
| Uranium Boom | William Castle | Dennis Morgan, Patricia Medina, William Talman | Adventure | Columbia |
| The Vagabond King | Michael Curtiz | Kathryn Grayson, Rita Moreno, Oreste Kirkop | Musical | Paramount; Grayson's final film |
| The Violent Years | William Morgan | Jean Moorhead, Barbara Weeks, I. Stanford Jolley | Crime | Independent |
| Walk the Proud Land | Jesse Hibbs | Audie Murphy, Anne Bancroft, Pat Crowley | Western | Universal |
| War and Peace | King Vidor | Audrey Hepburn, Henry Fonda, Mel Ferrer | Historical | Paramount. Based on Leo Tolstoy novel; 3 Oscar nominations |
| The Werewolf | Fred F. Sears | Don Megowan, Joyce Holden, Harry Lauter | Horror | Columbia |
| Westward Ho the Wagons! | William Beaudine | Fess Parker, Kathleen Crowley, John War Eagle | Western | Disney |
| Wetbacks | Hank McCune | Lloyd Bridges, Nancy Gates, Barton MacLane | Crime | Independent |
| When Gangland Strikes | R. G. Springsteen | Raymond Greenleaf, Marjie Millar, John Hudson | Crime | Republic |
| While the City Sleeps | Fritz Lang | Dana Andrews, Vincent Price, Ida Lupino | Film noir | RKO |
| The White Squaw | Ray Nazarro | David Brian, May Wynn, William Bishop | Western | Columbia |
| The Wild Party | Harry Horner | Anthony Quinn, Carol Ohmart, Arthur Franz | Film noir | United Artists |
| A Woman's Devotion | Paul Henreid | Janice Rule, Ralph Meeker, Rosenda Monteros | Film noir | Republic |
| The Women of Pitcairn Island | Jean Yarbrough | James Craig, Lynn Bari, Sue England | Adventure | 20th Century Fox |
| World in My Corner | Jesse Hibbs | Audie Murphy, Barbara Rush, Jeff Morrow | Sports | Universal |
| World Without End | Edward Bernds | Hugh Marlowe, Nancy Gates, Rod Taylor | Science fiction | Allied Artists |
| Written on the Wind | Douglas Sirk | Rock Hudson, Lauren Bacall, Dorothy Malone | Drama | Universal. Oscar for Malone |
| The Wrong Man | Alfred Hitchcock | Henry Fonda, Vera Miles, Anthony Quayle | Film noir | Warner Bros. |
| Yaqui Drums | Jean Yarbrough | Rod Cameron, Mary Castle, J. Carrol Naish | Western | Allied Artists |
| You Can't Run Away from It | Dick Powell | June Allyson, Jack Lemmon, Charles Bickford | Musical | Columbia |
| The Young Guns | Albert Band | Russ Tamblyn, Gloria Talbott, Perry Lopez | Western | Allied Artists |

== Documentaries and serials ==
| Title | Director | Cast | Genre | Notes |
|---|---|---|---|---|
| Blazing the Overland Trail | Spencer Bennet | Lee Roberts | Serial | Columbia |
| Perils of the Wilderness | Spencer Bennet | Evelyn Anderson, Dennis Moore | Serial | Columbia |
| Seven Wonders of the World | Tay Garnett & others | Lowell Thomas | Documentary | |

== See also ==
- 1956 in the United States

== Sources ==
=== References ===
- Weaver, Tom (2006). Interviews with B Science Fiction and Horror Movie Makers. McFarland. ISBN 0786428589.
- Warren, Bill (2009). Keep Watching the Skies!: American Science Fiction Movies of the Fifties, The 21st Century Edition. McFarland. ISBN 978-0786442300.
