= Perils of the Wilderness =

1956 film by Spencer Gordon Bennet

- Directed by: Spencer Gordon Bennet (as Spencer G. Bennet)
- Screenplay by: George H. Plympton
- Story by: George H. Plympton
- Produced by: Sam Katzman
- Starring: Dennis Moore
- Cinematography: Ira H. Morgan
- Production company: Sam Katzman Productions
- Distributed by: Columbia Pictures
- Release date: January 6, 1956
- Running time: 257 minutes (15 episodes)
- Country: United States
- Language: English

Perils of the Wilderness is a 1956 American Western serial film directed by Spencer Gordon Bennet and starring Dennis Moore.

== Plot ==
U.S. Deputy Marshal Dan Lawson teams with RCMP Sergeant Gray to go undercover and capture the nefarious smuggler Bart Randall. Lawson, posing as an outlaw called Laramie, is ready to infiltrate the gang led by Randall, who is wanted for murder and bank robbery in the United States. In addition to the difficulties inherent in the mission, Lawson must deal with other issues, including the use of a fake totem and flying a hydraplane to awe the menacing Indians and renegade whites. He is aided in his search by Donna Blaine, who is suspected at first of giving information to Randall, but who is really a Canadian secret agent investigating Randall's illegal gun trading with the Indians.

== Cast ==
- Dennis Moore as Deputy Marshal Dan Mason, a.k.a. Laramie
- Richard Emory as Sergeant Gray
- Evelyn Finley as Donna Blaine (as Eve Anderson)
- Kenneth MacDonald as Bart Randall (as Kenneth R. MacDonald)
- Rick Vallin as Little Bear
- John Elliott as Homer Lynch
- Don C. Harvey as Kruger
- Terry Frost as Batiste
- Al Ferguson as Mike
- Bud Osborne as Jake
- Rex Lease as Sergeant Jim Rodney
- Pierce Lyden as Amby
- John Mitchum as Brent

== Production ==
Perils of the Wilderness was the third of producer Sam Katzman's four ultra-low-budget adventure serials, filmed in the twilight of serial production. Most of the action scenes were lifted from older Columbia serials, with new leading men wearing the same costumes to match the old footage, and some of the original cast members brought back to film new scenes.

In late 1953 producer Sam Katzman announced that he was canceling serial production, only to reconsider after a host of exhibitors deluged Katzman with letters of protest. This was front-page news in Variety. Katzman, who had already written off the serials from his budgetary plans, now had to fit them back in, squeezing the time and money tighter than ever. Instead of making more new productions from scratch, he slashed the budgets and production schedules to all-time lows for Riding with Buffalo Bill (1954) and Adventures of Captain Africa (1955).

The production of Adventures of Captain Africa was troubled, and Katzman had to overspend to salvage it. This compelled Columbia's New York office -- which controlled what the studio produced -- to instruct Katzman to stop making serials after the Captain Africa project was completed. Once again, exhibitors had the last word. Variety, in a 1955 item titled "Serials Still Alive", reported, "Exhibs, learning of producer's plans to do away with chapter plays, beefed and Katzman heeded their pleas." Katzman complied grudgingly and made two last serials.

Perils of the Wilderness (filmed in June 1955, released in January 1956) consisted mostly of chunks from Perils of the Royal Mounted (1942) and The Mysterious Pilot (1937). This was followed by Columbia's final serial, Blazing the Overland Trail (1956), a mashup of White Eagle (1941) and Overland with Kit Carson (1940), with Lee Roberts and Dennis Moore costumed to match Buck Jones and Bill Elliott, respectively. The action in these last two cliffhangers was so threadbare that the new scenes showed the heroes watching the big action scenes and discussing them, instead of actually participating in them.

== Reception ==
Only one trade publication took the time to review this serial, and then only the first chapter. The Exhibitor judged it "fair" and commented, "This serial has an excessive amount of gunplay and action which should satisfy requirements."

== Chapter titles ==
1. The Voice from the Sky
2. The Mystery Plane
3. The Mine of Menace
4. Ambush for a Mountie
5. Laramie's Desperate Chance
6. Trapped in the Flaming Forest
7. Out of the Trap
8. Laramie Rides Alone
9. Menace of the Medicine Man
10. Midnight Marauders
11. The Falls of Fate
12. Rescue from the Rapids
13. Little Bear Pays a Debt
14. The Mystery Plane Flies Again
15. Laramie Gets His Man

== See also ==
- List of American films of 1956
