= Blake of Scotland Yard =

Blake of Scotland Yard may refer to:

- Blake of Scotland Yard (1927 serial), a Universal film serial directed by Robert F. Hill
- Blake of Scotland Yard (1937 serial), a Victory Pictures film serial directed by Robert F. Hill
