= Rick Vallin =

American actor (1902–1977)

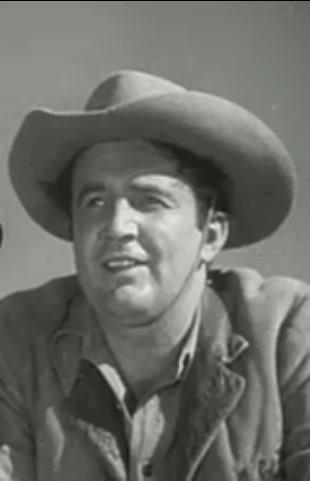
- Vallin in Raiders of Old California (1957)
- Born: Eric Efron; September 24, 1919; Feodosia, Russia
- Died: August 31, 1977 (aged 57); Los Angeles, California, U.S.
- Resting place: Eden Memorial Park Cemetery in Mission Hills, California
- Other name: Eric George Efron
- Years active: 1938–1966

Rick Vallin (born Eric Efron; September 24, 1919 – August 31, 1977) was an actor who appeared in more than 150 films between 1938 and 1966.

== Early years ==
Born in Feodosia, in Crimea, Russian Soviet Federative Socialist Republic, Vallin came to the United States at age three with his mother, Mrs. Nadja Yatsenko Efron, on the S/S Muskegon, which arrived at the Port of Boston on May 6, 1922. His father, an officer of the Imperial Russian Army, was murdered by the Bolsheviks. His mother, known as Nadja Yatsenko (Efron), was a ballerina in Tsarist Russia; her father was a Crimean landlord. In the States, she was billed as a Gypsy dancer and was an actress in silent films.

== Career ==
In 1940, Vallin (billed as Eric Efron) acted on stage with the Hollytown Theater. He started his Hollywood career with an uncredited part in the film Freshman Year and played minor roles in feature films at various studios. In 1942, he joined the Pasadena Playhouse, and received his first co-star billing in the film The Panther's Claw together with Sidney Blackmer, and showed promise in Secrets of a Co-Ed with Otto Kruger.

Vallin's fortunes improved in 1943 when he was hired as the villain in the East Side Kids comedy Clancy Street Boys. Producer Sam Katzman liked Vallin's darkly handsome looks and convincing delivery of dialogue, and cast him first as a juvenile lead (in Ghosts on the Loose) and then as a full-fledged leading man (in Vallin's only starring film, Smart Guy). When producer Katzman moved from Monogram Pictures to Columbia Pictures, he took Rick Vallin with him. This sealed Vallin's fate as a player in low-budget B movies, but it also gave him more than 10 years of job security. Vallin worked steadily in many of Katzman's features and serials, playing a variety of character roles: streetwise reporters, sinister villains, heroic internationals, and savage natives. His voice was also heard as the narrator of coming-attractions trailers.

Occasionally he showed up in such television series as Brave Eagle, Sheriff of Cochise, Bat Masterson, Jefferson Drum, The Adventures of Wild Bill Hickok, The Lone Ranger and Wyatt Earp. He was also cast on The Adventures of Superman, as well in both The Gene Autry Show and The Roy Rogers Show. His last appearance was a guest role on Daniel Boone in 1966.

== Death ==
Vallin died in Los Angeles, California, at the age of 57. He is interred at Eden Memorial Park in Mission Hills, California.

== Selected filmography ==
=== Films ===
- Freshman Year (1938) - Upperclassman (uncredited)
- Dramatic School (1938) - Student (uncredited)
- Newsboys' Home (1938) - Newsboy (uncredited)
- Desperate Cargo (1941) - Radioman Stevens
- Escort Girl (1941) - Jack
- The Corsican Brothers (1941) - De Revenau's Friend at Opera (uncredited)
- Pardon My Stripes (1942) - Red (uncredited)
- Sleepytime Gal (1942) - Clerk (uncredited)
- The Panther's Claw (1942) - Anthony 'Tony' Abbot
- Flying with Music (1942) - Juan Breganza (uncredited)
- Perils of the Royal Mounted (1942, Serial) - Little Wolf
- Friendly Enemies (1942) - Soldier (uncredited)
- King of the Stallions (1942) - Sina-Oga (Little Coyote)
- Youth on Parade (1942) - Customer (uncredited)
- Secrets of a Co-Ed (1942) - Nick Jordan
- Stand By All Networks (1942) - Sound Control Room Engineer (uncredited)
- Lady from Chungking (1942) - Rodney Carr
- A Night for Crime (1943) - Arthur Evans - Chauffeur
- Corregidor (1943) - Cpl. Pinky Mason
- Clancy Street Boys (1943) - George Mooney
- Riders of the Rio Grande (1943) - Tom Owens
- Ghosts on the Loose (1943) - Jack
- Isle of Forgotten Sins (1943) - Johnny Pacific
- Wagon Tracks West (1943) - Dr. John Fleetwing
- Nearly Eighteen (1943) - Tony Morgan
- Smart Guy (1943) - Johnny Reagan
- The Desert Song (1943) - French Officer (uncredited)
- The Desert Hawk (1944, Serial) - (uncredited)
- Army Wives (1944) - Barney
- Secrets of a Sorority Girl (1945) - Paul Reynolds
- Dangerous Money (1946) - Tao Erickson
- Northwest Outpost (1947) - Dovkin
- Last of the Redmen (1947) - Uncas
- The Sea Hound (1947, Serial) - Manila Pete
- Two Blondes and a Redhead (1947) - Freddie Ainsley
- Brick Bradford (1947, Serial) - Sandy Sanderson
- Queen Esther: A Story from the Bible (1947) - Joram
- Bob and Sally (1948) - Jim Cooper
- Jungle Jim (1948) - Kolu - Chief of the Masai
- Tarzan's Magic Fountain (1949) - Mountain Leader, Flaming Arrow Shooter (uncredited)
- Shamrock Hill (1949) - Oliver Matthews
- Tuna Clipper (1949) - Silvestre Pereira
- Batman and Robin (1949, Serial) - Barry Brown
- Adventures of Sir Galahad (1949, Serial) - Sir Gawain
- Life of St. Paul Series (1949, Serial) - Man in Lystra
- Killer Shark (1950) - Joe - crewman
- Cody of the Pony Express (1950, Serial) - Henchman Denver [Chs.1-4]
- Comanche Territory (1950) - Pakanah
- Captive Girl (1950) - Chief Mahala
- State Penitentiary (1950) - Tom - Prison Guard
- Snow Dog (1950) - Louis Blanchard
- Atom Man vs. Superman (1950, Serial) - Power Company Truck Worker [Ch. 9] (uncredited)
- Rio Grande Patrol (1950) - Capt. Alberto Trevino
- Counterspy Meets Scotland Yard (1950) - Agent McCullough
- Revenue Agent (1950) - Al Chaloopka - Henchman
- Fighting Coast Guard (1951) - Marine (uncredited)
- Roar of the Iron Horse - Rail-Blazer of the Apache Trail (1951, Serial) - White Eagle [Chs. 1–3, 6, 12] (uncredited)
- When the Redskins Rode (1951) - Duprez (uncredited)
- Hurricane Island (1951) - Coba (uncredited)
- Jungle Manhunt (1951) - Matusa Chief Bono
- Yellow Fin (1951) - Jan
- The Magic Carpet (1951) - Abdul
- Captain Video: Master of the Stratosphere (1951, Serial) - Ranger Brown [Chs. 7–8, 11, 13] (uncredited)
- Lone Star (1952) - Apache Brave (uncredited)
- Aladdin and His Lamp (1952) - Captain of the Guard
- King of the Congo (1952, Serial) - Andreov
- Thief of Damascus (1952) - Gate Guard (uncredited)
- Blackhawk (1952, Serial) - Stan / Boris
- Strange Fascination (1952) - Carlo
- Son of Geronimo: Apache Avenger (1952, Serial) - Henchman Eadie
- Woman in the Dark (1952) - Phil Morello
- Voodoo Tiger (1952) - Sgt. Bono
- Star of Texas (1953) - Texas Ranger William Vance
- The Homesteaders (1953) - Slim
- Salome (1953) - Sailor (uncredited)
- Trail Blazers (1953) - Officer Lundig
- The Marksman (1953) - Leo Santee
- Topeka (1953) - Ray Hammond
- Fighting Lawman (1953) - Manuel Jackson
- The Golden Idol (1954) - Abdullah
- Ma and Pa Kettle at Home (1954) - Indian (uncredited)
- Thunder Pass (1954) - Reeger
- Riding with Buffalo Bill (1954, Serial) - Reb Morgan
- Sign of the Pagan (1954) - Cavalry Officer (uncredited)
- Day of Triumph (1954) - James
- Bowery to Bagdad (1955) - Selim
- Treasure of Ruby Hills (1955) - Robert Vernon
- Dial Red O (1955) - Deputy Clark
- The Man from Bitter Ridge (1955) - Townsman (uncredited)
- The Adventures of Captain Africa (1955, Serial) - Ted Arnold
- King of the Carnival (1955, Serial) - Art Kerr
- The Scarlet Coat (1955) - Mounted Lieutenant Escorting Maj. Andre (uncredited)
- At Gunpoint (1955) - Moore (uncredited)
- Perils of the Wilderness (1956, Serial) - Little Bear
- Terror at Midnight (1956) - Police Officer Gaudino
- Frontier Gambler (1956) - Gambler #3 (uncredited)
- Three for Jamie Dawn (1956) - Policeman (uncredited)
- Gun Brothers (1956) - Gomez (uncredited)
- Fighting Trouble (1956) - Vic Savinie (uncredited)
- You Can't Run Away from It (1956) - Reporter (uncredited)
- Naked Gun (1956) - Savage (henchman)
- Untamed Mistress (1956) - Henchman
- The Storm Rider (1957) - Jack Feylan (uncredited)
- The Badge of Marshal Brennan (1957) - Deputy Jody
- Jet Pilot (1957) - Sergeant (uncredited)
- Raiders of Old California (1957) - Burt
- The Tijuana Story (1957) - Ricardo - Club Manager (uncredited)
- Escape from Red Rock (1957) - Judd Bowman
- Bullwhip (1958) - Marshal Hendricks
- Pier 5, Havana (1959) - Pablo (uncredited)
- The Wizard of Baghdad (1960) - Guard (uncredited)
- The Quick Gun (1964) - Johnson (uncredited)

=== Television shows ===
- The Adventures of Kit Carson (1952–1953) - Henchman / Piney / Bob Mason / Deputy Marton / Henchman
- Hopalong Cassidy (1952–1954) - Marco Rodriguez / Ramon Torres / Dr. Johnny Tall Horse
- The Adventures of Wild Bill Hickok (1952–1956) - Pete / Henchman Melford / Frank Norton
- Death Valley Days (1953) Lieutenant Bob Hastings / Rod Ross
- The Gene Autry Show (1953–1954) - Yancy - Gunslinger henchman / Vasco - Gang Leader / Doc McCoy / Big Tim Brady
- The Roy Rogers Show (1953–1957) - Stanton / Jim Wilson
- Annie Oakley (1954–1956) - Henchman Al / Al / Billy / The Abilene Kid / Joe McGee / Doyle / Gil Warren / Johnny Storm / Outlaw
- Wyatt Earp (1955–1956) - Zach Newcombe / Buff Yancy
- The Lone Ranger (1955–1957) - Blue Feather / Crazy Wolf
- Adventures of Superman (1955–1958) - Pallini the Human Fly / Rick Sable / Pruitt - Thug #1 / Scarface
- Four Star Playhouse (1956) - Officer
- Highway Patrol (1957) - Simpson
- Official Detective (1957, US TV series episode "The Man With The Goatee") - Goatee
- The Adventures of Rin Tin Tin (1957) - Pacing Bear / Gahewa
- M Squad (1958) - 'Blue Indigo' Requestor at Ballroom
- Bat Masterson (1961) - Jenks
- The Prisoner (1966)
- Daniel Boone (1966) - Sentry (final appearance)
