= Blazing the Overland Trail =

1956 film

- Theatrical release poster
- Directed by: Spencer Gordon Bennet
- Screenplay by: George H. Plympton
- Story by: George H. Plympton
- Produced by: Sam Katzman
- Starring: Lee Roberts; Dennis Moore
- Cinematography: Ira H. Morgan
- Edited by: Earl Turner
- Color process: Black and white
- Production company: Sam Katzman Productions
- Distributed by: Columbia Pictures
- Release date: August 4, 1956
- Running time: (15 episodes)
- Country: United States
- Language: English

Blazing the Overland Trail is a 1956 American western serial film directed by Spencer Gordon Bennet and starring Lee Roberts. It was the 57th and last serial produced by Columbia Pictures, and the last American serial ever produced for theaters. Universal Pictures had disbanded its serial unit in 1946 with The Mysterious Mr. M, and Republic Pictures had ceased serial production in 1955 with King of the Carnival. It is the last American-produced theatrical film serial.

== Plot ==
Rance Devlin intends to build his own empire in the American West, using his gang of masked horsemen "the Black Raiders" and his alliance with savage Indians to do so. Only U.S. Army scout Tom Bridger, allied with Pony Express rider Ed Marr and cavalry captain Frank Carter, can stop him.

== Cast ==
- Lee Roberts as Tom Bridger
- Dennis Moore as Ed Marr
- Norma Brooks as Lola Martin
- Gregg Barton as Capt. Frank Carter
- Don C. Harvey as Rance Devlin
- Lee Morgan as Alby
- Pierce Lyden as Bragg
- Edward Coch as Carl
- Reed Howes as Dunn
- Kermit Maynard as Al
- Pete Kellett as Pete
- Al Ferguson as Fergie

== Production ==
Serial producer Sam Katzman was still making entirely new science-fiction and action serials, with original stories and fresh supporting casts, through 1953. Late that year Katzman announced that he was canceling serial production, only to reconsider after a host of exhibitors deluged him with letters of protest. This was front-page news in Variety. Katzman, who had already written off the serials from his budgetary plans, now had to fit them back in, squeezing the time and money tighter than ever. Instead of making more new productions from scratch, he turned to Columbia's film library and manufactured each new serial by cutting up and combining two old ones. He slashed the budgets and production schedules to all-time lows for Riding with Buffalo Bill (1954) and Adventures of Captain Africa (1955). Only a few new scenes were scripted, to tie the chunks of old film together.

The production of Adventures of Captain Africa was troubled, owing to refilming much of it for legal reasons, and Katzman had to overspend to salvage it. This compelled Columbia's New York office -- which controlled what the studio produced -- to instruct Katzman to stop making serials after the Captain Africa project was completed. Once again, exhibitors had the last word. Variety, in a 1955 item titled "Serials Still Alive", reported, "Exhibs, learning of producer's plans to do away with chapter plays, beefed and Katzman heeded their pleas." Katzman complied grudgingly and made two last serials. Perils of the Wilderness (filmed in June 1955, released in January 1956) consisted mostly of chunks from Perils of the Royal Mounted (1942) and The Mysterious Pilot (1937).

Blazing the Overland Trail was the last of Sam Katzman's four ultra-low-budget adventure serials, filmed in the twilight of serial production. Most of the action scenes were lifted from two older serials, White Eagle and Overland with Kit Carson. Lee Roberts is costumed to match old footage of Buck Jones, and Dennis Moore is dressed to match even older shots of Bill Elliott. New shots are noticeably cheap, with only two or three people on camera (while the old stock shots have entire ensembles). The action is so threadbare that the new scenes show the heroes watching the big action scenes and discussing them, instead of actually participating in them. Even the henchmen are generic, with random character names beginning with A, B, C, and D.

Unlike many long-running series that were abruptly canceled without advance notice, Columbia and Katzman had definitely agreed that Blazing the Overland Trail would be the final serial. It was filmed in November and December of 1955 and released in August of 1956. Thereafter, Columbia began reissuing its older serials to theaters, at the rate of three per year. Columbia discontinued its three-per-year schedule in 1966; its revival of the Batman serial was extremely successful and inspired the Batman television series.

Most trade journals had stopped reviewing serials by the 1950s; only Motion Picture Exhibitor published a report on Blazing the Overland Trail, and then it was only a plot synopsis. The only critical remark about the quality was a single word: "Fair".

== Chapter titles ==
1. Gun Emperor of the West
2. Riding the Danger Trail
3. The Black Riders
4. Into the Flames
5. Trapped in the Runaway Wagon
6. Rifles for Redskins
7. Midnight Attack
8. Blast at Gunstock Pass
9. War at the Wagon Camp
10. Buffalo Stampede
11. Into the Fiery Blast
12. Cave-in
13. Bugle Call
14. Blazing Peril
15. Raiders Unmasked

_{Source:}

== See also ==
- List of American films of 1956
- List of film serials by year
- List of film serials by studio

| Preceded by Perils of the Wilderness (1956) | Columbia Serial; Blazing the Overland Trail (1956) | Succeeded by none |
