= A Yank in Indo-China =

1952 film by Wallace Grissell

- Directed by: Wallace Grissell
- Written by: Samuel Newman
- Produced by: Sam Katzman
- Starring: John Archer; Douglas Dick; Jean Willes
- Cinematography: William P. Whitley
- Edited by: Aaron Stell
- Music by: Ross DiMaggio
- Production company: Sam Katzman Productions
- Distributed by: Columbia Pictures
- Release date: April 3, 1952
- Running time: 67 minutes
- Country: United States
- Language: English

A Yank in Indo-China is a 1952 American war film directed by Wallace Grissell and starring John Archer, Douglas Dick and Jean Willes. It was produced by Sam Katzman for distribution by Columbia Pictures. The film's sets were designed by the art director Paul Palmentola. It was one of the few American films to be set during the First Indochina War. It was inspired by the success of A Yank in Korea (1951), also by producer Sam Katzman.

== Plot ==
Two American flyers operating a business in Indo China become involved with communists.

== Cast ==
- John Archer as Mulvaney
- Douglas Dick as Clint Marshall
- Jean Willes as Cleo
- Maura Murphy as Ellen Philips
- Hayward Soo Hoo as Jake
- Don C. Harvey as Swede Philips
- Harold Fong as Captain Sung Minh
- Rory Mallinson as Prof. William Marlow
- Leonard Penn as Colonel Sablon
- Kam Tong as Major Lao Kay
- Pierre Watkin as Kingston
- Peter Chong as General Wang
