= Mr. Muggs Rides Again =

1945 film by Wallace Fox

- Directed by: Wallace Fox
- Written by: Harvey Gates
- Produced by: Sam Katzman; Jack Dietz
- Starring: Leo Gorcey; Huntz Hall; Billy Benedict
- Cinematography: Ira H. Morgan
- Edited by: William Austin
- Music by: Edward J. Kay
- Distributed by: Monogram Pictures Corporation
- Release date: July 15, 1945
- Running time: 63 minutes
- Country: United States
- Language: English

Mr. Muggs Rides Again is a 1945 American comedy film, directed by Wallace Fox and starring The East Side Kids.

== Plot ==
After an electric "buzzing" device is found near his winning horse Turnabout, jockey Muggs McGinnis is questioned by track officials. Despite his protests that Turnabout's owner, gambler Dollar Davis, and his righthand man, Gaby O'Neill, planted the device on Turnabout so that they could bet against him, Muggs is suspended indefinitely from horseracing. Embittered, Muggs is about to quit racing forever when he and his gang of friends, The East Side Kids, learn that Mrs. Nora Brown, whom they call "Ma," is about to lose her stable because of an unpaid feed bill. Pooling their savings, Muggs and the boys give Ma enough money to pay her debt, which had been bought up by the scheming Davis. Muggs then insists on caring for Sweet Alice, Ma's other horse, who has a lame leg. After sneaking Alice into the gang's clubhouse in New York's East Side, Muggs tricks an orthopedic specialist into examining her.

Although Alice eventually recovers, her presence in the clubhouse is discovered by a policeman, who threatens to arrest the entire gang. Before they are hauled off to jail, however, Ma shows up with her niece Elsie. Having won several races with her prize horse Storm Cloud, Ma is now solvent and able to reclaim Alice and to offer the gang jobs. Ma is anxious to enter Storm Cloud in the upcoming handicap race and agrees to enter Alice too, as a way to boost Storm Cloud's enthusiasm. When Elsie, who is becoming romantically involved with Gaby against Muggs's stern advice, announces she is consulting a fortune teller about the race, Muggs, Glimpy, and Skinny decide to follow her to the local fair. There, Glimpy dons the drunken fortune-teller's disguise and offers to "tell" Elsie's fortune. After Glimpy condemns Gaby, a former East Side Kid, as a double-crosser, a confused Elsie runs away crying. Muggs then calls Gaby a "four-flusher" to his face, and later, a guilt-ridden Gaby announces to Davis that he is quitting. Davis, however, orders thugs Joe English and Mike Hanlin to kill Gaby and drug Storm Cloud, the only horse he believes is capable of beating Turnabout in the handicap. When the boys find Storm Cloud drugged and unable to race, they immediately assume Gaby is guilty.

Muggs and Elsie drive to the city to confront Gaby, and on the way, Elsie reveals that Ma wants to win the race because she is terminally ill and needs money for medical and funeral expenses. By the time they arrive at Gaby's, he has been shot and is on his way to the hospital. Unable to question Gaby, Muggs returns to Ma, who announces her decision not to run either horse in the race. Later, however, Ma learns that Gaby has recovered enough to talk and is willing to clear Muggs. When Davis hears the news, he sends Hanlin and English to finish the job on Gaby, and the thugs arrive at the hospital at the same time as Muggs and the gang. The boys quickly overwhelm the would-be killers and sneak Gaby out of the hospital. As Gaby and the gang race to meet with the racing official, they are pursued by Hanlin and English. The boys out-drive their enemies and burst into the official's office in time for Gaby to clear Muggs. The official then declares Muggs eligible to race in the handicap, and the next day, Muggs rides Alice to victory. Later, newlyweds Gaby and Elsie take off on their honeymoon with a grateful Ma.

== Cast ==
=== The East Side Kids ===
- Leo Gorcey as Ethelbert Aloysius 'Muggs' McGinnis
- Huntz Hall as Glimpy
- Billy Benedict as Skinny
- Johnny Duncan as Squeegie Robinson
- Buddy Gorman as Danny (a.k.a. Sam)
- Mende Koenig as Sam (a.k.a. Danny)

=== Additional Cast ===
- Minerva Urecal as Nora 'Ma' Brown
- Nancy Brinckman as Elsie Brown
- Bernard Thomas as Gaby O'Nell (a.k.a. Gaby Dell)
- George Meeker as Dollar Davis
- John H. Allen as Scruno
- Piere Watkin as Dr. Feltcher
- Milton Kibbee as Veterinarian
- Frank Jaquet as Steward Farnsworth
- Bernard Gorcey as Meyer
- I. Stanford Jolley as Mike Hanlin
- Michael Owen as Joe English
- Betty Sinclair as Nurse
- Forrest Taylor as Mike

== Production ==
- This is the only film in which Johnny Duncan is a member of the East Side Kids.
- Also appearing in this film is John H. Allen as 'Scruno'. While having the same character name as former East Side Kid "Sunshine Sammy" Morrison, the actual character appears to be different.
- Muggs' middle name is revealed to be "Aloysius". Leo Gorcey would later adopt this as his character middle name in The Bowery Boys films.
