= The Fighting Coward =

The Fighting Coward can refer to:

- The Fighting Coward (1924 film), a comedy
- The Fighting Coward (1935 film), a crime film
