= Robert E. Kent =

American screenwriter (1911–1984)

Robert E. Kent (August 31, 1911 in Canal Zone, Panama – December 11, 1984 in Los Angeles) was an American film writer and film producer.

== Career ==
Kent began as a rapid screenwriter for Sam Katzman at Columbia. For seven years he worked as a writer and story editor at Columbia.

He then became a producer for Edward Small. He used the pseudonym James B. Gordon for some of his work,

According to Filmink, Kent "wasn’t bad creating female characters for these sort of movies (at least compared to others made around this time)."

He later formed his own production company, and Admiral Productions together with Grant Whytock and Edward Small. Admiral produced two horror films with Vincent Price and four Westerns with Audie Murphy.

Robert E. Kent died in 1984.

== Selected filmography ==
- Paid to Dance (1937)
- Juvenile Court (1938)
- Gambling on the High Seas (1940)
- Always a Bride (1940)
- Father Is a Prince (1940)
- Calling All Husbands (1940)
- Ladies Must Live (1940)
- The Case of the Black Parrot (1941)
- Bad Men of Missouri (1941)
- Spy Ship (1942)
- Bullet Scars (1942)
- I Was Framed (1942)
- Adventure in Iraq (1943)
- Truck Busters (1943)
- Murder on the Waterfront (1943)
- Gildersleeve on Broadway (1943)
- Find the Blackmailer (1943)
- Two O'Clock Courage (1945)
- The Falcon in San Francisco (1945)
- Dick Tracy vs. Cueball (1946)
- Philo Vance Returns (1947)
- Gas House Kids Go West (1947)
- Dick Tracy Meets Gruesome (1947)
- Gas House Kids in Hollywood (1947)
- The Reckless Moment (1949)
- Where the Sidewalk Ends (1950)
- Last of the Buccaneers (1950)
- Drums of Tahiti (1951)
- When the Redskins Rode (1951)
- Thief of Damascus (1952)
- The Golden Hawk (1952)
- California Conquest (1952)
- Brave Warrior (1952)
- Flame of Calcutta (1953)
- The Pathfinder (1953)
- The Miami Story (1954)
- Charge of the Lancers (1954)
- Rock Around the Clock (1956)
- The Werewolf (1956)
- The Houston Story (1956)
- Miami Exposé (1956)
- Don't Knock the Rock (1956)
- Monkey on My Back (1957)
- Chicago Confidential (1957)
- Gun Duel in Durango (1957)
- Badman's Country (1958)
- Invisible Invaders (1959)
- Twist Around the Clock (1961)
- Don't Knock the Twist (1962)
- Diary of a Madman (1963)
- Twice-Told Tales (1963)
- Get Yourself a College Girl (1964)
- The Quick Gun (1964)
- When the Boys Meet the Girls (1965)
- Hold On! (1966)
- Hot Rods to Hell (1967)
- The Fastest Guitar Alive (1967)
- A Time to Sing (1968)
- The Christine Jorgensen Story (1970)
