= Sweet Genevieve =

1947 film by Arthur Dreifuss

- Directed by: Arthur Dreifuss
- Written by: Arthur Dreifuss; James Brewer
- Produced by: Sam Katzman
- Starring: Jean Porter; Jimmy Lydon; Lucien Littlefield
- Cinematography: Ira H. Morgan
- Edited by: Richard Fantl
- Music by: Irving Gertz
- Production company: Sam Katzman Productions
- Distributed by: Columbia Pictures
- Release date: October 23, 1947
- Running time: 68 minutes
- Country: United States
- Language: English

Sweet Genevieve is a 1947 American comedy film directed by Arthur Dreifuss and starring Jean Porter, Jimmy Lydon and Lucien Littlefield. It was produced by Sam Katzman for distribution by Columbia Pictures.

== Plot ==
The town of River City is obsessing whether the high school basketball team will win the championship, leading to an outbreak of betting. Meanwhile, Genevieve is concerned that her father has fallen for the school principal's secretary.

== Cast ==
- Jean Porter as Genevieve Rogers
- Jimmy Lydon as Bill Kennedy
- Gloria Marlen as Susan Adams
- Ralph Hodges as Aloysuis
- Lucien Littlefield as Mr. Rogers
- Tom Batten as Smiley
- Kirk Alyn as Dr. Wright
- Bryant Washburn as Harding Jones
- Virginia Belmont as Gloria Martin

== Production ==
The film was announced in February 1947.

Filming started in April 1947.
