= Screencraft Productions =

American film production company

Screencraft Productions was a short lived production company which worked out of Hollywood in the 1930s. Sam Katzman was production supervisor. It was linked with Showmen's Pictures.
