= Jungle Manhunt =

1951 science fiction film directed by Lew Landers

- Film Poster
- Directed by: Lew Landers
- Written by: Samuel Newman
- Based on: Jungle Jim; 1934-1954 comic strip by Don Moore and Alex Raymond
- Produced by: Sam Katzman
- Starring: Johnny Weissmuller; Bob Waterfield
- Cinematography: William Whitley
- Edited by: Henry Batista
- Music by: Mischa Bakaleinikoff
- Distributed by: Columbia Pictures
- Release date: October 4, 1951
- Running time: 66 minutes
- Country: United States
- Language: English

Jungle Manhunt is a 1951 adventure film written by Samuel Newman and directed by Lew Landers. It is the seventh entry in the Jungle Jim series of films starring Johnny Weissmuller as the title character. Based on the comic strip Jungle Jim created by Alex Raymond.

== Plot ==
In the African jungles, local tribes are terrorized by costumed skeleton people who kidnap the men of a local village. However, Bono. the local chieftain is able to escape. Jungle Jim rescues a photographer, Anne Lawrence, when her boat overturns She explains that she is searching for football player Bob Miller (played by real-life footballer Bob Waterfield) and enlists Jim to help with her search.

Bono, looking for his tribesmen, agrees to join the search as both trails seem to lead to the same place.

They subsequently stumble upon a crazed doctor who has been kidnapping villagers to work in a radioactive mine, where he has discovered a way of making diamonds out of mineral rocks, The group manages to stop the doctor's plan by exploding the mine. Bob and Anne agree to stay in the village to continue with improvements.

== Cast ==
- Johnny Weissmuller as Jungle Jim
- Bob Waterfield as Bob Miller
- Sheila Ryan as Anna Lawrence
- Rick Vallin as Matusa Chief Bono
- Lyle Talbot as Dr. Mitchell Heller
- Tamba as Tamba The Chimp

== Production ==
The Dinosaurs featured in the movie as are stock footage from One Million BC). Music by Mischa Bakaleinikoff

== Home media ==
Released on DVD on March 4, 2011.

== Review ==
Leonard Martin gave the movie 1.5 out of 5 stars. Variety found the movie to be typical of the genre, stating it was hokey and not aimed at adults.
