= The Houston Story =

1956 Crime Drama film

- Theatrical release poster
- Directed by: William Castle
- Written by: James B. Gordon
- Produced by: Sam Katzman
- Starring: Gene Barry; Barbara Hale; Edward Arnold
- Cinematography: Henry Freulich
- Edited by: Edwin H. Bryant
- Color process: Black and white
- Production company: Clover Productions
- Distributed by: Columbia Pictures
- Release date: February 1956
- Running time: 81 minutes
- Country: United States
- Language: English

The Houston Story is a 1956 American crime film noir directed by William Castle and starring Gene Barry, Barbara Hale and Edward Arnold. It was produced by Sam Katzman for distribution by Columbia Pictures.

== Plot ==
Frank Duncan (Barry), a shrewd oil driller from Galveston, Texas, conceives a plan to sneakily siphon millions of dollars' worth of oil from the oil fields and sell it as his own. He goes through nightclub singer Zoe Crane (Hale) to insinuate himself with a Houston mobster, Paul Atlas (Arnold) to get financing for his scheme.

Atlas tells right-hand man Gordon Shay privately that he plans to double-cross Duncan as soon as the money's in hand. Chris Barker, a gunman, robs Duncan and intends to murder him, but Duncan is able to push Barker off the observation roof of the Houston justice building to his death.

Mob boss Emile Constant sends a pair of thugs to assassinate Duncan. Duncan tries to make a getaway with the help of true-blue girlfriend Madge, but the hard-hearted Zoe steals his money and lies to Madge that Duncan has betrayed her. The thugs kill Zoe and toss her body from a moving car. Duncan shoots the thugs, but before Duncan can get away, the cops close in on him and he's forced to surrender.

== Cast ==
- Gene Barry as Frank Duncan
- Barbara Hale as Zoe Crane
- Edward Arnold as Paul Atlas
- Paul Richards as Gordon Shay
- Jeanne Cooper as Madge
- Frank Jenks as Louie Phelan
- John Zaremba as Emile Constant
- Chris Alcaide as Chris Barker
- Jack Littlefield as Willie Lucas (as Jack V. Littlefield)
- Paul Levitt as Duke
- Fred Krone as Marsh
- Pete Kellett as Kalo

== Production ==
The film went through a major casting change while in production on location in Houston. Originally set for the lead role was acclaimed character actor Lee J. Cobb. But Cobb suffered a heart attack on May 8 after filming an exhausting fight sequence, in part due to the heat in Texas, where the scene was shot. Cobb was not able to work for the three more days of location scenes on the schedule. Director William Castle, who resembled Cobb, doubled for him in these scenes. Ten weeks later Cobb had recovered enough to return to work. However he then suffered another heart attack and had to be replaced.

Cobb's part had to be recast and according to Castle, producer Sam Katzman "insisted on a relatively new actor in pictures - Gene Barry, a fine actor, but as unlike Lee J. Cobb as anyone could be."

Castle says footage of himself and Cobb remains in the final film.

The film's sets were designed by the art director Paul Palmentola.

== See also ==
- List of American films of 1956
