= How to Succeed with Sex =

1970 film by Bert I. Gordon

- Directed by: Bert I. Gordon
- Written by: Bert I. Gordon
- Produced by: Jerome F. Katzman executive Sam Katzman
- Starring: Zack Taylor Mary Jane Carpenter
- Edited by: John A. Bushelman
- Music by: Sean Bonniwell Forest Hamilton
- Production company: Argo Productions
- Distributed by: Medford Film Corp
- Release date: April 1970
- Running time: 77 minutes
- Country: USA
- Language: English

How to Succeed with Sex is an American sex comedy film written and directed by Bert I. Gordon., released on October 30, 1972.

== Plot ==
A man, who is having trouble scoring with his girlfriend, reads a book about sex and seduction to get some pointers.

== Cast ==
- Zack Taylor as Jack
- Mary Jane Carpenter as Sandy
- Bambi Allen as Joan
- Victoria Bond as Pam
- Shawn Devereaux as Phyllis
- Luanne Roberts as Peggy
- Keith London as Fred
- Margaretta Ramsey as Margaretta

== Reception ==
The New York Times praised the film's dialogue as ironic, literal and even occasionally funny" and said the women were "lovely".

Film critic Gene Siskel called it "repetitive and not erotic."

The Los Angeles Times said "over the years veteran low budget producer Sam Katzman has racked up a reputation for spotting a trend and cashing in on it, but he's awfully late in getting into nudies" adding the film was "not only too late, it offers too little for its genre."
