= Glamour Girl (1948 film) =

1947 film by Arthur Dreifuss

- Theatrical release poster
- Directed by: Arthur Dreifuss
- Written by: Lee Gold
- Produced by: Sam Katzman
- Starring: Gene Krupa
- Cinematography: Ira H. Morgan
- Edited by: Charles Nelson
- Music by: Mischa Bakaleinikoff
- Production company: Kay Pictures
- Distributed by: Columbia Pictures
- Release dates: December 24, 1947; January 16, 1948 (U.S.)
- Running time: 68 minutes
- Country: United States
- Language: English

Glamour Girl is a 1948 musical film starring Gene Krupa.

== Cast ==
- Gene Krupa
- Virginia Grey as Lorraine Royle
- Michael Duane as Johnny Evans
- Susan Reed as Jennie Higgins
- Jimmy Lloyd as Buddy Butterfield

== Production ==
The film was originally known as I Surrender Dear. The title was re-used in another film.
