= Drums of Tahiti =

1954 film by William Castle

- Directed by: William Castle
- Screenplay by: Robert E. Kent
- Story by: Robert E. Kent; Douglas Heyes
- Produced by: Sam Katzman
- Starring: Dennis O'Keefe; Patricia Medina; Francis L. Sullivan
- Narrated by: Michael Ansara
- Cinematography: Lester White
- Edited by: Jerome Thoms
- Music by: Mischa Bakaleinikoff
- Color process: Technicolor
- Production company: Columbia Pictures
- Distributed by: Columbia Pictures
- Release date: April 23, 1954
- Running time: 73 minutes
- Country: United States
- Language: English

Drums of Tahiti is a 1954 American south seas adventure film directed by William Castle and starring Dennis O'Keefe, Patricia Medina and Francis L. Sullivan. Drums of Tahiti was released in 3D, and was one of three 3D movies made by director William Castle. The film's sets were designed by the art director Paul Palmentola.

== Plot ==
In 1877, Tahitians under the rule of aging Queen Pomare (Frances Brandt) dislike their position as a French protectorate and quietly plan a new war with assistance from Britain.

== Cast ==
- Dennis O'Keefe as Mike Macklin
- Patricia Medina as Wanda Spence
- Francis L. Sullivan as Commissioner Pierre Duvois
- George Keymas as Angelo
- Sylvia Lewis as Mawaii
- Cicely Browne as Gay Knight
- Raymond Lawrence as Shoreham
- Frances Brandt as Queen Pomare (uncredited)
- Eddie Foster as Tommy (uncredited)
- Nelson Leigh as Minister (uncredited)
- Paul Newlan as Captain (uncredited)

== Production ==
Filming started 15 June 1953.
