= Docks of New York =

1945 film by Wallace Fox

- Directed by: Wallace Fox
- Written by: Harvey Gates
- Produced by: Sam Katzman; Jack Dietz
- Starring: Leo Gorcey; Billy Benedict; Huntz Hall; Gloria Pope
- Cinematography: Ira Morgan
- Edited by: William Austin
- Music by: Edward J. Kay
- Distributed by: Monogram Pictures Corporation
- Release date: February 24, 1945 (U.S.)
- Running time: 62 mins
- Country: United States

See The Docks of New York for the 1928 George Bancroft film directed by Josef von Sternberg.

Docks of New York is a 1945 American comedy film directed by Wallace Fox and starring the East Side Kids.

== Plot ==
Late one night on New York's poor East Side, a man is stabbed to death on a street corner, and his body is searched by his attacker. Nearby, Glimpy shows Muggs McGinnis a jeweled necklace he just found outside their tenement. While Glimpy and Muggs are investigating the area, the attacker spots them and gives chase, but is interrupted by the arrival of the police. Muggs and Glimpy then return to their tenement and learn from neighbor Mrs. Darcy, a war refugee from Toscania, that a thief just stole a valuable necklace from her. After she identifies the found necklace as hers and speculates that the man who attacked the boys was Compeau, an accomplice of the Toscanian Gestapo, she asks the boys to keep the heirloom until the next day. Unknown to the boys, Saundra, Mrs. Darcy's niece, is the princess of Toscania and is living in obscurity out of fear of the Gestapo.

At a mansion, Compeau, meanwhile, reports his bungled robbery to Prince Igor Mallet, Saundra's ambitious cousin. Mallet, who has convinced Toscania's recently arrived prime minister that he is a concerned supporter of the princess, has hired Compeau to kill Saundra so that he can inherit the throne, and has offered the thief the necklace, a crown jewel, as payment.

The next morning, Muggs calls the East Side Kids together for a meeting, and after they learn that Compeau's victim was a known thief, they decide to have one diamond from the necklace appraised at Kessel's pawnshop. At the same time, the penniless Saundra goes to Kessel's to pawn an imitation of the necklace, unaware that she is being followed by Compeau. When the boys arrive at the shop a few minutes later, they stumble upon Kessel's stabbed body and are arrested by the police. At the police station, Capt. Jacobs then forces Muggs to hand over the diamond, but none of the boys will reveal its source.

After Compeau and Mallet realize that the necklace from Kessel's is an imitation, Mallet sneaks into Saundra's apartment, but discovers that she and her aunt have moved out. Mallet finds a coded message left behind by Mrs. Darcy for Muggs and deduces that it is the address of their new location. Compeau, meanwhile, responds to a newspaper item about the diamond and, while convincing Capt. Jacobs that the gem is his, learns that Muggs and the gang retrieved it. After the boys are released, Compeau follows them to their clubhouse and demands the necklace at gunpoint. Glimpy takes Compeau by surprise, however, and grabs his gun and the necklace. Compeau escapes the clubhouse, but Skinny and Sam follow him to the mansion, then report his whereabouts to Muggs.

At the same time, Marty, Glimpy's Merchant Marine cousin who is in love with Saundra, unwittingly reveals to the police that he went to Kessel's just before he was found dead to buy an engagement ring, and is arrested on suspicion of murder. Mrs. Darcy then phones Muggs at the tenement and informs him of their new address, but before the gang arrives there, Mallet shows up. Saundra is alone and, not suspecting her cousin, happily invites him inside. Mallet starts to strangle Saundra, but is interrupted by the arrival of the boys.

After Mallet escapes unharmed, Saundra informs the gang that the necklace they took from Compeau is a fake. The boys pledge to retrieve the real necklace and head for the mansion, while at the police station, Saundra and Mrs. Darcy reveal their identities to Capt. Jacobs and get Marty out of jail. After Capt. Jacobs informs Saundra and Mrs. Darcy that the prime minister is in the country, the boys, who are staking out the mansion, see the women being taken inside and assume they have been kidnapped.

Muggs sends Glimpy to notify the police, then he and the others break into the house and take Compeau by surprise. Before they can claim the necklace from him, Mallet shows up, and a fight ensues. The boys soon overpower Mallet and Compeau and expose them as criminals both to the police and the prime minister. Later, Marty proposes to Saundra, and the happy couple contemplate the day when they can return to Toscania as prince and princess.

== Cast ==
=== The East Side Kids ===
- Leo Gorcey as Ethelbert 'Mugs' McGinnis
- Huntz Hall as Glimpy
- Billy Benedict as Skinny
- Buddy Gorman as Danny
- Mende Koenig as Sam
- Leo Borden as Pete (a.k.a. 'Aristotles')

=== Additional cast ===
- Gloria Pope as Saundra
- Carlyle Blackwell Jr. as Marty
- Betty Blythe as Mrs. Darcy
- Cy Kendall as Compeau
- George Meeker as Mallet
- Joy Reese as Millie
- Pierre Watkin as Capt. Jacobs
- Patsy Moran as Mrs. McGinnis
- Maurice St. Clair as Patriot
- Bernard Gorcey as Kessel
- Betty Sinclair as Woman at pawnshop
- Charles King as Coroner (uncredited)

== Production ==
The film marks Mende Koenig's first East Side Kids film, as well as Leo Borden's only East Side Kids film.
