= Two Blondes and a Redhead =

1947 film by Arthur Dreifuss

- Directed by: Arthur Dreifuss
- Screenplay by: Victor McLeod; Jameson Brewer
- Story by: Harry Sauber; Paul Rebaus
- Produced by: Sam Katzman
- Starring: Jean Porter
- Cinematography: Ira H. Morgan
- Edited by: Jerome Thoms
- Music by: George Duning; Leo Shuken
- Production company: Kay Pictures
- Distributed by: Columbia Pictures
- Release date: November 5, 1947
- Running time: 69 minutes
- Country: United States
- Language: English

Two Blondes and a Redhead is a 1947 American musical romance film directed by Arthur Dreifuss and starring Jean Porter.

== Cast ==
- Jean Porter as Catherine Abbott
- Jimmy Lloyd as Tommy Randell
- June Preisser as Patti Calhoun
- Judy Clark as Vicki Adams
- Rick Vallin as Freddie Ainsley
- Douglas Wood as Judge Abbott
- Charles Smith as Miles Bradbury

== Production ==
The film was originally known as Three Blondes and a Redhead.

Filming started April 1947.
