= A Time to Sing (film) =

1968 film by Arthur Dreifuss

- Theatrical release poster
- Directed by: Arthur Dreifuss
- Written by: Robert E. Kent; Orville H. Hampton
- Produced by: Sam Katzman
- Starring: Hank Williams Jr.
- Cinematography: John F. Warren
- Edited by: Ben Lewis
- Music by: Fred Karger
- Production company: Four Leaf Productions
- Distributed by: Metro-Goldwyn-Mayer
- Release date: August 15, 1968
- Running time: 91 minutes
- Country: United States
- Language: English

A Time to Sing is a 1968 American musical drama film directed by Arthur Dreifuss and starring Hank Williams Jr. and Shelley Fabares. The film was originally known as The Hank Williams Jr Story. It was Fabares' fourth film for MGM.

== Cast ==
- Hank Williams Jr. as Grady Dodd
- Shelley Fabares as Amy Carter
- Ed Begley as Kermit Dodd
- D'Urville Martin as Luke Harper
- Donald Woods as Vernon Carter
- Clara Ward as herself
- Harold Ayer as Dr. Cartright
- Dick Haynes as Master of Ceremonies
- Gene Gentry as Master of Ceremonies
- Liz Renay as Bar Girl (uncredited)
- Charles Robinson as Shifty Barker (uncredited)
