= White Eagle (1941 serial) =

1941 film by James W. Horne

- Theatrical release poster
- Directed by: James W. Horne
- Screenplay by: Arch Heath; Morgan Cox (as Morgan B. Cox); John Cutting; Lawrence Taylor
- Story by: Fred Myton
- Starring: Buck Jones; Raymond Hatton; Dorothy Fay
- Narrated by: Knox Manning
- Cinematography: James S. Brown Jr.
- Edited by: Dwight Caldwell; Earl Turner
- Music by: Lee Zahler
- Color process: Black and white
- Production company: Columbia Pictures
- Distributed by: Columbia Pictures
- Release date: January 31, 1941
- Running time: 290 minutes (15 episodes)
- Country: United States
- Language: English

White Eagle (1941), starring Buck Jones, is the eighth serial released by Columbia Pictures. It was based on Columbia's 1932 Buck Jones Western feature, also called White Eagle.

== Plot ==
White Eagle, a Pony Express rider, is the son of a massacred Army officer, who has been raised by an Indian tribe. He believes himself to be the son of the tribal chief and is working to get a peace treaty signed between the Indians and the white settlers. But Dandy Darnell, a slick but merciless outlaw, tries to keep the fight alive by sending his henchmen to stir up trouble. This is partly due to his wish to grab hundreds of thousands of acres (hundreds of square kilometers) in the western territories for himself and, also, to incite a war with the Indians along the territory.

== Cast ==
- Buck Jones as White Eagle
- Raymond Hatton as Grizzly
- Dorothy Fay as Janet Rand
- James Craven as Dandy Darnell
- Chief Yowlachie as Chief Running Deer
- Jack Ingram as Gregory Cantro
- Charles King as Brace - Henchman
- John Merton as Ronimo - Henchman

== Chapter titles ==
1. Flaming Teepees
2. The Jail Delivery
3. The Dive into Quicksands
4. The Warning Death Knife
5. Treachery at the Stockade
6. The Gun-Cane Murder
7. The Revealing Blotter
8. Bird-calls of Deliverance
9. The Fake Telegram
10. Mystic Dots and Dashes
11. The Ear at the Window
12. The Massacre Invitation
13. The Framed-up Showdown
14. The Fake Army General
15. Treachery Downed

_{Source:}

== Production ==
Producer Larry Darmour hired Buck Jones in May 1940 to star in a serial remake of Jones's 1932 feature. Originally scheduled to start filming in November 1940 at the Darmour studio; White Eagle had been postponed while Buck Jones recovered from a bout with influenza. He returned to work in late December.

Darmour used the 1932 White Eagle feature as both a reference print and as source material. In a few scenes Jones was costumed and made up to match his appearance in the older film, so that scenes from the feature could be used in the serial.

Director James W. Horne made serials in the silent-film days, but had spent most of his later career as a comedy director, principally with Laurel and Hardy. Larry Darmour put Horne in complete charge of the Columbia serials, and Horne freely indulged his sense of humor by encouraging his actors to play the action straight during the first three chapters -- these would sell the serial to theater owners -- and then exaggerate their portrayals later on. Buck Jones resisted the advice and gave his usual legitimate performance, but actor James Craven obeyed orders and got laughs as an easily exasperated heavy: "the cool, calculating villain transformed into a sputtering, impatient, and hilariously unhinged figure as his intricate plans were repeatedly foiled. Author Scott MacGillivray aptly described him as 'the Wile E. Coyote of serial villains: he expects his henchmen to fail.'"

== Reception ==
The serial was released on January 31, 1941. Trade publications printed the plot synopsis but didn't offer a critical review of the serial. It was left to exhibitors to pass judgment on the film. A Kansas City, Missouri showman advised, "Buck Jones once made a serial of the same name and they haven't forgotten it, so you will run into trouble. Good enough as a serial, but Columbia economized to the point where even the patrons noticed it." Melrose, New Mexico: "Nearly finished with this serial. Holding up good considering usual producer blunders in each chapter."

== Recycling ==
Footage from White Eagle was reused extensively in Columbia's very last serial -- in fact, the last Hollywood serial of them all -- Blazing the Overland Trail (1956). Most of the action scenes were lifted from 1941's White Eagle and 1940's Overland with Kit Carson. Lee Roberts is costumed to match old footage of Buck Jones, and Dennis Moore is dressed to match even older shots of Bill Elliott. New shots are noticeably cheap, with only two or three people on camera (while the old stock shots have entire ensembles).
