= Uranium Boom =

1956 film by William Castle

- Theatrical release poster
- Directed by: William Castle
- Written by: George W. George
- Produced by: Sam Katzman
- Starring: Dennis Morgan; Patricia Medina; William Talman
- Cinematography: Fred Jackman, Jr.
- Edited by: Edwin H. Bryant
- Production company: Clover Productions
- Distributed by: Columbia Pictures
- Release date: March 2, 1956
- Running time: 67 minutes
- Country: United States
- Language: English

Uranium Boom is a 1956 American adventure film directed by William Castle and starring Dennis Morgan and Patricia Medina.

== Plot ==
Becoming mining partners after first getting into a fistfight, two men strike uranium pay dirt in remote Colorado. Grady (William Talman) guards the claim while Brad (Dennis Morgan) returns to town to register their find. Unfortunately, Brad is distracted by a young beautiful woman from Denver and quickly marries her, before he realizes she has a past with his partner, who doesn't take the news well.

Vowing to ruin Brad any way he can, Grady begins by giving his half-share of the mine to Jean Williams (Patricia Medina), his former sweetheart, in an attempt to win her back. When that fails, Grady spreads a rumor that the railroad is erecting a spur near the uranium mine. The greed-driven Brad sinks all his money into preparing for the train, then ends up broke when he discovers the truth.

But when he realizes Jean won't leave Brad no matter what, Grady shrugs it off and agrees to become partners with him once again.

== Cast ==
- Dennis Morgan as Brad Collins
- Patricia Medina as Jean Williams
- William Talman as Grady Mathews
- Tina Carver as Gail Windsor
- Philip Van Zandt as Navajo Charlie
- William Henry as Joe McGinnus
- Gregg Barton as Phil McGinnus
- Mel Curtis as Phil McGinnus
- Henry Rowland as Harry
- S. John Launer as Mac
- Michael Bryant as Peterson
- Frank Wilcox as Floyd Gorman
- Ralph Sanford as Old Timer
- Carlyle Mitchell as Mr. Aldrich
- Nick Tell as Reporter

== Reception ==
The Los Angeles Times said the cast "prove themselves good troupers in the melodramatic situations."
