= Adventures of Captain Africa Mighty Jungle Avenger! =

1955 film by Spencer Gordon Bennet

Adventures of Captain Africa, Mighty Jungle Avenger!
- Original poster for the first chapter of the serial
- Directed by: Spencer G. Bennet
- Screenplay by: George H. Plympton
- Story by: George H. Plympton
- Produced by: Sam Katzman
- Starring: John Hart; Rick Vallin; Ben Welden; June Howard; Bud Osborne
- Cinematography: Ira H. Morgan A.S.C.
- Edited by: Earl Turner
- Music by: Mischa Bakaleinikoff (music conducted by)
- Color process: Black and white
- Production company: Sam Katzman Productions
- Distributed by: Columbia Pictures
- Release date: June 9, 1955
- Running time: 225 minutes (15 episodes)
- Country: United States
- Language: English

Adventures of Captain Africa is a 1955 adventure serial film directed by Spencer Gordon Bennet and starring John Hart.

== Plot ==
Trapper Nat Coleman and government agent Ted Arnold come upon a plot to take over an African nation. Its leader, Caliph Abdul el Hamid, has been exiled from his country and replaced by a look-alike usurper allied with an unnamed foreign power. The caliph intends to return but enemy agents Boris and Greg are out to stop him. Captain Africa, a masked jungle lord, appears occasionally to aid Nat and Ted.

== Cast ==
- John Hart as Captain Africa
- Rick Vallin as Ted
- Ben Welden as Omar
- June Howard as Princess Rhoda
- Bud Osborne as Nat Coleman
- Paul Marion as Hamid
- Lee Roberts as Boris
- Terry Frost as Greg

== Production ==
Adventures of Captain Africa was originally announced in August 1954, with its title soon changed to Outlaws of the Desert, and back again to the Captain Africa title. This was a sequel to The Phantom (starring Tom Tyler). The serial's storyline incorporated action scenes from the 1943 Phantom serial, the 1944 Gilbert Roland serial The Desert Hawk, and the 1937 Frank Buck serial Jungle Menace.

Well into production, Columbia found that its screen rights to the Phantom comic strip had expired. King Features wanted more money than producer Sam Katzman was willing to spend, and negotiations broke down. Katzman finished the new serial anyway, assuming that Columbia and King Features would come to terms.

When they didn't, Katzman had to remove all references to the Phantom character, including the costume. Katzman called John Hart back to appear in a week's worth of new scenes, avoiding any mention or depiction of the Phantom. Hart was now wearing an amended costume that only used part of the original Phantom outfit, with the addition of a leather aviator's cap and riding breeches. The revised story established Hart as a new hero, Captain Africa, who still bears a strong resemblance to the Phantom in both appearance and behavior.

Serial producers often economized by including a "cheater" chapter, in which flashbacks to earlier chapters are shown instead of new scenes. This serial uses an unprecedented four cheaters among its 15 chapters. The frequent recaps were necessitated by the hasty rewrites during production, and to compensate for the removal of footage from The Phantom. Each of the 15 chapters has only a few minutes of new material.

== Release ==
The rushed patchwork was finally released in June 1955. The troubled production -- and the overspending to salvage it -- compelled Columbia's New York office, which controlled what films the studio produced, to instruct Sam Katzman to stop making serials. When exhibitors protested, Katzman made two more new serials to satisfy the demand, before discontinuing new serial production permanently.

Columbia reissued Adventures of Captain Africa to theaters in April 1965. The serial was released on VHS videotape and on DVD by private labels catering to serial collectors; the film has yet to see a licensed video release.

== Critical reception ==
So few serials were being released in the mid-1950s that most trade publications no longer bothered to review them. The Exhibitor did screen the first chapter of Adventures of Captain Africa, rating it "fair." Apart from a synopsis of the plot, the review summed up the serial in a single sentence: "There is sufficient action and excitement here for serial requirements."

Serial historian William C. Cline writes that Adventures of Captain Africa is "an obvious remake of The Phantom, it contained many stock shots from the earlier release and at times seemed almost like a repeat run."

== Chapter titles ==
1. Mystery Man of the Jungle!
2. Captain Africa to the Rescue!
3. Midnight Attack!
4. Into the Crocodile Pit!
5. Jungle War Drums!
6. Slave Traders!
7. Saved by Captain Africa!
8. The Bridge in the Sky! -- Recap Chapter
9. Blasted by Captain Africa! -- Recap Chapter
10. The Vanishing Princess!
11. The Tunnel of Terror! -- Recap Chapter
12. Fangs of the Beast!
13. Renegades at Bay! -- Recap Chapter
14. Captain Africa and the Wolf Dog!
15. Captain Africa's Final Move!

== See also ==
- List of American films of 1955
