= Blake of Scotland Yard (1937 film) =

1937 American film directed by Robert F. Hill

- Film poster
- Directed by: Robert F. Hill
- Written by: William Buchanan (screenplay); Basil Dickey (screenplay); Robert F. Hill (story)
- Produced by: Sam Katzman
- Starring: See below
- Cinematography: William Hyer
- Edited by: Frederick Bain; Holbrook N. Todd
- Distributed by: Victory Pictures
- Release date: January 30, 1937
- Running time: 73 minutes (film); 303 minutes (serial)
- Country: United States
- Language: English

Blake of Scotland Yard is a 1937 Victory Pictures American film serial directed by Robert F. Hill. The serial was also edited down into a feature film version.

== Plot ==
Sir James Blake, a leading figure in crime fighting, has retired from Scotland Yard in order to assist his niece Hope and her friend Jerry in developing an apparatus they have invented. Sir James believes that their invention has the potential to prevent wars, and plans to donate it to the League of Nations. However, a gang of criminals led by the elusive "Scorpion" steals the device, and Blake and his associates must recover the invention and determine the true identity of the "Scorpion".

== Cast ==
- Ralph Byrd as Jerry Sheehan
- Herbert Rawlinson as Sir James Blake
- Joan Barclay as Hope Mason
- Lloyd Hughes as Dr. Marshall
- Dickie Jones as Bobby Mason
- Lucille Lund as The Duchess, a Gang Moll
- Nick Stuart as Julot, Male Apache Dancer
- Sam Flint as Chief Inspector Henderson
- Gail Newbury as Mimi, policewoman posing as dancer
- Jimmy Aubrey as Baron Polinka
- Theodore Lorch as Daggett, the butler
- George DeNormand as Gang Member posing as Newshawker
- Bob Terry as Peyton, lead thug
- William Farrel as Count Basil Zagaloff
- Frank Wayne as Charles
- Dick Curtis as Nicky, a Gang Member
