= The Fighting Coward (1935 film) =

1935 film

- Directed by: Dan Milner
- Written by: Peter B. Kyne
- Produced by: Sam Katzman
- Starring: Ray Walker
- Distributed by: Victory Pictures
- Release date: December 15, 1935
- Running time: 60 minutes
- Country: United States
- Language: English

The Fighting Coward is a 1935 American crime film directed by Dan Milner.

== Cast ==
- Ray Walker as Bob Horton
- Joan Woodbury as Marie Russell
- William Farnum as Jim Horton
- Earl Dwire as Police Chief John Russell
- Syd Saylor as Detective Hendricks
- Matthew Betz as Krane (as Mathew Betz)
- Clara Kimball Young as Mrs. Gordon
