= Blackjack Ketchum, Desperado =

1956 film by Earl Bellamy

- Theatrical release poster
- Directed by: Earl Bellamy
- Screenplay by: Luci Ward; Jack Natteford; Luci Ward
- Based on: novel by Louis L'Amour
- Produced by: Sam Katzman
- Starring: Howard Duff; Victor Jory
- Cinematography: Fred Jackman, Jr.
- Edited by: Saul A. Goodkind
- Color process: Black and white
- Production company: Sam Katzman Productions
- Distributed by: Columbia Pictures
- Release date: April 1, 1956
- Running time: 76 minutes
- Country: United States
- Language: English

Blackjack Ketchum, Desperado is a 1956 American Western film directed by Earl Bellamy and starring Howard Duff and Victor Jory. It was based on the novel Kilkenny by Louis L'Amour.

== Plot ==
When a friend in New Mexico is about to be shot, Tom Ketchum draws his gun and kills the brother of Jared Tetlow, a wealthy cattleman. Tom goes to a ranch run by Nita Riordan and her father, where a relationship begins and marriage is discussed.

Tetlow returns, learns from Laurie Webster about the shooting and vows to get vengeance against the man who killed his brother. A cattle war begins as well, but law and order prevails and Tom decides to stay and settle down.

== Cast ==
- Howard Duff as Tom "Blackjack" Ketchum
- Victor Jory as Jared Tetlow
- Margaret Field as Nita Riordan (as Maggie Mahoney)
- Angela Stevens as Laurie Webster
- David Orrick McDearmon as Bob Early (as David Orrick)
- William Tannen as Dee Havalik
- Ken Christy as Sheriff Macy
- Martin Garralaga as Jaime Brigo
- Robert Roark as Ben Tetlow
- Don Harvey as Mac Gill (as Don C. Harvey)
- Pat O'Malley as Doc Blaine
- Jack Littlefield as Burl Tetlow
- Sidney Mason as Matt Riordan
