= Miami Exposé =

1956 film by Fred F. Sears

- Theatrical release poster
- Directed by: Fred F. Sears
- Screenplay by: Robert E. Kent
- Story by: Sam Katzman
- Produced by: Sam Katzman
- Starring: Lee J. Cobb; Patricia Medina; Edward Arnold
- Cinematography: Benjamin H. Kline
- Edited by: Al Clark
- Production company: Clover Productions
- Distributed by: Columbia Pictures
- Release date: September 1956
- Running time: 75 minutes
- Country: United States
- Language: English

Miami Exposé is a 1956 American film noir directed by Fred F. Sears and starring Lee J. Cobb, Patricia Medina and Edward Arnold. The film marked the last performance of Arnold, who was fatally stricken during the production. Also in the film is a brief appearance by boxing great Jake "The Raging Bull" LaMotta, playing a thug during the Everglades chase scene.

== Plot ==
Miami police lieutenant Bart Scott informs his captain of his plans to retire. His fiancée, Ann Easton, a widow whose husband was killed in the line of duty, refuses to marry Bart until he quits the force.

The captain is murdered by a gunman who also is found dead. The gunman's wife, Lila Hodges, witnesses the crime. She becomes of grave concern to many in Miami with criminal ties, including attorney Raymond Sheridan, who is offering lobbyist Oliver Tubbs a million-dollar bribe to get Miami gambling legalized, and gangster Louis Ascot, who offers Lila sanctuary and takes her to Cuba.

Scott manages to get to Lila and persuade her to return to Miami to testify. When she expresses reluctance to do so, he parades her in public, where thugs attempt to kill her. Convinced that she has to help, Lila is taken to Scott's home in the Everglades to remain in hiding until the trial, but when Ascot comes after her, Lila and Ann end up armed and trying to hold off the gunmen until Scott can arrive with reinforcements. Sheridan, meanwhile, after double-crossing Tubbs, is killed by him.

== Cast ==
- Lee J. Cobb as Lt. Barton 'Bart' Scott
- Patricia Medina as Lila Hodges
- Edward Arnold as Oliver Tubbs
- Michael Granger as Louis Ascot
- Eleanore Tanin as Ann Easton
- Alan Napier as Raymond Sheridan
- Harry Lauter as Det. Tim Grogan
- Chris Alcaide as Morrie Pell
- Hugh Sanders as Chief Charles Landon
- Barry L. Connors as Stevie Easton
