= Revenue Agent =

1950 film by Lew Landers

- Directed by: Lew Landers
- Screenplay by: William Sackheim (Written for the Screen by); Arthur A. Ross (Written for the Screen by)
- Produced by: Sam Katzman
- Starring: Douglas Kennedy; Jean Willes; Onslow Stevens
- Cinematography: Ira H. Morgan
- Edited by: Edwin H. Bryant
- Color process: Black and white
- Production company: Columbia Pictures
- Distributed by: Columbia Pictures
- Release date: 1950
- Running time: 72 minutes
- Country: United States
- Language: English

Revenue Agent is a 1950 American film noir crime film directed by Lew Landers and starring Douglas Kennedy, Jean Willes and Onslow Stevens.

== Plot ==
An accountant's wife is having an affair with his boss. In retribution, the husband calls the Internal Revenue Service to expose a large tax-evasion racket to smuggle gold bullion from Mexico.

== Cast ==
- Douglas Kennedy as Steve Daniels aka Steve Adams
- Jean Willes as Marge King
- Onslow Stevens as Sam Bellows
- William 'Bill' Phillips as Harry Reardon
- Ray Walker as Lt. Bob Ullman
- David Bruce as Cliff Gage
- Archie Twitchell as Ernie Medford

== See also ==
- List of American films of 1950
