= A Yank in Korea =

1951 film by Lew Landers

- Directed by: Lew Landers
- Screenplay by: William Sackheim
- Story by: Leo Lieberman
- Produced by: Sam Katzman
- Starring: Lon McCallister
- Cinematography: William P. Whitley
- Edited by: Edwin H. Bryant
- Production company: Columbia Pictures
- Distributed by: Columbia Pictures
- Release date: February 14, 1951
- Running time: 73 minutes
- Country: United States
- Language: English

A Yank in Korea is a 1951 American war film directed by Lew Landers and starring Lon McCallister. It is one of the first films produced about the Korean War.

== Plot ==
A tough sergeant has to teach a hotshot young soldier how to be a team player.

== Cast ==
- Lon McCallister as Andy Smith
- William 'Bill' Phillips as Sgt. Kirby
- Brett King as Milo Pagano
- Larry Stewart as Sollie Kaplan
- William Tannen as L.t. Lewis
- Tommy Farrell as Jinx Hamition
- Norman Wayne as Stan Howser
- Rusty Wescoatt as Sgt. Hutton
- William Haade as Cpl. Jawolski
- Ralph Hodges as Randy Smith
