= Lee Roberts (actor) =

American actor (1913–1989)

- Born: Robert R. Allen; June 17, 1913; Ohio, U.S.
- Died: April 24, 1989 (aged 75); San Joaquin, California, U.S.
- Years active: 1943–1961
- Spouse: Evelyn Finley

Lee Roberts (June 17, 1913 – April 24, 1989) was an American film actor during the Hollywood Golden Age. Sometimes he is credited as Robert Allen or Lee J. Roberts.

== Career ==
Little is known about this man who appeared in over 100 films between 1943 and 1959, according to the Internet Movie Database. Roberts, whose career of portraying good guys and bad guys spanned virtually the entire range of Columbia and Republic serials production, delighted serial fans as the classic action heavy, but he could play sympathetic roles with equal skills as a sheriff or a police detective. Then, after the westerns and serials faded he migrated to television work, appearing in a significant number of popular TV shows.

== Selected appearances ==
=== Films ===
- Wild West (1946)
- The Law Comes to Gunsight (1947)
- Wild Country (1947)
- Lady at Midnight (1948)
- Mark of the Lash (1948)
- Deadline (1948)
- South of Death Valley (1949)
- Battling Marshal (1950)
- Lawless Cowboys (1951)
- The Longhorn (1951)
- Kansas Territory (1952)
- The Spoilers (1955)
- The Spirit of St. Louis (1957)
- Gunfight at the O.K. Corral (1957)
- Missile to the Moon (1958)

=== Serials ===
- The Masked Marvel (1943)
- The Scarlet Horseman (1946)
- Batman and Robin (1949)
- Pirates of the High Seas (1950)
- Desperadoes of the West (1950)
- Desperadoes of the West (1950)
- Captain Video: Master of the Stratosphere (1951)
- King of the Congo (1952)
- The Great Adventures of Captain Kidd (1953)
- The Lost Planet (1953)
- Gunfighters of the Northwest (1954)
- Riding with Buffalo Bill (1954)
- The Adventures of Captain Africa (1955)
- King of the Carnival (1955)
- Perils of the Wilderness (1956)
- Blazing the Overland Trail (1956)

=== TV shows ===
- The Lone Ranger (1949–1956) – Stage Driver / Stage Guard / Sheriff Casey / Sheriff Mason / Messenger / Deputy Alex Creel
- The Cisco Kid (1950–1954) – Jim / Henchman Augie / Link Barton / Assayer / Lacey / Henchman Matt Collins / Olson
- The Adventures of Kit Carson (1952) – Deputy Morgan / Henchman / Henchman Jess
- The Roy Rogers Show (1952) – Deputy Phil / John Medford
- Hopalong Cassidy (1952–1954) – Leeds – Henchman / Dillon
- Topper (1954) – Martin
- Letter to Loretta (1954) – Court Attendant
- Dragnet (1955)
- Commando Cody: Sky Marshal of the Universe (1955) – Orton / Alien Crewman
- The Adventures of Rin Tin Tin (1955–1958) – Sgt. Spike Duffy / Aaron Depew / Al Cross / Travis
- The Gabby Hayes Show (1956)
- Tombstone Territory (1957–1959) – Eric Erickson / Howie
- Casey Jones (1957) – Sergeant McGinnis
- Perry Mason (1958) – Detective Ron Jacks
- Broken Arrow (1958) – Major Spillman
- Frontier Doctor (1958) – Cowboy
- The Rough Riders (1958–1959)
- Mackenzie's Raiders (1959) – Rancher / Assassin
- Man with a Camera (1959) – Officer
