= Sam Katzman =

American film producer and director (1901–1973)

- Born: July 7, 1901; New York City
- Died: August 4, 1973 (aged 72); Hollywood
- Occupations: Film producer and director
- Years active: 1933–1973

Sam Katzman (July 7, 1901 – August 4, 1973) was an American film producer and director. Katzman's specialty was producing low-budget genre films, including serials, which had disproportionately high returns for the studios and his financial backers. In the 1930s, he produced numerous Western films for Victory Pictures and Puritan Pictures, and in the 1940s, he produced 22 East Side Kids features for Monogram Pictures. As well as producing the Jungle Jim series, in the 1950s, Katzman and his studio Clover Productions made science fiction, horror, and teen films for Columbia Pictures, including Creature with the Atom Brain (1955), Rock Around the Clock, Earth vs. the Flying Saucers, The Werewolf (all 1956), and The Giant Claw (1957). Katzman also produced two musicals starring Elvis Presley for Metro-Goldwyn-Mayer (MGM): Kissin' Cousins (1964) and Harum Scarum (1965).

== Early career ==
Sam was born to a Jewish family; his father Abe Katzman was a violinist. He and Sam's mother Rebecca (née Sugarman) were from Kishinev, Bessarabia Governorate, Russian Empire (now Chisinău, Moldova). Katzman went to work as a stage laborer at the age of 13 in the fledgling East Coast film industry and moved from prop boy to assistant director at Fox Films. He would learn all aspects of filmmaking and was a Hollywood producer for more than 40 years. Katzman worked as an assistant to Norman Taurog and got married on the set of The Diplomats in 1928 at Fox.

In October 1927 he signed with comic Joe Russo to make a series of two-reel comedies.

=== Screencraft Pictures ===
Katzman was a production supervisor at Showmen's Pictures in the early 1930s, and Screencraft Productions in July 1935.

His movies included His Private Secretary (Showmen's, 1933) starring a young John Wayne (made for $9,000 and earned $95,000). They also made Police Call (1933), Ship of Wanted Men (1933), Public Stenographer (1933), and St. Louis Woman (1934).

=== Supreme Pictures ===
He worked as a producer at A. W. Hackel's Supreme Pictures, where he mostly made Westerns starring Bob Steele. Filming started 15 May 1934 with A Demon for Trouble (1934).

Other films included Western Justice (1934), The Brand of Hate (1934), Smokey Smith (1935), Tombstone Terror (1935), Trail of Terror (1935), Alias John Law (1935), Big Calibre (1935), Sundown Saunders (1935), Brand of the Outlaws (1936) and The Kid Ranger (1936).

=== Victory Pictures and Puritan Pictures ===
In June 1935 Katzman announced he would make six films written by Peter Kyne for Fox, starting with Danger Ahead. He ended up taking over Bryan Foy's studios at Culver City and doing the films through his own company, Victory Pictures.

In 1935 Katzman founded Puritan Pictures, a film distribution group, their first film being Suicide Squad (1935).

From 1935 to 1940 Victory produced two serials and 30 features, including Western film series starring Tom Tyler and Tim McCoy, and action pictures with Herman Brix and Bela Lugosi. Katzman also made crime films like Hot Off the Press (1935), Bars of Hate (1935), The Fighting Coward (1935) and Danger Ahead (1935), many of which were written by Peter B. Kyne.

Katzman entered the world of serials in 1936 (with Shadow of Chinatown (1936) starring Bela Lugosi) and would return to the genre in 1944.

In June 1937 a fire damaged the building where Victory was based. In January 1939 Victory announced they would make 20 more Westerns., but within six months Katzman closed Puritan and began releasing his productions through Monogram Pictures.

== Monogram Pictures ==
At Monogram, a "budget" studio, Katzman partnered with Jack Dietz, under the name Banner Productions, to produce 22 East Side Kids features, two musicals, and a series of thrillers with Bela Lugosi. In April 1941 Katzman signed Lugosi to make three films, which were well received. Lugosi ultimately made nine films for Katzman.

In January 1943 Katzman signed a contract with stage star Frank Fay and screen comic Billy Gilbert for four films. Fay walked out on the series after the first film, Spotlight Scandals (1943), and Katzman replaced him with Gilbert's closest friend, Shemp Howard.

Katzman continued to produce features for Monogram through 1948. His final East Side Kids movies were Docks of New York (1945), Mr. Muggs Rides Again (1945) and Come Out Fighting (1945). The series came to an abrupt end when its star Leo Gorcey wanted double the usual salary from Katzman. Katzman reacted by pulling the plug on the series. (Gorcey stayed with Monogram, which retooled the series as The Bowery Boys.)

In November 1945 Katzman replaced the rowdy East Side Kids with The Teen Agers, a wholesome gang of high-schoolers. These were vehicles for singer Freddie Stewart. It was an early example of Katzman's output aimed specifically at a teenage audience. He produced six of these musical comedies through 1948.

== Columbia Pictures ==
In September 1944 Katzman was offered a job producing serials for Columbia Pictures, starting with Brenda Starr, Reporter (1945) and Who's Guilty? (1945). With typical thrift, he produced these on the side, using Monogram's actors and technicians. The Columbia serials proved successful, and Katzman became their permanent producer, using Columbia's own technicians and facilities.

In June 1946 Katzman announced he would make his first feature for Columbia, a remake of The Last of the Mohicans starring Jon Hall. However, the first movies he ended up making at the studio were musicals. In August 1946 he signed Jean Porter to star in Betty Co-Ed (1946), made by Katzman's Monogram director Arthur Dreifuss. The film received excellent reviews, prompting Columbia to ask for three more. Porter left Metro-Goldwyn-Mayer, which was downsizing, to sign with Katzman. The three musicals were Little Miss Broadway (1947), Sweet Genevieve (1947) and Two Blondes and a Redhead (1947).

Katzman and Dreifuss then made two films with singer Gloria Jean, who had been a star at Universal Pictures. Katzman was so pleased by I Surrender Dear (1948) that he devoted more time to it, and economized on her other picture, Manhattan Angel (1949). The budgets averaged out to about $140,000 per film.

Katzman's other Columbia musicals were Mary Lou (1948) and Glamour Girl (1948). He made two sports-themed features starring Gloria Henry: Racing Luck (1948) and Triple Threat (1948). During this time Katzman continued to produce serials: Jack Armstrong (1947), The Vigilante (1947), The Sea Hound (1947) with Buster Crabbe, Brick Bradford (1948), Congo Bill (1948) and the outstandingly successful Superman (1948).

=== Focus on action pictures ===
The boxoffice performance of Katzman's action movies and serials, particularly Superman, was outstripping those for his musicals and comedies, leading him away from those genres. From 1949 to 1954 he would produce only action fare for Columbia. In October 1948 Katzman signed a seven-year, $4 million contract with Columbia to make four feature films a year through his Kay Pictures corporation, four serials a year via his Esskay Productions, and a Jungle Jim series starring Johnny Weissmuller. The budgets for the Weissmuller films were announced at $350,000 per film.

Katzman's stock-in-trade was now a mix of Arabian Nights fantasies (which he called "tits and sand"), western, action, and prison pictures. He would average ten features a year, producing them in four to ten weeks. Katzman allowed a budget of $400,000 for The Prince of Thieves (1948), a version of the Robin Hood story starring Hall. Other action-oriented Katzman product around this time included the Jungle Jim adventures; the serials Tex Granger (1948), Adventures of Sir Galahad (1949), Batman and Robin (1949), and Bruce Gentry – Daredevil of the Skies (1949); the action thriller The Mutineers (1949) with Hall; the swashbuckler Barbary Pirate (1949); and the crime movie Chinatown at Midnight (1949).

=== Method of working ===
Charles Schneer, who worked for Sam Katzman in the 1940s and 1950s, said the producer "knew everything there was to know about making a movie. He was a very enterprising fellow, and was enormously intuitive. But, he was a very tough taskmaster and a real skinflint. I managed to get along well with Sam, because I knew what he was and respected what he did. Unfortunately, all his input was negative. He never contributed anything positive. I would suggest an idea, and he would knock it down. I would argue with him, but I never got very far. He wouldn't say: 'Do this instead of that.' He would only say: 'Don't do this' — and I didn't. I certainly learned the value of a dollar from Sam."

Katzman's Monogram cameraman Richard Cline later recalled, "We did 106 features in six years, working six days a week – an average of 20 to 22 features a year. Those were "B" pictures... There was a clever writer in the unit. Sam would pick up a newspaper and say, 'Oh, here's a story.' He'd give it to the writer and the writer would turn out a script. We'd go all over. We were actually a traveling unit, a very cohesive unit, and I really learned my trade from that experience."

Katzman shrewdly planned each production with both eyes on the budget, so that he would be spending less and less money as filming progressed. He would film crowd scenes first, then dismiss many of the actors. The remaining featured players would perform their scenes, and then leave. Finally, only the two or three leading actors were still on the payroll, working with a few recognizable, economical bit players.

Katzman's main directors during his early years at Columbia were Arthur Dreifuss, Lew Landers, William Berke, and Spencer Gordon Bennet. Berke specialized in the Jungle Jim films: Mark of the Gorilla (1950), Pygmy Island (1950), Captive Girl (1951) and Fury of the Congo (1951). Bennet made the serials: Pirates of the High Seas (1950), Atom Man vs. Superman (1950), Cody of the Pony Express (1950), Mysterious Island (1951), Roar of the Iron Horse (1951) and Son of Geronimo (1952). Landers handled the other action features like State Penitentiary (1950), Revenue Agent (1950) with Lyle Talbot, Last of the Buccaneers (1950) with Paul Henreid, Chain Gang (1950), Tyrant of the Sea (1950) with Ron Randell, Hurricane Island (1951) and When the Redskins Rode (1951) with Hall, A Yank in Korea (1951) with Lon McAllister. Richard Quine, then under contract to Columbia, made one of his first films as director for Katzman, Purple Heart Diary (1951); he later did Siren of Bagdad (1953) with Paul Henreid.

Lew Landers took over direction of Jungle Jim movies for Jungle Manhunt (1951) and Jungle Jim in the Forbidden Land (1952), and did California Conquest (1952) with Cornel Wilde. Fred F. Sears, formerly an actor in Columbia features, began directing Columbia's Charles Starrett westerns; when that series lapsed, he started work for Katzman with Last Train from Bombay (1952) starring Hall. Wallace Grissell directed A Yank in Indo-China (1952) and Sidney Salkow directed The Golden Hawk (1952) with Sterling Hayden and The Pathfinder (1952) with George Montgomery.

Columbia's president Harry Cohn sometimes used the Sam Katzman unit as a threat, to keep recalcitrant actors in line or terminate an unwanted contract. Columbia owed Lucille Ball one feature assignment and an $85,000 salary, which Cohn tried to sidestep by sending Ball a "tits and sand" script from the Katzman unit. Cohn was confident that Ball would refuse the Katzman assignment, thus breaking her contract. Ball bristled at the script but didn't want to lose the salary, so she told Cohn she loved the script and agreed to the assignment. Cohn was forced to honor the agreement, and to his credit he allowed a higher production budget for The Magic Carpet (1951), which was filmed in Super Cinecolor.

Director Spencer Bennet continued to make serials like Blackhawk (1952) and King of the Congo (1952), and branched into features such as Brave Warrior (1952) with Hall and a Jungle Jim film, Voodoo Tiger (1952). (In February 1952 Katzman renewed his options to make more Weissmuller movies.) Paul Henreid returned to Katzman to star in Thief of Damascus (1952), directed by Will Jason.

=== New contract ===
In July 1952 Katzman announced he would make at least 15 films a year for seven years. In November 1952 this contract was amended so Katzman would make twenty films (seventeen features and three serials).

William Castle joined the Katzman group as director in 1953, starting with Serpent of the Nile (1953) with Rhonda Fleming and Raymond Burr. Castle later wrote in his memoirs that Katzman "was a smallish man with a round cherubic face and twinkling eyes. Few people in the motion picture industry took him seriously as a producer of quality films, but to me, Sam was a great showman." Castle went on to make a series of films for Katzman including Slaves of Babylon (1953) with Richard Conte, Conquest of Cochise (1953) with John Hodiak, and two Westerns with Montgomery, Fort Ti (1953) and Masterson of Kansas (1954), The Law vs. Billy the Kid (1954) with Scott Brady, and The Saracen Blade (1954) with Ricardo Montalbán.

Richard L. Bare directed Prisoners of the Casbah (1953) with Gloria Grahame. William Berke returned to the Jungle Jim franchise with Valley of the Head Hunters (1953). Sidney Salkow made Jack McCall, Desperado (1953) with Montgomery and Prince of Pirates (1954) with John Derek. Spencer Bennet directed the Jungle Jim films Savage Mutiny (1953) and Killer Ape (1953). Fred Sears directed Target Hong Kong (1953) with Richard Denning, Sky Commando (1953) with Dan Duryea, The 49th Man (1953) with John Ireland and Denning, and Mission Over Korea (1953) with Hodiak and Derek. Former assistant director Seymour Friedman made Flame of Calcutta (1953).

Katzman continued to produce serials during that season: The Great Adventures of Captain Kidd (1953), The Lost Planet (1953), and Gunfighters of the Northwest (1954).

Lee Sholem directed Jungle Man-Eaters (1954), which was the last official Jungle Jim movie. Rather than renewing the license and paying the fees for the Jungle Jim character, Katzman simply ignored the Jungle Jim trade name and made three more adventures with Johnny Weissmuller, now playing himself. The Weissmuller series finally ended with Devil Goddess (1955).

In July 1954 it was announced that Katzman's company, now called Clover Productions, would make 15 films for Columbia. Castle directed Jesse James vs. the Daltons (1954) in 3-D, The Iron Glove (1954) with Robert Stack, Charge of the Lancers (1954) with Paulette Goddard, Drums of Tahiti (1954) with Dennis O'Keefe and The Battle of Rogue River (1954) with Montgomery. Fred Sears had a solid hit with The Miami Story (1954).

=== Twilight of the serials ===
By the 1950s television was making inroads into the action market. In late 1953 Sam Katzman announced that he was canceling serial production, only to reconsider after a host of exhibitors deluged Katzman with letters of protest. This was front-page news in Variety. Katzman, who had already written off the serials from his budgetary plans, now had to fit them back in, squeezing the time and money tighter than ever. Instead of making more new productions from scratch, he turned to Columbia's film library and manufactured each new serial by cutting up and combining two old ones. Most of the action scenes were lifted from the old films, with new leading men wearing the same costumes to match the old scenes. Katzman slashed the budgets and production schedules to all-time lows, filming only a few new scripted scenes to tie the old footage together.

First of the remakes was Riding with Buffalo Bill (1954), borrowing key scenes from Deadwood Dick (1940) and The Valley of Vanishing Men (1942). Next came Adventures of Captain Africa, changed to Outlaws of the Desert and back again to the Captain Africa title. This was an update of the 1943 serial The Phantom with Tom Tyler, incorporating additional footage from the 1944 serial The Desert Hawk and the 1937 Frank Buck serial Jungle Menace. John Hart wore the Phantom costume in the new scenes. The serial was well into production when Katzman learned that Columbia no longer held the screen rights to the Phantom character. He finished the serial anyway, assuming that Columbia and the rights holder, King Features, would come to terms. When they didn't, Katzman was forced to scrap the old and new Phantom footage, and had to shoot new scenes with Hart in an amended costume as the new hero "Captain Africa". The rushed patchwork was released as Adventures of Captain Africa (1955).

The troubled production and the overspending on Captain Africa compelled Columbia's New York office -- which controlled what the studio produced -- to instruct Sam Katzman to stop making serials after the Captain Africa project was completed. Once again, exhibitors had the last word. Variety, in a 1955 item titled "Serials Still Alive", reported, "Exhibs, learning of producer's plans to do away with chapter plays, beefed and Katzman heeded their pleas." Columbia now asked for three new serials for the 1955–56 season, instead of the usual two. Katzman complied grudgingly and unenthusiastically, because he made only two more serials (not three), and they were even weaker than the recent chapter plays. Perils of the Wilderness (filmed in June 1955, released in January 1956) consisted mostly of chunks from Perils of the Royal Mounted (1942) and The Mysterious Pilot (1937); and Blazing the Overland Trail (1956) was a mashup of White Eagle (1941) and Overland with Kit Carson (1940), with Lee Roberts and Dennis Moore costumed to match Buck Jones and Bill Elliott, respectively. The action in these last two cliffhangers was so threadbare that the new scenes showed the heroes watching the big action scenes and discussing them, instead of actually participating in them.

Sam Katzman finally discontinued serial production at the end of 1955, and Columbia serviced the demand for serials by reissuing older titles at the rate of three per year. Columbia kept its serials in circulation through 1966.

=== New emphasis on teen movies ===
By the mid-1950s Sam Katzman decided to focus on films that would appeal to the 15-25 age group, which meant more science-fiction, horror, and rock-'n'-roll musicals.

In August 1954 Katzman said he had 14 films lined up, with four more to come, and had assigned four writers to projects: Curt Siodmak to The Creature with the Atom Brain, Berne Giler on Dressed to Kill, Ray Buffum on a juvenile delinquency story, and Robert E. Kent on a Western.

Creature with the Atom Brain (1955) led to a series of science fiction films, such as It Came from Beneath the Sea (1955), with effects from Ray Harryhausen. That was produced by Charles H. Schneer who had worked with Katzman for a number of years; Schneer and Harryhausen went on to make Earth vs. the Flying Saucers (1956) for Katzman before Schneer left to form his own unit at Columbia.

Katzman still made westerns such as The Gun That Won the West (1955), Seminole Uprising (1955), Blackjack Ketchum, Desperado (1955) and Duel on the Mississippi (1955), swashbucklers like Pirates of Tripoli (1955) and crime films such as New Orleans Uncensored (1955), Chicago Syndicate (1955), The Crooked Web (1955), The Houston Story (1956), Miami Exposé (1956) and Inside Detroit (1956). He also did the occasional thriller like Uranium Boom (1956).

His work had an increasing focus on teens, however. Teen-Age Crime Wave (1955) and Rumble on the Docks (1956) were teen-oriented crime films. He also started making musicals again with rockabilly music.

In 1955, when Columbia wanted to release the first rock-'n'-roll musical, Katzman reworked elements from his Gloria Jean musical I Surrender Dear into one of Columbia's biggest hits, Rock Around the Clock (1956) with Bill Haley and His Comets. This production cost $300,000 and earned over $4 million. This was followed by Cha-Cha-Cha Boom! (1956), Don't Knock the Rock (1957, again with Bill Haley), Calypso Heat Wave (1957) and Juke Box Rhythm (1959, scheduled for Bill Haley but ultimately made with singer Jack Jones).

Katzman also produced horror films for the teenage audience, including The Werewolf (1956), The Man Who Turned to Stone (1957), The Giant Claw (1957), Zombies of Mora Tau (1957) and The Night the World Exploded (1957).

In May 1957 Katzman told Variety: "A picture that makes money is a good picture—whether it is artistically good or bad. I’m in the five-and-dime business and not in the Tiffany business. I make pictures for the little theatres around the country." He added that his movies were normally budgeted between $250,000 and $500,000. He said at Columbia he had made 110 pictures, none of which lost money, and the average gross was $1 million. He said at least 40% of the 110 pictures made were still in release.

"Every picture I make now has a selling gimmick aimed at the young audience", he said in 1957, and he made car movies, horror stories, science fiction and music. He said his pictures are the "bread and butter" pictures of the industry. "I don't get ulcers with the type of pictures I make", he said.

In 1957 Katzman made seven films for Columbia, including non-teenage fare such as Utah Blaine (1957), Escape from San Quentin (1957), The Tijuana Story (1957) and The World Was His Jury (1957). He announced in December of that year he would double this amount over the following twelve months.

Katzman's later films at Columbia included such teen melodramas as Going Steady (1958) and Life Begins at 17 (1958); Crash Landing (1958), a disaster film based on Pan Am Flight 6; a pair of war films starring Van Johnson shot in Europe, The Last Blitzkrieg (1959) and The Enemy General (1960); and a drama about trapeze artists, The Flying Fontaines (1959).

== Later career ==
=== 20th Century-Fox ===
Katzman signed a deal with 20th Century-Fox starting with The Wizard of Baghdad (1960), an "Eastern" with Dick Shawn. He did this under a verbal agreement with Buddy Adler. In September 1960, Robert Goldstein signed him to a three-picture contract with Fox. These were to be Gentlemen Pirates written by Mel Levy, a film about Mississippi gamblers written by Jesse Lasky Jr. and Pat Silver, and Cypress Gardens by Lou Morheim. He said at the time that Hollywood was making too many blockbusters and "the motion picture business must deal in a saleable product of entertainment at a price the public can afford and not price itself out of the market."

Katzman wound up making only one more film at Fox, Pirates of Tortuga (1961), a swashbuckler similar to many of the films he made at Columbia. He sued Fox for making only two films of a four picture deal.

He returned to Columbia to make The Wild Westerners (1962), a Western, as well as two "twist" movies starring Chubby Checker, Twist Around the Clock (1961) and Don't Knock the Twist (1962). These were scene-for-scene remakes of Katzman's Bill Haley musicals, with almost identical scripts. Katzman said, "Twist Around the Clock only cost $250,000 to make, but in less than six months it grossed six million, so of course I'm gonna make more 'Twist' movies!"

=== Metro-Goldwyn-Mayer ===
Katzman accepted an offer to move his operation to Metro-Goldwyn-Mayer in 1963. He started with a low-budget musical Hootenanny Hoot (1963), which led to several more musicals: Get Yourself a College Girl (1964) and When the Boys Meet the Girls (1965) (a remake of Girl Crazy). MGM also financed three of Katzman's best-known movies: two films starring Elvis Presley, Kissin' Cousins (1964) and Harum Scarum (1965), as well as Your Cheatin' Heart (1964), a biopic of Hank Williams starring George Hamilton. Hamilton later wrote in his memoirs that "Jungle Sam cracked the whip, whacked the cane, and the whole film was in the can right on time. But he gave me free rein creatively and our director (Gene Nelson) brought in something memorable, and even Sam knew it."

In December 1964 Katzman announced he would make five films that year for MGM in his third year at the studio.

Katzman made the Herman's Hermits film Hold On! (1966) and singer Roy Orbison's only film, The Fastest Guitar Alive.

In 1967 he signed a new contract with MGM to make at least two films a year. These were Hot Rods to Hell (1967), the last film for John Brahm, and Riot on Sunset Strip (1967). Katzman wound up selling the latter to AIP for release.

His last films for MGM were A Time to Sing (1967) with Hank Williams Jr. and The Young Runaways (1968).

=== Return to Columbia ===
In 1967 Columbia Pictures wanted two quick, topical films about love-ins and singles-only apartments. Sam Katzman got the call and recruited his 1940s cronies, director Arthur Dreifuss and writer Hal Collins, to make The Love-Ins and For Singles Only (both 1967).

=== Final movies ===
Katzman's final films were produced by his son Jerry. These included Angel, Angel, Down We Go (1969) for AIP, How to Succeed with Sex (1970) and The Loners (1972) for Fanfare Productions.

== Personal life ==
He was the uncle of television producer Leonard Katzman, and, in turn, the great-great-uncle of Ethan Klein of the Israeli-American YouTube comedy channel h3h3Productions.

He married film actress Hortense Petra. They married on the set of the film The Diplomats in 1928. She sued for divorce in 1955, but the two reconciled. A son, Jerome "Jerry" Katzman (April 21, 1937–August 9, 2026), graduated from UCLA Law School, and practiced law, briefly, then worked with his father, and was an early television show packager. He became president of the William Morris Agency in 1991 and, later, its vice-chair. Following his retirement from the agency, he joined the faculty of the Producers Program at UCLA School of Theater, Film and Television.

Sam Katzman died on August 4, 1973, in Hollywood. He is interred in the Hillside Memorial Park Cemetery in Culver City, California.

== Selected filmography ==
As producer unless otherwise mentioned.

- His Private Secretary (executive producer, 1934)
- Western Justice (supervising producer, 1934)
- A Demon for Trouble (supervising producer, 1934)
- Smokey Smith (supervising producer, 1935)
- Tombstone Terror (supervising producer, 1935)
- Hot Off the Press (1935)
- Bars of Hate (1935)
- Alias John Law (1935)
- The Fighting Coward (1935)
- Big Calibre (supervising producer, 1935)
- Danger Ahead (1935)
- A Face in the Fog (supervising producer, 1935)
- Sundown Saunders (supervising producer, 1935)
- Brand of the Outlaws (supervising producer, 1936)
- Rip Roarin' Buckaroo (supervising producer, 1936)
- The Phantom of the Range (1936)
- Shadow of Chinatown (1936, also serial)
- The Rogues Tavern (1936)
- Taming the Wild (1936)
- Rio Grande Romance (1936)
- Kelly of the Secret Service (1936)
- Put on the Spot (1936)
- Two Minutes to Play (1936)
- Silks and Saddles (1936)
- Amateur Crook (1937)
- Orphan of the Pecos (1937)
- Brothers of the West (1937)
- Cheyenne Rides Again (1937)
- Lost Ranch (1937)
- Flying Fists (1937)
- Blake of Scotland Yard (1937, also serial)
- Million Dollar Racket (1937)
- Sky Racket (1937)
- Mystery Range (1937)
- Feud of the Trail (1937)
- Blake of Scotland Yard (1937)
- Six-Gun Trail (1938)
- Lightning Carson Rides Again (1938)
- Texas Wildcats (1939)
- Code of the Cactus (1939)
- Outlaws' Paradise (1939)
- Trigger Fingers (1939)
- The Fighting Renegade (1939)
- Straight Shooter (1939)
- East Side Kids (1940)
- Boys of the City (1940)
- That Gang of Mine (1940)
- Pride of the Bowery (1940)
- Flying Wild (1941)
- Bowery Blitzkrieg (1941)
- Spooks Run Wild (1941)
- Invisible Ghost (1941)
- Zis Boom Bah (1941)
- Mr. Wise Guy (1942)
- Let's Get Tough! (1942)
- Smart Alecks (1942)
- 'Neath Brooklyn Bridge (1942)
- Kid Dynamite (1942)
- Bowery at Midnight (1942)
- Black Dragons (1942)
- The Corpse Vanishes (1942)
- The Ape Man (1943)
- Clancy Street Boys (1943)
- Ghosts on the Loose (1943)
- Mr. Muggs Steps Out (1943)
- Spotlight Scandals (1943)
- Million Dollar Kid (1944)
- Follow the Leader (1944)
- Block Busters (1944)
- Bowery Champs (1944)
- Crazy Knights (1944)
- Voodoo Man (1944)
- Three of a Kind (1944)
- Return of the Ape Man (1944)
- Docks of New York (1945)
- Mr. Muggs Rides Again (1945)
- Come Out Fighting (1945)
- Who's Guilty? (1945 serial)
- Jungle Raiders (1945 serial)
- Trouble Chasers (1945)
- Brenda Starr, Reporter (1945 serial)
- Junior Prom (1946)
- Hop Harrigan America's Ace of the Airways (1946)
- Freddie Steps Out (1946)
- Chick Carter, Detective (1946 serial)
- High School Hero (1946)
- Son of the Guardsman (1946 serial)
- Betty Co-Ed (1946)
- Vacation Days (1947)
- Jack Armstrong (1947 serial)
- The Vigilante (1947)
- Little Miss Broadway (1947)
- The Sea Hound (1947 serial)
- Last of the Redmen (1947)
- Sweet Genevieve (1947)
- Two Blondes and a Redhead (1947)
- Brick Bradford (1947 serial)
- Jungle Jim (1948)
- Racing Luck (1948)
- Congo Bill (1948)
- I Surrender Dear (1948)
- Triple Threat (1948)
- Superman (1948 serial)
- Tex Granger (1948)
- Mary Lou (1948)
- Glamour Girl (1948)
- The Prince of Thieves (1948)
- The Lost Tribe (1949)
- The Adventures of Sir Galahad (1949 serial)
- Chinatown at Midnight (1949)
- Barbary Pirate (1949)
- Batman and Robin (1949 serial)
- The Mutineers (1949)
- Manhattan Angel (1949)
- Bruce Gentry (1949 serial)
- State Penitentiary (1950)
- Revenue Agent (1950)
- Pygmy Island (1950)
- Pirates of the High Seas (1950 serial)
- Last of the Buccaneers (1950)
- Chain Gang (1950)
- Atom Man vs. Superman (1950 serial)
- Captive Girl (1950)
- Cody of the Pony Express (1950 serial)
- Tyrant of the Sea (1950)
- Mark of the Gorilla (1950)
- Captain Video: Master of the Stratosphere (1951)
- The Magic Carpet (1951)
- The Mysterious Island (1951 serial)
- Hurricane Island (1951)
- When the Redskins Rode (1951)
- Roar of the Iron Horse (1951 serial)
- Purple Heart Diary (1951)
- A Yank in Korea (1951)
- Fury of the Congo (1951)
- Jungle Manhunt (1951)
- Son of Geronimo: Apache Avenger (1952 serial)
- Last Train from Bombay (1952)
- Blackhawk: Fearless Champion of Freedom (1952)
- King of the Congo (1952)
- A Yank in Indo-China (1952)
- Jungle Jim in the Forbidden Land (1952)
- The Golden Hawk (1952)
- Brave Warrior (1952)
- California Conquest (1952)
- Voodoo Tiger (1952)
- Thief of Damascus (1952)
- The Pathfinder (1952)
- Slaves of Babylon (1953)
- Prisoners of the Casbah (1953)
- Valley of the Head Hunters (1953)
- The Great Adventures of Captain Kidd (1953 serial)
- The Lost Planet (1953 serial)
- Jack McCall, Desperado (1953)
- Savage Mutiny (1953)
- Target Hong Kong (1953)
- Last of the Redskins (1953)
- Flame of Calcutta (1953)
- Serpent of the Nile (1953)
- Siren of Bagdad (1953)
- Sky Commando (1953)
- Killer Ape (1953)
- Conquest of Cochise (1953)
- Prince of Pirates (1953)
- The 49th Man (1953)
- Mission Over Korea (1953)
- Fort Ti (1953)
- Masterson of Kansas (1954)
- Riding with Buffalo Bill (1954 serial)
- The Law vs. Billy the Kid (1954)
- The Saracen Blade (1954)
- Jungle Man-Eaters (1954)
- Gunfighters of the Northwest (1954 serial)
- Jesse James vs. the Daltons (1954)
- The Iron Glove (1954)
- Charge of the Lancers (1954)
- Drums of Tahiti (1954)
- The Miami Story (1954)
- The Battle of Rogue River (1954)
- Cannibal Attack (1954)
- Jungle Moon Men (1955)
- Devil Goddess (1955)
- Creature with the Atom Brain (executive producer, 1955)
- It Came from Beneath the Sea (executive producer, 1955)
- The Gun That Won the West (1955)
- New Orleans Uncensored (1955)
- Chicago Syndicate (1955)
- The Crooked Web (1955)
- Inside Detroit (1955)
- Teen-Age Crime Wave (1955)
- Duel on the Mississippi (1955)
- The Gun That Won the West (1955)
- Adventures of Captain Africa, Mighty Jungle Avenger! (1955)
- Seminole Uprising (1955)
- Pirates of Tripoli (1955)
- The Houston Story (1956)
- Miami Exposé (1956)
- Perils of the Wilderness (1956 serial)
- Blackjack Ketchum, Desperado (1956)
- Blazing the Overland Trail (1956 serial)
- Cha-Cha-Cha Boom! (1956)
- Rumble on the Docks (1956)
- Earth vs. the Flying Saucers (executive producer, 1956)
- The Werewolf (1956)
- Uranium Boom (1956)
- Rock Around the Clock (1956)
- Utah Blaine (1957)
- The Man Who Turned to Stone (1957)
- Calypso Heat Wave (1957)
- Don't Knock the Rock (1957)
- The Giant Claw (1957)
- Zombies of Mora Tau (1957)
- The Night the World Exploded (1957)
- Escape from San Quentin (1957)
- The Tijuana Story (1957)
- The World Was His Jury (1958)
- Going Steady (1958)
- Crash Landing (1958)
- Life Begins at 17 (1958)
- The Last Blitzkrieg (1959)
- Juke Box Rhythm (1959)
- The Flying Fontaines (1959)
- Lock Up Your Daughters (1959)
- The Enemy General (1960)
- The Wizard of Baghdad (1960)
- Tallahassee 7000 (1961) (TV series)
- Twist Around the Clock (1961)
- Don't Knock the Twist (1961)
- Pirates of Tortuga (1961)
- The Wizard of Baghdad (1961)
- The Wild Westerners (1962)
- Hootenanny Hoot (1963)
- Get Yourself a College Girl (1964)
- Kissin' Cousins (1964)
- Your Cheatin' Heart (1964)
- Harum Scarum (1965)
- When the Boys Meet the Girls (1965)
- Hold On! (1966)
- Hot Rods to Hell (1967)
- Riot on Sunset Strip (1967)
- The Fastest Guitar Alive (1967)
- The Love-Ins (1967)
- For Singles Only (1968)
- A Time to Sing (1968)
- The Young Runaways (1968)
- Angel, Angel, Down We Go (executive producer, 1969)
- How to Succeed with Sex (executive producer, 1970)
- The Loners (executive producer, 1972)

=== Unmade films ===
- film version of Terry and the Pirates after buying film rights from Douglas Fairbanks Jnr (1951)
- sequel to the 1943 serial The Phantom (1955) – when Katzman discovered Columbia no longer had the screen rights to the character, he reshot parts of the finished film and retitled it The Adventures of Captain Africa
- a follow-up to his earlier films starring Bill Haley and Alan Freed, Rock Around the Clock and Don't Knock the Rock (1958). Originally scheduled for production in the fall of 1957, this was later pushed back to 1958 due to Katzman reportedly disliking the script. Production was ultimately cancelled.
- biopic of Pretty Boy Floyd (1959) – stopped by a lawsuit from Kroger Babb
- Lucky based on story by Lillie Hayward (1959)
- Don Quixote, USA starring Robert Morse (1967)

== Bibliography ==
- Wheeler Winston Dixon. Lost in the Fifties: Recovering Phantom Hollywood. Southern Illinois University Press, 2005.
