= Ira H. Morgan =

American cinematographer (1889–1959)

- Born: 2 April 1889; Fort Ross, California, United States
- Died: 10 April 1959 (aged 70); San Rafael, California, US
- Occupation: Cinematographer
- Known for: Work with Columbia Pictures
- Spouse: Rena Carlton

Ira Harry Morgan (2 April 1889 – 10 April 1959) was an American cinematographer. He successfully transitioned from silent movies to sound films.

== Early years ==
Morgan broke in as a cameraman with Gaumont News, a pioneer of newsreels. Later he was behind the camera for Essanay, where the Broncho Billy western series was filmed at Niles Canyon, Alameda County in California. After Essanay discontinued production in 1918, Morgan joined director King Vidor.

== Career ==
During his long career, Morgan worked extensively for major studios such as Paramount Pictures, Warner Bros., and Metro-Goldwyn-Mayer as well as independent producers. Notably, he worked with former Essanay colleague Roland Totheroh on Charles Chaplin's Modern Times (1936). Other credits included George W. Hill's Tell It to the Marines (1926) with Lon Chaney, James Cruze's Washington Merry-Go-Round (1932) with Lee Tracy, Michael Curtiz's Jimmy the Gent (1934) with James Cagney, Frank Buck's Tiger Fangs (1943), Johnny Doesn't Live Here Any More (1944), Jungle Jim (1948), The Lost Tribe (1949), Chain Gang (1950), and Revenue Agent (1950).

In 1944 Morgan was working for Monogram Pictures. His creative photography for the East Side Kids comedy Bowery Champs was noticed by the film's producer, Sam Katzman. When Katzman moved to Columbia Pictures, he took Ira Morgan with him. Morgan went on to photograph many of Columbia's feature films, westerns, serials, and even two-reel comedies.

He also worked in Columbia's television division, Screen Gems, and was a staff cameraman for The Adventures of Rin Tin Tin until his death in 1959.

== Partial filmography ==
- Enchantment (1921)
- Beauty's Worth (1922)
- Enemies of Women (1923)
- Tell It to the Marines (1926)
- The Taxi Dancer (1927)
- Spring Fever (1927)
- Buttons (1927)
- The Duke Steps Out (1929)
- The Great Gabbo (1929)
- Washington Merry-Go-Round (1932)
- The Unwritten Law (1932)
- Whistlin' Dan (1932)
- Son of a Sailor (1933)
- Jimmy the Gent (1934)
- A Girl of the Limberlost (1934)
- Redhead (1934)
- Lost in the Stratosphere (1934)
- Unknown Blonde (1934)
- Girl Overboard (1937)
- The Westland Case (1937)
- Three Legionnaires (1937)
- Damaged Goods (1937)
- Tiger Fangs (1943)
- Charlie Chan in the Secret Service (1944)
- Detective Kitty O'Day (1944)
- The Chinese Cat (1944)
- Johnny Doesn't Live Here Any More (1944)
- Sweethearts of the U.S.A. (1944)
- Docks of New York (1945)
- The Strange Mr. Gregory (1946)
- Jungle Jim (1948)
- The Lost Tribe (1949)
- The Mutineers (1949)
- The Blazing Trail (1949)
- Chain Gang (1950)
- Revenue Agent (1950)
- The Cyclops (1957)
