= Max Jacobson =

American physician (1900–1979)

- Born: July 3, 1900; Fordon, Bromberg, Prussia, German Empire
- Died: December 1, 1979 (aged 79); New York City, New York, U.S.
- Resting place: Mount Hebron Cemetery
- Other name: Dr. Feelgood
- Citizenship: German; American
- Education: Friedrich Wilhelm University of Berlin (MD)
- Occupation: Physician
- Known for: Treating celebrity clients
- Spouse: Nina Hagen (m. 1946; died 1964)
- Children: 1

Max Jacobson (July 3, 1900 – December 1, 1979) was a German and American physician and medical researcher who treated numerous high-profile patients in the United States, including President John F. Kennedy. Jacobson came to be known as "Miracle Max" and "Dr. Feelgood" because he administered highly addictive "vitamin shots" laced with various substances that included amphetamine and methamphetamine.

Largely unknown to the public until his methods were exposed by The New York Times in 1972, Jacobson was charged with unprofessional conduct and fraud in 1973. He eventually lost his medical license in 1975. Jacobson died in December 1979, without regaining his license.

== Early life and education ==
Born in the Fordon, Bromberg, German Empire, Jacobson earned his medical degree from the Friedrich Wilhelm University of Berlin (now the Humboldt University of Berlin). Jacobson, who was Jewish, fled Nazi Germany in 1936. He immigrated to the United States where he established an office on the Upper East Side of Manhattan. In 1941, Jacobson married Nina Hagen. Nina was the daughter of Louis Georg Hagen and granddaughter of Carl Levy, members of the Hagen family of wealthy bankers, and she was a cousin of the singer Nina Hagen.

== Career ==
Jacobson treated dozens of famous clients, including: John F. Kennedy, Mel Allen, Lauren Bacall, Ingrid Bergman, Leonard Bernstein, Humphrey Bogart, Yul Brynner, Maria Callas, Truman Capote, Van Cliburn, Montgomery Clift, Rosemary Clooney, Bob Cummings, Maya Deren, Cecil B. DeMille (who brought Jacobson to Egypt as his personal physician during the filming of The Ten Commandments), Marlene Dietrich, Eddie Fisher, Judy Garland, Hedy Lamarr, Alan Jay Lerner, Oscar Levant, Mickey Mantle, Hugh Martin, Liza Minnelli, Thelonious Monk, Marilyn Monroe, Zero Mostel, Elvis Presley, Anthony Quinn, Paul Robeson, Nelson Rockefeller, David O. Selznick, Elizabeth Taylor, Kay Thompson, Grace Lee Whitney, Helene Stanton, Billy Wilder, and Tennessee Williams. Dubbed "Dr. Feelgood," Jacobson was known for his "miracle tissue regenerator" shots, which consisted of amphetamines, animal hormones, bone marrow, enzymes, human placenta, painkillers, steroids, and multivitamins.

=== Treating John F. Kennedy ===
In September 1960, then-Senator John F. Kennedy first visited Jacobson shortly before the 1960 presidential election debates. Jacobson was part of the presidential entourage at the Vienna summit in 1961, where he administered injections to combat severe back pain. Some of the potential side effects included hyperactivity, impaired judgment, nervousness, and wild mood swings. Kennedy, however, was untroubled by Food and Drug Administration reports on the contents of Jacobson's injections, and proclaimed: "I don't care if it's horse piss. It works." Jacobson was used for the most severe bouts of back pain. By May 1962, Jacobson had visited the White House to treat the president thirty-four times, although such treatments were stopped by President Kennedy's White House physicians, who realized the inappropriate use of steroids and amphetamines administered by Jacobson. It was later observed that President Kennedy's leadership, specifically during the Cuban Missile Crisis and other events during 1963, improved once Jacobson's treatments were discontinued and replaced by a medically appropriate regimen. Dr. Nassir Ghaemi, who studied Kennedy's medical records, concluded there was a "correlation; it is not causation; but it may not be coincidence either".

=== Mickey Mantle treatment incident ===
When he began treating Mickey Mantle in late September 1961 for a case of the flu, Jacobson's injection into Mantle's hip caused a severe abscessing septic infection at the injection site that hospitalized Mantle and threatened his career. It also sidelined him from the Yankees' quest for the 1961 AL Pennant – which they won by 10 games – as well as the much higher profile home run race between Mantle and teammate Roger Maris (#9), which Maris won. Maris also broke Babe Ruth's all time single season home run record of 60 by hitting his 61st home run on the last day of the season. While his treatment of Mantle should have – as several medical regulators admitted later – gotten the attention of those who knew better, it did not alert anyone to Jacobson's improper practices. This failure to recognize the problem was also blamed on the reality of Mantle's lifestyle and his often being hungover or otherwise ill from alcohol abuse and a generally unhealthy lifestyle. This illness was seen by most as just another episode in Mantle's self destructive lifestyle.

=== Helene Stanton ===
Jacobson treated singer and actress Helene Stanton, early in her career while she was performing in Las Vegas under a demanding schedule. After relocating to Los Angeles for film work, and unaware of the risks associated with Jacobson’s treatments, Stanton developed symptoms of amphetamine withdrawal, including sleep disturbances and mood agitation. Her Los Angeles physician recognized the condition and successfully treated her for amphetamine dependence. Stanton's son, physician and media personality Dr. Drew Pinsky, later discussed his mother’s experience and Jacobson’s methods in Season 2, Episode 4 (“Dr. Feel Goods”) of the television series Hollywood Demons.

== Later years and death ==
By the late 1960s, Jacobson's behavior became increasingly erratic, as his own amphetamine usage had increased. He began working 24-hour days, and was seeing up to thirty patients per day. In 1969, one of Jacobson's clients, former presidential photographer Mark Shaw, died at the age of 47. An autopsy showed that Shaw had died of "acute and chronic intravenous amphetamine poisoning". Under questioning, Jacobson's staff admitted to buying large quantities of amphetamines to give many high level doses. In an exposé on December 4, 1972, that brought Jacobson national attention, The New York Times reported that his office ordered 80 grams (3 oz) of amphetamine each month, "enough to make 100 fairly strong doses of 25 milligrams [3/8 gr.] every day," and that "a substantial quantity of amphetamines he had purchased was unaccounted for".

The Bureau of Narcotics and Dangerous Drugs seized Jacobson's supply, and his medical license was revoked on April 25, 1975, by the New York State Board of Regents. In 1979, Jacobson attempted to regain his license but was denied. A state spokesman stated that the then 79-year-old Jacobson did not seem ready to enter into the "mainstream of practice" again. Jacobson died later that year on December 1 in New York City. His funeral was held at the Frank E. Campbell Funeral Chapel in Manhattan on December 3. Jacobson is buried in Mount Hebron Cemetery, next to his second wife, Nina (who died in 1964), and his parents.

== See also ==
- VIP medicine
