= List of The Jetsons episodes =

The Jetsons is an American animated sitcom produced by Hanna-Barbera, originally airing in primetime from 1962 to 1963 on ABC, with new episodes airing in first-run syndication from 1985 to 1987. It was Hanna-Barbera's Space Age counterpart to The Flintstones.

== Series overview ==
Season	Episodes	Originally released		
Season	Episodes	First released	Last released	Network
1	24	September 23, 1962	March 3, 1963	ABC
2	41	September 16, 1985	December 13, 1985	Syndication
3	10	October 19, 1987	November 12, 1987	Syndication

== Episodes ==
=== Season 1 (1962–63) ===
In the original closing credits, George came home and tried to walk Astro, the family dog, but when Astro noticed a cat by the electronic dog walk, he began to chase it, and George got caught into the dog-walk which begins going too fast. After jumping to safety on a wall Astro and the cat both looked on as George is trapped on the out-of-control dog walker running for his life while crying out "Jane, stop this crazy thing! Help! JANE!" This was a counterpart to The Flintstones' closing credits in which the saber-toothed cat Baby Puss puts Fred Flintstone out for the night. This ending was parodied in an episode each of Animaniacs, The Adventures of Jimmy Neutron, Boy Genius, Family Guy, Clarence, and Jim Henson's Muppet Babies.

Season 1 contained a laugh track, which was removed when the episodes were released for syndication in 1985. The syndicated episodes were also "updated" with a re-recorded theme song, episode title cards, and a new closing sequence (see Season 2 below). The title cards and the closing sequence featured the character of Orbitty, who did not appear in any of the original episodes.

The 24 episodes from the 1960s were released to DVD in Region 1 in May 2004 with the laugh track, original closing sequence, and original opening theme intact. However, the DVD release still featured the 1980s "Orbitty" title cards, and the original Flintstones-style teaser intros were not reinstated. (The versions of "The Space Car" and "The Coming of Astro" available on Amazon Video on Demand retain the original opening teasers.)

Rosie the Robot's name was sometimes spelled "Rosey", especially after the 1985 revival series when it appeared on the added title card for episode one. This episode did not have a title card when it aired in 1962. The "Rosie" spelling appeared on the 1962 original soundtrack album containing the first episode, as well as the largest percentage of merchandise and printed material, although there were some that also spelled it "Rosey."

No. overall	No. in season	Title	Written by	Original release date	Prod. code	U.S. households (millions)
1	1	"Rosie the Robot"	Larry Markes	September 23, 1962	V–2	8.27
Tired of housework, Jane hires a robot maid named Rosie, unaware that George is bringing his boss Mr. Spacely home to plead poverty and ask for a raise. Note: Mrs. Spacely's name is "Stella" in this episode.
2	2	"A Date with Jet Screamer"	Harvey Bullock	September 30, 1962	V–1	7.37
Fed up with Judy's obsession over pop idol Jet Screamer (Howard Morris), George sabotages her entry into a songwriting contest by substituting Elroy's secret code "Eep, Opp, Ork, Ah-ah". However, much to George’s surprise and dismay, Judy wins the contest. As the winner, she gets to go on a date with Jet Screamer. Note: This episode marked Howard Morris' first voice-acting role for Hanna-Barbera.
3	3	"Jetson's Nite Out"	Harvey Bullock & R.S. Allen	October 7, 1962	V–3	8.22
Mr. Spacely asks George to join him at the championship robot football game, but they must lie to their wives to get out of prior commitments.
4	4	"The Space Car"	Barry E. Blitzer	October 14, 1962	V–4	6.77
George and Jane go car shopping, unaware that they've accidentally switched cars with a bank robber named Knuckles Nuclear.
5	5	"The Coming of Astro"	Tony Benedict	October 21, 1962	V–5	7.77
When the rest of the family wants to keep Astro, a stray dog Elroy brought home from the park, George brings home robotic dog 'Lectronimo as a compromise.
6	6	"The Good Little Scouts"	Larry Markes	October 28, 1962	V–6	N/A
George reluctantly takes Elroy's scout troop on a trip to the moon—and promptly gets lost.
7	7	"The Flying Suit"	Tony Benedict	November 4, 1962	V–8	6.28
The rivalry between Spacely Sprockets and Cogswell Cogs comes to a head when Cogswell's chief inventor Moonstone reveals the prototype of a suit that enables its wearer to fly. Note: This is the first episode to feature a narrator.
8	8	"Rosie's Boyfriend"	Walter Black	November 11, 1962	V–9	7.87
Rosie finds a beau in Henry Orbit's mechanical assistant, named Mac.
9	9	"Elroy's TV Show"	Warren Foster	November 18, 1962	V–7	9.31
When Elroy lands a starring role in the new television show "Spaceboy Zoom and His Dog Astro" upon them being discovered by TV executive Mr. Transistor, George becomes an over-enthusiastic stage father.
10	10	"Uniblab"	Barry E. Blitzer	November 25, 1962	V–10	8.17
George fumes at having to work under the electronic sycophant Uniblab. Notes: Episode later retitled "Microchip Chump." Uniblab re-appears again in "G.I. Jetson" but he is green instead of blue.
11	11	"A Visit from Grandpa"	Story by : Joseph Hoffman; Teleplay by : Walter Black	December 2, 1962	V–12	7.87
George's 110-year-old grandfather Montague arrives for a visit and gets caught up in a series of misadventures.
12	12	"Astro's Top Secret"	Tony Benedict	December 9, 1962	V–11	4.48
When he accidentally swallows Elroy's new flying car toy and gains the ability to fly, Astro is given the third degree when Cogswell suspects him to be party to a new Spacely Sprockets invention. Note: This is the second episode to feature a narrator.
13	13	"Las Venus"	Barry E. Blitzer	December 16, 1962	V–13	7.17
On their second honeymoon, George must divide his time between taking Jane out and wooing Gigi Galaxy, a potential client of Spacely Sprockets.
14	14	"Elroy's Pal"	Walter Black	December 23, 1962	V–14	6.03
Elroy is enamored of TV superhero Nimbus the Great who may not be as great as he seems.
15	15	"Test Pilot"	Harvey Bullock & R.S. Allen	December 30, 1962	V–15	N/A
A mishap at the doctor's office has George believing he is about to die, so he volunteers for hazard duty, testing an "indestructible" jacket.
16	16	"Millionaire Astro"	Tony Benedict	January 6, 1963	V–16	7.87
Astro is caught in a custody battle between the Jetsons and millionaire J.P. Gottrockets, Astro's original owner, who had named the dog Tralfaz after his lawyer Mr. Withers fails to reclaim him twice. Note: This is the third episode to feature a narrator.
17	17	"The Little Man"	Tony Benedict	January 13, 1963	V–17	7.77
George is shrunk down to a height of six inches by Spacely's new Minivac machine. But when the machine malfunctions, George must sneak into Cogswell Cogs to steal a part to repair it and get back to his original size.
18	18	"Jane's Driving Lesson"	Story by : Joanna Lee; Teleplay by : Dalton Sandifer	January 20, 1963	V–18	7.47
After one too many trips on the bus, Jane demands George allow her to take driving lessons. Meanwhile, Knuckles Nuclear has escaped from prison as Jane accidentally ends up in a car with him.
19	19	"G.I. Jetson"	Barry E. Blitzer	January 27, 1963	V–19	7.62
George's Space Guard unit is brought up for training, where George finds himself under the command of his boss, Major Spacely and Sargent Uniblab.
20	20	"Miss Solar System"	Barry E. Blitzer	February 3, 1963	V–20	7.37
Jane enters a beauty pageant to prove to her husband that she is just as beautiful as movie star Gina Lolajupiter.
21	21	"Private Property"	Barry E. Blitzer	February 10, 1963	V–21	7.17
When Cogswell opens a new office next door to spy on Spacely Sprockets, George is charged with finding a way to get rid of Cogswell. Episode later retitled "No Space for Sprockets".
22	22	"Dude Planet"	Walter Black	February 17, 1963	V–22	8.12
When Jane gets overly tired from doing push button housework, her doctor prescribes a vacation at a dude ranch.
23	23	"TV or Not TV"	Tony Benedict	February 24, 1963	V–23	7.87
George and Astro witness a bank robbery and go into hiding, unaware that the robbery was actually just actors shooting a scene for a television show.
24	24	"Elroy's Mob"	Barry E. Blitzer	March 3, 1963	V–24	7.67
After classmate Kenny Countdown secretly switches report card tapes, Elroy tries to explain that the “two Ds, two Fs and an H” were not his, George sends Elroy to his room with no dinner. George and Jane later learn the truth from Kenny’s father but discover that Elroy and Astro have “flown” away from home. The two end up getting innocently involved with criminals Muggsy Megaton, Microbe, and Chuckles the Gorilla.

=== Season 2 (1985) ===
- For the 1980s incarnation of the show, new characters were introduced, including Orbitty (the Jetson family's alien pet) and Spacely's inventive nephew Orwell. George's work computer R.U.D.I. (the "Referential Universal Digital Indexer"), who appeared in one 1960s episode, was reintroduced in a recurring role.
- The opening credits featured a rerecorded version of The Jetsons theme song, which features the use of electronic drums to create percussion typical of 1980s music.
- The closing credits are static picture captions (like most of Hanna-Barbera's shows of the time). This format replaced the original credit sequence described above when the 1960s episodes were rebroadcast.
- Starting from "Judy's Birthday Surprise" to season 3 onward, the series is switched into digital ink and paint.

No. overall	No. in season	Title	Written by	Original release date	Prod. code
25	1	"Elroy Meets Orbitty"	Mark Young	September 16, 1985	0008-8401
During a school field trip to a remote asteroid, Elroy finds an odd pink rock, which turns out to be an egg that hatches into Orbitty, a spring-legged creature. When the family start loving Orbitty more than him, Astro runs away and gets caught by Felix the Dogcatcher because Astro didn't have his collar on. Now Elroy and Orbitty must work to rescue Astro.
26	2	"Rosie Come Home"	Glenn Leopold	September 17, 1985	0008-8426
Due to a malfunction in her systems, Rosie believes that she is about to be replaced, so she runs off. After the family finds her and she sees the Mechano Maid 2000 as a replacement, Rosie is nearly crushed within a car destroyer, until the Jetsons are able to convince her that she is a part of the family. She even proves it by throwing the Mechano Maid 2000 out the window.
27	3	"Solar Snoops"	Barry E. Blitzer	September 18, 1985	0008-8425
An unknown package delivered to Spacely Sprockets contains a robot sentry dog named "Sentro", and Spacely decides to use it to guard his "Chocolate Microchip Cookie". However, the "Galacta Sneak"—a spy for Cogswell Cogs—has pulled a Trojan Horse–type move by hiding inside Sentro's body to infiltrate Spacely's plant. When he and Sentro steal the prototype Microchip Cookie, it is up to George Jetson—who discovers a want-ad in the news for an executive secretary for Cogswell Cogs—to become "Georgina Jetstream", infiltrate Cogswell Cogs, and get Spacely's cookie back.
28	4	"Judy's Birthday Surprise"	Mark Young	September 19, 1985	0008-8412
Judy seems to think that nobody remembered her birthday when she brings it up with her interactive diary Di-Di, until one of the more unpopular kids shows her that she is indeed loved. She was shocked to discover that nobody said anything about her birthday. She is soon surprised when everyone, including Mr. Spacely, throws her one of the best surprise parties ever.
29	5	"SuperGeorge"	George Atkins	September 20, 1985	0008-8409
The Jetsons have previously gotten items from Nebulous Nifty which has gone awry for them. One automatic banana peeler has shorted out the visaphone and other electronic devices and a mishap with the dandruff ray had taken George awhile for him to grow his hair back. They soon buy a Thinko machine from a Nebulous Nifty salesman that enables the family to envision the following: Jane and George being waited on; Judy wishes that she can be a winner of the Teen Star of the Year awards; Elroy's wish was to be a basketball player (but he was too tall for the goal); Astro wishes that dogs (including him) would act like humans, and vice versa. When George uses the Thinko again to help out around the house, it explodes while giving George superpowers for the day as he operates as SuperGeorge. After George gets fired by Mr. Spacely for breaking the company during a merger deal, he is approached in the park by a fight promoter who offers him a match against the Jupiter Juggernaut. After Rosie got the sales robot back to their home and has its love processor removed so that it can stop chasing Rosie, Jane learns that the superpowers that George has will expire in a day. As Spacely attends the fight hoping that George will lose, Jane gets out a sign to George during his fight about his expiring powers as George returns to normal getting crushed by the Jupiter Juggernaut in the process. Back at home, George gets a call from Spacely thanking him for losing against the Jupiter Juggernaut and win the bet. When George asks about who the merger was with, Spacely states that his company is now the Spacely Nebulous Nifty Sprockets. George states to Spacely that Nebulous Nifty was known for products that self-destruct as the building collapses and Spacely fires George for something that isn't his fault. As the love processor was accidentally put back into Rosie, she chases the sales robot as George and Jane chase each other in the same manner.
30	6	"Family Fallout"	Mark Seidenberg	September 23, 1985	0008-8427
After some chicanery by Mr. Spacely, the Jetsons appear on a game show called "Family Fallout" (based on Family Feud), facing off against the Spacelys. Astro was called in during the game show when the host Richard Rocketeer mentions that they can't allow robots like Rosie on the game. When it comes to part two of the showdown, George temporarily loses his voice and Rosie finds out that Mr. Spacely is using RUDI as his secret weapon. The Jetsons win a new Foodarackacycle in the end, while the shocked and dismayed Spacelys receive a lifetime supply of Cogswells Cogs.
31	7	"Instant Replay"	George Atkins	September 24, 1985	0008-8428
George is picked up by a bus when his car breaks down as the bus driver reluctantly allows him on despite his lack of tokens. While on the ride home, an elderly scientist on the bus home offers George a better life with a special invention called "Replayola". When George accidentally erases his wedding day with Jane while trying to erase the kiss she shared with a man named Bunky Bingston, he must make a choice to either keep his newfound wealth and power or forego it and regain his normal family life.
32	8	"Fugitive Fleas"	Barry E. Blitzer	September 25, 1985	0008-8417
Rock and Roll fleas take refuge on Astro to escape the tyrannical Solarini's flea circus.
33	9	"S.M.A.S.H."	Barry E. Blitzer	September 26, 1985	0008-8420
Mr. Spacely leaves his car with the Jetsons while he is away on important business. Jane accidentally crashes Mr. Spacely's car that she borrowed. When the police get involved and he hears what happened Mr. Spacely merrily blames George and makes him a virtual slave and groveler with his lawyer Mr. Slick present. It was later discovered that the brakes are jammed by a piece of fine space china from one of Spacely's space china collections. This absolves the Jetsons, and then the tables are turned and a furious and humiliated Spacely becomes the reluctant servant of George.
34	10	"One Strike, You're Out"	Mark Young	September 30, 1985	0008-8424
When Spacely discovers that his rival Cogswell has won the "Tycoon of the Day" Award, he goes all out to beat him, forcing all his employees to work a "Triple-Shift". After 24 hours of work and severe hounding by Spacely, George accidentally convinces the human employees of Spacely Sprockets to go on strike. Meanwhile, George is faced with his own problems when he destroys Elroy's athlete robot, "Jocko", and then tries to impress his son by portraying the robot himself.
35	11	"Mother's Day for Rosie"	Harvey Bullock	October 1, 1985	0008-8416
It is Mother's Day in Orbit City, but Rosie is in no mood for celebrating, as it reminds her of her own deactivated mother. But George is determined to find the blueprints of the "XB-400" (predecessor of the XB-500, Rosie's model number) and give Rosie back her happiness.
36	12	"S'No Relative"	Barry E. Blitzer and Tony Benedict	October 2, 1985	0008-8423
George and Jane's nephew Hunky Moonrock is scheduled to visit Earth. When a research team loses a frozen inhabitant from the planet Polaris, everything is turned upside down when that alien is thawed out right at the Jetsons' back door.
37	13	"Dance Time"	George Atkins	October 3, 1985	0008-8411
Jane convinces George to take dancing lessons so he won't embarrass Judy at her housewarming party, but his uncoordinated moves lead a mechanic to offer him some help with Automatic Dancing Shoes.
38	14	"Judy Takes Off"	Mark Young	October 7, 1985	0008-8432
When Judy is offered a chance to get away from her family and visit her cousin Melissa, she is at first reluctant. She thinks differently when she sees how much her cousin has changed, leading George to inadvertently assume the role of "Space Ace" to spy on his daughter to keep her out of trouble. Meanwhile, Jane and Mrs. Spacely both vie for the "Woman of the Year" Award.
39	15	"Winner Takes All"	Pamela Burton and Laura Numeroff	October 9, 1985	0008-8406
George is duped into an Olympic-themed showdown with Cogswell Cogs. When Cogswell pulls a twin-brother substitution, can George come out on top when he doesn't know who is who?
40	16	"The Mirrormorph"	Glenn Leopold	October 11, 1985	0008-8415
The Jetsons contend with a transmuting alien called the Mirrormorph, who can become an exact duplicate of that person while remaining mute after a mix-up causes it to end up ejected from the lab of Professor Proteus and Dr. Quark. While the Mirrormorph gets George into trouble when it causes mischief as Mr. Spacely, George is fired and Jane advises him to get back at Mr. Spacely by asking Mr. Cogswell for a job. Though the Mirrormorph follows George to Cogswell Cogs after becoming the police officer it came in contact with. Meanwhile, Jane plans to get the Jetson family a second car.
41	17	"The Cosmic Courtship of George and Jane"	John Semper	October 14, 1985	0008-8421
George forgets his and Jane's wedding anniversary, and the twosome reminisce about how they fell in love after getting him away from Flash Flotsam. Later on, the couple find out on the news that the minister that married them was an imposter named Louie Chameleon, so they must set things right and renew their vows in Las Venus. George realizes that it will be difficult when Spacely and Flash Flotsam are also present in Las Venus. After the successful wedding, Spacely catches George and almost fires him, but Jane convinces Spacely to change his mind by telling him that she didn't see Mrs. Spacely in a while.
42	18	"High Moon"	Bill Allen	October 15, 1985	0008-8407
George is fed up with his son Elroy's fixation with a television star named Roger Mars, so he decides to take the family on a road trip to rediscover the roots of the Old West. This ends up leading George into a showdown with the outlaw Bad Bart Blaster.
43	19	"Hi-Tech Wreck"	Tony Benedict	October 17, 1985	0008-8413
Due to R.U.D.I.'s constant malfunctions, Spacely threatens to have George and his family reassigned to the planet of Outer Moongolia where George will be selling sprockets door to door to the invisible inhabitants. After the family hears of what happened to R.U.D.I., Elroy makes a temporary program for R.U.D.I. and has his dad advise Mr. Spacely to keep it on the low setting until he has made a better version of it. After R.U.D.I. malfunctions a second time during Mr. Spacely's merger deal with Mr. Megabucks of Megabucks Intergalactic Financial Corp. who raises R.U.D.I.'s level high enough to get hurt, Mr. Spacely angrily orders George to report to Outer Moongolia. George and his family relocate to Outer Moongolia as Elroy laments that he didn't get the opportunity to give R.U.D.I. a new programming. When R.U.D.I. is brought back online, Mr. Spacely is forced to eat crow when R.U.D.I. threatens to destroy his factory with a meltdown. With George rehired, he places the new permanent program into R.U.D.I.
44	20	"Little Bundle of Trouble"	Kerry Ehrin and Ali Marie Matheson	October 18, 1985	0008-8410
The Jetsons take in an abandoned baby they found on their doorstep, but are surprised when this "baby" turns out to be a dwarf of a jewel thief named Tiny Terror in disguise.
45	21	"Elroy in Wonderland"	Mike Dirham	October 22, 1985	0008-8404
Corresponding to Alice's Adventures in Wonderland and The Wonderful Wizard of Oz, Elroy and Astro are forced to be separated while on vacation at Club Mellowstar when the robot activity director won't let them in. While avoiding the robot activity director and the robot staff, Elroy and Astro end up in a trash container which drops down the shoot. Upon falling unconscious, they wind up in a dream world where they meet antique robots resembling our modern-day appliances. Elroy and Astro befriend the antique robots Happy Jethammer, Zoom Broom, and the Pliers Robot who states that the Saturn Trash Stasher might help them get home. While reluctant at first, the Saturn Trash Stasher agrees to help them in exchange that the capture the Wicked Wrench of the West. This leads Elroy, Astro, and their robot friends into conflict with the Wicked Witch of the West and her minions the Saturn Cyclops and the Nozzle where Elroy's group is victorious in the end. Upon their return, they find that the Saturn Trash Stasher is operated by an old man who left the real world upon all the antique robots going out of style and that he, Elroy, and Astro are now trapped in this land. At the advice of Happy Jethammer, Elroy and Astro wish themselves home. They wake up as George, Jane, Judy, and Orbitty find them. When tools are found in the same trash container, Rosie uses the wrench she found to reprogram the robot activity director to admit Elroy and Astro into Club Mellowstar.
46	22	"The Swiss Family Jetson"	David N. Gottlieb and Herb Engelhardt	October 23, 1985	0008-8405
When George is laid off by Spacely for six months, the family convinces him to live off the land on Planet Paradisio due to a neighbor who plays his big drums loud. They get the shock of their lives when a redevelopment company later turns their quaint little paradise into condo estates.
47	23	"Rip-Off Rosie"	George Atkins	October 24, 1985	0008-8414
George is hailed a hero when he repairs a malfunctioning shipping robot. When Rosie starts to malfunction afterwards after eating a bad nut and steal everything she can find, the Jetsons must reprogram her "Jekyll and Hyde" personality.
48	24	"Fantasy Planet"	Lane Raichert	October 28, 1985	0008-8422
With all the problems the Jetson family have, they decide to take a trip to Fantasy Planet (a take on Fantasy Island) after being directed there by Grandma Ganymede after helping to fix her space car. The host Mr. Rocket and his two-headed assistant Teetoo has each family member in capsules to live out their fantasies: George: Boss of Jetson's Sprockets.; Jane: Queen of an asteroid where she does absolutely nothing.; Judy: World-renowned pop star.; Elroy and Astro: To be like Captain Zoom and fight crime.; After realizing their fantasies aren't really what they were looking for due to various reasons, they use a special "stop watch" that can end their fantasies.
49	25	"Space Bong"	Alex Lovy	October 30, 1985	0008-8402
Mr. Spacely tells George that he and Mrs. Spacely will be coming over for dinner. It is a case of mistaken identity when George is kidnapped by an enemy spy organization called SNEAK led by Skata Hara while running some errands for Jane. During his ordeal as their captive, George discovers his exact doppelganger, a secret agent named Space Bong (a take on James Bond), who aids him in escaping their grasp. Note: This is the fourth episode to feature a narrator.
50	26	"Haunted Halloween"	Mark Young	October 31, 1985	0008-8429
Dr. Scarum is the owner of Scarem's Costume Shop and Waxie. He and his hunchbacked robot assistant Edgar take a special interest in Orbitty wanting to make him his special project in time for Halloween. At the same time, George works on his magic tricks.
51	27	"Astro's Big Moment"	Chuck Coach and Alex Lovy	November 1, 1985	0008-8419
Mr. Spacely assigns George to be the judge for the annual Spacely Space Sprockets Space Dog Show. But this leads to a very stressful situation for him as his family wants him to make Astro the winner, as well as the boss wanting him to insure his wife's poodle Fifi comes out on top. Even a mobster named Mangler Mars gets into the act by making George choose his bulldog Starbite as the top dog....or else. What choice will George make? In a turn of events, Starbite is revealed to be a stolen dog which gets Mangler Mars and his underland arrested. Mrs. Spacely's pooch gets taken away to give birth to puppies. Astro wins with a stray dog winning a consolation prize: dog food.
52	28	"Jetsons' Millions"	O. Gordy	November 4, 1985	0008-8436
Spacely offers George a raffle book for the Venutian Sweepstakes, but Mrs. Spacely is offended when George actually wins the grand prize of 10,000,000 Venuties.
53	29	"The Wrong Stuff"	Barry E. Blitzer	November 5, 1985	0008-8431
After winning a school science contest, Elroy is invited with the family to view a space shuttle launch. But he gets more than he bargains for when he and Astro get aboard the shuttle and get launched into deep space. They're able to return to Earth, but are significantly changed in terms of age. Note: A parody of The Right Stuff.
54	30	"The Vacation"	Alex Lovy	November 7, 1985	0008-8401
When Jane wins a family weekend trip on "The Love Rocket", she and George find that their vacation isn't all it is cracked up to be, as they must both deal with old flames from their high-school days with Jane running into her boyfriend Blinky Sunspot and George running into his cheerleader ex-girlfriend Sally Spaceout.
55	31	"Team Spirit"	Gary Warne	November 11, 1985	0008-8408
The Spacely Sprockets and the Cogswell Cogs are at war on the robot baseball field and George is the star pitcher for Spacely's team. But when Cogswell tips the scales in his favor, will Jetson have enough energy to last the final inning?
56	32	"Future Tense"	George Atkins	November 12, 1985	0008-8430
When Jane tries on glasses she bought from Planet Bevdayo, she gains the power of clairvoyance. After she sees different visions, Jane is taken out into town by George to see the results. Their biggest test is at the race tracks where Jane's glasses predicts each of the winners. Though they soon end up pursued by two people that they think might be gangsters. It later turned out to be agents from the IRS who claim their winnings to cover the payments they own. In the final scene, the Jetsons get the glasses from Planet Bevdayo which have different powers like x-ray vision, seeing the past, and showing what they look like when they are old.
57	33	"Far-Out Father"	Mark Young	November 13, 1985	0008-8418
Elroy must make a Father's Day Video for his school class, but Astro's fixation with the poodle next door causes more problems than either Elroy or George can handle.
58	34	"Dog Daze Afternoon"	Barbara Levy and Marc Paykuss	November 15, 1985	0008-8434
George and Jane accompany Mr. Spacely to a business convention where they hope to show off the company's latest invention, the EXIT (EXecutive Instant Transporter). Meanwhile, Judy is in charge of the household as Elroy tests his own invention, a Dog Trainer, in hopes of earning money helping the neighborhood dogs to better behave themselves. But a mix-up of program discs causes near disastrous results on both sides that could lead to George's firing and Elroy having to look for all the missing dogs.
59	35	"Grandpa and the Galactic Gold Digger"	Evelyn A-R Gabai and Glenn Leopold	November 19, 1985	0008-8439
Grandpa Montague Jetson returns and falls in love with a young teenager named Nova Neutron, unknown to him that her boyfriend Tyco has mistaken him for Mr. Spacely and plans to rob him blind.
60	36	"Robot's Revenge"	George Atkins	November 20, 1985	0008-8435
After an incompetent robot at the gym named Ralph is fired from his 32nd job, he decides to take his revenge out on the person who caused his termination....George Jetson. This causes Ralph to give out a signal telling all robots that George can't be trusted. This ends up affecting George's life at work and at home. Meanwhile, Jane is getting a visit from Aunt Eckler who wants to claim Rosie as her own.
61	37	"To Tell the Truth"	Harvey Bullock	November 22, 1985	0008-8437
George convinces Elroy to tell his mother the truth about what happened to her favorite pitcher. When actress Bubbles Blastoff, a guest at Spacely's plant, must leave on the red-eye back to her planet, George ends up being stranded with her on an asteroid. Will he follow his own example and tell the truth to Jane about why he never returned home until morning?
62	38	"Boy George"	Charles M. Howell IV & Alan Burnett	November 25, 1985	0008-8440
When Spacely convinces George that he is too old to represent Spacely Sprockets, he tries a quick fix to become younger—with disastrous results.
63	39	"Judy's Elopement"	Jeff Hall	November 27, 1985	0008-8438
Spacely hires his nephew Sam to be George's new supervisor, but Sam has his own plans: to elope with Cogswell's daughter Asteroid. However, mixed messages from Rosie convince George that Judy is eloping with Sam.
64	40	"The Century's Best"	Mark Young	November 29, 1985	0008-8441
The Space-Time Capsule Contest is underway and Orbitty has an entry form for qualification. However, only one story entry per form will be accepted and the Jetsons exhaust themselves fighting for control of the contest entry. After an unlikely ally helps them combine their entries into one, the Jetsons are declared "Future Family of the Year". Note: "The Century's Best" contains clips from past Jetsons episodes "Elroy Meets Orbitty", "Judy's Birthday Surprise", "The Cosmic Courtship of George and Jane" and "SuperGeorge".
65	41	"A Jetson Christmas Carol"	Barbara Levy and Marc Paykuss	December 13, 1985	0008-8433
Based on Charles Dickens' "A Christmas Carol", Mr. Spacely orders George to work overtime on Christmas Eve, which begins to exhaust him. Meanwhile, Astro is injured in a freak accident while chasing a toy robot cat swallowing a sprocket, causing him to suffer a life-threatening illness. Spacely is then visited by the ghost of his former partner Marsley who state that he will be visited by three spirits that will convince Spacely that Christmas is a time for giving. The Ghost of Christmas Past shows Spacely his childhood with George and his first day with the woman that became Mrs. Spacely. The Ghost of Christmas Present shows Spacely the Jetson family's predicament with Astro. The Ghost of Christmas Yet to Come shows the Jetsons having become rich when Astro's death caused the Jetsons to sue Spacely's Sprockets since it made the sprocket that killed Astro which led to the company collapsing, Mrs. Spacely leaving Mr. Spacely, dogs chasing Mr. Spacely on the streets, and that Mr. Spacely was last seen on skid row where utter poverty and total humiliation did him in which George admitted that he felt bad for his former boss. Once the visits are done, Spacely decides to help the Jetsons by giving them presents and enlisting his veterinarian to get the sprocket out of Astro enabling him a speedy recovery. Note: Fred and Wilma Flintstone make a cameo as characters on a movie screen.

=== Season 3 (1987) ===
No. overall	No. in season	Title	Written by	Original release date	Prod. code
66	1	"Crime Games"	Haskell Barkin	October 19, 1987	8701 87-1
A malfunction of the TeleViewer causes Elroy to discover a robbery plot by "The Gripfather" (a take on "The Godfather"), and George ends up trapped in the middle of it.
67	2	"ASTROnomical I.Q."	George Atkins	October 21, 1987	87-2
Elroy invents a machine that can accelerate evolution, and Astro is turned into a super-genius, which leads to a series of catastrophes that nearly result in the family losing their home. Astro and George soon end up on a game show called "Brain Busters" hosted by Wink Martiandale.
68	3	"9 to 5 to 9"	Barry O'Brien and Bob Smith	October 23, 1987	87-3
When Judy's latest crush Rocky Retro falls for Marsha VanMarsdale's new car, Judy is determined to earn enough money to pay for her own car—even if it means she has to work around the clock.
69	4	"Invisibly Yours, George"	Bruce Howard	October 27, 1987	87-4
Several mishaps with Spacely's new "Spot Remover" devised by Orwell Spacely causes George to become invisible.
70	5	"Father/Daughter Dance"	Haskell Barkin	October 29, 1987	87-5
Judy does not want to be embarrassed at this year's Father/Daughter Dance, so George makes arrangements with Grandpa Jetson to replace him as Judy's partner.
71	6	"Clean as a Hound's Tooth"	George Atkins	November 2, 1987	87-6
George discovers that he has become stressed out lately due to his teeth, so his dentist creates special false teeth to relax him. This ends up stressing him out even more when they make him act like a dog.
72	7	"Wedding Bells for Rosey"	Mark Young	November 4, 1987	87-7
When Mac is marked for permanent deactivation, George discovers that Henry's robot must marry another with an updated BEBOP or be recycled.
73	8	"The Odd Pod"	Barry E. Blitzer	November 6, 1987	87-8
Jane buys an alien plant called the Martian Creeper which was meant for an exotic plant contest, but it wreaks havoc on the apartment. Meanwhile, George tries to perfect his Barbershop Quartet performance.
74	9	"Two Many Georges"	Harvey Bullock	November 10, 1987	87-9
George is convinced by Orwell Spacely to clone himself and improve his traits after Orwell tested his new invention on a chimpanzee. But this new-and-improved George leads the original into believing that his family doesn't need him anymore.
75	10	"Spacely for a Day"	Haskell Barkin	November 12, 1987	87-10
At the advice of Professor Nebula at the time when Mrs. Spacely wants a vacation, Mr. Spacely convinces all his employees to take an aptitude test and makes sure George scores the lowest. But when Judy, Elroy and Astro alter his father's score to be higher than everyone else's, George is given charge of Spacely's Sprockets while Mr. Spacely is away. Upon discovering that George is in charge of Spacely's plant, Cogswell makes plans to destroy Spacely Space Sprockets once and for all and attempts to ensure that George takes the fall that involves tricking him into making sprockets for Universal Galactic Products Unlimited (a fake company which hasn't paid their bill in 20 years) and using a special chemical that would melt Spacely's Sprockets. While the chemical attack fails upon Jane finding out upon getting Elroy to apologize for changing the scores causes Cogswell's Cogs to be melted instead, Mr. Spacely fires George when he finds out about Universal Galactic Products Unlimited's purchase. When Mr. Cogswell calls up George to tell him that his business is melted, George tells him that he got fired because of the deadbeat customer he hooked him up with. Cogswell offers to buy the sprockets from Spacely's Sprockets until he rebuilds. While assisting RUDI into getting George to up the price on that purchase from Mr. Cogswell, Spacely rehires George upon being impressed with his new personality at his usual price. George then quotes "It's the new me and the old you".
