= Rob Little =

American comedian

- Born: December 24, 1972 (age 53); Pinconning, Michigan, U.S.
- Occupation: Comedian
- Years active: 1998–present

Rob Little (born December 24, 1972) is an American comedian and actor from Pinconning, Michigan. He has been performing stand-up comedy since 1998 and has been acting in movies and television. He has also produced five straight-to-DVD comedy specials based on his stand-up. His humor is often self-deprecating, although he prides himself as the "happiest happy person in America".

== Early life ==
Growing up, Little had a difficult time in elementary school due to being overweight. In an interview, Little stated, "In elementary school, kids would always pull food away from me at lunchtime saying mean, hurtful things like... 'Let go of my sandwich!'". Already at a young age, Little knew he wanted to become a comedian. When Little was 5 years old, he was watching his current inspiration, comedian George Carlin, do a comedy bit on TV when he and his parents were heading to Mackinac Island for a family vacation. Because his parents were asleep, he was able to view this adult-oriented comedy. Little looked back on that experience and thought to himself, "That's [comedy is] what I want to do the rest of my life."

== Education ==
Little went to Central Michigan University in Mount Pleasant, Michigan where he earned a Bachelor of Science degree in Business Administration majoring in M.I.S. (Management Information Systems). He also has an associate degree in Data Processing from Delta College in Bay City, Michigan.

== Career ==
=== Before comedy ===
After graduating with a degree in business and information sciences, Little has had several jobs. Before comedy, he worked for General Motors in Detroit, Kmart in Troy, Michigan, and IBM in Dearborn, Michigan. At IBM, Little was a computer programmer. Though this position was lucrative, Rob stated that it was not for him. He was fired from IBM due to an all-company email that he sent which read, "If you aren't happy here, quit your job and follow your dream." Little viewed this as a blessing in disguise because it was after this moment in 1998 that he started becoming a relevant player in the world of comedy.

=== Stand-up and acting ===
Little is well known throughout the United States for his stand-up and sketch comedy routines. He was a regular sketch comedy artist on The Best Damn Sports Show Period and made appearances on other shows such as Last Call with Carson Daly, Strictly Sex with Dr. Drew, as well as having won $25,000 on CBS's Fire Me...Please.

He has also appeared in many commercials, such as for Snickers and Chemistry.com. In November 2011, Little was featured on Comedy Central’s original series Nick Swardson's Pretend Time as well as "Who Wants to Date a Comedian?." As of 2026, he has filmed five comedy specials and has performed over 360 shows on cruise ships.

=== Mention ===
Once described to as "a Bald Chris Farley with a smack of Jack Black," Rob responded "I don't mind being bald, look at all the money I save... by not going on dates." Rob Little has established himself as one of the funniest, most progressive, new comedians in the country. Little states on his website that entertainment bookers call him “The Future of comedy with more contagious energy than the Energizer Bunny.” The Detroit Free Press selected Little as Michigan's “Best up and Coming Comedian." He has been a finalist in both the Seattle and San Francisco International Comedy Competition. He was also selected as a feature performer at the Chicago Comedy Festival along with the Boston Comedy and Movie Festival. Maxim magazine awarded him the title "Real Man of Comedy of 2007." NBC's Last Comic Standing (on which he's appeared, but wasn't competing) tagged Little as the "happiest comedian in America." He doesn't call himself that, but wouldn't argue with it.

=== DVD releases ===
==== Born: 20 Inches Long ====
Born: 20 Inches Long is Little's first independent released DVD featuring comedy recorded live from Joey's Comedy Club in Livonia, Michigan. It is roughly 40 minutes long and was also released in CD format.

==== Rob Little Haulin' Ass ====
Little's second independent released DVD, called Haulin' Ass, was released in 2006. It features one of Little's comedy shows recorded live at JD's Comedy Café in Milwaukee, Wisconsin, and is roughly 55 minutes. It was also released in CD format.
