= Jungle Moon Men =

1955 American film

- Theatrical release poster
- Directed by: Charles S. Gould
- Screenplay by: Jo Pagano; Dwight Babcock
- Story by: Jo Pagano
- Based on: Jungle Jim; 1934-1954 comic strip by Don Moore and Alex Raymond
- Produced by: Sam Katzman
- Starring: Johnny Weissmuller; Jean Byron; Myron Healey
- Cinematography: Henry Freulich
- Edited by: Henry Batista
- Music by: Mischa Bakaleinikoff
- Production company: Columbia Pictures
- Distributed by: Columbia Pictures
- Release date: April 1955
- Running time: 70 minutes
- Country: United States
- Language: English

Jungle Moon Men is a 1955 American adventure film, the fifteenth film in a series of jungle-based adventures from Columbia Pictures starring Johnny Weissmuller, the first thirteen of which feature the comic strip character Jungle Jim. It is the second of three films featuring Weismuller as an idealized version of himself, clearly based on the Jungle Jim character. The film was directed by Charles S. Gould and written by Dwight Babcock and Jo Pagano.

The film centres on jungle roamer Johnny Weissmuller and his team attempting to rescue an acquaintance in the jungle of Baku, which is inhabited by "moon men" worshipping an apparent Moon Goddess. Filming took place in May 1954 in California. It was theatrically released in the United States in April 1955.

== Plot ==
Adventurer Johnny Weissmuller (playing himself) is hired by Egyptian archaeologist Ellen Marsten (Jean Byron) to traverse the African jungle of Baku. They seek to rescue an acquaintance, Marro (Benjamin F. Chapman Jr.), from his captors, pygmies known as the "Moon Men". The Moon Men are devoted to the Moon Goddess Oma (Helen Stanton), who is apparently an immortal whose only weakness is sunlight. Marro is chosen to be Oma's chief religious official.

After being joined by Marsten's friend Bob Prentice (Bill Henry), the team of Weissmuller, Marstern, and Prentice, set off for Baku. They find Marro and urge him to escape. However, he dies the moment he steps outside the perimeter of the jungle. Interrogating a pygmy Damu (Billy Curtis), Weissmuller learns that Marro was fed a voodoo potion that would kill him once he tried to escape Baku. Just then, the Moon Men overpower the team and capture them. Prentice is selected to take over Marro's position, while Weissmuller and Marstern are brought to Oma's temple.

There, they are stopped by Santo (Myron Healey) and his right-hand man Max (Frank Sully). The evil duo command Weissmuller to lead them into the temple. They meet Oma and also find loads of precious stones in the building. Knowing that not everybody can leave Baku, Weissmuller sacrifices himself for the rest. He asks Prentice to contact the police as soon as he gets to the mainland. Santo pockets a large amount of the jewels and turns to flee. The Moon Men stop him, letting loose a pride of vicious lions. Santo and Max are gorily killed, while the rest manage to escape.

With not much time left, Weissmuller requests for Oma to reveal a fast exit route from Baku. She reluctantly tells him but crumbles into fine dust after being dragged by the explorer to the sunny open. After returning to civilisation, Prentice kvetches about the absence of any evidence to prove Baku's existence. However, Weissmuller's pet chimpanzee Kimba (Rory Mallinson) is shown to have taken a diamond pendant with him.

== Cast ==
- Johnny Weissmuller as himself
- Jean Byron as Ellen Marsten
- Helene Stanton as Oma (credited as Helen Stanton)
- William Henry as Bob Prentice (credited as Bill Henry)
- Myron Healey as Mark Santo
- Billy Curtis as Damu
- Michael Granger as Nolimo
- Frank Sully as Max
- Ben Chapman as Marro (credited as Benjamin F. Chapman Jr.)
- K.L. Smith as Link (credited as Kenneth L. Smith)
- Ed Hinton as Regan

== Production ==
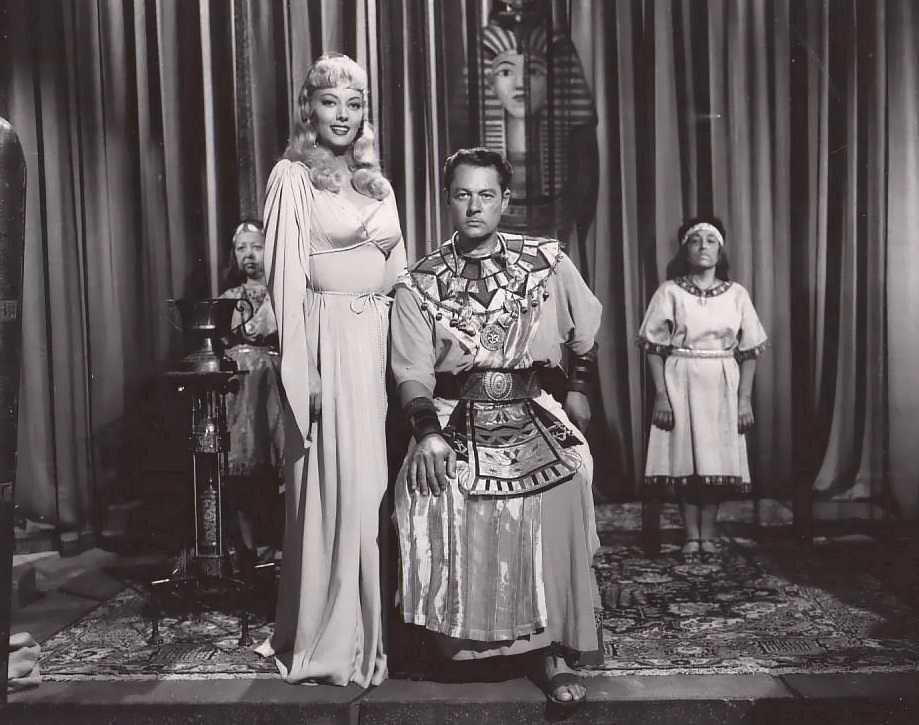
Promotional photograph taken in 1954 showing actors Helene Stanton and William Henry

Johnny Weissmuller played himself, as a protagonist jungle adventurer. It was his second time doing so. (Note: Weissmuller played Jungle Jim for thirteen films chronologically. After which for the remaining three Jungle Jim films, the character was renamed to Johnny Weissmuller due to copyright issues.) Elements from the film's plot were taken from H. Rider Haggard's She: A History of Adventure (1887).

While still a work-in-progress, the film was referred to as simply Moon Men. It was directed by Charles S. Gould with assistance from Eddie Saeta. Sam Katzman was in charge of production for Columbia Pictures, while Jo Pagano and Dwight Babcock wrote the screenplay based on a story by Pagano. Henry Freulich signed on as cinematographer. The set decorator was Sidney Clifford. Mischa Bakaleinikoff headed the musical direction, and Henry Batista edited the film. Filming locations included Iverson and Corriganville. Principal photography was completed in about a week's time. It officially began on May 19, 1954, and ended on May 25, 1954. Archived footage from a preceding Jungle Jim film, Jungle Manhunt (1951), was featured in Jungle Moon Men.

== Release ==
The film was officially released in the United States in April 1955. A reviewer for the magazine Variety wrote that it "fits into the past offerings in the Sam Katzman series and should do the same type of biz in program situations". The Hollywood Reporter's review criticised it for being "negligently written and executed". In evaluating the film in his 2012 book Columbia Pictures Movie Series, 1926—1955: The Harry Cohn Years, Gene Blottner praised Gould's directorial effort, as well as the fine cinematography and "superb" lighting. He stated that the film was "far-fetched" in its plot yet "isn't dull".

== Bibliography ==
- Gene Blottner (2012). Columbia Pictures Movie Series, 1926—1955: The Harry Cohn Years. McFarland. ISBN 978-0-7864-3353-7.
- Michael R. Pitts (2010). Columbia Pictures Horror, Science Fiction and Fantasy Films, 1928—1982. McFarland. ISBN 978-0-7864-5766-3.

== See also ==
- List of American films of 1955
