= VIP medicine =

Effect of wealth or celebrity status on healthcare

VIP medicine is a variety of the VIP syndrome—the phenomenon of a perceived "VIP" (very important person) using his or her status to influence a given professional or institution to make unorthodox decisions under the pressure or presence of said VIP—that relates to the accessibility and quality of health care. It is essentially health care in which a physician or hospital accommodates a wealthy, important or famous patient who can afford to pay the full medical bill outright, usually with luxury amenities, and seclusion from the ordinary run of patient, as added benefits. As a result, such a patient may receive something other than the normal standard of care; the deviation may be in the direction of either greater or lesser safety and quality.

VIP medicine may be initially reflected in expedited care in an emergency room or more immediate and direct access to specialists, bypassing primary care providers. A "VIP suite", or "wing", is one venue where VIP medicine may be practiced in the hospital setting—indeed, whole floors of a hospital building, at major medical centers, may be dedicated to it. A particular type of formalized and regularized VIP medical practice is known as concierge medicine. Many aspects of medical tourism overlap with VIP medicine.

High-profile individuals typically receiving VIP medical treatment include prominent and powerful politicians, royals and aristocrats, the super-rich (including corporate executives), entertainment and sports celebrities, and eminent or famous medical people themselves. The families or relatives of these types of people are also apt to receive special medical treatment.

== Etymology ==
The term VIP syndrome is thought to have been coined in 1964 when Maryland psychiatrist Walter Weintraub reported that his hospital had been thrown into turmoil as staff there struggled to respond to the relentless demands of influential patients and their relatives. In addition to the turmoil, Weintraub was particularly concerned by the large number of "therapeutic failures" (10 of 12) among the patients in his series. A high rate of signing-out of the hospital against medical advice was a notable attendant problem.

== Motivation ==
Prominent people desire instant and ample medical care. Additionally, they want to avoid public scrutiny in matters of private medical care, and may demand special accommodations on this basis. They avoid the journalists as well as the onlookers among the hospital staff. They desire privacy for an extra security. Often the pressure on medical staff for special accommodations comes from a VIP's entourage rather than from the patient.

Medical personnel are also not immune to becoming fascinated by the presence of a celebrity or powerful figure. Physicians and hospitals may relish the extra revenue accruing from the treatment of VIP patients, sometimes in the form of lavish donations, and so may accommodate them accordingly. Some wealthy patients are not above gifting individual providers lavishly in hopes of easier accommodation of their needs, a situation that creates a conflict of interest when specific requests may be counter to a patient's welfare.

== VIP wards ==
Often characterized by walnut-paneled rooms and high-thread-count bed sheets, VIP accommodations at large hospitals have traditionally inspired special, sometimes sarcastic, nicknames such as "the Gold Coast" and "Millionaires' Row". Examples include the labor and delivery ward at Lenox Hill Hospital in New York City, known as the "Beyoncé Rooms".

== Criticisms ==
A number of criticisms have been leveled at the practice of VIP medicine. These can be broadly categorized as focusing on issues of fairness (elitism), economy (wastefulness), and safety (lax standards).

- Hospitals and doctors aiming to give some patients more medical care, more time, and more resources contradicts fundamental medical ethics. It may not be consistent with the idea of justice within medicine: a fair distribution of scarce resources.
- VIP medicine can be extravagant and wasteful. Excessive drug prescriptions may be written and imaging studies ordered. Some health care programs for corporate executives, for example, involve periodic full-body CT scans as screening tests as part of the "chairman's physical", a measure considered entirely unjustified as routine care. Overmedication may result. Imaging tests may actually increase the risk of cancer from radiation exposure and have never really been shown to improve anyone's health. And if there is an incidental finding, as there often is, more tests might be ordered, which may lead to unnecessary biopsies.
- A VIP may insist on the senior-most specialist at an academic institution or teaching hospital—the chair of the department of medicine, or of surgery, for instance. But the senior-most, or most eminent, caregiver is not necessarily the most skilled at performing a given procedure. Such an individual may be out of practice, or no longer up-to-date, and the "no name" subordinate may actually be much more skilled.
- In their haste to attend to a VIP without stint, star-struck administrators, doctors and nurses may, in their distraction and flustration, provide substandard care. (A case in point was when former President Gerald Ford was discharged from the hospital with the diagnosis of an inner-ear infection when, in fact, he had suffered a stroke.) Many VIP wings are physically removed some distance from the rest of the hospital; in the case of a "code", such as a cardiac arrest in the VIP area, staff may be dangerously far away. Even proper routine staffing with the appropriate specialist nursing care (cardiac nurses, orthopedic nurses, etc.) may not get all the way out to an exceptional, isolated patient.
- VIPs also have particular issues with privacy because everyone is interested in their health and may compromise confidentiality when managing medical records and studies.
- Medical personnel may acquiesce to a VIP's unorthodox requests, even when doing so represents a breach of standards or is frankly dangerous to other patients. Although a Middle Eastern royal at Boston's Brigham and Women's Hospital had a drug-resistant infection, nurses and physicians there in 2014 complied when he asked that they not wear protective gowns because he felt the gowns implied that he was "dirty", which he found offensive. Doctors and staff may unconsciously act to please the VIP patient by avoiding unpleasant historical or social details germane to their history. VIPs may be prescribed narcotics or other controlled substances when an ordinary patient would be denied them, or they may be overmedicated with larger amounts of such drugs than appropriate. In sum, deviating from the standard of care to accommodate VIP care may result in worse outcomes.
- In extreme cases, an unusually powerful VIP may create an extraordinary network of irregular medical services involving a number of providers over an extended period of time. This scenario can lead to a system of perverse incentives involving covert referrals, treatment under false (or no) patient names, "complicated financial horse-trading" and other abuses that run afoul not only of medical ethics, but violate the law. A notable example is the "small stable" of physicians maintained by Jeffrey Epstein.

== Proposed remediations ==
Some medical institutions have drafted innovative policy directed at correcting some of the excesses of VIP medicine. In 2011, the Cleveland Clinic's Jorge Guzman published nine principles of caring for VIPs in the Cleveland Clinic Journal of Medicine, warning staff against bending the rules, accepting lavish gifts, and automatically bringing in department chairs to care for a patient rather than a lower-ranking physician who might actually be more expert in treating a particular ailment. In 2015, the Mayo Clinic of Minnesota instituted policy stipulating that personal gifts to staff in excess of $25 value cannot be accepted and must be forwarded to the development office.

== Notable medical VIP suites, wards, and floors ==
- The Pavilion at Brigham and Women's Hospital, Boston.
- The Phillips House at Massachusetts General Hospital, Boston.
- McKeen Pavilion at NewYork–Presbyterian Hospital, New York City "A waterfall, a grand piano and the image of a giant orchid grace the soaring ninth floor atrium of McKeen...(where) afternoon tea is served daily"
- The Medical Executive Treatment Unit (METU) at the Walter Reed National Military Medical Center (WRNMMC), Bethesda, Maryland

== Notable practitioners of VIP medicine ==
- Max Jacobson, physician to 1950s and '60s celebrities; known as "Dr Feelgood"
- Matthew D. Mann, gynecologist who performed surgery on President William McKinley after the President was shot
- Theodor Morell, Adolf Hitler's personal physician
- Bruce Moskowitz, Palm Beach physician referred to by Jeffrey Epstein as "internist to the world's wealthy"
- Conrad Murray, Michael Jackson's personal physician
- George C. Nichopoulos, Elvis Presley's personal physician
