= Mark Young =

Mark Young may refer to:

- Mark Aitchison Young (1886–1974), British administrator, governor of Hong Kong just before and after World War II
- Mark Young (basketball), American basketball player
- Mark Young (wrestler) (1967–2016), American wrestler
- Mark L. Young (born 1991), American actor
- Mark A. Young (born 1969), California judge
- Mark Young (Canadian football), Canadian football player
- S. Mark Young, business professor
- Mark Young (1987–2009), motorcycle racer who died at the North West 200 in 2009
- Mark Young, bassist for Hed PE
