= Against medical advice =

Event when patient leaves before care ends

Against medical advice (AMA), sometimes known as discharge against medical advice (DAMA), is a term used in health care institutions when a patient leaves a hospital against the advice of their doctor. While leaving before a medically specified endpoint may not promote the patient's health above their other values, there is widespread ethical and legal consensus that competent patients (or their authorized surrogates) are entitled to decline recommended treatment.

The available data suggests that in general, patients discharged AMA have an increased risk of hospital readmission, and potentially death. This data however, describes groups of patients discharged AMA, and therefore should not necessarily be applied to an individual patient wishing to leave AMA, and who may have different clinical circumstances and risks.

Although common hospital practice for an AMA discharge involves the patient being asked to sign a form stating that they are aware that they are leaving the facility AMA, the hospital is generally not legally required to use it. Rather, the legal and ethical requirement is that the authorized health care professional has an informed consent discussion with the patient regarding their choice to leave the hospital before it has been recommended. This discussion which includes disclosure of the risks, benefits, and alternatives to hospitalization, as well as the patient's understanding, should be documented in the patient's chart. Many physicians incorrectly believe that insurance denies payment for the hospitalization of patients leaving AMA, leaving such patients financially responsible. This "pervasive 'medical urban legend'" may lead to ethical problems, as it "scare[s] patients with misleading information" about their exposure to costs, leading to a "breakdown in the patient–doctor relationship" and an infringement of patient autonomy.

Authors across numerous disciplines have begun to question the wisdom of the practice of designating a discharge as AMA, as it does not follow professional standards, lacks evidence of its utility to improve patient care, and may harm patients by reducing their likelihood of following up. Finally, there is widespread ethical consensus that even when patients decline recommended treatment, health care professionals still have a duty to care for and support patients.

The limited research in this area has led to a stagnation in effective interventions designed to alleviate AMA discharges. Multiple retrospective studies examining AMA discharges over the last 4 decades have attempted to identify risk factors in order to develop interventions to reduce the likelihood of AMA discharges in the future. The majority of studies have identified patient risk factors for AMA discharges that included low socioeconomic status, history of a substance use disorder, and male sex. No studies have yet attempted to identify physician factors that increase the risk of an AMA discharge. More research is needed to understand this practice and intervene effectively in a patient-centered fashion.

== Statistics ==
In the United States, the total number of stays discharged AMA increased 41 percent between 1997 and 2011. For adults ages 45–64 years, the percentage of AMA discharges increased from 27 percent in 1997 to 41 percent in 2011. By payer, the share of AMA discharges increased from 25 percent to 29 percent for Medicare and decreased from 21 percent to 16 percent for private insurance.

== See also ==
- VIP medicine
