= New Orleans Uncensored =

1955 film by William Castle

- Theatrical release poster
- Directed by: William Castle
- Written by: Orville H. Hampton; Lewis Meltzer
- Produced by: Sam Katzman
- Starring: Arthur Franz; Beverly Garland
- Cinematography: Henry Freulich
- Edited by: Al Clark; Gene Havlick
- Color process: Black and white
- Production company: Columbia Pictures
- Distributed by: Columbia Pictures
- Release date: April 30, 1955
- Running time: 76 minutes
- Country: United States
- Language: English

New Orleans Uncensored is a 1955 American film noir crime film directed by William Castle and starring Arthur Franz and Beverly Garland.

== Plot ==
The docks of New Orleans, Louisiana are controlled by Zero Saxon, a notorious racketeer. When former naval officer Dan Corbett arrives in town, wanting to open a shipping business of his own, he accepts a job working for Saxon to make some money, unaware of how corrupt Saxon's operation is.

Longshoremen's union representative Jack Petty and his girlfriend Alma Mae are impressed by Dan when he flattens a drunk who has been annoying her. They help arrange a job for Dan through Saxon's dock manager, Joe Reilly, whose wife Marie then invites Dan to dinner and introduces him to her brother, Scrappy Durant, a former prizefighter.

Joe is killed by Saxon's thugs to keep him from informing on the illegal activities at the docks. Marie admits she has been expecting this to happen. Dan goes undercover, trying to help the New Orleans police investigate. Due to a misunderstanding, Scrappy attacks him in a boxing ring and Dan accidentally kills him with a punch. Dan is then beaten by Saxon's men, but with Alma and Marie's help, he is able to assist the police in placing Saxon under arrest.

== Cast ==
- Arthur Franz as Dan Corbett
- Beverly Garland as Marie Reilly
- Helene Stanton as Alma Mae
- Michael Ansara as Zero Saxon
- Stacy Harris as Scrappy Durant
- Mike Mazurki as Big Mike
- William Henry as Joe Reilly
- Michael Granger as Jack Petty
- Frankie Ray as Deuce
- Ed Nelson as Charlie (as Edward Stafford Nelson)
- Al Chittenden as himself, President, General Longshore Workers, Local 1418, ILA
- Joseph L. Scheuering as himself, Superintendent of Police, City of New Orleans
- Victor Schiro as himself, Senior Councilman, City of New Orleans
- Howard L. Dey as himself, Fire Chief, City of New Orleans
- Pete Herman as himself
- Ralph Dupas as himself
- Judge Walter B. Hamlin as Wayne Brandon

== Reception ==
The New York Times called it an "undistinguished" film with a "standard, banal story".

== See also ==
- List of American films of 1955
