= Larry Stewart Leadership and Inspiration Award =

- Awarded for: Leadership and inspiration in addressing drug, alcohol, tobacco, and mental health issues through entertainment
- Country: United States
- Presented by: Entertainment Industries Council
- Reward: Presented at the PRISM Awardst
- First award: 1997

The Larry Stewart Leadership and Inspiration Award is awarded by the Entertainment Industries Council at the PRISM Awards to an entertainment industry professional for leading and inspiring the industry to make a difference on drug, alcohol, tobacco, and/or mental health issues. The award is named in the memory of veteran writer/producer/director Larry Stewart.

Larry Stewart Leadership and Inspiration Award
Year	Name
1997	Dick Wolf, Mariette Hartley
1998	Michele Lee, Stan Lee
1999	Suzanne Somers, Montel Williams, Michael Greene
2000	Arnold Shapiro, Martin Sheen, Leeza Gibbons
2001	NBC Television Network
2002	
2003	Dick Askin
2004	Mindy Herman
2005	Gerald McRaney
2006	Neal Baer
2007	Kevin Reilly
2008	Drew Pinsky
