= Rumble on the Docks =

1956 film by Fred F. Sears

- Directed by: Fred F. Sears
- Screenplay by: Lou Morheim; Jack DeWitt
- Based on: Rumble on the Docks by Frank Paley
- Produced by: Sam Katzman
- Starring: James Darren; Laurie Carroll; Michael Granger; Robert Blake
- Cinematography: Benjamin H. Kline
- Edited by: Jerome Thoms
- Color process: Black and white
- Production company: Clover Productions
- Distributed by: Columbia Pictures
- Release date: December 1956
- Running time: 82 minutes
- Country: United States
- Language: English

Rumble on the Docks is a 1956 American crime film noir directed by Fred F. Sears and starring James Darren, Laurie Carroll, Michael Granger and Robert Blake. The film was based on the novel of the same title by Frank Paley. It was produced by Sam Katzman for release by Columbia Pictures.

== Plot ==
Jimmy Smigelski, living near the docks of Brooklyn, is quick to help when a neighborhood girl, Della, and her little brother are menaced by some thugs. Joe Brindo, a racketeer Jimmy's honest father Pete blames for an incident that crippled him, is impressed by Jimmy and takes him under his wing.

Jimmy is caught in a rivalry between two local gangs. He also is asked to testify at a trial, angering his father when the outcome benefits the gangster. Jimmy eventually changes his ways and ends up working in his father's print shop.

== Cast ==
- James Darren as Jimmy Smigelski
- Laurie Carroll as Della
- Michael Granger as Joe Brindo
- Jerry Janger as Rocky
- Robert Blake as Chuck
- Edgar Barrier as Pete Smigelski
- Celia Lovsky as Anna Smigelski
- David Bond as Dan Kevlin
- Timothy Carey as Frank Mangus
- Dan Terranova as 'Stomper' Tony Lightning
- Barry Froner as Poochie
- Don Devlin as Wimpy
- Stephen H. Sears as Cliffie
- Joseph Vitale as Ferd Marchesi
- David Orrick McDearmon as Lawyer Gotham (as David Orrick)
- Larry J. Blake as Officer Fitz
- Robert C. Ross as Gil Danco
- Steve Warren as Sully
- Don Garrett as Bo-Bo
- Joel Ashley as Dist. Atty. Fuller
- Salvatore Anthony as Kid with Wallet
- Freddie Bell as Himself, Freddie Bell (as Freddie Bell and His Bellboys)
- The Bellboys as Themselves, The Bellboys (as Freddie Bell and His Bellboys)

== Production ==
The film was based on the eponymous 1953 novel by "Frank Paley", a social worker writing under a pseudonym. The New York Times thought "Mr Paley's narrative powers are not up to his descriptive ones."

Sam Katzman bought the film rights in 1955.

The lead role was given to James Darren, who had recently been signed to a long-term contract by Columbia. It was his first movie. Katzman also introduced newcomers Laurie Carroll and Sal Anthony. Carroll was discovered by Katzman when she appeared on The Johnny Carson Show.

Filming started 18 June 1956.

== Release ==
James Darren later said of the movie, "Fred Sears was a wonderful director. That really was my first break because I started getting 400-500 letters a month from that film. You're not talking about a major film here. So, that kind of put me on a different level at the studio and they took notice."
