= Pamela Burton =

American architect

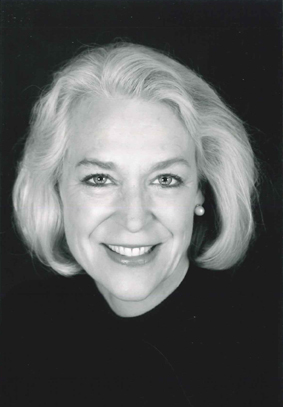
- Portrait of Pamela Burton
- Born: Pamela Grace Burton; September 16, 1948 (age 78); Santa Monica, California, U.S.
- Education: University of California, Los Angeles
- Occupations: Principal, President of Pamela Burton & Company, Landscape Architect, Author
- Years active: 1975–present
- Organization: Fellow American Society of Landscape Architects The Cultural Landscape Foundation Stewardship Council
- Notable work: Pamela Burton Landscapes and Private Landscapes: Modernist Gardens in Southern California
- Website: www.pamelaburtonco.com

Pamela Grace Burton (born September 16, 1948) is a landscape architect known for her interdisciplinary approach to private and public projects, bringing together plant materials, art, and architecture. In 2006 she became a fellow of the American Society of Landscape Architects (ASLA).

== Education and philosophy ==
Burton was born in Santa Monica, California. She earned a bachelor's degree in Environmental Design and a Master's of Architecture from University of California, Los Angeles (UCLA) in 1975.

While attending UCLA, Burton worked at ACE Gallery and participated in the installation of earth-work artists, including Robert Smithson and Michael Heizer. Helping to construct Sol LeWitt’s ephemeral wall drawings, she was inspired by the way the colors overlapped. Likewise, Robert Irwin’s scrim pieces and Elyn Zimmerman’s observations of nature through photography, graphite drawings, and stone and water environments informed her about working with light, space, and perception.She has characterized landscape design as a process that emphasizes the experience of the site rather than the finished product. In her practice, she prioritizes the cultivation of awareness to better incorporate unexpected or spontaneous elements that arise during the design process.

Burton's awareness of architecture and landscape as complementary forms of the same process was confirmed when she took time off from studying at UCLA to visit Japan. There, in the gardens and temples, she observed the power of aesthetic simplicity and experienced the fusion of nature and architecture. “I like to think of the garden and landscape in the context of a big idea.”

To demonstrate how modernist ideas were embedded in the mid-century gardens and houses of A. Quincy Jones, Joseph van der Kar, John Lautner, Richard Neutra, Rudolph Schindler, and many more, Burton wrote, with Marie Botnick and Kathryn Smith, the book Private Landscapes: Modernist Gardens in Southern California.

Throughout Burton's career she has been influenced and informed by where she lived — the hills of Malibu and the valley of Ojai. She learned repeatedly that the success and value of spaces are not always seen immediately; they are felt. Many defining edges and threshold meetings can go into making a space resonant: proportions of inside and outside, light and shadow, nature and cultivation, social needs and solitude. Her living spaces became places to experiment and explore by instinct; if she fell, she didn't hurt herself. She replanted. “Burton’s own garden has developed around her favorite themes: formal outdoor rooms casually appointed, flowing water, the wild world seen beyond the garden, the use of plants to narrate a human story.”

In the end, a garden takes on its own layers of time and meaning, and Burton does not feel she needs to spell them out completely. “I’m passionate about places that resonate, about places that make you think and long and remember.”

== Professional practice ==
Pamela Burton's projects include private residences and public landscapes in California, Idaho, New Mexico, New York, Australia, Brazil, and Japan. They include campus master plans, institutional buildings and plazas, commercial developments, high-rise office towers, high-rise residential condominiums, reservoirs for the Los Angeles Department of Water and Power, United States courthouses, embassies, hospitals, libraries, and parks. “If we act responsibly and come to our senses, we can contribute to the balance and well-being of nature. Plants provide beauty and satisfaction. By giving back to the earth, we’re making our own lives richer. The way we treat our landscapes is the way we treat ourselves.”

Early projects like The Bonhill Residence show the importance of adopting a strong design that accommodates change over time. The Colton Avenue Streetscape for the University of Redlands was important for the way it helped to assimilate the campus with the surrounding community. The Cantitoe Farm project relied on ideas related to creating in-between, terraced garden rooms that could be inhabited. For the Calabasas Civic Center, the concentration was on building attractive, sustainable spaces for the community. Asked by Dwell to critique outdoor furniture, “Burton visited several Los Angeles retailers. Her distinctive approach to analyzing each piece was both insightful and playful (she often lingers on the sound of things, particularly names, and whimsically forgoes English for Spanish.”

Many projects incorporate native California plants and have water and the conservation of water as primary to their designs. The Palm Canyon Residence in Malibu is designed as a comfortable refuge for a large family; it incorporates a pepper tree alee, olive grove, and planted steps. The School of the Arts Plaza, for the University of California, Irvine project with Maya Lin, has become a central meeting place as well as an exploration of our five senses. Red Tail Ranch in Santa Ynez relies ultimately on natural rainfall for its timeless oak grassland. The Santa Monica Public Library uses water as its primary metaphor and includes shallow pools in the middle of the courtyard to provide relief from hot summer days. Burton’s work has focused on the use of native and drought-tolerant vegetation. At the Santa Monica Public Library, she implemented a 200,000-gallon underground cistern to collect rainwater for irrigation.

Recent projects pare down landscape to its essence, with a clear hierarchy of spaces that simplifies the overall structure and can be complemented by a rich palette of plant materials. La Mesa Residence integrates a series of small courts with their adjacent spaces: library, dining, study, and living. At the Colorado Center, Burton brought to life an office complex by enhancing and rethinking its context. At the East Fork Residence, at an elevation of seven thousand feet, Burton anchored the house to structural terraces planted with flowering crab apple trees and created veils of native trees through which to view the house. In São Paulo, she created multiple refuges for office workers and the public. In all of this work, the intention was to create layers of discovery and experience. Referring to Burton's work on Hesperides in Montecito, Donna Dorian writes, “That the house and garden have made such a brilliant transition into the new millennium has much to do with the prodigious talent of Santa Monica landscape architect Pamela Burton.”

She served for six years on the Design Review Board at the University of California, Santa Barbara, three years on the Design Review Board of the University of California, Riverside and three years on the Architectural Review Board of the city of Santa Monica.

== Relationship with the environment ==
During her undergraduate years at the University of California, Los Angeles (UCLA), when she studies, she found that what she wants most was to create a landscape, and by changing the landscape to achieve the best use of the site, and it also related to the environment. Then, she noticed that “elements such as openings, lighting, temperature (shade and water), sounds, and furnishing also can be considered as a good way to show the relationship with its surroundings.”

Later, at the time during her study in Japan, by visiting the gardens and temples, she observed that the power of aesthetic simplicity and experienced the way in which the fusion of nature and architecture connected her to something infinite and deep. After that, she realized how she wants to approach these qualities to her own work. So, merge into the boundary of the space is important to Pamela, and later when she designs her work, she always strove to study the site and its environment.

Throughout her career, she has emphasized a balance between four areas of the creative process: looking, thinking, drawing, and making. She has described "thinking" as the analysis of conceptual connections within an environment, while "drawing" is characterized as a method for recording insights and translating imaginative concepts onto paper. Her work frequently incorporates elements of the natural environment. For example, Red Tail Ranch is a project located in a California landscape characterized by oak savanna and hills. To integrate the structure into the natural environment, the design follows the topography of the land, utilizing a ridge line as a central axis. The project was designed to minimize its visual impact, allowing the structure align with the landscape and the mountains.

In the book “Pamala Burton Landscapes “there shows many of her projects, and most of them show the relationship with the environment.

== Selected projects ==
- 2016 LUMINA, San Francisco, California
- 2016 Glendale Central Air Terminal, Glendale, California
- 2015 Anita May Rosentein LGBT Center, Hollywood, California
- 2012 Archer School for Girls, Los Angeles, California
- 2011 The Century, Century City, California
- 2010 Valley Performing Arts Center, California State University, Northridge
- 2009 São Paulo Rochavera Esplanade, São Paulo, Brazil
- 2006 Farmer's Market, Third and Fairfax, Los Angeles, California
- 2005 Santa Monica Public Library, Santa Monica, California
- 2004 Colorado Center, Santa Monica, California
- 1998 Gilbert Residence, Brentwood, California
- 1997 Colton Avenue Street Scape, University of Redlands, Redlands, California
- 1995 Art Science Walk, Scripps College, Claremont, California
- 1994 Escondido Performing Arts Center, Escondido, California
- 1992 Biddy Mason Park, Los Angeles, California (Burton and Spitz)
- 1976 Nilsson Residence
- 1975 Jencks Residence

== Bibliography ==
- Private Landscapes (2014), Princeton Architectural Press, ISBN 978-1-61689-161-9
- Pamela Burton Landscapes (2010), Princeton Architectural Press, ISBN 978-1-56898-965-5
- Burton, Pamela, and Kathryn Smith. Private Landscapes: Modernist Gardens in Southern California. New York: Princeton Architectural, 2014.
