= Dr. Drew On Call =

American television series

- Starring: Drew Pinsky
- Country of origin: United States

Production
- Production locations: CNN Studio, Los Angeles, California
- Running time: 60 minutes

Original release
- Network: HLN (April 4, 2011–September 22, 2016); CNN Philippines (March 17, 2015–February 6, 2016)
- Release: April 4, 2011 – September 22, 2016

Dr. Drew On Call, previously titled Dr. Drew, is an American current affairs program hosted by Drew Pinsky that aired on Monday through Thursday nights on HLN. The program premiered on April 4, 2011. HLN canceled the series on August 25, 2016, with the series finale airing on September 22, 2016.

CNN Philippines formerly aired Dr. Drew seven days a week at 11 PM local time.

== See also ==
- Jane Velez-Mitchell
- Nancy Grace
