= The Battle of Rogue River =

1954 film

Battle of Rogue River
- Original film poster
- Directed by: William Castle
- Written by: Douglas Heyes
- Produced by: Sam Katzman
- Starring: George Montgomery; Martha Hyer; Richard Denning
- Cinematography: Henry Freulich
- Edited by: Charles Nelson
- Color process: Technicolor
- Production company: Sam Katzman Productions
- Distributed by: Columbia Pictures
- Release date: March 1, 1954
- Running time: 71 minutes
- Country: United States
- Language: English
- Budget: Unknown

Battle of Rogue River is a 1954 American Western film starring George Montgomery, Martha Hyer, and Richard Denning, directed by William Castle and produced by Sam Katzman. The screenplay is written by Douglas Heyes. It is set during the Rogue River Wars in the Oregon Territory but features the standard costumes of a post American Civil War western and was filmed on the Newhall Ranch, California.

== Plot ==
In the Oregon Territory prior to the American Civil War, Chief Mike (Michael Granger) has fought the US Army and the white settlers to a standstill. As a result, the post commander Major Wallach (Willis Bouchey) is replaced by Major Archer (George Montgomery). On the way to the fort, Major Archer's troop of cavalry accompanied by two field guns spot an ambush by Chief Mike's Indians. Major Archer orders one of the guns to fire, knocking down a tree and panicking the "braves", who suffer no casualties.

On arrival at the Fort, Major Wallach has allowed the use of his barracks to recruit more Irregulars for Stacey Wyatt (Richard Denning) who accompany the regulars on their military expeditions. As the recruiting involves free alcohol and kisses by women to the volunteers (and to their Regular comrades-in-arms) Major Archer is furious and immediately takes command of the post to reinstall military discipline, retrain the men and plan another expedition. No one is more outraged than Sergeant Major McClain's (Emory Parnell) daughter Brett (Martha Hyer) who thinks Archer inhuman.

An emissary of Chief Mike comes to arrange a meeting between the new commander to discuss peace but Major Archer initially refuses until orders come for him to negotiate with the Indians. The Major and Chief meet with each respecting each other and arranging a thirty-day truce with the Indians and whites not crossing either side of the Rogue River. A scuffle breaks out, Archer takes Chief Mike hostage, telling the Indians that their Chief will come with him to ensure their safety back to the fort, upon their arrival he will be released. At the fort, the civilians want to hang Chief Mike, but Archer keeps his word and has him released.

Wyatt is secretly employed to keep the Indian wars going by a consortium of the territory's business community (mining, ranching, lumber, fur trade) who oppose Statehood that would ruin their profits. Wyatt tricks Sgt Major McClain into breaking the treaty by telling him that a band of renegade Indians have attacked the fort and kidnapped Brett, leading to all but McClain being killed after they attack an Indian settlement in a bid to find her.

A number of hours after McClain's patrol becomes overdue, Wyatt returns to the fort and feigns ignorance to McClain's whereabouts. Major Archer leads a patrol in a bid to find them, on the way they spy smoke signals off in the distance, which Archer identifies as being war signals. Brett appears from some nearby bushes, causing Archer to chastise her for her carelessness, but begrudgingly agrees to take her along with him since he can't spare any men to escort her back to the fort.

At the river bank crossed earlier by McClain, Archer spots the imprints of horse shoes, coming to the incorrect assumption that the Indians opened fire and McClain's unit crossed the river to chase after them. At the Indian camp, a distraught Brett angrily accuses Archer of having deliberately ordered McClain to attack the camp as means of gaining an excuse to restart the conflict. Brett rides off, and Archer chases after her. After catching up with her an arrow narrowly misses Archer.

Brett and Archer flee, with a pair of Indians in hot pursuit, Archer draws his saber and kills them both. Brett and Archer continue to travel through the wilderness, and after spending the night asleep near a river the pair are captured by Chief Mike's braves the following morning. Chief Mike is sorrowful they must meet again under the present circumstances, and returns the favor by cutting their bonds. Chief Mike believes Archer's plea that he had nothing to do with the actions of McClain's forces, but he declares that it matters little, for the tribe has already made the decision to fight, and the other tribes are waiting to follow Chief Mike's example.

Chief Mike sends them back, assuring Archer that the next time they meet will be in a battle to the death. Archer draws up a plan to negate Chief Mike's terrain advantage by using his artillery to fire over the cliffs and hitting his braves behind them. Archer sets up his infantry forces across the river opposite the pass the Indians must exit through. As an Indian war party leaves the pass and starts across the river, the infantry opens fire and drives them back.

A short time later a new attack is mounted, stronger than the first one. The war party successfully manages to cross the river, leading to brutal hand-to-hand and close-range gun and bow and arrow fights. Once again, Archer's men successfully manage to hold their ground, continuing to buy enough time to set up the artillery.

Back at the fort, now manned entirely by Wyatt's volunteers, Matt Parish, a member of the business consortium, expresses concerns to Wyatt about the increasing chance that Archer might be victorious. A wounded McClain then returns to the fort, he tells Brett and the other volunteers the truth, who confront Wyatt. They take him to Archer, Brett informs Archer about what happened. Wyatt tries to convince Archer that McClain is delirious, but it fails. Archer rebukes Wyatt, telling him that since he has betrayed him, the Indians, and now the settlers as well, there would be no place for him to hide, he wouldn't last a day.

Archer takes Wyatt with him to explain the situation to Chief Mike before the artillery opens fire at 9 O'clock. Archer desperately attempts to convince a suspicious Chief Mike to withdraw his forces before they are all killed in the artillery barrage, but Wyatt lies and openly states that Archer ordered the attack in an attempt to convince Chief Mike to reject Archer's efforts at peace. Chief Mike states that it is a custom of his tribe that when the word of a Chief is challenged, the Chief and the challenger must fight to the death, or the Chief is not considered a Chief at all, and arranges for Archer and Wyatt to take part in a trial by combat; the victor is the one they will listen to.

Wyatt initially has the upper hand in the brawl, but Archer narrowly overpowers him and forces him to tell the truth. Archer convinces the Indians to leave the areas, and Wyatt grabs a spear from a nearby Indian and attempts to kill Archer, only to be shot by Chief Mike. Archer, Chief Mike, and the rest of the tribe cross the river, to the cheers of the assembled soldiers and volunteers.

Archer has Matt Parish arrested. The artillery then opens fire, blasting the now abandoned Indian encampment to rubble. Brett starts to congratulate Archer for his victory against Chief Mike, but Archer replies that he has a won a battle, but not against Chief Mike. Brett tells Archer that she was right about him, he is indeed a human being. Chief Mike proclaims Archer an honorable Chief for saving not only his life, but the lives of his tribe; he declares an end to hostilities, giving Archer his rifle as a token of peace.

== Cast ==
- George Montgomery as Major Frank Archer
- Richard Denning as Stacey Wyatt
- Martha Hyer as Brett McClain
- Willis Bouchey as Maj. Wallach
- John Crawford as Captain Richard Hillman
- Emory Parnell as Sergeant Major McClain
- Michael Granger as Chief Mike
- Lee Roberts as Lientenant Keith Ryan
- Bill Bryant as Corporal
- Freeman Morse as Private Reed
- Frank Sully as Private Kohler
- Jimmy Lloyd as Private Hanley
- Charles Evans as Matt Parish
- Steven Ritch as Indian (as Steve Ritch)
