= Michael Granger =

American actor (1923–1981)

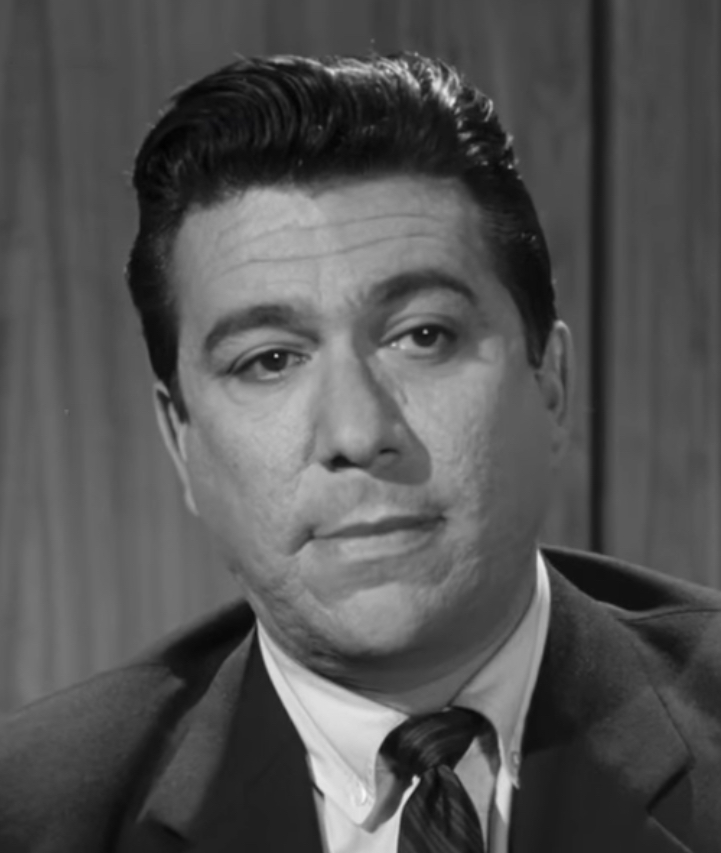
- Granger in Anatomy of a Psycho (1961)
- Born: Milton Grossman; May 14, 1923; Kansas City, Missouri, US
- Died: October 22, 1981 (aged 58); New York City, US
- Occupation: Actor
- Known for: The Big Heat, Creature With The Atom Brain, Fiddler on the Roof

Michael Granger (May 14, 1923 – October 22, 1981) was an American actor.

== Early life ==
Granger was born Milton Grossman in Kansas City, Missouri. He was Jewish.

== Career ==
Granger appeared in The Big Heat and in B movies such as Creature With The Atom Brain. He appeared as well as on TV shows including Rawhide, Kojak, Gunsmoke and The Untouchables. He created the role of Lazar Wolf, the butcher, in the original Broadway production of Fiddler on the Roof in 1964, and can be heard on the original cast album singing L'Chaim with Zero Mostel. He appeared in Henrik Ibsen's A Doll's House at the Vivian Beaumont Theater at Lincoln Center with Liv Ullmann and Sam Waterston in 1975, and was again on Broadway in 1980 in Tennessee Williams' Clothes for a Summer Hotel. Known for his resonant bass speaking voice, in the final years of Granger's life he became a sought-after voiceover actor.

== Death ==
Granger died October 22, 1981, in New York City of heart failure.

== Filmography ==
- Les Misérables (1952) - Policeman (uncredited)
- Hiawatha (1952) - Ajawac
- The Mississippi Gambler (1953) - Poker Player (uncredited)
- Salome (1953) - Captain Quintus (uncredited)
- The Magnetic Monster (1953) - Kenneth Smith
- Fort Vengeance (1953) - Sitting Bull
- Tarzan and the She-Devil (1953) - Philippe Lavarre
- White Witch Doctor (1953) - Paal (uncredited)
- The Robe (1953) - Slave Dealer (uncredited)
- The Big Heat (1953) - Hugo
- The Battle of Rogue River (1954) - Chief Mike
- Siege at Red River (1954) - Officer at Fort (uncredited)
- The Egyptian (1954) - Officer (uncredited)
- The Adventures of Hajji Baba (1954) - Musa (uncredited)
- Sign of the Pagan (1954) - Hun Scout (uncredited)
- Prince of Players (1955) - Protester at Theatre (uncredited)
- New Orleans Uncensored (1955) - Jack Petty
- Jungle Moon Men (1955) - Nolimo
- Cell 2455, Death Row (1955) - John J. 'Johnny' Albert (uncredited)
- Creature with the Atom Brain (1955) - Frank Buchanan
- The Conqueror (1956) - Chieftain #1 (uncredited)
- Mohawk (1956) - Mohawk Priest
- The Harder They Fall (1956) - Gus Dundee's Doctor (uncredited)
- Miami Exposé (1956) - Louis Ascot
- Rumble on the Docks (1956) - Joe Brindo
- Crime of Passion (1957) - Jason, Reporter on Phone (uncredited)
- Calypso Heat Wave (1957) - Barney Pearl
- Looking for Danger (1957) - Sultan Sidi-Omar
- Alfred Hitchcock Presents (1958) (Season 3 Episode 22: "The Return of the Hero") - Francois
- Gunman's Walk (1958) - Curly
- Murder by Contract (1958) - Mr. Moon
- Official Detective US TV series - John 'Chaz' Smallman (1958)
- Pier 5, Havana (1959) - Lieutenant Garcia
- Wake Me When It's Over (1960) - Sergeant (uncredited)
- Anatomy of a Psycho (1961) - Lieutenant Mac
