= Concierge medicine =

Retainer relationship between patient and physician

Concierge medicine, also known as retainer medicine, is a relationship between a patient and a primary care physician in which the patient pays an annual fee or retainer. In exchange for the retainer, doctors agree to provide enhanced care, including commitments to ensure adequate time and availability for each patient.

The practice may also be called membership medicine, cash-only practice, and direct care. While all "concierge" practices share similarities, they vary widely in structure, services provided, and payment requirements. Estimates of U.S. doctors practicing concierge medicine range from fewer than 800 to 5,000.

== Business model ==
There are typically three primary types of concierge medicine business models practiced today. Variations of these models exist, although most models usually fall into one of the following categories.

The Fee for Care ("FFC") is an annual retainer model, where the patient pays a monthly, quarterly, or annual retainer fee to the physician. The retainer fee covers most services provided by the physician in his/her office. Often, vaccinations, lab work, X-rays, and other services are excluded and charged for separately on a cash basis.

The Fee for Extra Care ("FFEC") is similar to the FFC model, however, the additional services are charged to Medicare or the patient's insurance plan. Some of the benefits and services typically included in these two retainer models are: same day access to your doctor; immediate cell phone and text messaging to your doctor; unlimited office visits with no co-pay; little or no waiting time in the office; focus on preventive care; unhurried atmosphere; cell phone, text message, and online consultations; prescription refills; and convenient appointment scheduling.

FFC or retainer plans may typically not be purchased with pre-tax dollars utilizing HSA and/or FSA accounts because it is not a fee incurred for a service. Instead, it functions more as an insurance policy where fees are paid in anticipation of an expense.

There is also a hybrid concierge model where physicians charge a monthly, quarterly, or annual retainer or membership fee for services that Medicare and insurers do not cover. These services may include: email access; phone consultations; newsletters; annual physicals; prolonged visits; and comprehensive wellness and evaluations plans. For all covered services, these providers will bill Medicare and insurance companies for patient visits and services covered by the plans. This model allows the physician to continue to see their non-retainer patients while billing their "concierge" patients a fee for the increased or "special" services. Some concierge practices are cash-only or "direct" primary care practices and do not accept insurance of any kind. In doing so, these practices can keep overhead and administrative costs low, thereby providing affordable healthcare to patients.

Concierge physicians care for fewer patients than those in a conventional practice, ranging from 50 patients per doctor to 1,000, compared to 3,000 to 4,000 patients that the average traditional physician now sees every year. All generally claim to be accessible via telephone or email at any time of day or night or offer some other service above and beyond the customary care. The annual fees vary widely, ranging, on average, from US$195 to US$5,000 per year for an individual with incremental savings when additional family members are added. The higher priced plans generally include most "covered" services where the client is not charged additional fees for most services (labs, xrays, etc.). Some of the other benefits of concierge healthcare are: in-home visits, worldwide access to doctors, and expedited emergency room care.

An informal one-year summary of findings related to the concierge medicine marketplace in the US was released in February 2010. The summary of the study concluded that at the end of 2009, over 66% of current U.S. concierge physicians operating practices were internal medicine specialists; and the second most popular medical specialty in concierge medicine was family practice. The study also noted that the number of concierge dental and pediatric practices increased markedly since February 2009.

In 2004, the Government Accountability Office counted 146 such practices, mostly concentrated on the US east and west coasts. As of 2006 the American Medical Association did not track the number of concierge practices because the concept was so new. Lower-cost concierge medical business models have also been attempted, such as GreenField Health in Portland, Oregon, which charged an annual fee between $195–$695 depending on age. Another is One Medical, the first major low-cost concierge medical group to attempt this model in a large scale, which requests a $199 annual membership fee.

== Compared to direct primary care ==
Direct primary care (DPC) is a term often linked to concierge medicine. While the two terms are similar, concierge medicine encompasses many different health care delivery models, including direct primary care. Both are variants of traditional primary care common in the United States, typically based on health insurance.

Direct Primary Care practices, similar in philosophy to their concierge medicine lineage, bypass insurance and go for a more "direct" financial relationship with patients and also provide comprehensive care and preventive services.

== History ==
The concierge medicine model, although not the term, originated with MD² International, which was founded in 1996 in Seattle by Dr. Howard Maron and Dr. Scott Hall. At the time, Maron was physician for the Seattle SuperSonics sports team, and sought to provide luxury primary care services similar to what he had been providing these athletes. MD²'s model included physician patient loads of 50 families, dramatically reduced compared with the conventional American patient load of about 3,000 patients per year. Advantages include very quick access to your personal physician as needed, and the ability to see doctors in any of 10 major cities at a greatly increased cost. MD² clients have insurance to cover additional services beyond primary care, but MD²'s fees cover the full costs of their services and MD² does not bill insurance.

MD²'s approach became widely known very quickly, and many physicians sought to emulate the model in a less costly fashion. MDVIP emerged as a competitor to MD² with a similar model, but they opted to bill insurance in addition to charging client fees and have patient loads of up to 600. This enabled them to charge substantially lower rates. In 2006 SignatureMD was founded which offered more flexible conversion options. By 2010, one quarter of all doctors operating with a concierge medicine model were affiliated with MDVIP. In 2017, a new company named Forward, started by former Google and Uber employees with strong venture capital support, began offering concierge medicine services for equivalent to $200 in 2025 per month.

Common services include 24/7 phone access, same-day appointments, short waiting times, preventative health and wellness services, and accompaniment when seeing specialists or in the emergency room.

By 2000, there were a handful of concierge medicine providers in the United States. In 2005, there were about 500 physicians practicing using the model. By 2008, there were over 100,000 people contracting with about 300 physicians. By 2010, there were over 5,000 physicians in over 500 providers using the model.

From 2012-2018, the Physicians Foundation has conducted a biennial survey of physicians and found that between 4.5-8.8% plan to switch to a concierge model each time.

In 2012, there were 4,400 private physicians – a 25% increase from 2011.

== Controversy ==
The concept of concierge medicine has been accused of promoting a two-tiered health system that favors the wealthy, limits the number of physicians to care for those who cannot afford it, and burdens the middle and lower class with a higher cost of insurance. Detractors contend that while this approach is more lucrative for some physicians and makes care more convenient for their patients, it makes care less accessible for other patients who cannot afford (or choose not) to pay the required membership fees.

In early 2008, it was reported that one health insurer was dropping from their provider networks some physicians who charge an annual fee. Another insurer also expressed opposition to annual fees. Other insurers do not oppose concierge medicine as long as patients are clearly informed that the fees will not be reimbursed by their health plan.

In 2003 and 2005, several members of Congress introduced or cosponsored bills that would have prohibited physicians from charging retainer fees. No action was taken, and it appears that no similar bills have been introduced in more recent Congresses. In the Medicare Prescription Drug, Improvement, and Modernization Act of 2003, the Congress directed the GAO to study concierge care and its impact on Medicare patients. The GAO report, published in 2005, concluded that the "small number of concierge physicians makes it unlikely that the approach has contributed to widespread access problems". In its comments on that report, DHHS noted its agreement with GAO's findings and stated that it would continue to monitor the trend. No specific information is available on monitoring activities.

== In popular culture ==
The USA Network television series Royal Pains focuses on such a doctor's introduction to the practice of concierge medicine. A young doctor becomes a for-hire physician for the wealthy residents of the Hamptons.

Also on USA Network television series Rush focuses on a doctor who serves rich, secretive clients.

The Robin Cook novel Crisis focuses on a medical malpractice trial involving a doctor practicing concierge medicine.

In Scrubs season 10, protagonist John Dorian begins the season as a concierge doctor.

== See also ==
- Direct primary care
- House call
- VIP medicine
