= S. Mark Young =

S. Mark Young is a professor and writer focused on management accounting and control, particularly in relation to the entertainment industry.

== Early life and education ==
Young was born in Sydney, Australia and attended Homebush Primary and High Schools. After he and his family moved to the United States, he graduated from Thomas Worthington High School. He holds an A.B. degree in Economics from Oberlin College, a Master's of Accounting degree from The Ohio State University, and holds a Ph.D. in Accounting from the University of Pittsburgh.

== Career ==
Young holds the George Bozanic and Holman G. Hurt Chair in Sports and Entertainment Business at the Marshall School of Business, University of Southern California. He is a Professor of Accounting at the Leventhal School of Accounting, also part of the Marshall School of Business, and holds courtesy appointments as a Professor of Journalism and Communication at USC Annenberg School for Journalism and Communication, and as a Professor of Management and Organization at the Marshall School. Young also serves as an instructor in management accounting for USC's Masters of Business for Veterans and USC's Executive MBA Programs.

As an avid high school and college tennis player, Young serves as the Official Historian for USC Men's Tennis Team. In 2018, Young published Trojan Tennis: A History of the Storied Men's Tennis Team at the University of Southern California.

Young has also done research on popular culture, which led to a collaboration with Mike Richardson and Steve Duin (columnist for The Oregonian newspaper), on Blast Off! Rockets, Robots, Ray Guns and Rarities from the Golden Age of Space Toys (Dark Horse Books, 2001). The book is a history of the role and influence of space toys on society through the late 1950s. Blast Off! has been used as a reference for sci-fi movies including Sky Captain and the World of Tomorrow.

In October 2006, Young and Loveline 's Dr. Drew Pinsky published a study entitled Narcissism and Celebrity in the Journal of Research in Personality. The study was included as part of the New York Times Magazine's special issue, The Year in Ideas for 2006. In 2009, Young and Pinsky's book, The Mirror Effect: How Celebrity Narcissism is Seducing America, was published by Harper Collins (New York). The Mirror Effect describes the process by which the narcissistic behaviors of celebrities have become normalized by modern media, and the presumed impact of this rising narcissism on today's youth.

== Awards and recognition ==
Young is recognized as a Distinguished Fellow at the Center for Excellence in Teaching at USC, and received the Mellon Foundation Mentoring Award. In 2020, the Management Accounting Section of the American Accounting Association honored him with the Lifetime Achievement Award in Management Accounting.
