= Calabasas Civic Center =

Center of government for Calabasas, California

Coordinates: 34.153189°N 118.647048°W

The Calabasas Civic Center serves the city of Calabasas, located in the western San Fernando Valley, Los Angeles County, California, United States.

== Complex ==
The civic center complex includes the Calabasas City Hall, Calabasas Library, Calabasas Amphitheater, and landscaped−furnished public patios.

The Spanish Colonial Revival style complex, which opened in July 2008, is located just west of The Commons at Calabasas shopping center.
