= Helene Stanton =

American actress

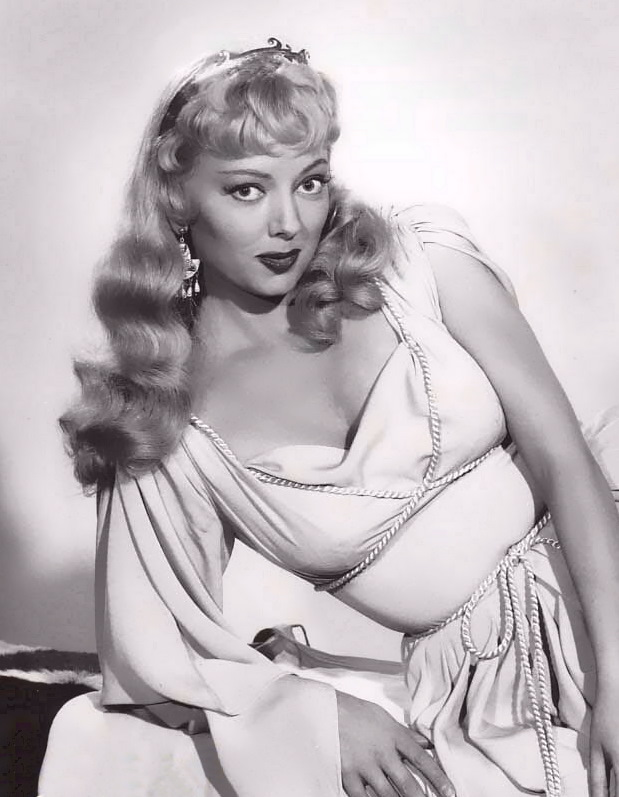
- Photo of Helene Stanton in 1954
- Born: Eleanor Mae Stansbury; November 4, 1925; Philadelphia, Pennsylvania
- Died: June 7, 2017 (aged 91); Pasadena, California
- Resting place: Forest Lawn Memorial Park, Glendale, Los Angeles, California
- Occupations: Singer, Actress
- Years active: 1943–1957
- Spouses: Ken Harlan (m. 1949; div. 1953) Morton Pinsky (m. 1957; died 2009)
- Children: 2 (including Drew Pinsky)

Helene Stanton (born Eleanor Mae Stansbury, November 4, 1925 – June 7, 2017) was an American singer and actress. Her career began as an opera singer for the Cosmopolitan Opera Company in Philadelphia, before moving to Hollywood, where she became a singer of popular music. In 1949, she married silent film actor Ken Harlan, but the marriage broke down and they divorced four years later in 1953.

After being spotted in Las Vegas and offered a part in the film The Big Combo, she moved to Los Angeles to pursue an acting career, starring in films alongside actors such as Johnny Weissmuller, Arthur Franz and Tom Drake. After several film roles during 1955 and starring in a silent role alongside comic Ben Blue in 1956, she retired from acting in 1957.

In 1957, she married Morton Pinsky and had two children with him, including celebrity doctor Drew Pinsky; they were married for over 50 years before his death in 2009.

== Early life ==
Stanton was born on November 4, 1925, in Philadelphia, Pennsylvania as Eleanor Mae Stansbury to parents William Benton Stansbury and Sarah Jane Hamilton and was the youngest of five children. She took ballet lessons as a child, believing this gave her a sense of control which people who had not danced did not have. From the age of 13, she took singing lessons.

== Career ==
Having originally sung opera for Philadelphia's Cosmopolitan Opera Company, she was asked in 1943 to sing in a stage version of The Merry Widow, before being persuaded to swap from classical to popular music upon coming to Hollywood. Following her divorce in 1953, she concentrated on her singing and became good friends with Jimmy McHugh, a songwriter.

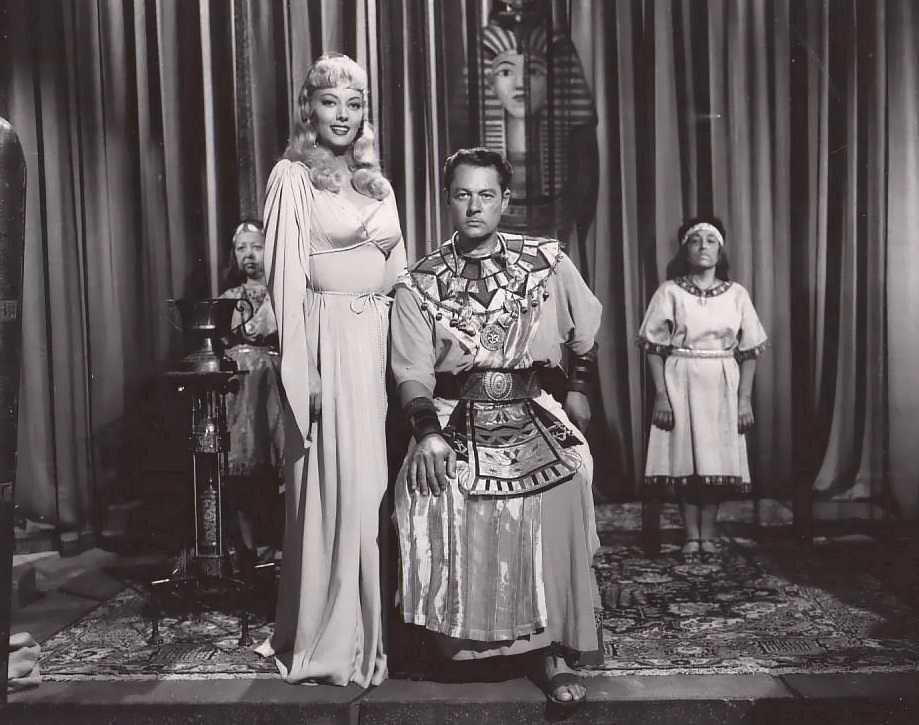
Stanton and Bill Henry on the set of Jungle Moon Men in 1954

In 1955, she was spotted by a producer for Allied Artists while performing in Las Vegas, who offered her a part in the film The Big Combo. She moved to Los Angeles in order to pursue a career in acting, which began while singing at Ciro's in West Hollywood, California, where she played in films alongside actors such as Johnny Weissmuller, Arthur Franz and Tom Drake. Despite her opinion that she would typically be cast in "flashy" roles, such as a burlesque dancer, she would try to compensate as being "as plain as possible" when not on stage, with people commenting on how different she looked when not wearing make-up. She would usually always accept offers of new types of roles without hesitation and convey previous experience in those types of roles even if she had none. Having worked alongside various talents, she expressed how she "learned something new" from everyone she had worked with. During a screen test for Jungle Moon Men, producer Sam Katzman described how she looked "like a million", with comparisons to Rita Hayworth in her tall and redheaded appearance. She described how she would work out in the gym to keep her muscles toned. She was described in 1956 as being "a provocatively sexy young lady" following a number of television roles, having won attention of filmmakers when performing "her sexy walk" on television.

She starred opposite comic Ben Blue in 1956, where she had to convey emotion without speech in an experience she described as "no easy task" but praised Blue as being "so great". Her final film was as a temperamental movie star in Universal's 1957 film Four Girls in Town. Following her marriage to Morton Pinksy in 1957, she retired from acting.

== Personal life ==
Born as Eleanor Stansbury, she changed her name at the suggestion of columnist and friend Louella Parsons, as it was felt her own name was "a little staid for a singer of popular songs". According to Parsons, Stanton had "a beautiful soprano voice".

In 1949, she married silent film actor Ken Harlan to become his eighth wife, but they divorced in December 1953 after having separated in April, on grounds of cruelty, although she told reporters that the divorce was "real friendly" and noting she thought he was a nice person. The couple had been married for around four years. She later married Dr. Morton Pinsky in 1957 and they remained together until his death in 2009.

Stanton died on June 7, 2017, in Pasadena, California, at the age of 91. She is buried at Forest Lawn Memorial Park in Glendale, Los Angeles and is survived by her son Drew Pinsky (better known as "Dr. Drew") and daughter Dana Chelf.

== Partial filmography ==
Film and television credits:

=== Film ===
- One Girl's Confession (1953)
- The Big Combo as Rita (1955)
- New Orleans Uncensored as Alma Mae (1955)
- Jungle Moon Men as Oma (1955)
- Sudden Danger as Vera (1955)
- The Phantom from 10,000 Leagues as Wanda (1955)
- Four Girls in Town as Rita Holloway (1957)

=== Television ===
- The Red Skelton Show
- Four Star Playhouse
- Highway Patrol
