= Drew Pinsky =

American media personality and physician (born 1958)

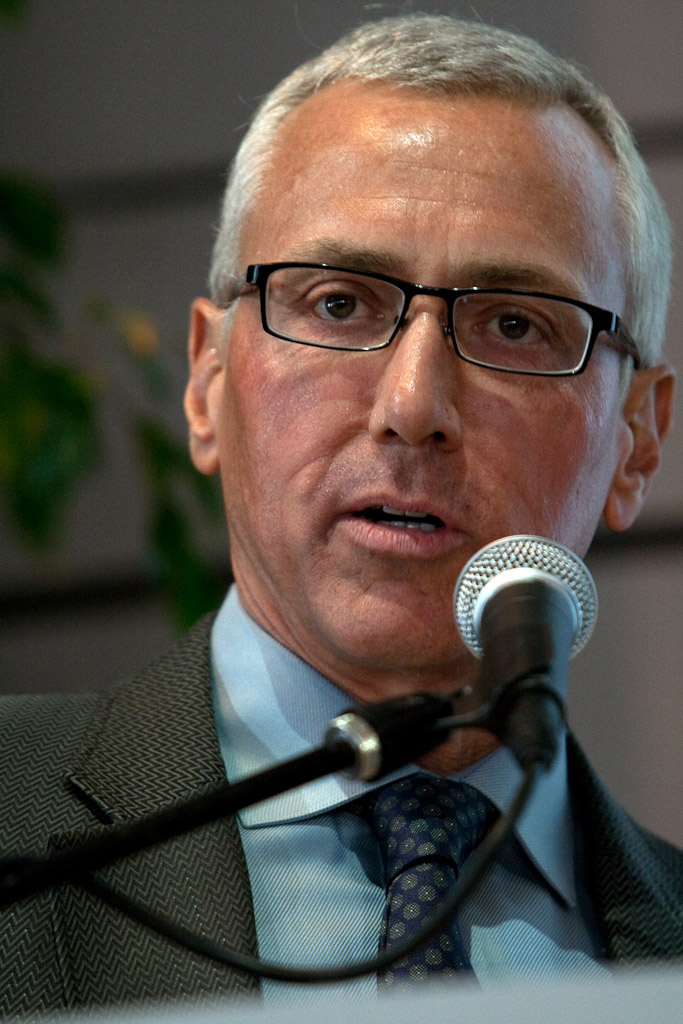
- Pinsky in 2009
- Born: David Drew Pinsky; September 4, 1958 (age 68); Pasadena, California, U.S.
- Education: Amherst College (BA); University of Southern California (MD)
- Spouse: Susan Sailer (m. 1991)
- Children: 3
- Parent(s): Helene Stanton; Morton Pinsky
- Presenting career
- Show: Loveline
- Stations: KROQ-FM; Various (syndicated)
- Network: Westwood One
- Show: Celebrity Rehab with Dr. Drew; Sex Rehab with Dr. Drew; Celebrity Rehab Presents Sober House; Dr. Drew On Call
- Network: VH1; MTV; HLN
- Website: Official website

David Drew Pinsky (born September 4, 1958), commonly known as Dr. Drew, is an American media personality, internist, and addiction medicine specialist. He hosted the nationally syndicated radio talk show Loveline from the show's inception in 1984 until its end in 2016. On television, he hosted the talk show Dr. Drew On Call on HLN and the daytime series Lifechangers on The CW. In addition, he served as producer and starred in the VH1 show Celebrity Rehab with Dr. Drew, and its spinoffs Sex Rehab with Dr. Drew, Celebrity Rehab Presents Sober House. Pinsky currently hosts several podcasts, including Ask Dr. Drew, The Dr. Drew Podcast on the PodcastOne Network, and The Adam and Drew Show with his former Loveline co-host Adam Carolla. From February 2019 - December 2023, he hosted Dr. Drew After Dark on the Your Mom's House network.

Pinsky is a former staff member at the Department of Chemical Dependency Services at Las Encinas Hospital in Pasadena, California, and Huntington Memorial Hospital. He currently maintains a private internal medicine practice in South Pasadena.

== Early life ==
Pinsky was born September 4, 1958 in Pasadena, California, to Helene Stanton (née Eleanor Mae Stansbury; 1925–2017), a singer and actress who played a supporting part in the 1955 film The Big Combo, and Morton Pinsky (1926–2009), a physician whose parents immigrated to the United States from Ukraine. Pinsky's father was Jewish, while he described his mother as coming from a "highly Victorian upper-middle-class family in Philadelphia."

After graduating from Polytechnic School in 1976, Pinsky studied biology at Amherst College, graduating in 1980 with a Bachelor of Arts. He then attended the University of Southern California's Keck School of Medicine, graduating in 1984 with a Doctor of Medicine degree. He served his residency in internal medicine at USC County Hospital and became chief resident at Huntington Memorial Hospital in Pasadena, and later moved into private practice.

== Career ==
My goal was always to be part of pop culture and relevant to young people, to interact with the people they hold in high esteem.

— Dr. Drew Pinsky, The New York Times, February 2008.

As The New York Times described it in February 2008, Pinsky's dual career in medicine and the mass media has required him to "navigat[e] a precarious balance of professionalism and salaciousness."

=== Radio work ===
In 1984 while still a medical student, Pinsky started appearing in "Ask a Surgeon", a segment of a Sunday night KROQ-FM show hosted by Jim "Poorman" Trenton and "Swedish" Egil Aalvik. "Ask the Surgeon" soon combined with "Loveline", another Sunday night segment, into a show of its own, co-hosted by Trenton and Pinsky. Loveline went national in 1995, and the television version launched on MTV the following year, hosted by Pinsky and Adam Carolla.

The exposure on both radio and television made Pinsky the "Gen-X answer to Ruth Westheimer [Dr. Ruth], with an AIDS-era, pro-safe-sex message." The MTV show ran for four years, while the radio show continued until April 2016 with cohost Mike Catherwood.

On November 27, 2007, Pinsky began Dr. Drew Live, another nationally syndicated talk radio show where he focused on a wider range of health issues. It originated from KGIL in Los Angeles, originally airing weekdays from 11:00 am to 1:00 pm PT The show was canceled in December 2008.

On January 5, 2015, Pinsky launched a new weekday program, "Dr. Drew Midday Live with Mike Catherwood", on KABC in Los Angeles. Leeann Tweeden became the co-host of the show starting on January 7, 2019.

On April 21, 2016, Pinsky announced Loveline would wrap up on April 28, 2016. Adam Carolla re-joined him as co-host for the final show.

=== Television ===
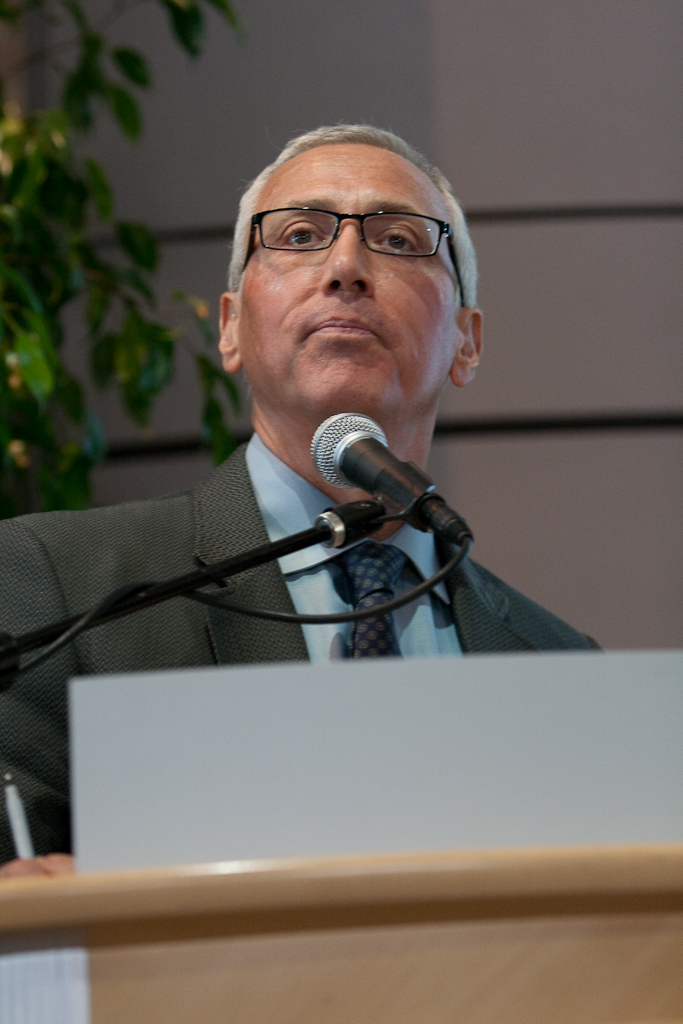
Pinsky in 2009

Pinsky's first television appearance was as a contestant on Wheel of Fortune in 1984, though he did not win. He also served as "health and human relations expert" on the first season of the U.S. TV series Big Brother in 2000.

He has also hosted several shorter educational television series, starting with Strictly Sex with Dr. Drew, which ran for 10 episodes on the Discovery Health Channel, followed by Strictly Dr. Drew which addressed everyday health concerns. He later hosted the MTV series Sex...with Mom and Dad (2008–2009).

In 2008, Pinsky starred in Celebrity Rehab with Dr. Drew, a reality television show which involves celebrities in a drug rehabilitation facility. The show was filmed at Pasadena Recovery Center, with Pinsky serving as the resident medical expert. The series premiered January 10, 2008 on VH-1 and was renewed for multiple seasons. A follow-up show to Celebrity Rehab with many of the same celebrities was Sober House, which began its first season in January 2009, and included celebrities from the first two seasons of Celebrity Rehab continuing their recovery in a sober living facility. In November 2009, Pinsky starred in a spinoff of Celebrity Rehab, Sex Rehab with Dr.Drew, which depicted celebrities being treated for sexual addiction over the course of three weeks at the Pasadena Recovery Center.

In a 2011 episode of Lifechangers, Dr. Drew brought on a 16-year-old Courtney Stodden and conducted an on-air ultrasound of her breasts to prove Stodden's claim she didn't have plastic surgery. The ultrasound was conducted by Dr. John Diaz, a plastic surgeon.

Pinsky makes guest appearances on various news programs where he usually gives his observations on the relationship between controlled substances and high-profile individuals. He has frequently given his views on the deaths of people such as Anna Nicole Smith, Heath Ledger and Michael Jackson, arguing that their fates should set examples of the seriousness of misusing drugs.

Pinsky has acted in several TV appearances (either portraying himself or a fictional character), Space Ghost Coast to Coast, Dawson's Creek, Family Guy. The Adam Carolla Project, Minoriteam, Robot Chicken, My Gym Partner's a Monkey, Code Monkeys, and The Midnight Gospel. Pinsky also appeared in the films New York Minute and Wild Hogs.

In early 2011, Pinsky began hosting his own show, Dr. Drew On Call on HLN that focuses on news involving health and addiction topics. On August 26, 2016, HLN and Pinsky announced that the show's last episode would be September 22 of that year.

On October 9, 2019, Pinsky competed in season two of The Masked Singer as "Eagle".

In 2023, Pinsky appeared on the reality TV series Special Forces: World's Toughest Test. He was eliminated in the first episode due to a medical problem.

=== Other work ===
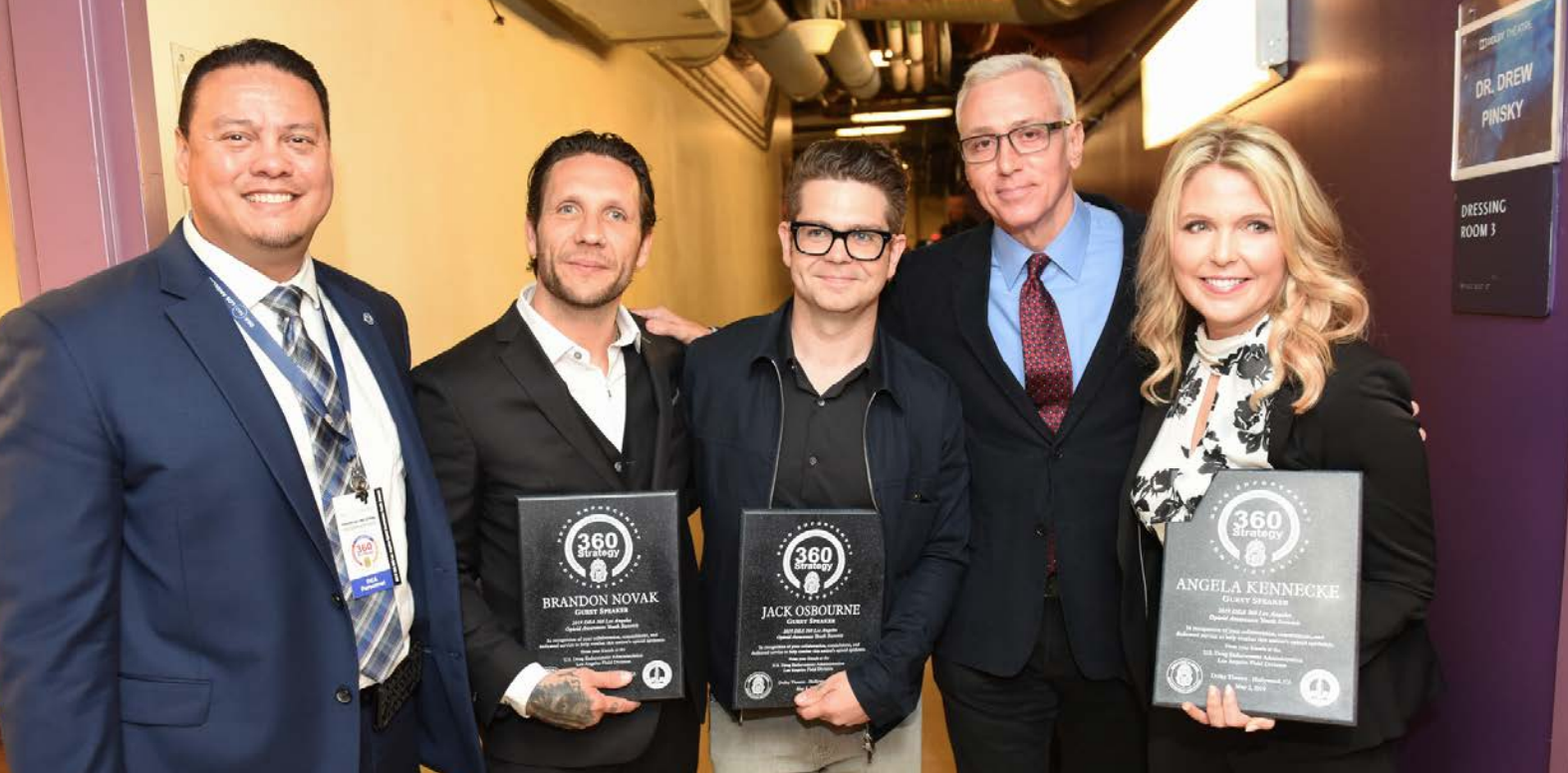
Pinsky (second from right) at the DEA Opioid Awareness Youth Summit in 2018

In 1999, Pinsky co-founded an Internet-based community and advice site for teenagers called DrDrew.com with Curtis Giesen. Among their early backers was Garage.com. DrDrew.com soon ran out of funding, and the company was sold to Sherwood Partners Inc., a corporate restructuring firm, which sold the remnants to DrKoop.com in November 2000. Pinsky re-acquired the site circa 2013 and began using it for general information about his books, radio and TV shows, as well as hosting his independent podcast, The Dr. Drew Podcast. In September 2012, Pinsky announced on The Adam Carolla Show that he will be doing a podcast on the Carolla Digital network.

In 2003, Pinsky authored Cracked: Putting Broken Lives Together Again, recounting his experiences as the medical director of the Department of Chemical Dependency Services at the Las Encinas Hospital drug rehabilitation clinic in Pasadena, California. He also contributed to the book When Painkillers Become Dangerous: What Everyone Needs to Know About OxyContin and Other Prescription Drugs, published in 2004.

In addition to his media appearances, Pinsky speaks at college campuses and other public venues. When Adam Carolla and Pinsky were teamed as hosts of Loveline, Carolla and Pinsky spoke at colleges.

Pinsky was the voice of 1-800-GET-THIN, advocating lap band surgery on radio ads and in a recording played for those who called 1-800-GET-THIN.

He also appeared with his dogs in a PETA ad campaign promoting the spaying and neutering of pets.

Pinsky also narrated for the 2014 documentary "Divorce Corp" and "Teen Species".

In early 2019, Pinsky started an online podcast "Dr Drew after Dark". The podcast is hosted at Tom Segura's studio "Studio Jeans".

Pinsky was featured in the first episode Netflix series "The Midnight Gospel".

On September 10, 2020, it was announced that Dr. Drew Pinsky joined Aditx Therapeutics as Senior Advisor to AditxtScore for Scoring the Immune System. In October, he first appeared on the Frenemies podcast, and appeared on the podcast again in December.

=== Honors ===
Asteroid 4536 Drewpinsky is named in his honor.

Pinsky was honored with the Larry Stewart Leadership and Inspiration Award at the 12th Annual PRISM Awards in 2008.

== Controversies ==
=== COVID-19 ===
Between February and March 2020, Pinsky made a series of statements concerning the COVID-19 outbreak where he downplayed the seriousness of the pandemic, stating that it was not as bad as the flu, and suggested that it was a "press-induced panic". Pinsky apologized in April 2020, and he urged people to follow the advice of Anthony Fauci.

=== L.A. County homeless commission ===
Pinsky has raised concerns for several years regarding homelessness in Los Angeles County and has been critical of how the government has handled it, stating:

For some reason, the government has taken the position that this is a housing problem, which, of course, housing is a piece of this, but for most—and by most I mean the vast majority of people on the streets—their condition makes them unwilling or unwanting to go indoors. So, even when they correct the housing problem, they're still going to have the same problem on the streets.

He has also been critical of certain aspects of the Lanterman–Petris–Short Act, in that it limits the ability of authorities to intervene when mentally ill persons are at risk of death due to being unable to care for their own needs. Pinsky said in an interview that he had correctly predicted a typhus outbreak in 2019 that occurred in the county as a result of rodents attracted to homeless encampments.

Pinsky was nominated to a local Los Angeles homeless commission by Kathryn Barger, a member of the Los Angeles County Board of Supervisors in April 2021. He faced criticism from local homeless rights advocates and a Twitter campaign. While supervisor appointments to local boards are rarely controversial, more than 100 people submitted public comments asking supervisors not to approve Pinsky. The board received less than five public comments in support of his nomination. Critics claimed that Pinsky had overreported the number of homeless people with mental illnesses or substance abuse disorders. Others, such as homeless advocate and charity leader Rev. Andy Bales, defended Pinsky and called the hashtag campaign and public commenting an "echo chamber". Pinsky's nomination was ultimately withdrawn.

=== Wellbutrin ===
Pinsky has received criticism from several sources for alleged conflict of interest in his promotion of the drug Wellbutrin.

According to an October 2011 government complaint against GlaxoSmithKline, Pinsky was the recipient in 1999 of two payments totaling $275,000 from Glaxo Wellcome (a company that would later merge into GlaxoSmithKline) to promote the company's drug Wellbutrin. Among other events, Pinsky made a 1999 appearance on the radio program 'David Essel - Alive!', discussing the sexual side effects of common SSRI medications and mentioned Wellbutrin as an example of depression medications that lack these side effects, (along with Serzone and Remeron, two medications from different manufacturers).

A transcript of this appearance and the invoice of the payment to Pinsky were later presented publicly as evidence during the criminal and civil actions against GlaxoSmithKline in 2012. In response to an inquiry from the Wall Street Journal about the case and specific physicians including Pinsky, the company declined to comment on their financial relationship with specific doctors, but acknowledged that "during the period from January 1999 to December 2003, there were some occasions on which certain GSK sales representatives, speakers, and consultants promoted its antidepressant Wellbutrin to physicians for uses which were not FDA-approved in violation of federal law." Pinsky himself was not mentioned in the statement, and was never charged with wrongdoing by any court or medical ethics board. When asked about the topic, Pinsky stated:

In the late 90s I was hired to participate in a 2-year initiative discussing intimacy and depression which was funded by an educational grant by Glaxo Wellcome…Services for the non-branded campaign included town hall meetings, writings and multimedia activities in conjunction with the patient advocacy group the National Depressive and Manic Depressive Association (NDMDA). My comments were consistent with my clinical experience.

== Personal life ==
Pinsky married on July 21, 1991. He and his wife, Susan Sailer, had triplets Douglas, Jordan, and Paulina in November 1992.

Pinsky lives in Pasadena, California. Interested in fitness since his early teens, he goes running and does weight training regularly. In addition to his hobby of traveling, he also enjoys singing opera, as his mother Helene Stanton was a professional singer. Pinsky stated on the June 24, 2009, episode of Loveline that at one point, he was torn between practicing medicine and becoming a professional opera singer. Pinsky stated that he auditioned for a celebrity singing show, but that the show passed on his appearance when he made it clear to producers that he could not sing pop songs but did perform an aria on Turn Ben Stein On.

Pinsky's father, Morton, died suddenly of a cerebral hemorrhage on October 27, 2009. A title card at the end of the season 3 finale of Celebrity Rehab dedicated the episode to him. Pinsky's mother, Helene, died on June 7, 2017, at age 91.

Pinsky is a nonobservant Jew; he admits to abandoning most Jewish practices but claims to retain a continued desire to learn about the religion. He explains that religious as well as philosophical studies affect his medical practice and his speeches, and that his background places "an indirect coloring on every answer."

In September 2013, Pinsky stated that he had recovered from prostate cancer surgery performed earlier that June and July, after which Pinsky did not require chemotherapy or radiation. During episode 119 of his podcast Dr. Drew After Dark, aired on June 10, 2021, Pinsky said that his prostate cancer has recurred after it was discovered during routine bloodwork that his PSA (Prostate-specific antigen) level is elevated. He will go through Stereotactic Body Radiation Therapy (SBRT) in July 2021.

In a 2011 interview on Kevin and Bean, Pinsky stated he would speak to any media outlet including TMZ and The National Enquirer but would not speak to the Los Angeles Times, explaining "They distort, and they mislead, and they take things out of context. I really am stunned at how shoddy their journalism is, so I stopped talking to them."

Politically, Pinsky considers himself libertarian, and has espoused more traditionally conservative views in recent years, such as the 'tyranny' of governmental overreach and the need for a "Liberty Party".

Pinsky told Ryan Holiday he was studying philosopher Epictetus and recommended it to him. Holiday says this sparked his interest in stoic philosophy, later becoming a New York Times best-selling author on the subject.

== Selected filmography ==
=== Film ===
Year	Title	Role	Notes
2004	New York Minute	Dr. Ryan	Credited as Dr. Drew Pinsky
2007	Wild Hogs	Doctor	Credited as Dr. Drew Pinsky
2020	Final Kill	Dr. Metzger	Credited as Drew Pinsky

=== Television ===
Year	Title	Role	Notes
1996–2000	Loveline	Himself - host	
1998–1999	Hollywood Squares	Himself - panelist	10 episodes
1998	Space Ghost Coast to Coast	Himself	Episode: "Terminal"
1999	Hang Time	Dr. Drew Pinsky	Episode: "Shall We Dance?"
2000	Big Brother	Himself	66 episodes
2003	Dawson's Creek	Dr. Drew Pinsky	Episode: "Lovelines"
2005	Family Guy	The Dermatologist	Episode: "Brian the Bachelor"
2006	Robot Chicken	Leader-1 / Man	Voice; Episode: "Book of Corrine"
2007	Code Monkeys	Referee	Voice; Episode: "Wrassle Mania"
2007–2021	Entertainment Tonight	Himself	43 episodes
2008–2011	Celebrity Rehab with Dr. Drew	Himself - host	50 episodes
2008–2017	The View	Himself	4 episodes
2010–2016	Teen Mom	Himself	16 episodes
2010–2021	The Wendy Williams Show	Himself	14 episodes
2010–2021	The Dr. Oz Show	Himself	4 episodes
2011–2016	Teen Mom 2	Himself	16 episodes
2011–2016	Dr. Drew On Call	Himself	94 episodes
2012	Metalocalypse	Dr. Tormindbind Mickmildididindnin	Voice; Episode: "Fanklok"
2015	Drunk History	Judge	Episode: "Inventors"
2015–2018	Rachael Ray	Himself	7 episodes
2017–18	How It Really Happened	Himself	5 episodes
2017–2020	The Greg Gutfeld Show	Himself	11 episodes
2018–2020	25 Words or Less	Himself	6 episodes
2019–Present	Ask Dr. Drew	Himself	500 episodes
2019	The Masked Singer	Himself / "Eagle"	4 episodes
2020	The Simpsons	Himself	Episode: "Screenless"
2020	The Midnight Gospel	Glasses Man	Episode: "Taste of the King"
2023	Special Forces: World's Toughest Test	Himself	Episode: "Test of Character"
2026	Nation's Dumbest	Himself	Season 1

== Published work ==
=== Journal publications ===
- Pinsky, Drew; S. Mark Young (October 2006). "Narcissism and celebrity". Journal of Research in Personality. 40 (5): 463–71. doi:10.1016/j.jrp.2006.05.005.
- Noll AM, Pinsky D (June 1991). "Withdrawal effects of metoclopramide". West. J. Med. 154 (6): 726–28. PMC 1002885. PMID 1877215.

=== Books ===
- Pinsky, Dr. Drew; with Robert Meyers; William White (2004). When Painkillers Become Dangerous: What Everyone Needs to Know about OxyContin and Other Prescription Drugs. New York: Hazelden Publishing & Educational Services. ISBN 1-59285-107-X.
- Pinsky, Dr. Drew (2003). Cracked: Putting Broken Lives Together Again. New York: Regan Books. ISBN 0-06-009655-1.
- Pinsky, Dr. Drew; with Adam Carolla; Marshall Fine (1998). The Dr. Drew and Adam Book: A Survival Guide To Life and Love. New York: Dell. ISBN 0-440-50836-3.
- Pinsky, Drew; Heischober, Bruce S. (2002). "Approaches to Management of Drug Abuse". In Neinstein, Lawrence S. (ed.). Adolescent health care: a practical guide (4th ed.). Hagerstown, MD: Lippincott Williams & Wilkins. ISBN 0-7817-2897-5.
- Pinsky, Dr. Drew; S. Mark Young (2009). The Mirror Effect: How Celebrity Narcissism Is Seducing America. London: HarperCollins. ISBN 978-0-06-158233-2.
