= Strictly Sex with Dr. Drew =

- Starring: Dr. Drew Pinsky
- Country of origin: United States
- No. of episodes: 10

Production
- Running time: approx. 0:46 (per episode)

Original release
- Network: Discovery Health
- Release: 2005 – 2005

Strictly Sex with Dr. Drew is a television show hosted by Loveline host Dr. Drew Pinsky. It ran for 10 episodes in all. Reruns were occasionally featured on the Discovery Health channel up to its shutdown.

== Episode guide ==
=== The Orgasm ===
This episode discusses everything that viewers want to know about orgasms. Dr. Drew investigates a new sex-enhancing pharmaceutical for women that is being developed at Cedars-Sinai Medical Center. Cameras follow a young couple to their private counseling session with sex expert Lou Paget to seek advice on improving their sex life.

=== How to Ruin Your Sex Life ===
Dr. Drew discusses several common relationship problems that can negatively affect a couple’s sex life, including infidelity, medical concerns, and poor behavior in the bedroom. He is joined by special guest Lisa Masterson, an obstetrician-gynecologist and author of How to Ruin Your Sex Life.

Dr. Masterson explains the physical and hormonal changes that occur in a woman’s body after childbirth and offers suggestions for improving intimacy and revitalizing a couple’s sex life after having a baby.

=== Ask Dr. Drew ===
Viewers ask Dr. Drew for help and advice concerning a range of topics such as how to improve their love life and other sexuality related concerns.

=== Sex, Drugs, & Surgery ===
Dr. Drew discusses the many surgical procedures available relating to the sexual experience including " revirginization", penile enlargement, and "vaginal rejuvenation". Guest star: Troy Hailparn

=== Sex: What Scares You? ===
Dr. Drew welcomes and interviews guests with a variety of sexual fears. He then speaks to psychoanalyst and counselor Dr. Bethany Marshall, who provides tips to overcome these and other fears. Drew also helps viewers face their fears and work through their sexual issues.

=== Sex: Fact or Fiction ===
Dr. Drew debunks or confirms a variety of sexual myths, with the help of guests Dr. Mehmet Oz and Dr. Lionel Tiger. They explore some misconceptions about sex and what's behind those beliefs, and they also reveal what the truth actually is.

=== Unmentionables ===
Dr. Drew examines how masturbation can actually help your sex life, and debunks many myths about masturbation. He also welcomes guests including Dr. John Sealy to discuss this "unmentionable" topic.

=== Was It Good For You? ===
Find out how to turn frustration into satisfaction by understanding the sexual differences between men and women. This one-hour episode explores the "Mars-Venus dilemma" and the different ways men and women approach sex. Dr. Drew travels to Atlanta's Emory University to explain why completely different things turn on men and women, and what happens in their brains during the arousal stage.

=== Am I Normal? ===
This is the core information that many viewers are seeking, for everyone wants the reassurance that they are sexually "normal". Dr. Drew is not afraid to explore it all, thereby providing answers to the top questions on everyone's mind. Dr. Drew travels to San Antonio, Texas, to document the surgery that can restore a woman's sex life. he also interviews urologist Dr. Carol Bennett to address awkward questions about real-life problems, including the best way to prevent premature ejaculation.

=== Sexual Chemistry ===
Dr. Drew explores the factors that attract two people to each other, including pheromones and other scents.
