= Sam Hersh =

American film producer (1906–1969)

- Born: November 20, 1906
- Died: January 24, 1969 (aged 62)
- Occupations: Film producer, film distributor, entrepreneur
- Known for: Founder of Family Films (1948–1985)

Samuel Hersh (November 20, 1906 - January 24, 1969) was an American film producer and distributor who founded Family Films in 1948. The company produced and distributed films for churches and religious organizations, including the Southern Baptist Convention and the Lutheran Church–Missouri Synod.

== Early life and career ==
Sam Hersh was born in New York City on November 20, 1906, the son of Hungarian Jewish immigrants. He married Ruth Mond in 1927, and worked in a variety of occupations during the Great Depression including bookmaking and real estate. He moved to California along with his family in 1941.

Before entering the film industry, he initially had no interest in religious filmmaking. His involvement in film distribution began around 1940 when, in lieu of repaying a debt, an associate transferred to him the distribution rights to a series of short films on the life and music of American composer Stephen Foster. Hersh distributed The Life and Songs of Stephen Foster in 1940. He later entered the production of religious and family-oriented films. In 1945 Hersh started his own independent production company, with plans to make his first full-length movie, Hollywood High School, written by Elmer Clifton. It is unclear if this film was ever made and distributed.

== Family Films ==
Hersh founded Family Films in 1948 to produce films for general family audiences rather than exclusively denominational use. According to historian Harvey Marks, Hersh was not a Christian at the time but later converted to Christianity and increasingly emphasized Christian themes in his productions.

The company's first films, such as A Boy and His Prayer, Yesterday, Today, and Forever, and Unto Thyself Be True (all 1949), were produced at Occidental Studios and Hal Roach Studios. These works addressed contemporary social issues such as alcoholism, crime, and family responsibility. A representative later film, In His Name (1950), included the themes of forgiveness and vocational calling.

== Distribution and partnerships ==
Hersh marketed the films directly to churches, particularly in the American South. By 1950, Family Films had contracts with the Southern Baptist Convention, producing films such as Dedicated Men and the widely distributed Bible on the Table (1950). Many Baptist productions released through Broadman Films during this period were co-productions with Family Films.

In the late 1940s and early 1950s, Hersh occasionally used the name S. M. Hershey in film credits to avoid professional stigma associated with religious filmmaking in Hollywood.

Family Films also produced films and television programs for several other denominations. The company produced the Lutheran Church–Missouri Synod television series This Is the Life for twenty-three years through its subsidiary Concordia Films, as well as short feature films like All That I Have (1951). Hersh also worked with Southern Baptists on This Is the Answer, and with Methodists on The Way.

== Production output ==
During the 1950s and 1960s, Family Films became one of the most prolific religious film studios in the United States, producing more than 150 films and approximately 800 filmstrips. Its output ranged from contemporary social dramas to biblical dramatizations.

Major biblical series included The Living Bible (1952) and The Book of Acts Series (1957), directed primarily by Eddie Dew and featuring Nelson Leigh as Jesus. According to Lindvall and Quicke, these productions were characterized by minimalist staging and a didactic style.

Hersh regularly worked with director William F. Claxton, who later directed episodes of Little House on the Prairie. Claxton's Family Films projects included Talents (1953), Our Children: King of the Block (1958), God Is My Partner (1957), and I’ll Give My Life (1960). Other notable productions included As We Forgive (1952), directed by Sam White, which addressed juvenile delinquency and church-based rehabilitation, and The Power of the Resurrection, a one-hour television movie about the story of Easter written by Henry Denker and directed by Harold Schuster.

Like many Hollywood producers, some of Hersh's planned projects and television shows did not make it beyond the first pilot. One example was The Adventures of Tom Mix, starring William Campbell and directed by Frank McDonald. This pilot was filmed by Hersh and Family Films in 1957 but was never picked up by the studios to be produced as a television series. Another example was the 1954 planned feature film Christ is My Cellmate, which was never distributed.

Most of Hersh's production work was done in conjunction with Family Films, but one major exception was his work as the producer of the 1957 adventure film Lure of the Swamp, directed by Hubert Cornfield.

== Influence and later years ==
Hersh encouraged filmmaker Mel White to enter the church film market, acquiring White's Charlie Churchman comedies, including Charlie Churchman and the Teenage Masquerade (1967) and Charlie Churchman and the Clowns (1968). Film historian Terry Lindvall describes these films as among the most commercially successful church films of the period.

Hersh died in 1969, survived by his wife Ruth Hersh. His sons, Melvin Hersh and Stanley Hersh, continued operating Family Films, which later released the teen-oriented video series The Goosehill Gang (1980) before being transferred to Concordia Publishing.

== Select Filmography ==
=== Films ===
- A Boy and His Prayer (1949) – producer
- Yesterday, Today, and Forever (1949) – producer
- Unto Thyself Be True (1949) – producer
- In His Name (1950) – producer
- Speak No Evil (1950) – producer (credited as S. M. Hershey)
- Rim of the Wheel (ca. 1950) – producer (credited as S. M. Hershey)
- Dedicated Men (1950) – producer
- Bible on the Table (1950) – producer
- All That I Have (1951) – producer
- Talents (1953) – producer
- God Is My Partner (1957) – producer
- Lure of the Swamp (1957) – producer
- Our Children: King of the Block (1958) – producer
- The Power of the Resurrection (1958) – producer
- I’ll Give My Life (1960) – producer
- A Letter to Nancy (1965) – producer

=== Television / Series ===
- This Is the Life (1956–1969) – producer
- The Living Bible (1952–55) – producer
