= I'll Give My Life =

1960 film by William F. Claxton

- Directed by: William F. Claxton
- Written by: Herbert Moulton
- Produced by: Pierre Couderc (associate producer); Sam Hersh (producer); S. Roy Luby (associate producer)
- Cinematography: Walter Strenge
- Edited by: Robert Fritch
- Release date: 3 February 1960
- Running time: 78 minutes
- Country: United States
- Language: English

I'll Give My Life is a 1960 American religious film directed by William F. Claxton. The film is also known as The Unfinished Task in the United States. It is the final film role of Ray Collins before his death in 1965.

== Plot ==
John Bradford expects his son Jim to join his engineering firm, but Jim instead joins the ministry, attending a seminary for four years before being assigned to New Guinea.

John's secretary is Jim's sweetheart Alice, who is left behind for years before Jim proposes marriage. She goes to New Guinea, where they wed and become the parents of two children. All is well until Jim contracts a life-threatening disease. John flies to New Guinea to be with his son at the end of his life, then tries to understand its meaning and purpose through the journals Jim leaves behind.

== Cast ==
- Ray Collins as John Bradford
- John Bryant as James W. Bradford
- Angie Dickinson as Alice Greenway Bradford
- Katherine Warren as Dora Bradford
- Donald Woods as Pastor Goodwin
- Jon Shepodd as Bob Conners
- Stuart Randall as Rex Barton
- Richard Benedict as Cpl. Burr
- Sam Flint as Roy Calhoun
- Ivan Triesault as Dr. Neuman
- Jimmy Baird as Jimmy Bradford
- Mimi Gibson as Jodie Bradford
- Milton Woods as Kopa, Medical Orderly
- Virginia Wave as Miss Lane
- Vera Frances as Tem Lane, Secretary
