= God Is My Partner =

1957 film

- Theatrical release poster
- Directed by: William F. Claxton
- Written by: Charles F. Royal
- Produced by: Sam Hersh
- Starring: Walter Brennan; John Hoyt; Marion Ross; Jesse White; Nelson Leigh; Charles Lane
- Cinematography: Walter Strenge
- Edited by: Robert Fritch
- Music by: Paul Dunlap
- Production company: Regal Films Inc
- Distributed by: 20th Century Fox
- Release date: July 1957
- Running time: 82 minutes
- Country: United States
- Language: English
- Budget: $150,000
- Box office: more than $750,000

God Is My Partner is a 1957 American drama film directed by William F. Claxton and written by Charles F. Royal. The film stars Walter Brennan, John Hoyt, Marion Ross, Jesse White, Nelson Leigh and Charles Lane. The film was released in July 1957, by 20th Century Fox. It cost $150,000 and returned more than $750,000.

== Plot ==
Prominent surgeon Charles Grayson retires from his practice, intending to donate his money to charitable religious causes. His family launches a suit against him, hoping to have him declared legally incompetent and unable to manage his money. But Grayson's faithful niece Frances, an attorney, takes on his courtroom defense. Thanks to the testimony of many of his grateful patients, Brennan is declared sane and is permitted by court decree to spend his money as he sees fit.

== Cast ==
- Walter Brennan as Dr. Charles Grayson
- John Hoyt as Gordon Palmer
- Marion Ross as Frances Denning
- Jesse White as Louis 'The Lump' Lumpkin
- Nelson Leigh as Rev. William Goodwin
- Charles Lane as Judge Warner
- Ellen Corby as Mrs. Dalton
- Paul Cavanagh as Dr. James Brady
- Nancy Kulp as Maxine Spelvana
- John Harmon as 'Long Shot' Ben Renson
- Lyle Talbot as Dr. Warburton
- Charles H. Gray as Ross Newman
- Gloria Blondell as Tree Critic / Wife
- Edgar Dearing as Mike Malone

== Development ==
God Is My Partner was a remake of an earlier collaboration between Sam Hersh, Charles F. Royal, and William F. Claxton, the 1951 short feature film All That I Have, which starred Donald Woods, John Eldridge, Onslow Stevens, and Houseley Stevenson. Paul Cavanagh was the only actor to be cast in both productions. Both films were based on a story by Leete Renick Brown.
