= The Outlaw's Daughter (film) =

1954 film by Wesley Barry

- Theatrical release poster
- Directed by: Wesley Barry
- Screenplay by: Samuel Roeca
- Produced by: Wesley Barry
- Starring: Bill Williams; Sheila Connolly; Jim Davis; George Cleveland; Sara Haden; Elisha Cook, Jr. Nelson Leigh
- Cinematography: Gordon Avil
- Edited by: Ace Herman
- Music by: Raoul Kraushaar
- Production company: 20th Century Fox
- Distributed by: 20th Century Fox
- Release date: November 1, 1954
- Running time: 76 minutes
- Country: United States
- Language: English

The Outlaw's Daughter is a 1954 American Western film directed by Wesley Barry and written by Samuel Roeca. The film stars Bill Williams, Sheila Connolly, Jim Davis, George Cleveland, Sara Haden, Elisha Cook, Jr. and Nelson Leigh. The film was released on November 1, 1954, by 20th Century Fox.

== Cast ==
- Bill Williams as Jess Raidley aka Big Red
- Sheila Connolly as Kate Dalton
- Jim Davis as Marshal Dan Porter
- George Cleveland as Lem Creel
- Sara Haden as Mrs. Merril
- Elisha Cook, Jr. as Lewis 'Tulsa' Cook
- Nelson Leigh as Jim Dalton
- Guinn "Big Boy" Williams as Moose
- George Barrows as 'Rock' Swenson
