= William Smithers =

American actor (1927–2026)

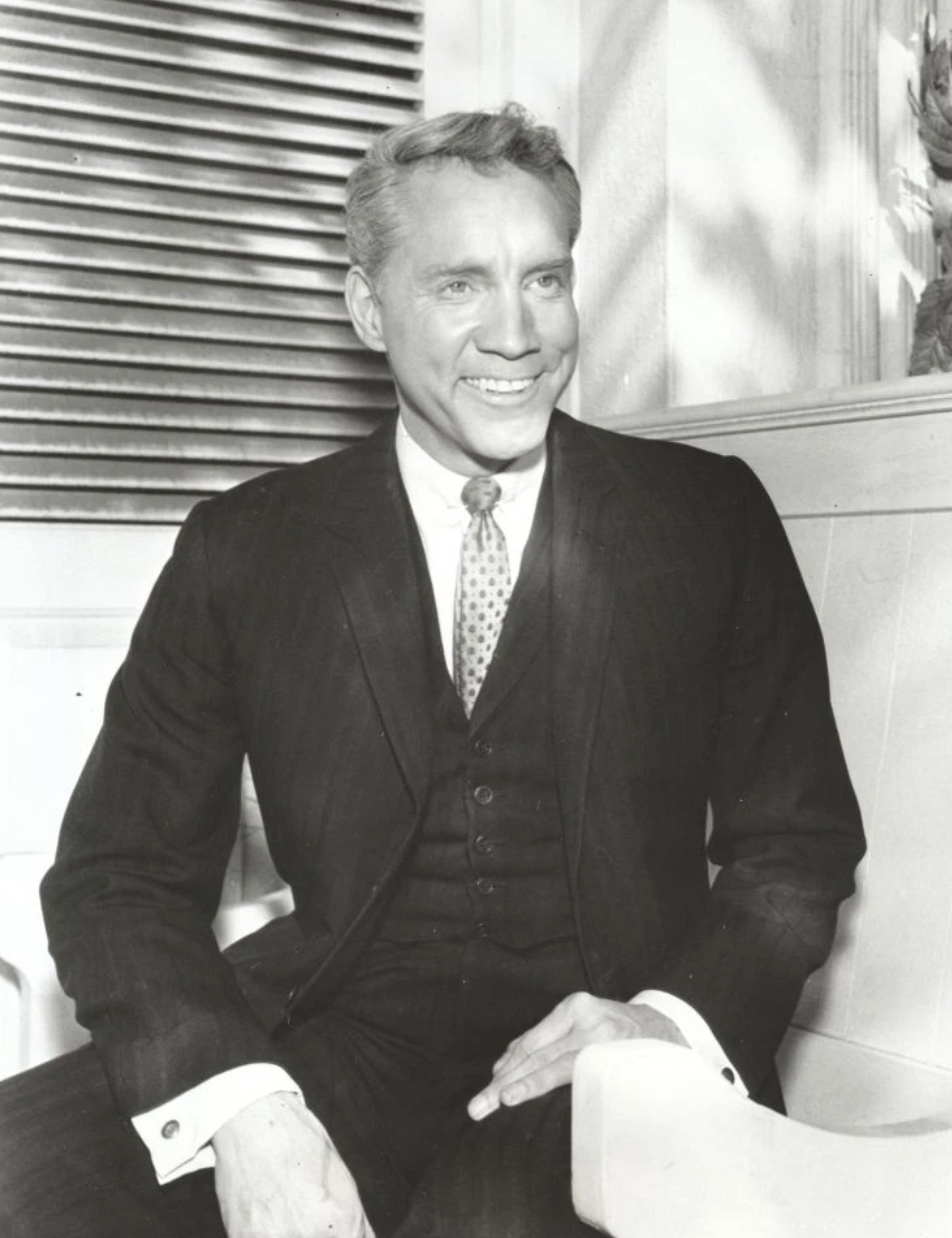
- Smithers as David Schuster in Peyton Place, 1965
- Born: Marion Wilkinson Smithers Jr. July 10, 1927; Richmond, Virginia, U.S.
- Died: May 26, 2026 (aged 98); Santa Barbara, California, U.S.
- Occupation: Actor
- Years active: 1951–2011
- Spouse: S. Loraine Boos Hull (m. 1995; died 2022)

Marion Wilkinson Smithers Jr. (July 10, 1927 — May 26, 2026), known professionally as William Smithers, was an American actor best known for his recurring roles as David Schuster in Peyton Place from 1965 to 1966 and as Jeremy Wendell in the television series Dallas in 1981 and from 1984 to 1989.

== Early life and career ==
Smithers was born on July 10, 1927, in Richmond, Virginia, the son of systems engineer Marion Wilkinson Smithers and Marion Albany Smithers (née Thompson).

In 1951, he made his Broadway debut as Tybalt in the Dwight Deere Wiman production of Romeo and Juliet, starring Olivia de Havilland; for this performance he received a Theater World Award. In 1952, he was accepted as a life member of The Actors Studio. In 1957, he received an Obie Award for his portrayal of Treplev in Anton Chekhov's The Seagull.

== Stage ==
His other Broadway plays included Jean Anouilh's Legend of Lovers, Calder Willingham's End as a Man, (begun as a project at the Actors Studio), Carson McCullers's The Square Root of Wonderful and Terence Rattigan's Man and Boy (performed in London and New York).

Off-Broadway, he played leading roles in Frank Gilroy's Who'll Save the Plowboy? (Obie Award, Best Drama), Willingham's End as a Man (before the production went to Broadway), George Bellak's The Troublemakers and Sean O'Casey's Shadow of a Gunman (also begun as a Studio project).

== Film and television ==
In 1965, Smithers moved to Los Angeles to play "David Schuster" in the television series Peyton Place for nine months. He also played Stanley Norris on the soap opera Guiding Light from 1970 to 1971, and, from 1976 to 1977, was a cast member in the series Executive Suite.

He appeared in nearly 400 television productions, including The Invaders, Barnaby Jones, Voyage to the Bottom of the Sea, Star Trek, Combat!, Mission: Impossible, and Hawaii Five-O, as well as feature films such as Attack (1956), Trouble Man (1972), Scorpio (1973), Papillon (1973), The Six Million Dollar Man (1974), and Deathsport (1978).

In 1981 and from 1984 to 1989, he played oil baron Jeremy Wendell on the prime-time soap opera Dallas.

== Smithers vs. MGM ==
As the plaintiff in Smithers vs. MGM, despite being threatened with blacklisting should he pursue the matter, he sued the multimillion-dollar film studio to protect his contractual rights with regard to star billing in the 1976 television series Executive Suite. In so doing, he won a case that was appealed as far as the California Supreme Court, and is now taught in entertainment law courses.

== Later life and death ==
Smithers lived in Santa Barbara, California, with his wife, acting teacher S. Loraine Boos Hull, known as Lorrie Hull Smithers (August 5, 1928 – January 10, 2022). She authored Strasberg's Method: As Taught by Lorrie Hull. With Smithers, she co-produced an acting-training DVD The Method).

From 2003 to 2005, he created, produced and directed the Santa Barbara Theatre of the Air for KCSB radio, broadcasting works of classic and contemporary playwrights.

From 2010 to 2013, he and his wife were co-hosts and co-producers of the Santa Barbara Channels (now TV Santa Barbara) television interview program Just Between Us! Seven episodes of this program were named finalists for the 2011, 2012 and 2013 WAVE (Western Access Video Excellence) Awards.

In 2010 and 2011, Smithers served on the Board of Directors of TV Santa Barbara. In December 2015, he was appointed by the Santa Barbara City Council to the city's Arts Advisory Committee.

Smithers died on May 26, 2026, at the age of 98.

== Filmography ==
=== Film ===
Year	Title	Role	Notes
1956	Attack	Lt. Harold 'Harry' Woodruff	
1964	The Parisienne and the Prudes	Henry	
1972	Trouble Man	Captain Joe Marx	
1973	Scorpio	Mitchell	
1973	Papillon	Warden Barrot	
1978	Deathsport	Dr. Karl	

=== Television ===
Year	Title	Role	Notes
1952-1953	Suspense	Joe Cable	4 episodes
1953	Mister Peepers	Jerry	1 episode
1954	The Shadow	Alex Bromm	TV Movie
1955-1956	General Electric Theater	Ray Poole	2 episodes
1955-1957	Studio One		6 episodes
1955-1961	Armstrong Circle Theatre	Bill	5 episodes
1957	Omnibus	Lt. Gen. A.P. Hill	season 5, episode 16 - Lee at Gettysburg
1957	The Seven Lively Arts	Bill	season 1, episode 2 - The World of Nick Adams
1958	Harbourmaster	Chris	season 1, episode 24 - Strangers in Town
1959	True Story	Johnny Burgess	1 episode
1960-1961	The Witness	Committee Member	6 episodes
1962-1963	Young Doctor Malone	Lt. Flagler	
1964	Espionage	Crawford Layton	season 1, episode 24 - A Tiny Drop of Poison
1964	The Reporter	Lieutenant	season 1, episode 1 - Extension Seven
1965	The Defenders	District Attorney Koch	season 4, episode 21 - No-Knock
1965	Combat!	Lt. Markes	season 3, episode 27 - Cry in the Ruins
1965	Eagle in a Cage	Gourgade	TV Movie
1965-1966	Peyton Place	David Schuster	56 episodes
1966	Shane	Del Packard	season 1, episode 3 - The Wild Geese
1966	The Road West	Sam Gaskins	season 1, episode 8 - Piece of Tin
1966	Voyage to the Bottom of the Sea	John Wilson	season 3, episode 12 - The Plant Man
1966	The Felony Squad	Roy Madden	season 1, episode 13 - The Killer Instinct
1966-1968	Mission: Impossible	Frank Egan, Victor Tomar	2 episodes
1967-1968	The Invaders	Nat Greely, Adam Lane	2 episodes
1967-1969	The F.B.I.	Joseph Kearny, Clay Keller, Frank William Stocker, John Debecker	4 episodes
1967	Jericho	Colonel Otto Van Fehrmann	season 1, episode 13 - Both Ends Against the Riddle
1967	Judd, for the Defense	John Emery	season 1, episode 2 - The Deep End
1967	Tarzan	Brooks	season 2, episode 7 - The Fanatics
1968	Mannix	Salvatore Pucci	season 1, episode 21 – Eight to Five, It's a Miracle
1968	Star Trek: The Original Series	Merik	season 2, episode 15 - Bread and Circuses
1968	Premiere	Joseph Kane	season 1, episode 1 - Call to Danger
1968	Call to Danger	Joseph Kane	TV Movie
1968	It Takes a Thief	Mr. Aiken	season 2, episode 16 - The Packager
1968, 1970	The Mod Squad	Hank Frederick & Lew Dickens	season 1, episode 11 - Twinkle, Twinkle, Little Starlet season 2, episode 19 - Survival House
1969	The Bold Ones: The New Doctors	Dr. Truesdale	season 1, episode 3 - The Rebellion of the Body
1969	The Monk	Leo Barnes	TV Movie
1969, 1970	Ironside	Frank Rich & Ross Farley	season 2, episode 19 - A World of Jackals season 3, episode 25 - Tom Dayton is Loose Among Us
1970	Hawaii Five-O	Dr. Warren Parker	season 2, episode 16 - Bored, She Hung Herself
1970	Marcus Welby, M.D.	George Howe	season 1, episode 19 - Go Get 'Em Tiger
1970	The Brotherhood of the Bell	Dr. Jerry Fielder	TV Movie
1970	The Name of the Game	Dave Martin	2 episodes
1971	The Neon Ceiling	Doctor Miller	TV Movie
1972	Cades County	William Courtney	season 1, episode 14 - One Small, Acceptable Death
1973	Owen Marshall, Counselor at Law	Mark Wade	season 2, episode 22 - Final Semester
1973	Hawkins	Sam Drummomd	season 1, episode 1 - Murder in Movieland
1974	The Rookies	Pete Martin	season 2, episode 17 - The Late Mr. Brent
1974	The Six Million Dollar Man	General Koslenko	season 1, episode 6 - Doomsday, and Counting
1974	Cannon	Colonel Cade	season 4, episode 5 - The Deadly Trail
1974	The Manhunter	Jack Hobson	season 1, episode 12 - The Lodester Ambush
1975	The Streets of San Francisco	Dr. Norman Jessup	season 3, episode 19 - The Programming of Charlie Blake
1975, 1979	Barnaby Jones	Felix Jordan & Burt Parish	season 4, episode 2 - Theater of Fear season 8, episode 8 - Homecoming for a Dead Man
1976-1977	Executive Suite	Anderson Gault	18 episodes
1977	Most Wanted	Brian Demery	season 1, episode 19 - The Death Dealer
1978	The Amazing Spider-Man	James Colbert	season 2, episode 3 - The Con Caper
1978	Lucan	Stockwood	season 1, episode 10 - The Creature Beyond the Door
1979, 1982	Quincy, M.E.	Senator Al Stevenson & Colonel Hamel	season 4, episode 20 - Semperfidelis season 7, episode 9 - Bitter Pill
1980	Where the Ladies Go	Mullen	TV Movie
1980	The Return of Frank Cannon	William Barrett	TV Movie
1981-1989	Dallas	Jeremy Wendell	50 episodes
1984	Scarecrow and Mrs. King	Carling London	season 2, episode 5 - Charity Begins at Home
1987	Sledge Hammer!	Colonel Poltz	season 2, episode 13 - They Call Me Mr. Trunk
1990	Hunter	Major Cody	season 7, episode 4 - Kill Zone
1994	Walker, Texas Ranger	Milo Crane	season 3, episode 9 - Payback
