= John Bryant (actor) =

American actor (1916–1989)

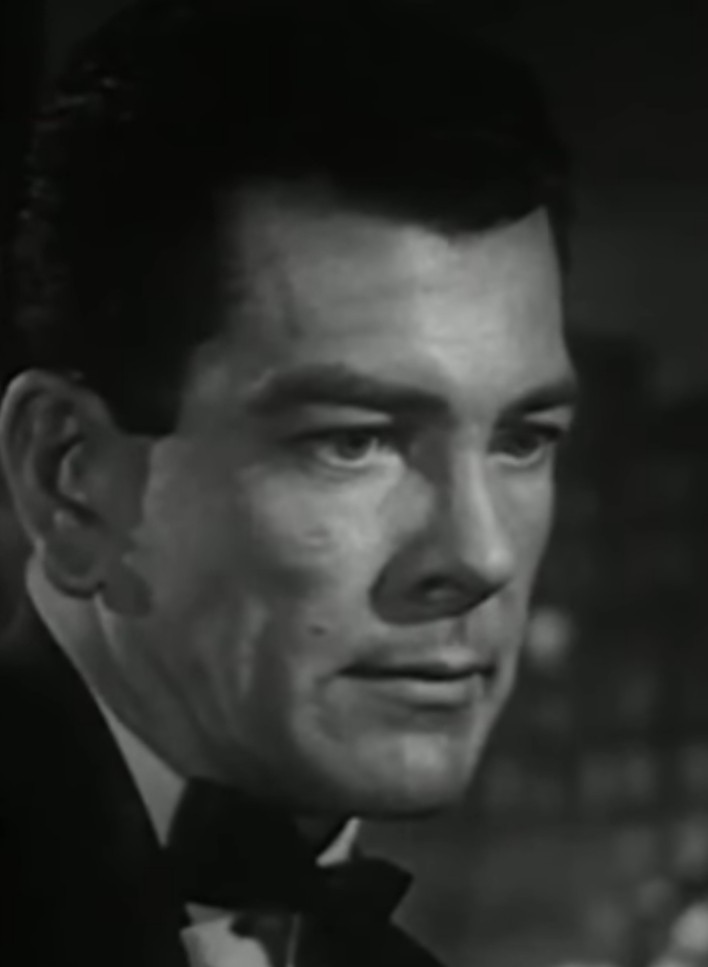
- Bryant in I'll Give My Life (1960)
- Born: Charles Briton Yonts Jr. August 10, 1916; Dixon, Illinois, U.S.
- Died: July 13, 1989 (aged 72); Los Angeles, California, U.S.
- Other name: C.B. Yonts
- Education: School of the Art Institute of Chicago
- Occupation: Actor
- Years active: 1944–1969
- Spouse: Janet Remick (m. 1941; div. 1946)
- Children: 1
- Military career
- Allegiance: United States
- Branch: U.S. Army
- Service years: 1941–1945
- Rank: Captain
- Service number: 36218084
- Unit: Signal Corps
- Conflicts: World War II

John Bryant (August 10, 1916 – July 13, 1989) was a prolific American actor active from 1944 through 1969. He performed in the famous G.I. version of Hamlet, both in the Central Pacific Theater during World War II and later on Broadway. He also acted in films, but was most prevalent on television, playing many lead and character parts including a five-year recurring role as Dr. Carl Spalding on The Virginian.

== Early life ==
He was born Charles Briton Yonts Jr. in Dixon, Illinois on August 10, 1916. His parents were C. B. Yonts Sr. and Mary E. Monaghan. His father, a power company manager, moved the family to LaCrosse, Wisconsin while Bryant was still a toddler. By 1930, the family had moved again, to Milwaukee, where his father was now president of an electric utility company. Bryant appears to have been an only child.

He attended Washington High School in Milwaukee. In September 1934, at age 18, he arrived at the Port of New York from Hamburg, Germany. The reason for this trip is not known, but having been made at the height of the Great Depression, points up the comfortable circumstances of his upbringing.

Bryant applied for his social security card in March 1938 under his birth name. He was still living at home in April 1940 when the US Federal Census for that year showed him as having completed three years of college. In October 1940, he registered for the draft, giving his parents' home in Milwaukee as his address while indicating he was a student at the School of the Art Institute of Chicago. The draft registrar recorded him as being 6 ft 1 in (185 cm), 165 pounds (75 kg), with black hair, blue eyes, and a slight scar under his right eye.

== Military service ==
Bryant enlisted in the US Army at Milwaukee, under his birth name, in August 1941. His enlistment papers noted he was married, had completed three years of college, his civil occupation was "Actor", but recorded a much lower height, 5 ft 10 in (178 cm), and weight, 156 pounds (71 kg).

By May 1944 he was a first lieutenant, in a Hawaiian-based Army Entertainment Section attached to the Signal Corps. (Performers assigned to these units were often given officer rank if they had some college or formal professional training). The unit to which Bryant was assigned was commanded by Major Maurice Evans, one of the foremost interpreters of Shakespeare on the pre-war American stage.

During October 1944, Bryant played Horatio to Evans's Prince Hamlet in a famous G.I. version of Hamlet. Reviewer Edna B. Lawson said "Capt. C.B. Yonts portrayed Horatio with quietness, strength, and poise". The production was performed for both military and civilian audiences in Hawaii during October and November 1944 then taken on tour to bases throughout the Central Pacific region for the remainder of the war.

== Career ==
=== Early career ===
The "G.I. Hamlet" was so successful that following the war's end Michael Todd decided to mount a Broadway revival, with Maurice Evans reprising the title role. Bryant, on terminal leave from the Army, flew from Hawaii to New York in November 1945 to audition and was given the part of Francisco. Notably, the newspaper reporting this identified him as "Capt. John Bryant". For both the one week tryout in Boston and the four-month run on Broadway his billing was John Bryant. There is no public record of him ever using his birth name again.

From April 1946 to November 1950 there is a gap in the record of Bryant's performing career. The 1950 US Census records him as living in a rooming house in Los Angeles, working part-time as a bus boy in a restaurant. Later that same year he began getting uncredited bit parts in films at several different movie studios. The first one released was Dial 1119, followed in 1951 by four more minor films.

With 1952 Bryant's career began to blossom. He had his first credited film role in Red Snow, his first known television roles on episodes of Big Town and The Lone Ranger, and played the lead in an original play Willow Whistle at the Laguna Beach Playhouse. Bryant was cast as a psychopathic killer in another original production, Nightshade, at the Pasadena Playhouse in March 1953, for which he received high praise from the Los Angeles Times critic.

Bryant had a minor uncredited part in From Here to Eternity. He returned to summer stock at Laguna Beach in July 1953 with a co-star role in Lo and Behold. He did another original play, Music in the Distance, at Laguna in September 1953, in which he most favorably impressed the reviewer.

=== Television and film 1954–1958 ===
With 1954 the focal point of Bryant's performances swung permanently to television, while his film career remained negligible, a string of uncredited bit parts. He did a dozen TV episodes that year, including three for The Loretta Young Show, and two for Schlitz Playhouse of Stars. He also handled leading roles in three week-long productions at the Laguna Beach Playhouse during the summer. The following year he had fourteen appearances on television, all but three for anthology series. He also performed on stage in My Three Angels for a weeklong run in Phoenix.

For 1956 Bryant again did fourteen episodes of television, a large number for any actor not playing a regular on a series. For most of these appearances he was either the lead or a featured performer. His tally of TV episodes dipped slightly in 1957, as he had a flurry of film roles that year. Three were uncredited, one was a short subject, but Courage of Black Beauty marked his first lead film role. The following year he had his second lead film role, albeit for an independent Christian-themed production with a limited distribution, I'll Give My Life. He also did nearly a dozen television episodes in 1958, and the play Dream Girl.

=== Television and film 1959–1962 ===
By 1959 anthology shows share of television had diminished in favor of narrative series with continuing casts. Bryant also rode this trend, doing three episodes of Perry Mason, playing a different character on each. He did six other television shows that year, as well as a film, The Bat.

His only other film role of consequence during this period was as a neglectful husband to Kim Novak in Strangers When We Meet. His mainstay was television; he did twenty-five episodes on nearly as many series from 1960 through 1962.

=== The Virginian and later television ===
Beginning in 1963 Bryant had a long-running recurring role on the top-rated series The Virginian. For five years he played Dr. Carl Spalding (Note: The show was inconsistent about the spelling of the last name in credits, sometimes rendering it as "Spaulding". However, the nameplate on the outside of the doctor's office on the set had "Spalding".) in this 90-minute western, performing in two dozen episodes. He had other television work during these years, appearing on Dr. Kildare, The Man from U.N.C.L.E., My Three Sons, Run for Your Life, Dragnet 1967, and The Mod Squad among others. During the fall of 1969 he appeared in the pilot episode of a new series called The New People. This was his last screen performance for nearly twenty years, until he appeared in a single episode of Highway to Heaven during early 1988. However, he continued to act in stage productions in the Southern California area, and had completed a run in Very Nearly a Pinter just two months before his death from cancer on July 13, 1989.

== Personal life ==
While studying at the Art Institute of Chicago, Bryant met a model named Janet Remick, who was from Massachusetts. They were married in 1941, and initially lived with Bryant's parents in Milwaukee. The couple had a daughter Brittony in 1942, but divorced in 1946.

== Stage performances ==
Listed by year of first performance (excluding student productions)
Year	Play	Role	Venue	Notes
1944	Hamlet	Horatio	Military Touring Company	This was an Army production of the famous G.I. Hamlet, devised by and starring Major Maurice Evans.
1945	Hamlet	Francisco	Boston Opera House; Columbus Circle Theater	The G.I. Hamlet was commercially produced by Michael Todd, with Maurice Evans, Lili Darvas, Thomas Gomez, Walter Coy, Alexander Lockwood, Frances Reid, Thomas Chalmers, and Emmett Rogers.
1952	Willow Whistle	Robert Tomlin	Laguna Beach Playhouse	Original summer fantasy by Frances Wetmore. Bryant starred, with David Stollery, Betty Paul, Michael Hayes, Bach Mantell, Glenn Wells, and Maryanne O. Neil.
1953	Nightshade		Pasadena Playhouse	Original chiller by Ken Englund and Sidney Fields. Bryant, Paula Raymond, and George Reeves starred, with Jack Hill, Evelyn Scott, Louise Lorimer, Natividad Vacío, George Truitt, and Harris Brown.
1953	Lo and Behold	Dr. Robert Dorsey	Laguna Beach Playhouse	Broadway comedy in its West Coast premiere, starred Douglas Wood, with Bryant in the co-star role. Also with Regina Gleason, Sandra Stone, Joseph Paul, and Stephen Coit.
1953	Music in the Distance		Laguna Beach Playhouse	Original play by Patterson Greene; starred Bryant, Charlotte Fletcher, Sandra Stone and Maury Hill, with Louise Lorimer and Stephen Coit.
1954	The Deep Blue Sea	Freddie Page	Laguna Beach Playhouse	Erin O'Brien-Moore starred, supported by Bryant and Glen Wells, with Stephen Coit, Connie Wells, Robert Hafner, Charleen Ward, and Skip Fickling.
1954	The Moon Is Blue	Donald Gresham	Laguna Beach Playhouse	Joan Evans and Edward Ashley co-starred, with Bryant featured in this four-character play.
1954	The Little Hut	Henry Brittingham-Brett	Laguna Beach Playhouse	Bryant, Elizabeth Paul, and Maury Hill starred, with Fred Nilsoon and Jack Beavers.
1955	My Three Angels	Paul	Sombrero Playhouse	Starring Thomas Gomez, Henry Brandon, Liam Sullivan, with Carl Harbord, Margaret Wells, Elinor Donahue, Louis Martin, Barbara Morrison, Mark Herron.
1958	Dream Girl	Clark Redfield	Palm Springs Playhouse (Note: In 1958 it was located on South Sunrise Way at Ramon Road)	Starring Julia Meade, with Loyal Lukas, Jesse Glendining, John Bonitz, Lynn Bailey.
1987	Jitters		Gnu Theater (Note: This was located at 10426 Magnolia Blvd in North Hollywood.)	Backstage comedy by David French has Bryant and others as feuding professionals in a Toronto theater.
1989	Very Nearly a Pinter		Actors Alley Theater (Note: This was located at 4334 Van Nuys Blvd in Sherman Oaks.)	One act drawing room parody by Maximilian Bocek has Bryant playing a semi-senile English eccentric.

== Filmography ==
Film (by year of first release)
Year	Title	Role	Notes
1950	Dial 1119	Reporter	Uncredited
1951	The Mating Season	Wedding Usher/Party Guest	Uncredited
1951	Inside Straight	Wagon Captain	Uncredited
1951	Darling, How Could You!	Lieutenant	Uncredited
1951	A Millionaire for Christy	Wedding Usher	Uncredited
1952	Red Snow	Enemy Pilot Alex	His first credited and named role in film.
1953	From Here to Eternity	Capt. G.R. Ross	Uncredited. Bryant plays the officer taking over when Capt. Holmes (Philip Ober) is relieved of command.
1954	Johnny Dark	Patrolman	Uncredited
1955	To Hell and Back	Jim Houston	Uncredited
1955	Two Sons (Note: The working title was The Unfinished Task, which was later reused by the production company for a different story)	Denny Bennett	Bryant and Wright King play sons of John Hoyt. Christian-themed independent short produced by Family Films.
1957	Four Girls in Town (Note: Working title was Star Light, Star Bright at first, then Star Light, later Four Bright Girls)	Young Man	Uncredited
1957	The 27th Day	Federal Agent Kelly	Uncredited
1957	Courage of Black Beauty	Sam Adams	A rare lead role for Bryant, though for a Grade B film. With Johnny Crawford, Mimi Gibson, Diane Brewster, Russell Johnson, J. Pat O'Malley, Ziva Rodann, Nancy Abbate.
1957	Man of a Thousand Faces	William R. Darrow Jr	Uncredited
1957	Book of Israel		Religious-themed independent short produced by Family Films. With Robert Shayne, Joan Woodbury, John Marshall, Michael Ross, Claudia Drake, Maxine Jennings.
1958	Run Silent, Run Deep	Carl Beckman	Uncredited.
1958	The Last Hurrah	Man at Campaign HQ	Uncredited.
1958	I'll Give My Life (Note: Some sources have this released in 1960, but newspaper ads show it playing as early as December 1958.)	James W. Bradford	Bryant has the lead for this feature length Christian-themed independent film. With Ray Collins, Angie Dickinson, Donald Woods.
1959	Where Your Treasure Is		Congregationalist-themed short starring John Litel.
1959	The Bat	Mark Fleming	Bryant plays nephew of murdered bank president.
1959	Never So Few	Gen. Sloan's Aide	Uncredited
1959	Front Page Bible	Bill Adams	
1960	The House Hunters	David Blair	Bryant plays prospective home buyer in this 16mm color short produced for NAR. With Edward Everett Horton, Douglas Kennedy, William Bakewell, Helen Mowery, Sally Fraser.
1960	Bells Are Ringing	Doorman	Uncredited
1960	Strangers When We Meet	Ken Gault	Bryant negelcts wife Kim Novak so married architect Kirk Douglas dallies with her.
1961	The Marriage-Go-Round	Young Professor	Uncredited
1961	The Flight that Disappeared	Hank Norton	
1961	Twist Around the Clock	Harry Davis	
1962	Walk on the Wild Side	Spence	
1964	To Trap a Spy	Henchman	Uncredited
1965	Those Calloways	Doug	Uncredited
1965	Runaway Girl		
1969	Winning		Uncredited; his final known film role.

=== Television performances ===
Television (in original broadcast order, excluding commercials)
Year	Series	Episode	Role	Notes
1952	Big Town	The Hero	Nelson Karnes	
1952	The Lone Ranger	Best Laid Plans	Chick Thompson	
1954	Mr. & Mrs. North	Model for Murder	Robert Hastings	
1954	Four Star Playhouse	Masquerade	Sabin	Ida Lupino and fiancée Bryant are target of her ex- during Mardi Gras.
1954	Schlitz Playhouse	Something Wonderful	Paul Chalmers	Deceitful producer (Claude Dauphin) entices young hopeful (Marcia Patrick) into ignoring her beau (Bryant).
1954	Topper	The Wedding	Roger	
1954	The Loretta Young Show	No Help Wanted	Sgt. Nick Hummerstein	
1954	City Detective	Midnight Supper		
1954	The Loretta Young Show	It's a Man's Game	Dr. Lindy	
1954	Schlitz Playhouse	The Long Trail	Sam Gates	Anthony Quinn plays a Texas Ranger looking in Oregon for wanted man (Bryant).
1954	The Loretta Young Show	Our Sacred Honor	David Walton	
1954	Adventures of the Falcon	Invisible Destroyer	Lowell	
1954	The Lineup	Cop Shooting Story	Jack Lee	
1954	Waterfront	Troubled Waters	Dan Brennan	
1955	Studio 57	The Big Jump	Jim Clayton	Uranium prospecting couple (Bryant and Nancy Gates) fight off a claim jumper.
1955	The Loretta Young Show	600 Seconds	Andy Delaney	
1955	The Public Defender	A Pair of Gloves	Allen Logan	
1955	The Loretta Young Show	The Little Teacher	David Lindsay	
1955	Science Fiction Theatre	Y..O..R..D..	Warrant Officer Milligan	
1955	Studio 57	The Deadly Doubt	Paul	Employer wants to breakup office romance between Bryant and Laura Elliott
1955	The Millionaire	The Uncle Robby Story	Richard Curtis	Uncle Robby (Percy Helton) dies untimely for newlyweds Bryant and Barbara Bates.
1955	The Lone Ranger	The Sheriff's Wife	Sheriff Frank Russell	
1955	The Man Behind the Badge	The Case of Operation Sabotage	Pierce Torrington	
1955	Science Fiction Theatre	Target Hurricane	Lieutenant	
1955	TV Reader's Digest	The Voyage of Captain Tom Jones, Pirate	Captain Miles Standish	Louis Hayward stars, with Kathryn Beaumont, Noel Drayton, John Stephenson, Edward Colmans.
1955	This Is the Life	Too Late... Yet Not Too Late		Hot-tempered man (Bryant) regrets his angry words.
1955	Star Stage	The Girl Who Wasn't Wanted		
1955	Cavalcade of America	Barbed Wire Christmas	Fred	Bryant and Chuck Connors are Americans in German POW camp during Dec 1944.
1956	Cavalcade of America	The Boy Who Walked to America	Security Officer	
1956	Studio 57	Georgia Man	Maj. Sandie	Caught sleeping on guard duty, a Confederate soldier is given a second chance.
1956	The 20th Century Fox Hour	Crack-Up	Draftsman #2	
1956	Navy Log	Not a Leg to Stand On	Lt. Robbins	
1956	Schlitz Playhouse	Officer Needs Help	Lt. Lyle Smith	New police chief (Stephen McNally) tries to improve his poorly trained force.
1956	Studio 57	The Faithful Heart	Ralph	Woman battles small town hostility. With Teresa Wright, Gracie Fields, Isabel Withers, John Hamilton.
1956	Lux Video Theatre	She Married Her Boss	George	With Jan Sterling.
1956	Sunday Spectacular	The Road to Hollywood	Himself	Bob Hope NBC color special with host of stars.
1956	Schlitz Playhouse	Witness to Condemn	Tony Savage	Beaten blind by gangsters, girl hopes to see again. With Teresa Wright, Warren Stevens, Ray Walker.
1956	This Is the Life	The Voice Within	Al Walsh	Fatal fire caused by poor wiring haunts electrician (Bryant). With Forrest Taylor, Onslow Stevens, Nan Boardman, Jean Howell, James Seay.
1956	The Adventures of Dr. Fu Manchu	The Secret of Fu Manchu	Franklin Arnold Jr.	
1956	The Adventures of Jim Bowie	Natchez Trace	Samuel Cummings	Bowie escorts travelers to Natchez. With Ross Elliott, Brad Morrow, Havis Davenport.
1956	Lux Video Theatre	Because of You	Mike	
1956	State Trooper	Nevada Boy, Pride and Joy	Hank Greenlee	
1957	Father Knows Best	Short Wave	Skipper	
1957	This Is the Answer	Mission to Korea	Henry Fowler	Bryant plays reporter in this religious-themed drama for Sunday morning viewing.
1957	Code 3	The Rookie Sheriff	Lane	
1957	Navy Log	Ito of Attu	Doc	Navy doctor treats wounded Japanese soldier (Harold Fong) during WWII.
1957	Panic!	The Airline Hostess	Captain Jenkins	Enemy agent tries to flee by commercial airline. With Carolyn Jones and Paul Picerni.
1957	The Silent Service	The Trout at the Rainbow's End	Lt. Alvin H. Clark	
1957	This Is the Life	Design from Heaven	Pastor Dwyer	Polio-stricken woman loses hope of treatment. With Mary Lawrence, Alan Hale Jr., Linda Bennett, Herb Ellis.
1957	Official Detective	The Wristwatch	Reeves	
1957	Schlitz Playhouse	The Hole Card	Robert	Lady gambler (Tallulah Bankhead) feels her losing streak will soon end.
1958	Sgt. Preston of the Yukon	The Diamond Collar	Alex Kieth	
1958	Official Detective	Trail of Terror	Detective Ellery	
1958	The Adventures of McGraw	The Lie That Came True	Neal Denquist	Man (Charles Watts) invents fake crime to which another man (Bryant) confesses.
1958	The Gray Ghost	Contraband	Lattimore	
1958	The Silent Service	The U.S.S. Cod's Lost Boarding Party	Lt. Cmdr. Edward L. Westbrook	
1958	Schlitz Playhouse	Way of the West	Lt. Harry Ryan	Frontier town suffering from epidemic is also beset by gunmen.
1958	Schlitz Playhouse	False Alarm	Patrolman Kenny	Cabbie is forced into armored car heist. Stars Jack Carson, Janice Rule, Joseph Wiseman, with Madge Blake.
1958	Flight	Experiment Oxygen		
1958	How to Marry a Millionaire	A Job for Jesse	Dr. Strick	
1958	The Donna Reed Show	Guest in the House	Major Barker	Bryant plays father to runaway boy (Charles Herbert); with Stephen Courtleigh and John Reach.
1958	Yancy Derringer	Three Knaves from New Haven	Joshua Devon	
1959	Perry Mason	The Case of the Footloose Doll	Bob Wallace	Bryant phones in his only scene as an embezzling heel.
1959	Perry Mason	The Case of the Romantic Rogue	Stacy Chandler	Con-man (Bryant) falls for his mark.
1959	Lux Playhouse	The Case of the Two Sisters		
1959	Tightrope!	Getaway Day	Lt. Jackson	Bryant plays police officer after race track robbers.
1959	Border Patrol	Test of Strength	Goodwin	
1959	Perry Mason	The Case of the Watery Witness	George Clark	Bryant is accused of murdering an old-time movie star.
1959	M Squad	Another Face, Another Life	Albert Taylor	
1959	Laramie	Man of God	Husband	
1959	The Fat Man: The Thirty-Two Friends of Gina Lardelli	(TV Movie)	Larry Scott	
1960	The Donna Reed Show	The New Mother	Major Barker	Bryant reprises a character from a two-year old storyline.
1960	Johnny Midnight	Once Again	Mark Sanders	
1960	Laramie	Death Wind	Prison Guard	Uncredited.
1960	The Many Loves of Dobie Gillis	Room at the Bottom	Esmond Adams	Bryant and Jean Byron are parents to private school whiz kid (Ron Howard).
1960	Men Into Space	Is There Another Civilisation?	Maj. Bowers	
1960	Not for Hire	Uniformed Mugger	Grayson	
1960	The Comedy Spot	Meet the Girls	Ken Evans	Unsold pilot, starred Mamie Van Doren, Virginia Field, Gale Robbins.
1960	Perry Mason	The Case of the Nine Dolls	Larry Osborne	Bryant is revealed to be secret benefactor of orphan girl (Laurie Perreau).
1960	Coronado 9	A Bookie Is Not a Bibliophile	Frank Banner	
1960	The Ann Sothern Show	Secret Admirer	Dave Shelley	
1960	Shotgun Slade	The Lady and the Piano	Saloon Owner	
1961	The Islanders	Escape from Kaledau	Maxwell	Two castaways (Bryant and Henry Daniell) hijack a rescue plane and fly it to Kaledau.
1961	Lock-Up	End of a Titan		Attorney defends artist accused of murdering architect.
1961	Checkmate	Phantom Lover	Roland Devers	Young girl is being haunted.
1961	Coronado 9	Flee Now, Pay Later	Mike Telford	
1961	The Case of the Dangerous Robin	Falling Star		
1961	Mr. Ed	Pine Lake Lodge	Jerry	
1961	Sea Hunt	Imposter	Investigator Larrabee	
1961	Cain's Hundred	Blue Water, White Beach	Ronnie	
1961	Everglades!	Heat in Town	Whitney Luten	
1962	Checkmate	The Star System	The Leading Man	
1962	Perry Mason	The Case of the Crippled Cougar	Arnold Keith	No one could play a complete louse as well as Bryant.
1962	Wagon Train	The Charley Shutup Story	Cavalry Officer	
1962	Ripcord	The Helicopter Race	Owen's Boss	
1962	Saints and Sinners	Daddy's Girl	Hal Simmons	
1963	Ripcord	The Money Line	Stuart Langton	
1963	Perry Mason	The Case of the Prankish Professor	Mike Estridge	
1963	The Virginian	Say Goodbye to All That	Dr. Carl Spalding	Bryant's first of many recurring appearances on this show
1963	The Virginian	Vengenance Is the Spur	Dr. Carl Spalding	
1963	The Virginian	The Golden Door	Dr. Carl Spalding	
1963	The Eleventh Hour	Everybody Knows You Left Me	Ed	
1963	This Is the Life	When Parents Fail	Don Griffin	Religious-themed series
1963	The Virginian	The Evil That Men Do	Frank Mason	The only episode of this series in which Bryant performed as a character other than Dr. Spaulding
1963	Dr. Kildare	The Eleventh Commandmant	Mike Shipman	
1963	The Virginian	A Time Remembered	Dr. Carl Spalding	
1964	Wagon Train	The Michael Malone Story	The Doctor	
1964	The Virginian	The Thirty Days of Gavin Heath	Dr. Carl Spalding	Larger role than usual for Bryant as his character deals with a case of rabies.
1964	The Virginian	The Long Quest	Dr. Carl Spalding	
1964	The Virginian	A Bride for Lars	Dr. Carl Spalding	
1964	The Virginian	Dark Destiny	Dr. Carl Spalding	
1964	The Virginian	Ryker	Dr. Carl Spalding	
1964	The Virginian	Dark Challenge	Dr. Carl Spalding	
1964	The Virginian	The Hour of the Tiger	Dr. Carl Spalding	
1965	The Virginian	Two Men Named Laredo	Dr. Carl Spaulding	
1965	The Virginian	Hideout	Dr. Carl Spalding	
1965	The Virginian	Lost Yesterday	Dr. Carl Spalding	
1965	The Man from U.N.C.L.E.	The Four-Steps Affair	Henchman	An uncredited role
1965	The Virginian	Old Cowboy	Dr. Carl Spaulding	
1966	The Man from U.N.C.L.E.	The Minus-X Affair	Officer	
1966	The Man from U.N.C.L.E.	The Super-Colossal Affair	Hardy Twill	
1966	The Monroes	Ordeal By Hope	Doctor	Once again Bryant is a frontier doctor dealing with rabies.
1966	The Virginian	Beloved Outlaw	Dr. Carl Spaulding	
1967	The Virginian	Doctor Pat	Dr. Carl Spaulding	Spalding (Bryant) acquires a female colleague (Jill Donohue), and a wife (Jacqueline Mayo), for this episode only.
1967	The Virginian	The Girl on the Pinto	Dr. Carl Spaulding	
1967	The Virginian	The Strange Quest of Claire Bingham	Dr. Carl Spaulding	
1967	The Virginian	Johnny Moon	Dr. Carl Spaulding	
1967	The Virginian	Bitter Autumn	Dr. Carl Spaulding	
1967	My Three Sons	Ernie, the Bluebeard	Jim Walters	
1968	The Virginian	Stacey	Dr. Carl Spaulding	Spalding (Bryant) calls in a specialist (Robert H. Harris) for a case of partial paralysis.
1968	Run for Your Life	The Exchange	Charles Stuyvesant	Bryant's character is held prisoner behind the Iron Curtain.
1968	Dragnet 1967	Robbery: DR-15	Ray	
1968	The Virginian	Nora	Dr. Carl Spaulding	
1969	The Mod Squad	Shell Game	Dispatcher	
1969	The New People	Pilot	Pilot	Appearing as a pilot in this pilot episode, Bryant's character dies early.
1988	Highway to Heaven	Time in a Bottle	Chairman	How Bryant came to appear on this show after a 20-year absence from TV is unknown.
