= Steven Ritch =

American actor (1921–1995)

- Born: 26 December 1921; Providence, Rhode Island, US
- Died: 20 July 1995 (aged 73); Rogue River, Oregon, US
- Occupation: Actor

Steven Ritch (26 December 1921 – 20 July 1995) was an American actor, perhaps best known for his lead role in the 1956 film The Werewolf.

== Early life ==
Steven Ritch was born on December 26, 1921, in Providence, Rhode Island. Ritch served in the U.S. Army during World War II and fought on Guadalcanal in some of the worst battles.

== Career ==
Ritch's career ran from 1950 to 1962, and he had 45 acting credits in films and television.

He also worked as a screenwriter in feature films and television. He wrote the screenplay for the 1957 film Plunder Road, as well as acting in the movie, delivering a "stand-out performance as a nervous wheelman", according to CinemaScope.

He made his film debut with a small role in Destination Murder (1950), but it was his lead performance in The Werewolf (1956) that brought him broader recognition. In addition to acting, Ritch demonstrated his versatility by working as a screenwriter. He wrote the screenplay for the 1957 film Plunder Road, in which he also delivered a standout performance as a nervous wheelman, according to CinemaScope. His other notable film appearances include Murder by Contract (1958), City of Fear (1959), and Studs Lonigan (1960). Beyond his film work, Ritch made significant contributions to television, appearing in popular series such as Wagon Train, 77 Sunset Strip, The Rifleman (as Joe Hyatt in S1 E40 "The Mind Reader" 1959),Death Valley Days, The Lone Ranger, and Sea Hunt. His television writing credits include episodes for Combat! (1962–1967), Shannon, Adventures in Paradise, 77 Sunset Strip, and The Alaskans.

== Later life ==
Ritch died on July 20, 1995, in Rogue River, Oregon, aged 73.

== Selected filmography ==
- Destination Murder (1950) as Waiter
- Siren of Bagdad (1953) as A Soldier
- Valley of the Head Hunters (1953) as Lt. Barry
- Conquest of Cochise (1953) as Tukiwah
- The Great Adventures of Captain Kidd (1953) as Barrett
- The Battle of Rogue River (1954) as Indian
- Massacre Canyon (1954) as Black Eagle
- Riding with Buffalo Bill (1954) as Elko
- Seminole Uprising (1955) as Black Cat
- Apache Ambush (1955) as Townsman
- The Crooked Web (1955) as Ramon Torres
- The Werewolf (1956) as Duncan Marsh
- Bailout at 43,000 (1957) as Major Irv Goldman
- Plunder Road (1957) as Frankie Chardo
- Murder by Contract (1958) as Detective
- City of Fear (1959) as Dr. John Wallace
- Studs Lonigan (1960) as Gangster
