= Pressure Point (1962 film) =

1962 film by Hubert Cornfield

- Directed by: Hubert Cornfield
- Screenplay by: Hubert Cornfield; S. Lee Pogostin
- Based on: The Fifty-Minute Hour; 1955 casebook by Robert Mitchell Lindner
- Produced by: Stanley Kramer
- Starring: Sidney Poitier; Bobby Darin
- Cinematography: Ernest Haller
- Edited by: Frederic Knudtson
- Music by: Ernest Gold
- Production company: Larcas Productions
- Distributed by: United Artists
- Release date: December 2, 1962
- Running time: 91 minutes
- Country: United States
- Language: English
- Budget: less than $1 million
- Box office: $665,000

Pressure Point is a 1962 American psychological drama film directed and co-written by Hubert Cornfield. It stars Sidney Poitier and Bobby Darin, about a prison psychiatrist treating an American Nazi sympathizer during World War II.

== Plot ==
The film begins at a psychiatric institution in 1962. A young doctor (Peter Falk) on a staff headed by a senior psychiatrist (Sidney Poitier) is frustrated with his patient, who is black and detests him because he is white. The doctor has been trying for a breakthrough for 7 1/2 months and feels he cannot go on; he demands that his patient be assigned to another psychiatrist. The senior psychiatrist, who is black, then tells of having an experience 20 years earlier in 1942 with a Nazi sympathizer at a federal penitentiary where he then worked as a psychiatrist.

In a flashback, a new prisoner (Bobby Darin) arrives and is assigned to the doctor. The doctor soon discovers the prisoner is racist, and was arrested for sedition due to his Nazi sympathies. The patient taunts the doctor, who responds, "I'd like to kill you, but I want to help you."

The prisoner has a sleep disorder and blackouts and, over time, is prodded to discuss trauma he experienced throughout his life, particularly in childhood at the hands of his father and through the weakness of his mother. These events are shown as flashbacks. The prisoner describes how, while impoverished during the Great Depression, he met an attractive young woman who was kind to him and seemed interested in a relationship, but her father puts a stop to the budding romance. The prisoner saw that the family was Jewish, and this - clearly in tandem with his other serious personality problems - leads him to Nazism.

Against the doctor's recommendation, the psychiatric staff decide to parole the prisoner. They insist the doctor is biased because of the inmate's racism and devotion to Nazism.

Back in the present day, the senior doctor reveals that the Nazi prisoner was released, and was some years later executed for beating an old man to death for no reason. The young psychiatrist then vows to continue working with his difficult patient.

== Cast ==
- Sidney Poitier as Doctor, Chief Psychiatrist
- Bobby Darin as Patient
- Peter Falk as Young Psychiatrist
- Carl Benton Reid as Chief Medical Officer
- Mary Munday as Bar Hostess
- Barry Gordon as Boy Patient
- Howard Caine as Tavern Owner
- Gilbert Green as Jewish Father
- Anne Barton as Mother
- James Anderson as Father
- Richard Bakalyan as Jimmy
- Lynn Loring as Jewish Girl
- Yvette Vickers as Drunken Woman

== Production ==
The film was produced under the working title Point Blank, and was based on the 1955 casebook "The Fifty-Minute Hour" by Robert Lindner. The characters are not identified in the cast list by name, but only as doctor, patient and so on.

Poitier believed that Stanley Kramer cast him for political reasons, i.e. placing a black man in a role that wasn't race-specific, believing that it was more important than any box office. In his autobiography, he noted "obviously a picture about a black psychiatrist treating white patients was not the kind of sure-fire package that would send audiences rushing into theatres across the country. But Kramer had other gods to serve, and he was faithful to them."

== Reception ==
Leonard Maltin gave the film a three-star review, calling it an "intelligent drama". The New York Times described the film as "burning with sincerity" but "almost completely misguided," criticized the frequent flashbacks as "shrill, flaring and heavily melodramatic," and concluded that "the ugly truths" of the film "are blunted with too many theatrical contrivances."

Critic David Marriott wrote in 2007 that, in the early scene between Falk and Poitier, the film "hovers on a white failure to cope with black hatred, but that hatred is immediately revealed to be a sign of personal pathology. As a pathology it need not be associated with liberal ideology—the idea that blacks hating whites has no ontological or political validity other than as a symptom." Marriott notes that the film makes an association "between the black boy's anger at the white man—a therapist who, it seems, symbolizes the law that kills his father, the sex that used his mother—and the virulent racism directed at a black psychiatrist by the fascist."

== Notes ==
The film recorded a loss of $991,000.

== See also ==
- List of American films of 1962
