= Jon Shepodd =

American actor

- Shepodd in the Lassie TV series (1957)
- Born: Manley Hugh Goodwin Jr. December 19, 1927; Birmingham, Alabama, US
- Died: August 16, 2017 (aged 89); London, England
- Occupation: Actor
- Years active: 1952–1964

Hugh Goodwin (December 19, 1927 – August 16, 2017), better known as Jon Shepodd, was an American actor. On television, he was the first actor to play the role of Paul Martin in the long-running series Lassie Shepodd appeared as a guest star on Lassie in Season 3 in the episode "Lassie's Day" (broadcast February 10, 1957) as "Al" the delivery man for Martha's Bakery.

He was liked well enough to secure the main role of Timmy's father, Paul, in Season 4 when the series transitioned from the Miller family to the Martin family.

== Career ==
=== Lassie ===
As Paul Martin, Shepodd made his second Lassie series appearance in the middle of Season 4 in the episode "Transition" (broadcast December 1, 1957) playing opposite Cloris Leachman as his wife Ruth Martin. In this episode the Martin couple agrees to adopt Timmy, and to take over the farm for the departing Miller family, who are moving to the city after the death of Gramps. Lassie is given to Timmy by Jeff, and thus remains on the farm.

Both Shepodd and Leachman appeared for the remainder of the fourth season (27 episodes). Leachman, however, did not have a signed contract and left at the end of Season 4, citing her role was not challenging enough for her. The producers decided to release Shepodd in the wake of the departing Leachman as they felt casting him with a "new wife" would be difficult to explain to an audience composed mainly of children. The characters Paul and Ruth Martin were thereafter played by Hugh Reilly and June Lockhart.

=== Films ===
In the film Attack (1956), he plays Cpl. John Jackson, the orderly to the unpopular Captain Cooney (Eddie Albert). In an opening sequence, Jackson irritates the other men in the unit who are queuing up for coffee, when he jumps the queue. He appeared in such films as The Power of the Resurrection (1958), What Ever Happened to Baby Jane? (1962), and The Garment Jungle (1957).

== Death ==
Shepodd died in August 2017, in London at the age of 89.

== Filmography ==
Year	Title	Role	Notes
1953	The Mississippi Gambler	Bit Part	Uncredited
1955	The Return of Jack Slade	Johnny Turner	
1956	Attack	Corporal John Jackson - Fox Company (communications)	
1956	The Garment Jungle	Alfredi	Uncredited
1957	Dragoon Wells Massacre	Tom	
1957	Oregon Passage	Lieutenant Baird Dolby	
1958	The Power of the Resurrection	Jesus Christ	
1960	I'll Give My Life	Bob Conners	
1962	What Ever Happened to Baby Jane?	Police Officer #5	
1963	The Alfred Hitchcock Hour	Lieutenant Curtis Cane	Season 1 Episode 31: "Run for Doom"
