= Lure of the Swamp =

1957 film

- Theatrical release poster
- Directed by: Hubert Cornfield
- Screenplay by: William George
- Based on: novel by Gil Brewer
- Produced by: Sam Hersh executive E. J. Baumgarten associate William Claxton
- Starring: Marshall Thompson; Willard Parker; Joan Vohs; Jack Elam; Leo Gordon; Joan Lora
- Cinematography: Walter Strenge
- Edited by: Robert Fritch
- Music by: Paul Dunlap
- Color process: Black and white
- Production company: Regal Films
- Distributed by: 20th Century Fox
- Release date: May 1957
- Running time: 75 minutes
- Country: United States
- Language: English

Lure of the Swamp is a 1957 American adventure film directed by Hubert Cornfield and written by William George, based on the 1953 novel of the same name by Gil Brewer. The film stars Marshall Thompson, Willard Parker, Joan Vohs, Jack Elam, Leo Gordon and Joan Lora. The film was released in May 1957 by 20th Century-Fox.

== Cast ==
- Marshall Thompson as Simon Lewt
- Willard Parker as James Lister
- Joan Vohs as Cora Payne
- Jack Elam as Henry Bliss
- Leo Gordon as Steggins- Insurance Investigator
- Joan Lora as Evie Dee
- James Maloney as August Dee
- Myron Healy as Bank Guard
