= The Night of the Following Day =

1969 film by Richard Boone, Hubert Cornfield

- Directed by: Hubert Cornfield
- Written by: Hubert Cornfield; Robert Phippeny
- Based on: The Snatchers by Lionel White
- Produced by: Hubert Cornfield executive Jerry Gershwin; Elliott Kastner
- Starring: Marlon Brando; Richard Boone; Rita Moreno; Pamela Franklin; Jess Hahn
- Cinematography: Willy Kurant (as Willi Kurant)
- Edited by: Gordon Pilkington
- Music by: Stanley Myers
- Production company: Gina Productions
- Distributed by: Universal Pictures
- Release dates: February 19, 1969 (New York City); February 26, 1969 (Bismarck)
- Running time: 93 minutes
- Country: United States
- Languages: English; French
- Budget: $1.5 million

The Night of the Following Day is a 1969 American Technicolor crime film directed by Hubert Cornfield starring Marlon Brando and Richard Boone. Filmed in France, around Le Touquet, it tells the story of a kidnapped heiress being held hostage in a remote beachhouse on the coast of France.

== Plot ==
The film starts with a young woman (Franklin) on an airplane and a stewardess, Vi (Moreno) bending over her. As she leaves, we see a chauffeur, Bud (Brando), saying something to her which we do not hear. He puts her in the back of a Rolls-Royce and drives off. They stop at a junction and Leer (Boone) gets in. The woman realises she has been kidnapped.

Bud starts to have second thoughts. He tries to protect the woman when Leer gets out of control. Bud also has to deal with a lack of courage in himself, with the head of the operation (Wally) and Vi, who uses drugs and cannot be trusted.

Then things start to unravel. Leer kills all his partners-in-crime on their return with the ransom, the car catching fire. Bud, perhaps anticipating this betrayal, gets out early. Hiding on the beach, he is able to exact revenge and shoots Leer as he signals to a ship waiting to take him out of the country.

This is all revealed to be the woman's dream during her flight, sparked by Vi, the air hostess. The woman then meets Bud in the airport just as in her dream.

== Cast ==
- Marlon Brando as Bud, the Chauffeur
- Richard Boone as Leer
- Rita Moreno as Vi, the Blonde Air Stewardess
- Pamela Franklin as Girl
- Jess Hahn as Wally [the film credits list Hahn as 'Friendly']
- Gerard Buhr as Fisherman-Cop
- Jacques Marin as Bartender
- Huques Wanner as Father
- Al Lettieri as Pilot (as Al Lettier)
