= Plunder Road =

1957 film by Hubert Cornfield

- Theatrical release poster
- Directed by: Hubert Cornfield
- Screenplay by: Steven Ritch
- Story by: Steven Ritch; Jack Charney
- Produced by: Leon Chooluck; Laurence Stewart
- Starring: Gene Raymond; Jeanne Cooper; Wayne Morris
- Cinematography: Ernest Haller
- Edited by: Warren Adams; Jerry Young (as Jerry S. Young)
- Music by: Irving Gertz
- Production company: Regal Films
- Distributed by: 20th Century Fox
- Release date: December 5, 1957 (United States)
- Running time: 72 minutes
- Country: United States
- Language: English

Plunder Road is a 1957 American crime film noir directed by Hubert Cornfield and starring Gene Raymond, Jeanne Cooper and Wayne Morris.

== Plot ==
Five men carry out an elaborate plan to rob a gold shipment from a San Francisco-bound US mint train. To throw the police off the track, they split up and drive off in three different directions. Two of the gang's gold-laden trucks are captured by the police, but the third makes it all the way to Los Angeles, where Eddie (Raymond) melts down the gold and disguises it as fittings for his luxury car. On the verge of getting away, he is involved in a freeway accident.

== Cast ==
- Gene Raymond as Eddie Harris
- Jeanne Cooper as Fran Werner
- Wayne Morris as Commando Munson
- Elisha Cook Jr. as Skeets Jonas (as Elisha Cook)
- Stafford Repp as Roly Adams
- Steven Ritch as Frankie Chardo
- Nora Hayden as Hazel
- Helene Heigh as Society Woman
- Harry Tyler as Ernie Beach
- Charles J. Conrad as Trooper No. 2 (as Charles Conrad)
- Paul Harber as Trooper No. 1
- Don Garrett as Policeman
- Michael Fox as Smog Officer / Voice of Radio Reporter John Oliver
- Richard Newton as Guard No. 2
- Jim Canino as Tibbs
- Robin Riley as Don
- Douglas Bank as Guard No. 1 / Narrator

== Production ==
The film was known as The Violent Road and filming started July 15 at the Kling Studios.

== See also ==
- List of American films of 1957
