= Attack (1956 film) =

1956 American war film directed by Robert Aldrich

Attack!
- Theatrical release poster
- Directed by: Robert Aldrich
- Screenplay by: James Poe
- Based on: Fragile Fox; 1954 play by Norman Brooks
- Produced by: Robert Aldrich
- Starring: Jack Palance; Eddie Albert; Lee Marvin; William Smithers; Robert Strauss; Buddy Ebsen
- Cinematography: Joseph F. Biroc
- Edited by: Michael Luciano
- Music by: Frank De Vol
- Production company: The Associates & Aldrich Company
- Distributed by: United Artists
- Release date: October 17, 1956
- Running time: 107 minutes
- Country: United States
- Language: English
- Budget: $810,000
- Box office: $2 million (US, CAN); 1,493,421 admissions (France)

Attack, also known as Attack!, is a 1956 American war film directed by Robert Aldrich and starring Jack Palance, Eddie Albert, Lee Marvin, William Smithers, Robert Strauss, Richard Jaeckel, Buddy Ebsen and Peter van Eyck. The cinematographer was Joseph Biroc.

"A cynical and grim account of war", the film is set in the latter stages of World War II and tells the story of a front-line combat unit led by a cowardly captain clearly out of his depth, as well as a tougher subordinate and an executive officer who both threaten to do away with him. As the official trailer put it: "Not every gun is pointed at the enemy!"

The film won the 1956 Italian Film Critics Award.

== Plot ==
Fox Company, a US Army National Guard infantry unit fighting in Belgium during World War II, is led by Captain Erskine Cooney (Eddie Albert). Lieutenant Joe Costa (Jack Palance) sends a squad to take a pillbox but Cooney freezes at the critical moment, and the squad is cut to pieces without supporting fire. Cooney's second in command, Lieutenant Harold Woodruff (William Smithers) is the "voice of reason" who tries to keep the peace between Cooney and Costa. Fox Company reports to battalion commander Lieutenant-Colonel Clyde Bartlett (Lee Marvin), a career officer intent on leveraging Cooney's family ties for political gain after the war. Woodruff is unable to convince Bartlett to reassigned Cooney to a desk job he is better suited for, and is told the war is nearly over and the company is unlikely to see combat again.

When the Germans launch the Battle of the Bulge, Bartlett orders Cooney's company to seize the town of La Nelle. Woodruff's attack order is countermanded by Cooney who orders Costa to lead a reconnaissance mission. Costa's platoon encounters suffers heavy casualties coming under heavy fire as it approaches La Nelle from German tanks and mortars. Costa takes refuge with the survivors, including platoon sergeant Tolliver and privates Bernstein, Ricks and Snowden. Costa calls for the reinforcements he was promised, but Cooney ignores the request and begins drinking. German tanks start shelling the house forcing Costa to retreat. He furiously radios Woodruff to warn Cooney he's "coming back!"

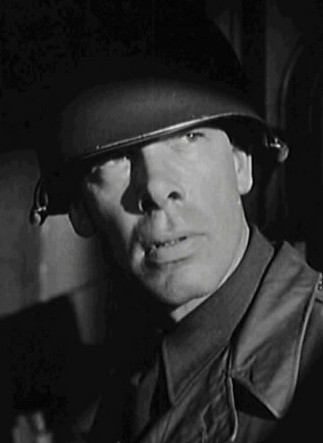
Lee Marvin as the manipulative colonel

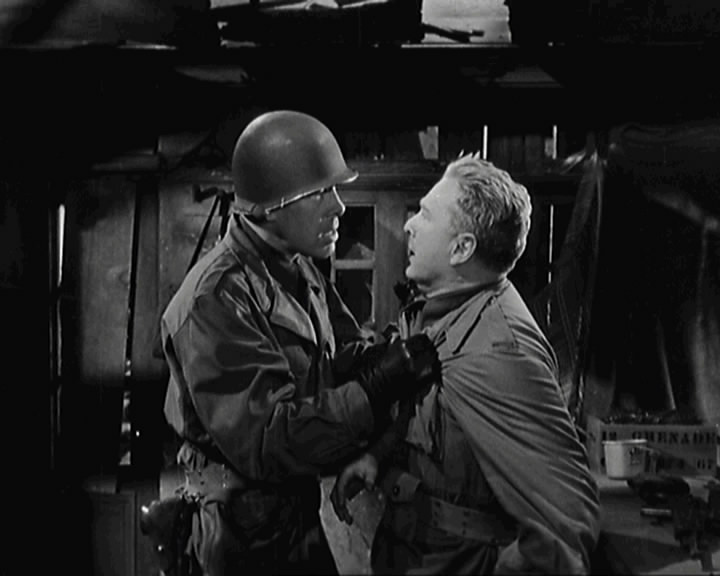
Lee Marvin and Eddie Albert

A German barrage hits the platoon as it pulls out and Costa attempts to drag the wounded Ricks to safety. He dies in Costa's arms and Costa goes missing in action. Bartlett confronts Cooney in his command post, reprimands him for not leading his entire company into action, and orders them to defend against the strong German counter-attack force approaching. Bartlett threatens to arrest Cooney if he pulls out and leaves their flanking company unprotected, which would threaten the entire front line. Cooney begs to be reassigned, and Bartlett strikes him.

Cooney has a mental breakdown and Woodruff sends him to sleep it off so he can assume command. Costa arrives at the command post determined to kill Cooney. Their argument is interrupted by Corporal Jackson's message that the town is being overrun and Costa's survivors are cut off. Costa races to their sector with a bazooka and disables one German tank before his arm is crushed by another.

Woodruff, Tolliver, Bernstein, Jackson, Snowden (Richard Jaeckel) and Cooney take refuge in a basement. Cooney orders the men to surrender and leaves the basement to give up. He encounters Costa, his mangled arm dangling uselessly, who collapses to the ground and appeals to God for the enough strength to kill Cooney. He dies, and Cooney again orders the survivors to surrender. Woodruff angrily refuses, knowing they face SS troops and the wounded Bernstein is Jewish. Cooney insists on surrendering, and Woodruff shoots him dead to prevent him from giving away their position. The men refuse Woodruff's request that he be arrested, and instead fire into Cooney's body to prevent Woodruff from assuming blame. They learn that American reinforcements have forced the Germans away from the town.

Bartlett arrives to speak to Cooney, and is told he was killed by the Germans. Bartlett talks to Woodruff alone and tries to bribe him with a field promotion to captain. When Bartlett announces he's going to nominate Cooney for the Distinguished Service Cross, Woodruff accuses Bartlett of orchestrating the entire confrontation to get rid of Cooney and gain favour with his powerful father. Bartlett tells Woodruff he has much to lose if the truth comes out and promises a medal for Costa as well. Woodruff decides the best way to honour Costa is to submit a truthful report to the division commander, General Parsons, and he makes contact by radio.

== Cast ==
- Jack Palance as 2nd Lt. Joe Costa
- Eddie Albert as Capt. Erskine Cooney
- Lee Marvin as Lt. Col. Clyde Bartlett
- William Smithers as 2nd Lt. Harold "Harry" Woodruff
- Robert Strauss as PFC. Bernstein
- Richard Jaeckel as Pvt. Snowden
- Buddy Ebsen as T/Sgt. Tolliver
- Jon Shepodd as Cpl. John Jackson
- Peter van Eyck as SS Captain
- Jim Goodwin as PFC. Ricks
- Steven Geray as Otto, German NCO
- Jud Taylor as Pvt. Jacob R. Abramowitz (credited as Judson Taylor)
- Strother Martin as Sgt. Ingersol

== Production ==
The film was based on Norman Brooks' stage play Fragile Fox. It was directed by Herbert Bayard Swope, Jr. and starred Dane Clark as Lt. Costa, Don Taylor as 2nd Lt./Capt. Woodruff, James Gregory as Lt. Col Bartlett, Andrew Duggan as Capt. Cooney, Crahan Denton as T/Sgt Tolliver, Robert McQueeney as Pvt. Sneider, Clement Fowler as Pvt. Bernstein and Jason Wingreen as PFC. Snowden. The play toured Cincinnati and Philadelphia then came into New York at the Belasco Theatre where after six weeks it folded.

Director Aldrich bought the rights when he failed to obtain those for Irwin Shaw's The Young Lions and Norman Mailer's The Naked and the Dead.

Aldrich never saw the play on stage but had read it and liked what it said about war.

Owing to the nature of the film, which cast some officers as either cowards or Machiavellian manipulators, the US Defense Department refused to grant production assistance. Critics attacked this attitude, pointing out the heroic and noble behaviour of other officers like Costa and Woodruff who were "more representative of the Army than the cowardly captain, who is clearly an exception."

Aldrich said, "The Army saw the script and promptly laid down a policy of no cooperation, which not only meant that I couldn't borrow troops and tanks for my picture - I couldn't even get a look at Signal Corps combat footage. I finally had to buy a tank for $1,000 and rent another from 20th Century-Fox."

Rehearsals began on 5 January and filming started on 15 January.

Aldrich directed Attack! without the big budget that other war productions were getting at the time. It was shot in 32 days on the back lot of RKO Studios with a small cast and budget and a few pieces of military equipment, including the two muchmodified US M3 light tanks that inadequately portrayed German tanks. Also, German troops wear WWI Stahlhelme.

The opening title sequence depicting off-duty soldiers was created by Saul Bass.

Eddie Albert, who played the cowardly Cooney, was in reality a decorated hero in the World War II Pacific Theater. Before the war he was secretly working for US Army intelligence, photographing German U-boats in Mexico. He was awarded the Bronze Star for heroism, rescuing US Marines during the Battle of Tarawa while under heavy gunfire in 1943. He also lost a portion of his hearing from the noise of the battle.

== Reception ==
According to Aldrich the film made money but because the profits were "cross-collateralized" against The Big Knife and "nobody saw any of the money."

Attack was named number 26 in Time Out's list of the 50 Best World War II movies. Acclaimed as "a minor landmark" by writer Adam Lee Davies, it was described thusly: "as cutting as piano wire and cynical to the core, Robert Aldrich’s whipsmart drama follows through on the queasy promise of its tagline: ‘Rips open the hot hell behind the glory!’"

== Accolades ==
The film is recognized by American Film Institute in these lists:

- 2001: AFI's 100 Years...100 Thrills – Nominated

== Home media ==
Attack was released to DVD by MGM Home Video on May 20, 2003 as a Region 1 fullscreen DVD and to Blu-ray on May 2, 2013 by the French company Filmedia (under license from MGM) as a Region 2 Blu-ray DVD.

== See also ==
- List of American films of 1956
