= Adventures of Sir Galahad =

1949 film by Spencer Gordon Bennet

- Directed by: Spencer Gordon Bennet
- Written by: George H. Plympton; Lewis Clay; David Mathews; Original screenplay
- Produced by: Sam Katzman
- Starring: George Reeves; Nelson Leigh; William Fawcett; Hugh Prosser; Lois Hall
- Cinematography: Ira H. Morgan
- Edited by: Dwight Caldwell; Earl Turner
- Music by: Mischa Bakaleinikoff; Musical director Marlin Skiles; Stock music (composer)
- Color process: Black and white
- Distributed by: Columbia Pictures
- Release date: December 22, 1949
- Running time: 252 minutes 15 episodes
- Country: United States
- Language: English
- Budget: $300,000–$400,000

Adventures of Sir Galahad is the 41st serial released in 1949 by Columbia Pictures. Directed by Spencer Gordon Bennet, it stars George Reeves, Nelson Leigh, William Fawcett, Hugh Prosser, and Lois Hall. It was based on Arthurian legend, one of the very few serials of the time with a period setting that was not a western.

== Plot ==
The Arthurian film cycle started with the Adventures of Sir Galahad serial. In this version, the youth Galahad, trying to emulate his father Sir Lancelot, wants fervently to be admitted to the Knights of the Round Table order. When he defeats Sir Bors and Sir Mordred in tournament, King Arthur agrees to knighthood, but only if Galahad can guard Excalibur for one night.

Unfortunately, during that night the sword is stolen by a mysterious personage known only as the Black Knight. Possession of Excalibur makes the holder invincible and without it the sovereignty of Arthur is endangered. Galahad is refused knighthood until the sword is found. Galahad, aided by Sir Bors, is hindered in his quest by Ulric, the Saxon King, who invades England, and by Merlin the magician, who harasses our hero at every turn.

Galahad suspects that the Black Knight is a traitor within Camelot who seeks the throne in alliance with the Saxons, while Morgan le Fay, Arthur's half sister and also a magician, helps him fight both Merlin's magic and the Saxons.

== Cast ==
- George Reeves as Sir Galahad. In the opinion of Cline, Reeves makes this a superior serial to Son of the Guardsman, another period serial made by the same studio.
- Nelson Leigh as King Arthur
- William Fawcett as Merlin
- Hugh Prosser as Sir Lancelot
- Lois Hall as Lady of the Lake
- Charles King as Sir Bors
- Pat Barton as Morgan le Fay
- Don Harvey as Bartog, Ulric's aide
- Jim Diehl as Sir Kay
- Marjorie Stapp as Queen Guinevere
- John Merton as Ulric, the Saxon king
- Pierce Lyden as Cawker
- Paul Frees as the Black Knight (voice)

== Chapter titles ==
1. The Stolen Sword
2. Galahad's Daring
3. Prisoners of Ulric
4. Attack on Camelot
5. Galahad to the Rescue
6. Passage of Peril
7. Unknown Betrayer
8. Perilous Adventure
9. Treacherous Magic
10. The Sorcerer's Spell
11. Valley of No Return
12. Castle Perilous
13. The Wizard's Revenge
14. Quest for the Queen
15. Galahad's Triumph

_{Source:}

== Production ==
The Adventures of Sir Galahad was based on Arthurian myth and legend, a setting that gave it "unique" opportunities for a serial. Sam Katzman said he was prompted to make it after reading a 1948 article which said J. Arthur Rank wanted to make a film about the Arthurian legend: "King Arthur and his knights are important to our kids. I knew what would happen. If Rank made the picture there would be too much history and not enough action and that would spoil it all. So I decided to make The Adventures of Sir Galahad."

Katzman elected not to feature the Holy Grail because "we don't want religious complications" and said there was some romance but not too much as "the kids don't want too much romance. We just suggest that Galahad might work something out later on."
