= The Power of the Resurrection =

- DVD cover
- Directed by: Harold D. Schuster
- Written by: Henry Denker
- Produced by: Henry Denker, Sam Hersh
- Starring: Richard Kiley; Jon Shepodd; Morris Ankrum
- Cinematography: Walter Strenge
- Edited by: Robert Fritch
- Music by: Paul Dunlap
- Color process: Technicolor
- Production company: Family Films
- Distributed by: Modern Sound Pictures Inc.
- Release date: 1958
- Running time: 58 minutes
- Country: United States
- Language: English

The Power of the Resurrection is a 1958 American feature film directed by Harold D. Schuster and starring Richard Kiley, Jon Shepodd, Morris Ankrum. The film is also known as The Passion and the Power of the Christ.

== Plot ==
A young man soon facing the death sentence for his Christian faith shares his fears with Peter. Peter faces the same fate and tells the man about his own fear that he felt after Jesus was arrested in the garden of Gethsemane, when he had to deny his knowing of Jesus for three times. However, Jesus still told Peter that he would be the rock on which the Church would be built.

== Cast ==
- Richard Kiley as Peter
- Jon Shepodd as Jesus Christ
- Jan Arvan as Judas
- Morris Ankrum as Annas
- Robert Cornthwaite as Caiaphus
- Stephen Joyce as John
- Booth Colman as James
- Dorothy Morris as Mary, Sister of Lazarus
- Charles Maxwell as Investigator
- Dan Riss as Thomas
- John Zaremba as Samuel
- Charles Wagenheim as Merchant
- Gilman Rankin as Joseph of Arimathea
- Judd Holdren as Temple Officer
