= Nelson Leigh =

American actor (1905–1985)

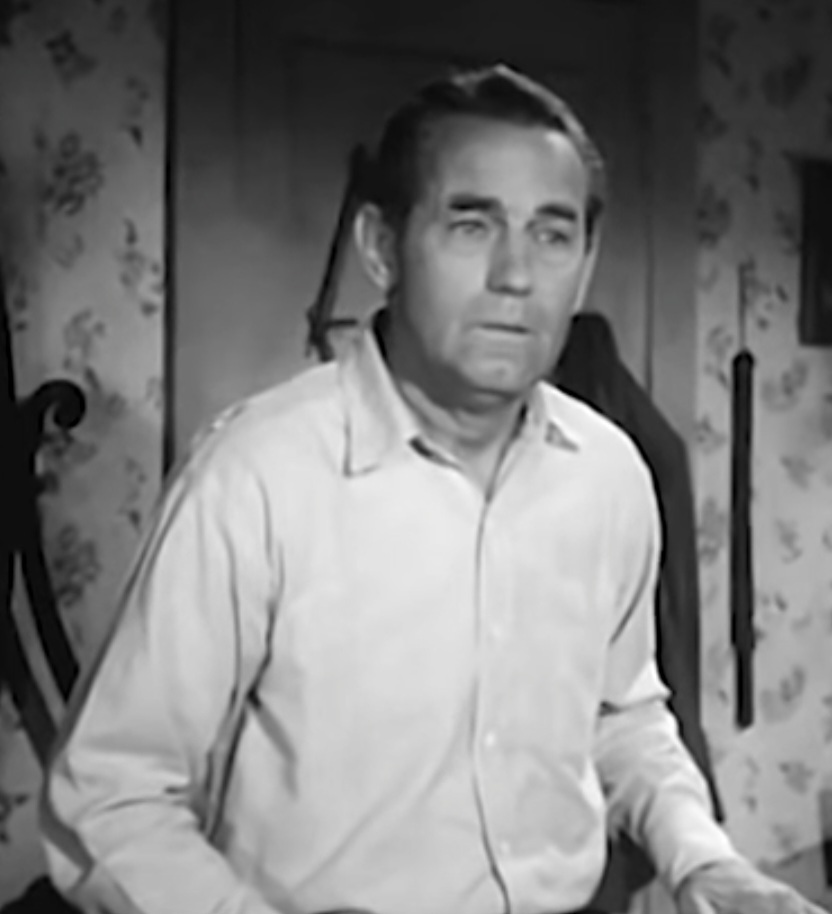
- Tobey in Ma Barker's Killer Brood (1960)
- Born: Sydney Talbot Christie; January 1, 1905; Mississippi, U.S.
- Died: July 3, 1985 (aged 80); Hemet, California, U.S.
- Occupation: Actor
- Years active: 1943–1974
- Spouse: Lois Cecile Johnson (m. 1928)
- Children: 1

Nelson Leigh (born Sydney Talbot Christie; January 1, 1905 – July 3, 1985) was an American motion picture actor of the 1940s and 1950s.

== Early years ==
Born in Mississippi, Leigh was the son of Mr. and Mrs. Harry Christie. He was a graduate of the University of Southern California, class of 1929.

== Career ==
Leigh appeared on Broadway in Hamlet (1945).

Leigh made over 130 appearances in motion pictures of the 1940s and 1950s, mainly in supporting roles. On stage, Leigh portrayed Jesus Christ for many years in the annual production of the Pilgrimage Play in the Hollywood Pilgrimage Bowl. This typecast Nelson Leigh in religious and medieval roles; in 1949 he played King Arthur in the adventure serial The Adventures of Sir Galahad. That same year he appeared in an early syndicated television film, a notoriously low-budgeted half-hour adaptation of Charles Dickens's A Christmas Carol with Vincent Price as narrator and Taylor Holmes as Ebenezer Scrooge (and the young Jill St. John as one of Bob Cratchit's daughters); Leigh played the Ghost of Christmas Past. He played Jesus Christ in a Christian film The Living Bible, and the Apostle Paul in the "Life of St. Paul" series and again in the "Acts of the Apostles" series. He played priests in various films, including Angels' Alley (1947) with The Bowery Boys, and the western Jesse James vs. the Daltons (1954). He made regular appearances in the Christian television anthology series, This Is the Life, in the recurring role of Pastor Martin. He also appeared in costume dramas.

His calm demeanor often landed him roles as military officers and other authority figures. He appeared in the cult science-fiction movie World Without End as Dr. Gailbraithe. Later in his career he appeared mainly on television, such as in a 1950 episode (#21) of the TV series The Lone Ranger, the 1955 anthology series Police Call and in popular TV shows such as Perry Mason (often seen as a judge), Bonanza, and The F.B.I.

== Recognition ==
In 1949, the American Association of Religious Film Directors gave Leigh its Best Actor Award for his portrayal of the Christus in The Calling of Matthew. In 1953, he won a "Christian Oscar" from the National Evangelistic Film Foundation for his work in two series, The Living Bible and This Is the Life.

== Selected filmography ==
- Appointment in Berlin (1943) - Civilian (uncredited)
- First Comes Courage (1943) - Blake (uncredited)
- The Man from Down Under (1943) - Man in Sydney Pub (uncredited)
- Sahara (1943) - British Soldier (uncredited)
- Corvette K-225 (1943) - Naval Officer (uncredited)
- Lassie Come Home (1943) - Joe's Teacher (uncredited)
- The Return of the Vampire (1943) - Sir Frederick's Office Assistant (uncredited)
- A Guy Named Joe (1943) - Man (uncredited)
- What a Woman! (1943) - Reporter (uncredited)
- Texas Masquerade (1944) - James Corwin
- Two-Man Submarine (1944) - Naval Officer (uncredited)
- Jam Session (1944) - Vincent Blake (uncredited)
- The Girl in the Case (1944) - Fred (uncredited)
- Follow the Boys (1944) - Bull Fiddler (uncredited)
- The White Cliffs of Dover (1944) - British Naval Officer (uncredited)
- Louisiana Hayride (1944) - Wiffle - Makeup Artist
- Mr. Winkle Goes to War (1944) - Army Doctor (uncredited)
- U-Boat Prisoner (1944) - Destroyer Lt. Hagen (uncredited)
- Meet Miss Bobby Socks (1944) - Henry Bricker (uncredited)
- Tonight and Every Night (1945) - British Army Officer (uncredited)
- It's a Pleasure (1945) - Waiter (scenes deleted)
- Identity Unknown (1945) - Col. F.A. Marlin
- Son of Lassie (1945) - Flight Coordinator (uncredited)
- Cornered (1945) - Dominion Official (uncredited)
- The Sailor Takes a Wife (1945) - Canadian Officer (uncredited)
- The Bandit of Sherwood Forest (1946) - Robin Hood's Man (uncredited)
- Brick Bradford (1947, Serial) - Edward Preston (uncredited)
- Angels' Alley (1948) - Father O'Hanlon
- The Black Arrow (1948) - Guard (uncredited)
- Superman (1948, Serial) - Jor-El (uncredited)
- The Gallant Blade (1948) - D'Emery (uncredited)
- Congo Bill (1948, Serial) - Dr. Greenway
- Racing Luck (1948) - Hendricks
- The Fighting O'Flynn (1949) - Officer (uncredited)
- The Lost Tribe (1949) - Zoron
- Barbary Pirate (1949) - Rindeff
- Jolson Sings Again (1949) - Theater Manager (uncredited)
- Adventures of Sir Galahad (1949, Serial) - King Arthur
- The Pilgrimage Play (1949) - Jesus of Nazareth
- Life of St. Paul Series (1949) - St. Paul
- Captive Girl (1950) - Reverend E.R. Holcom (uncredited)
- Rogues of Sherwood Forest (1950) - Baron Benedict (uncredited)
- Home Town Story (1951) - Dr. Johnson
- Yukon Manhunt (1951) - Jim Kenmore
- Hurricane Island (1951) - Padre
- Submarine Command (1951) - Gen. Whitehead (uncredited)
- Bugles in the Afternoon (1952) - Maj. Reno (uncredited)
- Thief of Damascus (1952) - Ben Jammal
- Magnificent Adventure (1952)
- Savage Mutiny (1953) - Dr. Parker
- Split Second (1953) - Scientist at Control Station (uncredited)
- Valley of Head Hunters (1953) - Mr. Bradley
- The Great Adventures of Captain Kidd (1953, Serial) - Robert Langdon [Chs. 1–3, 13-15] (uncredited)
- Prisoners of the Casbah (1953) - Emir (uncredited)
- Jack Slade (1953) - Alf Slade
- Texas Bad Man (1953) - Bradley
- Jesse James vs. the Daltons (1954) - Father Kerrigan
- Drums of Tahiti (1954) - Minister (uncredited)
- The Saracen Blade (1954) - Isaac
- The Black Shield of Falworth (1954) - Archbishop at Myles' Knighting (uncredited)
- The Outlaw's Daughter (1954) - Jim Dalton
- Big House, U.S.A. (1955) - Madden's FBI Supervisor (uncredited)
- The Virgin Queen (1955) - Physician (uncredited)
- Creature with the Atom Brain (1955) - Dr. Kenneth C. Norton (uncredited)
- Rebel Without a Cause (1955) - Desk Sergeant #1 (uncredited)
- World Without End (1956) - Dr. Eldon Galbraithe
- The First Texan (1956) - Col. Hockley
- Hold Back the Night (1956) - Lt. Col. Toomey
- Strange Intruder (1956) - Doctor (uncredited)
- Toward the Unknown (1956) - Chaplain (uncredited)
- Friendly Persuasion (1956) - Methodist Minister (uncredited)
- Untamed Mistress (1956) - The Holy Man
- The Spirit of St. Louis (1957) - Director (uncredited)
- Gunfight at the O.K. Corral (1957) - Mayor Kelly
- God Is My Partner (1957) - Rev. William Goodwin
- Jet Pilot (1957) - FBI Agent (uncredited)
- The Unholy Wife (1957) - Metallurgy Expert (uncredited)
- Bombers B-52 (1957) - Brig. Gen. Wayne Acton
- Official Detective (1957, Episode: "Tinseled Alibi") - Cozco
- The Book of Acts Series (1957) - Apostle Paul / Saul of Tarsus
- The Naked and the Dead (1958) - Admiral (uncredited)
- Voice in the Mirror (1958) - Dr. Bernhardt (uncredited)
- Step Down to Terror (1958) - Reverend Johnson
- In Love and War (1958) - Lt. Col. Herron (uncredited)
- The Hangman (1959) - Col. Hammond (uncredited)
- Imitation of Life (1959) - Doctor (uncredited)
- These Thousand Hills (1959) - Brother Van (uncredited)
- Operation Petticoat (1959) - Adm. Koenig (uncredited)
- Vice Raid (1959) - Louise's Attending Physician (uncredited)
- Ma Barker's Killer Brood (1960) - George Barker
- The Gallant Hours (1960) - Adm. Dan Callaghan (uncredited)
- Ocean's 11 (1960) - Doctor / Specialist (uncredited)
- The Dark at the Top of the Stairs (1960) - Ed Peabody (uncredited)
- A Fever in the Blood (1961) - Doctor (uncredited)
- The Little Shepherd of Kingdom Come (1961) - Mr. Turner
- Lover Come Back (1961) - Northcross, Ad Council Chairman (uncredited)
- The Outsider (1961) - Judge (uncredited)
- Incident in an Alley (1962) - Police Commissioner Bell (uncredited)
- A Gathering of Eagles (1963) - Gen. Aymes
- The Silencers (1966) - Tung-Tze Agent (uncredited)
- The Nickel Ride (1974) - (uncredited) (final film role)
