= Hubert Cornfield =

American film director (1929-2006)

Hubert Cornfield (February 9, 1929 — June 18, 2006) was an American film director in Hollywood. He was born in Istanbul, Turkey, and died in Los Angeles. Billy Wilder, William Wyler and Joseph L. Mankiewicz all signed his Directors Guild of America (DGA) application.

He moved to the US as a refugee in 1941. He received attention for a short film he made The Color is Red which attracted the interest of 20th Century Fox.

He directed mainly crime films... from Film Noir to Neo Noir... and worked with legendary actors ranging from Marlon Brando to Sidney Poitier.

== Filmography ==
- The Color is Red (short)
- Sudden Danger (1955)
- Lure of the Swamp (1957)
- Plunder Road (1957)
- The 3rd Voice (1960)
- Angel Baby (1961) (replaced by Paul Wendkos)
- Pressure Point (1962)
- The Night of the Following Day (1969)
- Les Grands Moyens (1976)
