= William F. Claxton =

American film director

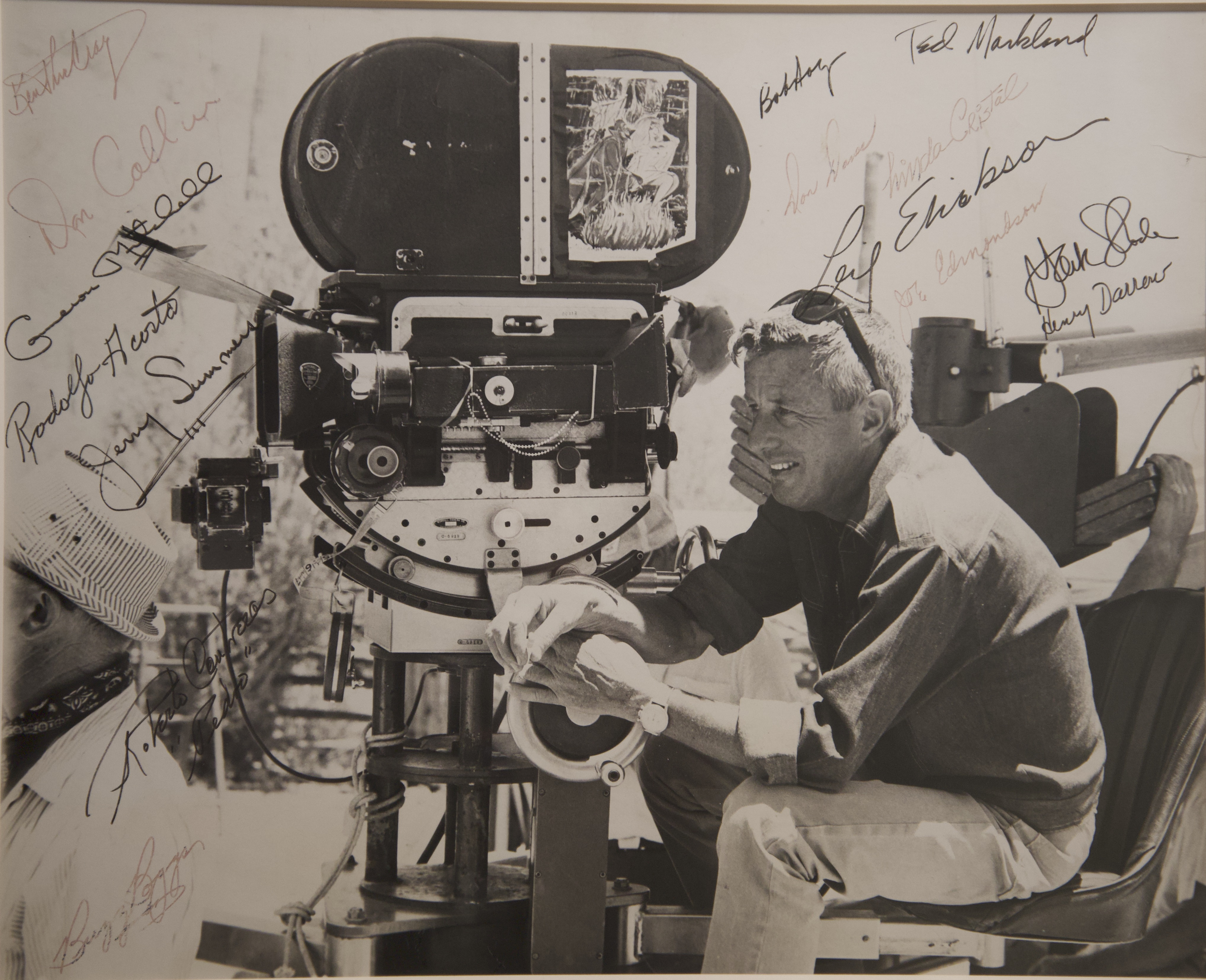
- Claxton directing The High Chaparral
- Born: William Francis Claxton; October 22, 1914; Los Angeles County, California, U.S.
- Died: February 11, 1996 (aged 81); Santa Monica, California, U.S.
- Occupations: Film/Television producer, editor, & director
- Years active: 1940–1988
- Spouse: Janet G. Claxton (m. 1937)
- Children: 2

William Francis Claxton (October 22, 1914 – February 11, 1996) was an American film and television producer, editor and director. He made a number of films for Robert L. Lippert. He also directed and produced episodes of Bonanza, the NBC-TV series Little House on the Prairie, and also directed episodes of the NBC-TV series Father Murphy, The Rifleman, The Twilight Zone, Fame, and The High Chaparral.

== Career ==
Claxton got his start in Hollywood as a film editor in the 1940s, where he was employed an editor for Edward Small Productions, as he would move into directing of second feature films by 1950s and 1960s, and also delve into television directing during this period.

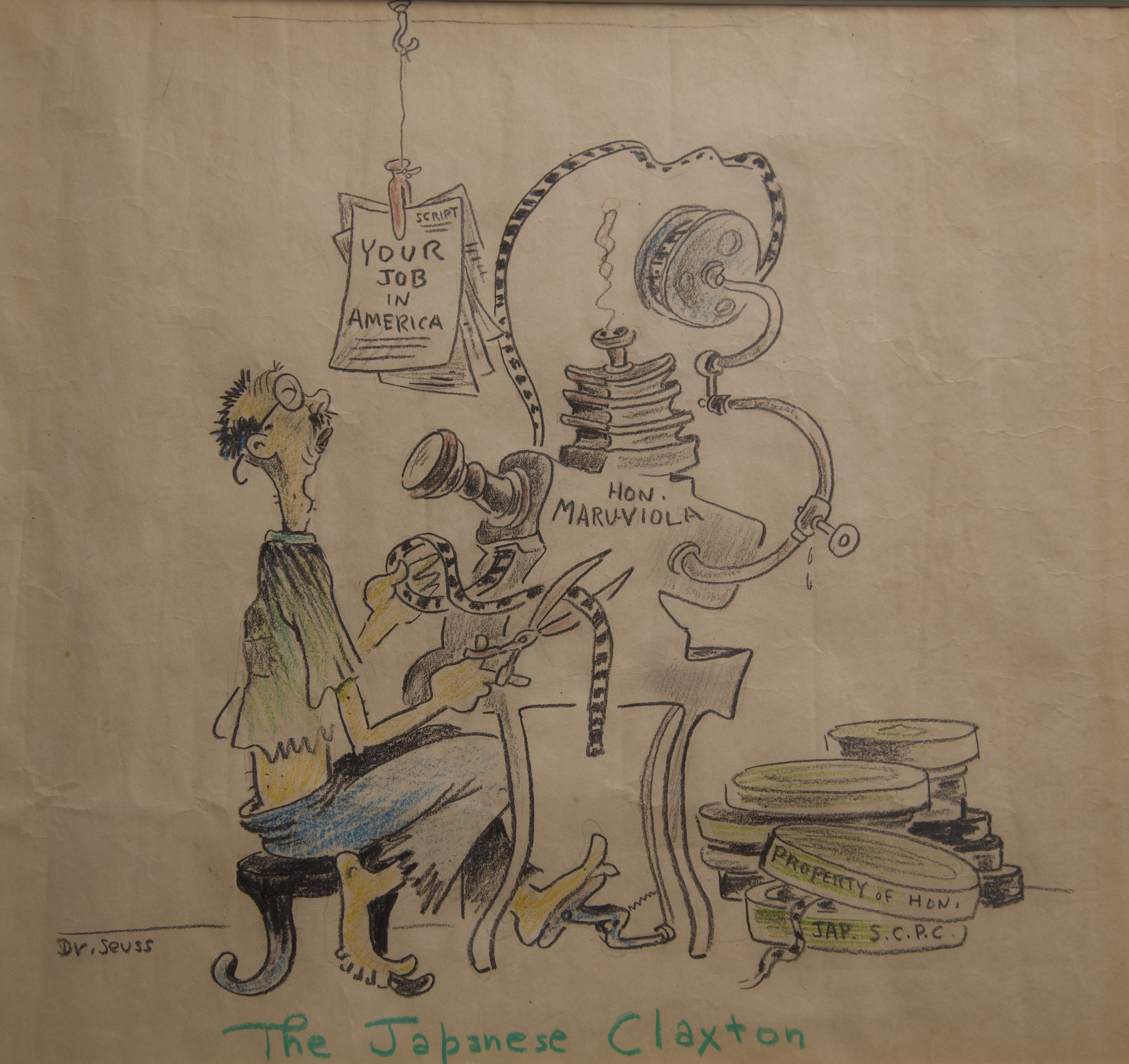
Drawing done during World War II

During World War II, Claxton served in the U.S. Army Signal Corps as a captain. Claxton worked under Frank Capra as a film editor on the Why We Fight series. Claxton worked alongside Theodor Seuss Geisel (Dr. Seuss) in the animation and film department of the U.S. Army.

Claxton's very first directorial effort was 1951's All That I Can Have. Claxton, who is best known for his TV work, enjoyed a long stint as producer/director of the syndicated Christian anthology series This is the Life (which was his first work in TV) from 1951 to 1980.

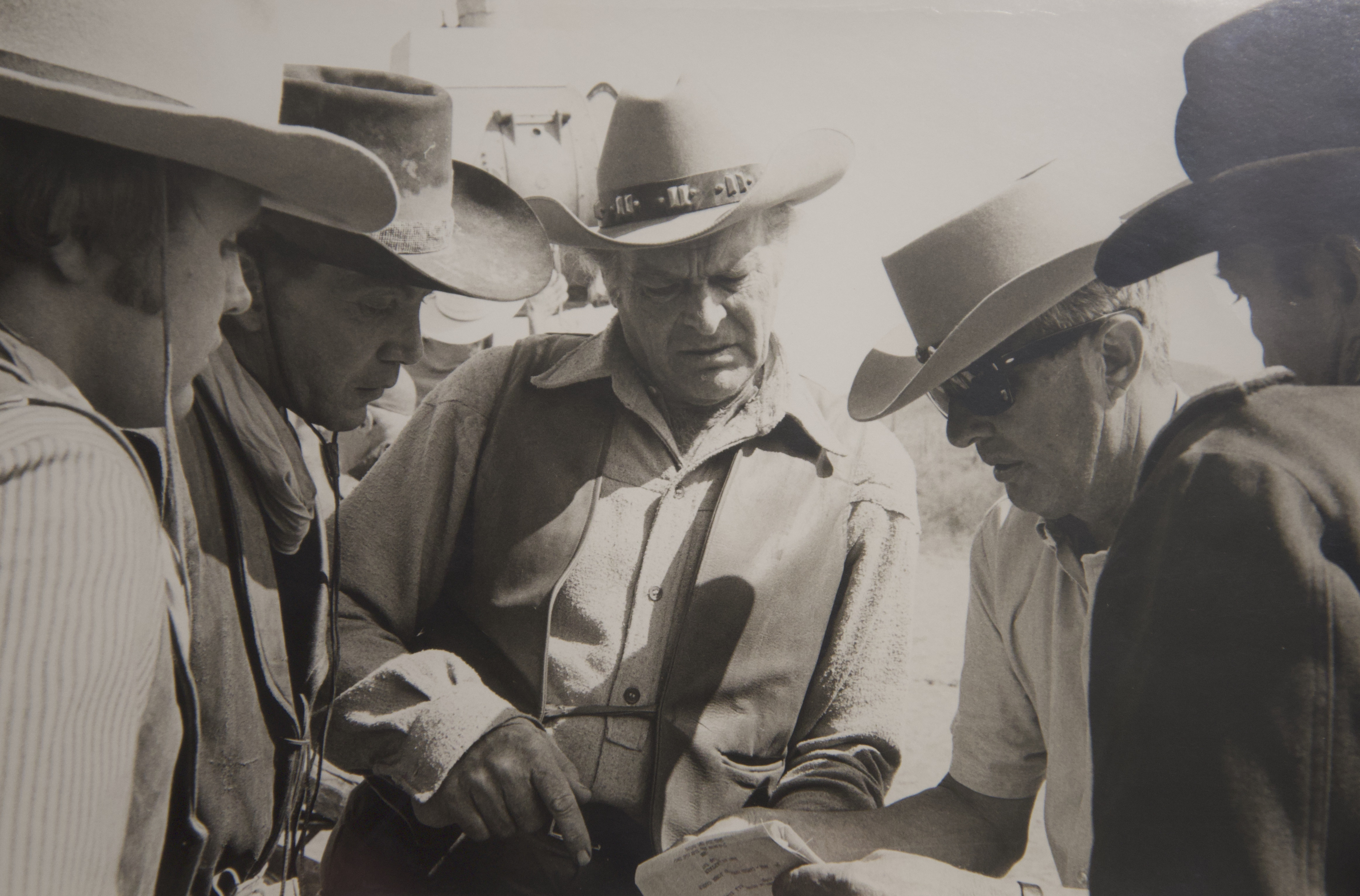

He spent much of the 1950s with 20th Century Fox's Regal Pictures subsidiary, turning out medium-budget films which included the films God Is My Partner (1956) and Desire in the Dust (1960); occasionally, as in the cast of Rockabilly Baby (1957), he produced as well as directed.

Claxton was a close friend to actor Michael Landon, with whom he worked on the NBC-TV series Bonanza, Little House on the Prairie and then Highway to Heaven, and who also enjoyed the This is the Life series, which Claxton was involved with. Claxton also directed the feature-length series pilot Bonanza: The Next Generation (1988).

== Selected filmography ==
- Tucson (1949)
- Stagecoach to Fury (1956)
- The Quiet Gun (1957)
- Young and Dangerous (1957)
- God Is My Partner (1957)
- Rockabilly Baby (1957)
- Desire in the Dust (1960)
- I'll Give My Life (The Unfinished Task) (1960)
- The Twilight Zone (4 episodes) (1960–1962)
- Tales of Wells Fargo ("Mr. Mute") (11/4/1961)
- Law of the Lawless (1964)
- Stage to Thunder Rock (1964)
- The High Chaparral (1967–1969)
- Night of the Lepus (1972)
- Bonanza (57 episodes) (1962–1973)
- Little House on the Prairie (68 episodes) (1974–1981)
- Father Murphy (8 episodes) (1981–1982)
- Fame (10 episodes) (1983–1984)
- Highway to Heaven (2 episodes) (1985)
- Bonanza: The Next Generation (1988)
- Michael Landon: Memories with Laughter and Love (1991)

== Personal life ==
William married Janet G. Christy in Los Angeles on October 29, 1937. They had two children.
