= Rogue Cop =

1954 film by Roy Rowland

- Theatrical Film Poster
- Directed by: Roy Rowland
- Screenplay by: Sydney Boehm
- Based on: the novel by William P. McGivern
- Produced by: Nicholas Nayfack
- Starring: Robert Taylor; Janet Leigh; George Raft
- Cinematography: John F. Seitz
- Edited by: James E. Newcom
- Music by: Jeff Alexander
- Production company: Metro-Goldwyn-Mayer
- Distributed by: Metro-Goldwyn-Mayer
- Release date: September 17, 1954 (United States)
- Running time: 92 minutes
- Country: United States
- Language: English
- Budget: $695,000
- Box office: $2,509,000

Rogue Cop is a 1954 American film noir directed by Roy Rowland. The film was based on the novel of the same name by William P. McGivern, and starred Robert Taylor, Janet Leigh, and George Raft.

== Plot ==
Christopher Kelvaney is a crooked police officer who takes bribes and payoffs from criminals and other nefarious folk. His brother Eddie is a young member of the police force who is honest and loyal.

In a penny arcade, a drug dealer is stabbed to death by a man who claims the territory for himself, and Eddie witnesses the murderer flee. Mob boss Dan Beaumonte gives orders to Kelvaney to buy his brother's silence. Eddie refuses, and Kelvaney is unable to persuade Eddie's sweetheart, nightclub singer Karen Stephenson, to change his mind.

The ruthless Beaumonte brutally mistreats his moll Nancy Corlane, who then tries to help Kelvaney do what he has to do. Kelvaney exposes the fact that Karen was once a mobster's girlfriend in Miami. He gets her to admit that she's not in love with Eddie and is willing to let him go if it will save his life.

An out-of-town hitman named Langley is brought in to kill both brothers, but succeeds only in killing Eddie. His conscience aroused, Kelvaney goes after the mob leaders himself. He admits his corruption to superiors, but asks for a chance to bring them evidence that will convict those responsible for his brother's murder. In order to bring down Beaumont's entire syndicate, Kelvaney his prepared to tell what he knows about all of their illegal activities, even though this will implicate himself. Kelvaney succeeds in apprehending Langley, although he is shot in the process. He asks for forgiveness for his crooked ways on the way to the hospital

== Cast ==
- Robert Taylor as Det. Sgt. Christopher Kelvaney
- Janet Leigh as Karen Stephenson
- George Raft as Dan Beaumonte
- Steve Forrest as Eddie Kelvaney
- Anne Francis as Nancy Corlane
- Robert Ellenstein as Det. Sidney Y. Myers
- Robert F. Simon as Ackerman
- Anthony Ross as Father Ahearn
- Alan Hale, Jr. as Johnny Stark
- Peter Brocco as George 'Wrinkles' Fallon
- Vince Edwards as Joey Langley
- Olive Carey as Selma
- Roy Barcroft as Lt. Vince D. Bardeman
- Dale Van Sickel as Manny
- Ray Teal as Patrolman Mullins
- Nesdon Booth as Detective Garrett
- Robert Burton as Inspector Adrian Cassidy

== Production ==
The film was based on a 1954 novel by William McGiven, who had written the novel on which The Big Heat was based. The New York Times called it "a classic study in guilt, retribution and atonement - without for an instant forgetting to tell an exciting story of swift action."

MGM bought the screen rights prior to publication in November 1953 and assigned Nicholas Nayfack to produce. Sidney Boehm, who had adapted The Big Heat, wrote the script.

In March 1954 MGM assigned Robert Taylor to star, with shooting to begin in May. Filming was pushed back on another Taylor film, Many Rivers to Cross.

In April 1954 Roy Rowland was assigned to direct Support roles were given to Janet Leigh, Steve Forrest and George Raft; the latter was making his first "A" picture in some years.

It was the last film Leigh made under her contract at MGM where she had been for eight years.

Anne Francis was cast as Raft's moll. Francis described it as "the one part I've been waiting for" and it led to her being signed to a long-term contract by MGM.

== Reception ==
=== Box office ===
According to MGM records the film earned $1,417,000 in the US and Canada and $1,092,000 elsewhere resulting in a profit of $920,000.

=== Critical response ===
Film critic Bosley Crowther gave the film a positive review and wrote, "This is not a new thesis. They've been making movies on it for years. And Rogue Cop is not so exceptional in its construction or performance that it is likely to cause surprise. But it is a well-done melodrama, produced and directed in a hard, crisp style, and it is very well acted by Robert Taylor in the somewhat disagreeable title role...For what it is in the line of crime pictures, there's a lot to be said for Rogue Cop."

The film was banned in several states because police believed that depiction of crooked cops in the film would give juvenile delinquents bad ideas, spurring film critic Pauline Kael to suggest that there was "almost no subject matter left for the mass-audience" and that everyone knew there was "widespread police corruption."

It led to a brief comeback in "A" pictures for George Raft.

=== Awards ===
Nominations

- Academy Awards: Oscar, Best Cinematography, Black-and-White, John F. Seitz; 1955.
