= Shield for Murder =

1954 film by Howard W. Koch, Edmond O'Brien

- Theatrical release poster
- Directed by: Edmond O'Brien; Howard W. Koch
- Screenplay by: Richard Alan Simmons; John C. Higgins
- Based on: the novel Shield for Murder by William P. McGivern
- Produced by: Aubrey Schenck
- Starring: Edmond O'Brien
- Cinematography: Gordon Avil
- Edited by: John F. Schreyer
- Music by: Paul Dunlap
- Color process: Black and white
- Production company: Aubrey Schenck Productions
- Distributed by: United Artists
- Release date: August 27, 1954 (New York)
- Running time: 82 minutes
- Country: United States
- Language: English

Shield for Murder is a 1954 American film noir crime film codirected by and starring Edmond O'Brien as a malevolent police detective. It is based on the novel of the same name written by William P. McGivern.

== Plot ==
Lieutenant Barney Nolan, a 16-year veteran of the police force, has become corrupt and vicious. In a secluded alley late one night he fatally shoots a bookmaker in the back and steals his $25,000. Barney then claims he was forced to kill the man because he tried to escape custody. Sergeant Mark Brewster, his friend and protégé, believes him, as does the Captain of Detectives, Captain Gunnarson. However, newspaper reporter Cabot suspects otherwise, as Barney has killed other suspects in the past and as there have been rumors about his illicit activities.

Barney takes his girlfriend, Patty Winters, to see a model home for sale, where he suggests the two of them could have a happy life. He slips away to hide the money outside. When he returns he asks Patty to marry him.

Packy Reed, the dead man's boss, sends private investigators Fat Michaels and Laddie O'Neil to tell Barney he wants to see him. After Barney leaves to meet Packy, the two men accost Patty threateningly, but Mark intervenes. Packy gives Barney one chance to return the money, but Barney is uncooperative.

Deaf-mute Ernst Sternmuller witnessed the bookmaker's murder. He goes to the police station with a note explaining what he saw, but gives it to Barney, whom he does not recognize as the killer. Barney later goes to the man's apartment to try to buy his silence. Sternmuller recognizes Barney's clothes and realizes he is the killer. Barney furiously pushes the old man, who falls, strikes his head, and dies. Barney stages things to make it seem like an accident, unaware that Sternmuller had been writing a full account of the murder. Mark, investigating the death, finds this narrative.

Meanwhile, Barney has drinks at a bar with a seductive blonde named Beth. He calls Patty on the phone and she reveals that Michaels and O'Neil had approached her menacingly. Enraged, he calls the two men to arrange a meeting, ostensibly to turn over the money he stole. When they arrive at the bar he pistol whips them both into unconsciousness in front of the bar's screaming owner and patrons.

Barney goes home, where he discovers Mark is waiting to arrest him. The two men struggle and Barney gets the upper hand. He knocks Mark out after momentarily considering shooting him in the back of the head. He goes to Patty and persuades her to pack up to start her new life with him. He tells her Packy is trying to frame him, but when he mistakenly mentions the money he has, Patty realizes what Mark has suggested to her about Barney is true. They argue and he slaps her; after he leaves, she disappears.

Mark, having regained consciousness, takes the notepad with Sturnmuller's account to his boss, Gunnarson, who initiates a manhunt. Barney overhears this on his police car radio. He retrieves his old patrolman's uniform and goes into hiding. Through a shady acquaintance, he arranges to flee to Buenos Aires. Patty goes to the police station and talks to Mark, who realizes the money must be hidden at the model home.

When Barney goes to pick up his tickets at a crowded swimming pool, he finds he has been set up – a bandaged Michaels is there. Barney himself had been attempting a swindle, as the "money" he hands over as payment for the getaway documents is newspaper clippings.

Barney and Michaels shoot it out, and the panicked swimmers dive for cover. Barney manages to kill him, then heads to the new house to retrieve the money he hid. The police converge on the house as Barney arrives. He shoots it out with them, hitting one cop, and manages to dig up the money, but as he emerges from the yard, he is confronted by several policemen. He fires at them and dies in a fusillade of bullets.

== Cast ==
- Edmond O'Brien as Barney Nolan
- Marla English as Patty Winters
- John Agar as Mark Brewster
- Emile Meyer as Capt. Gunnarson
- Carolyn Jones as Beth, the Girl at Bar
- Claude Akins as Fat Michaels
- Lawrence Ryle as Laddie O'Neil (as Larry Ryle)
- Herbert Butterfield as Cabot
- Hugh Sanders as Packy Reed
- William Schallert as Assistant D.A.
- Richard Deacon as The Professor (uncredited)

== Reception ==
=== Box office ===
According to producer Aubrey Schenck, the film "grossed a lot of money, you wouldn't believe how much; on television it's made a fortune."

=== Critical response ===
In a contemporary review for The New York Times, critic Oscar Godbout wrote: "What weaknesses there are in this film—and for that matter, values—seem to be the responsibility of Mr. O'Brien and Howard Koch, the directors. Too little attention was paid to the niceties of acting, with the exception of Mr. O'Brien's in the lead. ... And the merits are pleasant to relate. The story is intelligent and unstrained; qualities too rarely seen in films of this genre. There is little or no padding (a major achievement) and, although the direction sometimes smacks of haste, talent is definitely indicated. ... The pity of low-budget pictures is that often they reflect their limited means. 'Shield for Murder' does just that, and suffers as a result. Fine work is rarely achieved by hurried, impulsive methods."

Critic Leonard Maltin called Shield for Murder "a tidy, tough yarn," and gave it a rating of two-and-a-half stars (out of four).

In Film Noir: An Encyclopedic Reference to the American Style, film historian Carl Macek praises the effectiveness with which the film's subtext and conclusion, a midnight shootout in a labyrinth of tract homes under construction, "explodes the myth of suburbia. The corruption found in the police officer is carried over into his cozy environment of built-in dishwashers and two-car garages. O'Brien transcends his characterization of the policeman on the take and becomes a symbol of decaying middle-class values."

In his 1986 history, The United Artists Story, Ronald Bergan regarded Shield for Murder as one of the company's better low-budget 1954 releases, offering a "plum role" for director-star O'Brien. He also noted that it was rare in the movies of the 1950s to have a completely rotten cop as a protagonist.
