= John Cliff (actor) =

American film and television actor (1918–2001)

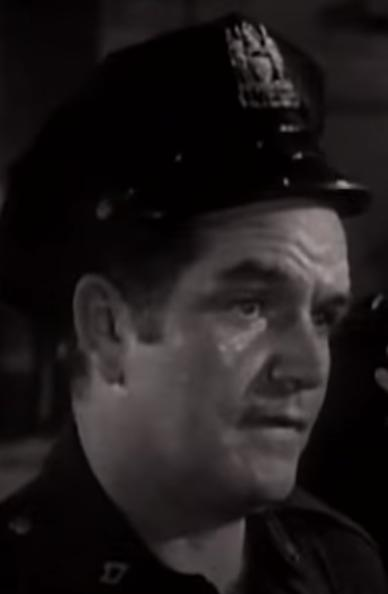
- Cliff in Man with a Camera, 1958
- Born: Jack Clifford; November 26, 1918; Swainsboro, Georgia, U.S.
- Died: May 12, 2001 (aged 82); Hayward, California, U.S.
- Occupations: Film and television actor

John Cliff (born Jack Clifford; November 26, 1918 – May 12, 2001) was an American film and television actor.

Cliff was born in Swainsboro, Georgia, where his father was running a minstrel show, He moved to California, where worked as a laborer in film studios. In California Cliff learned to fly and obtained a flight instructor's licence, but his plans to go into business as an instructor were interrupted by World War II. During the war he served in the United States Army Air Force, reaching the rank of captain. He wanted to work as a pilot in commercial aviation but was turned down because he did not have a college degree.

As an actor he used the name John Cliff, beginning his acting career in 1949 in the film Fighting Man of the Plains. His film appearances included Frenchie (1950), Best of the Badmen (1951), Siege at Red River (1954), The Second Greatest Sex (1955), The Fastest Gun Alive (1956), The Midnight Story (1957), Period of Adjustment and Never a Dull Moment (1968). His television appearances included Wagon Train, 77 Sunset Strip, Tales of Wells Fargo, Maverick, The Life and Legend of Wyatt Earp, Bat Masterson, The Man from U.N.C.L.E., The Virginian, The Deputy, Man with a Camera and Perry Mason. . In 1958 he played Dixon on season 1 episode 17 of "Wanted Dead or Alive" in "Drop to Drink".

Cliff retired from acting in the 1970s, last appearing in the action and adventure television series Kung Fu, and worked as a real estate agent until 1986. He died on May 12, 2001 of cancer in Hayward, California, at the age of 82.
