= One Foot in Hell (film) =

1960 Western directed by James B. Clark

- Theatrical release poster
- Directed by: James B. Clark
- Written by: Aaron Spelling; Sydney Boehm
- Produced by: Sydney Boehm
- Starring: Alan Ladd; Don Murray; Dan O'Herlihy
- Cinematography: William C. Mellor
- Edited by: Eda Warren
- Music by: Dominic Frontiere
- Color process: Color by DeLuxe
- Production company: 20th Century Fox
- Distributed by: 20th Century Fox
- Release date: July 1, 1960
- Running time: 90 minutes
- Country: United States
- Language: English
- Budget: $1,090,000

One Foot in Hell is a 1960 American Western and CinemaScope film starring Alan Ladd, Don Murray and Dan O'Herlihy, directed by James B. Clark and co-written by Sydney Boehm and Aaron Spelling from a story by Spelling.

== Plot ==
After the American Civil War and the tragic burning of Atlanta, southerner and Georgian, "Mitch Barrett" is a discharged former Confederate States Army soldier emigrating to the West with his loving wife "Ellie" in their wagon. She is pregnant and unfortunately goes into labor when they are forced to stop in a small cattle town of Blue Springs in the Arizona Territory (later state of Arizona after 1912), in the middle of the night.

After getting a hard time from the hotel desk clerk (who makes a negative comment about his gray trousers, obviously from a uniform), who finally gives a room for them. Then Mitch finds and gets the good-hearted town doctor, who does come but after examining her tells Mitch that he needs a certain prescription to help his wife ease her pains in childbirth.. He goes where the doc sends him to the local pharmacist who is upset at being woken up out of bed upstairs and deliberately takes his time filling out the medicine, then he balks at giving it to him unless he's paid the cost of $1.87, despite being told Mitch left his belongings in the room and about the sick woman back at the hotel, until in desperation Mitch pulls a gun. While heading back to the hotel, the Sheriff comes out hearing the yells of the robbed druggist and grabs Mitch who tries to explain his desperate situation. The Sheriff insists on taking him back to the jail, to check him against wanted posters, thereby wasting more time. Eventually, they all return to the hotel where the physician tells him it's too late and that his wife has died. Because of what Mitch sees as the heartlessness of these three local men failing to help in his desperate tragic situation, his anger deepens and rages inward – "George Caldwell" the hotel keeper, "Sam Giller" the general store owner and "Ole Olsen" the sheriff.

Unhinged by poor Ellie's death, he plots to get his revenge by killing them all and robbing the local bank of $100,000 / one hundred thousand dollars in gold being deposited by a rich cattleman driving his herd through to market, thus ruining the town.

When the other decent-minded town members are sorry to hear what happened to his wife and him, at the behest of the sympathetic doctor, they offer Mitch several job offers and requests for him to stay and live there. Among them are positions in the local store or town bank or in with the county sheriff. He accepts the job of deputy sheriff, then soon afterwards secretly murders the sheriff himself so that he can take his place.

To help him carry out the elaborately planned revenge plot centered around the Blue Springs bank robbery, he recruits over time in a nearby town, four other people to carry out his plot:

"Dan Keats", an alcoholic torn by his gruesome war memories, also another ex-Confederate Army lieutenant with artistic talents, who now scrapes a living drawing portraits of the customers in saloons to pay for his constant drinks. During the war, the Southern officer also learned the ancient technique of "Greek Fire" (liquid kerosene & chemicals mixed in a concoction in a glass bottle, used for an explosive). So Mitch is intrigued by the possibilities of this skill;

"Sir Harry Ivers" – 'of the Lancaster Ivers', an upper-class-sounding "blue-blood", fancy dressed English pickpocket, caught while practicing his craft in the saloon where deputy sheriff Barrett gets him out of the jam instead of arresting him;

"Julie Reynolds", a bar girl / prostitute who hopes to make enough money to go back East and make a respectable life for herself; she finds out a little about Mitch's ideas from tending to a drunken delirious Lt. Keats upstairs in the saloon / hotel room; and

"Stu Christian", a ruthless gunman, who already exhibited his trade.

After the robbery at the bank while escaping out the back door, gunfighter Christian, as planned, shoots Mitch in the shoulder with a superficial flesh wound to make it look right when he as sheriff pretended to try and apprehend them. Just before the robbery, on Mitch's instructions, Ivers and Christian separately kill the store owner and the hotel keeper for his revenge, mentioning the small amount of $1.87 so they'll know what their "crime" was for execution.

Afterwards, Mitch now sinks deeper into depravity, setting out to eliminate the other members of the gang to conceal his own part in the plot. He succeeds in killing Ivers and Christian but when he comes back to the hide-out cabin, corners Dan and Julie, who had earlier happen in love, in an embrace. After a struggle, Julie manages to shoot him in self-defense.

The only survivors now, Dan and Julie have a change of heart and not being guilty of the higher crime of murder, they return the stolen bank money, explaining everything to the understanding town doctor, and preparing to stand trial and spend some years in jail with the future possibility of later long-term happiness awaiting them after their release.

== Cast ==
- Alan Ladd as Mitch Barrett
- Don Murray as Dan Keats
- Dan O'Herlihy as Sir Harry Ivers
- Dolores Michaels as Julie Reynolds
- Barry Coe as Stu Christian
- Larry Gates as Doc Seltzer
- Karl Swenson as Sheriff Ole Olsen
- John Alexander as Sam Giller
- Rachel Stephens as Ellie Barrett

== Production ==
The film was known as Gunslinger or The Gunslingers.

The budget was over $1 million and Ladd got 10% of the profits.

Filming was interrupted when the Screen Actors Guild went on strike during the shoot on March 7, 1960, continuing until April. Filming resumed on April 11, 1960. Alan Ladd injured his hand while working at his ranch during the lay-off in the March–April 1960 Screen Actors Guild strike against Hollywood studios, but was well enough to resume filming.

Actress Dolores Michaels said to famous gossip columnist Hedda Hopper in the local major daily newspaper, the 'Los Angeles Times' in June 1960, that "Playing westerns aren't included among the things I'll settle for on screen, although the part of Julie in this picture is better than most. She's a bad girl who goes good and has a highly dramatic moment with a gun at the end. But a woman never wins in a Western and there's just so much you can do with this period piece."
