= Peter Whitney =

American actor (1916–1972)

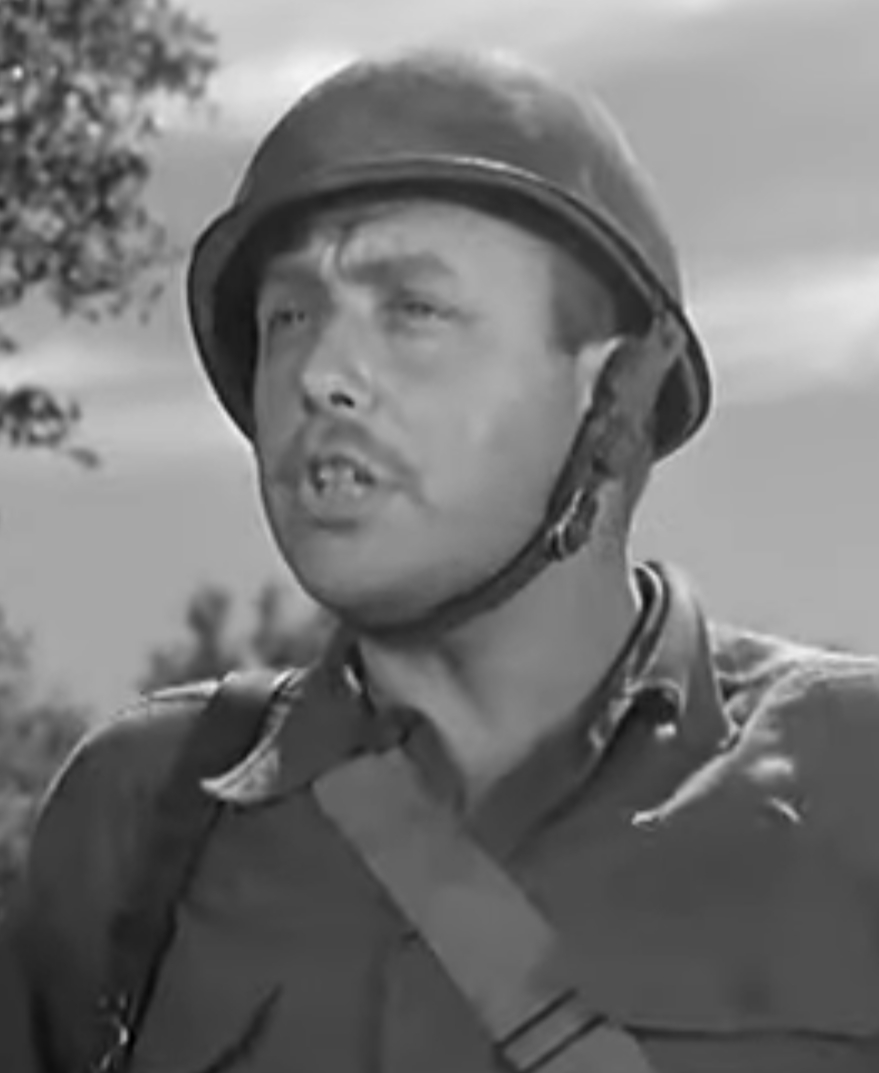
- Whitney in Baptism of Fire (1943)
- Born: Peter King Engle; May 24, 1916; Long Branch, New Jersey, U.S.
- Died: March 30, 1972 (aged 55); Santa Barbara, California, U.S.
- Resting place: Valley Oaks Memorial Park, Westlake Village, California
- Occupation: Actor
- Years active: 1941–1972
- Spouses: Adrienne Whitney (m. 1939; div. 1947) Barbara Engle (m. 1948)
- Children: 5

Peter King Engle (May 24, 1916 – March 30, 1972), known professionally as Peter Whitney, was an American actor in film and television. Tall and heavyset, he played brutish villains in many Hollywood films in the 1940s and 1950s.

== Early years ==
Whitney grew up in California. His schools included the Royal Central School of Speech and Drama in London. He studied drama at the Pasadena Playhouse.

== Career ==
Whitney appeared in the films Destination Tokyo (1943), Action in the North Atlantic (1943), Mr. Skeffington (1944), Murder, He Says (1945) (in which he played a dual role), The Big Heat (1953), In the Heat of the Night (1967), The Ballad of Cable Hogue (1970), and others before becoming well known for his work in television.

In the 1958–1959 season, Whitney had a co-starring role as Buck Sinclair, a former sergeant of the Union Army, in all 39 episodes of the ABC Western series The Rough Riders. He also guest-starred on the ABC/Warner Brothers Western series Colt .45. He performed the part of Ralph in the 1958 episode "Mantrap". He played United States Secret Service agent Gunnerson in the episode "Savage Hills," and Brock in "Dodge City or Bust" on the ABC/WB series, Maverick. In 1960, in the episode "Surface of Truth" of another ABC/WB Western series, Lawman, Whitney played Lucas Beyer, a crude white man who has lived for ten years with the Cheyenne Indians.

Whitney made three guest appearances on the CBS courtroom drama series Perry Mason: in 1961 he performed as the character Roger Gates in "The Case of the Pathetic Patient"; in 1962, as prison escapee Stefan "Big Steve" Jahnchek in "The Case of the Stand-in Sister"; and in 1965, as Captain Otto Varnum in "The Case of the Wrongful Writ."

Whitney also appeared on such series as Public Defender, Gunsmoke, Adventures of Superman, City Detective, Fury, My Friend Flicka ("A Case of Honor"), The Californians, The Sheriff of Cochise, Behind Closed Doors, Northwest Passage, Tate, Tombstone Territory (episode "Apache Vendetta"), Johnny Ringo, The Virginian (The Runaway – 1969), Riverboat, Bourbon Street Beat, The Alaskans, Overland Trail (as Governor Sutcliff in episode "First Stage to Denver"), The Rebel, The Islanders, Adventures in Paradise, Straightaway, Wagon Train, The Untouchables, Bonanza, Cheyenne, The Rifleman, The Monkees, Petticoat Junction (as Jasper Tweedy, in the 1969 episode: "Sorry Doctor, I Ain't Taking No Shots"), Green Acres, The Beverly Hillbillies, Rawhide (episode "Incident of the Music Maker"), Peter Gunn (as Josiah in the episode "The Best Laid Plans", and Hawaii Five-O. In addition, Whitney played a French partisan fighter named Massine in the 1963 episode "Thunder from the Hill" of ABC's military drama Combat!, as well as the character Caleb Calhoun in a 1964 episode of the Daniel Boone series. Then, in 1965, Whitney was cast as Judge Roy Bean in the episode "A Picture of a Lady" on the syndicated television series Death Valley Days.

He also did well as a comedy actor, making four appearances on "The Beverly Hillbillies" as the oafish Lafayette "Lafe" Crick.

Peter Whitney's final role on television was that of a grave robber in writer Rod Serling's series Night Gallery, in a 1972 episode segment titled "Deliveries in the Rear".

== Death ==
Whitney died of a heart attack at the age of 55 in Santa Barbara, California. He was buried at Pierce Brothers Valley Oaks Memorial Park in Westlake Village, California. He had 5 children.

== Partial filmography ==
- Underground (1941) – Alex
- Nine Lives Are Not Enough (1941) – Roy
- Blues in the Night (1941) – Pete Bossett
- Valley of the Sun (1942) – Willie
- Rio Rita (1942) – Jake
- Spy Ship (1942) – Zinner
- Busses Roar (1942) – Frederick Hoff
- Reunion in France (1942) – Soldier
- Whistling in Dixie (1942) – Frank V. Bailie
- Action in the North Atlantic (1943) – Whitey Lara
- Destination Tokyo (1943) – Dakota
- Mr. Skeffington (1944) – Chester Forbish
- Bring on the Girls (1945) – Swede
- Hotel Berlin (1945) – Heinrichs
- Murder, He Says (1945) – Mert Fleagle / Bert Fleagle
- Three Strangers (1946) – Timothy Delaney aka Gabby
- The Notorious Lone Wolf (1946) – Harvey Beaumont
- Blonde Alibi (1946) – Police Lieutenant Melody Haynes
- Canyon Passage (1946) – Cornelius – Baggage Clerk (uncredited)
- The Brute Man (1946) – Police Lieutenant Gates
- Violence (1947) – Joker Robinson
- Northwest Outpost (1947) – Volkoff Overseer
- The Gangster (1947) – Karty's Brother-in-Law (uncredited)
- The Iron Curtain (1948) – Cipher Lieutenant Vinikov (uncredited)
- Big Jim McLain (1952) – Communist Truck Driver (uncredited)
- The Great Sioux Uprising (1953) – Ahab Jones
- The Big Heat (1953) – Tierney
- All the Brothers Were Valiant (1953) – James Finch, First Mate
- Gorilla at Large (1954) – Kovacs
- The Black Dakotas (1954) – Grimes
- Day of Triumph (1954) – Nikator
- The Sea Chase (1955) – Bachman
- The Last Frontier (1955) – Sergeant Major Decker
- Cheyenne (1955–1962, TV Series) – Lionel Abbot / Eli Henderson / Hugo Parma / Sam Magruder
- Gunsmoke (1955–1965, TV Series) – Jason Holt / Dan Braden / Gip Cooley / Ira / Big Dan Daggit / Jase Murdock
- Great Day in the Morning (1956) – Phil the Cannibal (uncredited)
- The Cruel Tower (1956) – 'Joss' Jossman
- Man from Del Rio (1956) – Ed Bannister
- Tombstone Territory (1957) – Karl Rank
- Domino Kid (1957) – Lafe Prentiss
- The Walter Winchell File (1957, Episode: "Where is Louis Melk?") – Rocco Ricardi
- Zane Grey Theatre (1957–1961, TV Series) – Moose / Cox, Saloonkeeper / Growler / Chub
- Rough Riders (1958–59, TV Series) Sergeant Buck Sinclair
- Have Gun - Will Travel (1958–1960, TV Series) – Major Proctor / Judd Calhoun
- Official Detective (1958, Episode: "Missing") – Swanson
- Buchanan Rides Alone (1958) – Amos Agry
- Wagon Train (1958–1965, TV Series) – Buster Blee / Sheriff Pincus / Judd / Kempton / Sergeant Pat Galloway / El Landron / Rodney Miller
- The Rifleman (1959–1963, TV Series) – Nebeneezer Jackman / Vantine / Neb Jackman / John Holliver / Vince Fergus / Ott Droshek / Andrew Bechtel / John Jupiter / Tracey Blanch
- Rawhide (1960, TV Series) – Anton Zwahlen (A Swiss gunsmith sabotages the drovers' weapons in an ingenious attempt to rustle part of the herd. Kessle: Peter Whitney (not Werner Klemperer) Maria: Lili Kardell. Favor: Eric Fleming. Rowdy: Clint Eastwood.)
- Gunsmoke (1961) (Season 7 Episode 4: "Harpe's Blood") as Cooley
- Death Valley Days (1961–1966, TV Series) – Captain Joe Fuller / Judge Roy Bean / Peter the Hunter / Nat Halper / Joe Meekes
- Perry Mason (1961–1965, TV Series) – Roger Gates / Stefan "Big Steve" Jahnchek / Captain Otto Varnum
- Straightaway (1961) – Sam Cook (episode "The Heist")
- The Wonderful World of the Brothers Grimm (1962) – The Giant (uncredited)
- The Alfred Hitchcock Hour (1963) (Season 2 Episode 3: "Terror at Northfield") - Bib Hadley
- The Beverly Hillbillies (1964, TV Series) – Lafayette 'Lafe' Crick
- The Virginian (1964–1969, TV Series) – McPherson / Ansel Miller / Jake Landers / Lars Holstrom
- The Sword of Ali Baba (1965) – Abou
- In the Heat of the Night (1967) – Courtney
- The Monkees (1967, TV series) - El Diablo "A Nice Place to Visit"
- Chubasco (1968) – Matt
- The Great Bank Robbery (1969) – Brother Jordan Cass, Tunneling
- The Ballad of Cable Hogue (1970) – Cushing
- Night Gallery (1972, TV Series) – First Grave Robber (segment "Deliveries in the Rear")
- Tales of Wells Fargo (1961, TV Series S5E29) Moose
- Combat! (1963 Season 2, Thunder from the Hill, TV Series) Massine
