= Carolyn Jones =

American actress (1930–1983)

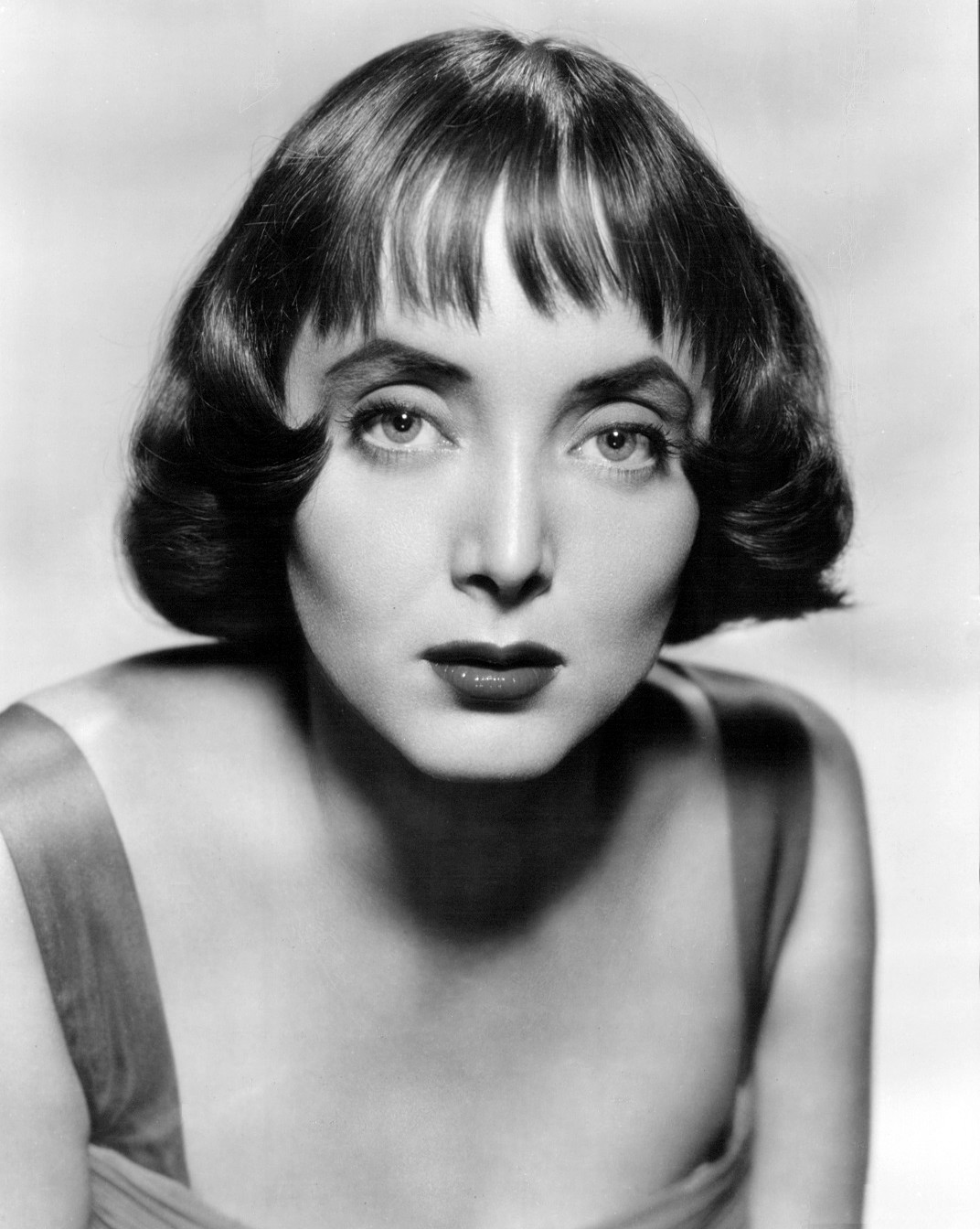
- Jones in 1956
- Born: Carolyn Sue Jones; April 28, 1930; Amarillo, Texas, U.S.
- Died: August 3, 1983 (aged 53); West Hollywood, California, U.S.
- Resting place: Melrose Abbey Memorial Park Cemetery, Anaheim, California, U.S.
- Occupations: Actress; singer
- Years active: 1952–1983
- Spouses: Don Donaldson (m. 1950; div. 1951) Aaron Spelling (m. 1953; div. 1964) Herbert Greene (m. 1968; div. 1977) Peter Bailey-Britton (m. 1982)

Carolyn Sue Jones (April 28, 1930 – August 3, 1983) was an American actress of television and film. She began her film career in the early 1950s and by the end of the decade, in 1958, had achieved recognition with a nomination for an Academy Award for Best Supporting Actress for The Bachelor Party (1957) and, that same year, won a Laurel Award for Top Supporting Female Performance, as well as a Golden Globe Award for New Star of the Year–Actress for her turn in Marjorie Morningstar. Her film career continued for another 20 years. In 1964, Jones began playing the role of Morticia Addams in the black-and-white television sitcom The Addams Family.

== Early life ==
Jones was born in Amarillo, Texas, to housewife Chloe Jeanette Southern (1906–1979) and barber Julius Alfred Jones (1897–1979). After Julius abandoned the family, in 1934, Carolyn and her younger sister, Bette Rhea Jones, moved with their mother into her maternal grandparents' Amarillo home. Carolyn suffered from severe asthma that often restricted her childhood activities, and when her condition prevented her from going to the movies, she became an avid reader of Hollywood fan magazines. She soon aspired to become an actress and, at age 18, enrolled to study at California's Pasadena Playhouse; her grandfather, Charles W. Baker, paid her tuition.

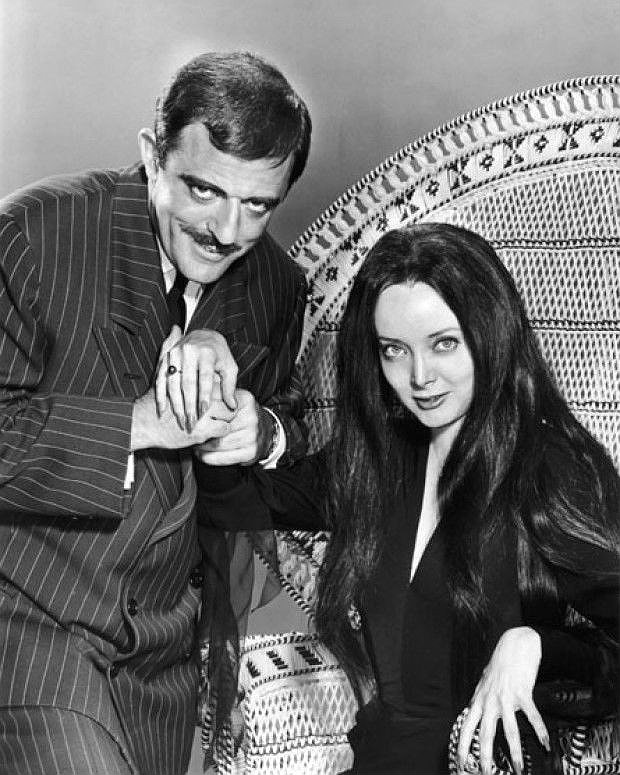
John Astin and Jones as Gomez and Morticia Addams in The Addams Family (1964)

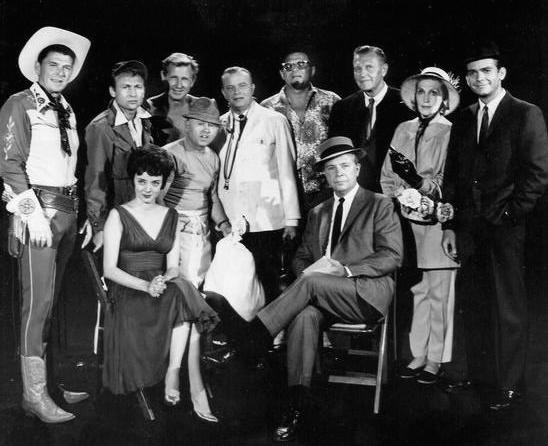
Guest stars for the 1961 premiere episode of The Dick Powell Show. Standing, from left: Ronald Reagan, Nick Adams, Lloyd Bridges, Mickey Rooney, Edgar Bergen, Jack Carson, Ralph Bellamy, Kay Thompson, Dean Jones. Seated: Jones, Dick Powell.

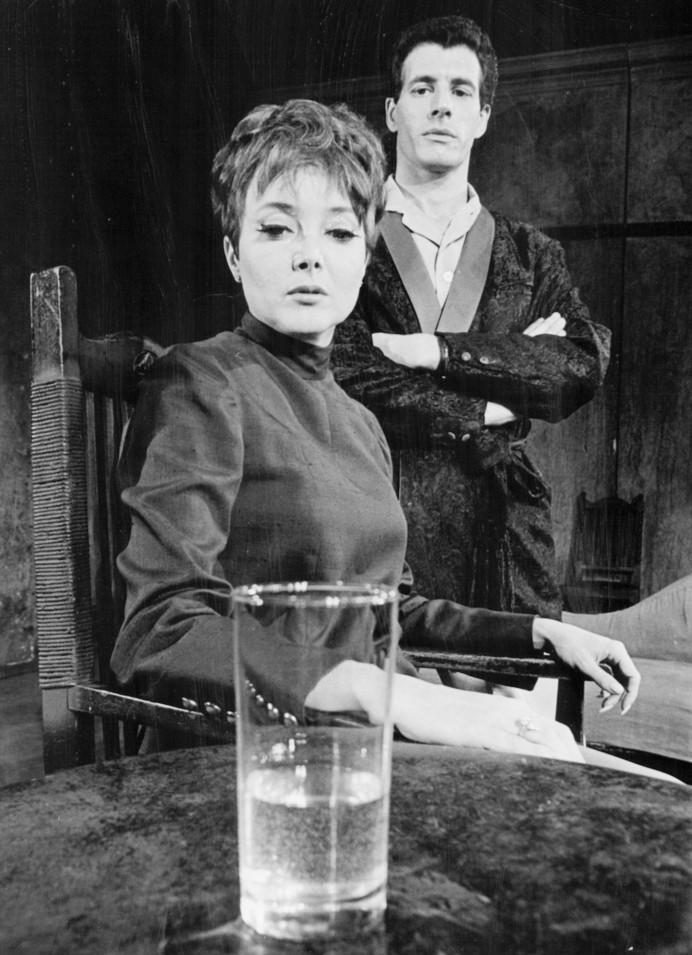
Jones and John Church in The Homecoming by Harold Pinter, 1967 Broadway production

== Film ==
After a talent scout spotted her at the Playhouse, Jones secured a contract with Paramount Pictures and made her first appearances on film: an uncredited role in The Turning Point (1952); an uncredited bit part as a nightclub hostess in The Big Heat (1953); and a role in House of Wax (also 1953) as the woman whom Vincent Price's character turns into a statue of Joan of Arc. She also played Beth in Shield for Murder (1954), earning $500 per day for her work.

Although Jones was cast in From Here to Eternity (1953) as Alma "Lorene" Burke, pneumonia forced her to withdraw, and the role went to Donna Reed, whose performance won her an Academy Award for Best Supporting Actress.

In 1956, Jones appeared in Invasion of the Body Snatchers and Alfred Hitchcock's The Man Who Knew Too Much, a remake of one of his earlier films.

In 1958, Jones was nominated for an Academy Award for Best Supporting Actress for The Bachelor Party (1957), directed by Delbert Mann, and shared the Golden Globe Award for New Star of the Year–Actress with Sandra Dee and Diane Varsi. That role required a brunette, but Jones was a natural blonde. So she dyed her hair brunette, to which she credited an upswing in her career. That year, she also appeared with Elvis Presley in King Creole (1958).

Jones played opposite Frank Sinatra in Frank Capra's A Hole in the Head, with Dean Martin in Career, and with Anthony Quinn and Kirk Douglas in Last Train from Gun Hill (all in 1959).

In How the West Was Won (1963), a Western, she played the wife of Sheriff Jeb Rawlings (George Peppard). She also appeared with Peppard and Debbie Reynolds in the final speaking/singing scenes of the film.

== Television ==
Jones made her television debut on the DuMont series Gruen Playhouse in 1952. She appeared in several episodes of Dragnet starring Jack Webb from 1953-1955, credited as ‘’Caroline Jones’’. She appeared in two Rod Cameron syndicated series, City Detective and State Trooper, as Betty Fowler in the 1956 episode, "The Paperhanger of Pioche”. Jones also appeared on the CBS anthology series Alfred Hitchcock Presents in the episode "The Cheney Vase" (1955), as a secretary assisting her scheming boyfriend Darren McGavin in attempting an art theft and opposite Ruta Lee.

In 1957 she had the lead in the episode "The Girl in the Grass" on CBS's Schlitz Playhouse, once again with Ray Milland and Nora Marlowe.

Jones guest-starred three times on the television series Wagon Train: in the first-season episode "The John Cameron Story" (1957) and in later color episodes "The Jenna Douglas Story" (1961) and "The Molly Kincaid Story" (1963). Also in 1963 she was nominated for a Golden Globe Award for Best TV Star - Female for portraying quadruplets—one the murder victim and the others suspects—in the Burke's Law episode "Who Killed Sweet Betsy?"

She guest-starred in CBS's The DuPont Show with June Allyson, with James Best and Jack Mullaney, in the episode "Love on Credit" (1960).

In the 1962–1963 season, Jones guest-starred on CBS's The Lloyd Bridges Show, created by her second husband, television producer Aaron Spelling. While married to Spelling, she appeared on the NBC program Here's Hollywood.

In 1964-1966, Jones played Morticia Addams in the television series The Addams Family, a role which brought her a Golden Globe Award nomination and success as a comedian. She guest-starred on the 1960s TV series Batman, playing "Marsha, Queen of Diamonds," and in 1976 appeared as the Amazon Queen and Wonder Woman's mother, Hippolyta, in the Wonder Woman TV series. In Tobe Hooper's movie Eaten Alive (1976), she played a madam running a rural whorehouse. The film also featured Neville Brand, Roberta Collins and Robert Englund. Her last role was Myrna, the scheming matriarch of the Clegg clan, on the soap opera Capitol from the first episode in March 1982 until March 1983, when she already knew that she was dying of cancer. During her occasional absences, actress Marla Adams substituted for her.

She played sporadic television roles in the 1970s including Mrs. Moore, the wife of the plantation owner in the miniseries Roots.

== Personal life ==
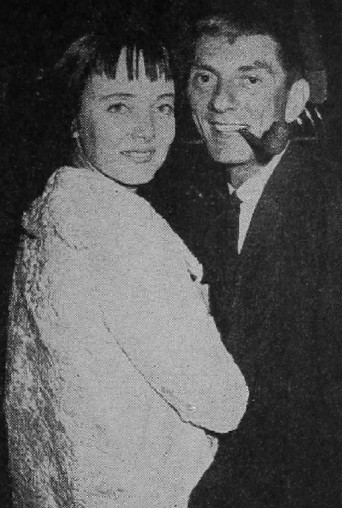
Jones and Aaron Spelling in 1960

Jones was married four times and had no children. While studying at the Pasadena Playhouse, she married Don Donaldson, a 28-year-old fellow student. The couple soon divorced.

She converted to Judaism upon marrying Aaron Spelling; the marriage lasted from 1953 until their 1964 separation and divorce.

Her third marriage, in 1968, was to Tony Award-winning Broadway musical director, vocal arranger and co-producer Herbert Greene (who was her vocal coach); she left him in 1977.

Jones' fourth and final marriage was to Peter Bailey-Britton in 1982, lasting until her death a year later.

=== Final years ===
Jones gained the role of the power-driven political matriarch Myrna Clegg in the CBS daytime soap opera Capitol in 1981. The following year, shortly after Capitol debuted, she was diagnosed with colon cancer and played many of her scenes in a wheelchair. The cancer spread quickly to her liver and stomach. Despite the pain, Jones finished the first season.

After being diagnosed with cancer Jones continued to work, telling colleagues that she was being treated for ulcers. After a period of apparent remission, the cancer returned in 1982.

== Death ==
In July 1983, a year after her cancer returned, Jones fell into a coma at her home in West Hollywood, California, where she died on August 3. Her body was cremated the next day and a memorial service was held at Glasband-Willen Mortuary in Altadena, California, on August 5; before her death, she asked John Astin to deliver her eulogy. Her ashes were interred in her mother's crypt at Melrose Abbey Memorial Park & Mortuary in Anaheim, California. She donated her Morticia costume and black wig to the Academy of Motion Picture Arts and Sciences and a collection of The Addams Family scripts was donated by Bailey-Britton to UCLA.

== Filmography ==
=== Film ===
Year	Title	Role	Notes
1952	The Turning Point	Miss Lillian Smith	Uncredited
1952	Road to Bali	Eunice	Uncredited
1953	Off Limits	Deborah	Also known as: Military Policeman (UK title). Uncredited
1953	The War of the Worlds	Blonde Party Guest	Uncredited
1953	House of Wax	Cathy Gray	
1953	The Big Heat	Doris	
1953	Geraldine	Kitty	
1954	Make Haste to Live	Mary Rose	
1954	The Saracen Blade	Elaine of Siniscola	
1954	Shield for Murder	Girl at Bar	
1954	Three Hours to Kill	Polly	Her character says: "I don't look so good in black"
1954	Désirée	Mme. Tallien	Uncredited
1955	The Seven Year Itch	Nurse Finch	
1955	The Tender Trap	Helen	
1956	Invasion of the Body Snatchers	Theodora 'Teddy' Belicec	
1956	The Man Who Knew Too Much	Cindy Fontaine	
1956	The Opposite Sex	Pat	
1957	The Bachelor Party	The Existentialist	Nominated—Academy Award for Best Supporting Actress
1957	Johnny Trouble	Julie Horton	
1957	Baby Face Nelson	Sue Nelson	
1958	Marjorie Morningstar	Marsha Zelenko	Golden Globe Award for New Star of the Year – Actress (with Sandra Dee and Diane Varsi)
1958	King Creole	Ronnie	
1959	The Man in the Net	Linda Hamilton	
1959	Last Train from Gun Hill	Linda	
1959	A Hole in the Head	Shirl	
1959	Career	Shirley Drake	
1960	Ice Palace	Bridie Ballantyne	
1961	Sail a Crooked Ship	Virginia	
1962	How the West Was Won	Julie Rawlings	
1963	A Ticklish Affair	Tandy Martin	
1969	Heaven with a Gun	Madge McCloud	
1969	Color Me Dead	Paula Gibson	
1976	Eaten Alive	Miss Hattie	Also known as: Death Trap, Horror Hotel and Starlight Slaughter
1979	Good Luck, Miss Wyckoff	Beth	

=== Television ===
Year	Title	Role	Notes
1952	Chevron Theatre	?; ?	2 episodes: "An Affair at the Embassy" and "Call the Police"
1952–1954	Mr. and Mrs. North	Grace Wilson; Mrs. Janet Ferber; Ellen	3 episodes: "A Good Buy", "Dead Man's Tale" and "Model for Murder"
1953–1955	Dragnet	?; Donna Stewart; Marian Fuller; Laura Osborne; ?	5 episodes; billed as Caroline Jones on first 4 episodes
1954	The Colgate Comedy Hour	Hazel	Season 4, Episode 21
1954	Lux Video Theatre	?	Episode: "The Outside Witness"
1954	The Pepsi-Cola Playhouse	Alice; ?; Karen Brook	3 episodes: "Account Closed", "The Silence" and "Doubled in Danger"
1954	Four Star Playhouse	Dolores	Episode: "The Answer"
1954–1955	City Detective	Linda; Alene	2 episodes: "On the Record" and "A Girl's Best Friend"
1954–1955	Treasury Men in Action	?; Judy King; Eadie Starr	Also known as: Federal Men. 3 episodes
1954–1955	Studio 57	Corinna Rogers; Carol Marshall; Diana Flagg; Maria	4 episodes
1954–1955	My Favorite Husband	Janie Cooper	Season 1, Episode 40; Season 3, Episode 9: "The Painting"
1954–1957	Schlitz Playhouse of Stars	June Sardo; Sarah; Girl; Wealthy Wife	4 episodes
1955	Meet Mr. McNutley	Risa Powell	Episode: "Mr. Sargent and the Lady"
1955	The Man Behind the Badge	Louise	Episode: "The Case of the Desperate Moment"
1955	Alfred Hitchcock Presents	Pamela Waring	Episode: "The Cheney Vase"
1955–1956	The 20th Century Fox Hour	Marcia Bridges; Rita Kirby	2 episodes: "Cavalcade" and "The Heffron Family"
1955–1957	Jane Wyman Presents the Fireside Theatre	Patient; Madeline Kovak	2 episodes: "The Key" and "The Little Black Lie"
1955–1957	The Millionaire	Emily Short; Carol Fletcher	2 episodes: "The Emily Short Story" and "The Matt Kirby Story"
1956	Star Stage	?	Episode: "Screen Credit"
1956	Passport to Danger	Sally Towne; Celia	2 episodes: "Batavia" and "Athens"
1956	State Trooper	Betty Fowler	Episode: "The Paperhanger of Pioche"
1957	Wire Service	Eve	Episode: "Dateline Las Vegas"
1957	Panic!	Janet Hunter	Episode: "The Airline Hostess"
1957	General Electric Theater	Phyllis	Episode: "The Man Who Inherited Everything"
1957	Climax!	Helen	Episode: "The Disappearance of Amanda Hale"
1957–1961	Dick Powell's Zane Grey Theatre	Ella Clanton; Sal - Rue Royale Proprietor; Julie Whiting	3 episodes: "Until the Man Dies", "Picture of Sal" and "Blood Red"
1957–1963	Wagon Train	Julie Cameron; Jenna Douglas; Molly Kincaid	3 episodes: "The John Cameron Story", "The Jenna Douglas Story" and "The Molly Kincaid Story"
1958	Playhouse 90	Julie Reynolds	Episode: "The Last Man"
1959	The David Niven Show	Girl	Episode: "Portrait"
1960	The DuPont Show with June Allyson	Lena Murchak	Also known as: The June Allyson Show. Episode: "Love on Credit"
1961–1962	The Dick Powell Show	Julie Greer; Hannah Cole; Cleo Plowright	3 episodes: "Who Killed Julie Greer?", "Goodbye, Hannah" and "The Sea Witch"
1962	Frontier Circus	Amy Tyson	Episode: "Stopover in Paradise"
1962	The Lloyd Bridges Show	Cathy	Episode: "Just Married"
1962	Dr. Kildare	Evy Schaller	Episode: "The Mask Makers"
1963–1964	Burke's Law	The Richards quadruplets; Carole Durand	2 episodes: "Who Killed Sweet Betsy?" and "Who Killed Madison Cooper?"; Nominated—Golden Globe Award for Best TV Star - Female (1963)
1964	The DuPont Show of the Week	Jo Jo	Episode: "Jeremy Rabbitt - The Secret Avenger"
1964–1966	The Addams Family	Morticia Addams; Ophelia Frump; Lady Fingers	Main role, 64 episodes
1966–1967	Batman	Marsha, Queen of Diamonds	5 episodes
1967	Rango	Belle Starker	Episode: "What's a Nice Girl Like You Doing Holding Up a Place Like This?"
1967	The Danny Thomas Hour	Stacey McCall	Episode: "Fame Is a Four-Letter Word"
1969	Bracken's World	Paula Shannon	Episode: "King David"
1969	The Mod Squad	Ginny / Lisa Whittaker	Episode: "Lisa"
1969	Storybook Squares	Morticia Addams	Series debut
1969–1970	Love, American Style	Vera	Segment: "Love and the Geisha". 2 episodes
1970	The Name of the Game	Lydia Mulholland	Episode: "Why I Blew Up Dakota"
1971	The Men from Shiloh	Annie Spencer	Episode: "The Legacy of Spencer Flats"
1971	Dan August	Margo	Episode: "The Assassin"
1972	The New Scooby-Doo Movies	Morticia Addams (voice)	Episode: "Wednesday Is Missing"
1972	Ghost Story	Martha Alcott	Episode: "The Summer House"
1973	The New Perry Mason	Marian Ryan	Episode: "The Case of the Frenzied Feminist"
1974	Ironside	Justine Cross	2 episodes: "Raise the Devil: Parts 1 & 2"
1975	Kolchak: The Night Stalker	The Registrar	Episode: "Demon in Lace"
1976	Ellery Queen	Rita Radcliffe	Episode: "The Adventure of the Hardhearted Huckster"
1976–1977	Wonder Woman	Queen Hippolyta	3 episodes: "The Feminum Mystique: Parts 1 & 2" and "Wonder Woman in Hollywood"
1977	Roots	Mrs. Moore	Television miniseries
1977	Halloween with the New Addams Family	Morticia Addams; Ophelia Frump	Television film
1977	Captain Caveman and the Teen Angels	Additional voices	Episode: "The Mystery Mansion Mix-Up"
1977	Little Ladies of the Night	Marilyn Atkins	Television film
1977–1981	Quincy, M.E.	Nurse Barbara Grayson; Sybil Presstin; Victoria Sawyer	3 episodes: "Valleyview", "Last of the Dinosaurs" and "Stain of Guilt"
1979	The French Atlantic Affair	Peg	Television miniseries
1979	The Love Boat	Margaret Jerome	Episode: "Play by Play / Cindy / What's a Brother For?" (Segment: "Cindy")
1979–1982	Fantasy Island	Ellie Simpson; Jessie DeWinter; Clora McAllister; Ellie Ackland	4 episodes
1980	The Dream Merchants	Vera	Television miniseries
1980	Whew!	Herself	5 episodes
1981	Midnight Lace	Bernadette Chance	Television film. Remake of 1960 feature film
1982	Tattletales	Herself	5 episodes
1982–1983	Capitol	Myrna Clegg	Main role (until becoming ill in April 1983); her final acting role

== Honors ==
Year	Award	Category	Title of work	Result
1958	Academy Award	Best Supporting Actress	The Bachelor Party	Nominated
1959	Golden Globe Award	New Star of the Year – Actress	Marjorie Morningstar	Won
1963	Golden Globe Award	Best TV Star - Female	Burke's Law	Nominated

== Bibliography ==
- Pylant, James (2012). In Morticia's Shadow: The Life & Career of Carolyn Jones. Jacobus Books. ISBN 978-0984185757.
