= Sydney Boehm =

American screenwriter (1908–1990)

- Born: April 4, 1908; Philadelphia, Pennsylvania, U.S.
- Died: June 25, 1990 (aged 82); Woodland Hills, California, U.S.
- Occupation: Screenwriter

Sydney Boehm (April 4, 1908 – June 25, 1990) was an American screenwriter and producer. Boehm began his writing career as a newswriter for wire services and newspapers before moving on to screenwriting. His films include High Wall (1947), Anthony Mann-directed Side Street (1950), the sci-fi film When Worlds Collide (1951), and the crime drama The Big Heat (1953), for which Boehm won a 1954 Edgar Award for Best Motion Picture Screenplay.

Boehm was born in Philadelphia, Pennsylvania on April 4, 1908, and died in Woodland Hills, California on June 25, 1990, at age 82.

== Partial filmography ==
- A Guy Named Joe (1944)
- Knickerbocker Holiday (1944)
- High Wall (1947)
- Side Street (1950)
- Mystery Street (1950)
- Branded (1950)
- Union Station (1950)
- When Worlds Collide (1951)
- The Atomic City (1952)
- The Savage (1952)
- The Big Heat (1953)
- Second Chance (1953)
- Secret of the Incas (1954)
- Siege at Red River (1954)
- The Raid (1954)
- Black Tuesday (1954)
- Rogue Cop (1954)
- Six Bridges to Cross (1955)
- Violent Saturday (1955)
- The Tall Men (1955)
- The Bottom of the Bottle (1955)
- The Revolt of Mamie Stover (1956)
- Hell on Frisco Bay (1956)
- Harry Black and the Tiger (1958)
- A Nice Little Bank That Should Be Robbed (1958)
- Woman Obsessed (1959)
- Seven Thieves (1960)
- One Foot in Hell (1960)
- Shock Treatment (1964)
- Sylvia (1965)
- Rough Night in Jericho (1967)
