= High Wall =

1947 film by Curtis Bernhardt

- Theatrical release poster
- Directed by: Curtis Bernhardt
- Screenplay by: Sydney Boehm; Lester Cole
- Based on: High Wall a 1936 novel by Alan R. Clark; Bradbury Foote (play)
- Produced by: Robert Lord
- Starring: Robert Taylor; Audrey Totter; Herbert Marshall
- Cinematography: Paul C. Vogel
- Edited by: Conrad A. Nervig
- Music by: Bronislau Kaper
- Production company: Metro-Goldwyn-Mayer
- Distributed by: Loew's Inc.
- Release date: December 17, 1947 (United States)
- Running time: 99 minutes
- Country: United States
- Language: English
- Budget: $1,844,000
- Box office: $2,618,000

High Wall is a 1947 American film noir starring Robert Taylor, Audrey Totter, and Herbert Marshall. It was directed by Curtis Bernhardt from a screenplay by Sydney Boehm and Lester Cole, based on a novel by Alan R. Clark and a play by Bradbury Foote.

== Plot ==
Steven Kenet, a former WWII bomber pilot and recent mercenary flyer, crashes his car into a river, hoping to kill himself and cover up the strangulation murder of his wife Helen, whose body is in the passenger seat. He survives, but, due to a wartime brain injury that was aggravated by a crash in Burma, he says he has no memory of what happened, and is sent to the county psychiatric hospital to determine if he is sane enough to be charged with murder.

Dr. Ann Lorrison takes an interest in Steven's case, and in him. An operation could resolve the cause of his headaches and blackouts, but he refuses to consent to it, as he thinks he is guilty, and would rather stay in the hospital than go to jail. In spite of pressure from the district attorney's office on hospital administrators to force surgery on him, they refuse. However, when Ann informs Steven that his mother has died, he changes his mind, now wanting to be declared sane so he can make decisions about what to do with his six-year-old son Richard, whom he hopes to keep out of the county orphanage. Without telling Steven, Ann brings Richard to stay with her and her aunt.

Meanwhile, Henry Cronner, the janitor at the apartment building where Helen's boss, Willard Whitcombe, lives, attempts to blackmail Whitcombe over his potential role in her death. After being rebuffed, Cronner goes to see Steven, hinting he knows there was a third person in the apartment when Helen died, but withholding details until Steven has control of his finances again. When Cronner mentions visiting Steven, Whitcombe sends Cronner plummeting to his death down the elevator shaft in their building.

Now questioning his guilt, Steven agrees to undergo "narcosynthesis"—a light dose of sodium pentothal—to help him remember what happened, but only recalls finding Helen in Whitcombe's apartment and blacking out just as his hands were around her neck, then finding her dead body when he regained consciousness. After the session, he hides in Ann's car to escape from the hospital, and takes her to Whitcombe's empty apartment, where he recreates a scene resembling that of Helen's death. Remembering that a suitcase was missing when he awoke from his blackout, he leaves without cleaning up and returns with Ann to the hospital to wait for Whitcombe to contact him.

Whitcombe visits Steven the next day and provokes an attack by confessing to killing Helen and Cronner, saying no one will believe Steven if he tells them. Steven is put in solitary confinement, but breaks free when Ann hears what happened and goes to him. He steals her car, and, eluding a sweeping manhunt, makes it to Whitcombe's apartment building. It is guarded by police, but Ann shows up, and together they manage to sneak in.

In a brutal fistfight, Steven dazes Whitcombe, and Ann seizes the opportunity to administer sodium pentothal to him. Before several police officers, Whitcombe recounts how he tried to end his affair with Helen after finding Steven unconscious in his apartment, but she threatened to cause a scandal and ruin any chance of him becoming a partner in his publishing firm, so he strangled her. Though the statement is inadmissible in court, the lead detective lets Steven go free and arrests Whitcombe, confident he can get a valid confession once the truth serum has worn off.

Ann brings Steven to her home to see Richard. After gently touching the sleeping boy's hand, Steven kisses Ann.

== Cast ==
- Robert Taylor as Steven Kenet, a pilot with a head injury
- Audrey Totter as Dr. Ann Lorrison, a psychiatrist at Hamelin County Psychiatric Hospital
- Herbert Marshall as Willard I. Whitcombe, editor at Brattle Press
- Dorothy Patrick as Helen Kenet, Steven's wife and Whitcombe's secretary
- H. B. Warner as Mr. Slocum, a long-time patient at the hospital
- Warner Anderson as Dr. George Poward
- Moroni Olsen as Dr. Philip Dunlap, the head doctor at the hospital
- John Ridgely as Assistant District Attorney David Wallace
- Morris Ankrum as Dr. Stanley Griffin, a neurosurgeon
- Elisabeth Risdon as Mrs. Kenet, Steven's mother
- Vince Barnett as Henry Cronner, the arthritic janitor at Whitcomb's apartment building
- Jonathan Hale as Emory Garrison, a Brattle Press board member
- Charles Arnt as Sidney X. Hackle, Steven's court-appointed lawyer
- Ray Mayer as Tom Delaney, a friendly orderly
- Bobby Hyatt as Richard Kenet, Steven and Helen's son
- Eula Guy as Vera Mercer, an employee at Brattle Press (uncredited)
- Mary Servoss as Martha Ferguson, Ann's aunt (uncredited)
- Dick Wessel as Jim Hale, a tough orderly (uncredited)
- Irving Bacon as the owner of the gas station (uncredited)
- Frank Jenks as Pinky, a drunk man Steven and Ann meet in a bar (uncredited)
- Jack Davis as Detective Halloran (uncredited)

== Reception ==
The film had a budget of $1,844,000, and earned $1,553,000 in the US and Canada and $1,065,000 elsewhere, resulting either in a profit of $744,000, or a loss of $101,000, depending on the period source consulted.

=== Critical response ===
A contemporary review of the film in The New York Times said: "As straight movie melodrama, employing modern psychotherapy, High Wall is a likely lot of terrors, morbid and socially cynical. Just the thing for your holiday entertainment—unless, of course, you are sane."

In 1984, writer Spencer Selby called High Wall "stylish, representative of late forties noir thrillers."

Writing in 2006, film critic Dennis Schwartz called the film "a tepid and chatty psychological melodrama that is embellished with black-and-white film noir visuals by the adept camerawork of Nicolas Vogel," but thought the main cast "adequate but too bland to convince us that their romance was possible. Robert Taylor's personal despair was more like angst in a soap opera than film noir. The film's biggest faults were that it was never convincing as a mystery story, that the romance story was more Hollywood fantasy than real, that the truth serum is so casually accepted as the answer to establishing the truth and that brain surgery can so easily cure Taylor of his mental disorder."
