= Siege at Red River =

1954film

- Theatrical release poster
- Directed by: Rudolph Maté
- Screenplay by: Sydney Boehm
- Story by: J. Robert Bren; Gladys Atwater
- Produced by: Leonard Goldstein
- Starring: Van Johnson; Joanne Dru; Richard Boone; Milburn Stone; Jeff Morrow; Craig Hill
- Cinematography: Edward Cronjager
- Edited by: Betty Steinberg
- Music by: Lionel Newman
- Production company: Panoramic Productions
- Distributed by: 20th Century Fox
- Release date: May 1, 1954
- Running time: 86 minutes
- Country: United States
- Language: English

Siege at Red River is a 1954 American Western film directed by Rudolph Maté and written by Sydney Boehm. The film stars Van Johnson, Joanne Dru, Richard Boone, Milburn Stone, Jeff Morrow, and Craig Hill. The film was released on May 1, 1954, by 20th Century Fox.

== Plot ==
In Ohio in 1865, a Confederate Army officer in civilian clothes calling himself Jim Farraday and a sergeant going by Benjy transport a Gatling gun to aid the Southern cause in the war. They come to the aid of a Rebel-hating Yankee nurse, Nora Curtis, whose wagon is stuck in the mud.

Stopping off in a town for supplies and information, Farraday falls under the suspicion of a Pinkerton detective, Frank Kelso, who has been assigned to locate the stolen Gatling gun. Behind her back, Farraday and Benjy smuggle the gun out of town in Nora's wagon.

A mercenary, Brett Manning, befriends the soldiers on the trail, then betrays them, shooting Benjy and stealing the gun. He sells it to tribal leader Chief Yellow Hawk, who uses it during an attack on a fort against soldiers, women and children. Farraday joins forces with Kelso to overcome Yellow Hawk's men and take the gun back, turning the battle in the fort's favor. Nora successfully argues that Kelso should reward Farraday by letting him go home to Georgia. Knowing that the war is nearly over, he allows Farraday to leave.

== Cast ==
- Van Johnson as Capt. James S. Simmons / Jim Farraday
- Joanne Dru as Nora Curtis
- Richard Boone as Brett Manning
- Craig Hill as Lt. Braden
- Milburn Stone as Sgt. Benjamin 'Benjy' Guderman
- John Cliff as Sgt. Jenkins
- Jeff Morrow as Frank Kelso
- Rico Alaniz as Chief Yellow Hawk
- Robert Burton as Sheriff
- Pilar Del Rey as Lukoa
- Ferris Taylor as Anderson Smith

== Production ==
Parts of the film were shot in Professor Valley, Colorado River, Castle Valley and Dead Horse Point in Utah, as well as in Durango, Colorado.
