= William P. McGivern =

American novelist

McGivern in the 1950s

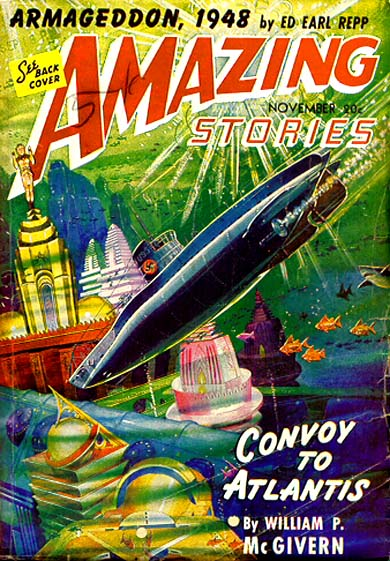
McGivern's novella "Convoy to Atlantis" was the cover story in the November 1941 issue of Amazing Stories

William Peter McGivern (December 6, 1918 – November 18, 1982) was an American novelist and television scriptwriter. He published more than 20 novels, mostly mysteries and crime thrillers, some under the pseudonym Bill Peters.

His novels were adapted for a number of films, including Odds Against Tomorrow (1959), a racially charged noir starring Harry Belafonte; The Big Heat (1953), starring Glenn Ford as a cop who will do anything to get his man; Shield for Murder, about an honest cop going bad; and Rogue Cop (1954), a film noir directed by Roy Rowland, about a crooked cop trying to redeem himself. The Big Heat received an Edgar Award in 1954 as Best Motion Picture, which McGivern shared as author of the original novel. He also published more than 100 science-fiction stories during the 1940s and 1950s. In the 1960s, he moved to Los Angeles, where he wrote for television and film.

== Biography ==
Born in Chicago to an Irish-American family, McGivern grew up in Mobile, Alabama. After serving in the Army in World War II as a sergeant where he was awarded the Soldier's Medal and studying at the University of Birmingham in England, McGivern returned to the U.S. He worked for two years as a police reporter for the Philadelphia Bulletin and later as a writer for The Evening Bulletin.

In 1947, he married Maureen Daly, a journalist and author of the bestseller Seventeenth Summer (1942). William and Maureen McGivern co-wrote Mention My Name in Mombasa: the Unscheduled Adventures of an American Family Abroad, which covered their times and adventures living overseas, including Ireland, Kenya, and Torremolinos, Spain.

His first novel was published in 1948.

In the early 1960s, McGivern moved to Los Angeles to write for film and television. His credits include the TV series Ben Casey, Adam-12, and Kojak; the William Castle film I Saw What You Did (1965); the Matt Helm film The Wrecking Crew (1968); and the John Wayne film Brannigan (1975).

== Personal life and death ==
McGivern died in Palm Desert, California in 1982, aged 63. The couple had two children, Megan McGivern Shaw (1948–1983) and Patrick McGivern (1952–2012).

== Novels ==
- But Death Runs Faster (1948) aka The Whispering Corpse
- Heaven Ran Last (1949)
- Very Cold for May (1950)
- Shield for Murder (1951) (filmed in 1954)
- Blondes Die Young (1952) (as by Bill Peters)
- The Crooked Frame (1952)
- The Big Heat (1953) (filmed in 1953)
- Margin of Terror (1953)
- Rogue Cop (1954) (filmed in 1954)
- The Darkest Hour (1955) aka Waterfront Cop (filmed in 1955 as Hell on Frisco Bay)
- The Seven File (1956) aka Chicago-7
- Night Extra (1957)
- Odds Against Tomorrow (1957) (filmed in 1959)
- Mention My Name in Mombasa (1958) (with Maureen McGivern)
- Savage Streets (1959)
- Seven Lies South (1960)
- The Road to the Snail (1961)
- A Pride of Place (1962)
- A Choice of Assassins (1963) (filmed as Un choix d'assassins in 1967)
- The Caper of the Golden Bulls (1966) (filmed in 1967)
- Lie Down, I Want to Talk to You (1967)
- Caprifoil (1972)
- Reprisal (1973)
- Night of the Juggler (1975) (filmed in 1980)
- Soldiers of '44 (1979)
- The Seeing (1980) (with Maureen McGivern)
- Summit (1982)
- War Games (1984)
- A Matter of Honor (1984) (with Maureen McGivern)

== Short stories ==
- "Killer on the Turnpike" (1961) (filmed as Nightmare in Chicago)
- "Send Along a Wreath" (2019)
