= City Detective =

American television series

- Directed by: Robert S. Finkel; Leslie H. Martinson; Robert G. Walker
- Starring: Rod Cameron
- Country of origin: United States
- No. of seasons: 2
- No. of episodes: 64

Production
- Running time: 30 minutes
- Production company: Revue Studios

Original release
- Network: Syndication
- Release: September 1953 – May 10, 1955

City Detective is a half-hour syndicated television crime drama starring Rod Cameron as Bart Grant, a tough 1950s New York City police lieutenant.

The show's title was a bit of a misnomer, as Grant fought crime "from Mexico to the Mojave Desert to New York City".

Herschel Daugherty directed the series, and Lawrence Kimble wrote for it. Blake Edwards was a writer and an associate producer.

Sixty-five episodes were produced from 1953 to 1955. Revue Productions rented space from Republic Studios for filming the series.

== Guest stars ==
- Mike Connors guest-starred as Massey in the 1955 episode "Baby in the Basket".
- Chuck Connors appeared as Sam in the 1955 episode "Trouble in Toyland".
- Walter Coy appeared as Hilton in "Christmas Pardon" on January 1, 1953.
- Fess Parker appeared as Tony in the 1955 episode "Hearts and Flowers".
- DeForest Kelley appeared twice on City Detective, as Benjamin in "An Old Man's Gold" Kelley and in "Crazy Like a Fox".
- Carolyn Jones appeared twice in the episodes "A Girl's Best Friend" and "On the Record".
- Tom Greenway appeared twice in episodes "Drop Coin Here" (1954), and "Police, Watch My House" (1955).
- Vivi Janiss was cast as Sheila, with Pierre Watkin as Davis, in "The Hypnotic Wife"
- Kim Spalding, as Johnny in "The Rebel" (1953)
- "Man Down, Woman Screaming" featured Beverly Garland, Jack Kelly, Lee Van Cleef, and Frank Ferguson.
- "The Lady in the Beautiful Frame" (Olan Soule and John Doucette)
- "Too Many Grooms" (Claude Akins as Hardy)
- "The Horn That Blew Too Long" (Russ Conway as Clemson)
- "Why Should the Beautiful Die?" (Russell Johnson)
- "The Glass Thumb" (Barbara Billingsley, Frank Ferguson, and Douglas Fowley)
- "Cargo of the Midnight" (Peter Whitney)
- "The Lion Behind You" (Anthony Caruso)
- "On the Record" (Carolyn Jones)
- "Hearts and Flowers" (Eve Miller)
- "The Blonde Orchid" (Hugh Beaumont as Philip Merriam and Douglas Fowley as Detective Wes Harris)
- "Private Mouthpiece" (child actor Richard Eyer as Wester)
- "The Perfect Disguise" (Angie Dickinson)
- "Goodbye Old Paint" (Robert Bray and Vera Miles)
- "Come Back, Little Witness" (Whit Bissell)
- "Found in a Pawnshop" (J. Pat O'Malley)
- "The Beautiful Miss X" (Lynn Bari), the series finale
