= The Big Heat =

1953 American crime film by Fritz Lang

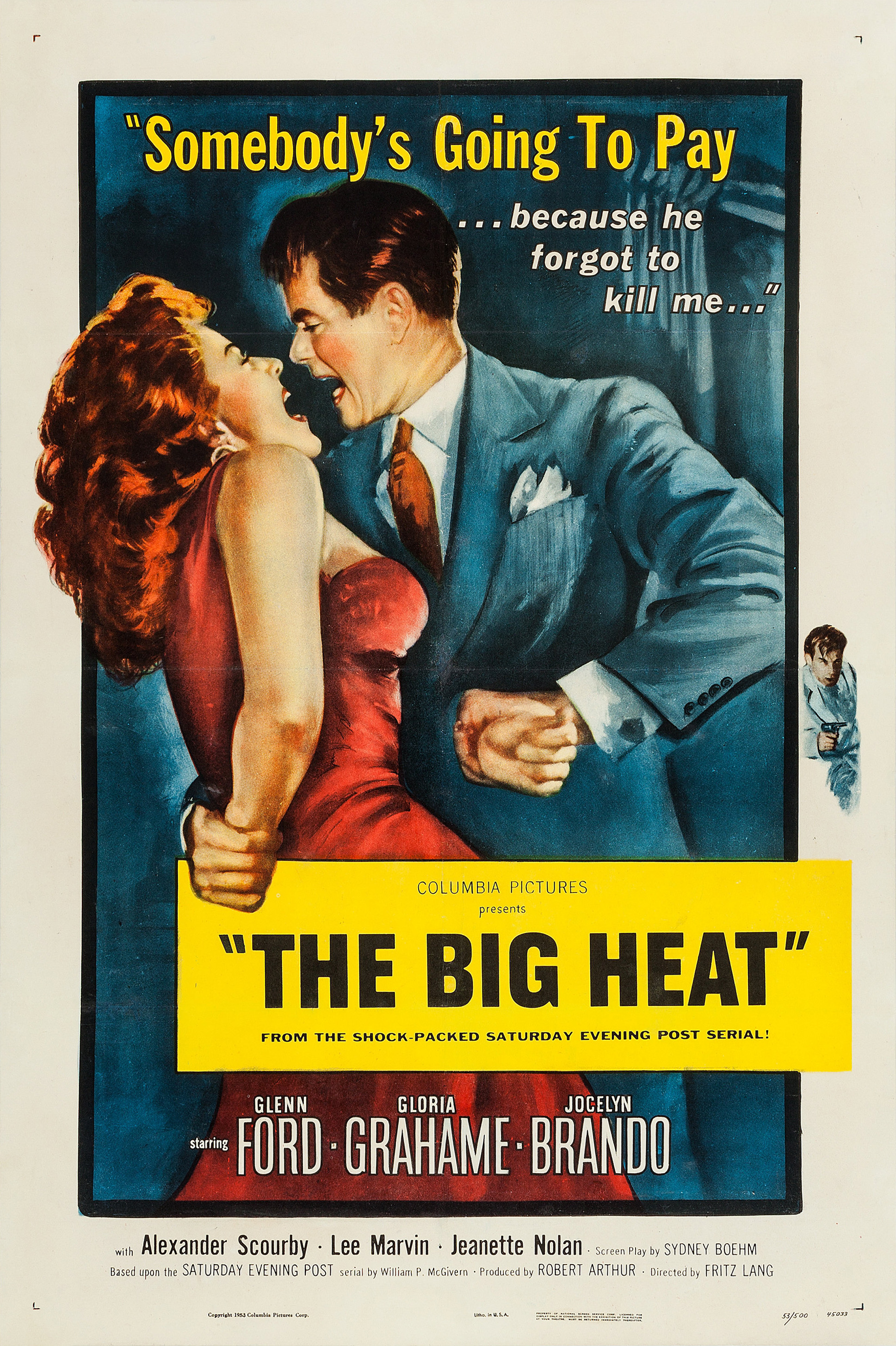
- Theatrical release poster
- Directed by: Fritz Lang
- Screenplay by: Sydney Boehm
- Based on: the Saturday Evening Post serial and 1953 novel by William P. McGivern
- Produced by: Robert Arthur
- Starring: Glenn Ford Gloria Grahame Jocelyn Brando
- Cinematography: Charles Lang
- Edited by: Charles Nelson
- Music by: Henry Vars
- Color process: Black and white
- Production company: Columbia Pictures
- Distributed by: Columbia Pictures
- Release date: October 14, 1953 (New York City)
- Running time: 90 minutes
- Country: United States
- Language: English
- Box office: $1.25 million (US)

The Big Heat is a 1953 American film noir directed by Fritz Lang starring Glenn Ford, Gloria Grahame, and Jocelyn Brando about a cop who takes on the crime syndicate that controls his city.

William P. McGivern's serial in The Saturday Evening Post, published as a novel in 1953, was the basis for the screenplay, written by former crime reporter Sydney Boehm.

The film was selected for preservation in the National Film Registry of the Library of Congress in 2011.

== Plot ==
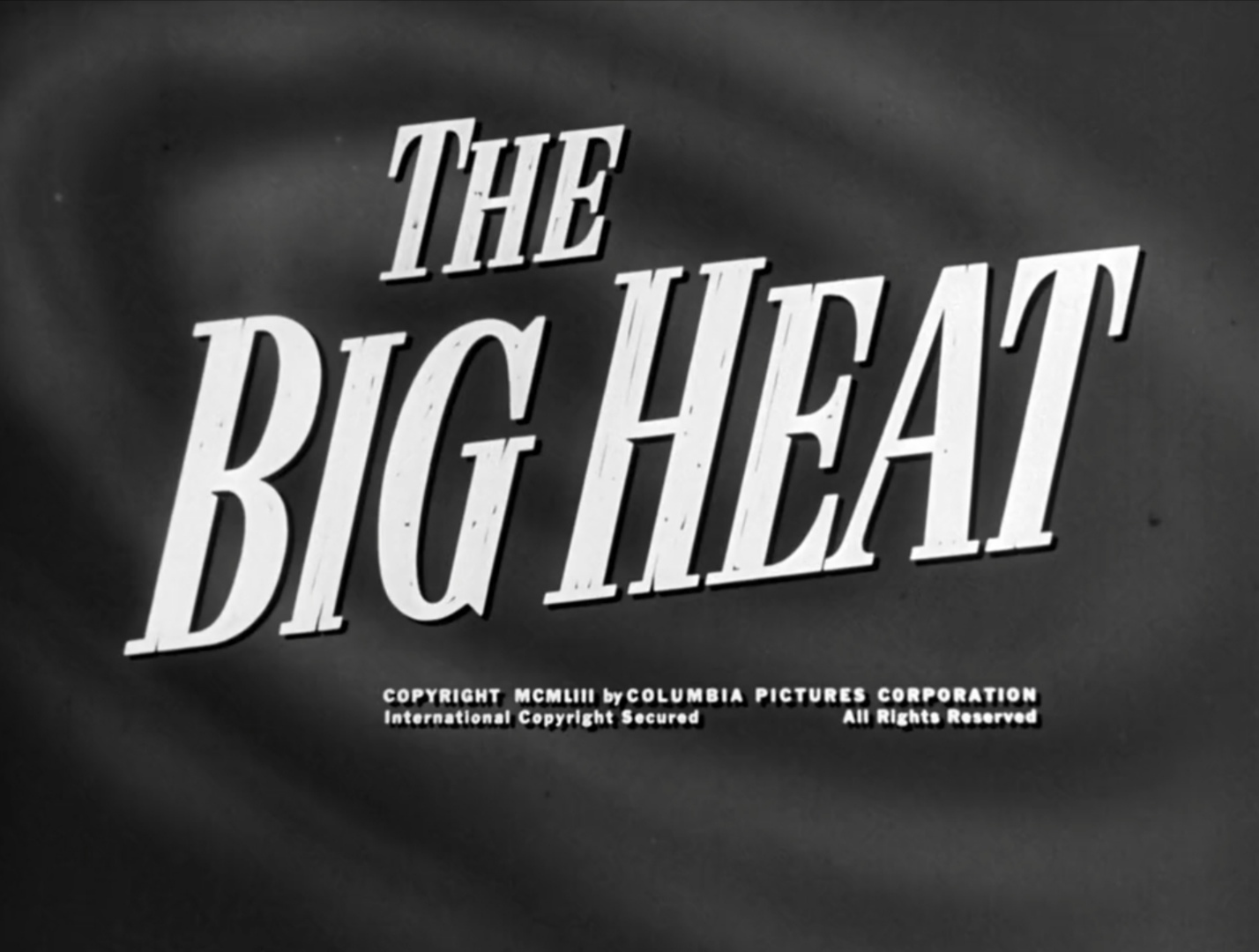
The title screen

Homicide detective Sergeant Dave Bannion, of the Kenport Police Department, is called on to investigate the suicide of a fellow officer, Tom Duncan. Duncan leaves behind a letter addressed to the district attorney. His wife, Bertha, finds the envelope and locks it away in her safe deposit box. She tells Bannion that her husband was depressed because he was in ill health.

The mistress of the late cop, Lucy Chapman, contradicts Mrs. Duncan, telling Bannion that Tom Duncan had not been in ill health, and had no reason to kill himself, but had recently agreed to a divorce with his wife. The next day, Lieutenant Ted Wilks is under pressure from "upstairs" to close the case, and orders Bannion to drop his investigation. Lucy is found strangled to death, her body covered with cigarette burns. Bannion receives threatening calls at his home. He confronts Mike Lagana, a mob boss who runs the city, and discovers that people are too scared to stand up to the crime syndicate. When Bannion ignores warnings to desist, his car is rigged with dynamite. The car bomb kills his wife, Katie. Accusing his superiors of corruption, Bannion insults corrupt Police Commissioner Higgins, accusing him of obeying the orders of Lagana. Higgins puts Bannion on immediate suspension and orders him to turn in his badge. Determined to find those responsible for his wife's murder, Bannion continues to investigate.

He hopes to discover a lead at a nightclub called "The Retreat". When Lagana's second-in-command, Vince Stone, punishes a woman there, burning her with a cigar butt, Bannion stands up to him and his thugs. This impresses Stone's girlfriend, Debby Marsh. The two hit it off and take a cab to the hotel where he is now living. When Debby accidentally reminds Bannion about his late wife, he tells her to leave. Debby reluctantly returns to Stone's penthouse. He accuses her of talking to Bannion about his activities and throws a pot of boiling coffee in her face. Higgins, who had been playing poker with Stone and his group there, takes her to a hospital.

Debby returns to Bannion at his hotel, the left side of her face badly burned and covered in bandages. For protection, he puts her in a hotel room close to his. Debby identifies the man who arranged the planting of the car bomb as Larry Gordon, one of Stone's associates. She also tells him where Gordon is staying. Bannion forces Gordon to admit to the car-bombing, and to reveal that Duncan's widow is blackmailing Stone and Lagana with incriminating documents. Bannion does not kill Gordon, but promises to spread the word that he talked. Afterward, Gordon is killed by Stone's men. Bannion then confronts Mrs. Duncan, accusing her of betraying Lucy and protecting Lagana and Stone. With his hands at her throat, Bannion tells Mrs. Duncan that if she is killed, the evidence she has against Lagana will be revealed. Before Bannion can follow through on his threats, cops sent by Lagana arrive, and he is forced to leave.

Bannion goes to deal with Stone when Lieutenant Wilks arrives, now prepared to take a stand against the mob and his corrupt boss. Debby goes to Mrs. Duncan and starts talking about their respective associations with gangsters. When Mrs. Duncan attempts to phone Stone for help, Debby shoots her dead.

Bannion tails Stone, who returns to his penthouse where Debby is waiting for him. She throws boiling coffee in his face in an act of revenge. In retaliation, Stone shoots her. After a short gun battle, Bannion captures Stone. As Debby dies on the floor, she confesses to shooting Mrs. Duncan. Stone is arrested for murder and officer Duncan's damning evidence in the note he left behind for the D.A. is made public. Lagana and Higgins are indicted, and Bannion is reinstated to his job as a homicide detective.

== Cast ==
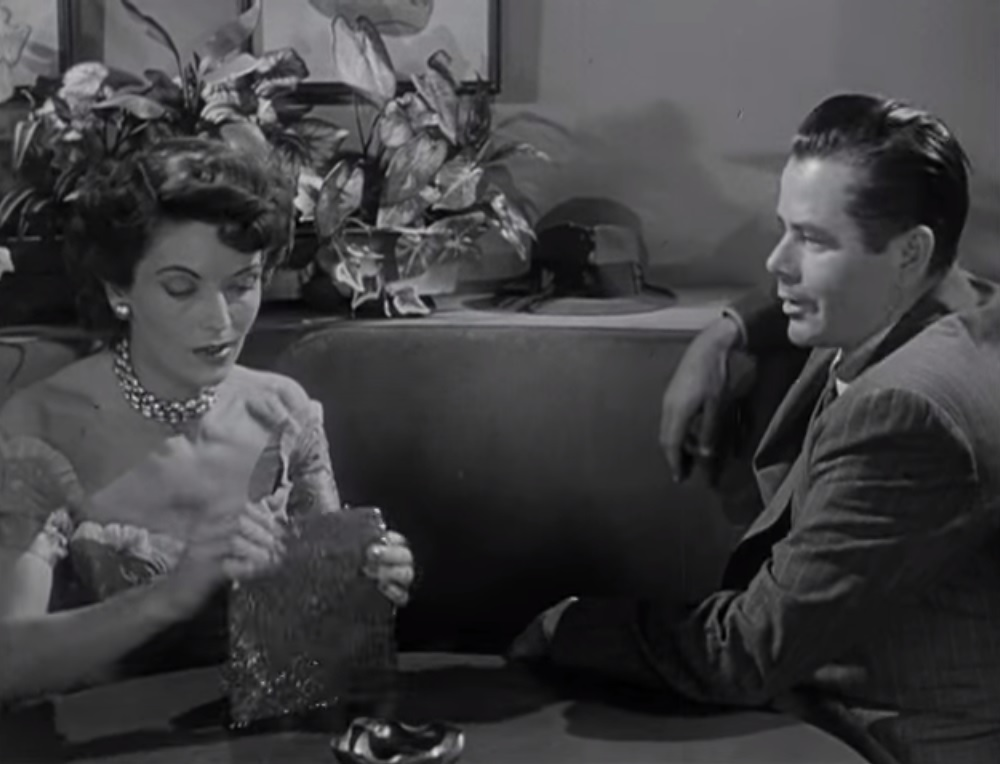
Dorothy Green as Lucy Chapman and Glenn Ford as Dave Bannion

- Glenn Ford as Dave Bannion
- Gloria Grahame as Debby Marsh
- Jocelyn Brando as Katie Bannion
- Alexander Scourby as Mike Lagana
- Lee Marvin as Vince Stone
- Jeanette Nolan as Bertha Duncan
- Peter Whitney as Tierney
- Willis Bouchey as Lt. Ted Wilks
- Howard Wendell as Commissioner Higgins
- Robert Burton as Gus Burke
- Adam Williams as Larry Gordon
- Dorothy Green as Lucy Chapman (uncredited)
- Dan Seymour as Mr. Atkins (uncredited)
- Edith Evanson as Selma Parker (uncredited)
- John Crawford as Al – Bannion's Brother-in-Law (uncredited)
- Carolyn Jones – Doris – crying blonde at The Retreat (uncredited)

== Production ==
The film was based on a serialized fiction by William P. McGivern, which appeared in the Saturday Evening Post from December 1952 and was published as a novel in 1953. Initially, McGivern's novel was to be produced by Jerry Wald, who wanted either Paul Muni, George Raft or Edward G. Robinson (who worked with director Fritz Lang in Woman in the Window and Scarlet Street) for the role of Dave Bannion. Columbia Pictures paid $40,000 for McGivern's novel. Lang directed the film while Sydney Boehm adapted it.

Boehm changed many details from the novel:

- Commissioner Higgins is not in the novel and Lieutenant Wilks is the corrupt policeman. An honest policeman called Cranston, who was in the novel, was omitted from the film.
- In the novel, it is not known until the end that the widow of the policeman who had killed himself (named Deery in the book, Duncan in the film) was blackmailing Lagana. Debby shoots her and then mortally wounds herself; in the film, Debby is shot by Stone.
- After Stone is cornered by Bannion, Stone is killed by another policeman; in the film, Stone survives the scuffle but is later arrested.
- Instead of taking place in Philadelphia, the film takes place in a fictional U.S. city named Kenport.

Columbia wanted Marilyn Monroe to play the part of Debby Marsh but did not want to pay the fee 20th Century Fox demanded for the loan of their star, so Gloria Grahame was cast instead.

Rex Reason was slated to play either Tierney or Detective Burke, but his agent wanted a larger part. In the end, Reason was not cast and Peter Whitney and Robert Burton got the roles of Tierney and Burke, respectively.

In the scene at the bar where Stone and Bannion first meet, the house band is performing "Put the Blame on Mame," a song also heard in the 1946 noir classic Gilda, also starring Ford, and also produced by Columbia.

== Preservation ==
The Academy Film Archive preserved The Big Heat in 1997.

== Critical response ==
"The... memorable violence in The Big Heat... implies that the world must be destroyed before it can be purified."

— Film historian Andrew Sarris in "You Ain’t Heard Nothin' Yet": The American Talking Film History & Memory, 1927–1949.

The New York Times and Variety both gave The Big Heat very positive reviews at the time. Bosley Crowther of the Times described Glenn Ford "as its taut, relentless star" and praised Lang for bringing "forth a hot one with a sting." Variety characterized Lang's direction as "tense" and "forceful." Critic Roger Ebert subsequently praised the film's supporting actors and added the film to his personal canon of "Great Movies".

Writer David M. Meyer states that the film never overcomes the basic repulsiveness of its hero, but notes that some parts of the film, though violent, are better than the film as a whole: "Best known is Gloria Grahame's disfigurement at the hands of psycho-thug Lee Marvin, who flings hot coffee into her face."

According to film critic Grant Tracey, the film turns the role of the femme fatale on its head: "Whereas many noirs contain the tradition of the femme-fatale, the deadly spiderwoman who destroys her man and his family and career, The Big Heat inverts this narrative paradigm, making Ford [Det. Bannion] the indirect agent of fatal destruction. All four women he meets—from clip joint singer, Lucy Chapman, to gun moll Debby—are destroyed."

On the review aggregator website Rotten Tomatoes, 95% of 74 critics' reviews are positive. The website's consensus reads: "Presented with stark power by director Fritz Lang, The Big Heat is a delightfully grim noir that peers into the heart of darkness without blinking."

== Awards and honors ==
The film is recognized by American Film Institute in these lists:

- 2001: AFI's 100 Years...100 Thrills – Nominated
- 2005: AFI's 100 Years...100 Movie Quotes:
  - Debby Marsh: "We're sisters under the mink." – Nominated
- 2008: AFI's 10 Top 10:
  - Nominated Mystery Film
  - Nominated Gangster Film

In December 2011, The Big Heat was selected for inclusion in the Library of Congress' National Film Registry. Proclaiming it "one of the great post-war noir films", the Registry stated that The Big Heat "manages to be both stylized and brutally realistic, a signature of its director Fritz Lang."

== Home media ==
The Big Heat was released on DVD in Region 1 on December 18, 2001, by Sony Pictures. Twilight Time released two limited edition Blu-rays in 2012 and 16. In July 2025, it was released in 4K and standard Blu-ray formats by The Criterion Collection.

== See also ==
- List of American films of 1953
- List of cult films

== Bibliography ==
- Sarris, Andrew. 1998. “You Ain’t Heard Nothin’ Yet.” The American Talking Film History & Memory, 1927–1949. Oxford University Press. ISBN 0195134265
