= Creature with the Atom Brain =

Creature with the Atom Brain may refer to:

- Creature with the Atom Brain (film), 1955 American zombie horror science fiction film
- Creature with the Atom Brain (band), Belgian alternative rock band
