= Clay Campbell =

Clay Campbell may refer to:

- Clay Campbell (make-up artist)
- Clay Campbell (racing driver)
