= The Giant Claw =

1957 film by Fred F. Sears

- Theatrical release half-sheet display poster
- Directed by: Fred F. Sears
- Written by: Samuel Newman; Paul Gangelin
- Produced by: Sam Katzman
- Starring: Jeff Morrow; Mara Corday; Robert Shayne; Morris Ankrum; Dabbs Greer
- Narrated by: Fred F. Sears
- Cinematography: Benjamin H. Kline
- Edited by: Anthony Dimarco; Saul A. Goodkind
- Music by: Mischa Bakaleinikoff (uncredited)
- Color process: Black and white
- Production company: Clover Productions
- Distributed by: Columbia Pictures
- Release date: June 1957 (United States)
- Running time: 75 minutes
- Country: United States
- Language: English

The Giant Claw is a 1957 American monster film from Columbia Pictures, produced by Sam Katzman, directed by Fred F. Sears, stars Jeff Morrow and Mara Corday, and features Morris Ankrum, Dabbs Greer, and Robert Shayne. Both Sears and Katzman were well known as low-budget B-film genre filmmakers. The film was released as a double feature with The Night the World Exploded.

== Plot ==
Mitch MacAfee, a civil aeronautical engineer, spots an unidentified flying object (UFO) while engaged in a radar test flight in the Arctic. Jet fighters are scrambled to pursue and identify the object, despite it not appearing on radar, but one aircraft goes missing. Major Bergen is initially angry at MacAfee over the loss of the jet and its pilot, believing MacAfee was playing a bad joke. His attitude changes, though, when news of a missing airliner comes in; the pilot had reported a UFO, which again, did not show up on the military's radar, before the transmission was cut off.

As MacAfee and mathematician Sally Caldwell fly back to New York City, their aircraft also comes under attack from a UFO. With their pilot dead, they crash land in the Adirondacks, where Pierre Broussard, a French Canadian farmer, comes to their rescue. That night, Pierre investigates a disturbance and reports seeing a giant monster bird that he calls la Carcagne. In the meantime, three more planes disappear, the pilot of the last reporting a bird "as big as a battleship" before going silent. MacAfee is finally believed, and photographs from Caldwell's observation balloons prove the bird's existence. An attempt by jets to kill the bird ends in disaster, leading Dr. Karol Noymann to propose that it came from an antimatter galaxy, explaining its immunity to both weaponry and radar. Now knowing what they are up against, MacAfee, Caldwell, Noymann, General Edward Considine, and General Van Buskirk work feverishly to develop a way to defeat the seemingly invincible creature.

The bird soon reveals itself to the world at large, going on a mass killing spree with nothing, not even nuclear weapons, being able to stop it. Worse, Caldwell realizes that the bird came to Earth to build a nest, leading MacAfee and her to return to Pierre's land to find it. They successfully destroy the bird's egg, but Pierre is killed while trying to escape the enraged mother. Back in Washington, DC, MacAfee proposes using mesic atoms to disrupt the bird's antimatter energy screen, allowing it to be killed.

The climactic showdown takes place in Manhattan, when the gigantic bird attacks both the Empire State Building and the United Nations building. The mesic atoms, deployed from the tailgun position of a B-25 bomber, successfully collapse the creature's antimatter shield, allowing Buskirk and Considine to kill the monster with rockets. The giant bird plummets into the Atlantic Ocean off New York City, the last sight of it being a giant claw sinking beneath the waves.

== Cast ==
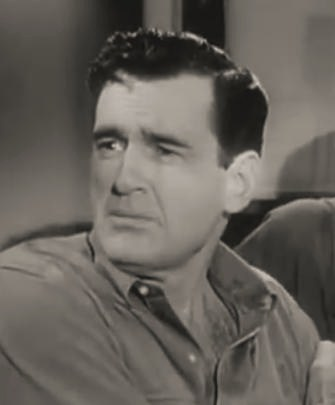
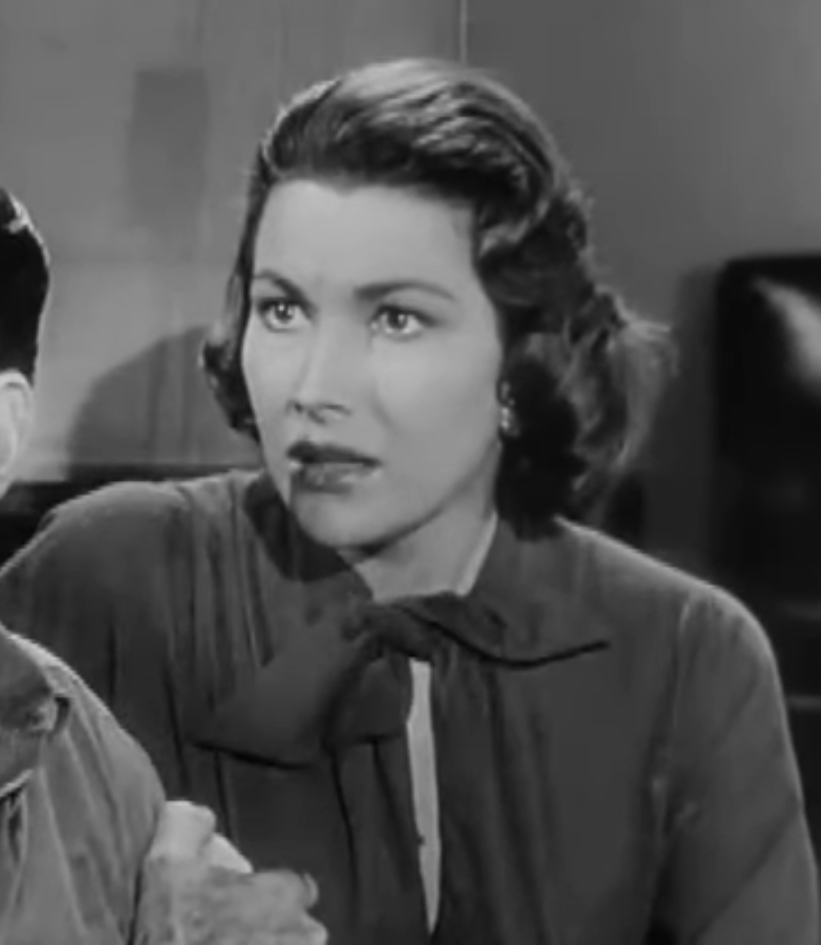
  Jeff Morrow and Mara Corday in The Giant Claw
  Jeff Morrow as Mitch MacAfee
- Mara Corday as Sally Caldwell
- Morris Ankrum as Lt. Gen Edward Considine
- Lou Merrill as Pierre Broussard (as Louis D. Merrill)
- Edgar Barrier as Dr. Karol Noymann
- Robert Shayne as Gen. Van Buskirk
- Frank Griffin as Pete, pilot (as Ruell Shayne)
- Clark Howat as Maj. Bergen
- Morgan Jones as Lieutenant, Radar Officer
- Benjie Bancroft as Civil Aeronautics Board Member
- Brad Brown as pool party diver
- Al Cantor as AF projectionist
- Dabbs Greer as fighter pilot
- George Cisar as Admonishing Man on Airliner
- Bud Cokes as Civil Aeronautics Board Member
- Leonard P. Geer as Paramedic
- Sol Murgi as Civil Aeronautics Board Member
- Robert B. Williams as first State Trooper

== Production ==
According to Richard Harland Smith of Turner Classic Movies, the inspiration for the story may have been taken from media reports about scientific discoveries in the field of particle physics, dealing with matter and antimatter. Other influences included the Japanese film Rodan (1956) and the Samuel Hopkins Adams story "Grandfather and a Winter's Tale", about la Carcagne, the "mythical bird-like banshee from French-Canadian folklore". The Adams story was published in The New Yorker in January 1951.

A character in The Giant Claw (Pierre Broussard) mistakes the menacing bird for la Carcagne, said to be a monster resembling a giant woman with a wolf's head and bat-like black wings and which, like the banshee, is a harbinger of death.

Under the working title Mark of the Claw, principal photography took place at Griffith Park, substituting for the New York-Canada border, with interiors filmed at the Columbia Annex near Monogram Studios from February 1 to 20, 1957. Katzman originally planned to use stop motion effects by Ray Harryhausen, but due to budget constraints, he instead hired a low-budget special-effects studio in Mexico City to create the mythical creature that would be the showpiece of the production. The result, however, was a poorly made "marionette". The puppet's construction was so underwhelming that a common misconception stating it was made in Mexico City for only $50 became very popular, but no credible sources support this assertion.

Morrow later confessed in an interview that no one in the film knew what the titular monster looked like until the film's premiere. Morrow himself first saw the film in his hometown, and hearing the audience laugh every time the monster appeared on screen, he left the theater early, embarrassed that anyone there might recognize him; he allegedly went home and began drinking.

In May 1957, Sam Katzman stated in an interview with Variety that his films at the time had cost between $250,000 to $500,000. Despite the production using Columbia's B-unit, they had a much larger budget than other contemporaries.

== Reception ==
Critical reception was generally negative, with film writer and historian Bill Warren commenting, "This would have been an ordinarily bad movie of its type, with a good performance by Jeff Morrow, if the special effects had been industry standard for the time. That, however, is not what happened. The [Giant] Claw is not just badly rendered, it is hilariously rendered, resembling nothing so much as Warner Bros. cartoon-character Beaky Buzzard. Once seen, you will never forget this awesomely silly creation".

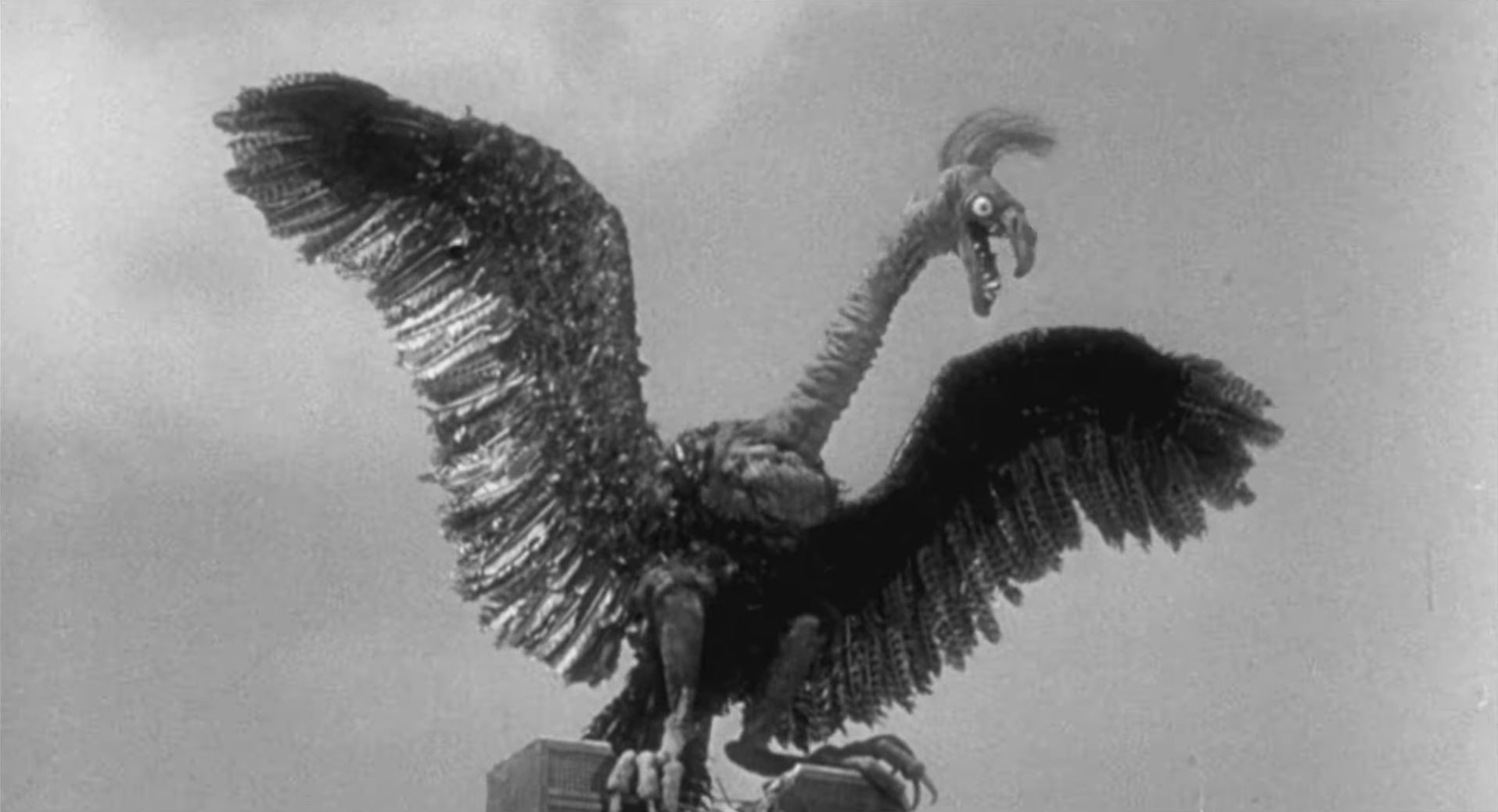
The Giant Claw, as depicted in the film

The Giant Claw has been mocked for the quality of its special effects. The menacing bird, in particular, is considered by many to be badly made, being a puppet with a very odd face. Film critic Leonard Maltin noted that the film disappointed for those reasons, "(a) lack of decent special effects ruins the running battle between colossal bird and fighter jets. Big bird is laughable".

TV Guide panned the film, awarding it a score of 1 out of 4, criticizing the film's monster as "preposterous-looking".

Not all reviews of the film were negative. Allmovie gave the film a positive review, stating, "The Giant Claw has a terrible reputation that isn't entirely deserved – to be sure, producer Sam Katzman opted for the cheapest, worst-looking monster that one could imagine, a ridiculous-looking giant bird puppet that makes the movie seem ludicrous. But except for those moments when the title monster is on the screen, the movie isn't bad – so for the first 27 minutes, until it appears for the first time and evokes its first rounds of laughter, the picture is working just fine within the confines of its budget, script, and cast". Allmovie also complimented Morrow's performance as "the best thing in the picture".

== Home media ==
The Giant Claw had been a staple of the bootleg video market, with only two official VHS releases (one in the United States by Goodtimes Home Video and the other by Screamtime in the United Kingdom).

In October 2007, Sony Pictures Home Entertainment released the film on DVD as part of the two-disc, four-film set, Icons of Horror Collection: Sam Katzman, along with three other films produced by Katzman: Creature with the Atom Brain (1955), The Werewolf (1956) and Zombies of Mora Tau (1957).

On February 25, 2014, Mill Creek Entertainment (under license from Sony Pictures) included the film on the Sci-Fi Creature Classics DVD alongside 20 Million Miles to Earth, It Came from Beneath the Sea, and Mothra.

In 2021, it was released on Blu-ray by Arrow Films as part of the limited-edition Cold War Creatures: Four Films from Sam Katzman set. The other films included were Creature with the Atom Brain, The Werewolf, and Zombies of Mora Tau.

== See also ==
- List of American films of 1957
- Z movie
- List of Columbia Pictures films
- The Flying Serpent, 1946 film
