= I Am the Golden Gate Bridge =

Studio album by Creature with the Atom Brain
- Released: 2008
- Recorded: 2008
- Genre: Rock, alternative rock
- Label: Munich Records

Creature with the Atom Brain chronology
I Am the Golden Gate Bridge (2008)	Transylvania (2009)

Professional ratings
Review scores
Source	Rating
The Dreaded Press	Positive
Music in Belgium	3/5 stars

I Am the Golden Gate Bridge is the first album by rock band Creature with the Atom Brain. It was released in 2008 on the Munich Records label. The name was inspired by the documentary The Bridge.

== Track listing ==
1. "The Psychedelic World of the Creature With the Atom Brain"
2. "16 Inch Revolver"
3. "Black Out, New Hit"
4. "Mind Your Own God"
5. "Is That Lady Sniff?"
6. "Broken Flowers Grow"
7. "Not a Sect"
8. "Blackened Roses, Same Ol' Doses"
9. "Park My Car Outside the Record Store"
10. "Rapeman's Scalp"
11. "Crawl Like a Dog"
12. "I'm Gonna Roll"
