= Transylvania (Creature with the Atom Brain album) =

Studio album by Creature with the Atom Brain
- Released: 10 April 2009
- Recorded: 2009
- Studio: Studio Jezus, Hoboken, Antwerp, Belgium
- Genre: Psychedelic rock, alternative rock, indie rock
- Length: 46:50
- Label: Munich Records/Sacred Love (Belgium); The End (US)

Creature with the Atom Brain chronology
| I Am The Golden Gate Bridge (2007) | Transylvania (2009) |

Professional ratings
Review scores
| Source | Rating |
|---|---|
| AllMusic | 3.5/5 stars |
| Classic Rock | 8/10 stars |
| Drowned in Sound | 5/10 |
| Just Press Play | 7/10 stars |

Transylvania is a studio album released in 2009 by the Belgian alternative rock band Creature with the Atom Brain. It was described by Drowned in Sound as "a bit like Alien: Resurrection."

== Track listing ==
All music by Creature with the Atom Brain, all lyrics by Aldo Struyf

1. "I Rise the Moon" – 3:20
2. "The Color of Sundown" – 4:32
3. "Something Is Wrong" – 4:21
4. "Transylvania" – 6:01
5. "Lonely Light" – 5:25
6. "Spinnin' the Black Hole" – 3:37
7. "Darker Than a Dungeon" – 7:15
8. "Sound of Confusion" – 3:06
9. "Make Noise" – 3:01
10. "The Lonesome Whistle" – 6:12

== Personnel ==
Creature with the Atom Brain

- Aldo Struyf – guitar, vocals, engineer
- Michiel Van Cleuvenbergen – guitar
- Jan Wygers – bass
- Dave Schroyen – drums, percussion

Additional musicians

- Mark Lanegan – vocals on "Lonely Light"
- Koen Kohlbacher – vocals on "Lonely Light" and "Darker Than a Dungeon"
- Chris Goss – drum machine and backing vocals on "Lonely Light", mixing
- Pascal Deweze – keyboards, engineer

Production

- Pieter Van Buyten – engineer
- Edmund Monsef – mixing engineer
- John Golden – mastering
