= S. John Launer =

American actor (1919–2006)

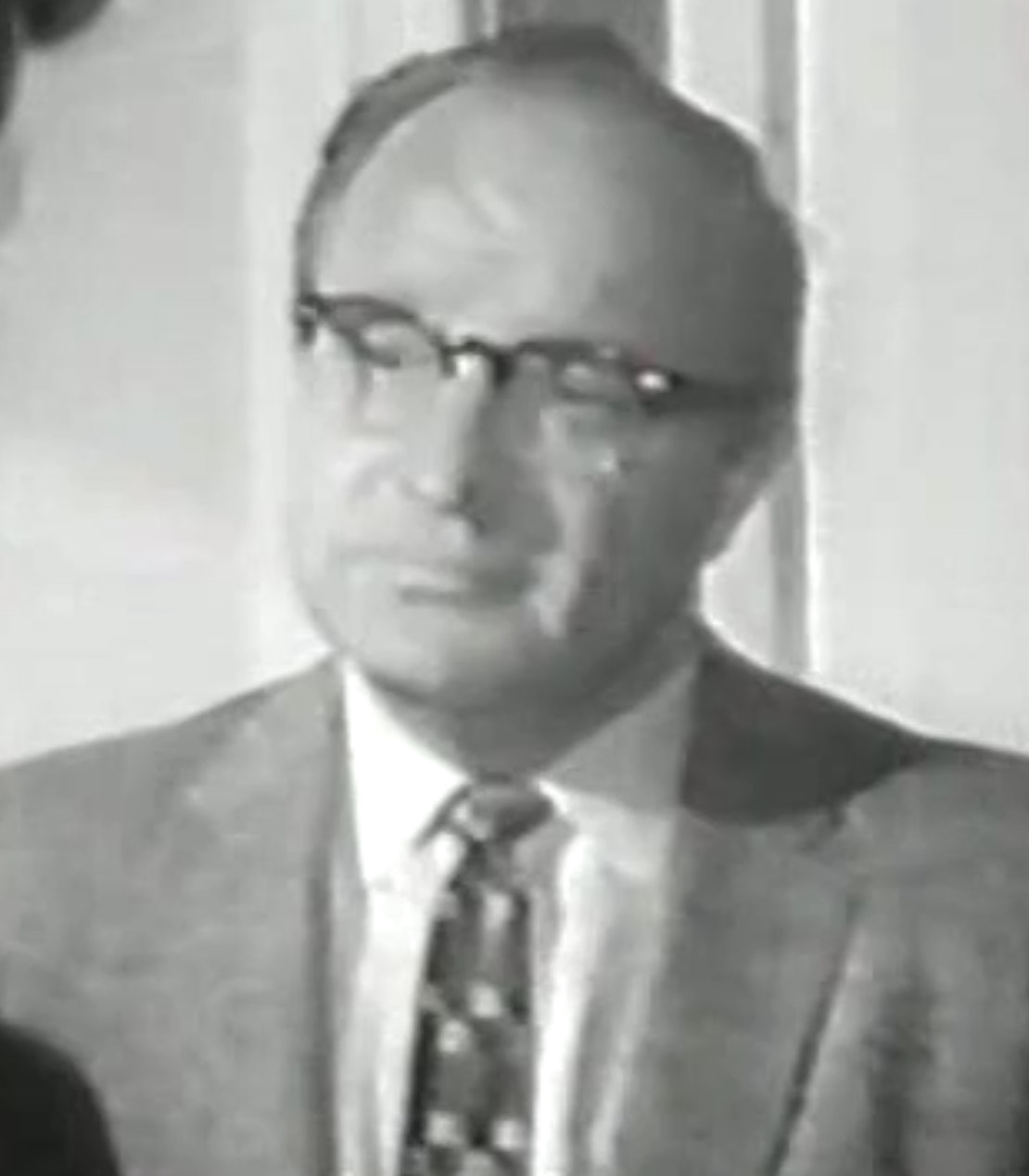
- Launer in Richard Diamond, Private Detective (1957)
- Born: Saul John Launer; November 5, 1919; Cleveland, Ohio, U.S.
- Died: September 8, 2006 (aged 86); Tarzana, California, U.S.
- Years active: 1955–1987
- Spouse: Estelle Launer
- Children: 2, including Dale Launer

Saul John Launer (November 5, 1919 – September 8, 2006), was an American television and film actor. Launer was born in Cleveland, Ohio.

== Career ==
Launer appeared in 89 films and television programs between 1943 and 1977. In most of his films, he is uncredited. His first acting role was in the television series Meet Corliss Archer (1954) and his career ended with the film Billionaire Boys Club (1987).

In 1956, he performed in Calder Willingham's play End as a Man at the Players Ring Gallery in West Hollywood. A review by Jerry Pam in the Valley Times said Launer's performance was "at times, too philosophical" but that he seemed at home with children and that his end speech was "exciting".

Launer's film credits include The Werewolf (1956), I Was a Teenage Werewolf (1957), Jailhouse Rock (1957), The Crowded Sky (1960), Marnie (1964), and Pendulum (1969).

His television credits include Father Knows Best (1956), The Ford Television Theatre (1956–57), The George Sanders Mystery Theater (1957), State Trooper (1958), Wagon Train S1 E34 (1958), Dr. Kildare (1963), The Twilight Zone (1959–63), Dragnet (1969–70), Harry O (1973–74). He also acted in the Gunsmoke episode "Robin Hood."

Launer was injured in a stagecoach accident on the set of Laramie in 1960. Launer, who had been riding inside the stagecoach, received lacerations, while another actor, Bert Spencer, was harmed to the point that one of his legs required amputation.

His most famous role was his nine years as a criminal court judge on Perry Mason.

== Personal life and death ==
Launer had a son and a daughterr. He died of natural causes on September 8, 2006, in Tarzana, California, aged 86.

== Filmography ==
| Year | Title | Role | Notes |
|---|---|---|---|
| 1955 | Creature with the Atom Brain | Captain Dave Harris | |
| 1956 | Uranium Boom | Mac | |
| 1956 | The Werewolf | Dr. Emery Forrest | |
| 1957 | Crime of Passion | Chief of Police | Uncredited |
| 1957 | I Was a Teenage Werewolf | Bill Logan | |
| 1957 | Jailhouse Rock | Judge | Uncredited |
| 1957 | Zero Hour! | Vancouver Switchboard Operator | Uncredited |
| 1958 | Sing Boy Sing | Tailor / Manufacturer | Uncredited |
| 1960 | Ice Palace | Chairman | Uncredited |
| 1960 | The Crowded Sky | Police Officer | Uncredited |
| 1963 | The Alfred Hitchcock Hour | Edwin C. 'Ed' Rutherford, Defense Attorney | Season 2 Episode 7: "Starring the Defense" |
| 1964 | Marnie | Sam Ward | |
| 1964 | Apache Rifles | General Nelson | |
| 1966 | The Venetian Affair | Mr. Pennyman | Uncredited |
| 1968 | Speedway | Mayor Fiergol | Uncredited |
| 1969 | Pendulum | Judge Kinsella | |
| 1976 | Gable and Lombard | The Judge | |
| 1978 | A Question of Love | The Judge | TV movie |
| 1981 | Mommie Dearest | Pepsi Chairman | |
