= Captain Lightfoot =

1955 film by Douglas Sirk

- Film poster by Reynold Brown
- Directed by: Douglas Sirk
- Screenplay by: W. R. Burnett; Oscar Brodney
- Based on: a novel by W. R. Burnett
- Produced by: Ross Hunter
- Starring: Rock Hudson; Barbara Rush; Jeff Morrow
- Cinematography: Irving Glassberg
- Edited by: Frank Gross
- Music by: Heinz Roemheld; Herman Stein
- Production company: Universal Pictures
- Distributed by: Universal Pictures
- Release dates: February 18, 1955 (Chicago, Illinois); March 26, 1955 (United States)
- Running time: 92 minutes
- Country: United States
- Language: English
- Box office: $1.3 million (US)

Captain Lightfoot is a 1955 American CinemaScope Technicolor adventure film directed by Douglas Sirk starring Rock Hudson, Barbara Rush and Jeff Morrow and is Sirk's adaptation of a book by W. R. Burnett written in 1954.

The movie is set in the early 19th century with the hero and his brother-in-arms becoming highwaymen, robbing the wealthy around the foothills of Dublin, Ireland. Captain Lightfoot falls in love, and the ensuing drama threatens everyone's safety.

The movie was filmed around Clogherhead, County Louth, Marlay Park in Rathfarnham, County Dublin, and in the Powerscourt Estate in Enniskerry, County Wicklow. Slane Castle in Slane County Meath was used as the exterior of Ballymore Castle.

Director/writer Michael Cimino used the nicknames of Martin and Doherty for the main characters in his debut feature film, Thunderbolt and Lightfoot (1974).

== Plot ==
In 1815, Michael Martin, member of an Irish revolutionary society, turns highwayman to support it, and soon becomes an outlaw. In Dublin, he meets famous rebel "Captain Thunderbolt" and becomes his second-in-command, under the name "Lightfoot."

== Cast ==
- Rock Hudson as Michael Martin, aka "Lightfoot"
- Barbara Rush as Aga Doherty
- Jeff Morrow as John Doherty, aka "Capt. Thunderbolt"
- Kathleen Ryan as Lady Anne More
- Finlay Currie as Callahan
- Denis O'Dea as Regis Donnell
- Geoffrey Toone as Captain Hood
- Hilton Edwards as Lord Glen
- Sheila Brennan as Waitress
- Harry Goldblatt as Brady
- Charles B. Fitzsimons as Dan Shanley
- Christopher Casson as Lord Clonmell
- Philip O'Flynn as Trim

== Production ==
W.R. Burnett said "Sirk was a very bad job of miscasting" on the film as "He had no sense of humor. And Captain Lightfoot is a light piece, full of humor."

== See also ==
- List of American films of 1955
