= Zombies of Mora Tau =

1957 film by Edward L. Cahn

- Theatrical release half-sheet display poster
- Directed by: Edward L. Cahn
- Screenplay by: Bernard Gordon (as Raymond T. Marcus)
- Story by: George H. Plympton (as George Plympton)
- Produced by: Sam Katzman
- Starring: Gregg Palmer; Allison Hayes; Autumn Russell
- Cinematography: Benjamin H. Kline
- Edited by: Jack Ogilvie
- Production company: Sam Katzman Productions
- Distributed by: Columbia Pictures
- Release date: March 1957
- Running time: 69 minutes
- Country: United States
- Language: English

Zombies of Mora Tau (also known as The Dead That Walk) is a 1957 black-and-white zombie horror film directed by Edward L. Cahn and starring Gregg Palmer, Allison Hayes and Autumn Russell. Distributed by Columbia Pictures, it was produced by Sam Katzman. The screenplay was written by George H. Plympton and Bernard Gordon. Zombies of Mora Tau was released on a double bill with another Katzman-produced film, The Man Who Turned to Stone (1957).

== Plot ==
A team of deep-sea divers, led by wealthy American tycoon George Harrison (Ashley), attempts to salvage a fortune in diamonds from the wreckage of a ship that had sunk 60 years earlier off the coast of Africa. When the team arrives, they discover that the ship is cursed and the diamonds are protected by the ship's undead crew, now zombies, who are forced to guard the treasure until the diamonds are destroyed or the curse is finally lifted.

== Cast ==
- Gregg Palmer as Jeff Clark
- Allison Hayes as Mona Harrison
- Autumn Russell as Jan Peters
- Joel Ashley as George Harrison
- Morris Ankrum as Dr. Jonathan Eggert
- Marjorie Eaton as Grandmother Peters
- Gene Roth as Sam, the chauffeur
- Leonard P. Geer as Johnny (as Leonard Geer)
- Karl Davis as Zombie
- William Baskin as Zombie

== Home media ==
Sony Pictures Home Entertainment released the film on DVD in October 2007 as part of a two-disc, four-film set of Katzman-produced films called Icons of Horror Collection: Sam Katzman. The set contains Zombies of Mora Tau, Creature with the Atom Brain, The Werewolf and The Giant Claw.

A 2021 blu-ray release by Arrow Films in the U.K. and USA grouped the same four films together alongside a few new extras in a box set called Cold War Creatures: Four Films from Sam Katzman. The film includes a commentary track by author and film critic Kat Ellinger.

== Reception ==
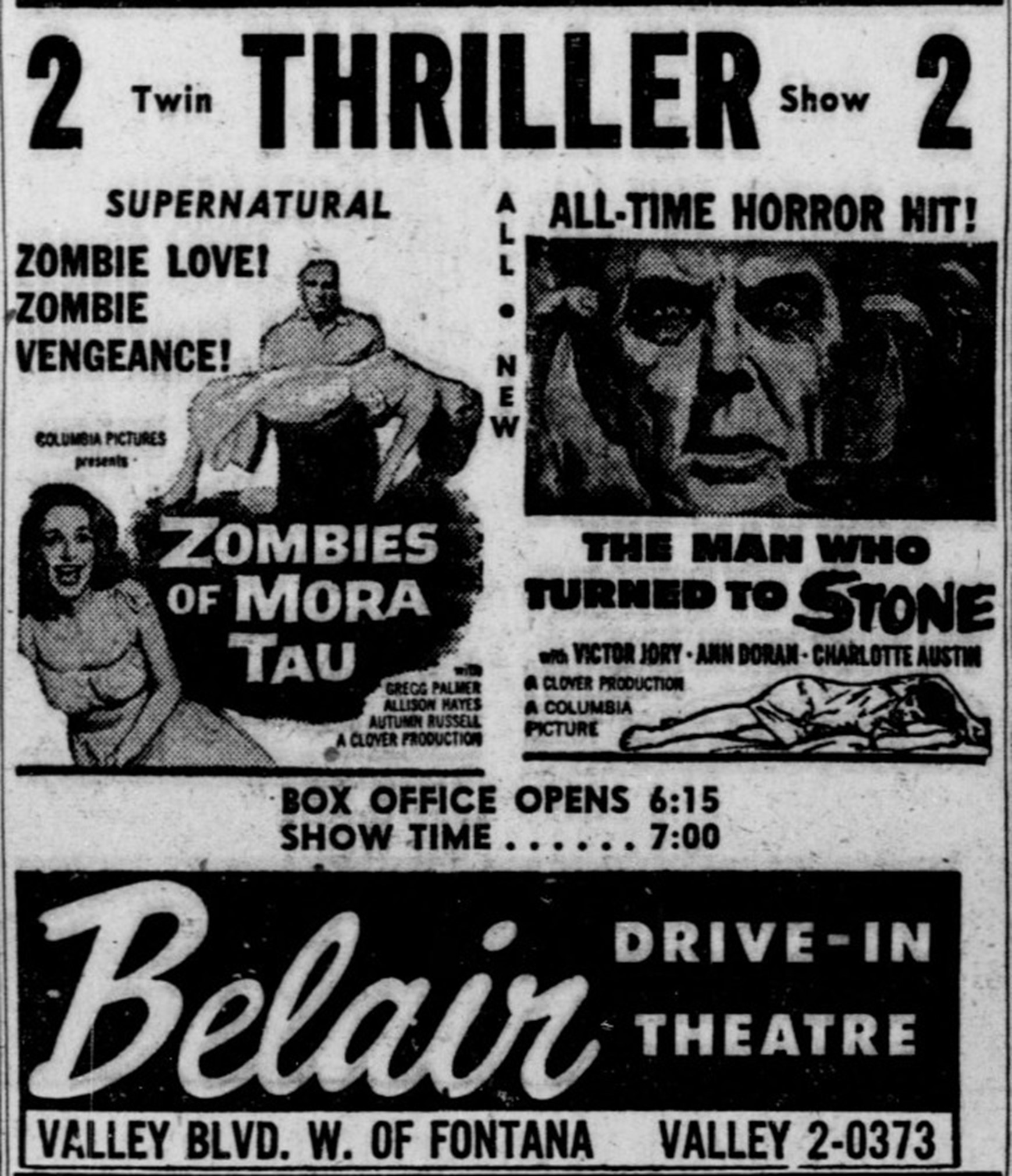
Drive-in advertisement from 1957 for Zombies of Mora Tau and co-feature, The Man Who Turned to Stone.

David Maine of PopMatters rated the film 6 out of 10 stars and described it as "pretty entertaining overall, and enlivened immeasurably by Ms. Eaton’s feisty grandma". TV Guide rated it 2 out of 5 stars and called it "standard horror quality for grade-B films". Writing in The Zombie Movie Encyclopedia, academic critic Peter Dendle said, "This awkward and talentless movie is nonetheless surprisingly prescient in zombie film history, anticipating a number of motifs that would reappear in later decades". Zombiemania: 80 Movies to Die For author Arnold T. Blumberg wrote that the film is "a fun late-night creature feature, but it's prone to boring passages and a low-rent production quality that never allows it to break out of the B-movie mold", adding that the film is "almost single-handedly saved by the Maria Ouspenskaya/Celia Lovsky stylings of actress Marjorie Eaton, who lends the film an impressive conviction as well as a wry approach to her already sharp dialogue".

== See also ==
- List of zombie films
