= Jefferson Drum =

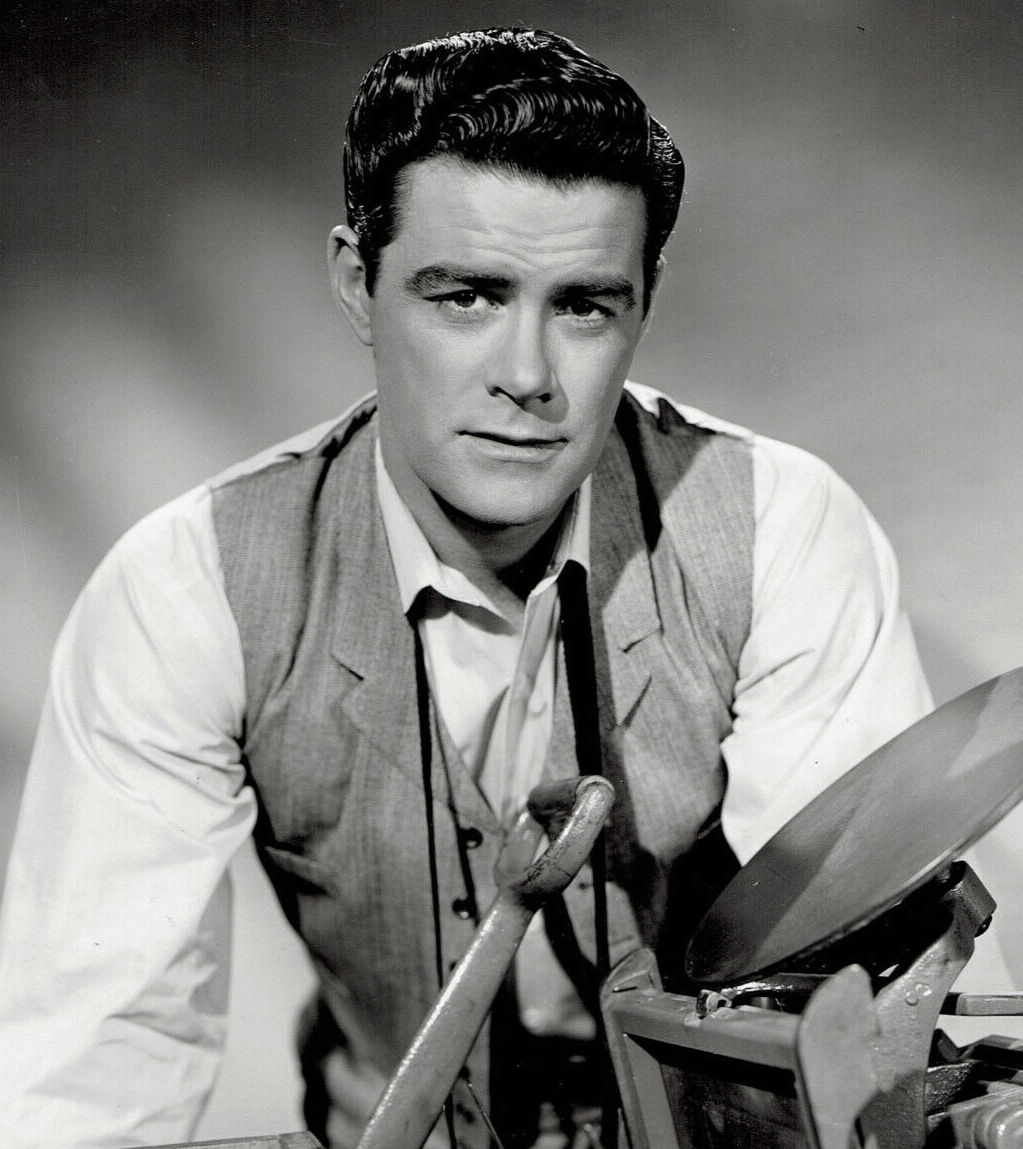
- Publicity still with Jeff Richards
- Genre: Western
- Written by: E. Jack Neuman; Gene Roddenberry
- Directed by: Harmon Jones
- Starring: Jeff Richards; Eugene Mazzola; Cyril Delevanti; Robert J. Stevenson
- Country of origin: United States
- Original language: English
- No. of seasons: 2
- No. of episodes: 26

Production
- Executive producers: Mark Goodson; Bill Todman
- Running time: 25 mins. (approx)
- Production companies: Mark Goodson-Bill Todman Productions; Screen Gems

Original release
- Network: NBC
- Release: April 25 – December 11, 1958

Jefferson Drum, also known as The Pen and the Quill, is an American Western television series starring Jeff Richards that aired on the NBC network from April 25, 1958 to April 23, 1959.

== Overview ==
Jefferson Drum, portrayed by Jeff Richards, was a crusading newspaper editor in the Old West town of Jubilee. He and his son, Joey, traveled after Drum's wife was killed and his newspaper was destroyed. While they were in Jubilee the publisher of the newspaper there was killed. He took over the newspaper and settled there with his son. Although the focus of the series was on Drum's newspaper work, "... he was capable of using both revolver and fists when the need arose".

Joey was played by 10-year-old Eugene Mazzola, also known as Eugene Martin. Drum's printer is Lucius Coin, played by Cyril Delevanti. Big Ed, the town bartender, is portrayed by Robert J. Stevenson, later a member of the Los Angeles City Council. Hal J. Smith, later known for his role of the town drunk, Otis Campbell, on CBS's The Andy Griffith Show, was cast five times on Jefferson Drum as Hickey.

== Cast ==
- Jeff Richards .... Jefferson Drum
- Eugene Mazzola (billed as Eugene Martin) .... Joey Drum
- Cyril Delevanti .... Lucius Coin
- Robert J. Stevenson .... Big Ed

=== Guest stars ===
- R.G. Armstrong, as Kreiger in "Law and Order"; Jerry Hopper also appears in this episode.
- John Ashley, as Tim Keough in "Arrival", the series premiere
- Jim Bannon, Jean Byron, and Russell Johnson, as Tay Beloin, Angela, and The Sundown Kid, respectively, in "A Very Deadly Game"
- Gregg Barton, Virginia Gregg, and Harry Lauter appeared as Yance Meeker, Louise Hammond, and Vince Meeker, respectively, in "The Hanging of Joe Lavett".
- Dan Blocker, Lane Bradford, and Dan Sheridan appeared as Craig, Hank, and Leo in the segment entitled "Stagecoach Episode."
- Robert Bray and Charles Tannen, as Jack Page and Dandy Case, respectively, in the episode "Obituary"
- Andy Clyde played Hepburn in the episode "The Keeney Gang"; L.Q. Jones appeared in the same segment as Burdette.
- Mike Connors, as the title guest star in "Simon Pitt", the series finale. Ted de Corsia and Patrice Wymore appear in this episode as Jim Kind and Goldie, respectively.
- Abby Dalton, Ron Hagerthy, and Douglas Kennedy appeared as Eloise Barton, Will Barton, and Dallas, respectively, in the episode "Thicker than Water".
- Francis De Sales and Kenneth Tobey appeared as Bass Williard and John Wallach, respectively, in "$50 for a Dead Man."
- Andrew Duggan, Paul Sorensen, Rex Lease, and Philip Ahn appear as Charles McGowan, Benson, Tobin, and Charles Wong, respectively, in "The Cheater".
- Douglas Fowley, as Wooley in "Wheel of Fortune", with Richard Webb as Duane, and Jeanne Cooper as Phoebe West
- Bruce Gordon, as Juan Cavanaugh in "A Sad Day for a Tinhorn"
- James Griffith, Robert Vaughn, and Anna Karen as Troy Bendick, Shelly Poe, and Bess, respectively" in the episode "Return."
- Skip Homeier, as Kading in "The Post"
- Douglas Kennedy appeared as Dallas in "Thicker Than Water".
- John Larch, as John Larkin in "The Bounty Man"
- Gardner McKay, Paul Richards, Dennis Cross, and Irene Tedrow appeared as Simon Easton, Les Groves, Gideon Easton, and Mary Easton, respectively, in "Showdown".
- Anna Karen Morrow appeared as Bess in the episode "Return".
- Gregg Palmer and Rand Brooks appeared as Grant and as Ray Comstock, respectively, in "Band of Iron".
- Judson Pratt, Denver Pyle, and Charles Fredericks appeared as Father Andrew Damon, Bart Resdake, and Warden Johns, respectively, in "Prison Hill".
- William Schallert, as Polk Beauregard in "A Matter of Murder"
- Karen Steele, in the titular role of "Madame Faro", with Rick Vallin cast as Tanner
- Barbara Stuart appeared twice as Ellie in 1958 episodes "The Bounty Man" and "The Outlaw".
- Karl Swenson, as Kiley in "The Lawless"

== Episodes ==
In the episode entitled "Pete Henke" (November 20, 1958), the character Henke, portrayed by Strother Martin, is a violent sharpshooter known for causing trouble. Editor Jefferson Drum challenges Henke to a fistfight in the saloon, but Henke prevails in the third round when he throws something into Drum's eyes and blinds him temporarily. The saloon hostess who gave Henke the blinding substance is later seen at Henke's "medicine show." In the end, the persistent Drum knocks over Henke with a punch. "Pete Henke" also starred Frank Wolff as Sam Creighton and Bert Remsen as Jim Ford.

=== Season 1 ===
No. in season	Title	Original release date
1	"Arrival"	April 25, 1958
2	"The Bounty Man"	May 2, 1958
3	"Law and Order"	May 9, 1958
4	"A Bad Day For a Tinhorn"	May 16, 1958
5	"The Cheater"	May 23, 1958
6	"A Very Deadly Game"	May 30, 1958
7	"Madame Faro"	June 6, 1958
8	"Bandidos"	June 13, 1958
9	"The Outlaw"	June 20, 1958
10	"Wheel of Fortune"	June 27, 1958
11	"The Post"	July 4, 1958
12	"A Matter of Murder"	July 11, 1958
13	"The Lawless"	July 18, 1958
14	"The Hanging of Joe Lavett"	August 1, 1958

=== Season 2 ===
No. in season	Title	Original release date
1	"Showdown"	September 26, 1958
2	"The Keeney Gang"	October 3, 1958
3	"Stagecoach Episode"	October 10, 1958
4	"Obituary"	October 16, 1958
5	"Band of Iron"	October 23, 1958
6	"Return"	October 30, 1958
7	"The Captive"	November 6, 1958
8	"$50 For a Dead Man"	November 13, 1958
9	"Pete Henke"	November 20, 1958
10	"Thicker Than Water"	November 27, 1958
11	"Prison Hill"	December 4, 1958
12	"Simon Pitt"	December 11, 1958

== Production ==
Jefferson Drum was sponsored by Chemstrand and P. Lorillard Company. The series first aired at 7:30 Eastern on Friday opposite repeats of I Love Lucy on CBS and Leave It to Beaver on ABC. For its second round of episodes, it moved to Thursdays in the same 7:30 p.m. time slot. Rebroadcasts were aired during the first half of 1959. Jefferson Drum was produced for Screen Gems by Mark Goodson-Bill Todman Productions (known more for their game show output), and ran for parts of two seasons before it was cancelled. Episodes were black-and-white, with 26 broadcast.

== Critical response ==
A review of the premiere episode in The New York Times pointed out the show's emphasis on gunfights and violence. It said that Richards "stiffly played" his character and "The initial installment was routine."
