= A Day in Beaumont =

- The Twilight Zone episode
- Episode no.: Season 1 Episode 24a
- Directed by: Jeannot Szwarc
- Written by: David Gerrold
- Production code: 57
- Original air date: April 11, 1986

Guest appearances
- Victor Garber as Dr Kevin Carlson; Stacey Nelkin as Faith Carlson; Warren Stevens as Major Whitmore; Jeff Morrow as H.G. Orson; Kenneth Tobey as Sheriff Haskin; John Agar as Pop

Episode chronology
| ← Previous "Grace Note" | Next → "The Last Defender of Camelot" |

"A Day in Beaumont" is the first segment of the twenty-fourth episode of the first season of the television series The Twilight Zone. In this segment, a couple spends an entire day trying to convince the people of a small town that aliens have landed nearby.

== Plot ==
In 1955, Dr. Kevin Carlson and his girlfriend Faith are fixing their car in the desert outside the hamlet of Beaumont, when they spot a spacecraft crash behind a nearby hill. Investigating, Kevin and Faith find that the flying saucer is crewed by ant-headed aliens. Avoiding their laser beams, the couple drives to Beaumont to notify the authorities. The local sheriff says that the crash was an army jet but agrees to accompany them to the crash scene and check out their story. Military personnel are overseeing cleanup of the crash site, which is indeed a jet. The major in charge shakes hands by extending his pinky finger, which unsettles Kevin. A photographer takes pictures; his camera flash refracts with the illusion around the military personnel, briefly exposing them as the aliens Kevin and Faith saw earlier. Kevin and Faith withdraw and drive back to Beaumont.

Kevin and Faith try to convince local telegraphist H.G. Orson and Faith's uncle (who has a ham radio) to alert the press, but they realize that both of them have been replaced by aliens, due to the fact that they have their pinky fingers similarly extended. They then try to drive away. The aliens chase and capture them in a flying saucer. There, they explain that they are not on Earth at all; all of them, Kevin and Faith included, are aliens who are simulating an invasion scenario. Kevin and Faith had simply become so immersed in their roles that they forgot who they really were. Faith then removes her human mask, revealing that she has been "reprogrammed"; a horrified Kevin screams in agony as he too is forcibly reprogrammed.

Sometime later, another young man frantically runs inside Pops' Diner to warn the sheriff of a meteor he had seen crash down nearby. The camera then reveals that the sheriff is Kevin.

== Pop culture references ==
This segment serves as an homage to several science-fiction films and television shows, including the original Twilight Zone.

The name of the town is an homage to Charles Beaumont, writer of many of the original Twilight Zone episodes. There are also other references scattered throughout the episode, such as saying the meteor was near Willoughby, which is a reference to "A Stop at Willoughby", and near another town named Matheson, for Richard Matheson, the noted science fiction author and writer of over a dozen episodes of the original Twilight Zone.

The term "Bradbury rays" honors sci-fi author Ray Bradbury. As they depart their saucer, the aliens are carrying large seed pods, a reference to Invasion of the Body Snatchers. Additional references to the film are the character Uncle Ira and the Santa Mira mountains; "Santa Mira" was the name of the fictitious town from that film.

The setting, Altair IV, was named after the setting of Forbidden Planet. The "extended pinky fingers" of the aliens is a reference to the American cult television series The Invaders (1967–68), in which the invading aliens have the same trait.

The character H. G. Orson is a reference to H. G. Wells and Orson Welles. The character Sheriff Haskin may have also been named so as an homage to Byron Haskin, the director of the 1953 movie adaptation of The War of the Worlds of Wells' novel. All three of the diner characters (H. G. Orson, Sherriff Haskin, and Pops) were played by actors who had starred in multiple landmark sci-fi movies during the 1950s (Jeff Morrow, Kenneth Tobey, and John Agar, respectively). This was Morrow's final acting role. Faith Carlson is a reference to Faith Domergue, who co-starred with Jeff Morrow in This Island Earth. Kevin Carlson brings together Kevin McCarthy from Invasion of the Body Snatchers and Richard Carlson, most notably from It Came From Outer Space.

== Production ==
"A Day in Beaumont" was the last segment produced for season one of The Twilight Zone. Filming went on over schedule, and during shooting of the final scene the set became crowded with Twilight Zone cast and crew who had shown up for the season one wrap party.
