= Clay Campbell (make-up artist) =

American film makeup artist

- Born: May 21, 1901; Chicago, Illinois
- Died: June 1, 1989 (aged 88); Corona del Mar, California
- Occupation: Makeup artist
- Years active: 1932-1959

Clay Campbell (May 21, 1901 – June 1, 1989) was an American film makeup artist. known for his work in Hollywood during the mid-20th century. He was raised in Toronto, Canada, and after completing high school, he moved to Los Angeles, where he worked at a wax figure manufacturing company.

His company was contracted to create figures for the Warner Bros. film Mystery of the Wax Museum (1933), which brought him to the attention of Perc Westmore, head of Warner Bros.' makeup department. Westmore subsequently hired Campbell as his assistant.

Campbell later left Warner Bros. to join 20th Century-Fox, where he became head of the makeup department, and subsequently moved to Columbia Pictures, overseeing that studio’s makeup division. His work appeared in films such as Young Mr. Lincoln (1939), The Son of Dr. Jekyll (1951), and The Werewolf (1956). He retired in 1966. He is known as perhaps the only collector of lip imprints of famous female movie stars, amassing over 1,000 of them before his death in 1989. His collection includes lip imprints by actresses such as Marlene Dietrich, Donna Reed and Rita Hayworth.

== Select filmography ==
Gilda

- In a Lonely Place
- Born Yesterday (1950 film)
- Death of a Salesman (1951 film)
- The Big Heat
- From Here to Eternity
