= Jeff Morrow =

American actor (1907–1993)

- Morrow in 1973
- Born: Leslie Irving Morrow; January 13, 1907; New York City, U.S.
- Died: December 26, 1993 (aged 86); Canoga Park, California, U.S.
- Education: Pratt Institute
- Occupation: Actor
- Years active: 1927–1986
- Spouse: Anna Karen (m. 1947)
- Children: 1

Leslie Irving Morrow (January 13, 1907 – December 26, 1993), known as Jeff Morrow, was an American actor.

== Biography ==
Morrow was educated at Pratt Institute in his native New York City. He was a commercial artist prior to turning to acting.

=== Acting career ===
As early as 1927, aged 20, Morrow acted on stage as Irving Morrow. He appeared in such plays as Penal Law and Once in a Lifetime, as well as repertory in William Shakespeare's A Midsummer Night's Dream, Twelfth Night, Romeo and Juliet, and Macbeth.

After serving in the United States Army during World War II, Morrow spent the late 1940s on the stage and in radio, where he won the title role in the Dick Tracy radio series. He appeared in many Broadway productions, notably Three Wishes for Jamie, Billy Budd, the Maurice Evans production of Macbeth, and the Katharine Cornell production of Romeo and Juliet.

On October 17, 1950, he co-starred in "The Vanishing Lady" on the television drama The Trap.

Morrow turned to film acting relatively late in his career, commencing with the Biblical epic The Robe in 1953. Often parodied as the "Cro-Magnon Man" for his prominent brow, Morrow spent much of the 1950s appearing in a mix of A-budget films such as Flight to Tangier (1953) and Captain Lightfoot (1955), 'B' Westerns such as The First Texan (1956), and science fiction films as a leader and screen hero.

Morrow carried over much of his acting persona from his radio days to his film-acting roles, where his ability to rapidly alter both the tone and volume of his voice for dramatic effect frequently gave sound editors fits. He entered the science-fiction/monster movie genre with This Island Earth (1955), followed by The Creature Walks Among Us (1956), Kronos (1957), and The Giant Claw (1957).

He returned to television for most of his later roles, with six appearances on the religion anthology series Crossroads. In two episodes, he portrayed the Reverend M.R. Watkinson in "In God We Trust" and the Reverend Richard C. Smith in the series finale, "Half Mile Down" (both 1957). His other appearances were on such series as The Rifleman, Bonanza, Wagon Train, My Friend Flicka, The Deputy, and Daniel Boone. He was cast three times in guest-starring roles on Perry Mason as Franz Lachman in the 1962 episode The Case of the Ancient Romeo, as Alex Chase in the 1962 "The Case of the Dodging Domino", and as Lawton Brent in the 1965 episode "The Case of Festive Felon".

In 1957, Morrow was cast as Jim Bradford in the episode, "Blood in the Dust", on CBS's Dick Powell's Zane Grey Theatre. In the story line, Bradford would not back down when a gunman orders him to leave town. His wife Lucy (Claudette Colbert), is particularly distressed, because Jim has not shot a weapon since he was in the American Civil War.

In 1958–1959, he starred as Bart McClelland, the fictitious supervisor of construction of the Union Pacific Railroad in the syndicated half-hour Western series Union Pacific, based loosely on a film of the same name. In 1960, Morrow played Tob, the older brother of Boaz, in the biblical drama The Story of Ruth.

In 1960, he was cast as a geologist (astronaut) in The Twilight Zone episode "Elegy".

During the 1960s and onwards, Morrow appeared in such films as Harbor Lights (1963), the Italian comedy Il giovane normale (1969), Blood Legacy (1971), and in a bow to his earlier career, a role in the 1971 monster film Octaman for veteran 1950s monster movie writer/director Harry Essex.

After the 1974 cancellation of the sitcom The New Temperatures Rising, and completion of filming the low-budget film Fugitive Lovers, Morrow largely retired from acting, though he returned for a 1975 appearance in the series Police Story. His last television role was in 1986, with a guest appearance in The Twilight Zone episode "A Day in Beaumont".

== Personal life and death ==
At the time of his death, Morrow was married to Anna Karen and they had a daughter. He died on December 26, 1993, in Canoga Park, Los Angeles County, California.

== Partial filmography ==
- The Robe (1953) as Paulus
- Flight to Tangier (1953) as Colonel C. M. Wier
- Siege at Red River (1954) as Frank Kelso
- Tanganyika (1954) as Abel McCracken
- Sign of the Pagan (1954) as General Paulinus
- Captain Lightfoot (1955) as John Doherty aka Capt. Thunderbolt
- This Island Earth (1955) as Exeter
- World in My Corner (1956) as Robert T Mallison
- The Creature Walks Among Us (1956) as Dr. William Barton
- The First Texan (1956) as Jim Bowie
- Pardners (1956) as Rio
- Kronos (1957) as Dr. Leslie Gaskell
- Hour of Decision (1957) as Joe Sanders
- The Giant Claw (1957) as Mitch MacAfee
- Copper Sky (1957) as Haxon 'Hack' Williams
- The Story of Ruth (1960) as Tob
- Five Bold Women (1960) as Marshal Kirk Reed
- Harbor Lights (1963) as Cardinal
- Normal Young Man (1969) as Professor Sid
- Will to Die (1971) as Gregory Dean
- Octaman (1971) as Dr. John Willard
- Fugitive Lovers (1975) as Senator Maxim
