= Anna Karen Morrow =

American actress and model (1914–2009)

- Anna Karen Morrow in Dangerously Yours, 1944
- Born: September 20, 1914; New Jersey, U.S.
- Died: July 1, 2009 (aged 94); Woodland Hills, California, U.S.
- Occupations: Actress, model
- Years active: 1944–1978
- Spouse: Jeff Morrow (m. 1947; died 1993)
- Children: 1

Anna Karen Morrow (September 20, 1914 – July 1, 2009) was an American film and television actress and model.

== Career ==
Morrow was a model as a young woman. She appeared in such films as The Price of Fear (1956), The Wrong Man (1956), and It Happened in Athens (1962), and in the Broadway play Red Gloves. She sometimes acted in stage shows in Southern California.

Morrow appeared in such television series as Star Trek episode "All Our Yesterdays", Gunsmoke, Jefferson Drum, Wagon Train, The Farmer's Daughter, Hazel, and The Perry Como Show On the ABC prime-time soap opera Peyton Place, she appeared in nineteen episodes from 1965 to 1966 as Mrs. Chernak, the Harrington family housekeeper.

After she retired from acting, Morrow became a real estate agent, and did fundraising for the Muscular Dystrophy Association.

== Personal life ==
In 1947, she married actor Jeff Morrow, co-star of the syndicated Western television series Union Pacific, which aired from 1958 to 1959. He died in 1993. Morrow died in 2009 at the age of 94 in Woodland Hills, California, survived by her daughter, Lissa.

== Film ==
Year	Title	Role	Notes
1956	The Price of Fear	Mary	uncredited
1956	The Wrong Man	Miss Duffield	uncredited
1962	It Happened in Athens		
1971	The Ski Bum	Golda Lanning	

== Television ==
Year	Title	Role	Notes
1950, 1951	Lights Out	Alexis Dane	2 episodes
1958	Jefferson Drum	Bess	1 episode
1960	One Step Beyond	Nan Wylie	1 episode
1961	The Rebel	Bess Warren	1 episode
1962	Wagon Train	Hattie Maitland	1 episode
1963	The Farmer's Daughter	Arlene	1 episode
1964	Hazel	Marietta Horn	1 episode
1965-1966	Peyton Place	Anna Chernak	19 episodes
1966	Gunsmoke	Woman	1 episode
1967	Iron Horse	Amy Hobart, Mrs. Dolson	2 episodes
1969	Star Trek: The Original Series	Woman	S3:E23, "All Our Yesterdays"
1972, 1975	Marcus Welby, M.D.	Nurse Claire, Miss Carr	2 episodes
1978	Project U.F.O.	Clara	1 episode
