= The First Texan =

1956 film by Byron Haskin

- Theatrical release poster
- Directed by: Byron Haskin
- Written by: Daniel B. Ullman
- Produced by: Walter Mirisch
- Starring: Joel McCrea; Felicia Farr; Jeff Morrow
- Cinematography: Wilfred Cline
- Edited by: George White
- Music by: Roy Webb
- Production company: Walter Mirisch Productions
- Distributed by: Allied Artists
- Release date: June 29, 1956
- Running time: 82 minutes
- Country: United States
- Language: English
- Box office: $1 million

The First Texan is a 1956 American CinemaScope and Technicolor Western film directed by Byron Haskin and starring Joel McCrea, Felicia Farr and Jeff Morrow. Produced by Walter Mirisch, it was shot in CinemaScope and distributed by Allied Artists. It is set during the Texas Revolution of the 1830s.

== Plot ==
Sam Houston, a lawyer and former governor of Tennessee, travels to San Antonio, Texas to begin a new life. He encounters Jim Bowie, who is determined to free the territory from Mexico's rule.

Bowie is tried for treason. Houston represents him in court and successfully argues that the charge against Bowie must be dismissed because Mexico was not under martial law at the time.

Katherine Delaney comes into Houston's life. He still is married back home, but separated and dictates a letter requesting a formal divorce. Katherine will not become involved with Houston unless he changes into the man she wants him to be and not become actively involved in the fight to free Texas.

Davy Crockett relays a message from U.S. president Andrew Jackson, who wants Houston to lead the revolution. There are not enough troops at the Alamo to hold off General Antonio López de Santa Anna and the large Mexican army and the Alamo falls. Later. when Houston appears to be in full retreat, some of his men begin to feel he must be replaced.

It turns out Houston was planning a surprise attack. His forces are told to "remember the Alamo," and they proceed to overwhelm Santa Anna and his men in the Battle of San Jacinto. Texas is declared a free republic, and Sam Houston its first president, a movement that eventually will lead to statehood.

== Cast ==
- Joel McCrea as Sam Houston
- Felicia Farr as Katherine Delaney
- Jeff Morrow as Jim Bowie
- Wallace Ford as Henry Delaney
- Rodolfo Hoyos, Jr., as Colonel Martín Perfecto de Cos
- Abraham Sofaer as Don Carlos
- James Griffith as Davy Crockett
- William Hopper as William Barret Travis
- Dayton Lummis as Stephen F. Austin
- Roy Roberts as Col. Sam Sherman
- David Silva as General Antonio Lopez de Santa Anna
- Chubby Johnson as Deaf Smith
- Nelson Leigh as Colonel George Washington Hockley
- Myron Healey as Captain Martin

== Production ==
Finance came from Allied Artists. Walter Mirisch and Joel McCrea had just made Wichiga together. Filming started 14 October 1955.

== Reception ==
Walter Mirisch called the film "exceedingly successful" and it led to two more films with McCrea, The Oklahoman and The Tall Stranger. Byron Haskin however claimed that he was owed a deferred payment on the film and never received it. The director did say the movie was "well written" and "played well".

== See also ==
- List of American films of 1956
