= George Cisar (actor) =

American actor (1912–1979)

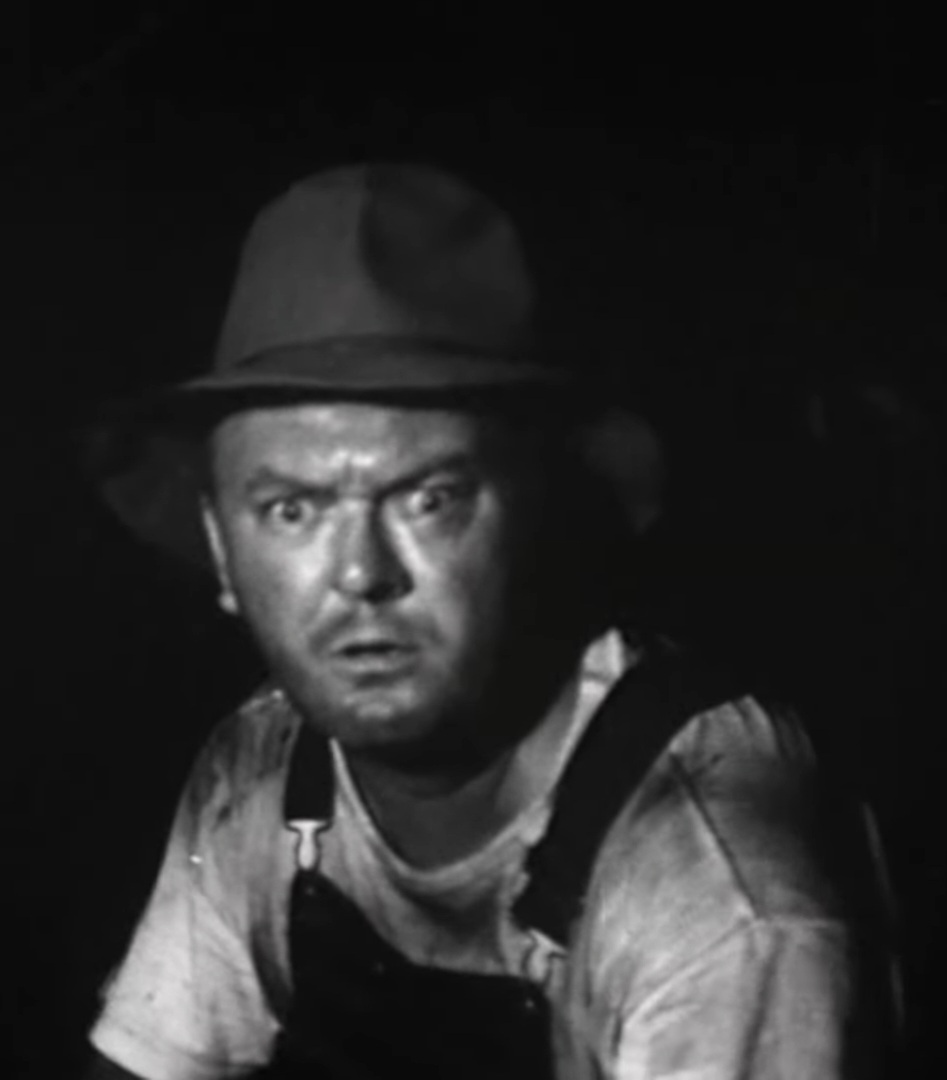
- Cisar in Attack of the Giant Leeches (1959)
- Born: July 28, 1912; Cicero, Illinois, U.S.
- Died: June 13, 1979 (aged 66); Los Angeles, California, U.S.
- Occupation: Actor
- Years active: 1948–1970

George Cisar (July 28, 1912 – June 13, 1979) was an American actor who performed in more than one hundred roles in two decades as a character actor in film and television, often in prominent Hollywood productions. He frequently played background parts such as policemen or bartenders.

== Career ==
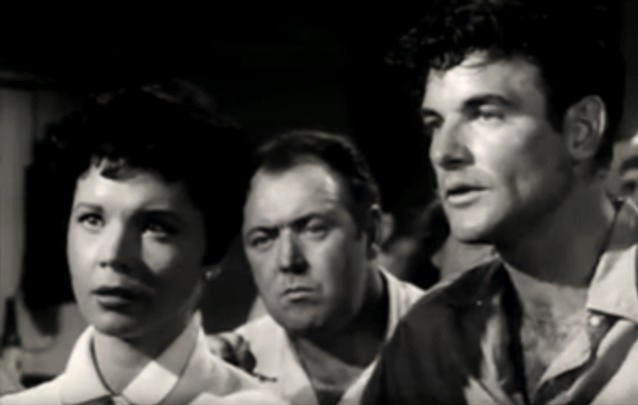
Colleen Miller, George Cisar and James Best in Hot Summer Night (1957)

In 1949, Cisar co-starred with a young Mike Wallace in the short-lived police drama Stand By for Crime. In 1957 he appeared on Highway Patrol as a car salesman.

Among Cisar's more frequent roles was from 1960 to 1963 as Sgt. Theodore Mooney in thirty-one episodes of CBS's Dennis the Menace. Series co-star Gale Gordon took the name "Theodore Mooney" and added the middle initial "J." for his character, Theodore J. Mooney, a tough-minded banker on Lucille Ball's second sitcom, The Lucy Show. Cisar also appeared as the postman in a 1962 episode of Leave It to Beaver (S6E9 - "Beaver Joins a Record Club").

Cisar appeared in a 1965 episode of The Cara Williams Show with Cara Williams and portrayed character Donald Hollinger's father in That Girl, the Marlo Thomas sitcom which aired on ABC, and Cyrus Tankersley on CBS's The Andy Griffith Show and its sequel Mayberry, R.F.D.

Unbilled in his first film, 1948's Call Northside 777, he was credited at the bottom of the cast list in his next feature, 1949's Johnny Holiday. His final film appearance, also near the end of the list, was as Joe the barber in the 1970 Southern racial drama, ...tick...tick...tick....

Nine years later, Cisar died in Los Angeles, at the age of 66.

== Selected filmography ==
- Call Northside 777 (1948) - Policeman (uncredited)
- Batman and Robin (1949, Serial) - Policeman in Alley [Ch. 1] (uncredited)
- Johnny Holiday (1949) - Barney Duggan
- Cell 2455 Death Row (1955) - Captain (uncredited)
- 5 Against the House (1955) - Casino Guard (uncredited)
- Teen-Age Crime Wave (1955) - Fred - Man at Bar (uncredited)
- The Crooked Web (1955) - Don Gillen (uncredited)
- Inside Detroit (1956) - Druggist (uncredited)
- The Harder They Fall (1956) - Fight Manager (uncredited)
- Over-Exposed (1956) - Club Customer Photographed by Lila (uncredited)
- Somebody Up There Likes Me (1956) - Fence (uncredited)
- The Werewolf (1956) - Hoxie
- Scandal Incorporated (1956) - Willie Anderson
- The Opposite Sex (1956) - Orchestra Leader (uncredited)
- Emergency Hospital (1956) - Mr. Fanmorn (uncredited)
- Scandal Incorporated (1956) - Bus Driver (uncredited)
- The Great American Pastime (1956) - Bailiff (uncredited)
- Don't Knock the Rock (1956) - Influential Citizen Tom Everett
- Hot Summer Night (1957) - Manager (uncredited)
- The Shadow on the Window (1957) - Proprietor (uncredited)
- Designing Woman (1957) - Fred Seixas, Card Playing Crony (uncredited)
- The Giant Claw (1957) - Admonishing Man on Airliner (uncredited)
- The Abductors (1957) - Officers of the Law
- The Buckskin Lady (1957) - Cranston
- Man on Fire (1957) - Bailiff (uncredited)
- Chicago Confidential (1957) - Manager of the Green Dragon Nightclub (uncredited)
- My Gun Is Quick (1957) - Customs Inspector (uncredited)
- The Brothers Rico (1957) - Pete Selsun - Dude Cowboy (uncredited)
- Jailhouse Rock (1957) - Jake - Bartender (uncredited)
- The World Was His Jury (1958) - Afterdeck Bos'n (uncredited)
- Jet Attack (1958) - Col. Catlett
- Teacher's Pet (1958) - Bongo Club Patron (uncredited)
- The Party Crashers (1958) - Willy (uncredited)
- Some Came Running (1958) - Hubie Nelson (uncredited)
- Andy Hardy Comes Home (1958) - Bailiff (uncredited)
- I Mobster (1959) - Cab Driver (uncredited)
- The Big Circus (1959) - Bill - Reporter (uncredited)
- Attack of the Giant Leeches (1959) - Lem Sawyer
- Edge of Eternity (1959) - Dealer (uncredited)
- Vice Raid (1959) - Marty Heffner
- Bat Masterson (1959) - Sheriff
- All the Fine Young Cannibals (1960) - Cop (uncredited)
- Elmer Gantry (1960) - Salesman in Saloon (uncredited)
- One Foot in Hell (1960) - Barfly (uncredited)
- The George Raft Story (1961) - Markham (uncredited)
- Terror at Black Falls (1962) - Crowley - Bartender
- Married Too Young (1962) - Miltie
- It Happened at the World's Fair (1963) - Craps Shooter (uncredited)
- Johnny Cool (1963) - George - Bartender (uncredited)
- My Favorite Martian (1963, TV Series) - Patrolman #1 / Policeman
- Viva Las Vegas (1964) - Manager of Swingers (uncredited)
- 7 Faces of Dr. Lao (1964) - Drunken Townsman (uncredited)
- A House Is Not a Home (1964) - Dr. Saunders
- The Candidate (1964) - Senator Tully
- Girl Happy (1965) - Bartender at the Kit Kat Club (uncredited)
- A Very Special Favor (1965) - Conventioneer at Hotel (uncredited)
- Made in Paris (1966) - Barney - Bartender (uncredited)
- Billy the Kid Versus Dracula (1966) - Joe Flake
- The Glass Bottom Boat (1966) - Fat Man (uncredited)
- Batman (1966) - rumpot in window (uncredited)
- The Addams Family (1966, TV Series) - Montrose, Ophelia's boyfriend
- Eight on the Lam (1967) - Arthur, at Laundromat (uncredited)
- The Monkees (1967) – Reporter #1 in S1:E20, "Monkees in the Ring"
- Speedway (1968) - Portly Bald-Headed Man (uncredited)
- The Split (1968) - Charlie - Hotel Doorman (uncredited)
- Skidoo (1968) - Charlie - Crime Committee Witness (uncredited)
- My Dog, the Thief (1969) - Herman
- The Wacky Zoo of Morgan City (1970) - Party Guest
- Tick, Tick, Tick (1970) - Barber (final film role)
