= Creature with the Atom Brain (film) =

1955 film by Edward L. Cahn

- Theatrical release poster
- Directed by: Edward L. Cahn
- Screenplay by: Curt Siodmak
- Story by: Curt Siodmak
- Starring: Richard Denning
- Cinematography: Fred Jackman Jr.
- Edited by: Aaron Stell
- Color process: Black and white
- Production company: Clover Productions
- Distributed by: Columbia Pictures
- Release date: July 1955
- Running time: 69 minutes
- Country: United States
- Language: English

Creature with the Atom Brain is a 1955 American zombie horror film directed by Edward L. Cahn and starring Richard Denning.

American gangster Frank Buchanan (Michael Granger) forces German scientist Wilhelm Steigg to create zombies by resurrecting corpses through atomic radiation in order to exact revenge on his enemies.

Creature with the Atom Brain was released by Columbia Pictures in July 1955 on a double feature with It Came from Beneath the Sea (1955).

== Plot ==
A hulking zombie breaks into a mansion and kills a gangster named Hennesy. The glowing bloodstains left behind at the crime scene are radioactive, as are the killer's fingerprints – which are of a man who had died days before. The police are baffled, but begin their investigation.

They soon discover that the connection between Hennesy and subsequent murders is Frank Buchanan, a former crime boss who had been deported to Europe. While there, Buchanan funded the research of German scientist Wilhelm Steigg to reanimate the dead. Having returned (with Steigg still beholden to him for funding) to the States, Buchanan seeks revenge on all who had sent him to prison in the first place.

The zombies, although they move fairly slowly, obey their radioed commands explicitly. They have no initiative, but can readily navigate the city and perform fairly complex tasks. They can drive, speak on behalf of Buchanan (including over the phone), are impervious to bullets, including those fired at point-blank range, and can bend steel bars and tear off steering wheels with ease. They also all have large scars visible on their foreheads from their brain surgery.

Following the fantastic yet irrefutable clues under the leadership of Chet Walker, both police and army troops eventually converge on Buchanan's mansion. Buchanan summarily kills Steigg and sends out a horde of zombies to battle them. Walker smashes the atomic-powered equipment which controls them, whereupon they all collapse, again inanimate corpses.

== Cast ==
- Richard Denning as Dr. Chet Walker
- Angela Stevens as Joyce Walker
- S. John Launer as Capt. Dave Harris
- Michael Granger as Frank Buchanan
- Gregory Gaye as Dr. Wilhelm Steigg (as Gregory Gay)
- Linda Bennett as Penny Walker
- Tristram Coffin as District Atty. McGraw
- Harry Lauter as Reporter #1
- Larry J. Blake as Reporter #2 (as Larry Blake)
- Charles Evans as Chief Camden
- Pierre Watkin as Mayor Bremer
- Lane Chandler as Gen. Saunders (uncredited)

== Production ==
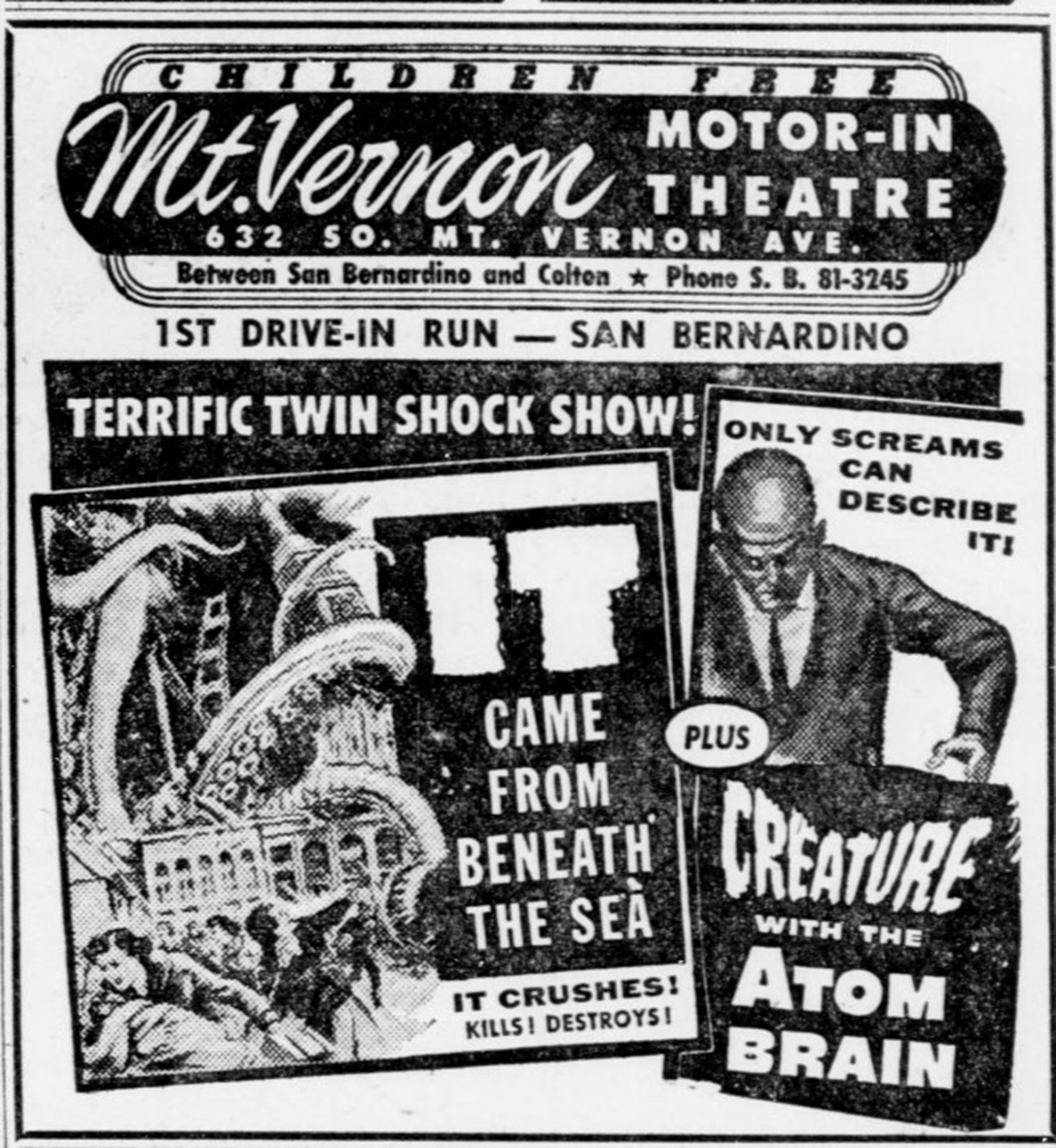
Ad for the film

Original Trailer

The film was made by Sam Katzman's Clover Productions for Columbia Pictures Corp. Later analysis has suggested that the film Donovan's Brain provided influence on this one.

== Reception ==
The Williamson Daily News noted in January, 1956 that the film had "chills and suspense". One local educational group of teachers found that the film was a "grotesque distortion of scientific facts" that would "create fear and confusion in the minds of children".

In The Zombie Movie Encyclopedia, academic Peter Dendle wrote, "Good '50s fun abounds, with all the twisted gender ideology and antiseptic social ideals that that implies, packed in a tightly-wrought action film with strong (if entertainingly dated) conceptual support". David Maine of PopMatters rated it 6 out of 10 stars and called it "a thoroughly enjoyable, noir-ish SF chiller, if you can get past the dingbat wife and cutie-pie kid".

Psychiatrist, Sharon Packer, notes that the film draws influence from 1919's The Cabinet of Dr. Caligari for its "idea of creating mindless surrogates".

== Home media ==
Sony Pictures Home Entertainment released the film on Region 1 DVD in October 2007 as part of the two-disc, four-film set, Icons of Horror Collection: Sam Katzman, which also included these Katzman-produced films: The Werewolf, The Giant Claw, and Zombies of Mora Tau. These films were later released in high definition by Arrow Video in 2021 as part of the Cold War Creatures set.

== Influence ==
Roky Erickson and the Aliens, a band whose lyrics often riffed on old horror and science fiction movies, recorded a song titled "Creature with the Atom Brain" in 1980. This song, in turn, became the namesake of the Belgian rock band Creature with the Atom Brain. In addition, The Celibate Rifles released a song titled "Return of the Creature with the Atom Brain".

Director Cahn would go on to make Invisible Invaders (1959) using the same basic concept (invading aliens inhabit the reanimated corpses of humans).

== See also ==
- List of American films of 1955
