= The Werewolf (1956 film) =

1956 film by Fred F. Sears

- Theatrical release poster
- Directed by: Fred F. Sears
- Screenplay by: Robert E. Kent; James B. Gordon
- Story by: Robert E. Kent; James B. Gordon
- Produced by: Sam Katzman
- Starring: Don Megowan; Joyce Holden
- Cinematography: Edward Linden
- Edited by: Harold White
- Color process: Black and white
- Production company: Sam Katzman Productions
- Distributed by: Columbia Pictures
- Release date: July 1956
- Running time: 80 minutes
- Country: United States
- Language: English

The Werewolf is a 1956 American horror science fiction film directed by Fred F. Sears and starring Don Megowan and Joyce Holden.

Set in contemporary times (i.e. the 1950s), the storyline follows an amnesiac man who, after being injected with "irradiated wolf serum" by unscrupulous doctors, transforms into a werewolf when under emotional stress. The film "marks precisely the point in which horror, which had been a dormant genre in the early '50s, began to take over from science fiction", and is the first of only three werewolf films made in the US during that decade, preceding Daughter of Dr. Jekyll and I Was a Teenage Werewolf (both 1957). The Werewolf was released theatrically in the US as the bottom half of a double feature with Earth vs. the Flying Saucers (1956).

== Plot ==
A disheveled man in a suit wanders down the main street of the small, rural town of Mountaincrest on a winter's night. He goes into a bar, telling the bartender that he does not know who or where he is. Local thug Joe Mitchell demands his money as he leaves. As the two men struggle in an alleyway, Ma Everett sees only four legs sticking out onto the sidewalk but hears an animal snarling. Two of the legs go limp. Someone- or something- steps out of the alley. She screams, and it runs off into the darkness.

Sheriff Jack Haines takes Joe's body to Dr. Jonas Gilchrist and nurse Amy Standish. Gilchrist notes that the wounds seem inflicted by a wild animal, but Ma described not an animal but "a thing." Jack organizes a posse to find the creature.

Jack brings Deputy Ben Clovey to Gilchrist's office. Ben has been attacked by "the thing." He describes it haltingly to Jack: "Maybe it had hands covered with hair... or maybe it had paws like a wolf... but it wasn't all wolf... I didn't have much time to see." Jack declares that a werewolf attacked Ben. Gilchrist and Amy conclude that Jack is correct.

The disheveled man arrives at Gilchrist's office. After an automobile accident, he can recall being to two doctors- he does not know who or where they are. He is tormented by what is happening to him. He says he killed Joe, then flees when Amy attempts to give him a sedative, exclaiming, "Those other doctors did something to me!" Amy phones the sheriff.

Doctors Morgan Chambers and Emery Forrest discuss the man they had treated after his car crash. They had injected him with "irradiated wolf serum", never before used on humans. The doctors believe that once perfected, the serum will allow "a select minority of people" — chosen by them — to survive the imminent nuclear holocaust. Lycanthropy is an unfortunate side effect. The amnesiac man's wife, Helen Marsh, and their preteen son Chris show up and identify the man as Duncan Marsh. The doctors head to Mountaincrest, hoping to avoid blame by killing Duncan.

Forrest corners Duncan in a mineshaft. Duncan pleads for his life before suddenly transforming into the werewolf. He attacks Forrest but is driven off by shots fired by Chambers.

Amy convinces Jack to try to take Duncan alive and volunteers to help with first aid. Jack reluctantly agrees to allow Helen and Chris to come also and they, accompanied by Ben, set out.

Helen calls Duncan with Jack's megaphone. In human form, Duncan comes and tearfully embraces Helen and Chris, but tells Amy to take them away as he fears he might turn into a werewolf again and harm them.

Duncan is put in a jail cell. Chambers and Forrest force their way into the jail and try to inject Duncan with something deadly. Duncan changes into the werewolf, kills them and again escapes into the woods.

The werewolf, on a bridge, attempts to flee but is shot dead by the posse. As the werewolf dies, it reverts to Duncan's human form.

== Cast ==
- Don Megowan as Sheriff Jack Haines
- Joyce Holden as Amy Standish
- Eleanore Tanin as Mrs. Helen Marsh
- Kim Charney as Chris Marsh
- Harry Lauter as Deputy Ben Clovey
- Larry J. Blake as Hank Durgis
- Ken Christy as Dr. Jonas Gilchrist
- James Gavin as Mack Fanning
- S. John Launer as Dr. Emery Forrest
- George Lynn as Dr. Morgan Chambers
- George Cisar as Hoxie
- Steven Ritch as Duncan Marsh/The Werewolf

== Production ==
The film was shot on location in the San Bernardino National Forest in California. Although most modern sources agree that Mountaincrest is actually the town of Big Bear Lake, located on Big Bear Lake itself, film historian John Johnson places the location as Fawnskin, also on Big Bear Lake.

Viewing the film reveals that the film was shot in many locations around the lake. There are numerous scenes shot on the south shore with Bertha Peak in the background. All of the "town" locations are in Big Bear Village, and most notably those at the old Chad's, which was a bar on Village Drive in the location of today's Whiskey Dave's, though it was much smaller in 1955 than today's establishment. The old Bear Valley Realty office and the Rexall Drug store are clearly visible in the town scenes. The scenes around the dam (Eastwood Dam) include the road (since removed) over the dam, the dam itself and the original granite dam (Brown Dam) that today is usually underwater. Many of the roadblock scenes were shot on today's Highway 38 on the north shore between the dam and West Boat Launch, with the large home in the background of some shots, still standing.

According to the American Film Institute, filming took place between December 10 and 20, 1955. Although the on-screen credits read "introducing Steven Ritch", according to AFI, he had appeared in "several films" before The Werewolf.

== Reception ==
Variety wrote that the film "seldom rises above a plodding monotone and won't create much reaction in the minor program market for which it is headed". The Monthly Film Bulletin had a more favorable opinion, saying that "the film in general and the performance of Steven Ritch in particular are slightly superior to previous efforts in this genre, and the photography in the 'transformation' close-ups is reasonably convincing". Harrison's Reports wrote, "The picture offers little that is original, either in story or in treatment, but it may prove acceptable to the horror fans since it is the first 'wolfman' type of film to reach the screen in years".

== Release ==
In the US, The Werewolf premiered in Los Angeles on June 13, 1956 and went into general release in July as the second feature on a double bill with Earth vs the Flying Saucers. It was the first feature on a UK double bill with Creature with the Atom Brain. The film was given an X-certificate by the British Board of Film Censors, clearing it for distribution in the UK but prohibiting it from being exhibited to persons under age 16. After opening in UK theaters in August 1956, it was released in the Netherlands in 1957 and Argentina in 1958, then at unspecified dates in France, Brazil, Mexico, Australia, Finland, the Soviet Union, Spain, Portugal and Italy. Columbia Pictures distributed the film theatrically in the US, UK and the Netherlands.

Excerpts from the film were featured in the 1991 documentary Wolfman Chronicles, as well as in the 2010 documentary Video Nasties: Moral Panic, Censorship & Videotape. The Werewolf also inspired the 2015 short film Wolf Mother: Hunted.

== Home media ==
Sony Pictures Home Entertainment released the film on DVD in October 2007 as part of the two-disc, four-film set Icons of Horror Collection: Sam Katzman, along with three other films produced by Katzman (Creature with the Atom Brain, The Giant Claw and Zombies of Mora Tau).

== See also ==
- List of American films of 1956
