= Creature with the Atom Brain (band) =

Belgian alternative rock band

- Origin: Antwerp, Belgium
- Genres: Alternative rock, Indie rock, psychedelic rock, experimental rock
- Years active: 2004-present
- Labels: Jezus Factory Records; Conspiracy records Munich Records
- Members: Aldo Struyf; Jean-Philippe De Gheest; Jan Wygers; Michiel Van Cleuvenbergen
- Past members: Dave Schroyen
- Website: http://www.creaturewiththeatombrain.be/

Creature with the Atom Brain is a Belgian alternative rock band consisting of Millionaire keyboardist Aldo Struyf (Guitar/Keys/Vocals), Dave Schroyen (Drums), Jan Wygers (Bass) and Michiel Van Cleuvenbergen (Guitar). The band have been said to make "fuzzy stripped-back rock'n'roll noise with a generous helping of weird." The band's name is taken from the Roky Erickson & The Aliens song (Which in turn was taken from the 1955 film of the same name), with Struyf citing Erickson's former band The 13th Floor Elevators and the man himself as influencing Creature with the Atom Brain's sound.

After two 12" EPs on Conspiracy records, the band released their first full-length album on 24 March 2008, entitled I am the Golden Gate Bridge. The album notably featured guest vocals from fellow Millionaire band-member Tim Vanhamel and Mark Lanegan, Struyf having provided keyboards and toured for the latter's Bubblegum album. Creature with the Atom Brain have since toured in support of the album, including playing cancelled shows for Masters of Reality and supporting Jesus and Mary Chain on selected shows.

== Discography ==
=== EPs ===
- The Snake (2005)
- Kill the Snake (2006)

=== Albums ===
- I Am The Golden Gate Bridge (2008)
- Transylvania (2009)
- The Birds Fly Low (2012)
- Night Of The Hunter (2015)
