= Justin O'Brien (scholar) =

American French professor 1906–1968

Justin O'Brien (November 26, 1906 – December 7, 1968) was an American biographer, translator of André Gide and Albert Camus and professor of French at Columbia University.

== Biography ==
Justin McCortney O'Brien was born on November 26, 1906, in Chicago, Illinois, to Quin O'Brien and Ellen, née McCortney.

He was a biographer of André Gide, and a translator of Gide, Camus and Sartre. He was also a reviewer, and a professor of French at Columbia University. He was an enthusiast of Proust, Camus and Gide, and was able to transmit his enthusiasm to Americans, contributing to make these and other French authors known in the United States. Among the works of Camus translated by O'Brien are Caligula, The Fall, as well as The Myth of Sisyphus and other essays and Exile and the Kingdom. He was the translator of Gide's journals, translating and editing Journals, 1889–1949. Among his other translations of Gide is So Be It Or the Chips Are Down. In 1953 he published his critical biography on André Gide, Portrait of André Gide.

He was awarded the Guggenheim Fellowship in French Literature in 1942. He died on December 7, 1968, aged 62.

== Selected works ==
=== Author ===
- Portrait of André Gide: A Critical Biography (New York: Alfred A. Knopf, 1953)
- Les nourritures d'André Gide et les Bucoliques de Virgile, translated into French by E. van Rysselberghe, (Boulogne-Billancourt: Editions de la Revue Pretexte, 1953).
- The French literary horizon (New Brunswick: Rutgers University Press, 1967)
- Contemporary French Literature: Essays (New Brunswick: Rutgers University Press, 1971)

=== Translator ===
- Gide, André. The Journals of André Gide 1889-1949, four volumes, (New York: Alfred A. Knopf and London: Secker & Warburg, 1947–1951)
- Gide, André. Madeleine (New York: Alfred A. Knopf, 1952)
- Gide, André. Logbook of the Coiners (London: Cassell, 1952)
- Camus, Albert. The Myth of Sisyphus (London: Hamish Hamilton, 1955)
- Camus, Albert. The Fall (London: Hamish Hamilton, 1957)
- Camus, Albert. Exile and the Kingdom (London: Hamish Hamilton, 1958)
- Gide, André. So Be It Or the Chips Are Down (New York: Alfred A. Knopf, 1959)
- Camus, Albert. The Possessed (London: Hamish Hamilton, 1960)
- Camus, Albert. Resistance, Rebellion, and Death (New York: Alfred A. Knopf, 1961)
- Camus, Albert. Caligula: Adapted from the French by Justin O'Brien (New York: Samuel French, 1961)
- Camus, Albert. Notebooks 1942–1951 (New York: Alfred A. Knopf, 1965)
- Camus, Albert. Create Dangerously (London: Penguin, 2020)
- Camus, Albert. Committed Writings (London: Penguin, 2020)
- Camus, Albert. Reflections on the Guillotine (London: Penguin, 2020)
