= Feet of clay =

Character flaw or weakness

Feet of clay is an idiom that refers to a weakness or character flaw, especially in people of prominence and power. It can also be used to refer to larger groups, such as societies, businesses, and empires. An entity with feet of clay may appear powerful and unstoppable, but they cannot support their splendor, and will easily be knocked over.

The phrase originates from the Book of Daniel in the Bible. In it, Daniel interprets a dream of King Nebuchadnezzar of Babylon. In that dream, a magnificent statue is seen with a head of gold, but weaker and less valuable metals beneath, until finally having feet of clay mixed with iron. Daniel predicts that the glorious statue shall be smashed by a stone into pieces, like chaff on the threshing floor, and blown to the winds. The image of the expensive statue laid low has resonated as an analogy for seemingly powerful figures with substantial weaknesses.

== Origin ==
The origin of the analogy is in Daniel 2, verses 31–45, where the prophet Daniel interprets the king's dream:

You were looking, O king, and lo! there was a great statue. This statue was huge, its brilliance extraordinary; it was standing before you, and its appearance was frightening. The head of that statue was of fine gold, its chest and arms of silver, its middle and thighs of bronze, its legs of iron, its feet partly of iron and partly of clay. As you looked on, a stone was cut out, not by human hands, and it struck the statue on its feet of iron and clay and broke them in pieces. Then the iron, the clay, the bronze, the silver, and the gold, were all broken in pieces and became like the chaff of the summer threshing floors; and the wind carried them away, so that not a trace of them could be found. But the stone that struck the statue became a great mountain and filled the whole earth.

This was the dream; now we will tell the king its interpretation. You, O king, the king of kings—to whom the God of heaven has given the kingdom, the power, the might, and the glory, into whose hand he has given human beings, wherever they live, the wild animals of the field, and the birds of the air, and whom he has established as ruler over them all—you are the head of gold. After you shall arise another kingdom inferior to yours, and yet a third kingdom of bronze, which shall rule over the whole earth. And there shall be a fourth kingdom, strong as iron; just as iron crushes and smashes everything, it shall crush and shatter all these. As you saw the feet and toes partly of potter's clay and partly of iron, it shall be a divided kingdom; but some of the strength of iron shall be in it, as you saw the iron mixed with the clay. As the toes of the feet were part iron and part clay, so the kingdom shall be partly strong and partly brittle. As you saw the iron mixed with clay, so will they mix with one another in marriage, but they will not hold together, just as iron does not mix with clay. And in the days of those kings the God of heaven will set up a kingdom that shall never be destroyed, nor shall this kingdom be left to another people. It shall crush all these kingdoms and bring them to an end, and it shall stand forever; just as you saw that a stone was cut from the mountain not by hands, and that it crushed the iron, the bronze, the clay, the silver, and the gold. The great God has informed the king what shall be hereafter. The dream is certain, and its interpretation trustworthy.

— Daniel 2:31-45 (New Revised Standard Version)

=== Historical context ===
The Book of Daniel is generally agreed to be written around 165 BC during the reign of Antiochus IV Epiphanes, who reigned as King of the Seleucid Empire from 175–164 BC. Under Antiochus IV, fierce persecution of Judaism began in Judea around 168 BCE. This persecution led both to passive resistance as well as eventually an armed military resistance movement, the Maccabean Revolt. The author of the Book of Daniel wanted to reassure readers that the end of Antiochus IV's tyranny had been foreseen by the prophet Daniel 400 years ago. To that end, the book includes vaticinia ex eventu, that is, "prophecies" of events that had already happened in the past for the author. The generally accepted interpretation of the statue dream is that it predicts the history of the Middle East up until the time of writing. The golden empire is the Babylonians (as is clear from the setting of Daniel); the second empire of silver is the Medes; the bronze empire is the Persian Empire; and the fourth iron empire is the Macedonian empire of Alexander the Great. The final empire of clay mixed with iron are the diadochi successor states, such as the Seleucid Empire that then ruled Judea. These successor states had Greek military settlements with an imported Greek elite, but generally did not over mix with the locals, and were clearly not believed to be as strong as the Greek empire of Alexander's day, which was pure iron. The actual prediction being made, then, is the fate of the fifth empire of the Seleucids: that it will be smashed by a stone "not cut from human hands", that is, by the work of God.

== Notable uses ==
In Canto XIV of Dante's Inferno, his guide, the Roman poet Virgil, tells of the Old Man of Crete. It is a giant statue in a cave under Mount Ida on the island of Crete, which closely resembles the one in Nebuchadnezzar's dream. It differs in that every part except the gold is cracked, and exudes tears which seep into the ground and are the source of the rivers of Hell.

The phrase is found in Byron's poem, "Ode to Napoleon Buonaparte":

Thanks for that lesson—it will teach
To after-warriors more
Than high Philosophy can preach,
And vainly preach'd before.
That spell upon the minds of men
Breaks never to unite again,
That led them to adore
Those Pagod things of sabre sway,
With fronts of brass, and feet of clay.

In the ABBA song "Happy New Year", written by Björn Ulvaeus and Benny Andersson, man is said to have feet of clay:

Oh yes, man is a fool
And he thinks he'll be okay
Dragging on, feet of clay
Never knowing he's astray
Keeps on going anyway

In the German philosopher Friedrich Nietzsche's posthumously published autobiography Ecce Homo:

The last thing I should promise would be to "improve" mankind. No new idols are erected by me; let the old ones learn what feet of clay mean.

In the French philosopher Albert Camus' 1938 lyrical essay The Desert in the collection Nuptials:

In this great temple deserted by the gods, all my idols have feet of clay.

The phrase is referenced in the title of Earl Sweatshirt's 2019 EP Feet of Clay.

Terry Pratchett’s 1996 novel Feet of Clay is both a reference to this, and its subject matter, golems made of clay.

== See also ==
- Paper tiger
- Achilles' heel
- Hubris
- Ozymandias
