= David Oelhoffen =

French film director and screenwriter (born 1968)

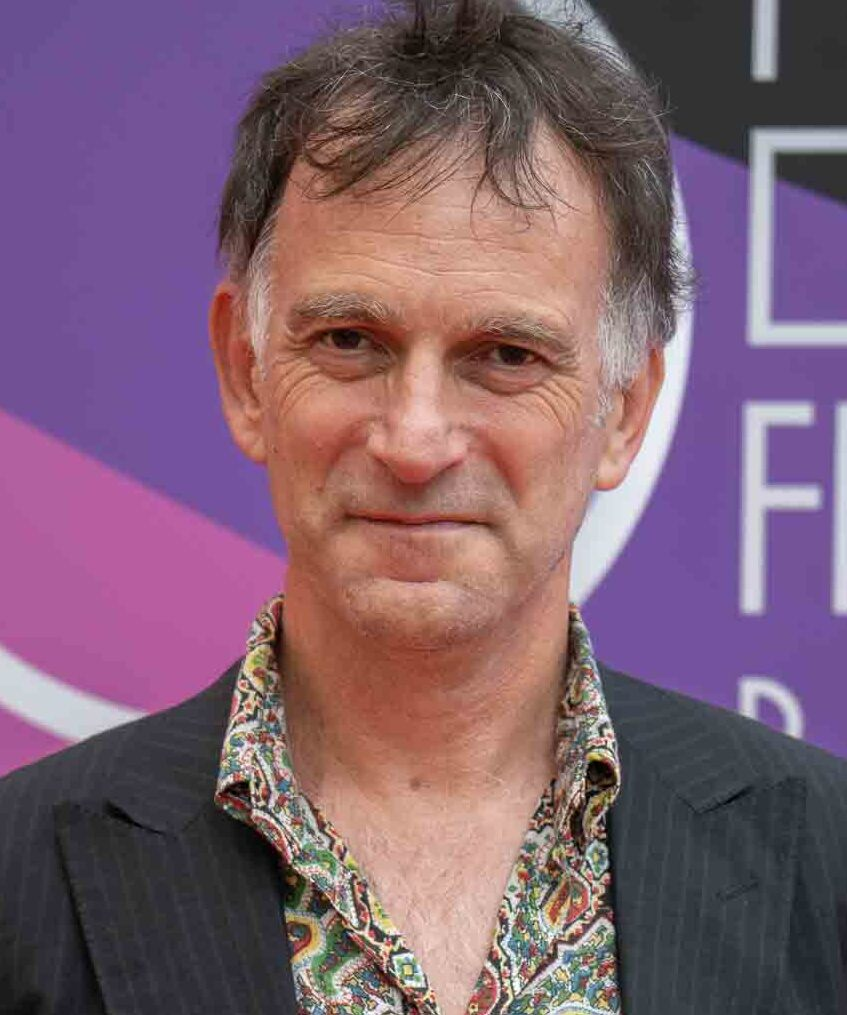
- Oelhoffen in 2024
- Born: 1968 (age 56–57)
- Occupation(s): Film director, screenwriter
- Years active: 1996–present

David Oelhoffen (born 1968) is a French film director and screenwriter. His debut feature In Your Wake premiered in the International Critics' Week of the 2007 Cannes Film Festival. His next film was Far from Men from 2014, which is based on the short story The Guest by Albert Camus and stars Viggo Mortensen and Reda Kateb. It played in competition at the 71st Venice International Film Festival where it won three awards.

== Filmography ==
- Le Mur (1996) – short film
- Big Bang (1997) – short film
- En mon absence (2001) – featurette
- Sous le bleu (2004) – short film
- In Your Wake (Nos retrouvailles) (2007)
- Far from Men (Loin des hommes) (2014)
- In the Forests of Siberia (Dans les forêts de Sibérie) (2016)
- Close Enemies (2018)
- The Fourth Wall (Le Quatrième Mur) (2024)
