= Réflexions sur la peine capitale =

Book by Albert Camus

- Author: Albert Camus and Arthur Koestler
- Language: French
- Publisher: Calmann-Lévy
- Publication date: 1957
- Publication place: France
- Pages: 245

Réflexions sur la peine capitale is an essay on the death penalty written before its abolition in France. It was co-signed by two writers, Albert Camus and Arthur Kœstler. The essay delves into the human condition from an existentialist perspective.

== Contents ==
The book composed of three parts:

- "Réflexions sur la potence" by Arthur Koestler, translated from the English "Reflections on Hanging"
- "Réflexions sur la guillotine" by Albert Camus
- "La Peine de mort en France", an introduction by Jean Bloch-Michel
