= Noces =

Noces may refer to:

- Nuptials (essays), a collection by Albert Camus
- A Wedding (2016 film), directed by Stephan Streker
