= Notebooks 1951–1959 =

Notebooks 1951–1959 is the third volume of Albert Camus' notes. Two more volumes of Camus' notes were also published (Notebooks 1935–1942 and Notebooks 1942–1951). This book shed light on Camus' thought related to his continual rivalry with Jean-Paul Sartre and a large part of the left, after his book The Rebel (L’Homme révolté) was published. Camus' despair is evident: "I await with patience a catastrophe that is slow in coming". His thoughts on Nobel prize are also depicted: "Nobel. Strange feeling of overwhelming pressure and melancholy. At 20 years old, poor and naked, I knew true glory. My mother."
