= Far from Men =

2014 film

- Film poster
- French: Loin des hommes
- Directed by: David Oelhoffen
- Screenplay by: David Oelhoffen
- Based on: "The Guest" (1957 story) by Albert Camus
- Produced by: Marc Du Pontavice; Matthew Gledhill
- Starring: Viggo Mortensen; Reda Kateb
- Cinematography: Guillaume Deffontaines
- Edited by: Juliette Welfling
- Music by: Nick Cave; Warren Ellis
- Distributed by: Pathé
- Release dates: 31 August 2014 (Venice); 14 January 2015 (France)
- Running time: 110 minutes
- Country: France
- Languages: French; Arabic; Spanish
- Budget: $5.4 million
- Box office: $835,031

Far from Men (French: Loin des hommes) is a 2014 French period drama film directed by David Oelhoffen, starring Viggo Mortensen and Reda Kateb, based on Albert Camus' short story "The Guest", from his 1957 Exile and the Kingdom collection.

Set in French Colonial Algeria, the narrative follows Daru, a reclusive, pacifist pied-noir teacher and war veteran (Mortensen), tasked with delivering Mohammad, a docile Algerian murder suspect (Kateb), into the hands of French authorities as the Algerian War of Independence ignites.

Far from Men was selected to compete for the Golden Lion at the 71st Venice International Film Festival. It was screened in the Special Presentations section of the 2014 Toronto International Film Festival.

== Plot ==
The events of the movie take place in French Colonial Algeria, on the eve of its war for independence in 1954. Daru, a pied-noir school-teacher goes about his day teaching geography to the Algerian children from nearby villages, playing with them, and giving grain to their families. One of Daru's acquaintances shows up to his isolated schoolhouse to warn him about rising tensions between the Algerian resistance and the French regime.

The following morning, Balducci, a French gendarme and friend to Daru, brings an Arab prisoner (who we find out is called Mohamed later on) to Daru's schoolhouse. Balducci informs Daru that he must take this prisoner to the nearby town, Tinguit, and hand him over to the police department over there. He claims that he is unable to, due to there being a lack of forces to prevent a potential uprising in the town of El Ameur. Daru is displeased with the orders being given to him and outright refuses to comply. Despite Mohamed having killed his cousin over the theft of grain, Daru insists that it is out of the question for him to take the man to the authorities as they will most probably sentence him to death without much deliberation. Balducci, frustrated, tells Daru that French authorities already have an eye on him due to his friendliness with the locals. He then starts his trip back to El Ameur, leaving the prisoner and his fate in the hands of Daru.

After sharing a meal together, Daru sets up a bed for Mohamed, ensuring he is treated like a regular guest. At night, Mohamed falls sick prompting Daru to tend to him. This helps ease the tension and grow trust between the two men. The next morning, Daru is suddenly faced by a group of men in horses demanding he hand over their cousin. The situation quickly escalates and Daru is forced to use a firearm to fend them off. After shooting one of their horses, the men disperse and flee whilst promising revenge. After the situation cools down, Daru heatedly confronts Mohamed, blaming him for the events that had just taken place. Mohamed in turn asks Daru to take him to the authorities in Tinguit, to which Daru responds to by telling him to go by himself. Mohamed reluctantly goes through with this, only to be met by Daru quickly having a change of heart and agreeing to take the trip with him.

Daru proceeds to pack essentials for the trek but just as they are about to leave, they are met with a group of Frenchmen searching for a man guilty of slaughtering their cattle. When they see Mohamed, they ask Daru if he was the man in question. Daru explains his situation, but the men insist that they can take care of his prisoner and call it a day. After Daru's refusal to leave it to them, one of the Frenchmen gets agitated and threatens Daru with his gun. Daru quickly turns the situation around and holds the man at gunpoint. He expresses his empathy towards him having lost his cattle and then asks them all to leave.

Finally, after all this trouble, Daru and Mohamed finally embark on their trip to Tinguit. Unfortunately, not much time passes until they spot Mohamed's cousins in the distance searching for them. To avoid any further conflict, they deviate and follow a perilous path through the mountains. Shortly after, they accidentally confront a lone armed man riding a horse. The man is shown to be hesitant to pull the trigger as both parties try to de-escalate the situation. Nevertheless, the man fires the first shot and misses to which Daru is forced to retaliate with a shot to the chest. Daru quickly scrambles to try and resuscitate him but to no avail. Angered and frustrated, Daru calls Mohamed a coward with no honor. Mohamed ignores this and begins to recite prayers in front of the man's body and then buries him with sand. The situation cools down and both men continue their hike through the desert.

Several hours of walking later, a heavy rain settles and the duo rush back to an abandoned village they had passed by earlier to take shelter and stay warm. Once rested and refuged from mother nature, Mohamed explains to Daru why and how he got himself into this mess. He had killed his cousin for stealing grain since this grain was essential to keeping his parents and siblings fed. Had he let it happen, his family would have starved to death. Furthermore, his family was not able to pay the "blood-money" to appease their cousins, forcing Mohamed to flee and turn himself in to French authorities. If he were to die at the hands of the French, then his cousins would have nobody to take out their revenge on and neither would Mohamed's siblings seek retribution over their cousins. This was the only solution to Mohamed.

After having spent the night at the abandoned village, the pair are once again met with a group of armed men riding horses. This time, they were part of the Algerian rebellion and were currently on their way to their base camp. They quickly confiscate any arms that Daru and Mohamed were holding and decide to take them as temporary hostages. While held captive at the rebel base camp, Daru takes note of a man who he recognized to have been an old friend from his days in the infantry. After a light-hearted reunion, Slimane, Daru's friend, unties both of the hostages' hands. This cheerful moment is unfortunately short-lived as the rebels receive word that French troops are approaching. Consequently, everybody in the camp packs up and start heading towards a nearby cave in order to hide.

In the cave, Slimane explains to Daru how he must decide whether he was with or against the rebellion. Daru, who had no intention to take part in any war, was caught aback by this as he had lived all of his life in Algeria and had no qualms with either side. Slimane nevertheless leaves the decision up to Daru. After this tense exchange, Daru and Mohamed recount their experiences with women before going to sleep. Daru explains to Mohamed how he got married in the city of Algiers but unfortunately lost his wife. On the other hand, Mohamed never had the chance to get married and had never been with a woman.

The following morning, the rebels are ambushed by French soldiers just as they leave the cave. The situation intensifies so much that the rebels are forced to flee from a back entrance to the cave. While escaping, most rebels are killed with only a few managing to escape, including Slimane. Daru confronts the French troops and explains that Mohamed and him are mere hostages and are not involved in the uprising. The French lieutenant verifies over radio that Daru was a major in the army with a prisoner assigned to him and promptly releases them. Finally left to their own, Daru and Mohamed continue their walk through the Algerian desert.

Before reaching Tinguit, Daru decides to take Mohamed to the town of Berzina where he was born. There, Daru reveals to Mohamed that his parents were actually from Spain and he had in fact no French blood in him. Because of this, Daru had always felt like an outsider in Algeria. He then takes Mohamed to a bar in order to hire an escort for him. The bar owner, who knew Daru when he was young, also hired him an escort. After this stop, the duo continue their trek.

Once Tinguit is finally in view, Daru offers Mohamed two choices. The first was to continue forward to Tinguit and hand himself over to the authorities as he had planned. The second was to follow a secondary path that would lead him to a community of nomads willing to take him in. Mohamed deliberates over this for a long time but ultimately chooses the path towards the nomads. After saying their goodbyes, Daru returns to his schoolhouse where he would teach his final lesson to his students before permanently leaving.

== Cast ==
- Viggo Mortensen as Daru
- Reda Kateb as Mohamed
- Djemel Barek as Slimane
- Vincent Martin as Balducci
- Nicolas Giraud as Lieutenant Le Tallec
- Jean-Jerome Esposito as Francis
- Hatim Sadiki as Abdelkader
- Yann Goven as Rene
- Antoine Régent as Claude

== Adaptation from "The Guest" ==
In order to adapt "The Guest", a short story of 8 pages, into a feature-length film, Oelhoffen took numerous liberties in regards to how the plot, characters, and themes are presented.

Firstly, the original takes place solely in the isolated schoolhouse whereas Far From Men takes Daru and Mohamed around several places in the surrounding desert. Furthermore, new characters, such as Slimane, Rene, and Lieutenant Le Tallec, are introduced holding minor roles in the overarching story. In turn, they present the plot with twists such as Daru and Mohamed being held hostage by the Algerian rebels and consequently French troops. Despite all the additions the film presented, both media nevertheless conclude the story with similar endings. The only key difference present in the film would be Mohamed's choice to seek out freedom instead of turning himself in to authorities in Tinguit.

A second major aspect that was altered in the movie would be the characterization of Daru and Mohamed. In the short story, Daru does not choose the prisoner's fate but instead leaves it up to him. This reflects both his innate rejection of the man along with his indecision in picking a side in the ongoing French-Algerian conflict. In contrast, the film shows Daru actively harboring empathy and care for Mohamed whilst being unable to choose a side in the war. Furthermore, Daru even relates to Mohamed in being shunned by the French as he is of Spanish descent, a detail that was not present in the short story. This all paints Daru as a morally correct protagonist with little to no flaws as opposed to Camus' depiction of an indecisive man, caught between his racial prejudice and his principles. To add on to all this, Mohamed's character is vastly different in the film. Originally, the short story depicts Mohamed to be a complacent individual who has no say in deciding his fate as it is Daru who makes all his decisions and orders him around. Camus does not even name him and only refers to him as "the Arab". This is further amplified by his decision to give himself in to the French at the end of the story. On the other hand, Oelhoffen's Mohamed starts out similar to Camus' "Arab" but over time develops self-determination and a sense of honor and pride. Examples of this would be his verbal retaliation directed at Daru after he called him a coward and also his plan of getting caught in order to spare his family trouble. His self-determination is even made explicit when it is shown that he discovered his own worth after choosing to follow the path leading to the Nomads, and in turn freedom.

Thirdly, another variation between the short story and its adaptation would be how the theme of existentialism was portrayed. In "The Guest", Camus portrays Daru's decision (or lack of one) at the end of the story to be a meaningless one since regardless of what he chooses to do, it can be inferred that he will meet the same fate - death. If he turns in the prisoner, he would be killed by the man's family (which is how the story ends) and if he were to release him, he would in turn be prosecuted by the French authorities. While this is an unfortunate conclusion, it is equally realistic, bearing plentiful philosophical significance. Oelhoffen, in turn, decides to challenge this grim end by showing that both Daru and Mohamed can in fact find a happiness despite all their struggles. Consequently, this dis-intensifies the discussion on existentialism and causes it to resemble Western-style movies through the clichés it employs.

== Themes ==
Viggo Mortensen said that, as he was making the film, he thought about "European versus native populations in America, but also about Gaza" and "the artificial country called Iraq that was created by Europeans and is now falling apart.

== Reception ==
=== Critical response ===
The movie was well received by the critics. Review aggregator Rotten Tomatoes reports that 79% of 24 critics gave the film a positive review, for an average rating of 6.8/10. Metacritic, which assigns a normalized rating out of 100 to reviews from mainstream critics, calculated a "generally favorable" average score of 74, based on 13 reviews.

According to Manohla Dargis of The New York Times, "Camus sets the movie's initial course, but Mr. Oelhoffen resolutely steers it home with political context, historical hindsight, an unambiguous moral imperative and a pair of well-matched performances."

=== Accolades ===
Ceremony	Category	Nominee	Result
71st Venice International Film Festival	SIGNIS Award	Far from Men	Won
71st Venice International Film Festival	Arca CinemaGiovani Award for Best Film of Venezia 71	Far from Men	Won
71st Venice International Film Festival	Interfilm Award for Promoting Interreligious Dialogue	Far from Men	Won
