= L'Hôte =

L'Hôte may refer to:

- Jean L'Hôte (1929–1985), French screenwriter and film director
- the original French title of The Guest, short story by Albert Camus from 1957
