= Correspondance (1944–1959) =

Correspondence 1944–1959 (French: Correspondance 1944–1959) is a book published in 2017, containing the love letters of the Nobel awarded author Albert Camus and his lover, actress Maria Casarès. Casarès handed her letters to Camus's daughter, Cathrine Camus. The book was a best-seller in France. Camus's humour is evident in the book, accompanied by his despair.
