= Betwixt and Between =

1937 book by Albert Camus

L'Envers et l'endroit
- Cover of the 1958 edition
- Author: Albert Camus
- Language: French
- Publication place: France

Betwixt and Between (L'Envers et l'endroit, also translated as The Wrong Side and the Right Side, Collection, 1937) is a work of non-fiction by Albert Camus.

Betwixt and Between is the first work of Albert Camus published under his own name, in Algiers in 1937 by Edmond Charlot. It consists of a series of essays on the Algerian district of Belcourt as well as on two trips, the first to the Balearic Islands and the second to Prague and Venice. The book was barely distributed during the war and did not take advantage of the success of The Stranger and The Myth of Sisyphus after the war. It was reprinted in 1958, with a preface in which Camus takes stock of his work to date and critically judges his writing. He declares that "his work has not even begun." Camus saw in this early work the secret source of all his thought: "I know that my source is in Betwixt and Between, in this world of poverty and light where I have lived for a long time and whose memory still preserves me from the two contrary dangers which threaten every artist, resentment and satisfaction.
