= Michel Gallimard =

French publisher (1917–1960)

Michel Gallimard (1917 – January 9, 1960) was a French publisher.

Michel Gallimard was a nephew of Gaston Gallimard who considered him his spiritual son.

== Biography ==
=== Career ===
In 1946, Michel Gallimard met Albert Camus while the latter completed the writing of his novel La Peste, and the two of them became good friends. Four years later, he became friends with Boris Vian during an evening organized by Gaston Gallimard. In September of 1951, he was responsible for negotiating the acquisition of Éditions Denoël and was also entrusted with the management of the library of the Pléiade by his uncle.

=== Accident and death ===
On the morning of January 4, 1960, Michel Gallimard and Albert Camus were driving to Paris. At 1:55 pm, shortly after crossing Pont-sur-Yonne, the car crashed violently against a plane tree. Albert Camus died instantly. Michel Gallimard, seriously injured, died five days later, on January 9, 1960, at the age of 42. Gallimard's wife and daughter, Janine and Anne Gallimard, escaped unscathed.
