= Villeblevin =

- Commune
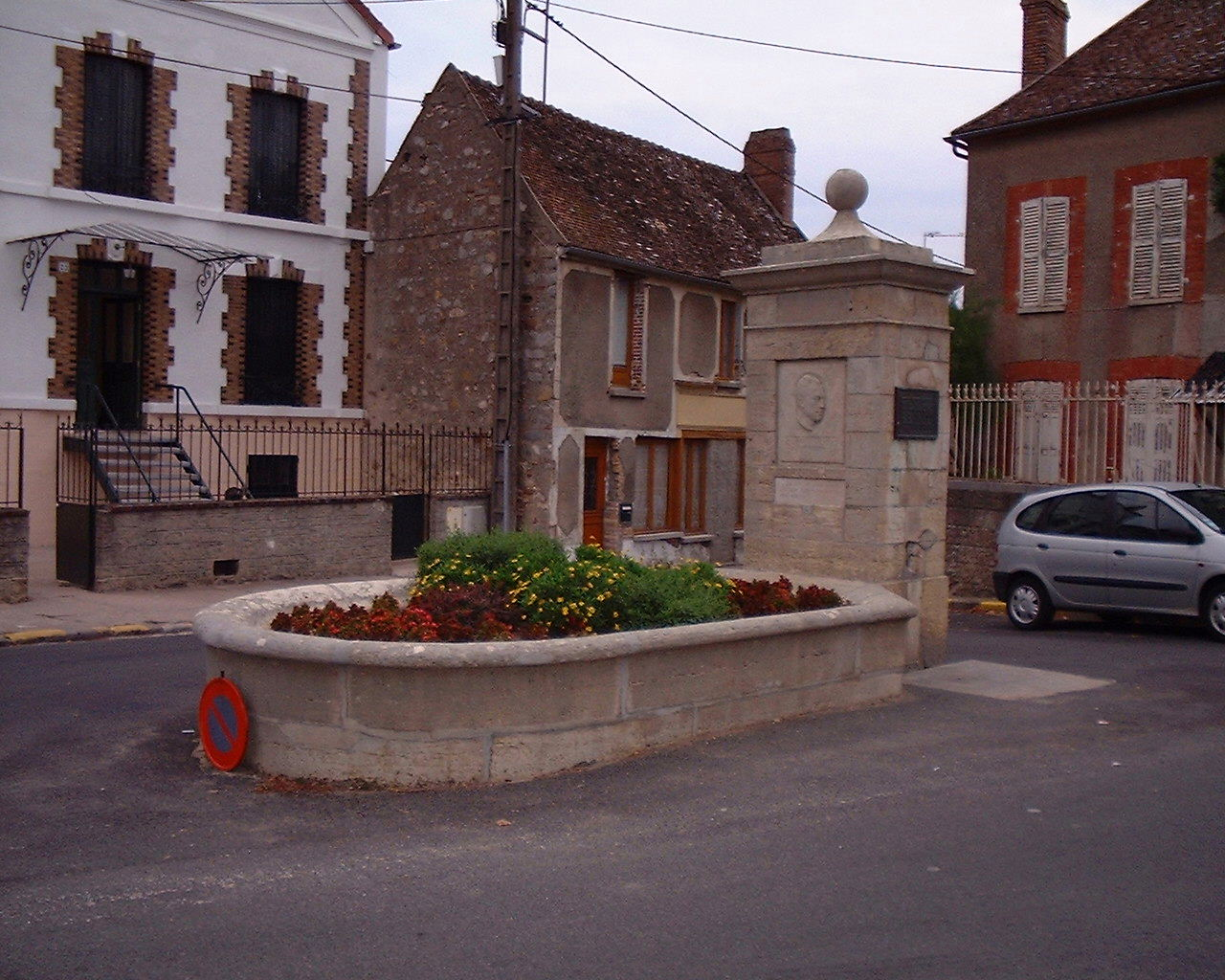
- Monument to Albert Camus

- Coat of arms
- Location of Villeblevin
- Location within France Location within Bourgogne-Franche-Comté
- Coordinates: 48°19′31″N 3°04′57″E
- Country: France
- Region: Bourgogne-Franche-Comté
- Department: Yonne
- Arrondissement: Sens
- Canton: Pont-sur-Yonne

Government
  - Mayor (2020–2026): Thierry Spahn
- Area^{1}: 7.36 km^{2} (2.84 sq mi)
- Highest elevation: 118 m (387 ft)
- Lowest elevation: 53 m (174 ft)
- Population (2023): 1,795
  - Density: 244/km^{2} (632/sq mi)
- Time zone: UTC+01:00 (CET)
  - Summer (DST): UTC+02:00 (CEST)
- INSEE/Postal code: 89449 /89340
- ^{1} French Land Register data, which excludes lakes, ponds, glaciers > 1 km^{2} (0.386 sq mi or 247 acres) and river estuaries.

Villeblevin (French pronunciation: [vil.bləvɛ̃]) is a commune in the Yonne department in Bourgogne-Franche-Comté in north-central France.

The town achieved prominence in 1960 when it was the site of the car crash that killed Albert Camus. A monument to Albert Camus is located at 48°19'28.0" north, 3°04'56.4" east. The site where Michel Gallimard's Facel-Vega crashed against a plane tree killing Camus instantly was on the Nationale 6 (now Départmentale 606) at the height of Petit-Villeblevin.

== See also ==
- Communes of the Yonne department
