= American Journals =

Autobiographical work by Albert Camus

- Author: Albert Camus
- Genre: Autobiography
- Publication date: 1978
- ISBN: 978-2-7449-0376-2

American Journals (Journaux de voyage) is an autobiographical book by the French Nobel laureate Albert Camus. It was published in the original French in 1978 and in an English translation in 1987. Camus describes his journeys in North and South America. He travelled in the United States from March to May 1946, and in Latin America from June to August 1949. While he was in Latin America, he suffered from a tuberculosis crisis. Roger Quilliot edited the book.
