= The Fall (Camus novel) =

1956 philosophical novel by Albert Camus

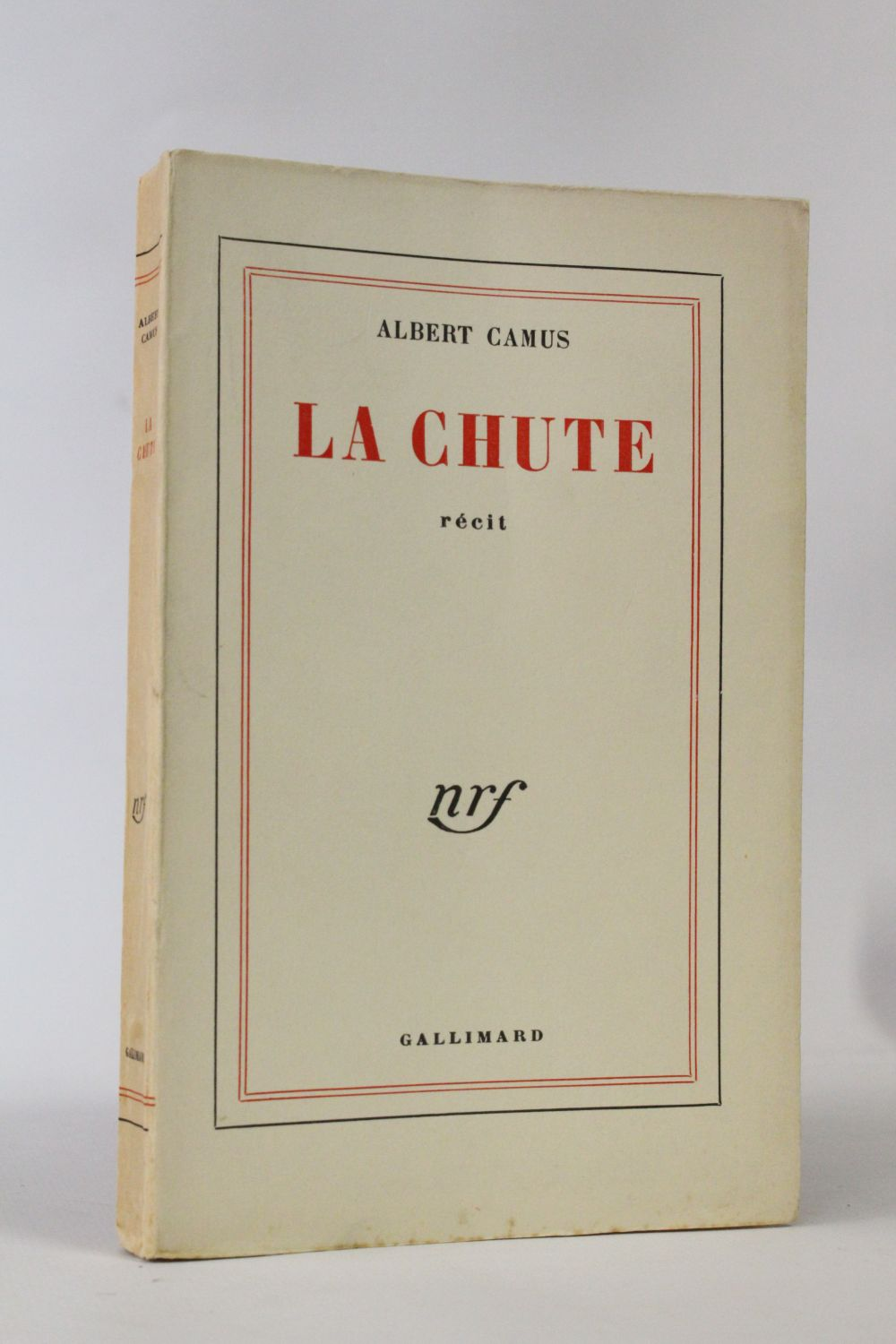
- Cover of the first edition
- Author: Albert Camus
- Original title: La Chute
- Translator: Justin O'Brien (1956); Robin Buss (2006)
- Language: French
- Genre: Philosophical novel
- Publisher: Vintage Books (Random House)
- Publication date: 1956
- Publication place: France
- English publication date: 1957
- Media type: Print
- Pages: 147
- ISBN: 0-394-70223-9 (Paperback)
- OCLC: 10362653

The Fall (French: La Chute) is a philosophical novel by Albert Camus. First published in 1956, it is his last complete work of fiction. Set in Amsterdam, The Fall consists of a series of dramatic monologues by the self-proclaimed "judge-penitent" Jean-Baptiste Clamence, as he reflects upon his life to a stranger. In what amounts to a confession, Clamence tells of his success as a wealthy Parisian defense lawyer who was highly respected by his colleagues. His crisis, and his ultimate "fall" from grace, was meant to invoke, in secular terms, the fall of man from the Garden of Eden. The Fall explores themes of innocence, imprisonment, non-existence, and truth. In a eulogy to Albert Camus, existentialist philosopher Jean-Paul Sartre described the novel as "perhaps the most beautiful and the least understood" of Camus's books.

== Setting ==
Clamence often speaks of his love for high, open places—everything from mountain peaks to the top decks of boats. "I have never felt comfortable", he explains, "except in lofty surroundings. Even in the details of daily life, I need to feel above." Then it is paradoxical that Clamence leads his cher ami away from the human symmetries of a picturesque town to sit on a level, seaside expanse. The location of Amsterdam, as a city below sea-level, therefore assumes particular significance in relation to the narrator. Moreover, Amsterdam is generally described in The Fall as a cold, wet place where a thick blanket of fog constantly hangs over the crowded, neon-light-lined streets. Beside the atmosphere (which could be established almost anywhere else) the city also was chosen by Camus for a more peculiar reason. In the opening pages Clamence casually remarks,

Have you noticed that Amsterdam's concentric canals resemble the circles of hell? The middle-class hell, of course, peopled with bad dreams. When one comes from the outside, as one gradually goes through those circles, life — and hence its crimes — becomes denser, darker. Here, we are in the last circle. (Camus 23)

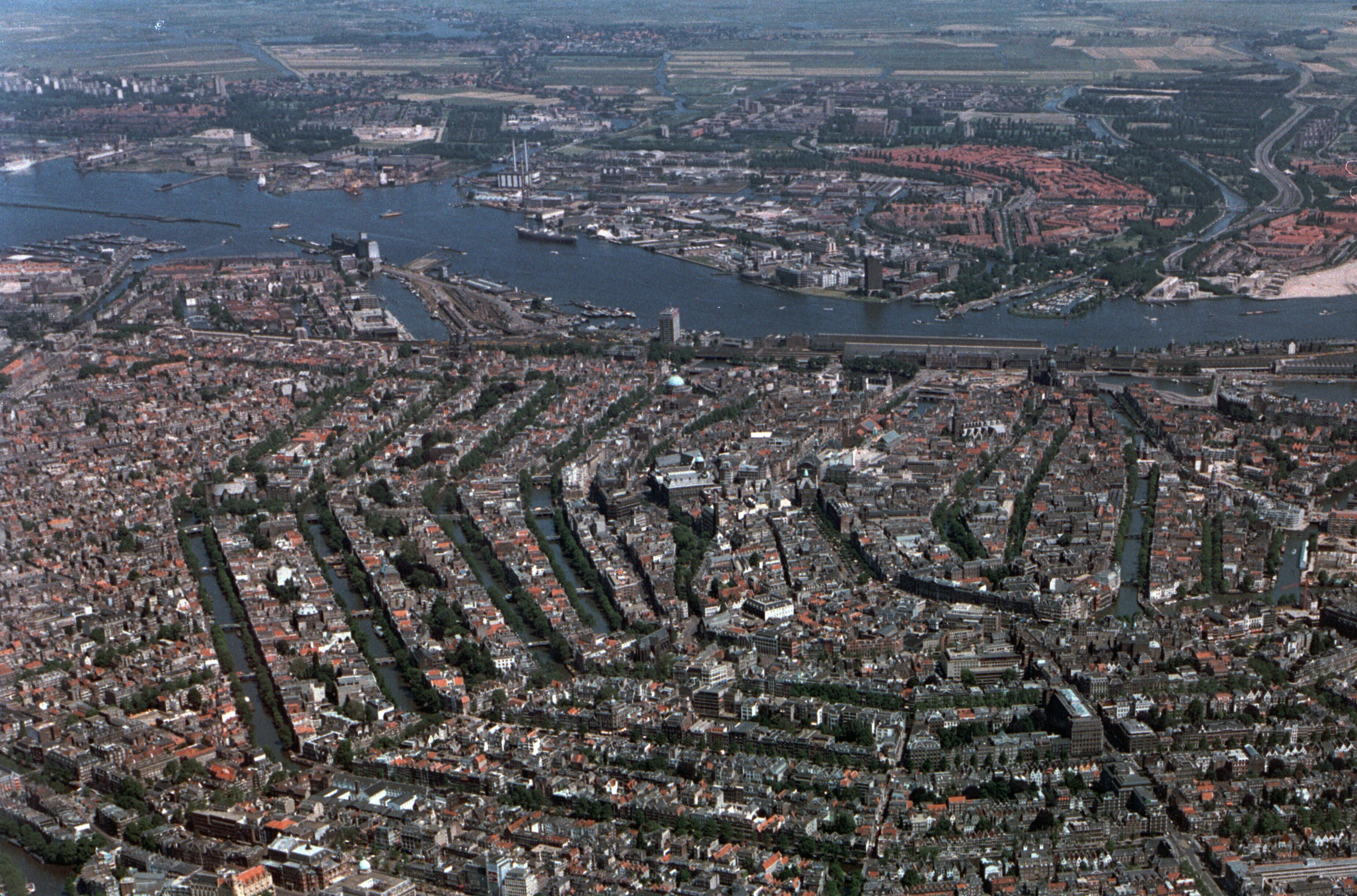
Amsterdam

The "last circle of hell" is the site of Amsterdam's red-light district and the location of a bar named Mexico City, (Note: The bar Mexico City did exist in Amsterdam.) which Clamence frequents nightly, and where the bulk of his narrative gradually unfolds. The setting thus serves to illustrate, literally and metaphorically, Clamence's fall from the heights of high-class Paris society to the dark, dreary, Dantesque underworld of Amsterdam, where tortured souls wander aimlessly among each other. Indeed, critics have explored at length the parallels between Clamence's fall and Dante's descent through Hell in the Inferno (see Galpin, King).

It is also significant, particularly as Camus develops his philosophical ideas, that the story develops against the backdrop of the Second World War and the Holocaust. Clamence tells us that he lives only a short distance from Mexico City, in what was—formerly—the Jewish Quarter, "until our Hitlerian brethren spaced it out a bit. ... I am living on the site of one of the greatest crimes in history" (Camus 281). The naming of the bar also recalls the destruction of the Aztec civilization whose ruined capital has been supplanted by modern Mexico City.

Among other things, The Fall is an attempt to explain how humankind could be capable of perpetrating such evils.

== Synopsis ==
=== Life in Paris ===
The novel opens with Clamence sitting in the bar Mexico City casually talking to a stranger (who is referred to in the second person) about the proper way to order a drink, since the bartender refuses to respond to anything other than Dutch. Thus, Clamence serves as interpreter and he and the stranger, having discovered that they are fellow compatriots who, moreover, both hail from Paris, begin discussing more substantive matters.

Clamence tells us that he used to lead a good life in Paris as a successful and well-respected defence lawyer. The vast majority of his work centred around "widow and orphan" cases; that is, the poor and disenfranchised who otherwise would be unable to provide themselves with a proper defence before the law. He also relates anecdotes about how he always enjoyed giving friendly directions to strangers on the streets, yielding to others his seat on the bus, giving alms to the poor, and, above all, helping the blind to cross the street. In short, Clamence conceived of himself as living purely for the sake of others and "achieving more than the vulgar ambitious man and rising to that supreme summit where virtue is its own reward" (Camus 288).

Late one night when crossing the Pont Royal on his way home from his "mistress", however, Clamence comes across a woman dressed in black leaning over the edge of the bridge. He hesitates for a moment, thinking the sight strange at such an hour and given the barrenness of the streets, but continues on his way nevertheless. He had only walked a short distance when he heard the distinct sound of a body hitting the water. Clamence stops walking, knowing exactly what has happened, but does nothing—in fact, he doesn't even turn around. The sound of screaming was

repeated several times, [as it went] downstream; then it abruptly ceased. The silence that followed, as the night suddenly stood still, seemed interminable. I wanted to run and yet didn't move an inch. I was trembling, I believe from cold and shock. I told myself that I had to be quick and felt an irresistible weakness steal over me. I have forgotten what I thought then. "Too late, too far..." or something of the sort. I was still listening as I stood motionless. Then, slowly, in the rain, I went away. I told no one. (Camus 314)

Despite Clamence's view of himself as a selfless advocate for the weak and unfortunate, he simply ignores the incident and continues on his way. He later elaborates that his failure to do anything was most probably because doing so would have required him to put his own personal safety in jeopardy.

Several years after the suicide of the woman off the Pont Royal—and the purging of the event from his memory—Clamence is on his way home one autumn evening after a day of work. He pauses on the empty Pont des Arts and reflects:

I was happy. The day had been good: a blind man, the reduced sentence I had hoped for, a cordial handclasp from my client, a few generous actions and, in the afternoon, a brilliant improvisation in the company of several friends on the hard-handedness of our governing class and the hypocrisy of our leaders. ... I felt rising within me a vast feeling of power and—I don't know how to express it—of completion, which cheered my heart. I straightened up and was about to light a cigarette, the cigarette of satisfaction, when, at that very moment, a laugh burst out behind me. (Camus 296)

Clamence turns around to discover that the laughter, of course, was not directed at him, but probably originated from a far-off conversation between friends—such is the rational course of his thought. Nevertheless, he tells us that "I could still hear it distinctly behind me, coming from nowhere unless from the water." The laughter is thus alarming because it immediately reminds him of his obvious failure to do anything whatsoever about the woman who had presumably drowned years before. The unlucky coincidence for Clamence here is that he is reminded of this precisely at the moment when he is congratulating himself for being such a selfless individual. Furthermore, the laughter is described as a "good, hearty, almost friendly laugh", whereas, mere moments later, he describes himself as possessing a "good, hearty badger" (Camus 297). This implies that the laughter originated within himself, adding another dimension to the inner meaning of the scene. That evening on the Pont des Arts represents, for Clamence, the collision of his true self with his inflated self-image, and the final realization of his own hypocrisy becomes painfully obvious.

A third and final incident initiates Clamence's downward spiral. One day while waiting at a stoplight, Clamence finds that he is trapped behind a motorcycle which has stalled ahead of him and is unable to proceed once the light changes to green as a result. Other cars behind him start honking their horns, and Clamence politely asks the man several times if he would please move his motorcycle off the road so that others can drive around him; however, with each repetition of the request, the motorcyclist becomes increasingly agitated and threatens Clamence with physical violence.

Angry, Clamence exits his vehicle in order to confront the man when someone else intervenes and "informed me that I was the scum of the earth and that he would not allow me to strike a man who had a motor-cycle [sic] between his legs and hence was at a disadvantage" (Camus 303-4). Clamence turns to respond to his interlocutor when suddenly the motorcyclist punches him in the side of the head and then speeds off. Without retaliating against his interlocutor, Clamence, utterly humiliated, merely returns to his car and drives away. Later, he runs through his mind "a hundred times" what he thinks he should have done—namely strike his interlocutor, then chase after the motorcyclist and run him off the road. The feeling of resentment gnaws away at him, and Clamence explains that

after having been struck in public without reacting, it was no longer possible for me to cherish that fine picture of myself. If I had been the friend of truth and intelligence I claimed to be, what would that episode have mattered to me? It was already forgotten by those who had witnessed it. (Camus 305)

Clamence thus arrives at the conclusion that his whole life has in fact been lived in search of honour, recognition, and power over others. Having realized this, he can no longer live the way he once did.

=== Crisis ===
Clamence initially attempts to resist the sense that he has lived hypocritically and selfishly. He argues with himself over his prior acts of kindness, but quickly discovers that this is an argument he cannot win. He reflects, for example, that whenever he had helped a blind man across the street—something he especially enjoyed doing—he would doff his hat to the man. Since the blind man obviously cannot see this acknowledgement, Clamence asks, "To whom was it addressed? To the public. After playing my part, I would take my bow" (Camus 301). As a result, he comes to see himself as duplicitous and hypocritical.

This realization precipitates an emotional and intellectual crisis for Clamence which, moreover, he is unable to avoid, having now discovered it; the sound of laughter that first struck him on the Pont des Arts slowly begins to permeate his entire existence. In fact, Clamence even begins laughing at himself as he defends matters of justice and fairness in court. Unable to ignore it, Clamence attempts to silence the laughter by throwing off his hypocrisy and ruining the reputation he acquired therefrom.

Clamence proceeds to "destroy that flattering reputation" (Camus 326) primarily by making public comments that he knows will be received as objectionable: telling beggars that they are "embarrassing people", declaring his regret at not being able to hold serfs and beat them at his whim, and announcing the publication of a "manifesto exposing the oppression that the oppressed inflict on decent people". In fact, Clamence even goes so far as to consider

jostling the blind on the street; and from the secret, unexpected joy this gave me I recognized how much a part of my soul loathed them; I planned to puncture the tyres of wheelchairs, to go and shout 'lousy proletarian' under the scaffoldings on which labourers were working, to smack infants in the subway. ... the very word 'justice' gave me strange fits of rage. (Camus 325)

To Clamence's frustration and dismay, however, his efforts in this regard are ineffective, generally because many of the people around him refuse to take him seriously; they find it inconceivable that a man of his reputation could ever say such things and not be joking. Clamence eventually realizes that his attempts at self-derision can only fail, and the laughter continues to gnaw at him. This is because his actions are just as dishonest: "In order to forestall the laughter, I dreamed of hurling myself into the general derision. In fact, it was still a question of dodging judgment. I wanted to put the laughers on my side, or at least to put myself on their side" (Camus 325).

Ultimately, Clamence responds to his emotional–intellectual crisis by withdrawing from the world on precisely those terms. He closes his law practice, avoids his former colleagues in particular and people in general, and throws himself completely into uncompromising debauchery; while humankind may be grossly hypocritical in the areas from which he has withdrawn, "no man is a hypocrite in his pleasures" (Camus 311—a quotation from Samuel Johnson). Debauchery (women and alcohol) does prove a temporarily effective means of silencing the laughter—the biting sense of his own hypocrisy—because, as he explains, it thoroughly dulls his wits. Unfortunately, he finds himself unable to maintain this lifestyle due to personal failings that he describes as follows: "...my liver and an exhaustion so terrible that it still has not left me (?)"

=== Life in Amsterdam ===
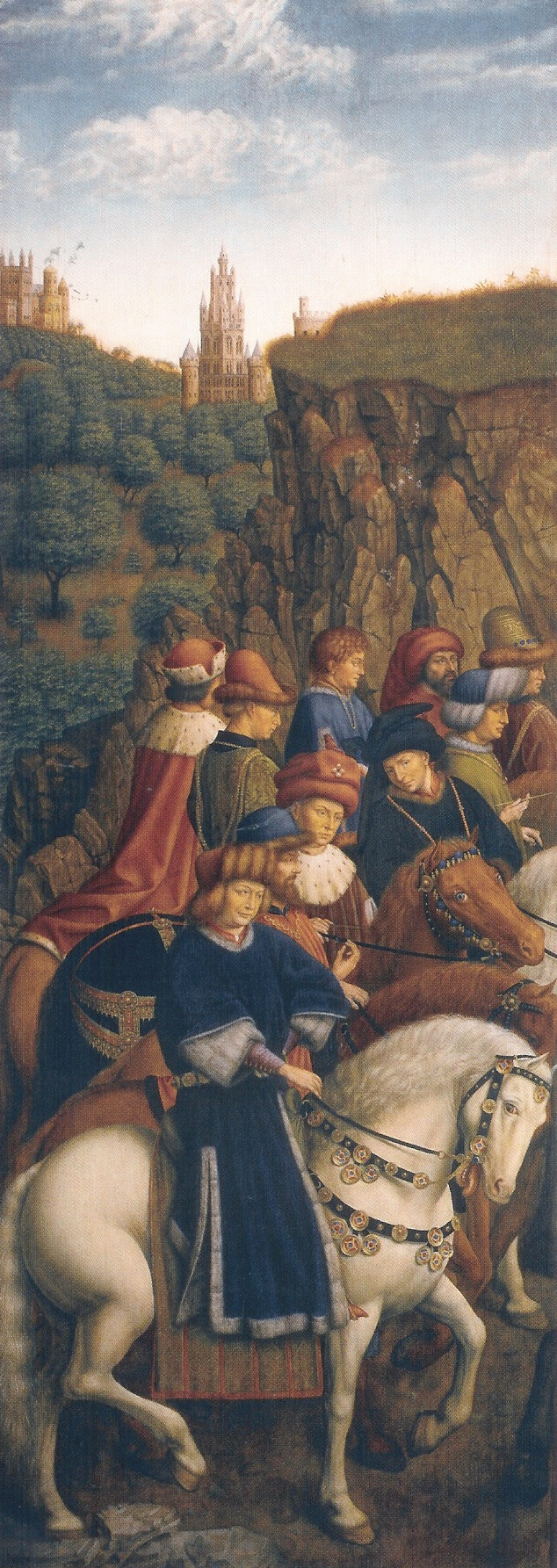
Copy of the panel from the Ghent Altarpiece known as The Just Judges by Jef Van der Veken. The original was stolen in 1934 and never recovered.

The last of Clamence's monologues takes place in his apartment in the (former) Jewish Quarter of Amsterdam, and recounts more specifically the events which shaped his current outlook; in this regard his experiences during the Second World War are crucial. With the outbreak of war and the fall of France, Clamence considers joining the French Resistance, but decides that doing so would ultimately be futile. He explains,

The undertaking struck me as a little mad ... I think especially that underground action suited neither my temperament nor my preference for exposed heights. It seemed to me that I was being asked to do some weaving in a cellar, for days and nights on end, until some brutes should come to haul me from hiding, undo my weaving and then drag me to another cellar to beat me to death. I admired those who indulged in such heroism of the depths but couldn't imitate them. (Camus 342)

Instead, Clamence decides to flee Paris for London, and takes an indirect route there, moving through North Africa; however, he meets a friend while in Africa and decides to stay and find work, eventually settling in Tunis. But after the Allies land in Africa, Clamence is arrested by the Germans and thrown into a concentration camp—"chiefly [as] a security measure", he assures himself (Camus 343).

While interned, Clamence meets a comrade whom he compares to Du Guesclin and subsequently refers to by that name. Du Guesclin had fought in the Spanish Civil War, was captured by "the Catholic general", and now found himself in the hands of the Germans in Africa. These experiences subsequently caused the man to lose his faith in the Catholic Church (and perhaps in God as well); as a form of protest, Du Guesclin announces the need for a new Pope—one who will "agree to keep alive, in himself and in others, the community of our sufferings"—to be chosen from among the prisoners in the camp. As the man with "the most failings", Clamence jokingly volunteers himself, but finds that the other prisoners agree with his appointment. As a result of being selected to lead a group of prisoners as "Pope", Clamence is afforded certain powers over them, such as how to distribute food and water and deciding who will do what kind of work. "Let's just say that I closed the circle", he confesses, "the day I drank the water of a dying comrade. No, no, it wasn't Du Guesclin; he was already dead, I believe, for he stinted himself too much" (Camus 343–4).

Clamence then relates the story of how a famous fifteenth-century painting, a panel from the Ghent Altarpiece known as The Just Judges, came into his possession. One evening a regular patron of Mexico City entered the bar with the priceless painting and sold it for a bottle of jenever to the bartender who, for a time, displayed the piece prominently on the wall of his bar. (Both the man who sold the painting and the now-vacant place on the wall where it hung are cryptically pointed out at the beginning of the novel.) However, Clamence eventually informs the bartender that the painting is in fact stolen, that police from several countries are searching for it, and offers to keep it for him; the bartender immediately agrees to the proposal. Clamence attempts to justify his possession of the stolen painting in a number of ways, primarily "because those judges are on their way to meet the Lamb, because there is no lamb or innocence any longer, and because the clever rascal who stole the panel was an instrument of the unknown justice that one ought not to thwart" (Camus 346).

Finally, Clamence employs the imagery of the Ghent Altarpiece and The Just Judges to explain his self-identification as a "judge-penitent". This essentially espouses a doctrine of relinquished freedom as a method of enduring the suffering imposed on us by virtue of living in a world without objective truth and one that is therefore, ultimately meaningless. With the death of God, one must also accept by extension the idea of universal guilt and the impossibility of innocence. Clamence's argument posits, somewhat paradoxically, that freedom from suffering is attained only through submission to something greater than oneself. Clamence, through his confession, sits in permanent judgment of himself and others, spending his time persuading those around him of their own unconditional guilt. The novel ends on a sinister note:

Pronounce to yourself the words that years later haven't ceased to resound through my nights, and which I will speak at last through your mouth: "O young girl, throw yourself again into the water so that I might have a second time the chance to save the two of us!" A second time, eh, what imprudence! Suppose, dear sir, someone actually took our word for it? It would have to be fulfilled. Brr...! the water is so cold! But let's reassure ourselves. It's too late now, it will always be too late. Fortunately!

== Publication history ==
- 1956, La Chute (French), Paris: Gallimard
- 1956, The Fall (translated by Justin O'Brien)
- 2006, The Fall (translated by Robin Buss), London: Penguin
