= A Happy Death =

1971 novel by Albert Camus

- Cover of the first edition
- Author: Albert Camus
- Original title: La mort heureuse
- Language: French
- Genre: Existentialist, absurdist
- Publisher: French: Gallimard; English: Knopf
- Publication date: 1971
- Publication place: France
- English publication date: 1972
- ISBN: 0-679-76400-3
- OCLC: 33430967
- Dewey Decimal: 843/.914 20
- LC Class: PQ2605.A3734 M613 1995

A Happy Death (French: La mort heureuse) is a novel by absurdist French writer-philosopher Albert Camus. The absurdist topic of the book is the "will to happiness", the conscious creation of one's happiness, and the need of time (and money) to do so. It draws on memories of the author including his job at the maritime commission in Algiers, his suffering from tuberculosis, and his travels in Europe.

Camus composed and reworked the novel between 1936 and 1938 but then decided not to publish it. It was eventually published in 1971, over 11 years after the author's death. The English translation by Richard Howard appeared in 1972.

A Happy Death was Camus' first novel and was clearly the precursor to his most famous work, The Stranger, published in 1942. The main character in A Happy Death is named "Patrice Mersault", similar to The Stranger's "Meursault"; both are French Algerian clerks who kill another man. A Happy Death is written in the third person, whereas The Stranger is written in the first person.

== Plot ==
=== Part 1 ===
Part 1 describes the monotone and empty life of Patrice Mersault with his boring office job and a meaningless relationship with his girlfriend Marthe. Mersault gets to know the rich invalid Roland Zagreus (Zagreus is a character of Greek mythology) who shows Mersault a way out: "Only it takes time to be happy. A lot of time. Happiness, too, is a long patience. And in almost every case, we use up our lives making money, when we should be using our money to gain time." Zagreus implies that his life is a meaningless waste, and so Mersault decides to kill him in order to create his own happiness with the rich man's money.

=== Part 2 ===
Part 2 follows Mersault's subsequent trip to Europe. Traveling by train from city to city, he is unable to find peace and decides to return to Algiers, to live in a house high above the sea with three young female friends. Everybody here has only one goal: the pursuit of happiness by abandoning the world. Yet Mersault needs solitude. He marries a pleasant woman named Lucienne whom he does not love, buys a house in a village by the sea, and moves in alone. "At this hour of night, his life seemed so remote to him, he was so solitary and indifferent to everything and to himself as well, that Mersault felt he had at last attained what he was seeking, that the peace which filled him now was born of that patient self-abandonment he had pursued and achieved with the help of this warm world so willing to deny him without anger." Severely ill, he dies a happy death: "And stone among the stones, he returned in the joy of his heart to the truth of the motionless worlds."
