= The Guest (short story) =

- Short story by Albert Camus
- Original title: L'Hôte
- Country: France
- Language: French
- Genre: Absurdism

Publication
- Published in: Exile and the Kingdom
- Publication type: Collection of short stories
- Publication date: 1957

"The Guest" (French: L'Hôte) is a short story by the French writer Albert Camus. It was first published in 1957 as part of a collection entitled Exile and the Kingdom (L'exil et le royaume). The French title "L'Hôte" translates into both "the guest" and "the host" which ties back to the relationship between the main characters of the story. Camus employs this short tale to reflect upon issues raised by the political situation in French North Africa. In particular, he explores the problem of refusing to take sides in the colonial conflict in Algeria, something that mirrors Camus' own non-aligned stance which he had set out in his Nobel Prize acceptance speech.

== Plot ==
The story takes place in Algeria and begins with two men climbing a rocky slope. One of them, the gendarme Balducci, is on horseback and the other, an Arab prisoner, is on foot. At the summit of the hill, a school teacher named Daru watches them climb their way up. There are no students at the school at this time because they stayed home during the blizzard. The two men reach the top of the slope and come to meet Daru. Balducci, an acquaintance of Daru, tells Daru he is ordered by the government to take the prisoner to the police headquarters in Tinguit as a service to his fellow officers. Daru inquires about the crime the Arab committed and Balducci says that he slit his cousin's throat in a fight for some grain, and adds that the prisoner is probably not a rebel. As Balducci is leaving, Daru tells him that he will not take the Arab to Tinguit. Balducci is angered by this and makes Daru sign a paper that states the prisoner is in Daru's custody, then he leaves them. Daru feeds the Arab and gives him a cot to sleep on for the night. In the morning, Daru takes his captive slightly down the mountain and sets him free. He supplies the prisoner with a thousand francs and some food and tells him if he goes east, he can turn himself in to the police in Tinguit. If he goes south, he can hide with the nomads. Daru then goes back to the school, leaving the prisoner to make his decision. A while later, Daru looks back and sees the prisoner heading east to Tinguit, most likely to turn himself in. When Daru looks back at the blackboard in his classroom, there is a message written on it that says, "Tu as livré notre frère. Tu paieras." (You have turned in our brother, you will pay).

== Historical context ==
Because of Camus' indelible connection to his homeland, which serves as the foundations of "The Guest," the short story is often thought to reflect Camus' own revolutionary experiences during the period in which it was written. In 1956, during a time in which the Algerians were increasing their struggle against French colonialism, Camus, for the first time in fourteen years, returned to Algeria in an attempt to broker peace between the two places that he called home. There, fragments of right-wing French settlers called for his assassination, while unseen Algerian revolutionaries spied on his daily movements. Through these experiences, one can examine how the escalating violence between these two forces, with civilian casualties becoming the most common occurrence, displayed Camus' sense of individual freedom that is ultimately reflected in his work.

=== French colonialism ===
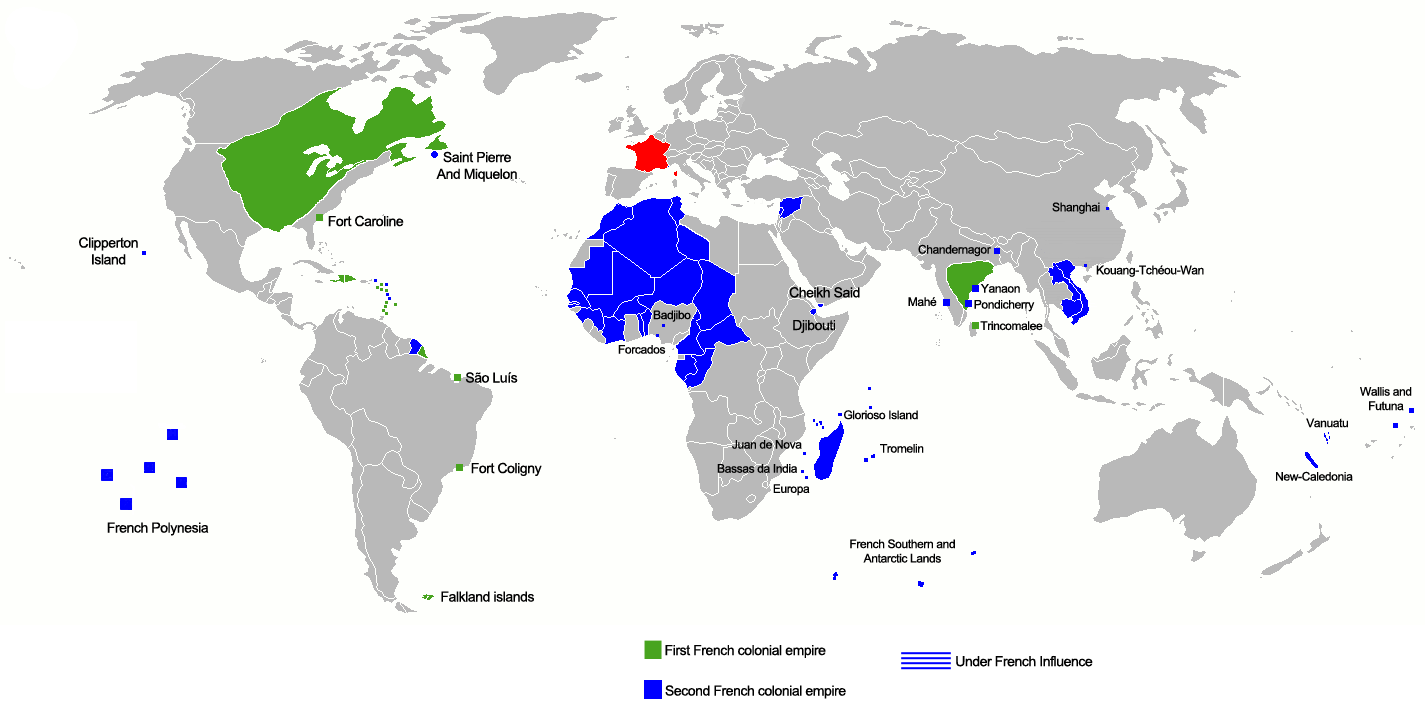
Empire of France

Although Camus considered himself to be French, he did not settle in France until he was already an established author. Instead, he grew up in French Algeria as a Pied-Noir, or a black foot—a Frenchman born in the colony to a lower-class family. This put him in the unique position of being below the les colons, or the ruling class, but also above the native population of Arabs and Berbers. As a journalist in Kabylie, Camus saw the Berbers suffer from a prolonged drought and the lack of interest exhibited by the metropolitan French toward their plight. In "The Guest," Daru is also witness to the effects of a lengthy drought and seems to understand the consequences of the indifference shown by the French.

=== Algerian war ===
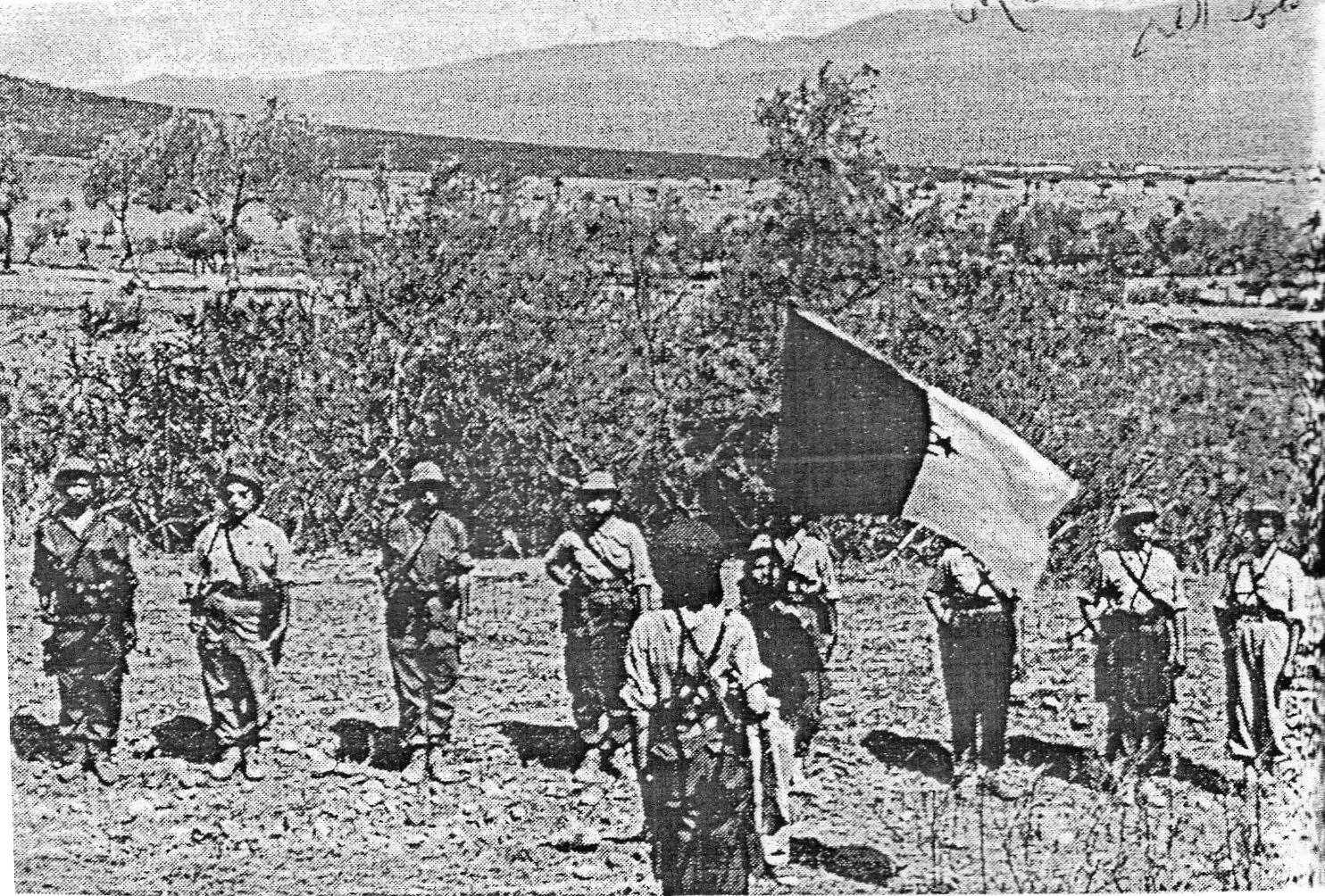
Algerian women in the War of Independence

Among the last of Camus' finished works, "The Guest" was written during the Algerian War of Independence, which lasted between 1954 and 1962, a full two years after his death, and, much like Daru, encapsulates Camus' own conflicted feelings toward the conflict itself, which left him feeling isolated and detached. Although Camus sympathized with the indigenous Algerians, he also believed that the conflict was increasing the divide between the Arabs and working-class Europeans. While many were focused on choosing a side in the conflict, Camus saw both the Arabs and the colonials as victims, united in their suffering as well as in their love for their homeland. This closely parallels Daru's journey throughout the story, suggesting that Camus was drawing heavily from his own experience as an outsider.

Literary scholars have suggested that Camus, through his portrayal of the Arab prisoner, who is depicted as being "rather stupid, and even slightly bestial," believed that indigenous peoples were unprepared for the freedom they sought. In his own political writings, such as his Algerian Chronicles, Camus even seems to suggest that a confederation made up of France and its former colonies would be the ideal, rather than letting Algeria go entirely independent, largely because he feared that the lower-class settlers would suffer as a result of this change. His fears were not entirely unfounded, as over one million pieds-noirs were forced to flee Algeria for France after Algeria was ultimately granted its independence in 1962. However, the willingness for torture and violence shown by the French military in their efforts to maintain control over a rapidly destabilizing empire unnerved and horrified Camus to the point that he could not bring himself to side with the French either.

== Major themes ==
This piece is characteristic of existentialism, the prevalent school of thought among the era's literature. It also presents Camus' concept of absurdism, as well as many examples of human choices. The dilemmas faced by Daru are often seen as representing the dilemmas faced by Camus regarding the Algerian crisis and there are many similarities between the character of Daru and his creator Camus. Both are French Algerians exiled by the choices they have made. The main themes of "The Guest" are of choice and accountability. Camus emphasizes, characteristically of existentialist philosophy, that there is always a choice, that the only choice unavailable is not to choose. Daru chooses how he will handle Balducci and whether he will turn in the prisoner; the prisoner chooses whether to go to jail or to freedom. More important, however, is the theme of accountability. The essence of Camus's philosophy is that everyone is "condemned" to an eventual, inevitable death, and accepting this allows for a certain freedom; the prisoner, having achieved self-awareness when Daru gave him the choice to flee or go to jail, realizes the futility of fleeing from the inevitable punishment and goes willingly to jail, thus revolting against the inevitable by making the decision of his own accord and holding himself accountable for the murder.

Daru's choice can also be seen as a "damned-if-you-do, damned-if-you-don't" situation. Daru makes his decision based on what he believes to be the right thing to do. The fact that he will be punished for doing the right thing does not make it any less right. The important point is that people must do what they feel is right, without worrying about how others feel, or about possible rewards or punishments.

Yet another theme can be extracted from this short story, however: complete neutrality is unattainable. This is evidenced by Daru's attempt to avoid making a decision; in the end, the Arab makes the decision for him, and he loses his neutrality.

== Literary devices ==
Symbolism: The specific location of Daru's home is symbolic of the colonial conflict in Algeria. He requested to be placed at the foothills, between the desert and the dark plateau. However, he was placed upon the plateau to be a schoolmaster. In this symbol, the desert represents the Arabs and the plateau represents the French. He was placed upon the plateau, or in other words, he was forced to join up with the French (though he wanted to remain neutral, as was his character).

Irony: Balducci was the "bad guy" character in this story. Though he was callous and rude to the Arab prisoner, in the end he will just return to his post and live a normal life. On the other hand, Daru was the only person to treat the Arab kindly, and yet he will most likely die for "handing him over."

Daru, who frees the prisoner, only frees the prisoner to go back to supporting a society similar to the one that Daru is trying to disassociate himself from.

Foreshadowing: Frequently throughout the short story, the reader is given hints about that trouble which might come to Daru. The author says that the village was beginning to stir, and that was the reason for the transportation of the prisoner. Also, Daru hears sounds of footsteps around the schoolhouse, but nothing or no one materializes.

== Title significance ==
Because the French title "L'Hôte" can be translated as meaning either host or guest, it works as an intentional pun that has a significant effect on the overall theme. Throughout the story, Daru acts as both the host and the guest. According to Camus scholar and biographer, Philip Thody, by giving the story the title of "The Host," emphasis is placed on Daru, as the European coloniser. He not only feeds the prisoner, but chooses to eat with him as well. He doesn't fear the prisoner, as he doesn't feel the need to protect himself and actually wants the prisoner to escape. However, by giving it the title of "The Guest," the meaning changes dramatically, as Daru is merely understood to be a European guest under the watchful gaze of an unseen enemy who views him as an outsider.

== Reception ==
In 1957, the same year that "The Guest" was published, Camus was acknowledged for his work by receiving the Nobel Prize in Literature. Anders Österling, the secretary of the Swedish Academy, notably attributed Camus' Algerian heritage as being fundamental to his many achievements. In his Nobel Prize acceptance speech, Camus specifically asked to be called a French Algerian, thereby refusing to choose one country over the other. Documentary filmmaker, Yazid Ait Mahieddine, claims Camus to be "the single reason people outside Algeria know about this country...He is our only ambassador." While he continues to be taught across the world, with "The Guest" being one of his most anthologized stories, Camus is still not celebrated within Algeria, with many of his books being hard to find.

While his influence has never truly gone away in France, in his native Algeria, Camus suffers far more scrutiny because according to Smithsonian contributor, Joshua Hammer, Camus "represents an Algeria that essentially is banished from the map, an Algeria of the pieds-noirs...It was a very segregated society, he really didn't know the Arab world." In fact, many, including Tunisian writer Albert Memmi, saw Camus as well-intentioned, if not a little misguided, in his attempt to refrain from choosing a side in the conflict but still saw him as a colonizer. These same criticisms that Camus struggled with during his lifetime, and still loom large over his legacy today, can be made against Daru who ends up alienating himself from both sides by refusing to stray from his own code of ethics, even at his personal expense.

== Film ==
David Oelhoffens film Far from Men (2014) is based on the short story. It stars Viggo Mortensen as Daru and Reda Kateb as the prisoner. The film played in competition at the 71st Venice International Film Festival, where it won three awards.
