= The Crisis of Man =

The Crisis of Man (original title in French: “La Crise de l’homme”) was a lecture delivered by Nobel Prize–winning author Albert Camus at Columbia University on March 28, 1946. The lecture focused on the moral decline of humanity and on how to promote peace.

The lecture was re-delivered 70 years later, at the same amphitheater, narrated by actor Viggo Mortensen.
