= Francine Faure =

Second wife of Albert Camus (1914–1979)

Francine Faure (6 December 1914 – 24 December 1979) was a French pianist specializing in Bach. She was also a mathematician. She was the second wife of Albert Camus, whom she met in 1937 in Algiers. They were married in Lyon on 3 December 1940. She came from a middle-class French family in Oran, Algeria, which was a French colony at the time. She also taught mathematics, sometimes as a substitute teacher.

== Personal life ==
Francine's father Fernand Martial François Faure died in World War I, at the Marne, where Camus' father had also died. Her mother, Marie-Fernande Charlotte "Fernande" Faure (née Albert), was considered by Camus biographer Olivier Todd to be domineering. Her grandfather had built part of the Oran harbour. Her maternal grandmother Clara Albert (née Touboul; 1868–1940) was a Berber Jew and was born in Oran to Fredj Touboul (also reported as Fredja Abitboul) and Messaouda Touboul (née Tabet; 1834–1890).

Although Camus was indifferent if not hostile to formal marriage, the couple had twins, Catherine and Jean Camus, in Paris in 1945 after the city's liberation. Francine had moved there from Algeria after two years' separation from Albert, who was participating in the French resistance at the time.

She was different from Camus' string of petites amies. Her beauty was striking, but her presence was reserved, unassuming, and gentle. And she had a cœur droit ('upright heart'), in the words of Camus.

Francine suffered from and was hospitalized for depression, for which insulin and electroshock therapy were at various times prescribed. At one point she attempted to throw herself from a balcony, whether to escape the hospital or to kill herself is not known. Her depression was blamed in part on her husband's infidelities, namely his affair with María Casares. Camus told Francine, "They think I'm the guilty one."

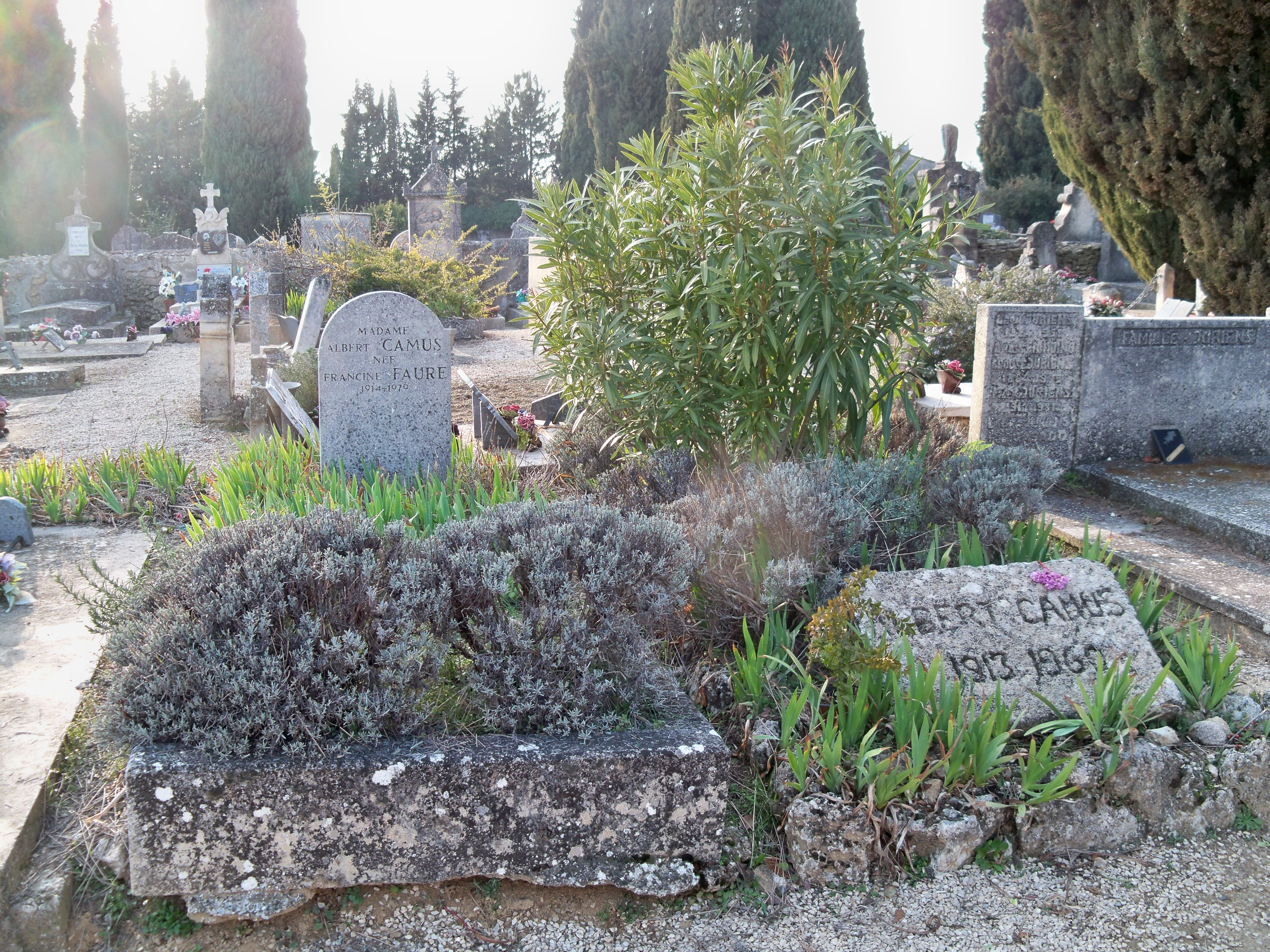
Graves of Francine Faure and Albert Camus.

Shortly after being awarded the Nobel Prize, Albert Camus mentioned in a letter to his cousin Nicole Chaperon how he was moved by the generosity of Francine, "whom I have never stopped loving in my bad way." In the same letter he said that Francine had "forgiven" him.

She and Camus are buried together in Lourmarin.
