= Notebooks 1942–1951 =

Book by Albert Camus

Notebooks 1942–1951 is a book by Albert Camus, published by Knopf in 1965. The book was published after the death of the Nobel awarded author, who died in 1960. The book contains the notes of Camus for the period 1942 to 1951. 2 more volumes of Camus notes were also published (Notebooks 1935–1942 and Notebooks 1951–1959). Notebooks provides an insight to Camus thought at the time he was creating the Rebel, The Plague and the Misunderstanding.
