= Christian Metaphysics and Neoplatonism =

Master thesis of Albert Camus

"Christian Metaphysics and Neoplatonism" (1936) is the title of Albert Camus' thesis that would obtain for him permission to teach in the secondary schools of France. It was published when Camus was 23 years old. Camus uses Augustine of Hippo and Pelagius to elaborate his moral views in regard to Greek thought and Christianity. This book is important as it is the first attempt of Camus to explore humanist ethics.

Although it has never been published separately, this text was included in his collected works from the fr:Bibliothèque de la Pléiade. An English translation under the hand of Ronald Srigley was published in 2007 by the University of Missouri.

== Environment and circumstances ==
Camus wrote his thesis in order to complete his studies at the University of Algiers. The thesis is a historical study, in which Camus attempts to elucidate the relationships between evangelical Christianity, the Greek philosophy of the first few centuries anno domini, and the dogmatic Christianism established by Augustine of Hippo. Camus knew how to read Latin (quotes from the work of Augustine are mostly in Latin), but knew very little of ancient Greek, and the Greek philosophers are quoted in French translations. As is required for such a dissertation, Camus not only had recourse to primary sources namely, Plotinus and Augustine, but he also studied and used studies of recent French authors, notably Émile Bréhier, Franz Cumont, Étienne Gilson, René Arnou, Pierre de Labriolle and Aimé Puech. Camus' bibliography also contains works written in English, such as The Philosophy of Plotinus by W. R. Inge. Camus had already read the Bible a few years before.
