= Resistance, Rebellion, and Death =

1969 essay collection by Albert Camus

- First US edition
- Author: Albert Camus
- Language: French
- Publisher: Alfred A. Knopf (US); Hamish Hamilton (UK)
- Publication date: 1961

Resistance, Rebellion, and Death (French: Lettres à un ami allemand, "Letters to a German Friend") is a 1960 collection of essays written by Albert Camus and selected by the author prior to his death that year. The 23 essays, articles, interviews, and lectures, constituting the book were selected by him. The book informs about conflicts near the Mediterranean, with an emphasis on the author's home country Algeria, and on the Algerian War of Independence in particular. He also criticizes capital punishment ("Reflections on the Guillotine") and totalitarianism in particular.

Camus proclaims the call to justice and the struggle for freedom also declaimed in the Old Testament, particularly the minor prophets. But he does so in a modern context, where God is silent and man is the master of his own destiny. Although he sees no messianic age, he proclaims the hope that by continuous effort, evil can be diminished and freedom and justice may become more prevalent.

Also collected here, in the essay "The Artist and His Time", is the address Camus gave in December 1957 at the University of Uppsala, entitled "Create Dangerously". The speech is reminiscent of Tolstoy's essay "What is Art?", in that Camus speaks of the social context of art, concluding that "the only justification [for the artist] ... is to speak up for those ... who cannot do so."
