= Algerian Chronicles =

1958 book by Albert Camus

- Author: Albert Camus
- Original title: Chroniques algériennes
- Publication date: 1958
- OCLC: 1745270

Algerian Chronicles (French: Chroniques algériennes) is a collection of writings by the Nobel laureate Albert Camus published in French in 1958. The book was translated into English and published as Algerian Chronicles in 2013. Albert Camus's neutrality in the Algerian Conflict is illustrated. The book also shows how both the French Right and the French Left were hostile to Camus because of this stance.
