= The Possessed (play) =

1959 play by Albert Camus

First English language edition (publ. Hamish Hamilton, 1960)

The Possessed (in French Les Possédés) is a three-part play written by Albert Camus in 1959. The piece is a theatrical adaptation of Fyodor Dostoyevsky's 1872 novel The Possessed, later renamed Demons. Camus despised nihilism and viewed Dostoyevsky's work as a prophecy about nihilism's devastating effects. He directed a production of the play at the Théâtre Antoine in 1959, the year before he died, which he financed in part with the money he received with his Nobel Prize. It was a critical success as well as an artistic and technical tour de force: 33 actors, 4 hours long, 7 sets, 24 scenes. The walls could move sideways to reduce the size of each location and the whole stage rotated to allow for immediate set transformations. Camus put the painter and set decorator Mayo, who had already illustrated several of his novels (L'Etranger - 1948 Ed.), in charge of the demanding task of designing these multiple and complex theater sets
