= Aziz Kessous =

French politician (1903–1965)

Mohamed El Aziz Kessous (June 25, 1903 – May 13, 1965) was a lawyer, journalist, senior civil servant, parliamentarian and equal rights activist in Algeria.

== Biography ==
He was born on June 25, 1903, in Constantinois and died in Paris May 13, 1965, following a long illness, three years after the independence of Algeria.

He studied at the Luciani high school in Philippeville (today Skikda), he was the fellow student of Ferhat Abbas, the first president of the Provisional Government of the Algerian Republic (GPRA), with whom he remained attached by close ties until 1956.
