= Reflections on the Guillotine =

1957 essay by Albert Camus

"Reflections on the Guillotine" (French: Réflexions sur la guillotine) is an extended essay written in 1957 by Albert Camus. In the essay Camus takes an uncompromising position for the abolition of the death penalty. Camus's view is similar to that of Cesare Beccaria and the Marquis de Sade, the latter having also argued that murder premeditated and carried out by the state was the worst kind. Camus states that he does not base his argument on sympathy for the convicted but on logical grounds and on proven statistics. Camus also argues that capital punishment is an easy option for the government where remedy and reform may be possible.

== Analysis of the text ==
=== Opening ===
The essay opens with a description of Camus's father's reaction to witnessing the execution of a convicted murderer. At first Camus's father fully supported the decision, but after witnessing the event he was left in a state of shock for several days. Throughout the essay Camus expresses his own shock and disgust at the brutality of the guillotine. Camus also quotes from several sources where the guillotine had been less than ‘humane and instant’ as it was claimed to be and uses this in his argument for its discontinuation.

=== Body ===
Camus's main point in his argument against capital punishment is its ineffectiveness. Camus points out that in countries where the death penalty has already been abandoned crime has not risen. He explains this by arguing that the world has changed so that capital punishment no longer serves as the deterrent that it may once have been. In Camus's father's day the guillotine was still used to execute criminals in public but by the time Camus wrote his essay executions took place privately in prisons. Although Camus approved of conducting the executions in private he argued that it removed the element of deterrence and rendered the death penalty as merely a means for the state to dispose of those whom it saw as irremediable.

Camus also argued that the threat of death is insufficient to prevent people from committing crimes as death is the common fate shared by all, regardless of guilt. He also believed that because most murders are not premeditated no deterrent can be effective and in the case of premeditated murder the deterrent would be insufficient to stop those who have already decided to act.

Without serving a purpose Camus argued that capital punishment is reduced to an act of revenge that only breeds further violence, fueled only by sadism and perpetuated by tradition. He likened this act of state revenge to the concept of an eye for an eye and stated that justice should be based on law and principles and not instinct and emotions.

Although Camus opposed the use of capital punishment today, he gives examples in the essay of how it may have been logical and appropriate in pious civilizations. In such civilizations Camus states that the death penalty was usually administered by the Church in order to deprive the convicted of the divine gift of life. However, by doing so, the convicted would then face judgement and have the chance of atonement at the hands of God. In an unbelieving world, Camus argues, the convicted is given no chance of atonement. The process takes place completely separate from the convict and simply dismisses him as beyond salvation or remedy.

Camus also stated that in an unbelieving world there is no absolute authority capable of delivering judgement as no man possesses absolute innocence himself. Because of this Camus suggested that the maximum penalty should be being set at labor for life due to the possibility of judicial error, a life of labor in Camus's opinion being harsher than death but at least carrying the possibility of being reversed. The convicted would then also always have the option of choosing death via suicide.

Camus also argued that capital punishment was inappropriate because by effecting revenge for grievances it simultaneously hurts the family and loved ones of the convict in the same manner as those being avenged were hurt by the initial crime.

"Capital punishment is the most premeditated of murders, to which no criminal’s deed, however calculated, can be compared. For there to be an equivalency, the death penalty would have to punish a criminal who had warned his victim of the date on which he would inflict a horrible death on him and who, from that moment onward, had confined him at his mercy for months. Such a monster is not to be encountered in private life."

=== Author's suggestions for the future ===
Camus suggested that instead of effecting capital punishment as a cure for the problem the French government would do better to improve living conditions and prohibit alcohol which Camus claimed was directly linked and responsible for many of the murders which led to use of capital punishment in France.

At the end of the essay Camus stated that action must be taken immediately. Camus proposed that France lead the way for the rest of the world by adopting a trial period of ten years in which capital punishment be replaced with labor for life. As a half-measure Camus suggested that the option of self-administered lethal injection (a modern equivalent of hemlock in Ancient Greece) would at least be a first step in a more humane direction.

In 1981 the death penalty was abolished in France, the last execution having taken place four years earlier in Marseille.

== See also ==
- Dead Man Walking
