= Nuptials (essays) =

Works by Albert Camus

Noces
- Author: Albert Camus
- Language: French
- Publication date: 1938
- Publication place: France

Nuptials (Noces) is a collection of four lyrical essays by Albert Camus. It is one of his earliest works, and the first dealing with the absurd and suicide. Camus examines religious hope, rejects religions and life after death. Instead, he advocates for living for now. The collection contains the following essays:

- "Noces à Tipasa"
- "Le vent à Djémila"
- "L'été à Alger" ("Summer in Algiers")
- "Le désert"

"Noces à Tipasa" is the best known essay.

"L'été à Alger" is dedicated to Jacques Heurgon. In it, Camus reflects on life in Algiers during the summer, with the sea and the sun, and how even those living in poverty can feel fulfilled. He concludes with one of his core philosophies: "If there is a sin against life, it consists not so much in despairing as in hoping for another life and in eluding the implacable grandeur of this one."
