= Notebooks 1935–1942 =

Notebooks 1935–1942 (1963) is the first of three translated post-mortem editions of the notebooks of Albert Camus. It was translated and edited by Philip Thody, and published by Knopf, New York.

The notebooks include aphorisms and other ideas relating to Camus' literary work, and examine themes such as humanism and revolt. Few biographical details are included.
