= Albert Camus =

French philosopher and writer (1913–1960)

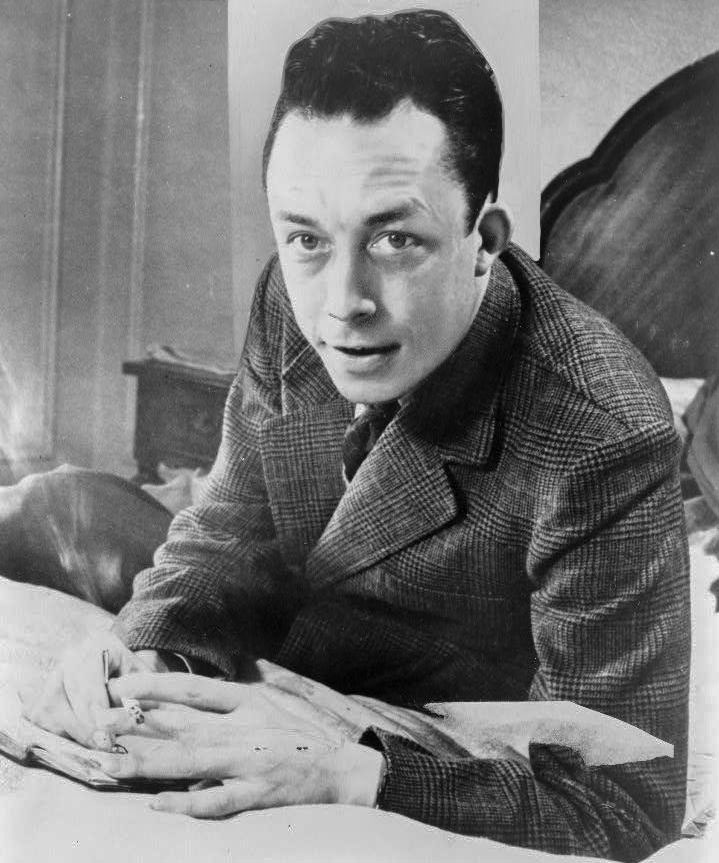
- A portrait from the New York World-Telegram and The Sun Photograph Collection, 1957
- Born: 7 November 1913; Mondovi, French Algeria
- Died: 4 January 1960 (aged 46); Villeblevin, France
- Spouses: Simone Hié (m. 1934; div. 1936); Francine Faure (m. 1940)
- Awards: Nobel Prize in Literature (1957)

Education
- Education: University of Algiers
- Academic advisor: Jean Grenier

Philosophical work
- Region: Western philosophy
- School: Continental philosophy; Absurdism; Existentialism; French Nietzscheanism; Syndicalist anarchism
- Main interests: Ethics, human nature, justice, politics, philosophy of suicide
- Notable works: The Stranger / The Outsider; The Myth of Sisyphus; The Rebel; The Plague
- Notable ideas: Absurdism

Albert Camus (/kæˈmuː/ kam-OO; French: [albɛʁ kamy]; 7 November 1913 – 4 January 1960) was a French philosopher, writer, and political activist. He was the recipient of the 1957 Nobel Prize in Literature at the age of 44, the second-youngest recipient in history, and the first laureate in literature born in Africa. His works include The Stranger, The Plague, The Myth of Sisyphus, The Fall and The Rebel.

Camus was born in French Algeria to pied-noir parents. He spent his childhood in a poor neighbourhood and later studied philosophy at the University of Algiers. He was in Paris when the Germans invaded France during World War II in 1940. Camus tried to flee but finally joined the French Resistance where he served as editor-in-chief at Combat, an outlawed newspaper. After the war, he was a celebrity figure and gave many lectures around the world.

He married twice but had many extramarital affairs. Camus was politically active; he was part of the left that opposed Joseph Stalin and the Soviet Union because of their totalitarianism. Camus was a moralist and leaned towards anarcho-syndicalism. He was part of many organisations seeking European integration. During the Algerian War (1954–1962), he kept a neutral stance, advocating a multicultural and pluralistic Algeria, a position that was rejected by most parties.

Philosophically, Camus's views contributed to the rise of the philosophy known as absurdism. Some consider Camus's work to show him to be an existentialist, even though he himself firmly rejected the term throughout his lifetime.

== Biography ==
=== Early years and education ===
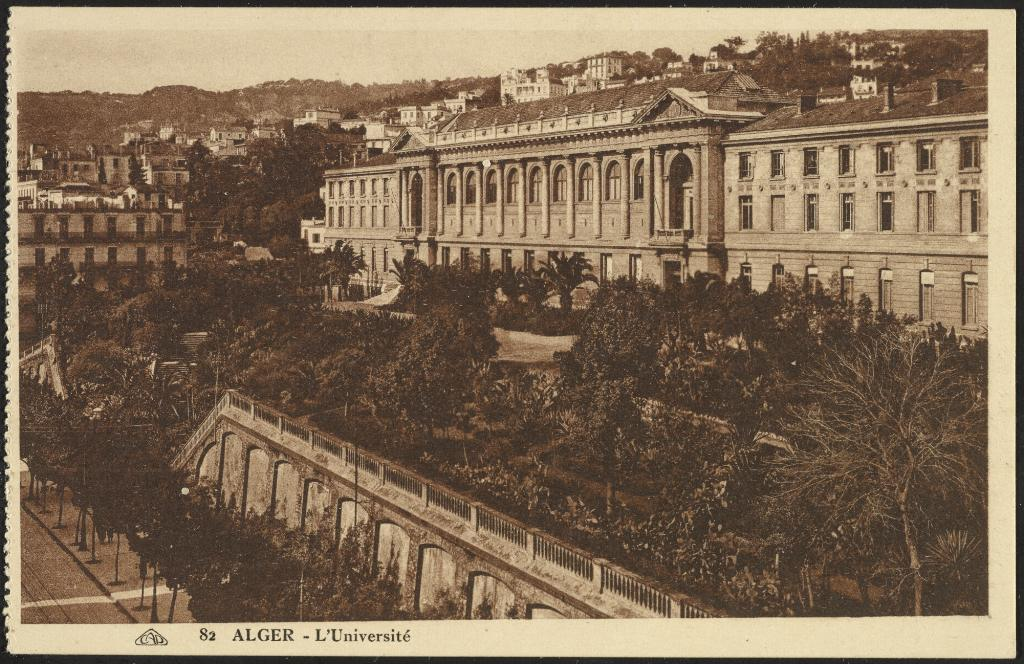
A 20th-century postcard of the University of Algiers

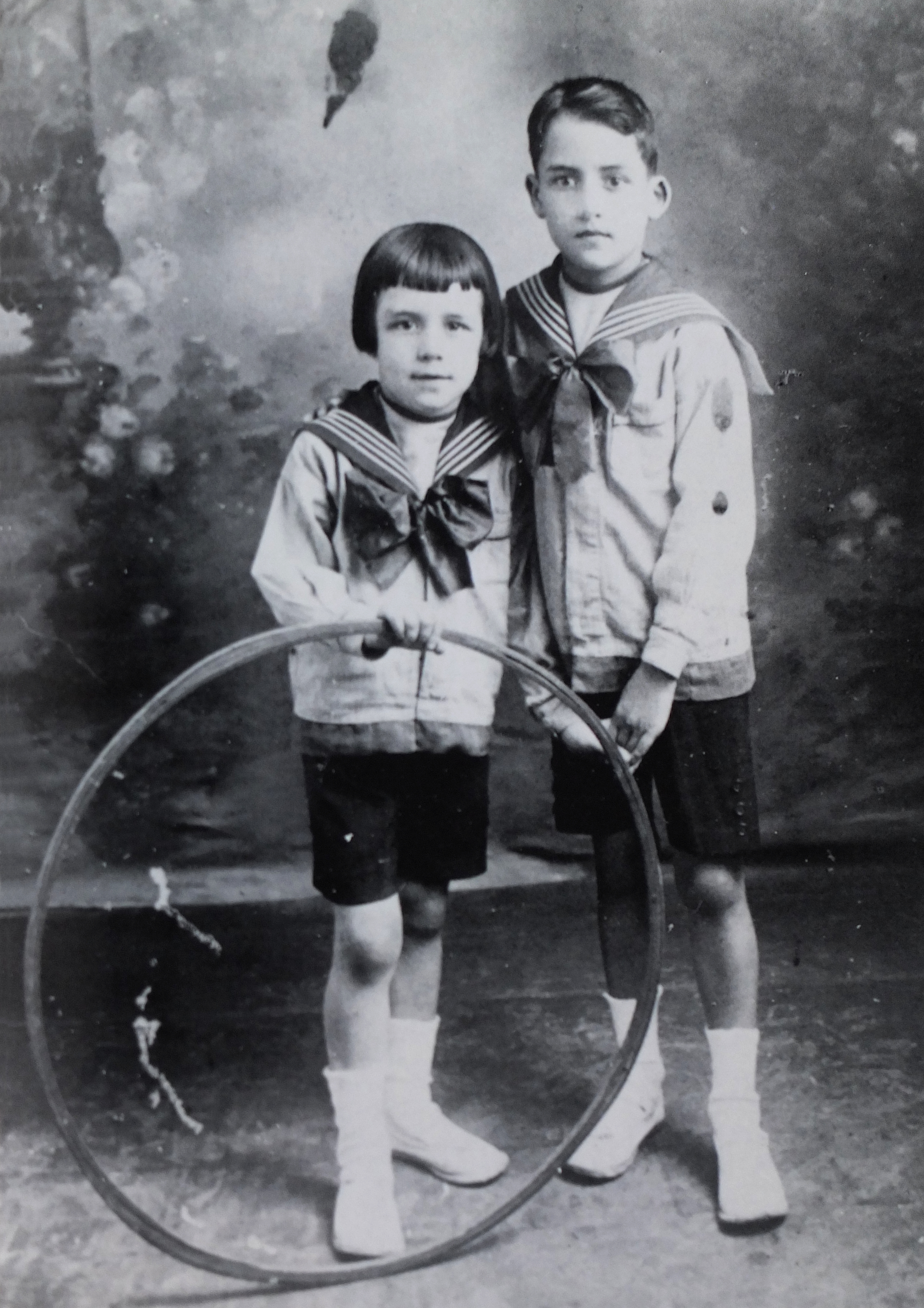
Albert Camus in 1920 with his brother Lucien

Albert Camus was born on 7 November 1913 in a working-class neighbourhood in Mondovi (present-day Dréan), in French Algeria. His mother, Catherine Hélène Camus (née Sintès), was French with Balearic Spanish ancestry. She was deaf and illiterate. He never knew his father, Lucien Camus, a poor French agricultural worker killed in action while serving with a Zouave regiment in October 1914 during World War I. Camus, his mother, and other relatives lived without many basic material possessions during his childhood in the Belcourt section of Algiers.

Camus was a second-generation French inhabitant of Algeria, which was a French territory from 1830 until 1962. His paternal grandfather, along with many others of his generation, had moved to Algeria for a better life during the first decades of the 19th century. Hence, he was called a pied-noir – a slang term for people of French and other European descent born in Algeria. His identity and poor background had a substantial effect on his later life and beliefs. Nevertheless, Camus was a French citizen and enjoyed more rights than Arab and Berber Algerians under indigénat. During his childhood, he developed a love for football and swimming.

Under the influence of his teacher Louis Germain, Camus gained a scholarship in 1924 to continue his studies at a prestigious lyceum (secondary school) near Algiers. Germain immediately noticed his lively intelligence and his desire to learn. In middle school, he gave Camus free lessons to prepare him for the 1924 scholarship competition – despite the fact that his grandmother had a plan for him to be a manual worker so that he could immediately contribute to the maintenance of the family. Camus maintained great gratitude and affection towards Germain throughout his life and dedicated his speech for accepting the Nobel Prize to him. Having received the news of the awarding of the prize, he wrote:

But when I heard the news, my first thought, after my mother, was of you. Without you, without the affectionate hand you extended to the small poor child that I was, without your teaching and example, none of all this would have happened.

In a letter dated 30 April 1959, Germain lovingly reciprocated the warm feelings towards his former pupil, calling him "my little Camus".

Camus played as goalkeeper for the Racing Universitaire d'Alger junior team from 1928 to 1930. The sense of team spirit, fraternity, and common purpose appealed to him enormously. In match reports, he was often praised for playing with passion and courage. Any football ambitions, however, disappeared when he contracted tuberculosis. Camus later drew parallels between football, human existence, morality, and personal identity. For him, the simplistic morality of football contradicted the complicated morality imposed by authorities such as the state and church.

In 1930, at the age of 17, Camus was diagnosed with tuberculosis. Because it is a transmitted disease, he moved out of his home and stayed with his uncle Gustave Acault, a butcher, who influenced the young Camus. It was at that time he turned to philosophy, with the mentoring of his philosophy teacher Jean Grenier. He was impressed by ancient Greek philosophers and Friedrich Nietzsche. During that time, he was only able to study part time. To earn money, he took odd jobs, including as a private tutor, car parts clerk, and assistant at the Meteorological Institute.

In 1933, Camus enrolled at the University of Algiers and completed his licence de philosophie (BA) in 1936 after presenting his thesis on Plotinus. Camus developed an interest in early Christian philosophers, but Nietzsche and Arthur Schopenhauer had paved the way towards pessimism and atheism. Camus also studied novelist-philosophers such as Stendhal, Herman Melville, Fyodor Dostoyevsky, and Franz Kafka. That same year he met Simone Hié, then a partner of Camus's friend, who later became his first wife.

=== Formative years ===
Camus joined the French Communist Party (PCF) in early 1935. He saw it as a way to "fight inequalities between Europeans and 'natives' in Algeria", even though he was not a Marxist. He explained: "We might see communism as a springboard and asceticism that prepares the ground for more spiritual activities." Camus left the PCF a year later. In 1936, the independence-minded Algerian Communist Party (PCA) was founded, and Camus joined it after his mentor Grenier advised him to do so. Camus's main role within the PCA was to organise the Théâtre du Travail ('Workers' Theatre').

Camus was also close to the Parti du Peuple Algérien (Algerian People's Party [PPA]), which was a moderate anti-colonialist/nationalist party. As tensions in the interwar period escalated, the Stalinist PCA and PPA broke ties. Camus was expelled from the PCA for refusing to toe the party line. This series of events sharpened his belief in human dignity. Camus's mistrust of bureaucracies that aimed for efficiency instead of justice grew. He continued his involvement with theatre and renamed his group Théâtre de l'Equipe ('Theatre of the Team'). Some of his scripts were the basis for his later novels.

In 1938, Camus began working for the leftist newspaper Alger républicain (founded by Pascal Pia), as he had strong anti-fascist feelings, and the rise of fascist regimes in Europe was worrying him. By then, Camus had also developed strong feelings against authoritarian colonialism as he witnessed the harsh treatment of the Arabs and Berbers by French authorities. Alger républicain was banned in 1940 and Camus flew to Paris to take a new job at Paris-Soir as layout editor. In Paris, he almost completed his "first cycle" of works dealing with the absurd and the meaningless: the novel L'Étranger (The Outsider [UK] or The Stranger [US]), the philosophical essay Le Mythe de Sisyphe (The Myth of Sisyphus), and the play Caligula. Each cycle consisted of a novel, an essay, and a theatrical play.

=== World War II, Resistance and Combat ===
Soon after Camus moved to Paris, the outbreak of World War II began to affect France. Camus volunteered to join the army but was not accepted because he had once had tuberculosis. As the Germans were marching towards Paris, Camus fled. He was laid off from Paris-Soir and ended up in Lyon. Camus and Faure moved back to Algeria (Oran), where he taught in primary schools.

Because of his tuberculosis, he moved to the French Alps on medical advice. There he began writing his second cycle of works, this time dealing with revolt – a novel, La Peste (The Plague), and a play, Le Malentendu (The Misunderstanding). By 1943 he was known because of his earlier work. He returned to Paris, where he met and became friends with Jean-Paul Sartre. He also became part of a circle of intellectuals, which included Simone de Beauvoir and André Breton. Among them was the actress María Casares, who later had an affair with Camus.

Camus took an active role in the underground resistance movement against the Germans during the French Occupation. Upon his arrival in Paris, he started working as a journalist and editor of the banned newspaper Combat. Camus used a pseudonym for his Combat articles and used false ID cards to avoid being captured. He continued writing for the paper after the liberation of France, composing almost daily editorials under his real name. During that period he composed four Lettres à un Ami Allemand ('Letters to a German Friend'), explaining why resistance was necessary.

=== Post–World War II ===
External videos
- Presentation by Olivier Todd on Albert Camus: A Life, 15 December 1997, C-SPAN

Camus was now a celebrated writer known for his role in the Resistance. He gave lectures at various universities in the United States and Latin America during two separate trips. He also visited Algeria once more, only to leave disappointed by the continued oppressive colonial policies, which he had warned about many times. During this period he completed the second cycle of his work, with the book L'Homme révolté (The Rebel). Camus attacked totalitarian communism while advocating libertarian socialism and anarcho-syndicalism. Upsetting many of his colleagues and contemporaries in France with its rejection of communism, the book brought about the final split between Camus and Sartre. His relations with the Marxist Left deteriorated further during the Algerian War.

Camus was a strong supporter of European integration in various marginal organisations working towards that end. In 1944, he founded the Comité français pour la féderation européenne ('French Committee for the European Federation' [CFFE]), declaring that Europe "can only evolve along the path of economic progress, democracy, and peace if the nation-states become a federation." In 1947–48, he founded the Groupes de Liaison Internationale (GLI), a trade union movement in the context of revolutionary syndicalism (syndicalisme révolutionnaire). His main aim was to express the positive side of surrealism and existentialism, rejecting the negativity and the nihilism of André Breton. Camus also raised his voice against the Soviet invasion of Hungary and the totalitarian tendencies of Franco's regime in Spain.

In 1957, Camus received the news that he was to be awarded the Nobel Prize in Literature. This came as a surprise to him; he "thought that the Nobel Prize...should crown an already completed life's work or at least one more advanced than mine", like André Malraux. At age 44, he was the second-youngest recipient of the prize, after Rudyard Kipling, who was 41. After this he began working on his autobiography Le Premier Homme (The First Man) in an attempt to examine "moral learning". He also turned to the theatre once more. Financed by the money he received with his Nobel Prize, he adapted and directed for the stage Dostoyevsky's novel Demons. The play opened in January 1959 at the Antoine Theatre in Paris and was a critical success.

During these years, he published posthumously the works of the philosopher Simone Weil, in the series "Espoir" ('Hope') which he had founded for Éditions Gallimard. Weil had great influence on his philosophy, since he saw her writings as an "antidote" to nihilism. Camus described her as "the only great spirit of our times".

=== Literary career ===
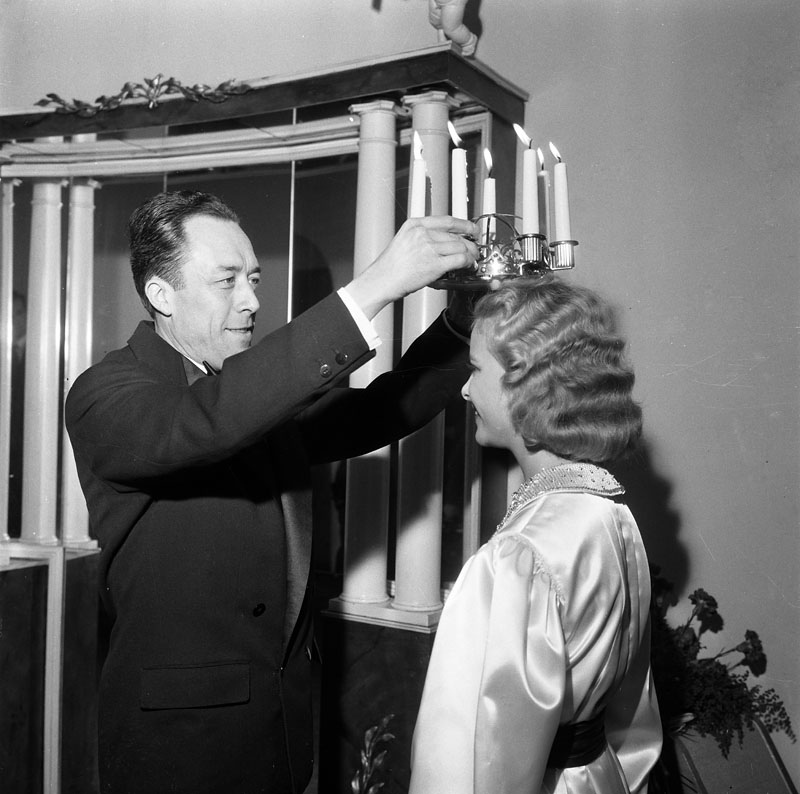
Camus crowning Stockholm's Lucia on 13 December 1957, three days after accepting the Nobel Prize in Literature

Camus's first publication was a play called Révolte dans les Asturies (Revolt in Asturias), written with three friends in May 1936. The subject was the 1934 revolt by Spanish miners that was brutally suppressed by the Spanish government, resulting in 1,500 to 2,000 deaths. In May 1937 he wrote his first book, L'Envers et l'Endroit (Betwixt and Between, also translated as The Wrong Side and the Right Side). Both were published by Edmond Charlot's small publishing house.

Camus separated his work into three cycles. Each cycle consisted of a novel, an essay, and a play. The first was the cycle of the absurd consisting of L'Étranger, Le Mythe de Sysiphe, and Caligula. The second was the cycle of the revolt which included La Peste (The Plague), L'Homme révolté (The Rebel), and Les Justes (The Just Assassins). The third, the cycle of the love, consisted of Nemesis. Each cycle was an examination of a theme with the use of a pagan myth and including biblical motifs.

The books in the first cycle were published between 1942 and 1944, but the theme was conceived earlier, at least as far back as 1936. With this cycle, Camus aimed to pose a question on the human condition, discuss the world as an absurd place, and warn humanity of the consequences of totalitarianism.

In the last months of 1942, Camus began his work on the second cycle while he was in Algeria, just as the Germans were reaching North Africa. In the second cycle, Camus used Prometheus, who is depicted as a revolutionary humanist, to highlight the nuances between revolution and rebellion. He analyses aspects of rebellion, its metaphysics, and its connection to politics, and then examines it under the lens of modernity, historicity, and the absence of a God.

After receiving the Nobel Prize, Camus gathered, clarified, and published his pacifist leaning views at Actuelles III: Chronique algérienne 1939–1958 (Algerian Chronicles). He then decided to distance himself from the Algerian War as he found the mental burden too heavy. He turned to theatre and the third cycle which was about love and the goddess Nemesis, the Greek and Roman goddess of Revenge.

Two of Camus's works were published posthumously. The first entitled La mort heureuse (A Happy Death) (1971) is a novel that was written between 1936 and 1938. It features a character named Patrice Mersault, comparable to The Stranger's Meursault. There is scholarly debate about the relationship between the two books. The second was an unfinished novel, Le Premier homme (The First Man, published in 1994), which Camus was writing before he died. It was an autobiographical work about his childhood in Algeria and its publication in 1994 sparked a widespread reconsideration of Camus's allegedly unrepentant colonialism.

Works of Camus by genre and cycle, according to Matthew Sharpe
| Years | Pagan myth | Biblical motif | Novel | Plays |
|---|---|---|---|---|
| 1937–42 | Sisyphus | Alienation, exile | The Stranger (L'Étranger) | Caligula, The Misunderstanding (Le Malentendu) |
| 1943–52 | Prometheus | Rebellion | The Plague (La Peste) | The State of Siege (L'État de siège); The Just (Les Justes) |
| 1952–58 | | Guilt, the fall; exile & the kingdom; John the Baptist, Christ | The Fall (La Chute) | Adaptations of The Possessed (Dostoevsky); Faulkner's Requiem for a Nun |
| 1958– | Nemesis | The Kingdom | The First Man (Le Premier Homme) | |

=== Death ===
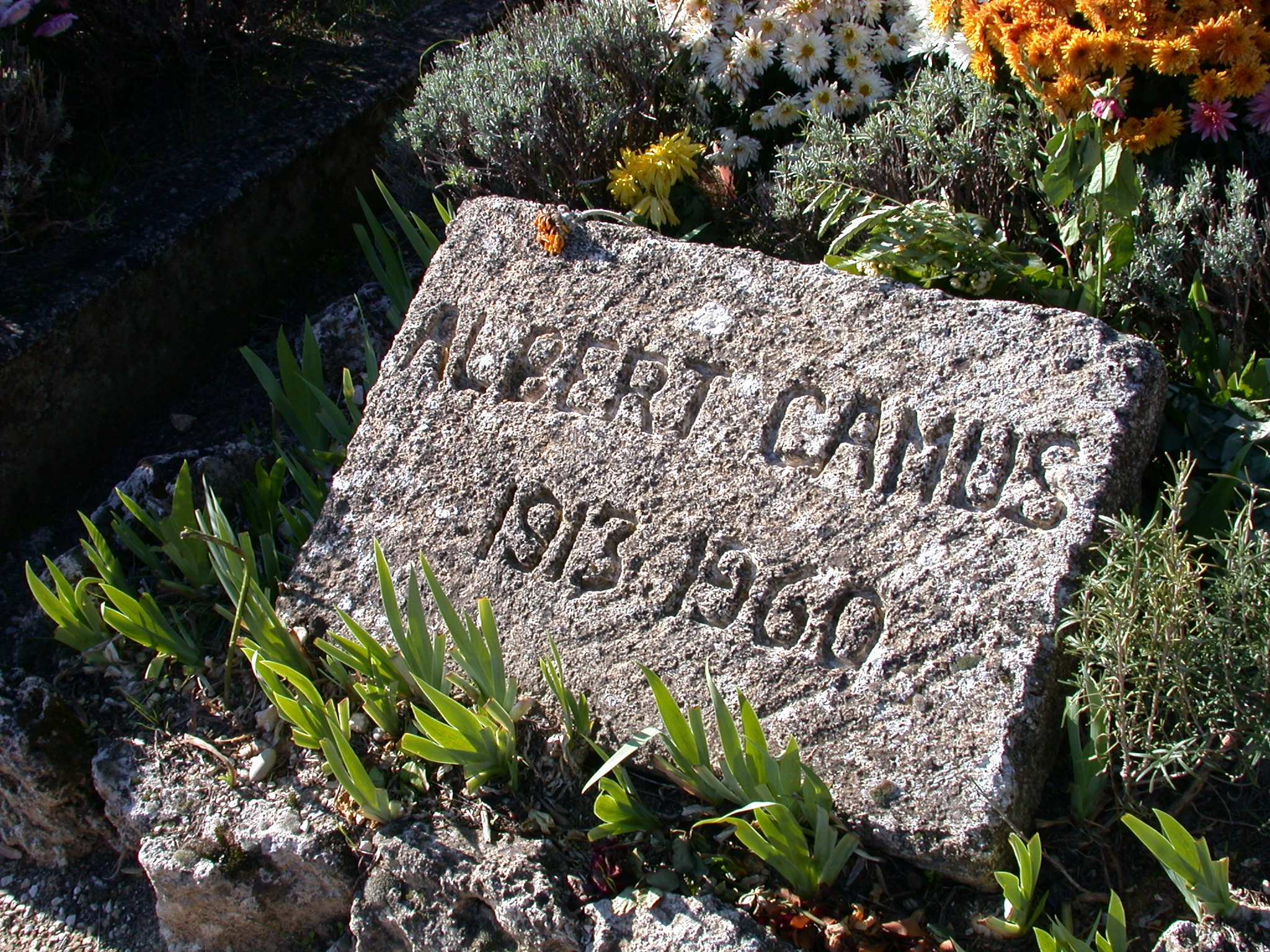
Albert Camus's gravestone

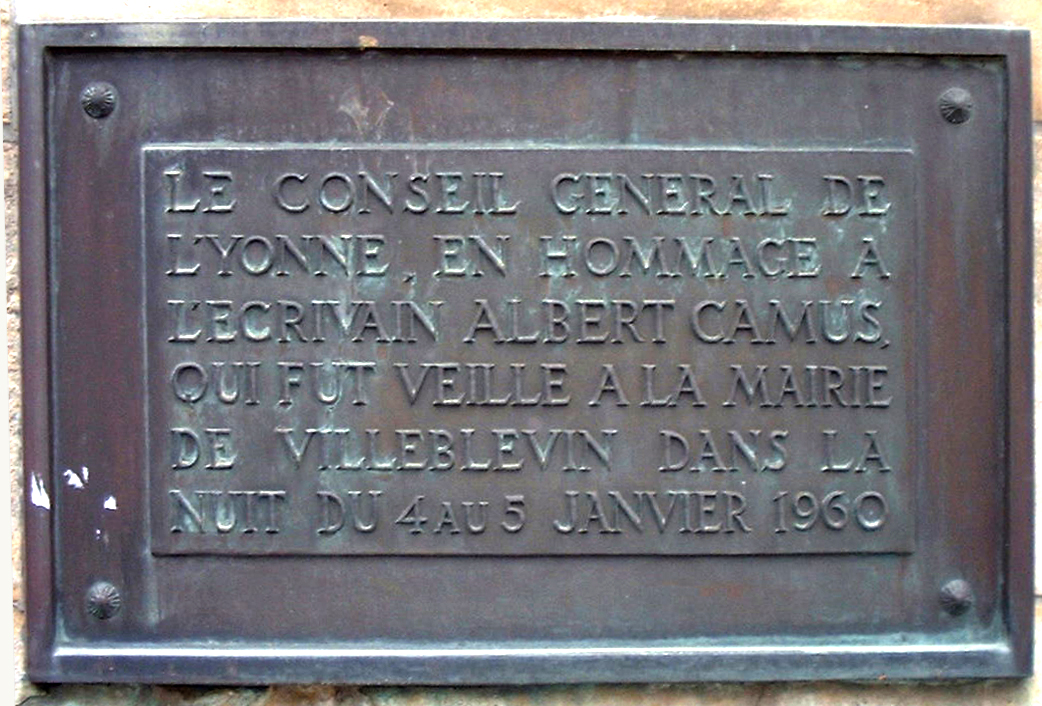
The bronze plaque on the monument to Camus in the town of Villeblevin, France. It reads: "From the General Council of the Yonne Department, in homage to the writer Albert Camus whose remains lay in vigil at the Villeblevin town hall on the night of 4 to 5 January 1960"

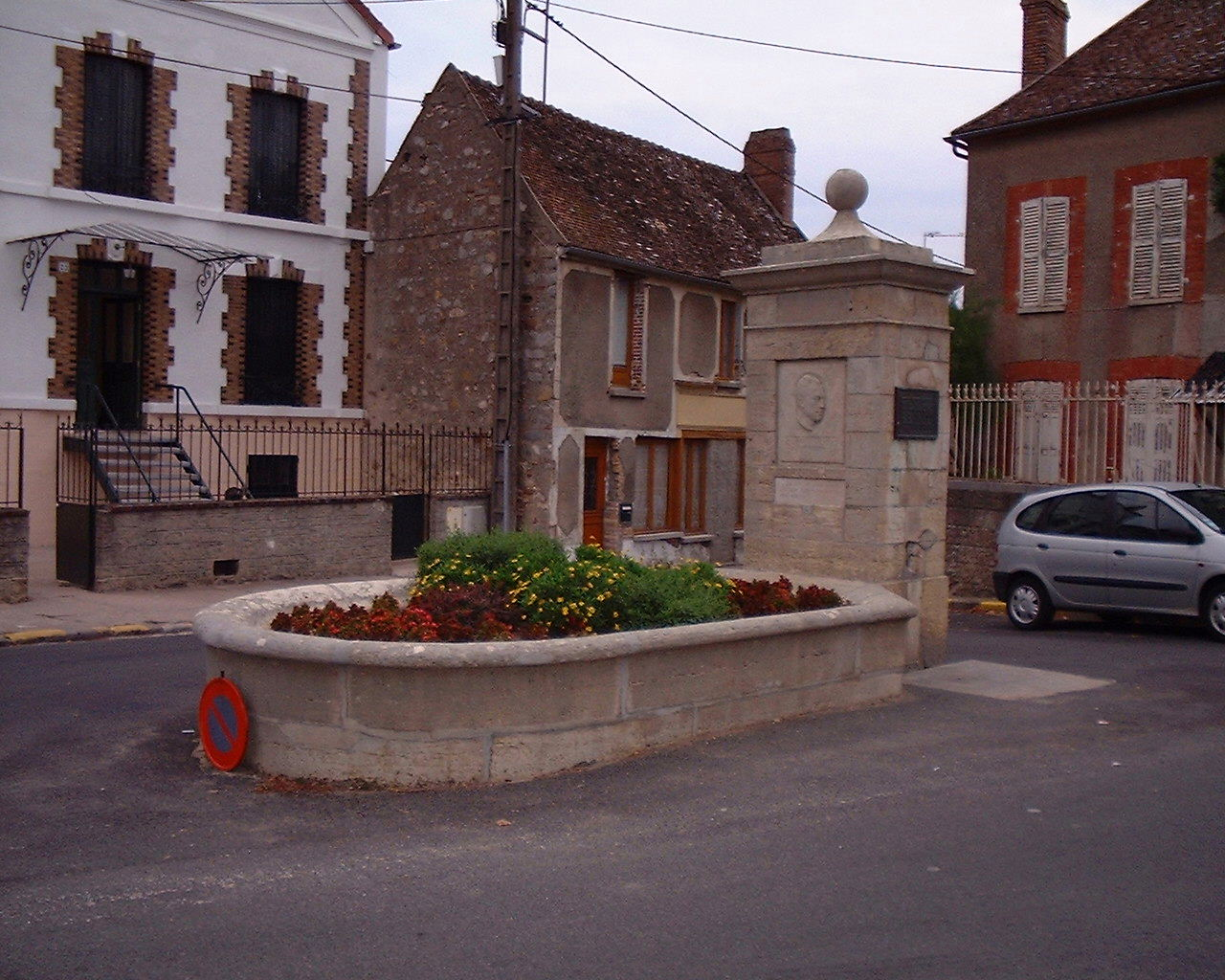
A monument to Camus in Villeblevin, where he died in a car crash on 4 January 1960

Camus died on 4 January 1960 at the age of 46, in a car crash near Sens, in Le Grand Fossard in the small town of Villeblevin. He had spent the New Year's holiday of 1960 at his house in Lourmarin, Vaucluse with his family and his publisher Michel Gallimard of Éditions Gallimard, along with Gallimard's wife, Janine, and daughter, Anne. Camus's wife and children went back to Paris by train on 2 January, but Camus decided to return in Gallimard's luxurious Facel Vega FV2.

The car crashed into a plane tree on a long straight stretch of the Route nationale 5 (now the RN 6 or D606). Camus, who was in the passenger seat, died instantly. Gallimard died five days later. Janine and Anne Gallimard were not injured.

In 2011, Italian author Giovanni Catelli argued that Camus might have been killed by the KGB for criticizing the Soviet Union. In 2013, Catelli published a book on the subject. An English translation of it was published in 2020.

A handwritten manuscript of 144 pages, entitled Le premier Homme, published in English translation as The First Man, was found in the wreckage. Camus had predicted that this unfinished novel based on his childhood in Algeria would be his finest work. Camus was buried in the Lourmarin cemetery, Vaucluse, France, where he had lived. Jean-Paul Sartre read a eulogy, paying tribute to Camus's heroic "stubborn humanism". William Faulkner wrote his obituary, saying, "When the door shut for him he had already written on this side of it that which every artist who also carries through life with him that one same foreknowledge and hatred of death is hoping to do: I was here."

== Philosophy ==
=== Existentialism ===
Even though Camus is mostly connected to absurdism, he is routinely categorized as an existentialist, a term he rejected on several occasions.

Camus himself said his philosophical origins lay in ancient Greek philosophy, Nietzsche, and 17th-century moralists, whereas existentialism arose from 19th- and early 20th-century philosophy such as Søren Kierkegaard, Karl Jaspers, and Martin Heidegger. He also said his work, The Myth of Sisyphus, was a criticism of various aspects of existentialism. Camus rejected existentialism as a philosophy, but his critique was mostly focused on Sartrean existentialism and – though to a lesser extent – on religious existentialism. He thought that the importance of history held by Marx and Sartre was incompatible with his belief in human freedom. David Sherman and others also suggest the rivalry between Sartre and Camus also played a part in his rejection of existentialism. David Simpson argues further that his humanism and belief in human nature set him apart from the existentialist doctrine that existence precedes essence.

On the other hand, Camus focused most of his philosophy around existential questions. The absurdity of life and that it inevitably ends in death is highlighted in his acts. His belief was that the absurd – life being void of meaning, or man's inability to know that meaning if it were to exist – was something that man should embrace. His opposition to Christianity and his commitment to individual moral freedom and responsibility are only a few of the similarities with other existential writers. Camus addressed one of the fundamental questions of existentialism: the problem of suicide. He wrote: "There is only one really serious philosophical question, and that is suicide." Camus viewed the question of suicide as arising naturally as a solution to the absurdity of life.

=== Absurdism ===
Many existentialist writers have addressed the Absurd, each with their own interpretation of what it is and what makes it important. Kierkegaard suggests that the absurdity of religious truths prevents people from reaching God rationally. Sartre recognizes the absurdity of individual experience. Camus's thoughts on the Absurd begin with his first cycle of books and the literary essay The Myth of Sisyphus, his major work on the subject. In 1942, he published the story of a man living an absurd life in The Stranger. He also wrote a play about the Roman emperor Caligula, pursuing an absurd logic, which was performed in 1945.

In 1937, his early thoughts appeared in his first collection of essays, Betwixt and Between, in 1937. Absurd themes were expressed with more sophistication in his second collection of essays, Noces (Nuptials) in 1938. In these essays, Camus reflects on the experience of the Absurd. Aspects of the notion of the Absurd can also be found in The Plague.

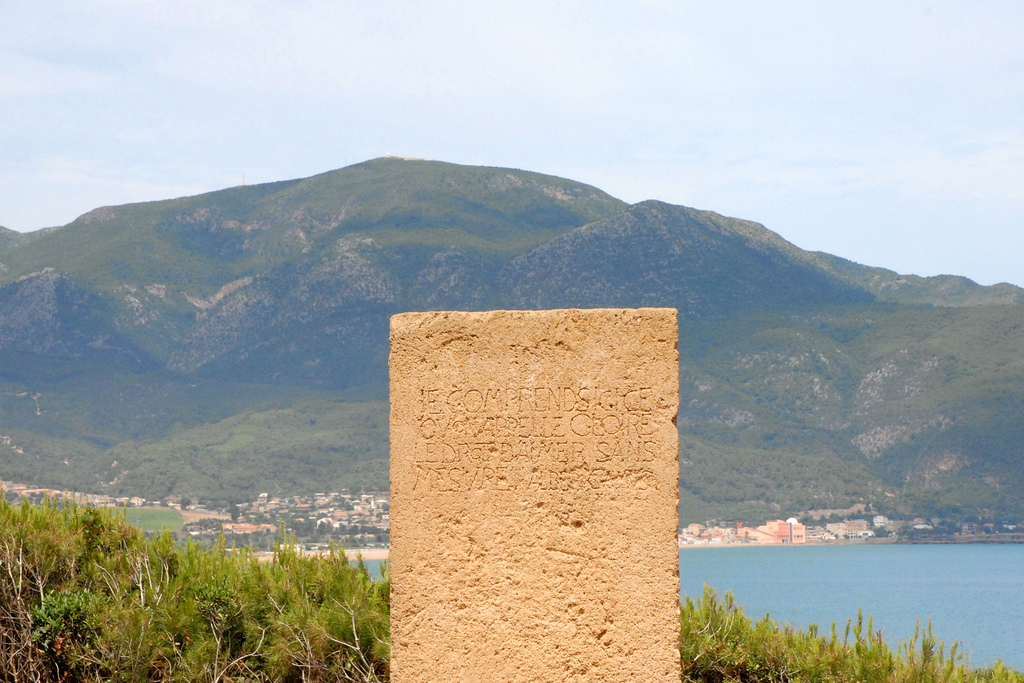
A stele made in Tipaza in 1961 by the French painter Louis Bénist, on which is engraved an extract from Nuptials: "Here, I understand the concept of glory: the freedom to love boundlessly."

Camus follows Sartre's definition of the Absurd: "That which is meaningless. Thus man's existence is absurd because his contingency finds no external justification". The Absurd is created because man, who is placed in an unintelligent universe, realises that human values are not founded on a solid external component; as Camus himself explains, the Absurd is the result of the "confrontation between human need and the unreasonable silence of the world". Even though absurdity is inescapable, Camus does not drift towards nihilism. But the realization of absurdity leads to the question: Why should someone continue to live? Suicide is an option that Camus firmly dismisses as the renunciation of human values and freedom. Rather, he proposes we accept that absurdity is a part of our lives and live with it.

Camus regretted the continued reference to himself as a "philosopher of the absurd". He showed less interest in the Absurd shortly after publishing The Myth of Sisyphus. To distinguish his ideas, scholars sometimes refer to the Paradox of the Absurd, when referring to "Camus's Absurd".

=== Revolt ===
Camus articulated the case for revolting against any kind of oppression, injustice, or whatever disrespects the human condition. He was cautious enough, however, to set the limits on the rebellion. The Rebel explains in detail his thoughts on the issue. There, he builds upon the absurd, described in The Myth of Sisyphus, but goes further. In the introduction, where he examines the metaphysics of rebellion, he concludes with the phrase "I revolt, therefore we exist" implying the recognition of a common human condition.

Camus also delineates the difference between revolution and rebellion and notices that history has shown that the rebel's revolution might easily end up as an oppressive regime; he therefore places importance on the morals accompanying the revolution. Camus poses a crucial question: Is it possible for humans to act in an ethical and meaningful manner in a silent universe? According to him, the answer is yes, as the experience and awareness of the Absurd creates the moral values and also sets the limits of our actions.

Camus separates the modern form of rebellion into two modes. First, there is the metaphysical rebellion, which is "the movement by which man protests against his condition and against the whole of creation". The other mode, historical rebellion, is the attempt to materialize the abstract spirit of metaphysical rebellion and change the world. In this attempt, the rebel must balance between the evil of the world and the intrinsic evil which every revolt carries, and not cause any unjustifiable suffering.

== Legacy ==
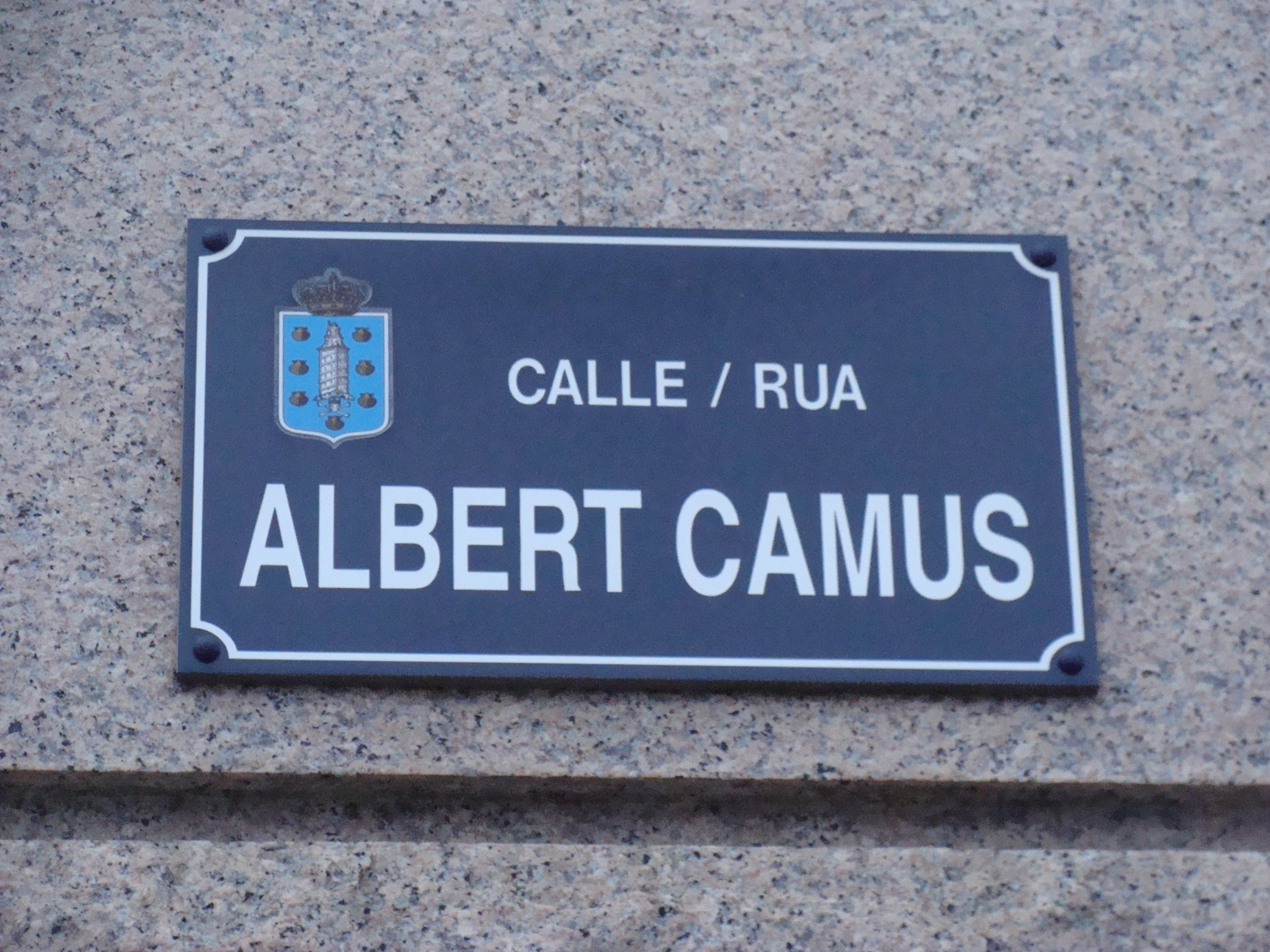
Albert Camus street in La Coruña, Galicia, Spain

Camus's novels and philosophical essays are still influential. After his death, interest in Camus followed the rise – and diminution – of the New Left. Following the collapse of the Soviet Union, interest in his alternative road to communism resurfaced. He is remembered for his skeptical humanism and his support for political tolerance, dialogue, and civil rights.

Although Camus has been linked to anti-Soviet communism, reaching as far as anarcho-syndicalism, some neoliberals have tried to associate him with their policies; for instance, the French president Nicolas Sarkozy suggested that his remains be moved to the Panthéon, an idea that was criticised by Camus's surviving family and angered many on the Left.

In 2012, Michel Onfray published the book L'Ordre libertaire where he contrasted Camus with Sartre, praising the former as hedonistic, libertarian and anti-totalitarian. Camus' biographer Olivier Todd criticised Onfray for over-politicising and for creating caricatures detached from the period in which Camus lived.

=== Tributes ===
In Tipasa, Algeria, inside the Roman ruins, facing the sea and Mount Chenoua, a stele was erected in 1961 in honor of Albert Camus with this phrase in French extracted from his work Noces à Tipasa: "I understand here what is called glory: the right to love beyond measure" (French: Je comprends ici ce qu'on appelle gloire : le droit d'aimer sans mesure).

The French Post published a stamp with his likeness on 26 June 1967.

== Personal life ==
=== Marriages and extramarital affairs ===
In 1934, Camus was in a relationship with Simone Hié. Simone had an addiction to morphine, a drug she used to ease her menstrual pains. His uncle Gustave did not approve of the relationship, but Camus married Hié to help her fight the addiction. He subsequently discovered she was in a relationship with her doctor at the same time and the couple later divorced.

After ending up in Lyon, he married pianist and mathematician Francine Faure on 3 December 1940. After the war, Camus lived in Paris with Faure, who gave birth to twins, Catherine and Jean, in 1945.

Camus had numerous affairs, particularly an irregular and eventually public affair with the Spanish-born actress María Casares, with whom he had extensive correspondence. Faure did not take this affair lightly. She had a mental breakdown and needed hospitalisation in the early 1950s. Camus, who felt guilty, withdrew from public life and was slightly depressed for some time.

=== Political stances ===
Camus was a moralist; he claimed morality should guide politics. While he did not deny that morals change over time, he rejected the classical Marxist view that historical material relations define morality.

Camus was also strongly critical of Marxism–Leninism, which he considered totalitarian, especially in the case of the Soviet Union. Camus rebuked those sympathetic to the Soviet model and their "decision to call total servitude freedom". A proponent of libertarian socialism, he stated that the Soviet Union was not socialist and the United States was not liberal. His critique of the Soviet Union caused him to clash with others on the political left, most notably with his on-again/off-again friend Jean-Paul Sartre.

Active in the French Resistance to the Nazi occupation of France during World War II, Camus wrote for and edited the Resistance journal Combat. Of the French collaboration with the German occupiers, he wrote: "Now the only moral value is courage, which is useful here for judging the puppets and chatterboxes who pretend to speak in the name of the people." After France's liberation, Camus remarked: "This country does not need a Talleyrand, but a Saint-Just." The reality of the postwar tribunals soon changed his mind: Camus publicly reversed himself and became a lifelong opponent of capital punishment.

Camus had anarchist sympathies, which intensified in the 1950s, when he came to believe that the Soviet model was morally bankrupt. Camus was firmly against any kind of exploitation, authority, or property, as well as the State and centralization. However, he opposed revolution, separating the rebel from the revolutionary and believing that the belief in "absolute truth", most often assuming the guise of history or reason, inspires the revolutionary and leads to tragic results. He believed that rebellion is spurred by our outrage over the world's lack of transcendent significance, while political rebellion is our response to attacks against the dignity and autonomy of the individual. Camus opposed political violence, tolerating it only in rare and very narrowly defined instances, as well as revolutionary terror, which he accused of sacrificing innocent lives on the altar of history.

David Sherman considers Camus an anarcho-syndicalist. Graeme Nicholson considers Camus an existentialist anarchist.

The anarchist André Prudhommeaux first introduced him at a meeting of the Cercle des Étudiants Anarchistes ('Anarchist Student Circle') in 1948 as a sympathiser familiar with anarchist thought. Camus wrote for anarchist publications such as Le Libertaire ('The Libertarian'), La Révolution prolétarienne ('The Proletarian Revolution'), and Solidaridad Obrera ('Workers' Solidarity'), the organ of the anarcho-syndicalist Confederación Nacional del Trabajo (CNT, 'National Confederation of Labor').

Camus kept a neutral stance during the Algerian Revolution (1954–1962). While he was against the violence of the National Liberation Front (FLN), he acknowledged the injustice and brutalities imposed by colonialist France. He was supportive of Pierre Mendès France's Unified Socialist Party (PSU) and its approach to the crisis; Mendès France advocated for reconciliation. Camus also supported a like-minded Algerian militant, Aziz Kessous. Camus traveled to Algeria to negotiate a truce between the two belligerents but was met with distrust by all parties.

In one often-misquoted incident, Camus confronted an Algerian critic during his 1957 Nobel Prize acceptance speech in Stockholm, rejecting the false equivalence of justice with revolutionary terrorism: "People are now planting bombs in the tramways of Algiers. My mother might be on one of those tramways. If that is justice, then I prefer my mother." Critics have labelled the response as reactionary and a result of a colonialist attitude.

Camus was sharply critical of the proliferation of nuclear weapons and the bombings of Hiroshima and Nagasaki. In the 1950s, Camus devoted his efforts to human rights. In 1952, he resigned from his work for UNESCO when the UN accepted Spain, under the leadership of the caudillo General Francisco Franco, as a member. Camus maintained his pacifism and resisted capital punishment anywhere in the world. He wrote an essay against capital punishment in collaboration with Arthur Koestler, the writer, intellectual, and founder of the League Against Capital Punishment, entitled Réflexions sur la peine capitale ('Reflections on Capital Punishment'), published by Calmann-Levy in 1957.

Along with Albert Einstein, Camus was one of the sponsors of the Peoples' World Convention (PWC), also known as Peoples' World Constituent Assembly (PWCA), which took place between 1950 and 1951 at Palais Electoral in Geneva, Switzerland.

==== Role in Algeria ====
The administrative organization of French Algeria between 1905 and 1955

Born in Algeria to French parents, Camus was familiar with the institutional racism of France against Arabs and Berbers, but he was not part of a rich elite. He lived in very poor conditions as a child, but was a citizen of France and as such was entitled to citizens' rights; members of the country's Arab and Berber majority were not.

Camus was a vocal advocate of the "new Mediterranean Culture". This was his vision of embracing the multi-ethnicity of the Algerian people, in opposition to "Latinité", a popular pro-fascist and antisemitic ideology among other pieds-noirs – French or other Europeans born in Algeria. For Camus, this vision encapsulated the Hellenic humanism which survived among ordinary people around the Mediterranean Sea. His 1938 address on "The New Mediterranean Culture" represents Camus's most systematic statement of his views at this time.

Camus also supported the Blum–Viollette proposal to grant Algerians full French citizenship in a manifesto with arguments defending this assimilative proposal on radical egalitarian grounds. In 1939, Camus wrote a stinging series of articles for the Alger républicain on the atrocious living conditions of the inhabitants of the Kabylie highlands. He advocated for economic, educational, and political reforms as a matter of emergency.

In 1945, following the Sétif and Guelma massacre after Arabs revolted against French mistreatment, Camus was one of only a few mainland journalists to visit the colony. He wrote a series of articles reporting on conditions and advocating for French reforms and concessions to the demands of the Algerian people.

When the Algerian War began in 1954, Camus was confronted with a moral dilemma. He identified with the pieds-noirs such as his own parents and defended the French government's actions against the revolt. He argued the Algerian uprising was an integral part of the "new Arab imperialism" led by Egypt and an "anti-Western" offensive orchestrated by Russia to "encircle Europe" and "isolate the United States".

Although favoring greater Algerian autonomy or even federation, though not full-scale independence, he believed the pieds-noirs and Arabs could co-exist. During the war, he advocated a civil truce that would spare the civilians. It was rejected by both sides, who regarded it as foolish. Behind the scenes, he began working for imprisoned Algerians who faced the death penalty. His position drew much criticism from the left and later postcolonial literary critics, such as Edward Said, who were opposed to European imperialism and charged that Camus's novels and short stories are plagued with colonial depictions – or conscious erasures – of Algeria's Arab population. In their eyes, Camus was no longer the defender of the oppressed. Camus once said that the troubles in Algeria "affected him as others feel pain in their lungs".

== Works ==
The works of Albert Camus include:

=== Novels ===
- A Happy Death (La Mort heureuse; written 1936–38, published 1971)
- The Stranger (L'Étranger, often translated as The Outsider, though an alternate meaning of l'étranger is 'foreigner'; 1942)
- The Plague (La Peste, 1947)
- The Fall (La Chute, 1956)
- The First Man (Le premier homme; incomplete, published 1994)

=== Short stories ===
- Exile and the Kingdom (L'exil et le royaume; collection, 1957), containing the following short stories:
  - "The Adulterous Woman" (La Femme adultère)
  - "The Renegade or a Confused Spirit" (Le Renégat ou un esprit confus)
  - "The Silent Men" (Les Muets)
  - "The Guest" (L'Hôte)
  - "Jonas, or the Artist at Work" (Jonas, ou l'artiste au travail)
  - "The Growing Stone" (La Pierre qui pousse)

=== Academic theses ===
- Christian Metaphysics and Neoplatonism (Métaphysique chrétienne et néoplatonisme; 1935): the thesis that enabled Camus to teach in secondary schools in France

=== Non-fiction ===
- Betwixt and Between (L'envers et l'endroit, also translated as The Wrong Side and the Right Side; collection, 1937)
- Nuptials (Noces, 1938)
- The Myth of Sisyphus (Le Mythe de Sisyphe, 1942)
- The Rebel (L'Homme révolté, 1951)
- Algerian Chronicles (Chroniques algériennes; 1958, first English translation published 2013)
- Resistance, Rebellion, and Death (collection, 1961)
- Notebooks 1935–1942 (Carnets: mai 1935—fevrier 1942, 1962)
- Notebooks 1942–1951 (Carnets II: janvier 1942—mars 1951, 1965)
- Lyrical and Critical Essays (collection, 1968)
- American Journals (Journaux de voyage, 1978)
- Notebooks 1951–1959 (Carnets III: mars 1951—décembre 1959, 1989)
- Correspondance (1944–1959) (The correspondence of Albert Camus and María Casares, with a preface by his daughter, Catherine; 2017)

=== Plays ===
- Caligula (written 1938, performed 1945)
- The Misunderstanding (Le Malentendu, 1944)
- The State of Siege (L'État de Siège, 1948)
- The Just Assassins (Les Justes, 1949)
- Requiem for a Nun (Requiem pour une nonne, adapted from William Faulkner's novel by the same name; 1956)
- The Possessed (Les Possédés, adapted from Fyodor Dostoyevsky's novel Demons; 1959)

=== Essays ===
- The Crisis of Man (Lecture at Columbia University, 28 March 1946)
- Neither Victims nor Executioners (series of essays in Combat, 1946)
- Why Spain? (essay for the theatrical play L'Etat de Siège, 1948)
- Summer (L'Été, 1954)
- Reflections on the Guillotine (Réflexions sur la guillotine; extended essay, 1957)
- Create Dangerously (Essay on Realism and Artistic Creation; lecture at the University of Uppsala in Sweden, 1957)
