= Deaths in May 1986 =

The following is a list of notable deaths in May 1986.

Entries for each day are listed alphabetically by surname. A typical entry lists information in the following sequence:

- Name, age, country of citizenship at birth, subsequent country of citizenship (if applicable), reason for notability, cause of death (if known), and reference.

== May 1986 ==
=== 1 ===
- Hylda Baker, 81, English actress and comedian, pneumonia.
- John Bartlett, 40, New Zealand botanist.
- Reg Boyle, 83, Australian rules footballer.
- Dennis Emery, 52, English footballer.
- Heinrich Fraenkel, 88, Polish-British screenwriter and biographer.
- Mirrie Hill, 96, Australian composer.
- Mirko Javornik, 76, Slovenian writer.
- Arthur Lipsett, 49, Canadian filmmaker, suicide.
- Alastair McIntyre, 59, British film editor, complications from a stroke.
- Edgar Parin d'Aulaire, 87, American children's author.
- Hugo Peretti, 69, American songwriter.
- Sir James Ramsay, 69, Australian politician.
- Millicent Silver, 80, English harpsichordist.
- Alfredo Varela Jr., 73, Mexican screenwriter.
- Ed Wells, 85, American Major League baseball player.

=== 2 ===
- Sir Marcus Beeck, 62, Australian farmer and business executive.
- Wallace Bishop, 80, American drummer.
- W. Sheffield Cowles, 87, American politician, member of the Connecticut House of Representatives (1948–1956).
- Sergio Cresto, 30, American racing driver, car explosion.
- William Edward Doyle, 75, American jurist.
- Georgy Gause, 75, Soviet biologist.
- Edwin Genung, 78, American Olympic middle-distance runner (1932).
- Edwin Sherbon Hills, 79, Australian geologist.
- Wilfrid Kidson, 79, South African cricketer.
- Lotte Brand Philip, 75, German art historian.
- Edward Righton Jr, 73, English cricketer.
- Violet Rucroft, 83, New Zealand conservationist.
- Gertrud Theiler, 88, South African parasitologist.
- Henri Toivonen, 29, Finnish racing driver, car explosion.
- Jan Wojciechowski, 81, Polish footballer.

=== 3 ===
- Robert Alda, 72, American actor.
- Carlton W. Barrett, 66, American soldier, Medal of Honor recipient.
- Ed Courtney Jr., 80, Australian rugby league footballer.
- Clarence Drouillard, 72, Canadian National Hockey League player (Detroit Red Wings).
- Nicolò Nicolosi, 73, Italian footballer.
- Royce S. Pitkin, 84, American academic administrator.
- Wang Li, 85, Chinese linguist.

=== 4 ===
- Kotti Chave, 74, Finnish-born Swedish actor.
- Richard Daniel, 85, German general.
- Jean Gagé, 83, French historian.
- Paul Magnus Gross, 90, American chemist.
- Enzo Liberti, 60, Italian actor, complications from heart surgery.
- Hugh Luby, 72, American baseball player.
- Benjamin Muse, 88, American politician and journalist, member of the Virginia Senate (1936).
- Paul Richards, 77, American Major League baseball player, heart attack.
- Romeo Rivers, 79, Canadian ice hockey player.
- Robert Samatan, 77, French rugby league and union footballer.
- Esther Van Wagoner Tufty, 89, American journalist.
- James Allen Vann, 46, American historian.
- Johnny Williams, 68, American baseball player.

=== 5 ===
- Louis Betbeder Matibet, 84, French chess master.
- Joe Childress, 52, American NFL football player, cancer.
- Bill Cook, 90, Canadian NHL ice hockey player, cancer.
- Emygdio de Barros, 90–91, Brazilian painter.
- Käthe Haack, 88, German actress.
- Knud Hvidberg, 58, Danish artist.
- René Joffroy, 70, French archaeologist.
- Sully Kothmann, 53, American Olympic figure skater (1956).
- Billy Mackel, 73, American guitarist.
- Louis Betbeder Matibet, 84, French chess player.
- Satrio, 69, Indonesian military doctor and politician.
- John Austin Victoreen, 83, American physicist.
- George White, 81, Australian politician.
- Julia Wojciechowska, 71, Polish Olympic gymnast (1936).

=== 6 ===
- Fred C. Cole, 74, American librarian, heart failure.
- Albert Ernest Forsythe, 89, American aviator.
- Giuseppe Giaccone, 85, Italian footballer.
- Lorenzo Minio-Paluello, 78, Italian linguist and translator.
- Jack Rickards, 57, Zimbabwean Olympic sports shooter (1964).
- Héctor Ruiz Martínez, 42, Puerto Rican politician.
- Sri Sabaratnam, 33, Sri Lankan militant (Tamil Eelam Liberation Organization), shot.
- Len Schulte, 69, American Major League baseball player.
- Sergei Gavrilovich Simonov, 92, Soviet weapon designer (SKS).
- Stefan Sznuk, 89–90, Polish-Canadian aviator.
- Toralf Westermoen, 71, Norwegian boat designer.

=== 7 ===
- Laura Alves, 64, Portuguese actress.
- Ferdinand Bruhin, 77, Swiss footballer.
- Charlie Colombo, 65, American soccer player.
- Florence Dagmar, 90, American actress.
- Gaston Defferre, 75, French politician.
- Cornelia Johanna de Vogel, 81, Dutch classical scholar and theologian.
- Jean-Pierre Hagnauer, 73, French Olympic ice hockey player (1936).
- Peter Haworth, 96–97, British-born Canadian painter.
- André Jubelin, 79, French naval admiral.
- Robert A. Lovett, 90, American politician, secretary of defense (1951–1953).
- Cyril McMahon, 64, Australian rugby league footballer.
- Al Mooney, 80, American aircraft designer.
- Jeffrey Mylett, 36, American actor and songwriter, AIDS.
- Juan Nakpil, 86, Filipino architect.
- Jonas Persson, 72, Swedish Olympic cyclist (1936).
- Alfredo Pezzana, 93, Italian Olympic fencer (1936).
- Edward Root, 83, Australian rugby league player.
- Selman Selmanagić, 81, Bosnian-German architect.
- Herma Szabo, 84, Austrian Olympic figure skater (1924).
- Haldun Taner, 71, Turkish playwright, heart attack.
- George Weaver, 77, Canadian politician, MP (1949–1957).

=== 8 ===
- Ernle Bradford, 64, British historian.
- Melanija Bugarinović, 80, Yugoslav singer.
- Erwin Chamberlain, 71, Canadian ice hockey player.
- Ivan Corry, 78, Australian rules footballer.
- Eugenie Gershoy, 85, American artist.
- R. M. Jackson, 82, British jurist.
- Majid Salek Mahmoudi, 33, Iranian serial killer, suicide by hanging.
- Raffaele Nasi, 76, Italian Olympic skier (1936).
- Richard W. Richards, 91, Australian physicist.
- Manny Shinwell, 101, British politician, MP (1922–1924, 1928–1931, 1935–1970).
- Leland Stark, 78, American Anglican prelate.
- Arndt von Bohlen und Halbach, 48, German socialite, oral cancer.

=== 9 ===
- Mikhail Alpatov, 83, Soviet historian and art theorist.
- Nelson Ball, 77, New Zealand rugby player.
- Herschel Bernardi, 62, American actor (Arnie, Peter Gunn, Fiddler on the Roof), heart attack.
- Mirosław Bojanowicz, 79–80, Polish-British philatelist.
- Peter Jackson, 80, English footballer.
- Eana Jeans, 95, New Zealand painter.
- Thomas Liao, 76, Taiwanese politician.
- Colin Lyman, 72, English footballer.
- Tenzing Norgay, 71, Nepalese-Indian mountaineer (1953 British Mount Everest expedition), cerebral hemorrhage.
- Alden Pasche, 75, American basketball coach.

=== 10 ===
- Aleksandr Akimov, 33, Soviet engineer, acute radiation syndrome.
- Al Burruss, 58, American politician, member of the Georgia House of Representatives (since 1964), pancreatic cancer.
- Wilbur Hogg, 69, American Anglican prelate.
- Anna Kamieńska, 66, Polish writer.
- Lillian Kasindorf Kavey, 96, American banker and activist.
- Tagir Kusimov, 77, Soviet general.
- Leopoldo Ruiz, 59, Argentine golfer.
- Gregory Ryan, 73, Australian cricketer.
- Josimo Morais Tavares, 32–33, Brazilian Roman Catholic priest, homicide.
- John Wheatley, 59, American physicist.
- Charles "Hungry" Williams, 51, American drummer, Paget's disease of bone.

=== 11 ===
- Edoardo Anton, 76, Italian filmmaker.
- Jimmy Hines, 82, American golfer.
- Viktor Kibenok, 23, Soviet firefighter, acute radiation syndrome.
- Gerry H. Kisters, 67, American soldier, Medal of Honor recipient.
- Kilby MacDonald, 72, Canadian NHL ice hockey player.
- Walter K. Martinez, 55, American politician, member of the New Mexico House of Representatives (1966–1984), amyotrophic lateral sclerosis.
- Henry Plumer McIlhenny, 75, American art curator and connoisseur.
- Fritz Pollard, 92, American NFL football player and coach.
- Volodymyr Pravyk, 23, Soviet firefighter, acute radiation syndrome.

=== 12 ===
- Helge Akre, 83, Norwegian diplomat.
- Sofía Álvarez Vignoli, 86, Uruguayan jurist, first lady (1976).
- Elisabeth Bergner, 88, Austrian-British actress, cancer.
- Mary deGarmo Bryan, 94, American dietician.
- Harold W. Clark, 94, American creationist.
- Albert Cooper, 75, British politician, MP (1950–1966, 1970–1974).
- Joseph Fadahunsi, 84–85, Nigerian politician.
- Fred Kormis, 91, German sculptor.
- Eleanor Frances Lattimore, 81, American writer.
- William Harrington Leahy, 81, American naval admiral.
- Wanda Jean Mays, 26, American missing persons case, fall.
- Alicia Moreau de Justo, 100, Argentine social activist and politician.
- Ramon Muller, 51, Argentine footballer.
- Bill Nairn, 73, Canadian football player.
- Reuben Harold Tweten, 87, American politician, member of the Minnesota House of Representatives (1947–1956).

=== 13 ===
- Alexander Archdale, 80, British-Australian actor.
- Maria Bellonci, 83, Italian writer.
- George Gaines, 52, American set decorator.
- Vasily Ignatenko, 25, Soviet firefighter, acute radiation syndrome.
- Robert LeFevre, 74, American libertarian autarchist activist.
- Peadar O'Donnell, 93, Irish politician, TD (1923–1927).

=== 14 ===
- Janne Aikala, 10, Finnish murder victim.
- Solomon Blatt Sr., 91, American politician, member of the South Carolina House of Representatives (since 1932).
- Henry E. Eccles, 87, American naval admiral.
- Pierino Favalli, 72, Italian racing cyclist.
- Fuang Jotiko, 70–71, Thai Buddhist monk.
- William Lindsay, 40, British actor.
- Norma Millay, 91–92, American singer and actress.
- Frank O'Rourke, 92, Canadian-American Major League baseball player.
- Mose Rager, 75, American guitarist.
- Gianni Ravera, 66, Italian singer, impresario, and record producer.
- Joe Sparma, 44, American Major League baseball player, complications from heart surgery.
- Nelson Stacy, 64, American racing driver.
- C. H. V. Sutherland, 78, English numismatist.
- Leonid Toptunov, 25, Soviet electrical engineer, acute radiation syndrome.
- Tom Turner, 69, American Major League baseball player.
- Steef van Musscher, 84, Dutch Olympic jumper (1928).
- Cornelis Gijsbert Gerrit Jan van Steenis, 84, Dutch botanist.
- Robert Zielinski, 84, American football player.

=== 15 ===
- Constantine John Alexopoulos, 79, American mycologist.
- John F. Bassett, 47, Canadian tennis player and businessman, brain cancer.
- Hel Braun, 71, German mathematician.
- Elio de Angelis, 28, Italian racing driver, smoke inhalation.
- Johnny Gottselig, 80, Russian-born NHL American ice hockey player.
- Rose Lokissim, 30–31, Chadian soldier, shot.
- Mieczysław Palus, 64, Polish ice hockey player.
- Shirley Leon Quimby, 92, American physicist.
- Sir Maxwell Richmond, 85, New Zealand naval admiral.
- Willie Telfer, 77, Scottish footballer.
- Luis Torres Nadal, 42, Puerto Rican playwright and theatre director, homicide.
- Bill Tricklebank, 70, New Zealand cricketer.
- Theodore H. White, 71, American political journalist, stroke.

=== 16 ===
- Anton Banko, 58, Slovenian inventor and engineer.
- Lothar Beutel, 84, German soldier.
- Joe Bootham, 74, New Zealand painter.
- Ralph Eaton, 87, American soldier, United States Army officer.
- Ronald Robson, 73, South African cricketer.
- Mykola Tytenok, 23, Soviet firefighter, acute radiation syndrome.
- John H. Yancey, 68, American soldier.

=== 17 ===
- John Gibson, 37, American actor, plane crash.
- Freddie Jakeman, 66, English cricketer.
- Masaji Kitano, 91, Japanese general, physician, and war criminal (Unit 731).
- Preben Lundgren Kristensen, 62, Danish Olympic cyclist (1952).
- Roberts Pakalns, 74, Soviet Latvian footballer.
- Lyudmila Pakhomova, 39, Soviet Olympic ice dancer (1976), leukemia.
- Jack Waldman, 33, American musician, lymphoma.

=== 18 ===
- Charles Albertine, 57, American composer.
- Robert Page Arnot, 95, British journalist.
- Gustl Berauer, 73, Czechoslovak skier.
- John W. Bubbles, 84, American tap dancer and actor.
- Yaşar Erkan, 75, Turkish Olympic wrestler (1936).
- Gianni Gambi, 78, Italian Olympic swimmer (1928).
- František Krajčír, 72 Czechoslovak politician and diplomat.
- Giuseppe Lazzati, 76, Italian Roman Catholic priest and politician.
- Louis L. Madsen, 78, American academic administrator.
- John Guthrie Paterson, 84, Australian politician.
- James Phemister, 93, Scottish geologist.
- Kanuri Lakshmana Rao, 83, Indian politician, MP (1962–1977).
- Peter Wehle, 72, Austrian actor.
- Spades Wood, 77, American Major League baseball player.
- Zé Luiz, 56, Brazilian basketball player and Olympian.

=== 19 ===
- Howard Benge, 72, New Zealand rower.
- George Boyes, 75, South African cricketer.
- Joe Greenwald, 97, American Olympic equestrian (1920).
- Jimmy Lyons, 54, American saxophonist, lung cancer.
- Abbot Mills, 87, American economist.
- Sarath Muttetuwegama, 68, Sri Lankan politician.
- Bernard Naylor, 78, English-Canadian composer.
- Tibor Nyilas, 71, Hungarian-born American Olympic fencer (1948).
- Harry Owen, 80, Australian rugby league player.
- Knut Rød, 85, Norwegian police officer and Nazi collaborator.
- Len Stansbridge, 67, English footballer.
- Leonard Trent, 71, New Zealand aviator, VC recipient.
- Behçet Uz, 92–93, Turkish politician.
- Titus Vibe-Müller, 73, Norwegian film director.

=== 20 ===
- Helen Belyea, 73, Canadian geologist.
- Clyde Bernhardt, 80, American trombonist.
- Karol Olgierd Borchardt, 81, Polish naval captain and writer.
- Danielle Chenard, 28, Canadian Olympic handball player (1976).
- Evo Anton DeConcini, 85, American jurist.
- Gordon Hickman Garland, 88, American politician, member of the California State Assembly (1937–1943).
- Frank McMahon, 83, Canadian oil executive.
- Fritz Moegle, 69, Austrian art director.
- Melvin R. Novick, 53, American statistician.
- James O'Keeffe, 73–74, Irish politician, TD (1961–1965).
- Dudley Spurling, 72, Bermudian politician and Olympic swimmer (1936).
- Helen B. Taussig, 87, American cardiologist, traffic collision.
- Pim van Boetzelaer van Oosterhout, 93, Dutch politician and diplomat.
- Robert Wood, 61, American television executive.

=== 21 ===
- Heather Baden-Powell, 70, English secretary.
- Kenny Carter, 25, British motorcycle racer, suicide by gunshot.
- Ralph Evinrude, 78, American businessman.
- Bum Farto, 66, American fire chief and convicted drug dealer, declared legally dead in absentia.
- Yetta Dorothea Geffen, 94, American musician and journalist.
- Juozas Grušas, 84, Soviet Lithuanian writer.
- Viggo Jørgensen, 86, Danish Olympic footballer (1920).
- Mary Kawena Pukui, 91, American writer.

=== 22 ===
- Umar al-Tilmisani, 81, Egyptian Islamist (Muslim Brotherhood).
- James "Lugs" Branigan, 76, Irish boxer.
- George Chapman, 82, Australian cricketer.
- Renaat Demoen, 71, Belgian cartoonist.
- George Forrest, 81, Scottish-Canadian soccer player.
- Martin Gabel, 74, American actor and filmmaker, heart attack.
- Desmond Gillespie, 74, Northern Irish politician.
- James Gentle, 81, American soccer player.
- Lol Hamlett, 69, English footballer.
- Lon Hatherell, 55, Australian rugby player.
- Hisatora Kumagai, 82, Japanese filmmaker.
- Gordon Nell, 78, American baseball player.
- Georgie Nokes, 49, American actor.
- Avery Rockefeller, 82, American investment banker and conservationist, heart attack.
- Yechezkel Taub, 90, Polish-Israeli rabbi.
- Lady Gwen Thompson, 57, American writer.
- Harvey Uhlenhopp, 70, American jurist.
- Archie Van Winkle, 61, American soldier, Medal of Honor recipient.
- Charles F. Voegelin, 80, American linguist.

=== 23 ===
- Gerald Covey, 58, Canadian Olympic canoer (1948).
- Henri de La Bastide, 69, French writer.
- William J. Garsoe, 68, American politician, member of the Maine House of Representatives (1973–1980).
- Emma Genevieve Gillette, 88, American conservationist.
- Edward Hart, 74–75, Scottish physician.
- Sterling Hayden, 70, American actor (Dr. Strangelove, The Killing, The Asphalt Jungle), prostate cancer.
- Lloyd Hulbert, 67, American botanist.
- William Johnston, 71, British Anglican prelate.
- Henry Arnold Karo, 82, American naval admiral.
- Hugh McMullen, 84, American Major League baseball player.
- Archie Sam, 71, American Natchez leader.
- August Schaffer, 80, Austrian Olympic cyclist (1928).
- Altiero Spinelli, 78, Italian politician, MEP (since 1979).
- Henry Sprinks, 80, English cricketer.
- George Thompson, 79, Australian rules footballer.
- Movlid Visaitov, 72, Soviet soldier.
- Elena Žalinkevičaitė-Petrauskienė, 85, Soviet Lithuanian actress.

=== 24 ===
- Gunnar Björnstrand, 76, Swedish actor.
- Yakima Canutt, 90, American actor and stuntman, cardiac arrest.
- Mick Cossey, 51, New Zealand rugby player.
- Margit Dajka, 78, Hungarian actress.
- Tommy Dea, 77, Australian rules footballer.
- Rich Ferguson, 54, Canadian runner.
- Erich Gerberding, 64, German actor.
- Eduardo González-Gallarza, 88, Spanish general and politician.
- George Gordon, 79, American animator.
- Chris Graham, 86, Canadian Olympic boxer (1920).
- Robert Holmes, 60, British scriptwriter.
- Sam B. Holt, 83, American sports coach.
- Fazlul Karim, 80, Bangladeshi politician and lawyer.
- Władysław Masłowski, 52, Polish journalist.
- Gord Pettinger, 74, British-born Canadian ice hockey player.
- Henry Power, 81, Australian rules footballer.
- Arthur Rubloff, 83, American real estate developer.
- John Santall, 78, English cricketer.
- Stephen D. Thorne, 33, American aviator, plane crash.
- Eva Waldemarsson, 82, Swedish writer.
- Buzz Warren, 69, American NFL player (Philadelphia Eagles, Pittsburgh Steelers).

=== 25 ===
- Nisson Alpert, 58, Polish-born American rabbi.
- Guy Amsler, 90, American attorney.
- Carlo Betocchi, 87, Italian poet.
- Chester B. Bowles, 85, American politician and diplomat, governor of Connecticut (1949–1951), member of the U.S. House of Representatives (1959–1961), Parkinson's disease.
- Louella E. Cable, 85, American ichthyologist.
- Árpád Lajtos, 75, Hungarian soldier.
- Rolf Lauer, 54, German Olympic gymnast (1952).
- Owen Hood Phillips, 78, British jurist.
- Shrikant Verma, 54, Indian politician and poet.
- John Verney, 20th Baron Willoughby de Broke, 90, British hereditary peer.

=== 26 ===
- Vitaly Abalakov, 80, Soviet inventor and mountaineer.
- Peggy Ann Clifford, 65, English actress.
- Gian-Carlo Coppola, 22, American film producer and actor, boating accident.
- Glynn R. Donaho, 81, American naval admiral, pneumonia.
- Godfrey Higgs, 78, Bahamian Olympic sailor (1952).
- James J. Y. Liu, 59–60, Chinese-American literary scholar.

=== 27 ===
- Bernard Ades, 82, American attorney and civil rights activist.
- Chris Anderson, 60, Scottish footballer and football administrator.
- Ismail al-Faruqi, 65, Palestinian-American philosopher, stabbed.
- Lois Lamya al-Faruqi, 59, American art scholar, stabbed.
- Chris Anderson, 60, Scottish footballer, motor neurone disease.
- Tsendiin Damdinsüren, 77, Mongolian writer and linguist.
- Henry Dreyer, 75, American Olympic hammer thrower (1936, 1948).
- Harry Easton Godwin, 78, American musical scholar.
- Jaakko Kunnas, 82, Finnish Olympic gymnast (1928).
- Ajoy Mukherjee, 85, Indian politician.
- Jaideva Singh, 92, Indian musicologist.
- Johnny Sisk, 79, American NFL football player.
- Limmie Snell, 37, American singer, renal failure.
- Giorgos Tzifos, 67–68, Greek actor.
- Charles Bierer Wrightsman, 90, American oil executive.

=== 28 ===
- Marguerite Courtot, 88, American actress.
- Taylor Douthit, 85, American Major League baseball player.
- Bill Findlay, 72, Australian rules footballer.
- Paul Florence, 86, American Major League baseball player.
- Gunnar Hägg, 82, Swedish chemist.
- Lea Ivanova, 62, Bulgarian jazz singer.
- Don MacLaughlin, 79, American actor.
- Borislav Milić, 60, Yugoslav chess player.
- Archibald Hugh Mitchell, 82, Canadian politician, MP (1935–1940).
- Lurene Tuttle, 78, American actress, cancer.

=== 29 ===
- Alena Aladava, 79, Soviet Belarusian art historian and curator.
- Nicole Algan, 61, French sculptor.
- Onelio Jorge Cardoso, 72, Cuban filmmaker.
- José Luis Carreño, 80, Spanish Roman Catholic priest.
- Mary Davidson, 83–84, Irish politician.
- Inge Landgut, 63, German actress.
- Thomas C. Lynch, 82, American lawyer.
- Adriaan A. van der Willigen, 76, Dutch philatelist.

=== 30 ===
- Richard Armstrong, 82, English writer.
- José de Caralt, 79, Spanish Olympic field hockey player (1928).
- Perry Ellis, 46, American fashion designer, AIDS.
- Boy Gobert, 60, German actor.
- Donald S. Klopfer, 84, American publisher (Random House).
- Gulshan Mehra, 49, Indian cricketer.
- Hank Mobley, 55, American saxophonist, pneumonia.
- Teiichiro Morinaga, 75, Japanese banker and businessman.

=== 31 ===
- Sylvia Coleridge, 76, British actress.
- Roger W. Cutler Jr., 70, American Olympic rower (1936).
- Jane Frank, 67, American artist.
- Great Nephew, 22–23, British Thoroughbred racehorse.
- Florence Elsie Inman, 94, Canadian politician, complications from a heart attack.
- T. R. Mahalingam, 59, Indian flautist, cerebral hemorrhage.
- Dixie McArthur, 94, American Major League baseball player.
- Ron Neville, 56, Australian-born Papua New Guinean politician, traffic collision.
- James Rainwater, 68, American physicist, Nobel Prize recipient (1975).
- Albert Reed Jr., 64, American actor.
- Dora Russell, 92, British author and feminist.
- Patrick Shea, 78, Northern Irish civil servant.
- Joseph Van Dam, 84, Belgian road bicycle racer.
- Hugh Webster, 58, Scottish-born Canadian actor.
- Michel Wyder, 36, Swiss racing driver, racing collision.
