= Santall =

Santall may refer to three English cricketers of the same family:

- John Santall (1907–1986), Worcestershire cricketer
- Reg Santall (1903–1950), Warwickshire cricketer
- Sydney Santall (1873–1957), Warwickshire cricekter, father of Reg and John
