= Edmond Charlot =

French-Algerian publisher

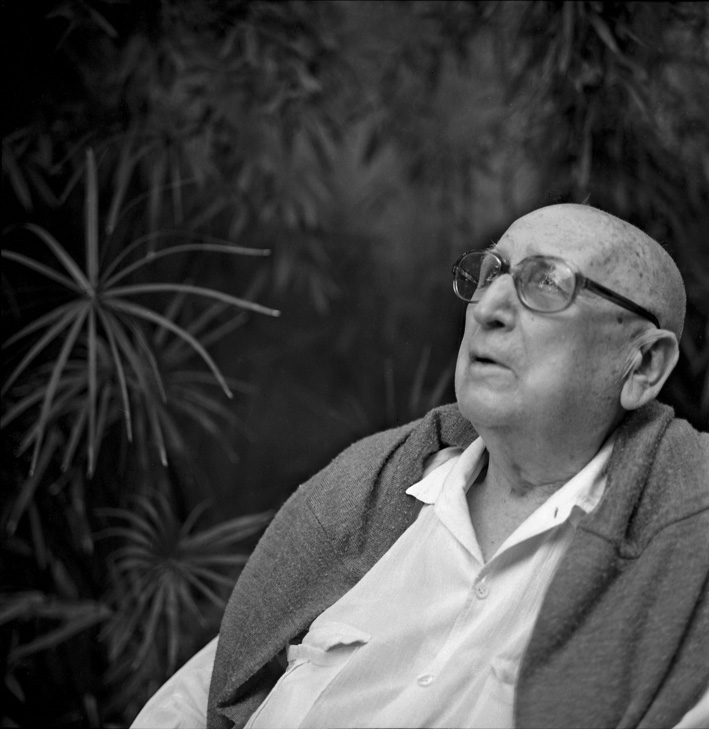
- Edmond Charlot in 2002
- Born: 15 February 1915; Algiers, French Algeria
- Died: 10 April 2004 (aged 89); Béziers, Hérault, France
- Occupations: Publisher and editor

Edmond Charlot (English: /ʃɑːrˈloʊ/ shar-LOH, French: [ɛdmɔ̃ ʃaʁlo]; 1915–2004) was a French-Algerian publisher and editor. He is best known for his friendship with Albert Camus and for being his first publisher.

== Biography ==
Edmond Charlot was born on 15 February 1915 in Algiers and died on 10 April 2004 in Béziers, close to where he lived in Pézenas in the south of France in the department of Hérault. He was a publisher and ran specialist bookshops in Algiers and Pézenas as well as being an editor in Paris. He published the first works of Albert Camus and many other important authors, including a translation of Gertrude Stein. He exhibited artwork and was a leading cultural figure in French literature, especially of the Mediterranean region on both the European and African shores. His contribution to literature, visual arts and French culture had been little recognised in his lifetime – even by close friends. Since his death his work and influence on the arts and literature has been discussed in colloquia, articles and books.

== Charlot as a publisher ==
Charlot's first foray into publishing was in May 1936, with a print run of five hundred, a play co-written by Camus, Jeanne-Paule Sicard, Yves Bourgeois and Alfred Poignant called Révolte dans les Asturies. This concerned a revolt by Spanish miners brutally suppressed by the Spanish government. A group of friends, including Charlot, intended to put the play on. The play was censored by the Algerian authorities and the group lost money on the venture. Charlot published it to refinance his friends.

Charlot was influenced by Gabriel Audisio, a writer who celebrated the Mediterranean. Charlot explicitly acknowledged the debt to Audisio when he said he wanted to create a collection of classics of the Mediterranean, not simply Algeria. However, Charlot was not a simple disciple of Audisio. Audisio had a clear vision of the Mediterranean that was influenced by the Greeks rather than the later Roman domination of the region. Charlot's 1936 Méditerranéennes book series was on the other hand eclectic with works by Camus, Audisio, Jean Grenier, and Federico García Lorca and poems by René-Jean Clot.

He published further works by Camus, for example in May 1937 his first book L’Envers et l’Endroit – dedicated to Grenier. There were also works by Grenier, Audisio, and Max-Pol Fouchet. Then in December 1938 he published the first number of the revue Rivages (shores) which celebrated Mediterranean culture. In 1941 he published the revue Fontaine edited by Max-Pol Fouchet with whom he developed a close working partnership. Fouchet concentrated on the editing and Charlot the commercial side of the business. Fouchet also set up a publishing house also called Fontaine which Charlot accommodated.

Many editors acquiesced with the Nazi Occupation and the Vichy Government. For example, Bernard Grasset approved race laws and "shouted loud and clear his anti-semitism" and he and other editors removed authors on the Liste Otto (first published in 1940, that listed books considered anti-German or anti-Nazi) from their catalogues. However Charlot and some of his circle such as Max-Pol Fouchet, rather than kow-tow to the authorities risked financial hardship and even imprisonment. It has been surmised that an environment of revolt in Algeria may explain the acceptance of risk. Loss of freedom was a reality for Charlot as he was imprisoned briefly after publishing a translation of Paris France by Gertrude Stein (who had described Charlot as a dynamic and resistant editor she was proud to work with – "resistant" was a word with a particular resonance for the Vichy and German authorities of occupied France) for what he later described as the "astonishing claim" that he was presumed to be a Gaullist and communist sympathiser. He was not attached to a political grouping and, unlike Camus, he was never a Communist party member.

As the war progressed things became increasingly difficult. He was released from prison into house arrest and only after he had used one of his contacts (Marcel Sauvage who was close to the Minister of the Interior, Pierre Pucheu) was he released from that. There were practical problems due to scarcity of supplies – made worse as publishers who did not publish those on the Otto list were given supplies and conversely those who refused to comply with the Vichy regime were penalised. Even basics such as paper and ink were difficult to come by. Books were made with any scraps of paper Charlot could cobble together and the covers resembled butchers' wrapping paper, Charlot recalled, and he used staples to bind the pages and ink made from soot. Despite these constraints he sold everything he could put out.

When the Anglo-American forces arrived in 1942, Algeria became the only part of France to be liberated, Algiers became the capital of Free France, Charlot, the "publisher of Free France", and a wave of writers and artists came to Algeria. Charlot's titles included work by André Gide and Jules Roy. In 1944, he published and edited L’Arche, a review created by the poet Jean Amrouche with the explicit blessing of Gide and Charles de Gaulle. The benediction of Gide is illuminating as he was one of the three co-founders in 1909 of the Nouvelle Revue Française, which L’Arche could be said to have culturally replaced during the years of German occupation of France.

After French liberation (the German garrison surrendered Paris on 25 August 1944), Edmond Charlot in December 1944 joined the Ministry of Information in Paris. Living in the barracks, he searched for a place to install his publishing centre near to Saint-Germain-des-Prés, first at the hôtel de la Minerve, rue de la Chaise that Camus had advised him to take, then in the autumn 1945 at 18 rue de Verneuil. He moved it finally in 1947 to a former "maison close" (brothel) at la rue Grégoire-de-Tours, which had counted Apollinaire among its clients. The new law initiated by Marthe Richard ordered the closure of all brothels. Charlot published about a dozen volumes each month, notably the works of Henri Bosco (Le Mas Théotime, 1945, Prix Renaudot), Jean Amrouche (Chants berbères de Kabylie, 1946), Marie-Louise-Taos Amrouche (Jacinthe noire, 1947), Jules Roy (La Vallée heureuse, 1946, Prix Renaudot), Emmanuel Roblès (Les Hauteurs de la ville, 1948, Prix Fémina) and blank verse of Jean Lescure (La Plaie ne se ferme pas, with a lithograph of Estève, 1949).

In 1947 Charlot, who passed to his sister-in-law his first bookshop at Algiers Les Vraies Richesses (English, "Our True Wealth"), started the publication of "ten best French novels" chosen by Gide. Among the titles published under his care were those of Georges Bernanos (1944), Yvon Belaval (1946), Albert Cossery (Les Hommes oubliés de Dieu, 1946; La Maison de la mort certaine, 1947) and Arthur Adamov (1950). However "the finances of Charlot were not a success. Missing a solid cash reserve, lack of insurance and mistreated by his rivals and exposed to the ferocity and jealousy of the older publishing houses, he floundered" wrote Jules Roy. Despite the support of the Association des éditeurs résistants, his financial difficulties grew from 1948 and Charlot could not find the capital nor obtain loans, and was forced into debt to reprint and had to leave the Paris base which carried on some further months (1949-1950) under the direction of Amrouche and Charles Autrand.

One of the most interesting publications was by Général Tubert. The anodyne title (L'Algérie vivra française et heureuse – Algeria will live to be French and happy) disguised a rather disturbing story. For the contents of this volume dated 1943 and by a fictional imprimatur was in fact the 1945 report of Tubert to the Assemblée consultative provisoire (following a massacre in the Constantinois – a region of north-eastern Algeria). The "typographical errors" of the cover are repeated on the title page and were a deliberate effort to disguise the real content and allow the report to be disseminated to avoid the notice of the authorities. From 1936 until his death, but primarily in the 1940s-1950s he published widely, see the table below using information from the 2015 Catalogue raisonné.

- 1936 5 works including Révolte dans les Asturies by Camus et al.
- 1937 8 works including L’Envers et l’Endroit by Camus and Santa-Cruz et autres paysages africains by Genier
- 1938 9 works including two by Audisio and two issues of the review Rivages
- 1939 5 works including Noces by Camus
- 1940 3 works including Prologue by Lorca
- 1941 16 works including those by Lorca, Clot, Roblès and Paris, France by Stein
- 1942 21 works including the Sonnets of Shakespeare
- 1943 20 works including those by Gide and Roy and a further 15 works within Editions France
- 1944 32 works and issues 1-6 of L’Arche
- 1945 28 works (many translations including Persuasion by Jane Austen) and issues 7-11 of L’Arche
- 1946 68 works and issues 12-22 of L’Arche
- 1947 42 works and issues 23-27 of L’Arche
- 1948 4 works
- 1949 12 works
- 1950-56 14 works
- 1957-2003 10 works and director of the Méditerranée vivante (Domens) book series

In his career Charlot worked with three Nobel Laureates, Camus (whose first works he published), Aleixandre (who wrote in the first issue of Rivages) and Gide (who encouraged him to run L’Arche). Other writers in his publishing house won other prestigious prizes such as le prix Renaudot (for Bosco's Le Mas Théotime) and le prix Femina for work by Roblès.

Finally, one notes Charlot published books for children. One of these L’enfant et la rivière became one of the most successful French children's books. It sold 5,000 copies in 1945 but when republished by Gallimard in 1953 sold eventually 1,800,000 copies.

== Charlot and the visual arts ==
From the very onset of his career Charlot was interested in the visual arts. His first venture, Les Vraies Richesses, opened with a three-month exhibition of drawings and three canvases of Bonnard.

Algeria had been between the world wars somewhat pictorially conservative with an emphasis on representative art. Camus, though a writer himself, was deeply interested in the visual arts and counted among his friends many artists who he introduced to Charlot. One such was René-Jean Clot who was also a writer, though he focussed in later life on art. As the Algerian art establishment turned their backs on abstract art, it was places such as Les Vraies Richesses that provided a space to exhibit but also where writers and artists could meet and exchange ideas. Propagandastaffel (the department of Nazi propaganda) considered abstract art "degenerate" but could not extinguish the new art in Algeria. Even under German occupation (Algeria was under the Vichy Government until the Allies captured Algiers with Operation Torch commencing on the night of 7–8 November 1942) the new art was shown. For example, on 10 May 1941 gallery Brun exhibited "traditional" art side by side with the "modern" works which attracted no comment from Propagandastaffel but after the war was quoted as an act of resistance. After the war there was a "porosity" between Paris and Algeria and many Algerian artists exhibited in Paris

On his return to Algiers, after the Second World War, in 1948, Charlot continued with his interest in art. "Charlot went to show (…) the best Algerian visual art or sculptures and, just as he had naturally made it by written works in the 1940s, in the years 1954-1962 he took up the challenge with canvases by Algerian painters", recounted Jacqueline Moulin. Over decades he would organise in his bookshops, then for the gallery Comte-Tinchant, exhibitions, notably of Nicole Algan, Louis Bénisti, Jean-Pierre Blanche, Charles Brouty, Jacques Burel, Marius de Buzon, Henri Caillet, Henri Chouvet, J.A.R Durand, Sauveur Galliéro, Maria Moresca, Pierre Rafi, René Sintès, Marcel Bouqueton, Maria Manton, Louis Nallard, Jean de Maisonseul, Hacène Benaboura Mohamed Bouzid Rezki Zérarti and others.

After his spell in Paris (1963-5) in ORTF (Office de Radiodiffusion-Télévision Française, which was the national public broadcasting service) he opened the gallery Pilote in Algiers where he again set up exhibitions of young Algerian painters such as Baya, Aksouh and Mohammed Khadda.

== Charlot and radio ==
After his return to Algeria in 1948, in addition to setting up a new bookshop/gallery he continued to publish and edit. He had close links with many who went on to be influential in French Algerian radio such as Marcel Amrouche (later chief editor of Radio-Alger), José Pivin (who had a long radio career in France after years in Algeria) and El Boudali Safir (who created programmes in Arabic and Kabyle but also five musical ensembles and helped set up the National Institute of Music).

Towards the end of the Algerian war Charlot worked with three men who went on to take important posts. Jean Lanzi after a long career ended up as director in information for TF1 (a private national French TV channel). Jean-Claude Hérbelé after being a journalist in Radio-Alger headed Antenne2. Pierre Wiehn spent his whole career in radio ending as director of programmes for France-Inter. For two years in a very delicate situation of decolonisation they broadcast and their broadcasts around the jubilant days of independence were picked up and used by Jules Roy for both French radio and Paris Match After independence Charlot and the three men went their separate ways. The day Charlot arrived in Paris he met with Jean Lescure of the "Research Arm" of ORTF who led him to Pierre Schaeffer, its boss.

Charlot had many ideas, including many that never saw the light of day, such as a programme on Gandhi as a saint and another on less well known masterpieces. Programmes that did get broadcast included a series of material from the archives on the anniversary of events over the previous fifty years. One such was a reflection of Camus in Pataouète (patois of the Pieds-Noirs) on the fourth anniversary of his death. The only reason the material survived was that Camus had made his own recording of it and Charlot had kept it.

However, Schaeffer was at odds with Charlot as he thought Charlot's transmissions lacked mass appeal and as the two men could not in the end see eye to eye Charlot gave up his post and returned to Algiers.

== Posterity ==
In the year following his death (2004) his name was given to the médiathèque of Pézenas where was set up an exhibition of some twenty of his painter friends. A fonds éditorial Edmond Charlot (editorial fund) was created there in 2010 thanks to a significant donation by the famous poet Frédéric Jacques Temple (who Charlot was the first to publish in 1946 – apart from a private edition in 1945 of Seul à bord). Some three hundred and fifty public works of Edmond Charlot, of which a great number had been re-edited by other publishing houses, are today researched by book lovers. Kaouther Adimi wrote a novel, Nos richesses, based on Charlot's bookshop/gallery in Algiers and his literary works which has an English translation as A Bookshop in Algiers.

There is video footage (in French) of an interview with Edmond Charlot taken shortly before his death.

In his obituary, the poet James Kirkup described Edmond Charlot as "a man whose life was devoted to international understanding between Arabs and Europeans; an impassioned bibliophile and literary enthusiast who started the careers of many famous authors. He also defended the idea of "Mediterranean civilisation" as a force for peace and artistic excellence in a world rent asunder by politics and war." His bookshop Les Vraies Richesses is mentioned in a 2022 issue of Geo (in French) on the Algerian war.
