= Adelina Gomes =

Brazilian painter

- Born: 1916; Campos dos Goytacazes, Rio de Janeiro
- Died: 1984 (aged 67–68); Rio de Janeiro
- Occupations: painter, sculptor, florist, artisan
- Style: Oil on canvas, copy in clay modeling plaster

Adelina Gomes (Campos dos Goytacazes, Rio de Janeiro, 1916 — Rio de Janeiro, Rio de Janeiro, 1984) was a Brazilian painter, sculptor, florist, and artisan. As a painter, she created 17,500 works until her death in 1984.

She began painting in 1946 at the Occupational Therapy Section of the Painting and Modeling Studio when psychiatrist Nise da Silveira took over the supervision of that section at the psychiatric center of Pedro II Hospital. During this period, Adelina was undergoing treatment for schizophrenia.

== Biography ==
She was born in 1916 in Campos dos Goytacazes, a city located in the northern region of Rio de Janeiro state. In 1937, when she was 21 years old, due to showing moments of aggression and other psychiatric symptoms, her family decided to admit her to the D. Pedro II Psychiatric Center in the Engenho de Dentro neighborhood of Rio de Janeiro.

Her works can be found in the Museum of Images of the Unconscious.

== Film ==
In 2015, Adelina was one of the characters in the Brazilian feature film Nise: The Heart of Madness, based on the period when psychiatrist Nise da Silveira headed the therapeutic section of the psychiatric center at Pedro II Hospital. In the film, Adelina was hospitalized in the psychiatric hospital for the treatment of schizophrenia. She is then taken by Nise to the Occupational Therapy Section, where she has her first contact with art.
