= Edward Hart =

Edward or Eddie Hart may refer to:

- Ed Hart (1887–1956), American football player
- Eddie Hart (sprinter) (born 1949), American athlete
- Eddie Hart (Australian footballer) (1922–1995), Australian rules footballer
- Edward Hart (goldsmith), 16th century Scottish goldsmith
- Edward Hart (physician) (1911–1986), Scottish physician
- Edward Hart (settler), signer of the Flushing Remonstrance
- Edward Hart (soccer) (1903–1974), American soccer player
- Edward J. Hart (1893–1961), American politician
- Edward L. Hart (1916–2008), poet
- Edward W. Hart (1852–1924), American politician from New York

== See also ==
- Edward Hartt (1825–1883) was a, United States Navy shipbuilder
- Edward H. Harte (1922–2011), American newspaper executive, journalist, philanthropist, and conservationist
