= Museum of Images of the Unconscious =

Museum in Rio de Janeiro, Brazil

Coordinates: 22.9017°S 43.3011°W

Museum of Images from the Unconscious
- Established: May 20, 1952
- Location: Engenho de Dentro, Rio de Janeiro

Museum of Images from the Unconscious (Portuguese: Museu de Imagens do Inconsciente) was inaugurated on May 20, 1952, in the then National Psychiatric Center in the Engenho de Dentro neighborhood of Rio de Janeiro, initiated by psychiatrist Nise da Silveira. It houses approximately 350,000 artworks created by patients with mental disorders through the art therapy practiced by Dr. Nise.

== Foundation ==
Museum was founded on May 20, 1952. Against the invasive treatments prevalent in the 1940s (such as electroshock, lobotomy, insulin therapy), the psychiatrist Nise da Silveira practised treatment through the art therapy within the Occupational Therapy and Rehabilitation Department (STOR) of the psychiatric center. She took over the leadership of the department in 1946 and founded a painting and sculpture studio on September 9, 1946, in an unused administrative area of the complex. At that time, the Psychiatric Center had approximately 1,500 patients, the majority of whom had chronic schizophrenia.

After three months of use by the patients, on December 22 of the same year, the first exhibition were held. In this exhibition, 35 patients had their artworks displayed, with 20 adults and 15 children among them. The exhibition caught the attention of the Ministry of Education, which provided space in its headquarters for the artworks to be exhibited to the interested public. Two months later, on February 4, 1947, second exhibition was held, this time for 245 works by patients-artists. The exhibition was later transferred to the National Museum of Fine Arts.

The third exhibition of occupational therapy work by patients from the National Psychiatric Center took place on October 12, 1949, and brought together 149 artworks at the Museum of Modern Art in São Paulo. It was also featured in the Noble Hall of the City Council between November 25, 1949, and January 10, 1950.

On May 20, 1952, the Museum of Images from the Unconscious was inaugurated by the then director of the center, the neurologist Paulo Elejade. The museum was founded with the purpose of preserving the works produced in the ateliers, which served as a basis for a better understanding of the patients. Through this museum, Nise da Silveira managed to take the discussions of the mental health field. The main one was in Zürich, Switzerland, in 1957, during the II World Congress of Psychiatry, which counted with the presence of Carl Gustav Jung. Besides this exhibition, there were hundreds of others in Brazilian cities and abroad.

It was a "Living Museum", because, besides the works produced, it also housed the creators, since there was a studio inside the museum. The debate between critics Mário Pedrosa and Quirino Campofiorito gave visibility to the museum. Pedrosa called the art produced in the museum "Arte Virgem" and Campofiorito "primitive art". However, both agreed with the relationship between art and mental health.

The Museum's collection includes works by Adelina Gomes (1916–1984), Carlos Pertuis (1916–1977), Fernando Diniz (1918–1999), Emygdio de Barros (1895–1986) and Octávio Inácio, among others.

Due to their artistic and scientific value, eight individual collections, a collection of six authors and another 53,133 works were listed by IPHAN.

In 2015, the Museum of Images from the Unconscious had around 360,000 works, 127,000 of which were listed by the National Historical and Artistic Heritage Institute. Today, the Museum is directed by Luiz Carlos Mello, who worked side by side with the psychiatrist for 26 years. Luiz Carlos is also the author of the book Nise da Silveira: Paths of a Rebellious Psychiatrist.

== Filmography ==
In 1989, Leon Hirszman's film Imagens do Inconsciente was released, which tells about the lives of Adelina Gomes, Fernando Diniz, and Carlos Pertuis, three patients at the National Psychiatric Center.

In addition to this, the story of the museum's foundation is told in the Brazilian feature film entitled Nise: The Heart of Madness, directed by Roberto Berliner. The film was the result of 13 years of extensive research, and is based on life of psychiatrist Nise da Silveira.
