= Jules Roy =

French writer

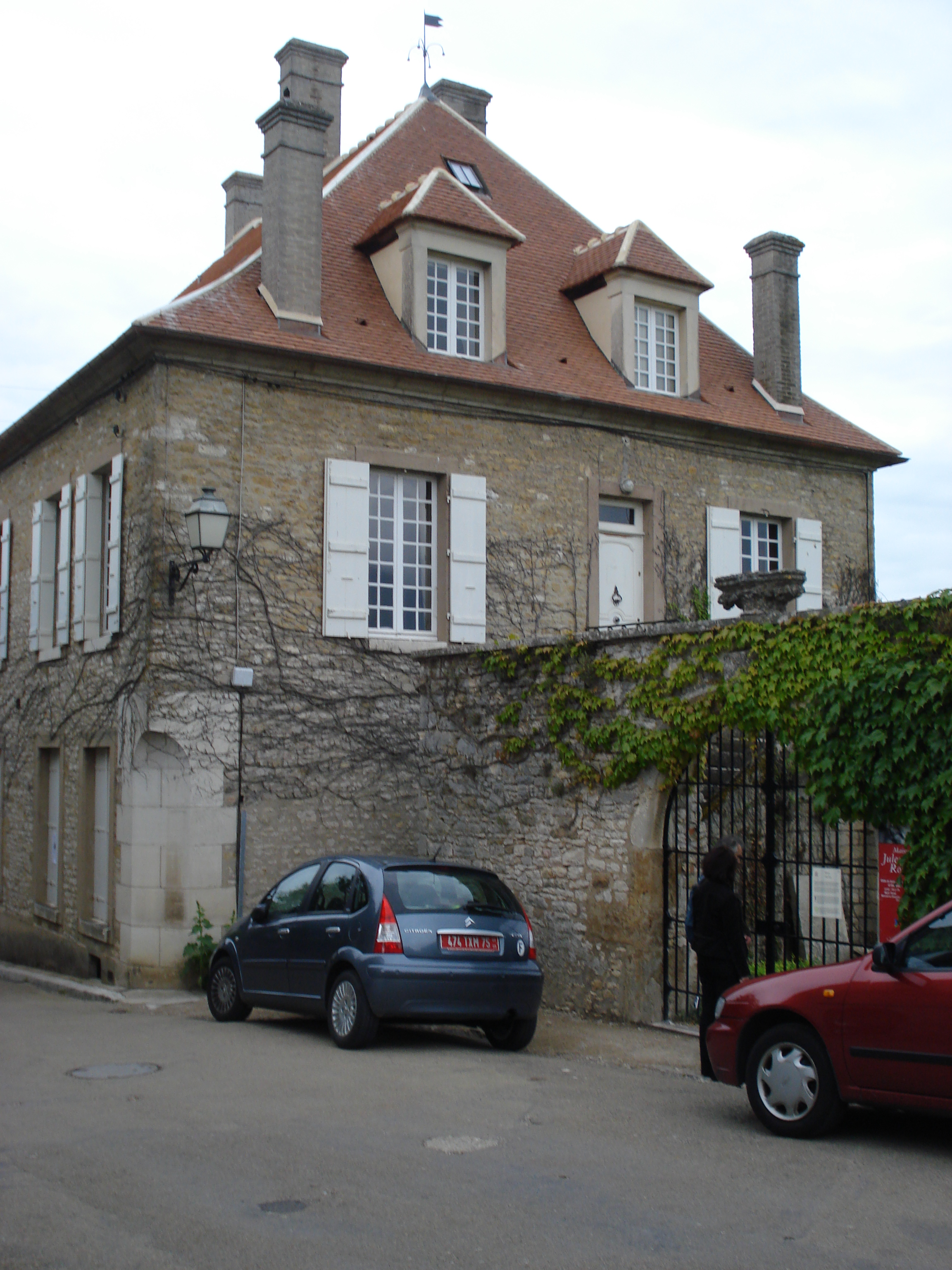

Jules Roy (22 October 1907 – 15 June 2000) was a French writer. "Prolific and polemical" Roy, born an Algerian pied noir and sent to a Roman Catholic seminary, used his experiences in the French colony and during his service in the Royal Air Force during the Second World War as inspiration for a number of his works. He began writing in 1946, while still serving in the military, and continued to publish fiction and historical works after his resignation in 1953 in protest of the First Indochina War. He was an outspoken critic of French colonialism and the Algerian War of Independence and later civil war, as well as a strongly religious man.

== Life and work ==
Like his friend Albert Camus and his first editor Edmond Charlot, Roy was a descendant of white settlers in French Algeria. He was born in Rovigo, Algeria, and spent his childhood on the farm of his maternal grandparents, the Pâris, small landholders who lived near the village of Sidi Moussa, about eight kilometres north of the town. Roy was the fruit of an adulterous liaison between Mathilde Roy, the wife of a policeman, and Henri Dematons, a schoolteacher.

During World War II, Roy commanded a Royal Air Force squadron which was engaged in bombing the Ruhr Basin; he described the missions in La Vallée heureuse (Charlot, 1946). In his memoirs, the journalist Walter Lewino states that when Roy first joined the Free French Forces after the Allied invasion of North Africa, he was sent for flight training to Dumfries, whereupon skills testing the British ignored his captain's rank and designated him a second navigator, making Roy junior under British rules to his pilot let alone squadron leadership. In June 1953 Roy resigned from the army, at the rank of colonel, in protest at the government's policies in the First Indochina War.

His Le Voyage en Chine (Julliard, 1965) recounts the story of a visit to Mao Zedong's China during which he planned to make a film portraying what he had imagined to be the successful transformation of the society, only to be disappointed at the lack of access to real conditions. In 1995, Roy, who had been living in France for many years, returned to Algeria and visited his mother's grave in the small pied noir cemetery at Sidi Moussa. Roy spent the last years of his life in Vézelay, following his interest in the life of Mary Magdalene. He was first married to Mirande Grimal with whom he had two children, Jean-Louis and Genevieve. Following a divorce, he married Tatiana Soukoroukoff in 1965 (she died in 2012). Both children survived him.

== Works ==
Novels

- Le tonnerre et les anges, Éditions Grasset, 1975.
- Le Désert de Retz, Grasset, 1978.
- Les Chevaux du soleil, Grasset, 1980, 6 volumes; one volume edition, Omnibus, 1995.
- La Saison des Za, Grasset, 1982.

Non-fiction

- Ciel et terre, Alger, Charlot, 1943 (épuisé).
- La Vallée heureuse, Charlot, 1946, with a preface by Pierre Jean Jouve; Gallimard, 1948; Éditions Julliard, 1960; Albin Michel, 1989.
- Le Métier des armes, Gallimard, 1948; Julliard, 1960.
- Retour de l'enfer, Gallimard, 1953; Julliard, 1960.
- Le Navigateur, Gallimard, 1954; Julliard, 1960.
- La Femme infidèle, Gallimard, 1955; Julliard, 1960.
- Les Flammes de l'été, Gallimard, 1956; Julliard, 1960; Albin Michel, 1993.
- Les Belles Croisades, Gallimard, 1959; Julliard, 1960.
- La Guerre d'Algérie, Julliard, 1960; Christian Bourgois, 1994.
- La Bataille de Dien Bien Phu, Julliard, 1963; Albin Michel, 1989.
- Le Voyage en Chine, Julliard, 1965.
- La Mort de Mao, Christian Bourgois, 1969; Albin Michel, 1991.
- L'Amour fauve, Grasset, 1971.
- Danse du ventre au-dessus des canons, Flammarion, 1976.
- Pour le lieutenant Karl, Christian Bourgois, 1977.
- Pour un chien, Grasset, 1979.
- Une affaire d'honneur, Plon, 1983.
- Beyrouth viva la muerte, Grasset, 1984.
- Guynemer, l'ange de la mort, Albin Michel, 1986.
- Mémoires barbares, Albin Michel, 1989.
- Amours barbares, Albin Michel, 1993.
- Un après-guerre amoureux, Albin Michel, 1995.
- Adieu ma mère, adieu mon cœur, Albin Michel, 1996.
- Journal, t. 1, Les années déchirement, 1925-1965, Albin Michel, 1997.
- Journal, t. 2, Les années cavalières, 1966-1985, Albin Michel, 1998.
- Journal, t. 3, Les années de braise, 1986-1996, Albin Michel, 1999.
- Lettre à Dieu, Albin Michel, 2001.

Essays

- Comme un mauvais ange, Charlot, 1946; Gallimard, 1960.
- L'Homme à l'épée, Gallimard, 1957; Julliard, 1960.
- Autour du drame, Julliard, 1961.
- Passion et mort de Saint-Exupéry, Gallimard, 1951; Julliard, 1960; La Manufacture, 1987.
- Le Grand Naufrage, Julliard, 1966; Albin Michel, 1995.
- Turnau, Sienne, 1976 (hors commerce).
- Éloge de Max-Pol Fouchet, Actes Sud, 1980.
- Étranger pour mes frères, Stock, 1982.
- Citoyen Bolis, tambour de village, Avallon, Voillot,1989.
- Vézelay ou l'Amour fou, Albin Michel, 1990.
- Rostropovitch, Gainsbourg et Dieu, Albin Michel, 1991.

Poetry

- Trois Pières pour des pilotes, Alger, Charlot, 1942.
- Chants et prières pour des pilotes, Charlot, 1943; Gallimard, 1948; Julliard, 1960.
- Sept Poèmes de ténèbres, Paris, 1957.
- Prière à Mademoiselle Sainte-Madeleine, Charlot, 1984; Bleu du Ciel, Vézelay, 1986.
- Chant d'amour pour Marseille, Jeanne Laffitte, 1988.
- Cinq Poèmes, Avallon, Voillot,1991.
- La nuit tombe, debout camarades !, Gérard Oberlé, 1991.
- Poèmes et prières des années de guerre (1939–1945), Actes Sud, 2001.

Drama

- Beau Sang, Gallimard, 1952; Julliard, 1960.
- Les Cyclones, Gallimard, 1953; Julliard, 1960.
- Le Fleuve rouge, Gallimard, 1957; Julliard, 1960.
- La Rue des Zouaves suivi de Sa Majesté Monsieur Constantin, Julliard, 1970.
- Lieutenant Karl, dramatique télé (Michel Wyn), INA, 1977.
- Mort au champ d'honneur, Albin Michel, 1995.

Pamphlet

- J'accuse le général Massu, Seuil, 1972.

Short story

- L'Œil de loup du roi de Pharan, Sétif, 1945.

Correspondence

- D'une amitié. Correspondance (1937–1962), Édisud, 1985, with the poet Jean Amrouche
