= Emygdio de Barros =

Brazilian painter

- Born: 1895; Paraíba do Sul, Brazil
- Died: May 5, 1986 (aged 90–91); Rio de Janeiro, Brazil
- Occupation(s): painter and draftsman

Emygdio de Barros (or Emígdio de Barros or Emídio de Barros (1895 – May 5, 1986) was a Brazilian painter whose work is associated with the concepts of art brut (Jean Dubuffet's concept) and ‘virgin art’ (Mário Pedrosa's concept). His works were incorporated into the collection of the Museum of Images of the Unconscious, listed by IPHAN.

== Biography ==
Emygdio de Barros was born in 1895 in Paraíba do Sul of Rio de Janeiro state. He entered the technical course of lathe operator and, after its completion, joined the Arsenal de Marinha do Rio de Janeiro.

In the Navy, he stood out for his drawings, and was sent to France, where he took a two-year refresher course. After completing the course and returning to Brazil in 1924, he abandoned his job. Later he was admitted to the Praia Vermelha hospital, diagnosed with schizophrenia.

In 1944, Emygdio de Barros was transferred to the Pedro II Psychiatric Center of the Gustavo Riedel Hospital, located in Engenho de Dentro. Three years later, in February 1947, after more than two decades of internment in different psychiatric institutions, he began to attend the Occupational Therapy Section workshop created by Nise da Silveira at the hospital in Engenho de Dentro. From then on, Emydgio stood out as one of Nise's cameos, a set of painters who were discovered among the hospital inpatients whose work presented a high artistic level, being compared to the French painter Henri Matisse, but who was not recognized because of the prejudice against mental patients that existed at the time. Emydgio's talent had been a discovery of the German painter Almir Mavignier.

Emygdio de Barros produced more than 3,300 paintings, gouaches, and drawings, being classified in the styles art brut, proposed by Jean Dubuffet, ‘virgin art’ by Mário Pedrosa, and concrete art.

== Reception ==
His works, as well as those of other artists, are associated with concrete art from Rio de Janeiro, being from the first exhibitions in the 1940s accepted in the art world, for their remarkable quality. Art critics, such as Mário Pedrosa and Abraham Palatnik, visited him frequently.

The poet, member of the ABL and art critic Ferreira Gullar and one of the main art connoisseurs in the Lusophone world referred to Emygdio de Barros' work in these terms:

Emygdio de Barros is perhaps the only genius of Brazilian painting. A genius is neither worse nor better than anyone else. With respect to him there is no term of comparison: a genius is a dazzling solitude, it surpasses measures and categories. It is not possible to define him according to artistic schools, vanguards, styles, métier. As for Emygdio, we can state that rarely has a pictorial work been able to transmit to us the sensation of amazement that we get from his paintings. There are many works of art of great beauty. There are those that fascinate us by the balance of their elements, by the musicality of their rhythms, as there are others whose strength lies in the contrasts, in the intensity, in the passion. Most of these works participate in a cultural process that informs and reflects them. It is not difficult to catalog them and place them in this or that moment, in this or that trend or school. Emygdio's painting is outside such conditioning and classification.

— Ferreira Gullar (1980)

About Emydgio de Barros' work, the essayist and art critic Mário Pedrosa wrote that:

Emygdio (...) builds his world through color. Creation in this one is by succession; they are layers of imagination that come and go like waves. One can say that he paints from near and imagines from far. His landscapes, even when in the natural, do not copy reality, resulting in forms taken from the place and intertwined with other imaginary elements. These natural motifs, he catches day by day and accumulates them in the magic lantern of his imaginary (...). Emugdio is a sensitive plate. Nothing passes before his retina with pictorial interest without staying. Then, when it is time to transfer these visions to the canvas, the artist does the depuration. He selects within this kaleidoscope, which is his inner imagination, what should and should not be transformed into form and color. It is in this effort of selection that the drama of his elaboration is hidden; the reason for this succession of pictures, so to speak, that he paints one on top of the other, until he finds the final order, plastic relations that satisfy him (...) In his painting, one can neither denote grotesque, nor delirium, nor nightmare, but a poetic force, a lyricism, a metaphysical vigor, humor, a moderate expressionism of a true artist. Emygdio unites the subjective with the objective in a pictorial plot that is always fascinating.

— Mário Pedrosa (1980)

== Main works ==
- Carnival (oil on canvas, 1948);
- Universal (oil on canvas, 1948);
- The Municipal (oil on canvas, 1949).
