= Révolte dans les Asturies =

1935 play by Albert Camus and others

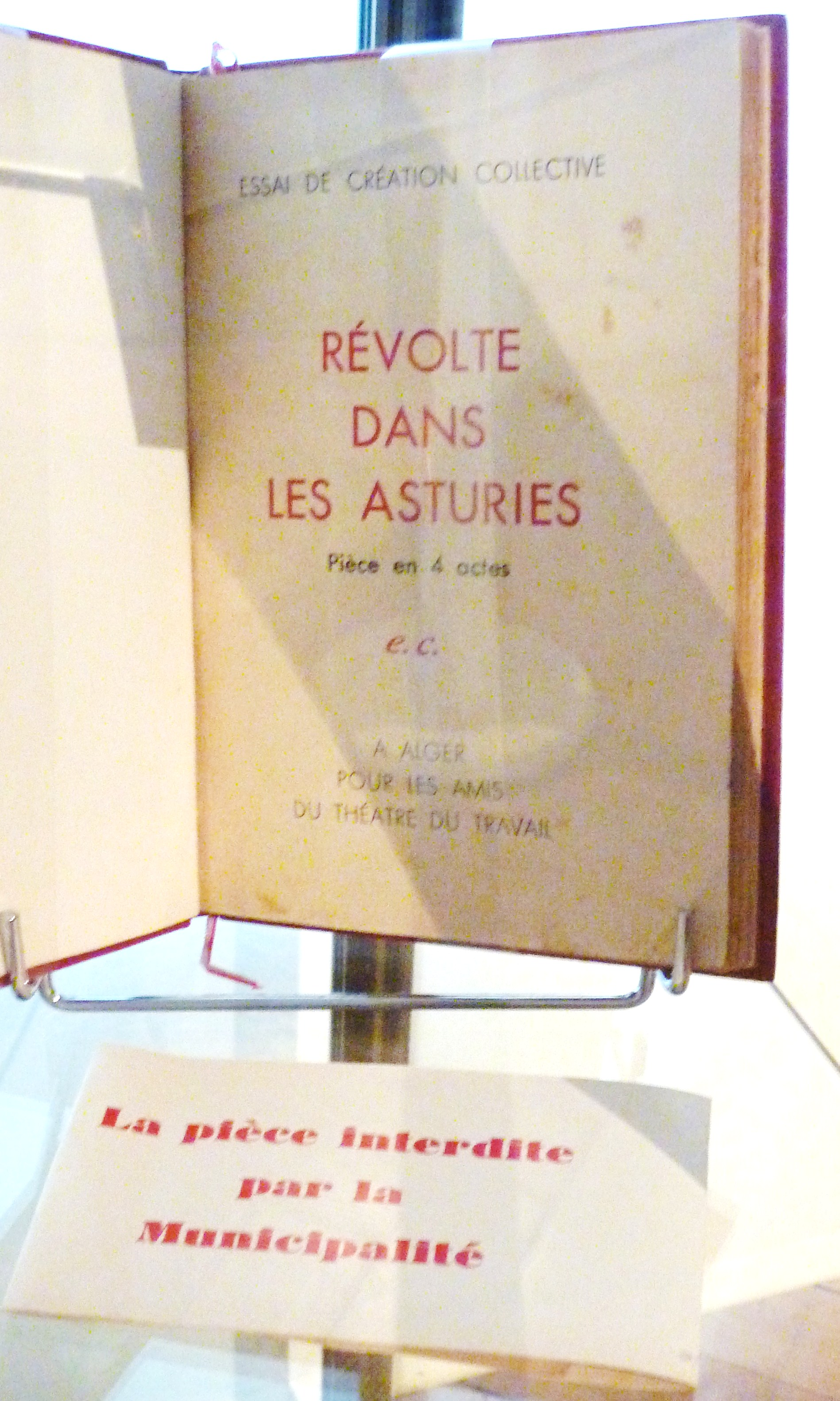

Révolte dans les Asturies ('Revolt in Asturias') with the subtitle collective creation test, is a theatrical play, written collectively by Albert Camus, Jeanne-Paule Sicard, Yves Bourgeois and Alfred Poignant, in 1935. It was published in 1936 by Edmond Charlot. It describes the workers' uprising of 1934 in Asturias.

== Plot ==
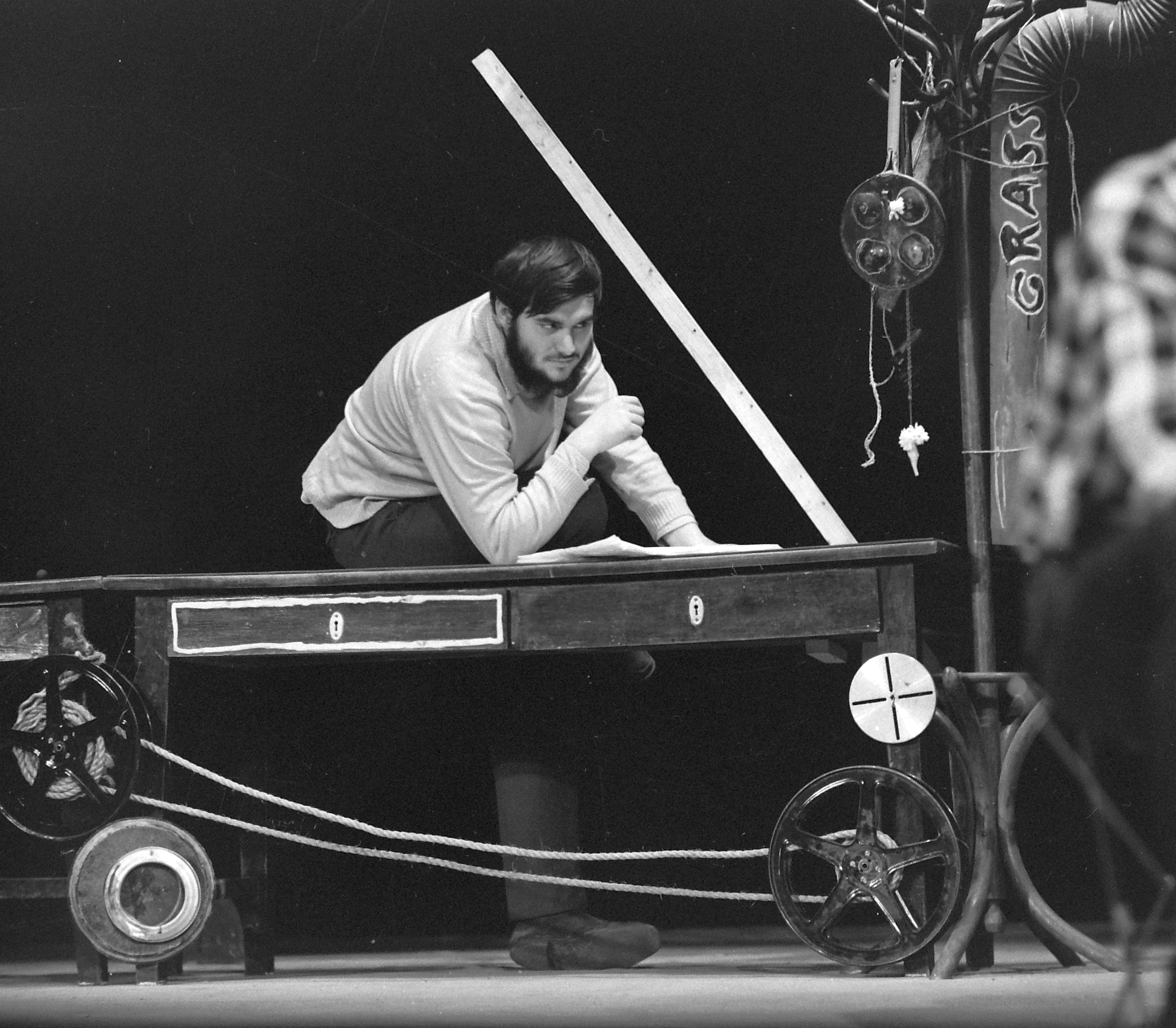
Performance of the play in Hungarian in 1973

Revolt in Asturias describes the workers' insurrection of 1934, in Asturias. The miners' revolt began in Mieres, on the night of October 5, 1934. The center-right government of the second Spanish Republic called in the army. The repression, on October 19, caused between 1,500 and 2,000 victims, including 300 to 400 soldiers. 30,000 laborers were imprisoned.
