= Bill Nairn =

Canadian football player

Profile
- Positions: Guard, Tackle

Personal information
- Born: November 16, 1912; Winnipeg, Manitoba, Canada
- Died: May 12, 1986 (aged 73); Winnipeg, Manitoba, Canada
- Listed weight: 220 lb (100 kg)

Career history
- 1936–1940: Winnipeg Blue Bombers

Awards and highlights
- Grey Cup champion (1939)

William Nairn (November 16, 1912 – May 12, 1986) was a Canadian professional football player who played for the Winnipeg Blue Bombers. He won the Grey Cup with them in 1939. He is a member of the Blue Bombers Hall of Fame and Manitoba Sports Hall of Fame. After his retirement from football he became an official in the WIFU. He died while playing golf in Winnipeg in 1986.
