= Lorenzo Minio-Paluello =

Italian philologist

Lorenzo Minio-Paluello, FBA (21 September 1907 – 6 May 1986) was an Italian academic, linguist and translator. He was involved in analysing and translating medieval Latin versions of the ancient Greek philosophical texts. From 1939, he worked in England.

== Early life, education and librarianship in Italy ==
Born in 1907 in Belluno, he belonged to old patrician family, though his father Michelangelo Minio was a science teacher and later a curator at the Natural History Museum of Venice. His mother was Ersilia Bisson. He attended the Ginnasio-Liceo Foscarini, where he studied classics and developed an aptitude for languages. He then attended the University of Padua, graduating in 1929, after which he worked as an assistant librarian at the university, and studied philosophy and Semitic languages at the Sorbonne and Ecole des Hautes Etudes in Paris.

== Academic career in Italy and England ==
In 1930, the Fascist government in Italy made all academic appointees swear loyalty to the regime. Minio-Paluello refused and was subsequently forced to leave his post in the library in 1932, after which time he worked as a private tutor. During this time, he also became involved in Aristoteles Latinus, a project to describe medieval Latin translations of the ancient Greek philosopher Aristotle's works. In 1938, he married Magda Ungar, but she being foreign and Jewish, their marriage was not recognised by the state, so in 1939 they immigrated to England, after Sir David Ross invited him to Oxford.

As The Times noted, Minio-Paluello was "one of the foremost scholars to leave Italy in the 1940s [sic] in disgust at the Fascist régime". His talents were soon noticed. He helped Raymond Klibansky with the Corpus Platonicum, which involved studying the medieval translations of Plato's works. He also wrote a book on Fascist Italy's higher education system, which was printed in 1946. From 1940, he studied for a doctorate at Oriel College, Oxford, which was eventually awarded in 1947. That year, he was appointed a fellow at the Warburg Institute and in 1948 he was appointed to a lectureship in medieval philosophy at the University of Oxford. In 1956, he was promoted to a readership there, which he held until 1975; he was also a professorial fellow at Oriel College from 1962 until 1975. In the meantime, Minio-Paluello edited numerous medieval translations of Greek philosophical works, such as Boethius's versions of Aristotle's Categoriae and De Interpretatione (1949) and Moerbeke's Poetics (1952); he translated the Analytica Posteriora (1954) and compiled Twelfth Century Logic: Text and Studies (2 vols., 1956–58). He resumed work on Aristoteles Latinus, working with Ezio Franceschini to produce the second volume of the series (Codices, 1955) and a supplement (1961); he became director of the project in 1959. In that role, he oversaw the publication of five volumes of medieval Latin translations of Aristotele's philosophical texts.

Minio-Paluello's work on editing the second volume of the Aristoteles Latinus series was his most important contribution to scholarship and, two years after its publication, he was elected a fellow of the British Academy (in 1957). He was later elected to the American Philosophical Society in 1971. He died on 6 May 1986.
