= Mirko Javornik =

- Born: September 26, 1909; Cerknica, Slovenia
- Died: May 1, 1986 (aged 76); Washington, D.C.
- Occupations: editor, translator
- Years active: 1929–1986

Mirko Javornik (September 26, 1909, Cerknica – May 1, 1986, Washington, D.C.) was a Slovene writer, editor, and translator.

== Life ==
After Javornik graduated from high school in Ljubljana in 1929, he studied Slavic studies and law. He worked as a freelance writer, and in 1935 he became the chief editor of the newspaper Slovenski dom (The Slovene Home). He left Slovenia after the Second World War for political reasons. He worked in Austria and then in Rome as an official translator for the American and British military authorities, and then as the editor for political reports on Slovenian broadcasts by Radio Trieste. In 1961 he emigrated to the United States and was employed by the American government as a language specialist and a member of the PR service for visitors from Yugoslavia.

== Literary work ==
Javornik's literary production includes the following works:

- Črni breg: povest (The Black Shore: A Tale, 1933), dealing with social issues
- Srečanje z nepoznanimi: knjiga o potih in o ljudeh (Encounter with the Unknown: A Book on Travels and People, 1934), journalism
- Pomlad v Palestini: potopis (Spring in Palestine: A Travelogue, 1935)
- Črne bukve: o delu komunistične Osvobodilne fronte proti slovenskemu narodu (The Black Book: The Work of the Communist Liberation Front against the Slovene Nation, 1944, reprinted 1990)
- Mož božje volje: dr. Lambert Ehrlich (A Man of God's Will: Dr. Lambert Ehrlich, 1952)
- Pero in čas (The Pen and Time, 1944), a collection of prewar works
- Pero in čas II (The Pen and Time 2, 1980)

Javornik also wrote radio plays and translated from English, Italian, German, and Spanish.

== Political activity ==
During the German occupation of Yugoslavia, Javornik transformed the newspaper Slovenski dom into a militantly anti-Communist publication that supported the Slovene Home Guard and General Leon Rupnik. Together with other editors of Slovenski dom he prepared and published the volume Črne bukve: o delu komunistične Osvobodilne fronte proti slovenskemu narodu (The Black Book: The Work of the Communist Liberation Front against the Slovene Nation) in 1944, which details crimes committed by the Liberation Front.
