= George Thompson (Australian footballer) =

Australian rules footballer, born 1906

Personal information
- Full name: George Thompson
- Born: 30 May 1906
- Died: 23 May 1986 (aged 79)
- Original team: Castlemaine
- Height: 183 cm (6 ft 0 in)
- Weight: 83 kg (183 lb)

Playing career^{1}
Years	Club	Games (Goals)
1929	Footscray	1 (0)
- ^{1} Playing statistics correct to the end of 1929.

George Thompson (30 May 1906 – 23 May 1986) was an Australian rules footballer who played with Footscray in the Victorian Football League (VFL).
