= Esther Van Wagoner Tufty =

American journalist (1896–1986)

- Born: 1896
- Died: 1986 (aged 89–90)
- Occupation: Journalist
- Relatives: Murray Van Wagoner

Esther Van Wagoner Tufty (July 2, 1896 – May 4, 1986) was an American journalist whose career spanned six decades.

== Early life and education ==
Esther Van Wagoner Tufty was born on July 2, 1896, in Kingston, Michigan, the daughter of James Van Wagoner and Florence (Loomis) Van Wagoner. She was the sister of Michigan governor Murray Van Wagoner. Raised in Pontiac, Michigan, she attended Michigan State College in 1914 but, preferring its journalism school, graduated from the University of Wisconsin Madison with a BA in journalism in 1921.

Immediately out of high school, Tufty began working for her local newspaper, the Pontiac Press, as an assistant society editor for $7.50 a week. While attending the University of Wisconsin, she worked for the Madison Democrat and Capitol Times. She and her husband moved to Chicago, where joined the Evanston News-Index and eventually became its managing editor.

In 1935, her husband was hired by the Federal Radio Commission and they moved to Washington, D.C. Her brother suggested she start her own news bureau for Michigan newspapers, and she founded the Tufty News Bureau that year. The Bureau initially served 26 papers in Michigan and at its height served over 300 across the United States. She became a fixture in Washington journalism for decades, covering every U.S. president from Franklin D. Roosevelt to Ronald Reagan. She earned the nickname "Duchess", which was often attributed to her height and regal bearing or coronet of braids, but actually originated when a European innkeeper mistook her for another guest arriving that day.

Tufty began working as a radio journalist during World War II, with the 15-minute program Headlines from Washington on the Atlantic Coast Network. Starting in 1952, she was a radio and television correspondent for NBC and had her own radio program, Tufty Topics. Early in her radio career, she was nicknamed the "headache girl" because her program was sponsored by St. Joseph Aspirin.

Tufty also covered the Korean War and the Vietnam War. During the Berlin Airlift, she flew into the city on top of 10 tons of coal. During Vietnam, she was travelling in a helicopter that was struck by enemy fire. When she returned from Vietnam, the 70-year old Tufty quipped "It's my third war, not counting marriage."

In April 1954, she was sent on a speaking tour to Australia by the US State Department. When she complained she had seen no kangaroos, the Lord Mayor of Perth presented her with a female kangaroo called Topsy. When Topsy was shipped to America, she was accompanied by a male kangaroo. Tufty said "I want to call him Turvey," but instead the kangaroo was dubbed Digger. Tufty donated the pair of kangaroos to the National Zoo.

Tufty served as President of the American Women in Radio and Television, the American Newspaper Women's Club, and the Women's National Press Club, and was the only woman to serve as president of all three organizations. She was the first woman to join the National Press Club in 1971 when it finally opened to women.

== Later life and death ==
Tufty suffered a number of serious injuries and illnesses over the years, including breast cancer, a broken leg that forced her to walk with a cane, the loss of an eye, and the installation of seven pacemakers. Despite this, she continued to work into her 80s from an office in the National Press Building and was thought to be the oldest working reporter in Washington, D.C. She stopped working following a stroke in December 1985. She died in the Mount Vernon Nursing Home in Alexandria, Virginia, at the age of 89.

== Personal life ==
Esther Van Wagoner married Harold Guilford Tufty, an electrical engineer, in September 1921. They had two children, Harold Guilford Tufty Jr. (born in 1922) and James Tufty (born in 1929). They divorced in 1947.
