= Harry Owen (rugby league, born 1905) =

Australian rugby league player

Personal information
- Born: 7 July 1905; Manchester, England
- Died: 19 May 1986 (aged 80); Haberfield, NSW, Australia

Playing information
- Position: Halfback
Club
Years	Team	Pld	T	G	FG	P
1926–33	Western Suburbs	34	10	27	0	84
Representative
Years	Team	Pld	T	G	FG	P
1927–31	New South Wales	10	0	10	0	20

Harry Owen (7 July 1905 – 19 May 1986) was an Australian rugby league player.

== Biography ==
The youngest of 10 siblings, Owen was born in Manchester, England, and moved to the Sydney suburb of Burwood as a young child in 1913. He adopted the nickname "Pommy" due to his English origins.

Owen came through the Western Suburbs Junior League, playing with Concord and Burwood. He captained Western Suburbs in the President's Cup and played first-grade between 1926 and 1933, as a halfback and occasional five-eighth. After becoming New South Wales halfback in 1927, Owen spent his next two seasons with Western Suburbs largely restricted to the reserves, then in 1930 left for a season at Temora. He resumed at Western Suburbs in 1931 and had a good enough season to gain selection as New South Wales captain. His name was subsequently in the conversation for the national team, before a broken ankle caused him to miss the entire 1932 season.
