= Hacène Benaboura =

Algerian painter (1898–1960)

- Born: 1898; Algiers, French Algeria
- Died: 1960 (aged 61–62); Algiers, French Algeria
- Known for: Painting

Hacène Benaboura (1898-1960) was an Algerian artist. He is considered to be one of the "forefathers of Algerian modern painting". In 1957 he was the recipient of Algeria's Grand Prize for Art.

== Personal life ==
Benaboura was born in Algiers in 1898. His family was of Turkish origin.
