= John Austin Victoreen =

American scientist (1902-1986)

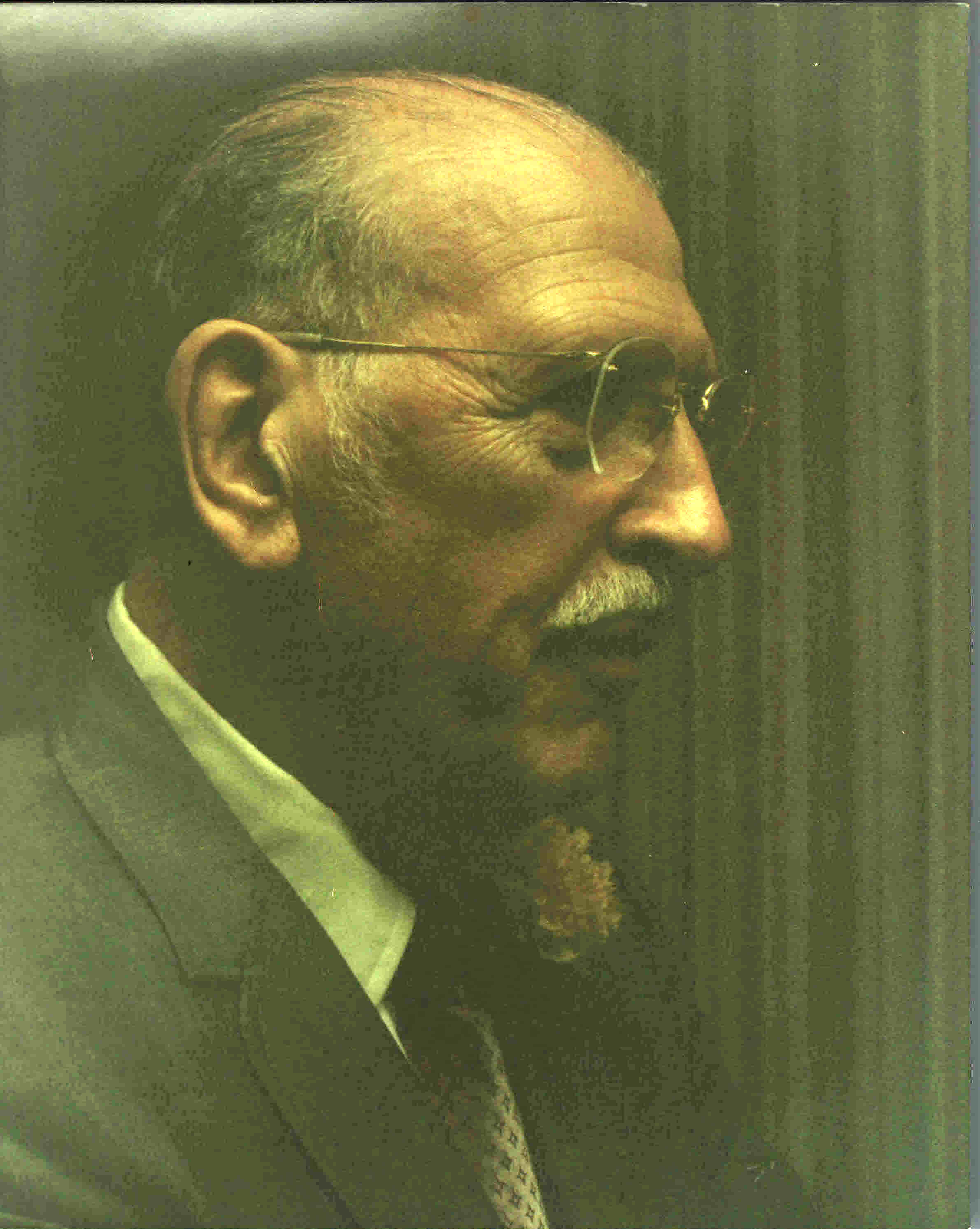
- Born: 4 July 1902; Johnstown, Pennsylvania, US
- Died: 5 May 1986 (aged 83); Maitland, Florida, US
- Other name: Jack Victoreen
- Awards: Honorary Degree Legum Doctor (LLD); John Carroll University, (1949)
- Scientific career
- Fields: Physics; Radiometry; Otology

Notes
- Member of American Acoustic Society

John Austin Victoreen (July 4, 1902 – May 5, 1986) was a self-taught physicist, engineer, inventor and otologist. He founded the Victoreen Instrument Company and was the author of two books, various technical papers on radiation and sound waves, and holder of over 30 patents.

== Career ==
=== Amateur Radio ===
Victoreen began his career in Cleveland, Ohio as a radio and radio parts manufacturer in the early 1920s ( QSL card 8ACH ) . At age 23 he had already received the first of many patents, this one for a high frequency tuning device that could be used in systems with radio frequency amplifiers of constant frequency. He had started a radio parts business and became interested in designing and building high quality radio receivers, some of which still exist today. His Heterodyne was considered by some to be the "Rolls-Royce" of radios.

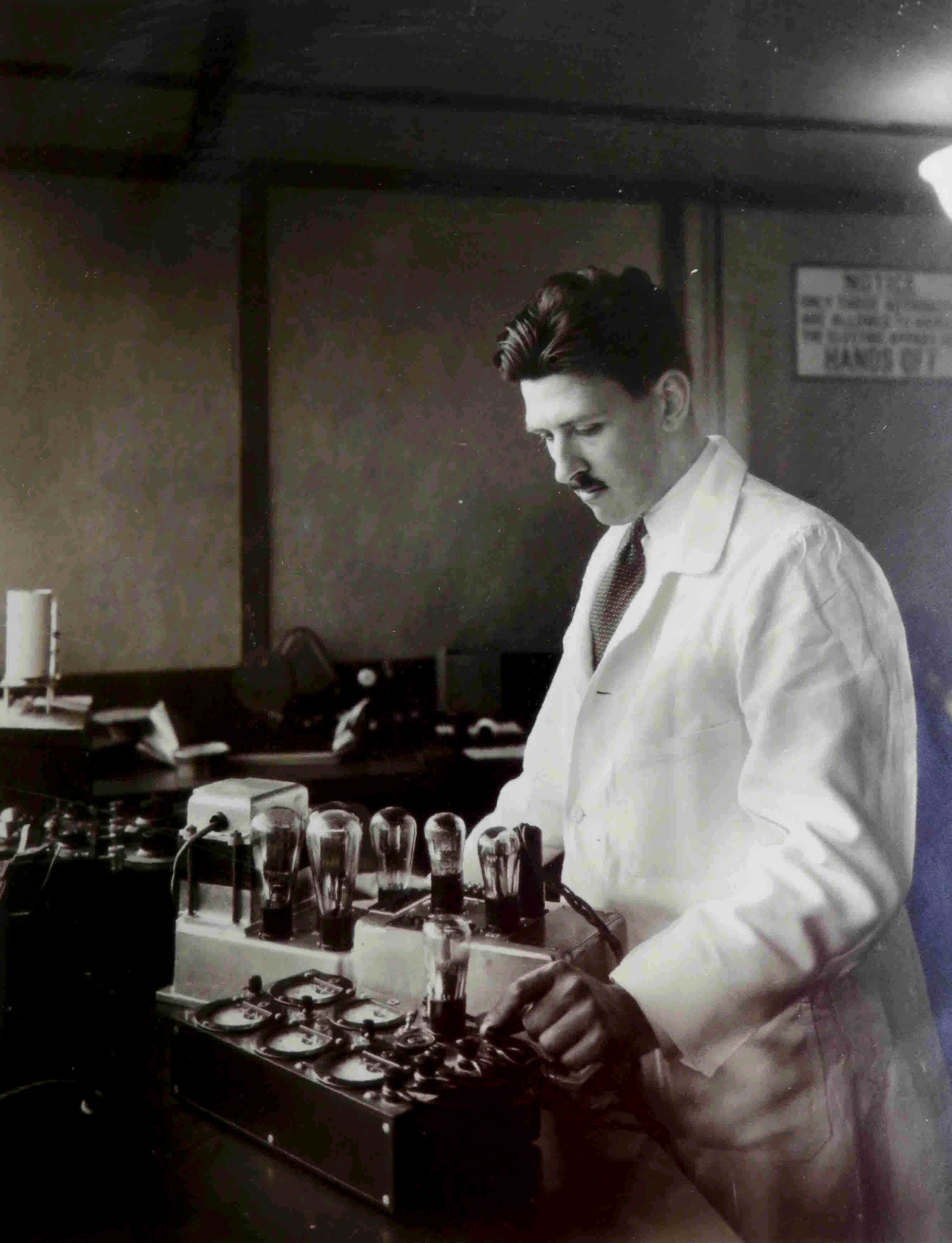

=== Radiation Measurement ===
His interest soon turned to radiation measurement. In 1928 he founded the Victoreen Instrument Company in Cleveland Heights, OH and began to manufacture an x-ray dosimeter invented by Hugo Fricke and Otto Glasser. The first commercial model was the Condenser-R meter, which accurately measured the intensity and total dosage of X-ray exposure, and he gained international fame for this. He also developed other radiation measurement devices and his company provided 95% of the instrumentation for the Bikini atomic tests after World War II. His company was considered to be the "first nuclear company". During World War II, Victoreen was contracted by the Manhattan Project to develop portable radiation devices as part of the highly secret Operation Peppermint project leading up to D-Day.

=== Otology ===
Victoreen moved to Colorado Springs in 1950 and was on the staff as a consulting physicist at the Medical Center there. His interest in audio power amplification and frequency response led him into the field of otology and otometry. He moved from Colorado Springs to Maitland, FL in 1962

== Personal life ==
Victoreen was born to Ernest and Anne (Austin) Victoreen in 1902. He married Francis S. Shima, and they had two children: Jacqueline Ann (later Weir) and Robert Roy. Francis died in 1968 and he was remarried to Lizzie Louise (Bush) Sturges Feb 11, 1970.

== Publications ==
Books

- Hearing Enhancement (1960)
- Basic Principles of Otometry (1973)

White Papers and Journal Articles

- Probable X-Ray Mass Absorption Coefficients for Wave-Lengths Shorter than the K Critical Absorption Wave-Length
- The Thimble Ionization Chamber
- The Absorption of Incident Quanta by Atoms as Defined by the Mass Photoelectric Absorption Coefficient
  and the Mass Scattering Coefficient
- Ionization Chambers
- The Calculation of X-Ray Mass Absorption Coefficients
- Electrometer Tubes for the Measurement of Small Currents
- Roentgen Rays: Measurement of Quality
- Equal Loudness Pressures Determined with a Decaying Oscillatory Waveform
- The Role of Transient-Induced Reverberations in Electro-Acoustical Speech Amplifier Systems
- Correction Factors for Barometric Pressure and Temperature as Applied to X-Ray Measuring Devices Calibrated in International Roentgens

== Patents ==
Source- USPTO

- 4,109,116 Hearing Aid Receiver With Plural Transducers August 22, 1978
- 3,814,864 Condenser Microphone Having a Plurality of Discrete Vibratory Surfaces June 4, 1974
- 3,755,755 Audio Oscillator for Generating Either C.W., Damped Wave Trains, or Narrow Band Noise August 28, 1973
- 3,652,953 Audio Oscillator for Generating Either C.W., Damped Wave Trains, or Narrow Band Noise March 28, 1972
- 3,602,654 Hydraulically Expandable Earpiece August 31, 1971
- 3,478,840 Sound Reproducer November 18, 1969
- 3,408,460 Method and Apparatus for Testing Hearing October 29, 1968
- 3,118,023 Transducer Hearing and Coupling January 14, 1964
- 3,073,900 Method and Apparatus for Determining Hearing Characteristics May 16, 1958/January 15, 1963
- 2,989,597 High Fidelity Soundtranslating Apparatus June 20, 1961
- 2,876,360 Apparatus for the Comparison of Sources of Radiation March 3, 1959
- 2,756,346 Pocket Ionization Chamber Oct 6, 1950/July 24, 1956
- 2,728,005 Gaseous Discharge Tube March 9, 1949/December 20, 1955 (Cleveland OH)
- 2,728,004 Glow Tube December 20, 1955 w/ J. Eddleston
- 2,666,801 Electric Battery and Method of Making Same Jan 19, 1954
- 2,600,817 Method and Apparatus for Assorting, Recording, or Computing June 17, 1952
- 2,587,254 Indicating Pocket Ionization Chamber February 26, 1952
- 2,574,000 Ionization and Vacuum Tube Chamber November 6, 1951
- 2,573,999 Ionization Chamber November 6, 1951
- 2,542,440 Geiger Tube February 20, 1951 W/ R. Barton
- 2,540,063 Coin Detecting and Indicating Apparatus January 30, 1951
- 2,521,315 Geiger Tube September 5, 1950
- 2,507,743 Method and Apparatus for Recording or Indicating May 16, 1950
- 2,462,441 Vacuum Tube with Filamentory Cathode February 22, 1949
- 2,456,094 Method and Apparatus for Regulating Water Temperature December 14, 1948
- 2,416,599 Resistor and Method of Making the Same November 5, 1943/February 25, 1947
- 2,314,060 Electrical Apparatus March 16, 1943
- 2,235,268 Potential Measuring Apparatus September 12, 1938 March 18, 1941
- 2,190,200 X-Ray Measuring Instrument February 13, 1940
- 2,162,412 Potential Measuring Apparatus June 13, 1939
- 1,703,912 Audio Frequency Transformer March 5, 1929
- 1,674,934 Coil and Method of Making Same June 26, 1928
- 1,589,308 Radio Frequency Apparatus April 30, 1926
