= Ivan Corry =

Australian rules footballer, born 1907

Personal information
- Full name: Ivan Edwin Brian Corry
- Born: 21 July 1907; Shepparton, Victoria
- Died: 8 May 1986 (aged 78); Landsborough, Queensland
- Original team: Rupanyup
- Height: 182 cm (6 ft 0 in)

Playing career^{1}
Years	Club	Games (Goals)
1926; 1932	Hawthorn	6 (2)
- ^{1} Playing statistics correct to the end of 1932.

Ivan Edwin Brian Corry (21 July 1907 – 8 May 1986) was an Australian rules footballer who played with Hawthorn in the Victorian Football League (VFL).

== Early life ==
The son of police sergeant William James Corry (1866–1945) and Rose Florence Corry, nee Brien (1872–1966), Ivan Corry Edwin Brian Corry was born at Shepparton on 21 July 1907 and grew up in the area.

== Football ==
Corry joined Hawthorn from Rupanyup at the start of the 1926 VFL season and after playing for the reserves for some weeks he made his debut against Carlton in Round 12 when as many as a dozen regular players were injured. Corry played another senior game two weeks later but then returned to the reserves.

A journalist by profession, from 1927 to 1932 Corry represented Press Football Club in the Wednesday League and won that league's best and fairest award in 1932. He also played with South Melbourne seconds before reappearing for Hawthorn late in the 1932 VFL season when he played four more matches. His senior career ended with six losses from the six games he played.

== Later life ==
Ivan Corry married Phyllis Jean Dingle in 1934 and they lived in the Albert Park area until her death in 1967.

Corry subsequently moved to Queensland where he resided until his death at Landsborough in 1986. He is buried at Caloundra Cemetery.
