= George Chapman (cricketer) =

Australian cricketer

Personal information
- Born: 21 April 1904; Sydney, Australia
- Died: 22 May 1986 (aged 82); Sydney, Australia
- Source: ESPNcricinfo, 24 December 2016

George Chapman (21 April 1904 – 22 May 1986) was an Australian cricketer. He played one first-class match for New South Wales in 1924/25.

== See also ==
- List of New South Wales representative cricketers
