= Jean-Pierre Hagnauer =

French ice hockey player

- Born: 24 February 1913 Paris, France
- Died: 7 May 1986 (aged 73) Montpellier, France
- National team: France

Jean-Pierre Eugène Hagnauer (24 February 1913 – 7 May 1986) was a French ice hockey player. He competed in the men's tournament at the 1936 Winter Olympics.
