= Sydney Santall =

English cricketer

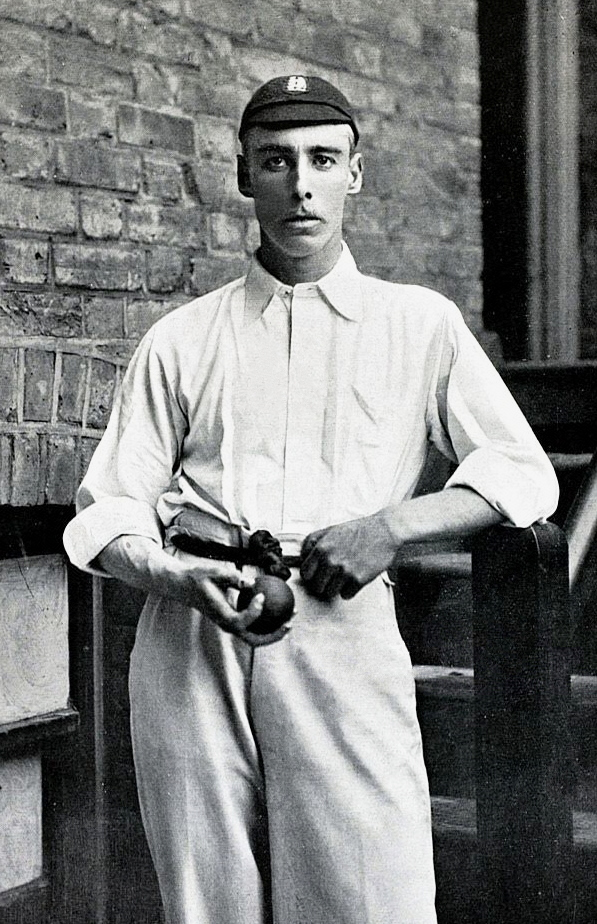
- Santall pictured in about 1896

Cricket information
- Batting: Right-handed
- Bowling: Right-arm medium

Career statistics
Competition	First-class
Matches	374
Runs scored	6,516
Batting average	15.51
100s/50s	0/17
Top score	73
Balls bowled	71,567
Wickets	1,220
Bowling average	23.97
5 wickets in innings	64
10 wickets in match	5
Best bowling	8/23
Catches/stumpings	167/–
- Source: CricketArchive, 12 April 2023

Sydney Santall (10 June 1873 – 19 March 1957) was an English first-class cricketer who played with Warwickshire. His son Reg was later a prolific run maker for them while his other son John had a brief career at Worcestershire.

Santall was a right-arm medium pace bowler and took 1207 wickets for Warwickshire during his 20-year career. His tally remained a county record until surpassed by Eric Hollies in 1949.
