= Reg Santall =

English cricketer

Frederick Reginald Santall (12 July 1903 – 3 November 1950) was an English cricketer. He was a right-hand batsman and right-arm medium pace bowler who played for Warwickshire.

Born in Acocks Green, Birmingham, Santall was a regular on the Warwickshire teamsheet during the inter-war period. Between 1919 and 1939 he played 496 first-class matches for his home county, only Willie Quaife and Dennis Amiss have represented Warwickshire more often. Outside of county cricket he made four other first-class appearances, three came on Sir Theodore Brinckman's XI tour of Argentina in 1937–38 and one was for Sir Lindsay Parkinson's XI against the West Indies tourists of 1933, he scored 45 and 47 not out in a low-scoring match.

Santall scored a total of 17,730 first-class runs at an average of 24.93, passing 1,000 runs in a season on seven occasions. His best seasonal total came in 1933 when he scored 1,727 runs at 46.67. During that season he produced the highest score of his career, a knock of 201 not out against Northamptonshire at Peterborough, an innings that took just 165 minutes.

Santall's medium pace bowling took 283 wickets at an average of 43.31, twice taking five-fers, both of which came in the 1936 season. His best figures were 5/47 against Leicestershire at Edgbaston.

Santall received a benefit in 1935, his playing career was brought to a close by the Second World War. After leaving Warwickshire he coached schools in Reading and Cheltenham, where he died aged 47 after suffering a thrombosis.

Santall's father, Sydney, and brother, John, both played first-class cricket.
