= Władysław Masłowski =

Wladyslaw Maslowski
- Born: 8 November 1933; Katowice, Poland
- Died: 24 April 1986 (aged 52); Kraków, Poland
- Education: Jagiellonian University
- Occupations: Journalist, press researcher
- Known for: Underground weekly Mala Polska

Władysław Masłowski (8 November 1933 – 24 May 1986) was a Polish journalist and a press researcher. He was a founder and editor-in-chief of the underground weekly, Mala Polska, which was instrumental in helping to organize the Solidarity movement in southern Poland.

== History ==
Although he was born in Katowice where his father Stanislaw worked as the Katowice Bank Director, he spent most of his life in Kraków. Once the Nazis and the Soviets invaded Poland in September 1939, and Stanislaw Masłowski was murdered by Soviet NKVD in Katyn, Władysław's family moved back to Kraków to join other family members who were running a pharmacy store, still in existence today, at 4 Mikolajska Street.

A graduate of the Jagiellonian University Law School in Kraków (1955), Masłowski began his career as a journalist for the daily newspaper Echo Krakowa (1955–1965), and later as a researcher (1968–1981) and a head of the Analysis of the Press Content Department at the Press Research Center in Kraków (1982–1986). Also a member of the editorial college for Zeszyty Prasoznawcze, the oldest Polish scholarly journal devoted to media and communication research, he was the author of over 40 peer-reviewed articles in this field. He was co-founder and chairman of the Press Club at the Polish Journalists Association.

Masłowski was a respected expert on shorthand writing, the author of many publications on phoneme fusion and word frequency in the Polish language, a co-author (with Krystyna Walaszkowa and Władysław Szostak) of a shorthand writing manual based on the Polanski system. In 1967 he initiated research on the frequency dictionary of the Polish language used by journalists, as such texts were most commonly shorthand written. In this way, the idea of the frequency dictionary of the Polish language came into being, which, in 1972, led to the publication of The Dictionary of the Contemporary Polish Journalism (Slownictwo Wspolczesnej Publicystyki Polskiej). The culmination of this long-term project was the publication of The Frequency Dictionary of the Contemporary Polish Language (Slownik Frekwencyjny Polszczyzny Wspolczesnej), authored by Ida Kurcz, Andrzej Lewicki, Jadwiga Sambor, Krzysztof Szafran, and Jerzy Woronczak, published in 1990 by the Polish Language Institute at the Polish Academy of Sciences.

After the 1980 strikes at Gdańsk Shipyard, Masłowski participated in organizing Independent Self-Governing Trade Union “Solidarity” at the Press Research Center in Kraków. After the martial law in Poland (1981) he remained active in the Solidarity underground movement. He was a founder, an editor-in-chief, and a publisher of the Kraków underground weekly Mala Polska. He cooperated closely on this project with Władysław Tyranski and Ewa Rylko, who continued editing and publishing Mala Polska after Masłowski's untimely death on 24 April 1986. He edited 154 issues, out of 291, which were published between the years of 1983 and 1989.

Masłowski was also an editor-in-chief of the underground monthly The Contemporary Archives (Archiwum Wspolczesne) which documented Polish everyday life of the Solidarity movement era. Eight issues were published between June 1984 and June 1985.

In the fall of 1985 Masłowski was arrested by the Polish Secret Police. The details of his arrest by the authorities will be released by the Institute of National Remembrance after Maria Masłowska, Masłowski's widow, requested to make these records public.

Władysław Masłowski was buried in a family vault on the Rakowicki Cemetery.

Masłowski enjoyed being a scoutmaster and a Beskids guide actively engaged in the Polish Tourist Sight-Seeing Society (PTTK).
