= Josimo Morais Tavares =

Josimo Morais Tavares (Marabá, 1953 – May 10, 1986, Imperatriz) was a Catholic priest and coordinator of the Comissão Pastoral da Terra. He was assassinated by ranchers in an area which is now part of the Brazilian state of Tocantins, because of his support for the rights of rural workers.
