= Henry Sprinks =

English cricketer

Personal information
- Full name: Henry Robert James Sprinks
- Born: 19 August 1905; Alexandria, Egypt
- Died: 23 May 1986 (aged 80); Bramshaw, Hampshire, England
- Batting: Right-handed
- Bowling: Right-arm fast

Domestic team information
- Years: Team
- 1925–1929: Hampshire

Career statistics
Competition	First-class
Matches	21
Runs scored	167
Batting average	9.27
100s/50s	–/–
Top score	40
Balls bowled	2,082
Wickets	29
Bowling average	46.13
5 wickets in innings	–
10 wickets in match	–
Best bowling	4/56
Catches/stumpings	14/–
- Source: Cricinfo, 23 January 2010

Henry Robert James Sprinks MBE (19 August 1905 — 23 May 1986) was an English first-class cricketer and Royal Air Force Volunteer Reserve officer.

Sprinks was born in August 1905 at Alexandria, in what was then the Khedivate of Egypt. He played his club cricket in Southampton for Deanery Cricket Club, where his performances earned him a trial at Hampshire. His debut in first-class cricket came for Hampshire against Essex at Southend-on-Sea in the 1925 County Championship. He played first-class cricket for Hampshire until 1929, making 21 appearances. Playing in the Hampshire side as a right-arm fast bowler, he took 29 wickets at an average of 46.13, with best figures of 4 for 56. As a lower order batsman, he scored 167 runs at a batting average of 9.27 and a highest score of 40. It was noted by Wisden that "at times he suggested possibilities", alluding to what it viewed as unfulfilled potential.

Outside of cricket, he also played rugby union for Isle of Wight club side Ryde. Sprinks served in the Second World War with the Royal Air Force Volunteer Reserve, being commissioned into the Administrative and Special Duties Branch as a flying officer in August 1940, with confirmation in the rank following in July 1941. He was made a temporary flight lieutenant in September 1942, before being granted the war substantive rank of squadron leader in March 1943. Following the war, he was appointed an MBE in the 1946 New Year Honours for his wartime service with the Air Ministry. Sprinks died in May 1948 at Bramshaw, Hampshire.
