= Reg Boyle =

Australian rules footballer, born 1905

Personal information
- Full name: Reginald George Boyle
- Born: 3 March 1903; Collingwood, Victoria
- Died: 1 May 1986 (aged 83); Fairfield, Victoria
- Original team: Brunswick
- Height: 165 cm (5 ft 5 in)
- Weight: 63 kg (139 lb)

Playing career^{1}
Years	Club	Games (Goals)
1925, 1932	Collingwood	3 (0)
- ^{1} Playing statistics correct to the end of 1932.

Reginald George Boyle (3 March 1903 – 1 May 1986) was an Australian rules footballer who played with Collingwood in the Victorian Football League (VFL).

== Family ==
The son of John Thomas Boyle (1862-1927), and Georgina Mary Boyle (1868-1913), née Appleton, Reginald George Boyle was born at Collingwood, Victoria on 3 March 1903.

He married Dorothy May Parker Vernon (1908-1990) in 1928.

== Football ==
=== Collingwood (VFL) ===
He made his debut for the Collingwood Football Club during the 8th Round in 1925.

=== Northcote (VFA) ===
He was cleared from Collingwood to Northcote in May 1927.

=== Brunswick (VFA) ===
In April 1928 he was cleared from "N.S.W." to Brunswick.
