= Eva Waldemarsson =

Swedish novelist

Eva Sylvia Waldemarsson (16 November 1903 – 24 May 1986) was a Swedish writer, mainly known for her historical novels. She also published a collection of poetry. She won several prizes, and a road in Rinkaby is named after her.

== Life ==
Waldemarsson was born in Rinkaby, just outside Kristianstad in Skåne in 1903. The daughter of a wholesaler in Rinkaby, she studied at a language and business institute, and then taught for several years after completing her education. She later worked as an office assistant in Kristianstad.

Waldemarsson's first published work was a poetry collection published in 1946, called Aldrig dör ljuset. In 1955, she entered her first novel Himlavargen, for a competition for the best novel from the Scania province, and won. Her novels are written in local speech, and her writing has been described as "unusual and striking, combining Scanian dialect with standard Swedish". Her writings often include environmental descriptions that show nature was important to Waldemarsson.

Waldemarsson went on to write further novels, including in 1961 Himlaland, a sequel to her first novel, and then Madonneleken in 1967, Stadsrådinnan in 1982 and Min far sköt en stork, published in 1984. All her novels are historical stories, and common themes include poverty, abuse and religion.

Waldemarsson won further prizes, including the Studieförbundet Vuxenskolans författarpris and the Kristianstads kommuns kulturpris.

Waldemarsson died in 1986, and is buried in Rinkaby. A road name there is named in her honour.

== Selected works ==
- Himlaland, novel (1961)
- Madonneleken, novel (1967)
- Stadsrådinnan, novel (1982)
- Min far sköt en stork, novel (1984)
