= Ralph Eaton =

United States Army general

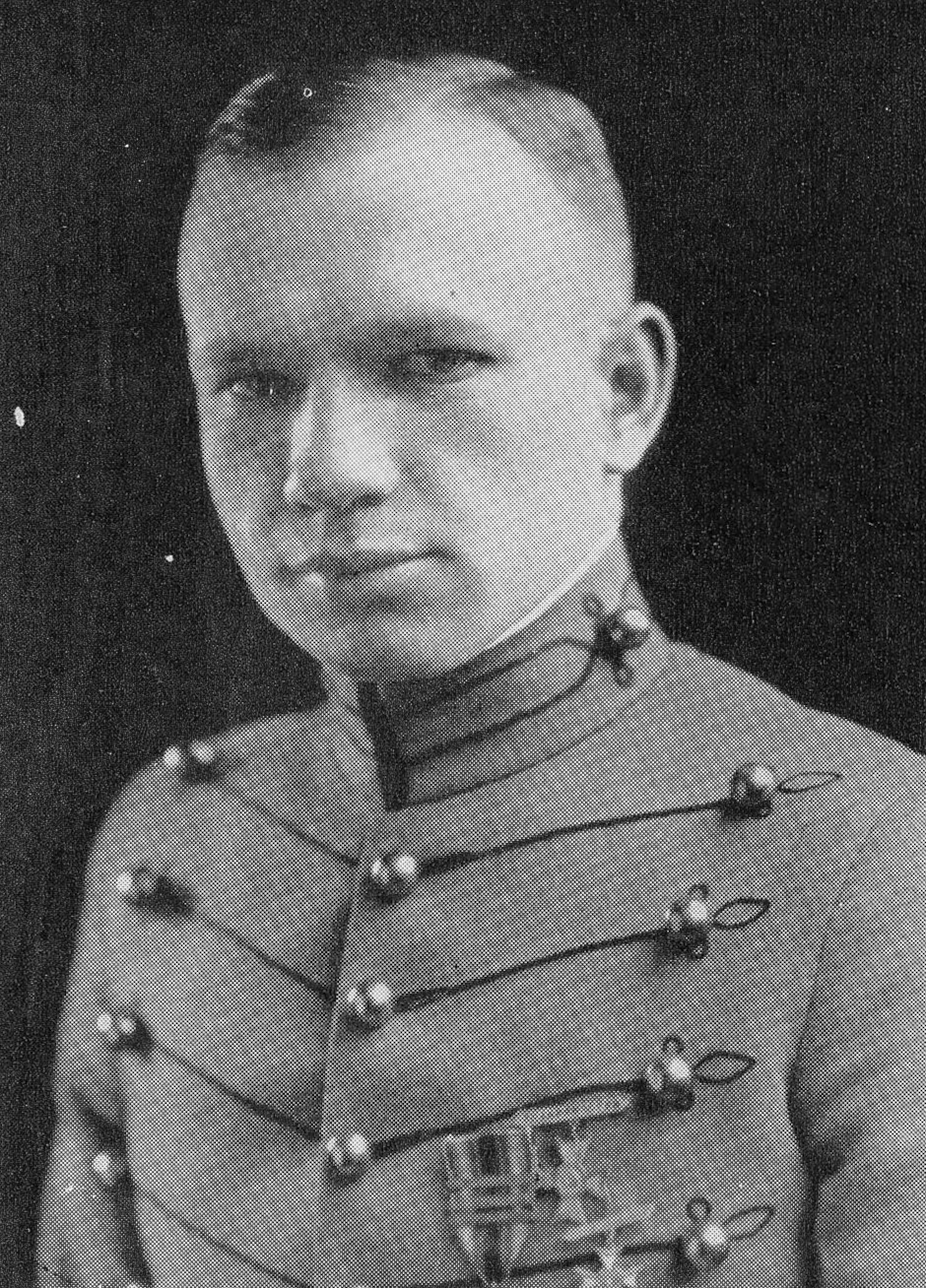
- At West Point in 1924
- Born: August 5, 1898; Bloomington, Illinois, United States
- Died: May 16, 1986 (aged 87); Asheville, North Carolina, United States
- Military career
- Allegiance: United States
- Branch: United States Army
- Service years: 1924−1954
- Rank: Brigadier General
- Nickname: "Doc"
- Service number: 0-15871
- Commands: Chief of Staff, 82nd Airborne Division; Chief of Staff, XVIII Airborne Corps
- Conflicts: World War I World War II
- Awards: Army Distinguished Service Medal; Legion of Merit (2)

Brigadier General Ralph "Doc" Parker Eaton (August 5, 1898 − May 16, 1986) was a United States Army officer who served most notably during World War II in the European Theater.

== Life ==
On August 5, 1898, Eaton was born in Bloomington, Illinois, and later went on to attend the prestigious United States Military Academy (USMA) at West Point, New York, graduating in 1924.

Perhaps his most notable role was serving as the Chief of Staff of the 82nd Airborne Division and later XVIII Airborne Corps, both of which were commanded by Major General Matthew Ridgway. His decorations included the Legion of Merit with oak leaf cluster and the Army Distinguished Service Medal. The citation for the medal reads:

The President of the United States of America, authorized by Act of Congress July 9, 1918, takes pleasure in presenting the Army Distinguished Service Medal to Colonel (Infantry), [then Brigadier General] Ralph Parker Eaton (ASN: 0-15871), United States Army, for exceptionally meritorious and distinguished services to the Government of the United States, in a duty of great responsibility from August 1944 to July 1945. The distinctive accomplishments of Colonel Eaton reflect the highest credit upon himself and the United States Army.

His other roles included a War Department Manpower Board Chairman, and Staff Secretary for the Caribbean Command. Fort Bragg, where the 82nd Airborne Division is located, has honored Eaton by naming a Hall after him, Eaton Hall.

Eaton retired from the Army in 1954 and died on May 16, 1986, at the age of 87. Eaton is interred in Lewis Memorial Park in Asheville, North Carolina.

== Career ==
Eaton's Military Milestones:

- Chief of Staff, 82nd Airborne Division [Italy]
- Chief of Staff, XVIII Airborne Corps [North West Europe]
- Chairman of 7th Section, War Department Manpower Board
- Staff Secretary, Caribbean Command
