= Stefan Sznuk =

Polish general (1896–1986)

Stefan Sznuk, OC (1896 – May 6, 1986) was a pioneering Polish aviator, as well as an Air Force major-general and was among the first to join the new Polish Air Force in 1919.

Born in Warsaw, he was educated at the Warsaw University of Technology.

He fought in World War I for Imperial Russia and later, after the Russian revolution, with the counterrevolutionary White Russians.

During the Polish Defensive War of 1939, he was staff officer and commander of the Polish Air Forces in the Army Kraków, then in the Army Lublin. He escaped to Romania, later to France and Great Britain. In London he became the Chief Inspector of the Staff of the Polish Air Forces in Great Britain.

Addressing the language problems of each nation controlling its own trainees during the 1942 Ottawa Air Training Conference (British Commonwealth Air Training Plan) of 14 United Nations countries that was designed to coordinate future air power; Poland's Group Captain Stefan Sznuk explained: Only in one instance does a Polish airman speak this language distinctly and with the proper accent—it is when he speaks to the enemy using the eloquent language of the twelve English-made machine guns of his fighter plane.

Sznuk was the last Polish Army and Air Force attaché in Canada before the Soviet-control of the nation. After the demobilization of the Polish Army he settled down in Canada. He helped over 4,500 Polish veterans emigrate to Canada after World War II and was active in the Polish community as Vice-President of the Canadian Polish Congress.

In 1970, he was made an Officer of the Order of Canada.

He died on 1986-05-06 in Ottawa, and was buried in the Notre-Dame Cemetery (Ottawa).

== Awards ==
- Virtuti Militari, Silver Medal
- Polonia Restituta, Commander
- Cross of Valour (Krzyż Walecznych), twice
- Gold Cross of Merit with Swords (Krzyż Zasługi z Mieczami)
- Order of Canada, Officer

== See also ==
=== Archives ===
There is a Stefan Sznuk fonds at Library and Archives Canada. The archival reference number is R9106.
