= Robert Zielinski =

American association football player

Profile
- Position: End

Bob "Concrete" Zielinski (December 15, 1901, in Warsaw, Poland – May 14, 1986, in Beaver County, Pennsylvania) was an American football end. He was also a professional boxer and baseball player.

== Career ==
Bob Zielinski was born in 1901 in Warsaw, Poland, and moved to the US in 1906. He lived in Sharpsburg, Pennsylvania, and played semi-professional baseball for such teams as the Butler All-Stars and Springdale Canonsburg Stars of the Pittsburgh City League. Later, he played for teams in Beaver Falls as well as the Beaver Grays and the Rochester Whippets. In football, he started for the Carrick Odds, Art Rooneys Hope-Harvey (now the Pittsburgh Steelers), Sharpsburg Tigers and Midland Merchants.

He was a boxing amateur from 1922 to 1925, and was undefeated for 35 fights. From 1925 to 1931, he was professional boxer with 60 wins and one loss.
