= Lillian Kasindorf Kavey =

American banker

- Born: July 19, 1889; New York City, U.S.
- Died: May 10, 1986 (aged 96)
- Occupations: Banker; activist
- Organizations: A.H. and L. Kavovitz Bank; Kavey and Sons Bank
- Known for: First woman granted a banking license in New York State
- Spouse: Abraham H. Kavovitz
- Children: 2 sons

Lillian Kasindorf Kavey (July 19, 1889 – May 10, 1986) was a banker and activist. She was the first woman granted a banking license in New York State.

Beginning in the 1910s, Kavey assisted European immigrants with passage to the United States by providing them with loans and assisting them at Ellis Island.

She advocated for Ethiopian Jews starting in the 1920s and assisted European Jews escaping persecution in the late 1930s

== Life ==
Kavey was born in New York City. In 1908, she married Abraham H. Kavovitz, a clothing merchant and shoe salesman. The couple lived in Port Chester, New York and had two sons

== Career ==
=== Pawn shop ===
Kavey, then known as Lillian Kavovitz, ran a pawnshop and loan company in Port Chester. Her customers were European immigrants working in nearby factories. She was able to communicate in German, Polish, Russian, Czech, and Italian.

=== Bank and travel agency ===
In the early 1900s, Kavey noticed that the Eastern European immigrants in her community were saving money under their mattresses in order to send to family members overseas to pay for their passage to New York and pivoted her pawnshop business to a travel and loan agency. She accounted for each customer's savings and interest, and when there were enough funds, she purchased steamship passage for the customer's family members to come to New York. She also became well-known at Ellis Island as she often went there to assist her clients with immigration issues.

Kavey and her husband co-founded The A.H. and L. Kavovitz Bank in 1913. This made Kavey the first woman to receive a banking license in the State of New York. The Kavovitz family changed their name to Kavey and the bank was renamed Kavey and Sons when their sons joined the business in 1940.

In 1955, Kavey and Sons merged with First Westchester National Bank which later merged with Barclay's Bank.

== Activism ==
In 1923, Kavey began her years-long focus of assisting Ethiopian Jews by purchasing farm equipment for them and advocating for them to immigrate to Israel. In the 1930s, Kavey and her husband helped 125 Jewish families escaping persecution in Egypt, Morocco, Italy, Poland, and Scandinavia.

== Community work ==
Kavey founded the Jewish Community Center of Port Chester and organized two clubs for boys during the Second World War.

== Death and legacy ==
Kavey died on May 10, 1986.

The Lillian Kavey Papers are in the collection of the Jewish Theological Seminary library in New York City.
