= Murder of Janne Aikala =

1986 child murder in Turku, Finland

- Location: Turku, Finland
- Date: 14 May 1986; 40 years ago
- Attack type: Homicide by strangulation, child murder, kidnapping
- Victims: Janne Samuel Aikala, aged 10
- Perpetrator: Jorma Patjas
- Charges: Assault; Murder; Kidnapping
- Sentence: Life imprisonment

Janne Samuel Aikala (17 October 1975 in Turku – 14 May 1986 in Turku) was a 10-year-old boy, who was killed by antiquarian keeper Jorma Patjas in May 1986. This is notable because of the Supreme Court review and the legal concept of murder and manslaughter in Finland was an issue.

== The day of the murder ==
On Wednesday, 14 May 1986, Janne Aikala had left his home for his piano lesson a little earlier than usual, in order to stop at the local antiquarian in the city centre on his way. The piano lesson was supposed to begin at 4 PM. Janne never got there. Janne's parents reported their son as missing. Because he was a small boy, the police took the report very seriously. The search was aided by the coast guard helicopters and infrared cameras, but in vain.

== Discovery of the body ==
On Saturday 17 May at 9:45 PM, a couple riding their bicycles found Janne's body 20 km away from the centre of Turku by the Turku-Tampere highway. The police investigation found that Janne had been killed by strangling, and not by accident as was originally suspected. The 41-year-old antiquarian keeper Jorma Patjas was brought in for questioning, because Janne was presumed to have last been alive in his shop. During the interrogation, Patjas confessed to having killed Janne, claiming he had killed him by accident. Patjas told the police he had consumed a lot of alcoholic beverages on the evening before the day of the murder and on the morning of the day of the murder.

== Course of events ==
Having arrived to the antiquarian, Janne had gone to the back room of the shop, where there were sex toys kept behind curtains, and according to Patjas's report, these were not suitable for the eyes of a small boy. Janne had ignored Patjas's warnings, causing Patjas to become nervous. Patjas started to assault Janne by holding him by the back of his neck and banging his head against the wall, causing him to lose consciousness. Patjas became scared, thinking he had killed Janne, and went to close the door of his shop and put a notice saying "Just a minute" at the window to keep customers away. After this, Patjas bound Janne's arms and legs, gagged him, and brought him to the back room. Having done this, Patjas went back to his apartment to drink more alcohol, leaving Janne bound in the back room of his antiquarian.

In the evening, Patjas went back to his shop to free Janne. Patjas tried to calm the panicked Janne down by offering him Coca-Cola to drink. Patjas managed to get Janne to agree not to tell anyone of what had happened. Janne soon threatened Patjas by saying "I will tell everything to the police anyway and you'll go to prison." This caused Patjas to lose his temper, and he strangled Janne to the death with a piece of rope. Immediately after having done this, Patjas hid the body in a cardboard box and took it to the back of his room. After this, he went to his apartment to sleep.

The next morning, on Thursday, Patjas opened his shop as normal. In the evening, after closing his shop, Patjas moved the cardboard box and the body to the back of his Opel and sought a quiet spot where he could abandon the body. Patjas threw the body out of the cardboard box to a ditch near the highway and drove back to his home. Patjas had left the cardboard box and the notation sheet Janne had had with him to the garbage pail by his apartment.

== Verdict ==
Jorma Patjas was sentenced in court in January 1987 for assault, kidnapping and murder to life imprisonment and to pay a sum of 21,500 Finnish markkas to Janne's family as compensation. The court decision of murder was influenced by the fact that the victim had been a defenseless child, and the victim had been assaulted and kept bound before the killing.

The Turku district court judged the case as manslaughter in July 1987, because it felt that Patjas had not acted out of premeditation when killing Janne. However, the district court also took note of the fact that the victim had been a defenseless child, and gave a severe sentence of 12 years and 1 month in prison.

In July 1988, the supreme court judged the case as murder and sentenced Patjas to lifetime in prison.
