= Eana Jeans =

Australian-New Zealand painter (1890–1986)

- Born: Eana Blyth Jeans; 16 August 1890; Brisbane, Queensland, Australia
- Died: 9 May 1986 (aged 95); Dunedin, New Zealand
- Education: Slade School of Art
- Known for: Watercolours of New Zealand bush

Eana Blyth Jeans (16 August 1890 – 9 May 1986) was a New Zealand artist best known for her watercolour paintings of native New Zealand bush.

== Early life and family ==
Born in Brisbane, Queensland, Australia, on 16 August 1890, Jeans was the daughter of artist Blandina Jeans (née Maxwell) and Thomas William Jeans. The family moved to New Zealand in 1894, settling in the Leith Valley area of Dunedin. Jeans was educated at Otago Girls' High School.

== Art education and career ==
Jeans began studying art as a student at Otago Girls', under Fanny Wimperis. She later studied at the Dunedin School of Art and the Barn Studio, Dunedin, alongside notable New Zealand artists Alfred Henry O'Keeffe and Mabel Hill. In 1934 Jeans travelled to England and studied at the Slade School of Art in London and exhibited her work at the Paris Salon, Royal Institution of Watercolourists, the Royal Society of British Artists Salon and the Chelsea Art Society in London.

Returning to New Zealand, Jeans began to specialize in painting the bush around Ross Creek and the Leith Valley where she lived. She wrote of her inspiration in the 1960s: "Having had the privilege of living in the Leith Valley where ferns, trees, brooks and streams abound, one could not do other than come under their spell. Fortunate is New Zealand to have this unique and beautiful vegetation as a reserve of strength and life from which to absorb physical and spiritual powers."

== Death ==
Jeans died in Dunedin on 9 May 1986, and her body was cremated at the Dunedin Crematorium.

== Honours and legacy ==
Jeans was an honorary life member of the Otago Art Society, and her works are held in both private and public collections in New Zealand, including the Hocken Collection, the Dunedin Public Libraries and the Dunedin Public Art Gallery in Dunedin. In 2002 an exhibition of her paintings was held as part of the Otago Festival of the Arts.
