= Nise da Silveira =

Brazilian psychiatrist

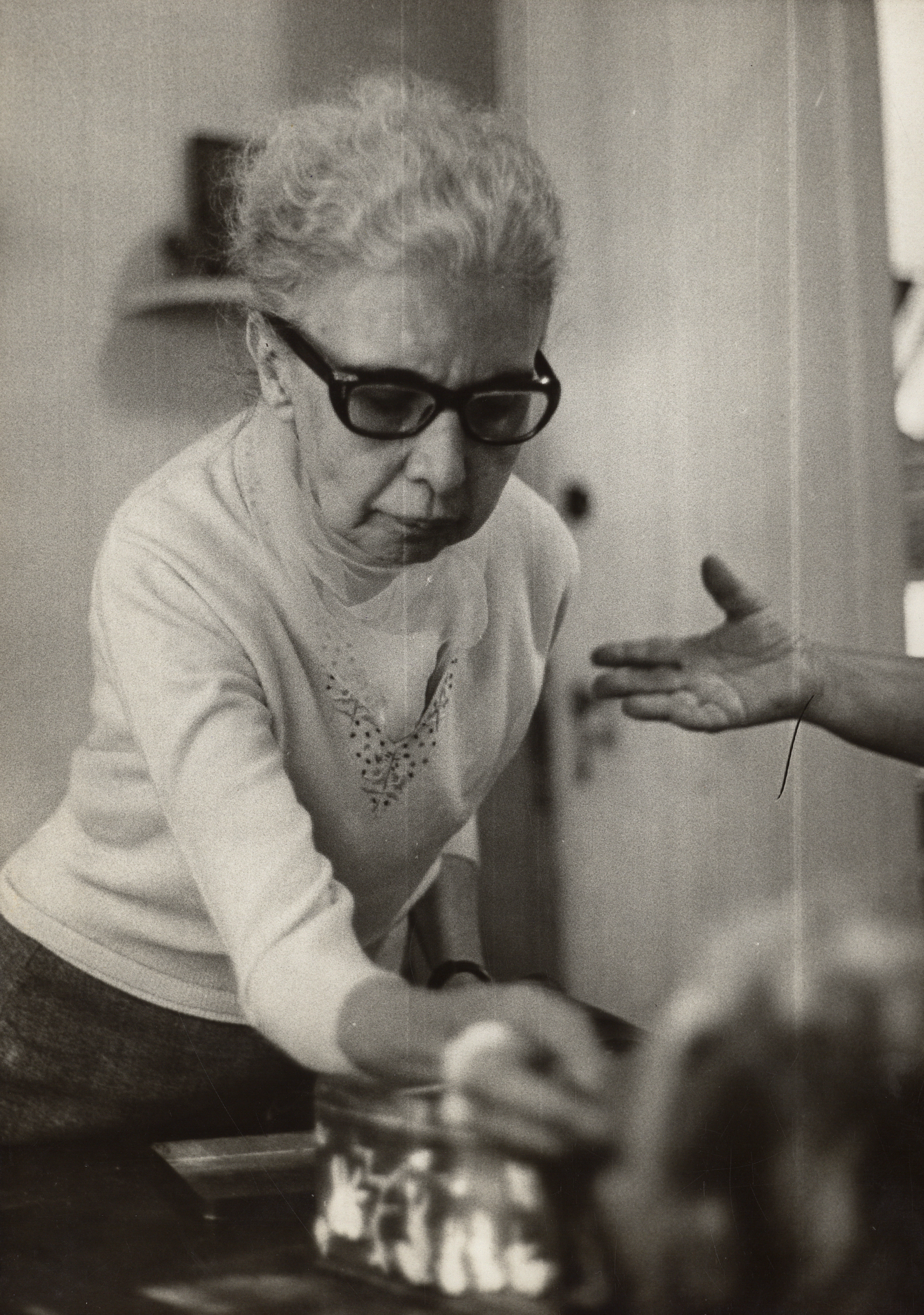
- Nise da Silveira, in 1970
- Born: February 15, 1905; Maceió, Alagoas, Brazil
- Died: October 30, 1999 (aged 94); Rio de Janeiro, Brazil
- Education: Universidade Federal da Bahia
- Spouse: Mário Magalhães da Silveira
- Scientific career
- Fields: Psychiatry

Nise da Silveira (February 15, 1905 – October 30, 1999) was a Brazilian psychiatrist and a student of Carl Jung. She devoted her life to psychiatry and challenged the conventional orthodoxies of her era, which insisted on using institutionalization and aggressive forms of medical intervention, including electroconvulsive therapy, insulin shock therapy and lobotomy to treat mental illnesses.

== Biography ==
Nise da Silveira was born in Maceió, in the northeastern state of Alagoas, Brazil, in 1905. She graduated from the Faculty of Medicine in Salvador, Bahia in 1926, the only woman among 157 men.

In 1952, she founded the Museum of Images of the Unconscious, a research center and archive located in Rio de Janeiro and aimed at studying and documenting the thousands of artworks her clients produced at the occupational therapy unit of the Pedro II (National) Center for Psychiatry. Through her work, Nise da Silveira introduced Jungian psychology to Brazil.

In 1956, Nise da Silveira developed another revolutionary project that was ahead of her time: "Casa das Palmeiras", an outpatient clinic for formerly institutionalized clients, where they could freely express their art as they transitioned back into society. She also formed the C.G. Jung Study Group, which she chaired until 1968.

Her research on occupational therapy and the use of artistic expression as a means for exploring and revealing the inner lives of mentally ill patients led to various exhibitions, films, documentaries, audiovisual productions, courses, symposia, publications, and conferences over the course of her life. She was also a pioneer in researching affective bonds between patients and animals, whom she referred to as co-therapists.

In recognition of her work, Nise da Silveira was awarded decorations, titles and prizes in different areas of knowledge. She was a founding member of the International Society for Psychopathological Expression headquartered in Paris, France. Her work and ideas inspired the creation of museums, cultural centers, and therapeutic institutions in Brazil and overseas.

On July 8, 2022, the passage of Federal Law 14.401/2022 confirmed her entry into Brazil's Livro dos Heróis e Heroínas da Pátria (Book of National Heroes).

== Death ==
Nise died on October 30, 1999, in Rio de Janeiro.

Her life and work were portrayed by Glória Pires in the 2015 biographical Brazilian film Nise: The Heart of Madness, directed by Roberto Berliner. Glória Pires also portrayed Nise da Silveira in the 2022 Brazilian telenovela Além da Ilusão.

== Tribute ==
On February 15, 2020, Google celebrated her 115th birthday with a Google Doodle.
