= Nise: The Heart of Madness =

2015 docudrama directed by Roberto Berliner

- Theatrical release poster
- Portuguese: Nise: O Coração da Loucura
- Directed by: Roberto Berliner
- Written by: Patrícia Andrade; Leonardo Rocha; Roberto Berliner; Flávia Castro; Maurício Lissovsky; Chris Alcazar; Maria Camargo
- Based on: The life of Nise da Silveira
- Produced by: Rodrigo Letler
- Starring: Glória Pires; Simone Mazzer; Julio Adrião; Cláudio Jaborandy; Fabrício Boliveira; Roney Villela; Flávio Bauraqui; Bernardo Marinho; Roberta Rodrigues; Augusto Madeira; Zé Carlos Machado
- Cinematography: Andre Horta
- Edited by: Pedro Bronz; Leonardo Domingues
- Production company: TV Zero
- Release dates: 25 October 2015 (Tokyo International Film Festival); 21 April 2016 (Brazil)
- Country: Brazil
- Language: Portuguese

Nise: The Heart of Madness (Portuguese: Nise: O Coração da Loucura) is a 2015 Brazilian docudrama film directed by Roberto Berliner. Starring Glória Pires, the film is based on the life of psychiatrist Nise da Silveira, a pioneer of occupational therapy in Brazil. Nise also features Fabrício Boliveira, Fernando Eiras, Perfeito Fortuna, Roberta Rodrigues, Augusto Madeira, Simone Mazzer, and Zé Carlos Machado.

== Plot ==
In 1944, the doctor Nise da Silveira returns to work in a psychiatric hospital in the suburbs of Rio de Janeiro and refuses to use electroshock and lobotomy in the treatment of schizophrenics. Insulated from the other doctors, she must reorganize the abandoned occupational-therapy sector, where she forms a new clinical approach of listening and observing, further alienating herself from her colleagues. Insisting that those under her care be referred to as clients, rather than patients, she encourages the freedom of expression through art, discovering her clients' talents. She opens the Casa das Palmeiras, a clinic and studio, at the hospital, and later starts a museum dedicated to her clients' artwork.

== Production ==
According to director Roberto Berliner, the idea for Nise came from Bernardo Horta, brother of the film's director of photography, André Horta. André started organizing some of da Silveira's writing, then passed the project to Berliner in 2003. In all, research for the film took 13 years.

=== Release ===
The film was released over 3 years in different parts of the world. In 2015, it was released in Japan. Throughout 2016, it was released in Sweden, France, Brazil, and the Netherlands. In 2017, it was released in the United States by Outsider Pictures and Strand Releasing. In 2018, it was released to selected (about 600) screens in mainland China from January 5 through February 4.

== Reception ==
=== Critical response ===
On the review aggregator website Rotten Tomatoes, 88% of 8 critics' reviews are positive, with an average rating of 8.3/10. Neil Genzlinger of The New York Times called it "a mesmerizing drama", Daphne Howland of The Village Voice wrote "the actors’ portrayals ... ring true", Jonathan Holland of The Hollywood Reporter called it "heartwarming but unsentimental", and J. R. Jones of the Chicago Reader wrote that it "has its powerful moments but ... turns into a black-and-white struggle between a caring, enlightened woman and a cadre of hard-hearted, benighted men."

=== Accolades ===
Year	Nominee / work	Award	Result
2015	Nise: The Heart of Madness	Tokyo International Film Festival Audience Award for Best Film	Won
2015	Glória Pires	Tokyo International Film Festival Grand Prix for Best Actress	Won
2015	Nise: The Heart of Madness	Rio Film Festival Audience Award	Won
2016	Nise: The Heart of Madness	IndieWire Critic's Poll Best Undistributed Film	Nominated
2016	Nise: The Heart of Madness	IndieWire Critic's Poll Best Overlooked Film	Nominated
