= Nicole Algan =

French sculptor

- Born: June 13, 1924 (age 100); Épinal
- Died: May 29, 1986 (aged 60); Romans-sur-Isère

Nicole Algan (June 13 1924 – May 29, 1986) was a French sculptor.

== Biography ==
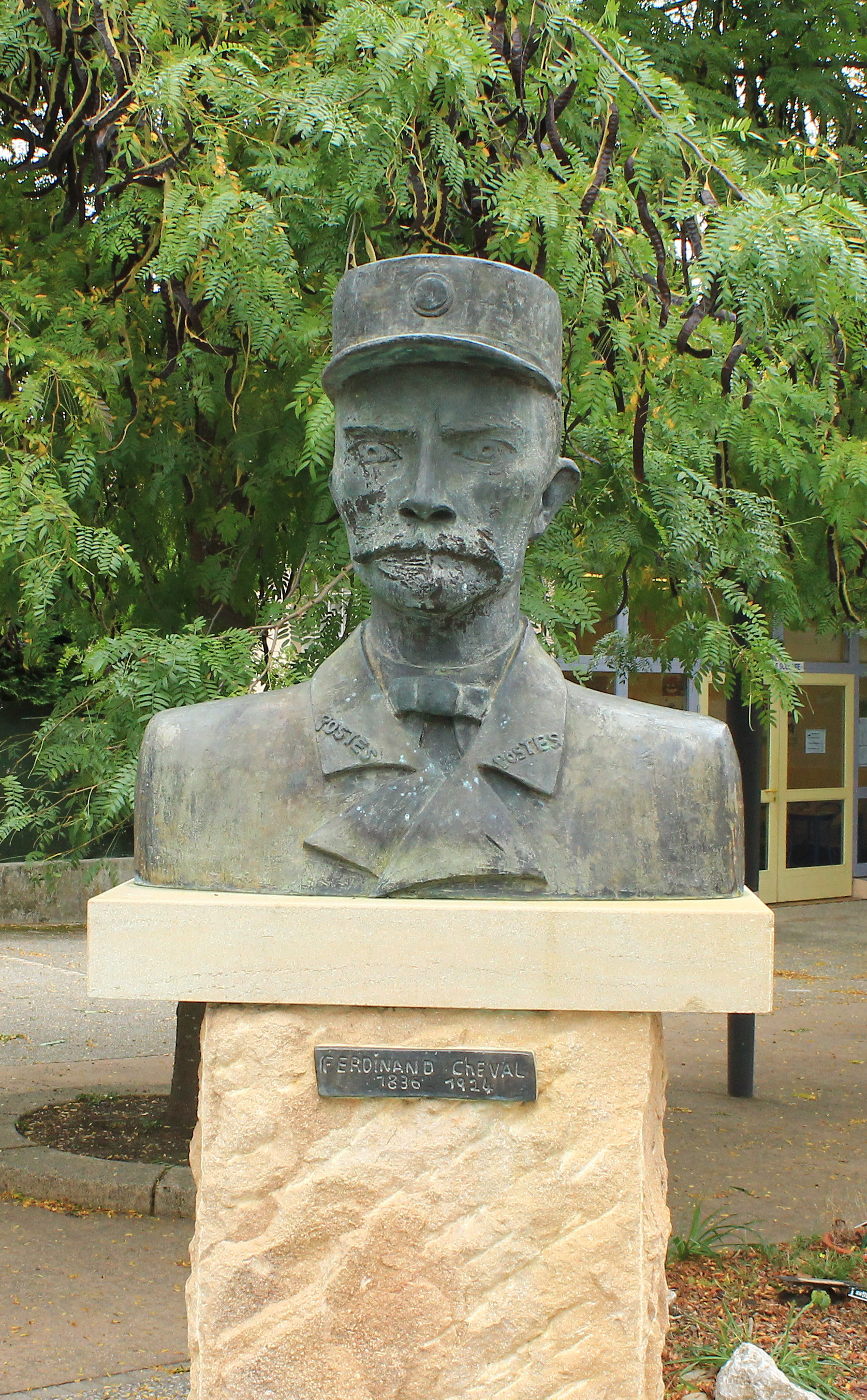
Bust of French postman Ferdinand Cheval, by Nicole Algan.

From 1942 to 1944 Algan studied the École des Beaux-arts de Paris, in the studio of Charles Despiau. She then worked with Derain from 1944 to 1954.

In 1957 Argan taught sculpture at the d'Hussein Dey youth school in Alger.

In 1968 she realized en a large monument to the dead of Saint-Marcel-lès-Valence, made of five blocks of cement three metres high by five metres wide, and a bust of Facteur Cheval at Hauterives.

== Exhibitions ==
- 1971 : L'Œil écoute, Lyon
- 1976 : L'art marginal, Nice

== Collections ==
- Musée de Grenoble
- Hauterives, bust at the Palais du Facteur Cheval
- Musée des beaux-arts de Lyon : Le petit dieu, sculpture, wood and steel, 137 x 70 x 30 cm
- Musée de Romans-sur-Isère, jardin : sculptures
