= Edward Hart (physician) =

Scottish physician

Edward Watson Hart MBE, FRCP (1911 – 23 May 1986) was a Scottish consultant physician who specialised in pediatrics.

== Education ==
Edward Hart was educated at Strathallan School in Perthshire and St John's College, Cambridge, where he was awarded first class honours in the natural sciences Tripos part 1. In 1933 he was awarded an entrance scholarship to the Middlesex Hospital in London; obtaining MRCS LRCP in 1936, graduating MB, BChir (Cantab) 1937; attaining MRCP in 1938.

== Physician ==
After qualification, Hart held house physician posts at the Middlesex Hospital and the Hospital for Sick Children, Great Ormond Street in London where he developed his interest in pediatrics.

During World War II Hart served with the Royal Army Medical Corps and was appointed lieutenant on 25 October 1939. He joined the British Army Blood Transfusion Service commanded by Lionel Whitby and served in France, Northern Ireland and India. Hart attained the rank of lieutenant colonel and had overall responsibility for the service in India. On 1 January 1945 he was appointed a Member of the Order of the British Empire (MBE) for his service.

In 1947, on his return to civilian life, Hart was appointed physician to the children's department at the Middlesex Hospital, where he worked single-handed for twenty years. He was also appointed paediatrician to Hampstead General Hospital in London. In 1949 Hart was elected a Fellow of the Royal College of Physicians (FRCP).

Hart served as honorary secretary to the British Paediatric Association from 1959 to 1968 and was made an honorary member in 1974.
