= John Santall =

English cricketer

Cricket information
- Batting: Right-handed
- Bowling: Right arm medium

Career statistics
Competition	First-class
Matches	8
Runs scored	117
Batting average	9.75
100s/50s	0/0
Top score	36*
Balls bowled	180
Wickets	2
Bowling average	62.00
5 wickets in innings	0
10 wickets in match	0
Best bowling	2/29
Catches/stumpings	2/–
- Source: CricInfo, 7 November 2022

John Frank Eden Santall (3 December 1907 – 24 May 1986) was an English first-class cricketer who played eight matches for Worcestershire, all in the space of just over a month in 1930.

Santall was never a conspicuous success with the county: in 13 innings he only thrice reached double figures (his best being the unbeaten 36 he hit against Lancashire), and with the ball he never added to the 2–29 he took in the first innings of his debut against Essex; the first of his two victims was Stan Nichols and the other Joe Hipkin.

After such a failure, Santall walked away from cricket, instead turning his attentions to ice-skating, in which sport he proved good enough to turn professional; he also worked as a skating instructor.

Santall was born in King's Heath, Birmingham; he died at the age of 78 in Bournemouth.

Two of John's relations had long careers with Warwickshire: his father Sydney took more than 1,200 wickets before the First World War, coaching the club and acting as county historian, while his brother Reg scored more than 17,000 runs for them between the wars.
