= John Dehner =

American actor (1915–1992)

- Dehner in 1977
- Born: John Dehner Forkum; November 23, 1915; New York City, New York, U.S.
- Died: February 4, 1992 (aged 76); Santa Barbara, California, U.S.
- Resting place: Carpinteria Cemetery, Carpinteria, California, U.S.
- Occupation: Actor
- Years active: 1938–1988
- Spouse(s): Roma Leonore Meyers (m. 1941; div. 1970); Evelyn Severance Elliott (m. 1973)
- Children: 2

John Dehner Forkum (November 23, 1915 – February 4, 1992) was an American actor. From the late 1930s to the late 1980s, he amassed a long list of performance credits, often in roles as sophisticated con men, shady authority figures, and other smooth-talking villains. His credits just in feature films, televised series, and in made-for-TV movies number almost 300 productions.

Dehner worked extensively as a radio actor during the latter half of that medium's "golden age," accumulating hundreds of additional credits on nationally broadcast series. His most notable starring role was as Paladin on the radio version of the television Western Have Gun – Will Travel, which aired for 106 episodes on CBS from 1958 to 1960.

He continued to work as a voice actor in film, such as narrating the film The Hallelujah Trail. Earlier in his career, Dehner also worked briefly for Walt Disney Studios, serving as an assistant animator from 1940 to March 1941 at the company's facilities in Burbank, California. He appeared in Columbo episodes "Swan Song" (1974) with Johnny Cash, and as Commodore Otis Swanson in "Last Salute to the Commodore" (1976). He appeared in a two-part episode of Mission: Impossible.

== Early life ==
Born in 1915 in New York City on Staten Island, John Dehner was the middle child of three children of Ella Susana (née Dehner) and Ralph LeRoy Forkum. (Note: John's mother, Ella Dehner, was Roy Forkum's second wife, whom he married in Missouri in 1913. See "Missouri, County Marriage, Naturalization, and Court Records, 1800–1991", Ella Dehner and R. L. Forkum, March 15, 1913, St. Charles, Missouri, Missouri State Archives, Jefferson City. Retrieved via FamilySearch archives, April 2, 2022.) Dehner's father was an accomplished artist who was widely recognized in the United States as a landscape painter, illustrator, and a specialist in painting "highly realistic" backgrounds for stage productions and later for animated features and shorts. (Note: One of many examples of R. L. Forkum's standing as an artist in the United States can be found in the February 26, 1921, issue of Motion Picture News (p. 1667), where it is reported that Metro Pictures selected him as one of three "well known artists" to judge entries in a nationwide theatrical poster competition to promote that studio's upcoming film The Four Horsemen of the Apocalypse (1921).) Dehner's mother was a gifted musician with artistic talents as well. Prior to the 1920s, Ella Forkum even collaborated with her husband on art projects and in some instances was co-credited for helping him to compose content for his drawings and paintings widely used in newspaper and magazine advertising. One example is a full-page advertisement in the March 18, 1917, issue of the Washington, D.C., newspaper Evening Star. That ad is for Djer-Kiss, a very exclusive line of French perfumes and soaps. It depicts a highly stylized, fairytale-like scene of young women bathing beneath a waterfall. The artwork itself bears the attribution to both of Dehner's parents, to "R.L. + E.D. Forkum".

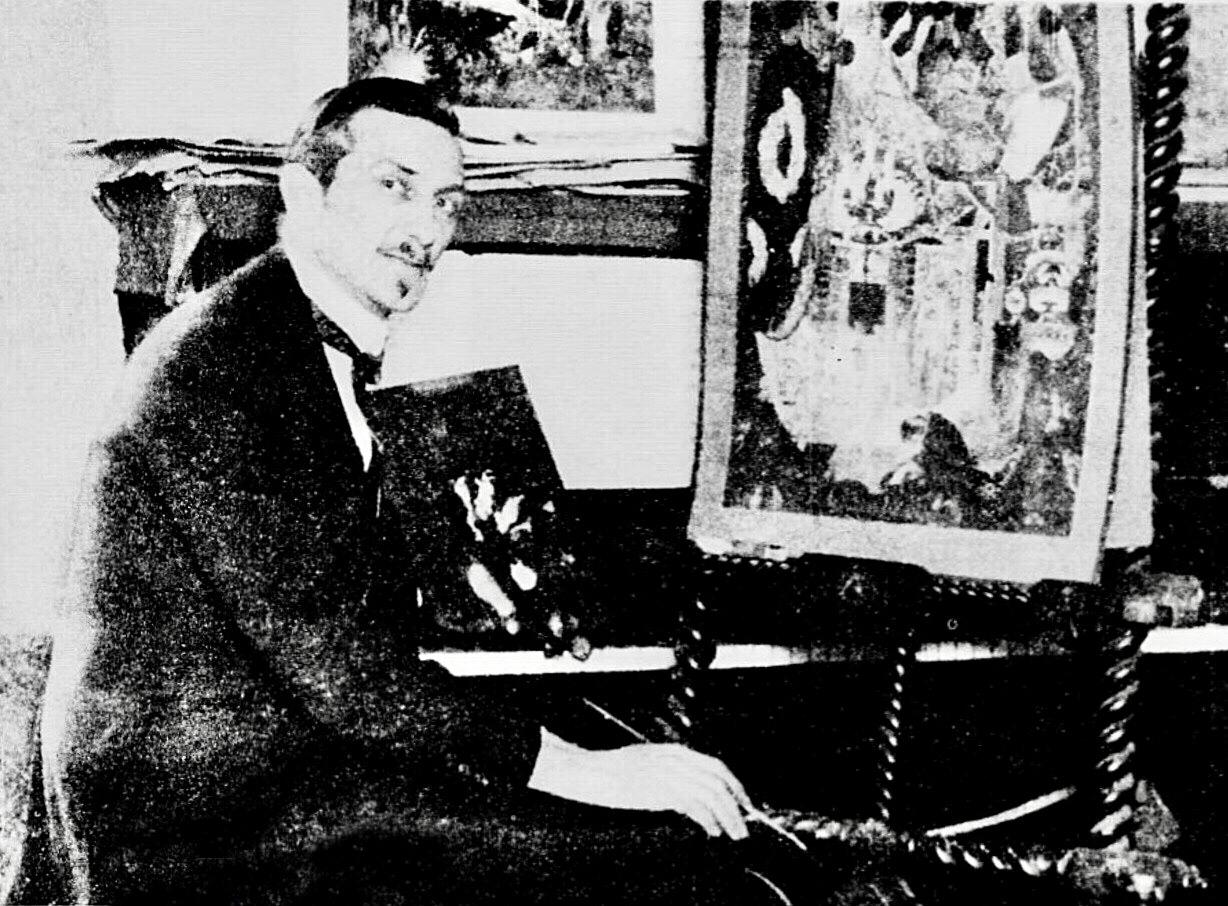
John Dehner's father, artist Ralph LeRoy Forkum, 1920

By the early 1920s, R. L. or "Roy" Forkum's growing artistic reputation earned him a commission that allowed him to take young Dehner and the rest of his family to live in Oslo, Norway while he produced illustrations for an elaborate publication celebrating the music of Norwegian composer Edvard Grieg. It was in Oslo that Dehner gained his first experiences performing publicly in musicales and school plays. Following the completion of his work on the Grieg project, Roy took Ella and the children for extended stays in Stockholm, Copenhagen, London, and finally in Paris, where for two and a half years in the French capital's suburb of Asnières-sur-Seine, Dehner and his two sisters, Amy and Alice, continued their education in public schools.

=== Schooling in France ===
Dehner's studies in France expanded his interests in art, music, and theater, as well as in the sport of fencing, in which he demonstrated sufficient skills by his early teens to qualify as a "champion" competitor. In her interview with Dehner in 1959, Marcia Minnette, a reporter for the New York trade magazine TV-Radio Mirror, quotes the actor's recollections of attending French schools three decades earlier, in particular his reactions to the rigorous study and strict discipline demanded by his teachers:

John says, "American delinquents should be sent to French schools. At the first infraction of a rule, a boy's face is banged against his desk top. Or his knuckles are soundly rapped with an oak ruler. Kids learn—at a formative age—that discipline is the first law of life; the second and third laws are application and accomplishment. We had Thursdays and Sundays off, but we left school on Wednesday and Saturday afternoons with enough school work to keep us busy for a week instead of a day."

Living and studying in Europe "at a formative age" certainly expanded Dehner's knowledge of different cultures and languages. In addition to becoming fluent in Norwegian and French, he also spoke "some" Swedish, Spanish, German, and Italian. That broad knowledge of languages would prove to be very helpful later during his acting career, when Dehner's characters were required to speak with accents or to sprinkle their English dialogue with various foreign words and phrases.

=== Return to the United States from Europe ===
While in France, Dehner's parents separated in Paris and on November 15, 1929, were granted a divorce there. Ella Forkum soon returned to the United States with 14-year-old Dehner and his sisters and resettled in the Riverview Manor section of Hastings-on-Hudson, a village located approximately 20 miles north of midtown Manhattan, where Dehner's father resided separately. (Note: Ella Forkum and her three children returned to the United States prior to the 1930 federal census in April that year, while Roy returned from France by himself in November 1930. Refer to "New York, New York Passenger and Crew Lists, 1909, 1925–1957" of Ralph LeRoy Forkum ("D", divorced) aboard S.S. Cleveland, departing Boulogne-sur-Mer, France, November 14, 1930, arriving New York, November 24, 1930; NARA. FamilySearch archives.) Between 1930 and 1932, "Dehner Forkum", his mother, and sisters were cited periodically in society columns in the New York Herald Tribune, which reported their attendance and personal performances at charity events, dances, music recitals, and plays presented in Hastings. In February 1932, as part of their high school's bicentennial celebration of George Washington's birthday, Dehner and his older sister Amy performed in Conway Cabal, a historical play written by one of their classmates. The siblings then acted the next month in an adaptation of the 1900 novel Monsieur Beaucaire, a production that won Hastings High School first prize in a regional competition for student plays.

After graduating from Hastings High School in June 1932, Dehner enrolled in the Grand Central School of Art in Manhattan, evidently with intentions to pursue a career in art like his father, who soon relocated to California to continue painting and to work in set design and later drawing backgrounds and storyboards for animation projects being made by Walter Lantz, Walt Disney, and other producers. Despite Dehner's early work in amateur stage productions and his natural talents and training as a painter and sculptor, he did not immediately embrace acting or studio art as a long-term profession.

=== University studies, 1935–1937 ===
By the fall of 1934, Dehner and his sisters left New York with their mother and relocated to the West Coast, where Amy enrolled at the University of California, Berkeley. The next year Dehner enrolled as well at Berkeley to continue his formal studies in fine arts. While at the university, he also gained more practical experience acting in campus stage productions and refining his musical talents by playing piano and composing arrangements for three local dance bands. Later school and military records indicate that he decided to leave Berkeley in the summer of 1937 after completing two years of study. (Note: "John Dehner Forkum" on his army enlistment papers confirms that the highest educational level he achieved was "2 years of college". See "California, World War II Draft Registration Cards, 1940–1945", database, John Dehner Forkum, Los Angeles, California; subset "Draft Registration Cards for California, 10/16/1940 – 03/31/1947", NARA records of the Selective Service System, 1926–1975, Record Group 147, NAID 7644723. National Archives at St. Louis, Missouri. Retrieved via FamilySearch archives.)

== Professional stage training ==
Dehner left Berkeley at the end of his second year to return to New York City to try acting in professional stage productions. There he joined a troupe associated with the Moscow Art Theatre (MAT), where he obtained intensive training in the "system" of method acting established by Soviet theatre practitioner Konstantin Stanislavski. Years later, long after Dehner had established himself as a popular actor in films and on radio and television, he credited MAT for profoundly influencing his performance style, although it was a style that over time required him to adjust substantially his acting techniques to achieve widespread success with American audiences. In particular, he recognized Mikhail Chekov, a former student of Stanislavski and the leading consultant to the New York troupe, as being professionally "'the most important man in my career.'" The Los Angeles Times in a 1971 interview with Dehner recounted how his approach to acting evolved with his MAT training:

[Dehner] admits that if he had adhered to the Moscow Art Theater [sic] philosophy of acting with unswerving determination, his career might not have fared as well as it has. "I was indoctrinated there with the means and necessity for an actor totally to subjugate himself to his character—in the European tradition of acting." Dehner says, "I learned so well that, in the end, my characterizations were much more memorable than I was."...Eventually it dawned upon Dehner that while this sort of thing apparently worked for actors in Europe, it was in America that he was trying to make his way and it was not building him a practical reputation or pulling in jobs for him here.

One of the notable stage productions in which Dehner was cast in New York is The Bridal Crown (1901) by Swedish playwright August Strindberg. Premiering on Broadway at the Vanderbilt Theatre on February 5, 1938, the play was presented under the auspices of the Experimental Theatre of Manhattan. Brooks Atkinson, then a critic for The New York Times, reviewed the stage work by "The New York Players", whom he characterized as "serious-minded" and composed of "young people with a passion for the theatre and in most cases slim pocketbooks". While citing "Dehner Forkum" among the principal actors and serving in the role of "Mats", Atkinson deemed the troupe's overall effort to be only "a respectable student performance".

Dehner continued to perform, although sporadically, in other plays in New York and with a few nearby stock companies. He did receive some financial support from his mother, but the lack of consistent, paid acting work required Dehner to find employment elsewhere in the city to support himself, including taking daytime jobs as a sales clerk in a tobacco shop and parking cars at the 1939 New York World's Fair. Frustrated by his meager lifestyle and the limited prospects of establishing a livable stage career in the city, he decided by the end of 1939 to return, as he described it, to the "life-line" of California. (Note: Dehner returned to California prior to April 1940, when he is documented in the federal census living in Burbank, California and employed at a local film studio (Walt Disney Studios).)

== Return to California ==
Upon his return to California, Dehner did not resettle in Berkeley to resume his university studies or to find an off-campus job there. His mother, who by then was living on Arch Street in Berkeley and managing a "variety store", chose to remain in the city while Dehner relocated to Southern California, to Los Angeles County, where in Hollywood there were greater opportunities for trained actors and artists to find employment in the film industry. An added advantage to moving there was that Dehner's father was already working regularly for different studios. One was Walt Disney Studios, where Roy Forkum served as a "story artist" at new facilities being constructed by Disney in Burbank, just a short distance from Hollywood. Dehner moved in with his father and new stepmother, Eileen, who were living in a house that Roy owned in Burbank at 454 South Fairview Street.

=== Walt Disney Studios ===
The 1940 federal census also documents that both father and son were employed that year at "motion picture studios"; Roy Forkum, as an "artist"; and 24-year-old Dehner, as a "new worker & student" (apprentice). Other period records, however, provide some details about Dehner's work at that time, more specifically that he, like his father, was working at Disney, where as an animator he assisted in producing drawings for Disney's 1940 animated classic Fantasia as well as for The Reluctant Dragon (1941) and for the early development of Bambi (1942).

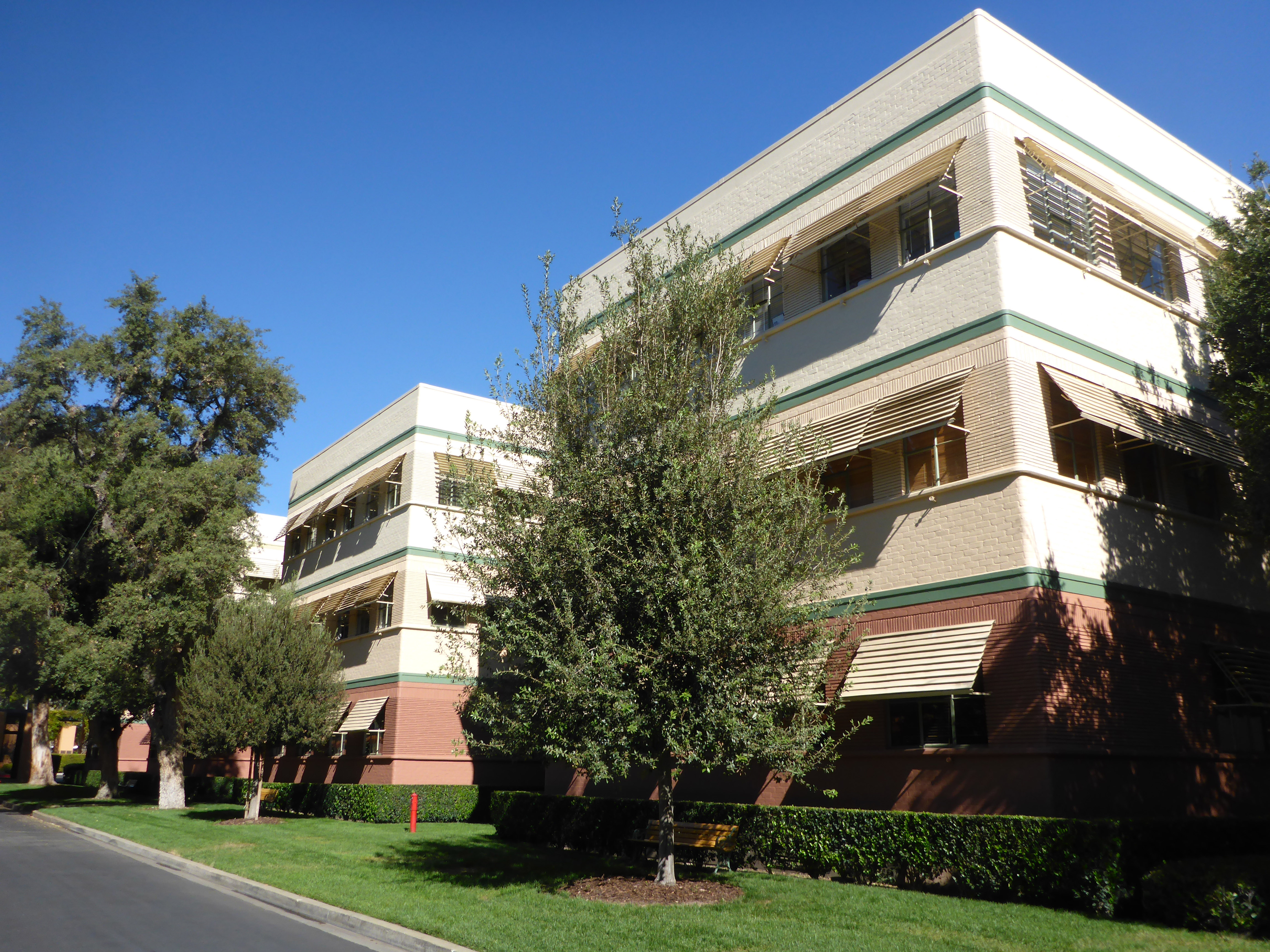
At Disney, Dehner worked here, in the studio's original Animation Building in Burbank, California, the headquarters of the animation department from 1940 to 1985.

Dehner worked for a year at Disney, and in the previously cited 1959 interview with TV-Radio Mirror he describes his job there as an in-betweener, as an assistant artist "who draws everything that goes 'in between' bits of action as sketched by the animators." Dehner states in that interview, "Sometimes, I spent days merely drawing curly lines to simulate waves, or leaf outlines, or horizons." A Disney film distributed by RKO Pictures in 1941 actually shows Dehner working at the studio. Titled The Reluctant Dragon, the first part of the film follows American actor and humorist Robert Benchley taking a behind-the-scenes tour of various production departments at Disney's facilities in Burbank. Benchley in one segment visits a storyboard room for Disney animators who are portrayed composing and drawing a future cartoon short featuring the character "Baby Weems". A very young Dehner is briefly shown among fellow staff greeting Benchley and later doing a sketch of Baby Weems while making a remark in his subsequently familiar voice. (Note: While John Dehner was actually an employed artist at Disney in 1940 and early 1941, as portrayed in the noted storyboard segment in The Reluctant Dragon, not all of the people shown in that film were employed at the studio. Actor Alan Ladd was one such performer, who was then under contract with RKO and was neither a professional artist nor a Disney employee.) Struggling actor Alan Ladd portrays one of the storyboard artists, with the most screen time, excitedly explaining the storyboards. Later that same year, Ladd would be cast in This Gun for Hire (1941) at Paramount, paving the way for his becoming one of the screen's top box office draws.

== Military service ==
After registering with the military draft in Los Angeles County in October 1940, John left Disney's animation department in early March 1941 to volunteer for the U.S. Army. In his enlistment papers, he identifies his civilian occupation as an artist and art teacher specializing in sculpture. John's initial army training prepared him to serve as a gunnery instructor, although he was soon selected for officer candidate school. (Note: Various sources, including some of Dehner's 1992 obituaries, state that John Dehner also served as a publicist in the army during his stint in the United States Army. See obituary "John Dehner; Multifacted Actor, Artist" in Los Angeles Times, February 7, 1992, p. SB A26. ProQuest.) Additional physical exams during routine screening for his candidacy revealed that Dehner had a stomach ulcer, one so severe that it prompted army physicians by the end of 1941 to honorably discharge him from military service on medical grounds.

== Radio ==
After Dehner was medically discharged from the army, he did not resume his job at Disney; instead, he embarked on a radio career, working initially as an announcer. Broadcasting and Broadcast Advertising, a widely read radio publication based in Washington, D.C., reported in March 1942 that "John Dehner Forkum...has joined the KFAC, Los Angeles, announcing staff, replacing Jack Little". By September that year, Dehner was working in Beverly Hills at KMPC, where he was promoted from serving as a "relief announcer" to a full-time position at the station. It was at that time too when he began to identify himself professionally and consistently as "John Dehner", dropping his surname. KMPC soon promoted the "announcer-writer" and occasional disc jockey yet again, elevating him to news editor. Dehner then moved to radio station KFWB, also broadcasting from Los Angeles, where he was part of a news team that won a Peabody Award for its reporting on the first United Nations conference held in San Francisco in 1945.

Dehner in the early 1940s also began performing as an actor on radio, and he continued to do so throughout the 1950s and into the 1960s. Among his earliest radio-based acting jobs was while he was employed at station KMPC, where from late 1942 to 1944 he voiced the title character and narrated the syndicated horror anthology The Hermit's Cave, which was produced by William Conrad. For the rest of the 1940s and for the remaining years of the "Golden Age of Radio", into the early 1960s, Dehner served as a guest star, a recurring character, or lead on some of the greatest nationally broadcast series of that period, all while working as well in films and on television. A few of those major radio productions are Escape, Yours Truly, Johnny Dollar, Let George Do It, California Caravan, The Count of Monte Cristo; Crime Classics; Lassie, NBC University Theater, The Adventures of Philip Marlowe, Rogers of the Gazette, Suspense, The Man Called X, The Silent Men, Smilin' Ed's Buster Brown Gang, Voyage of the Scarlet Queen, The Whistler, Family Skeleton, The Black Book, and The Adventures of Sam Spade. Dehner was also one of three actors to perform as Scotland Yard inspector Peter Black on the radio crime drama Pursuit, which aired on CBS Radio between 1949 and 1952. (Note: One example of Dehner's performance as Inspector Black in Pursuit is the episode "Pursuit in the North Sea", which initially aired on CBS Radio on July 22, 1950. Refer to "The Great Detectives of Old Time Radio" to hear the full episode.) Between 1950 and 1951, he co-starred as Elmer in the radio comedy The Truitts. In 1952, he played the title character on The Judge, a single episode audition (equivalent to a television pilot), but it never went to series.

Articulate and possessing a rich baritone voice, Dehner during the 1950s was recognized by Radio Life Magazine for having the entertainment industry's "best radio voice", an asset that continued to provide him many more opportunities in broadcasting. Much of his work in that period was performing as an array of characters in radio Westerns such as The Cisco Kid, Wild Bill Hickok, Gunsmoke, and Fort Laramie. He also starred in two Western series on CBS Radio in 1958. In February that year, he began voicing the title character for Frontier Gentleman, a weekly series that followed the "action-filled" exploits of J. B. Kendall, a British Army veteran who as a newspaper reporter traveled throughout the Old West gathering stories for The London Times. Although that series lasted only nine months, Dehner's representation of Kendall in 42 episodes was well received by period reviewers, one of whom described the actor's portrayal of the main character as "elegant and icily effective". Only a week after the final broadcast of Frontier Gentleman in November 1958, Dehner premiered as the gunfighter-private detective Paladin on the radio version of Have Gun Will Travel. That series, which totaled 106 episodes, continued for two full years, ending in November 1960.

== Films ==
Dehner during his 50-year entertainment career performed in over 125 feature films and shorts. He made his first "big screen" appearances in the early 1940s after he was discharged from the army, performing in uncredited bit parts while still working predominantly in radio. For several years he worked picture-to-picture as a modern journeyman, visiting casting offices, auditioning, and building screen time and experience at Republic, RKO, Warner Bros., Paramount, Metro-Goldwyn-Mayer, and Twentieth Century-Fox. Among Dehner's initial film appearances are his uncredited role in a Republic Western in which he broke his right hand in a fight scene and as "Sheik Ameer" in the 1943 Sol Lesser production Tarzan's Desert Mystery.

Other roles in which he was cast include a military officer, radio announcer, miner, medical intern, and state trooper in films such as Thirty Seconds Over Tokyo (1944), Lake Placid Serenade (1944), The Corn Is Green (1945), Twice Blessed (1945), Captain Eddie (1945), Christmas in Connecticut (1945), State Fair (1945), She Went to the Races (1945), and Club Havana (1945). Although Dehner's early performances in these motion pictures were not actually credited on screen, his name began to appear in cast credits published in leading film-industry publications. For instance, his name and roles in both Captain Eddie and State Fair are cited in the nation's top movie-fan magazine in 1945, Photoplay, as well as in The Film Daily and the Showmen's Trade Review.

For the rest of the 1940s, Dehner continued to perform in assorted film genres: crime dramas, mysteries, seafaring and jungle adventures, espionage stories, and a growing number of Westerns. Steadily during his early years of film acting, Dehner established a reputation among casting directors and theater audience as a reliable performer who could portray a myriad of characters, although most often in villainous roles as crooked gamblers, evil bankers, distinguished foreign spies, grifters, edgy gunfighters, and other "heavies". In fact, a news item titled "John Dehner Turns to Right of Law" and published in Ohio in the July 21, 1950, issue of the Toledo Union Journal underscores how entrenched that reputation was. The newspaper describes for movie fans the actor's role in an upcoming picture:

HOLLYWOOD—For one of the few times in his villainous screen career, John Dehner will be seen on the right side of the law as an undercover agent in Columbia's "Counterspy Meets Scotland Yard." Dehner, who recently completed important roles in "Last of the Buccaneers," and "Al Jennings of Oklahoma," joins a cast which includes Howard St. John, Ron Randell and Amanda Blake.

=== 1950s–1965 ===
The 1950s were Dehner's busiest years performing in theatrical films. He was cast in at least 63 features released during that decade and fully half of those pictures are Westerns, several of which offered Dehner the most substantial parts of his screen career. After getting good notices for his supporting role in the 1956 RKO production Tension at Table Rock, Dehner was chosen by Howard W. Koch and Aubrey Schenck of Bel-Air Productions to be the lead in Revolt at Fort Laramie (1957), playing cavalry officer Major Seth Bradner. The actor, though a very familiar face to motion picture audiences, was still not considered by most producers to have significant drawing power at the box office. The film-industry publication Motion Picture Exhibitor, which had a large readership of theater owners in 1957, commends the overall quality of Revolt at Fort Laramie in its March 20 review but alludes to the film's lack of star power. The journal describes the 73-minute Western as a "Good programmer" with "competent" performances by Dehner and other cast and a "sufficient" number of action scenes that "holds interest despite lack of name values." The next year, in 1958, Dehner received second billing in The Left-handed Gun, playing opposite Paul Newman who stars as the title character, the outlaw Billy the Kid. Dehner in that film portrays Sheriff Pat Garrett, who tracks down and kills Billy.

Moving into the 1960s, Dehner began that decade co-starring in The Canadians (1961), yet another Western, although it was not a United States production. It was instead an Anglo-Canadian project filmed entirely in Canada by a predominantly English and Canadian cast and crew. Dehner, once again playing the villain as an "Indian-hating rancher", shared top billing with fellow American actor Robert Ryan and British actor Torin Thatcher. For Dehner's next three motion pictures, however, he accepted three supporting roles outside the realm of Westerns and set in contemporary times: the drama The Chapman Report (1962); another contemporary drama, Youngblood Hawke (1962); and a comedy starring Bob Hope and Lucille Ball, Critic's Choice (1963).

In 1964, Dehner co-starred with Wally Cox in Invitation to Ohio, a film sponsored by the Ohio Bell Telephone Company. Cox portrays Doc Hutton, the owner of a small popcorn and peanut wagon, who is seeking to relocate his tiny business to a more profitable area. After reading an advertisement in The Wall Street Journal about the economic advantages of working in Ohio, Hutton calls the state's Director of Development, a role played by Dehner. Comedy ensues when the Director, mistaking the popcorn-peanut vendor as the president of a large industrial corporation, invites Hutton to tour the state with him.

=== Final theatrical films, 1966–1985 ===
By 1966, Dehner's success in films had been almost exclusively in supporting roles, so in an effort to obtain more leading parts, he decided to establish that year his own production company. Motion Picture Exhibitor reports in its July 6, 1966, issue that Dehner had recently formed "J. D. Productions", an enterprise with "one of its primary functions" being to purchase story ideas and scripts to develop into projects in which Dehner "would star in the film versions". To what extent Dehner's company developed projects or directed him to parts in future screen productions is unknown, but Dehner continued to act in films for the next 20 years, although not in roles for which he received top billing. His first feature after the establishment of J. D. Productions is the crime drama Stiletto (1969) starring Alex Cord, Britt Ekland, and Patrick O'Neal. Dehner once again plays in a supporting role but on the "right side" of the law, portraying a district attorney.

After appearing in three consecutive Westerns in 1970 and 1971, including Support Your Local Gunfighter with James Garner, Dehner completed his film career performing almost exclusively in productions outside the genre of "cowboy pictures". He was cast in historic dramas like The Lincoln Conspiracy (1977) and the astronaut epic The Right Stuff (1983), in science-fiction features such as Slaughterhouse-Five (1972) and The Boys from Brazil (1978); in comedies like Fun with Dick and Jane (1977) with Jane Fonda and Airplane II: The Sequel (1982); and in neo-noir thrillers such as The Killer Inside Me (1976) and Jagged Edge (1985). Dehner was third-billed under Denver Pyle and Ken Berry (Pyle played the titular character Galen Clark) in the 1976 production Guardian of the Wilderness, in which Dehner appears as the early American naturalist and "Father of the National Park" John Muir.

== Television ==
As Dehner's radio and film careers continued to progress in the 1950s, he also began working increasingly in the rapidly expanding medium of television, and over more than 35 years he performed on a wide range of Western series, situation comedies, science-fiction anthologies, crime dramas, made-for-TV movies, and in guest appearances on variety shows. Among his early performances on televised series are in two 1952 episodes–"The Parachute Story" and "The Dead General Story"–on NBC's Dangerous Assignment starring Brian Donlevy. While Dehner in those cited episodes and in many other series was identified foremost as a dramatic actor, he was cast too on assorted sitcoms throughout his career. Some of the televised series on which he performed in the 1950s and 1960s are The Soldiers, The Real McCoys, The Andy Griffith Show, The Beverly Hillbillies, F Troop, The Untouchables, Mission: Impossible, The Flying Nun, Get Smart, and Hogan's Heroes.

Dehner is featured as well on the classic science-fiction series The Twilight Zone, appearing in three episodes between 1959 and 1964: as Captain Allenby, a spaceship pilot, in "The Lonely"; as Alan Richards in "The Jungle", a story about a construction-company owner who is terrorized by African spiritual forces; and as a con man, who in "Mr. Garrity and the Graves" arrives in the small 1890 town of "Happiness", Arizona claiming he can raise the dead. Dehner's performance in the latter episode showcases one example of his talent for projecting subtle humor. Marc Scott Zicree in the 1989 edition of his book The Twilight Zone Companion highlights that quality in Dehner's portrayal of Garrity, describing the actor as "marvelously dry as a con man".

=== Western series ===
For most of Dehner's television career, the genre he performed most often in was the Western, especially during the 1950s and 1960s. He was cast, at times repeatedly, as a guest star or major supporting character in over 40 Western series. These include The Adventures of Kit Carson, Cheyenne with Clint Walker, Zorro, Maverick (four appearances in varied roles, one of which was the episode "Shady Deal at Sunny Acres" with both James Garner and Jack Kelly), Dick Powell's Zane Grey Theatre, Tales of Wells Fargo with Dale Robertson, Bat Masterson, Rawhide, Bonanza, Law of the Plainsman, The Rebel with Nick Adams, Cimarron City, The Alaskans with Roger Moore, The Restless Gun, The Rifleman, Stagecoach West, The Texan, Black Saddle, Wagon Train, Wanted: Dead or Alive, Wichita Town, Stoney Burke, A Man Called Shenandoah, Branded with Chuck Connors, The Virginian, The Wild Wild West, The Big Valley with Barbara Stanwyck, and The High Chaparral with Cameron Mitchell.

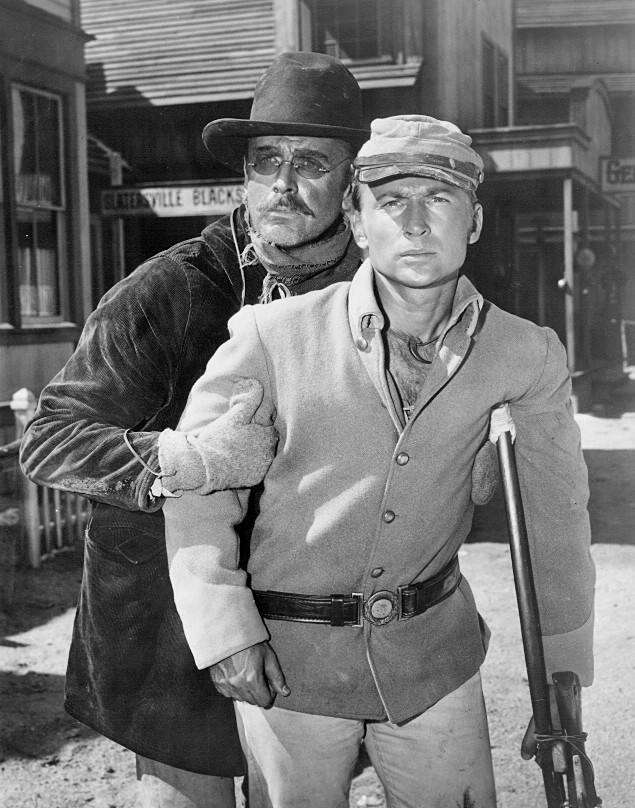
Dehner behind Nick Adams in the 1961 episode "Jerkwater" on the Western series The Rebel

In the September 1960 issue of the TV-Radio Mirror, staff reporter Sam Campbell commented about Dehner's frequent appearances on television in a feature article and highlights the actor's ongoing reputation as one of the American television industry's top villains in weekly Westerns. Campbell also observes that being a frequently working supporting actor like Dehner has distinct advantages over the higher pressures and role requirements of stardom:

Barely a television day goes by without some lawman (quite possibly Pat McVey, a favorite sheriff) firing lead into such worthy villains as John Dehner, Jack Elam, [and] Anthony Caruso. Their faces are most familiar, but their names are almost lost in the credits. As a matter of fact, if their names became too well known, it might be injurious to their careers. The more they can bite the dust without becoming stars, the bigger their swimming pools grow...to the top character actor who is well-established on TV, typecasting is nothing less than a gravy train. You'll hear few complaints from the players we've pictured [in this article], many of whom have been big stars in other fields. Dehner is Paladin in radio's version of Have Gun, Will Travel.

Dehner in the 1950s and 1960s was cast too in numerous roles on both the radio and television versions of the long-running Western Gunsmoke. His performances as different characters in 12 televised episodes of that series demonstrate the range of his acting talents. He portrays an unlikable drifter in the televised series' second episode, "Hot Spell" (1955); an old gold miner named Nip Cullers, who is desperate to find a wife in "Tap Day for Kitty" (1956); the long-lost, devious father of Dodge City bar owner Kitty Russell in "Daddy-O" (1957); a psychotic gunman in the episode "Crack Up" (1957); a pathetic town drunk—yet a desperately protective father—in "Bottleman" (1958); a sadistic bandit in "The Badge" (1960); a lonely widower who in "The Squaw" (1961) marries a much-younger Arapaho woman and must cope with the resulting hostility of his only son; as a nomadic and lazy would-be farmer traveling with two scheming older children in "Root Down" (1962); a brain-damaged freight operator who undergoes a drastic personality change in "Ash" (1963); a dejected and childless homesteader who finds his peace in taking a bullet that saves Marshal Dillon's life in "Caleb" (1964); a timid resident of Dodge City who gains fleeting celebrity after killing an outlaw in "The Pariah" (1965); and as Sam Wall, a ruthlessly exploitive businessman in "Dead Man's Law" (1968).

=== Later televised performances, 1970–1988 ===
By 1970, the number of Western series on American television had substantially declined, a development that offered Dehner opportunities during the final years of his career to play once again more parts outside that genre. Those opportunities, however, coincided with his expressed dissatisfaction with the state of acting in the entertainment industry. In a one-on-one interview with Dehner, which was published in The Atlanta Constitution and other newspapers in October 1971, syndicated Hollywood columnist Dick Kleiner quoted the actor's views about his profession at that time:

"I'm getting a bit disenchanted with acting," says Dehner. "I used to think of it as a noble profession, but lately I have begun to change my mind...Because of the low budgets and the tight time considerations, the producers these days are interested only in getting the job done fast. They're not interested in artistry at all. It isn't what it used to be."
More and more [reports Kleiner], Dehner is coming to the conclusion that he'd like to write more and act less..."I'm 55," Dehner says, "and I'm beginning to take stock of where I've been and where I'm going."

Despite Dehner's changing attitudes regarding the state of his profession, he continued to perform regularly on television series and in made-for-TV movies until just a few years before his death. He played the part of veteran magazine editor Cy Bennett for two seasons (1971–1973) on the weekly sitcom The Doris Day Show and was cast in multiple episodes as a recurring character on other weekly series such as in the second season of the black comedy The New Temperatures Rising Show (1973), as Barrett Fears in Big Hawaii (1977), in the soap operas Bare Essence (1983) and The Colbys (1986–1987), and a return to a Western role as the "humorless, businesslike" Marshal Edge Troy in the series Young Maverick (1979–1980). Some of his other roles in that closing period of his career are in docudramas, miniseries, and in movies produced specifically for television. Dehner portrays, for example, former U.S. Secretary of State Dean Acheson in the 1974 ABC presentation The Missiles of October; and for his final role on television, which originally aired on November 23, 1988, he appears as Admiral Ernest King in part seven of the 12-part World War II dramatic miniseries War and Remembrance.

== Returns to stage ==
Dehner's decades of overlapping commitments to perform on radio, films, and television left him relatively little time during his career to participate regularly in stage productions as well. He did not, though, leave theater work entirely behind. Over the years, particularly during the 1960s, Dehner enjoyed returning to the stage to direct and to act in roles ranging from leads to minor parts in a variety of plays, usually productions offered at small venues by local theater groups located near Dehner's home in California. In its "On Stage" section in August 1961, the Los Angeles Times announced a presentation at the Santa Monica Women's Club of George Bernard Shaw's play Major Barbara, starring Jocelyn Brando and supported by John Dehner, Lee Marvin, Marvin Miller, Robert Middleton, and other experienced performers. The next year, in September, Dehner directed fellow prominent actors in performances of John Mortimer's comedy I Spy at the "Rustic Canyon Playground clubhouse". Two months later, in November 1962 at the El Capitan Theatre in Hollywood, Dehner joined Lee Marvin again, along with James Whitmore, Louis Nye, and Paul Fix, to play pirates in a production of Peter Pan with Peggy Webber in the title role. (Note: In the cited 1962 news item in the Los Angeles Times, the article misspells actor Peggy Webber's surname, spelling it "Weber".)

== Personal life and death ==
Dehner married twice, the first time in 1941 to Roma Leonore Meyers, a California native who was five years older than John. The couple had two daughters, Kirsten and Sheila, and remained together for nearly 30 years, until divorcing in October 1970. Three years later, in Los Angeles, Dehner wed Evelyn (née Severance) Elliott, also a native of California. They remained together until his death.

In 1992, a little over three years after performing in the televised miniseries War and Remembrance, Dehner died at age 76 in Santa Barbara, California due to complications from emphysema and diabetes. His body was cremated and the ashes interred at the city cemetery in Carpinteria, a small seaside community situated a short distance east of Santa Barbara.

== Filmography ==
=== 1940s ===
- Fantasia (1940, animator)
- The Reluctant Dragon (1941) playing himself as Tall Baby Weems Storyboard Artist with Mustache (uncredited)
- Bambi (1942, animator)
- Bellboy Donald (1942) as Hotel Manager (voice, uncredited)
- Tarzan's Desert Mystery (1943) as Prince Ameer (uncredited)
- Thirty Seconds Over Tokyo (1944) as Lieutenant Commander (uncredited)
- Hollywood Canteen (1944) as Norwegian Sailor (uncredited)
- Lake Placid Serenade (1944) as Radio Announcer (uncredited)
- The Corn Is Green (1945) as Miner with Pipe in Bar (uncredited)
- Twice Blessed (1945) as Contest Announcer (uncredited)
- Captain Eddie (1945) as Ambulance Attendant (uncredited)
- Christmas in Connecticut (1945) as State Trooper No. 2 (uncredited)
- State Fair (1945) as Hog Contest Announcer (uncredited)
- She Went to the Races (1945) as Winner's Announcer (uncredited)
- Club Havana (1945) as Jeffreys (uncredited)
- The Undercover Woman (1946) as Walter Hughes
- The Catman of Paris (1946) as Georges
- Her Kind of Man (1946) as Guest (uncredited)
- Rendezvous 24 (1946) as Harris (uncredited)
- O.S.S. (1946) as German Radar Captain (uncredited)
- The Searching Wind (1946) as American Reporter in Paris (uncredited)
- The Last Crooked Mile (1946) as Jarvis – Gang Leader
- Big Town (1946) as Willard Erskine (uncredited)
- Out California Way (1946) as Rod Mason
- It's a Joke, Son! (1947) as Reporter (uncredited)
- Vigilantes of Boomtown (1947) as Bob Fitzsimmons
- Golden Earrings (1947) as SS Officer with Hoff (uncredited)
- Blonde Savage (1947) as Joe Comstock
- Bury Me Dead (1947) as Reporter (uncredited)
- Dream Girl (1948) as Radio Announcer (uncredited)
- He Walked by Night (1948) as Assistant Bureau Chief (uncredited)
- Let's Live a Little (1948) as Dempster (uncredited)
- State Department: File 649 (1949) as Third Oral Examiner (uncredited)
- I Cheated the Law (1949) as Newspaperman (uncredited)
- Tulsa (1949) as Oilman (uncredited)
- Riders of the Pony Express (1949) as John Dakin
- Kazan (1949) as Henri Le Clerc
- The Secret of St. Ives (1949) as Couguelat
- Barbary Pirate (1949) as Murad Reis
- Prejudice (1949) as Office Bigot (uncredited)
- Bandits of El Dorado (1949) as Charles Bruton
- Feudin' Rhythm (1949) as Serious Actor (uncredited)
- Mary Ryan, Detective (1949) as Belden (uncredited)
- Horsemen of the Sierras (1949) as Duke Webster
- Bodyhold (1949) as Sir Raphael Brokenridge

=== 1950s ===
- Backfire (1950) as Blake – Plainclothes Cop (uncredited)
- Dynamite Pass (1950) as Anson Thurber
- Captive Girl (1950) as Hakim
- Texas Dynamo (1950) as Stanton
- Destination Murder (1950) as Frank Niles
- Rogues of Sherwood Forest (1950) as Sir Baldric (uncredited)
- David Harding, Counterspy (1950) as Frank Reynolds (uncredited)
- Three Secrets (1950) as Gordon Crossley (uncredited)
- Last of the Buccaneers (1950) as Sgt. Belchue
- Counterspy Meets Scotland Yard (1950) as Agent Bob Reynolds
- The Flying Missile (1950) as Lieutenant Commander (uncredited)
- Fort Savage Raiders (1951) as Capt. Michael Craydon
- When the Redskins Rode (1951) as John Delmont
- Lorna Doone (1951) as Baron de Wichehalse
- The Texas Rangers (1951) as John Wesley 'Wes' Hardin
- China Corsair (1951) as Pedro
- Corky of Gasoline Alley (1951) as Jefferson Jay – Confidence Man (uncredited)
- Hot Lead (1951) as Turk Thorne aka John H. Smith
- Ten Tall Men (1951) as Jardine
- Harem Girl (1952) as Khalil
- The Green Glove (1952) as Narrator (uncredited)
- Aladdin and His Lamp (1952) as Prince Bokra
- Scaramouche (1952) as Doutreval
- Desert Passage (1952) as Bronson
- California Conquest (1952) as Fredo Brios
- Cripple Creek (1952) as Emil Cabeau
- Lady in the Iron Mask (1952) as Count de Fourrier
- Junction City (1952) as Emmett Sanderson
- Plymouth Adventure (1952) as Gilbert Winslow
- Man on a Tightrope (1953) as The Chief
- Powder River (1953) as Harvey Logan
- Fort Algiers (1953) as Major Colle
- Gun Belt (1953) as Matt Ringo
- Vicki (1953) as Police Capt. J. 'Chief' Donald (uncredited)
- The Steel Lady (1953) as Sid Barlowe
- Southwest Passage (1954) as Matt Carroll
- The Bowery Boys Meet the Monsters (1954) as Dr. Derek Gravesend
- Apache (1954) as Weddle
- The Prodigal (1955) as Joram
- The Man from Bitter Ridge (1955) as Ranse Jackman
- Tall Man Riding (1955) as Ames Luddington
- The Scarlet Coat (1955) as Nathanael Greene
- The King's Thief (1955) as Capt Herrick
- Duel on the Mississippi (1955) as Jules Tulane
- Top Gun (1955) as Tom Quentin
- Carousel (1956) as Mr. Bascombe
- Please Murder Me (1956) as Ray Willis
- Terror at Midnight (1956) as Lew Hanlon
- A Day of Fury (1956) as Preacher Jason
- The Fastest Gun Alive (1956) as Taylor Swope
- Tension at Table Rock (1956) as Hampton
- Gunsmoke (1957 episode "Daddy-O") as Wayne Russell, Kitty's father.
- Revolt at Fort Laramie (1957) as Maj. Seth Bradner
- The Iron Sheriff (1957) as Roger Pollack
- Trooper Hook (1957) as Fred Sutliff
- The Girl in Black Stockings (1957) as Sheriff Jess Holmes
- The Restless Gun (1958) as Mr. Temple in Episode "The Coward"
- The Restless Gun (1958) as Sheriff Partridge in Episode "Quiet City"
- The Left Handed Gun (1958) as Pat Garrett
- Apache Territory (1958) as Grant Kimbrough
- Man of the West (1958) as Claude
- Timbuktu (1958) as Emir Bhaki aka The Lion of the Desert
- Wanted Dead or Alive (1959) as Sheriff Hayes
- Cast a Long Shadow (1959) as Chip Donohue
- Wagon Train (1959) as Cleve Colter
- The Restless Gun (1959) in final series episode "The Hill of Death"
- Bat Masterson (1959) as a vengeful Sheriff
- The Twilight Zone "The Lonely" episode (1959) as Captain Allenby
- "The Rifleman" (1959) S2 E12 "The Babysitter" as Wood Bartell

=== 1960s ===
- Vice Raid (1960) as Narrator (uncredited)
- The Tom Ewell Show (1961) as Newton Pickering
- Maverick (1961) as Luther Cannonbaugh
- The Untouchables (1961) as Huey Barker
- The Canadians (1961) as Frank Boone
- Gunsmoke (1961 episode "The Squaw") as Hardy Tate
- The Twilight Zone (1961 episode "The Jungle") as Alan Richards
- Rawhide (1961) – Jubal Wade in S3:E17, "Incident of the New Start"
- The Chapman Report (1962) as Geoffrey Harnish
- The Virginian (1963 episode "To Make This Place Remember") as Frank Sturgis
- The Virginian (1963 episode "Echo of Another Day") as Bleeck
- Critic's Choice (1963) as S.P. Champlain
- The Andy Griffith Show (1963 episode "Aunt Bee's Medicine Man") as Colonel Harvey
- The Twilight Zone (1964 episode "Mr. Garrity and the Graves") as Jared Garrity
- Bonanza (1964) S5 E18 "The Gentleman from New Orleans" as Jean Lafitte
- Youngblood Hawke (1964) as Scotty Hawke
- The Rogues (1964) as Taylor C. Grant
- Combat! (1964) as Gen. Armand Bouchard
- The Baileys of Balboa (1964–1965) as Commodore Cecil Wyntoon
- The Wild Wild West (1965) as John Maxwell Avery in "Night of the Casual Killer" and (1966) as Colonel "Iron Man" Torres in "The Night of the Steel Assassin"
- The Big Valley (1965) as Daddy Cade in "The Invaders"
- The Hallelujah Trail (1965) as Narrator (uncredited)
- Hogan's Heroes (1966 two part episode "A Tiger Hunt in Paris") as Colonel Backscheider
- Ironside (1968 episode "Sergeant Mike") as The Colonel
- Mission: Impossible (1968 two part episode "The Contender") as Dan Whelan
- The Helicopter Spies (1968) as Dr. Parviz Kharmusi
- The Beverly Hillbillies (1968) as Dr. Rex Goodbody
- Stiletto (1969) as District Attorney Frank Simpson
- The High Chaparral (1969) as Gar Burnett

=== 1970s ===
- Quarantined (1970) as Dr. John Bedford
- Tiger by the Tail (1970) as Sheriff Chancey Jones
- The Cheyenne Social Club (1970) as Clay Carroll (uncredited)
- Dirty Dingus Magee (1970) as Brig. Gen. George
- Support Your Local Gunfighter (1971) as Colonel Ames
- Slaughterhouse-Five (1972) as Prof. Rumfoord
- The Doris Day Show (1971–73) (seasons 4–5) as Cy Bennett
- The Day of the Dolphin (1973) as Ben Wallingford – Foundation
- Columbo (1974 Episode: "Swan Song") as Roland Pangborn
- The Missiles of October (1974) as Former Secretary of State Dean Acheson
- Kolchak: The Night Stalker (1975) as Capt. Vernon Rausch
- Ellery Queen (1975 Episode: "The Adventure of the Blunt Instrument") as George Tisdale
- The Killer Inside Me (1976) as Bob Maples
- Guardian of the Wilderness (1976) as John Muir
- The Rockford Files (1977 Episode: "There's One in Every Port") as Judge Lyman
- Fun with Dick and Jane (1977) as Jane's Father
- The Lincoln Conspiracy (1977) as Col. Lafayette C. Baker
- The Boys from Brazil (1978) as Henry Wheelock

=== 1980s ===
- Nothing Personal (1980) as Senator
- Airplane II: The Sequel (1982) as The Commissioner
- The Winds of War (1983) as Admiral Ernest King
- The Right Stuff (1983) as Henry Luce
- Jagged Edge (1985) as Judge Carrigan
- Creator (1985) as Paul
- War and Remembrance (part VII of miniseries, 1988) as Admiral Ernest King
