= Counterspy (radio series) =

- Other names: David Harding, Counterspy
- Genre: Spy drama
- Running time: 30 minutes
- Country of origin: United States
- Language: English
- Syndicates: Blue Network/ABC; NBC; Mutual
- Starring: Don MacLaughlin
- Announcer: Roger Krupp; Bob Shepherd
- Created by: Phillips H. Lord
- Written by: Milton J. Kramer; Stanley Niss; Emile C. Tepperman
- Directed by: Bill Sweets; Marx Loeb; Leonard Bass; Robert Steen; Victor Seydel
- Produced by: Phillips H. Lord
- Original release: May 18, 1942 – November 29, 1957

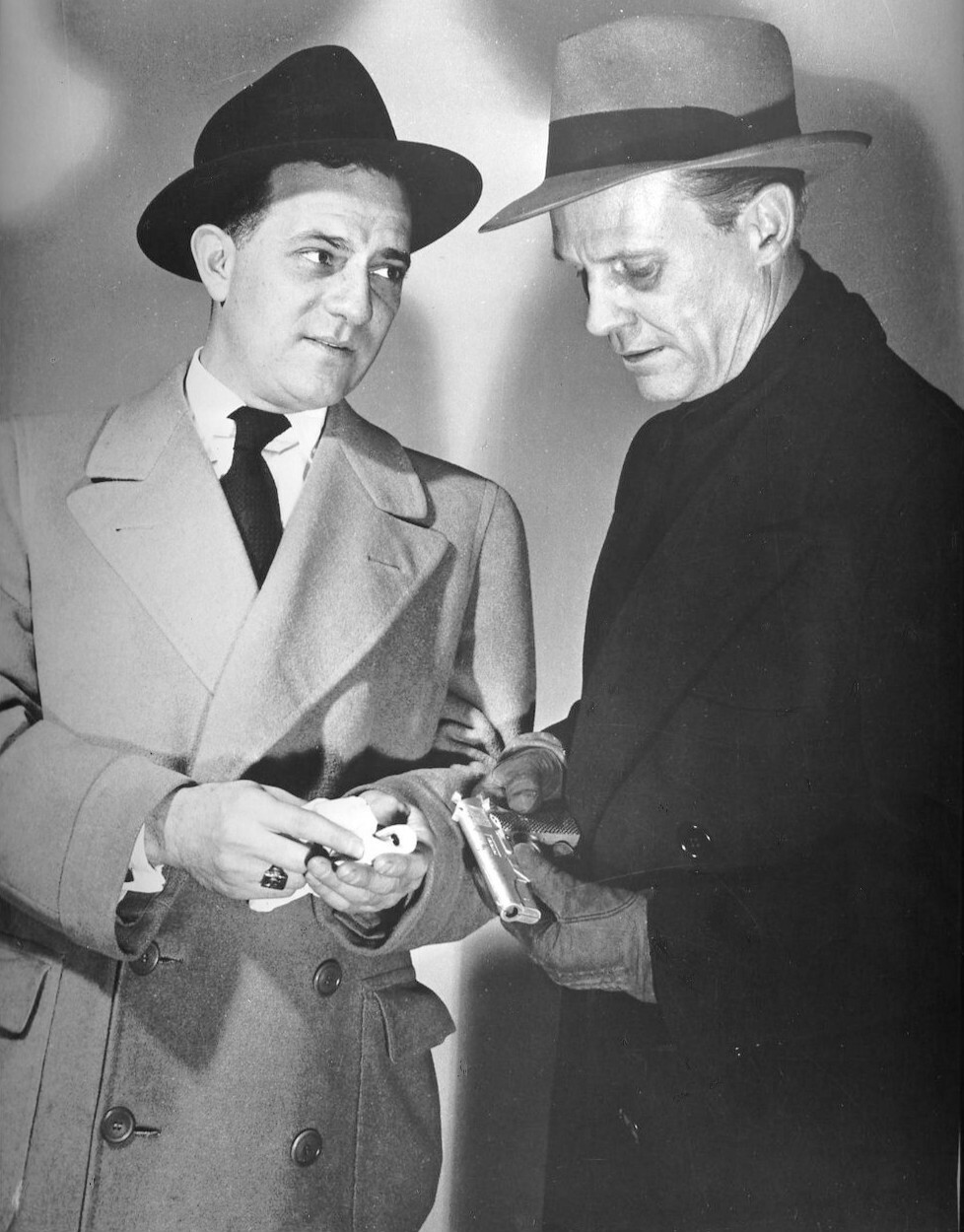
The radio program also found its way onto television. Pictured are Mandel Kramer as Peters (left) and Don McLaughlin as David Harding in 1952.

Counterspy was an espionage drama radio series that aired on the NBC Blue Network (later ABC) and Mutual from May 18, 1942, to November 29, 1957.

David Harding (played by Don MacLaughlin) was the chief of the United States Counterspies, a unit engaged during World War II in counterintelligence against Japan's Black Dragon and Germany's Gestapo. United States Counterspies was a fictional government agency devised by the program's creator, Phillips H. Lord after Lord "had a certain amount of difficulty with J. Edgar Hoover over story content in Gang Busters." Mandel Kramer played Peters, Harding's assistant.

The program's plots progressed through three phases. During World War II they involved "threats from the Axis powers." After the war ended, Cold War threats took precedence. In the third phase, "they addressed all manner of illegal activities.

Scriptwriters for the series included Milton J. Kramer, Emile C. Tepperman and Stanley Niss.

== Adaptations ==
The radio drama was adapted to film twice, as David Harding, Counterspy (July 1950) and as Counterspy Meets Scotland Yard (November 1950). Both Columbia Pictures productions starred Howard St. John in the title role.

An unsuccessful pilot for a television version of Counterspy was produced in England in 1958, with Don Megowan as David Harding. The trade publication Broadcasting also reported on plans of Bernard L. Schubert Inc. to produce 39 episodes of David Harding, Counterspy with Reed Hadley in the title role and Telestar Films' releasing of Counterspy for syndication.

A Spanish version of Counterspy was transmitted to South America via shortwave radio in 1942. An article in Broadcasting reported that commercial were deleted and that the effort was "in cooperation with the Office of the Coordinator of Inter-American Affairs."
