= The Adulterous Woman =

1957 short story by Albert Camus

- Short story by Albert Camus
- Original title: La femme adultère
- Language: French

Publication
- Published in: Exile and the Kingdom
- Publication date: 1957

"The Adulterous Woman" (French: La femme adultère) is a short story by Albert Camus. It is the first short story in his collection Exile and the Kingdom, published in 1957.

The story was written in 1952 and first published in 1954. Although the story's date is not given in the text, references to the war suggest it is set in the early 1940s.

== Characters ==
The story concerns a childless, married, pied noir couple, Janine and Marcel, living in Algeria. Marcel is a merchant and Janine is his assistant. The story is written in the third person from Janine's point of view. Assumed French by birth or descent, the couple live an isolated life in Algeria, neither of them speaking the native Arabic language.

== Plot ==
The story begins with the couple on a business trip through Algeria by bus. It is here that we first learn of the strained relationship between Marcel and Janine. In her thoughts Janine portrays a negative image of her husband who she sees as inert and tied up with his work, having relinquished the passions and ambitions that he possessed as a youth when they met. Janine sees herself as still being attractive in a mature way and reminisces about her adolescence.

Also, a French Algerian soldier is on the bus. The soldier seems interested in Janine, letting it be noticed that he is looking at her and offers her a lozenge from a box in his pocket. Janine welcomes the soldier's attention and this reinforces Janine's opinion that she can still be attractive to men but feels dejected when later nothing comes of it.

The couple stop at a hotel for the night and decide to visit a nearby fort. At the fort Janine feels inspired and is excited by the experience. Marcel contrastingly is totally unmoved and convinces his wife that they should get out of the cold.

Once back at the hotel, Marcel falls asleep in their room. Janine cannot sleep. After consideration, she decides to sneak out of their room that night and return to the fort alone. Once at the fort Janine is overcome with an even stronger feeling of excitement and freedom than when she had sex with her husband. At this point the narrative becomes increasingly dramatic and sensual as Janine runs around the fort feeling charged with life, eventually ending up lying on her back beneath the stars.

Back at the hotel, Marcel wakes up and Janine breaks down into tears. Janine insists that it's nothing and never tells her husband about her frustration or her trip to the fort.

== Motifs ==
=== Biblical reference ===
The title of the story is taken from John 8:3-11 - The Adulterous Woman, in which a mob brings an adulteress before Jesus for judgment, the usual punishment for adultery being death by stoning. Jesus decrees that the first stone be thrown by one who is free from sin; until eventually no one remains. This story from the bible parallels Camus' thinking on Capital Punishment as outlined in Reflections on the Guillotine. Namely, that no authority exists which is capable of passing judgment on another human being because no person possesses absolute innocence.

=== Intent vs. act ===
Contrary to the title, at no point does Janine commit any physical act of adultery. The adultery in question is symbolic and in her own mind. By the end of the story, Janine is only guilty of the thought but it is not clear if she will take further action on her frustration or if she is prepared to go back to how things were before and accept her life. The title could be read as implying that the will to commit the act is equal to the act itself.

=== Lost youth ===
Early in the story, Janine reflects on her adolescence and the period when she met her husband and the choice she had at that time between security and independence. Reacting to various events in the story, Janine's perception of herself changes from awareness of her weight and poor physical condition to pride in still being attractive to other men. The story could be seen as being more about regaining lost youth than adultery itself.

=== Power ===
Throughout the story, Janine is recurringly repelled by her husband because of his inherent inertness, advancing age and lack of vitality. Similarly Janine is attracted to notions of primal vigor and power. The man on the bus by whom she is briefly fixated is a soldier and the place where Janine is reinvigorated with a sense of youth is a fort. Janine did not make love to her husband before visiting the fort. On the other hand, she experienced excitement from gazing at the starry night sky at the fort. This is described in an erotic manner, as if her adultery took place not with another man, but with the night itself in a temporarily empowering liberation from her constricting, married, subservient, and following life.

At the beginning of the story, Janine is described as basing her existence on her husband, that is, he needs her and so she has a reason to exist. However, she is becoming disenchanted with her husband and his narrow ways, his narrow life. On the trip, her view of the world, both literally and figuratively, are widened. From atop the fort she gets a broader view of the world.

She especially identifies herself with the nomads, whose tents she sees in the distance. The nomads are not tied to the town, or to the "civilized" world in general, yet they heroically continue to exist. This, along with the expansiveness of the vista from the fort top, begin to affect Janine in some deep way she cannot explain.

That night, lying in bed next to her husband, she breaks with his narrow neediness and feels called back to the vastness of the desert, as seen from atop the fort. Finally, it is the expanse of the sky and its endless march of stars that overwhelms her. She makes the transition from existing merely as an extension of her husband, to being part of an endlessly larger world. This is her adultery.

=== Pied Noir and the Arabs in Camus' Algeria ===
As with other works of Camus, "The Adulterous Woman" is set in Algeria but native Algerians play no significant part in the story. Marcel especially, displays disdain and distrust for the Arabs; neither he nor Janine have bothered to learn Arabic and whenever Marcel speaks to or about a native Algerian it is to express his disapproval.

One novel which is not set in Algeria, The Fall, set in Amsterdam and initially intended as another story in Exile and the Kingdom, is similarly lacking in any native Dutch characters. Both of the main characters in The Fall are assumed to be French, while Dutch citizens have no dialogue and are never referred to by name.
