= Xanadu (Citizen Kane) =

Fictional estate in the film Citizen Kane

- Citizen Kane location
- Xanadu, as shown in Citizen Kane (1941)
- Created by: Orson Welles; Herman J. Mankiewicz
- Genre: Drama

In-universe information
- Type: Mansion

Xanadu is the fictional estate of Charles Foster Kane, the title character of the film Citizen Kane (1941). The estate derives its name from the ancient city of Xanadu, known for its splendor. Hearst Castle in San Simeon, California, has been considered to be the main inspiration for Xanadu, due to the William Randolph Hearst/Kane comparison that was a large source of controversy after the film's release.

== Appearance in the film ==
Built on an immense "private mountain" located on the "deserts of the Gulf Coast" in Florida, Xanadu is described as being the world's largest private estate; "Cost: no man can say," according to the newsreel at the beginning of the film. The newsreel directly quotes from Samuel Taylor Coleridge's poem Kubla Khan, which tells of the title character's erection of a "stately pleasure-dome" in the city of Xanadu. The newsreel also states that Kane specifically conceived the estate for Susan Alexander, his second wife. However, Susan grew to hate Xanadu, calling it "forty-nine thousand acres [76 square miles, 200 km^{2}] of nothing but scenery and statues." The News on the March description of Xanadu—a pastiche of the style of The March of Time news digests then regularly seen in theaters—is as follows:

Here, on the deserts of the Gulf Coast, a private mountain was commissioned and successfully built. One hundred thousand trees, twenty thousand tons of marble are the ingredients of Xanadu's mountain. Contents of Xanadu's palace: paintings, pictures, statues, the very stones of many another palace — a collection of everything so big it can never be cataloged or appraised; enough for ten museums; the loot of the world. Xanadu's livestock: the fowl of the air, the fish of the sea, the beast of the field and jungle. Two of each; the biggest private zoo since Noah. Like the Pharaohs, Xanadu's landlord leaves many stones to mark his grave. Since the Pyramids, Xanadu is the costliest monument a man has built to himself.

The estate also boasts a championship golf course and a Venetian-style canal with gondolas. The extensive zoo and aquarium were stocked with a menagerie of animals including monkeys, horses, giraffes, birds, octopuses, elephants and donkeys. The estate is enclosed by an iron fence that is entered through a gateway with a giant letter "K" above it. Central to the estate is Xanadu proper, the castle-like mansion that served as Kane's home and repository for his enormous collection of antiquities and objets d'art. Xanadu has a butler and at least a few dozen footmen and maidservants, who are shown at the end of the scene where Kane wrecks his wife's suite after she leaves him.

Oheka Castle in Huntington, New York, was used for some exterior shots of Xanadu (particularly of the formal gardens) seen in the opening newsreel. However, most shots of Xanadu were surrealistic, highly stylized matte paintings. Xanadu makes great use of Gothic architecture and, except in the opening newsreel, it always appears in the film at night with fog surrounding it, giving it an ominous look; for Kane, Xanadu becomes more of a prison than a refuge. Xanadu's interior especially does not appear at all homey or cozy, symbolizing the emptiness of Kane's later life.

The estate is featured in the opening and closing shots of the film, and is where Kane dies, virtually alone. Though he is still fabulously wealthy at the time of his death, Xanadu, still unfinished according to the newsreel, has already fallen into visible disrepair, presumably from neglect and its impractical size. After his death, Xanadu is abandoned and its contents are cataloged and auctioned. Kane's personal effects, including a sled that reveals the meaning of "Rosebud", are incinerated.

== Cultural influence ==
Xanadu has been used in recent times to represent the foolish excess of lavish lifestyles such as Kane's. Various celebrities – for example Michael Jackson with his Neverland Ranch and George Lucas with Skywalker Ranch – have been compared to Kane. Xanadu's symbolic meaning of a prison built to immure oneself resonates to this day. Bill Gates' house has been nicknamed "Xanadu 2.0" in reference to the fictional mansion.

When similarly stylized Gothic buildings appear in film, Xanadu is often considered a source of inspiration and the similarity is often noted by critics.
