= Haunted House (1940 film) =

- Theatrical release poster
- Directed by: Robert F. McGowan
- Screenplay by: Dorothy Davenport
- Story by: Jack Leonard; Monte Collins
- Produced by: William T. Lackey
- Starring: Jackie Moran; Marcia Mae Jones; George Cleveland; Christian Rub; Henry Hall; John St. Polis
- Cinematography: Harry Neumann
- Edited by: Russell F. Schoengarth
- Production company: Monogram Pictures
- Distributed by: Monogram Pictures
- Release date: July 23, 1940
- Running time: 70 minutes
- Country: United States
- Language: English

Haunted House is a 1940 American mystery film directed by Robert F. McGowan and written by Dorothy Davenport. The film stars Jackie Moran, Marcia Mae Jones, George Cleveland, Christian Rub, Henry Hall and John St. Polis. The film was released on July 23, 1940, by Monogram Pictures.

== Plot ==
Jimmie, the Brownsville Bugle's office boy, and Millie, niece of editor Henshaw, turn amateur detectives in order to help a friend who is accused of murder. With more zeal than direction, they pick the owner of a gas station as the killer, and when he turns out to be innocent, Henshaw fires Jimmie. The two go on searching and next suspect Lawyer Cy Burton but have no conclusive evidence and are about to give up when Millie finds a clue that leads to the hidden fortune of the murdered Mrs. Blake.

== Cast ==
- Jackie Moran as Jimmie Atkins
- Marcia Mae Jones as Mildred Henshaw
- George Cleveland as Albert Henshaw
- Christian Rub as Olaf Jensen
- Henry Hall as Cyrus W. 'Cy' Burton
- John St. Polis as Simkins
- Clarence Wilson as Eph
- Mary Carr as Grandma
- Jessie Arnold as Mrs. Emily Henshaw
- Hooper Atchley as Prosecuting Attorney
- Marcelle Ray as Lucy Peters
- Buddy Swan as Junior Henshaw
