= Pirates of the High Seas =

1950 film by Spencer Gordon Bennet, Thomas Carr

- Lobby card
- Directed by: Spencer Gordon Bennet (as Spencer Bennet); Thomas Carr
- Written by: Joseph F. Poland; David Mathews; George H. Plympton; Charles R. Condon
- Produced by: Sam Katzman
- Starring: Buster Crabbe; Lois Hall; Tommy Farrell
- Cinematography: Ira H. Morgan
- Edited by: Earl Turner
- Production company: Sam Katzman Productions
- Distributed by: Columbia Pictures
- Release date: November 2, 1950
- Running time: 260 minutes (15 episodes)
- Country: United States
- Language: English

Pirates of the High Seas is a 1950 American adventure serial film directed by Spencer Gordon Bennet and Thomas Carr and starring Buster Crabbe, Lois Hall and Tommy Farrell.

== Plot ==
Adventurer Jeff Drake sails to a Pacific island in aid of Kelly Walsh, an old friend whose freight line is being sabotaged by a ghost ship (such as the classic Flying Dutchman). Drake and Walsh's investigation concerns the search for Walter Castell, an escaped convict who stole 5 million dollars in diamonds at the close of World War II. Several other people, including Walsh's sister, all want to go to the island. Drake and his friends encounter multiple dangers when they are attacked by a gang also looking for the stolen diamonds led by the mysterious 'Admiral'...

== Cast ==
- Buster Crabbe as Jeff Drake
- Lois Hall as Carol Walsh
- Tommy Farrell as Kelly Walsh
- Gene Roth as Gov. Frederick Whitlock
- Tristram Coffin as Walter Castell (as Tris Coffin)
- Neyle Morrow as Kalana
- Stanley Price as Lamar - Whitlock's Aide
- Hugh Prosser as Roper - Jeff's First Mate [Chs.1-2,5-8]
- Symona Boniface as Lotus Lady
- William Fawcett as Ben Wharton [Chs.7-9]
- Terry Frost as Carter - Patrol 6 Henchman
- Lee Roberts as Barker - Phantom Cruiser Henchman - [Chs.1-4]
- Rusty Wescoatt ad Adams - Phantom Cruiser Henchman
- Pierce Lyden as Durk - Patrol 6 Henchman
- I. Stanford Jolley as Turner - Trader [Ch.1] (as Stanford Jolley)
- Marshall Reed as Shark Wilson - Phantom Cruiser Captain

== Production ==
Pirates of the High Seas qualifies as both a sea and a jungle story, due to action taking place on uncharted islands.

== Chapter titles ==
1. Mystery Mission
2. Attacked by Pirates
3. Dangerous Depths
4. Blasted to Atoms
5. The Missing Mate
6. Secret of the Ivory Case
7. Captured by Savages
8. The Vanishing Music Box
9. Booby Trap
10. Savage Snare
11. Sinister Cavern
12. Blast from the Depths
13. Cave In
14. Secret of the Music Box
15. Diamonds from the Sea

_{Source:}
