= Texas Dynamo =

1950 film by Ray Nazarro

- Theatrical release poster
- Directed by: Ray Nazarro
- Screenplay by: Barry Shipman
- Produced by: Colbert Clark
- Starring: Charles Starrett; Smiley Burnette; Lois Hall; Jock Mahoney; Slim Duncan; John Dehner
- Cinematography: Fayte M. Browne
- Edited by: Paul Borofsky
- Production company: Columbia Pictures
- Distributed by: Columbia Pictures
- Release date: June 1, 1950
- Running time: 54 minutes
- Country: United States
- Language: English

Texas Dynamo is a 1950 American Western film directed by Ray Nazarro and written by Barry Shipman, the 47th of 65 films in the Durango Kid series. The film stars Charles Starrett, Smiley Burnette, Lois Hall, Jock Mahoney, Slim Duncan and John Dehner and was released on June 1, 1950 by Columbia Pictures.

== Cast ==
- Charles Starrett as Steve Drake / The Durango Kid
- Smiley Burnette as Smiley Burnette
- Lois Hall as Julia Beck
- Jock Mahoney as Bill Beck
- Slim Duncan as Slim Duncan
- John Dehner as Stanton
- George Chesebro as Kroger
- Gregg Barton as Luke
- Marshall Bradford as Walt Beck
- Fred F. Sears as Hawkins
- Emil Sitka as Turkey
