= The Growing Stone =

"The Growing Stone" (French: La pierre qui pousse) is a short story by the French writer Albert Camus. It is the final short story in the collection Exile and the Kingdom.

== Plot summary ==
French engineer d'Arrast is driven by a local chauffeur, Socrates, to a town in Iguape, Brazil, where he is to construct a sea-wall to prevent the lower quarters from flooding. After a night-drive through the jungle, D'Arrast wakes in Iguape and is greeted by the notable people of the town. An incident follows when the chief of police, apparently drunk, demands to see d'Arrast's passport and claims it is not in order. The other dignitaries of the town are embarrassed and apologetic, and the judge asks d'Arrast to choose a punishment for the chief of police, which he later refuses to do.

On a tour of the lower quarters of the town, d'Arrast sees the poverty of the poor, black people who live there. He is shown around a hut and offered rum by the daughter of the house as part of his visit, although he feels the hostility of the local people towards him and his guides. On his return, his chauffeur explains the ritual that is to take place that night. Having found a statue of Jesus drifting in from the sea and up the river, the local people had stored it in a cave, where, since then, a stone had grown. Now they celebrated the miracle each year with a festival and a procession.

Socrates and d'Arrast then meet an old sailor who has his own miracle to tell of. He explains how his ship had caught fire and he had fallen from the lifeboat. He recognised the light from the church of Iguape and despite being a weak swimmer was able to swim towards it to safety. The sailor had made a promise to Jesus that, should he be saved, he would carry a stone of 50 kilos to the church in the procession. After telling his story, the sailor invites d'Arrast to come to a different ceremony that evening, with dancing, although he mentions that he himself will not dance as he has his promise to carry out the next day.

As dusk falls, d’Arrast follows the sailor and his brother to a hut near the forest, containing a statue or idol of a horned god, where men and women are dancing. As the drums get louder and faster and the dancers get wilder, d’Arrast’s new friend forgets his decision not to dance and joins the circle. D’Arrast tries to remind him not to dance but is asked to leave the ceremony.

The next day d’Arrast is watching the town procession when he sees his friend of the night before trying to carry out his promise. The sailor is struggling to carry the fifty-kilo stone and falls more than once. D’Arrast goes to walk with him and tries to offer support but it is no use. Utterly exhausted from the previous night’s festivities, the sailor eventually has to abandon his attempt to carry the stone to the church.

When the sailor falls, d’Arrast decides to take over his task for him. He lifts the heavy burden from his friend and carries it towards the church. The stone seems to grow heavier as he goes, and he too struggles. However, he suddenly decides to change his route and carry his burden, not to the church, but downtown to the sailor’s own hut, where he flings it into the centre of the room. As the sailor and his brother catch up with d’Arrast, they react, not with anger, but by asking him to sit and join them.

== Interpretation ==
The first signs of d'Arrast's sympathy with the common people occurs when he refuses to punish the chief of police. Later, he agrees to witness the pre-Christian (though Camus did not believe in culture developing linearly to a Christian standard), African-rooted rituals of the poor people who live in the worst of conditions in the town. On some level, he comes to understand that when the cook chooses to dance the night away, that the pull of the old ways and traditions are stronger to him and his people than the newer religion. His refusal to take the stone into the church, and his choice to instead deposit it in the center of the ritual hut, symbolizes his empathy with them. That they, on some level, understand this is shown by the people's acceptance of him by sitting down beside him in the hut around the stone.

== Publication details ==
- Camus, Albert, "La Pierre qui pousse" from L'Exil et le Royaume (Gallimard, Paris, 1957)
