= Madison Avenue (film) =

1961 film by H. Bruce Humberstone

- Film poster
- Directed by: H. Bruce Humberstone
- Screenplay by: Norman Corwin
- Based on: The Build Up Boys; 1951 novel by Jeremy Kirk
- Produced by: H. Bruce Humberstone
- Starring: Dana Andrews; Eleanor Parker; Jeanne Crain; Eddie Albert
- Cinematography: Charles G. Clarke
- Edited by: Betty Steinberg
- Music by: Harry Sukman
- Production company: Twentieth Century Fox Film Corporation
- Distributed by: Twentieth Century Fox
- Release dates: April 13, 1961 (UK); January 7, 1962 (USA)
- Running time: 90 min
- Country: United States
- Language: English
- Budget: $2 million or $900,000

Madison Avenue is a 1961 CinemaScope drama film directed by H. Bruce Humberstone, starring Dana Andrews, Jeanne Crain and Eleanor Parker. The film was completed in 1960 but was not released immediately. On April 13, 1961, Madison Avenue opened at the Rialto Cinema in London's West End for a two-week run. In late April, the film had a UK general release as part of a double bill with The Little Shepherd of Kingdom Come. The film was not seen in the United States until January 1962.

== Plot ==
Clint Lorimer (Dana Andrews) works for an advertising company run by J.D. Jocelyn (Howard St. John). He is fired after Jocelyn finds out that Clint intends to form his own ad agency and steal a top client.

Out of spite, Clint hatches a scheme to turn a small business, Cloverleaf dairy, into a large and prosperous one through advertising. He approaches reporter Peggy Shannon (Jeanne Crain) to write articles about the dairy, then transforms girlfriend Anne Tremaine (Eleanor Parker), a demure colleague, into a glamorous, dynamic promotional whiz. Clint's next step is to turn Cloverleaf's mild-mannered owner, Harvey Ames (Eddie Albert), into a colorful personality to help publicize the business.

The plan comes apart, first when Peggy grows weary of being used professionally, then when Anne sees a reluctance in Clint to commit to a personal future together and leaves him. A chastised Clint comes back to his senses and decides to pursue a missile project as an account he can bring back to J.D.

== Cast ==
- Dana Andrews as Clint Lorimer
- Eleanor Parker as Anne Tremaine
- Jeanne Crain as Peggy Shannon
- Eddie Albert as Harvey Holt Ames
- Howard St. John as J.D. Jocelyn
- Henry Daniell as Stipe
- Kathleen Freeman as Miss Thelma Haley
- David White as Brock
- Betti Andrews as Katie Olsen

== The Build Up Boys ==
The novel was published in 1951. The Chicago Tribune called it "as breezy and brassy a story as ever have been written on such a theme."

== Production ==
Dana Andrews bought the film rights to the novel. In 1954 he announced he wanted Ava Gardner for the female lead. The project was delayed but was reactivated at 20th Century Fox in 1960 as Madison Avenue. Filming started October 10, 1960.

In April 1961 the film was re-edited by Robert Lippert.

== Reception ==
Release of the film was delayed. Although shot in late 1960 the film did not reach cinemas in the USA until early 1962.

=== Critical ===
Variety complained about the "tiresomely complicated plotting and bloodless characters."

=== Box office ===
The film's poor performance reportedly contributed to the downfall of Fox's head of production, Bob Goldstein. Variety later called the film "throwaway fare" and an example of "the kind of indiscriminate production" that Fox put out in 1960-61.

== See also ==
- List of American films of 1961
