= Horsemen of the Sierras =

1949 film by Fred F. Sears

- Theatrical release poster
- Directed by: Fred F. Sears
- Screenplay by: Barry Shipman
- Produced by: Colbert Clark
- Starring: Charles Starrett; Smiley Burnette; T. Texas Tyler; Lois Hall; Tommy Ivo; John Dehner
- Cinematography: Fayte M. Browne
- Edited by: Paul Borofsky
- Production company: Columbia Pictures
- Distributed by: Columbia Pictures
- Release date: November 22, 1949
- Running time: 56 minutes
- Country: United States
- Language: English

Horsemen of the Sierras is a 1949 American Western film directed by Fred F. Sears and written by Barry Shipman. The film stars Charles Starrett, Smiley Burnette, T. Texas Tyler, Lois Hall, Tommy Ivo and John Dehner. The film was released on November 22, 1949, by Columbia Pictures. This was the fortieth of 65 films in the Durango Kid series.

== Cast ==
- Charles Starrett as Steve Saunders / The Durango Kid
- Smiley Burnette as Smiley Burnette
- T. Texas Tyler as T. Texas Tyler
- Lois Hall as Patty McGregor
- Tommy Ivo as Robin Grant
- John Dehner as Duke Webster
- Jason Robards Sr. as Phineas Grant
- Dan Sheridan as Morgan Webster
- Jock Mahoney as Bill Grant
- George Chesebro as Ellory Webster
