= Charles Foster Kane =

Fictional character from Citizen Kane

- Citizen Kane character
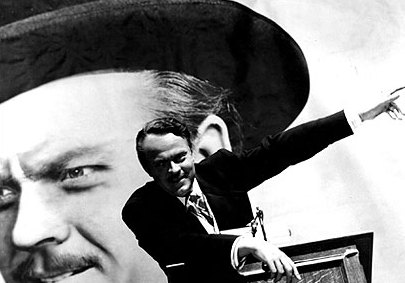
- First appearance: Citizen Kane
- Created by: Herman J. Mankiewicz; Orson Welles
- Portrayed by: Orson Welles; Buddy Swan (as a child)

In-universe information
- Gender: Male
- Occupation: Owner/Publisher of the New York Daily Inquirer
- Family: Jim Kane (father); Mary Kane (mother); Walter Parks Thatcher (legal guardian)
- Spouses: Emily Monroe Norton Kane (m. 1900; div. 1916) Susan Alexander Kane (m. 1916, divorced)
- Children: Charles Foster Kane III (deceased)
- Religion: Christian
- Nationality: American

Charles Foster Kane is a fictional character who is the subject of Orson Welles' 1941 film Citizen Kane. Welles played Kane (receiving the Best Actor Oscar nomination), with Buddy Swan playing Kane as a child. Welles also produced, co-wrote and directed the film, winning an Oscar for writing the film.

== Inspiration ==
The general consensus is that publishing tycoon William Randolph Hearst is the primary inspiration behind Charles Foster Kane.

In the film, Kane is given the line "You provide the prose poems; I'll provide the war," undeniably similar to "You furnish the pictures, and I'll furnish the war," a quotation widely attributed to Hearst. Also, an overhead shot of Hearst's ranch is shown in the film as Xanadu, the lavish estate where Kane resides.

In addition, Kane's unsuccessful attempt to make his second wife an opera star parallels Hearst's effort to make his mistress Marion Davies a serious dramatic movie actress despite critics' complaints that she was miscast and better in light comedy roles. The connection with Hearst is strengthened by the fact that Welles's co-writer, Herman J. Mankiewicz, was a frequent guest of Davies at Hearst Castle.

Some biographies of Welles posit that Welles himself was a source of inspiration for the character. Some of the character's dialogue on how to run a newspaper are direct quotes from Welles's comments on how to make a motion picture (though this was his first). Mankiewicz included dialogue about Kane's voracious appetite, also a reference to Welles.

Later news media figures including Sumner Murray Redstone, Rupert Murdoch, Ted Turner, and Elon Musk have been compared to Kane.

== Fictional character biography ==
Citizen Kane explores the life of the titular character. We are given an overview of his public career in the pastiche News on the March newsreel, with some parts then shown in more detail through the flashback recollections of those who knew him.

=== Early years ===
Kane is born of humble origins in the fictional settlement of Little Salem, Colorado, in 1862 or 1863. (Note: The closing credits state that Kane is aged eight at his first appearance in 1871.) A supposedly worthless mine given to his mother in 1868—to settle a bill for room and board by Fred Graves—is discovered to be rich in gold, making the family suddenly fabulously wealthy. In 1871, in return for an annual income of $50,000, Kane's mother puts her son and the money under the guardianship of New York City banker Walter Parks Thatcher, who raises Kane in luxury. Kane resents Thatcher for ripping him away from his family, and spends most of his early adult life rebelling against him. He attends prestigious colleges such as Harvard, Yale, Princeton, Cornell and a college in Switzerland—and gets himself expelled from all of them.

At the age of 25 Kane acquires control of the money, the world's sixth-largest private fortune. He returns from a trip abroad to take control of the New York Daily Inquirer, (Note: Some reviewers refer to the name of Kane's newspaper as The New York Enquirer, but the name of the newspaper in the film itself is titled the New York Daily Inquirer.) a struggling newspaper acquired on his behalf by Thatcher as a result of a foreclosure on a debt, saying in a telegram that "it would be fun to run a newspaper". He takes up full-time residence in the newspaper office (the sitting editor resigning in protest) and in the first edition publishes a "declaration of principles" stating his duty to be truthful to his readers and to campaign on behalf of the poor and underprivileged. His best friend Jedediah Leland, the Inquirer's drama critic, asks to keep the text of the declaration, feeling it might one day be an important document.

To Thatcher's fury, Kane campaigns against slum landlords, "copper robbers" and "traction trusts" (monopoly control of railways), including companies in which he himself is a major shareholder. To finance the fledgling Inquirer, Kane uses his personal resources, reasoning that this would allow him to operate it, even at a million-dollar annual loss, for 60 years. Over a period of six years, Kane also hires staff members away from the rival Chronicle newspaper, regarding them as collectibles. However, he uses yellow journalism tactics to blow stories out of proportion and encourage a war with Spain in 1898.

=== Political career ===
Kane, whose party affiliation is never explicitly specified, is shown to be a supporter of Theodore Roosevelt, joining him on a whistle stop train tour. (Note: We are not told whether this is Roosevelt's successful campaign for a full term in 1904, after having served most of the term that William McKinley won in 1900, or his unsuccessful bid for a non-consecutive third term in 1912.) "One President at least" owes his election to the support of Kane's newspapers.

Kane eventually marries Emily Monroe Norton, the niece of a President of the United States. (Note: Kane refers to the President as his wife's "Uncle John" and describes him as "a well-meaning fathead who is letting a gang of high-pressure crooks run his administration", and mentions that there is an "oil scandal" taking place. In reality no President who served during the time covered by the film used that name, while the corruption in the fictional administration is likely a reference to the Teapot Dome scandal and other activities of the Ohio Gang under Warren G. Harding.) Their marriage takes place at the White House. The marriage sours because of Kane's egomania, obsession with his newspapers and attacks on her uncle's administration. Their marital problems reach the point that they are barely on speaking terms, with Charles ignoring Emily as she reads the rival Chronicle newspaper at breakfast.

Kane opposes US entry into World War I.

As his popularity increases, Kane, who regards himself and is widely seen as a future President, runs as a "fighting liberal" for Governor of New York in 1916, against corrupt boss James "Jim" W. Gettys. He addresses a packed rally at Madison Square Gardens, (Note: Identified in a newspaper headline in the opening newsreel.) promising to have Gettys arrested and sent to prison. An election victory is almost certain until Gettys reveals evidence of Kane's affair with a young singer named Susan Alexander. Gettys blackmails Kane, meeting with him and his wife at Susan's apartment, but Kane refuses to drop out of the race despite Gettys' leverage. The scandal goes public and Kane loses the election decisively.

The night of Kane's loss, a drunk and disillusioned Leland asks him for a transfer to the Chicago paper. He accuses Kane of treating "the working man" he claims to fight for as a possession, and says that, for all his talk of helping the less fortunate, the only person Kane really cares about is himself. Kane allows him to transfer to Chicago, effectively ending their friendship.

Emily divorces Kane shortly afterward, and dies two years later, along with their son, in a car accident.

=== Later life ===
Two weeks after his first divorce, Kane marries Susan in a small ceremony at the City Hall in Trenton, New Jersey. He forces her into a doomed and humiliating career as an opera singer, building an opera house in Chicago (Note: The main Chicago Civic Opera House was actually built by Samuel Insull, a tycoon of the era.) specially for her. Leland, now a drama critic for the Chicago Inquirer, refuses to toe the company line by praising Alexander's performances. Leland becomes too drunk at the difficult task of writing a truthful review against Kane's wishes, and falls into a stupor. Kane visits the paper's newsroom and finishes the review with Leland's negative tone intact, intending to prove that he still has integrity; he then fires Leland. In retaliation, Leland refuses his severance package and mails back the torn-up check with the original copy of Kane's "declaration of principles", which Kane angrily destroys.

After Susan attempts suicide, Kane releases her from her disastrous operatic career and spends most of his time at Xanadu, his gigantic Gothic chateau, full of objets d'art which he has acquired over the decades, and built on an artificial mountain on his vast estate in Florida. By 1925 Kane is being denounced as a "communist" by the aged Thatcher to a congressional committee, and in the same month as an enemy of the working man and a "fascist" by a speaker at a public rally in Union Square, Manhattan. He insists that he is simply "an American". The business downturns of the Great Depression—as well as Kane's excessive spending habits on the crumbling and unfinished Xanadu—forces him to downsize his media empire. He is also forced to hand over financial management of his businesses, although not operational control of his newspapers, to the aged Thatcher. (Note: We are not told whether Thatcher takes an ownership stake or makes a large loan with stringent conditions, although he tells Kane that he might yet die richer than him (i.e., Kane must still have considerable assets). Bernstein insists that they simply have cashflow problems rather than being formally bankrupt.) Susan is unable to stand the monotonous routine inside the cavernous mansion and Kane's increasingly domineering nature, and eventually leaves him. (Note: We are not told exactly when. Years clearly pass with them living at Xanadu, and when she leaves him Kane is an elderly man who walks stiffly, similar to his appearance in the balcony scene with Hitler. When she is interviewed in 1941 the reporter tells her "the last ten years have been hard on a lot of people", so presumably she left him some time in the early to mid 1930s.)

Kane continues to travel and meet with world leaders. He returns from an aeroplane trip to Europe in 1935, declaring that he has met with the leaders of "England, France, Germany and Italy" and that "there will be no war". He initially supports Adolf Hitler, with whom he appears on a balcony, but later denounces him. He also meets with but denounces Francisco Franco.

=== Death ===
Kane eventually becomes a recluse at Xanadu, living alone and estranged from all his friends and no longer wielding much influence over politics. Most of his giant estate is now overgrown, with most of the animals gone from its zoos. He dies in the presence of his butler Raymond in his bedroom one night in 1941, after uttering his last word, "Rosebud."

The death of the "Great Yellow Journalist" is a national news event and is the lead story in many newspapers. His own Inquirer chain devotes the entire front page to him, praising him for his "lifetime of service" and stating that the "entire nation mourns". The rival Chronicle is less complimentary, recalling his "stormy career" and stating that "few … will mourn" him. The Chicago Globe also mentions his "stormy career" and denounces him as "US Fascist No 1"; the last two papers run unflattering photographs of him. The Minneapolis Record Herald praises him as the "Sponsor of Democracy", the Detroit Star as "Leader of [the] News World" and a "Man of Destiny", but the El Paso Journal accuses him of having "Instigated War for Profit". His death is also covered in the French, Japanese, Spanish and Russian press.

Reporter Jerry Thompson is assigned to find out what "Rosebud" means. Despite interviewing all of Kane's living acquaintances, he never finds out what it is. After the reporters depart, his staff start burning in an incinerator those of his possessions which they see as trash. The viewer sees that the word "Rosebud" was written on the sled Kane's parents gave him as a young boy, and left behind at his mother's boarding house when he was sent away to live with Thatcher. It is implied earlier in the film that Kane found the sled in a warehouse, where he had been looking over his late mother's possessions, around the time he first met Susan.

== Relationships ==
=== Susan Alexander ===
Susan Alexander Kane (Dorothy Comingore) was Kane's second wife. She was 21 when they first met in the mid-1910s (Kane would have been at least 50); she is evidently low class and is in charge of the sheet music at a shop. Kane was attracted to her because she liked him for himself, despite not knowing he was a public figure. Kane sets her up in a larger and more comfortable apartment with an African American maid, (Note: At their first meeting, she plays the piano and sings for Kane in the parlour of her boarding house; when Kane applauds her at the end, she is more expensively dressed and in a more luxurious room than when she started.) which Gettys describes as a "Love nest" to implicate her as Kane's mistress; the film does not make it clear whether she really was. However, a mere two weeks after his first wife divorced him in 1916, Kane married Susan.

Susan enjoyed singing when she and Kane first met, but knows she is not particularly talented. Despite this, Kane tried to force her into a career as an opera singer, even building an opera house specifically for her, in which she performs the leading role in a fictional opera Salammbo. Her weak voice and poor acting attract the derision of the audience and of the stage hands. Kane's Xanadu estate was built at least in part to please her. Susan is the last of Kane's friends to leave him as well as the original owner of the snow globe he drops after saying "rosebud". As of 1941, she is still living, but is an alcoholic. Despite having "lost all her money" she is running a run-down nightclub ("El Rancho") in Atlantic City, which is where Jerry Thompson interviews her.

=== Jedediah Leland ===
Jedediah Leland (Joseph Cotten) was a close friend of Kane, having met him in college. According to Mr. Bernstein, he came from a wealthy family that lost all their money. He is generally acknowledged to represent the morality and idealism Kane himself loses as the film progresses. During Kane's campaign for Governor, he is seen addressing a small audience in the street shortly before Kane's speech. In disgust at Kane's throwing away of the election, he moves to Chicago to work as drama critic for the Inquirer in that city; by the time he writes his bad review of Susan Alexander's operatic debut, he and Kane have not spoken in a number of years. In 1941 Jedediah lives in a nursing home in Manhattan, where Jerry Thompson interviews him.

=== Walter Thatcher ===
Walter Parks Thatcher (George Coulouris) is a New York banker. He becomes Kane's legal guardian in 1871. Kane resents him and, when he comes into control of his fortune in the late 1880s, uses the Inquirer to harass him. Thatcher, clearly getting on in years by the 1890s, initially regards Kane as mentally "still the college boy" and urges him to greater financial prudence. In a scene in the newsreel in 1925, Thatcher, described as the "grand old man of Wall Street", tells a congressional investigation that Kane is a Communist. Thatcher is still alive, presumably at least in his nineties, after the Crash of 1929, and takes control of Kane's failing business empire, although allowing Kane to retain "a considerable measure of control" over his newspapers and reassuring Kane that the Depression is merely temporary and that he might yet die richer than him. When Thatcher asks Kane what he would have liked to have been, Kane replies "Everything you hate". He is dead by 1941, his unpublished memoirs kept in a vault.

=== Mr. Bernstein ===
Mr. Bernstein (Everett Sloane) is a business executive and by 1941 is Chairman of the Board of Directors of Kane's business interests. Having served as Kane's personal assistant since at least when he took over the Inquirer, Bernstein proved the most loyal to the man. He is on good enough terms to visit and leave a present for Kane's infant son, to Mrs. Kane's irritation. Bernstein willingly participated in indulging Kane's obsession in his wife's operatic career even though it was ill-considered by everyone else. However, he has scruples such as advising his employer not to make promises he cannot keep in his Declaration of Principles.

== Wealth and empire ==
Apart from the New York Inquirer, Kane publishes similar Inquirer newspapers in Chicago, Detroit, Philadelphia, San Francisco, and other major American cities. The News on the March newsreel at the beginning of the film also states that Kane controls two newspaper syndicates and a radio network; it also mentions that Kane has other business interests in real estate, logging, shipping, and food retailing. However, Kane's empire largely collapses at the onset of the Great Depression, and he is forced to hand financial control of his remaining holdings (although not operational control of his newspapers) to Thatcher. Kane has enough wealth to build Chicago's opera house, as well as his unfinished mansion, Xanadu.

The mansion contains Kane's vast collection of classical sculptures and art, and the newsreel states that portions of Xanadu were taken from other famous palaces overseas.
