= Mary Ryan, Detective =

1949 film directed by Abby Berlin

- Theatrical poster for the film
- Directed by: Abby Berlin
- Screenplay by: George Bricker
- Story by: Harry Fried
- Produced by: Rudolph Flothow
- Starring: Marsha Hunt; John Litel; June Vincent
- Cinematography: Vincent J. Farrar
- Edited by: James Sweeney
- Music by: Mischa Bakaleinikoff
- Color process: Black and white
- Production company: Columbia Pictures
- Release date: November 3, 1949 (US)
- Running time: 68 minutes
- Country: United States
- Language: English

Mary Ryan, Detective is a 1949 American crime drama, directed by Abby Berlin, which stars Marsha Hunt, John Litel, and June Vincent.

== Plot ==
Two female thieves exploit the naivety of one thief's young daughter to steal valuables from jewelry stores. When police detective Mary Ryan uncovers the ruse, the two women are arrested and incarcerated. At the suggestion of her superiors, Detective Ryan is trained as a pickpocket. She is then sent undercover. She poses as a hardened con artist and is assigned to the same jail cell as one of the thieves. Over time, Ryan uncovers the network of fences the two women relied on, thus becoming involved in an intricate, risky chain of events that nearly leads to her own demise.

== Cast ==
- Marsha Hunt as Mary Ryan, also known as Mae Smith
- John Litel as Captain Billings
- June Vincent as Estelle Byron
- Harry Shannon as Sawyer
- Wm. "Bill" Phillips as Joey Gurney
- Katherine Warren as Mrs. Sawyer
- Victoria Horne as Wilma Hall
- John Dehner as Belden
