= The Renegade (short story) =

1957 short story by Albert Camus

"The Renegade or a Confused Spirit" (Fr: "Le Renégat ou un esprit confus") is a short story written by French writer Albert Camus. It was first published as the second story in his 1957 collection Exile and the Kingdom.

== Plot summary ==
"The Renegade" is one of the most obscure and confusing of the short stories published in Exile and the Kingdom. It is presumed to be an allegory. The story begins with the narrator, who we are told has somehow lost his tongue, waiting in the desert with a rifle. Much of what the narrator says at the beginning of the story is not explained until much later.

After the opening pages in the desert which are set in the narrator's present, the narrator recounts events from his past which begin to explain his present nature and situation. The narrator, a French Catholic from the Protestant Massif Central region, left his home to work as a Christian missionary to the Tribes in the closed city of Taghaza, Mali. His mentor warns him that he is not yet ready for such a task but in his self-confessed 'pig-headedness' he decides to go anyway. Upon arrival, his guide turns on him and robs him leaving him in the desert.

The narrator has more misfortune in store as he arrives at Taghaza and is imprisoned and beaten by the men and women of the Tribe. After several days of isolation he is taken to the House of the Fetish where the tribe's priest and several men and women engage in worship rituals in front of Fetish. During the rituals the narrator and several others are physically and mentally abused. Eventually the narrator is converted by the tribe that he came to convert. He disowns Christ, refusing to believe in his righteousness and declares that the Fetish and the power of hatred are the only true and flawless powers in the world.

The narrator relates of one day when the priest without his mask brings a woman into the House of the Fetish. The woman has a tattoo across her face in the image of the Fetish and is left prostrate on the floor in front of the fetish itself as the priest leaves. It is implied here that the narrator attempts to engage with the woman (although nothing explicit is described) but is caught by the priest who returns with several tribesmen. They beat him and remove his tongue, causing him to pass out on the floor.

Some time later the narrator learns that another missionary is to be sent to look after the children in Taghaza but that a garrison of twenty French soldiers is to be maintained to ensure the missionary's safety (possibly a result of the narrator's disappearance). Upon learning this, he decides to escape the day before the missionary is due to arrive, steal a rifle and kill him.

In killing the missionary, the narrator intends to instigate a conflict between the French and the Tribe. Although it seems this is not to effect revenge on his captors but to give the tribe a chance to conquer and spread throughout Europe.

Eventually the missionary and his guide appear on the horizon and the narrator fires on them. Wounding his target, the narrator closes in and beats the missionary to death. The narrator comments on how good it feels to strike the face of goodness with his rifle butt. As soon as the new missionary is dead the tribesmen come for the narrator; alerted by his gunfire.

The story ends with the recapture and torture/execution of the narrator. The narrator compares himself to the martyred Christ; asking why the Fetish has forsaken him and declaring his love for the nails which crucify him. When the narrator realizes that the Fetish is not coming to save him and the powers of "good" are winning, he wonders if he's made a mistake and chosen the wrong side. He hastily tries to convert back to the side of good and mercy, but as he babbles his narration ends. The narrative switches to a third person point of view for the closing line: "A fistful of salt fills the mouth of the babbling slave."

== Style ==
The style Camus employs in "The Renegade" is representative of the fictional narrator and can sometimes be difficult to decipher. The story is written in the first person perspective and just like the narrator, the language is muddled, disjointed and disorganized; leaving the reader to piece together the facts from the hysterical and neurotic monologue.

== Motifs ==
Camus stated: “I do not believe in God and I am not an atheist." In his essay "The Myth of Sisyphus", Camus states that religious faith is a form of suicide; a distraction from the real in which the individual embraces the Absurd and abandons reason and logic. In "The Renegade", Camus portrays the Absurd nature of religion. The events which cause the narrator the most suffering: the loss of his tongue, his presumed execution and his decision to leave his home and travel to Taghaza are all results of him making decisions which to him seem right according to his religious beliefs at the time.

There is also the Absurd juxtaposition between the perceived right of religion and the violent and harmful means which the tribe and the narrator use to achieve it. Present also, is the Absurd notion that virtue creates sin. In the house of the Fetish, the Tribe presents the woman to the narrator, the woman submits to him and the tribe do not attempt to stop him but after the narrator has acted on his urges he is immediately and severely punished.

At the end, when the narrator compares himself to Jesus on the cross, there is also the parallel that the narrator's actions will be the cause of further bloodshed.

Throughout the story there are themes of dominance and oppression. The narrator travels to Taghaza with the intention of converting the natives to his own beliefs. Once captured by the tribe the narrator is oppressed physically and mentally by his captors until he bends to their will. At several points, the narrator also says that he wants to be offended, he wants to be oppressed, so that he can fight back and take control of his actions and his life by overcoming the adversities set against him.
