= Lois Hall =

American actress (1926–2006)

Lois Grace Hall (August 22, 1926 – December 21, 2006) was an American actress and, more often known as Lois Willows after her marriage, an active member of the Bahá'í Faith communities of California and Hawaii.

== Early years ==
Hall was born on August 22, 1926, in Grand Rapids, Minnesota. She grew up initially in Pengilly, Minnesota, where he father worked as a salesman for a tile factory. Initially, her father moved to Long Beach, California, where he worked as a realtor circa 1935-40, and then whole family moved there in Hall's childhood and went on to attend Woodrow Wilson High School as it was called then. That's also where an art teacher connected her with a chance to work on set design and was connected with the Pasadena Playhouse which was her entré into theatre and seeing actors. She eventually gained a scholarship there.

== Career ==
Hall's television appearances included Studio One, The Cisco Kid, Episode 112 of The Lone Ranger, Adventures of Superman, Highway Patrol, Marcus Welby, M.D., the penultimate episode of Little House on the Prairie and Star Trek: The Next Generation. She also guest-starred in TV series such as CSI, Cold Case, Six Feet Under, Nip/Tuck, and The Unit.

Hall's film debut came in Every Girl Should Be Married (1948). She also appeared in Love Happy (1949), My Blue Heaven (1950), Carrie (1952), Night Raiders (1952), Seven Brides for Seven Brothers (1954) in small roles, as well as in starring roles in pictures like Daughter of the Jungle (1949) and Pirates of the High Seas (1950). She is perhaps best known for her supporting role as Sister Constance in Kenneth Branagh's 1991 drama Dead Again. She was also seen in the hit films Gone in 60 Seconds (2000) and Flightplan (2005).

== Personal life ==
She was a member of the Baháʼí Faith and served in a variety of capacities across more than forty years. Her parents' home address in 1950 was visible hosting occasional Bahá'í meetings from the summer of 1948, though Hall herself was living in Los Angeles by 1950. Hall was herself visible giving talks on the religion by 1951. In 1953, Hall married Maurice Sheppard “Maury” Willows Jr., Former state police chief Robert B. Powers represented the Los Angeles Bahá'í Spiritual Assembly for performing the service. In 1957 the couple hosted the Bahá'í wedding of Lisa Montell at their then home in Benedict Canyon, Los Angeles. By about 1960, the couple was visible in Hawaii promoting the religion and living life. In 1961 they attended the Bahá'í national convention for the US in Chicago, and also attended the first Bahá'í World Congress which was held in London in 1963. In 1964 they served on the spiritual assembly of Honolulu. From about 1968 and onward, Maurice and the couple were visible in southern California again, where again she had some acting jobs. In 1984 the couple taught a session of classes at the Bosch Bahá'í School. By the 1990s Hall was known as a long-serving secretary of the Local Spiritual Assembly of the Baháʼís of Los Angeles. She also worked with the Human Relations Council for the City of Los Angeles, planning cross-cultural events and helping arrange after-school tutoring and enrichment classes for at-risk young people. In 1994 the Bahá'ís of the Los Angeles area gave them a party in recognition of their many years of service. The way they handled their informal meetings to introduce the religion to people in their homes in Hawaii and California was lauded by many individuals, including Judge Dorothy Wright Nelson and her husband, and by the Universal House of Justice, the elected institution governing the worldwide Baháʼí community.

Her husband, Maurice Willows, died in 1995; the couple had three daughters.

Hall died in Beverly Hills, California, of a heart attack and stroke on December 21, 2006, aged 80.

== Partial filmography ==
- Family Honeymoon (1948) - Girl (uncredited)
- Every Girl Should Be Married (1948) - Girl (uncredited)
- Daughter of the Jungle (1949) - Ticoora
- Duke of Chicago (1949) - Helen Cunningham
- Roaring Westward (1949) - Susan Braden
- Love Happy (1949) - Young Woman (uncredited)
- Horsemen of the Sierras (1949) - Patty McGregor
- Adventures of Sir Galahad (1949 serial) - Lady of the Lake
- A Woman of Distinction (1950) - Stewardess (uncredited)
- Kill the Umpire (1950) - Secretary (uncredited)
- Texas Dynamo (1950) - Julia Beck
- Rogues of Sherwood Forest (1950) - Pretty Girl (uncredited)
- The Petty Girl (1950) - Coca-Cola Petty Girl (uncredited)
- My Blue Heaven (1950) - Adoptive Mother (uncredited)
- Cherokee Uprising (1950) - Mary Lou Harrison
- Pirates of the High Seas (1950) - Carol Walsh
- Joe Palooka in the Squared Circle (1950) -Anne Howe Palooka
- Frontier Outpost (1950) - Alice Tanner
- Colorado Ambush (1951) - Janet Williams
- Cuban Fireball (1951) - Stewardess (uncredited)
- Blazing Bullets (1951) - Carol Roberts
- Secrets of Monte Carlo (1951) - Susan Reeves
- Slaughter Trail (1951) - Susan Wilson - School Teacher (uncredited)
- Close to My Heart (1951) - Young Mother (uncredited)
- Texas City (1952) - Lois Upton
- Night Raiders (1952) - Laura Davis
- Carrie (1952) - Lola (uncredited)
- The Congregation (1952)
- Here Come the Girls (1953) - Belle (uncredited)
- Seven Brides for Seven Brothers (1954) - Girl (uncredited)
- A Woman for All Men (1975) - Sarah / housekeeper
- Prime Risk (1985) - Dr. Holt
- Star Trek: The Next Generation (1989) - Dr. Mary Warren
- Dead Again (1991) - Sister Constance
- Cuba Libre (1999) - Loretta
- Gone in 60 Seconds (2000) - Old Woman
- Bad Boy (2002) - Mrs. Wickman
- CSI: Crime Scene Investigation (2003 TV series) - Madeline Foster
- Lost (2004) - Old Woman
- Flightplan (2005) - Main Deck Grandma
