= Secrets of Monte Carlo =

1951 film by George Blair

- Directed by: George Blair
- Written by: John K. Butler
- Produced by: William T. Lackey
- Starring: Warren Douglas; Lois Hall; June Vincent; Stephen Bekassy
- Cinematography: Walter Strenge
- Edited by: Irving M. Schoenberg
- Music by: Stanley Wilson
- Production company: Republic Pictures
- Distributed by: Republic Pictures
- Release date: June 15, 1951 (Los Angeles)
- Running time: 60 minutes
- Country: United States
- Language: English

Secrets of Monte Carlo is a 1951 American crime film directed by George Blair and starring Warren Douglas, Lois Hall and June Vincent.

== Plot ==
In Hong Kong, a British insurance investigator and an American businessman join forces to recover the jewels of a raja that had been recently stolen by a gang on the French Riviera.

== Cast ==
- Warren Douglas as Bill Whitfield
- Lois Hall as Susan Reeves
- June Vincent as Stella Strutzenbacher
- Stephen Bekassy as Otto Von Herzen
- Robin Hughes as Charles Reeves
- Otto Waldis as Louis Gunther
- Charles La Torre as Tony Retella
- Philip Ahn as Wong
- Isabel Randolph as Mrs. Gussy
- Charles Lung as Rajah of Bandore
- Sue Casey as Wife of Rajah
- Georges Renavent as Inspector Marcel Remy
- Bruce Lester as British Inspector
- George Davis as Pierre
- Howard Chuman as Ah Fong
- Gino Corrado as Maitre d'Hotel
- Hal Gerard as Detective
- Albert Pollet as Officer
- Tom Steele as Henri - the Chauffeur
- Ken Terrell as Renault
- Victor Sen Yung as Chinese Clerk

== Reception ==
In a contemporary review for the New York Daily News, critic Wanda Hale wrote: "Unpretentious, 'Secrets of Monte Carlo' was made solely to entertain and that it does, in a small way. Acting and direction are capable in this smooth little Republic picture."

== Bibliography ==
- Fetrow, Alan G. Feature films, 1950-1959: a United States filmography. McFarland & Company, 1999.
