= Buddy Swan =

American actor (1929–1993)

- Born: Paul Swan; October 24, 1929; Los Angeles, California, U.S.
- Died: March 21, 1993 (aged 63); Colorado Springs, Colorado, U.S.
- Other name: Buddy Swann
- Occupation: Actor
- Years active: 1940–1952

Paul "Buddy" Swan (October 24, 1929 – March 21, 1993) (also credited as Buddy Swann) was an American child actor, best known for playing the title character of the 1941 film Citizen Kane as a child.

He also appeared in the horror film The Ape, the horror comedy Scared Stiff, and the Academy-Award nominated film The Fighting Sullivans, playing one of the Sullivan brothers in their youth.

Swan also appeared as a young actor in Broadway plays in 1942, including Mr. Sycamore.

== Filmography ==
Title	Year	Role	Notes
Haunted House	1940	Junior Henshaw	
The Ape	1940	Willie Brill	Uncredited
Citizen Kane	1941	Kane, age eight	
The Fighting Sullivans	1944	George Sullivan as a Child	Uncredited
The Seventh Cross	1944	Boy	Uncredited
The Soul of a Monster	1944	Second Newsboy	Uncredited
Sweet and Low-Down	1944	Tony Birch	Uncredited
Strange Affair	1944	Newsboy	Uncredited
The Horn Blows at Midnight	1945	Kid	Uncredited
Scared Stiff	1945	Oliver Waldeck	
Centennial Summer	1946	Dudley Rogers	
Gallant Journey	1946	Sharkey	Uncredited
Command Decision	1948	Flyer	Uncredited
Shockproof	1949	Teenage Boy	Uncredited
Roaring Westward	1949	Perry Andrews	
Prejudice	1949	Eddie	Uncredited
Military Academy with That Tenth Avenue Gang	1950	Williams	Uncredited
Destination Murder	1950	Arthur – Blue Streak Messenger	
A Modern Marriage	1950	Spike	
One Minute to Zero	1952		Uncredited
