= June Vincent =

American actress (1920–2008)

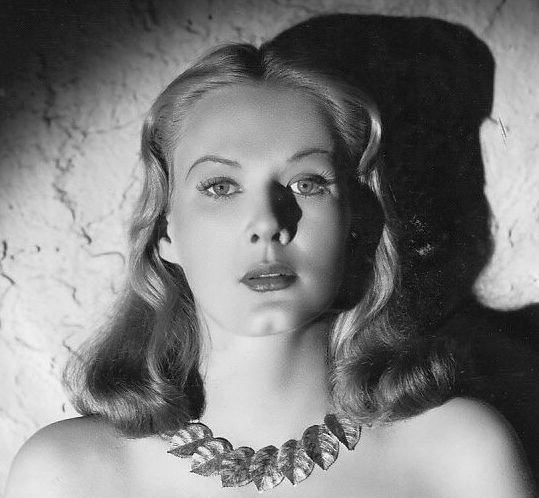
- Born: Dorothy June Smith; July 17, 1920; Harrod, Ohio, U.S.
- Died: November 20, 2008 (aged 88); Aurora, Colorado, U.S.
- Occupation: Actress
- Years active: 1943–1976
- Known for: Black Angel; The Creeper; Can't Help Singing
- Spouse: William M. Sterling (m. 1940; died 2002)
- Children: 3

June Vincent (born Dorothy June Smith; July 17, 1920 – November 20, 2008) was an American actress.

== Life and career ==
Vincent was born in Harrod, Ohio, the daughter of Sybil Irwin and the Rev. Willis E. Smith.

=== Stage ===
Vincent's acting career began in Keene, New Hampshire, where she acted in summer theater. A newspaper article published July 7, 1944, reported, "she was urged to go to Hollywood by talent scouts. Universal promptly signed her." (A different version of Vincent's going to Hollywood appears in the book Ladies of the Western: Interviews with Fifty-One More Actresses from the Silent Era to the Television Westerns of the 1950s and 1960s. Michael G. Fitzgerald and Boyd Magers quote Vincent's recollection, "I was a model – someone saw my picture – and I landed a stock contract at Universal".)

She returned to the stage in 1957, appearing in The Man on a Stick at the Pasadena Playhouse.

=== Film and television ===
Vincent began her career in film in the early 1940s. After making 50 films, she retired from that field when her second child was born.

She later became a successful television actress appearing in many programs throughout the 1950s, 1960s, and 1970s. She appeared in three episodes of Have Gun - Will Travel and she made five guest appearances on Perry Mason including the roles of Madge Wainwright in the 1959 episode, "The Case of the Bartered Bikini," and title character and murder victim/villainess Laura Randall in the 1961 episode, "The Case of the Wintry Wife."

== Personal life ==
Vincent was married to William M. Sterling in 1940 by Vincent's father, Reverend Willis E. Smith. They had a son, William Thayer Sterling, and a daughter, Tina Sterling. Their third child was singer songwriter Mindy Sterling (not to be confused with actress Mindy Sterling).

Vincent was raised in the Congregationalist faith, a reflection of her upbringing as the daughter of the Reverend Willis E. Smith, who oversaw the First Congregational Church in Keene, New Hampshire. She maintained this faith throughout her entire life. Politically, she maintained lifelong conservative convictions and was an active member of both the Hollywood Republican Committee and the Motion Picture Alliance for the Preservation of American Ideals. During her acting career, she publicly engaged with partisan politics by endorsing and campaigning for presidential candidates Thomas E. Dewey, Dwight D. Eisenhower, Richard Nixon, and Gerald Ford. Following her retirement from acting, Vincent continued her political involvement through active support and endorsements of the campaigns of Ronald Reagan, George H.W. Bush, and George W. Bush.

== Death ==
Vincent died on November 20, 2008, in Aurora, Colorado. She was cremated through the All Veterans Burial and Cremation in Aurora, Colorado, and her ashes were scattered into Arapahoe Lake in Colorado.

== Filmography ==
Film
Year	Title	Role	Notes
1943	Honeymoon Lodge	Carol Sterling Crump	
1944	Sing a Jingle	Muriel Crane	
1944	Ladies Courageous	Mary Frances	
1944	The Climax	Marcellina	
1944	Can't Help Singing	Jeannie McLean	
1945	Here Come the Co-Eds	Diane Kirkland	
1945	That's the Spirit	Libby Cawthorne Gogarty	
1946	Black Angel	Catherine Bennett	Alternative title: The Black Angel
1948	Song of Idaho	Eve Allen	
1948	The Challenge	Vivian Bailey	
1948	Trapped by Boston Blackie	Doris Bradley	
1948	Shed No Tears	Edna Grover	
1948	The Arkansas Swing	Pamela Trent	
1948	The Creeper	Gwen Runstrom	
1949	The Lone Wolf and His Lady	Grace Duffy	
1949	Zamba	Jenny	
1949	Mary Ryan, Detective	Estelle Byron	
1950	In a Lonely Place	Actress in Convertible	Uncredited
1950	Counterspy Meets Scotland Yard	Barbara Taylor	
1951	Secrets of Monte Carlo	Stella Strutzenbacher	
1952	Colorado Sundown	Carrie Hurley	
1952	Night Without Sleep	Emily Morton	
1952	The WAC from Walla Walla	Doris Vail	Alternative title: Army Capers
1953	Clipped Wings	Doreen Thompson	
1953	Marry Me Again	Miss Craig	
1955	City of Shadows	Linda Fairaday	
1959	The Miracle of the Hills	Mrs. Leonard	
Television
Year	Title	Role	Notes
1951	Racket Squad	Marian Paulsen	1 episode
1953	The Abbott and Costello Show	Agnes	1 episode
1955	Father Knows Best	Mrs. Leslie Morell	1 episode
1956	Medic	Veda Talley	1 episode
1957	Dr. Christian	Angela	1 episode
1957	Trackdown	Mrs. Howard	The Wedding
1957	Have Gun - Will Travel	Maria Rojas	Strange Vendetta
1957	Have Gun - Will Travel	Martha Lathrop	The Colonel and the Lady
1958	Dick Powell's Zane Grey Theater	Abby Fraser	1 episode
1958–1961	Perry Mason	various characters	5 episodes
1959	Wanted: Dead or Alive	Stella Winter	1 episode
1960	Peter Gunn	Lisa Nye	1 episode
1960	Richard Diamond, Private Detective	Grace Williams	Double Trouble
1960	The Rifleman	Jenny Morgan	1 episode - The Visitor
1960	One Step Beyond	Ruth Graham	"Vanishing Point"
1960	Have Gun - Will Travel	Mrs. Decker	The Broken Image
1961	The Untouchables	Mrs. Randall	1 episode
1961–1962	Hawaiian Eye	Agnes Rondell	2 episodes
1962	Route 66	Dr. Anna Martin	"From An Enchantress Fleeing"
1962	Target: The Corruptors	Alicia Farmer	"Fortress of Despair"
1962	Tales of Wells Fargo	Grace Adams	"The Wayfarers"
1963	The Lieutenant	Martha	"A Touching of Hands"
1963	Mr. Novak	Mrs. Wilder	"Love in the Wrong Season"
1964	Alfred Hitchcock Presents	Ruth Prine	" The Ordeal of Mrs. Snow"
1965	The Andy Griffith Show	The Actress	1 episode
1966	That Girl	Mom	1 episode
1966	Honey West	Victoria Tilson	"Like Visions and Omens... and All That Jazz"
1966	Voyage to the Bottom of the Sea (TV series)	Ava	"The Death Ship"
1967	Family Affair	Sheila	1 episode
1967	Ironside	Mrs Chase	"The Past Is Prologue"
1969	Bewitched	Cynthia Monteagle	1 episode
1971–1972	Bright Promise	Dr. Amanda Winninger	Unknown episodes
1973	Kung Fu	Meg	1 episode
1976	Maude	Ursula Harrison	1 episode, (final appearance)
