= Roaring Westward =

1949 film by Oliver Drake

- Theatrical release poster
- Directed by: Oliver Drake
- Screenplay by: Ronald Davidson
- Produced by: Louis Gray
- Starring: Jimmy Wakely; Dub Taylor; Dennis Moore; Lois Hall; Jack Ingram; Claire Whitney
- Cinematography: Marcel Le Picard
- Edited by: Carl Pierson
- Production company: Monogram Pictures
- Distributed by: Monogram Pictures
- Release date: September 15, 1949
- Running time: 55 minutes
- Country: United States
- Language: English

Roaring Westward is a 1949 American Western film directed by Oliver Drake and written by Ronald Davidson. The film stars Jimmy Wakely, Dub Taylor, Dennis Moore, Lois Hall, Jack Ingram and Claire Whitney. The film was released on September 15, 1949, by Monogram Pictures.

== Cast ==
- Jimmy Wakely as Jimmy Wakely
- Dub Taylor as Cannonball
- Dennis Moore as Sanders
- Lois Hall as Susan Braden
- Jack Ingram as Marshal Bill Braden
- Claire Whitney as Aunt Jessica Martin
- Marshall Reed as Matthews
- Kenne Duncan as Morgan
- Mike Ragan as Bart
- Buddy Swan as Perry Andrews
- Nolan Leary as Mossy Stevens
- Bud Osborne as Deputy Lafe Blake
