= The Artist at Work =

Short story by Albert Camus

- Short story by Albert Camus
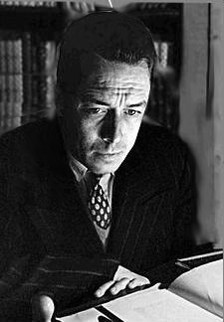
- Albert Camus
- Original title: Jonas, ou l'artiste au travail

Publication
- Published in: Exile and the Kingdom
- Publication date: 1957

"The Artist at Work" (Jonas, ou l'artiste au travail) is a short story by the French writer Albert Camus from Exile and the Kingdom (L'Exil et le royaume, 1957). It has been described as "a satirical commentary on Camus’ personal experience among the Paris intellectual elite of the 1940s and 1950s". The story addresses the question of one's relationship to the community, or more fundamentally the whole issue of existence. The epigraph, a verse from the Book of Jonah, and the name of the main character, "Jonas", set up a link to the prophet Jonah's interaction with people of the Bible.

== Synopsis ==
The story has a third-person narrative.

Gilbert Jonas is a child of divorce. His father owns a prestigious publishing company, but divorces his wife on the grounds of "adultery", in this case devoting herself entirely to helping the poor. Whatever happens to him, Jonas attributes his good fortune in life to his lucky "star." He becomes an artist, gains a patron, and shows his work at a good gallery. Within weeks, he finds himself besieged by hangers-on, advice seekers, fans, would-be lovers, new friends, and critics. There is also no shortage of other artists who offer their advice on how Jonas should proceed in his career.

Jonas moves his studio behind a curtain, then into the bedroom, then behind a curtain in the bedroom, then into the bathroom, and then finally onto a platform hoisted above a hallway where Jonas claims that he is at work on a canvas. But, because of the height and darkness of the hallway, no one can see the painting of a dog nor can they get him to come down for meals, which Jonas's wife, Louise, hoists up to him.

He stays there for weeks. Louise and Rateau (his devoted friend who is the only one who still visits) grow weary. Finally after becoming quite frail, Jonas decides he is finished painting. He hears the laughter of his daughter and wife, a sound he hasn't "heard" in quite some time. He reflects on their happiness and his love for his family, and faints.

Upon news from the doctor that he will be well soon, Camus tells us of Jonas's final work. A blank canvas with a word that can be made out "but without any certainty as to whether it should be read solitary or solidary". Another translation of the story uses the words "independent" or "interdependent". According to one critic, this signifies that his painting has turned to writing. In the original French:

Dans l’autre pièce, Rateau regardait la toile, entièrement blanche, au centre de laquelle Jonas avait seulement écrit, en très petits caractères, un mot qu’on pouvait déchiffrer, mais dont on ne savait s’il fallait y lire solitaire ou solidaire.
