= Scared Stiff (1945 film) =

1945 film by Frank McDonald

- Theatrical film poster
- Directed by: Frank McDonald
- Written by: Daniel Mainwaring; Maxwell Shane
- Produced by: William H. Pine (producer); William C. Thomas (producer); Maxwell Shane (associate producer)
- Starring: Jack Haley; Ann Savage; Barton MacLane
- Cinematography: Fred Jackman Jr.
- Edited by: Henry Adams
- Music by: Alexander Laszlo
- Production company: Pine-Thomas Productions
- Distributed by: Paramount Pictures
- Release date: June 22, 1945
- Running time: 65 minutes
- Country: United States
- Language: English

Scared Stiff (also known as Treasure of Fear (American television title) and You'll Be The Death Of Me Yet) is a 1945 American comedic murder mystery directed by Frank McDonald for Pine-Thomas Productions and released by Paramount Pictures. The film stars Jack Haley, Ann Savage and Barton MacLane.

== Plot ==
At his uncle's newspaper where Larry Elliot works as a reporter specializing in chess, he is known to miss out on bigger stories to cover more trivial events of minor interest. Confronted with an ultimatum if he wants to keep his job, Larry is assigned to cover a big harvest festival held at a winery in Grape City.

Larry begins with getting off the bus at the wrong stop, Grape Center instead of Grape City. He has brought along his girlfriend Sally Warren, who deals in antiques. Accidents rarely come alone, and the man sitting next to Larry on the bus is found murdered, holding a chess piece in his hand when the police find him. Larry, who is a chess expert, is blamed for the killing.

All the bus passengers are held in custody at Grape Center awaiting the sheriff to start the murder investigation. Before he arrives, Sally finds a set of antique chess pieces she wants to acquire, and involves Larry in her quest to buy them. The set is said to have been the property of Kublai Khan in the 13th century, and brought to the West by Marco Polo. Unfortunately, the set is divided between Charles and Preston Waldeck, twins owning the winery, who have not spoken to each other in 10 years.

Sally manages to acquire the white set pieces from Preston. When Larry is about to get the black pieces from Charles, both he and Charles are knocked out by an unknown attacker, who also steals the black set pieces.

The sheriff arrives, and starts conducting his investigation. The prime suspect is convicted murderer Deacon Markham, who first sold the antique chess set to the Waldeck brothers, after stealing it from its rightful owner. The theory is that Markham now wants the set back to sell it back to the first owner and get the money he needs to escape the country.

Markham reveals himself when holding Larry at gunpoint in his hotel room to get the white pieces from the set. Markham and his accomplice Mink hide when Sally enters the room, telling Larry she hid the pieces in his room. Soon after, another guest, Flo Rosson, also enters the room and reveals that she is an insurance agent tracking Markham's gang to retrieve the chess set. She also reveals that the man killed on the bus was part of this gang of thieves.

Also at the inn is Preston's grandson, Oliver Waldeck, a precocious boy genius, and his mentor, Professor Wisner. Oliver frightens Larry with scary antics, including a pronouncement that the corpse's head was chopped off, placing a cabbage adorned by a toupee in Larry's room. Oliver throws a smoke bomb into the room, and everyone is forced out into the corridor. In the ensuing commotion, the white pieces are stolen.

Snooping about the winery, Larry manages to find the black set, but is knocked unconscious in the wine cellar. When she finds the other part of the set, Sally is also knocked out by Oliver's tutor, Professor Wisner. Larry wakes up, unties himself and goes after the killer, who turns out to be Professor Wisner, and ultimately finds the dead body.

After Sally has found the complete set, the insurance adjuster Flo offers her a $1,000 reward for retrieving it. Larry phones his editor, explaining the events at Grape Center and how he caught the murderer. He then asks his editor if he should continue to the festival at Grape City or come back and get fired.

== Cast ==
- Jack Haley as Larry Elliot
- Ann Savage as Sally Warren
- Barton MacLane as George "Deacon" Markham
- Veda Ann Borg as Flo Rosson
- Roger Pryor as Richardson
- George E. Stone as Mink
- Robert Emmett Keane as Prof. Wisner
- Lucien Littlefield as Charles Waldeck / Preston Waldeck
- Paul Hurst as Sheriff
- Arthur Aylesworth as Emerson Cooke
- Eily Malyon as Mrs. Cooke
- Buddy Swan as Oliver Waldeck

== Production ==
Principal photography under the working title of You'll Be the Death of Me Yet on the production began in early November 1944.

Jack Haley had been signed to a multi-picture contract with Pine-Thomas in 1944. Pine-Thomas were so pleased with Ann Savage that they signed her to a three-film contract.

== Reception ==
As with other Pine-Thomas Productions, Scared Stiff was released as a B-movie with low production values. Ann Savage's biographers Lisa Morton and Kent Adamson relegated Scared Stiff to merely "lackluster" and "forgettable".

The production team of William H. Pine and William C. Thomas, known in the industry as the "Two Dollar Bills", reissued the film as Treasure of Fear, as part of a package of 30 of their films for television in 1955. By that time Paramount had used the title Scared Stiff for the Martin and Lewis 1953 film of the same title.

Due to copyright problems, Scared Stiff fell into public domain; recently it was released in Mill Creek's Fabulous Forties box set.
