= Counterspy Meets Scotland Yard =

1950 film directed by Seymour Friedman

- Directed by: Seymour Friedman
- Written by: Harold Greene
- Based on: Radio series Counterspy by Phillips Lord
- Produced by: Wallace MacDonald
- Starring: Howard St. John; Amanda Blake; Ron Randell; June Vincent
- Cinematography: Philip Tannura
- Edited by: Aaron Stell
- Music by: Mischa Bakaleinikoff
- Production company: Columbia Pictures
- Distributed by: Columbia Pictures
- Release date: November 21, 1950
- Running time: 67 minutes
- Country: United States
- Language: English

Counterspy Meets Scotland Yard is a 1950 American film noir B movie directed by Seymour Friedman and starring Howard St. John, Ron Randell and Amanda Blake.

It was the second of two film adaptations based on the radio series Counterspy (1942–57) created by Phillips H. Lord., starring Howard St. John as David Harding. The first had been David Harding, Counterspy (1950).

== Plot ==
When enemy agents obtain leaked secrets about a guided missile system, American spy David Harding and British investigator Simon Langton work together to find the source.

== Cast ==
- Howard St. John as David Harding
- Amanda Blake as Karen Michele
- Ron Randell as Simon Langton
- June Vincent as Barbara Taylor
- Fred F. Sears as Peters
- John Dehner as Robert Reynolds
- Lewis Martin as Dr. Victor Gilbert, also known as Hugo Boren
- Rick Vallin as McCullough
- Jimmy Lloyd as Burton
- Ted Jordan as Brown
- Gregory Gay as Professor Schuman
- Douglas Evans as Colonel Kilgore
- John Doucette as Larry, a thug
- Don Brodie as Jimmy, a thug

== Production ==
The film's working title was David Harding, Counterspy.

== Reception ==
Variety wrote: "Most of the large cast play their roles broadly with a hint that hey’re enjoying the excursion into make-believe ... Seymour Friedman directed at a fast clip. Camerawork of Philip Tannura was good, especially in the action sequences, while producer Wallace MacDonald squeezed ample values out of his low budget."
