= The WAC from Walla Walla =

1952 film by William Witney

- Theatrical release poster
- Directed by: William Witney
- Screenplay by: Arthur T. Horman
- Produced by: Sidney Picker
- Starring: Judy Canova; Stephen Dunne; George Cleveland; June Vincent; Irene Ryan; Roy Barcroft
- Cinematography: Jack A. Marta
- Edited by: Tony Martinelli
- Music by: R. Dale Butts
- Production company: Republic Pictures
- Distributed by: Republic Pictures
- Release date: October 10, 1952
- Running time: 83 minutes
- Country: United States
- Language: English
- Budget: $265,064
- Box office: 440,074

The WAC from Walla Walla is a 1952 American comedy film directed by William Witney and written by Arthur T. Horman. The film stars Judy Canova, Stephen Dunne, George Cleveland, June Vincent, Irene Ryan and Roy Barcroft. The film was released on October 10, 1952, by Republic Pictures.

== Plot ==
Two families in a small town, the Canovas and the Mayfields are perpetually feuding. Each family prides themselves on their military tradition, with the Canovas having a statue of an ancestor who fought in the American Civil War holding a pride of place in the town with the Mayfields trying to replace it with one of their own Mayfield ancestors.

A Romeo and Juliet situation develops where Judy Canova is in love with Lieutenant Tom Mayfield of the Army Ordnance Corps, but Tom pays more attention to the glamorous Doris Vail. Vail tricks Judy into joining the Women's Army Corps to get rid of her. The joke is on Doris when Tom is enthralled with Judy's patriotism and accompanies her on the town hayride. When Doris finds out Judy will be sent to basic training at the same army post Tom is at, Doris enlists herself.

Following basic training, the pair get assigned to Tom's Ordnance unit that is testing a secret missile guidance device that attracts the attention of an enemy spy ring.

== Cast ==
- Judy Canova as Judy Canova
- Stephen Dunne as Lieutenant Tom Mayfield
- George Cleveland as Gramps Canova
- June Vincent as Doris Vail
- Irene Ryan as Women's Army Corps Sergeant Kearns
- Roy Barcroft as Mr. Prentiss
- Allen Jenkins as Mr. Redington
- George Chandler as Jud Canova
- Elizabeth Slifer as Betty Canova
- Thurston Hall as Colonel Mayfield
- Ellanora Needles as Recruiting Sergeant
- Dick Wessel as Sergeant Malone
- Pattie Chapman as Lizzie

== Reception ==
After distribution, advertising and prints the film recorded a loss of $41,507.
