= Exile and the Kingdom =

Collection of short stories by Albert Camus

- Author: Albert Camus
- Original title: L'exil et le royaume
- Translator: Justin O'Brien
- Cover artist: Paul Rand
- Language: French
- Genre: Short stories
- Publisher: Henry Holt & Company
- Publication date: 1957
- Publication place: France
- Pages: 213
- ISBN: 978-0679733850

Exile and the Kingdom (French: L'Exil et le Royaume) is a 1957 collection of six short stories by French writer Albert Camus. First published in French, in translation, it was not well received by contemporary English critics. The underlying theme of these stories is human loneliness and feeling foreign and isolated in one's own society. Camus writes about outsiders living in Algeria who straddle the divide between the Muslim world and France.

== Stories ==
These works of fiction cover the whole variety of existentialism, or absurdism, as Camus himself insisted his philosophical ideas be called. The clearest manifestation of the ideals of Camus can be found in the story "La Pierre qui pousse." This story features D'Arrast, who can be seen as a positive hero as opposed to Meursault in The Stranger. He actively shapes his life and sacrifices himself in order to help a friend, instead of remaining passive. The moral quality of his actions is intensified by the fact that D'Arrast has deep insight into the absurdity of the world but acts morally nevertheless (not unlike the main character in The Plague). In the Silent Men, Camus reveals his understanding of the life of lower class laborers. The main character, Yvars, is a barrel maker, like Camus's uncle, for whom he worked as a teenager.

The six works collected in this volume are:

- "The Adulterous Woman" ("La Femme adultère")
- "The Renegade or a Confused Spirit" ("Le Renégat ou un esprit confus")
- "The Silent Men" ("Les Muets")
- "The Guest" ("L'Hôte")
- "Jonas or the Artist at Work" ("Jonas ou l’artiste au travail")
- "The Growing Stone" ("La Pierre qui pousse")
