= The Silent Men =

Short story

"The Silent Men" (French: Les muets) is a short story written in 1957. It is the third short story published in the volume Exile and the Kingdom by Albert Camus.

== Plot summary ==
The silent men are the workers at a cooper's shop during the war in Algeria. They have recently returned to work after a failed strike. When the owner's daughter has a serious, acute illness requiring an ambulance, the men do not offer any words of condolence. Where once there had been a sense of being all part of a whole, they no longer feel such for the owner who had refused to acquiesce to their demands following their strike. The owner himself is not a bad person; it is stated that he treated his men well, even offering each man five bottles of vintage wine each new year. The owner even tried to reconcile with the men, saying that if they are to increase productivity and thus bring in more revenue he will not only increase their salaries but he will do so without being prompted. Nevertheless, the men are cold, and when the owner says goodbye to everyone at the end of the day, nobody reacts. The men themselves have preserved their own sense of fraternity, however, and despite the situation with the owner and his daughter, the men are warm and humane to each other. While as a whole the men seem morally unaffected by the situation, Yvars, the protagonist, can't stop thinking about the little girl. At the end of the story, Yvars breaks his silence and confides in his wife all that has happened in the course of the day, and concludes by uttering "Ah! it's his own fault!"

== Motifs ==
=== The common fate ===
A common theme in the works of Camus is that death is the common fate of all. From the rich to the poor, privileged to the destitute, the guilty to the innocent, the old and sometimes the young. Death is inescapable and makes all equal in the end. Just like Father Paneloux and the plague-stricken young boy in Camus' The Plague, death belittles our other problems and emphasizes man's struggle to make sense of what he has.

=== The silence ===
The owner treated the men well, but he stood firm during the strike. He told them to take it or leave it, and that his offer of work is a charity. When they were back to work, the doors were closed until all of them arrived, as he was emphasizing he had the upper hand. It is explained "that they were not sulking, that their mouths had been closed, they had to take it or leave it, and that anger and helplessness sometimes hurt so much that you can't even cry out." (Camus 406)
