= David Harding, Counterspy =

1950 film by Ray Nazarro

- Directed by: Ray Nazarro
- Written by: Phillips Lord (radio program) (as Phillips H. Lord)
- Screenplay by: Clint Johnston; Tom Reed
- Story by: Clint Johnston; Tom Reed
- Produced by: Milton Feldman
- Starring: Willard Parker
- Cinematography: George E. Diskant
- Edited by: Henry Batista
- Production company: Columbia Pictures
- Distributed by: Columbia Pictures
- Release date: May 20, 1950 (Los Angeles)
- Running time: 71 minutes
- Country: United States
- Language: English

David Harding, Counterspy is a 1950 American crime film noir directed by Ray Nazarro and starring Willard Parker, based on the radio series Counterspy.

Howard St. John reprised his role as David Harding in Counterspy Meets Scotland Yard (1950).

== Plot ==
An American spy is killed under suspicious circumstances in the United States during World War II. His friend Jerry Baldwin, a naval commander, is assigned to replace him and stop a saboteur at a torpedo factory, building them for the United States Navy. The story is told in a flashback story to illustrate how counter-espionage works.

== Cast ==
- Willard Parker as Lt. Comdr. Jerry A. Baldwin
- Audrey Long as Betty Iverson
- Raymond Greenleaf as Dr. George Vickers
- Harlan Warde as Hopkins
- Alex Gerry as Charles Kingston
- Howard St. John as David Harding
