= Howard St. John =

American actor (1905–1974)

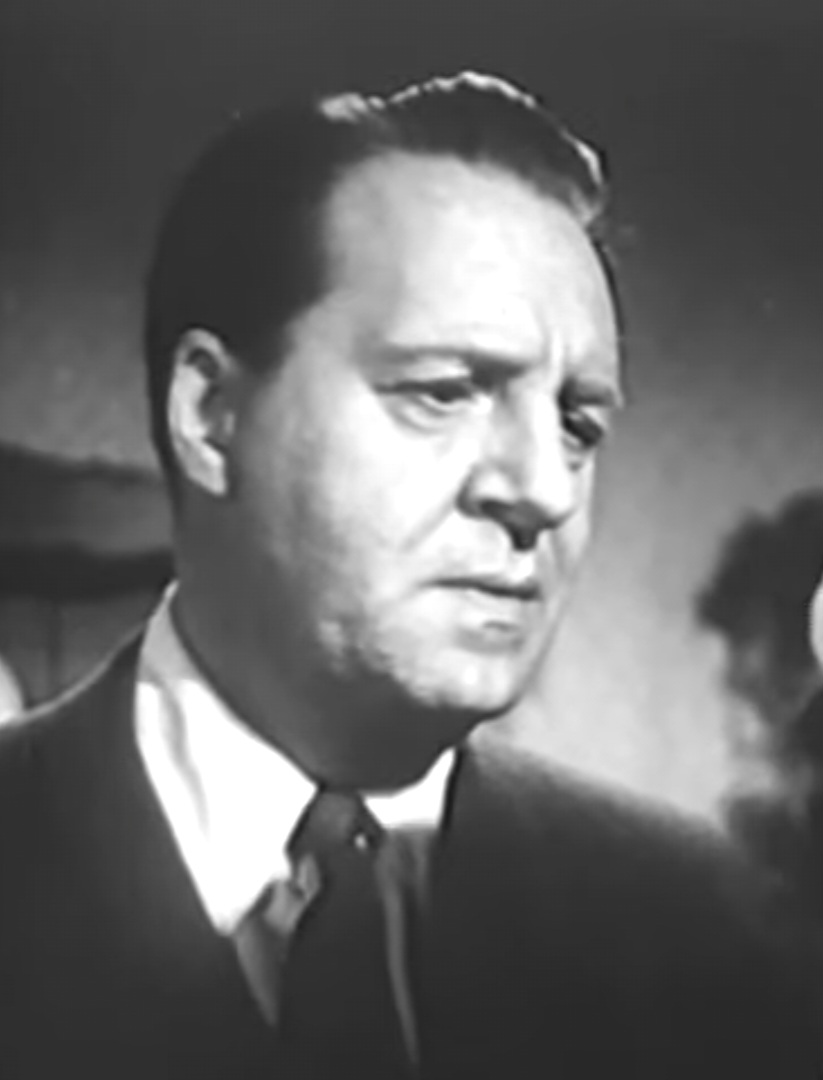
- St. John in The Sun Sets at Dawn (1951)
- Born: October 9, 1905; Chicago, Illinois, U.S.
- Died: March 13, 1974 (aged 68); New York City, U.S.
- Occupation: Actor
- Years active: 1926–1972
- Spouse: Lois Bolton (m. 1939)

Howard St. John (October 9, 1905 – March 13, 1974) was a Chicago-born character actor who specialized in unsympathetic roles. His work spanned Broadway, film and television. Among his best-remembered roles are the bombastic General Bullmoose in the stage and screen versions of the 1956 musical Li'l Abner, and his supporting roles in the classic comedies Born Yesterday (1950) and One, Two, Three (1961).

== Early years ==
St. John was born in Chicago and grew up in several Canadian cities. When he was a boy, his main interest lay in sports. His participation in football and hockey led to his breaking his nose three times.

St. John toured Canada as a boy singer, and he was a newspaperman and a stockbroker.

== Stage ==
St. John made his Broadway debut portraying James Manton in The Blonde Sinner (1926), and subsequently appeared in more than 20 Broadway productions including Someone Waiting and The Highest Tree.

St. John's most high-profile role was that of General Bullmoose in the hit musical Li'l Abner. As Bullmoose he introduced the song "Progress is the Root of All Evil." His final Broadway role came in 1968's Tiger at the Gates.

== Film ==
St. John began film work in the early 1930s and made an impression in Alfred Hitchcock's Strangers on a Train in 1951. He continued in stuffy, rigid or authoritarian roles for most of his career, including memorable ones in The Tender Trap and Born Yesterday. He also re-created his stage role in the film version of Li'l Abner.

St. John had the title role in the film David Harding, Counterspy and continued in the role in the sequel Counterspy Meets Scotland Yard (1950).

== Television ==
St. John portrayed Lloyd Prior on the NBC crime drama The Investigator (1958).

== Death ==
St. John died of a heart attack in New York City at age 68 in 1974.

== Partial filmography ==
- Shockproof (1949) - Sam Brooks
- The Undercover Man (1949) - Joseph S. Horan
- Customs Agent (1950) - Charles Johnson
- 711 Ocean Drive (1950) - Lt. Pete Wright
- David Harding, Counterspy (1950) - David Harding
- The Men (1950) - Ellen's Father
- Mister 880 (1950) - Chief
- The Sun Sets at Dawn (1950) - The Warden
- Counterspy Meets Scotland Yard (1950) - Counterspy David Harding
- Born Yesterday (1950) - Jim Devery
- Goodbye, My Fancy (1951) - Claude Griswold
- Strangers on a Train (1951) - Police Capt. Turley
- Saturday's Hero (1951) - Belfrage
- Close to My Heart (1951) - I.O. Frost
- The Big Night (1951) - Al Judge
- Starlift (1951) - Steve Rogers
- Stop, You're Killing Me (1952) - Commissioner Mahoney
- Three Coins in the Fountain (1954) - Burgoyne
- Illegal (1955) - E.A. Smith
- The Tender Trap (1955) - Mr. Sayers
- I Died a Thousand Times (1955) - Doc Banton
- World in My Corner (1956) - Harry Cram
- Li'l Abner (1959) - General Bullmoose
- Cry for Happy (1961) - Vice Adm. Junius B. Bennett
- Sanctuary (1961) - Governor Drake
- Madison Avenue (1961) - J.D. Jocelyn
- One, Two, Three (1961) - Wendell P. Hazeltine
- Lover Come Back (1961) - Mr. John Brackett
- La Fayette (1961) - George Washington
- Madison Avenue (1962) - J.D. Jocelyn
- Strait-Jacket (1964) - Raymond Fields
- Fate Is the Hunter (1964) - Mark Hutchins
- Quick, Before It Melts (1964) - Harvey T. Sweigert
- Sex and the Single Girl (1964) - Randall
- Strange Bedfellows (1965) - Julius L. Stevens
- Banning (1967) - J. Pallister Young
- Matchless (1967) - General Shapiro
- Don't Drink the Water (1969) - Ambassador Magee
