= Lung Kong =

Lung Kong may refer to:

- Longgang, Shenzhen, a district in China
- Patrick Lung (1934–2014), also known as Lung Kong, a Hong Kong film director
