= Paranoid fiction =

Genre of fiction

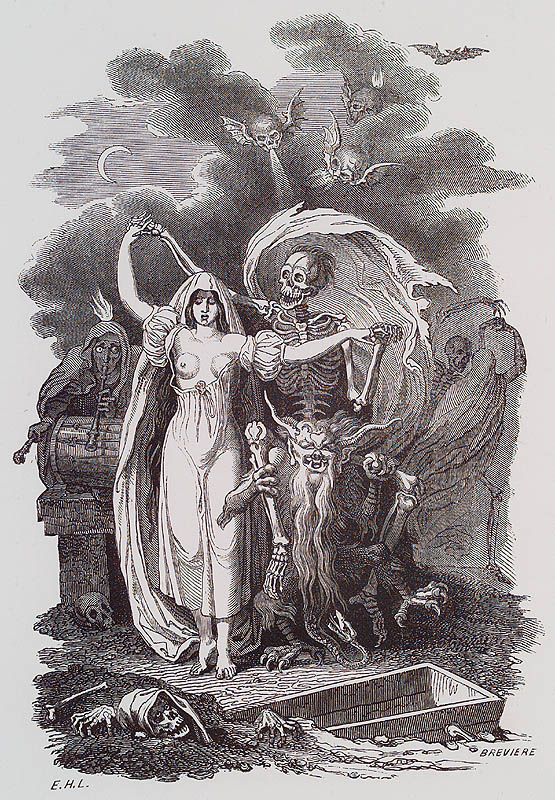
Seductive Death, an illustration depicting paranoid fiction by E.H.Langlois

Paranoid fiction is a work of literature that explores the subjective nature of reality and how it can be manipulated by forces in power. These forces can be external, such as a totalitarian government, or they can be internal, such as a character's mental illness or refusal to accept the harshness of the world they are in.

== History ==
The elements of paranoid fiction can be seen in works dating as far back as the late 19th and early 20th century. Some of Fyodor Dostoyevsky's novels contained paranoid and psychologically troubled characters set against the dark backdrop of a modernizing Russia. Franz Kafka was known for his exaggerated accounts of what he portrayed as real life in his works, to enhance the absurdity of the life themes they conveyed. Similarly, George Orwell's works, while not as exaggerated, confirmed the practice of using dystopian fiction to take a different outlook on highly common themes, including identity and personal desires.

The term paranoid fiction was first coined to label sensationalistic and off-beat stories as bizarre and thus outside the realm of literary fiction. Starting after World War I, however, modernists began exploring the stranger themes of life in art, in response to the themes of death being effectively mechanized and made impossible to toy with by the war's graphic depictions. As a result, modernist literature tended to explore the meaning and construction of reality, shifting away from the progressive, cause-and-effect structure of realist fiction towards a more complex and disjointed depiction of reality.

After World War II, absurdists carried this focus one step further by placing these common themes in surreal and fantastic settings, turning what would have been otherwise mundane concepts into distinctive, stand-out ones, thus converting the paranoid fiction genre into a legitimate one.

Philip K. Dick is most frequently viewed as the forefather of the modern paranoid fiction. His works were born out of paranoia and hallucination; he had sudden visions of places he'd never been to and events he'd never witnessed, possibly from temporal lobe epilepsy or an active imagination. These visions were so vivid that Dick put them down on paper, never failing to classify them as only "speculative thought," and thus outside the boundary of conventional thought.

Most of Dick's works start out uneventfully in a seemingly ordinary setting, then transpose to a surrealistic fantasy, with the characters discovering that what they thought real was in fact a delusion. Throughout his works, Dick maintained a balance between the expected traits of the science fiction genre they were also categorized in, and the eccentric and disturbing elements coming from his mind. A recurring theme in his works is on how reality is perceived and treated differently by people depending on their mindsets.

== Characteristics ==
At its most basic, paranoid fiction refers specifically to works about speculations and possible conspiracies by people in power, told by an unreliable narrator. However, the most popular type of paranoid fiction has proved to be one in which the universe appears on the surface to be definite and real, but upon closer inspection, to actually be deceptive and deliberately misleading. In these works, there are either questions raised as to the realness of the world the characters are living in, or a distinction made between a fantasy world and its reality.

Paranoid fiction often overlaps with many other genres, most commonly dystopian fiction, science fiction, and film noir, sharing many of its main themes and literary devices. Generally, however, paranoid fiction avoids explicitly defined themes and concrete motifs in favor of allegories and ambiguous symbolism to emphasize the dreamlike and unreal nature of the characters' world. For example, a purely dystopian work typically explores the mechanisms and motives of the totalitarian state to keep its people under control, whereas one of paranoid fiction would concentrate more on the effects of the state on its inhabitants' mental and emotional well-being, and its implications on the decadent condition of society. George Orwell's Nineteen Eighty-Four can be viewed as a balance of the two, depicting the Party as crushing free will through a strictly defined language and constant monitoring, but also through psychological torture and the distorting of people's viewpoints on what is true and what is false.

To further increase their "magic realism," works of paranoid fiction often employ common devices and archetypes from other genres, including a detective-solving structure, plot twists, or philosophical themes, to create a surrealistic tone and an atmosphere of fear and dread. Plots also tend to be fanciful and occasionally futuristic to emphasize their inherent absurdity and imaginativeness, but also maintain some measure of realism to comment on how apparently unrealistic stories can, in fact, be (often frighteningly) closer to real life than one might think at first glance.

Sometimes paranoid fiction will strongly imply, and occasionally admit outright, that its constructed world is a lie or an illusion. In this case, the plot will center on the main character's struggle between the physical and spiritual; i.e. the actual world they are in, versus the world they want to see and believe in. Here, the cause of the fantasy is the protagonist's internal desires, doubts, and suspicions. Such works tend to be more introspective and focused on the individual, than on a community or a regime.

== Authors ==
- Iain Banks
- Samuel Beckett
- William S. Burroughs
- Philip K. Dick
- Stephen R. Donaldson
- Fyodor Dostoevsky
- Knut Hamsun
- Franz Kafka
- James Kelman
- Catherine Lacey
- Stanisław Lem
- H. P. Lovecraft
- Dimitris Lyacos
- Ottessa Moshfegh
- Ryū Murakami
- George Orwell
- Chuck Palahniuk
- Thomas Pynchon
- Ishmael Reed
- Matt Ruff
- Ryukishi07
- Jean-Paul Sartre
- Trevor Shane
- Strugatsky brothers
- Hunter S. Thompson
- Jim Thompson
- Kurt Vonnegut
- Robert Anton Wilson

== Films ==
- 12 Monkeys
- After Hours
- American Psycho
- Angel Heart
- A Beautiful Mind
- Brazil
- The Butterfly Effect
- The Devil's Advocate
- Donnie Darko
- Carnival of Souls
- Eraserhead
- Fight Club
- Friend of the World
- The Game
- Jacob's Ladder
- Klute
- Lost Highway
- The Manchurian Candidate
- The Matrix
- Melvin Goes to Dinner
- Memento
- Mulholland Drive
- Naked Lunch
- Phantasm
- Pi
- Primer
- The Prisoner
- The Machinist
- A Scanner Darkly
- Shutter Island
- The Parallax View
- The Sixth Sense
- The Truman Show
- Slaughterhouse-Five
- Somewhere in Time
- Southland Tales
- Taxi Driver
- They Live
- Total Recall
- Vanilla Sky
- Videodrome

== See also ==
- Biopunk
- Conspiracy fiction
- Dystopian
- Pandemics in fiction
