= The State of Siege =

1948 play by Albert Camus

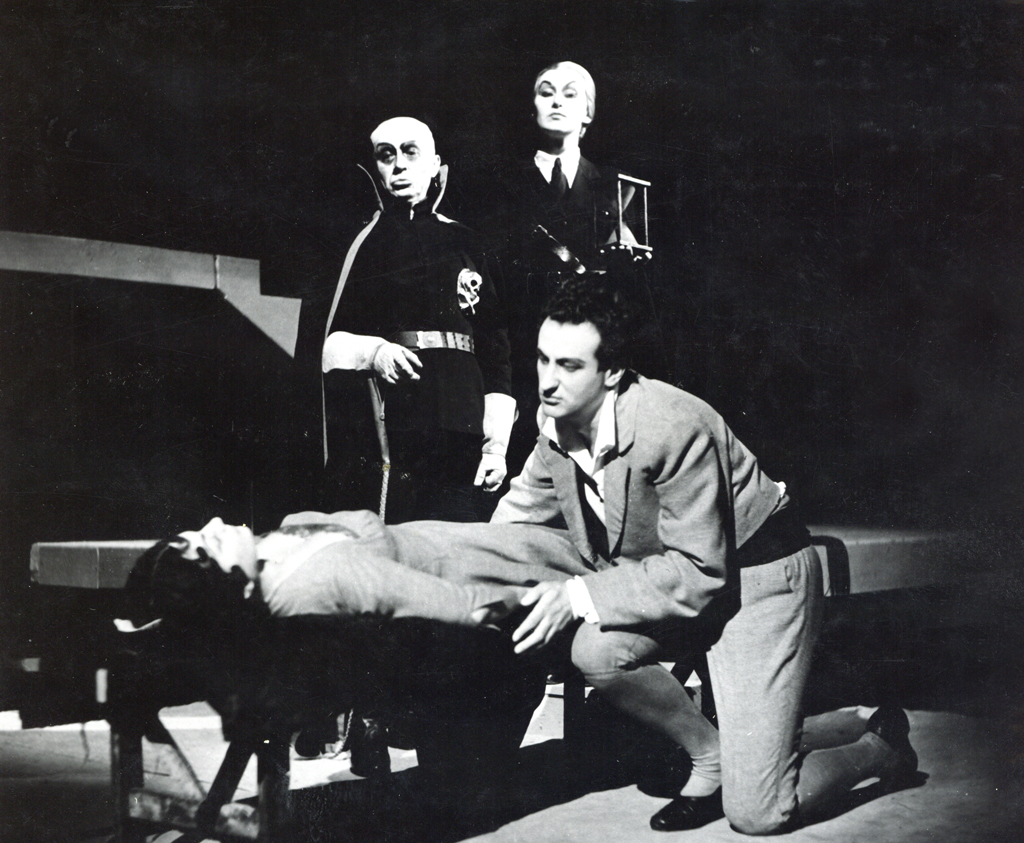
- The State of Siege performed at the Maribor Slovene National Theatre (1955)
- Original title: L'État de Siège
- Original language: French
- Written by: Albert Camus
- Music by: Arthur Honegger
- Chorus: The Fisherman (Note: As the corypheus)
- Genre: Drama
- Setting: Cádiz, Spain

Premiere
- Date: 27 October 1948
- Place: Théâtre Marigny (Paris)
- Directed by: Jean-Louis Barrault

The State of Siege (French: L'État de Siège), (Note: French pronunciation: [l‿e.ta də sjɛʒ]. It is sometimes spelled with a lowercase (siège) or without the accent grave (siege).) sometimes translated as State of Emergency, is a 1948 drama by the French philosopher Albert Camus. The play centers around the Spanish city of Cádiz during an outbreak of the bubonic plague. The plague itself is personified as a dictatorial non-commissioned officer who, along with his secretary and several collaborationists, implements martial law and enforces a confusing but rigid bureaucracy on the city.

The play began as an informal collaboration between Camus and Jean-Louis Barrault. Barrault had originally planned to write a plague myth and later aimed to base the work on Daniel Defoe's A Journal of the Plague Year. He then reached out to Camus to write the dialogue after the success of his novel The Plague the year prior. The two then agreed to aim the topic of the play toward a more contemporary audience, though Defoe's work is considered the most influential source of inspiration. Camus departed from his expected Greek tragedy–like style to develop something more akin to a morality play or auto sacramental, inspired by their ability to disseminate Catholic theology across medieval Europe.

Despite a prestigious cast and Camus's previous success, The State of Siege was a complete failure critically and commercially, with production ending only a few weeks after the premiere. Critics remarked that its characterization was one-dimensional, its practical effects and stage design overly stylized, and its action clumsy. Several opined that Camus might have been strong-armed by Barrault's forceful personality into writing something contrary to his style, especially given Camus's previous success. Camus, however, took full credit for the play and its failure, later remarking that "few plays have had the pleasure of being so thoroughly savaged". Modern retrospectives have had more mixed reviews, though they remain overall negative. It has been criticized for its heavy-handed symbolism and being contrary to the literary and theoretical inspiration on which it was based, though others have applauded it as experimental or at least ambitious.

== Background ==
=== Author ===
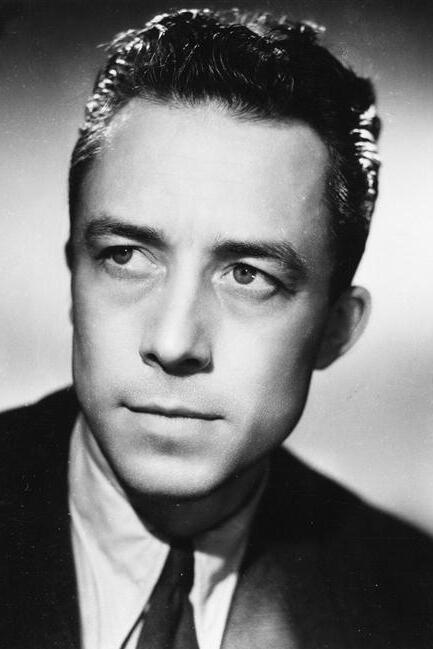
Camus in 1945

Albert Camus was a French writer and philosopher, best known for his propounding of absurdism. He was born into poverty in French Algeria in 1913 to a Spanish mother and a French father with longstanding pied-noir roots in Algeria who died in World War I the year after Camus's birth. During the Nazi occupation of France, Camus served as part of the French Resistance and became entrenched in its underground paper Combat. Following the war, he was awarded the 1957 Nobel Prize in Literature, its second-youngest honorand after Rudyard Kipling. Camus died in an automobile accident in southern France in 1960.

As outlined in his extended essay The Myth of Sisyphus, Camus argued that life was absurd in that it is inscrutable and impossible to rationalize. When people realize this fact, they either commit suicide or take a leap of faith into religion, which Camus termed "philosophical suicide". Instead, he argued that people should "revolt against the absurd"; in other words, they should reject both kinds of suicide and separate the meaninglessness in the universe from the idea that life itself was without meaning.

=== The play ===
Although Camus was credited as the sole author, the effort began as something of a collaboration between him and Jean-Louis Barrault. Barrault began working on a play in May 1942 and went through several titular variations before settling on Le Mal des ardents. (Note: Literally 'the illness of those aflame', referring to ergotism, as poisoning victims often describe feeling as if they have been set on fire. Other working titles included The Purifying Evil, The Plague, The Tragedy of the Plague, The Purifying Tragedy of the Plague, and The Evil.) He had originally planned to dramatize a plague myth, but after a few years, he settled on using the English author Daniel Defoe's 1722 novel A Journal of the Plague Year as a general framing piece for the writing process.

When Barrault heard that Camus had published his novel The Plague on a similar topic, Barrault invited Camus to write the dialogue for the play. At this point, Barrault had already written the entire first act and had prepared a framework for the rest of the play. The two ultimately agreed to depart from the idea of adapting Defoe's work and write something more pertinent for their contemporary audience. Camus later recounted to a journalist that the play went through at least seven variations before it premiered. Still, Camus used Defoe's work as The State of Siege's main source of inspiration, though Camus and Barrault were also particularly inspired by the works of Antonin Artaud, particularly his Théâtre et son double collection of essays. (Note: Nancey-Quentin de Gromard (2013) notes that both were also influenced by Friedrich Nietzsche, particularly his The Birth of Tragedy, though Camus began publicly disavowing Nietzsche's philosophy in 1942.)

Like Barrault's original script, the final draft went through several title changes before The State of Siege was finally chosen. In order to pick a name, one told the other "Get dressed, darling, we're going to see [...]" wherein the other would respond with one of the titles. The original working title was Love of Life, followed by The Inquisition at Cadiz, then shortened to The Inquisition. Alternative titles included The Grand Inquisitors, The Scourge, The Rising Wind, and Us and Them.

== Plot ==
the first alcalde
(having trouble deciphering the words )

Reasons for being?

the fisherman

On my mother's grave, I swear I don't understand a word of whatever language it is you're speaking.

the secretary

The form's asking you to give your reasons for being alive.

the fisherman

Reasons! What sorts of reasons would you have me give?

the secretary

You see! Note that down clearly, Mister First Alcalde—the undersigned acknowledges that his existence is unjustifiable.

Le premier alcade
(déchiffrant péniblement )

Raison d'être?

Le pêcheur
Que ma mère soit mordue à l'endroit du péché si je comprends quelque chose à ce patois.
La secrétaire
Cela signifie qu'il faut donner les raisons que vous avez d'être en vie.
Le pêcheur
Les raisons! Quelles raisons voulez-vous que je trouve?
La secrétaire
Vous voyez! Notez-le bien, monsieur le premier alcade, le soussigné reconnaît que son existence est injustifiable.

— Act II

A comet dashes through the sky and the citizens of Cádiz gathered at the city walls believe it to be a bad omen. The local drunk Nada (Note: Spanish for 'nothing') proclaims that nothing serious will happen. The municipal government announces that the city will proceed as usual and references to the comet will meet with punishment. Diego, a medical student, and his fiancée Victoria are star-crossed lovers and flirt outside her window; Victoria's father Casado, (Note: Spanish for 'married' or 'a married man') a local judge, disapproves of their engagement. During a performance in the city square, an actor collapses dead of plague and the city erupts in a panic.

As the governor addresses the citizenry, a man dressed as a non-commissioned officer enters unexpectedly with his secretary. The man announces that he is the Plague itself and demands control of the local government. The governor scoffs and sends a guard to arrest him. The man tells his secretary to cross off the guard's name from her book and the guard drops dead. The governor relinquishes control and the alcaldes quickly acquiesce to the new administration. The Plague and his secretary institute a dictatorship, demanding that all citizens resist helping plague victims, mark their doors with a particular sign, and stuff their mouths with vinegar-soaked rags. After discovering his nihilistic outlook, the secretary eagerly enlists Nada as a bureaucrat, who accepts the position with great enthusiasm. He integrates the townsfolk into the new byzantine bureaucracy to their great confusion and dismay.

Diego aids the sick, but becomes infected himself. Casado threatens to turn Diego in to save the family and Diego grabs the youngest son, threatening to infect the boy if Casado turns him in. Casado is unmoved and reveals the boy is his wife's illegitimate son. Diego leaves and tries to escape to an offshore quarantine, but is foiled by the secretary, who expresses fondness for him. In a rage, he throttles her, which causes his buboes to recede and prompts the secretary to hint that rebellion stifles the Plague's administration. Diego goes to the town and convinces some of the townsfolk to rebel, leading to a crackdown. In the ensuing mêlée, a rebel snatches the notebook from the secretary and the crowd rejoices. Casado's other daughter grabs it and strikes the name of a family member and the people begin to call for the deaths of some fellow citizens.

Victoria is brought out on a stretcher, ill but alive. Diego requests the Plague spare Victoria in exchange for his life. Based on an archaic rule of his code, the Plague rejoins with an offer to spare the couple if he may continue running the city. Diego states that his choosing death is his own choice and thus the citizenry ought to be left alone. The Plague relents and tortures Diego to death with the pestilence, during which Victoria wails with grief and the secretary admits pity for the townsfolk. The Plague and his secretary leave the city and the original administration returns. In a fit of rage, Nada throws himself from the city walls into the sea. A widowed fisherman castigates him and remarks that the sea has avenged the city.

== Cast and design ==
The play's cast was a collaboration between some of the most prestigious names in French theater. Barrault served as director and starred as Diego opposite Maria Casarès as Victoria. The Plague and the secretary were played by Pierre Bertin and Barrault's wife Madeleine Renaud, respectively, while Nada was played by Pierre Brasseur. Minor roles were also cast with relatively big names, including Marcel Marceau as "the transporter of the dead" (le convoyeur des morts), and both Jean Desailly and his wife Ginette played unnamed members of the citizenry.

The State of Siege's music was composed by the Swiss musician Arthur Honegger, while the Polish-French artist Balthus served as the production's set and costume designer. Balthus developed an apocalyptic style for the play's design with the second act transitioning the city to resemble a Spanish-style bullfighting ring, staging the dispute between Diego and Victoria as the "bullfight". Camus and Barrault originally disagreed on the costuming design for the Plague character. While Camus wanted to be forthright about the relationship of the character to totalitarianism, Barrault sought to emulate the more subtle Artaudian style, envisioning the Plague as a "totemic" figure garbed in green and yellow scarabs.

== Reception ==
=== Contemporary ===
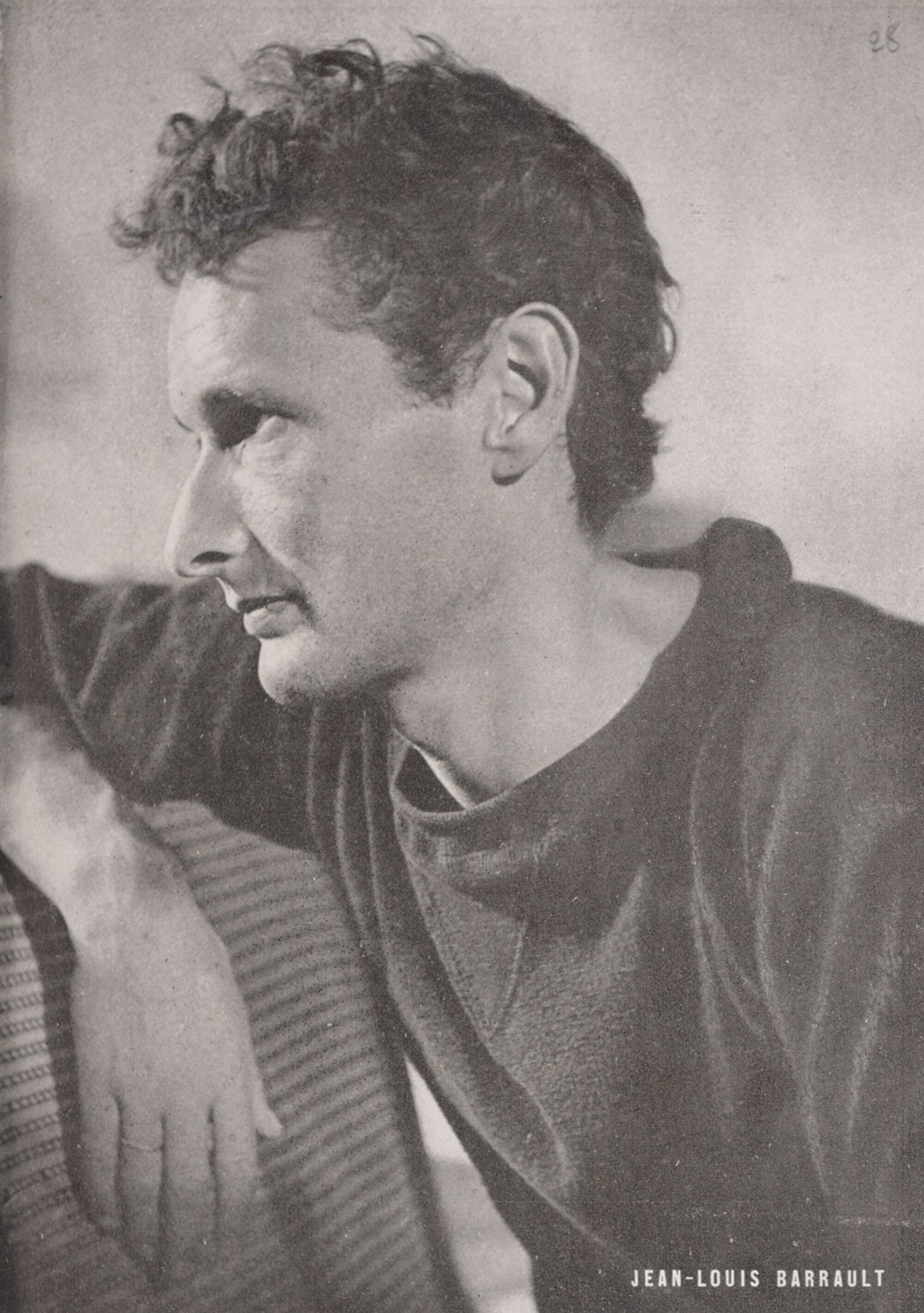
Several critics suggested that the production's director and lead actor Jean-Louis Barrault may have led to the play's overall failure.

The State of Siege premiered on 27 October 1948 at the Théâtre Marigny in the eighth arrondissement of Paris. During its run, The State of Siege was universally panned by critics and a commercial failure. Though there was a consensus that Camus achieved expressing the importance of revolt and even garnered sympathy for it, critics were unimpressed with the one-dimensionality of its characters, its overly stylized practical effects and stage design, and its clumsy action. The play was only performed for a few weeks before production closed. Camus thought closing production too early had been a rash decision, but Barrault argued that the monetary cost of keeping the play going was too high for the remote hope that the situation would improve. Camus himself described the effort as a total failure, remarking that "few plays have had the pleasure of being so thoroughly savaged". He later joked: "Naturally, I prefer that my plays be successful. But I also find a number of subtle satisfactions in such a failure. Example: I have fewer appointments."

Given the topic, audiences and critics had actually been expecting the production to be a theatrical adaptation of Camus's novel The Plague, in large part due to its recency and massive critical success. The style was similarly puzzling; The State of Siege's consciously medieval morality play–like structure seemed to be at odds with Camus's regular lionization of the traditional Greek tragedy. Critics at the time even blamed Barrault for having negatively affected Camus with his imposing disposition, causing Camus to write something contrary to his style and ability. It seemed to them unthinkable that a rising literary figure like Camus, who had produced a masterpiece on the same topic the year prior, could have produced such a failure. However, Camus took full responsibility for the play itself, including in its publication, and remarked that he had specifically intended to emulate medieval French morality plays and the similar Spanish autos sacramentales. This emulation aimed to impart an allegorical approach to the audience, which Camus felt had demonstrated success in spreading Catholic theology during the medieval period.

=== Modern ===
Retrospectives of Camus's work have been mostly negative. The Australian philosopher Matthew Sharpe describes the play as a "garish neo-baroque allegory" on revolt, though the French literary critic Marie-Gabrielle Nancey-Quentin de Gromard argues that the work represents the height of Camus's ambition in the theater, grappling against the Absurd and nihilism. For the French theatrical scholar Jeanyves Guérin, the play serves as "a stage, or better yet a laboratory," for Camus's philosophy to reflect back onto the audience.

The British literary critic E. Freeman calls it "the most ambitious of all Camus's plays – and the most unsuccessful". He states its main failing is that, although Camus and Barrault had come to the same idea and same theme independently, they were unable to effectively establish how the production would work on stage. Freeman describes the work as contrary to its inspiration in Artaud; the play's use of the Plague character dressed as a fascist military officer and its overuse of dialogue run contrary to Artaud's dramatic theories of subtlety. Freeman pillories Camus's overemphasis on criticizing propaganda as coming at the cost of its human characters, writing:

The root of the trouble is that amid the massive display of allegory and propaganda there is no human focus. Diego and Victoria in particular are virtually puppets, only too obviously exemplifying Camus's evolving philosophy of limits. They are not credible as human beings and are given to mouthing statements [...] in an inflated pseudo-poetic style on which occasions sound like a pastiche Claudel, or Corneille at one huge remove, such as that of being translated into English and back into French with the alexandrines missing.

== Analysis ==
=== Social commentary ===
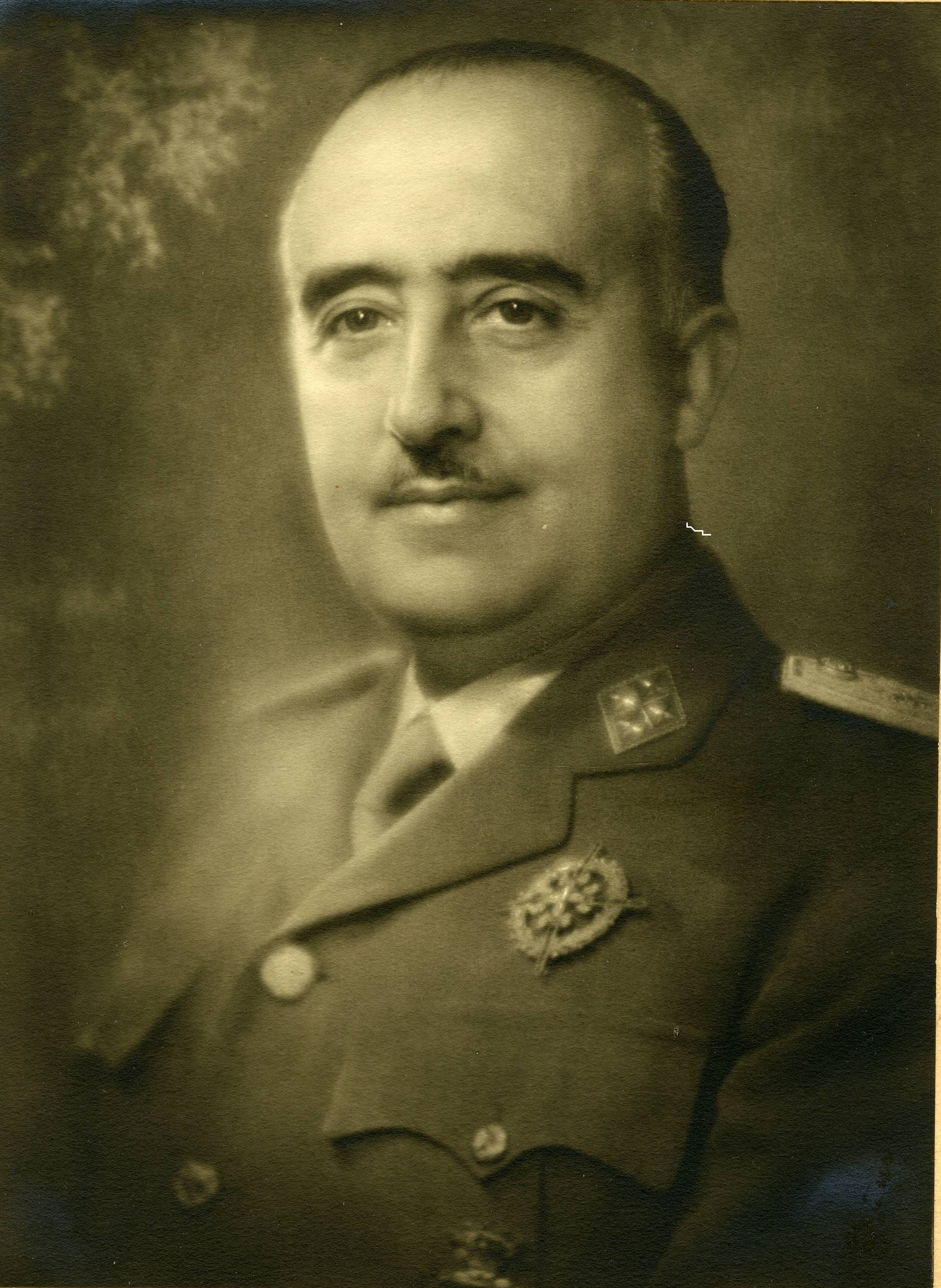
Camus chose to set the play in Spain given the early use of totalitarian oppression in Spain under Francisco Franco.

Camus stated that he made no serious effort to obfuscate the clear symbolic role of each of the characters. Judge Casado is a stand-in for a conservative and traditionalist member of the establishment committed to the rule of law, Nada is representative of hyperintellectualized nihilism, while Diego is used to express the Camusian ideal of revolt. The secretary is generally thought to represent death itself, though she may also represent destiny in a similar vein to the deifications of fate found in classical antiquity.

Camus's four original plays are about the role of revolt, each from a different perspective; The State of Siege is about the role of coordinated revolt can overthrow a dictatorship, complemented by his following play The Just which expresses the limits of such coordination. The Plague's dictatorship is an amalgamation of Camus's criticisms of totalitarianism overall, irrespective of their origins from the political left or the right. The play incorporates elements of Stalinism, Nazism, Italian fascism, and Spanish Falangism, though Camus stated that he chose Spain as the setting specifically because "the first weapons of totalitarian war were bathed in Spanish blood" under the Francoist regime.

Freeman argues that The Just and The State of Siege, as more socially and politically conscious, signal Camus's disillusionment with what post-war France could achieve. Camus saw France as moving into the lowest point of its moral history, rattled by the instability that had been created at home by the Third Republic and reports of torture being used in French holdings in Sétif, Kabyle, and Madagascar. Freeman relates Camus's enthusiasm to re-engage with the plague theme as an attempt to engage a more popular audience with "purgative" critiques of contemporary France in particular and Europe more broadly.

=== Judges ===
Judges serve a critical role in several of Camus's works, in large part because Camus sought to critique the administration of justice and the legal system itself. The role of judges is perhaps strongest in Camus's work in The State of Siege, where Casado is a detached and impersonal character, described by the French-American literary scholar Germaine Brée as "law without justice". The American literary scholar Peter J. Reed argues that Casado views his role in the legal system for temporal justice as an extension of divine justice, which Camus criticizes with the use of the judge's wife; while the judge calls his wife a "bitch", the wife's returned insult is that the man is a judge, intended as a term of equal contempt. He characterizes Camus's attack on the judge "the most violent and complete to be found in his theater", and more acerbic than treatments found in his novels The Plague, The Fall, and The Stranger.

=== Women ===
Since the late 1960s, Camus's employment of female characters has been the subject of scholarly interest. The American literary critic Jerry L. Curtis writes that women in the play serve as a "unified front" about the role of women in society, as defenders of tradition; the women in the play in general aim to be wives and mothers who rebel against separation from their men. For example, Christine Margerrison notes that Diego's reluctance to sacrifice the city for love contrasts with Victoria's insistence that she would have made the sacrifice exclusively because severance from love was an unacceptable outcome. Margerrison suggests that part of Camus's perspective of revolt meant rising above social and even biological pressures, thereby both relegating women to the role of the "selfish gene" and yet using such a characterization to point out that "man is more than his biology and his instinct of revolt is the only defence against the definitive silence of totalitarianism". In a similar vein, the secretary's collaboration with Diego reminds him of his duty toward justice and the value of revolt.

Anthony Rizzuto describes The State of Siege as marking a transition in Camus's use of the male–female dichotomy from the "politics of male fraternity", represented strongly by works like The Plague during Camus's more optimistic period about post-war France, into a "politics of fertility", where women are more salient characters. However, this view has been challenged by other scholars such as Louise K. Horowitz, who characterizes Camus as having "systematically excluded – one is tempted to say eradicated – both women and the colonial Arab population of North Africa from his work". Still, Curtis argues that The State of Siege demonstrates the salience of women, especially through their vocal disapproval of their male counterparts, more than any of Camus's other works. Reed considers Camus's treatment of Casado's wife, despite her infidelity, as sympathetic and views her character as an extension of his criticism of the legal system.

=== Comparisons with The Plague ===
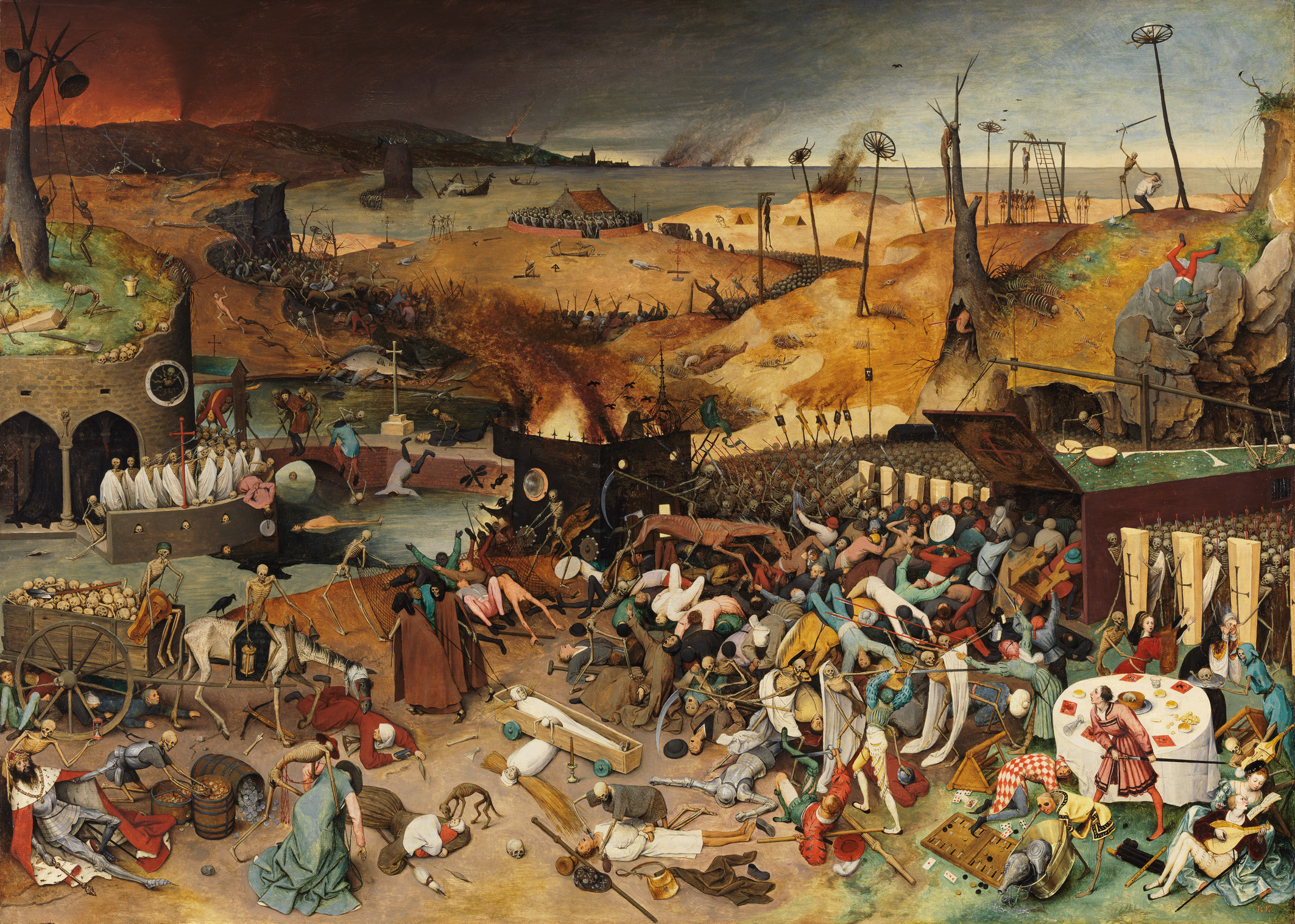
Several critics argued that the plague theme in Camus's works serves as a poor metaphor for authoritarianism. (The Triumph of Death by Pieter Bruegel the Elder, c. 1562)

Because of the shared theme and relatively short time between their publications, The State of Siege is often associated with The Plague. The American philosopher David Sherman suggests that Camus may have revisited the plague theme to reject the most common criticism leveled at The Plague, that pestilence is a poor choice of metaphor for authoritarianism because conflict with people is substantially different than combating disease. Also like The Plague, The State of Siege serves to demonstrate that "totalitarianism results from a bourgeois vapidity that fails to foster solidarity" and express that only through conscious effort to create solidarity can freedom be preserved.

Freeman contrasts The State of Siege's use of the plague metaphor in the context of Camus's Artaudian inspiration with its use in The Plague. In the latter, the plague symbolizes "the evil which lurks in men's souls like rats in dark corners", whereas in The State of Siege it is a character so clumsily rendered that he is dressed even to evoke a Nazi figure. Similarly, he argues that the innocence of the plague victims in The Plague highlights Camus's conception of the Absurd, but victims in the play are killed by the will of "human manifestations" and often deserve their deaths, thus losing the important absurdist concept that precedes Camusian revolt.

=== Within Camus's oeuvre ===
Camus placed his works into particular periods, which he called "cycles", based on the biblical motif or pagan myth they represent. The State of Siege falls into the Promethean period between 1943 and 1952, where rebellion is the most salient motif. He links the play with the following play The Just (1949), The Plague (1947), and the essay The Rebel (1951).

Freeman categorizes Camus's theatrical work in particular into three major phases. He places The State of Siege in the second period, "the high-water mark of Camus's dramatic activity", which includes all four of Camus's original plays: Caligula, The Misunderstanding, The Just, and The State of Siege. Caligula and The Misunderstanding place their emphasis on metaphysics of the Absurd and meditate on its nature, while The Just and The State of Siege are didactic and deal with the more concrete social and political ramifications.

The State of Siege has some parallels to Révolte dans les Asturies ('Revolt in Asturias', 1935), a play Camus wrote with several other collaborators regarding the Asturian Revolution of 1934. Both plays take place in Spain, (Note: Révolte takes place in Oviedo.) tackle the theme of rebellion, and apply some agitprop techniques while relying on jarring sounds, stage movement, and lighting effects. There are also parallels between the character of Pèpe in Révolte and Diego in the The State of Siege, both characters representative of rebellion.

Camus remained committed to the play throughout his life despite its negative appraisal. He remarked that he "never stopped believing that, of all my writings, [The State of Siege ] may be, with all its flaws, the one that provides the most accurate picture of me".

== See also ==
- Disease in fiction
- The Flies – 1943 play by Jean-Paul Sartre
- Neither Victims nor Executioners – Series of essays by Albert Camus
- Theater of the absurd – Theatrical genre since the 1950s
- The Trial – 1925 novel by Franz Kafka
