= Georges Loinger =

French soldier and participant in the French Resistance

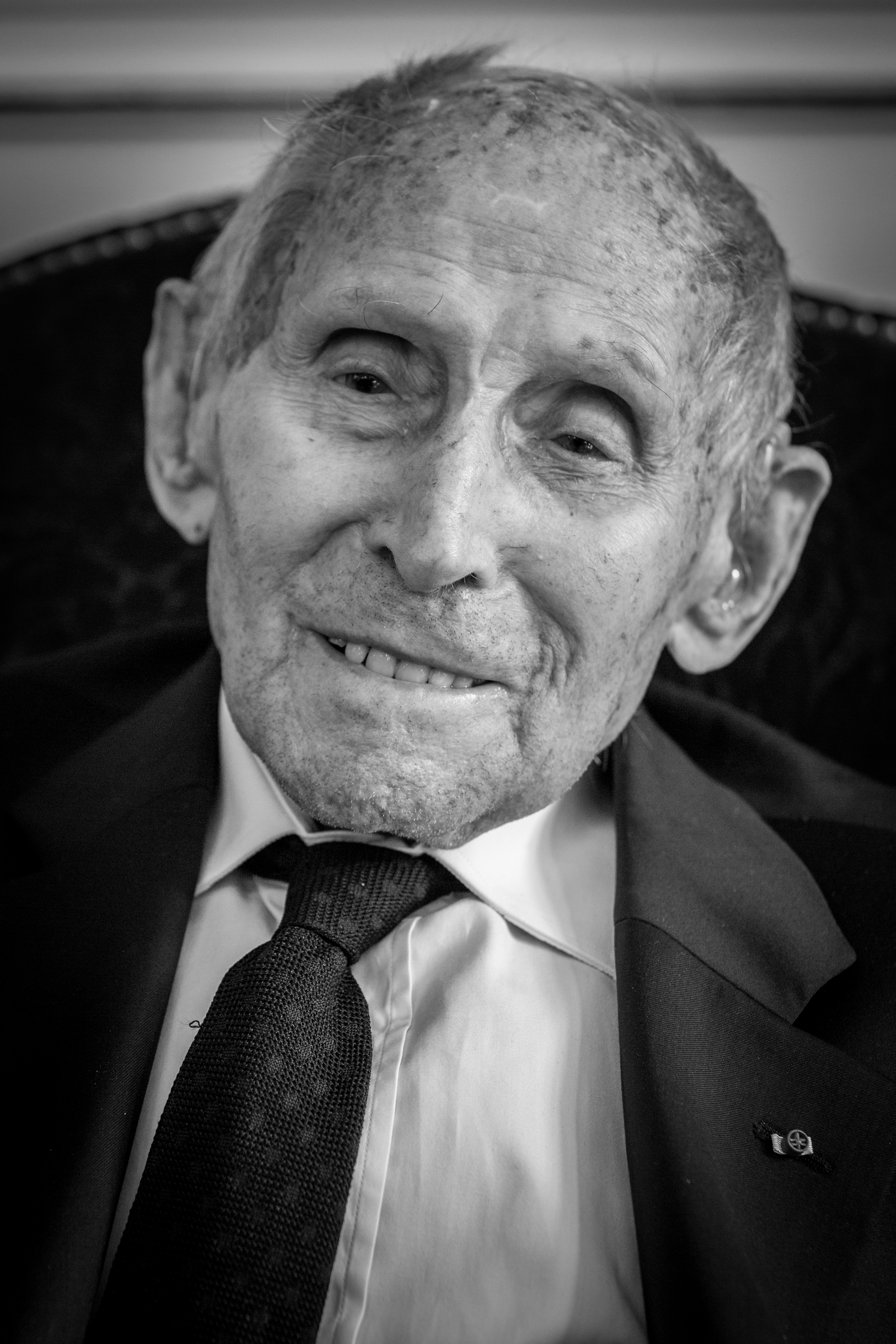
- Georges Loinger in 2014
- Born: 29 August 1910; Strasbourg, Alsace-Lorraine, German Empire
- Died: 28 December 2018 (aged 108); Paris, France
- Known for: Resistance fighter
- Relatives: Yardena Arazi (niece); Marcel Marceau (cousin)

Georges Loinger BVO (29 August 1910 – 28 December 2018) was a French soldier during World War II. During his time in the French Resistance, he helped hundreds of Jewish children escape from occupied France to Switzerland.

== Early life ==
He was born on 29 August 1910 in Strasbourg, France (then part of Imperial Germany) to Jewish parents Solomon Loinger (1883–1971) and Mina Werzberg (1886–1981). In 1925, he entered the Hatikvah Zionist youth movement.

== World War II ==
Loinger began fighting against Nazi Germany at the start of World War II, but was captured in 1940. He escaped from his prisoner-of-war camp later that year and joined the French Resistance. He rescued about 350 Jewish children, and helped them to escape from France to Switzerland, for which he was awarded the Resistance Medal, the Croix de Guerre and the Legion of Honour. Until September 1943, this frontier was guarded by the Italian army; Loinger remembered an Italian senior officer privately telling him he approved of Loinger's actions. After September, there was German occupation and Loinger's task became harder. A physical education teacher, he used tactics such as organizing soccer games in Annemasse on the border of Geneva, and having players continue running across the border guarded only by barbed wire.

== Awards and honours ==
He was appointed chairman of the Association of the Jewish Resistance of France (ARJF). In March 2013, he was received by Shimon Peres, the former president of Israel. In 2014, he was awarded the medal of honorary citizen of the city of Strasbourg. In July 2016, he was made an officer in the Order of Merit of the Federal Republic of Germany. He was awarded the Resistance Medal, the Croix de Guerre, and in 2005 the Legion of Honour.

== Personal life ==
His cousin was the famed mime Marcel Marceau, and his niece is Israeli singer Yardena Arazi.

Loinger died in Paris on 28 December 2018 at the age of 108.
