= The Plague (novel) =

1947 novel by Albert Camus

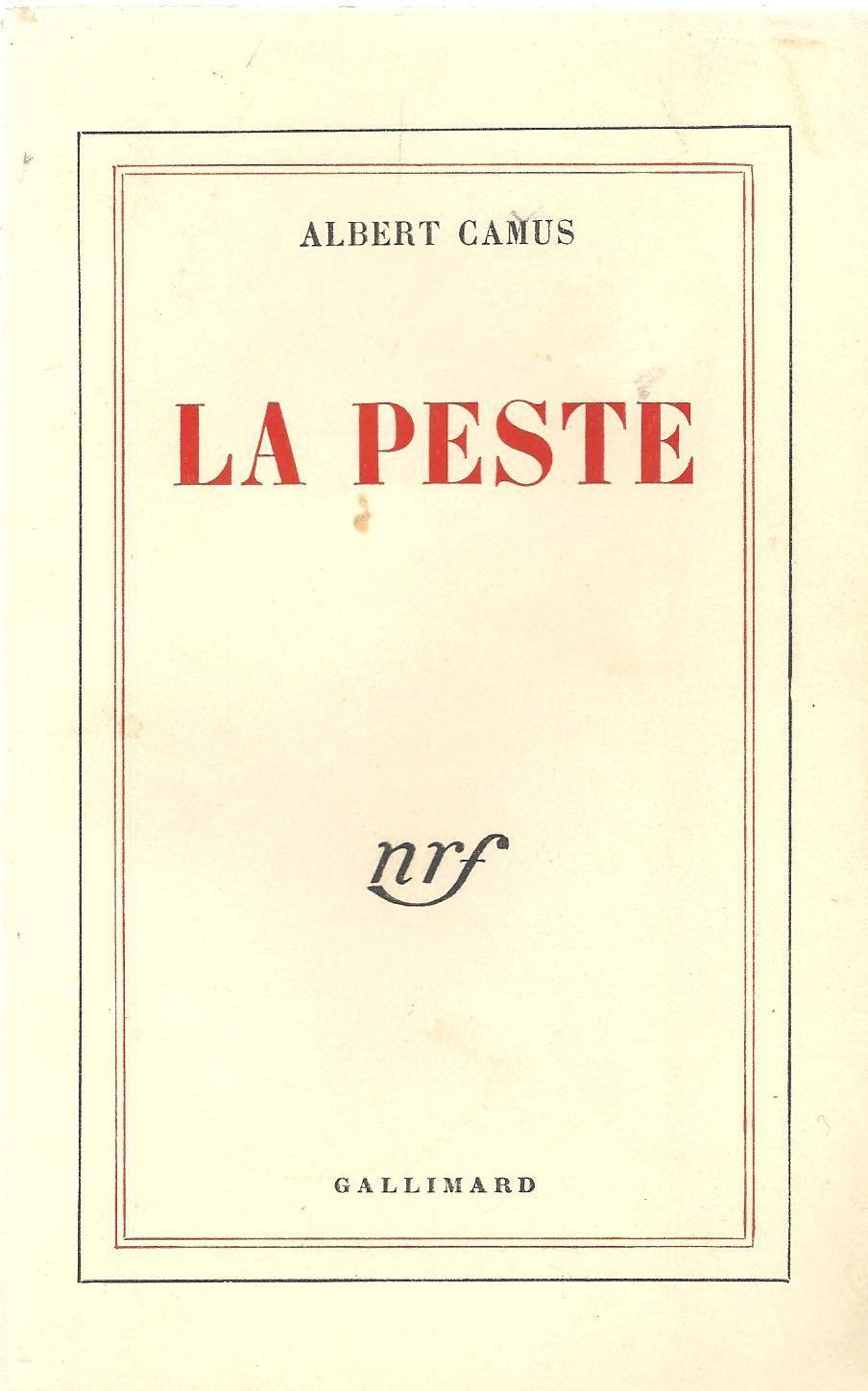
- Cover of the first edition
- Author: Albert Camus
- Original title: La Peste
- Language: French
- Genre: Philosophical novel
- Set in: Oran, French Algeria
- Published: 1947 (Gallimard, French); 1948 (Hamish Hamilton, English)
- Publication place: France
- Pages: 308
- ISBN: 978-0679720218
- Preceded by: Resistance, Rebellion, and Death
- Followed by: The State of Siege

The Plague (French: La Peste) is a 1947 absurdist novel by Albert Camus. The plot centers around the French Algerian city of Oran as it combats a plague outbreak and is put under a city-wide quarantine. The novel presents a snapshot into life in Oran as seen through Camus's absurdist lens.

Camus used as source material the cholera epidemic that killed a large proportion of Oran's population in 1849, but set the novel in the 1940s. Oran and its surroundings were struck by disease several times before Camus published his novel. According to an academic study, Oran was decimated by the bubonic plague in 1556 and 1678, but all later outbreaks (185 cases in 1921, 76 cases in 1931, and 95 cases in 1944) were very far from the scale of the epidemic described in the novel.

The Plague is considered an existentialist classic despite Camus's objection to the label. The novel stresses the powerlessness of the individual characters to affect their own destinies. The narrative tone is similar to Kafka's, especially in The Trial, whose individual sentences potentially have multiple meanings; the material often pointedly resonating as stark allegory of phenomenal consciousness and the human condition.

== Plot ==
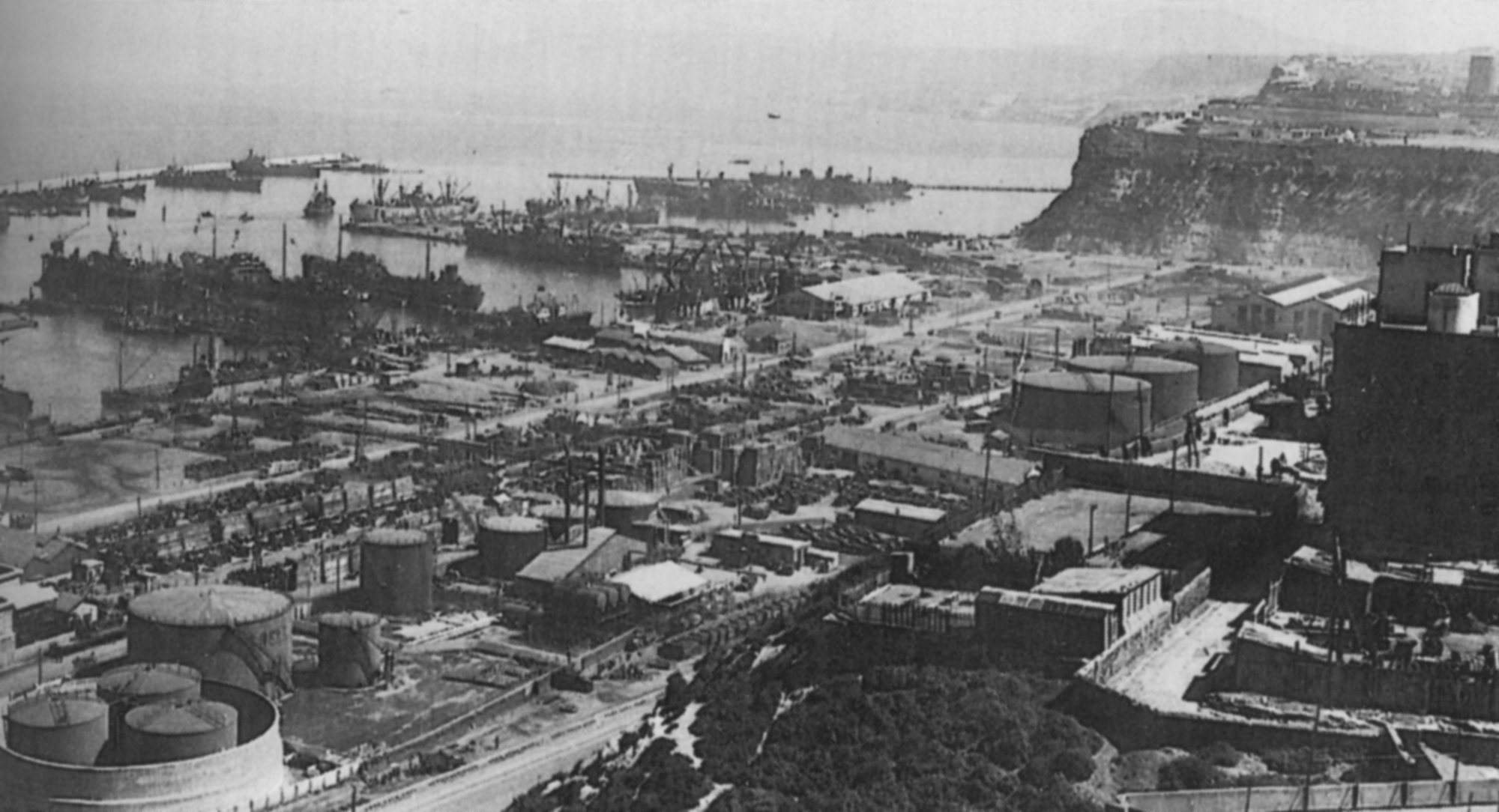
View of Oran in 1943

In 1940s Oran, rats, initially unnoticed by the populace, begin dying en masse. Hysteria develops soon afterward, prompting local newspapers to report the incident; authorities begin disposing of the rats. Bernard Rieux, a local physician, learns that a concierge in his building has died from a fever and consults a colleague about the illness. They conclude that a plague is sweeping the town and approach other doctors and town authorities about their theory, which is met with denial. As more deaths ensue, it becomes apparent that an epidemic is imminent.

Authorities are slow to accept that the situation is serious and quibble over the appropriate action to take. Official notices enacting control measures are posted, but they downplay the seriousness of the situation. As the death toll begins to rise, homes are quarantined and corpses are strictly supervised. A supply of anti-plague serum arrives, but there is only enough to treat existing cases and the national emergency reserves are depleted. Eventually, the town is quarantined and an epidemic is officially declared.

Raymond Rambert, a visiting journalist, devises a plan to escape to join his girlfriend in Paris by courting criminals to smuggle him out. The local Jesuit priest, Father Paneloux, suggests during a sermon that the plague is God punishing the city's sinfulness. His diatribe leads many citizens of the town to turn to religion who would not have done so under normal circumstances. Cottard, a remorseful criminal who attempted suicide earlier, becomes wealthy as a major smuggler. Meanwhile, Jean Tarrou, a vacationer, and Joseph Grand, a civil engineer, assist Rieux in treating patients in their homes and in the hospital.

Rambert informs Tarrou of his escape plan. Tarrou tells him that there are others in the city who have loved ones outside the city; Rambert becomes sympathetic and offers to help until he leaves. By mid-August, people trying to escape the town are shot by armed sentries. Violence and looting break out, leading authorities to declare martial law and impose a curfew. Funerals are conducted with more speed, with no ceremony and little concern for the bereaved.

Rambert finally has a chance to escape, but decides to stay, saying that he would feel ashamed of himself if he left. Towards the end of October, an anti-plague serum is tried for the first time on the local magistrate Othon's son; the serum fails and he suffers intensely as Paneloux, Rieux, and Tarrou tend to him in horror.

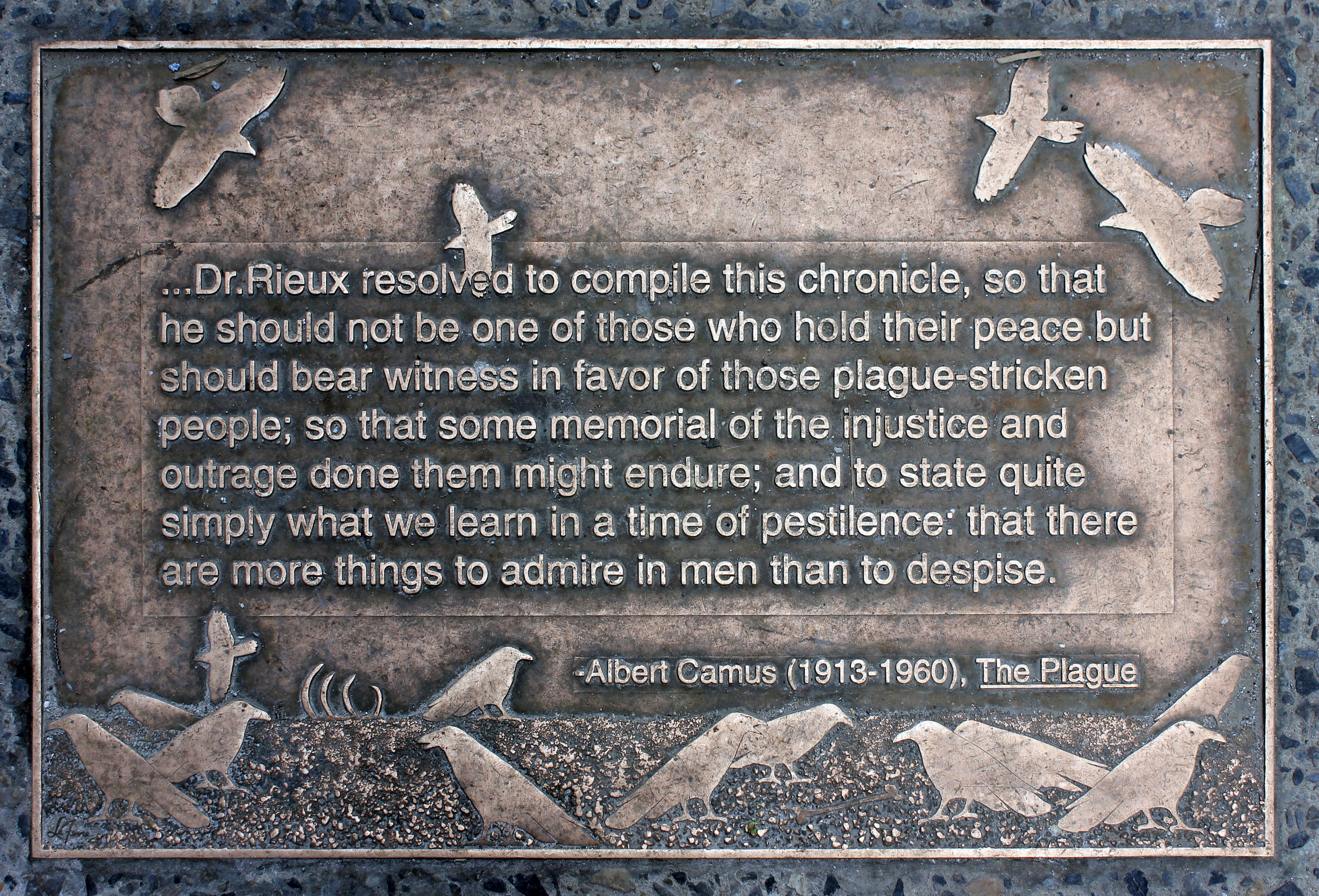
Sidewalk plaque with a quote from The Plague in New York City

Paneloux, who has joined the group of volunteers fighting the plague, gives a second sermon. He addresses the problem of an innocent child's suffering and says it is a test of faith since it requires him either to deny everything or believe everything. He urges the congregation not to give up, but to do everything possible to fight the plague. A few days after the sermon, Paneloux becomes ill; his symptoms do not conform to those of the plague, but the disease still proves fatal.

Tarrou and Rambert visit an isolation camp where they encounter the magistrate Othon. When Othon's quarantine ends, he chooses to stay in the camp as a volunteer to feel less separated from his dead son. Tarrou tells Rieux the story of his life and his opposition to violence, the death penalty in particular. To take their mind off the epidemic, the two men go swimming in the sea. Grand catches the plague and instructs Rieux to burn all his papers, but makes an unexpected recovery. Deaths from the plague start to decline.

By late January, the plague is in full retreat and the townspeople celebrate. Cottard is distressed by the end of the quarantine, as it has profited him greatly. Two government employees approach him and he flees. Despite the epidemic receding, Tarrou contracts the plague and dies after a heroic struggle. In February, the town gates open and people are reunited with their loved ones. Cottard has a mental breakdown and shoots at people from his home, killing a dog before being arrested. Rieux discloses his identity to the reader as the narrator and states that he tried to present an objective view of the events. He reflects on the epidemic and declares he wrote the chronicle to explain that, even in crisis, people are more good than evil.

== Critical analysis ==
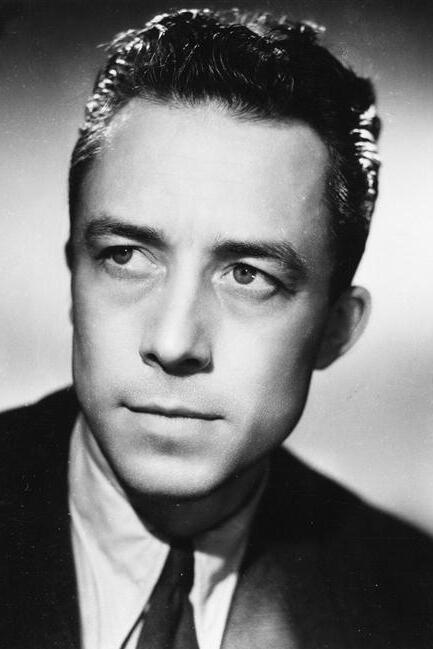
Camus in 1945

Germaine Brée has characterised the struggle of the characters against the plague as "undramatic and stubborn", and in contrast to the ideology of "glorification of power" in the novels of André Malraux, whereas Camus's characters "are obscurely engaged in saving, not destroying, and this in the name of no ideology". Lulu Haroutunian has discussed Camus's own medical history, including a bout with tuberculosis, and how it informs the novel. Marina Warner notes its larger philosophical themes of "engagement", "paltriness and generosity", "small heroism and large cowardice", and "all kinds of profoundly humanist problems, such as love and goodness, happiness and mutual connection".

Thomas L Hanna and John Loose have separately discussed themes related to Christianity in the novel, with particular respect to Father Paneloux and Doctor Bernard Rieux. Louis R Rossi briefly discusses the role of Tarrou in the novel, and the sense of philosophical guilt behind his character. Elwyn Sterling has analysed the role of Cottard and his final actions at the end of the novel. Father Paneloux has been subject to several literary analyses in the context of faith faced with great suffering.

Dr Rieux has been described as a classic example of an idealist doctor. He has also been an inspiration to the life and career of the French doctor Réjean Thomas, and also to the fictional character of Jeanne Dion, starring in the movie trilogy directed by Bernard Émond (beginning with The Novena).

Perri Klass has noted that at the time of the novel, sulfa drugs were available for treatment against plague, and has criticised the novel for this historical-medical omission.

Journalist Carlos Maza conducted a critical deep dive into the novel, drawing parallels to the contemporary political climate, including Trumpism and the COVID-19 pandemic.

== In the popular press ==
The novel has been read as an allegorical treatment of the French resistance to Nazi occupation during World War II.

The novel became a bestseller during the worldwide COVID-19 pandemic of 2020 to the point that its British publisher Penguin Classics reported struggling to keep up with demand. The prescience of the fictional cordon sanitaire of Oran with real-life COVID-19 lockdowns worldwide brought revived popular attention. Sales in Italy tripled, and it became a top-ten bestseller during its nationwide lockdown. Penguin Classics' editorial director said "it couldn’t be more relevant to the current moment" and Camus's daughter Catherine said that the message of the novel had newfound relevance in that "we are not responsible for coronavirus but we can be responsible in the way we respond to it".

== Adaptations ==
- 1965: La Peste, a cantata composed by Roberto Gerhard
- 1970: Yesterday, Today, Tomorrow, a Hong Kong film directed by Patrick Lung
- 1992: La Peste, a film directed by Luis Puenzo
- 2017: The Plague, a play adapted by Neil Bartlett. Bartlett substitutes a black woman for the male doctor, Rieux, and a black man for Tarrou.
- 2020: The Plague, an adaptation for radio of Neil Bartlett's 2017 play. Premiered on 26 July on BBC Radio 4 during the COVID-19 pandemic. The play was recorded at home by actors during the quarantine period. With Sara Powell as Doctor Rieux, Billy Postlethwaite as Raymond Rambert, Joe Alessi as Mr Cottard, Jude Aduwudike as Jean Tarrou and Colin Hurley as Mr Grand.

== Publication history ==
As early as April 1941, Camus had been working on the novel, as evidenced in his diaries in which he wrote down a few ideas on "the redeeming plague". On 13 March 1942, he informed André Malraux that he was writing "a novel on the plague", adding "Said like that it might sound strange, […] but this subject seems so natural to me."

- 1947, La Peste (French), Paris: Gallimard
- 1948, translated by Stuart Gilbert, London: Hamish Hamilton
- 1960, translated by Stuart Gilbert, London: Penguin, ISBN 978-0-140-18020-6
- 2001, translated by Robin Buss, London: Allen Lane, ISBN 978-0-713-99597-8
- 2021, translated by Laura Marris, New York: Knopf, ISBN 978-0-593-31866-9

== See also ==
- The Decameron
- The Masque of the Red Death
- The Betrothed
