= Disease in fiction =

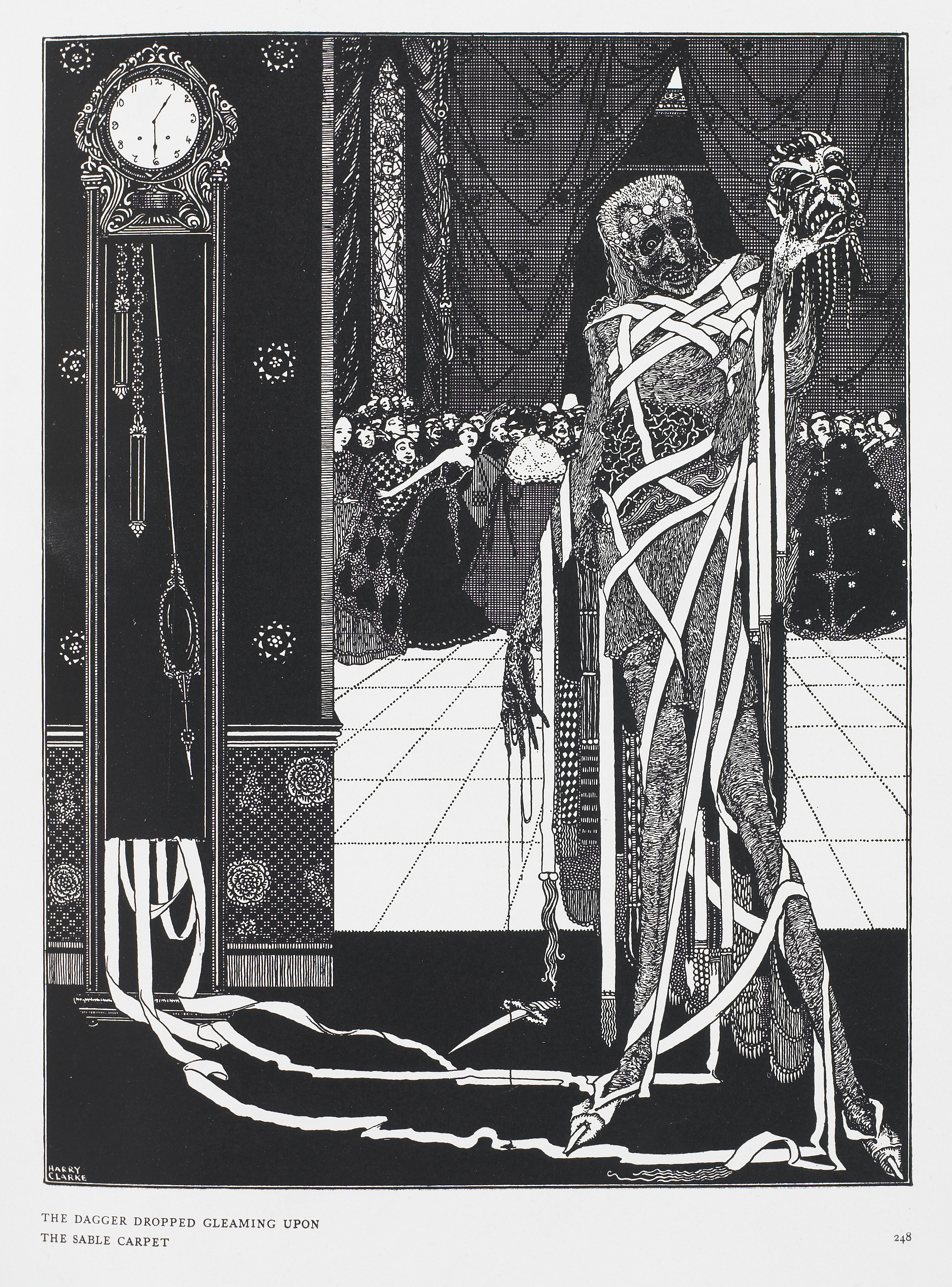
1919 illustration by Harry Clarke for Edgar Allan Poe's 1842 The Masque of the Red Death

Diseases, both real and fictional, play a significant role in fiction, with certain diseases like Huntington's disease and tuberculosis appearing in many books and films. Pandemic plagues threatening all human life, such as The Andromeda Strain, are among the many fictional diseases described in literature and film.

== Real diseases ==
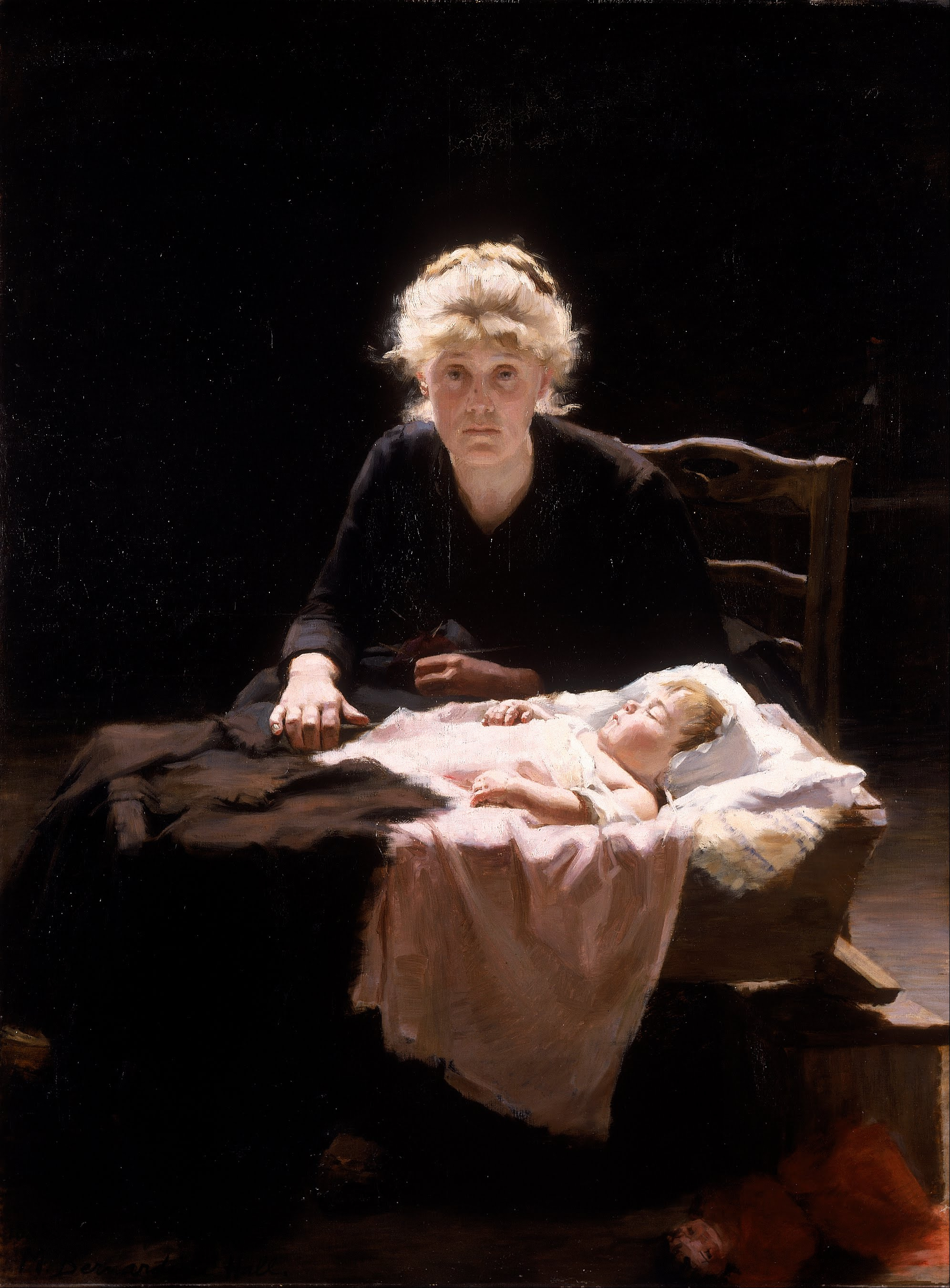
Victor Hugo's character Fantine (in his 1862 novel Les Misérables) with consumption in an 1886 painting by Margaret Bernadine Hall

Genuine plagues have formed the central elements of books from Giovanni Boccaccio's c. 1353 The Decameron onwards. Boccaccio tells the tales of ten people of Florence who escape from the Black Death in their city. The book inspired Geoffrey Chaucer's 14th-century Canterbury Tales, which similarly tells the stories of people on pilgrimage in a time of plague. Ingmar Bergman's 1957 film The Seventh Seal (Swedish: Det sjunde inseglet) is set in Denmark during the Black Death, and features a game of chess with Death personified as a monk-like figure.

Tuberculosis was a common disease in the 19th century, and it appeared in several major works of Russian literature. Fyodor Dostoevsky used the theme of the consumptive nihilist repeatedly, with Katerina Ivanovna in Crime and Punishment; Kirillov in The Possessed, and both Ippolit and Marie in The Idiot. Turgenev did the same with Bazarov in Fathers and Sons. In English literature of the Victorian era, major tuberculosis novels include Charles Dickens's 1848 Dombey and Son, Elizabeth Gaskell's 1855 North and South, and Mrs. Humphry Ward's 1900 Eleanor.

Albert Camus's 1947 The Plague, probably based on cholera in 19th-century France, was seen both as fable about the need for people to help each other in the meaningless world seen by absurdism, and as alluding to the German invasion of France, fresh in Camus's mind. His stage play The State of Siege, which premiered the following year, uses the bubonic plague to criticize authoritarianism and rebellion against the Absurd.

Huntington's disease appears in many novels, such as Ian McEwan's 2005 Saturday. It was criticised as prejudiced in the medical journal The Lancet for its negative portrayal of the protagonist with the disease.

== Fictional diseases ==
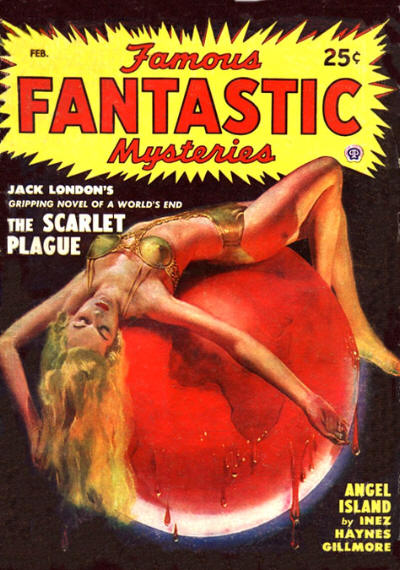
Jack London's 1912 The Scarlet Plague was reprinted in the February 1949 issue of Famous Fantastic Mysteries

Diseases, especially if infectious, have long been popular themes and plot devices in fiction. Daniel Defoe's pioneering 1722 A Journal of the Plague Year is a fictional diary of a man's life during the plague year of 1665 in England. Mary Shelley's 1826 The Last Man created the genre of "post-apocalyptic pandemic thriller" with her story of a plague that is spreading across Europe towards her protagonists in Britain. Edgar Allan Poe's 1842 "The Masque of the Red Death" is a gothic tale of a plague, perhaps symbolising the hubris of the wealthy, and their nemesis.

More recently, Michael Crichton's 1969 The Andromeda Strain is a science fiction thriller about a world-threatening microbe that a military satellite brings down to Earth and wipes out a town in Arizona. White-coated scientists do their best to contain the outbreak. The 1995 12 Monkeys is another post-apocalyptic thriller.

== See also ==
- Biology in fiction
- Medical fiction
- Parasites in fiction
