= Yesterday, Today, Tomorrow (1970 film) =

1970 Hong Kong film by Patrick Lung

- Theatrical release poster
- Traditional Chinese: 昨天今天明天
- Jyutping: Zok^{3} Tin^{1} Gam^{1} Tin^{1} Ming^{4} Tin^{1}
- Directed by: Patrick Lung
- Screenplay by: Patrick Lung; Xi Xi
- Based on: The Plague by Albert Camus
- Produced by: Chia-En Li (李嘉恩)
- Starring: Cheung Chung; Nancy Sit; Chang Yang; Lam Yun-ching
- Cinematography: Wong Ming
- Edited by: Cheng Keung
- Music by: Lau Wang-yuen
- Production company: Eng Wah Theatres Organisation (Hong Kong)
- Release date: 10 December 1970
- Running time: 72 minutes
- Country: Hong Kong
- Language: Mandarin
- Budget: ~ HK$400,000
- Box office: ~ HK$200,000

Yesterday, Today, Tomorrow (Chinese: 昨天今天明天) is a 1970 Hong Kong drama film. It was directed and written by Patrick Lung, with Chang Yang, Lam Yun-ching, Cheung Chung in the cast. Adapted from Albert Camus's novel The Plague, the film depicts an epidemic in Hong Kong and the resulting social upheaval. Produced after the 1967 riots, it attracted attention for its perceived political allegories and was heavily censored before release.

In 2011, the film was selected by the Hong Kong Film Archive as one of the "100 Must-See Hong Kong Films."

== Plot ==
World magazine correspondent Xie Wei-xian travels to Hong Kong, where he meets his tour guide Rose. During his visit, a rat-borne epidemic breaks out after the owner of a plastic factory falls ill and dies from an unknown infection. Those who become ill may suffer from incoherent speech and madness.

The worker unknowingly spreads the virus from place to place. The plague rapidly spreads throughout Hong Kong, causing panic and leading the authorities to impose quarantine measures. As the crisis worsens, Director Chow of the Health Department declares Hong Kong an epidemic area and introduces quarantine measures. Some infected people attempt to evade quarantine, while others volunteer to join medical relief teams.

Factory worker Law Tsui-kam loses her fiancé Ah Kau to the disease and is sent to a quarantine camp with his family. Xie initially plans to leave Hong Kong but chooses to stay and help with relief efforts alongside Rose. Journalist Paul Cheung, who reports on the epidemic and encourages the public, also joins the relief team. As society collapses and crime rises, Paul is killed by an infected patient, and Xie also dies after contracting the disease.

Dr. Lee, who has been working to develop a new drug, decides to test it on a dying child. The child miraculously survives. After the new drug is successfully developed, Hong Kong begins to recover.

== Cast ==
- Chang Yang as Xie Wei-xian, World magazine correspondent
- Lam Yun-ching as Rose, a tour guide
- Cheung Chung as Paul Cheung, a journalist
- Kenneth Tsang as Director Chow of the Health Department
- Wai Kei as Ah Kau, a taxi driver and fiancé of Law Tsui-kam
- Nancy Sit as Law Tsui-kam, fiancé of Ah Kau
- Fung Fung as owner of a plastic factory where the plague begins
- Cheung Ying-choi as hospital dean
- Man Nei as Dr. Lee
- Szema Wah Lung as Dr. Lee's colleague
- To Ping as plastic factory worker
- Paul Chu Kwong as Ah Ken, a plastic factory worker
- Patrick Lung as Lai Song, a drug addict
- Law Lan as Lai Song's wife
- Unicorn Chan as drug dealer thug
- Pat Ting Hung as Ching Yee, a journalist; Paul Cheung's colleague and former lover
- Tina Leung as Mrs. Cheung
- Bowie Wu as an officer of the government pest control department
- Fung Ngai, referred to in the script as "the Boss," he is a mysterious figure pulling the strings behind the scenes. Most of his scenes were cut; the deleted material involved him providing funds to spread rumors and stir up trouble.

== Production ==
Patrick Lung initially asked writer Xi Xi to adapt Albert Camus's novel The Plague into a screenplay. He later revised the first draft himself, resulting in a version that differed significantly from the original.

Patrick Lung considered the film one of his more ambitious works, following his “one in three” principle of making a more challenging project after every three commercial successes to challenge conventional commercial filmmaking. Inspired by the social inequality he witnessed in 1960s Hong Kong, including the contrast between wealthy areas and squatter communities during water shortages, he chose an epidemic as the central theme. He recalled seeing polluted water sold to poor residents as clean spring water, which could lead to widespread illness. The film depicts a plague spreading from a factory and affecting all social classes, conveying the message that people should remain calm, support one another, and believe that the crisis will eventually pass.

The film received support from Hong Kong government departments, including the Medical and Health Department, which provided information and filming assistance. It featured a large ensemble cast of Mandarin and Cantonese film actors and had a production budget of over HK$400,000.

=== Censorship and cuts ===
The film was made only two years after the end of the 1967 riots, during a period when mainland China was undergoing the Cultural Revolution. Leftist groups in Hong Kong believed the film contained political allegories targeting them. They interpreted the "plague" as a metaphor for the Cultural Revolution, the rats spreading the disease as a symbol of leftist activists, and the journalist character Paul Cheung as a reference to radio broadcaster Lam Bun, who was killed during the 1967 riots for opposing leftist groups. These interpretations led to strong criticism of Patrick Lung. Some accused the film of being funded by the colonial government and claimed that he was a government agent. Commentaries from leftist newspapers such as Wen Wei Po was later collected in the book Director: Lung Kong 《導演：龍剛》, part of the Hong Kong Film Oral History Series.

Due to the political controversy surrounding the film, its original title The Plague (瘟疫) was changed to Yesterday, Today, Tomorrow. The film was also heavily edited, reduced from approximately two hours to 72 minutes before release. Lung later stated that, in addition to facing criticism himself, his production company, Eng Wah Theatres Organisation, was threatened. Producer Chia-En Li (李嘉恩) was contacted by unknown individuals who took the film copies from the company for further cuts before returning them for reassembly. Some dialogue was also revised and dubbed into Mandarin. Deleted material included religious references (such as references to the Book of Revelation in the opening sequence), elements about Paul Cheung's Hong Kong identity and the impact of his death, and scenes involving criminals exploiting the chaos, which were seen as possibly alluding to participants in the 1967 riots. The Hong Kong Film Archive later compared the original screenplay with the released version and documented the major deleted sections in Director: Lung Kong.
