= Medical fiction =

Fiction whose events center upon any medical environment

Medical fiction is fiction whose events center upon a hospital, an ambulance staff, or any medical environment. It is highly prevalent on television, especially as medical dramas, as well as in novels.

The depiction of medical institutions and their staff has been considered important both for the influence it has on the perception of their real counterparts, and the role it can play in medical education. Through their personal or collective experiences with specific diseases, medical institutions, and health professionals, the audience can relate to the situations depicted in medical fiction, contributing to the success of the genre. This familiarity with the subject matter requires a degree of realism in order "to avoid misinterpretations or false ideas about the medical institutional or professional practice".

Medical fiction also allows "the illustration and discussion of ethical dilemmas that are frequently not raised for reasons of discretion, embarrassment, or fear of retribution" in the scientific community.

The Babyland General Hospital is a different type of fiction in the form of an actual building, where the procedure of birth and adoption is played out with Cabbage Patch Kids dolls in a converted former hospital.

Alternatively, the term may refer to Narrative Medicine—stories written by medical professionals to help foster empathy and humanize the practice of medicine.

== History ==
Given the importance of healing and bodily transformations in general literature itself, the history of medical fiction arguably extends to the Greek civilization in the form of Asclepius, the ancient Greek god of medicine. In myth, and in the general understanding of the Greek people, the god was said to heal individuals through his temple priests.

One of the most well-known examples of medical fiction in dramaturgy is The Imaginary Invalid, written by Molière. The satire-comedy focuses on the medical profession and has a hypochondriac for its main character. The play lampoons the society of late 17th-century Paris, specifically the bourgeoisie, and is generally considered a piece of incisive social commentary.

One of, if not the earliest examples of science fiction can be found in Mary Shelley's Frankenstein. The novel itself concerns the abominable creation of Dr. Victor Frankenstein as the character attempts to circumvent death through the creation of life. As a medical fiction text, it explores several ethical themes, such as the role of a doctor as the preserver of life, the ethics of attempting to create life in unnatural ways, and the logical extremes of playing God.

An 1889 entry from the British Medical Journal seems to mark a societal shift in England by where doctors began to gain a higher status in society, and reflects on the historical practice of satirizing medical practitioners through the work of authors like Laurence Sterne, Henry Fielding, and Tobias Smollett. Four years later, the same journal would participate in the tradition of questioning medical accuracy in fiction, beginning by citing a request from Mark Twain to lecture on chemistry before the Royal Society, followed by a cursory dissection of various medical inaccuracies in, at the time, contemporary works of fiction.

The 1900s by and large saw the rise of the "doctor novel" as a literary subgenre, which itself is a subset of, or otherwise synonymous with, medical fiction.

A 2009 book, Doctors in Fiction: Lessons from Literature, discusses medical practitioners ranging from the late 12th century to the early 21st, including small analyzes of their particular time periods.

== Criticism ==
Concerns have been raised by medical professionals regarding inaccuracies present in medical dramas, citing unrealistic expectations that they may impose on viewers in relation to rapid response times and unconventional treatment at emergency rooms. These issues have been compounded by depictions of unprofessional behavior in shows like House, which, coupled with depictions of incorrect medical procedures, are said to have the possibility of imprinting negatively on medical students; nevertheless, critics and instructors argue these episodes might be used in academic settings to foster discussions on ethics, malpractice, and proper doctor-patient relationships.

Regarding medical novels, similar criticisms of artistic liberties and inaccuracies have been levied, but nevertheless grant that the literature might increase interest in the medical field and its history. In addition, attention has been directed towards the use of fiction as a useful tool for bioethicists to understand atypical and criminal behavior, such as the numerous murders by serial killer Harold Shipman.

== Subgenres ==
- Romance novels have an independent subcategory in medicine, medical romance, with its own settings and characters.
- Doctor novel
- Medical crime or conspiracy
- Medical research fiction
- Medical thriller
- Medical comedy
- Psychiatry in fiction
- Medical science fiction
- Medical poetry

=== Medical romance ===
ABC's Grey's Anatomy is a medical drama that employs the use of medical romance heavily throughout its narrative. The series follows the life and medical practice of the titular Meredith Grey as she balances her own personal life with the demanding stress of hospital bureaucracy and practice. Beginning in 2005 and currently still in production in 2024, the series became the longest running medical drama in 2019.

=== Medical research fiction ===
Medical research also features frequently in fiction. In contrast to medical treatment it is depicted in an ambivalent or negative way in many cases. Often associated with future developments, testing of ethical boundaries, especially with regard to experimentation on living subjects, is a common topic and gives expression to "deep-seated fears and expectations connected to our own lives". Notable examples are the mysterious Dharma Initiative from the TV series Lost, which follows a nefarious plan to influence humanity and employs characters of the mad scientist type, and Project Cadmus from DC Comics, a shady agency conducting genetic experiments disregarding any ethical boundaries. On the contrary S.T.A.R. Labs, also from DC Comics, is a research organization providing medical assistance to the heroes of the stories. So it is depicted in a generally positive light, but that presentation is foiled by a number of individual members conducting unethical experiments.

=== Medical thriller ===
The film Coma directed by Michael Crichton is a pioneer of the medical thriller.

Netflix's Ratched follows Nurse Ratched, the same character from One Flew Over the Cuckoo's Nest. The series explores her dark past and less-than-scrupulous behavior as a nurse, often employing murder and deceit to manipulate those around her in order to achieve her aims. The series appears to also humanize a typically unfavorably-viewed fictional character through the use of Ratched as a protagonist. As a medical piece, it explores themes of medical malpractice for personal gain and the perversion of conventional roles of healing.

=== Medical comedy ===
One of the most prominent examples of medical comedy is the American sitcom, Scrubs. The sitcom follows three medical interns on their journey through internship, residency, and ultimately become fully-fledged doctors. Often praised for its authenticity, the series occasionally tackled serious issues like infected organ donations, acceptance of death, and moral dilemmas. The series was nominated for over 17 Emmys, of which it won two.

=== Psychiatry in fiction ===
Settings treating mental health issues are frequently portrayed negatively in fiction. In fiction depicting mental health institutions, like the film One Flew Over the Cuckoo's Nest, revolt of the characters against control exercised by the institution is a common theme. Another notable example is the Arkham Asylum for the Criminally Insane in Batman comics: Hearkening back to the works of H. P. Lovecraft, it incorporates the "willful misremembering of historical madhouse regimes" into a contemporary setting, outwardly symbolized by a gothic-style building. It is a problematic depiction of mental illness as it both "trivializes the experience of going "mad"" and "demonstrates little interest in the actual workings of such institutions".

=== Medical science fiction ===
Kazuo Ishiguro's Never Let Me Go (novel) has been hailed as a dark, dystopian vision of a world where clones are used as organ harvesting farms. The book raises important medical themes about the personhood and agency of clones, layered with coming-of-age experiences that illustrate said personhood. The piece has also been used to analyze issues of quality of life and how vocational work can help contextualize and process grief.

An example of medical science fiction can be found in the science-fiction television episode "Ethics" in Star Trek: The Next Generation, in which one of the characters has his spinal cord replaced on a space station with a new one. In another case, the television episode "Babel" in Star Trek: Deep Space Nine mentions aphasia—a real life disorder—brought on by a virus. Aphasia concerns the "inability to understand or use written or spoken words," and is caused by a brain injury such as from a stroke, tumor, or infection.

=== Medical poetry ===
Anthony Hecht's poem, The Transparent Man, focuses on the patient experience of undergoing chemotherapy and the rationalization of death that may accompany the contraction of cancer.

Admission, Children's Unit is a poem written by Theodore Deppe that chronicles the treating of a child with cigarette burns on his body, inflicted by his mother's boyfriend. The poem deals with themes of religion and domestic abuse, and the nurse's reconciliation of the experience with his own recollection of St. Lawrence which he heard in high school.

== See also ==
- Disease in fiction
- Genetics in fiction
- List of fictional medical examiners
- Organ transplantation in fiction
- Fiction about psychiatry
- Transhumanism in fiction
