= Marcel Marceau =

French mime artist (1923–2007)

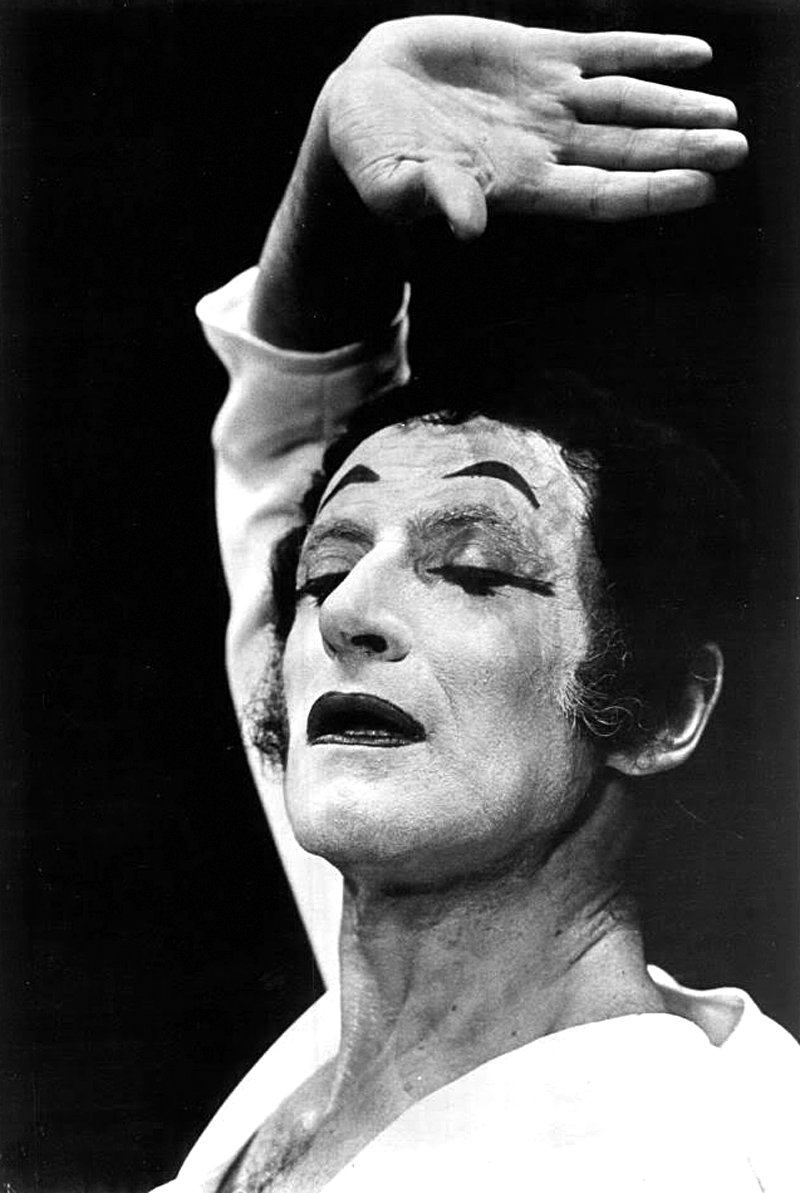
- Marceau in 1971
- Born: Marcel Mangel; 22 March 1923; Strasbourg, France
- Died: 22 September 2007 (aged 84); Cahors, France
- Resting place: Père Lachaise Cemetery
- Other name: "Le mime Marceau"
- Education: Charles Dullin's School of Dramatic Art
- Occupations: Mime artist; actor
- Years active: 1950s–2007
- Known for: Bip the Clown
- Spouses: Huguette Mallette (div. 1958): Ella Jaroszewicz (m. 1966; div. before 1975); Anne Sicco (m. 1975)
- Children: 4
- Relatives: Yardena Arazi (cousin); Georges Loinger (cousin)

Marcel Marceau (French: [maʁsɛl maʁso]; born Marcel Mangel; 22 March 1923 – 22 September 2007) was a French mime artist and actor most famous for his stage persona, "Bip the Clown". He referred to mime as the "art of silence", performing professionally worldwide for more than 60 years.

== Early life and education ==
Marcel Marceau was born on 22 March 1923 in Strasbourg, France, to a Jewish family. His father, Charles Mangel, was a kosher butcher originally from Będzin, Poland. His mother, Anne Werzberg, came from Yabluniv, present-day Ukraine. Through his mother's family, he was a cousin of Israeli singer Yardena Arazi. When Marcel was four years old, the family moved to Lille, but they later moved to England.

After France's invasion by Nazi Germany, Marcel, then 17, fled with his family to Limoges. His cousin Georges Loinger, one of the members of the French Jewish Resistance in France (Organisation Juive de Combat-OJC, aka Armée Juive), urged him to join in order to help rescue Jews during the Holocaust. The OJC, which was composed of nine clandestine Jewish networks, rescued thousands of Jewish children and adults during the war in France.

He was schooled in the Paris suburbs at the home of Yvonne Hagnauer, while pretending to be a worker at the school she directed; Hagnauer would later receive the honor of Righteous Among the Nations from Yad Vashem. In 1944 Marcel's father was captured by the Gestapo and deported to the Auschwitz concentration camp, where he was killed. Marcel's mother survived.

Marcel and his older brother, Alain, adopted the last name "Marceau" during the German occupation of France; the name was chosen as a reference to François Séverin Marceau-Desgraviers, a general of the French Revolution. The two brothers joined the French Resistance in Limoges. They rescued a number of children from the race laws and concentration camps in the framework of the Jewish Resistance in France, and, after the liberation of Paris, joined the French army. Owing to Marceau's fluency in English, French, and German, he worked as a liaison officer with General George Patton's Third Army.

According to Marceau, when he was five years of age, his mother took him to see a Charlie Chaplin film, which entranced him and led him to want to become a mime artist. The first time he used mime was after France was invaded, in order to keep Jewish children quiet while he helped them escape to Switzerland.

He gave his first major performance to 3,000 troops after the liberation of Paris in August 1944.

After the war ended in 1945, he enrolled as a student in Charles Dullin's School of Dramatic Art in the Sarah Bernhardt Theatre in Paris, where he studied with teachers such as Joshua Smith and Étienne Decroux and Jean-Louis Barrault.

== Career ==
Marceau joined Jean-Louis Barrault's company and was soon cast in the role of Arlequin in a pantomime, Baptiste (which Barrault had interpreted in the film Les Enfants du Paradis). Marceau's performance won him such acclaim that he was encouraged to present his first "mimodrama", Praxitele and the Golden Fish, at the Bernhardt Theatre that same year. The acclaim was unanimous, and Marceau's career as a mime artist was firmly established.

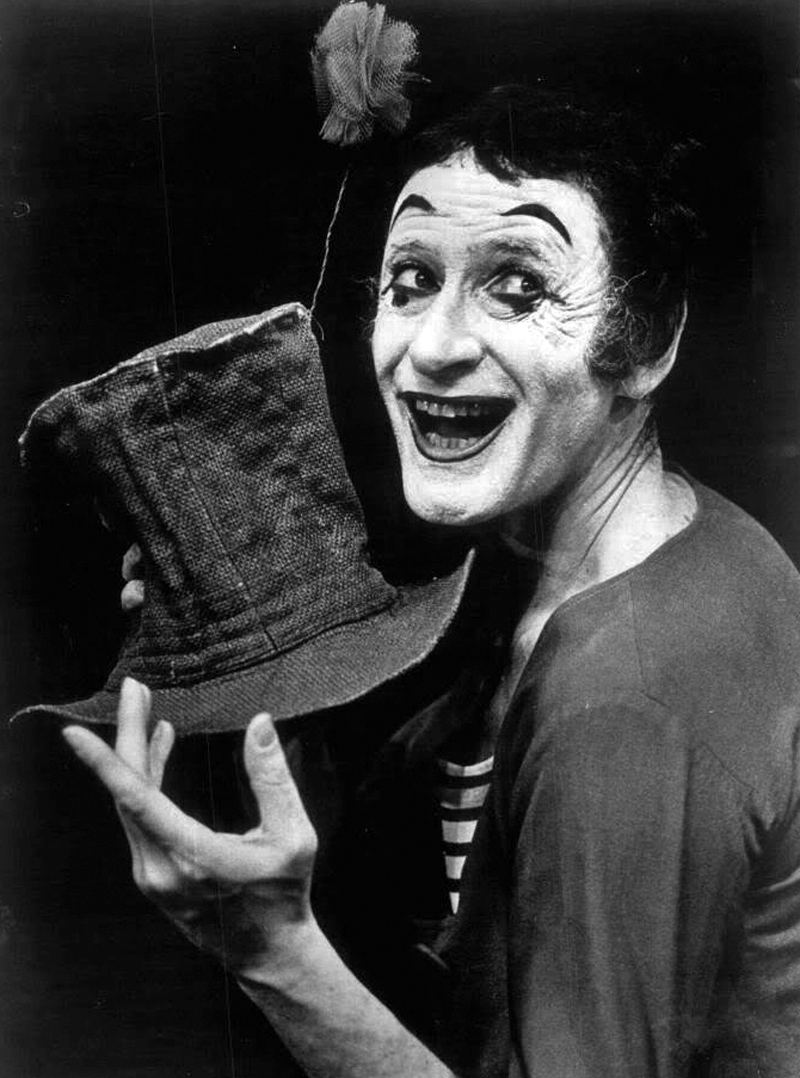
Marceau as Bip the Clown in 1974

In 1947 Marceau created Bip the Clown, whom he first played at the Théâtre de Poche (Pocket Theatre) in Paris. In his appearance, he wore a striped pullover and a battered, be-flowered silk opera hat. The outfit signified life's fragility, and Bip became his alter ego, just as the "Little Tramp" had become Charlie Chaplin's. Bip's misadventures with everything from butterflies to lions, from ships and trains to dance halls and restaurants, were limitless. As a stylist of pantomime, Marceau was acknowledged to be without peer. Marceau, during a televised talk with Todd Farley, expressed his respect for the mime techniques that Charlie Chaplin used in his films, noting that Chaplin seemed to be the only silent film actor who used mime.

His silent mimed exercises, which included The Cage, Walking Against the Wind, The Mask Maker, and In The Park, all became classic displays. Satires on everything from sculptors to matadors were described as works of genius. Of his summation of the ages of man in the famous Youth, Maturity, Old Age and Death, one critic said: "He accomplishes in less than two minutes what most novelists cannot do in volumes." During an interview with CBS in 1987, Marceau tried to explain some of his inner feelings while creating mime, calling it the "art of silence:"

The art of silence speaks to the soul, like music, making comedy, tragedy, and romance, involving you and your life. . . . creating character and space, by making a whole show on stage – showing our lives, our dreams, our expectations.

In 1949, following his receipt of the Deburau Prize (established as a memorial to the 19th-century mime master Jean-Gaspard Deburau) for his second mimodrama, Death before Dawn, Marceau founded Compagnie de Mime Marcel Marceau, the only company dedicated to the art of pantomime in the world at the time. The ensemble played the leading Paris theatres, such as Le Théâtre des Champs-Élysées, Le Théâtre de la Renaissance, and the Bernhardt Theatre, as well as other playhouses throughout the world.

From 1959 to 1960, a retrospective of his mimodramas, including The Overcoat by Gogol, ran for a full year at the Amibigu Théâtre in Paris. He produced 15 other mimodramas, including Pierrot de Montmartre, The Three Wigs, The Pawn Shop, 14 July, The Wolf of Tsu Ku Mi, Paris Cries — Paris Laughs and Don Juan (adapted from the Spanish writer Tirso de Molina).

=== World recognition ===
Marceau in 1974

Marceau performed all over the world to spread the "art of silence" (L'art du silence). It was the intellectual minority who knew of him until he first toured the United States in 1955 and 1956, close on the heels of his North American debut at the Stratford Festival of Canada. After his opening engagement at the Phoenix Theater in New York, which received rave reviews, he moved to the larger Barrymore Theater to accommodate the public demand. This first U.S. tour ended with a record-breaking return to standing-room-only crowds in San Francisco, Chicago, Washington, D.C., Philadelphia, Los Angeles, and other major cities. His extensive transcontinental tours included South America, Africa, Australia, China, Japan, South East Asia, Taiwan, Russia, and Europe. His last world tour covered the United States in 2004, and he returned to Europe in 2005 and to Australia in 2006. He was one of the world's most renowned mime artists.

Marceau's art became familiar to millions through his multiple television appearances. His first television performance as a star performer on the Max Liebman, Mike Douglas and Dinah Shore, and he also had his one-man show entitled "Meet Marcel Marceau". He teamed with Red Skelton in three concerts of pantomimes.

Marceau also showed his versatility in motion pictures such as Professor Ping in Barbarella (1968); First Class (1970), in which he played 17 roles; Shanks (1974), where he combined his silent art, playing a deaf and mute puppeteer, and his speaking talent, as a mad scientist; and a cameo as himself in Mel Brooks' Silent Movie (1976), in which, with intentional irony, his character has the only audible speaking part, uttering the single word "Non!" when Brooks asks him (via intertitle) if he would participate in the film. His last film appearances included small roles in Klaus Kinski's Paganini (1989) and Joseph's Gift (1998). He also had a role in a low-budget film roughly based on his life story called Paint It White. The film was never completed because another actor in the movie, a lifelong friend with whom he had attended school, died halfway through filming.

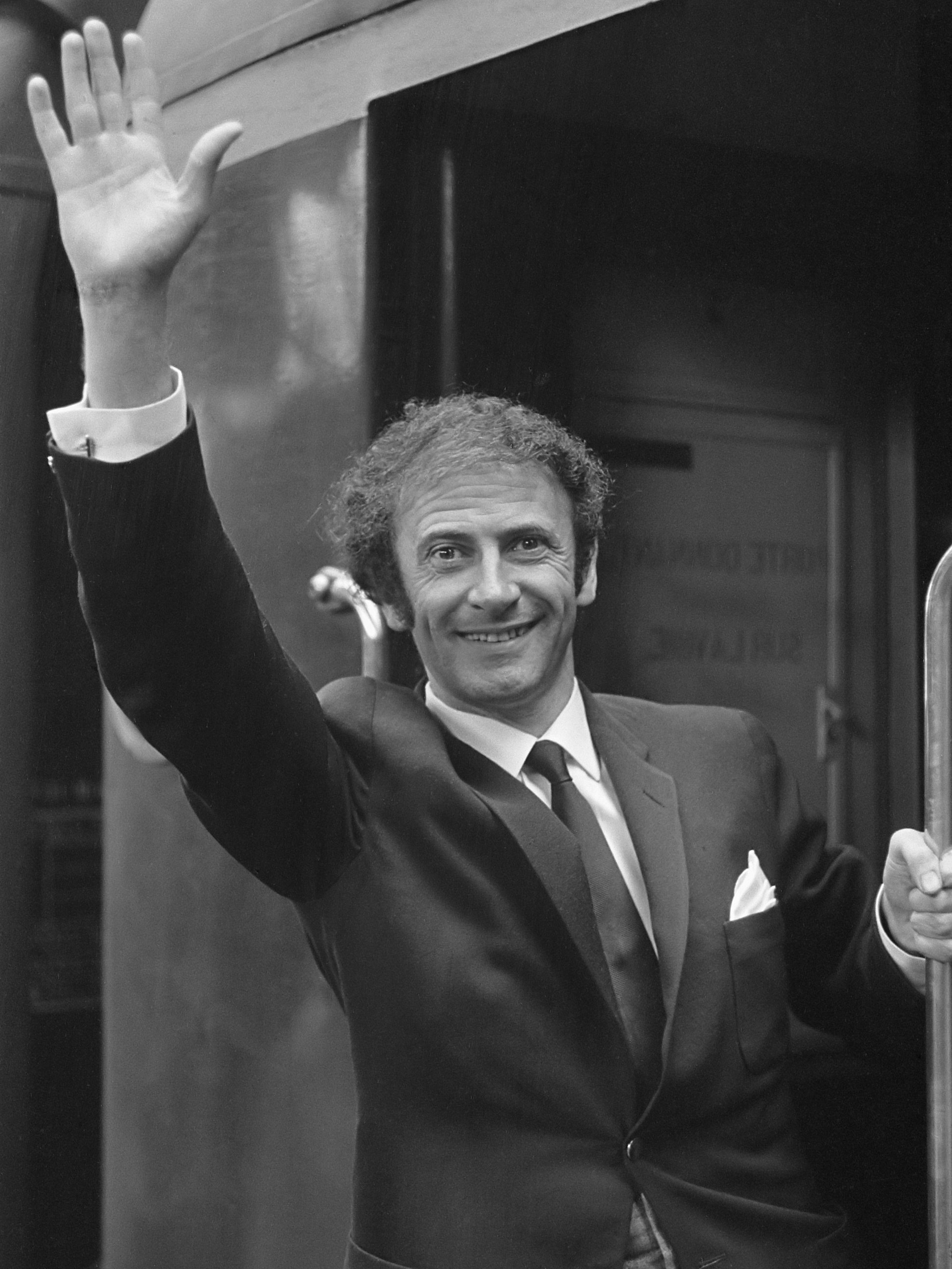
Marceau in 1962

As an author, Marceau published two books for children, the Marcel Marceau Alphabet Book and the Marcel Marceau Counting Book, and poetry and illustrations, including La ballade de Paris et du Monde (The Ballad of Paris and the World), an art book which he wrote in 1966, and The Story of Bip, written and illustrated by Marceau and published by Harper and Row. In 1974, he posed for artist Kenneth Hari and worked on paintings and drawings that resulted in a book and artwork in a number of museum collections. In 1982, Le Troisième Œil, (The Third Eye), his collection of ten original lithographs, was published in Paris with an accompanying text by Marceau. Belfond of Paris published Pimporello in 1987. In 2001, a new photo book for children titled Bip in a Book, published by Stewart, Tabori & Chang, appeared in bookstores in the U.S., France, and Australia.

In 1969, Marcel Marceau opened his first school, École Internationale de Mime, in the Théàtre de la Musique in Paris. The school was open for two years with fencing, acrobatics, ballet, and five teachers of mime. In 1978, Marceau established his school, École Internationale de Mimodrame de Paris, Marcel Marceau (International School of Mimodrame of Paris, Marcel Marceau). In 1996, he established the Marceau Foundation to promote mime in the United States.

In 1995, pop megastar Michael Jackson, who had been friends with Marceau for nearly 20 years, planned a concert together with him for HBO, but the concert was canceled after Jackson was hospitalized for exhaustion during rehearsals. Jackson, during an interview, said that he had always been "in awe" at Marceau's skill as a performer:

He was a great guy. I used to go see Marcel Marceau all of the time, before Off the Wall. I used to sneak in and sit in the audience and watch how he would defy the laws of gravity like he was stepping on air. I would take some of those things and include it into rhythm and dance when I move.

In 2000, Marceau brought his mime company to New York City to present The Bowler Hat, which had previously been performed in Paris, London, Tokyo, Taipei, Caracas, Santo Domingo, Valencia, and Munich. Beginning in 1999, he returned to New York and San Francisco with his solo show after a 15-year absence. He later performed at venues including Ford’s Theatre in Washington, D.C., the American Repertory Theater in Cambridge, Massachusetts, and the Geffen Playhouse in Los Angeles.

Marceau's new total company production Les Contes Fantastiques (Fantasy Tales) opened to great acclaim at the Théâtre Antoine in Paris.

== Awards and honors ==
Marceau was made a commander of the Ordre des Arts et des Lettres, an Officer of the Légion d'honneur, and in 1978 he received the Médaille Vermeil de la Ville de Paris. The City of Paris awarded him a grant which enabled him to reopen his International School which offered a three-year curriculum. In November 1998, President Jacques Chirac made Marceau a grand officer of the Ordre national du Mérite.

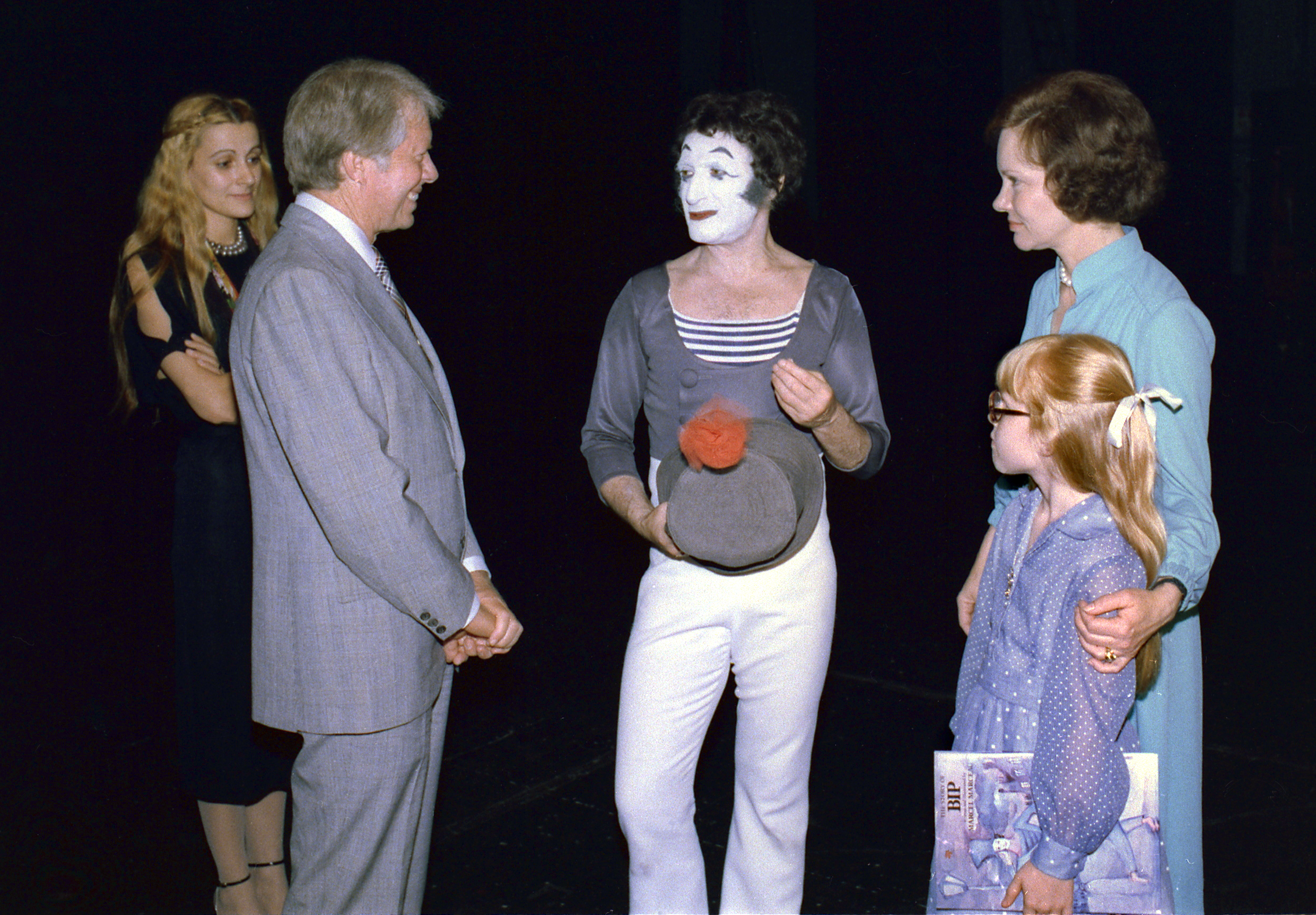
With U.S. President Jimmy Carter, Rosalynn Carter, and Amy Carter, 16 June 1977

Marceau was an elected member of the Academy of Fine Arts Berlin, the Academy of Fine Arts Munich, the Académie des Beaux-Arts of the Institut de France.

Marceau held honorary doctorates from Ohio State University, Linfield College, Princeton University and the University of Michigan. In April 2001, Marceau was awarded the Wallenberg Medal by the University of Michigan in recognition of his humanitarianism and acts of courage aiding Jewish people and other refugees during World War II.

In 1999 New York City declared 18 March "Marcel Marceau Day".

Marceau accepted the honor and responsibilities of serving as Goodwill Ambassador for the United Nations Second World Assembly on Aging, which took place in Madrid, Spain, in April 2002.

On 22 March 2023, Google celebrated his 100th birthday with a Google Doodle.

== Personal life ==
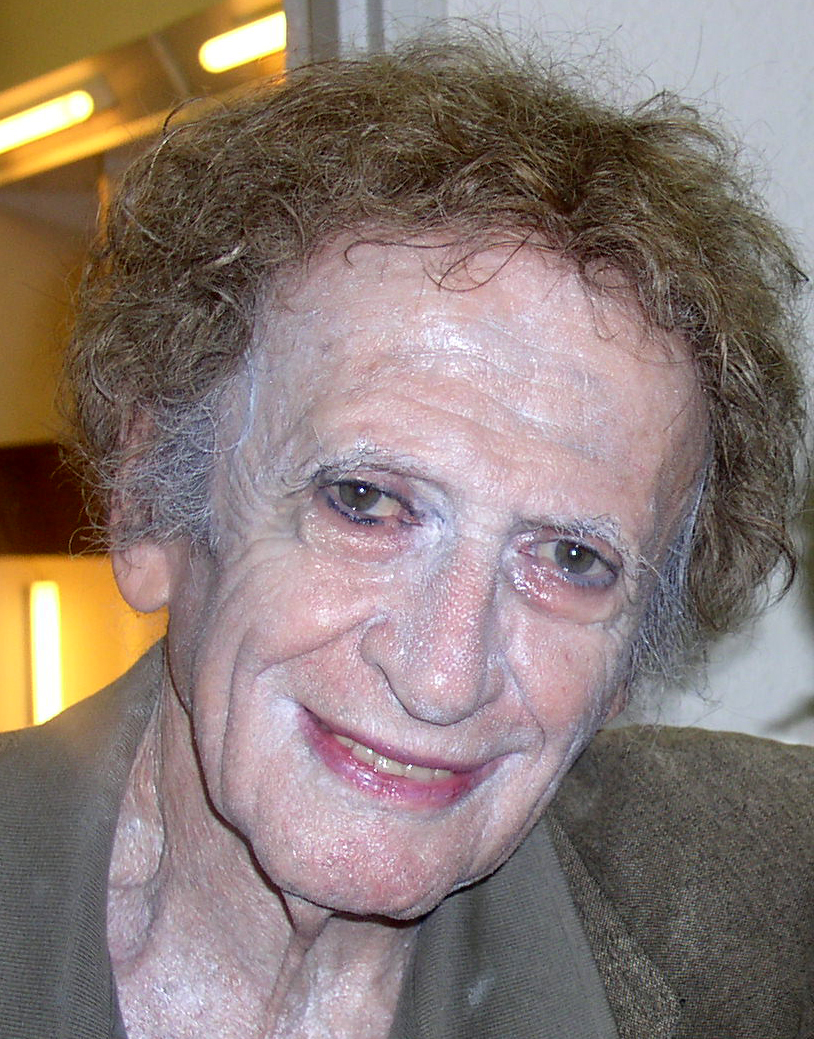
Marceau in 2004

Marceau was married three times: first to Huguette Mallette, with whom he had two sons, Michel and Baptiste, then, to Ella Jaroszewicz, with whom he had no children. His third wife was Anne Sicco, with whom he had two daughters, Camille and Aurélia.

Artist and fellow mime Paulette Frankl released a memoir in August 2014 about her decades-long relationship with Marceau, Marcel & Me: A Memoir of Love, Lust, and Illusion.

== Death ==
Marceau died in a retirement home in Cahors, France, on 22 September 2007 at the age of 84. At his burial ceremony, the second movement of Mozart's Piano Concerto No. 21 (which Marceau long used as an accompaniment for an elegant mime routine) was played, as was the sarabande of Bach's Cello Suite No. 5. Marceau was interred at the Père Lachaise Cemetery in Paris.

== Recordings, publications, and film ==
In the recorded conversation Marcel Marceau Speaks, recorded in English with the writer William Fifield, Marcel Marceau traced the history of mime and discussed his own role in its renewed popularity. Calling mime the art of "making the invisible visible," he shared how he developed his signature character, Bip.

Marceau wrote and illustrated the story Pimporello, which was adapted and edited by Robert Hammond and published in 1991. He also wrote the preface to French high wire artist Philippe Petit's 1985 book, On The High Wire., and the foreword to Stefan Niedziałkowski's and Jonathan Winslow's 1993 book, Beyond the Word—the World of Mime.

Jan Dalman, the Dutch husband of Australian choreographer and dancer Elizabeth Cameron Dalman, was one of few photographers who was permitted by Marceau to take photographs of him from the stage while he was performing on his Australian tour. During his later life, Dalman carefully chose a selection of his best photos of the mime, wishing to publish a book to honour Marceau. After Jan's death, Elizabeth and their son Andreas Dalman published his photographs in a volume titled Out of silence – Marcel Marceau. The text appears in English and in French translation.

The 2020 film Resistance is a biographical film directed by directed by Jonathan Jakubowicz, inspired by Marceau's life, in which Jesse Eisenberg plays Marceau.

Marceau appeared in several films, including:

=== Filmography ===
Year	Title	Role	Notes
1946	La Bague		short film by Alain Resnais
1954	Pantomimes		short film by Paul Paviot
1959	Die schöne Lügnerin	Napoleon im Kabarett	French/German production
1965	Marcel Marceau, le Baladin du silence		film by Dominique Delouche
1967	His name was Robert	cameo	film by Ilya Olshvanger
1968	Barbarella	Professor Ping	The first time Marceau's voice is heard on film
1974	Shanks	Malcolm Shanks / Old Walker	Shanks is deaf-mute. Walker speaks little and dies early in the film. Marceau also choreographed the puppet-like movements in the film.
1976	Silent Movie	Marcel Marceau	Marceau pronounces just one word, "non" – the only spoken word in the entire film
1979	Les Îles	Director of the IGN	
1994	Marcel Marceau ou le poids de l'âme		by Marcel Marceau, Alain Dhénaut, Jean-Pierre Burgaud / La Sept Vidéo

== Selected live performances ==
- 1946: Baptiste by Jacques Prévert & Joseph Kosma, mise en scène Jean-Louis Barrault, Théâtre Marigny
- 1947: Baptiste by Jacques Prévert & Joseph Kosma, mise en scène Jean-Louis Barrault, Théâtre des Célestins
- 1947: La Fontaine de jouvence de Boris Kochno, mise en scène Jean-Louis Barrault, Théâtre Marigny
- 1947: Le Procès inspired by Franz Kafka, mise en scène Jean-Louis Barrault, Théâtre Marigny
- 1947: Spectacle Marcel Marceau, Théâtre de Poche Montparnasse
- 1948: L'État de siège (The State of Siege) by Albert Camus, mise en scène Jean-Louis Barrault, Théâtre Marigny
- 1949: Nouvelles Pantomimes burlesques and Un mimodrame by Marcel Marceau, mise en scène Marcel Marceau, Théâtre de Poche Montparnasse
- 1950: Les Pantomimes de Bip and Mort avant l'aube, Studio des Champs-Élysées
- 1951: Le Manteau – Moriana et Galvan by Nikolai Gogol and Alexandre Arnoux, mise en scène Marcel Marceau, Studio des Champs-Élysées
- 1952: Le Pierrot de Montmartre by Marcel Marceau, Théâtre Sarah Bernhardt
- 1953: Les Trois Perruques – Un soir aux Funambules by Marcel Marceau, Comédie des Champs-Élysées
- 1956: Loup de Tsu Ku Mi – Mont de Piété – 14 Juillet de Marcel Marceau, Théâtre de l'Ambigu
- 1958: Le Petit Cirque and Les Matadors by Marcel Marceau, Théâtre de l'Ambigu
- 1964: Don Juan by Marcel Marceau, Théâtre de l'Ambigu
- 1972: Le Vagabond des étoiles by Marcel Marceau, Théâtre des Champs-Élysées
- 1974: Pantomimes by Marcel Marceau, USA Tour
- 1978: Mimodrame by Marcel Marceau, Théâtre de la Porte-Saint-Martin
- 1997: Le Chapeau Melon by Marcel Marceau, Espace Cardin
- 1997: Déserts ou les 7 rêves de Sarah, mise en scène Anne Sicco, Scène Nationale d'Albi
- 2003: Contes fantastiques by Marcel Marceau, Théâtre Antoine
