= Yvonne Hagnauer =

French Righteous Among the Nations (1898–1985)

Yvonne Hagnauer (9 September 1898 – 1 November 1985) was a French hero, educator and Righteous among the Nations. Among the many people she saved was a young Marcel Marceau.

== Biography ==
Yvonne Eugénie Pauline Even was born on September 9, 1898, in Paris, to a family of Breton origin living in the Paris suburb of Les Pavillons-sous-Bois. Her father was a traveling salesman. A graduate of the École Normale Supérieure, she became a teacher around 1918. She held a general teaching certificate in history, literature, and English, and was certified by the University of Cambridge (English). On December 28, 1925, she married Roger Hagnauer in Pavillons-sous-Bois, himself a teacher and humanist activist and anti-Stalinist communist. She became an English teacher at the École Supérieure de Commerce de Paris.

A feminist and trade unionist, she was active in the national teachers' union (SNI, affiliated with the CGT). She helped establish the Centers for Training in Active Teaching Methods (which became CEMEA after 1945). She was one of the organizers of the International Education Congress in 1937. Co-founder of the Women's League for Peace in September 1938, she signed Louis Lecoin Manifesto for Peace in 1939 and was dismissed from public education.

She ran the Charny colony -- an historical summer camp (colonie de vacances) held in 1941 -- and then, in 1941, founded the Maison d'enfants de Sèvres (Sèvres Children's Home) with her husband Roger Hagnauer. The primary aim of the home was to take in orphaned children, both Christian and Jewish, or those who had been abandoned by their families as a result of the widespread devastation caused by World War II. Then, gradually, many Jewish children were also entrusted to Yvonne Hagnauer for protection following the mass deportations.

One aspect of the teaching methods used there is to give children responsibilities from an early age to teach them the value of work. More generally, the teaching methods, based on those of Ovide Decroly, aim to stimulate children's interest, responsibility, creativity, and the need to work hard.

Yvonne Hagnauer also gave shelter to Jewish adults by finding them jobs (as teachers, counselors, and laborers) under assumed names, as was the case for the future Marcel Marceau.

This new New Education Movement to operate under the leadership of Yvonne Hagnauer until 1970.

A member of a French Resistance network, she was designated on September 10, 1974 as “Righteous Among the Nations.”
