= Patrick Lung =

Hong Kong film director, actor, screenwriter, and film producer

- Chinese: 龍剛
- Born: Chinese: 龍乾耀; 8 February 1934; British Hong Kong
- Died: 2 September 2014 (aged 80); Staten Island, New York City, U.S.
- Education: New York University
- Occupations: Film director; screenwriter; producer; actor
- Children: 6
- Awards: "Best Director" at 19th Asia-Pacific Film Festival for The Call Girls

Chinese name
- Traditional Chinese: 龍剛
- Simplified Chinese: 龙刚
Transcriptions
Standard Mandarin
- Hanyu Pinyin: Lóng Gāng
Yue: Cantonese
- Hong Kong Romanisation: Lung Kong

Patrick Lung (8 February 1934 – 2 September 2014), also known as Lung Kong or Patrick Lung Kong, was a film director from Hong Kong. Before working in the film industry, he worked in the stock market. In the late 1950s, he was invited to join Shaw Brothers Studio to learn filmmaking and become a film director. In the 1970s, he was awarded "Best Director" award at the 19th Asia-Pacific Film Festival for directing The Call Girls.

In August 2014, the Museum of the Moving Image held an exhibition dedicated to Lung and his films.

== Filmography ==
=== Films ===
This is a partial list of films.

- 1959 Young Rock – Au Kim Wah
- 1966 Prince of Broadcasters – Writer, director
- 1967 The Story of a Discharged Prisoner – Inspector Lui. Also as writer, director.
- 1967 Man from Interpol
- 1968 The Window – Director.
- 1969 Teddy Girls – Lai Shing. Director, screenwriter.
- 1970 Yesterday, Today, Tomorrow – Director, screenwriter, actor.
- 1971 My Beloved – Director.
- 1972 Pei Shih – Director.
- 1973 The Call Girls – Director.
- 1974 Hiroshima 28 – Lee Ko-Chiang. Director, screenwriter.
- 1976 Laugh In – Director.
- 1976 Nina – Director.
- 1977 Mitra – Director.
- 1979 The Fairy, the Ghost and Ah Chung – Director.

== Awards ==
- 2014 Lifetime Achievement Award. Presented at New York Asian Film Festival. August 15, 2014.
