= Jungle Jim (film) =

1948 film by William A. Berke

- Film poster for the 1st Jungle Jim film
- Directed by: William Berke
- Screenplay by: Carroll Young
- Story by: Carroll Young
- Based on: Jungle Jim comic strip 1934-1954 by Alex Raymond
- Produced by: Sam Katzman
- Starring: Johnny Weissmuller
- Cinematography: Lester White
- Edited by: Aaron Stell
- Color process: Black and white
- Production company: King Features Syndicate
- Distributed by: Columbia Pictures
- Release date: December 15, 1948
- Running time: 72 minutes
- Country: United States
- Language: English
- Budget: $350,000 (est.)

Jungle Jim is a 1948 American adventure film directed by William Berke and starring Johnny Weissmuller. It is based on Alex Raymond's Jungle Jim comic strip and was distributed by Columbia Pictures. It is the first picture in the Jungle Jim series that consists of 16 films originally released between 1948 and 1955.

In 1954, Columbia turned over its Jungle Jim rights to its television subsidiary, and in the last three films of the motion picture series Weissmuller's character was referred to as "Johnny Weissmuller" instead of Jungle Jim (but they are still regarded by fans as part of the "Jungle Jim" film series).

Devil Goddess (1955) is the last entry in the series, after which Weissmuller starred in the Jungle Jim TV series.

== Plot ==
After attempting in vain to save a man from being mauled to death by a leopard, Jungle Jim discovers a vial containing an unknown potion. He takes it to district commissioner Marsden, who identifies it as being from the hidden temple of Zimbalu and brings in Dr. Hilary Parker to head up an expedition with Jim as her guide.

An opportunistic photographer, Bruce Edwards, follows as Dr. Parker seeks what she believes could be a miraculous breakthrough in medicine. Jim is more concerned that witch doctors use what's in the vial as a deadly poison. His trusty ally Kolu comes along and saves Jim when he is pushed off a cliff by Edwards. The favor is returned when Jim rescues Kolu from an attacking lion.

Accidents befall the expedition along the way, as Edwards ingratiates himself with the "devil doctors", only to later incur their wrath. The potion isn't the polio vaccine Hilary hoped it would be, but she expresses a willingness to work again with Jim in future adventures in the jungle.

== Cast ==
- Johnny Weissmuller as Jungle Jim
- Virginia Grey as Dr. Hilary Parker
- George Reeves as Bruce Edwards
- Lita Baron as Zia
- Rick Vallin as Kolu, Chief of The Masai
- Holmes Herbert as Commissioner Geoffrey Marsden

== Production ==
The Jungle Jim comics had already been turned into a radio series in 1935 and a film serial two years later.

Weissmuller had appeared in Tarzan movies since 1932 but in the late 1940s his contract with producer Sol Lesser was about to expire. In February 1948 producer Sam Katzman had signed a five-year deal with Johnny Weissmuller to make "jungle movies" starting with two films a year for two years where the budgets would be at least $350,000. Hedda Hopper reported that these would be an adaptation of the Jungle Jim or King of the Jungle comic strips. William Berke would direct the films.

Initially it was thought there was still a chance Weissmuller might continue as Tarzan as well, but by April 1948 Lex Barker had signed to take over that role and Katzman announced Weissmuller would make Jungle Jim.

Weissmuller dropped out of Tarzan in part because he had been putting on too much weight. Katzman had a penalty clause in his contract with the actor that insisted Weissmuller had to weigh in at 190 pounds or less, or be penalised $5,000 a pound up to ten pounds, or $50,000. The actor's fee was $75,000. "If he can't take it off by exercise he takes it off by worry", said Katzman.

Filming started on August 3 on the first "Jungle Jim" movie. Weissmuller would make two films a year for five years. Virginia Grey was cast as female lead shortly before filming commenced.

== Reception ==
The Los Angeles Times called it "pretty much formula stuff but most kids and some grownups will like it."

The New York Times said Weissmuller played "a fat, but physically fearless, and miraculously clever jungle guide... foiling witch doctors and white villains much as he's done of old" but added "it's not quite the same old Johnny. And that perceptible rubber tire which shows around his middle when he goes in swimming is not the only evidence of age. A heavy accretion of boredom is in his attitude... maybe it's too much dialogue."

Variety said "while filling its purpose satisfactorily for the kiddie field producers might have attracted a broader market had they given it more adult intent."

=== The 16 JUNGLE JIM Films (in order of release) ===
- Columbia Pictures produced a series of 16 Jungle Jim B-movies from 1948 to 1955, set in Africa and starring Johnny Weissmuller, who had gained fame playing Tarzan. In the last three of these movies, the name "Jungle Jim" was not used; the main character was instead referred to in the films as "Johnny Weissmuller", with Weissmuller essentially playing an idealized version of himself, much like the cowboy stars Roy Rogers and Gene Autry. This was because these three features were produced concurrently with a "Jungle Jim" TV series starring Weissmuller produced by Columbia's Screen Gems (see below) and only the TV series at that point had the rights to the brand "Jungle Jim." (The "Weissmuller" jungle character was otherwise indistinguishable from Jungle Jim, and the final three films are commonly referred to as "Jungle Jim movies" though that is not technically accurate.
1. Jungle Jim (1948)
2. The Lost Tribe (1949)
3. Mark of the Gorilla (1950)
4. Captive Girl (1950) co-starred Buster Crabbe
5. Pygmy Island (1950)
6. Fury of the Congo (1951)
7. Jungle Manhunt (1951)
8. Jungle Jim in the Forbidden Land (1952)
9. Voodoo Tiger (1952)
10. Savage Mutiny (1953)
11. Valley of Head Hunters (1953)
12. Killer Ape (1953)
13. Jungle Man-Eaters (1954)
14. Cannibal Attack (1954)
15. Jungle Moon Men (1955)
16. Devil Goddess (1955)

== See also ==
- Jungle Jim (disambiguation)
- Jungle Jim (serial)
- Jungle Jim (TV series)
