= Jungle Jim (disambiguation) =

Jungle Jim is a 1934–1954 American newspaper comic strip; the phrase may also refer to works adapted from the comic strip:

Jungle Jim may also refer to:

== Media ==
- Jungle Jim (serial), a 1937 movie serial, starring Grant Withers
- Jungle Jim (film), a 1948 film, followed by several sequels, starring Johnny Weissmuller
- Jungle Jim (TV series), a syndicated series that premiered in 1955, also starring Weissmuller

== People ==
People with the nickname include:

- Jim Hunter (skier) (born 1953), Canadian alpine ski racer
- Jim Liberman (1945–1977), American drag racer
- Jim Loscutoff (1930–2015), American basketball player
- Jim Rivera (1921–2017), American baseball player
- Jim Steele (wrestler), professional wrestler

== Other uses ==
- 1st Air Commando Group, originally the 4400th CCTS and Air Commandos, a unit of the U.S. Air Force nicknamed the "Jungle Jims"
- Jungle Jim's International Market, a specialty supermarket in Fairfield, Ohio, U.S.
- Jungle Jim (The Unfunnies), a fictional character

== See also ==
- Jungle gym, a piece of playground equipment
