= Carroll Young =

American screenwriter

Carroll Young (1908–1992) was an American screenwriter who specialised in jungle stories. He used to work in publicity then went to work for Sol Lesser who produced Tarzan movies. Young became one of the regular writers of the films for the next decade. He later wrote Jungle Jim movies.

== Filmography ==
- Tarzan Triumphs (1943)
- Tarzan's Desert Mystery (1943)
- Tarzan and the Leopard Woman (1946)
- Tarzan and the Mermaids (1948)
- Jungle Jim (1948)
- Mark of the Gorilla (1950)
- Captive Girl (1950)
- Bomba and the Hidden City (1950)
- Pygmy Island (1950)
- Fury of the Congo (1951)
- Lost Continent (1951)
- Overland Telegraph (1951)
- The Jungle (1952)
- Tarzan and the She Devil (1953)
- Killer Ape (1953)
- Cannibal Attack (1954)
- She Devil (1957)
- The Deerslayer (1957)
- Machete (1958)
