= Paul Marion (actor) =

American actor (1915–2011)

- Born: Morris Weinraub; September 12, 1915; New York City, New York, U.S.
- Died: September 8, 2011 (aged 95); Danbury, Connecticut, U.S.
- Occupation: Actor
- Years active: 1937–1955
- Spouse(s): Isabel Jewell (m. 1941; div. 1944); Elinor Brand (m. 1954; div. 1982)
- Children: 4
- Military career
- Allegiance: United States
- Branch: U.S. Army
- Service years: 1941–1942
- Rank: Private
- Service number: 32172108
- Conflicts: World War II: Battle of the Coral Sea

Morris Weinraub (September 12, 1915 – September 8, 2011), known professionally as Paul Marion (a stage name evidently drawn from the respective given names of his birth- and step-mother), was an American actor, notable for roles in To Have and Have Not (1944), Mysterious Doctor Satan and Captain Midnight.

== Early life and career ==
Born Morris Weinraub on September 12, 1915, in the Bronx, New York, Marion was the son of Austrian-Jewish immigrants Pauline and William Weinraub.

Marion's Broadway credits include The Eternal Road (1937), Soliloquy (1938), Quiet, Please! (1940), and My Sister Eileen (1940).

In November 1942, the Hollywood Reporter published the recollections of U.S. Army Private Pacific Paul Marion, regarding his 1-year-plus tour of duty, mostly in the Pacific, recently ended due to illness.

Stationed on an obscure island in the New Hebrides, in the Coral Sea, the men had no recreational facilities for two month—no lights, no reading matter. Then the Red Cross shipped in a 16mm film unit, and did we appreciate seeing movies again! Films were screened in the open air, in the hospital compound, and natives as well as soldiers clustered aroung to view these visualizations of our American way of life. Musicals, particularly those of Bing Crosby, were our favorites, and with the exception of letters from our folks, did more to give us the feeling of home than anything else.

Marion acted on film from the late 1930s to 1955's Devil Goddess, when he left acting to become an agent.

In 1950, Daily Variety reported that the American Academy of Dramatic Arts's Academy Repertory Company had formed a stock company specifically for television, its participants, apart fr including Dee Englebach, Sterling Holloway, Pat O'Brien, Allen Jenkins, Fred Clark, Marcella Cisney, Frank Crenshaw, Lucius Cook, Richard Bartell, Sandra Gould, David Leonard, George Meeker, Tom Powers, William Tracy, Lewis Wilson, and Charles Wagenheim.

== Personal life and death ==
On October 10, 1941, Marion married actress Isabel Jewell In Atlantic City, New Jersey. They were divorced on May 12, 1944. In 1952, he married Elinor Brand, and they divorced in 1984. They had four children, at least one of whom, post-infant/pre-toddler Philip Marion, would, in March 1954, become the subject of stories by both Daily Variety and Hollywood Reporter, stating that he had "literally stumbled into what may be a pic career.

[O]ver the weekend, [the m]oppet accompanied his father to Berman's Costumers for a fitting, and while roaming about, stumbled and fell. He was picked up by Dave Berman, who remembered producer Tony Leader was searching for a child just learning to walk, for a top role in 'A Matter of Blood,' telepic in the 'Lifeline' series. Leader was contacted, saw the youngster and signed him immediately.

It does not appear that the envisioned NBC series ever materialized.

On September 8, 2011, Marion died in Los Angeles, California, at age 95.

== Selected filmography ==
- In Old Caliente (1939) - Carlos Vargas
- Zorro's Fighting Legion (1939, Serial) - Kala [Ch. 10-12]
- Drums of Fu Manchu (1940, Serial) - Si-Fan Messenger at Hotel [Ch.7] (uncredited)
- Covered Wagon Days (1940) - Carlos Rinaldo
- Meet the Wildcat (1940) - Mexican Teenager (uncredited)
- Mysterious Doctor Satan (1940, Serial) - Corbay [Ch. 1]
- Secret Service in Darkest Africa (1943, Serial) - Abdul [Chs. 12-13] (uncredited)
- Phantom of the Opera (1943) - Desjardines
- The Cross of Lorraine (1943) - André (uncredited)
- The Ghost Ship (1943) - Peter - the Greek (uncredited)
- The Phantom (1943, Serial) - Rocco (uncredited)
- Captain America (1944, Serial) - Morgue Wagon Hijacker #1 [Chs. 9, 11] (uncredited)
- Mademoiselle Fifi (1944) - Devoir (uncredited)
- To Have and Have Not (1944) - Beauclere - Gaullist (uncredited)
- Captain Eddie (1945) - (uncredited)
- The Catman of Paris (1946) - Jules
- Gallant Journey (1946) - Tony Donardo (uncredited)
- So Dark the Night (1946) - Leon Achard
- Arch of Triumph (1948) - Anesthetist (uncredited)
- Devil's Cargo (1948) - Ramon Delgado
- The Loves of Carmen (1948) - Dragoon Sergeant (uncredited)
- The Gallant Blade (1948) - Captain (uncredited)
- The Lost Tribe (1949) - Chot
- The Undercover Man (1949) - Hoodlum (uncredited)
- We Were Strangers (1949) - Truck Driver (uncredited)
- The Secret of St. Ives (1949) - Amiot
- Flaming Fury (1949) - Sam Polacheck
- Sword in the Desert (1949) - Jeno
- The Devil's Henchman (1949) - Bill Falls
- Border Incident (1949) - One-Armed Man (uncredited)
- And Baby Makes Three (1949) - Phillips - Chauffeur (scenes deleted)
- Side Street (1950) - Dave (uncredited)
- Harbor of Missing Men (1950) - Philip Corcoris
- The Capture (1950) - Station Agent (uncredited)
- Fortunes of Captain Blood (1950) - Lieutenant (uncredited)
- Lonely Heart Bandits (1950) - Angelo (uncredited)
- Raiders of Tomahawk Creek (1950) - Chief Flying Arrow
- Last of the Buccaneers (1950) - Jose Cabrillo (uncredited)
- Counterspy Meets Scotland Yard (1950) - Paul Heisl - a Thug
- The Bandit Queen (1950) - Manuel
- The Flying Missile (1950) - Co-Pilot (uncredited)
- Born Yesterday (1950) - Interpreter (uncredited)
- Fury of the Congo (1951) - Raadi
- Flame of Stamboul (1951) - Ahmed Raschin (uncredited)
- Sirocco (1951) - Officer (uncredited)
- Savage Drums (1951) - Rata Tairu
- Mask of the Avenger (1951) - Coldardi's Sergeant (uncredited)
- Hot Lead (1951) - Dakota - Henchman
- The Family Secret (1951) - Reporter (uncredited)
- Ten Tall Men (1951) - Eijah
- Harem Girl (1952) - Majeed
- The Fighter (1952) - Rivas
- The Sniper (1952) - Al (uncredited)
- Sound Off (1952) - Range Officer (uncredited)
- Last Train from Bombay (1952) - Hotel Clerk (uncredited)
- Hellgate (1952)
- The Adventures of Superman (1952, Episode: "The Birthday Letter") - Herman Cusak
- The Prisoner of Zenda (1952) - Uhlan Guard at Hunting Lodge (uncredited)
- The Bad and the Beautiful (1952) - Spanish Actor in Screen Test (uncredited)
- Savage Mutiny (1953) - Lutembi
- Fort Vengeance (1953) - Eagle Heart
- Scared Stiff (1953) - Ramon Cariso / Francisco Cariso
- Safari Drums (1953) - Steve
- Arrowhead (1953) - Kuni (uncredited)
- Appointment in Honduras (1953) - Wounded Soldier (uncredited)
- Prisoners of the Casbah (1953) - Arab Dog (uncredited)
- Killer Ape (1953) - Mahara
- King Richard and the Crusaders (1954) - Arab Falconer (uncredited)
- The Adventures of Hajji Baba (1954) - Messenger (uncredited)
- Sabaka (1954) - Kumar
- The Silver Chalice (1954) - Cameleer (uncredited)
- Green Fire (1954) - Roberto
- Bowery to Bagdad (1955) - Abdul
- Pirates of Tripoli (1955) - Palace Guard (uncredited)
- A Bullet for Joey (1955) - Detective Posing as Gardener (uncredited)
- Shotgun (1955) - Delgadito
- Hell's Island (1955) - Juke Box Pitchman (uncredited)
- The Adventures of Captain Africa (1955, Serial) - Abdul el Hamid
- Abbott and Costello Meet the Mummy (1955) - Native (scenes deleted)
- Kiss of Fire (1955) - Soldier (uncredited)
- Devil Goddess (1955) - Kimba the ape
