= Max Palmer =

American professional wrestler and actor (1927–1984)

Personal information
- Born: Max Edmund Palmer; November 27, 1927 Pontotoc, Mississippi, U.S.
- Died: May 17, 1984 (aged 56) St. Louis, Missouri, U.S.

Professional wrestling career
- Ring name: Paul Bunyan
- Billed height: 8 ft 2 in (249 cm)
- Billed weight: 499 lb (226 kg)
- Billed from: Arnold, Missouri
- Debut: 1955
- Retired: 1960

Max Edmund Palmer (November 27, 1927 – May 7, 1984) was an American actor and professional wrestler. Known for his great height and his ring name Paul Bunyan, in 2014 he was described as the second tallest professional wrestler in history.

== Career ==
After high school Palmer left Mississippi to play with the professional basketball team Rochester Royals. After basketball Palmer went back to Mississippi only to work odd jobs working his way to Hollywood to get into acting. Palmer was discovered by an ex-Chicago newspaper man named Fritz Blocki. Palmer's first appearance on film was on the Dean Martin/Jerry Lewis Comedy Hour. Palmer's acting career spanned from 1952 to 1954. He starred in such movies as Invaders from Mars and Killer Ape with Johnny Weissmuller. He also guested variety shows such as Dean Martin/Jerry Lewis Comedy Hour, The Spade Cooley Show, and The Jimmy Durante Show.

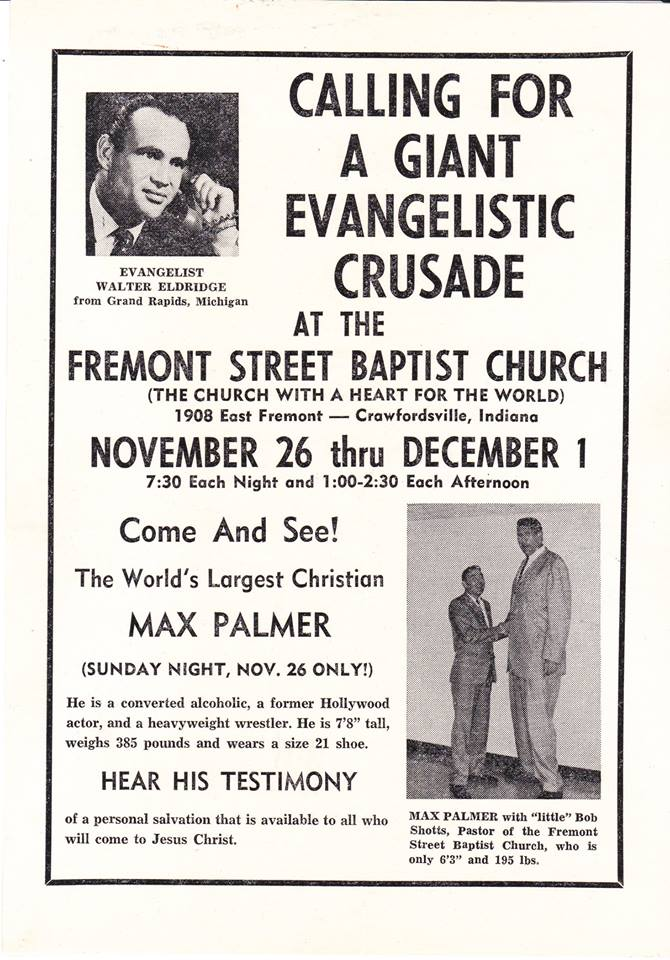
Flyer for a Baptist crusade including Max Palmer

After he left acting, Palmer became a professional wrestler in Salt Lake City, Utah. He was billed as "Paul Bunyan". He became an evangelist in 1963. He preached all over the United States, calling himself "Goliath for Christ". He preached until his death in 1984 from heart disease.

== Personal life ==
Palmer was born in Pontotoc, Mississippi. In May 1975, Palmer married a woman, Betty, and they remained married until his death. When measured for his coffin, he measured 8 feet 2 inches (2.49 m) and needed a 9-foot (2.7 m) coffin. Palmer is buried in Randolph, Mississippi, near Pontotoc, Mississippi at Carey Springs Baptist Church.

== Filmography ==
Year	Title	Role	Notes
1952	The Sniper	Chadwick	Uncredited
1953	Invaders from Mars	Mutant Carrying Dr. Blake to 'Intelligence'	Uncredited
1953	Killer Ape	Man Ape	
1974	Stone		(final film role)
