= Devil Goddess =

1955 American film directed by Spencer Gordon Bennet

- Theatrical release poster
- Directed by: Spencer G. Bennet
- Screenplay by: George H. Plympton
- Story by: Dwight Babcock
- Based on: Jungle Jim; 1934-1954 comic strip by Don Moore and Alex Raymond
- Produced by: Sam Katzman
- Starring: Johnny Weissmuller; Angela Stevens
- Cinematography: Ira Morgan
- Edited by: Aaron Stell
- Music by: Mischa Bakaleinikoff
- Production company: Columbia Pictures
- Distributed by: Columbia Pictures
- Release date: October 1, 1955
- Running time: 68 minutes
- Country: United States
- Language: English

Devil Goddess is a 1955 American adventure film, the sixteenth and final film in a series of jungle-based adventures from Columbia Pictures starring Johnny Weissmuller, the first thirteen of which feature the comic strip character Jungle Jim. It is the last of three films featuring Weismuller as an idealized version of himself, clearly based on the Jungle Jim character. The film was produced by Sam Katzman and also features Ed Hinton, William Tannen and Angela Stevens. It was written by George H. Plympton from a story by Dwight Babcock.

The film centers on jungle roamer Weissmuller and his team racing against looters for a mystical treasure located in a demon-worshiping land.

== Plot ==
Adventure-seeker Johnny Weissmuller receives a request from Professor Carl Blakely to collaboratively rescue a certain Professor Dixon from the Mountain of Explosive Fire in Kirundi. Blakely's daughter Nora comes along. The Kirundi natives belong to a religious tribe worshipping a demon thought to control fire. Pious in nature, they are willing to sacrifice humans just to appease the fire demon, who in fact is Dixon. They are also known to possess mystical items, including a jewel-encrusted sabre.

Notorious looters Leopold and Nels Comstock, along with their criminal crew, are looking to steal the Kirundi folks' treasures. They arrive at the strange land the same time Johnny and Blakely do. Jim is tipped off by a contact that his lover Sarabna is next in line to be sacrificed by the natives. The brave explorer arrives in the nick of time, managing to halt the procession and at the same time finding Dixon. Meanwhile, the looters strike gold but are discovered and killed by the Caucasian-loathing tribesmen.

The Mountain of Explosive Fire, revealed to be an active volcano, erupts suddenly. Johnny evacuates the local people and flees to safety with Blakely, Sarabna, and the fire demon Dixon. In gratitude, the chief presents the team with their precious treasures. Dixon considers donating them to a museum.

== Cast ==
- Johnny Weissmuller as himself
- Angela Stevens as Nora Blakely
- Selmer Jackson as Professor Carl Blakeley
- William Tannen as Nels Comstock
- Frank Lackteen as Nkruma
- Vera Francis as Sarabina (credited as Vera M. Francis)
- Ed Hinton as Joseph Leopold
- Billy Griffith as Professor Ralph Dixon (credited as William M. Griffith)
- Kimba as Kimba the chimp

== Production ==
After production for Devil Goddess came to a finish, Weissmuller quit acting in feature films though he made appearances in The Phynx (1970) and Won Ton Ton, the Dog Who Saved Hollywood (1976).

Ira Morgan was cinematographer, and the set decorator was Sidney Clifford. Mischa Bakaleinikoff headed the musical direction, and Aaron Stell edited the film. Principal photography began on December 14, 1954, and ended on December 21, 1954.

Archived footage from preceding Jungle Jim films, including Mark of the Tiger (1950), Pygmy Island (1950), Voodoo Tiger (1952), Killer Ape (1953), and Savage Mutiny (1953), is featured in the film.

== Release ==
The film was officially released in the North American cinemas in October 1955.

== Reception ==
The Monthly Film Bulletin wrote: "The juvenile jungle formula as before, with an eruption or two thrown in as an added attraction. The producer's conception of African tribesmen appears increasingly bizarre: South Sea islanders seem to be the model, but the native heroine has a decidedly Burmese air."

Kine Weekly wrote: "The picture, strongly reinforced by stock shots and studio props, which include a cardboard gorilla, crowds the screen with wild men and animals, yet retains a sense of humour. Kimba, Weissmuller's chimp, is always at hand to turn a tough, not to say preposterous, situation into a laugh. Johnny (Jungle Jim) Weissmuller contributes a characteristic portrayal as himself, and Angela Stevens, attractive as Nora, and the rest also perform with all seriousness. The erupting volcano is quite something and brings the jamboree to a fitting close.

It was critiqued as a "silly jungle film" by the Motion Picture Herald.

Variety wrote: "There was a time, long ago, when the Tarzan pix and similar adventure yarns used to be fun. But the latest Sam Katzman entry, Devil Goddess, is a plodding, almost amateurish attempt at making a formula theme pay off. It uses a good deal of stock footage and relies beyond reason on thie ability of Kimba, the chimp, fo amuse by doing endless backflips. Obviously, it must pay for Katzman and Columbia to turn out these aquickies (this one's in sepia color), but it's hard to believe that there are adults around for this sort of hokum. Even on a small budget feature like this, they could have done better."

In evaluating the film in his 2012 book Columbia Pictures Movie Series, 1926—1955: The Harry Cohn Years, Gene Blottner dubbed Weissmuller's acting in the film as "lack-luster", concluding that it "all life is gone from the series with this entry".

== Bibliography ==
- Gene Blottner (2012). Columbia Pictures Movie Series, 1926—1955: The Harry Cohn Years. McFarland. ISBN 978-0-7864-3353-7.
- AFI Catalog of Motion Pictures Produced in the United States. University of California Press. 1971. ISBN 978-0-520-21521-4.

== See also ==
- List of American films of 1955
