= Jungle Jim (serial) =

- Directed by: Ford Beebe; Clifford Smith (as Cliff Smith)
- Screenplay by: Wyndham Gittens; Norman S. Hall; Ray Trampe
- Based on: Alex Raymond (comic strip by)
- Produced by: Ben Koenig; Henry MacRae
- Starring: Grant Withers; Betty Jane Rhodes; Raymond Hatton; Evelyn Brent; Harry Brandon
- Cinematography: Jerome Ash (as Jerry Ash)
- Edited by: Louis Sackin; Alvin Todd; Edward Todd
- Production company: Universal Pictures
- Distributed by: Universal Pictures
- Release date: January 18, 1937
- Running time: 12 chapters (232 minutes)
- Country: United States
- Language: English

Jungle Jim is a 1937 Universal serial film based on Jungle Jim, the comic strip by Alex Raymond. Grant Withers stars as Jungle Jim, with Henry Brandon portraying the villainous Cobra.

== Plot ==
Two safaris enter the African jungle intent on finding a white girl who is the heiress to a fortune. One safari, led by Jungle Jim, wants to make sure she gets the news that she is now a rich woman and escort her back to civilisation. The leaders of the other safari want to kill the girl so they can try to get hold of her inheritance themselves...

== Cast ==
- Grant Withers as Jungle Jim
- Betty Jane Rhodes as Joan
- Raymond Hatton as Malay Mike
- Evelyn Brent as Shanghai Lil
- Henry Brandon as The Cobra
- Bryant Washburn as Bruce Redmond
- Claude King as Territorial Consul Gilbert [Ch.1]
- Selmer Jackson as Attorney Tyler [Ch.1] (as Selmar Jackson)
- Al Bridge as Slade
- Paul Sutton as LaBat [Chs.1-6]
- Al Duvall as Kolu
- Frank Mayo as Tom Redmond [Ch.1]
- J.P. McGowan as Ship Captain J.S. Robinson [Ch.1]
- Frank McGlynn Jr. as Red Hallihan [Ch.1]

== Chapter titles ==
1. Into the Lion's Den
2. The Cobra Strikes
3. The Menacing Hand
4. The Killer's Trail
5. The Bridge of Terror
6. Drums of Doom
7. The Earth Trembles
8. The Killer Lion
9. The Devil Bird
10. Descending Doom
11. In the Cobra's Castle
12. The Last Safari

== See also ==
- Jungle Jim
- Jungle Jim (film) series
- Jungle Jim (TV series)
- List of film serials by year
- List of film serials by studio
- Congo Bill
- Bomba the Jungle Boy
- Ramar of the Jungle

Preceded by Ace Drummond (1936)	Universal Serial; Jungle Jim (1937)	Succeeded by Secret Agent X-9 (1937)
