= William Tannen =

American actor (1911–1976)

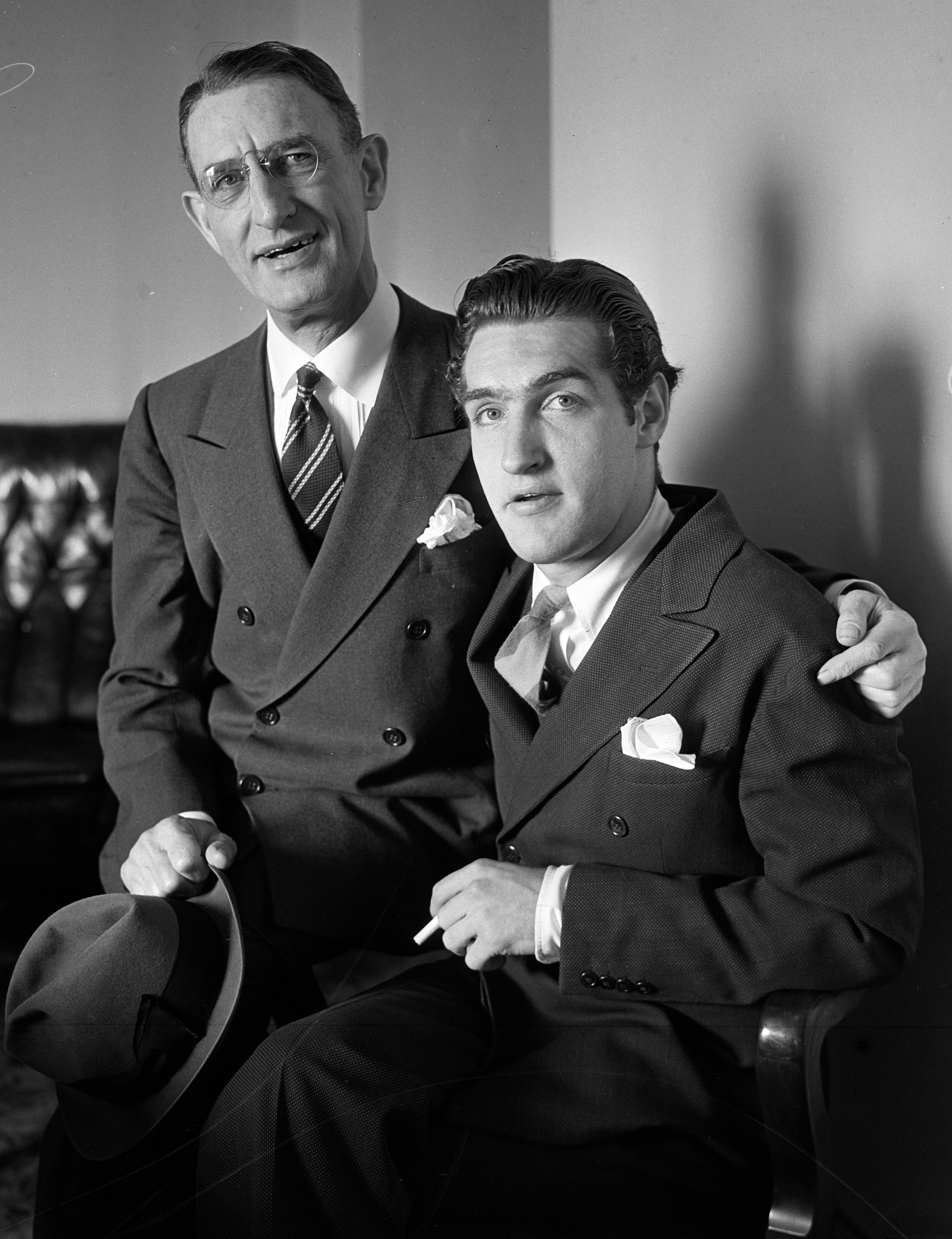
- Tannen (seated) with his father Julius
- Born: November 17, 1911; New York City, U.S.
- Died: December 2, 1976 (aged 65); Woodland Hills, Los Angeles, California, U.S.
- Occupation: Actor
- Years active: 1934–1970
- Television: The Life and Legend of Wyatt Earp
- Spouse: Donrue Leighton (m. 1935; div. 1936)
- Father: Julius Tannen

William Tannen (November 17, 1911 – December 2, 1976) was an American actor originally from New York City.

Tannen was the son of actor Julius Tannen. William Tannen became active in drama — both acting and writing — while a student at Lawrenceville School. He made his stage debut in a production of The Honor of the Family with the National Theatre troupe in Washington, D.C.

During the 1930s and 1940s, he was a Metro-Goldwyn-Mayer contract player. Among his earliest assignments were three appearances as the anonymous "MGM crime reporter" in the studio's Crime Does Not Pay short subjects. Tannen then advanced to membership in the studio's stock company, taking incidental roles in dozens of MGM's feature films. After the studio reduced its personnel in 1948, Tannen began freelancing at other studios but continued to receive assignments at MGM for the next decade. Television viewers of the 1950s recognized Tannen from his role of Deputy Hal Norton in 56 episodes of the ABC/Desilu western television series, The Life and Legend of Wyatt Earp (1956–58)

== Filmography ==
- The Band Plays On (1934) - Rosy Rosenberg
- Murder in the Fleet (1935) - Pee Wee Adams (uncredited)
- She Couldn't Take It (1935) - Cesar
- It's in the Air (1935) - Pilot (scenes deleted)
- Exclusive Story (1936) - Kent (uncredited)
- Tough Guy (1936) - Heming (uncredited)
- Small Town Girl (1936) - Tom (uncredited)
- Speed (1936) - Intern Attending Terry (uncredited)
- Fury (1936) - Governor's Aide (uncredited)
- Women Are Trouble (1936) - Reporter (uncredited)
- Crash Donovan (1936) - Tony
- When Love Is Young (1937) - Norman Crocker
- Rosalie (1937) - West Point Cadet (uncredited)
- The Devil's Party (1938) - Master of Ceremonies (uncredited)
- The Mad Miss Manton (1938) - Drunk Who Trips in Las Palmas Club (uncredited)
- Dramatic School (1938) - Student (uncredited)
- Stand Up and Fight (1939) - Lewis, Arnold's Henchman (uncredited)
- Four Girls in White (1939) - Doctor at Accident (uncredited)
- The Ice Follies of 1939 (1939) - Assistant Doorman (uncredited)
- Within the Law (1939) - Green's Clerk (uncredited)
- Broadway Serenade (1939) - Assistant Stage Manager (uncredited)
- The Hardys Ride High (1939) - Hotel Desk Clerk (uncredited)
- It's a Wonderful World (1939) - Actor as 'Soldier' (uncredited)
- 6,000 Enemies (1939) - Warden's Secretary (uncredited)
- Miracles for Sale (1939) - Radio Announcer (uncredited)
- Fast and Furious (1939) - Radio Announcer (uncredited)
- Another Thin Man (1939) - State Trooper (uncredited)
- The Secret of Dr. Kildare (1939) - Bates - Intern (uncredited)
- Broadway Melody of 1940 (1940) - Harmon (uncredited)
- Florian (1940) - Sergeant (uncredited)
- Phantom Raiders (1940) - Sailor (uncredited)
- The Mortal Storm (1940) - Nazi Clerk (uncredited)
- New Moon (1940) - Pierre
- Andy Hardy Meets Debutante (1940) - Mr. Franklin - Radio M.C. (voice, uncredited)
- Sporting Blood (1940) - Ted Milner (uncredited)
- I Love You Again (1940) - Hotel Clerk (uncredited)
- Boom Town (1940) - Hotel Desk Clerk #1 (uncredited)
- Wyoming (1940) - Sgt. Reynolds (uncredited)
- Sky Murder (1940) - Gus
- Gallant Sons (1940) - Spath, a Gangster (uncredited)
- Flight Command (1940) - Lieut. Freddy Townsend
- The Wild Man of Borneo (1941) - Actor in Film Scene (uncredited)
- The Trial of Mary Dugan (1941) - Driver (uncredited)
- The Penalty (1941) - State Trooper with Machine Gun (uncredited)
- Washington Melodrama (1941) - Airport Official (uncredited)
- Men of the Timberland (1941) - Cafe Patron (uncredited)
- I'll Wait for You (1941) - Driver
- Love Crazy (1941) - Sanitarium Attendant (uncredited)
- The Get-Away (1941) - Driver in Prison Break (uncredited)
- The Big Store (1941) - Fred Sutton
- Down in San Diego (1941) - Matt Herman
- Whistling in the Dark (1941) - Robert Graves
- Dr. Jekyll and Mr. Hyde (1941) - Intern Fenwick
- Two-Faced Woman (1941) - Missing Couple-Searching Skier (uncredited)
- Woman of the Year (1942) - Ellis
- Nazi Agent (1942) - Ludwig
- Mr. and Mrs. North (1942) - Train Agent (uncredited)
- Joe Smith, American (1942) - Eddie
- Dr. Kildare's Victory (1942) - Intern Morgan (uncredited)
- Ship Ahoy (1942) - Agent Flammer (uncredited)
- Fingers at the Window (1942) - Devlan
- Tarzan's New York Adventure (1942) - Mike, an Airport Clerk (uncredited)
- Pacific Rendezvous (1942) - Jasper Dean
- Grand Central Murder (1942) - Second Railroad Yardman (uncredited)
- Maisie Gets Her Man (1942) - Army Stage Manager (uncredited)
- The Affairs of Martha (1942) - Mechanic (uncredited)
- Cairo (1942) - Mechanic at the Pyramid / Soldier on Boat (uncredited)
- The War Against Mrs. Hadley (1942) - Corporal - War Department Guard (uncredited)
- For Me and My Gal (1942) - France Soldier-Driver (uncredited)
- Stand by for Action (1942) - Flag Lt. Dudley
- The Youngest Profession (1943) - Mr. Clark - Hotel Clerk (uncredited)
- Harrigan's Kid (1943) - Murphy's Aide (uncredited)
- Air Raid Wardens (1943) - Joseph
- Presenting Lily Mars (1943) - Eugene Shepherd (uncredited)
- Three Hearts for Julia (1943) - Reporter at Wharf (uncredited)
- Pilot No. 5 (1943) - American Soldier
- Salute to the Marines (1943) - Adjutant Reading Letter of Commendation (uncredited)
- Thousands Cheer (1943) - Prison Sergeant (uncredited)
- Meet the People (1944) - Mr. Quinn (uncredited)
- The Seventh Cross (1944) - Guard at Town Entrance (uncredited)
- The Canterville Ghost (1944) - Jordan
- Maisie Goes to Reno (1944) - Lead Man (uncredited)
- An American Romance (1944) - Auto Factory Driver (uncredited)
- This Man's Navy (1945) - Red (uncredited)
- Main Street After Dark (1945) - Wallet-Preparer (uncredited)
- Son of Lassie (1945) - German Soldier with Grenade (uncredited)
- Twice Blessed (1945) - Reporter at Airport (uncredited)
- Week-End at the Waldorf (1945) - Photographer (uncredited)
- Abbott and Costello in Hollywood (1945) - Casting Director / Dr. Caswell Snide (uncredited)
- Two Smart People (1946) - Clerk (uncredited)
- Boys' Ranch (1946) - Larry Stewart, Ranch Foreman (uncredited)
- Three Wise Fools (1946) - Prosecutor (uncredited)
- The Beginning or the End (1947) - Soldier at A-Bomb Test (uncredited)
- It Happened in Brooklyn (1947) - Captain (uncredited)
- Little Mister Jim (1947) - Sergeant (uncredited)
- High Barbaree (1947) - Officer of the Deck (uncredited)
- Dark Delusion (1947) - Walters the Chauffeur (uncredited)
- Cynthia (1947) - Dingle Clerk (uncredited)
- This Time for Keeps (1947) - Soldier (uncredited)
- Cass Timberlane (1947) - Chauffeur (uncredited)
- Killer McCoy (1947) - Thorne's Cameraman (uncredited)
- Alias a Gentleman (1948) - Interne (uncredited)
- B.F.'s Daughter (1948) - Warrant Officer Operating Radio (uncredited)
- Homecoming (1948) - Airline Attendant (uncredited)
- A Southern Yankee (1948) - Secret Service Agent (uncredited)
- Walk a Crooked Mile (1948) - FBI Chemist (uncredited)
- Luxury Liner (1948) - Ship Headwaiter (uncredited)
- An Innocent Affair (1948) - Gaylord
- The Three Musketeers (1948) - Traveler (uncredited)
- Command Decision (1948) - Officer (uncredited)
- Alaska Patrol (1949) - Dajek
- I Cheated the Law (1949) - Jack (uncredited)
- Take Me Out to the Ball Game (1949) - Reporter With Teddy Roosevelt (uncredited)
- The Barkleys of Broadway (1949) - Doorman at Theater (uncredited)
- Lust for Gold (1949) - Eager Fellow (uncredited)
- Any Number Can Play (1949) - Gambler (uncredited)
- Scene of the Crime (1949) - Detective (uncredited)
- The Gal Who Took the West (1949) - Lee Cowhand (uncredited)
- The Mysterious Desperado (1949) - Bart Barton
- Abandoned (1949) - Taxi Driver (uncredited)
- All the King's Men (1949) - Man in City Bar (uncredited)
- Riders of the Range (1950) - Policeman (uncredited)
- Father Is a Bachelor (1950) - George Willis (uncredited)
- Annie Get Your Gun (1950) - Barker (uncredited)
- Armored Car Robbery (1950) - Officer Johnson (uncredited)
- Three Little Words (1950) - Photographer (uncredited)
- David Harding, Counterspy (1950) - Radio Operator (uncredited)
- Convicted (1950) - Prison Guard (uncredited)
- Sunset in the West (1950) - John Kimball
- Chain Gang (1950) - Harry Cleaver (uncredited)
- Three Secrets (1950) - Bobby Lynch (uncredited)
- Dial 1119 (1950) - WKYL Radio Announcer (uncredited)
- Pygmy Island (1950) - Kruger
- The Flying Missile (1950) - Lieutenant (uncredited)
- Blue Blood (1951) - Sparks
- A Yank in Korea (1951) - Lt. Lewis
- Up Front (1951) - Doctor (uncredited)
- Insurance Investigator (1951) - 1st Hood
- Santa Fe (1951) - Henry, the Telegrapher (uncredited)
- I Was An American Spy (1951) - American Captain (uncredited)
- Roaring City (1951) - Ed Gannon
- New Mexico (1951) - Private Cheever
- Show Boat (1951) - Man with Julie (uncredited)
- The Strip (1951) - Arresting Detective (uncredited)
- Best of the Badmen (1951) - Bill - Adjutant (uncredited)
- Flame of Araby (1951) - Captain of Guards (uncredited)
- Jungle Jim in the Forbidden Land (1952) - 'Doc' Edwards
- Road Agent (1952) - Toll Gate Guard
- Jet Job (1952) - Col. Jamison
- Talk About a Stranger (1952) - Driggs (uncredited)
- Loan Shark (1952) - Rourke (uncredited)
- Scaramouche (1952) - Le Blanc (uncredited)
- Flat Top (1952) - Commander (uncredited)
- The Bad and the Beautiful (1952) - Reporter (uncredited)
- Jack McCall, Desperado (1953) - Spargo
- Man in the Dark (1953) - Slavin (uncredited)
- Code Two (1953) - Officer Kane (uncredited)
- Law and Order (1953) - Stranger (uncredited)
- Raiders of the Seven Seas (1953) - Ramon
- Run for the Hills (1953) - Charlie's Co-Worker (uncredited)
- Cruisin' Down the River (1953) - Poker Player (uncredited)
- I, the Jury (1953) - Johnny - Reporter (uncredited)
- Clipped Wings (1953) - FBI Agent Douglas (uncredited)
- 99 River Street (1953) - Director
- El Paso Stampede (1953) - Henchman Joe
- Dangerous Crossing (1953) - Ship's Officer (uncredited)
- Kiss Me Kate (1953) - Taxi Driver (uncredited)
- The Great Diamond Robbery (1954) - Interne (uncredited)
- The Golden Idol (1954) - Sergeant Reed
- Jesse James vs. the Daltons (1954) - Emmett Dalton
- Captain Kidd and the Slave Girl (1954) - Steve Castle
- The Law vs. Billy the Kid (1954) - Dave Rudabaugh
- Woman's World (1954) - Executive Reception Guest (uncredited)
- The Human Jungle (1954) - Cab driver-witness (uncredited)
- Sitting Bull (1954) - O'Connor
- The Bob Mathias Story (1954) - Olympics Reporter (uncredited)
- Jupiter's Darling (1955) - Roman Courier (uncredited)
- Dial Red O (1955) - Devon—Newspaper Reporter
- Devil Goddess (1955) - Nels Comstock
- Bobby Ware Is Missing (1955) - Helicopter Deputy (uncredited)
- Top Gun (1955) - Torchy - Henchman (uncredited)
- Blackjack Ketchum, Desperado (1956) - Dee Havalik
- The First Texan (1956) - President Jackson's Aide (uncredited)
- Three for Jamie Dawn (1956) - Mr. Douglas (uncredited)
- Gun Brothers (1956) - Rourke - Gang Member (uncredited)
- Friendly Persuasion (1956) - Supply Sergeant (uncredited)
- Last of the Badmen (1957) - Deputy (uncredited)
- Badlands of Montana (1957) - Second Outlaw (uncredited)
- Gun Duel in Durango (1957) - Larkin - Man Stealing Guns (uncredited)
- A Hatful of Rain (1957) - Celia's Supervisor (uncredited)
- The Hired Gun (1957) - Deputy-Guard (uncredited)
- The Tijuana Story (1957) - Miguel Fuentes (uncredited)
- Jailhouse Rock (1957) - Record Distributor (uncredited)
- Touch of Evil (1958) - Marcia Linnekar's Attorney (uncredited)
- Noose for a Gunman (1960) - Willetts
- The Quick Gun (1964) - Jake (uncredited)
- How to Murder Your Wife (1965) - Party Guest (uncredited)
- Fluffy (1965) - Professor (uncredited)
- The Great Sioux Massacre (1965) - Miner
- Batman (1966) - American Delegate (uncredited)
- The High Chaparral (1967) -Shadows on the Land, Bartender
- Panic in the City (1968) - Bill Rawlins
- Support Your Local Sheriff! (1969) - Man in Saloon (uncredited)

== Television ==
- Rawhide (1961) – George Frost in S3:E14, "Incident of the Big Blowout"
