= Jungle gym =

Playground equipment

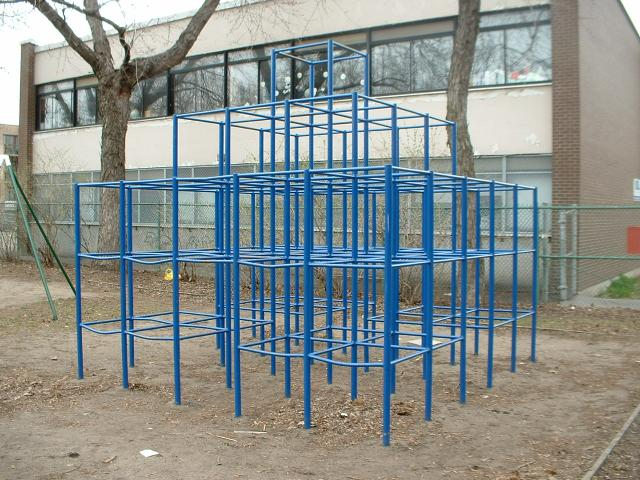
A traditional jungle gym

A jungle gym (called a climbing frame in British English) is a piece of playground equipment made of many pieces of material, such as metal pipes or ropes, on which participants can climb, hang, sit, and—in some configurations—slide. Monkey bars are a part of a jungle gym where a user, hanging in the air, swings between evenly spaced horizontal bars. The term "monkey bars" is sometimes used to refer to the entire jungle gym.

== History ==
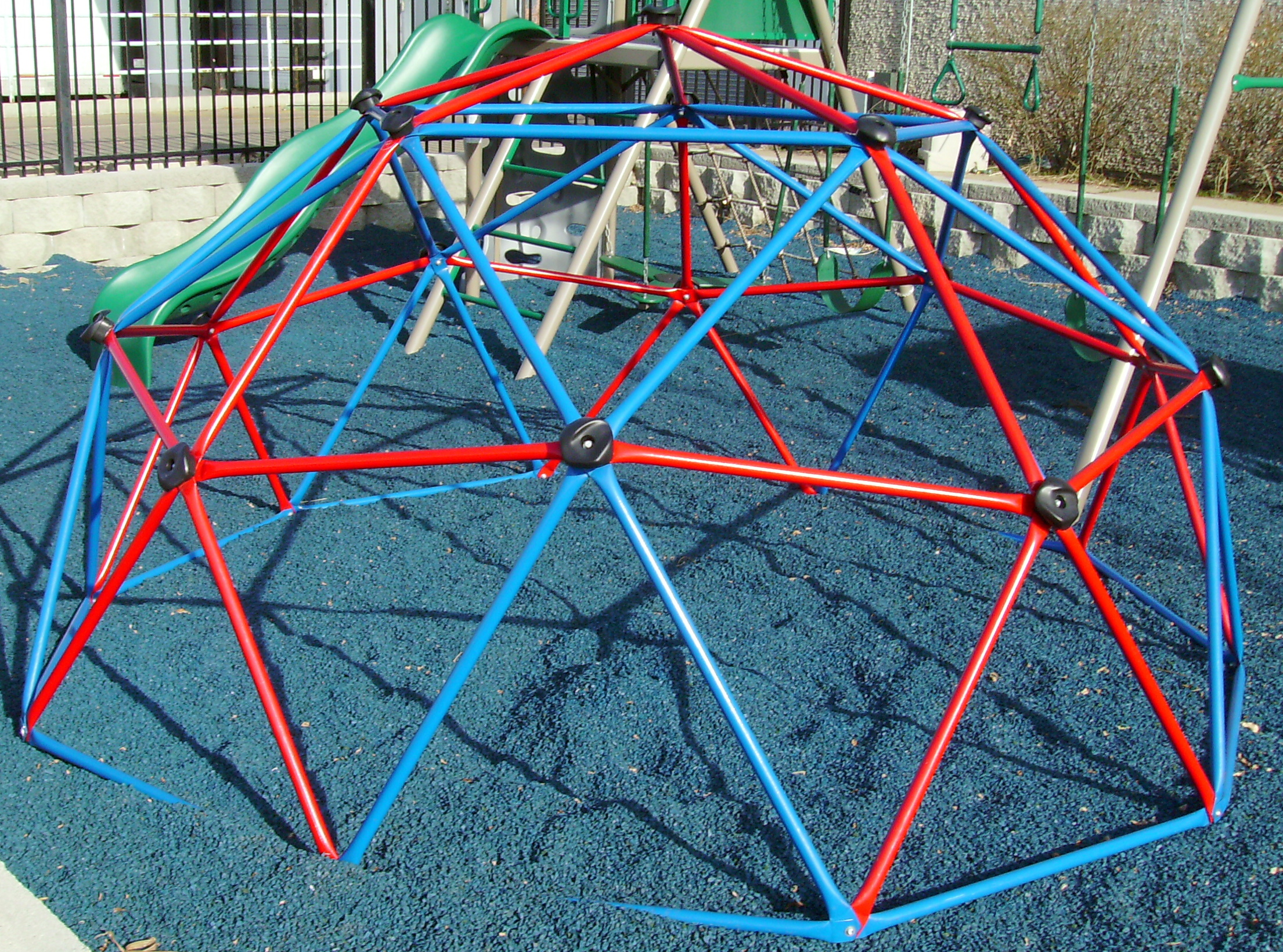
A home-use dome climber

The first jungle gym was invented in 1920 and patented by lawyer Sebastian Hinton in Chicago. It was sold under the trademarked name Junglegym. Hinton's second prototype "jungle gym" is still standing at the Winnetka Historical Society where it was relocated from the Crow Island School in Winnetka, Illinois. The term "monkey bars" appears at least as far back as the 1930s, though Hinton's initial 1920 patent appeals to the "monkey instinct" in claiming the benefits of climbing as exercise and play for children, and his improvement patents later that year refer to monkeys shaking the bars of a cage, children swinging on a "monkey runway", and the game of "monkey tag".

When Sebastian Hinton was a child, his father, mathematician Charles Hinton, had built a similar structure from bamboo with the goal of enabling children to gain an intuitive understanding of three-dimensional space through a game in which numbers for the x, y, and z axes were called out, and each child tried to be the first to grasp the indicated junction. Thus, the abstraction of Cartesian coordinates could be grasped as a name of a tangible point in space.

== Safety ==
To reduce the risk of injury from falls, jungle gym areas often have a thick layer of woodchips, sand or other impact-absorbing material covering the ground. The American National Safety Council recommends that playgrounds have at least 12 inches (30 cm) of such material.

== Gallery ==
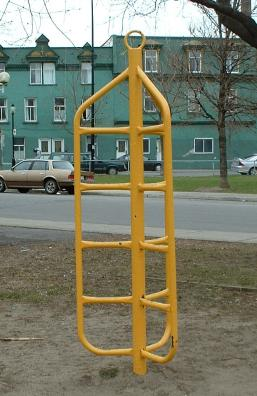
A small jungle gym

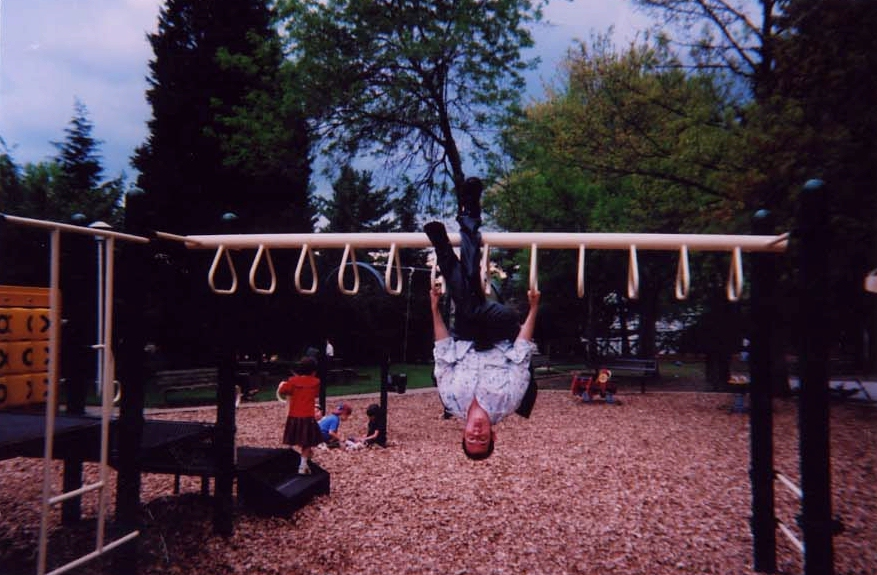
Young man hanging from monkey bars

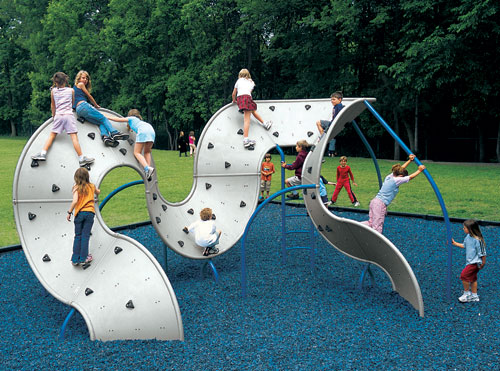
Landscape structures mobius climber

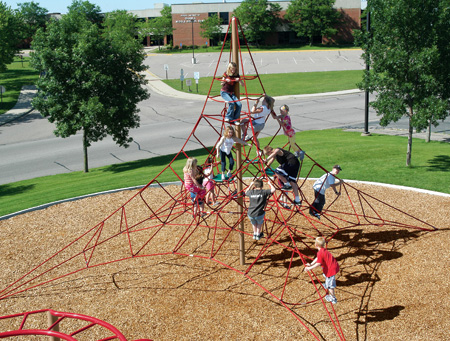
Landscape structures spacenet climber

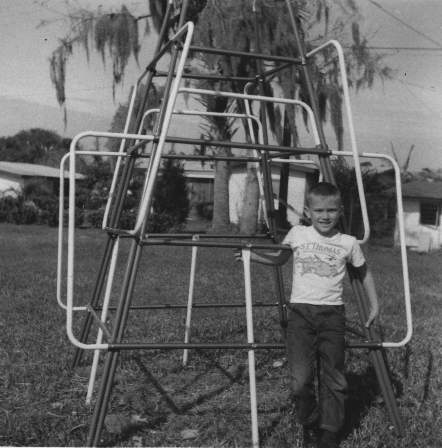
Boy in front of jungle gym, 1967

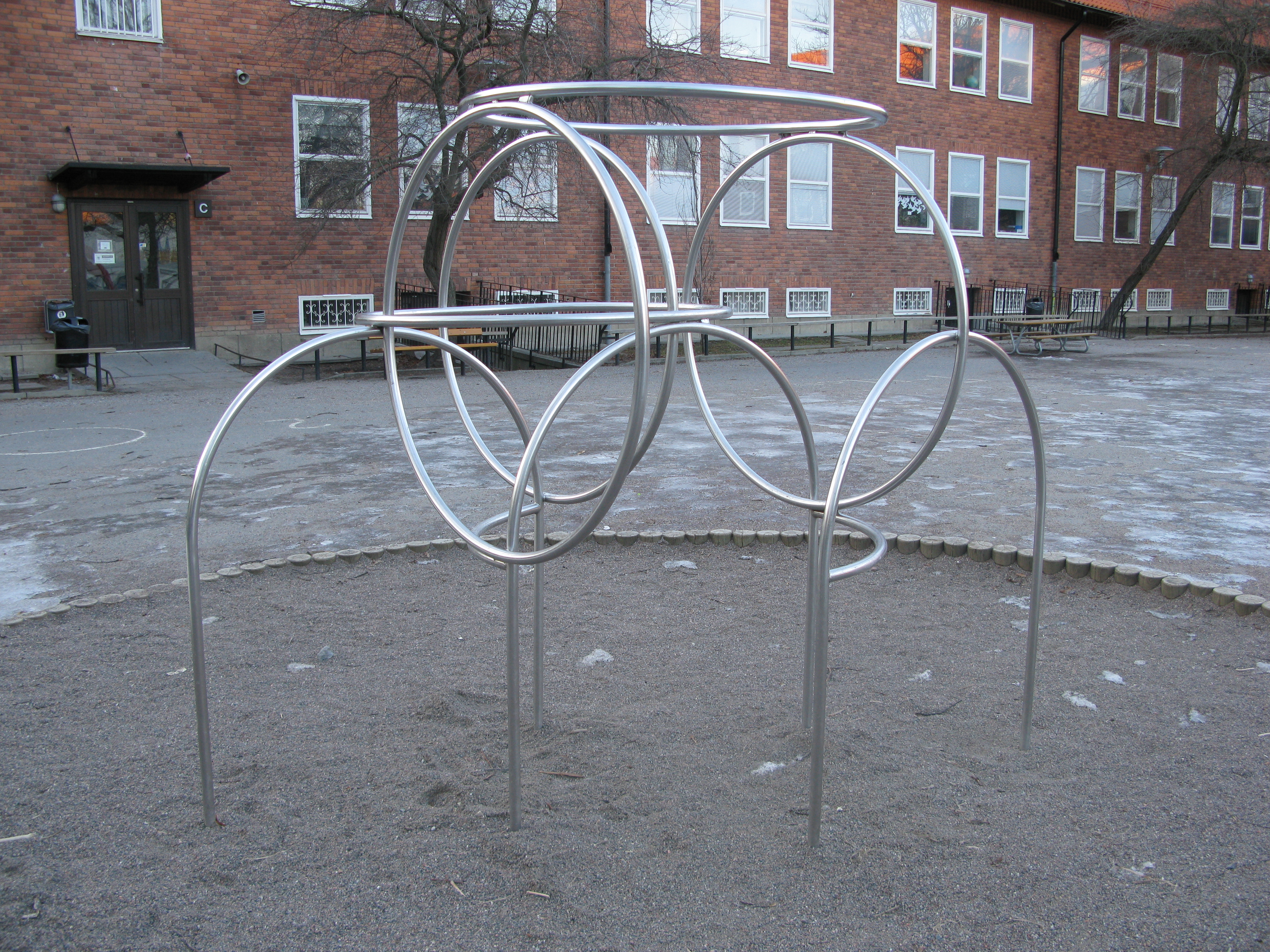
A jungle gym in a school yard in Sweden, 2012

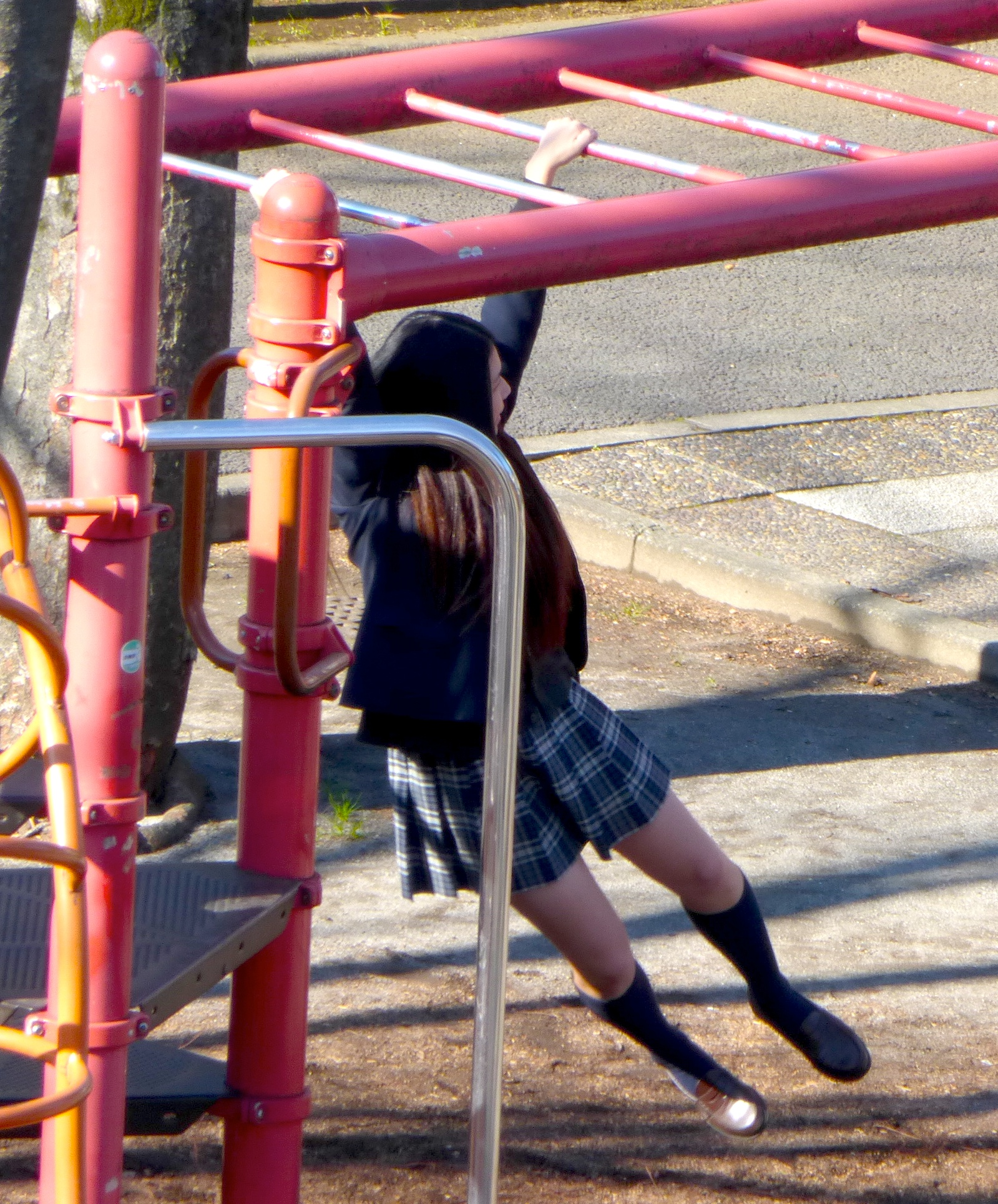
Japanese schoolgirl on some monkey bars (雲梯), 2014

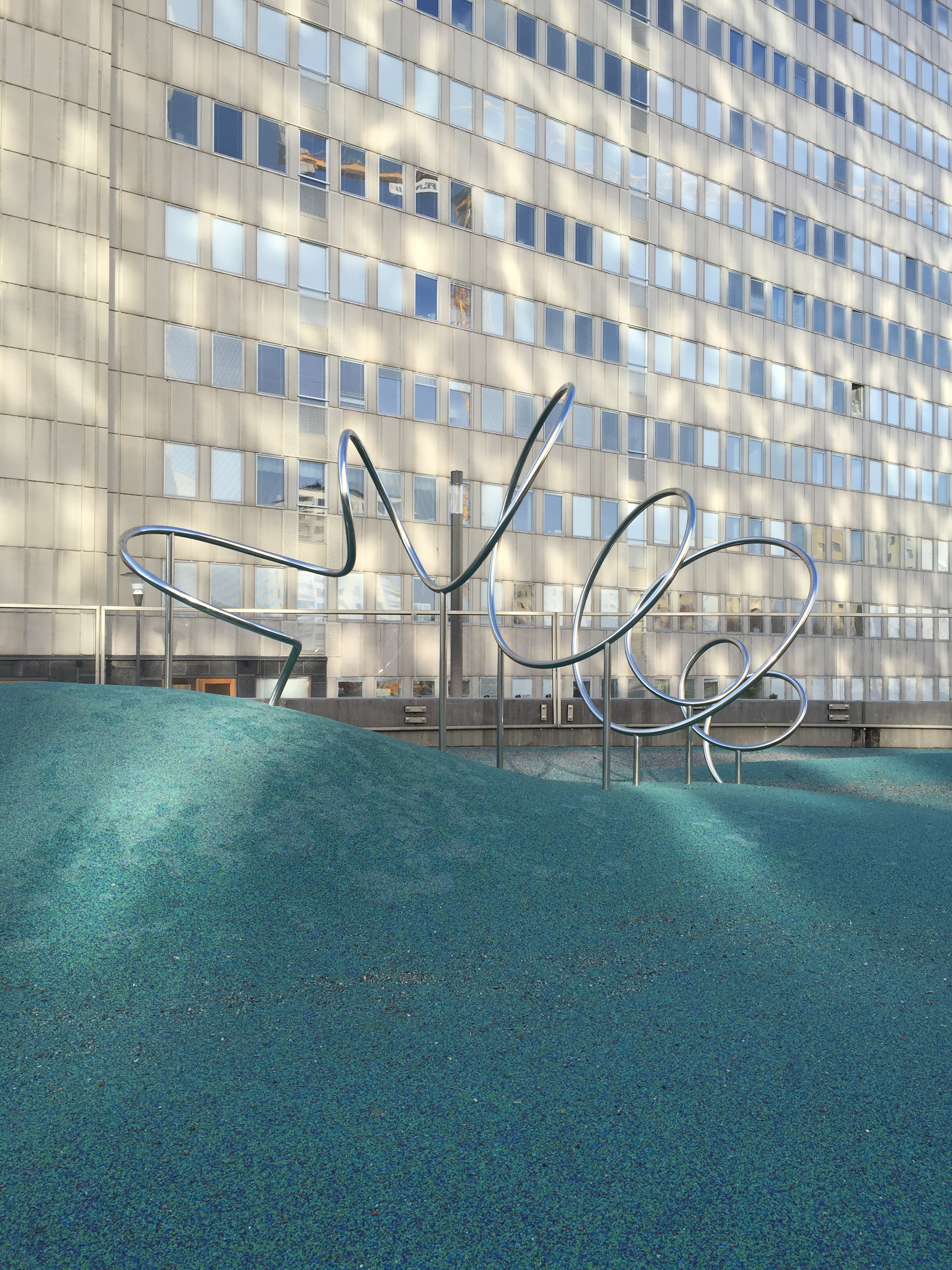
A jungle gym in Sweden, 2016

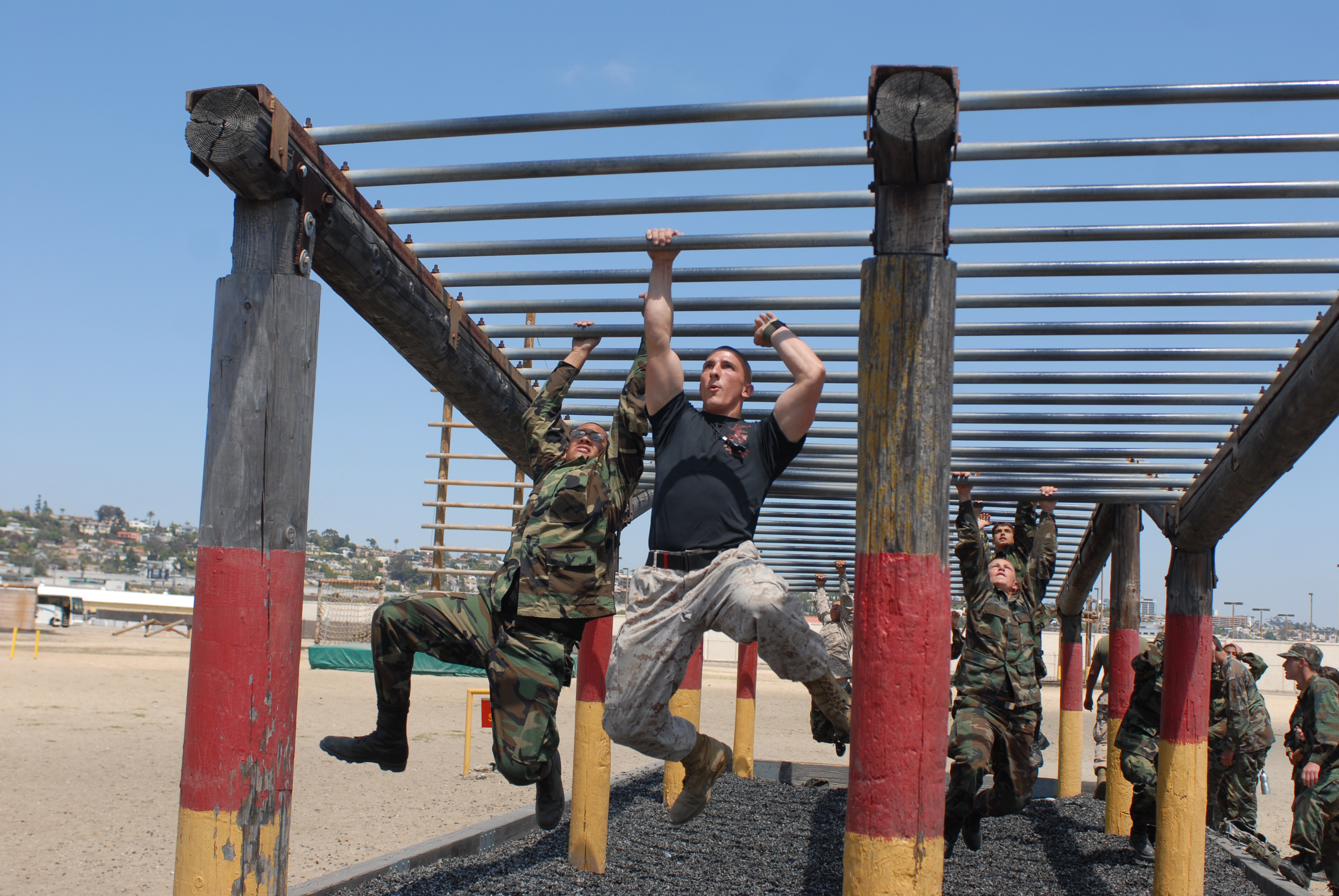
Military variant of the monkey bars

== See also ==
- Jungle Jim (disambiguation)
- Outdoor playset
- Brachiation
