= Flaming Fury (1949 film) =

1949 film by George Blair

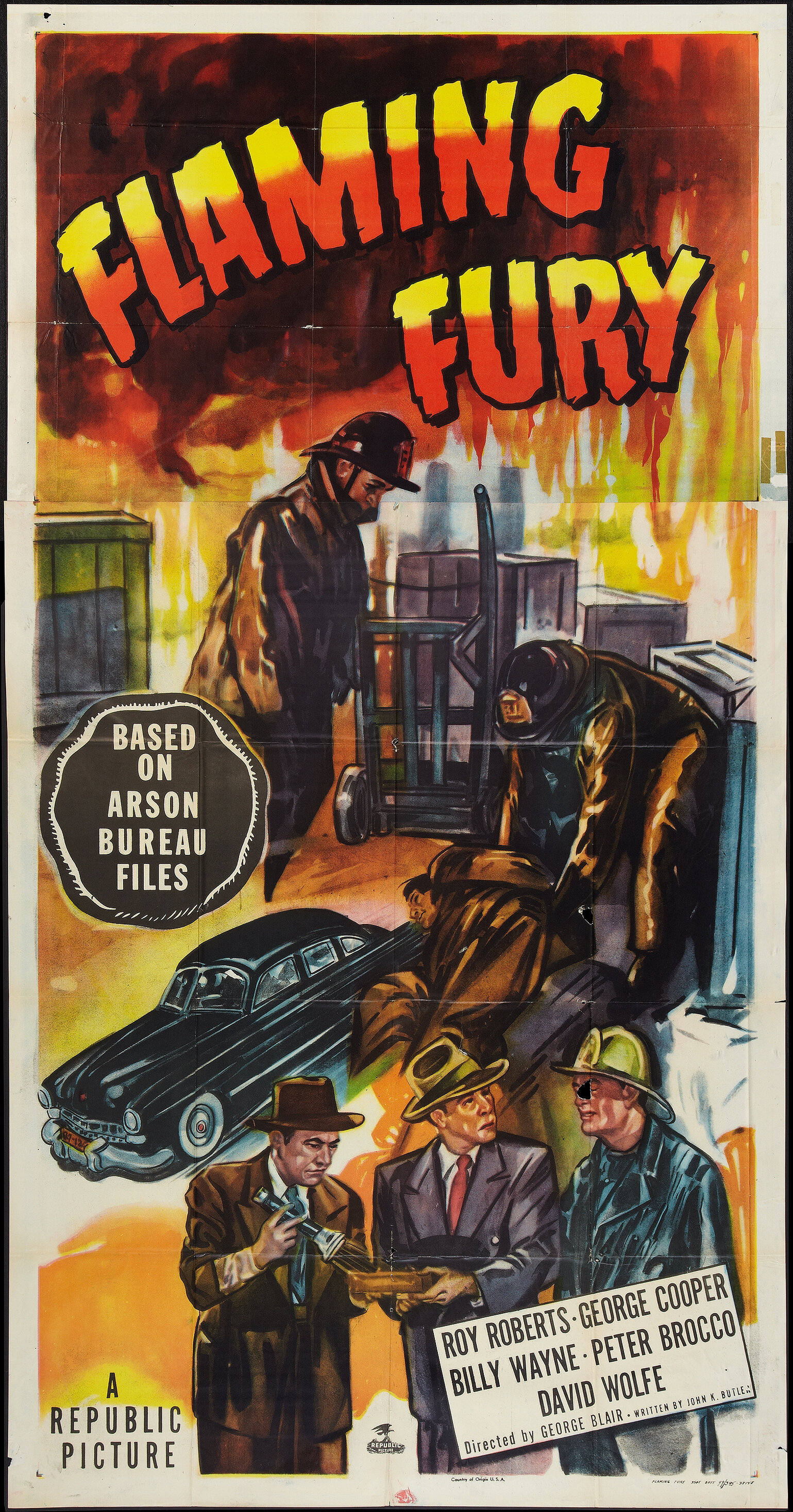
- Theatrical release poster
- Directed by: George Blair
- Screenplay by: John K. Butler
- Produced by: Sidney Picker
- Starring: George Cooper; Roy Roberts; Billy Wayne; Peter Brocco; David Wolfe; Paul Marion
- Cinematography: John MacBurnie
- Edited by: Tony Martinelli
- Production company: Republic Pictures
- Distributed by: Republic Pictures
- Release date: July 28, 1949
- Running time: 60 minutes
- Country: United States
- Language: English

Flaming Fury is a 1949 American crime film directed by George Blair and written by John K. Butler. The film stars George Cooper, Roy Roberts, Billy Wayne, Peter Brocco, David Wolfe and Paul Marion. The film was released on July 28, 1949, by Republic Pictures.

== Cast ==
- George Cooper as Russ Haines
- Roy Roberts as Capt. S. Taplinger
- Billy Wayne as Sgt. 'Berk' Berkeley
- Peter Brocco as E. V. Wessman
- David Bauer as Tony Polacheck (as David Wolfe)
- Paul Marion as Sam Polacheck
- Ransom M. Sherman as Oscar Hollingsworth
- Cliff Clark as Fire Engineer Robby Rollins
- Celia Lovsky as Bertha Polacheck
- Jimmie Dodd as Kenneth Bender
- G. Pat Collins as Battalion Fire Chief
