= Don W. Moore =

American comics writer and screenwriter (1904–1986)

- Born: Donald Wynkoop Moore; August 22, 1904; Anamosa, Iowa, US
- Died: April 7, 1986 (aged 81); Venice, Florida, US
- Education: Dartmouth College
- Occupations: Comics writer; screenwriter
- Employer: King Features Syndicate
- Notable work: Flash Gordon; Jungle Jim
- Spouse: Isabel Walsh (m. 1934; div. 1946) Eris Crowe (m. 1958); Anne

Donald Wynkoop Moore (August 22, 1904 – April 7, 1986) was an American comics writer and screenwriter. Originally a journalist who founded the Nassau News Bureau and a magazine editor, he worked at King Features Syndicate as the writer of Alex Raymond's comic strips Flash Gordon and Jungle Jim. He also worked in film and television as a screenwriter, story editor, and producer, with his work including Captain Video and His Video Rangers and Rod Brown of the Rocket Rangers, Rawhide, Sea Hunt, and Death Valley Days, as well as in magazine advertising.

== Biography ==
Moore was born on August 22, 1904, in Anamosa, Iowa, son of Mary Virginia (née Wynkoop) and Eugene Roscoe Moore, the latter of whom was a United States Marshal at the Northern District of Iowa. He attended Dubuque Senior High School, where he was the top graduate in 1919, and he obtained a BA in English from Dartmouth College, where he ranked second in his 1925 graduating class.

Moore started his journalism career in Miami (where his parents retired), working for The Miami News and The Miami Beach Beacon. He later moved to the Bahamas, where he started the Nassau News Bureau and was a local correspondent for Associated Press and United Press International. In a 1980 Sarasota Herald-Tribune interview, he remarked about his experiences working for two news wire agencies: "I was careful not to tell the one, I worked for the other. I scooped myself frequently". He also humorously described his early career as "y[ea]rs of starvation and plenty as an alleged newspaperman, publicity man, AP correspondent, youmorist, whatnot."

After working at Argosy All-Story Weekly as an associate editor and at Cosmopolitan as a fiction editor, Moore joined King Features Syndicate as the writer for Alex Raymond's comic strip Flash Gordon, being paid $25 a week for the job. Flash Gordon subsequently rose to nationwide popularity, spawning a serial film in the 1930s. He later wrote Jungle Jim, also from Raymond but less popular. The Sarasota Herald-Tribune remarked that he "was one of a handful of comic strip writers who wrote of things like television, the atomic bomb and radar before they became reality". During World War II, he left King Features to serve for the United States Armed Forces, namely in the Adjutant General's Corps, the Signal Corps, and the Department of War's Bureau of Public Relations; he ended the war as an army major.

Moore's writing work included the early space operas Captain Video and His Video Rangers and Rod Brown of the Rocket Rangers as well as episodes for Rawhide and Sea Hunt. He also worked as a story editor for CBS, Metro-Goldwyn-Mayer, RKO Pictures, Screen Gems, and Warner Bros. Pictures, with one of these shows being Death Valley Days, as well as a production supervisor for Studio One. He later worked in magazine advertising, especially after almost dying from an asthma attack in 1964; the magazines he worked in would specialize in business, trade, and health food.

Moore married three times: firstly to Isabel Walsh from 1934 until they divorced in 1946; secondly to Eris Crowe from 1958 to some unknown date; and eventually to Anne until his death. He had two grandchildren. He once spent time with the Underwater Demolition Team training in the Virgin Islands, inspiring his 1956 book The Naked Warriors, which he wrote with F. D. Fane. Originally living in California, he moved to Venice in 1969 as part of his retirement. During his later life, he was a member of the Dartmouth Club of Sarasota, Friendly Sons of St. Patrick, and Venice Epiphany Cathedral.

Moore died on April 7, 1986, aged 81, in Venice, Florida.
