= Henry Batista =

American film and television editor

- Born: Henry Richard Batista; February 3, 1914; Pasadena, California, U.S.
- Died: August 15, 2002 (aged 88); Palm Desert, California, U.S.
- Occupations: Film and television editor

Henry Batista (1914-2002) was an American film and television editor active from the 1930s through the 1970s.

== Biography ==
Henry Batista was born in Pasadena, California, to Henry Batista and Rose Delara, both of whom had emigrated to the United States from Italy. Before he got into film editing, he was a renowned golfer in Southern California, and he continued playing throughout his life. He was nominated for an Academy Award for Best Editing for his work on 1954's The Caine Mutiny.

== Selected filmography ==
- Jungle Moon Men (1955)
- Cell 2455, Death Row (1955)
- Women's Prison (1955)
- The Bamboo Prison (1954)
- Masterson of Kansas (1954)
- They Rode West (1954)
- The Caine Mutiny (1954)
- Charge of the Lancers (1954)
- Mission Over Korea (1953)
- Savage Mutiny (1953)
- The Four Poster (1952)
- Jungle Jim in the Forbidden Land (1952)
- Purple Heart Diary (1951)
- Jungle Manhunt (1951)
- The Brave Bulls (1951)
- Last of the Buccaneers (1950)
- David Harding, Counterspy (1950)
- Cow Town (1950)
- Captive Girl (1950)
- Mark of the Gorilla (1950)
- Sons of New Mexico (1949)
- Holiday in Havana (1949)
- The Cowboy and the Indians (1949)
- Blondie Hits the Jackpot (1949)
- Law of the Barbary Coast (1949)
- Blondie's Big Deal (1949)
- The Big Sombrero (1949)
- Racing Luck (1948)
- The Gentleman from Nowhere (1948)
- The Strawberry Roan (1948)
- The Lone Wolf in London (1947)
- Blondie in the Dough (1947)
- King of the Wild Horses (1947)
- Blind Spot (1947)
- Betty Co-Ed (1946)
- My Name Is Julia Ross (1945)
