= Mark of the Gorilla =

1950 film

- Directed by: William Berke
- Written by: Carroll Young
- Based on: Jungle Jim; 1934-1954 comic strip by Don Moore and Alex Raymond
- Produced by: Sam Katzman
- Starring: Johnny Weissmuller; Suzanne Dalbert; Trudy Marshall
- Cinematography: Ira H. Morgan
- Edited by: Henry Batista
- Music by: Mischa Bakaleinikoff
- Production company: Sam Katzman Productions
- Distributed by: Columbia Pictures
- Release date: January 12, 1950
- Running time: 67 minutes
- Country: USA
- Language: English

Mark of the Gorilla is a 1950 film starring Johnny Weissmuller based on the comic strip Jungle Jim. It is the third in the series of Jungle Jim films.

== Plot ==
Gorilla attacks on humans are a surprise to Jungle Jim, as the creatures are not known to exist in this part of Africa. On his way to see Frank Bentley, warden of the Nairobi animal preserve, Jim encounters Nyobi, a young woman in distress, and saves her life.

Bentley is ill and is being treated by Dr. Brandt, who, unknown to all, is in league with fortune hunters trying to find a trove of hidden Nazi gold. Barbara Bentley, the warden's niece, accompanies Jim and learns that men are wearing animal costumes, disguising themselves as gorillas and lions, to make the deaths appear accidental.

Although all three are captured, Jim is able to free Barbara and Nyobi and defeat the culprits. Nyobi, revealing that she is actually a princess, is permitted to take the gold back to her people.

== Cast ==
- Johnny Weissmuller as Jungle Jim
- Trudy Marshall as Barbara
- Suzanne Dalbert as Nyobi
- Onslow Stevens as Dr. Brandt
- Selmer Jackson as Frank Bentley

== Production ==
Filming started on September 14, 1949.
