= Johnny Weissmuller =

American swimmer, water-polo player, and actor (1904–1984)

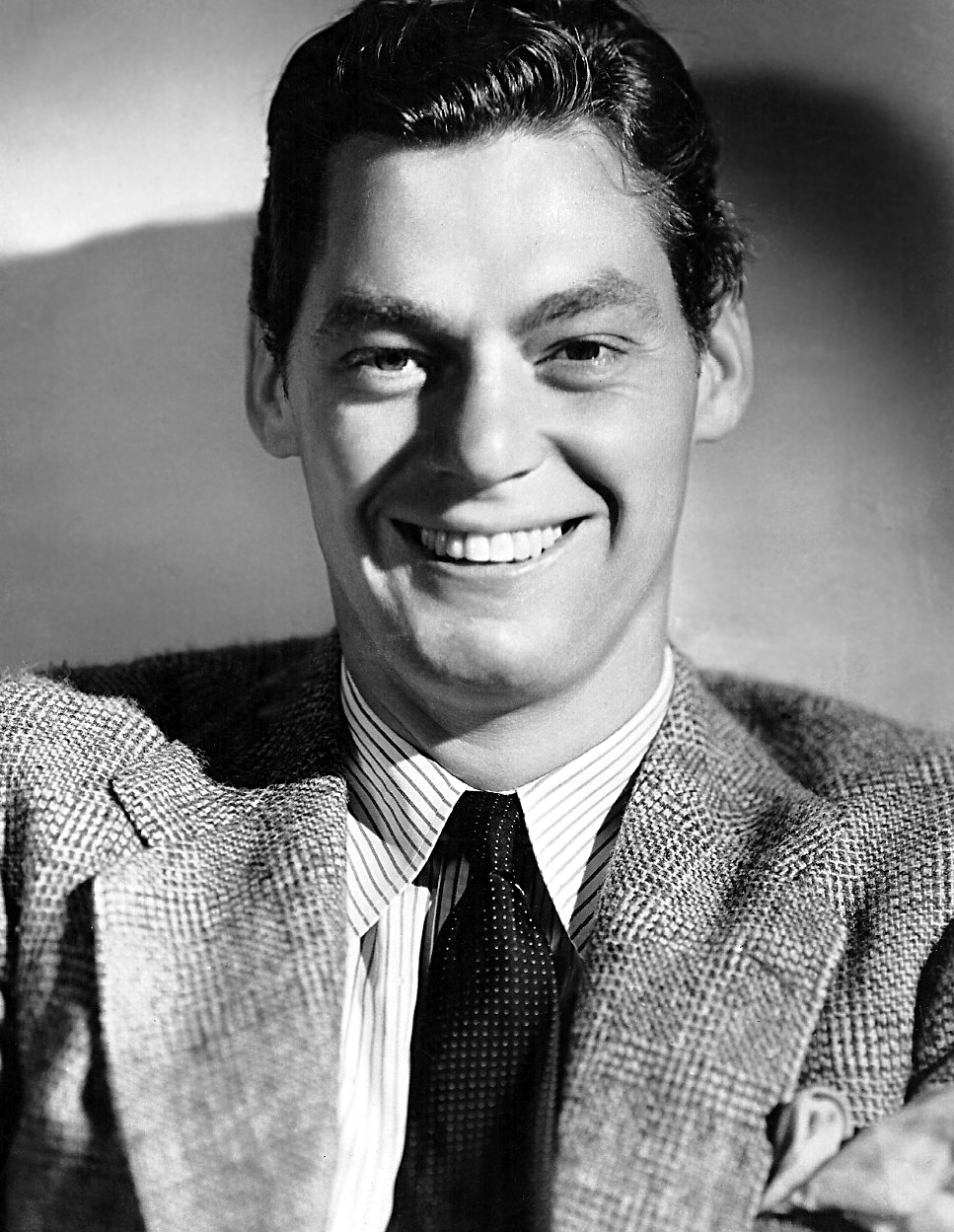
- Weissmuller c. 1940s
- Born: Johann Peter Weißmüller; June 2, 1904; Szabadfalva, Temes County, Austria-Hungary (now Freidorf, Timisoara, Timis County, Romania)
- Died: January 20, 1984 (aged 79); Acapulco, Guerrero, Mexico
- Occupations: Olympic swimmer; water polo player; actor
- Years active: 1929–1976
- Spouses: Bobbe Arnst (m. 1931; div. 1933) Lupe Vélez (m. 1933; div. 1939) Beryl Scott (m. 1939; div. 1948) Allene Gates (m. 1948; div. 1962) Maria Gertrude Baumann (m. 1963)
- Children: 3
- Sports career
- Height: 6 ft 3 in (191 cm)
- Weight: 191 lb (87 kg)
- Sport: Swimming, water polo
- Club: Illinois Athletic Club; William Bachrach, Coach
Medal record
Representing the United States
Swimming
Olympic Games
Gold medal – first place	1924 Paris	100 m freestyle
Gold medal – first place	1924 Paris	400 m freestyle
Gold medal – first place	1924 Paris	4×200 m freestyle
Gold medal – first place	1928 Amsterdam	100 m freestyle
Gold medal – first place	1928 Amsterdam	4×200 m freestyle
Water polo
Olympic Games
Bronze medal – third place	1924 Paris	Team

Johnny Weissmuller (/ˈwaɪsmʌlər/ WYSSE-mul-ər; born Johann Peter Weißmüller, German: [ˈjoːhan ˈpeːtɐ ˈvaɪsmʏlɐ]; June 2, 1904 – January 20, 1984) was an American Olympic swimmer, water polo player and actor. He set world records alongside winning five gold medals in the Olympics. He won the 100m freestyle and the 4 × 200 m relay team event in the 1924 Summer Olympics in Paris and the 1928 Summer Olympics in Amsterdam. Weissmuller also won gold in the 400m freestyle, as well as a bronze medal in the water polo competition in Paris.

Following his retirement from swimming, Weissmuller played Edgar Rice Burroughs's Tarzan in twelve feature films from 1932 to 1948; six were produced by MGM, and six additional films by RKO. Weissmuller went on to star in sixteen Jungle Jim movies over an eight-year period, then filmed 26 additional half-hour episodes of the Jungle Jim TV series.

== Early life ==
Johann Peter Weißmüller was born on June 2, 1904, in Szabadfalva, in the Kingdom of Hungary into an ethnically Banat Swabian family. An ancestor had immigrated from Baden, Holy Roman Empire c. 1749. Three days later he was baptized into the Catholic faith by the Hungarian version of his German name, as János. Early the next year, January 26, 1905, his father, Peter Weißmüller, and mother, Elisabeth Weißmüller (née Kersch), took him on a twelve-day trip on the S.S. Rotterdam to Ellis Island. Soon they arrived in Windber, Pennsylvania, to live with family. Johnny's brother Peter was born the following September.

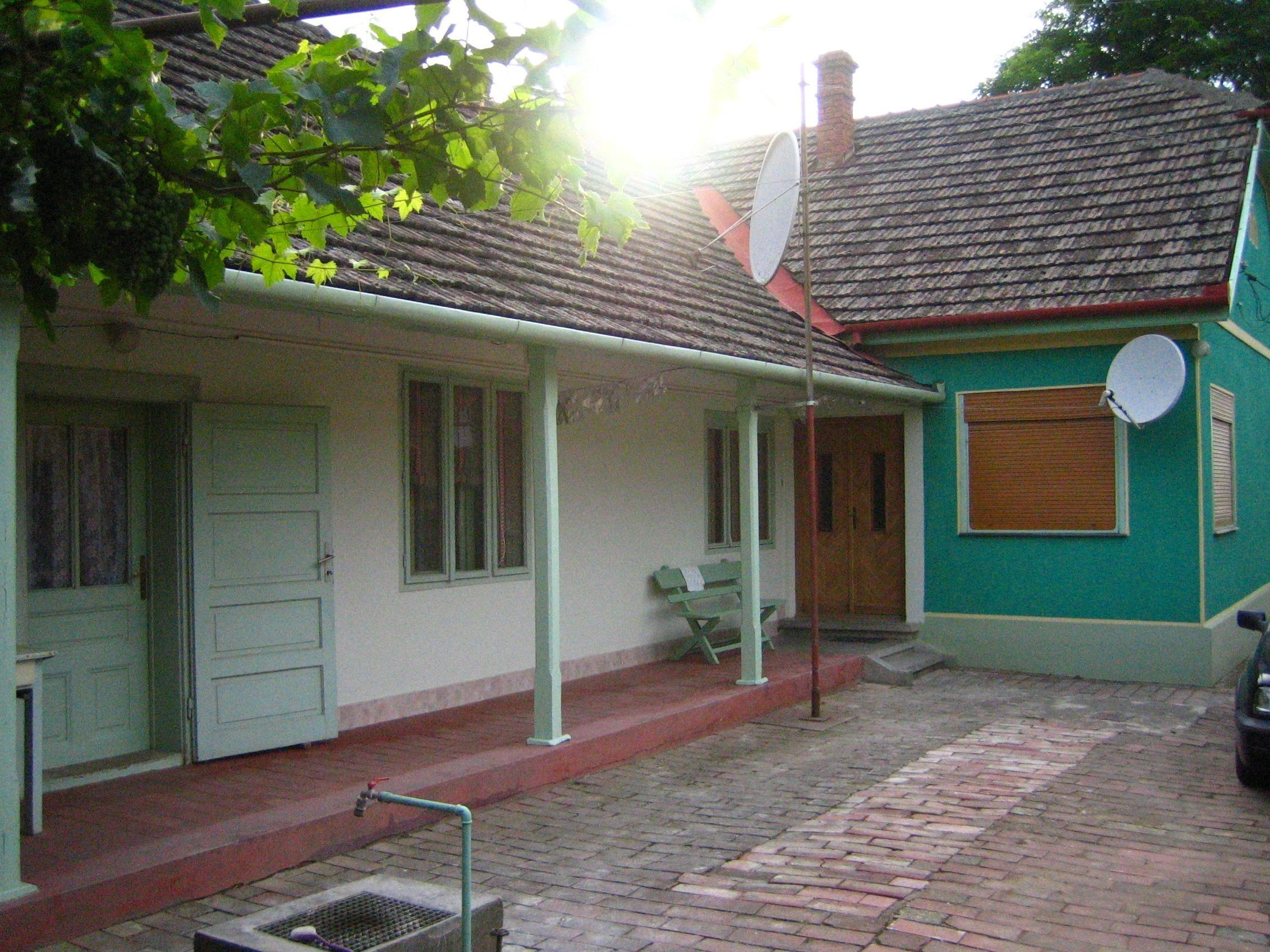
Weißmüller lived in this house during the first months of his life in Freidorf (now part of Timișoara)

Three years later they relocated to Chicago to be with his mother's parents. His parents rented a single level in a shared house where he lived during his childhood. At age nine, Weissmüller contracted polio. His doctor recommended swimming to help his recovery from the disease. Fullerton Beach on Lake Michigan is where Johnny's love for swimming took off, for he took his first swimming lessons there. He excelled immediately and began entering and winning every race he could. Johnny's father deserted the family when Johnny was in the eighth grade. He left school to begin working in order to support his mother and younger brother.

When Weissmuller was 11 he lied to join the YMCA, which had a 12-year-old age minimum rule to join. He won every swimming race he entered and also excelled at running and high jumping. He eventually swam for one of the nation's best teams, the Illinois Athletic Club.

== Swimming career ==
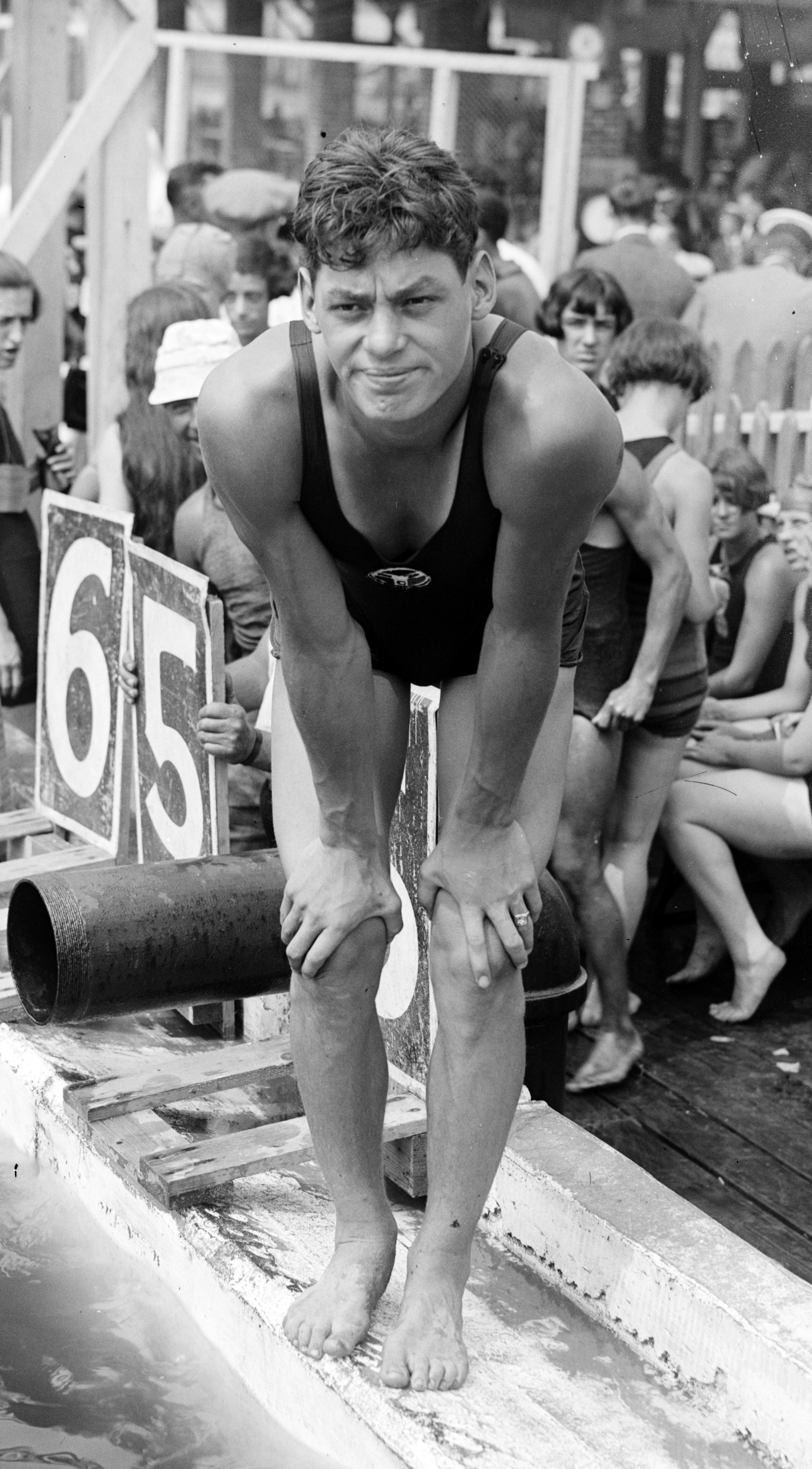
Weissmuller in 1924

Weissmuller tried out for swimming coach Bill Bachrach, then associated with the Illinois Athletic Club. Impressed with what he saw, Bachrach took Weissmuller under his wing, and served as a strong father figure and mentor for Johnny. On August 6, 1921, Weissmuller swam one of first meets, entering and winning four Amateur Athletic Union races. He set his first two world records at the A.A.U. Nationals on September 27, 1921, in the 100m and 150yd events.

On July 9, 1922, Weissmuller broke Duke Kahanamoku's world record in the 100-meter freestyle, swimming it in 58.6 seconds.

=== Olympics ===
He won the title for the 100-meter freestyle at the 1924 Summer Olympics, beating Kahanamoku for the gold medal. He also won the 400-meter freestyle and was a member of the winning U.S. team in the 4×200-meter relay.

Four years later, at the 1928 Summer Olympics in Amsterdam, he won another two gold medals. It was during this period that Weissmuller became an enthusiast for John Harvey Kellogg's holistic lifestyle views on nutrition, enemas and exercise. He went to Kellogg's Battle Creek, Michigan, sanatorium to dedicate its new 120-foot swimming pool, and break one of his own previous swimming records after adopting the vegetarian diet prescribed by Kellogg.

In 1927, Weissmuller set a new world record of 51.0 seconds in the 100-yard freestyle, which stood for 17 years. He improved it to 48.5 seconds at Billy Rose World's Fair Aquacade in 1940, aged 36, but this result was discounted, as he was competing as a professional. As a member of the U.S. men's national water polo team, he won a bronze medal at the 1924 Summer Olympics. He also competed in the 1928 Olympics, where the U.S. team finished in seventh place.

In all, Weissmuller won five Olympic gold medals and one bronze medal, 52 United States national championships, and set 67 world records. He was the first man to swim the 100-meter freestyle under one minute and the 440-yard freestyle under five minutes. He never lost a race and retired with an unbeaten amateur record. In 1950, he was selected by the Associated Press as the greatest swimmer of the first half of the 20th century.

During the 1930s, before he acted as Tarzan, Weissmuller was a swimming instructor at the Miami Biltmore Hotel. He broke a world record at the Biltmore pool.

== Film career ==
Weissmuller's first film was the non-speaking role of Adonis in the movie Glorifying the American Girl. He appeared wearing only a fig leaf while hoisting actress Mary Eaton on his shoulders. He was noticed by the writer Cyril Hume, which led to his big break playing Tarzan in Tarzan the Ape Man in 1932.

Weissmüller (Tarzan) with Maureen O'Sullivan (Jane) in Tarzan's Secret Treasure

When asked to play Tarzan, Weissmuller was already under contract to model BVD underwear. MGM agreed to have actresses such as Greta Garbo and Marie Dressler featured in BVD ads so that he could be released from his BVD contract. The author of Tarzan, Edgar Rice Burroughs, was pleased with Weissmuller, although he so hated the studio's depiction of Tarzan as an individual who barely spoke English that he created his own concurrent Tarzan series starring Herman Brix as a suitably articulate version of the character (as is true to the original books).

Weissmuller is considered the definitive Tarzan. He originated the famous Tarzan yell, which was created by sound recordist Douglas Shearer. Shearer recorded Weissmuller's normal yell, but manipulated it and played it in reverse.

Weissmuller went on to play the lead in the film Jungle Jim. He appeared in sixteen Jungle Jim movies over eight years, going on to film 26 episodes of the Jungle Jim TV series.

Weissmuller retired from acting in 1957.

== Personal life ==
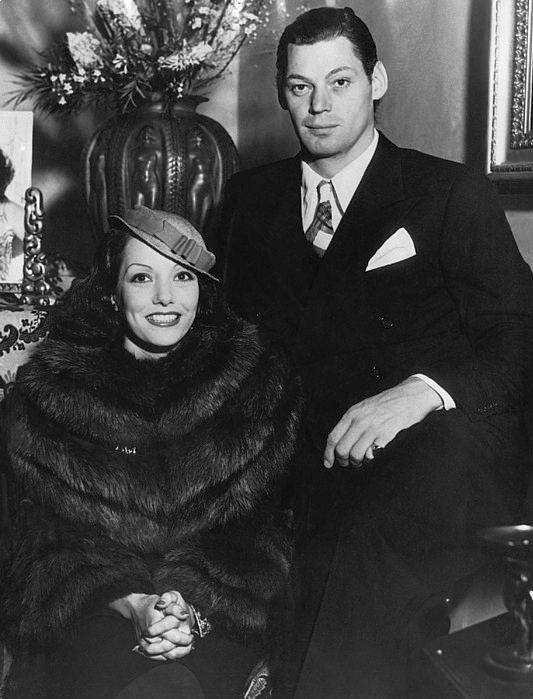
With his second wife, the Mexican actress Lupe Vélez, in a newspaper press photo (1934)

Weissmuller was married five times: to band and club singer Bobbe Arnst (married 1931, divorced 1933); to actress Lupe Vélez (married 1933, divorced 1939); to Beryl Scott (married 1939, divorced 1948); to Allene Gates (married 1948, divorced 1962); and to Maria Gertrude Baumann (born 1921, died 2004; they were married from 1963 until his death in 1984).

With his third wife, Beryl, Weissmuller had three children: Johnny Weissmuller Jr. (1940–2006), Wendy Anne Weissmuller (born 1942), and Heidi Elizabeth Weissmuller (1944–1962), who was killed in a car crash. He also had a stepdaughter with Baumann, Lisa Weissmuller-Gallagher.

Weissmuller saved many people's lives throughout his own life. One very notable instance was in 1927 during training for the Chicago Marathon, when Weissmuller saved 11 people from drowning after a boat accident. On July 28, 1927, 16 children, 10 women, and 1 man drowned when the Favorite, a small excursion boat cruising from Lincoln Park to Municipal Pier (Navy Pier), capsized half a mile off North Avenue in a sudden, heavy squall. When the boat tipped over, 75 women and children and 6 men sank with the boat, but rescuers saved over 50 of them. Weissmuller was one of the Chicago lifeguards who saved many.

== Later life ==
In 1974, Weissmuller broke both his hip and leg, marking the beginning of years of declining health. While hospitalized he learned that in spite of his strength and lifelong daily regimen of swimming and exercise, he had a serious heart condition. In 1977, Weissmuller suffered a series of strokes. In 1979, he entered the Motion Picture & Television Country House and Hospital in Woodland Hills, California, for several weeks before moving with his last wife, Maria, to Acapulco, Mexico, the location of his last Tarzan movie.

On January 20, 1984, Weissmuller died of pulmonary edema at the age of 79. He was buried just outside Acapulco, Valle de La Luz, at the Valley of the Light Cemetery. As his coffin was lowered into the ground, a recording of the Tarzan yell he invented was played three times, at his request. He was honored with a 21-gun salute, befitting a head of state, which was arranged by Senator Ted Kennedy and President Ronald Reagan.

== Legacy ==
For his contribution to the motion picture industry, Johnny Weissmuller has a star on the Hollywood Walk of Fame.

He is on the album cover of The Beatles' Sgt. Pepper's Lonely Hearts Club Band (1967).

His former co-star and movie son Johnny Sheffield wrote of him, "I can only say that working with Big John was one of the highlights of my life. He was a Star (with a capital "S") and he gave off a special light and some of that light got into me. Knowing and being with Johnny Weissmuller during my formative years had a lasting influence on my life."

In 1973, Weissmuller was awarded the George Eastman Award, given by George Eastman House for distinguished contribution to the art of film.

The Piscine Molitor in Paris was built as a tribute to Weissmuller and his swimming prowess.

Edgar Rice Burroughs himself paid tribute to Weissmuller's powerful screen persona in the last Tarzan novel that he completed

But what seemed a long time to them was a matter of seconds only. The tiger's great frame went limp and sank to the ground. And the man rose and put a foot upon it and, raising his face to the heavens, voiced a horrid cry—the victory cry of the bull ape. Corrie was suddenly terrified of this man who had always seemed so civilized and cultured. Even the men were shocked.

Suddenly recognition lighted the eyes of Jerry Lucas. "John Clayton," he said, "Lord Greystoke—Tarzan of the Apes!" Shrimp's jaw dropped. "Is dat Johnny Weismuller? [sic]" he demanded. Tarzan shook his head as though to clear his brain of an obsession. His thin veneer of civilization had been consumed by the fires of battle. ...

Weissmuller was inducted into the International Swimming Hall of Fame in 1965 after becoming its founding chairman.

== Filmography ==
Johnny Weissmuller in Film
Year	Film	Role	Notes
1929	Glorifying the American Girl	Adonis	Cameo appearance in the segment 'Loveland'
1931	Swim or Sink	Himself	Short subject
1931	Water Bugs	Himself	Short subject
1932	Tarzan the Ape Man	Tarzan	
1932	The Human Fish	Himself	Short subject
1934	Tarzan and His Mate	Tarzan	
1936	Tarzan Escapes	Tarzan	
1939	Tarzan Finds a Son!	Tarzan	
1941	Tarzan's Secret Treasure	Tarzan	
1942	Tarzan's New York Adventure	Tarzan	
1943	Tarzan Triumphs	Tarzan	Complete title: Edgar Rice Burroughs' Tarzan Triumphs
1943	Stage Door Canteen	Himself	Cameo role washing dishes.
1943	Tarzan's Desert Mystery	Tarzan	Complete title: Edgar Rice Burroughs' Tarzan's Desert Mystery
1945	Tarzan and the Amazons	Tarzan	Complete title: Edgar Rice Burroughs' Tarzan and the Amazons
1946	Tarzan and the Leopard Woman	Tarzan	Complete title: Edgar Rice Burroughs' Tarzan and the Leopard Woman
1946	Swamp Fire	Johnny Duval	co-starring Buster Crabbe
1947	Tarzan and the Huntress	Tarzan	Complete title: Edgar Rice Burroughs' Tarzan and the Huntress
1948	Tarzan and the Mermaids	Tarzan	Complete title: Edgar Rice Burroughs' Tarzan and the Mermaids
1948	Jungle Jim	Jungle Jim	
1949	The Lost Tribe	Jungle Jim	
1950	Mark of the Gorilla	Jungle Jim	
1950	Captive Girl	Jungle Jim	Alternative title: Jungle Jim and the Captive Girl
1950	Pygmy Island	Jungle Jim	Alternative title: Pigmy Island
1951	Fury of the Congo	Jungle Jim	
1951	Jungle Manhunt	Jungle Jim	
1952	Jungle Jim in the Forbidden Land	Jungle Jim	
1952	Voodoo Tiger	Jungle Jim	
1953	Savage Mutiny	Jungle Jim	
1953	Valley of Head Hunters	Jungle Jim	
1953	Killer Ape	Jungle Jim	
1954	Jungle Man-Eaters	Jungle Jim	
1954	Cannibal Attack	Johnny Weissmuller	
1955	Jungle Moon Men	Johnny Weissmuller	
1955	Devil Goddess	Johnny Weissmuller	
1970	The Phynx	Himself	
1974	The Great Masquerade	Sepy Debronvi	
1976	Won Ton Ton, the Dog Who Saved Hollywood	Stagehand No. 2	(final film role)
Television
Year	Title	Role	Notes
1956–1958	Jungle Jim	Jungle Jim	26 episodes
1958	You Bet Your Life	Guest Contestant	1

== Published works ==
- Weissmuller, Johnny; Bush, Clarence A. (1930). Swimming the American Crawl. London: G. P. Putnam's Sons. Autobiography, excerpts of which were published in The Saturday Evening Post.

== See also ==
- List of athletes with Olympic medals in different disciplines
- List of multiple Olympic gold medalists
- List of multiple Olympic gold medalists at a single Games
- List of Olympic medalists in swimming (men)
- List of Olympic medalists in water polo (men)
- List of multi-sport athletes
- World record progression 4 × 200 metres freestyle relay
- World record progression 100 metres freestyle
- World record progression 200 metres freestyle
- World record progression 400 metres freestyle
- World record progression 800 metres freestyle
- List of members of the International Swimming Hall of Fame

Records
Preceded by Tedford Cann	Men's 200-meter freestyle world record-holder (long course); May 26, 1922 – April 12, 1935	Succeeded by Jack Medica
Preceded by Arne Borg	Men's 400-meter freestyle world record-holder (long course); June 22, 1922 – December 9, 1924	Succeeded by Arne Borg
Preceded by Duke Kahanamoku	Men's 100-meter freestyle world record-holder (long course); July 19, 1922 – March 2, 1934	Succeeded by Peter Fick
Preceded by Boy Charlton	Men's 800-yard freestyle world record-holder (long course); July 27, 1927 – May 30, 1930	Succeeded by Jean Taris
