= Jungle Jim in the Forbidden Land =

1952 film by Lew Landers

- Film Poster
- Directed by: Lew Landers
- Written by: Samuel Newman
- Screenplay by: Alex Raymond
- Based on: Jungle Jim; 1934-1954 comic strip by Don Moore and Alex Raymond
- Produced by: Sam Katzman
- Starring: Johnny Weissmuller; Angela Greene
- Cinematography: Fayte M. Browne
- Edited by: Henry Batista
- Music by: Mischa Bakaleinikoff
- Production company: The Katzman Corporation
- Distributed by: Columbia Pictures
- Release date: March 17, 1952
- Running time: 65 minutes
- Country: United States
- Language: English

Jungle Jim in the Forbidden Land is a 1952 American black-and-white adventure film directed by Lew Landers, written by Samuel Newman and starring Johnny Weissmuller, Angela Greene and Jean Willes. It is the eighth entry in the Columbia Pictures Jungle Jim series.

== Plot ==
In Wasabi, Africa, anthropologist Dr. Linda Roberts embarks on an expedition to find the rumored land of the Giant People, aided by guide Jungle Jim after her original crew abandons her. As they navigate wildlife attacks and local dangers, government officials and traders become entangled in conflicts over ivory poaching and the captured giants. Betrayal and greed among the explorers leads to violence and chaos when the giants escape. Jungle Jim helps avert an elephant stampede, exposes the true criminals and restores order to the jungle.

== Cast ==
- Johnny Weissmuller as Jungle Jim
- Angela Greene as Dr. Linda Roberts
- Jean Willes as Denise
- Lester Matthews as Comm. Kingston
- William Tannen as Doc Edwards
- George Eldredge as Fred Lewis
- William Fawcett as Old One
- John Hart as Commissioner's Secretary
