= Fury of the Congo =

1951 film by William A. Berke

- Theatrical release poster
- Directed by: William Berke
- Screenplay by: Carroll Young
- Based on: Jungle Jim; 1934-1954 comic strip by Don Moore and Alex Raymond
- Produced by: Sam Katzman
- Starring: Johnny Weissmuller; William Henry
- Narrated by: James Seay
- Cinematography: Ira Morgan
- Edited by: Richard Fantl
- Music by: Mischa Bakaleinikoff
- Production company: Columbia Pictures
- Distributed by: Columbia Pictures
- Release date: February 1951
- Running time: 69 minutes
- Country: United States
- Language: English

Fury of the Congo (1951) is the sixth Jungle Jim film produced by Columbia Pictures and featuring Johnny Weissmuller in the title role. The film was directed by William Berke and written by Carroll Young.

== Plot ==
Adventurer Jungle Jim is traversing the jungles of the Congo when he notices a plane diving toward the river. Jim rescues the injured pilot, Ronald Cameron, from the deep waters. Cameron tells Jim that he is trying to find missing biochemistry professor Dunham pursuant to the University of Cairo's request. Dunham was last seen venturing into the jungles in search of a beast known as the Okongo.

The Okongo, half antelope and half zebra, is revered by the tribal natives of Congo and its glands are rumored to contain a rare type of drug. Jim and Cameron later discover from tribal chief Leta that Dunham and all the males of the Okongo tribe have been kidnapped by hunters eager to extract the drug from the Okongo's glands. Jim, Leta and Cameron reach the hunters' hideout and Leta releases the captured Okongo, which then kills one of the hunters. A fight ensues, during which Professor Dunham smashes all of the bottles of extracted Okongo drug.

Jim, Leta and Cameron flee. They encounter a sandstorm and Jim engages in a battle with a gigantic desert spider before returning to save Dunham's life. The professor, having been shot by one of the hunters, is left in the care of Cameron and Leta. Dunham recognizes Cameron as the leader of the notorious hunters, but they are all captured by Cameron and his henchmen. Jim is commanded to bring the hunters to the main herd of Okongos. Just as they arrive, the hunters are attacked by the armed wives of the male natives and the Okongos. Cameron escapes but falls from a cliff and dies. Leta and the natives savor their victory, and Jim and Dunham leave.

== Cast ==
- Johnny Weissmuller as Jungle Jim
- Sherry Moreland as Leta
- William Henry as Ronald Cameron
- Lyle Talbot as Grant
- Joel Friedkin as Professor Dunham
- George Eldredge as Barnes
- Rusty Wescoatt as Magruder
- Paul Marion as Raadi
- John Hart as Guard
- Pierce Lyden as Allen
- Blanca Vischer as Mahara

== Production ==
The film's working title was Jungle Menace. It is the sixth of the 16-film Jungle Jim series, all of which starred Johnny Weissmuller. Filming took place in late June 1950. California filming locations included Vasquez Rocks and Corriganville Movie Ranch.

== Reception ==
The film was officially released in North American cinemas in February 1951.

The Hollywood Reporter wrote: "Fury of the Congo packs enough excitement and color to please the juvenile and action fans." Variety commented that it was "mediocre filler fare at best", while the Motion Picture Herald described it as "largely juvenile in appeal".

== See also ==
- List of Columbia Pictures films
- List of film series with more than ten entries

== Bibliography ==
- Michael R. Pitts (2010). Columbia Pictures Horror, Science Fiction and Fantasy Films, 1928–1982. McFarland. ISBN 978-0-7864-5766-3.
- Gene Blottner (2012). Columbia Pictures Movie Series, 1926–1955: The Harry Cohn Years. McFarland. ISBN 978-0-7864-3353-7.
