= The Lost Tribe (1949 film) =

1949 film by William A. Berke

- Theatrical release poster
- Directed by: William Berke
- Screenplay by: Don Martin; Arthur Hoerl
- Story by: Arthur Hoerl
- Based on: Jungle Jim; 1934–1954 comic strip by Don Moore and Alex Raymond
- Produced by: Sam Katzman
- Starring: Johnny Weissmuller; Myrna Dell; Elena Verdugo
- Narrated by: Holmes Herbert
- Cinematography: Ira Morgan
- Edited by: Aaron Stell
- Music by: Mischa Bakaleinikoff
- Production company: King Features Syndicate
- Distributed by: Columbia Pictures
- Release date: May 3, 1949
- Running time: 72 minutes
- Country: United States
- Language: English

The Lost Tribe (1949) is the second Jungle Jim film produced by Columbia Pictures. The film features Johnny Weissmuller in his second performance as the adventurer Jungle Jim, co-starring Myrna Dell and Elena Verdugo, along with Joseph Vitale and George J. Lewis as the film's antagonists. It was directed by William Berke and written by Don Martin and Arthur Hoerl.

The film follows Jungle Jim struggling to protect a legendary African city from harm and exploitation. Filming took place in September 1948. The film was theatrically released in the United States in May 1949.

== Plot ==
The fabled city of Dzamm in Africa is rumoured to be a land of wealth. Looking to exploit its rich resources, Captain Rawlings (Ralph "Eddie" Dunn) dispatches two of his henchmen (Wally West and George DeNomand) to find the hidden trail to the city. After killing a few natives of Dzamm along the way, the inept servants of Rawlings are eaten alive by a large pride of wild lions.

Nearby, jungle roamer Jungle Jim (Weissmuller) receives Li Wanna (Verdugo), the daughter of Dzamm's chief religious official Zoron (Nelson Leigh). Li Wanna seeks Jungle Jim's help in fighting the mercenaries led by Rawlings. It is revealed that the rumour is indeed true—stashed in the temple of Dzamm are crates of precious stones. After hearing news of the murdered Dzamm natives, Jungle Jim and Li Wanna hurry to the scene, just to find the henchmen's corpses. Seeing the lions, the agile adventurer and Li Wanna climb up a tree to safety. An African elephant approaches, scaring the beastly cats away.

Jungle Jim and Li Wanna return to Zoron's residence, where they strategically discuss a peaceful resolution to get rid of Rawlings and his team. They come to the conclusion that giving Rawlings a few diamonds is the best idea. Meanwhile, Wanna's brother Chot (Paul Marion) is hypnotised by businessman Calhoun's (Vitale) niece Norina (Dell). Chot falls in love with Norina and unknowingly spills some secrets of Dzamm to her. Norina and Calhoun turn out to be under Rawling's payroll.

Jungle Jim befriends a gorilla (Ray Corrigan) after rescuing it and its offspring from a ferocious lion. He names it Zimba. After this, he prevents Calhoun from getting to know the trail to Dzamm but gets captured by Rawling's followers. An empathetic Norina is in the midst of setting him free when she gets killed by Calhoun. Luckily, Jim's pet fowl Caw Caw unties his ropes and with that, the voyager breaks loose and knocks out some of Rawlings' men. However, he is left with no choice but to tell Rawlings the way to Dzamm when Li Wanna, who was finding Jim, gets captured.

They make it to the temple of Dzamm. While the criminals are busy raiding the priceless relics and other treasures, Zimba and his fellow gorillas attack the temple robbers, most of whom are killed. Captain Rawlings and his accomplice Wilson (George J. Lewis) manage to escape, holding Jungle Jim captive, but are killed by Zimba. Chot, who has been shot and mortally wounded, asks for forgiveness before he dies. With Rawlings and his fellow looters dead for good, order in Dzamm is restored.

== Cast ==
- Johnny Weissmuller as Jungle Jim
- Myrna Dell as Norina
- Elena Verdugo as Li Wanna
- Joseph Vitale as Calhoun
- Ralph Dunn as Captain Rawlins
- Paul Marion as Chot
- Nelson Leigh as Zoron
- George J. Lewis as Steve "Whip" Wilson

== Production ==
The working title for the film was Jungle Jim's Adventure. Myrna Dell was cast in September 1948.

The film features an array of animal actors, including a crow and a dog. Ray Corrigan portrays Zimba, Jungle Jim's gorilla friend, with the film being shot at his Corriganville Movie Ranch.

The film was directed by William Berke with assistance from Wilbur McGaugh. Sam Katzman was in charge of production for Columbia Pictures, while Arthur Hoerl and Don Martin wrote the screenplay based on a story by Hoerl. Ira Morgan signed on as cinematographer. The set decorator was Sidney Clifford. Mischa Bakaleinikoff headed the musical direction, and Aaron Stell edited the film. Principal photography officially began on September 8, 1948, and ended on September 20, 1948.

== Release ==
The film was officially released in North American cinemas in May 1949.

The Motion Picture Herald commented that it was a "film providing a generous measure of the expected excitement", while a reviewer for the magazine Variety opined that it "will prove surefire entertainment for youthful filmgoers."

The Los Angeles Times called it "a veritable riot of unwitting comedy. It is probably one of the most ridiculous jungle features ever shown", adding that Weissmuller "needs to watch his waistline."

== Bibliography ==
- Michael R. Pitts (2010). Columbia Pictures Horror, Science Fiction and Fantasy Films, 1928–1982. McFarland. ISBN 978-0-7864-5766-3.
- Gene Blottner (2012). Columbia Pictures Movie Series, 1926–1955: The Harry Cohn Years. McFarland. ISBN 978-0-7864-3353-7.
