= Cannibal Attack =

1954 American film directed by Lee Sholem

- Theatrical release poster
- Directed by: Lee Sholem
- Written by: Carroll Young
- Based on: Jungle Jim; 1934-1954 comic strip by Don Moore and Alex Raymond
- Produced by: Sam Katzman
- Starring: Johnny Weissmuller; David Bruce; Bruce Cowling
- Cinematography: Henry Freulich
- Edited by: Edwin Bryant
- Music by: Mischa Bakaleinikoff
- Production company: Columbia Pictures
- Distributed by: Columbia Pictures
- Release date: November 1, 1954
- Running time: 68 minutes
- Country: United States
- Language: English

Cannibal Attack is a 1954 American adventure film, the fourteenth film in a series of jungle-based adventures from Columbia Pictures starring Johnny Weissmuller, the first thirteen of which feature the comic strip character Jungle Jim. It is the first of three films featuring Weismuller as an idealized version of himself, clearly based on the Jungle Jim character. The film also features Judy Walsh. It was directed by Lee Sholem and written by Carroll Young. Filmed at the Los Angeles County Arboretum and Botanic Garden, there are no cannibals in the film

The story follows the character Weissmuller battling cannibal looters trying to steal shipments of cobalt. It was theatrically released in North American cinemas in November 1954.

== Plot ==
Jungle roamer Johnny Weissmuller (playing himself) is exploring the African waters of Magi somewhere in mid-Cannibal Valley. While doing so, he stumbles upon a corpse apparently killed by a crocodile. Weissmuller decides to report the death to John King, leader of the white colony in the Magi. King is in charge of mining cobalt for the government, and confides to Weissmuller that recently a few shipments were stolen by looters passing off as crocodiles.

Returning to work, Weissmuller is ambushed by the looters, natives of Magi. He escapes from their clutches unscathed and sets out to recover the stolen cobalt. After a series of unfortunate events, including getting in the way of a giant-sized eagle, Weissmuller discovers a cave filled with the looted goods. He finds out from a Magi native, Luora, that the cobalt hoarders are members of the tribal clan, the Shenzis. They wish to gain more power by stealing the cobalt supplies, as well as end John King's reign.

Weissmuller contacts the police commissioner and personally confronts King, who he believes has a part in the looting. King is revealed to be part-Shenzi and under interrogation, admits to having masterminded the cobalt robberies. There is a brief struggle which results in King accidentally being killed. The other accomplices are promptly arrested. A new colony leader is selected and order in the Cannibal Valley is restored.

== Cast ==
- Johnny Weissmuller as himself
- David Bruce as Arnold King
- Judy Walsh as Luora
- Steve Darrell as John King (credited as Stevan Darrell)
- Charles Evans as Commissioner
- Bruce Cowling as Rovak
- Joseph Allen as Jason (credited as Joseph A. Allen Jr.)
- Kimba as Kimba The Chimp (the chimpanzee, originally named Tamba)

== Production ==
The film marked the first time Johnny Weissmuller used his own name, due to copyright issues concerning the use of the name "Jungle Jim". It was specified that Weissmuller did not play himself, rather a fictional character bearing the same name he had. Nevertheless, Cannibal Attack and the remaining two films which followed are still recognized by some as part of Columbia's Jungle Jim film series. His character does not wear his usual slouch hat and his chimp has been renamed Kimba from the former Tamba. Lee Sholem directed the film, while Carroll Young wrote both the story and the screenplay. Sam Katzman was in charge of production for Columbia Pictures. Edwin Bryant edited the film and Henry Freulich signed on as cinematographer. Mischa Bakaleinikoff headed the musical direction. Judy Walsh, who was cast as Luora, was loaned by RKO Studios where she was on contract.

== Release ==
Cannibal Attack was officially released in the United States in November 1954. A reviewer for the magazine Variety opined that the "pretentious" film catered only to "juvenile audiences", while the Motion Picture Guide found it to be "pretty decent". In evaluating the film in his 2012 book Columbia Pictures Movie Series, 1926—1955: The Harry Cohn Years, Gene Blottner dubbed the film a "winner", lauding Sholem's directing skills as well as the cast's effort.

== Bibliography ==
- David E. Wilt (January 1, 1991). Hardboiled in Hollywood. Popular Press. ISBN 978-0-87972-525-9.
- Leonard Maltin (1995). Leonard Maltin's Movie and Video Guide. Plume. ISBN 9780452273276.
- Mikita Brottman (October 1, 2001). Meat Is Murder!: An Illustrated Guide to Cannibal Culture. Creation. ISBN 978-1-84068-040-9.
- Gene Blottner (2012). Columbia Pictures Movie Series, 1926—1955: The Harry Cohn Years. McFarland. ISBN 978-0-7864-3353-7.
- Paul Mavis (May 31, 2013). The Espionage Filmography. McFarland. ISBN 978-1-4766-0427-5.
