= Valley of the Head Hunters =

1953 film by William A. Berke

Valley of the Head Hunters (aka Valley of Head Hunters)
- Directed by: William Berke
- Based on: Jungle Jim; 1934-1954 comic strip by Don Moore and Alex Raymond
- Produced by: Sam Katzman
- Starring: Johnny Weissmuller
- Cinematography: William P. Whitley
- Edited by: Gene Havlick
- Music by: Mischa Bakaleinikoff
- Production company: The Katzman Corporation
- Distributed by: Columbia Pictures
- Release date: July 23, 1953
- Running time: 67 minutes
- Country: United States
- Language: English

Valley of the Head Hunters (reissued as Valley of Head Hunters) is a 1953 adventure film directed by William Berke and starring Johnny Weissmuller in his eleventh appearance as Jungle Jim.

== Plot ==
The District Commissioner sends out his representatives to have the native chiefs sign their lands over to the Crown for mineral exploration and mining. A small criminal syndicate seek the land themselves to gain the oil concessions. To obtain the land for themselves and eliminate the unwilling native chiefs they create a sham headhunter tribe.

== Cast ==
- Johnny Weissmuller as Jungle Jim
- Christine Larson as Ellen Shaw
- Robert Foulk as Arco
- Steven Ritch as Lieutenant Barry
- Nelson Leigh as Mr. Bradley
- Joseph Allen as Pico
- George Eldredge as District Commissioner Kingston
