= Pygmy Island =

1950 film by William A. Berke

- Directed by: William Berke
- Written by: Carroll Young
- Based on: Jungle Jim; 1934-1954 comic strip by Don Moore and Alex Raymond
- Produced by: Sam Katzman
- Starring: Johnny Weissmuller; Ann Savage; Billy Curtis
- Cinematography: Ira H. Morgan
- Edited by: Jerome Thoms
- Music by: Mischa Bakaleinikoff
- Production company: King Features Syndicate
- Distributed by: Columbia Pictures
- Release date: November 22, 1950
- Running time: 69 mins
- Country: United States
- Language: English

Pygmy Island is a 1950 Jungle Jim adventure film, the fifth in the series, starring Johnny Weissmuller as the title character.

== Cast ==
- Johnny Weissmuller as Jungle Jim
- Ann Savage as Captain Ann R. Kingsley
- David Bruce as Major Bolton
- Steven Geray as Leon Marko
- William Tannen as Kruger
- Tristram Coffin as Novak
- Billy Curtis as Makuba

== Production ==
Filming began on June 19, 1950 and lasted for 14 days. Katzman hired several midget actors to play pygmies.
