= Killer Ape =

1953 film by Spencer Gordon Bennet

- Theatrical release poster
- Directed by: Spencer G. Bennet
- Screenplay by: Samuel Newman
- Based on: Jungle Jim; 1934-1954 comic strip by Don Moore and Alex Raymond
- Produced by: Sam Katzman
- Starring: Johnny Weissmuller; Carol Thurston
- Cinematography: William Whitley
- Edited by: Gene Havlick
- Music by: Mischa Bakaleinikoff
- Production company: Columbia Pictures
- Distributed by: Columbia Pictures
- Release date: December 1953
- Running time: 68 minutes
- Country: United States
- Language: English

Killer Ape (1953) is the twelfth Jungle Jim film produced by Columbia Pictures. It features Johnny Weissmuller in his twelfth performance as the protagonist adventurer Jungle Jim. Carol Thurston also stars. The film was directed by Spencer G. Bennet and written by Arthur Hoerl and Carroll Young.

The film centers on Jungle Jim battling a man-like ape in the jungle and trying to clear his name after he is framed of murder. The film was theatrically released in the United States in December 1953.

== Plot ==
Noticing many jungle animals behaving in an unnatural manner, adventurer Jungle Jim (Johnny Weissmuller) sends a few of them for laboratory testing. It is revealed that diabolical scientist Doctor Andrews (Nestor Paiva) is behind the deed. Andrews is intent on formulating a deadly drug that would make any creature injected with it succumb in a matter of seconds. Jim, who is unaware of Andrews' plans, spots him near the Canyon of the Man Ape. The jungle explorer advises him to leave quickly, as rumour has it that a creature (Max Palmer), half-man and half-ape, roams the canyon's grounds. Andrews does not heed the warning, and his laboratory in the jungle gets obliterated by the legendary "Killer Ape".

Jungle Jim later meets Mahura, leader of the tribal Wazuli clan. Jim also warns him of the Killer Ape, but Mahura wishes to see it for himself to believe him. He ventures into the canyon, and meets the enraged monster in the flesh. Jim comes to Mahura's aid but is knocked out cold by the beast. The Killer Ape proceeds to kill the tribal chief. Shari (Carol Thurston), Mahura's daughter, and Ramada (Burt Wenland), Shari's spouse, both accuse Jim of murdering Mahura. When Jim vehemently denies doing so, a heated squabble ensues. Jim sneaks away but is chased by Shari. Just then, the Killer Ape reappears and tries to kill Shari, only to be scared off by Jim.

Meanwhile, Ramada has learnt of Andrews' scheme and decides not to let him harm the jungle animals anymore. Ireful, Andrews orders for his men to kidnap both Ramada and a tribal Elder (Eddie Foster). Jungle Jim also gets caught while trying to rescue the captured duo. When the Killer Ape re-bags Shari and returns to the canyon, they are both abducted too. Jim's pet chimpanzee Tamba ropes in his fellow ape friends and together they storm into Andrews' retreat. The captured become freed. The Killer Ape angrily massacres all of Andrews' henchmen and lets the doctor be mauled to death by a panther. It then changes its motive when it sees Shari. Attempting to drag her away, its plans are permanently halted by Jim, who burns it alive. In the aftermath, Jim receives a medal for ridding the Killer Ape.

== Cast ==
- Johnny Weissmuller as Jungle Jim
- Carol Thurston as Shari
- Max Palmer as Man Ape
- Burt Wenland as Ramada
- Nestor Paiva as Andrews
- Paul Marion as Mahara
- Eddie Foster as Achmed
- Rory Mallinson as Perry
- Ray Corrigan as Norley
- Nick Stuart as Maron
- Tamba as Tamba The Chimp

== Production ==
Johnny Weissmuller returned as Jungle Jim for the twelfth time. Max Palmer was cast as the title "Killer Ape". The then-owner of the movie ranch Corriganville, American actor Ray "Crash" Corrigan, made a cameo appearance in the film. The film was directed by Spencer G. Bennet with assistance from Carter DeHaven. Sam Katzman was in charge of production for Columbia Pictures, while Carroll Young and Arthur Hoerl wrote the screenplay, based on a story by Young. William Whitley signed on as cinematographer. The set decorator was Sidney Clifford. Mischa Bakaleinikoff headed the musical direction, and Gene Havlick edited the film. Filming began on February 5, 1953, and ended on February 12, 1953. Scenes were filmed at Corriganville. Archived footage from Captive Girl (1950) was incorporated in the film for a scene involving primates ambushing a scientist's retreat.

== Release ==
The film was officially released in North American cinemas in December 1953. It was released in the United Kingdom in May 1954 and in Australia on January 6, 1955. Variety wrote that the film was "[a] stereotyped entry in Johnny Weissmuller's 'Jungle Jim' series of programmers". The Columbia Story commented that "more talk than action characterized this adventure", while the Motion Picture Guide found it to be "a cliché tour-de-force replete with bad acting and apathetic direction".

== Bibliography ==
- John Reid (September 1, 2005). HOLLYWOOD 'B' MOVIES: A Treasury of Spills, Chills & Thrills. Lulu.com. ISBN 978-1-4116-5065-7.
- Michael R. Pitts (2010). Columbia Pictures Horror, Science Fiction and Fantasy Films, 1928—1982. McFarland. ISBN 978-0-7864-5766-3.
- Gene Blottner (2012). Columbia Pictures Movie Series, 1926—1955: The Harry Cohn Years. McFarland. ISBN 978-0-7864-3353-7.
