= Captive Girl =

1950 film

- Italian film poster
- Directed by: William Berke
- Written by: Carroll Young (written for the screen by)
- Based on: Jungle Jim; 1934-1954 comic strip by Don Moore and Alex Raymond
- Produced by: Sam Katzman
- Starring: Johnny Weissmuller
- Cinematography: Ira H. Morgan
- Edited by: Henry Batista
- Music by: Mischa Bakaleinikoff
- Production company: The Katzman Company
- Distributed by: Columbia Pictures
- Release dates: April 27, 1950 (premiere); July 1950 (United States)
- Running time: 73 minutes
- Country: United States
- Language: English

Captive Girl is the fourth Jungle Jim film produced by Columbia Pictures. Directed by William Berke, it stars Johnny Weissmuller as the title character. The film is also Weissmuller's second teaming with Buster Crabbe after Swamp Fire (1946). Captive Girl is the only feature film appearance of Anita Lhoest, a swimming champion and cellist.

== Plot ==
Jungle Jim is summoned to a mission in a different jungle area. He is to escort Chief Mahala, returning after studying in the West, to regain the leadership of his tribe. His second mission is to investigate a mysterious blonde witch who has a pet tiger. It is believed that the witch is actually Joan Martindale, the child of a long-missing couple. In his absence, Chief Mahala's leadership has been usurped by the evil witch doctor Hakim, who seeks to kill the witch.

Hakim keeps his power by making sacrifices of prisoners bound in gold chains and jewels who are thrown into the Lagoon of the Dead. These victims included the Martindales, with Hakim seeking Joan to prevent her testifying against him after Mahala gains control of the tribe. Using scuba gear, Barton seeks to gather the gold and jewels of the drowned victims for himself.

== Cast ==
- Johnny Weissmuller as Jungle Jim
- Buster Crabbe as Barton
- Anita Lhoest as Joan Martindale
- Rick Vallin as Chief Mahala
- John Dehner as Hakim
- Rusty Wescoatt as Silva
- Frank Lackteen as Village Elder
- Nelson Leigh as Reverend E.R. Holcom
