= Jungle Jim =

Fictional hero of a series of jungle adventures

- Alex Raymond's Jungle Jim (November 26, 1939)
- Author: Don W. Moore (1934–1954)
- Illustrator(s): Alex Raymond (1934–1944); John Mayo (1944– ) Paul Norris (1948–1954)
- Current status/schedule: Sunday; concluded
- Launch date: January 7, 1934
- End date: August 8, 1954
- Syndicate: King Features Syndicate
- Genre: Adventure

Jungle Jim is the fictional hero of a series of jungle adventures in various media. The series began on January 7, 1934, as an American newspaper comic strip chronicling the adventures of Asia-based hunter Jim Bradley, who was nicknamed Jungle Jim. The character trekked through radio, film, comic book and television adaptations. Notable is a series of films and television episodes in which Johnny Weissmuller portrayed the safari-suit wearing character, after he concluded his run portraying Tarzan. The strip ended on August 8, 1954.

== Publication history ==
The strip was created by King Features Syndicate in order to compete with the popular United Feature Syndicate comic strip Tarzan, by Hal Foster.

Illustrator Alex Raymond and pulp magazine author Don W. Moore created the original strip as a topper to run above Raymond's Flash Gordon. Jungle Jim and Flash Gordon were launched simultaneously on January 7, 1934. The character was named after Alex's brother Jim Raymond.

During World War II, Raymond enlisted as a Marine. Successors included John Mayo (creator of Future Eye) and Paul Norris (creator of DC Comics' Aquaman). Moore continued to script through the succession of artists. The strip, which never ran as a daily, came to an end in 1954.

Alex Raymond's Jungle Jim (March 15, 1936)

From 1937 to 1947, the comic strip was reprinted in Ace Comics, published by David McKay. From 1949 to 1951, there were 11 original Jungle Jim comic books produced by Standard Comics. Dell Comics published 20 issues of Jungle Jim from 1953 to 1959; the last eight issues (#13–20) were written by Gaylord Du Bois.

King Features Syndicate published a single issue of Jungle Jim in 1967. This is designated #5 and is a reprint of Dell's issue #5 with a new cover by Wally Wood. Charlton Comics then picked up Dell's numbering for another seven issues (#22–28) in 1969–70 with stories scripted by Wood, Pat Boyette, Bhob Stewart, Joe Gill and others. Artists on the Charlton stories were Wood, Boyette, Steve Ditko, Roger Brand and Tom Palmer.

In January 2015, Dynamite Entertainment announced a new series of Jungle Jim as part of their "King:Dynamite" series. This version of Jungle Jim is written by Paul Tobin and illustrated by Sandy Jarrell.

== Characters and story ==
Unlike the protagonists of Tarzan, Ka-Zar, Kaanga and other comics with jungle themes, Jim Bradley is based in Southeastern Asia rather than Africa, and he is a hunter rather than a wild man in a loincloth.

Other characters include the large, strong native Kolu (who served his white comrade Jim in a manner somewhat similar to the character of Lothar in Mandrake the Magician). The femme fatale Lille DeVrille was added to the cast two years after the strip's debut.

The comic's early years generally feature stories revolving around pirates, slave traders and other common jungle antagonists. As World War II approached, Jungle Jim, like many American comics, developed a wartime theme, with Jim fighting the Japanese, and it moved from its position as a topper strip to its own independent Sunday page.

== Other media ==
=== Radio ===
Syndicated by Hearst and sponsored by the Comic Weekly, The Adventures of Jungle Jim radio series premiered November 2, 1935. Matt Crowley had the title role for three years, until Gerald Mohr stepped in as Jungle Jim beginning April 24, 1938. Vicki Vola and Franc Hale portrayed Shanghai Lil, and Juano Hernandez was the Hindu servant Kolu. Each episode ran 15 minutes. Several episodes were based directly on the comic strip, such as The Ghost of the Java Sea. Gene Stafford scripted for producer Jay Clark. Glenn Riggs was the announcer, among others. In the opening episode, "The Bat Woman," Jungle Jim meets Miss Chalmers, and Jacques LaBarr gets into a barroom fight with Jim.

=== Serial ===
- A 12-part Jungle Jim movie serial by Universal Pictures, starring Grant Withers, was released in 1937.

=== Feature films ===
- Columbia Pictures produced a series of 13 Jungle Jim B-movies from 1948 to 1954, set in Africa and starring Johnny Weissmuller, who had gained fame playing Tarzan. Beginning in 1954, the rights to the name "Jungle Jim" shifted to Columbia's Screen Gems for the production of a television series, also starring Weissmuller. Following the loss of the license, three additional movies were made in much the same vein, but with the main character being "Johnny Weissmuller", with Weissmuller essentially playing an idealized version of himself, much like the cowboy stars Roy Rogers and Gene Autry.

The Official Jungle Jim Annual #1 Comic

1. Jungle Jim (1948)
2. The Lost Tribe (1949)
3. Mark of the Gorilla (1950)
4. Captive Girl (1950) co-starred Buster Crabbe
5. Pygmy Island (1950)
6. Fury of the Congo (1951)
7. Jungle Manhunt (1951)
8. Jungle Jim in the Forbidden Land (1952)
9. Voodoo Tiger (1952)
10. Savage Mutiny (1953)
11. Valley of Head Hunters (1953)
12. Killer Ape (1953)
13. Jungle Man-Eaters (1954)

"Johnny Weissmuller" films

1. Cannibal Attack (1954)
2. Jungle Moon Men (1955)
3. Devil Goddess (1955)

=== TV series ===
- A single-season Screen Gems television series, Jungle Jim, starring Weissmuller, ran from 1955 to 1956, consisting of 26 episodes.

== Comic strip reprints ==
- Jungle Jim. Street Enterprises Menomonee Falls, Wis., 1971 (reprints July 14 – October 27, 1935 strips)
- Jungle Jim. Pacific Comics Club, Papeete, Tahiti (reprints April 12, 1936 – June 30, 1937)
- Jungle Jim. Pacific Comics Club, Papeete, Tahiti (reprints March 20, 1938, – August 7, 1938)
- Jungle Jim. Pacific Comics Club, Papeete, Tahiti (reprints August 14, 1938 – May 21, 1939)
- Jungle Jim. Pacific Comics Club, Papeete, Tahiti (reprints September 15, 1940 – May 4, 1941)
- Jungle Jim. Pacific Comics Club, Papeete, Tahiti (reprints June 15, 1941– 20 December 1942)
- The Official Jungle Jim Annual. : Pioneer Comics, Las Vegas, NV 1989
- The Official Jungle Jim Sundays: v. 1 Pioneer Comics, Las Vegas, NV, 1989 (reprints July 14, 1935 – May 16, 1937)
- The Official Jungle Jim Sundays: v. 2, Death In The Jungle Pioneer Comics, Las Vegas, NV, 1989 (reprints May 16, 1937 – March 12, 1939)
- Definitive Flash Gordon and Jungle Jim Volume 1: 1934–1936 San Diego, Calif. IDW Publishing. ISBN 1-61377-015-4
- Definitive Flash Gordon and Jungle Jim Volume 2: 1936–1939 San Diego, Calif. IDW Publishing ISBN 1-61377-220-3
- Definitive Flash Gordon and Jungle Jim Volume 3: 1939–1941 San Diego, Calif. IDW Publishing ISBN 1-61377-580-6
- Definitive Flash Gordon and Jungle Jim Volume 4: 1942–1944 San Diego, Calif. IDW Publishing ISBN 1-61377-917-8

== Merchandise ==
In 1957, Louis Marx and Company marketed a Jungle Jim playset with character figures and generic jungle figures (hunters, natives, wild animals).

== See also ==
- Congo Bill
- Bomba the Jungle Boy
- Ramar of the Jungle
- Tarzanesque
