= Voodoo Tiger =

1952 film by Spencer Gordon Bennet

- Theatrical release poster
- Directed by: Spencer G. Bennet
- Screenplay by: Samuel Newman
- Based on: Jungle Jim; 1934-1954 comic strip by Don Moore and Alex Raymond
- Produced by: Sam Katzman
- Starring: Johnny Weissmuller; Jean Byron
- Cinematography: William Whitley
- Edited by: Gene Havlick
- Music by: Mischa Bakaleinikoff
- Production company: Sam Katzman Productions
- Distributed by: Columbia Pictures
- Release date: November 1952
- Running time: 67 minutes
- Country: United States
- Language: English

Voodoo Tiger is a 1952 American adventure film directed by Spencer G. Bennet and starring Johnny Weissmuller in his ninth performance as the protagonist adventurer Jungle Jim. It was written by Samuel Newman and produced by Columbia Pictures. It features James Seay as the film's antagonist. Jean Byron also stars.

The plot concerns Jungle Jim battling a team of art thieves in an African jungle inhabited by tiger god worshippers. The film was theatrically released in the United States in November 1952.

== Plot ==
Adventurer Jungle Jim (Johnny Weissmuller) and Sergeant Bono (Rick Vallin) are taking the British Museum's Phyllis Bruce (Jean Byron) on a tour around an African jungle. They come to witness a sacrificial ritual about to take place. Jungle Jim hurriedly prevents chief religious official Wombulu (Charles Horvath) from slaughtering an African native as an offering to the tiger god Tambura. The furious voodoo practitioner lunges for Jungle Jim with a knife, only to be shot by hunter Abel Peterson (James Seay). Peterson invites Jim, Bono, and Bruce to stay at his lodging. However, Jim receives a last-minute notification that Major Bill Green of the United States (Robert Bray) has come with Commissioner Kingston (Richard Kipling) to meet businessman Karl Werner (Michael Fox). The two army personnel are looking to recover a stolen collection of artworks. Werner, who operates in the jungle, is believed to possess knowledge of the artworks' whereabouts. Jim is assigned to lead the way to Werner.

Werner claims to not know anything about the looted art pieces; Green rebuts him by labelling him as a "Nazi" who aided the looters. Just then, Green spots Peterson and his men, who happen to be passing by. The army major informs Jim that they are actually notorious thieves specialising in artworks. The two camps battle and at last it is Peterson's team which prevails. Werner, Green, Kingston, and Jim are locked up in a cupboard. Werner somehow breaks loose and makes his way to the airfield. He dashes up the plane Peterson and his henchmen are planning to escape on. After overpowering the pilot, he captains the plane himself and flies back to the jungle. The plane catches fire just as it is reaching the destination. Werner courageously jumps out, along with an exotic dancer who happens to be on board too. Her tiger also lands in the jungle. The natives, who are about to massacre Jim, see the tiger and kneel on their knees, believing it to be Tambura.

Meanwhile, Wombulu and Peterson have started an alliance. They hatch a plan to kidnap Werner. At the same time, Jungle Jim and his acquaintances have escaped. Jim's eagle-eyed pet chimpanzee, Tamba, spots an obscure dynamite trap laid out for them; Jim defuses it. From afar they see the dancer's tiger on a wild rampage. As more natives get killed by the tiger, Peterson grabs Werner and runs away. Jungle Jim stops Peterson in his tracks and rescues Werner from the hunter's clutches. The enraged African natives run towards Peterson and his men, killing them. Jim and the rest barely manage to escape. The jungle explorer quick-wittedly resets the dynamite trap. It explodes and kills the natives. With the voodoo tribe dissolved, Major Green professes his love for Bruce.

== Cast ==
- Johnny Weissmuller as Jungle Jim
- Rick Vallin as Sergeant Bono
- Charles Horvath as Wombulu
- Jean Byron as Phyllis
- James Seay as Abel Peterson
- Michael Fox as Karl Werner
- Richard Kipling as Commissioner Kingston
- Robert Bray as Major Green

== Production ==
The film was the first of a new three-year deal between Sam Katzman and King Features.

Johnny Weissmuller returned as Jungle Jim for the ninth time. The film marked Jean Byron's film debut. She played Phyllis Bruce. The film was directed by Spencer G. Bennet with assistance from Charles S. Gould. Sam Katzman was in charge of production for Columbia Pictures, while Samuel Newman wrote the screenplay. William Whitley signed on as cinematographer. The set decorator was Sidney Clifford. Mischa Bakaleinikoff headed the musical direction, and Gene Havlick edited the film. Filming began on June 9, 1952, and ended on June 17, 1952. Scenes were filmed at Corriganville. The film incorporated archived footage from Bring 'Em Back Alive (1932) for scenes involving tigers.

== Release and reception ==
The film was officially released in North American cinemas in November 1952. The Hollywood Reporter found the film to be "[having] movement and suspense in spades", while Variety opined that it "stacks up okay as a program filler". The Columbia Story described the film as "moribund".

== Bibliography ==
- Michael R. Pitts (2010). Columbia Pictures Horror, Science Fiction and Fantasy Films, 1928—1982. McFarland. ISBN 978-0-7864-5766-3.
- Gene Blottner (2012). Columbia Pictures Movie Series, 1926—1955: The Harry Cohn Years. McFarland. ISBN 978-0-7864-3353-7.
