= Jungle Jim (TV series) =

American television series

- Starring: Johnny Weissmuller; Martin Huston; Dean Fredericks; Paul Cavanagh
- Country of origin: United States
- Original language: English
- No. of series: 1
- No. of episodes: 26

Production
- Production company: Screen Gems

Original release
- Network: Syndication
- Release: September 26, 1955 – March 19, 1956

Jungle Jim is a 1955–56 American TV series based on the Jungle Jim newspaper comic strip. It stars Johnny Weissmuller, who had previously played the character in a series of thirteen theatrically released Jungle Jim feature films, which were produced soon after he retired from the Tarzan film series in 1948 for which he is best remembered.

The Jungle Jim TV show premiered on September 26, 1955, and ended its 26-episode run on March 19, 1956. It ran for 26 episodes and was produced by Screen Gems who sold it into syndication.

== Cast ==
- Johnny Weissmuller as Jungle Jim
- Martin Huston as Skipper
- Dean Fredericks as Kaseem
- Tamba as Tamba The Chimp
- Paul Cavanagh as Commissioner Morrison

== Episodes ==
No.	Title	Directed by	Written by	Original release date
1	"Man Killer"	Donald McDougall	Dwight Babcock	September 26, 1955
2	"Land of Terror"	Earl Bellamy	Wallace Bosco	October 3, 1955
3	"Treasure of the Amazon"	Earl Bellamy	Malvin Wald	October 10, 1955
4	"Lagoon of Death"	Earl Bellamy	Wells Root	October 17, 1955
5	"A Fortune in Ivory"	Unknown	Unknown	October 24, 1955
6	"Jungle Justice"	Don McDougall	J. Benton Cheney	October 31, 1955
7	"The Eyes of Minobo"	Don McDougall	Harry Poppe, Jr.	November 7, 1955
8	"The King's Ghost"	Don McDougall	Malvin Wald	November 14, 1955
9	"White Magic"	Don McDougall	Story by : Wallace Bosco; Teleplay by : Robert Williams	November 21, 1955
10	"The Deadly Idol"	Don McDougall	Terence Maples	November 28, 1955
11	"The Leopard's Paw"	Unknown	Unknown	December 5, 1955
12	"Man from Zanzibar"	Unknown	Unknown	December 12, 1955
13	"Precious Cargo"	Unknown	Unknown	December 19, 1955
14	"The Golden Parasol"	Unknown	Unknown	December 26, 1955
15	"Code of the Jungle"	Unknown	Unknown	January 2, 1956
16	"Wild Man of the Jungle"	Unknown	Unknown	January 9, 1956
17	"Safari Into Danger"	Unknown	Unknown	January 16, 1956
18	"Blood Money"	Don McDougall	Lee Erwin	January 23, 1956
19	"Striped Fury"	Unknown	Unknown	January 30, 1956
20	"Scared Scarab"	Unknown	Unknown	February 6, 1956
21	"Voodoo Drums"	Unknown	Unknown	February 13, 1956
22	"The Avenger"	Unknown	Unknown	February 20, 1956
23	"Return of the Tuaregs"	Unknown	Unknown	February 27, 1956
24	"The Silver Locket"	Unknown	Unknown	March 5, 1956
25	"Gift of Evil"	Unknown	Unknown	March 12, 1956
26	"Power of Darkness"	Don McDougall	Story by : Wells Root; Teleplay by : Wells Root & J. Benton Cheney	March 19, 1956
