= Bomba the Jungle Boy (film) =

1949 film directed by Ford Beebe

- Directed by: Ford Beebe
- Screenplay by: Jack DeWitt
- Based on: Adapted from "Bomba, the Jungle Boy" by Roy Rockwood
- Produced by: Walter Mirisch
- Starring: Johnny Sheffield; Peggy Ann Garner; Onslow Stevens; Charles Irwin and introducing Oto, the Monkey
- Cinematography: William A. Sickner, A.S.C.
- Edited by: Roy Livingston
- Music by: Edward Kay (musical director)
- Color process: Black and white
- Production company: A Pembroke Production
- Distributed by: Monogram Pictures Corporation
- Release date: March 20, 1949
- Running time: 70 minutes
- Country: United States
- Language: English
- Budget: $85,000
- Box office: $500,000 est.

Bomba, the Jungle Boy is a 1949 American adventure film directed by Ford Beebe, based on the first (published in 1926) of the Bomba series of juvenile adventure books by Roy Rockwood. It was the first in a 12-film series featuring Bomba, a sort of teenage Tarzan, played by Johnny Sheffield, who as a child had played "Boy" in several previous Tarzan films.

== Plot ==
A photographer and his daughter arrive in Africa hoping to capture the local wildlife on film. Instead, they encounter (and never end up photographing) a killer leopard, a swarm of locusts, deadly lion worshippers, and Bomba the Jungle Boy.

Bomba was raised by an aged naturalist, Cody Casson (since deceased). He now lives beyond the Great Rift. The photographer's daughter, wearing a well-tailored leopard skin, spends most of the film with Bomba, while her father, Commissioner Barnes, and Eli search for her.

== Cast ==
- Johnny Sheffield as Bomba
- Peggy Ann Garner as Patricia Harland
- Onslow Stevens as George Harland
- Charles Irwin as Andy Barnes
- Smoki Whitfield as Eli
- Martin Wilkins as Mufti
- Blue Washington as native bearer (uncredited)

== Production ==
Walter Mirisch had been general manager of Monogram Pictures since 1945. They specialized in low-budget movies, including series of regular characters such as Charlie Chan, Joe Palooka and the The Bowery Boys. Mirisch looked at the success of the Tarzan films and remembered the Bomba novels; he thought they might offer material to do a similar type of movie.

In November 1947 Monogram announced they had bought the rights to twenty of the stories. They assigned Walter Mirisch to oversee their production and said they intended to make three Bomba films per year. They were going to be in color. They were seeking a male actor aged 18 to 20 to star.

In September 1948 Monogram's president Steve Broidy announced that the studio would make two Bomba films over the following year. (Other series at the studio included Joe Palooka, Charlie Chan and The Bowery Boys.)

Mirisch later claimed he was paid $2,500 a film, and the success of the series launched him as a producer.

== Reception ==
The New York Times called it a "dull flavorless picture about a vest pocket Tarzan." However the movie was a large success relative to its budget.

== List of the 12 "Bomba" Feature Films ==
(Note* - Johnny Sheffield plays Bomba in all 12 films)

1. Bomba, the Jungle Boy (1949) with Peggy Ann Garner and Onslow Stevens
2. Bomba on Panther Island (1949) with Allene Roberts
3. The Lost Volcano (1950) with Elena Verdugo
4. Bomba and the Hidden City (1950) with Sue England
5. The Lion Hunters (1951) with Morris Ankrum and Ann Todd
6. Elephant Stampede (1952) with Donna Martell and Myron Healey
7. African Treasure (1952) with Lyle Talbot and Arthur Space
8. Bomba and the Jungle Girl (1952) with Karen Sharpe
9. Safari Drums (1953) with Emory Parnell
10. The Golden Idol (1954) with Anne Kimbell
11. Killer Leopard (1954) with Beverly Garland
12. Lord of the Jungle (1955) with Wayne Morris
