= Otho Lovering =

American film editor (1892–1968)

- Born: Otto Scott Levering; December 1, 1892; Philadelphia, Pennsylvania, U.S.
- Died: October 25, 1968 (aged 75); Santa Monica, California, U.S.
- Occupation: Film editor
- Spouse: Edna A. Lovering

Otho Lovering (December 1, 1892 – October 25, 1968) was an American filmmaker with about eighty editing credits on feature films and television programs.

== Biography ==
Born in 1892, he was the son of Frank Lovering, a stenographer, and Georgia Lovering. He worked for Vitagraph Studios as a film printing foreman, according to his 1917 World War I draft registration card.

A highlight of Lovering's career was his editing of director John Ford's classic Western film Stagecoach (1939). Lovering's co-editor was Dorothy Spencer, with whom Lovering had already edited several films starting in 1937. The pair were nominated for the Academy Award for Best Film Editing for the film. Over 20 years later, Ford picked Lovering as his editor again following the 1961 death of Jack Murray, who had edited most of Ford's films in the 1940s and 1950s. Lovering edited four films, from The Man Who Shot Liberty Valance (1962) through Ford's last feature film, 7 Women (1966).

== Filmography ==
This filmography is based on the listing at the Internet Movie Database; credits are for editing unless indicated.

Editor
Year	Film	Director	Notes	Other notes
1928	Sporting Goods	Malcolm St. Clair		
1928	Easy Come, Easy Go	Frank Tuttle	First collaboration with Frank Tuttle	
1928	Warming Up	Fred C. Newmeyer		
1928	The Sawdust Paradise	Luther Reed		
1928	Moran of the Marines	Frank R. Strayer		
1928	Take Me Home	Marshall Neilan		
1929	Redskin	Victor Schertzinger	First collaboration with Victor Schertzinger	
1929	The Wild Party	Dorothy Arzner		Uncredited
1929	The Wheel of Life	Victor Schertzinger	Second collaboration with Victor Schertzinger	
1929	The Mighty	John Cromwell	First collaboration with John Cromwell	
1930	Street of Chance	John Cromwell	Second collaboration with John Cromwell	
1930	The Social Lion	A. Edward Sutherland		Uncredited
1930	Manslaughter	George Abbott		
1930	Anybody's War	Richard Wallace		
1930	The Virtuous Sin	George Cukor; Louis J. Gasnier		
1931	The Conquering Horde	Edward Sloman		Uncredited
1932	Devil and the Deep	Marion Gering		Uncredited
1932	A Farewell to Arms	Frank Borzage		Uncredited
1932	No Man of Her Own	Wesley Ruggles	First collaboration with Wesley Ruggles	Uncredited
1933	A Bedtime Story	Norman Taurog		Uncredited
1933	I'm No Angel	Wesley Ruggles	Second collaboration with Wesley Ruggles	Uncredited
1934	All of Me	James Flood	First collaboration with James Flood	Uncredited
1934	You're Telling Me!	Erle C. Kenton		Uncredited
1934	We Live Again	Rouben Mamoulian		
1935	The Gilded Lily	Wesley Ruggles	Third collaboration with Wesley Ruggles	
1935	Stolen Harmony	Alfred L. Werker		
1935	Shanghai	James Flood	Second collaboration with James Flood	
1935	Accent on Youth	Wesley Ruggles	Fourth collaboration with Wesley Ruggles	
1936	Valiant Is the Word for Carrie	Wesley Ruggles	Fifth collaboration with Wesley Ruggles	
1937	I Met Him in Paris	Wesley Ruggles	Sixth collaboration with Wesley Ruggles	
1937	Vogues of 1938	Irving Cummings		
1937	Stand-In	Tay Garnett	First collaboration with Tay Garnett	
1938	I Met My Love Again	Joshua Logan; Arthur Ripley		
1938	Blockade	William Dieterle		
1938	Algiers	John Cromwell	Third collaboration with John Cromwell	
1938	Trade Winds	Tay Garnett	Second collaboration with Tay Garnett	
1939	Stagecoach	John Ford	First collaboration with John Ford	
1939	Winter Carnival	Charles Reisner		
1939	Eternally Yours	Tay Garnett	Third collaboration with Tay Garnett	
1942	Jacaré	Charles E. Ford		
1947	Joe Palooka in the Knockout	Reginald LeBorg	First collaboration with Reginald LeBorg	
1948	The Hunted	Jack Bernhard		
1948	I Wouldn't Be in Your Shoes	William Nigh		
1948	Joe Palooka in Winner Take All	Reginald LeBorg	Second collaboration with Reginald LeBorg	
1948	Smugglers' Cove	William Beaudine	Eighth collaboration with William Beaudine	
1949	Joe Palooka in the Big Fight	Cy Endfield		
1949	Fighting Fools	Reginald LeBorg	Fourth collaboration with Reginald LeBorg	
1949	Bomba, the Jungle Boy	Ford Beebe	First collaboration with Ford Beebe	
1949	Mississippi Rhythm	Derwin Abrahams	Second collaboration with Derwin Abrahams	
1949	Joe Palooka in the Counterpunch	Reginald LeBorg	Fifth collaboration with Reginald LeBorg	
1949	Bomba on Panther Island	Ford Beebe	Second collaboration with Ford Beebe	
1950	Blue Grass of Kentucky	William Beaudine	Tenth collaboration with William Beaudine	
1950	Joe Palooka Meets Humphrey	Jean Yarbrough	Third collaboration with Jean Yarbrough	
1950	Young Daniel Boone	Reginald LeBorg	Sixth collaboration with Reginald LeBorg	
1950	The Lost Volcano	Ford Beebe	Third collaboration with Ford Beebe	
1950	Short Grass	Lesley Selander	Second collaboration with Lesley Selander	
1951	Navy Bound	Paul Landres	Second collaboration with Paul Landres	
1951	The Lion Hunters	Ford Beebe	Fourth collaboration with Ford Beebe	
1951	Disc Jockey	Will Jason	Second collaboration with Will Jason	
1952	Jack and the Beanstalk	Jean Yarbrough	Third collaboration with Jean Yarbrough	
1962	The Man Who Shot Liberty Valance	John Ford	Second collaboration with John Ford	
1963	Donovan's Reef	John Ford	Third collaboration with John Ford	
1963	McLintock!	Andrew V. McLaglen	First collaboration with Andrew V. McLaglen	
1964	Law of the Lawless	William F. Claxton		
1964	Cheyenne Autumn	John Ford	Fourth collaboration with John Ford	
1965	Shenandoah	Andrew V. McLaglen	Second collaboration with Andrew V. McLaglen	
1965	7 Women	John Ford	Fifth collaboration with John Ford	
1966	Ride Beyond Vengeance	Bernard McEveety		
1966	The Last of the Secret Agents?	Norman Abbott		
1967	The Way West	Andrew V. McLaglen	Third collaboration with Andrew V. McLaglen	
1967	The Ballad of Josie	Andrew V. McLaglen	Fourth collaboration with Andrew V. McLaglen	
1968	The Green Berets	John Wayne; Ray Kellogg		
1969	Young Billy Young	Burt Kennedy	First collaboration with Burt Kennedy	
1969	The Good Guys and the Bad Guys	Burt Kennedy	Second collaboration with Burt Kennedy	Uncredited

Editorial department
Year	Film	Director	Role	Notes	Other notes
1939	Stagecoach	John Ford	Supervising editor		Uncredited
1939	Slightly Honorable	Tay Garnett	Supervising editor	Fourth collaboration with Tay Garnett	
1940	Foreign Correspondent	Alfred Hitchcock	Supervising editor		
1943	The Outlaw	Howard Hughes	Supervising editor		
1945	The Story of G.I. Joe	William A. Wellman	Supervising film editor		
1945	Pardon My Past	Leslie Fenton	Supervising editor		
1946	Abilene Town	Edwin L. Marin	Supervising editor		
1946	Suspense	Frank Tuttle	Supervising editor	Second collaboration with Frank Tuttle	
1947	Hard Boiled Mahoney	William Beaudine	Supervising film editor	First collaboration with William Beaudine	
1947	News Hounds	William Beaudine	Supervising film editor	Second collaboration with William Beaudine	
1947	Black Gold	Phil Karlson	Supervising editor		
1947	Bowery Buckaroos	William Beaudine	Supervising film editor	Third collaboration with William Beaudine	
1948	Song of My Heart	Benjamin Glazer	Supervising editor		
1948	Panhandle	Lesley Selander	Supervising film editor	First collaboration with Lesley Selander	
1948	Angels' Alley	William Beaudine	Supervising editor	Fourth collaboration with William Beaudine	
1948	Docks of New Orleans	Derwin Abrahams	Supervising editor	First collaboration with Derwin Abrahams	
1948	Campus Sleuth	Will Jason	Supervising editor	First collaboration with Will Jason	
1948	French Leave	Frank McDonald	Supervising editor		
1948	Smart Woman	Edward A. Blatt	Supervising editor		
1948	Jinx Money	William Beaudine	Supervising film editor	Fifth collaboration with William Beaudine	
1948	Shanghai Chest	William Beaudine	Supervising editor	Sixth collaboration with William Beaudine	
1948	Back Trail	Christy Cabanne	Supervising editor		Uncredited
1948	The Golden Eye	William Beaudine	Supervising editor	Seventh collaboration with William Beaudine	
1948	Music Man	Will Jason	Supervising editor	Second collaboration with Will Jason	
1948	Trouble Makers	Reginald LeBorg	Supervising film editor	Third collaboration with Reginald LeBorg	
1948	Jiggs and Maggie in Court	William Beaudine	Supervising editor	Ninth collaboration with William Beaudine	
1948	The Feathered Serpent	William Beaudine	Supervising editor	Tenth collaboration with William Beaudine	
1949	Bad Boy	Kurt Neumann	Supervising editor		
1949	Sky Dragon	Lesley Selander	Supervising editor	Second collaboration with Lesley Selander	
1949	Stampede	Lesley Selander	Supervising editor	Third collaboration with Lesley Selander	
1949	Across the Rio Grande	Oliver Drake	Supervising editor		Uncredited
1949	Hold That Baby!	Reginald LeBorg	Supervising film editor	Fifth collaboration with Reginald LeBorg	
1949	Jiggs and Maggie in Jackpot Jitters	William Beaudine	Supervising editor	Eleventh collaboration with William Beaudine	
1949	Angels in Disguise	Jean Yarbrough	Supervising film editor	First collaboration with Jean Yarbrough	
1949	Master Minds	Jean Yarbrough	Supervising film editor	Second collaboration with Jean Yarbrough	
1950	Blonde Dynamite	William Beaudine	Supervising film editor	Twelfth collaboration with William Beaudine	
1950	Lucky Losers	William Beaudine	Supervising film editor	Thirteenth collaboration with William Beaudine	
1950	Joe Palooka in Humphrey Takes a Chance	Jean Yarbrough	Supervising editor	Fourth collaboration with Jean Yarbrough	
1950	A Modern Marriage	Paul Landres	Editorial supervisor	Second collaboration with Paul Landres	
1950	Triple Trouble	Jean Yarbrough	Supervising film editor	Fourth collaboration with Jean Yarbrough	
1950	Bomba and the Hidden City	Ford Beebe	Supervising film editor	Fourth collaboration with Ford Beebe	

Director
Year	Film
1935	Wanderer of the Wasteland
1936	Drift Fence
1936	The Sky Parade
1936	Border Flight

Second unit or assistant director
Year	Film	Director	Role
1946	Gallant Journey	William A. Wellman	Second unit director

Writer
Year	Film	Director
1942	Lady in a Jam	Gregory La Cava

Short documentaries

Director
Year	Film	Notes
1944	Fighter Combat Formation: Attacks and Escorts	Uncredited

TV movies

Editor
Year	Film	Director	Notes
1958	Jack the Ripper	David MacDonald	Uncredited
1958	Destination Nightmare	Paul Landres	
1958	The Veil	Herbert L. Strock	

TV pilots

Editor
Year	Film	Director
1960	The Yank	Irvin Kershner
1961	Las Vegas Beat	Bernard L. Kowalski

TV series

Editor
Year	Title	Notes
1953	I'm the Law	10 episodes
1954	The Public Defender	3 episodes
1954	Lassie	1 episode
1953−54	The Abbott and Costello Show	19 episodes
1958	The Veil	7 episodes
1960	Mr. Garlund	1 episode
1959−61	The Rebel	42 episodes
1962	Bonanza	2 episodes

Editorial department
Year	Title	Role	Notes
1952−53	The Abbott and Costello Show	Supervising editor	22 episodes
1953	I'm the Law	Supervising editor	5 episodes
1954−55	The Public Defender	Supervising editor; Supervising film editor	67 episodes

== See also ==
- List of film director and editor collaborations

== Sources ==
- Otho Lovering at IMDb
- Otho Lovering > Overview - at Allmovie
