= Roy Glenn =

American character actor (1914–1971)

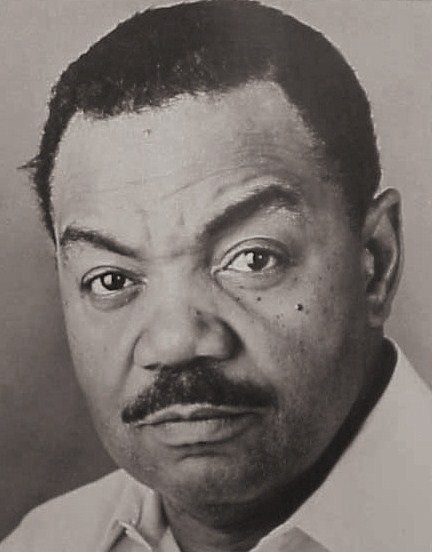
- Born: Roy Edwin Glenn; June 3, 1914; Pittsburg, Kansas, U.S.
- Died: March 12, 1971 (aged 56); Los Angeles, California, U.S.
- Other names: Roy E. Glenn, Sr.
- Occupation: Actor
- Years active: 1936–1971
- Spouse: Pauline Fractious (m. 1936)
- Children: 3

Roy Edwin Glenn, Sr. (June 3, 1914 – March 12, 1971) was an American character actor.

== Early life ==
Glenn was born in Pittsburg, Kansas on June 3, 1914.

== Career ==
Glenn's career spanned five decades, beginning in radio in the 1940s with multiple appearances on The Amos 'n' Andy Show and The Jack Benny Program, as well as appearances on other shows into the 1950s including Rocky Jordan, Suspense, Yours Truly, Johnny Dollar, and CBS Radio Workshop. He made numerous appearances from the dawn of television (including many authoritative roles on The Amos 'n' Andy Show, 1951–53) until 1970.

His first film appearance was in Kelly the Second (1936), followed by Dark Manhattan (1937). His other film credits include The Jackie Robinson Story (1950), Carmen Jones (1954), Porgy and Bess (1959), The Sound and the Fury (1959), A Raisin in the Sun (1961), with Sidney Poitier, Ruby Dee and Claudia McNeil, and a memorable turn as Mr. Prentice (the father of Poitier's character) in the 1967 film Guess Who's Coming to Dinner. Roy Glenn's last big screen appearance was in Support Your Local Gunfighter (1971).

== Personal life ==
Glenn's wife was Pauline "Lilla" (née Fractious). They had two sons and a daughter.

Glenn died from a heart attack in Los Angeles, California on March 12, 1971, at the age of 56.

== Filmography ==
- Kelly the Second (1936) as Fight Spectator (uncredited)
- Dark Manhattan (1937) as Harry Patton (uncredited)
- Uncle Tom's Bungalow (1937) as Uncle Tom (voice, uncredited)
- Slave Ship (1937) as Slave in Ship's Hold (uncredited)
- Life Begins in College (1937) as Singing Porter (uncredited)
- Song of the South (1946) as Br'er Frog (voice, uncredited)
- Half-Pint Pygmy as Pygmy (voice, uncredited)
- The Jackie Robinson Story (1950) as Mr. Gaines, Attorney (uncredited)
- Chicago Calling (1951) as Shoeshine Man (uncredited)
- Lydia Bailey (1952) as Mirabeau
- Affair in Trinidad (1952) as Fisherman (uncredited)
- The Lusty Men (1952) as Cook (uncredited)
- Bomba and the Jungle Girl (1952) as Kaje
- Jungle Drums of Africa (1953) as Naganto, Witch Doctor
- Perils of the Jungle (1953) as Korjah
- So This Is Love (1953) as Man in Negro Congregation (uncredited)
- The Royal African Rifles (1953) as Corporal John
- The Golden Idol (1954) as Gomo
- Riot in Cell Block 11 (1954) as Guard Delmar
- The Long Wait (1954) as Parking Attendant (uncredited)
- The Raid (1954) as Emmanuel, Mrs. Bishop's Butler (uncredited)
- Killer Leopard (1954) as Daniel
- Jungle Gents (1954) as Omotowa (uncredited)
- Carmen Jones (1954) as Rum Daniels
- Panther Girl of the Kongo (1955, Serial) as Danka
- A Man Called Peter (1955) as The Laborer (uncredited)
- Time Table (1956) as Train Porter (uncredited)
- The Man in the Gray Flannel Suit (1956) as Sergeant Matthews (uncredited)
- Written on the Wind (1956) as Sam
- Three Brave Men (1956) as Charley, Plant Security Guard (uncredited)
- Edge of the City (1957) as Stevedore (uncredited)
- The Green-Eyed Blonde (1957) as Mr. Budlong (uncredited)
- Alfred Hitchcock Presents (1958) (Season 4 Episode 2: "Don't Interrupt") as Bartender
- St. Louis Blues (1958) as Bull Neck (uncredited)
- Tarzan's Fight for Life (1958) as Native Chief (uncredited)
- Voice in the Mirror (1958) as Janitor at Flophouse (uncredited)
- The Sound and the Fury (1959) as Job
- Porgy and Bess (1959) as Frazier
- Take a Giant Step (1959) as Minister at Gram's Funeral (uncredited)
- The Adventures of Huckleberry Finn (1960) as Drayman (uncredited)
- A Raisin in the Sun (1961) as Willie Harris
- Sweet Bird of Youth (1962) as Charles (uncredited)
- Where Love Has Gone (1964) as Valerie's Servant (uncredited)
- A Man Called Adam (1966) as Police Detective Sergeant
- Dead Heat on a Merry-Go-Round (1966) as Sergeant Elmer K. Coxe
- The Way West (1967) as Saunders
- Guess Who's Coming to Dinner (1967) as Mr. Prentice
- Hang 'Em High (1968) as Guard #2
- I Love You, Alice B. Toklas! (1968) as Gas Station Attendant
- Finian's Rainbow (1968) as Passion Pilgrim Gospeleer (uncredited)
- ...tick...tick...tick... (1970) as The Drunk
- The Great White Hope (1970) as Pastor
- Support Your Local Gunfighter (1971) as Headwaiter (released posthumously)
- Escape from the Planet of the Apes (1971) as Lawyer (final film role; released posthumously)

== See also ==
- American Federation of Television and Radio Artists
