= Tarzan Finds a Son! =

1939 film by Richard Thorpe

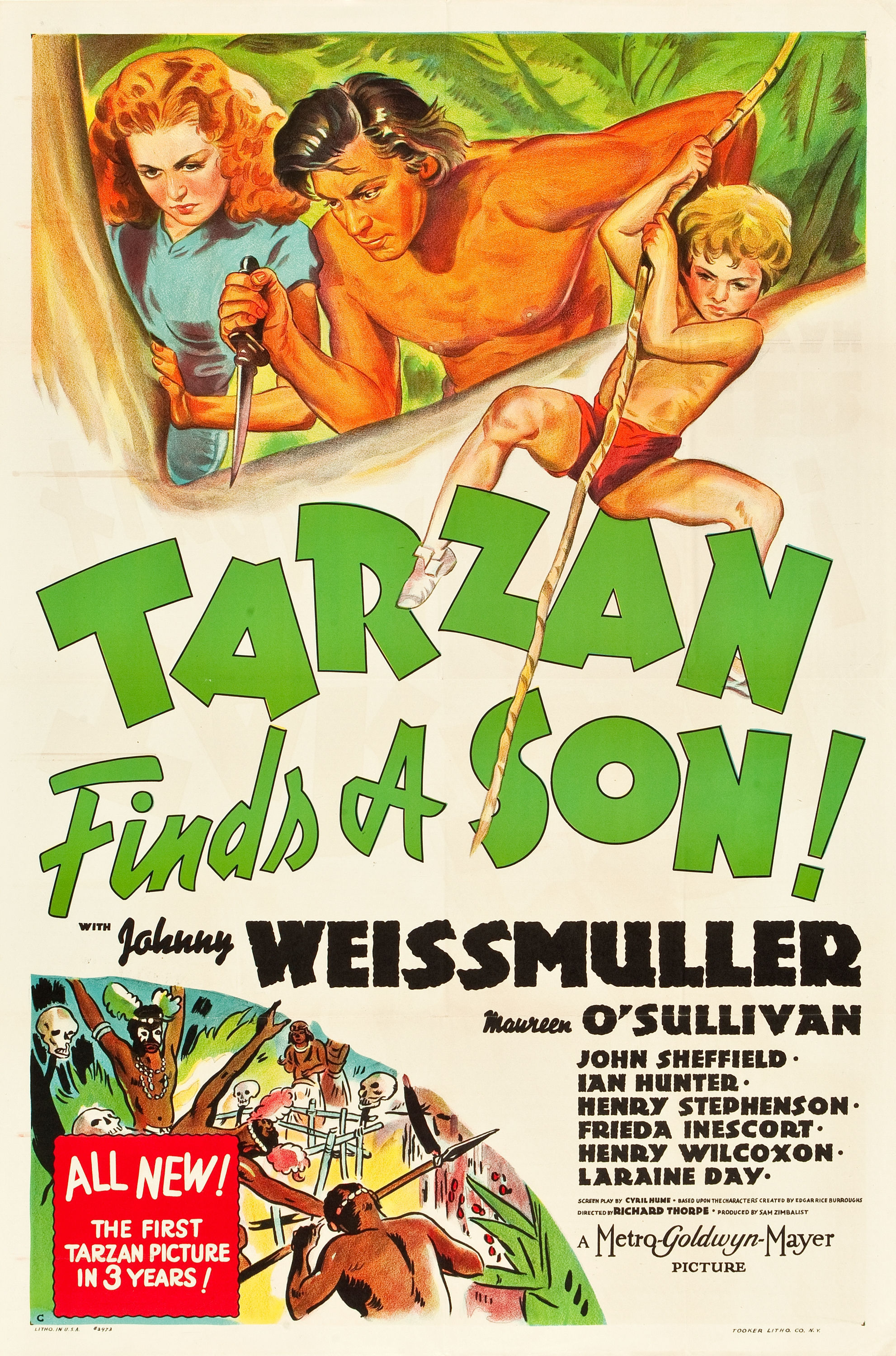
- Directed by: Richard Thorpe
- Written by: Cyril Hume
- Based on: Characters created by Edgar Rice Burroughs
- Produced by: Sam Zimbalist
- Starring: Johnny Weissmuller; Maureen O'Sullivan; Johnny Sheffield; Henry Wilcoxon
- Cinematography: Leonard Smith
- Edited by: Gene Ruggiero; Frank Sullivan
- Music by: Carl W. Stalling
- Production company: Metro-Goldwyn-Mayer
- Distributed by: Loew's Inc.
- Release date: June 16, 1939
- Running time: 82 minutes
- Country: United States
- Language: English
- Budget: $898,000
- Box office: $2,088,000

Tarzan Finds a Son! is a 1939 Tarzan film based on the character created by Edgar Rice Burroughs. It was the fourth in the MGM Tarzan series to feature Johnny Weissmuller as the "King of the Apes" and the fourth of six films in which he stars with Maureen O'Sullivan as Jane; following this pairing was Tarzan's Secret Treasure (1941) and Tarzan's New York Adventure (1942).

== Plot ==
A plane flying to Cape Town, carrying a young couple and their baby, crashes in the jungle. Everyone on the plane dies, except for the baby who is rescued by Cheeta, Tarzan's chimpanzee. Tarzan and Jane adopt the child and name him "Boy". Five years later, a search party comes looking for Boy, because he is the heir to the Greystoke family fortune worth millions. The search party is led by the Lancing family, who are distant cousins of Greystoke. Tarzan and Jane claim the child is dead and that Boy is theirs, but the elder Lancing, Sir Thomas, recognizes Boy's eyes. The younger Lancings suggest leaving Boy and taking the inheritance. When Sir Thomas objects, they say they will take him back and, as legal guardians, still control the inheritance. Sir Thomas says he'll tell Tarzan, but the rest of the party imprison Sir Thomas in a tent and plan to abduct Boy. Tarzan overhears them plotting; he steals their guns and throws them into a deep lake. Jane arrives the next day and learns what has taken place, and admits that Boy is Greystoke. She persuades Tarzan to retrieve the cache of guns, without which the search party can't survive. Tarzan retrieves them but Jane drops the rope so that Tarzan is trapped.

Jane, convinced it's the right thing to do, goes with Boy and the rest of the Lancings toward civilization, but Sir Thomas convinces her that the younger Lancings only want Boy for his money. Sir Thomas tries to sneak away, but they shoot him. Thinking Jane is trying to fool them, they ignore her directions and fall into the hands of the Zambeli, known for mutilation of captives. The white people are held in a separate hut while the tribe begins to kill and preserve the native bearers. Jane is wounded while helping Boy to escape through a fence. Boy finds Tarzan and is aided by chimps and elephants to free him. Tarzan reaches the Zambeli village and uses the elephants to drive away the natives. He saves two of the search party, and he and Jane decide to keep Boy with them in the jungle.

== Cast ==
- Johnny Weissmuller as Tarzan
- Maureen O'Sullivan as Jane Parker
- Johnny Sheffield as Boy
- Ian Hunter as Mr. Austin Lancing
- Henry Stephenson as Sir Thomas Lancing
- Frieda Inescort as Mrs. Lancing
- Henry Wilcoxon as Mr. 'Sandee' Sande
- Laraine Day as Mrs. Richard Lancing
- Morton Lowry as Mr. Richard Lancing
- Gavin Muir as Pilot

== Production background ==
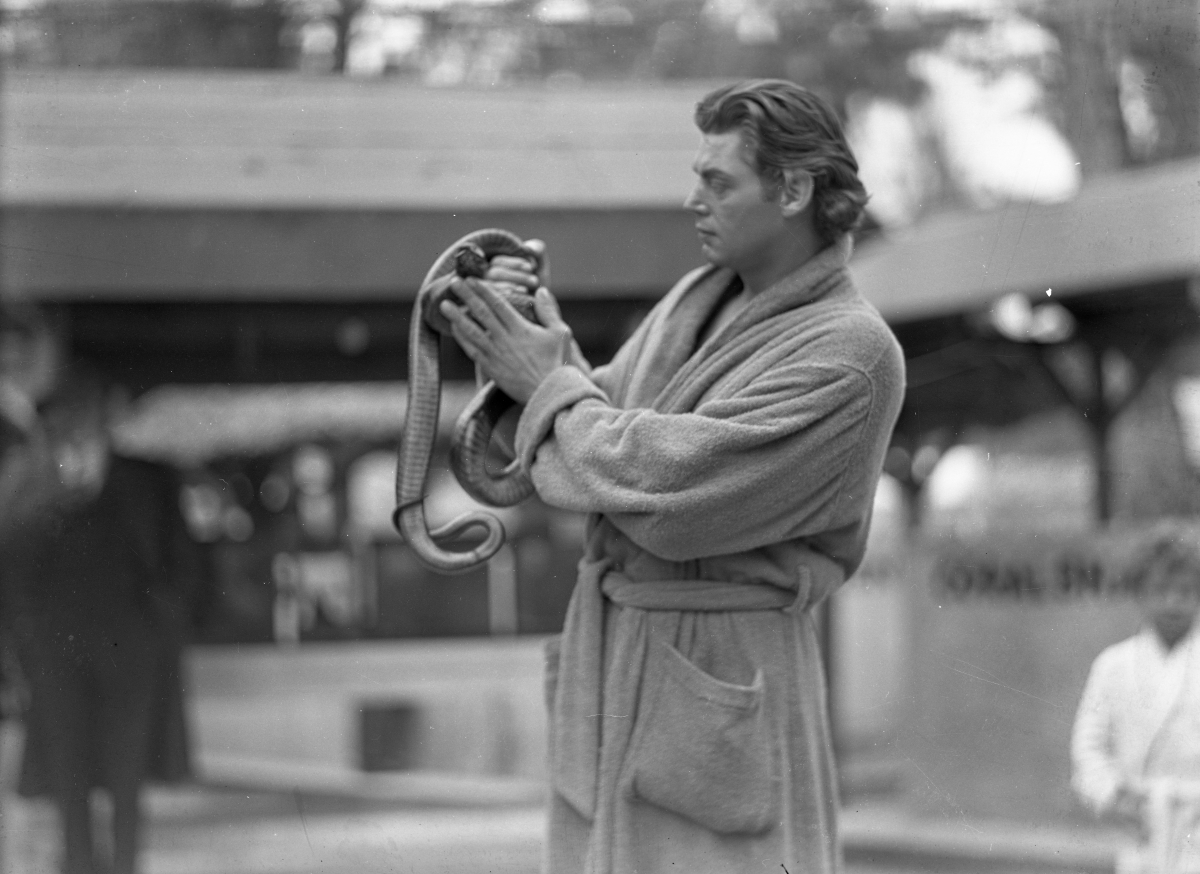
Johnny Weissmuller with a snake during filming.

The three-year gap between this and the previous Tarzan film was because MGM had originally let the film rights elapse after Tarzan Escapes. Independent producer Sol Lesser obtained the rights to make five Tarzan movies, but the first of these, Tarzan's Revenge, proved to be a flop. The producers believed that audiences were unwilling to accept Glenn Morris in the role made famous by Johnny Weissmuller. (Lesser had been unable to obtain Weissmuller's services as he remained under contract at MGM.) MGM realized that Weissmuller had continuing attraction as Tarzan and bought out Lesser's interest in the next three films; they restarted their series.

This film was originally to be called Tarzan in Exile. As it featured the jungle couple acquiring an infant, it was changed to Tarzan Finds a Son. The plot device was to appease morality groups, as Tarzan and Jane were not married in the films. This was intended as Maureen O'Sullivan's last appearance as Jane in the series, with her character to die as a result of a spear wound. O'Sullivan was tired of the Jane role, and Boy was brought in as a substitute interest. After audience previews showed very negative reactions to her death, the ending was changed. Johnny Sheffield, who played Boy, claims that Weissmuller handpicked him for the part and taught him to swim.

Since Tarzan and Jane had no son in 1936 (the date of their previous film) and since the bulk of this plot occurs five years after Boy is found, the date for this film is either 1941 or 1944. Both of these dates conflict with incidents in subsequent films that occurred during World War II. Boy in this film was the heir to the Greystoke fortune. In the original Burroughs books, Tarzan was Lord Greystoke.

Original prints of Tarzan Finds a Son! were processed in sepiatone.

== Reception ==
A contemporary review in Variety reported that "Weissmuller athletically runs and swims through as the ape-man in okay fashion," that "O’Sullivan [...] gets in some good dramatic work," and that "Sheffield does nicely and performs his athletic chores satisfactorily." Writing in Turner Classic Movies, film critic Jay S. Steinberg described the film as "a handsome-looking production" that made "extensive use of stock footage from earlier series entries." The review also notes that, "As originally conceived, Tarzan Finds a Son! was supposed to mark O'Sullivan's departure from the series, with Jane sustaining a lethal spear wound in the climactic sequence. The beautiful actress was prepped to put her career on hiatus for family; she was pregnant with her first child by director John Farrow during production [but] It didn't take many test screenings for MGM to feel the swell of fan outrage, however, and a happy ending with a recovered Jane was substituted."

According to MGM records the film earned $1,039,000 in the US and Canada and $1,049,000 elsewhere, resulting in a profit of $528,000.
