= Reginald Sheffield =

English-American actor (1901–1957)

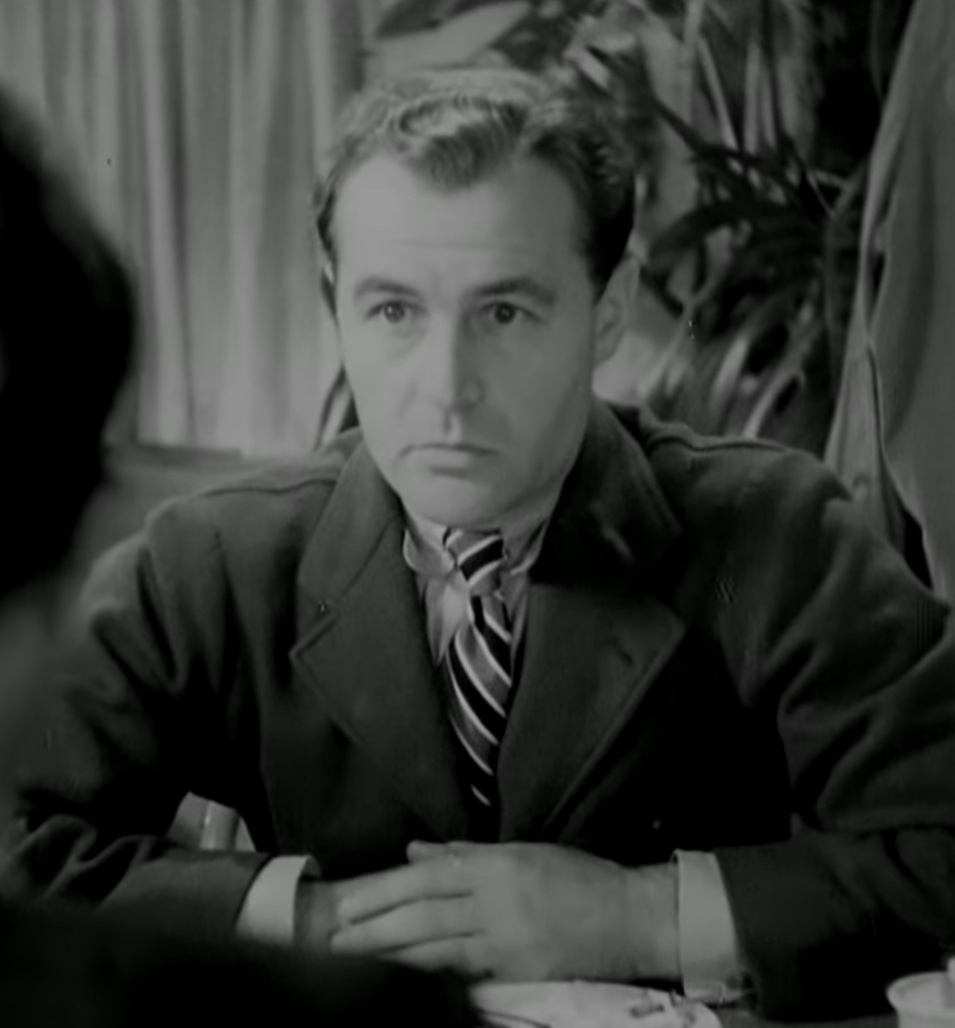
- Sheffield in Of Human Bondage (1934)
- Born: Matthew Reginald Sheffield Cassan; 18 February 1901; Hanover Square, London, England
- Died: 8 December 1957 (aged 56); Pacific Palisades, California, U.S.
- Occupation: Actor
- Years active: 1913–1957
- Spouse: Louise Van Loon (m. 1927)
- Children: 3, including Johnny Sheffield

Matthew Reginald Sheffield Cassan (18 February 1901 – 8 December 1957) was an English-American actor.

== Life ==
He was born as Matthew Reginald Sheffield Cassan on 18 February 1901 in the St. George's, Hanover Square district of London, to Matthew Sheffield Cassan and Alice Mary Field. He had a brother, Edward Sheffield Cassan and a sister, Flora Kathleen Sheffield Cassan, who became an actress known as Flora Sheffield.

His father was born in Ireland and his mother in England. They were married in London in 1892. Matthew died when Reginald was nine. In 1913 Reginald Sheffield (billed as Eric Desmond) appeared in David Copperfield. In 1914, Alice Sheffield and her children emigrated to the United States where they lived in Queens, New York. Reginald acted on the stage and in films. While his sister, Flora, was an actress, brother Edward worked as an accountant in a bank and later became a theatrical agent.

Sheffield's Broadway performances credited as Reggie Sheffield include Evidence (1914), in which his mother, Alice Sheffield, also appeared, The Merry Wives of Windsor (1916), If (1917), The Betrothal (1918) and Helena's Boys (1924). His performances credited as Reginald Sheffield include Youth (1920), The Way Things Happen (1924), Hay Fever (1925), playing Sandy Tyrell, Slaves All (1926), Soldiers and Women (1929), playing Lieutenant Mason and Dear Old England (1930).

Reginald Sheffield was married in 1927 to Louise Van Loon (21 January 1905 – 14 April 1987), a New York-born, Vassar College graduate with a liberal arts education. The couple had three children:

- Mary Alice Sheffield Cassan (born 1928)
- Jon Matthew Sheffield Cassan (11 April 1931 – 15 October 2010) (aka actor Johnny Sheffield)
- William Hart Sheffield Cassan (15 July 1935 – 12 December 2010) (actor Billy Sheffield)

As film production became more and more located in Southern California, Sheffield and his wife travelled back and forth between New York City and Los Angeles. After several years they moved permanently to the West Coast.

Sheffield was a trained stage actor, which helped him make the transition from silent films to talkies. He played numerous character and supporting roles and appeared alongside other actors such as Constance Bennett, William Powell, George Arliss, Loretta Young, Gary Cooper, Errol Flynn, Rosalind Russell, Cary Grant and Joan Fontaine.

In 1954, he began appearing as Professor Mayberry in the television series Rocky Jones, Space Ranger. And after his son, Johnny Sheffield, appeared in his last Bomba, the Jungle Boy film in 1955, Reginald created, produced and directed a pilot for a television series, Bantu, the Zebra Boy, but a sponsor was not found and the show was never produced as a weekly series.

Sheffield acted in both versions of Cecil B. DeMille's The Buccaneer in (1938) and (1958), the latter being his last screen appearance.

== Death ==
Sheffield died 8 December 1957 at his home in Pacific Palisades, California, aged 56.

== Filmography ==
- David Copperfield (1913) (Hepworth Manufacturing Company) .... David Copperfield (as a child)
- The Country Cousin (1919) (Selznick Pictures) .... Sammy Wilson
- Piccadilly Jim (1920) (Selznick Pictures) .... Ogden Pett
- Classmates (1924) (First National) .... Bert Stafford
- The Pinch Hitter (1925) (Associated Exhibitors) .... Alexis Thompson
- White Mice (1926) (Associated Exhibitors) .... Peter de Peyster
- The Nest (1927) (Excellent Pictures) .... Martin Hamilton
- The College Widow (1927) (Warner Bros.) .... Bit Role (uncredited)
- The Adorable Cheat (1928) (Chesterfield Motion Picture Corp.) .... Will Dorsey
- Sweet Sixteen (1928) (Rayart Pictures) .... Tommy Lowell
- The Green Goddess (1930) (Warner Bros.) .... Lt. Cardew
- Old English (1930) (Warner Bros.) .... Bob Phillin
- Partners of the Trail (1931) (Monogram) .... John Durant
- Lost in Limehouse (1933, Short, aka Lady Esmeralda's Predicament) (RKO) .... Dr. Jackson
- If I Were Free (1933) (RKO) .... Sharpshooter (uncredited)
- The House of Rothschild (1934) (20th Century Fox, United Artists) .... Stock Trader
- All Men Are Enemies (1934) (20th Century Fox) .... Officer (uncredited)
- Of Human Bondage (1934) (RKO) .... Cyril Dunsford
- One More River (1934, aka Over the River) (Universal Studios) .... Tommy
- Charlie Chan in London (1934) (20th Century Fox) .... Flight Cmdr. King (uncredited)
- The Lives of a Bengal Lancer (1935) (Paramount) .... Novice Clerk (uncredited)
- Cardinal Richelieu (1935) (20th Century Fox) .... Richelieu's Outrider
- Becky Sharp (1935) (RKO) .... Minor Role (uncredited)
- Black Sheep (1935) (20th Century Fox) .... One of Oscar's friends (uncredited)
- Society Fever (1935) (Chesterfield, Invincible) .... Lord Michael
- Dante's Inferno (1935) (20th Century Fox) .... Bidder (uncredited)
- Without Regret (1935) (Paramount) .... Reporter (uncredited)
- Splendor (1935) (United Artists) .... Billy Grimes
- The White Angel (1936) (Warner Bros., First National) .... Patient (uncredited)
- The Charge of the Light Brigade (1936) (Warner Bros.) .... Bentham (uncredited)
- It Happened Out West (1937, aka The Man from the Big City) (UK) (20th Century Fox) .... Middleton
- Another Dawn (1937) (Warner Bros.) .... Wireless Operator (uncredited)
- Sergeant Murphy (1938) (Warner Bros.) .... English radio commentator (uncredited)
- The Buccaneer (1938) (Paramount) .... Ship's Surgeon
- Hollywood Stadium Mystery (1938) (Republic Pictures) .... Det. Murdoch in Play (uncredited)
- Female Fugitive (1938) (Monogram) .... Dr. Richardson
- The Adventures of Robin Hood (1938) (First National, Warner Bros.) .... Herald at archery tournament (uncredited)
- Gunga Din (1939) (RKO) .... Rudyard Kipling (uncredited)
- Vigil in the Night (1940) (RKO) .... Judge Tyler (uncredited)
- My Son, My Son! (1940) (United Artists) .... Thurston - Mine Superintendent (uncredited)
- Earthbound (1940) (20th Century Fox) .... Defense Attorney
- Arise, My Love (1940) (Paramount) .... Steward (uncredited)
- Hudson's Bay (1941) (20th Century Fox) .... Clerk (uncredited)
- The Lady Eve (1941) (Paramount) .... Professor Jones (uncredited)
- Scotland Yard (1941) (20th Century Fox) .... Hat Clerk (uncredited)
- Suspicion (1941) (RKO) .... Reggie Wetherby
- Bedtime Story (1942) (Columbia) .... Broadcaster (uncredited)
- Take a Letter, Darling (1942) (Paramount) .... Husband (uncredited)
- Eagle Squadron (1942) (Universal) .... Doc (uncredited)
- Eyes in the Night (1942) (MGM) .... Victor
- Random Harvest (1942) (MGM) .... Judge (uncredited)
- The Gorilla Man (1943) (Warner Bros.) .... Announcer (voice, uncredited)
- The Crystal Ball (1943) (United Artists) .... Dad in Shooting Gallery (uncredited)
- Tonight We Raid Calais (1943) (20th Century Fox) .... English Commander
- Appointment in Berlin (1943) (Columbia) .... Miller - Wilson's Butler (uncredited)
- Bomber's Moon (1943) (20th Century Fox) .... Cantway (uncredited)
- The Man from Down Under (1943) (MGM) .... Recruit (uncredited)
- My Kingdom for a Cook (1943) (Columbia) .... Reuter's English Reporter
- Passport to Destiny (1944) (RKO) .... (uncredited)
- The Great Moment (1944) (Paramount) .... Horace Greeley (uncredited)
- Wilson (1944) (20th Century Fox) .... Secretary of War Newton D. Baker (uncredited)
- Our Hearts Were Young and Gay (1944) (Paramount) .... Purser (uncredited)
- The Man in Half Moon Street (1945) (Paramount) .... Mr. Taper (uncredited)
- Guest Wife (1945) (United Artists) .... Restaurant Manager (uncredited)
- Confidential Agent (1945) (Warner Bros.) .... Miner (uncredited)
- My Name Is Julia Ross (1945) (Columbia) .... McQuarrie (uncredited)
- Captain Kidd (1945) (United Artists) .... Captain of the King's Guard (uncredited)
- Three Strangers (1946) (Warner Bros., First National) .... Hotel Clerk (uncredited)
- To Each His Own (1946) (Paramount) .... Headwaiter (uncredited)
- Devotion (1946) (Warner Bros.) .... Charles Dickens (uncredited)
- The Searching Wind (1946) (Paramount) .... Harry, Reporter (uncredited)
- Centennial Summer (1946) (20th Century Fox) .... President Ulysses S. Grant (uncredited)
- The Verdict (1946) (Warner Bros.) .... Chaplain (uncredited)
- Temptation (1946) (Universal, International) .... Wickersham (uncredited)
- Singapore (1947) (Universal) .... Travel Agent (uncredited)
- The Exile (1947) (Universal) .... Commanding Officer (uncredited)
- If Winter Comes (1947) (MGM) .... Manager (uncredited)
- A Woman's Vengeance (1948) (Universal) .... Solicitor (uncredited)
- The Three Musketeers (1948) (MGM) .... Subaltern (uncredited)
- Kiss the Blood Off My Hands (1948) (Universal) .... Superintendent
- A Connecticut Yankee in King Arthur's Court (1949) (Paramount) .... Auctioneer (uncredited)
- Mr. Belvedere Goes to College (1949) (20th Century Fox) .... Prof. Ives (uncredited)
- Prison Warden (1949) (Columbia) .... English Charlie / Watkins
- That Forsyte Woman (1949) (MGM) .... Mr. McLean (uncredited)
- Rogues of Sherwood Forest (1950) (Columbia) .... Farmer (uncredited)
- At Sword's Point (1951) (RKO) .... Cardinal (uncredited)
- The Story of Three Loves (1953) (MGM) .... Coudray's Stage Manager (segment "The Jealous Lover") (uncredited)
- Young Bess (1953) (MGM) .... Court Recorder (uncredited)
- Second Chance (1953) (RKO) .... Mr. Woburn, English tourist
- Forbidden (1953) (Universal) .... Englishman (uncredited)
- The Black Shield of Falworth (1954) (Universal) .... Lord Constable (uncredited)
- 23 Paces to Baker Street (1956) (20th Century Fox) .... Bespectacled Man (uncredited)
- D-Day the Sixth of June (1956) (20th Century Fox) .... Hotel Proprietor (uncredited)
- Secret of Treasure Mountain (1956) (Columbia) .... Edward Lancaster
- The Story of Mankind (1957) (Warner Bros.) .... Julius Caesar
- Marjorie Morningstar (1958) (Warner Bros.) .... Hotel Desk Clerk (uncredited; posthumous release)
- The Buccaneer (1958) (Paramount) .... Tripes (posthumous release; final film role)

== TV series starring roles ==
- Rocky Jones, Space Ranger (1954) .... Professor Mayberry
- The Robot of Regalio (1956) .... Professor Mayberry
- Renegade Satellite (1956) .... Professor Mayberry ... aka The Trial of Rocky Jones (1980) (USA video title)
- The Magnetic Moon (1956) .... Professor Mayberry
- The Cold Sun (1956) .... Professor Mayberry

== TV guest starring roles ==
- Four Star Playhouse (1952) ... Gordon Richards ... episode 9: "Man on a Train" aired 15 January 1953
- Studio 57 (1954) episode 78: "The Brown Leather Case" aired 10 June 1956
- The Adventures of Jim Bowie (1956) episode: "The Bounty Hunter" aired 17 May 1957

== Bibliography ==
- John Holmstrom, The Moving Picture Boy: An International Encyclopaedia from 1895 to 1995, Norwich, Michael Russell, 1996, pp. 17–18.
