= Smoki Whitfield =

African American actor, comedian and musician (1918–1967)

- Publicity Photo of Smoki Whitfield
- Born: Robert Jordan Whitfield; August 3, 1918; Pittsburgh, Pennsylvania, USA
- Died: November 11, 1967 (aged 49); Los Angeles, California, USA
- Education: University of Oregon
- Occupation: Actor
- Spouse: Eileen Jackson
- Children: 2

Smoki Whitfield (born Robert Whitfield, and sometimes credited as Jordan Whitfield; August 3, 1918 - November 11, 1967) was an African American actor, comedian, and musician.

== Biography ==
Smoki was born in Pittsburgh to John and Effie (Walker) Whitfield. He attended the University of Oregon, where he was a star athlete and made appearances in school plays.

In the 1940s, he began a career as a character actor in Hollywood. He appeared in a third of the dozen Bomba, the Jungle Boy films. Over the next few decades, he amassed more than 50 on-screen credits. In the 1950s, he worked as a manager and MC at a number of Hawaiian nightclubs. He later worked at the Top Banana Club in North Hollywood.

In the 1959–1960 Walt Disney Studios miniseries The Swamp Fox, Whitfield played Oscar Marion, opposite Leslie Nielsen's Francis Marion. Oscar Marion was Francis Marion's man-servant, slave and friend. Whitfield sang the series' theme song, adding new verses in each of the eight installments to chronicle the characters' latest adventures. Sadly, he was given no on-screen credit for his significant role in the series.

Whitfield died in 1967 of a heart attack in North Hollywood after a lengthy illness. He was survived by his wife, Eileen Jackson, and two sons.

== Selected filmography ==
- The Virginian (1969) (TV)
- The F.B.I. (1967) (TV)
- The Donna Reed Show (1966) (TV)
- Laredo (1965–1966) (TV)
- The Farmers Daughter (1964) (TV)
- The Great Adventure (1964) (TV)
- The Magical World of Disney (1959–1961) (TV)
- Take a Giant Step (1959)
- The Last Angry Man (1959)
- M Squad (1959) (TV)
- The Rebel Set (1959)
- The Louisiana Hussy (1959)
- Kathy O' (1958)
- The Cry Baby Killer (1958)
- Guns Don't Argue (1957)
- Jet Pilot (1957)
- The Benny Goodman Story (1956)
- Jungle Jim (1955) (TV)
- One Desire (1955)
- Lord of the Jungle (1955)
- Seven Angry Men (1955)
- Killer Leopard (1954)
- The Golden Idol (1954)
- Safari Drums (1953)
- African Treasure (1952)
- Crazy Over Horses (1951)
- Callaway Went Thataway (1951)
- Journey Into Light (1951)
- The Lion Hunters (1951)
- Bomba and the Hidden City (1950)
- The Second Woman (1950)
- Bomba on Panther Island (1949)
- Bomba: The Jungle Boy (1949)
- Out of the Storm (1948)
- Jungle Goddess (1948)
- Another Part of the Forest (1948)
