= Cardinal Richelieu (film) =

1935 American historical film directed by Rowland V. Lee

- Directed by: Rowland V. Lee
- Written by: Cameron Rogers
- Based on: Richelieu; 1839 play by Edward Bulwer Lytton
- Produced by: Darryl F. Zanuck
- Starring: George Arliss; Maureen O'Sullivan; Edward Arnold
- Cinematography: J. Peverell Marley
- Edited by: Sherman Todd
- Music by: Alfred Newman
- Production company: Twentieth Century Pictures
- Distributed by: United Artists
- Release date: April 28, 1935
- Running time: 82 minutes
- Country: United States
- Language: English

Cardinal Richelieu is a 1935 American historical film directed by Rowland V. Lee and starring George Arliss, Maureen O'Sullivan, Edward Arnold and Cesar Romero. It was based on the 1839 play Richelieu by Edward Bulwer-Lytton depicting the life of the great seventeenth century French statesman Cardinal Richelieu and his dealings with Louis XIII.

== Plot ==
In the year 1630, the great feudal lords of France complain to the Pope that Cardinal Armand Richelieu, chief advisor and War Minister to King Louis XIII of France as well as a Prince of the Catholic Church, is confiscating their lands and taking away their local ruling rights, in order to make the king an absolute ruler. Back home in Paris, the weak King Louis’s wife Queen Anne and his mother, who likes his younger brother Gaston, Duke of Orleans, better, are plotting with some of the great lords to depose Louis and make Gaston King, thus preserving the nobles’ power. They try to stir Louis up against Richelieu by telling him about the magnificent palace Richelieu has built for himself, but when Richelieu gets into the King’s presence, he presents him with the deed to the palace, to take possession when (sometime in the vague future) it is finished. He is seen negotiating with King Gustavus Adolphus of Sweden, giving him money in exchange for troops to strengthen the French army, and talking to his faithful priest Father Joseph about helping the Scots in the English Civil War. He tells Joseph that his sincere motivation, which justifies his craftiness, is to make France strong and glorious.

Richelieu has a beloved ward, Lenore, daughter of a dead friend, and she and a young nobleman, Andre de Pons, have just fallen in love. King Louis comes to look at his future palace, and, to Richelieu’s chagrin, sees Lenore and lusts after her. He sends her an order to live in the royal palace, with an appointment as a lady-in-waiting to the Queen. To protect her, Richelieu arranges her marriage to Andre, who has just offered him his services; he and Lenore are separately reluctant to marry a stranger till they discover that, by happy coincidence, each is the other’s love. Richelieu marries them, and, to Louis’s anger, sends him word that Lenore cannot join his court till after her honeymoon. Louis has Andre arrested and detained.

Baradas, who is one of the nobles plotting against Louis but is pretending to be loyal to him, stirs Andre to unjustified fury against Richelieu by telling him Richelieu had him marry Lenore only as a cover so she could become the King’s mistress. He frees Andre to go and kill Richelieu, but Lenore has fled to Richelieu for protection when Andre was arrested, and when he sees her there he is undeceived and becomes Richelieu’s ally again. They pretend to the nobles who invade the Cardinal’s palace that he has strangled Richelieu, so the nobles leave thinking they are free to proceed in their plot against Louis.

The Queen Mother and the Queen leave for Spain with a document they have signed outlining their deal for the King of Spain to invade and put the Duke of Orleans on the throne in return for taking over a southern French city. The nobles play on Louis’s fears of the people of Paris to get him to order his general not to lead the French army out of Paris to stop the Spanish invasion. Richelieu, informed of all this by Andre, gets the general to avoid disobeying Louis by leaving Paris alone and waiting till Richelieu himself leads out the army for him to take charge of. Richelieu then rides to the south, catches up with the Queens and gets their incriminating document from them, thus defusing the plot. Richelieu is last seen in full churchly regalia, presiding over a joyful celebration of a strong and unified France.

== Cast ==
- George Arliss as Cardinal Richelieu
- Maureen O'Sullivan as Lenore
- Edward Arnold as Louis XIII
- Cesar Romero as Andre de Pons
- Douglass Dumbrille as Baradas
- Francis Lister as Gaston
- Halliwell Hobbes as Father Joseph
- Violet Kemble Cooper as Queen Marie
- Katharine Alexander as Anne of Austria
- Lumsden Hare as Gustavus Adolphus of Sweden
- Russell Hicks as Le Moyne
- Murray Kinnell as Duke of Lorraine
- Herbert Bunston as Duke of Normandy
- Guy Bellis as Duke of Buckingham
- Boyd Irwin as Austrian Prime Minister
- Leonard Mudie as Olivares
- Reginald Sheffield as Richelieu's Outrider
- William Worthington as King's Chamberlain
- Gilbert Emery as Noble
- John Carradine as Agitator
