= Russ Conway (actor) =

Canadian-American actor (1913–2009)

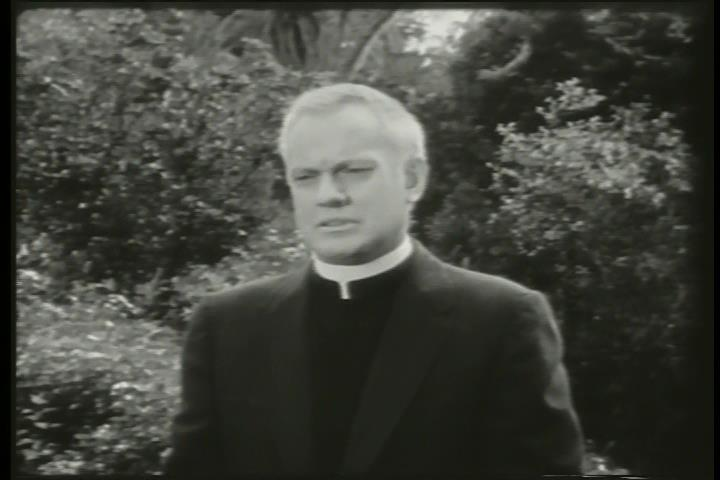
- Russ Conway in The Screaming Skull
- Born: April 25, 1913; Brandon, Manitoba, Canada
- Died: January 12, 2009 (aged 95); Laguna Hills, California, U.S.
- Occupation: Actor

Russ Conway (born Russell Zink; April 25, 1913 – January 12, 2009) was a Canadian-American actor best known for playing Fenton Hardy, the father of The Hardy Boys in the 1956–7 The Mickey Mouse Club serial.

== Early years ==
Conway graduated from UCLA in 1937, and later earned a master’s in theater arts and a teaching credential from UCLA. During World War II, Conway was in an Army special services unit. For several months, he was entertainment director at Ft. Ord before serving in the Philippines and later in Japan, where he worked as a producer and announcer for Armed Forces Radio.

== Career ==
He started acting in Hollywood in 1947. His film appearances included "Twelve O'Clock High" (1949), “The War of the Worlds” (1953), “Love Me Tender” (1956) and “What Ever Happened to Baby Jane?” (1962). His television guest spots included roles on “The Fugitive”, “The Mod Squad”, “Barnaby Jones”, “Mission: Impossible”, “Sea Hunt”, "The Lone Ranger", "Leave It to Beaver" and “The Untouchables".. In 1959 he appeared on "Wagon Train" S2 E36 "The Rodney Lawrence Story" as Mr. McCrea, the father of Rodney's love interest, who is robbed and murdered.

Conway's Broadway credits include Prologue to Glory (1938), The American Way (1939), Stop Press (1939), The Land Is Bright (1941), Johnny 2 X 4 (1942), and A Roomful of Roses (1955).

== Death ==
Conway died on January 12, 2009, in Laguna Woods, California, aged 95.

== Filmography ==
Film
Year	Title	Role	Notes
1947	Buck Privates Come Home	Medic	Uncredited
1947	The Web	Mike - Fingerprint Man	Uncredited
1947	T-Men	Code Expert	Uncredited
1947	A Double Life	Reporter	Uncredited
1948	Black Bart	Wells Fargo Agent Clayton	Uncredited
1948	The Naked City	Ambulance Doctor	Uncredited
1948	Mr. Reckless	Al - a Wise Guy	Uncredited
1948	The Winner's Circle	Jockey	Uncredited
1948	One Touch of Venus	Reporter	Uncredited
1948	Larceny	Detective	
1948	An Innocent Affair	George Haskins	Uncredited
1948	An Act of Murder	Wilson	Uncredited
1949	Flamingo Road	Johnson - Reporter	Uncredited
1949	Calamity Jane and Sam Bass	Baggage Man	Uncredited
1949	Arctic Manhunt	Landers	Uncredited
1949	I Was a Male War Bride	Cmdr. Willis - Chaplain	Uncredited
1949	Trapped	Chief Agent Gunby	
1949	The Heiress	Quintus	
1949	The Lady Takes a Sailor	Constable	Uncredited
1949	Twelve O'Clock High	Operations Officer	Uncredited
1950	Woman in Hiding	Russell - Reporter	Uncredited
1950	Backfire	Police Broadcaster	Uncredited
1950	When Willie Comes Marching Home	Maj. J.A. White	Uncredited
1950	Military Academy with That Tenth Avenue Gang	Capt. Bagby	Uncredited
1950	The Lawless	Eldredge	
1950	Three Secrets	Captain	Uncredited
1950	The Fuller Brush Girl	Police Detective	Uncredited
1950	Prisoners in Petticoats	Detective Blake	
1950	Highway 301	Detective at Phillips Shooting Scene	Uncredited
1951	Call Me Mister	Maj. T.S. McCall	Uncredited
1951	Tomahawk	Maj. Horton	
1951	Abbott and Costello Meet the Invisible Man	Newspaperman	
1951	I Was a Communist for the FBI	Frank Cvetic	Uncredited
1951	Father Takes the Air	Policeman	Uncredited
1951	Let's Go Navy!	Lt. Moss	Uncredited
1951	You Never Can Tell	Cop	Uncredited
1951	Flight to Mars	Astronomer #1	Uncredited
1952	Colorado Sundown	John T. Stocker	Uncredited
1952	Fort Osage	Mr. Whitley	Uncredited
1952	My Six Convicts	Dr. Hughes	
1952	Jet Job	Stanley Reid	
1952	My Son John	FBI Agent	(scenes deleted)
1952	Young Man with Ideas	Prosecuting Attorney	Uncredited
1952	The Outcasts of Poker Flat	Vigilante	Uncredited
1952	Jumping Jacks	Full Colonel	Uncredited
1952	Diplomatic Courier	Bill	Uncredited
1952	Fearless Fagan	Maj. Barnes	Uncredited
1952	The Rose Bowl Story	Referee Jamison	Uncredited
1952	Battle Zone	Major	Uncredited
1952	Ma and Pa Kettle on Vacation	Cmdr. Fordise - Naval Attache	Uncredited
1952	The Turning Point	Reporter	Uncredited
1952	Because of You	First FBI Man	Uncredited
1953	Girls in the Night	Sergeant	Uncredited
1953	The War of the Worlds	Rev. Bethany	Uncredited
1953	Abbott and Costello Go to Mars	Second Policeman at Bank	Uncredited
1953	One Girl's Confession	Police Officer	
1953	Safari Drums	Sgt. Collins	
1953	Vice Squad	Reporter	Uncredited
1953	Vicki	Detective	Uncredited
1953	Jennifer	Gardener	
1954	Killer Leopard	Sgt. Maitland	
1955	Top of the World	Col. Nelson	
1955	The Looters	Maj. Knowles	
1955	Tall Man Riding	Marshal Jim Feathergill	
1956	Somebody Up There Likes Me	Capt. Grifton	Uncredited
1956	Love Me Tender	Ed Galt	
1957	The Midnight Story	Det. Sgt. Sommers	
1957	Bernardine	Mr. Mason	Uncredited
1957	Portland Exposé	Phil Jackman	
1957	Escapade in Japan	Airliner Co-Pilot	Uncredited
1957	Bombers B-52	Gen. Tyler	Uncredited
1958	Flood Tide	Bill Holleran	
1958	The Screaming Skull	Rev. Edward Snow	
1958	Fort Dobbs	Sheriff of Largo	
1958	Voice in the Mirror	Owens - Tavern Owner	Uncredited
1958	Johnny Rocco	Police Lt. Fred Garron	
1960	The Bramble Bush	Sheriff Larson Witt	
1960	Twelve Hours to Kill	Police Captain Willie Long	
1960	The Great Impostor	Sgt. Wilkerson	Uncredited
1962	What Ever Happened to Baby Jane?	Police Officer #1	
1964	The Lively Set	Dave Moody	
1964	Guns of Diablo	Dr. McPheeters	
1966	Our Man Flint	American General	
1967	C'mon, Let's Live a Little	John W. Grant	
1967	The St. Valentine's Day Massacre	Interrogator	Uncredited
1968	Never a Dull Moment	Police Capt. Jacoby	Uncredited
1973	The World's Greatest Athlete	Judge with Stopwatch	
1973	Interval	Fraser	

TV
Year	Title	Role	Notes
1960	The Tom Ewell Show	Sawyer	1 episode
1961	Rawhide	Colonel Henroy	S3:E25, "Incident of the Running Man"
1963	The Alfred Hitchcock Hour	Custom Border Patrolman	1 episode
1963	The Lieutenant	COL Curtis Morley, USMC	1 episode
1967	The Fugitive	Sheriff Matt Thornton	1 episode
1968-1972	Mission: Impossible	Civilian / Dr. Walter Manning / Harry Kellem / Dr. David Walters	4 episodes
1969-1970	The Mod Squad	Dr. Jay Milton	2 episodes
