= African Treasure =

1952 film directed by Ford Beebe

- Directed by: Ford Beebe
- Written by: Ford Beebe
- Based on: Roy Rockwood (based upon characters created by)
- Produced by: Walter Mirisch
- Starring: Johnny Sheffield
- Cinematography: Harry Neumann
- Edited by: Bruce Schoengarth
- Music by: Raoul Kraushaar
- Color process: Black and white
- Production company: Monogram Pictures
- Distributed by: Monogram Pictures
- Release date: May 6, 1952 (New York City)
- Running time: 70 minutes
- Country: United States
- Language: English

African Treasure is a 1952 American adventure film directed by Ford Beebe and starring Johnny Sheffield. It is the seventh of the 12-film Bomba, the Jungle Boy series, based on the Bomba series of juvenile adventure books.

== Plot ==
Two unscrupulous geologists force the locals to work in a hidden diamond mine. Bomba, who narrowly avoids being buried alive, rescues them and defeats the villains. Bomba demonstrates communication skills as a jungle drummer.

== Cast ==
- Johnny Sheffield as Bomba
- Laurette Luez as Lita Sebastian
- Martin Garralaga as Pedro Sebastian
- Lyle Talbot as Roy DeHaven
- Leonard Mudie as Andy Barnes
- Arthur Space as Greg
- Lane Bradford as Hardy
- Smoki Whitfield as Eli
