= Guy Bellis =

British actor (1886–1980)

- Born: 24 October 1886; England; United Kingdom
- Died: 30 October 1980 (aged 94); Los Angeles, California; United States
- Years active: 1934-1953

Guy Bellis (1886–1980) was a British film actor.

== Selected filmography ==
- Cardinal Richelieu (1935)
- Storm Over Bengal (1938)
- The Little Princess (1939)
- The Private Lives of Elizabeth and Essex (1939)
- The Sea Hawk (playing Captain Hawkins) (1940)
- Dressed to Kill (1946)
- Pride of Maryland (1951)
- The Prisoner of Zenda (1952)
