= Lord of the Jungle (film) =

- Directed by: Ford Beebe
- Written by: Ford Beebe
- Based on: Based upon characters created by Roy Rockwood in the "Bomba Books"
- Produced by: Ford Beebe
- Starring: Johnny Sheffield; Wayne Morris; Paul Picerni; Nancy Hale; Bill Phipps
- Cinematography: Harry Neumann, A.S.C.
- Edited by: Lester A. Sansom (supervising film editor); Neil Brunnenkant
- Music by: Marlin Skiles
- Color process: Black and white
- Production company: Allied Artists Pictures
- Distributed by: Allied Artists Pictures Corporation
- Release date: June 12, 1955
- Running time: 69 minutes
- Country: United States
- Language: English

Lord of the Jungle is a 1955 American adventure film directed by Ford Beebe and starring Johnny Sheffield. It is the 12th and final film in the Bomba, the Jungle Boy series, which were based on the Bomba series of juvenile adventure books. It was also Sheffield's final film. He died in 2010.

== Plot ==
Bomba must locate a rogue elephant before a stubborn group of government agents slaughter the entire herd. Surprisingly, Commissioner Barnes sides with the agents but his visiting niece helps Bomba. After surviving a stampede (while tied up), Bomba identifies the guilty elephant and rescues the herd.

== Cast ==
- Johnny Sheffield as Bomba
- Wayne Morris as Jeff Wood
- Nancy Hale as Mona Andrews
- Paul Picerni as Paul Gavin
- Bill Phipps as Kenny Balou
- Leonard Mudie as Commissioner Andy Barnes
- Smoki Whitfield as Eli
- James Adamson as Elisha

Uncredited (in order of appearance)
Joel Fluellen	Molu
Juanita Moore	Molu's wife
Harry Lauter	pilot
