= Pride of Maryland =

1951 film

- Theatrical release poster
- Directed by: Philip Ford
- Screenplay by: John K. Butler
- Produced by: William T. Lackey
- Starring: Stanley Clements; Peggy Stewart; Frankie Darro; Joe Sawyer; Robert Barrat; Harry Shannon
- Cinematography: John MacBurnie
- Edited by: Harold Minter
- Music by: Stanley Wilson
- Production company: Republic Pictures
- Distributed by: Republic Pictures
- Release date: January 20, 1951
- Running time: 60 minutes
- Country: United States
- Language: English

Pride of Maryland is a 1951 American drama film directed by Philip Ford, written by John K. Butler and starring Stanley Clements, Peggy Stewart, Frankie Darro, Joe Sawyer, Robert Barrat and Harry Shannon. The film was released on January 20, 1951 by Republic Pictures.

== Plot ==
Horse trainer Frankie Longworth discovers that his former sweetheart Christine is now married to jockey Steve Loomis. Frankie seeks work as well as a chance to demonstrate his new crouching style of racing. Frankie is barred from racing after an ethical breach and Steve is killed in a fall from a horse.

After finding work with Sir Thomas Asbury, who wants to take him to England, the disgraced Frankie is able to regain his license and rides Christine's horse, Pride of Maryland, to victory.

== Cast ==
- Stanley Clements as Frankie Longworth
- Peggy Stewart as Christine Loomis
- Frankie Darro as Steve Loomis
- Joe Sawyer as Knuckles
- Robert Barrat as Colonel Harding
- Harry Shannon as Walter Shannon
- Duncan Richardson as Stevie Loomis
- Stanley Logan as Sir Thomas Asbury
- Joseph Crehan as Mr. Herndon
- Emmett Vogan as Dr. Paley
- Clyde Cook as Fred Leach
- Donald Kerr as Referee
- Guy Bellis as Lord Blanford

== See also ==
- List of films about horse racing
