= Elephant Stampede =

1951 film directed by Ford Beebe

- Original film poster
- Directed by: Ford Beebe
- Written by: Ford Beebe
- Based on: Roy Rockwood characters
- Produced by: Walter Mirisch
- Starring: Johnny Sheffield; Donna Martell; Edith Evanson
- Cinematography: William A. Sickner
- Edited by: William Austin
- Music by: Raoul Kraushaar
- Production company: Monogram Pictures
- Distributed by: Monogram Pictures
- Release date: October 21, 1951
- Running time: 71 mins
- Country: United States
- Language: English

Elephant Stampede is a 1951 American adventure film directed by Ford Beebe and starring Johnny Sheffield, Donna Martell and Edith Evanson. It was the sixth in the 12-film Bomba, the Jungle Boy series, based on the Bomba series of juvenile adventure books. The film's sets were designed by art director Vin Taylor.

== Plot ==
A schoolteacher has taught the locals to read. Her beautiful assistant is teaching Bomba when two ivory poachers arrive in the village and try to force Bomba to lead them to a hidden cache of ivory. Bomba enlists the support of his elephant friends.

== Cast ==
- Johnny Sheffield as Bomba
- Donna Martell as Lola
- John Kellogg as Bob Warren
- Edith Evanson as Miss Banks
- Martin Wilkins as Chief Nagalia
- Myron Healey as Joe Collins
- Leonard Mudie as Andy Barnes
- Guy Kingsford as Mark Phillips

== Production ==
The film was shot in Arcadia, California in the botanical garden now known as the Los Angeles County Arboretum and Botanic Garden.
