= Edith Evanson =

American actress (1896–1980)

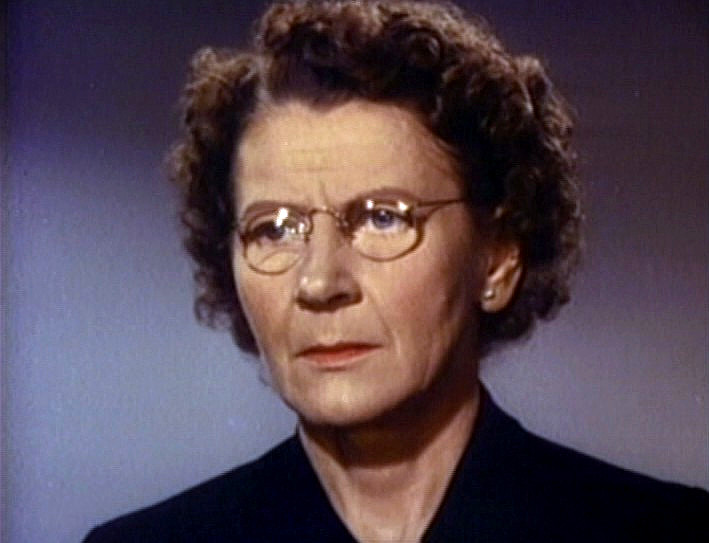
- in the trailer for Rope (1948)
- Born: Edith Carlson; April 29, 1896; Tacoma, Washington, U.S.
- Died: November 29, 1980 (aged 84); Riverside, California, U.S.
- Occupation: Actress
- Years active: 1940–1974
- Spouse: Morris Otto Evanson (m. 1923; died 1975)

Edith Evanson (née Carlson; April 29, 1896 – November 29, 1980) was an American character actress of film, stage and television during the Golden Age of Hollywood.

== Life and career ==
She was born Edith Carlson in Tacoma, Washington. Her first job was as a court reporter in Bellingham.

On March 15, 1923, she married Morris Otto Evanson (1893–1975). The couple had no children.

Her first film role came in The Man Who Wouldn't Talk (1940) in an uncredited role. In the 1940s she was in supporting roles mostly as a maid, a busybody, landladies, or middle-aged secretaries. Some of her other film roles include parts in Citizen Kane (1941), Blossoms in the Dust (1941), Woman of the Year (1942), Reunion in France (1942), The Strange Woman (1947), I Remember Mama (1948), Rope (1948), The Damned Don't Cry (1950), The Day the Earth Stood Still (1951) and Disney's Toby Tyler (1960). During her time in Hollywood, she co-starred opposite some of its greatest legends, including Greer Garson, Walter Pidgeon, Orson Welles, Joan Crawford, Michael Rennie, Glenn Ford, Patricia Neal, James Stewart, Irene Dunne, Spencer Tracy, Katharine Hepburn, and Hedy Lamarr.

With the coming of television in the late 1940s she expanded in her career appearing on such shows as You Are There, The Loretta Young Show, Chevron Hall of Stars, Jane Wyman Presents The Fireside Theatre, The Millionaire, Zane Grey Theater, Alfred Hitchcock Presents, The Frank Sinatra Show, Bachelor Father, Alcoa Presents: One Step Beyond, and Lassie.

A stage actress as well as film star, Evanson often appeared in productions which were staged in the Los Angeles area. She played a Swedish mother reminiscing about the births, deaths, and lives of her children in DeWitt Bodeen's play, Harvest of Years in 1946 (Evanson's performance was called "poignant" by the Los Angeles Times). Although Evanson had played one of the aunts in the 1948 film I Remember Mama, she portrayed Mama herself on stage just a year later.

Director George Cukor, a friend of Evanson, asked her to coach Marilyn Monroe on a Swedish accent for Monroe's role in the unfinished film Something's Got to Give (from which Monroe was eventually fired). Evanson spent several months with Monroe, and spoke to her just days before the troubled actress's death.

In the late 1960s and early 1970s Evanson found herself getting little work in Hollywood due to her advancing age; though she was credited with an appearance on Gunsmoke in 1964, playing a senile housekeeper in the episode "Father’s Love" (S9E24) and in 1974 she made her last appearance in an episode of Apple's Way.

Following her retirement, Evanson lived in Riverside, California until her death from heart failure on November 29, 1980. Her ashes were scattered into the Pacific Ocean.

== Selected filmography ==
- The Man Who Wouldn't Talk (1940) - Hannah (uncredited)
- Life with Henry (1940) - Anne, Swedish Maid (uncredited)
- Citizen Kane (1941) - Leland's Nurse (uncredited)
- Blossoms in the Dust (1941) - Hilda, Mrs. Kahly's Maid (uncredited)
- Woman of the Year (1942) - Alma
- Girl Trouble (1942) - Huida
- Dr. Gillespie's New Assistant (1942) - Hilda (uncredited)
- Reunion in France (1942) - Genevieve
- Chetniks! The Fighting Guerrillas (1943) - Mother (uncredited)
- The Moon Is Down (1943) - Ludwig's Wife (uncredited)
- Bomber's Moon (1943) - Elsa (uncredited)
- There's Something About a Soldier (1943) - Mrs. Emma Edwards (uncredited)
- Swing Out the Blues (1943) - Mrs. T.W. (uncredited)
- Four Jills in a Jeep (1944) - French Maid (scenes deleted)
- The Soul of a Monster (1944) - Mrs. Jameson, Housekeeper (uncredited)
- And Now Tomorrow (1944) - Mrs. Vankovitch (uncredited)
- Youth on Trial (1945) - Mother (uncredited)
- The Jade Mask (1945) - Louise Harper
- Captain Eddie (1945) - Nurse (uncredited)
- The Fighting Guardsman (1946) - Mame. Paquin (uncredited)
- The Scarlet Horseman (1946) - Lu (uncredited)
- The Notorious Lone Wolf (1946) - Olga - Carla's Maid
- Mysterious Intruder (1946) - Mrs. Ward (uncredited)
- Don't Gamble with Strangers (1946) - Mrs. Fielding, Swedish Maid
- The Bachelor's Daughters (1946) - Secretary (uncredited)
- The Strange Woman (1946) - Mrs. Coggins (uncredited)
- Fun on a Weekend (1947) - Mr. Cowperwaithe's Secretary (uncredited)
- The Corpse Came C.O.D. (1947) - Rose's Assistant (uncredited)
- Singapore (1947) - Mrs. Edith Barnes
- Forever Amber (1947) - Sarah (uncredited)
- I Remember Mama (1948) - Aunt Sigrid
- Rope (1948) - Mrs. Wilson
- The Gallant Blade (1948) - Bit (uncredited)
- You Gotta Stay Happy (1948) - Mrs. Racknell
- Big Jack (1949) - Widow Simpson (uncredited)
- Madame Bovary (1949) - Mother Superior (uncredited)
- Perfect Strangers (1950) - Mary Travers
- The Damned Don't Cry (1950) - Mrs. Castleman
- Caged (1950) - Miss Barker (uncredited)
- Union Station (1950) - Mrs. Willecombe (uncredited)
- The Magnificent Yankee (1950) - Annie Gough
- The Company She Keeps (1951) - Mrs. Holman (uncredited)
- The Redhead and the Cowboy (1951) - Mrs. Barrett
- Rawhide (1951) - Mrs. Hickman (uncredited)
- Ace in the Hole (1951) - Miss Deverich (uncredited)
- The Day the Earth Stood Still (1951) - Mrs. Crockett (uncredited)
- Elephant Stampede (1951) - Miss Banks
- Hans Christian Andersen (1952) - Mrs. Berta (uncredited)
- Down Among the Sheltering Palms (1953) - Mrs. Edgett (uncredited)
- It Happens Every Thursday (1953) - Mrs. Peterson
- Shane (1953) - Mrs. Shipstead
- The Stranger Wore a Gun (1953) - Mrs. Martin (uncredited)
- The Big Heat (1953) - Selma Parker
- About Mrs. Leslie (1954) - Mrs. Fine
- Désirée (1954) - Queen Hedwig (uncredited)
- The Road to Denver (1955) - Mrs. Garrett (uncredited)
- The Silver Star (1955) - Belle Dowdy
- City of Shadows (1955) - Mrs. Fellows (uncredited)
- The Girl in the Red Velvet Swing (1955) - Josie (uncredited)
- The Leather Saint (1956) - Stella
- Storm Center (1956) - Mrs. Simmons (uncredited)
- Alfred Hitchcock Presents (1957) (Season 2 Episode 18: "The Manacled") - Lady with Suitcase / Fontaine's Mother
- The Quiet Gun (1957) - Mrs. Merrick
- Drango (1957) - Mrs. Blackford
- The Young Stranger (1957) - Lotte, the Dittmar Cook (uncredited)
- Alfred Hitchcock Presents (1958) (Season 3 Episode 32: "Listen, Listen...!") - Mrs. Johnson
- The Restless Gun (1958) - Aunt Minnie in Episode "A Pressing Engagement"
- The Restless Gun (1959) - Episode "The Sweet Sisters"
- Journey to the Center of the Earth (1959) - Innkeeper (uncredited)
- Toby Tyler (1960) - Aunt Olive
- Swingin' Along (1961) - Woman (uncredited)
- The Clown and the Kid (1961) - Mother Superior
- Twice-Told Tales (1963) - Lisabetta, the landlady
- The Prize (1963) - Mrs. Ahlquist (uncredited)
- Marnie (1964) - Rita, Cleaning Woman
- Penelope (1966) - Newsstand Proprietor (uncredited)
- The Split (1968) - Woman in Police Station (uncredited)
- The Seven Minutes (1971) - Cassie
