= Tarzan's Secret Treasure =

1941 Tarzan film directed by Richard Thorpe

- theatrical poster
- Directed by: Richard Thorpe
- Screenplay by: Myles Connolly; Paul Gangelin
- Based on: Characters created by Edgar Rice Burroughs
- Produced by: B.P. Fineman
- Starring: Johnny Weissmuller; Maureen O'Sullivan; Johnny Sheffield; Barry Fitzgerald
- Cinematography: Clyde De Vinna
- Edited by: Gene Ruggiero
- Music by: David Snell
- Production company: Metro-Goldwyn-Mayer
- Distributed by: Loew's Inc.
- Release date: December 1, 1941
- Running time: 81 minutes
- Country: United States
- Languages: English; Unidentified African language

Tarzan's Secret Treasure is a 1941 American adventure film directed by Richard Thorpe and starring Johnny Weissmuller, Maureen O'Sullivan and Johnny Sheffield. Based on the Tarzan character created by Edgar Rice Burroughs, it is the fifth in the MGM Tarzan series to feature Weissmuller and O'Sullivan. Original prints of the film were processed in sepiatone.

The next film in the series would be Tarzan's New York Adventure (1942), the last in the series to feature Maureen O'Sullivan, and the last before the series moved to RKO.

== Plot ==
An expedition team arrives on Tarzan's escarpment. By chance, the two villainous members Medford and Vandermeer find out that there is plenty of gold on the escarpment. They kidnap Jane and Boy in order to make Tarzan show them the location of the gold. After Tarzan complies, Medford shoots him and mistakenly presumes he is dead. Soon the group is captured by natives, whereupon Tarzan comes to their rescue.

== Cast ==
- Johnny Weissmuller as Tarzan
- Maureen O'Sullivan as Jane Parker
- Johnny Sheffield as Boy (as John Sheffield)
- Reginald Owen as Professor Elliott
- Barry Fitzgerald as O'Doul
- Tom Conway as Medford
- Philip Dorn as Vandermeer
- Cordell Hickman as Tumbo
- Johnny Eck as Bird (uncredited)
- Everett Brown as Native (uncredited)

== Critical response ==
Film critic Bosley Crowther wrote in The New York Times that the film has "nothing about it which would distinguish it from other Tarzan films," that "the fanciful concept of the whole thing is, as usual, pleasantly lacking in guile," and "it concludes in the customary fashion with Tarzan conscripting his faithful friends, the beasts, to put the outsiders in their places and to save his African solitude." A review of the film in Variety reported that it "swings into straight meller for the second half," that "direction by Richard Thorpe injects a good pace to the script," and "Weissmuller adequately handles the Tarzan role in his usual style [...] O’Sullivan carries quite an English accent into the jungle, which is apparent throughout." The film was described on Turner Classic Movies as "fast-moving," that "O'Sullivan is charming in her brief scenes, particularly in the opening sequence when she uses 'Jungle Modern' conveniences to prepare dinner," that it "sports an impressive array of reliable character actors," and that it "boasts some well-executed effects shots [and] its fair share of stock footage."

== Bibliography ==
- Fetrow, Alan G. Feature Films, 1940-1949: a United States Filmography. McFarland, 1994.
