= Leonard Mudie =

English actor (1883–1965)

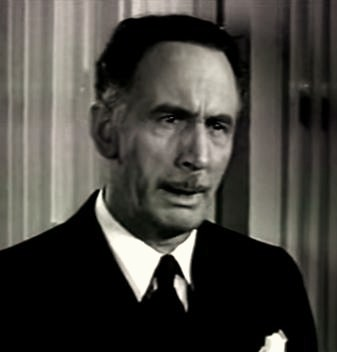
- Mudie in British Intelligence (1940)
- Born: Leonard Mudie Cheetham; 11 April 1883; Cheetham Hill, Manchester, Lancashire, England
- Died: 14 April 1965 (aged 82); Los Angeles, California, U.S.
- Resting place: Chapel of the Pines Crematory
- Occupation: Actor
- Years active: 1908–1965
- Spouse(s): Beatrice Terry; Gladys Lennox

Leonard Mudie (born Leonard Mudie Cheetham; 11 April 1883 – 14 April 1965) was an English character actor whose career lasted for nearly fifty years. After a successful start as a stage actor in England, he appeared regularly in the US, and made his home there from 1932. He appeared in character roles on Broadway and in Hollywood films.

== Life and career ==
=== Early years ===
Leonard Mudie Cheetham was born in Cheetham Hill, a suburb of Manchester, England, the son of Thomas Hurst Cheetham and Lucy Amy Mudie. He made his stage debut with Annie Horniman's company at the Gaiety Theatre, Manchester in 1908. He remained with the company for several seasons, in a wide range of roles including Humphrey in The Knight of the Burning Pestle, Verges in Much Ado About Nothing, Alan Jeffcoate in the première of Hindle Wakes, Joseph Surface in The School for Scandal, Gordon Jayne in The Second Mrs. Tanqueray and Walter How in Justice.

In The Manchester Guardian, James Agate commented on Mudie's acting in 1909, "[He] has a definite and genuine feeling for the stage. His enunciation is very faulty, his accent not good … but the acting instinct is there." With the Horniman company Mudie made his London and American debuts.

In 1914 and 1915 Mudie appeared at the Opera House, Boston in The Merry Wives of Windsor, Julius Caesar, The Merchant of Venice, and Twelfth Night. In 1916 he appeared at the New Amsterdam Theatre, New York in The Merry Wives of Windsor, playing Justice Shallow to the Falstaff of Sir Herbert Tree. For the next five years he appeared on Broadway and on tour in the US in modern plays, including a run playing Abraham Lincoln in a play based on the politician's life (1921), and another playing Brian Strange in A.A. Milne's Mr Pim Passes By (1922).

=== Film career ===
Mudie as the priest in Rage in Heaven (1941)

Mudie made his film debut in a Boris Karloff film, The Mummy in 1932. He moved to Hollywood in that year, and lived there for the rest of his life. He played a range of screen parts, some substantial, and others short cameos. Among the bigger roles were Dr Pearson in The Mummy, Porthinos in Cleopatra (1934), Maitland in Mary of Scotland (1936), and De Bourenne in Anthony Adverse (1936). His small roles, according to The New York Times, were typically "a bewigged, gimlet-eyed British judge".

Mudie made the postwar transition into television, and appeared in four episodes of Adventures of Superman, in roles ranging from the comedic to the sinister. For the postwar cinema he played the regular character Commander Barnes in the series of Bomba, the Jungle Boy films. Mudie's final acting role was as one of the elderly survivors of a wrecked spaceship in “The Cage”, the first pilot episode of Star Trek, which was filmed in 1964 but not broadcast on television in full until 1988.

== Partial filmography ==
- A Message from Mars (1921) – Fred Jones
- Through the Storm (1922) – Jeremiah
- The Mummy (1932) – Professor Pearson
- Voltaire (1933) – Morteau (uncredited)
- Dark Hazard (1934) – Birdy—Australian Tout (uncredited)
- Mandalay (1934) – Police Lieutenant (uncredited)
- The Mystery of Mr. X (1934) – Mr. X
- The House of Rothschild (1934) – Tax Collector in Prussia
- Viva Villa! (1934) – Statesman (uncredited)
- Cleopatra (1934) – Pothinos
- The Painted Veil (1934) – Barrett, Townsend's Secretary (uncredited)
- The Little Minister (1934) – Villager (uncredited)
- Clive of India (1935) – General Burgoyne
- Les Misérables (1935) – Priest Counselling Released Prisoners (uncredited)
- Cardinal Richelieu (1935) – Olivares
- Becky Sharp (1935) – Tarquin
- Top Hat (1935) – Flower Salesman (uncredited)
- Rendezvous (1935) – Roberts
- A Feather in Her Hat (1935) – Hyde Park Orator (uncredited)
- The Great Impersonation (1935) – Mangan
- Captain Blood (1935) – Baron Jeffreys
- Sylvia Scarlett (1935) – Train Steward (uncredited)
- Professional Soldier (1935) – Radical (uncredited)
- Magnificent Obsession (1935) – Dr. Bardendreght (uncredited)
- The Story of Louis Pasteur (1936) – Coachman (uncredited)
- Mary of Scotland (1936) – Maitland
- Anthony Adverse (1936) – De Bourrienne
- His Brother's Wife (1936) – Pete
- Lloyd's of London (1936) – Waiter
- Stolen Holiday (1937) – Wedding Guest (uncredited)
- Lost Horizon (1937) – Foreign Secretary with Prime Minister (uncredited)
- The King and the Chorus Girl (1937) – Footman
- Thin Ice (1937) – Chauffeur (scenes deleted)
- Shall We Dance (1937) – Room Service Waiter (uncredited)
- The League of Frightened Men (1937) – Professor Hibbard
- Parnell (1937) – Conservative Member (uncredited)
- Another Dawn (1937) – Army Doctor (uncredited)
- They Won't Forget (1937) – Judge Moore
- London by Night (1937) – Squires
- Madame X (1937) – Prosecutor Valmorin (uncredited)
- Lancer Spy (1937) – Statesman
- A Damsel in Distress (1937) – Bit Role (uncredited)
- You're a Sweetheart (1937) – Critic (uncredited)
- The Jury's Secret (1938) – District Attorney
- The Adventures of Robin Hood (1938) – the town crier and as an eye-patched man stealthily telling men to meet Robin at the Gallows Oak (uncredited)
- Kidnapped (1938) – Red Fox
- The Rage of Paris (1938) – Uncle Eric (uncredited)
- When Were You Born (1938) – Frederick 'Fred' Gow (Scorpio)
- Marie Antoinette (1938) – Man Yelling 'Have You Proof?' (uncredited)
- Letter of Introduction (1938) – Critic (uncredited)
- Mysterious Mr. Moto (1938) – Monk (uncredited)
- The Mad Miss Manton (1938) – Managing Editor (uncredited)
- Suez (1938) – Campaign Manager
- Arrest Bulldog Drummond (1938) – Richard Gannett
- Dramatic School (1938) – Bishop Cauchon in "Joan of Arc" (uncredited)
- Devil's Island (1939) – Advocate General
- Nancy Drew... Reporter (1939) – Deputy District Attorney (uncredited)
- The Story of Vernon and Irene Castle (1939) – British Officer (uncredited)
- Dark Victory (1939) – Dr. Driscoll
- Chasing Danger (1939) – Fort Chadran Lieutenant (uncredited)
- Man About Town (1939) – Gibson, Arlington's Secretary (uncredited)
- The Adventures of Sherlock Holmes (1939) – Barrows – Moriarty's Attorney (uncredited)
- Tropic Fury (1939) – J.T.M. Gallon
- Rulers of the Sea (1939) – Mr. Barton (uncredited)
- The Earl of Chicago (1940) – Mr. Allington (uncredited)
- Congo Maisie (1940) – Farley
- British Intelligence (1940) – James Yeats
- Charlie Chan's Murder Cruise (1940) – Gerald Pendleton
- Waterloo Bridge (1940) – Thomas Parker (uncredited)
- Brother Orchid (1940) – English Diamond Salesman (uncredited)
- The Sea Hawk (1940) – Castle Sentry (uncredited)
- Foreign Correspondent (1940) – McKenna
- He Stayed for Breakfast (1940) – Communist Secretary (uncredited)
- A Dispatch from Reuters (1940) – Member of Parliament (uncredited)
- The Letter (1940) – Fred (uncredited)
- South of Suez (1940) – Registrar
- You'll Find Out (1940) – Real Karl Fenninger (uncredited)
- Rage in Heaven (1941) – Prison Priest (uncredited)
- Scotland Yard (1941) – Clerk (uncredited)
- The People vs. Dr. Kildare (1941) – Dr. Sterling (uncredited)
- Singapore Woman (1941) – The Doctor (uncredited)
- The Nurse's Secret (1941) – Hugo
- Shining Victory (1941) – Mr. Foster
- Skylark (1941) – Jewelry Clerk
- Berlin Correspondent (1942) – George, English Prisoner
- Random Harvest (1942) – Old Man Witnessing Accident (uncredited)
- Appointment in Berlin (1943) – MacPhail (uncredited)
- Dragon Seed (1944) – Old Peddler Selling Poison (uncredited)
- Winged Victory (1944) – Minor Role (uncredited)
- The Corn Is Green (1945) – Station Master (uncredited)
- The Scarlet Clue (1945) – Horace Karlos (uncredited)
- Divorce (1945) – Harvey Hicks
- My Name Is Julia Ross (1945) – Peters (uncredited)
- Don't Gamble with Strangers (1946) – Robert Elliot
- The Locket (1946) – Hickson, Air Raid Warden (uncredited)
- The Private Affairs of Bel Ami (1947) – Potin
- Bulldog Drummond at Bay (1947) – Meredith
- Escape Me Never (1947) – Doctor in London (uncredited)
- Song of My Heart (1948) – Conductor
- The Checkered Coat (1948) – Jerry
- A Connecticut Yankee in King Arthur's Court (1949) – Mayor's Aide (uncredited)
- Challenge to Lassie (1949) – Constable with Net (uncredited)
- The Sword of Monte Cristo (1951) – Court Physician
- Royal Wedding (1951) – Singing Doorman (uncredited)
- Lorna Doone (1951) – Calvin Oates Sr. (uncredited)
- When Worlds Collide (1951) – British U.N. Representative (uncredited)
- Elephant Stampede (1951) – Andy Barnes
- The Son of Dr. Jekyll (1951) – Pharmacist (uncredited)
- African Treasure (1952) – Andy Barnes
- Limelight (1952) – Calvero's Doctor
- Bomba and the Jungle Girl (1952) – Commissioner Andy Barnes
- Abbott and Costello Meet Captain Kidd (1952) – Captain Bonney's First Mate (uncredited)
- The Magnetic Monster (1953) – Howard Denker
- Perils of the Jungle (1953) – Grubbs
- Safari Drums (1953) – Deputy Commissioner Andy Barnes
- The Golden Idol (1954) – Commissioner Andy Barnes
- King Richard and the Crusaders (1954) – Physician (uncredited)
- Killer Leopard (1954) – Deputy Commissioner Andy Barnes
- The Black Shield of Falworth (1954) – Friar Edward
- Bengal Brigade (1954) – Pariah (uncredited)
- The Silver Chalice (1954) – Stall Keeper (uncredited)
- Kiss Me Deadly (1955) – Athletic Club Clerk (uncredited)
- Lord of the Jungle (1955) – Commissioner Andy Barnes
- The Girl in the Red Velvet Swing (1955) – Man in Audience (uncredited)
- Kismet (1955) – Physician (uncredited)
- Diane (1956) – Porter (uncredited)
- Autumn Leaves (1956) – Colonel Hillyer
- The Story of Mankind (1957) – Chief Inquisitor
- Alfred Hitchcock Presents (1959) (Season 4 Episode 24: "The Avon Emeralds") as Assayer (uncredited)
- The Big Fisherman (1959) – Ilderan
- Timbuktu (1959) – Mohomet Adani (uncredited)
- How to Murder Your Wife (1965) – Club Secretary (uncredited)
- The Greatest Story Ever Told (1965) – Man (uncredited)

== Death ==
Mudie died on 14 April 1965, three days after his 82nd birthday, in Los Angeles, California.
