= Bomba, the Jungle Boy =

Juvenile book series

- Johnny Sheffield and Peggy Ann Garner in Monogram Pictures 1949 film
- Author: Roy Rockwood
- Language: English
- Publisher: Stratemeyer Syndicate
- Publication date: 1926–1938
- Publication place: North America
- Media type: Print (hardback & paperback)
- Pages: 210

Bomba, the Jungle Boy is a series of American boys' adventure books produced by the Stratemeyer Syndicate under the pseudonym Roy Rockwood and published by Cupples & Leon in the first half of the 20th century, in imitation of the successful Tarzan series.

== History ==
Twenty books are in the series. The first 10 (published from 1926–1930) are set in South America, where Bomba, a white boy who grew up in the jungle, tries to discover his origin. The second set of 10 books (published from 1931–1938) shift the scene to Africa, where a slightly older Bomba has jungle adventures. The first editions all used the same cover illustration on their dust jackets; only the title would differ from book to book.

A common theme of the Bomba books is stated in the first volume of the series, when Bomba concludes that: "The native's souls were asleep. The white men's souls were awake. And he was white!" Richard A. Lupoff, in his book Master of Adventure, a study of the works of Tarzan creator Edgar Rice Burroughs, describes the Bomba tales as more blatantly racist than the often-criticized Tarzan books.

From 1949 through 1955, Monogram Pictures brought the character to the motion-picture screen in 12 Bomba films, starring Johnny Sheffield, who was already established as an outdoor star; he had portrayed the character Boy in the Tarzan films with Johnny Weissmuller. The Bomba films were all set in Africa.

When the Bomba films proved popular with young audiences, the first ten Bomba books were reprinted in the 1950s with all-new cover illustrations by Grosset & Dunlap, a publisher of many popular series books such as The Hardy Boys and Nancy Drew. These same books were reprinted again later by Clover Books, a short-lived publisher that also reprinted the Grosset and Dunlap series Tom Quest. Although the Clover editions had no dustjackets, they retained the Grosset & Dunlap cover art.

In 1962, WGN-TV repackaged the Bomba films as a primetime summertime series called Zim Bomba that became a local ratings sensation. WGN executive Fred Silverman stated that "Zim" meant "Son of" in Swahili.

In 1967–1968, DC Comics published a Bomba comic book series. It ran for seven issues and included scripts by Denny O'Neil and artwork by Jack Sparling. Stories from this series later were reprinted in DC's Tarzan title, but the character was re-named Simba, as DC no longer held the license.

== Novels ==
All of the first editions had the same picture on the dust jacket; only the title was different. The Grosset and Dunlap books had different cover art on the dust jacket of each title. The Clover editions had no dustjackets, but had picture covers reprinting the Grosset and Dunlap art.

1. Bomba, the Jungle Boy, 1926 (First ten novels were set in South America)
2. Bomba, the Jungle Boy at the Moving Mountain, 1926
3. Bomba, the Jungle Boy at the Giant Cataract, 1926
4. Bomba, the Jungle Boy on Jaguar Island, 1927
5. Bomba, the Jungle Boy and the Abandoned City, 1927
6. Bomba, the Jungle Boy on Terror Trail, 1928
7. Bomba, the Jungle Boy in the Swamp of Death, 1929
8. Bomba, the Jungle Boy Among the Slaves, 1929
9. Bomba, the Jungle Boy on the Underground River, 1930
10. Bomba, the Jungle Boy and the Lost Explorers, 1930
11. Bomba, the Jungle Boy in a Strange Land, 1931 (Bomba's first adventure in Africa)
12. Bomba, the Jungle Boy Among the Pygmies, 1931
13. Bomba, the Jungle Boy and the Cannibals, 1932
14. Bomba, the Jungle Boy and the Painted Hunters, 1932
15. Bomba, the Jungle Boy and the River Demons, 1933
16. Bomba, the Jungle Boy and the Hostile Chieftain, 1934
17. Bomba, the Jungle Boy Trapped by the Cyclone, 1935
18. Bomba, the Jungle Boy in the Land of Burning Lava, 1936
19. Bomba, the Jungle Boy in the Perilous Kingdom, 1937
20. Bomba, the Jungle Boy in the Steaming Grotto, 1938

== Films ==
=== Production ===
Walter Mirisch had been general manager of Monogram Pictures since 1945. They specialized in low-budget films, including series of regular characters such as Charlie Chan, Joe Palooka, and the Bowery Boys. Mirisch looked at the success of the Tarzan films and remembered the Bomba novels; he thought they might translate well into films.

In November 1947, Monogram announced it had bought the rights to all 20 of the novels. The studio assigned Walter Mirisch to oversee their production, with the intention of making three Bomba films per year, in color. They were seeking a male actor aged 18 to 20 to star.

In September 1948, Monogram's president, Steve Broidy, announced that the studio would make two Bomba films over the following year, and the films would be in black and white. The decision to film in black-and-white was based on economics and efficiency: the studio could insert authentic, black-and-white jungle footage into the new productions. Veteran action director Ford Beebe directed all of the films and scripted most of them. Only two actors appeared regularly as Bomba's companions: Leonard Mudie as deputy commissioner Andy Barnes, and Smoki Whitfield as friendly native Eli. African-American actor James Adamson made occasional appearances in various roles.

Mirisch later claimed he was paid $2,500 per film, and the success of the series launched him as a producer; he later became a senior executive at Monogram's successor, Allied Artists Pictures Corporation.

Johnny Sheffield retired at age 24 after completing the twelfth Bomba film, Lord of the Jungle.

=== List of films ===
(Note: Johnny Sheffield plays Bomba in all 12 films)

1. Bomba, the Jungle Boy (1949) with Peggy Ann Garner and Onslow Stevens
2. Bomba on Panther Island (1949) with Allene Roberts
3. The Lost Volcano (1950) with Elena Verdugo
4. Bomba and the Hidden City (1950) with Sue England
5. The Lion Hunters (1951) with Morris Ankrum and Ann Todd
6. Elephant Stampede (1952) with Donna Martell and Myron Healey
7. African Treasure (1952) with Lyle Talbot and Arthur Space
8. Bomba and the Jungle Girl (1952) with Karen Sharpe
9. Safari Drums (1953) with Emory Parnell
10. The Golden Idol (1954) with Anne Kimbell
11. Killer Leopard (1954) with Beverly Garland
12. Lord of the Jungle (1955) with Wayne Morris
