= Oscar Marion =

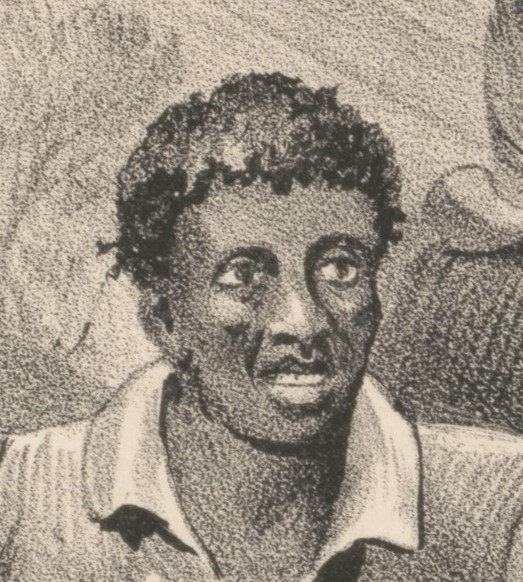

Oscar Marion was an American militiaman during the American Revolutionary War enslaved by Francis Marion. In December 2006, Oscar Marion was recognized as an "African American Patriot" in a ceremony at the U.S. Capitol. A proclamation signed by President George W. Bush expressed the appreciation of a "grateful nation" for Oscar Marion's "devoted and selfless consecration to the service of our country in the Armed Forces of the United States."

It is believed that, following custom, Oscar took the last name of his enslaver; he was one of roughly 200 people (many with the surname "Marion") enslaved by Francis Marion. However, Francis and Oscar may have had a close personal connection. It is believed that Oscar appears in at least one painting of Francis. General Marion Inviting a British Officer to Share His Meal shows a Black man only a few feet from Francis Marion, kneeling at a fire and roasting sweet potatoes as a British officer is invited to dine with the Americans. In the December 2006 ceremony, Bush and several members of Congress recognized the image as representing Oscar Marion.

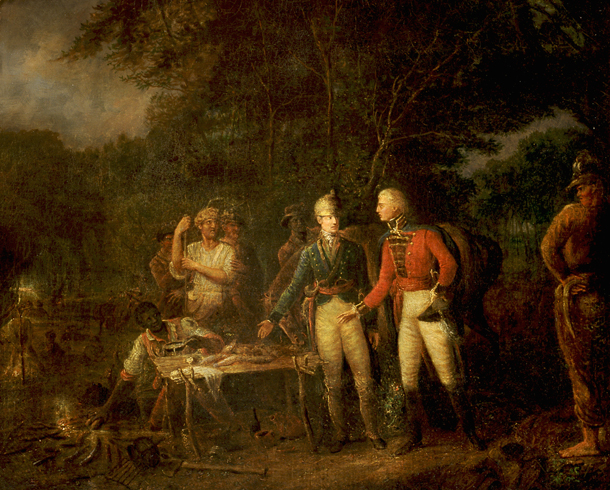
General Marion Inviting a British Officer to Share His Meal by John Blake White; Oscar Marion kneels at the left of the group.

The painting, by South Carolina artist John Blake White, appeared on Confederate banknotes issued in South Carolina. It hangs in the third-floor corridor of the Senate Wing of the U.S. Capitol. Following his seven years of service in the war, Oscar Marion likely returned to Francis Marion's large Berkeley County, South Carolina, plantation. There is no evidence that Oscar ever married or had children.

In the Walt Disney Studios miniseries The Swamp Fox, Smoki Whitfield played Oscar Marion opposite Leslie Nielsen's Francis Marion. Whitfield sang the series' theme song, adding new verses in each of the eight installments to chronicle the characters' latest adventures Of interest, in one episode, Oscar roasts sweet potatoes, the same as in the painting by White.
