= Appointment in Berlin =

1943 film by Alfred E. Green

- Directed by: Alfred E. Green
- Written by: B.P. Fineman; Michael Hogan; Horace McCoy
- Produced by: Samuel Bischoff
- Starring: George Sanders; Marguerite Chapman; Onslow Stevens; Gale Sondergaard
- Cinematography: Franz Planer
- Edited by: Reg Browne; Al Clark
- Music by: Werner R. Heymann
- Production company: Columbia Pictures
- Distributed by: Columbia Pictures
- Release date: July 15, 1943
- Running time: 77 minutes
- Country: United States
- Language: English

Appointment in Berlin (also known as Assignment in Berlin) is a 1943 American war drama film directed by Alfred E. Green and starring George Sanders, Marguerite Chapman and Onslow Stevens. The film's plot follows an R.A.F. officer who infiltrates the German high command by broadcasting a series of pro-Nazi messages.

== Plot ==
After being discharged from the Royal Air Force for anti-British activities, an officer becomes a secret agent for Britain's Secret Service. He ostensibly denounces his country and poses as a radio personality for Nazi Germany. What appear to be his pro-Nazi propaganda broadcasts contain coded messages for the British Secret Service.

== Cast ==
- George Sanders as Wing Cmdr. Keith Wilson
- Marguerite Chapman as Ilse Von Preising
- Onslow Stevens as Rudolph Von Preising
- Gale Sondergaard as Greta Van Leyden
- Gilbert Emery as Gen. Marston
- Lester Matthews as Air Marshal
- John Meredith as Engineer
- Leonard Mudie as MacPhail
- Alan Napier as Col. Patterson
- Georges Renavent as Van der Wyn
- C. Montague Shaw as Langly
- Reginald Sheffield as Miller - Wilson's Butler
- Marek Windheim as Croupier
- Frederick Worlock as Von Ritter - Ministry of Information
- Constance Worth as English Girl
- Franklyn Farnum as R.A.F. Officer
- Jack Lee as Babe Forrester
- Leyland Hodgson as Joiner
- Keith Hitchcock as Bobby
- Steven Geray as Henri Rader
- Jack Gargan as Underground Man
- Arno Frey as Gestapo Captain
- Byron Foulger as Herr Van Leyden
- Herbert Evans as Nightclub Party Guest
- Don Douglas as Bill Banning
- Jean De Briac as Señor Bonti
- Leslie Denison as Detective
- Alec Craig as Smitty - News Vendor
- Gino Corrado as Headwaiter
- Felix Basch as Hoppner

== Production ==
The film's art direction was by Lionel Banks and Walter Holscher.

== Bibliography ==
- Etling, Laurence. Radio in the Movies: A History and Filmography, 1926-2010. McFarland, 2011.
