= The Lion Hunters =

1951 film directed by Ford Beebe

- Directed by: Ford Beebe
- Screenplay by: Ford Beebe; Roy Rockwood (uncredited)
- Based on: characters created by Roy Rockwood in the "Bomba Books"
- Produced by: Walter Mirisch
- Starring: Johnny Sheffield; Morris Ankrum; Ann Todd; Douglas Kennedy "Woody" Strode
- Cinematography: William Sickner, A.S.C.
- Edited by: Otho Lovering
- Music by: Marlin Skiles
- Production company: Monogram Pictures Corporation
- Distributed by: Monogram Pictures
- Release date: March 25, 1951
- Running time: 75 minutes
- Country: United States
- Language: English

The Lion Hunters is a 1951 American low-budget adventure film directed by Ford Beebe and starring Johnny Sheffield, Morris Ankrum, Ann Todd (in her final feature film), Douglas Kennedy and Woody Strode in his first credited role. It is the fifth in the 12-film Bomba, the Jungle Boy series produced by Monogram Pictures, based on the Bomba series of juvenile adventure books. The film's sets were designed by the art directors Dave Milton and Vin Taylor.

== Plot ==
A lion trapper and his daughter Jean rendezvous with his hardheaded partner in the African jungle. Bomba befriends Jean and explains why trapping lions is wrong, and she comes to understand him. He later sabotages the men's plans, and with assistance from local Masai natives and lions, expels them from the area.

== Cast ==
- Johnny Sheffield as Bomba
- Morris Ankrum as Tom Forbes
- Ann Todd as Jean Forbes
- Douglas Kennedy as Marty Martin
- Smoki Whitfield as Jonas
- Robert Davis as Lohu
- Woodrow Strode as Walu
