= Bomba on Panther Island =

1949 film directed by Ford Beebe

- Film poster
- Directed by: Ford Beebe
- Screenplay by: Ford Beebe
- Based on: Roy Rockwood (based on characters created by)
- Produced by: Walter Mirisch
- Starring: Johnny Sheffield
- Cinematography: William A. Sickner
- Edited by: Richard V. Heermance (as Richard Heermance)
- Color process: Black and white
- Production company: Monogram Pictures
- Distributed by: Monogram Pictures
- Release date: December 18, 1949
- Running time: 76 minutes
- Country: United States
- Language: English

Bomba on Panther Island is a 1949 American adventure film based on the Bomba series of juvenile adventure books. The film is directed by Ford Beebe and stars Johnny Sheffield. It is the second in the 12-film Bomba series following Bomba the Jungle Boy (1949).

== Plot ==
A developer brings his sister with him to Africa and plans to build a plantation. Commissioner Barnes and Eli appear to lend him a hand, but unfortunately for them (and Bomba's monkey friend) a rogue panther is on the loose. Bomba, with revenge on his mind, is hunting the panther when he comes upon the construction site. He gets sidetracked by the sister and her exotic traveling companion, but recovers in time to battle the panther.

== Cast ==
- Johnny Sheffield as Bomba
- Allene Roberts as Judy Maitland
- Lita Baron as Losana
- Harry Lewis as Comm. Andy Barnes
- Charles Irwin as Robert Maitland
- Smoki Whitfield as Eli
