= Gilbert Emery =

American actor

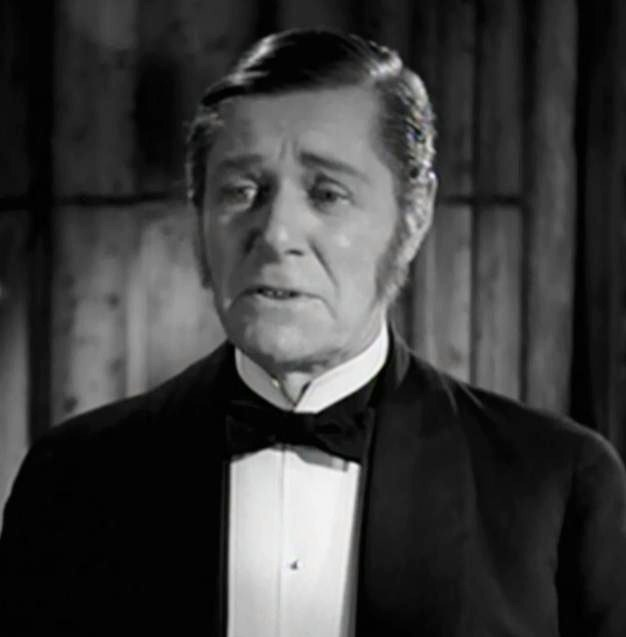
- Emery in Little Lord Fauntleroy (1936)
- Born: Gilbert Emery Bensley Pottle; June 11, 1875; Naples, New York, U.S.
- Died: October 28, 1945 (aged 70); Los Angeles, California, U.S.
- Other name: Emery Pottle
- Education: Amherst College
- Occupation: Actor
- Spouse: Juliet Wilbour Tompkins (m. 1904; div. 1905)

Gilbert Emery Bensley Pottle (June 11, 1875 – October 28, 1945), known professionally as Gilbert Emery, was an American actor who appeared in over 80 movies from 1921 to his death in 1945. He was also a playwright, author of seven Broadway plays from 1921 to 1933.

== Early years ==
Gilbert Emery Bensley Pottle was born June 11, 1875, in Naples, New York, to William L. and Hariette (Gilbert) Pottle. He prepared for college at Naples High School and at the Normal School in Oneonta, New York. He graduated from Amherst College in the class of 1899.

== Career ==
Pottle started out as a short story writer, using the name Emery Pottle, and he later wrote plays. From 1899 to 1900 he was an instructor in English and public speaking at Beloit Academy in Wisconsin. In 1900 he was a reporter for the Morning Sun in New York City; from 1900-1901 he worked for the Evening Post; and from 1901-1903 he worked for Criterion Magazine. He was an instructor in English at Columbia University and a writer.

During World War I, Pottle was a member of the American Expeditionary Forces' Liaison Service, serving with French Balloon Companies 39, 49 and 74. He was later a member of the Paris Peace Conference from 1918 to 1919, and a member of the Interallied Food Commission in 1919.

He wrote a number of books in his early years, including Handicapped, The Little Village, and The Little House. He also wrote poems and short stories for magazines and several plays. Much of his writing was under the pen name Gilbert Emery.

Emery began his career as a playwright in 1921 with several of his plays produced on Broadway into the 1930's. He also acted in several other productions. His first play, "The Hero", was revived in 2014 to acclaimed reviews including the New York Times .

== Personal life ==
On November 22, 1904, Emery (using the name Emery Pottle) married Juliet Wilbour Tompkins, a writer, in New York. Tompkins sued for divorce in March 1905.

== Death ==
Emery died on October 28, 1945, in Los Angeles, California and is buried in Rose Ridge Cemetery in Naples, NY.

== Playwright ==
"Far-Away Horses" (Mar 21, 1933 - Mar 1933) (also "staged by")

"Housewarming" (Apr 07, 1932 - Apr 1932)

"Say When" (Jun 26, 1928 - Jul 07, 1928) ("Based on a play by Gilbert Emery")

"Love in a Mist" (Apr 12, 1926 - Jul 17, 1926) (also director)

"Episode" (Feb 04, 1925 - Feb 1925) (also actor)

"Tarnish" (Oct 01, 1923 - May 1924)

"The Hero" (Mar 14, 1921 - Mar 1921), (Sep 05, 1921 - Nov 1921)

== Filmography ==
From 1921 until his death in 1945, Gilbert Emery acted in at least 88 films, including:

Year	Title	Role	Notes
1921	Cousin Kate	Heath Desmond	(Film debut)
1929	Behind That Curtain	Sir Frederick Bruce	
1930	A Lady's Morals	Broughm	
1931	The Lady Refuses	Sir Gerald Courtney	
1931	The Yellow Ticket	Sir Hubert, British Ambassador	Uncredited
1931	The Ruling Voice	Andrew Gregory	
1932	Okay America!	Secretary John Drake	
1932	A Farewell to Arms	British Major	
1934	All of Me	The Dean	
1934	Coming Out Party	Herbert Emerson Stanhope	
1934	The House of Rothschild	Prime Minister	
1934	One More River	The Judge	
1934	Now and Forever	James Higginson	
1934	The Man Who Reclaimed His Head	His Excellency	Uncredited
1935	Clive of India	Mr. Sullivan	
1935	Cardinal Richelieu	Noble	
1935	Goin' to Town	Winslow	
1935	Harmony Lane	Mr. Foster	
1935	Peter Ibbetson	Wilkins	
1935	Magnificent Obsession	Doctor Ramsay	
1936	Wife vs. Secretary	Simpson	
1936	Little Lord Fauntleroy	Purvis	
1936	Dracula's Daughter	Sir Basil Humphrey	
1936	Bullets or Ballots	Mr. Thorndyke	
1937	The Great Barrier	George Stephen	
1937	Souls at Sea	Captain Martisel	
1937	The Life of Emile Zola	Minister of War	
1937	Double or Nothing	Mr. Mitchell	
1938	The Buccaneer	Captain Lockyer	
1938	Lord Jeff	Magistrate	
1938	Storm Over Bengal	Colonel Torrance	
1939	The Saint Strikes Back	Martin Eastman	
1939	The Lady's from Kentucky	Pinckney Rodell	
1939	Nurse Edith Cavell	Brand Whitlock	
1939	Raffles	Bingham	
1940	The House of the Seven Gables	Gerald Pyncheon	
1940	Waterloo Bridge	Colonel at Luncheon	Uncredited
1940	Anne of Windy Poplars	Stephen Pringle	
1940	A Dispatch from Reuters	Lord Palmerston	Uncredited
1940	South of Suez	Manders	
1941	Adam Had Four Sons	Dr. Lane	
1941	Rage in Heaven	Mr. Black	
1941	That Hamilton Woman	Lord Spencer	
1941	A Woman's Face	Associate Judge	
1941	Singapore Woman	Sir Stanley Moore	
1941	The Great Awakening	School Principal	
1941	Sundown	Ashburton	
1942	The Remarkable Andrew	Thomas Jefferson	
1942	Escape from Hong Kong	Col. J.A. Crossley	
1942	The Loves of Edgar Allan Poe	Thomas Jefferson	
1942	King of the Mounties	Commissioner Morrison	
1943	Sherlock Holmes in Washington	Sir Henry Marchmont	Uncredited
1943	Appointment in Berlin	Gen. Marston	Uncredited
1943	The Return of the Vampire	Dr. Walter Saunders	
1944	Between Two Worlds	Benjamin Cliveden-Banks	
1945	The Brighton Strangler	Dr. Manby	Final film
