= Johnny Sheffield =

American child actor (1931–2010)

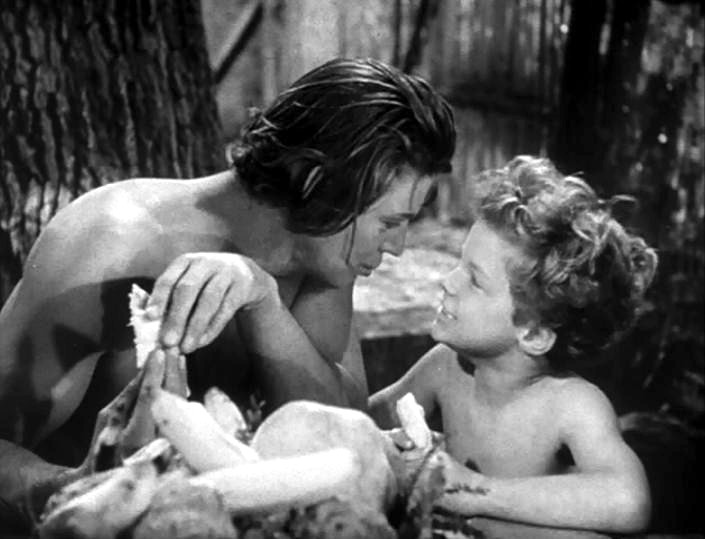
- Sheffield and Johnny Weissmuller in Tarzan Finds a Son! (1939)
- Born: John Matthew Sheffield Cassan; April 11, 1931; Pasadena, California, U.S.
- Died: October 15, 2010 (aged 79); Chula Vista, California, U.S.
- Education: UCLA business degree
- Occupation: Actor
- Years active: 1939–1955
- Spouse: Patricia Sheffield (m. 1959)
- Children: 3
- Father: Reginald Sheffield

Johnny Sheffield (born John Matthew Sheffield Cassan, April 11, 1931 – October 15, 2010) was an American actor who, between 1939 and 1947, portrayed Boy in the Tarzan film series and, between 1949 and 1955, played Bomba, the Jungle Boy.

== Early life ==
Sheffield was born John Matthew Sheffield Cassan on April 11, 1931, in Pasadena, California, the second child of English-American actor Reginald Sheffield and Louise Van Loon. His older sister was Mary Alice Sheffield Cassan and his younger brother was William Hart Sheffield Cassan (actor Billy Sheffield). His father was himself a former juvenile performer when he came to the United States from his native England.

In 1938, Sheffield became a child star after he was cast in the juvenile lead of a West Coast production of the highly successful Broadway play On Borrowed Time, which starred Dudley Digges and featured Victor Moore as Gramps. Sheffield played the role of Pud.

== Tarzan and other films ==
The following year, his father read an article in The Hollywood Reporter that asked, "Have you a Tarzan Jr. in your backyard?" He believed he did and set up an interview. MGM was searching for a suitable youngster to play the adopted son of Tarzan in its next jungle movie with stars Johnny Weissmuller and Maureen O'Sullivan. When he was 7 years old, Sheffield was taken to an audition where Weissmuller chose him over more than 300 juvenile actors interviewed for the part of "Boy" in Tarzan Finds a Son! (1939). Newspaper articles at the time mentioned erroneously that Sheffield was only 5 years old. In that same year, Sheffield appeared in the Busby Berkeley movie musical Babes in Arms with Mickey Rooney and Judy Garland, classmates of his at the studio school.

He appeared with many other performers over the years, including Jeanette MacDonald, Pat O'Brien, Cesar Romero, Ronald Reagan and Beverly Garland. He played the childhood version of the title character in Knute Rockne, All American, perhaps the most prestigious film in which he had a role.

Sheffield played Boy in three Tarzan movies at MGM, and in another five after the star, Weissmuller, and production of the movie series moved to RKO. Brenda Joyce played Jane in the last three Tarzan movies in which Sheffield appeared.

== Bomba and Bantu ==
After he outgrew the role of Boy, the teenaged Sheffield went on to star in his own jungle movie series for Allied Artists. The first entry in this series, Bomba, the Jungle Boy was released in 1949 with co-star Peggy Ann Garner. In all, he appeared as Bomba 12 times, more than any other character he portrayed. Sheffield retired from films at age 24 after starring in his twelfth Bomba film in 1955 ("Lord of the Jungle").

He then made a pilot for a television series, Bantu, the Zebra Boy, which was created, produced, and directed by his father, Reginald Sheffield. Although the production values were high compared to other TV jungle shows of the day, a sponsor was not found and the show was not taken up as a weekly series. In his later years, Sheffield sold bootlegged copies of the pilot to collectors on videotape.

== Post-Hollywood careers ==
Sheffield decided to leave the industry and enrolled in college. He lived and worked for a time in Arizona. He married Patricia Sheffield in 1959 in Yuma, Arizona. The couple had three children: Patrick, Stewart, and Regina.

After leaving show business, Sheffield completed a business degree at UCLA. Turning his attention to other fields, he involved himself variously in farming, real estate, and construction. For a time, he was a representative for the Santa Monica Seafood Company importing lobsters from Baja California in Mexico.

In his later years Johnny Sheffield lived in Southern California, where he wrote articles about his Hollywood years and sold copies of the TV pilot Bantu, the Zebra Boy on video.

== Death ==
Sheffield's wife, Patty, said that he fell from a ladder while pruning a palm tree. Though his injuries seemed minor, he died of a heart attack four hours later on October 15, 2010, in Chula Vista, California, aged 79. He was remembered by the New York Times as "the character Boy in the Tarzan movies of the 1930s and ’40s."

== Filmography ==
Year	Title	Role	Notes
1939	Tarzan Finds a Son!	Boy	
1939	Babes in Arms	Bobs	
1940	Little Orvie	Orvie Stone	
1940	Lucky Cisco Kid	Tommy Lawrence	
1940	Knute Rockne, All American	Knute Rockne (at age 7)	
1941	Million Dollar Baby	Alvie Grayson	
1941	Tarzan's Secret Treasure	Boy	
1942	Tarzan's New York Adventure	Boy	
1943	Tarzan Triumphs	Boy	
1943	Tarzan's Desert Mystery	Boy	
1945	Roughly Speaking	Frankie (at age 9)	Uncredited
1945	Tarzan and the Amazons	Boy	
1946	Tarzan and the Leopard Woman	Boy	
1947	Tarzan and the Huntress	Boy	
1949	The Sun Comes Up	Music Lover	Uncredited
1949	Bomba, the Jungle Boy	Bomba	
1949	Bomba on Panther Island	Bomba	
1950	The Lost Volcano	Bomba	
1950	Bomba and the Hidden City	Bomba	
1951	The Lion Hunters	Bomba	
1951	Bomba and the Elephant Stampede	Bomba	
1952	African Treasure	Bomba	
1952	Bomba and the Jungle Girl	Bomba	
1953	Safari Drums	Bomba	
1954	The Golden Idol	Bomba	
1954	Killer Leopard	Bomba	
1955	Lord of the Jungle	Bomba	Final film role

== Bibliography ==
- Best, Marc. Those Endearing Young Charms: Child Performers of the Screen (South Brunswick and New York: Barnes & Co., 1971), pp. 235–239.
- Holmstrom, John. The Moving Picture Boy: An International Encyclopaedia from 1895 to 1995, Norwich, Michael Russell, 1996, pp. 175–176.
- Dye, David. Child and Youth Actors: Filmography of Their Entire Careers, 1914-1985. Jefferson, NC: McFarland & Co., 1988, pp. 213.
