= Bomba and the Hidden City =

1950 film

- Directed by: Ford Beebe
- Screenplay by: Carroll Young
- Based on: characters created by Roy Rockwood
- Produced by: Walter Mirisch
- Starring: Johnny Sheffield; Sue England
- Cinematography: William A. Sickner (as William Sickner)
- Edited by: Roy A. Livingston (as Roy Livingston)
- Music by: Ozzie Caswell
- Color process: Black and white
- Production company: Monogram Pictures
- Distributed by: Monogram Pictures
- Release date: September 24, 1950
- Running time: 71 minutes
- Country: United States
- Language: English

Bomba and the Hidden City is a 1950 American adventure film based on the Bomba, the Jungle Boy series of juvenile adventure books. It is the fourth film in the 12-film Bomba series.

The film was titled simply The Hidden City in its advertising and on the film's title screen.

== Plot ==
A photographer and his guide meet a corrupt emir with a dirty secret. Only Bomba knows the truth and the emir wants him silenced. Bomba defeats the emir and his henchmen, returning a lost princess to her throne.

== Cast ==
- Johnny Sheffield as Bomba
- Sue England as Zidah
- Paul Guilfoyle as Hassan
- Damian O'Flynn as Dennis Johnson
- Leon Belasco as Raschid
- Charles La Torre as Abdullah
- Smoki Whitfield as Hadji
