= The Lost Volcano =

1950 film directed by Ford Beebe

- Directed by: Ford Beebe
- Written by: Ford Beebe
- Based on: Roy Rockwood (based upon characters created by)
- Produced by: Walter Mirisch
- Starring: Johnny Sheffield
- Cinematography: Marcel Le Picard
- Edited by: Richard V. Heermance (as Richard Heermance)
- Music by: Ozzie Caswell
- Color process: Black and white
- Production company: Monogram Pictures
- Distributed by: Monogram Pictures
- Release date: June 25, 1950
- Running time: 67 minutes
- Country: United States
- Language: English

The Lost Volcano is a 1950 American adventure film. It is the third in the 12-film Bomba, the Jungle Boy series, based on the Bomba series of juvenile adventure books.

== Plot ==
The parents of a young boy named David Gordon think that Bomba is just David's imaginary friend. David is kidnapped by a pair of crooked jungle guides who are searching for a lost city's treasure. Bomba rescues David, battles a crocodile and, with the help of an erupting volcano and a python, defeats the villains.

== Cast ==
- Johnny Sheffield as Bomba
- Donald Woods as Paul Gordon
- Marjorie Lord as Ruth Gordon
- John Ridgely as Fred Barton
- Tommy Ivo as David Gordon
- Elena Verdugo as Nona
- Don C. Harvey as Fred Higgins (as Don Harvey)
- Grandon Rhodes as Dr. Charles Langley
- Robert Lewis as Daniel

== Reception ==
The Los Angeles Times wrote: "Every small boy who sees this film will wish he were in David's shoes, for the production is a small boy's adventure paradise, as, along with jungle man Bomba, the lad swings from tree to tree. Pretty soon, if this business keeps up, small boys going through forests will he looking up in the trees for ape men like those heroes. Indeed, Tarzan now has a formidable rival in Bomba."
