= Safari Drums =

1953 film directed by Ford Beebe

- Directed by: Ford Beebe
- Written by: Ford Beebe
- Produced by: Ford Beebe
- Starring: Johnny Sheffield
- Cinematography: Harry Neumann
- Edited by: Walter Hannemann
- Music by: Marlin Skiles
- Color process: Black and white
- Production company: Monogram Pictures
- Distributed by: Allied Artists
- Release date: June 21, 1953
- Running time: 71 minutes
- Country: United States
- Language: English

Safari Drums is a 1953 American adventure film and starring Johnny Sheffield as Bomba. It was the ninth in the 12-film Bomba, the Jungle Boy series, based on the Bomba series of juvenile adventure books.

== Plot ==
A millionaire brings a tiger and film crew to Africa in hopes of staging a battle between the tiger and a lion. Commissioner Barnes learns that one of the crew is a murderer and asks Bomba to find out which one. The Lost Volcano erupts again (this film makes use of previously seen footage) and there is a battle between a lion and a tiger.

== Cast ==
- Johnny Sheffield as Bomba
- Douglas Kennedy Brad Morton
- Barbara Bestar as Peggy Jethro
- Emory Parnell as Larry Conrad
- Paul Marion as Steve
- Leonard Mudie as Deputy Commissioner Barnes
- Smoki Whitfield as Eli
- Russ Conway as Collins

== Reception ==
The Los Angeles Times called this "one of the most exciting jungle pictures you have ever seen."
