= Allene Roberts =

American actress (1928–2019)

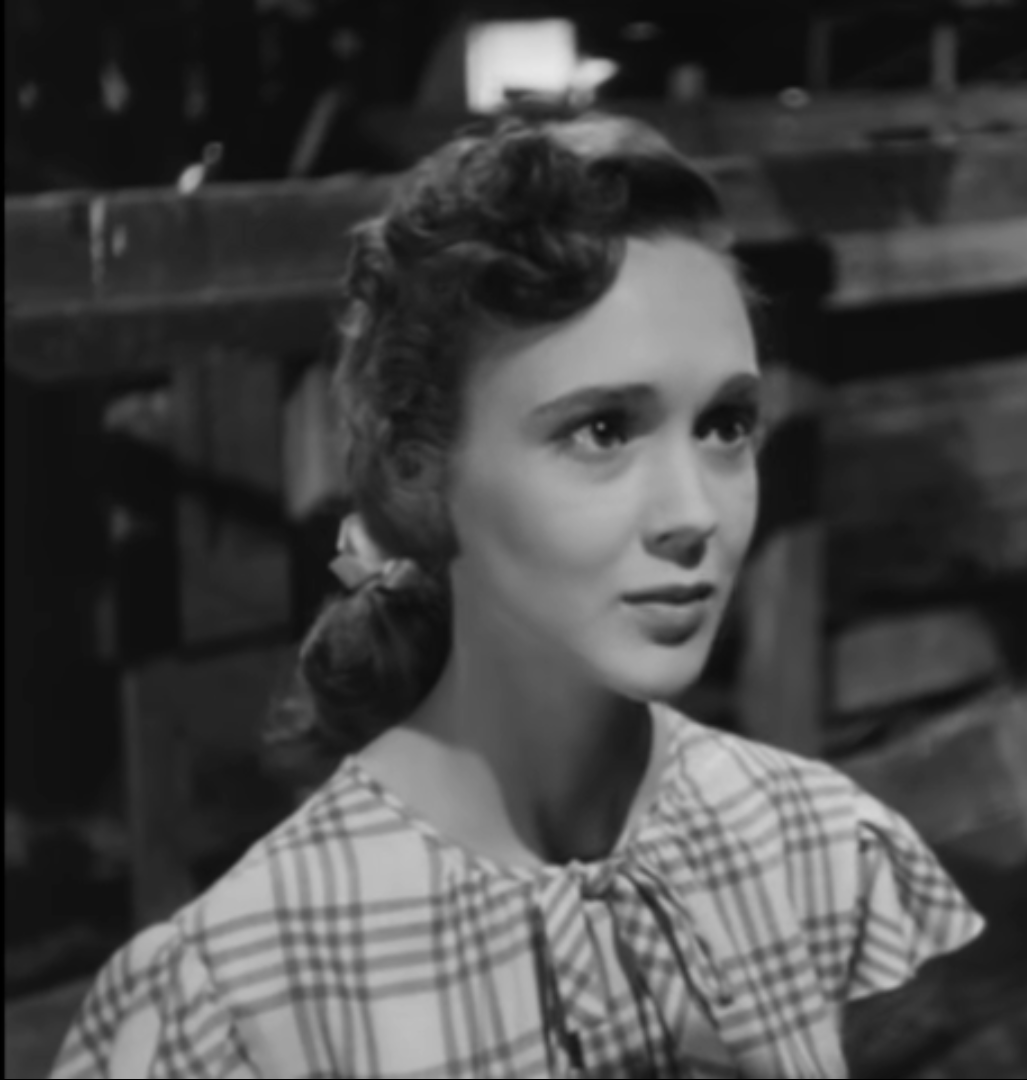
- Roberts in The Red House (1947)
- Born: Emma Allene Roberts; September 1, 1928; Birmingham, Alabama, U.S.
- Died: May 9, 2019 (aged 90); Huntsville, Alabama, U.S
- Occupation: Actress
- Years active: 1947–1957
- Spouse: Ralph Cochran (m. 1955; died 1989)
- Children: 4

Emma Allene Roberts (September 1, 1928 – May 9, 2019) was an American actress.

== Early years ==
Roberts was born in Birmingham, Alabama, the daughter of Frank W. Roberts and Velma Swain Roberts. She had three older brothers. Her father died when she was 9 years old. Her activities included playing piano, singing, and tap dancing. She graduated from Hollywood High School.

In 1941, she won the "America's Most Charming Child" contest sponsored by the New York Daily Mirror, receiving $1,000 in cash and a $1,000 contract with Warner Bros. studio. The contest initially had more than 60,000 entrants; she won after that group had been reduced to 50 semi-finalists and 12 finalists.

== Career ==
Roberts appeared in twelve movies from 1947 to 1954, and on TV in Four Star Playhouse, Adventures of Superman and Dragnet. Her first big picture was The Red House (1947) starring Rory Calhoun, Julie London and Edward G. Robinson. That movie was considered by the critics to be the "sleeper hit" of the year.

Roberts' other films included Knock on Any Door (1949), Union Station (1950), and Bomba on Panther Island (1949).

== Death ==
On May 9, 2019, Roberts died in Huntsville, Alabama, at age 90.

== Filmography ==
Year	Title	Role	Notes
1947	The Red House	Meg	
1948	The Sign of the Ram	Jane St. Aubyn	
1948	Michael O'Halloran	Lily Nelson	
1949	Knock on Any Door	Emma	
1949	Bomba on Panther Island	Judy Maitland	
1950	Union Station	Lorna Murchison	
1951	A Wonderful Life	Mary Wood	Short
1951	Santa Fe	Ella Sue Canfield	
1951	The Hoodlum	Rosa	
1952	Kid Monk Baroni	Emily Brooks	
1952	Thunderbirds	Margie Hanford	
1952	The Blazing Forest	Milly	Uncredited
