= Tarzan's New York Adventure =

1942 film by Richard Thorpe

- Theatrical release poster
- Directed by: Richard Thorpe
- Written by: William R. Lipman; Myles Connolly
- Based on: Characters created by Edgar Rice Burroughs
- Produced by: Frederick Stephani
- Starring: Johnny Weissmuller; Maureen O'Sullivan; Johnny Sheffield
- Cinematography: Sidney Wagner
- Edited by: Gene Ruggiero
- Music by: David Snell
- Color process: Black and white
- Production company: Metro-Goldwyn-Mayer
- Distributed by: Loew's Inc.
- Release date: May 1942
- Running time: 71 minutes
- Country: United States
- Language: English
- Budget: $707,000
- Box office: $2,729,000

Tarzan's New York Adventure (also known as Tarzan Against the World) is a 1942 American adventure film from Metro Goldwyn Mayer, produced by Frederick Stephani, directed by Richard Thorpe, that stars Johnny Weissmuller and Maureen O'Sullivan. This was the sixth and final film in MGM's Tarzan series and was the studio's last Tarzan feature until 1957's Tarzan and the Lost Safari. Although Tarzan's New York Adventure includes scenes set in New York, as well as the customary jungle sequences, it is yet another Tarzan production primarily shot on MGM's back lots.

== Plot ==
A cargo aircraft lands atop Tarzan's escarpment in Africa, looking for animals. While trapping lions, the three men aboard meet with Tarzan, Jane, and their adopted son Boy. Watching Boy's tricks with three young elephants, Buck Rand, the head of a circus in the United States, realizes that Boy would be a great act. When they are attacked by natives, who set a large jungle fire, it appears that Tarzan and Jane have perished in that fire. The men take Boy aboard their plane and they take-off, as the natives look on in wonderment. The chimpanzee Cheeta is able to awaken Tarzan and Jane before they are burned to death. Cheeta tells Tarzan that Boy left with the men on the aircraft.

Tarzan, Jane, and Cheeta track across the jungle and, flying across the Atlantic, eventually end up in New York City. Tarzan is befuddled by the lifestyle and gadgetry of civilization and displays his quaint, noble savage ways. He complains about the necessity of wearing clothing, commenting that an opera singer that he hears on a "noisy box", "Woman sick! Scream for witch doctor!", and expressing his wonderment at taxi cabs. Tarzan also comments that various African-Americans he sees making a living throughout New York City are from this or that tribe back in his and Jane's African home.

Tarzan and Jane attempt to get Boy back by legal means. A judge asks Tarzan what he considers to be the important things that he needs to teach his adopted son. Unfortunately, the circus retains an unscrupulous lawyer, who tricks Jane into admitting that Boy was not born in the jungle and is not her actual child, provoking Tarzan into attacking him in the courtroom. Tarzan makes a daring escape out a window onto a ledge, and a rooftop chase by the police immediately follows. This eventually leads to Tarzan being forced to make a spectacular 200 foot high dive from the Brooklyn Bridge into the East River to avoid being arrested.

Tarzan locates the circus where Boy is being held and enlists the aid of the elephants, who have been chained by their ankles to stakes. He calls to them with his jungle yell, and they take their revenge on their tormentors by tearing free from the chains and destroying the circus. In the ensuing bedlam that follows, Tarzan is able to rescue Boy. Before their return to Africa, the judge grants Tarzan and Jane full legal custody of their adopted son.

== Cast ==
- Johnny Weissmuller as Tarzan
- Maureen O'Sullivan as Jane
- Johnny Sheffield as Boy
- Virginia Grey as Connie Beach
- Charles Bickford as Buck Rand, circus owner
- Paul Kelly as Jimmie Shields, pilot
- Elmo Lincoln as circus roustabout
- Chill Wills as Manchester Montford
- Cy Kendall as Colonel Ralph Sergeant
- Russell Hicks as Judge Abbotson
- Jackie the Lion
- Howard C. Hickman as Blake Norton, Tarzan's lawyer (credited as Howard Hickman)
- Charles Lane as Gould Beaton, Sargent's lawyer
- Miles Mander as portmaster
- Anne Jeffreys as young woman
- William Forrest as inspector at airport
- Willie Fung as Sun Lee, the Chinese tailor
- Marjorie Deanne as cigarette girl
- Eddie Kane as Eddie, the headwaiter
- Mantan Moreland as Sam, the nightclub janitor
- Dorothy Morris as hat check girl

== Production ==
With the working title Tarzan Against the World, film production began on December 17, 1941, continuing to January 28, 1942, mainly on the MGM backlot/ranch. Additional scenes were shot in early February 1942.

Popular mythology claims that Johnny Weissmuller did his own high-dive stunt in Tarzan's New York Adventure. In the film, an escaping Tarzan jumps 200 feet (61 m) from the top of the Brooklyn Bridge, but according to ERBzine and research on Edgar Rice Burroughs, the shot was filmed by cameraman Jack Smith on top of the MGM scenic tower on lot 3, using a dummy plunging into a tank of water.

Tarzan's New York Adventure was the last in the series for MGM, and Maureen O'Sullivan's last motion picture until 1948. She wanted to devote more time to her seven children. Of interest is the uncredited appearance (as a circus roustabout) of Elmo Lincoln, who in 1918 was the first actor to star as Tarzan.

Three real aircraft of the era are prominently featured in Tarzan's New York Adventure: "G-AECT", a mockup of a Lockheed 12A with a single tail, is used for the African flying scenes; later a Boeing 314 Clipper (daytime) and a Martin M-130 (nighttime) carry Tarzan and Jane as they fly across the Atlantic to New York City.

== Reception ==
=== Box office ===
Tarzan's New York Adventure earned $1,404,000 in the US and Canada and $1,315,000 elsewhere during its initial theatrical run, making MGM a profit of $985,000.

=== Critical reception ===
Film critic Theodore Strauss of The New York Times said the change of outfit did nothing to change the obvious. "With an African yodel and a tailor-made suit, our old jungle friend is back in Tarzan's New York Adventure, currently chilling the veins of reviewers and 12-year-olds at the Capitol. Although we're not quite certain that the small-fry approved of Tarzan's temporary conversion to decidedly dapper duds of the sort more commonly seen at the corner of Hollywood and Vine, he probably will be forgiven. In Tarzan's case, clothes do not make the man".

In a recent appraisal of Tarzan's New York Adventure, Leonard Maltin noted some redeeming factors, calling the film "... an amusing entry. Tarzan's first encounter with indoor plumbing is truly memorable".

The film review aggregator website Rotten Tomatoes reports an approval rating of 100%, based on five reviews, with the film receiving a rating average of 7/10.
