= Killer Leopard =

1954 film directed by Ford Beebe

- Directed by: Ford Beebe
- Written by: Ford Beebe
- Produced by: Walter Mirisch; Ford Beebe
- Starring: Johnny Sheffield; Beverly Garland; Leonard Mudie
- Cinematography: Harry Neumann
- Edited by: John C. Fuller
- Music by: Marlin Skiles
- Production company: Allied Artists Pictures
- Distributed by: Allied Artists Pictures
- Release date: August 22, 1954
- Running time: 70 minutes
- Country: United States
- Language: English

Killer Leopard is a 1954 American adventure film directed by Ford Beebe and starring Johnny Sheffield and Beverly Garland. It was the eleventh in the twelve-film Bomba, the Jungle Boy series made by Allied Artists, and based on the Bomba series of juvenile adventure books.

== Plot ==
Bomba is hunting a rogue leopard when Commissioner Barnes asks him to assist a movie starlet trying to find her lost husband. The husband, wanting nothing to do with his famous wife, isn't lost but is in Africa attempting to use money he embezzled to purchase illicit diamonds.

== Cast ==
- Johnny Sheffield as Bomba
- Beverly Garland as Linda Winters
- Donald Murphy as Fred Winters
- Barry Bernard as Charlie Pulham
- Leonard Mudie as Deputy Commissioner Andy Barnes
- Smoki Whitfield as Eli
- Russ Conway as Sgt. Maitland
- Rory Mallinson as Deevers
- Roy Glenn as Daniel
