= Bomba and the Jungle Girl =

1952 film directed by Ford Beebe

- Film poster
- Directed by: Ford Beebe
- Written by: Ford Beebe
- Produced by: Walter Mirisch; Associate producer: Edward Morey Jr.
- Starring: Johnny Sheffield
- Cinematography: Harry Neumann
- Edited by: William Austin
- Music by: Raoul Kraushaar
- Color process: Black and white
- Production company: Monogram Pictures
- Distributed by: Monogram Pictures
- Release date: December 7, 1952
- Running time: 70 minutes
- Country: United States
- Language: English

Bomba and the Jungle Girl is a 1952 American adventure film directed by Ford Beebe and starring Johnny Sheffield. It is the eighth film of 12 in the Bomba, the Jungle Boy film series, based on the Bomba series of juvenile adventure books.

== Plot ==
Bomba wants to learn the identity of his parents. He starts with Cody Casson's diary and follows the trail to a native village. An ancient blind woman informs him that his parents, along with the village's true ruler, were murdered by the current chieftain and his daughter. With the aid of an inspector and his daughter, Bomba battles the usurpers in the cave where his parents were buried.

== Cast ==
- Johnny Sheffield as Bomba
- Karen Sharpe as Linda Ward
- Walter Sande as Mr. Ward
- Suzette Harbin as Boru
- Martin Wilkins as Chief Gamboso
- Morris Buchanan as Kokoli
- Leonard Mudie as Commissioner Barnes
- Don Blackman as Boru's lieutenant
