= The Golden Idol =

1954 film directed by Ford Beebe

- Directed by: Ford Beebe
- Written by: Ford Beebe
- Based on: Based on characters created by Roy Rockwood
- Produced by: Ford Beebe
- Starring: Johnny Sheffield
- Cinematography: Harry Neumann
- Edited by: John C. Fuller
- Color process: Black and white
- Production company: Allied Artists Pictures
- Distributed by: Allied Artists Pictures
- Release date: January 10, 1954
- Running time: 71 minutes
- Country: United States
- Language: English

The Golden Idol is a 1954 American adventure film directed by Ford Beebe and starring Johnny Sheffield, Anne Kimbell and Paul Guilfoyle. It was the tenth in the 12-film Bomba, the Jungle Boy series, based on the Bomba series of juvenile adventure books. It was produced and distributed by Allied Artists

== Plot ==
Prince Ali wants the Golden Idol of Watusi and hires a ruthless hunter to get it for him. Bomba has the idol and, with the help of Commissioner Barnes, Eli, and a beautiful archaeologist from the British Museum (Anne Kimbell), he foils Ali's plans. Ali and the hunter are noticeably more cold-blooded than most of Bomba's adversaries.

== Cast ==
- Johnny Sheffield as Bomba
- Anne Kimbell as Karen Marsh
- Paul Guilfoyle as Ali Ben Mamoud
- Leonard Mudie as Commissioner Andy Barnes
- Smoki Whitfield as Eli
- Rick Vallin as Abdullah
- Lane Bradford as Joe Hawkins
