= Roy Rockwood =

House pseudonym used by the Stratemeyer Syndicate

Roy Rockwood was a house pseudonym used by Edward Stratemeyer and the Stratemeyer Syndicate for boy's adventure books. The name is most well-remembered for the Bomba the Jungle Boy series.

== Series ==
The following series used the Roy Rockwood pseudonym:

- Deep Sea (1905–1908; the three books in the series were republished as the first three Dave Fearless books)
- Dave Fearless (1905–1927)
- Great Marvel (1906–1935)
- Speedwell Boys (1913–1915)
- Dave Dashaway (1913–1915)
- Bomba, the Jungle Boy (1926–1938)

Edward Stratemeyer used the pseudonym for the serialized story Joe Johnson, the Bicycle Wonder (1895), published in Young Sports of America. He also used Roy Rockwood for Lost in the Land of Ice (1900-1901 – later published as a book under the Capt. Ralph Bonehill pen name) and The Rival Ocean Divers (1901), both serialized in Golden Hours. The Rival Ocean Divers became the first book in the Deep Sea series, and was later used in the Dave Fearless series.

== Known authors ==
The Dave Dashaway series was written by Weldon J. Cobb. Howard R. Garis contributed to the Great Marvel series. In 1926 Leslie McFarlane was hired to write a Dave Fearless novel. John Duffield wrote many of the Bomba, the Jungle Boy novels.

== See also ==
- Victor Appleton
