= List of feature film series with 11 to 20 entries =

This articles lists feature film series having between 11 and 20 entries.

Key:

- (A) – Film series is 100% animated
- (a) – Film series is not 100% animated and has live action in a sequel or prequel
- (TV) – made-for-TV
- (V) – direct-to-video
- (*) – TV series attached

== 11 ==
=== A ===
- The Aldrich Family *
  1. What a Life (1939)
  2. Life with Henry (1940)
  3. Henry Aldrich for President (1941)
  4. Henry Aldrich, Editor (1942)
  5. Henry and Dizzy (1942)
  6. Henry Aldrich Swings It (1943)
  7. Henry Aldrich Gets Glamour (1943)
  8. Henry Aldrich Haunts a House (1943)
  9. Henry Aldrich, Boy Scout (1944)
  10. Henry Aldrich Plays Cupid (1944)
  11. Henry Aldrich's Little Secret (1944)

=== B ===
- Boonie Bears (A)
  1. Boonie Bears: To the Rescue (2014)
  2. Boonie Bears: Mystical Winter (2015)
  3. Boonie Bears: The Big Top Secret (2016)
  4. Boonie Bears: Entangled Worlds (2017)
  5. Boonie Bears: The Big Shrink (2018)
  6. Boonie Bears: Blast Into the Past (2019)
  7. Boonie Bears: The Wild Life (2021)
  8. Boonie Bears: Back to Earth (2022)
  9. Boonie Bears: Guardian Code (2023)
  10. Boonie Bears: Time Twist (2024)
  11. Boonie Bears: Future Reborn (2025)

=== C ===
- Children of the Corn
  1. Children of the Corn (1984)
  2. Children of the Corn II: The Final Sacrifice (1992)
  3. Children of the Corn III: Urban Harvest (1995) (V)
  4. Children of the Corn IV: The Gathering (1996) (V)
  5. Children of the Corn V: Fields of Terror (1998) (V)
  6. Children of the Corn 666: Isaac's Return (1999) (V)
  7. Children of the Corn: Revelation (2001) (V)
  8. Children of the Corn (2009) (TV) (remake)
  9. Children of the Corn: Genesis (2011) (V) (reboot)
  10. Children of the Corn: Runaway (2018) (V) (reboot)
  11. Children of the Corn (2020) (reboot)
- Coffin Joe
  1. At Midnight I'll Take Your Soul (1963)
  2. This Night I'll Possess Your Corpse (1967)
  3. The Strange World of Coffin Joe (1968)
  4. Awakening of the Beast (1970)
  5. The End of Man (1970)
  6. The Bloody Exorcism of Coffin Joe (1974)
  7. The Strange Hostel of Naked Pleasures (1976)
  8. Hellish Flesh (1977)
  9. Hallucinations of a Deranged Mind (1978)
  10. Perversion (1979)
  11. Embodiment of Evil (2008) (a.k.a. Encarnação do Demônio)
- The Crime Club
  1. The Westland Case (1937)
  2. The Black Doll (1938)
  3. The Lady in the Morgue (1938)
  4. Danger on the Air (1938)
  5. The Last Express (1938)
  6. Gambling Ship (1938)
  7. The Last Warning (1938)
  8. Mystery of the White Room (1939)
  9. Inside Information (1939)
  10. The House of Fear (1939)
  11. The Witness Vanishes (1939)

=== D ===
- Digimon ***** (A)
  1. Digimon: The Movie (2000)
  2. Digimon Tamers: Battle of Adventurers (2001)
  3. Digital Monster X-Evolution (2005) (TV)
  4. Digimon Adventure tri.: Reunion (2015)
  5. Digimon Adventure tri.: Determination (2016)
  6. Digimon Adventure tri.: Confession (2017)
  7. Digimon Adventure tri.: Loss (2018)
  8. Digimon Adventure tri.: Coexistence (2018)
  9. Digimon Adventure tri.: Future (2018)
  10. Digimon Adventure: Last Evolution Kizuna (2020)
  11. Digimon Adventure 02: The Beginning (2023)

=== F ===
- Fast & Furious *
  1. The Fast and the Furious (2001)
  2. 2 Fast 2 Furious (2003)
  3. The Fast and the Furious: Tokyo Drift (2006)
  4. Fast & Furious (2009)
  5. Fast Five (2011)
  6. Fast & Furious 6 (2013)
  7. Furious 7 (2015)
  8. The Fate of the Furious (2017)
  9. Hobbs & Shaw (2019) (spin-off)
  10. F9 (2021)
  11. Fast X (2023)

=== G ===
- Gingerdead Man vs. Evil Bong
  1. The Gingerdead Man (2005)
  2. Evil Bong (2006)
  3. Gingerdead Man 2: Passion of the Crust (2008) (V)
  4. Evil Bong 2: King Bong (2009)
  5. Evil Bong 3D: The Wrath of Bong (2011)
  6. Gingerdead Man 3: Saturday Night Cleaver (2011) (V)
  7. Gingerdead Man vs. Evil Bong (2013)
  8. Evil Bong 420 (2015)
  9. Evil Bong High-5! (2016)
  10. Evil Bong 666 (2017)
  11. Evil Bong 777 (2018)

=== H ===
- Hellraiser
  1. Hellraiser (1987)
  2. Hellbound: Hellraiser II (1988)
  3. Hellraiser III: Hell on Earth (1992)
  4. Hellraiser: Bloodline (1996)
  5. Hellraiser: Inferno (2000) (V)
  6. Hellraiser: Hellseeker (2002) (V)
  7. Hellraiser: Deader (2005) (V)
  8. Hellraiser: Hellworld (2005) (V)
  9. Hellraiser: Revelations (2011) (V)
  10. Hellraiser: Judgment (2018) (V)
  11. Hellraiser (2022) (reboot)

=== L ===
- Night of the Living Dead
  1. Night of the Living Dead (1968)
  2. Dawn of the Dead (1978)
  3. Day of the Dead (1985)
  4. Night of the Living Dead (1990) (remake)
  5. Dawn of the Dead (2004) (remake)
  6. Land of the Dead (2005)
  7. Diary of the Dead (2007) (reboot)
  8. Day of the Dead (2008) (V) (remake)
  9. Survival of the Dead (2009) (reboot)
  10. Day of the Dead: Bloodline (2017) (remake)
  11. Twilight of the Dead (2027)
- Love Comes Softly
  1. Love Comes Softly (2003) (TV)
  2. Love's Enduring Promise (2004) (TV)
  3. Love's Long Journey (2005) (TV)
  4. Love's Abiding Joy (2006) (TV)
  5. Love's Unending Legacy (2007) (TV)
  6. Love's Unfolding Dream (2008) (TV)
  7. Love Takes Wing (2009) (TV)
  8. Love Finds a Home (2009) (TV)
  9. Love Begins (2011) (TV) (prequel)
  10. Love's Everlasting Courage (2011) (TV) (prequel)
  11. Love's Christmas Journey (2011) (TV)

=== M ===
- Mickey Mouse ****
  1. Fantasia (1940)
  2. Fun and Fancy Free (1947)
  3. The Mickey Mouse Anniversary Show (1968) (TV)
  4. Mickey Mouse Jubliee Show (1978)
  5. The Spirit of Mickey (1998) (V)
  6. Mickey's Once Upon a Christmas (1999) (V)
  7. Fantasia 2000 (1999)
  8. Mickey's Magical Christmas: Snowed in at the House of Mouse (2001) (V)
  9. Mickey's House of Villains (2002) (V)
  10. Mickey, Donald, Goofy: The Three Musketeers (2004) (V)
  11. Mickey's Twice Upon a Christmas (2004) (V)
- Madame Aema
  1. Aema buin (1982)
  2. Madame Aema 2 (1984)
  3. Madame Aema 3 (1985)
  4. Madame Aema 4 (1990)
  5. Madame Aema 5 (1991)
  6. Madame Aema 6 (1992)
  7. Madame Aema 7 (1992)
  8. Madame Aema 8 (1993)
  9. Madame Aema 9 (1993)
  10. Madame Aema 10 (1994)
  11. Madame Aema 11 (1995)
- Mystery Woman
  1. Mystery Woman (2003) (TV)
  2. Mystery Woman: Mystery Weekend (2005) (TV)
  3. Mystery Woman: Snapshot (2005) (TV)
  4. Mystery Woman: Sing Me a Murder (2005) (TV)
  5. Mystery Woman: Vision of a Murder (2005) (TV)
  6. Mystery Woman: Game Time (2005) (TV)
  7. Mystery Woman: At First Sight (2006) (TV)
  8. Mystery Woman: Wild West Mystery (2006) (TV)
  9. Mystery Woman: Oh Baby (2006) (TV)
  10. Mystery Woman: Redemption (2006) (TV)
  11. Mystery Woman: In the Shadows (2007) (TV)

=== N ===
- Naruto the Movie (A) **
  1. Naruto the Movie: Ninja Clash in the Land of Snow (2004)
  2. Naruto the Movie: Legend of the Stone of Gelel (2005)
  3. Naruto the Movie: Guardians of the Crescent Moon Kingdom (2006)
  4. Naruto Shippuden the Movie (2007)
  5. Naruto Shippuden the Movie: Bonds (2008)
  6. Naruto Shippuden the Movie: The Will of Fire (2009)
  7. Naruto Shippuden the Movie: The Lost Tower (2010)
  8. Naruto the Movie: Blood Prison (2011)
  9. Road to Ninja: Naruto the Movie (2012)
  10. The Last: Naruto the Movie (2014)
  11. Boruto: Naruto the Movie (2015)

=== P ===
- The Pink Panther ***
  1. The Pink Panther (1963)
  2. A Shot in the Dark (1964)
  3. Inspector Clouseau (1968)
  4. The Return of the Pink Panther (1975)
  5. The Pink Panther Strikes Again (1976)
  6. Revenge of the Pink Panther (1978)
  7. Trail of the Pink Panther (1982)
  8. Curse of the Pink Panther (1983)
  9. Son of the Pink Panther (1993)
  10. The Pink Panther (2006) (reboot)
  11. The Pink Panther 2 (2009) (reboot)

=== S ===
- Squadra antiscippo
  1. Squadra antiscippo (1976)
  2. Squadra antifurto (1976)
  3. Squadra antitruffa (1977)
  4. Squadra antimafia (1978)
  5. Assassinio sul Tevere (1979)
  6. Squadra antigangsters (1979)
  7. Delitto a Porta Romana (1980)
  8. Delitto al ristorante cinese (1981)
  9. Delitto sull'autostrada (1982)
  10. Delitto in Formula Uno (1984)
  11. Delitto al Blue Gay (1984)

=== T ===
- Teenage Mutant Ninja Turtles (a) *
  1. Teenage Mutant Ninja Turtles (1990)
  2. Teenage Mutant Ninja Turtles II: The Secret of the Ooze (1991)
  3. Teenage Mutant Ninja Turtles III (1993)
  4. TMNT (2007) (A)
  5. Turtles Forever (2009) (A) (TV)
  6. Teenage Mutant Ninja Turtles (2014) (reboot)
  7. Teenage Mutant Ninja Turtles: Out of the Shadows (2016) (reboot)
  8. Batman vs. Teenage Mutant Ninja Turtles (2019) (A) (V)
  9. Rise of the Teenage Mutant Ninja Turtles: The Movie (2022) (A)
  10. Teenage Mutant Ninja Turtles: Mutant Mayhem (2023) (A)
  11. Untitled Teenage Mutant Ninja Turtles: Mutant Mayhem sequel (2027) (A)

=== W ===
- Wizarding World
  1. Harry Potter and the Philosopher's Stone (2001)
  2. Harry Potter and the Chamber of Secrets (2002)
  3. Harry Potter and the Prisoner of Azkaban (2004)
  4. Harry Potter and the Goblet of Fire (2005)
  5. Harry Potter and the Order of the Phoenix (2007)
  6. Harry Potter and the Half-Blood Prince (2009)
  7. Harry Potter and the Deathly Hallows – Part 1 (2010)
  8. Harry Potter and the Deathly Hallows – Part 2 (2011)
  9. Fantastic Beasts and Where to Find Them (2016) (spin-off)
  10. Fantastic Beasts: The Crimes of Grindelwald (2018) (spin-off)
  11. Fantastic Beasts: The Secrets of Dumbledore (2022) (spin-off)

=== Y ===
- Young and Dangerous
  1. Goo wak chai: Yan joi gong woo (1996)
  2. Young and Dangerous 2 (1996)
  3. Young and Dangerous 3 (1996)
  4. Once Upon a Time in Triad Society (1996) (spin-off)
  5. Young and Dangerous 4 (1997)
  6. Young and Dangerous 5 (1998)
  7. Portland Street Blues (1998) (spin-off)
  8. Young and Dangerous: The Prequel (1998) (prequel)
  9. The Legendary Tai Fei (1999) (spin-off)
  10. Those Were the Days (2000) (spin-off)
  11. Young and Dangerous 6: Born to Be King (2000)

== 12 ==
=== A ===
- Anaconda vs. Lake Placid
  1. Anaconda (1997)
  2. Lake Placid (1999)
  3. Anacondas: The Hunt for the Blood Orchid (2004)
  4. Lake Placid 2 (2007) (TV)
  5. Anaconda 3: Offspring (2008) (TV)
  6. Anacondas: Trail of Blood (2009) (TV)
  7. Lake Placid 3 (2010) (TV)
  8. Lake Placid: The Final Chapter (2012) (TV)
  9. Lake Placid vs. Anaconda (2015) (TV) (crossover)
  10. Lake Placid: Legacy (2018) (TV) (retcon)
  11. Anaconda (2024) (remake)
  12. Anaconda (2025) (reboot)
- Aurora Teagarden Mystery
  1. A Bone to Pick (2015) (TV)
  2. Real Murders (2015) (TV)
  3. Three Bedrooms, One Corpse (2016) (TV)
  4. The Julius House (2016) (TV)
  5. Dead Over Heels (2017) (TV)
  6. A Bundle of Trouble (2017) (TV)
  7. Last Scene Alive (2018) (TV)
  8. Reap What You Sew (2018) (TV)
  9. The Disappearing Game (2018) (TV)
  10. A Game of Cat and Mouse (2019) (TV)
  11. An Inheritance to Die For (2019) (TV)
  12. A Very Foul Play (2019) (TV)

=== B ===
- Bomba, the Jungle Boy
  1. Bomba, the Jungle Boy (1949)
  2. Bomba on Panther Island (1949)
  3. The Lost Volcano (1950)
  4. Bomba and the Hidden City (1950)
  5. The Lion Hunters (1951)
  6. Elephant Stampede (1951)
  7. African Treasure (1952)
  8. Bomba and the Jungle Girl (1952)
  9. Safari Drums (1953)
  10. The Golden Idol (1954)
  11. Killer Leopard (1954)
  12. Lord of the Jungle (1955)

=== F ===
- The Flintstones (a) *************
  1. The Man Called Flintstone (1966) (A)
  2. A Flintstone Christmas (1977) (A) (TV)
  3. The Flintstones: Little Big League (1978) (A) (TV)
  4. The Flintstones Meet Rockula and Frankenstone (1979) (A) (TV)
  5. The Jetsons Meet the Flintstones (1987) (A) (TV)
  6. I Yabba-Dabba Do! (1993) (A) (TV)
  7. Hollyrock-a-Bye Baby (1993) (A) (TV)
  8. The Flintstones (1994)
  9. A Flintstones Christmas Carol (1994) (A) (TV)
  10. The Flintstones in Viva Rock Vegas (2000)
  11. The Flintstones: On the Rocks (2001) (A) (TV)
  12. The Flintstones & WWE: Stone Age SmackDown! (2015) (A) (V)

=== G ===
- Gamera
  1. Gamera, the Giant Monster (1965)
  2. Gamera vs. Barugon (1966)
  3. Gamera vs. Gyaos (1967)
  4. Gamera vs. Viras (1968)
  5. Gamera vs. Guiron (1969)
  6. Gamera vs. Jiger (1970)
  7. Gamera vs. Zigra (1971)
  8. Gamera: Super Monster (1980)
  9. Gamera: Guardian of the Universe (1995)
  10. Gamera 2: Advent of Legion (1996)
  11. Gamera 3: Awakening of Irys (1999)
  12. Gamera the Brave (2006)

=== H ===
- Hulk (a) ********
  1. The Incredible Hulk (1977) (TV)
  2. The Return of the Incredible Hulk (1977) (TV)
  3. Bride of the Incredible Hulk (1978) (TV)
  4. The Incredible Hulk Returns (1988) (TV)
  5. The Trial of the Incredible Hulk (1989) (TV)
  6. The Death of the Incredible Hulk (1990) (TV)
  7. Hulk (2003)
  8. The Incredible Hulk (2008) (reboot)
  9. Hulk Vs. (2009) (A) (V)
  10. Planet Hulk (2010) (A) (V)
  11. Iron Man and Hulk: Heroes United (2013) (A) (V)
  12. Hulk: Where Monsters Dwell (2016) (A) (V)
- The Hombre Lobo Series (a.k.a. The Waldemar Daninsky Series)
  1. La Marca del Hombre Lobo (Mark of the Wolf Man) (1968)
  2. Las Noches del Hombre Lobo (The Nights of the Wolf Man) (1968)
  3. Los Monstruos del Terror (The Monsters of Terror) (1969)
  4. La Furia del Hombre Lobo (Fury of the Wolf Man) (1970)
  5. La Noche de Walpurgis (Walpurgis Night) (1970)
  6. Dr. Jekyll y el Hombre Lobo (Dr. Jekyll and the Wolf Man) (1971)
  7. El Retorno de Walpurgis (The Return of Walpurgis) (1972) (a.k.a. Curse of the Devil)
  8. La Maldicion de la Bestia (Curse of the Beast) (1975)
  9. El Retorno del Hombre Lobo (Return of the Wolf Man) (1980)
  10. La Bestia y la Espada Magica (The Beast and the Magic Sword) (1983)
  11. Licántropo (Lycantropus: The Moonlight Murders) (1996) (a.k.a. The Full Moon Killer)
  12. Tomb of the Werewolf (2004)

=== J ===
- Joe Palooka *
  1. Palooka (1934)
  2. Joe Palooka, Champ (1946)
  3. Gentleman Joe Palooka (1946)
  4. Joe Palooka in the Knockout (1947)
  5. Joe Palooka in Fighting Mad (1948)
  6. Joe Palooka in Winner Take All (1948)
  7. Joe Palooka in the Big Fight (1949)
  8. Joe Palooka in the Counterpunch (1949)
  9. Joe Palooka Meets Humphrey (1950)
  10. Joe Palooka in Humphrey Takes a Chance (1950)
  11. Joe Palooka in the Squared Circle (1950)
  12. Joe Palooka in Triple Cross (1951)
- L.E.T.H.A.L. Ladies (a.k.a. Triple-B, Bullets, Bombs and Babes)
  1. Malibu Express (1985)
  2. Hard Ticket to Hawaii (1987) (a.k.a. Piège Mortel à Hawaï)
  3. Picasso Trigger (1988)
  4. Savage Beach (1989)
  5. Guns (1990)
  6. Do or Die (1991) (a.k.a. Girls, Games & Guns)
  7. Hard Hunted (1992)
  8. Fit to Kill (1993)
  9. Enemy Gold (1993)
  10. The Dallas Connection (1994)
  11. Day of the Warrior (1996)
  12. L.E.T.H.A.L. Ladies: Return to Savage Beach (1998)

=== M ===
- The Muppets ******
  1. The Muppet Movie (1979)
  2. The Great Muppet Caper (1981)
  3. The Muppets Take Manhattan (1984)
  4. The Muppet Christmas Carol (1992)
  5. Muppet Classic Theater (1994) (V)
  6. Muppet Treasure Island (1996)
  7. Muppets from Space (1999)
  8. Kermit's Swamp Years (2002) (V)
  9. It's a Very Merry Muppet Christmas Movie (2002) (TV)
  10. The Muppets' Wizard of Oz (2005) (TV)
  11. The Muppets (2011)
  12. Muppets Most Wanted (2014)
- Michael Shayne *
  1. Michael Shayne, Private Detective (1940)
  2. Sleepers West (1941)
  3. Dressed to Kill (1941)
  4. Blue, White and Perfect (1942)
  5. The Man Who Wouldn't Die (1942)
  6. Just Off Broadway (1942)
  7. Time to Kill (1942)
  8. Murder Is My Business (1946)
  9. Larceny in Her Heart (1946)
  10. Blonde for a Day (1946)
  11. Three on a Ticket (1947)
  12. Too Many Winners (1947)
- Nemuri Kyoshirō (Matsukata Hiroki series)
  1. Sleepy Eyes of Death 1: The Chinese Jade (1963)
  2. Sleepy Eyes of Death 2: Sword of Adventure (1964)
  3. Sleepy Eyes of Death 3: Full Circle Killing (1964)
  4. Sleepy Eyes of Death 4: Sword of Seduction (1964)
  5. Sleepy Eyes of Death 5: Sword of Fire (1965)
  6. Sleepy Eyes of Death 6: Sword of Satan (1965)
  7. Sleepy Eyes of Death 7: The Mask of the Princess (1966)
  8. Sleepy Eyes of Death 8: Sword of Villainy (1966)
  9. Sleepy Eyes of Death 9: A Trail of Traps (1967)
  10. Sleepy Eyes of Death 10: Hell Is a Woman (1968)
  11. Sleepy Eyes of Death 11: In the Spider's Lair (1968)
  12. Sleepy Eyes of Death 12: Castle Menagerie (1969)

=== S ===
- Sniper
  1. Sniper (1993)
  2. Sniper 2 (2002) (TV)
  3. Sniper 3 (2004) (V)
  4. Sniper: Reloaded (2011) (V)
  5. Sniper: Legacy (2014) (V)
  6. Sniper: Ghost Shooter (2016) (V)
  7. Sniper: Ultimate Kill (2017) (V)
  8. Sniper: Assassin's End (2020) (V)
  9. Sniper: Rogue Mission (2022) (V)
  10. Sniper: G.R.I.T. – Global Response & Intelligence Team (2023) (V)
  11. Sniper: The Last Stand (2025) (V)
  12. Sniper: No Nation (2026) (V)
- Signed, Sealed, Delivered *
  1. Second Chances (2013) (TV)
  2. Signed, Sealed, Delivered for Christmas (2014) (TV)
  3. From Paris with Love (2015) (TV)
  4. Truth Be Told (2015) (TV)
  5. The Impossible Dream (2015) (TV)
  6. From the Heart (2016) (TV)
  7. One in a Million (2016) (TV)
  8. Lost Without You (2016) (TV)
  9. Higher Ground (2017) (TV)
  10. Home Again (2017) (TV)
  11. The Road Less Travelled (2018) (TV)
  12. To the Altar (2018) (TV)
- The Swan Princess (A)
  1. The Swan Princess (1994)
  2. The Swan Princess: Escape from Castle Mountain (1997) (V)
  3. The Swan Princess III: The Mystery of the Enchanted Treasure (1998) (V)
  4. The Swan Princess: Christmas (2012) (V)
  5. The Swan Princess: A Royal Family Tale (2014) (V)
  6. The Swan Princess: Princess Tomorrow, Pirate Today! (2016) (V)
  7. The Swan Princess: Royally Undercover (2017) (V)
  8. The Swan Princess: A Royal Myztery (2018) (V)
  9. The Swan Princess: Kingdom of Music (2019) (V)
  10. The Swan Princess: A Royal Wedding (2020) (V)
  11. The Swan Princess: A Fairytale is Born (2023) (V)
  12. The Swan Princess: Far Longer than Forever (2023) (V)

=== V ===
- V/H/S *
  1. V/H/S (2012)
  2. V/H/S/2 (2013)
  3. V/H/S: Viral (2014)
  4. Siren (2016) (spin-off)
  5. V/H/S/94 (2021) (prequel)
  6. V/H/S/99 (2022) (prequel)
  7. Kids vs. Aliens (2022) (spin-off)
  8. V/H/S/85 (2023) (prequel)
  9. V/H/S/Beyond (2024)
  10. V/H/S/Halloween (2025)
  11. V/H/S/Mixtape (2026)
  12. V/H/S: SCP (2027)

=== W ===
- Wallace & Gromit
  1. A Grand Day Out (1989)
  2. The Wrong Trousers (1993)
  3. A Close Shave (1995)
  4. Wallace & Gromit: The Curse of the Were-Rabbit (2005)
  5. Wallace & Gromit: A Matter of Loaf and Death (2008)
  6. Jubilee Bunt-a-thon (2012)
  7. Shaun the Sheep Movie (2015) (spin-off)
  8. Shaun the Sheep: The Farmer's Llamas (2015) (spin-off)
  9. A Shaun the Sheep Movie: Farmageddon (2019) (spin-off)
  10. Shaun the Sheep: The Flight Before Christmas (2021) (spin-off)
  11. Wallace & Gromit: Vengeance Most Fowl (2024)
  12. Shaun the Sheep: The Beast of Mossy Bottom (2026) (spin-off)

== 13 ==
=== A ===
- American Girl
  1. Samantha: An American Girl Holiday (2004) (TV)
  2. Felicity: An American Girl Adventure (2005) (TV)
  3. Molly: An American Girl on the Home Front (2006) (TV)
  4. Kit Kittredge: An American Girl (2008)
  5. An American Girl: Chrissa Stands Strong (2009) (V)
  6. An American Girl: McKenna Shoots for the Stars (2012) (V)
  7. An American Girl: Saige Paints the Sky (2013) (V)
  8. An American Girl: Isabelle Dances Into the Spotlight (2014) (V)
  9. An American Girl: Grace Stirs Up Success (2015) (V)
  10. An American Girl: Lea to the Rescue (2016) (V)
  11. An American Girl Story – Melody 1963: Love Has to Win (2016) (V)
  12. An American Girl Story – Maryellen 1955: Extraordinary Christmas (2016) (V)
  13. An American Girl Story - Ivy & Julie 1976: A Happy Balance (2017) (V)

=== B ===
- Bratz (a) *
  1. Bratz: Starrin & Stylin' (2004) (V)
  2. Bratz Rock Angelz (2004) (V)
  3. Bratz Genie Magic (2005) (V)
  4. Bratz Babyz: The Movie (2005) (V)
  5. Bratz Forever Diamondz (2005) (V)
  6. Bratz Fashion Pixiez (2006) (V)
  7. Bratz Kidz: Sleep-Over Adventure (2006) (V)
  8. Bratz Super Babyz (2007) (V)
  9. Bratz: The Movie (2007) (live-action)
  10. Bratz Kidz Fairy Tales (2007) (V)
  11. Bratz Babyz Save Christmas (2007) (V)
  12. Bratz Girls Really Rock (2008) (V)
  13. Bratz Pampered Petz (2008) (V)

=== H ===
- Halloween
  1. Halloween (1978)
  2. Halloween II (1981)
  3. Halloween III: Season of the Witch (1982) (standalone film)
  4. Halloween 4: The Return of Michael Myers (1988)
  5. Halloween 5: The Revenge of Michael Myers (1989)
  6. Halloween: The Curse of Michael Myers (1995)
  7. Halloween H20: 20 Years Later (1998) (retcon)
  8. Halloween: Resurrection (2002) (retcon)
  9. Halloween (2007) (remake)
  10. Halloween II (2009) (remake)
  11. Halloween (2018) (retcon)
  12. Halloween Kills (2021) (retcon)
  13. Halloween Ends (2022) (retcon)

=== M ===
- Madea Simmons ***
  1. Diary of a Mad Black Woman (2005)
  2. Madea's Family Reunion (2006)
  3. Meet the Browns (2008)
  4. Madea Goes to Jail (2009)
  5. I Can Do Bad All By Myself (2009)
  6. Madea's Big Happy Family (2011)
  7. Madea's Witness Protection (2012)
  8. A Madea Christmas (2013)
  9. Madea's Tough Love (2015) (V) (a)
  10. Boo! A Madea Halloween (2016)
  11. Boo 2! A Madea Halloween (2017)
  12. A Madea Family Funeral (2019)
  13. A Madea Homecoming (2022)
- Mothra *
  1. Mothra (1961)
  2. Mothra vs. Godzilla (1964)
  3. Ghidorah, the Three-Headed Monster (1964)
  4. Ebirah, Horror of the Deep (1966)
  5. Destroy All Monsters (1968)
  6. Godzilla vs. Mothra (1992)
  7. Godzilla vs. SpaceGodzilla (1994)
  8. Rebirth of Mothra (1996)
  9. Rebirth of Mothra II (1997)
  10. Rebirth of Mothra III (1998)
  11. Godzilla, Mothra & King Ghidorah: Giant Monsters All-Out Attack (2001)
  12. Godzilla: Tokyo S.O.S. (2003)
  13. Godzilla: Final Wars (2004)

=== P ===
- Pekka and Pätkä
  1. Pekka Puupää (1953)
  2. Pekka Puupää kesälaitumilla (1953)
  3. Pekka ja Pätkä lumimiehen jäljillä (1954)
  4. Pekka ja Pätkä puistotäteinä (1955)
  5. Kiinni on ja pysyy (1955)
  6. Pekka ja Pätkä pahassa pulassa (1955)
  7. Pekka ja Pätkä ketjukolarissa (1957)
  8. Pekka ja Pätkä salapoliiseina (1957)
  9. Pekka ja Pätkä sammakkomiehinä (1957)
  10. Pekka ja Pätkä Suezilla (1958)
  11. Pekka ja Pätkä miljonääreinä (1958)
  12. Pekka ja Pätkä mestarimaalareina (1959)
  13. Pekka ja Pätkä neekereinä (1960)

=== R ===
- Resident Evil (a) **
  1. Biohazard 4D-Executer (2000) (A)
  2. Resident Evil (2002)
  3. Resident Evil: Apocalypse (2004)
  4. Resident Evil: Extinction (2007)
  5. Resident Evil: Degeneration (2008) (A)
  6. Resident Evil: Afterlife (2010)
  7. Resident Evil: Retribution (2012)
  8. Resident Evil: Damnation (2012) (A)
  9. Resident Evil: The Final Chapter (2016)
  10. Resident Evil: Vendetta (2017) (A)
  11. Resident Evil: Welcome to Raccoon City (2021) (reboot)
  12. Resident Evil: Death Island (2023) (A)
  13. Resident Evil (2026) (reboot)

=== S ===
- Schulmädchen-Report
  1. Schulmädchen-Report: Was Eltern nicht für möglich halten (1970)
  2. Schulmädchen-Report 2: Was Eltern den Schlaf raubt (1971)
  3. Schulmädchen-Report 3. Teil - Was Eltern nicht mal ahnen (1972)
  4. Schulmädchen-Report 4. Teil - Was Eltern oft verzweifeln lässt (1972)
  5. Schulmädchen-Report 5. Teil - Was Eltern wirklich wissen sollten (1973)
  6. Schulmädchen-Report 6: Was Eltern gern vertuschen möchten (1973)
  7. Schulmädchen-Report 7: Doch das Herz muß dabei sein (1974)
  8. Schulmädchen-Report 8: Was Eltern nie erfahren dürfen (1974)
  9. Schulmädchen-Report 9: Reifeprüfung vor dem Abitur (1975)
  10. Schulmädchen-Report 10: Irgendwann fängt jede an (1976)
  11. Schulmädchen-Report 11. Teil - Probieren geht über Studieren (1977)
  12. Schulmädchen-Report 12. Teil - Wenn das die Mammi wüßte (1978)
  13. Vergiss beim Sex die Liebe nicht - Der neue Schulmächenreport 13. Teil (1980)

=== W ===
- Wangan Middonaito *
  1. Wangan Midnight (1991)
  2. Wangan Midnight II (1993)
  3. Wangan Midnight III (1993)
  4. Wangan Midnight 4 (1993)
  5. Wangan Midnight Special Director's Cut Complete Edition (1994)
  6. Wangan Midnight Final: GT-R Legend - Act 1 (1994)
  7. Wangan Midnight Final: GT-R Legend - Act 2 (1994)
  8. Devil GT-R Full Tuning (1994)
  9. Showdown! Devil GT-R (1994)
  10. Wangan Midnight S30 vs. Gold GT-R - Part I (1998)
  11. Wangan Midnight S30 vs. Gold GT-R - Part II (1998)
  12. Wangan Midnight Return (2001)
  13. Wangan Midnight: The Movie (2009)
- Wild Bill Hickok
  1. The Great Adventures of Wild Bill Hickok (1938) (Serial)
  2. Prairie Schooners (1940)
  3. Beyond the Sacramento (1940)
  4. The Wildcat of Tucson (1940)
  5. Across the Sierras (1941)
  6. North from the Lone Star (1941)
  7. Hands Across the Rockies (1941)
  8. King of Dodge City (1941)
  9. Roaring Frontiers (1941)
  10. The Lone Star Vigilantes (1942)
  11. Bullets for Bandits (1942)
  12. The Devil's Trail (1942)
  13. Prairie Gunsmoke (1942)

== 14 ==
=== A ===
- Air Bud
  1. Air Bud (1997)
  2. Air Bud: Golden Receiver (1998)
  3. Air Bud: World Pup (2000)
  4. Air Bud: Seventh Inning Fetch (2002) (V)
  5. Air Bud: Spikes Back (2003) (V)
  6. Air Buddies (2006) (V)
  7. Snow Buddies (2008) (V)
  8. Space Buddies (2009) (V)
  9. Santa Buddies (2009) (V)
  10. The Search for Santa Paws (2010) (V) (Note: Prequel/spin-off of Santa Buddies (2009).)
  11. Spooky Buddies (2011) (V)
  12. Treasure Buddies (2012) (V)
  13. Santa Paws 2: The Santa Pups (2012) (V)
  14. Super Buddies (2013) (V)
- American Film Theatre
  1. The Man in the Glass Booth (1975)
  2. In Celebration (1975)
  3. Galileo (1975)
  4. Jacques Brel Is Alive and Well and Living in Paris (1975)
  5. Philadelphia, Here I Come (1975)
  6. Lost in the Stars (1974)
  7. Rhinoceros (1974)
  8. Butley (1974)
  9. The Maids (1974)
  10. A Delicate Balance (1973)
  11. The Homecoming (1973)
  12. The Iceman Cometh (1973)
  13. Luther (1973)
  14. Three Sisters (1970)

=== B ===
- Boston Blackie, portrayed by Chester Morris
  1. Meet Boston Blackie (1941)
  2. Confessions of Boston Blackie (1941)
  3. Alias Boston Blackie (1942)
  4. Boston Blackie Goes Hollywood (1942)
  5. After Midnight with Boston Blackie (1943)
  6. The Chance of a Lifetime (1943)
  7. One Mysterious Night (1944)
  8. Boston Blackie Booked on Suspicion (1945)
  9. Boston Blackie's Rendezvous (1945)
  10. A Close Call for Boston Blackie (1946)
  11. The Phantom Thief (1946)
  12. Boston Blackie and the Law (1946)
  13. Trapped by Boston Blackie (1948)
  14. Boston Blackie's Chinese Venture (1949)

=== D ===
- Darna ***
  1. Darna (1951)
  2. Darna at ang Babaeng Lawin (1952)
  3. Si Darna at ang Impakta (1963)
  4. Isputnik vs. Darna (1963)
  5. Darna at ang Babaing Tuod (1964)
  6. Si Darna at ang Planetman (1969)
  7. Lipad, Darna, Lipad! (1973)
  8. Darna and the Giants (1974)
  9. Darna vs. the Planet Women (1975)
  10. Darna, Kuno? (1979)
  11. Bira! Darna! Bira! (1979)
  12. Darna at Ding (1980)
  13. Darna (1991)
  14. Mars Ravelo's Darna! Ang Pagbabalik (1994)

=== F ===
- FIFA World Cup
  1. German Giants (1954)
  2. Hinein! (1958)
  3. Viva Brazil (1962)
  4. Goal! (1966)
  5. The World at Their Feet (1970)
  6. Heading for Glory (1974)
  7. Campeones (1978)
  8. G'olé! (1982)
  9. Hero (1987)
  10. Soccer Shoot-Out (1990)
  11. Two Billion Hearts (1994)
  12. La Coupe de la Gloire (1998)
  13. Seven Games from Glory (2002)
  14. The Grand Finale (2006) (V)

=== K ===
- King Kong (a) *****
  1. King Kong (1933)
  2. Son of Kong (1933)
  3. King Kong vs. Godzilla (1962) (crossover)
  4. King Kong Escapes (1967) (standalone film)
  5. King Kong (1976) (remake)
  6. King Kong Lives (1986) (remake)
  7. The Mighty Kong (1998) (A) (V)
  8. Kong: King of Atlantis (2005) (A) (V)
  9. King Kong (2005) (remake)
  10. Kong: Return to the Jungle (2006) (A) (V)
  11. Kong: Skull Island (2017) (reboot)
  12. Godzilla vs. Kong (2021) (crossover)
  13. Godzilla x Kong: The New Empire (2024) (crossover)
  14. Godzilla x Kong: Supernova (2027) (crossover)

=== L ===
- The Land Before Time * (A)
  1. The Land Before Time (1988)
  2. The Land Before Time II: The Great Valley Adventure (1994) (V)
  3. The Land Before Time III: The Time of the Great Giving (1995) (V)
  4. The Land Before Time IV: Journey Through the Mists (1996) (V)
  5. The Land Before Time V: The Mysterious Island (1997) (V)
  6. The Land Before Time VI: The Secret of Saurus Rock (1998) (V)
  7. The Land Before Time VII: The Stone of Cold Fire (2000) (V)
  8. The Land Before Time VIII: The Big Freeze (2001) (V)
  9. The Land Before Time IX: Journey to Big Water (2002) (V)
  10. The Land Before Time X: The Great Longneck Migration (2003) (V)
  11. The Land Before Time XI: Invasion of the Tinysauruses (2005) (V)
  12. The Land Before Time XII: The Great Day of the Flyers (2007) (TV)
  13. The Land Before Time XIII: The Wisdom of Friends (2007) (V)
  14. The Land Before Time XIV: Journey of the Brave (2016) (V)

=== O ===
- Olsen-banden (Danish series)
  1. Olsen-banden (1968)
  2. Olsen-banden på spanden (1969)
  3. Olsen-banden i Jylland (1971)
  4. Olsen-bandens store kup (1972)
  5. Olsen-banden går amok (1973)
  6. Olsen-bandens sidste bedrifter (1974)
  7. Olsen-banden på sporet (1975)
  8. Olsen-banden ser rødt (1976)
  9. Olsen-banden deruda' (1977)
  10. Olsen-banden går i krig (1978)
  11. Olsen-banden overgiver sig aldrig (1979)
  12. Olsen-bandens flugt over plankeværket (1981)
  13. Olsen-banden over alle bjerge (1981)
  14. Olsen-bandens sidste stik (1998)
- Olsenbanden (Norwegian series)
  1. Olsenbanden Operasjon Egon (1969)
  2. Olsenbanden og Dynamitt-Harry (1970)
  3. Olsenbanden tar gull (1972)
  4. Olsenbanden og Dynamitt-Harry går amok (1973)
  5. Olsenbanden møter Kongen og Knekten (1974)
  6. Olsenbandens siste bedrifter (1975)
  7. Olsenbanden for full musikk (1976)
  8. Olsenbanden og Dynamitt-Harry på sporet (1977)
  9. Olsenbanden og Data-Harry sprenger verdensbanken (1978)
  10. Olsenbanden mot nye høyder (1979)
  11. Olsenbanden gir seg aldri (1981)
  12. Olsenbandens aller siste kupp (1982)
  13. …men Olsenbanden var ikke død (1984)
  14. Olsenbandens siste stikk (1999)
- One Piece *
  1. One Piece (2000)
  2. Clockwork Island Adventure (2001)
  3. Chopper's Kingdom on the Island of Strange Animals (2002)
  4. Dead End Adventure (2003)
  5. The Cursed Holy Sword (2004)
  6. Baron Omatsuri and the Secret Island (2005)
  7. Giant Mecha Soldier of Karakuri Castle (2006)
  8. The Desert Princess and the Pirates: Adventures in Alabasta (2007)
  9. Episode of Chopper Plus: Bloom in the Winter, Miracle Cherry Blossom (2008)
  10. Strong World (2009)
  11. Z (2012)
  12. Gold (2016)
  13. Stampede (2019)
  14. Red (2022)

=== S ===
- Star Trek **************
  1. Star Trek: The Motion Picture (1979)
  2. Star Trek II: The Wrath of Khan (1982)
  3. Star Trek III: The Search for Spock (1984)
  4. Star Trek IV: The Voyage Home (1986)
  5. Star Trek V: The Final Frontier (1989)
  6. Star Trek VI: The Undiscovered Country (1991)
  7. Star Trek Generations (1994)
  8. Star Trek: First Contact (1996)
  9. Star Trek: Insurrection (1998)
  10. Star Trek: Nemesis (2002)
  11. Star Trek (2009) (reboot)
  12. Star Trek Into Darkness (2013) (reboot)
  13. Star Trek Beyond (2016) (reboot)
  14. Star Trek: Section 31 (2025) (TV) (spin-off)
- Sherlock Holmes (1939 film series)
  1. The Hound of the Baskervilles (1939)
  2. The Adventures of Sherlock Holmes (1939)
  3. Sherlock Holmes and the Voice of Terror (1942)
  4. Sherlock Holmes and the Secret Weapon (1943)
  5. Sherlock Holmes in Washington (1943)
  6. Sherlock Holmes Faces Death (1943)
  7. The Spider Woman (1944)
  8. The Scarlet Claw (1944)
  9. The Pearl of Death (1944)
  10. The House of Fear (1945)
  11. The Woman in Green (1945)
  12. Pursuit to Algiers (1945)
  13. Terror by Night (1946)
  14. Dressed to Kill (1946)

== 15 ==
=== A ===
- Asterix (a)
  1. Asterix the Gaul (1967) (A)
  2. Asterix and Cleopatra (1968) (A)
  3. The Twelve Tasks of Asterix (1976) (A)
  4. Asterix Versus Caesar (1985) (A)
  5. Asterix in Britain (1986) (A)
  6. Asterix and the Big Fight (1989) (A)
  7. Asterix Conquers America (1994) (A)
  8. Asterix and Obelix vs. Caesar (1999)
  9. Asterix & Obelix: Mission Cleopatra (2002)
  10. Asterix and the Vikings (2006) (A)
  11. Astérix at the Olympic Games (2008)
  12. Asterix and Obelix: God Save Britannia (2012)
  13. Asterix: The Mansions of the Gods (2014) (A)
  14. Asterix: The Secret of the Magic Potion (2018) (A)
  15. Asterix & Obelix: The Middle Kingdom (2023)

=== P ===
- Philo Vance
  1. The Canary Murder Case (1929)
  2. The Greene Murder Case (1929)
  3. The Benson Murder Case (1930)
  4. The Bishop Murder Case (1930)
  5. The Kennel Murder Case (1933)
  6. The Dragon Murder Case (1934)
  7. The Casino Murder Case (1935)
  8. The Garden Murder Case (1936)
  9. The Scarab Murder Case (1936)
  10. Night of Mystery (1937)
  11. The Gracie Allen Murder Case (1939)
  12. Calling Philo Vance (1940)
  13. Philo Vance Returns (1947)
  14. Philo Vance's Gamble (1947)
  15. Philo Vance's Secret Mission (1947)

=== X ===
- X-Men **
  1. Generation X (1996) (TV) (spin-off)
  2. X-Men (2000)
  3. X2 (2003)
  4. X-Men: The Last Stand (2006)
  5. X-Men Origins: Wolverine (2009) (spin-off)
  6. X-Men: First Class (2011) (prequel)
  7. The Wolverine (2013) (spin-off)
  8. X-Men: Days of Future Past (2014) (prequel)
  9. Deadpool (2016) (spin-off)
  10. X-Men: Apocalypse (2016) (prequel)
  11. Logan (2017) (spin-off)
  12. Deadpool 2 (2018) (spin-off)
  13. Dark Phoenix (2019) (prequel)
  14. The New Mutants (2020) (spin-off)
  15. Deadpool & Wolverine (2024) (spin-off)

=== S ===
- Shake, Rattle & Roll
  1. Shake, Rattle & Roll (1984)
  2. Shake, Rattle & Roll II (1990)
  3. Shake, Rattle & Roll III (1991)
  4. Shake, Rattle & Roll IV (1992)
  5. Shake, Rattle & Roll V (1994)
  6. Shake, Rattle & Roll VI (1997)
  7. Shake, Rattle & Roll 2k5 (2005)
  8. Shake, Rattle and Roll 8 (2006)
  9. Shake, Rattle and Roll 9 (2007)
  10. Shake, Rattle & Roll X (2008)
  11. Shake, Rattle & Roll XI (2009)
  12. Shake, Rattle and Roll 12 (2010)
  13. Shake, Rattle & Roll 13 (2011)
  14. Shake, Rattle and Roll Fourteen: The Invasion (2012)
  15. Shake, Rattle & Roll XV (2014)
  16. Shake, Rattle & Roll Extreme (2023)
  17. Shake, Rattle & Roll Evil Origins (2025)

=== T ===
- Thomas & Friends ***
  1. Thomas and the Magic Railroad (2000)
  2. Calling All Engines! (2005) (V)
  3. The Great Discovery (2008)
  4. Hero of the Rails (2009)
  5. Misty Island Rescue (2010)
  6. Day of the Diesels (2011)
  7. Blue Mountain Mystery (2012)
  8. King of the Railway (2013)
  9. Tale of the Brave (2014)
  10. The Adventure Begins (2015) (V)
  11. Sodor's Legend of the Lost Treasure (2015)
  12. The Great Race (2016)
  13. Journey Beyond Sodor (2017)
  14. Big World! Big Adventures! (2018)
  15. Race for the Sodor Cup (2021) (TV)

=== W ===
- Winnie the Pooh (a) ****
  1. The Many Adventures of Winnie the Pooh (1977)
  2. Pooh's Grand Adventure: The Search for Christopher Robin (1997) (V)
  3. Winnie the Pooh: Seasons of Giving (1999) (V)
  4. The Tigger Movie (2000)
  5. The Book of Pooh: Stories from the Heart (2001) (V)
  6. Winnie the Pooh: A Very Merry Pooh Year (2002) (V)
  7. Piglet's Big Movie (2003)
  8. Winnie the Pooh: Springtime with Roo (2004) (V)
  9. Pooh's Heffalump Movie (2005)
  10. Pooh's Heffalump Halloween Movie (2005) (V)
  11. Super Sleuth Christmas Movie (2007) (V)
  12. Tigger & Pooh and a Musical Too (2009) (V)
  13. My Friends Tigger & Pooh: Super Duper Super Sleuths (2010) (V)
  14. Winnie the Pooh (2011)
  15. Christopher Robin (2018)

=== Z ===
- Zorro
  1. The Mark of Zorro (1920)
  2. Don Q, Son of Zorro (1925)
  3. The Bold Caballero (1936)
  4. Zorro Rides Again (1937)
  5. Zorro's Fighting Legion (1939)
  6. The Mark of Zorro (1940)
  7. Zorro's Black Whip (1944)
  8. Son of Zorro (1947)
  9. Ghost of Zorro (1949)
  10. Zorro the Avenger (1962)
  11. The Erotic Adventures of Zorro (1972)
  12. The Mark of Zorro (1974)
  13. Zorro, The Gay Blade (1981)
  14. The Mask of Zorro (1998)
  15. The Legend of Zorro (2005)

== 16 ==
=== A ===
- AVP (a) **
  1. Alien (1979)
  2. Aliens (1986)
  3. Predator (1987)
  4. Predator 2 (1990)
  5. Alien 3 (1992)
  6. Alien Resurrection (1997)
  7. Alien vs. Predator (2004) (crossover)
  8. Aliens vs. Predator: Requiem (2007) (crossover)
  9. Predators (2010)
  10. Prometheus (2012) (prequel)
  11. Alien: Covenant (2017) (prequel)
  12. The Predator (2018)
  13. Prey (2022) (prequel)
  14. Alien: Romulus (2024)
  15. Predator: Killer of Killers (2025) (A)
  16. Predator: Badlands (2025)

=== B ===
- Batman
  1. Batman (1966) (standalone film)
  2. Batman (1989)
  3. Batman Returns (1992)
  4. Batman Forever (1995)
  5. Batman & Robin (1997)
  6. Catwoman (2004) (spin-off)
  7. Batman Begins (2005) (reboot)
  8. The Dark Knight (2008) (reboot)
  9. The Dark Knight Rises (2012) (reboot)
  10. Batman v Superman: Dawn of Justice (2016) (crossover)
  11. Joker (2019) (spin-off)
  12. The Batman (2022) (reboot)
  13. Batgirl (2022) (spin-off)
  14. Joker: Folie à Deux (2024) (spin-off)
  15. Clayface (2026) (spin-off)
  16. The Batman: Part II (2028) (reboot)

=== C ===
- Camp Blood
  1. Camp Blood (1999) (V)
  2. Camp Blood 2 (2000) (V)
  3. Within the Woods (2005) (V) (standalone film)
  4. Camp Blood First Slaughter (2014) (V)
  5. Camp Blood 4 (2016) (V)
  6. Camp Blood 5 (2016) (V)
  7. Camp Blood 666 (2016) (V)
  8. Camp Blood 7 (2017) (V)
  9. The Ghost of Camp Blood (2018) (V) (spin-off)
  10. Camp Blood 8: Revelations (2019) (V)
  11. Children of Camp Blood (2020) (V)
  12. Camp Blood 666 Part 2: Exorcism Of The Clown (2023) (V)
  13. Camp Blood X: Animated (2023) (V)
  14. Camp Blood Clown Shark (2024) (V)
  15. Camp Blood 9: Bride of Blood (2024) (V)
  16. Camp Blood Christmas (2025) (V)

=== D ===
- DC Extended Universe *
  1. Man of Steel (2013) (reboot)
  2. Batman v Superman: Dawn of Justice (2016) (crossover)
  3. Suicide Squad (2016)
  4. Wonder Woman (2017)
  5. Justice League (2017)
  6. Aquaman (2018)
  7. Shazam! (2019)
  8. Birds of Prey (2020) (spin-off)
  9. Wonder Woman 1984 (2020)
  10. The Suicide Squad (2021)
  11. Black Adam (2022) (spin-off)
  12. Batgirl (2022) (spin-off)
  13. Shazam! Fury of the Gods (2023)
  14. The Flash (2023)
  15. Blue Beetle (2023)
  16. Aquaman and the Lost Kingdom (2023)
- DC Animated Movie Universe (A)
  1. Justice League: The Flashpoint Paradox (2013) (V)
  2. Justice League: War (2014) (V)
  3. Son of Batman (2014) (V)
  4. Justice League: Throne of Atlantis (2015) (V)
  5. Batman vs. Robin (2015) (V)
  6. Batman: Bad Blood (2016) (V)
  7. Justice League vs. Teen Titans (2016) (V)
  8. Justice League Dark (2017) (V)
  9. Teen Titans: The Judas Contract (2017) (V)
  10. Suicide Squad: Hell to Pay (2018) (V)
  11. The Death of Superman (2018) (V)
  12. Constantine: City of Demons (2018) (V)
  13. Reign of the Supermen (2019) (V)
  14. Hush (2019) (V)
  15. Wonder Woman: Bloodlines (2019) (V)
  16. Justice League Dark: Apokolips War (2020) (V)
- Dr. Kildare *
  1. Internes Can't Take Money (1937)
  2. Young Dr. Kildare (1938)
  3. Calling Dr. Kildare (1939)
  4. The Secret of Dr. Kildare (1939)
  5. Dr. Kildare's Strange Case (1940)
  6. Dr. Kildare Goes Home (1940)
  7. Dr. Kildare's Crisis (1940)
  8. The People vs. Dr. Kildare (1941)
  9. Dr. Kildare's Wedding Day (1941)
  10. Dr. Kildare's Victory (1942)
  11. Calling Dr. Gillespie (1942)
  12. Dr. Gillespie's New Assistant (1942)
  13. Dr. Gillespie's Criminal Case (1943)
  14. Three Men in White (1944)
  15. Between Two Women (1945)
  16. Dark Delusion (1947)

=== F ===
- The Falcon
  1. The Gay Falcon (1941)
  2. A Date with the Falcon (1941)
  3. The Falcon Takes Over (1942)
  4. The Falcon's Brother (1942)
  5. The Falcon Strikes Back (1943)
  6. The Falcon in Danger (1943)
  7. The Falcon and the Co-eds (1943)
  8. The Falcon Out West (1944)
  9. The Falcon in Mexico (1944)
  10. The Falcon in Hollywood (1944)
  11. The Falcon in San Francisco (1945)
  12. The Falcon's Alibi (1946)
  13. The Falcon's Adventure (1946)
  14. Devil's Cargo (1948)
  15. Appointment with Murder (1948)
  16. Search for Danger (1949)

=== G ===
- Garage Sale Mystery
  1. Garage Sale Mystery (2013) (TV)
  2. All that Glitters (2014) (TV)
  3. The Deadly Room (2015) (TV)
  4. The Wedding Dress (2015) (TV)
  5. Guilty Until Proven Innocent (2016) (TV)
  6. The Novel Murders (2016) (TV)
  7. The Art of Murder (2017) (TV)
  8. The Beach Murder (2017) (TV)
  9. Murder by Text (2017) (TV)
  10. Murder Most Medieval (2017) (TV)
  11. A Case of Murder (2017) (TV)
  12. The Pandora's Box Murders (2018) (TV)
  13. The Mask Murder (2018) (TV)
  14. Picture a Murder (2018) (TV)
  15. Murder in D Minor (2018) (TV)
  16. Search & Seized (2019) (TV)
  - Three Little Murders (2019) (TV) (Note: Unfinished film)

=== J ===
- Jungle Jim with Johnny Weissmuller
  1. Jungle Jim (1948)
  2. The Lost Tribe (1949)
  3. Captive Girl (1950)
  4. Mark of the Gorilla (1950)
  5. Jungle Jim in Pygmy Island (1950)
  6. Fury of the Congo (1951)
  7. Jungle Manhunt (1951)
  8. Jungle Jim in the Forbidden Land (1952)
  9. Voodoo Tiger (1952)
  10. Savage Mutiny (1953)
  11. Valley of the Headhunters (1953)
  12. Killer Ape (1953)
  13. Jungle Man-Eaters (1954)
  14. Cannibal Attack (1954)
  15. Jungle Moon Men (1955)
  16. Devil Goddess (1956)

=== O ===
- Old Mother Riley
  1. Old Mother Riley (1937)
  2. Kathleen Mavourneen (1937)
  3. Old Mother Riley MP (1938)
  4. Old Mother Riley in Paris (1938)
  5. Old Mother Riley Joins Up (1939)
  6. Old Mother Riley in Society (1940)
  7. Old Mother Riley in Business (1940)
  8. Old Mother Riley's Circus (1941)
  9. Old Mother Riley's Ghost (1941)
  10. Old Mother Riley Overseas (1943)
  11. Old Mother Riley Detective (1943)
  12. Old Mother Riley at Home (1945)
  13. Old Mother Riley's New Venture (1949)
  14. Old Mother Riley Headmistress (1950)
  15. Old Mother Riley's Jungle Treasure (1951)
  16. Mother Riley Meets the Vampire (1952)

=== S ===
- Sharpe
  1. Sharpe's Rifles (1993) (TV)
  2. Sharpe's Eagle (1993) (TV)
  3. Sharpe's Company (1994) (TV)
  4. Sharpe's Enemy (1994) (TV)
  5. Sharpe's Honour (1994) (TV)
  6. Sharpe's Gold (1995) (TV)
  7. Sharpe's Battle (1995) (TV)
  8. Sharpe's Sword (1995) (TV)
  9. Sharpe's Regiment (1996) (TV)
  10. Sharpe's Siege (1996) (TV)
  11. Sharpe's Mission (1996) (TV)
  12. Sharpe's Revenge (1997) (TV)
  13. Sharpe's Justice (1997) (TV)
  14. Sharpe's Waterloo (1997) (TV)
  15. Sharpe's Challenge (2006) (TV)
  16. Sharpe's Peril (2008) (TV)

== 17 ==
=== A ===
- Andy Hardy
  1. A Family Affair (1937)
  2. You're Only Young Once (1937)
  3. Judge Hardy's Children (1938)
  4. Love Finds Andy Hardy (1938)
  5. Out West with the Hardys (1938)
  6. Andy Hardy's Dilemma (1938) (short film)
  7. The Hardys Ride High (1939)
  8. Andy Hardy Gets Spring Fever (1939)
  9. Judge Hardy and Son (1939)
  10. Andy Hardy Meets Debutante (1940)
  11. Andy Hardy's Private Secretary (1941)
  12. Life Begins for Andy Hardy (1941)
  13. The Courtship of Andy Hardy (1942)
  14. Andy Hardy's Double Life (1942)
  15. Andy Hardy's Blonde Trouble (1944)
  16. Love Laughs at Andy Hardy (1947)
  17. Andy Hardy Comes Home (1958)

=== C ===
- Jetlag Productions' Children's Classics
  1. Happy, the Littlest Bunny (1994) (V)
  2. Cinderella (1994) (V)
  3. Leo the Lion: King of the Jungle (1994) (V)
  4. Pocahontas (1994) (V)
  5. A Christmas Carol (1994) (V)
  6. Heidi (1995) (V)
  7. Hercules (1995) (V)
  8. Alice in Wonderland (1995) (V)
  9. Sleeping Beauty (1995) (V)
  10. Snow White (1995) (V)
  11. Black Beauty (1995) (V)
  12. The Nutcracker (1995) (V)
  13. Little Red Riding Hood (1995) (V)
  14. Curly, the Littlest Puppy (1995) (V)
  15. Jungle Book (1995) (V)
  16. Magic Gift of the Snowman (1995) (V)
  17. The Hunchback of Notre Dame (1996) (V)

=== J ===
- Jones Family
  1. Every Saturday Night (1936)
  2. Educating Father (1936)
  3. Back to Nature (1936)
  4. Off to the Races (1937)
  5. Big Business (1937)
  6. Hot Water (1937)
  7. Borrowing Trouble (1937)
  8. Love on a Budget (1938)
  9. A Trip to Paris (1938)
  10. Safety in Numbers (1938)
  11. Down on the Farm (1938)
  12. Everybody's Baby (1939)
  13. The Jones Family in Hollywood (1939)
  14. Quick Millions (1939)
  15. Too Busy to Work (1939)
  16. Young as You Feel (1940)
  17. On Their Own (1940)

=== L ===
- The Lone Rider
  1. The Lone Rider Rides On (1941)
  2. The Lone Rider Crosses the Rio (1941)
  3. The Lone Rider in Ghost Town (1941)
  4. The Lone Rider in Frontier Fury (1941)
  5. The Lone Rider Ambushed (1941)
  6. The Lone Rider Fights Back (1941)
  7. The Lone Rider and the Bandit (1942)
  8. The Lone Rider in Cheyenne (1942)
  9. The Lone Rider in Texas Justice (1942)
  10. Border Roundup (1942)
  11. Overland Stagecoach (1942)
  12. Outlaws of Boulder Pass (1942)
  13. Wild Horse Rustlers (1943)
  14. Death Rides the Plains (1943)
  15. Wolves of the Range (1943)
  16. Law of the Saddle (1943)
  17. Raiders of Red Gap (1943)
- Looney Tunes and Merrie Melodies *********** (a)
  1. Bugs Bunny: Superstar (1975)
  2. The Bugs Bunny/Road Runner Movie (1979)
  3. The Looney Looney Looney Bugs Bunny Movie (1981)
  4. Bugs Bunny's 3rd Movie: 1001 Rabbit Tales (1982)
  5. Daffy Duck's Movie: Fantastic Island (1983)
  6. Daffy Duck's Quackbusters (1988)
  7. The Looney Tunes Hall of Fame (1991)
  8. Tiny Toon Adventures: How I Spent My Vacation (1992) (V)
  9. Space Jam (1996)
  10. Tweety's High-Flying Adventure (2000) (V)
  11. Baby Looney Tunes' Eggs-traordinary Adventure (2003) (V)
  12. Looney Tunes: Back in Action (2003)
  13. Bah, Humduck! A Looney Tunes Christmas (2006) (V)
  14. Looney Tunes: Rabbits Run (2015) (V)
  15. Space Jam: A New Legacy (2021)
  16. King Tweety (2022) (V)
  17. Taz: Quest for Burger (2023) (V)

=== M ===
- Monster High **

All were released direct-to-video unless otherwise indicated.

  1. Monster High: New Ghoul at School (2010) (TV)
  2. Monster High: Fright On! (2011) (TV)
  3. Monster High: Why Do Ghouls Fall in Love? (2012)
  4. Monster High: Escape from Skull Shores (2012)
  5. Monster High: Friday Night Frights (2012)
  6. Monster High: Ghouls Rule (2012)
  7. Monster High: Scaris: City of Frights (2013)
  8. Monster High: 13 Wishes (2013)
  9. Monster High: Frights, Camera, Action! (2014)
  10. Monster High: Freaky Fusion (2014)
  11. Monster High: Haunted (2015)
  12. Monster High: Boo York, Boo York (2015)
  13. Monster High: Great Scarrier Reef (2016)
  14. Welcome to Monster High (2016)
  15. Monster High: Electrified (2017)
  16. Monster High: The Movie (2022) (TV)
  17. Monster High 2 (2023) (TV)

=== R ===
- Rin Tin Tin *
  1. The Man from Hell's River (1922)
  2. Where the North Begins (1923)
  3. Shadows of the North (1923)
  4. The Lighthouse by the Sea (1924)
  5. The Clash of the Wolves (1925)
  6. The Night Cry (1926)
  7. While London Sleeps (1926)
  8. Hills of Kentucky (1927)
  9. Tracked by the Police (1927)
  10. A Race for Life (1928)
  11. Jaws of Steel (1928)
  12. The Million Dollar Collar (1929)
  13. A Dog of the Regiment (1929)
  14. Tiger Rose (1929)
  15. The Lightning Warrior (1931)
  16. The Adventures of Rex and Rinty (1935) (serial)
  17. The Return of Rin Tin Tin (1947)

=== S ===
- Star Wars (a) ******************
  1. Star Wars (1977)
  2. Star Wars Holiday Special (1978) (TV) (spin-off)
  3. The Empire Strikes Back (1980)
  4. Return of the Jedi (1983)
  5. Caravan of Courage: An Ewok Adventure (1984) (TV) (spin-off)
  6. Ewoks: The Battle for Endor (1985) (TV) (spin-off)
  7. Star Wars: Episode I – The Phantom Menace (1999) (prequel)
  8. Star Wars: Episode II – Attack of the Clones (2002) (prequel)
  9. Star Wars: Episode III – Revenge of the Sith (2005) (prequel)
  10. Star Wars: The Clone Wars (2008) (A) (spin-off)
  11. Star Wars: The Force Awakens (2015)
  12. Rogue One: A Star Wars Story (2016) (spin-off)
  13. Star Wars: The Last Jedi (2017)
  14. Solo: A Star Wars Story (2018) (spin-off)
  15. Star Wars: The Rise of Skywalker (2019)
  16. The Mandalorian and Grogu (2026) (spin-off)
  17. Star Wars: Starfighter (2027) (spin-off)

=== T ===
- Tom and Jerry ******* (a)
  1. Tom and Jerry: The Movie (1992)
  2. Tom and Jerry: The Magic Ring (2001) (V)
  3. Tom and Jerry: Blast Off to Mars (2005) (V)
  4. Tom and Jerry: The Fast and the Furry (2005) (V)
  5. Tom and Jerry: Shiver Me Whiskers (2006) (V)
  6. Tom and Jerry: A Nutcracker Tale (2007) (V)
  7. Tom and Jerry Meet Sherlock Holmes (2010) (V)
  8. Tom and Jerry and the Wizard of Oz (2011) (V)
  9. Tom and Jerry: Robin Hood and His Merry Mouse (2012) (V)
  10. Tom and Jerry's Giant Adventure (2013) (V)
  11. Tom and Jerry: The Lost Dragon (2014) (V)
  12. Tom and Jerry: Spy Quest (2015) (V)
  13. Tom and Jerry: Back to Oz (2016) (V)
  14. Tom and Jerry: Willy Wonka and the Chocolate Factory (2017) (V)
  15. Tom & Jerry (2021)
  16. Tom and Jerry: Cowboy Up! (2022) (V)
  17. Tom and Jerry: Snowman's Land (2022) (V)

=== W ===
- Witchcraft
  1. Witchcraft (1988) (V)
  2. Witchcraft II: The Temptress (1990) (V)
  3. Witchcraft III: The Kiss of Death (1991) (V)
  4. Witchcraft IV: The Virgin Heart (1992) (V)
  5. Witchcraft V: Dance with the Devil (1993) (V)
  6. Witchcraft VI: The Devil's Mistress (1994) (V)
  7. Witchcraft VII: Judgement Hour (1995) (V)
  8. Witchcraft VIII: Salem's Ghost (1996) (V)
  9. Witchcraft IX: Bitter Flesh (1997) (V)
  10. Witchcraft X: Mistress of the Craft (1998) (V)
  11. Witchcraft XI: Sisters in Blood (2000) (V)
  12. Witchcraft XII: In the Lair of the Serpent (2002) (V)
  13. Witchcraft XIII: Blood of the Chosen (2006) (V)
  14. Witchcraft XIV: Angel of Death (2015) (V)
  15. Witchcraft XV: Blood Rose (2015) (V)
  16. Witchcraft XVI: Hollywood Coven (2015) (V)
  17. Witchcraft XVII: The Initiation (2025) (V)

=== Z ===
- Za La Mort
  1. Nelly la Gigolette (1914)
  2. Za La Mort (1915)
  3. L'Imboscata (1916)
  4. Anime Buie (1916)
  5. Il Numero 121 (1917)
  6. L'Ultima Impresa (1917)
  7. Il Triangolo Giallo (Serial, 1917)
  8. Nel Gorgo (1918)
  9. I Topi Grigi (Serial, 1918)
  10. Sua Eccellenza La Morte (1919)
  11. Dollari e fracks (Serial, 1919)
  12. Il Castello di Bronzo (1920)
  13. Quale dei due? a.k.a. Za La Mort contro Za La Mort (1922)
  14. Un Frak e un Apache (1923)
  15. Za La Mort (film) – Der Traum der Zalavie (1924)
  16. Ultimissime della Notte (1924)
  17. The Opium Den (1947)

== 18 ==
=== A ===
- The Amityville Horror
  1. The Amityville Horror (1979)
  2. Amityville II: The Possession (1982)
  3. Amityville 3-D (1983)
  4. Amityville 4: The Evil Escapes (1989)
  5. The Amityville Curse (1990)
  6. Amityville 1992: It's About Time (1992)
  7. Amityville: A New Generation (1993)
  8. Amityville Dollhouse (1996)
  9. The Amityville Horror (2005)
  10. The Amityville Haunting (2011)
  11. The Amityville Asylum (2013)
  12. Amityville Death House (2015)
  13. The Amityville Playhouse (2015)
  14. Amityville: Vanishing Point (2016)
  15. The Amityville Legacy (2016)
  16. The Amityville Terror (2016)
  17. Amityville: No Escape (2016)
  18. Amityville: The Awakening (2017)

=== E ===
- Eddie Dean
  1. Song of Old Wyoming (1945)
  2. Romance of the West (1946)
  3. The Caravan Trail (1946)
  4. Colorado Serenade (1946)
  5. Tumbleweed Trail (1946)
  6. Driftin' River (1946)
  7. Stars Over Texas (1946)
  8. Wild West (1946)
  9. Wild Country (1947)
  10. Range Beyond the Blue (1947)
  11. West to Glory (1947)
  12. Black Hills (1947)
  13. Shadow Valley (1947)
  14. Check Your Guns (1948)
  15. Tornado Range (1948)
  16. The Westward Trail (1948)
  17. The Hawk of Powder River (1948)
  18. The Tioga Kid (1948)

=== Z ===
- Zenigata Heiji, portrayed by Kazuo Hasegawa
  1. Zenigata Heiji Torimono-Hikae: Heiji Happyakuyacho (1949)
  2. Zenigata Heiji (1951)
  3. Zenigata Heiji Torimono-Hikae: Koibumi Dochu (1951)
  4. Zenigata Heiji Torimono-Hikae: Jigoku no Mon (1952)
  5. Zenigata Heiji Torimono-Hikae: Karakuri Yashiki (1953)
  6. Zenigata Heiji Torimono-Hikae: Kin'iro no ókami (1953)
  7. Zenigata Heiji Torimono-Hikae: Yūrei Daimyō (1954)
  8. Zenigata Heiji Torimono-Hikae: Dokuro Kago (1955)
  9. Zenigata Heiji Torimono-Hikae: Shi Bijin Fuuro (1956)
  10. Zenigata Heiji Torimono-Hikae: Hitohada Gumo (1956)
  11. Zenigata Heiji Torimono-Hikae: Madara Hebi (1957)
  12. Zenigata Heiji Torimono-Hikae: Megitsune Yashiki (1957)
  13. Zenigata Heiji Torimono-Hikae: Hachinin no Hanayome (1958)
  14. Zenigata Heiji Torimono-Hikae: Onibi Tourou (1958)
  15. Zenigata Heiji Torimono-Hikae: Yuki-onna no Ashiato (1958)
  16. Zenigata Heiji Torimono-Hikae: Bijin-gumo (1960)
  17. Zenigata Heiji Torimono-Hikae: Yoru no Emma Chou (1961)
  18. Zenigata Heiji Torimono-Hikae: Bijin Zame (1961)

== 19 ==
=== H ===
- Herc-Xenaverse (a) ***
  1. The Warrior's Husband (1933)
  2. The Three Stooges Meet Hercules (1962)
  3. Jason and the Argonauts (1963)
  4. Hercules in New York (1970)
  5. Hercules (1983)
  6. The Adventures of Hercules (1985)
  7. Hercules and the Amazon Women (1994) (TV)
  8. Hercules and the Lost Kingdom (1994) (TV)
  9. Hercules and the Circle of Fire (1994) (TV)
  10. Hercules in the Underworld (1994) (TV)
  11. Hercules in the Maze of the Minotaur (1994) (TV)
  12. Hercules (1995) (A) (V)
  13. Hercules (1997) (A)
  14. Hercules and Xena – The Animated Movie: The Battle for Mount Olympus (1998) (A) (V)
  15. Young Hercules (1998) (V)
  16. Hercules: Zero to Hero (1999) (A) (V)
  17. Immortals (2011)
  18. The Legend of Hercules (2014)
  19. Hercules (2014)
- Hercules
  1. Le Fatiche di Ercole (The Labors of Hercules) (1957)
  2. Ercole e la regina di Lidia (Hercules and the Queen of Lydia) (1959)
  3. La Vendetta di Ercole (The Revenge of Hercules) (1960)
  4. Gli Amori di Ercole (The Loves of Hercules) (1960)
  5. Ercole alla conquista di Atlantide (Hercules at the Conquest of Atlantis) (1961)
  6. Ercole al centro della terra (Hercules at the Center of the Earth) (1961)
  7. Maciste contro Ercole nella valle dei guai (Maciste vs. Hercules in the Vale of Woe) (1961)
  8. Ulisse contro Ercole (Ulysses vs. Hercules) (1962)
  9. La Furia di Ercole (The Fury of Hercules) (1962) (a.k.a. The Fury of Samson)
  10. Ercole sfida Sansone (Hercules Challenges Samson) (1963)
  11. Ercole contro Molock (Hercules vs. Moloch) (1963) (a.k.a. The Conquest of Mycene)
  12. Ercole l'invincibile (Hercules the Invincible) (1964)
  13. Il Trionfo di Ercole (The Triumph of Hercules) (1964) (a.k.a. Hercules and the Ten Avengers)
  14. Ercole contro Roma (Hercules Against Rome) (1964)
  15. Ercole contro i figli del sole (Hercules Against the Sons of the Sun) (1964)
  16. Ercole, Sansone, Maciste e Ursus: gli invincibili (Hercules, Samson, Maciste and Ursus: The Invincibles) (1964)
  17. Ercole contro i tiranni di Babilonia (Hercules Against the Tyrants of Babylon) (1964)
  18. Hercules and the Princess of Troy (1965) (a.k.a. Hercules vs. the Sea Monster) (TV)
  19. Sfida dei giganti (Challenge of the Giants) (1965) (TV)

=== K ===
- Koichiro Uno Sex Stories
  1. Koichiro Uno's Up & Wet (1976)
  2. Koichiro Uno's Yummy and Meaty (1977)
  3. Koichiro Uno's Up and Down (1977)
  4. Koichiro Uno's Wet and Open (1979)
  5. Koichiro Uno's Nurses' Journal (1979)
  6. Koichiro Uno's Female Gymnastic Teacher (1979)
  7. Koichiro Uno's Moist and Steamy (1979)
  8. Koichiro Uno's Wet and Purring (1980)
  9. Koichiro Uno's Hotel Maid Diary (1980)
  10. Koichiro Uno's Shell Competition (1980)
  11. Koichiro Uno's Adultery Diary (1980)
  12. Koichiro Uno's Wet and Riding (1981)
  13. Koichiro Uno's Teasing A Wife (1982)
  14. Koichiro Uno's Female Doctor Is Also Wet (1982)
  15. Koichiro Uno's Dirty Sisters' Barber Shoppe (1983)
  16. Koichiro Uno's Wet and Leering (1983)
  17. Koichiro Uno's Wet and Swinging (1984)
  18. Koichiro Uno's Dancer of Izu (1984)
  19. Koichiro Uno's Caressing the Peach (1985)

=== M ===
- Mind's Eye (A)
  1. The Mind's Eye: A Computer Animation Odyssey (1990) (V)
  2. Beyond the Mind's Eye (1992) (V)
  3. The Gate to the Mind's Eye (1994) (V)
  4. Odyssey Into The Mind's Eye (1996) (V)
  5. Virtual Nature: A Computer Generated Visual Odyssey From the Makers of the Mind's Eye (1993) (V)
  6. The Mind's Eye Presents Luminous Visions (1998) (V)
  7. The Mind's Eye Presents Ancient Alien (1998) (V)
  8. The Mind's Eye Presents Little Bytes (2000) (V)
  9. Imaginaria (1994) (V)
  10. Turbulence (1997) (V)
  11. Computer Animation Festival Volume 1.0 (1993) (V)
  12. Computer Animation Festival Volume 2.0 (1994) (V)
  13. Computer Animation Festival Volume 3.0 (1996) (V)
  14. Cyberscape: A Computer Animation Vision (1997) (V)
  15. The Mind's Eye Presents Computer Animation Classics (1997) (V)
  16. The Mind's Eye Presents Computer Animation Showcase (1997) (V)
  17. The Mind's Eye Presents Computer Animation Celebration (1998) (V)
  18. Computer Animation Marvels (1999) (V)
  19. Computer Animation Extravaganza (2000) (V)

=== R ===
- Red Shoe Diaries *
  1. Red Shoe Diaries (1992) (TV)
  2. Red Shoe Diaries 2: Double Dare (1993) (V)
  3. Red Shoe Diaries 3: Another Woman's Lipstick (1993) (V)
  4. Red Shoe Diaries 9: Hotline (1994)
  5. Red Shoe Diaries 4: Auto Erotica (1994) (V)
  6. Red Shoe Diaries 5: Weekend Pass (1995) (V)
  7. Red Shoe Diaries 13: Four on the Floor (1996) (V)
  8. Red Shoe Diaries 9: Slow Train (1996) (V)
  9. Red Shoe Diaries 6: How I Met My Husband (1996) (V)
  10. Red Shoe Diaries 11: Farmer's Daughter (1997) (V)
  11. Red Shoe Diaries 16: Temple of Flesh (1997) (V)
  12. Red Shoe Diaries 7: Burning Up (1997) (V)
  13. Red Shoe Diaries 8: Night of Abandon (1997) (V)
  14. Red Shoe Diaries 12: Girl on a Bike (2000) (V)
  15. Red Shoe Diaries 18: The Game (2000) (V)
  16. Red Shoe Diaries 14: Luscious Lola (2000) (V)
  17. Red Shoe Diaries 19: As She Wishes (2001) (V)
  18. Red Shoe Diaries 17: Swimming Naked (2001) (V)
  19. Red Shoe Diaries 15: Forbidden Zone (2002) (V)

=== U ===
- Uuno Turhapuro
  1. Uuno Turhapuro (1973)
  2. Professori Uuno D.G. Turhapuro (1975)
  3. Lottovoittaja UKK Turhapuro (1976)
  4. Häpy Endkö? Eli kuinka Uuno Turhapuro sai niin kauniin ja rikkaan vaimon (1977)
  5. Rautakauppias Uuno Turhapuro - presidentin vävy (1978)
  6. Uuno Turhapuron aviokriisi (1981)
  7. Uuno Turhapuro menettää muistinsa (1982)
  8. Uuno Turhapuron muisti palailee pätkittäin (1983)
  9. Uuno Turhapuro armeijan leivissä (1984)
  10. Uuno Epsanjassa (1985)
  11. Uuno Turhapuro muuttaa maalle (1986)
  12. Uuno Turhapuro – kaksoisagentti (1987)
  13. Tupla-Uuno (1988)
  14. Uunon huikeat poikamiesvuodet maaseudulla (1990)
  15. Uuno Turhapuro - herra Helsingin herra (1991)
  16. Uuno Turhapuro - Suomen tasavallan herra presidentti (1992)
  17. Uuno Turhapuron poika (1993)
  18. Johtaja Uuno Turhapuro - pisnismies (1998)
  19. Uuno Turhapuro – This Is My Life (2004)

=== W ===
- Wakadaishō series
  1. Daigaku no Wakadaishō (1961)
  2. Ginza no Wakadaishō (1962)
  3. Nihon-ichi no Wakadaishō (1962)
  4. Hawai no Wakadaishō (1963)
  5. Umi no Wakadaishō (1965)
  6. Ereki no Wakadaishō (1965)
  7. Arupusu no Wakadaishō (1966)
  8. Rettsu Go! Wakadaishō (1966)
  9. Minami Taiheiyō no Wakadaishō (1967)
  10. Gō! Gō! Wakadaishō (1967)
  11. Rio no Wakadaishō (1968)
  12. Freshman Wakadaishō (1969)
  13. New Zealand no Wakadaishō (1969)
  14. Bravo! Wakadaishō (1970)
  15. Ore no Sora da ze! Wakadaishō (1970)
  16. Wakadaishō Tai Aodaishō (1971)
  17. Gambare Wakadaishō (1975)
  18. Gekitotsu Wakadaishō (1976)
  19. Kaette Kita Wakadaishō (1981)

== 20 ==
=== D ===
- Debbie Does Dallas *
  1. Debbie Does Dallas (1978)
  2. Debbie Does Dallas 2 (1981)
  3. Debbie Does Dallas 3 (1985)
  4. Debbie Does Dallas 4 (1988)
  5. Debbie Does Dallas 5 (1988)
  6. Debbie Does Las Vegas (1982)
  7. Debbie Does 'em All (1985)
  8. Debbie Does the Devil in Dallas (1987)
  9. Debbie Does 'em All 2 (1988)
  10. Debbie Does 'em All 3 (1989)
  11. Debbie Does Wall Street (1991) (V)
  12. Dallas Does Debbie (1992) (V)
  13. Debbie Does Dallas ... Again (1994) (V)
  14. Debbie Does Dallas: The Next Generation (1997) (V)
  15. Debbie Does Dallas '99 (1999) (V)
  16. Debbie Does Iowa (2000) (V)
  17. Debbie Does New Orleans (2000) (V)
  18. Debbie Does Dallas: The Revenge (2003) (V)
  19. Debbie Does Dallas: East vs. West (2004) (V)
  20. Debbie Does S&M (2005) (V)

=== E ===
- Enchanted Tales (A)
  1. Snow White (1994) (V)
  2. The Jungle King (1994) (V)
  3. The Night Before Christmas (1994) (V)
  4. The New Adventures of Peter Rabbit (1995) (V)
  5. Pocahontas (1995) (V)
  6. The Prince and the Pauper (1995) (V)
  7. Noah's Ark (1995) (V)
  8. The Christmas Elves (1995) (V)
  9. Gulliver's Travels (1996) (V)
  10. Treasure Island (1996) (V)
  11. The Hunchback of Notre Dame (1996) (V)
  12. The Princess Castle (1996) (V)
  13. Tom Thumb Meets Thumbelina (1996) (V)
  14. Hercules (1997) (V)
  15. Anastasia (1997) (V)
  16. Beauty and the Beast (1997) (V)
  17. Camelot (1998) (V)
  18. A Tale of Egypt (1998) (V)
  19. The Legend of Su-Ling (1998) (V)
  20. Tarzan of the Apes (1999) (V)

=== F ===
- Father of Four
  1. Father of Four (1953)
  2. Father of Four in the Snow (1954)
  3. Father of Four in the Country (1955)
  4. Father of Four in the City (1956)
  5. Father of Four and Uncle Sofus (1957)
  6. Father of Four and the Wolf Cubs (1958)
  7. Father of Four on Bornholm (1959)
  8. Father of Four with Full Music (1961)
  9. Father of Four in Good Humor (1971)
  10. Father of Four Never Gives Up (2005)
  11. Father of Four: Living Large (2006)
  12. Father of Four: Home Field Advantage (2008)
  13. Father of Four in Japanese (2010)
  14. Father of Four Back in the Nature (2011)
  15. Father of Four to Seas (2012)
  16. Father of Four Uncle Sofus Returns (2014)
  17. Father of Fours Wild Vacation (2015)
  18. Father of Four on the Top (2017)
  19. Father of Four in the Sun (2018)
  20. Father of Four and the Vikings (2020)
- Feluda
  1. Sonar Kella (1974)
  2. Joi Baba Felunath (1979)
  3. Ghurghutiyar Ghotona (1992) (TV)
  4. Golokdham Rahasya (1992) (TV)
  5. Baksho Rahashya (1996) (TV)
  6. Gosaipur Sargaram (1996) (TV)
  7. Sheyal Debota Rahasya (1996) (TV)
  8. Bosepukure Khunkharapi (1996) (TV)
  9. Joto Kando Kathmandute (1996) (TV)
  10. Jahangirer Swarnamudra (1999) (TV)
  11. Ghurghutiyar Ghotona (1999) (TV)
  12. Golapi Mukto Rahashya (1999) (TV)
  13. Ambar Sen Antardhan Rahashya (1999) (TV)
  14. Dr. Munshir Diary (2000) (TV)
  15. Bombaiyer Bombete (2003)
  16. Kailashey Kelenkari (2007)
  17. Tintorettor Jishu (2008)
  18. Gorosthaney Sabdhan (2010)
  19. Royal Bengal Rahashya (2011)
  20. Double Feluda (2016)

=== N ===
- Nevada Jack McKenzie
  1. The Ghost Rider (1943)
  2. The Stranger from Pecos (1943)
  3. Six Gun Gospel (1943)
  4. Outlaws of Stampede Pass (1943)
  5. The Texas Kid (1943)
  6. Raiders of the Border (1944)
  7. Partners of the Trail (1944)
  8. Law Men (1944)
  9. Range Law (1944)
  10. West of the Rio Grande (1944)
  11. Land of the Outlaws (1944)
  12. Law of the Valley (1944)
  13. Ghost Guns (1944)
  14. The Navajo Trail (1945)
  15. Gun Smoke (1945)
  16. Stranger from Santa Fe (1945)
  17. The Lost Trail (1945)
  18. Frontier Feud (1945)
  19. Border Bandits (1946)
  20. The Haunted Mine (1946)

=== T ===
- Troublesome Night
  1. Troublesome Night (1997)
  2. Troublesome Night 2 (1997)
  3. Troublesome Night 3 (1998)
  4. Troublesome Night 4 (1998)
  5. Troublesome Night 5 (1999)
  6. Troublesome Night 6 (1999)
  7. Troublesome Night 7 (2000)
  8. Troublesome Night 8 (2000)
  9. Troublesome Night 9 (2001)
  10. Troublesome Night 10 (2001)
  11. Troublesome Night 11 (2001)
  12. Troublesome Night 12 (2001)
  13. Troublesome Night 13 (2002)
  14. Troublesome Night 14 (2002)
  15. Troublesome Night 15 (2002)
  16. Troublesome Night 16 (2002)
  17. Troublesome Night 17 (2002)
  18. Troublesome Night 18 (2003)
  19. Troublesome Night 19 (2003)
  20. Always Be with You (2017)

=== V ===
- Vacanze di Natale
  1. Vacanze di Natale (1983)
  2. Vacanze in America (1985)
  3. Montecarlo Gran Casinò (1987)
  4. Vacanze di Natale '90 (1990)
  5. Vacanze di Natale '91 (1991)
  6. Vacanze di Natale '95 (1995)
  7. Vacanze di Natale 2000 (1999)
  8. Merry Christmas (2001)
  9. Natale sul Nilo (2002)
  10. Natale in India (2003)
  11. Christmas in Love (2004)
  12. Natale a Miami (2005)
  13. Natale a New York (2006)
  14. Natale in crociera (2007)
  15. Natale a Rio (2008)
  16. Natale a Beverly Hills (2009)
  17. A Natale mi sposo (2010)
  18. Natale in Sudafrica (2010)
  19. Vacanze di Natale a Cortina (2011)
  20. Un Natale al Sud (2016)
