= Witchcraft VII: Judgement Hour =

- Directed by: Michael Paul Girard
- Written by: Jerry Feifer (story by); Peter Flemming
- Produced by: Michael Feifer
- Starring: David Byrnes; April Breneman; Loren Schmalle; Alisha Christensen; Ashlie Rhey
- Cinematography: Denis Maloney
- Edited by: Tony Miller
- Music by: Miriam Cutler
- Distributed by: Simitar Entertainment (US, DVD)
- Release date: 1995
- Running time: 95 min.
- Country: United States
- Language: English

Witchcraft VII: Judgement Hour (also known as Witchcraft 7: A Taste for Blood) is a 1995 American horror film directed by Michael Paul Girard and starring David Byrnes, April Breneman, Loren Schmalle, Alisha Christensen, and Ashlie Rhey. The seventh instalment in the Witchcraft film series, it was produced by Vista Street Entertainment and released direct-to-video on December 27, 1995, by Troma Studios. The script was written by Peter Flemming.

== Plot ==
A vampire, Martin Hassa (Loren Schmalle), is attacking young women in the Los Angeles area, and while at a party, he attacks and leaves Rachel (Ashlie Rhey) for dead. Jack (Mark Blydel) and Emily (Aline Kassman) have summoned their friend and lawyer, Will Spanner (David Byrnes) to the hospital as their child was hit by a drunk driver. While there, Spanner sees Rachel's roommate Sally (Mai-Lis Holmes) bring her into the hospital, and after Rachel's death sees the priest giving last rites have his rosary explode during the ceremony.

An investigation into Rachel reveals a plot by Hassa to control the nation's blood supply, leading to the deduction that Hassa is a vampire. The investigation reveals that Hassa is not only a vampire, but also the owner of the Romanian Cobol Corporation, the company which is entering a business merger that will give it control of the world's blood supply.

Suspicious, Spanner calls LAPD Detective Lutz (Alisa Christensen), who with partner Detective Garner (John Cragen) head to the hospital in time to see Rachel rise from the dead. Rachel overpowers Spanner and the two detectives, and a pursuit of Rachel by the Detectives only shows that bullets will not stop her, resulting in Will staking her. Hassa possesses and forces Keli to attack Will. Convinced of what's happening, Lutz and Garner accompany Will to the merger meeting, where they shoot Hassa's underlings.

Spanner, Lutz and Garner manage to foil these plans at the last minute, but not without the death of one of the trio of investigators as Will stakes Hassa but is mortally wounded himself. Hassa makes it back to Keli and tries to convince her to help him, but she finishes him off instead.

== Cast ==
- David Byrnes as Will Spanner
- April Breneman as Keli
- Loren Schmalle as Martin Hassa
- Alisa Christensen as Detective Lutz
- Ashlie Rhey as Rachel
- John Cragen as Detective Garner
- Mark Blydel as Jack
- Aline Kassman as Emily
- Mai-Lis Holmes as Sally

== Production ==
Witchcraft VII: Judgement Hour was intended to be the last entry in the series; the VHS box describes the film as "the final chapter". The film was released as Witchcraft 7: A Taste for Blood in the United Kingdom.

Main character Will Spanner is played by David Byrnes, who would return for Witchcraft IX: Bitter Flesh. Director Michael Paul Girard also returned to helm Witchcraft IX. Detective Lutz, a male character in the previous film, Witchcraft VI: The Devil's Mistress, is retconned into a female character and played by Alisa Christensen, although a later episode describes this character as a relative. Her partner Detective Garner also returns, this time played by a younger actor, John Cragen. Spanner's girlfriend Keli is once again played by a different actress, April Breneman.

== Reception ==
Critical reception to the film was mostly negative. AllMovie gave Witchcraft VII: Judgement Hour 2.5 stars out of 5. In a one star review, TV Guide said that it offered "little in the way of thrills or imagination" and that the series had "strayed so far from its original conception that there's no actual witchcraft in this instalment". While a seduction scene with Ashlie Rhey was highlighted as being "fairly sensual" and although the opening scenes features some "decent acting", the review concludes that the film "quickly descends into half-baked confrontations, ineffective erotica, unpersuasive histrionics, and illogical scripting."

In October 2015, Katie Rife of The A.V. Club named the film the fifth-best in the (then 13-film long) series, saying that it had a "nice mid-’90s feel to it". Although Rife found it to be "the most gratuitously sexist" of all the films, it was a "fun watch", "despite all its ickiness and bad special effects." In a negative review for CraveOnline, Witney Seibold also noted the lack of witchcraft in the "out-and-out vampire movie", which featured "truly baffling scene[s]", "one of the silliest movie monsters I've ever seen" and "pervy" camera work.

== Continuity ==
Spanner's use of his powers is very limited in the film. The next film in the series is Witchcraft VIII: Salem's Ghost, although it is a standalone film and not a direct sequel. The film which resolves Spanner's death is Witchcraft IX: Bitter Flesh.
