= Witchcraft II: The Temptress =

1990 film directed by Mark Woods

- DVD cover
- Directed by: Mark Woods
- Written by: Jim Hanson; Sal Manna
- Produced by: Megan Barnett, Jerry Feifer; Renza Mizbani
- Starring: Charles Solomon; Delia Sheppard; David Homb
- Cinematography: Jens Sturup
- Edited by: Tony Miller
- Music by: Miriam Cutler
- Distributed by: Simitar Entertainment (US, DVD)
- Release date: May 20, 1990
- Running time: 88 minutes
- Country: United States
- Language: English
- Budget: US$80,000

Witchcraft II: The Temptress is a 1990 American horror film directed by Mark Woods and starring Charles Solomon, Delia Sheppard, David Homb, Mia M. Ruiz, Jay Richardson, Cheryl Janecky, Mary Shelley, and Frank Woods. The screenplay was written by Jim Hanson and Sal Manna. It is a sequel to the 1988 direct-to-video film Witchcraft, and the second instalment in the Witchcraft series. It is followed by Witchcraft III: The Kiss of Death (1990).

== Plot ==
About 18 years after the first film's ending, William Adams is living with his adopted parents and assumes he is a normal 18 year old. He is unaware of his adoption. William's adoptive parents stole him away from the coven in the previous film, as they are white witches who did not agree with the aims of their coven. They have hidden William in the suburbs to protect him from evil.

His neighbor Deloris leaves William a strange object in an attempt to get William to join the dark side.

Unknown to William, he is the son of a powerful warlock and has inherited his father's powers. The father and many of his paternal relatives are members of a coven who have spent years attempting to bring about the end of the world. Deloris's ultimate goal is to and have William father her child, who will bring about hell on earth. At the last possible moment, William (with Spanner as his last name) is able to defeat the witch and resist evil.

== Cast ==
- Charles Solomon as William Spanner
- Mia Ruiz as Michelle
- Delia Sheppard as Deloris Jones
- David L. Homb as Boomer
- Kirsten Wagner as Audrey
- Cheryl Janecky as William's mom

== Reception ==
TV Guide found that while both Ruiz and Janecky are visibly talented actors, the film was lacking, garnering only 1 out of 5 stars In Creature Feature, the film was given two out of five stars, stating that it intends to be deadly serious, but comes across as unintentionally funny.

== Production ==
The film cost $80,000 to make and wound up making over one million dollars for the distributors.

The film contains a notice that "This movie is not intended as an accurate portrayal of true witches".

== Home media ==
The film was released on video in May 1990 and re-released on DVD format on October 22, 1997.

== See also ==
- List of films about witchcraft
