= Horror House on Highway 5 =

Horror House on Highway Five
- Promotional artwork
- Directed by: Richard Casey
- Written by: Richard Casey
- Produced by: John Marsh (executive producer)
- Starring: Phil Therrien; Max Manthey; Michael Castagnolia; Susan Leslie; Richard Meltzer
- Cinematography: David Golia
- Music by: Kraig Grady; Suzanne McDermott
- Distributed by: Simitar Video
- Release date: June 1985
- Running time: 91 minutes
- Country: United States
- Language: English

Horror House on Highway 5 is a 1985 American slasher film written and directed by Richard Casey. Its plot follows three college students researching the case of a missing scientist and possible Nazi in a small California town, who fall prey to two insane brothers, as well as a killer donning a Richard Nixon mask.

== Plot ==
While preparing for a night out, a young man attempts to frighten his girlfriend with a Richard Nixon mask. Outside, a killer murders him and steals the mask, before also killing his girlfriend. A short time later, Los Angeles City College students Louise Kingsley, Michael Simpson, and Sally Smith are appointed to do a research project on a supposedly-deceased German expatriate rocket scientist named Frederick Bartholomew. Bartholomew was allegedly responsible for the V-2 rocket before embarking on a murderous rampage in the small community of Littletown, slaying all who he worked with in his final days spent in America. It is also suspected he may have been a Nazi.

Sally meets with Littletown local Dr. Marbuse and his brother, Gary, to interview them about Bartholomew. Sally is unaware that Marbuse is a mentally-ill, unlicensed physician who believes parasites have infested his brain; Gary is a shy, lonely psychopath obsessed with reading tarot cards. Meanwhile, their father—who is in fact Frederick Bartholomew—prowls lonely highways at night, stalking motorists. Marbuse and Gary drug and kidnap Sally, holding her hostage in their home, and subjecting her to haphazard occult rituals.

That night, Bartholomew, dressed in the Richard Nixon mask, attacks a young couple parked in a car. After a fight ensues, the young, drunken man hits Bartholomew with his car, but it only momentarily stuns Bartholomew; however, the male driver is killed on impact. His girlfriend survives, only to be attacked and murdered by Bartholomew. Meanwhile, Michael and Louise park their van in a remote area near Littletown to begin working on a model V-2 rocket, but become stranded when their van fails to start. Michael walks to the nearest house, which happens to be the home where Bartholomew killed the young couple and stole the Richard Nixon mask; Michael finds their corpses lying in the living room.

Michael enters an adjacent home searching for a telephone, unaware this is the house where Marbuse and Gary are keeping Sally. He becomes lost in its labyrinthine, red-lit hallways. In a darkened corridor, he finds his way into an abandoned basement, and is struck by an apparently supernatural force. He grows delirious and falls onto the ground, landing on a rake that lacerates his head. From behind a window, Bartholomew observes Michael. Meanwhile, Louise, waiting at the van, is startled by rustling noises emanating from the underbrush, and flees. She also enters the house, and locates Sally. Louise attempts to unchain her, but is stopped by Gary, who bludgeons Sally to death.

Louise wanders through the house, and also encounters an invisible supernatural force, as well as finding a dead body of one of Bartholomew's recent victims. In a darkened room, Louise finds Michael, the rake still stuck in his head. When she attempts to remove it, he collapses and dies. Louise eventually wanders outside, only to be attacked by Marbuse, armed with a brace drill. He chases Louise back to the van, where she manages to bludgeon him to death. She is subsequently confronted by Bartholomew, whom she temporarily stuns by detonating the model V-2 rocket, only to find, after removing his Richard Nixon mask, worms crawling from his eye sockets, suggesting he is undead. Back at the house, Gary somberly dances with Susan's corpse.

At dawn, Louise, having fallen asleep in underbrush, awakens and wanders down a hillside toward the highway. A man driving a van stops and picks her up. Louise attempts to explain to the man that her friends have been killed, and the man agrees to stop at a call box along the freeway to phone police. The man attempts to coax Louise into the back of the van, promising her there are blankets and hot cocoa. When she opens the rear door, she is attacked by Bartholomew, who attempts to pull her into the van, but she manages to free herself by biting him. As the van speeds onto the highway, Louise lies on the side of the road, watching it drive into the distance.

== Cast ==
- Phil Therrien as Dr. Marbuse
- Max Manthey as Gary
- Irene Cagen as Sally Smith (as Irene F.)
- Michael Castagnolia as Michael, "The Pothead"
- Susan Leslie as Louise
- Randy Daitch as the Teacher
- William Pope as Gentleman
- Richard Meltzer as Tough Guy
- Kathleen Battersby as Housewife
- Steve DeVorkin as Van Driver
- Ronald W. Reagan as Richard M. Nixon

== Production ==
Director Richard Casey, who had previously directed several independent music videos in the Los Angeles area, began production on Horror House on Highway 5 around 1980. By Casey's account, the film was shot over a period of several years, which accounts for a number of continuity errors and disappearances of characters in the film.

== Release ==
=== Home media ===
Horror House on Highway 5 was released on VHS by Simitar Video in 1985, and reissued on July 16, 1991. A DVD edition was released by Jef Films on July 18, 2006. Vinegar Syndrome released a Blu-ray and DVD combination pack of the film in 2017, which was limited to 3,000 units.

== Reception ==
Film critic Alex Koehn, interviewed for the Courier News, wrote that the film is "very scary and very funny at the same time, and we know that's one of the problems that most general filmgoers have."

Chris Coffel, reviewing the film in 2016 for Film School Rejects, wrote: "This is a wildly nonsensical movie. So much so that I have a really hard time believing there was an actual script written. The only semblance of a script is with the use of repetition but even that comes across poorly due to the horrendous acting. The film also contains some pretty awful music stings and has extremely clunky pacing... And yet I find it to be oddly mesmerizing. Horror House on Highway Five feels very genuine. I think the goal here was to make a suspenseful but humorous slasher. The problem is nothing quite works."

Presenting the film in promotion of a 2016 screening, the Spectacle Theater noted in a press release: "One of the most confusing and compelling homemade horror films ever made, future music video director Richard Casey’s debut feature film, shot over years on nights and weekends, is a delirious collage of oddball gore, ludicrous plot twists, and a general milieu of weirdness unlike anything else in cinema history."
