= Bikini Drive-In =

- VHS cover art
- Directed by: Fred Olen Ray
- Produced by: executive Jim Wynorski
- Starring: Ashlie Rhey; Richard Gabai
- Cinematography: Gary Graver
- Production company: American Independent Productions
- Release date: 1995
- Country: United States
- Language: English

Bikini Drive-In is a 1995 American film directed by Fred Olen Ray.

== Plot ==
A girl inherits a drive-in movie theater.

== Cast ==
- Ashlie Rhey as Kim Taylor
- Richard Gabai as Brian Winston
- Ross Hagen as Harry
- Peter Spellos as Carl (credited as G. Gordon Bear)
- Roxanne Blaze as Carrie (credited as Sarah Bellomo)
- Rob Vogl as Bobby
- Steve Barkett as Sheriff Bloodstone
- Nikki Fritz as Susan
- Tom Shell as Tom
- George Cost as Daryl
- Michelle Bauer as Dyanne Lynn
- David F. Friedman as J.B. Winston
- Conrad Brooks as Oscar
- Gordon Mitchell as Goliath
- Hoke Howell as Attorney
- Fred Olen Ray as Randy Rocket (credited as Randy Rocket)
- Becky LeBeau as Candy (credited as Sharona Bonner)
- Tane McClure as Mandy

== Production ==
The film is said to have been shot in 6 days at Ray's house.

== Reception ==
Bikini Drive-In is considered part of 1980s trend to include drive-in in film. It also is said to exemplify "100 low-budget features, mostly soft-core porn, often with “Bikini” in the title, often straight to video" in Ray's production.
