= Witchcraft VI: The Devil's Mistress =

Witchcraft VI:The Devil's Mistress
- Directed by: Julie Davis
- Written by: Julie Davis; Peter E. Fleming
- Produced by: Jerry Feifer; Michael Feifer
- Starring: Jerry Spicer; Debra K. Beatty; Shannon McLeod
- Cinematography: Dennis Maloney
- Edited by: Tony Miller
- Distributed by: Simitar Entertainment (US, DVD)
- Release date: May 11, 1994
- Running time: 95 minutes
- Country: United States
- Language: English

Witchcraft VI: The Devil's Mistress (also known as Witchcraft 666) in a 1994 American supernatural horror film directed by Julie Davis and starring Jerry Spicer, Debra K. Beatty, and Shannon McLeod. The sixth film in the Witchcraft series, it was produced by Vista Street Entertainment and released by Troma Studios.

== Plot ==
After killer Jonathan Renquist lures virgins back to his house, he and his girlfriend, Cat drug them for an unknown purpose. Meanwhile, warlock/attorney William Spanner is recruited by LAPD Detectives Lutz and Garner to help stop a serial killer who uses black magic to assist in the killings. Spanner identifies Savatini as the most likely killer from a lineup of possible suspects, but there is little to hold him on. While Spanner prefers not to be further involved, but when Lutz and Garner are removed from the case, he takes a more active role in the investigation.

While Renquist finds a virgin for Savatini in Spanner's secretary, Diana, and identifies Spanner as the main threat to his plan.

Spanner's involvement in the case dovetails into a divorce case he has where is attempting to catch Mr. Savatini, his client's husband, cheating. Savatini is Satan's agent who must perform a ritual sacrifice during a solar eclipse to bring Satan to Earth. However, unknown to Spanner, his new client is Cat, who spikes his drink.

== Cast ==
- Jerry Spicer as William Spanner
- Kurt Alan as Det Lutz
- John E. Holiday as Det Garner
- Debra K. Beatty as Keli
- Bryan Nutter as Savatini
- Craig Stepp as Jonathan Renquist,
- Julie Davis as Waitress

== Continuity ==
The film makes the first appearance of Detectives Lutz and Garner, who become semi-regulars in the series. However, after this movie Lutz is played by a female actor. Spanner's girlfriend Keli returns from the previous movie, although she is played by a different actor. Spanner again moves into the starring role, after having a supporting role in the last series. As this is Lutz and Garner's first supernatural case, they are reluctant to believe Spanner's claims, but come to trust his theories more in later films. The film is proceeded by Witchcraft V: Dance with the Devil and followed by Witchcraft VII: Judgement Hour.

== Reception ==
While the AV Club found the direction of Julie Davis to be a plus and cites her attempts to elevate the film, the review stated she wasn't given much to work with. In Creature Feature, the film was given one out of five stars, stating that the movie is a major step down from the previous films in the series, degenerating into sexy melodrama. TV Guide found the film lacking, stating that "despite the woman director, the emphasis here is on cheap thrills of a sexual kind."
