= Witchcraft IV: The Virgin Heart =

- Directed by: James Merendino
- Written by: James Merendino; Michael Paul Girard
- Produced by: Jerry Feifer; Holly MacConkey
- Starring: Charles Solomon Jr; Julie Strain
- Cinematography: Kevin Morrisey
- Edited by: Tony Miller
- Music by: Miriam Cutler
- Distributed by: Simitar Entertainment (US, DVD)
- Release date: 1992
- Running time: 95 min.
- Country: United States
- Language: English

Witchcraft IV: The Virgin Heart is a 1992 American horror film directed by James Merendino and starring Charles Solomon Jr and Julie Strain. The fourth film in the Witchcraft series, it was followed by Witchcraft V: Dance with the Devil. Produced by Vista Street Entertainment, it was released by Troma Studios.

== Plot ==
Will Spanner is the son of a powerful warlock whose parents died. Spanner is reluctant to use his inherited powers, as he attempts to have a normal life as a defense attorney. Spanner is himself a powerful warlock, although he fears that the use of his powers will lead him to submit to his dark side.

Spanner defends Peter Wild, who is accused of killing his girlfriend, and after meeting and becoming enamored with Belladonna at a strip club, Spanner begins to investigate the case himself. The girlfriend was actually killed by a crazed killer with links to a music club. Belladonna also works at the music club, where musicians are selling their souls to club owner Santana in return for promised fame. Santana hides that he is the son of Satan. Santana is Belladonna's agent, and while she has not sold her soul, she is being held captive. Also assisting Spanner in his investigation is the sister of the accused killer, Lily Wild.

== Cast ==
- Charles Solomon as William Spanner
- Julie Strain as Belladonna
- Clive Pearson as Santana
- Lisa Jay Harrington as Lily Wild
- Jason O’Gulihur as Hal
- Erol Landis as Lieutenant Erol Munuz
- Orien Richman as Pete Wild

== Continuity ==
Spanner is now an attorney with a private practice. He mentions that his previous involvement with a case involving the supernatural was about three years ago. Spanner provides a voice-over narration, which is unique in the series. Witchcraft IV: The Virgin Heart is the last film in which Solomon portrays Spanner. He is played by Marklen Kennedy in Witchcraft V: Dance with the Devil, the next film in the series. The name of the club is Coven, which Spanner states he has heard of before. One character claims to have been Spanner's brother in a previous life, but this does not appear to have been followed up in later films.

== Production ==
Directed by James Merendino, written by Michael Paul Girand and Merendino. Released directly to video.

== Reception ==
TV Guide found the film neither sexy nor scary, but instead a pedestrian mystery that is badly scripted even by low-budget standards. AV Film club found the film to have many similarities with Blue Velvet and that it was a mix of film noir and horror, but noted that the dialogue was poorly written. For It's Man's Number, while fining Strain's inclusion a positive, but had little good else to say about the film, stating "There's no sign of competence here in any department. Script and direction are awful, this is one ugly film in terms of the sheer murkiness of the visuals and audio, the acting is laughably bad at times, and it's impossible to care about the events." As of March 2018, the film has a 7% freshness rating on Rotten Tomatoes. In Creature Feature, the film was given three out of five stars.

== Home release ==
The film has been released on DVD.
