= Rachel Feldman =

American director and screenwriter

- Born: August 22, 1954 (age 71); New York City, New York, U.S.
- Other name: R.L. Tillmanns
- Occupations: Director, screenwriter
- Years active: 1980–present
- Spouse(s): Carl Tillmanns (2 children)

Rachel Feldman (born August 22, 1954) is an American director of film and television and screenwriter of television films.

== Life and career ==
Born in New York City, New York, Feldman began her career as a child actor performing extensively in commercials and television series.

Her credits as a television director include: The Rookie, Criminal Minds, Blue Bloods, The Baxters, and some beloved shows like Doogie Howser, M.D., The Commish, Dr. Quinn, Medicine Woman, Picket Fences, Sisters, and Lizzie McGuire, at the start of her career.

She has written and directed several long form movies and a recent feature film including: Witchcraft III: The Kiss of Death (1991), Post Modern Romance (1993), She's No Angel (2001) starring Tracey Gold, Recipe for a Perfect Christmas (2005) starring Christine Baranski, Love Notes (2007) starring Laura Leighton, and Lilly (2023) starring Patricia Clarkson.

== Films ==
=== Feature films ===
- Lilly (2024) - Director/Writer
- Love Notes (2007) - Writer
- Recipe for a Perfect Christmas (2005) - Writer
- She's No Angel (2001) - Writer/Director
- Witchcraft III: The Kiss of Death (1991) - Director

=== Shorts ===
- Here Now (2017) - Writer/Director
- Happy Sad Happy (2014) - Writer/Director
- Post Modern Romance (1993) - Writer/Director
- Wunderkind (1984) - Writer/Director
- Guistina (1981) - Writer/Director

== Activism ==
Feldman is active in the fight for gender equality in the film and television industry. Her activism takes form in speaking out about issues such as equal pay, job stability for women, sexual harassment, sexual discrimination and female representation within the industry. Feldman is also an activist for women behind the camera, who can be seen in the Geena Davis produced documentary This Changes Everything.

Feldman was the former chair of the DGA Women's Steering Committee (WSC). The focus of the WSC is to support and uplift women in the film and television industry.

== Personal life and education ==
Feldman grew up in the Bronx and now lives in Los Angeles. She attended New York University where she received a Master of Fine Arts Degree and has taught classes in directing and screenwriting at the USC School of Cinematic Arts.

Feldman is married to artisan contractor and colorist Carl Tillmanns; together they have two children, Nora and Leon. They are both alumni of Sarah Lawrence College, where they first met.
