= Witchcraft (1988 film) =

1988 film by Rob Spera

- DVD cover
- Directed by: Rob Spera
- Written by: Jody Savin
- Produced by: Jerry Feifer; Yoram Barzilai
- Starring: Anat Topol; Gary Sloan; Mary Shelley
- Cinematography: Jens Sturup
- Edited by: Tony Miller
- Music by: Randy Miller
- Distributed by: Simitar Entertainment (USA, DVD)
- Release dates: November 1988 (United Kingdom); March 2, 1989 (United States)
- Running time: 86 minutes
- Country: United States
- Language: English

Witchcraft (also known as Witch and Warlock) is a 1988 American supernatural horror film directed by Rob Spera and starring Anat Topol, Gary Sloan, Mary Shelley, Elizabeth Stocton, Deborah Scott, Alexander Kirkwood, Lee Kissman and Ross Newton. The screenplay was written by Jody Savin. It is the first film in the Witchcraft series, followed by Witchcraft II: The Temptress.

== Plot ==
As Grace Churchill is having her baby, disturbing visions flash in her mind that show two witches being burned at the stake. It is later learned that these two people are John and Elizabeth Stockwell, who were burned in the year 1687. The visions seem to stop once her baby, whom she names William, is born.

However, things get worse when Grace and her husband temporarily move into her mother-in-law’s creepy old house with their baby. It is here that the visions start to return, and all manner of unsettling events begin to unfold, including a priest hanging himself in their backyard. Grace discovers that the two witches she saw burned at the stake are her husband and mother-in-law, and they claim William as theirs. The two attempt to kill Grace in a Satanic ritual, but they are killed by their mute butler, leaving Grace to save William.

== Cast ==
- Anat Topol as Grace Churchill
- Gary Sloan as John Stockton / John Stockwell
- Mary Shelley as Elizabeth Stockton / Elizabeth Stockwell
- Deborah Scott as Linda
- Alexander Kirkwood as Priest
- Lee Kissman as Ellsworth
- Ross Newton as William

== Reception ==
Although Witchcraft was unsuccessful in theaters, it became the first in the successful Witchcraft series of direct-to-video films. In reviewing the entire series, The A.V. Club called the film a ripoff of Rosemary's Baby, but also called it the best film in the entire series. John Stanley in his Creature Feature book gave the movie two out of five stars.

== Home media ==
The film was released on video in 1988, and re-released October 15, 1997, on DVD.

== See also ==
- List of films about witchcraft
