= Deborah Spera =

American television producer

- Born: United States
- Occupation: Film producer

Deborah Spera is an American television producer.

== Career ==
She began her career at Eden Roc Films, where she worked on What's Eating Gilbert Grape and From Dusk till Dawn. Spera spent eight years at Showtime, where she oversaw movies such as The Baby Dance (written and directed by Jane Anderson), Wild Iris, 12 Angry Men, Inherit the Wind, On the Beach and Freak City, and executive-produced the movie Fathers and Sons.

Prior to her tenure at Showtime, she was in features at Regency Films and worked on Guilty by Suspicion, JFK, Free Willy, Under Siege and Sommersby.

Spera began the television arm of the Mark Gordon Company in 2004 and served as President until 2011. During her tenure with Mark Gordon she served as Executive Producer on Criminal Minds, Criminal Minds: Suspect Behavior, Reaper and the Lifetime series Army Wives until she left in 2011 to form her own company, One-Two Punch Productions.

Spera served as Executive Producer on the first season of MTV's Finding Carter.

Call Your Daughter Home is her first novel.

== Other credits ==
Witchcraft (1988 film) LAX, Deacons for Defense, Conviction, Run the Wild Fields, Hard Science, Power and Beauty, 10,000 Black Men Named George and Criminal Minds.
