= Witchcraft III: The Kiss of Death =

- Directed by: Rachel Feldman
- Written by: Jerry Daly
- Produced by: Jerry Feifer; Holly MacConkey
- Starring: Charles Solomon Jr; Dominic Luciana; Nicole Lauren
- Cinematography: John Thomas
- Edited by: Tony Miller
- Music by: Miriam Cutler
- Distributed by: Simitar Entertainment (US, DVD)
- Release date: 1991
- Running time: 95 minutes
- Country: United States
- Language: English

Witchcraft III: The Kiss of Death is a 1991 American horror film directed by Rachel Feldman and starring Charles Solomon Jr, Dominic Luciana, and Nicole Lauren. It is the third film in the Witchcraft series. The film was distributed by Troma Studios and produced by Vista Street Entertainment. It is followed by Witchcraft IV: The Virgin Heart.

== Plot ==
William Spanner (Charles Solomon) is now an adult and working as an assistant district attorney, determined to have a normal life and rejecting his magical heritage. His newest client is Ruben Carter (Ahmad Reese), an African-American teen, who stands accused of raping and murdering the divorcee for whom he did odd jobs. According to the prosecuting attorney, Vivian Hill (Nicole Lauren), the state has an open and shut case. Ruben's fingerprints are all over the victim's house, and the medical examiner has found proof of a sexual relationship between Ruben and the dead woman. Spanner's girlfriend Charlotte (Lisa Toothman) is being seduced by evil club owner Louis (Domonic Luciana), who uses his demonic powers to turn women into his slaves. Reverend Jondular (William L. Baker) is a witch doctor who helps Spanner use his powers.

== Cast ==
- Dominic Luciana as Louis
- Charles Solomon as William Spanner
- Ahmad Reese as Ruben Carter
- Nicole Lauren as Vivian Hill
- William L. Baker as Reverend Jondular
- Alexa Jago as Marlena
- Lisa Toothman as Charlotte

== Production ==
Witchcraft III: The Kiss of Death was directed by Rachael Feldman and written by Jerry Daly. The film received an "R" rating. It was a straight to video release.

== Continuity ==
William Spanner (who also used the last names Adams and Churchill in the first two films) is the only character from the first two films. He has apparently completed law school since he was last seen in Witchcraft II as a teen. It is noted that Spanner seems to have an increased intelligence level from the previous film. The next film in the series is Witchcraft 4: The Virgin Heart. The film established the basic plot for many of the following films, with Spanner appearing as a reluctant hero fighting mystical forces of evil.

== Reception ==
TV Guide advises viewers not to get their hopes up, and gives the film one star. 1000 Misspent Hours found the film to have enough good ideas for a decent 44 minute TV show, but found it to be hopelessly padded, with poor acting and rather boring love scenes. The Daily Grindhouse found the film an improvement over the prior film, but found the special effects very lacking. As of March 2018, the film holds a 1.9 out of 5 rating at Rotten Tomatoes. In Creature Feature, the film was given three out of five stars, stating that it is a big improvement over the previous two, and that writer R. L. Tillman and Director Gerry Daly inject interesting ideas and make the most of their low budget.

== Home release ==
The film is available on several streaming sites with age verification. It has been released on DVD.
