= Witchcraft (film series) =

American film series

- Production companies: Troma Studios (1–9); Armadillo Films (10); Tripod Films (13); David Sterling Productions (14–21)
- Distributed by: Academy Entertainment A-Pix Simitar Entertainment Troma Sterling Entertainment MakeFlix
- Running time: 1,415 minutes (16 films)
- Countries: United States; United Kingdom
- Language: English

Witchcraft is a horror film series, that as of July 2026, has 17 direct to video installments, making it one of the horror genre's longest-running interconnected series. It began in 1988, and most films focus, at least partially, on the character of William Spanner, who is a powerful warlock who fights for good despite having an evil lineage.

In June 2025, it was announced that Dustin Ferguson would be directing a 17th installment.

A 40th Anniversary trilogy was announced in 2026, with the first two films - Witchcraft XIX: Our Father and Witchcraft XX: 40 Years Later - filmed in Wisconsin in July 2026. The third film, Witchcraft XXI: Brotherhood of Saints, brought several actors back from earlier franchise entries. All three films were written and directed by Jason Paul Collum and Executive Produced by David S. Sterling. The cast, including scream queens Brinke Stevens (1982's The Slumber Party Massacre), Judith O'Dea (1968's Night of the Living Dead) and Tina Ona Paukstelis (What Happened to Dorothy Bell?), carried across all three films.

== Setting ==
=== Mythology ===
The series begins when Grace Churchill discovers her husband and mother-in-law's plan to use her newborn child, William, as a means to bring about the end of the world. The husband and mother-in-law are evil witches, who worship Satan. While Grace prevents this from happening, it is thought that only William and his mother survives the first film. In the second movie, 18 year old William, unaware of his heritage, and having been adopted by the Adams family, finds that his next door neighbor, the witch who survived from the first film, attempts to seduce him to use his powers for darkness. The Adams are white witches who had rejected the evil of the coven from the first film and stole William away.

William (with Spanner as his last name) resists the temptation, and in between the second and third movie, becomes a lawyer, getting a job in the district attorney's office. After being fired from the district attorney's office (a move which later movies reveal was caused by his black magic roots being discovered) he opens his own law office. Spanner resists his heritage, preferring a normal life, but events conspire to force him to use his powers, often with the fate of the world at stake. Spanner later becomes more comfortable with his powers and his role in protecting the world against the dark powers. Beginning in Witchcraft VI, Spanner often serves as an unofficial consultant for the Los Angeles Police Department, usually working with Detective Lutz and/or Garner.

While Spanner is the main character of the series, he is not in movies 8 and 10, and is only an infant in the first film. He dies at the end of the seventh movie, and remains dead during the eighth movie, but is resurrected in the ninth movie. He does not appear during the tenth movie, which is set in London, England and follows Lt. Lutz as she assist Interpol with a case, although he is referenced.

Keli is Spanner's Girlfriend in many of the movies, and they are engaged sometime between the tenth and the eleventh movie, but she disappears and is not referred to after the 11th movie.

The 14th–16th movies form a connected trilogy. The 16th film takes place in the "real" world, pokes fun of the film series recasting of the leads and the low budget nature of the series, using the actors from the 14th and 15th movie. The 16th movie explains that the entire series, and its oft recasting of the leads, is part of a careful plot by Satan to control the world.

== Films ==
Year	Film	Budget	Runtime
1988	Witchcraft	N/A	86 minutes
1990	Witchcraft II: The Temptress	$80,000	88 minutes
1991	Witchcraft III: The Kiss of Death	N/A	85 minutes
1992	Witchcraft IV: The Virgin Heart	N/A	95 minutes
1993	Witchcraft V: Dance with the Devil	$50,000	95 minutes
1994	Witchcraft VI: The Devil's Mistress	N/A	88 minutes
1995	Witchcraft VII: Judgement Hour	N/A	90 minutes
1996	Witchcraft VIII: Salem's Ghost	$48,000	90 minutes
1997	Witchcraft IX: Bitter Flesh	N/A	92 minutes
1998	Witchcraft X: Mistress of the Craft	$16,300	90 minutes
2000	Witchcraft XI: Sisters in Blood	$40,000	95 minutes
2002	Witchcraft XII: In the Lair of the Serpent	N/A	88 minutes
2008	Witchcraft XIII: Blood of the Chosen	N/A	89 minutes
2016	Witchcraft XIV: Angel of Death	$25,000	81 minutes
2016	Witchcraft XV: Blood Rose	$25,000	81 minutes
2016	Witchcraft XVI: Hollywood Coven	$25,000	82 minutes
2025	Witchcraft XVII: The Initiation	N/A	70 minutes
2026	Witchcraft XVIII: The Lanterne of Light	N/A	N/A
2027	Witchcraft XIX: Our Father	$25,000	93 minutes
2028	Witchcraft XX: 40 Years Later	$25,000	80 minutes
2028	Witchcraft XXI: Brotherhood of Saints	$20,000	N/A

== Cast and crew ==
=== Principal cast ===
List indicator

- A dark grey cell indicates the character was not in the film.

Character	Film															
Character	Witchcraft	The Temptress	The Kiss of Death	The Virgin Heart	Dance with the Devil	The Devil's Mistress	Judgement Hour	Salem's Ghost	Bitter Flesh	Mistress of the Craft	Sisters in Blood	In the Lair of the Serpent	Blood of the Chosen	Angel of Death	Blood Rose	Hollywood Coven
Character	1988	1990	1991	1992	1993	1994	1995	1996	1997	1998	2000	2002	2008	2016		
William Spanner	Ross Newton	Charles Solomon Jr.	Charles Solomon Jr.	Charles Solomon Jr.	Marklen Kennedy	Jerry Spicer	David Bynres		David Bynres		James Servais	Chip James	Tim Wrobel	H. Ryan Cleary	H. Ryan Cleary	H. Ryan Cleary
Keli Jordan					Carolyn Taye-Loren	Debra Beatty	April Breneman		Kourtine Ballentine		Wendy Blair					
Detective Garner						Enrique Galante	John Cragen		Mikul Roberts		Mikul Roberts			Leroy Castanon	Leroy Castanon	Leroy Castanon
Detective Lutz						John E. Holiday	Alisa Christensen		Stephanie Beaton	Stephanie Beaton	Stephanie Beaton			Berna Roberts	Berna Roberts	Berna Roberts
Rose														Molly Daughtery	Molly Daughtery	Molly Daughtery
Sharon														Noël VanBrocklin	Noël VanBrocklin	Noël VanBrocklin
Tara														Zamra Dollskin	Zamra Dollskin	Zamra Dollskin

=== Crew ===
Film	Director	Writer(s)	Producers
Witchcraft	Rob Spera	Jody Savin	Jerry Feifer and Yoram Barzilai
The Temptress	Mark Woods	Jim Hanson and Sal Manna	Jerry Feifer, Megan Barnett and Renza Mizbani
The Kiss of Death	Rachel Feldman	Jerry Daly	Jerry Feifer and Holly MacConkey
The Virgin Heart	James Merendino	James Merendino and Micahel Paul Girard	Jerry Feifer and Holly MacConkey
Dance with the Devil	Talun Hsu	James Merendino and Steve Tymon	Jerry Feifer and Michael Feifer
The Devil's Mistress	Julie Davis	Julie Davis and Peter Fleming	Jerry Feifer and Michael Feifer
Judgement Hour	Michael Paul Girard	Jerry Feifer and Peter Fleming	Jerry Feifer and Michael Feifer
Salem's Ghost	Joseph John Barmettler	Joseph John Barmettler	Jerry Feifer and Michael Feifer
Bitter Flesh	Michael Paul Girard	Stephen Downing	Jerry Feifer and Michael Feifer
Mistress of the Craft	Elisar Cabrera	Elisar Cabrera	Jerry Feifer, Elisar Cabrera, Frank Scantori and Jon Blay
Sisters in Blood	Ron Ford	Ron Ford	Jerry Feifer, Paula Pointer-Ford and David S. Sterling
In the Lair of the Serpent	Brad Sykes	Brad Sykes	Jerry Feifer, David S. Sterling and Bryan Stoughton
Blood of the Chosen	Mel House	Jeffrey Wolinski and Michael Wolinski	Jerry Feifer and Shaun Fox
Angel of Death	David Palmieri	Keith Parker	Jerry Feifer, David Palmieri, Cindy Sanabria and David S. Sterling
Blood Rose	David Palmieri	Sean Abley	Jerry Feifer, David Palmieri, Cindy Sanabria and David S. Sterling
Hollywood Coven	David Palmieri	Sean Abley	Jerry Feifer, David Palmieri, Cindy Sanabria and David S. Sterling

== Production ==
=== Development ===
All movies have been produced by Vista Street Entertainment. The first 8 films in the series were released on VHS by Academy Entertainment. In later years, Troma Studios re-released films 1–9 on DVD. The series maintains an official YouTube channel with behind the scenes information and a Facebook page.

== Reception ==
Despite its longevity, the series is not well regarded, and the AV Club notes that the series "Witchcraft continually relies on the same stock story lines, most often involving a good warlock struggling against trashy temptresses sent by evil warlocks to seduce him to the dark side." Crave's series project states the series is "trashy ... straight-to-video schlock" and finds little use for the series other than as "notorious video store staples". "The first four movies had the pretense of a supernatural plot and an interconnected mythology, but after that, the series began to slump (or improve, depending on your point of view) in to blatant softcore pornography".

In Creature Feature, a review of the first six movies found much of the same, with the third movie being the best of the first six.

TV Guide states "It's hard to fathom why this cheap-looking, uninspired series has run so long. Perhaps video store buyers and their customers figure that any series with this many installments has to have something going for it. But they'd be wrong." In many of the movies in the series the acting is quite poor by reasonable standards, with the actors sometimes even stumbling over their lines. The sex scenes are often unrealistic and extremely - laughably - fake looking (intercourse movements will be taking place in scenes but in numerous shots you can plainly see the male actor wearing underwear and his genitals well over a foot away from those of the female).

Video Reviewer 22 Shots found that the first 4 movies has a small amount of low budget, cheesy charm, the rest of the series "went more exploitative and sleazy" and were only recommended for fans of ultra-low budget films.

== See also ==
- List of films about witchcraft
