= Witchcraft VIII: Salem's Ghost =

- Directed by: Joseph John Barmettler
- Written by: Joseph John Barmettler
- Starring: Lee Grober; Kim Kopf; Tom Overmyer; David Weills; Anthoni Stewart; Jack van Landingham
- Music by: Miriam Cutler
- Release date: 1996
- Running time: 90 minutes
- Country: United States
- Language: English
- Budget: $48,000

Witchcraft VIII: Salem's Ghost (also known as Salem's Ghost: Witchcraft) is a 1996 American horror film directed by Joseph John Barmettler and starring Lee Grober, Kim Kopf, Tom Overmyer, David Weills, Anthoni Stewart, and Jack van Landingham. The eighth film in the Witchcraft horror film series, it was made by Vista Street Entertainment and released by Troma Studios.

== Plot ==
In a flashback to 1692, a warlock in Salem, Mass. is executed.

In the present day, married couple Sonny (Lee Grober) and Mary Ann Dunaway (Kim Kopf), who have relocated to Massachusetts after an affair that nearly drove them apart. Neighbors Mitch (David Wells) and Gayle (Anthoni Stewart) welcome the new couple, and when Mitch attempts to help stop a leak in the basement, he unearths the warlock's tomb and is possessed by evil.

The now evil Mitch attempts to convert more people to his side, but is stopped by a priest.

== Continuity ==
Witchcraft VIII: Salem's Ghost is a major departure from the first seven and all following films. Rather than reviving the Will Spanner character (who died in Witchcraft VII: Judgement Hour, but was brought back from the dead in Witchcraft IX: Bitter Flesh), Vista Street chose to make a stand-alone chapter of the series which would spawn a saga revolved around Salem's Ghost. However, the series never materialised. The home in the movie appears to be the home from Witchcraft V, and if so is the only link to the other movies.

== Reviews ==
AV Film club found the film fun, but had issues with the special effects. Response to the film was very negative. Director/writer Joseph John Barmettler quoted the film, saying: "It's a movie that really didn't need to get made."

== Production ==
Filmed under the title "Salem's Ghost" in 1994, the film was actually shot before the seventh Witchcraft film. However, it did not perform well, so the producers retitled it "Witchcraft 8" and released it the year after part 7. The film was shot in ten days on a budget of about $48,000. Actress and musician Tané McClure was originally cast as Gayle Baker, but dropped out the day before filming after booking a higher paying gig. The producers recast the role with Anthoni Stewart, whose voice they hated so much they dubbed it in post-production.

== Home release ==
The film was released on DVD.
