= Witchcraft IX: Bitter Flesh =

- Directed by: Michael Paul Girard
- Written by: Stephen Downing
- Starring: Landon Hall; David Byrnes; Julius Antonio
- Release date: 1997
- Country: United States
- Language: English

Witchcraft IX: Bitter Flesh is a 1997 American horror film directed by Michael Paul Girard and starring Landon Hall, David Byrnes, and Julius Antonio. The film is the ninth in the Witchcraft series.

== Plot ==
The ghost of William Spanner (David Byrnes) searches for anyone who can communicate with him. He finds Sheila (Landon Hall), a woman who gained psychic powers after a car accident. Spanner needs to ward girlfriend Keli (Kourtine Ballentine) that the person she is living with is an impostor.

Meanwhile, Los Angeles Police Department detectives Lutz (Stephanie Beaton) and Garner (Mikul Robins) realizes they don't have an ordinary serial killer on its hands when they uncover a series of murders involving beautiful young women with bodies partially eaten. When a hooker is brought in telling tales of evil warlocks and witches, the police officers begin to suspect the killer is not just psychotic but supernatural hooded man.

Lutz, Garner, and Will-in-Sheila's-body converge on the apartment building as the hooded man and fake Will prepare to do something horrible to Keli

== Continuity ==
The film picks up directly after Witchcraft VII: Judgement Hour, the eighth film in the series, Witchcraft VIII: Salem's Ghost is a stand alone film. Detectives Lutz and Garner, Spanner and Keli return to the series after being absent from the previous film in the series.

== Reception ==
The AV Club found that the film is where things really start to go downhill.
