= Witchcraft XI: Sisters in Blood =

- Directed by: Ron Ford
- Written by: Ron Ford
- Produced by: Jerry Feifer; Paula Pointer-Ford; David S. Sterling
- Starring: Miranda O'dell; Lauren Ian Richards; James Servais
- Cinematography: Scott Spears
- Edited by: Brad Jacques
- Music by: Larry Washington
- Release date: 2000
- Running time: 95 min
- Country: United States
- Language: English

Witchcraft XI: Sisters in Blood is a 2000 American horror film directed by Ron Ford and starring Miranda O'dell, Lauren Ian Richards, and James Servais. The eleventh film in the Witchcraft series, it was produced by Vista Street Entertainment. The film is followed by Witchcraft XII: In the Lair of the Serpent.

== Plot ==
As an exercise in their acting class, Catholic college students Colleen (Miranda Odell), Keri (Kathleen St. Lawrence) and Maria (Lauren Ian Richard) agree to complete a ritual which they think is fake to conjure up a demon. The idea is to “get into character” as a method acting exercise for the school production of Macbeth. Unknown to Colleen and Maria, the director, Professor Ramsden (Don Donason) and Keri are actually Satanist determined to resurrect the spirits of three dead witches, the Sinobia sisters, through this ritual and place the spirits into the young students' bodies. Maria is the first to be possessed, and then begins a murder spree. She is looking for the stone key which the sisters had, 300 years ago, built as portal for the demon Abaddon to enter the world. Abadon is Satan's general.

Once possessed by one of the 300 year dead witches, Maria lures a frat boy to the cemetery where the ritual was performed and kills him. The murder attracts the attention of LAPD Detectives Lutz and Garner, who handle odd murders for their department. After managing to throw the detectives off the case, Maria causes Keri to be possessed, and together they kill a priest, who refuses to help in the search for the stone key.

Good warlock Will Spanner gets involved, as he is now engaged to long time girl friend Kelly (spelled Keli in the previous movies), the sister of Colleen. Using his powers to detect the rising evil on the campus, Spanner does some detective work and manages to discover that the Sinobia sisters have possessed the three actresses. As the sisters have no further use for the director, they sacrifice him to speed Abadon's arrival

One of the nuns of the school holds the literal key to the hell, the stone key possessed Maria was looking for. Spanner receives help from Sister Seraphina (Anita Page), but the witches kill Sister Seraphina to obtain the key. Due to the rising death toll, the campus is evacuated. Colleen is then possessed, giving the witches the additional body they need to open the portal to hell.

Lutz, Garner, Keli and Spanner follow the three witches back into the cemetery, where the four are separated and attacked. Abadon attempts to seduce Will to the dark side, but with the help of Garner and Lutz he is able to save the Earth and just barely prevent Satan's return.

== Cast ==
- Miranda O'dell as Colleen
- Don Donason as Professor Ramsden/Abadon
- James Servais as William Spanner
- Wendy Blair as Kelly
- Stephanie Beaton as Detective Lucy Lutz
- Mikul Robins as Detective Garner
- Anita Page as Sister Seraphina
- Kathleen St. Lawrence as Keri
- Lauren Ian Richard as Maria

== Continuity ==
Detectives Lutz and Garner return from the ninth and tenth Witchcraft films. Spanner returns for his tenth appearance in the series. The AV Club commended the film for incorporating elements from the earlier films into the plot, which indicated a certain earnestness. Keli (spelled Kelly in the credits) has gotten engaged to William Spanner, who explains his origin and powers to her.

== Production ==
The film was directed and written by Ron Ford.

== Reception ==
Joe Bob Briggs gave the film 2 and a half stars. Entertainment Weekly gave the film a D−. The AV Club found the film so amateurish in acting and production value it barely warrant mention, but commended the film for incorporating elements from the earlier films into the plot, which indicated a certain earnestness. The series project found this to be one of the top movies in the series.
