= Witchcraft V: Dance with the Devil =

- Directed by: Talun Hsu
- Written by: James Merendino; Steve Tymon
- Produced by: Jerry Feifer; Drew Peloso; Michael Feifer
- Starring: Marklen Kennedy; Carolyn Taye-Loren; David Huffman
- Cinematography: Dennis Maloney
- Edited by: Tony Miller
- Music by: Miriam Cutler
- Distributed by: Simitar Entertainment (US, DVD)
- Release date: 1993
- Running time: 95 min.
- Country: United States
- Language: English

Witchcraft V: Dance with the Devil is a 1993 American direct-to-video horror film directed by Talun Hsu and starring Marklen Kennedy, Carolyn Taye-Loren, and David Huffman. The fifth film in the Witchcraft series, followed by Witchcraft VI: The Devil's Mistress. It was produced by Vista Street Entertainment and released by Troma Studios.

== Plot ==
Marta and her boyfriend Bill, run a scam were Marta lures an unsuspecting "date" back to her motel room where Bill then knocks the date out and they loot the victim. This time, however, the caper goes awry, and the victim was killed. Upset at the circumstances, and with the body in the trunk, Bill hits a homeless person and almost gets into a wreck with televangelist Reverend Meredith.

While the Reverend tries to help the homeless man, a mystic forces goes from the homeless man into the preacher, altering the preacher, who now shows much more interest in his secretary.

Marta and Bill bury the dead victim in the countryside, and with their car now inoperable, stumble into the campsite of Cain, who calls himself collector. After trying to run their scam on Cain, Cain turns the tables on them and uses his mystic sword to control Marta, ordering her to kill Bill, with which she complies. Cain reveals himself to be the agent of Satan.

Warlock/attorney hero William Spanner from Witchcraft 2-4 and his girlfriend Keli are out on a date when Keli is hypnotized by the club's DJ, who is Cain. Cain sensing Spanner's power, tricks him to go onstage and implants a post hypnotic suggestion in Spanner. Cain wants to use Spanner's powers to speed up his plan to bring Satan to Earth.

With Spanner acting very out of character, Keli contacts Reverend Meredith, who immediately brings in white witch Anastasia. Anastasia casts a spell of protection on Spanner, but Marta, who has been nightly seducing and ravishing William, kills Anastasia.

Keli goes searching for William at Cain's club and is attacked by Marta. Cain is about to sacrifice her when William appears, bearing Reverend Meredith. William fights off Cain's influence and engages the villain in a duel. In the process, both Cain and Marta are killed, and William and Keli are reunited.

== Cast ==
- Marta Nicole Sassaman as Marta
- Bill Freddy Andreiuci as Bill
- Lenny Rose as Reverend Meredith
- David Huffman as Cain
- Marklen Kennedy as William Spanner
- Carolyn Taye-Loren as Keli
- Aysha Hauer as Astasia

== Continuity ==
William Spanner's role is greatly reduced from the previous three movies from hero to victim. Footage of the witch burning from the first movie is used.

== Reception ==
1000 misspent hours notes that while noting the movie veers close to soft-core porn, notes the story is better than the previous two movies. AV club found the movie very over-the-top, and states that Huffman's campy performance makes this one a hoot TV Guide finds the film a reflection of the series as a whole with low production values, poor scripting, uninspired direction and an ever-increasing reliance on bared breasts to arouse the audience.
