= Ashlie Rhey =

American actress and model (born 1961)

- Born: West Virginia
- Height: 5 ft 7 in (1.70 m)
- Website: ashlierhey.com

Ashlie Rhey is an American actress and model. She has appeared in many low to medium-budget feature films in many genres.

== Career ==
Rhey was born on August 17, 1961 in Wheeling, West Virginia, but grew up in Ohio. She began acting in films in 1990 after working as a model and returning to Hollywood, California, from Europe. Most of her film roles are 'nudity required' roles in B-movies and are released directly to DVD / Video or appear on cable television channels such as Showtime, Cinemax, and Playboy TV. She has also performed in sketch comedy at The Comedy Store, in the stage production of Nudist Colony Of The Dead and modeled underwater; she is P.A.D.I. certified.

Rhey is perhaps most well known for her starring role in Bikini Drive-In which was directed by Fred Olen Ray. In addition, she has appeared in 7 editions of Playboy Special Editions, as well as the movies Draculina, Femme Fatales and Celebrity Skin.

She continues to follow her lifelong passion for comedic performance by producing her online web series sitcom Daisy Power and her stand up comedy.
