= Simitar Entertainment =

American media company

- Type: Media company
- Industry: Media
- Founded: 1985; 41 years ago
- Founder: Mickey Elfenbein, Philip Kives
- Defunct: May 12, 2000; 26 years ago
- Fate: Bankruptcy
- Successor: Encore Software (Sereno Ventures, LLC)
- Headquarters: 5555 Pioneer Creek Drive, Maple Plain, Minnesota
- Key people: Mickey Elfenbein (Chairman); Ed Goetz (President); Mark Elfenbein (Vice President); Greg Glass (Director of Sales)
- Revenue: $40,000,000 (1999)
- Total assets: $19,570,059 (2000 bankruptcy)
- Subsidiaries: Pickwick Records

Simitar Entertainment, Inc. was an American media company that distributed music, videocassettes, DVDs, and computer software. It primarily specialized in compilation albums, special interest video, and urban media.

== History ==
In 1985, former K-Tel International executives Mickey Elfenbein (president/CEO) and Philip Kives (founder) departed from said company and founded Simitar Entertainment. The first film released by Simitar was the animated film Shinbone Alley, which retailed at $39.95, and a soundtrack album would be marketed through television commercials. In the meantime, the company acquired Pickwick Records. Overtime, the company became a longtime leader in the budget VHS market throughout the late 1980s and 1990s.

In 1986, Simitar Entertainment had reached a deal with the United States Hot Rod Association to promote Monster Madness. By 1987, Minnesota-based Wedding Information Services had inked an agreement with Simitar Entertainment, whereas Simitar would release several titles on videocassette to mass merchandise and their video stores. Reach Entertainment produced sports home video programs for Simitar.

In 1991, Simitar scored a hit with Desert Shield, a documentary on the Gulf War. On February 25, 1997, Simitar Entertainment released the six-part documentary series Hollywood Starlets, produced by Promotions Plus in cooperation with Orphen Enterprises, which primarily focused on B-movie actresses. By April 1997, Simitar was the first independent in the U.S. with DVD releases. On May 18, 1998, Simitar secured the rights to 14 Jackie Chan movies, and several Godzilla movies to bring it onto DVD release, under license from United Productions of America, which was the U.S. holder of the franchise at the time. In 1999, Simitar's revenues rose from $5 million to $40 million in just three years.

On March 9, 1999, Titan Sports, Inc., doing business as World Wrestling Federation (WWF), and its music publishing partner, The Cherry River Music Co., sued Simitar Entertainment for copyright infringement relating to WWF The Music, Vol. 3 and won. Subsequently, in 2000, Simitar folded due to problems in the music division; the company's total assets were $19,570,059, with debts of $25,556,878. Simitar auctioned off its assets later that year, including its film library, which sold to Brentwood Communications, Inc. (BCI) for $215,000. Ed Goetz and Greg Glass went to BCI to start a DVD division. In October/November 2003, BCI was purchased by Navarre Corporation. Naverre's assets have since been sold to Speed Commerce in 2012, then to WYNIT Distribution in 2014. Following the bankruptcy of WYNIT in 2017, Sereno Holdings acquired most of the company assets and relaunched Navarre Distribution as "Encore Software."

== Releases ==
- 5th Day of Peace, American Bullfighters 1 & 2
- Abraxas, Guardian of the Universe
- Anima Mundi
- Awesome Fire Engines
- Awesome Police Cars
- Awesome Rides
- Awesome Mining
- Awesome Airplanes
- Awesome Bridges
- Awesome Trains
- Awesome Big Rigs
- Awesome Road Construction
- Awesome Building Construction
- Awesome Diggers & Dozers
- Awesome Ships
- Awesome Space
- Awesome Junior Dragsters
- Awesome Race Cars
- Awesome Monster Trucks
- Awesome Motorcycles
- Awesome A.T.V.'s
- Awesome Farm Machinery
- Bleeders
- BMX Freestyle
- Body Armor
- The Boys Club
- Canyon Dreams: Tangerine Dream
- Canyon Dreams/Desert Vision/True North
- Car Funnies
- Cartel
- Cause of Death
- Christopher Crocodile and his Wonderful World
- The Christmas Light
- The Christmas Brigade
- Chronos
- Dead & Buried
- The Dude Gang
- Fearless Hyena
- Frankenhooker
- God Told Me To
- Godzilla, King of the Monsters!
- Godzilla's Revenge
- (Godzilla vs.) Monster Zero
- Godzilla vs. Mothra (DVD / VHS)
- Godzilla vs. the Smog Monster (VHS only)
- Grambling's White Tiger
- Greatest Hits (SWV album)
- The Hitchhiker's Guide to the Galaxy
- I Wanna be a Policeman
- Jets
- Jack Frost
- Jungle Boy
- Kamikaze in Colour
- Korean War in Colour
- Laurel & Hardy Classics
- Mind Meld
- Mob War
- Mr. Superinvisible Cat.#7984
- Mysteries of the Sphinx
- Mysterious Origins of Man
- Porsche
- The Real Untouchables
- Red Scorpion
- Rush Week
- Search and Destroy
- Serial Killers
- Sing a Long with Bugs Bunny
- Sing a Long with Daffy Duck
- Sing a Long with Popeye
- Sing a Long with Little Lulu
- Spplat Attack
- Strike Fighters
- Surgeon
- Story of Iran-Iraq
- The Railroad Modeler
- Terror of Mechagodzilla
- To Kill With Intrigue
- Top Gun: The Story Behind The Story
- Two Evil Eyes
- Vampires (VHS only)
- Venom
- Vitsie Video Sitter
- Voodoo
- Wings Of Thunder
- Witchcraft (film series)
- Werewolf
- Wheels of Thunder
- Women Unchained
