= Scarlet's Witch =

- Directed by: F.C.Rabbath
- Written by: F.C.Rabbath
- Produced by: F.C.Rabbath; Kimberly Cobb; Adam Bertocci
- Starring: Emily Pearse; Julie Moss; Avery Pohl; Callie Haskins; Carlie Nettles; Bill Kelly
- Cinematography: F.C.Rabbath
- Music by: Valentin Boomes; Oliver Carman; Ryan Taubert; Ivan Torrent
- Production company: F.C.Rabbath Creations
- Release date: December 2014
- Running time: 90 minutes
- Country: United States
- Language: English

Scarlet's Witch is a 2014 American thriller/fantasy theatrical film written/directed by F.C.Rabbath (Director of Listen, A Brilliant Monster, The Waiting). The story is based on a short film by the same writer/director made in 2007. The film stars Emily Pearse, Callie Haskins, Bill Kelly and Julie Moss.

The film premiered in 2014 at Silver Lake Theater in Hollywood, California, and was subsequently shown in theaters.

== Plot ==
Alienated by her peers as a young girl, Scarlet finds escape from her loneliness in the forest where she meets a mysterious witch. Scarlet refuses the offer of magic at first, but maintains the friendship into her college years. When her blossoming relationship with a handsome boy at school is threatened by another girl, Scarlet turns to her old friend and her sorcery to get what she wants. Will her newfound powers fulfill all her desires or destroy everything she has known and loved?

== Cast ==
- Emily Pearse as Scarlet
- Julie Moss as Witch
- Avery Pohl as Young Scarlet

== Critical reception ==
Film Threat strongly recommended the film. Tallahassee Reviews

Film selected early showing in the new UHD technology.

== See also ==
- List of films about witchcraft
