= List of films about witchcraft =

This is a list of films about witches and witchcraft.

== 0–9 ==
Title	Director	Year	Notes
47 Ronin	Carl Rinsch	2013	
7 Wise Dwarfs (Seven Wise Dwarfs)	Richard Lyford	1941	short animated
7 Dwarves – Men Alone in the Wood	Sven Unterwaldt	2004	
7 Dwarves: The Forest Is Not Enough	Sven Unterwaldt	2006	

== A ==
Title	Director	Year	Notes
A-Haunting We Will Go	Robert McKimson	1966	Looney Tunes cartoon
Aathma Bandhana	Srikanth Nahata	1992	
Abigail (Эбигейл)	Aleksandr Boguslavsky	2019	
The Addams Family	Conrad Vernon, Greg Tiernan	2019	
The Addams Family 2	Greg Tiernan, Conrad Vernon	2021	
Addams Family Reunion	Dave Payne	1998	direct-to-video
Addams Family Values	Barry Sonnenfeld	1993	
The Addams Family	Barry Sonnenfeld	1991	
All Cheerleaders Die	Lucky McKee, Chris Sivertson	2013	remake of 2001 film
All Cheerleaders Die	Lucky McKee, Chris Sivertson	2001	
All of Them Witches (Sobrenatural)	Daniel Gruener	1996	
Alone in the Dark II	Peter Scheerer, Michael Roesch	2008	
Amazons	Alejandro Sessa	1986	
The Amityville Asylum	Andrew Jones	2013	
Amityville Death House	Mark Polonia	2015	
Amityville Dollhouse	Steve White	1996	
The Amityville Terror	Michael Angelo	2016	
Un amore di strega	Angelo Longoni	2009	
Art of the Devil (Khon len khong)	Tanit Jitnukul	2004	
Art of the Devil 2 (Long khong)	Kongkiat Khomsiri, Pasith Buranajan	2005	
Art of the Devil 3 (Long khong 2)	Kongkiat Khomsiri, Art Thamthrakul	2008	
The Autopsy of Jane Doe	André Øvredal	2016	

== B ==
Title	Director	Year	Notes
Babes in the Woods	Burt Gillett	1932	Silly Symphony
Barbie as Rapunzel	Owen Hurley	2002	
Barbie of Swan Lake	Owen Hurley	2003	
Barroz: Guardian of D'Gama's Treasure (Barroz: Nidhi Kaakkum Bhootham)	Mohanlal	TBA	
Bayonetta: Bloody Fate (ベヨネッタ ブラッディフェイト)	Fuminori Kizaki	2013	anime
Beastly	Daniel Barnz	2011	
Beautiful Creatures	Richard LaGravenese	2013	
Beauty and the Beast	Gary Trousdale, Kirk Wise	1991	
Beauty and the Beast	Bill Condon	2017	
Beauty and the Beast: The Enchanted Christmas	Andy Knight	1997	
Bedknobs and Broomsticks	Robert Stevenson	1971	
The Bell Witch Haunting	Marissa Johnson	2013	
Bell, Book and Candle	Richard Quine	1958	
Belladonna of Sadness (Kanashimi no Beradonna)	Eiichi Yamamoto	1973	
Bewitched	Nora Ephron	2005	
Bewitched Bunny	Chuck Jones	1954	
The Beyond (...E tu vivrai nel terrore! L'aldilà)	Lucio Fulci	1981	
Bhairava Dweepam	Singeetam Srinivasa Rao	1994	
Big Fish	Tim Burton	2003	
The Black Cauldron	Ted Berman, Richard Rich	1985	
Black Sunday (La maschera del demonio)	Mario Bava	1960	
Blackbeard's Ghost	Robert Stevenson	1968	
Blair Witch	Adam Wingard	2016	
The Blair Witch Project	Daniel Myrick and Eduardo Sánchez	1999	
Blancanieves	Pablo Berger	2012	
Blanche Neige	Angelin Preljocaj	2009	
Bloodlands (Tokë Gjaku)	Steven Kastrissios	2017	
Blue Blood	Andrew Sinclair	1973	
Book of Shadows: Blair Witch 2	Joe Berlinger	2000	
Brave	Brenda Chapman, Mark Andrews, Steve Purcell	2012	
Broom-Stick Bunny	Chuck Jones	1956	
The Brotherhood of Satan	Bernard McEveety	1971	
The Brothers Grimm	Terry Gilliam	2005	
Burned at the Stake (The Coming)	Bert I. Gordon	1981	
Buy Now, Die Later (Death and Senses)	Randolph Longjas	2015	

== C ==
Title	Director	Year	Notes
The Candy House	Walter Lantz	1934	Short
Casper Meets Wendy	Sean McNamara	1998	
Cast a Deadly Spell	Martin Campbell	1991	
Charodei (Чародеи)	Konstantin Bromberg	1982	
The Chronicles of Narnia: Prince Caspian	Andrew Adamson	2008	
The Chronicles of Narnia: The Lion, the Witch and the Wardrobe	Andrew Adamson	2005	
The Chronicles of Narnia: The Voyage of the Dawn Treader	Michael Apted	2010	
The Circle (Cirkeln)	Levan Akin	2015	
The City of the Dead (Horror Hotel)	John Llewellyn Moxey	1960	
Charming	Ross Venokur	2018	
Clash of the Titans	Desmond Davis	1981	
Clash of the Titans	Louis Leterrier	2010	
Coal Black and de Sebben Dwarfs	Robert Clampett	1937	Merrie Melodies
Conan the Barbarian	John Milius	1982	
Conan the Barbarian	Marcus Nispel	2011	
Conan the Destroyer	Richard Fleischer	1984	
Conjurer	Clint Hutchison	2008	
The Conjuring	James Wan	2013	
The Conjuring: The Devil Made Me Do It	Michael Chaves	2021	
Coraline	Henry Selick	2009	
Coven	Mark Borchardt	1997	Short
The Coven	John Mackie	2015	
The Covenant	Renny Harlin	2006	
The Craft: Legacy	Zoe Lister-Jones	2020	
The Craft	Andrew Fleming	1996	
Crowhaven Farm	Walter Grauman	1970	TV movie
The Crucible (Les Sorcieres de Salem)	Raymond Rouleau	1957	After play by Arthur Miller
The Crucible	Nicholas Hytner	1996	Arthur Miller
Cry of the Banshee	Gordon Hessler	1970	
Curse III: Blood Sacrifice	Sean Barton	1990	
Curse of the Witching Tree	James Crow	2015	
The Cursed Ones	Nana Obiri Yeboah	2015	

== D ==
Title	Director	Year	Notes
Da Hip Hop Witch	Dale Resteghini	2000	
The Damned (Gallows Hill)	Víctor Garcia	2013	
The Dark Crystal	Jim Henson and Frank Oz	1982	
Dark Dungeons	L. Gabriel Gonda	2014	Short
Dark Shadows	Tim Burton	2012	
Darklands	Julian Richards	1997	
Daughters of Satan	Hollingsworth Morse	1972	
Day of Wrath (Vredens dag)	Carl Theodor Dreyer	1943	Danish
Deadtime Stories	Jeffrey Delman, Tom Savini	1986	
Death at Love House	E.W. Swackhamer	1976	TV movie
Death by Invitation	Ken Friedman	1971	
Deathstalker (El cazador de la muerte)	James Sbardellati	1983	
The Demon (Il demonio)	Brunello Rondi	1963	
The Devil's Rock	Paul Campion	2011	
The Devils	Ken Russell	1971	
The Devonsville Terror	Ulli Lommel	1983	
Doctor Strange in the Multiverse of Madness	Sam Raimi	2022	
Dolls	Stuart Gordon	1987	
Dorothy and the Witches of Oz	Leigh Scott	2012	
Double, Double, Toil and Trouble	Stuart Margolin	1993	TV movie
Drag Me to Hell	Sam Raimi	2009	
Drawing Down the Moon	Steven Patterson	1997	
Dungeons & Dragons	Courtney Solomon	2000	

== E ==
Title	Director	Year	Notes
Earwig and the Witch (Āya to Majo)	Gorō Miyazaki	2020	
Ek Thi Daayan	Kannan Iyer	2013	
Eko Eko Azaraku	Shimako Satō	1975	manga
Elvira: Mistress of the Dark	James Signorelli	1988	
Elvira's Haunted Hills	Sam Irvin	2001	
The Emperor's New Groove	Mark Dindal	2000	
Enchanted	Kevin Lima	2007	
The Enchanted Well (Le Puits fantastique)	Georges Méliès	1903	
End of the Wicked	Teco Benson	1999	
Epic Movie	Jason Friedberg, Aaron Seltzer	2007	
Eve's Bayou	Kasi Lemmons	1997	
The Evil Rises	Daniel Florenzano	2018	
Excalibur	John Boorman	1981	
Eye of the Devil (also known as 13)	J. Lee Thompson	1966	

== F ==
Title	Director	Year	Notes
Fantaghirò	Lamberto Bava	1991	
Fantaghirò 2	Lamberto Bava	1992	
Fantaghirò 3 (The Cave of the Golden Rose 3)	Lamberto Bava	1993	
Fantastic Beasts and Where to Find Them	David Yates	2016	
Fantastic Beasts: The Crimes of Grindelwald	David Yates	2018	
Fantastic Beasts: The Secrets of Dumbledore	David Yates	2022	
Fear Street Part One: 1994	Leigh Janiak	2021	
Fear Street Part Three: 1666	Leigh Janiak	2021	
Fear Street Part Two: 1978	Leigh Janiak	2021	
The Flying Sorceress	William Hanna, Joseph Barbera	1956	
Four Rooms	Quentin Tarantino, Allison Anders, Alexandre Rockwell	1995	Anthology film
Freeway II: Confessions of a Trickbaby	Matthew Bright	1999	
Full Circle	Donna Read	1993	Documentary

== G ==
Title	Director	Year	Notes
Genuine	Robert Wiene	1916	
Ghoul	Petr Jákl	2015	
Ghoulies	Luca Bercovici	1984	
Ghoulies	Luca Bercovici, Albert Band, John Carl Buechler, Jim Wynorski	1985-1994	film series
The Golden Compass	Chris Weitz	2007	
The Good Witch	Craig Pryce	2008–present	franchise
The Good Witch	Craig Pryce	2008	
The Great Movement (El Gran Movimiento)	Kiro Russo	2021	
Gretel & Hansel: A Grim Fairy Tale	Osgood Perkins	2020	
Grimm's Snow White	Rachel Goldenberg	2012	The Asylum
Guardians of Oz (Guardianes de Oz)	Alberto Mar	2015	

== H ==
Title	Director	Year	Notes
Hagazussa	Lukas Feigelfeld	2017	
Halloween III: Season of the Witch	Tommy Lee Wallace	1982	
The Halloween Tree	Mario Piluso	1993	
Halloweentown	Duwayne Dunham, Mary Lambert, Mark A.Z. Dippé, David S. Jackson	1998-2006	film series
Halloweentown	Duwayne Dunham	1998	
Halloweentown High	Mark A.Z. Dippé	2004	
Halloweentown II: Kalabar's Revenge	Mary Lambert	2001	
Hans Christian Andersen's The Little Mermaid (Anderusen Dōwa Ningyo Hime)	Tomoharu Katsumata	1975	
Hansel and Gretel (Hänsel und Gretel)	Walter Janssen	1954	
Hansel and Gretel	Tim Burton	1983	TV special
Hansel and Gretel	Gary J. Tunnicliffe	2002	
Hansel and Gretel	Anthony C. Ferrante	2013	The Asylum
Hansel & Gretel Get Baked (Hansel and Gretel & the 420 Witch)	Duane Journey	2013	
Hansel & Gretel: Witch Hunters	Tommy Wirkola	2013	
Hansel and Gretel: An Opera Fantasy	John Paul	1954	
Hansel vs. Gretel	Ben Demaree	2015	The Asylum
Happily Ever After	John Howley	1989	
Happily N'Ever After	Paul J. Bolger	2006	
Happily N'Ever After 2: Snow White—Another Bite @ the Apple	Steven E. Gordon, Boyd Kirkland	2009	
Harry Potter	Chris Columbus, Alfonso Cuarón, Mike Newell, David Yates	2001 -	film series
Haunted	Michael DeGaetano	1977	
A Haunting in Salem	Shane Van Dyke	2011	
Häxan (Witchcraft Through the Ages)	Benjamin Christensen	1922	
The Hearse	George Bowers (filmmaker)	1980	
Hereditary	Ari Aster	2018	
Hex	Leo Garen	1973	
Hexed	Fawn Veerasunthorn, Jason Hand	2026	
Ho Sakta Hai	Wilson Louis	2006	
The Hobbit	Rankin/Bass	1977	
The Hobbit: An Unexpected Journey	Peter Jackson	2012	
The Hobbit: The Desolation of Smaug	Peter Jackson	2013	
The Hobbit: The Battle of the Five Armies	Peter Jackson	2014	
Hocus Pocus	Kenny Ortega	1993	
Hocus Pocus 2	Anne Fletcher	2022	
Holidays	Kevin Smith, Gary Shore	2016	
Hoodwinked Too! Hood vs. Evil	Mike Disa	2011	
House of Salem	James Crow	2016	
House of the Black Death	Harold Daniels, Jerry Warren, Reginald Le Borg	1965	
The House of the Devil	Ti West	2009	
The House That Dripped Blood	Peter Duffell	1971	
The House That Would Not Die	John L. Moxey	1970	
The House with a Clock in Its Walls	Eli Roth	2018	
Howl's Moving Castle (Hauru no ugoku shiro)	Hayao Miyazaki	2004	
The Huntsman: Winter's War	Cedric Nicolas-Troyan	2016	
Hybrids	Tony Randel	2015	

== I ==
Title	Director	Year	Notes
I Am Not a Witch	Rungano Nyoni	2017	
I Married a Witch	René Clair	1942	
I Was a Swiss Banker	Thomas Imbach	2007	
In Fabric	Peter Strickland	2019	
The Incantation	Jude S. Walko	2018	
Inferno	Dario Argento	1980	
The Influence (La influencia)	Denis Rovira van Boekholt	2019	novel by Ramsey Campbell
The Initiation of Sarah	Stuart Gillard	2006	
The Initiation of Sarah	Robert Day	1978	
Into the Woods	Rob Marshall	2014	

== J ==
Title	Director	Year	Notes
Jack-O	Steve Latshaw	1995	
Journey Back to Oz	Hal Sutherland	1974	
The Juniper Tree (Einitréð)	Nietzchka Keene	1990	

== K ==
Title	Director	Year	Notes
The Kid Who Would Be King	Joe Cornish	2019	
Kiki's Delivery Service (Majo no takkyubin)	Hayao Miyazaki	1989	
Kiki's Delivery Service	Takashi Shimizu	2014	
Kill, Baby, Kill (Operazione paura)	Mario Bava	1966	
King Arthur: Legend of the Sword	Guy Ritchie	2017	
Kirikou and the Sorceress (Kirikou et la Sorcière) '	Michel Ocelot	1998	

== L ==
Title	Director	Year	Notes
The Last Unicorn	Arthur Rankin Jr., Jules Bass	1982	
The Last Witch Hunter	Breck Eisner	2015	
Left Bank	Pieter Van Hees	2008	
The Legend of the Christmas Witch (La Befana vien di notte)	Michele Soavi	2018	
Lilly the Witch: The Dragon and the Magic Book (Hexe Lilli: Der Drache und das magische Buch)	Stefan Ruzowitzky	2009	
Lilly the Witch: The Journey to Mandolan (Hexe Lilli: Die Reise nach Mandolan)	Harald Sicheritz	2011	
The Little Mermaid (Русалочка, Rusalochka)	Vladimir Bychkov	1976	
The Little Mermaid (Malá mořská víla)	Karel Kachyňa	1976	
The Little Mermaid (Русалочка, Rusalochka)	Ivan Aksenchuk	1968	
The Little Mermaid II: Return to the Sea	Jim Kammerud	2000	
The Little Mermaid	Ron Clements, John Musker	1989	
The Little Mermaid	Rob Marshall	2023	
Little Witch Academia (Ritoru Witchi Akademia)	Yoh Yoshinari	2013	anime
Little Witches	Jane Simpson	1996	
Look What's Happened to Rosemary's Baby	Sam O'Steen	1976	
The Lord of the Rings	Ralph Bakshi	1978	
The Lord of the Rings: The Fellowship of the Ring	Peter Jackson	2001	
The Lord of the Rings: The Two Towers	Peter Jackson	2002	
The Lord of the Rings: The Return of the King	Peter Jackson	2003	
The Lords of Salem	Rob Zombie	2012	
The Love Witch	Anna Biller	2016	

== M ==
Title	Director	Year	Notes
Macbeth	Justin Kurzel	2015	
The Magic Christmas Tree	Richard C. Parish	1964	
The Magic Sword	Walter R. Booth	1901	
Magic Tree House (Majikku Tsurī Hausu)	Hiroshi Nishikiori	2011	
Mahakaal	Shyam Ramsay, Tulsi Ramsay	1993	
Maleficent	Robert Stromberg	2014	
Mark of the Devil (Hexen bis aufs Blut gequält)	Michael Armstrong	1970	
Mark of the Devil Part II (Hexen geschändet und zu Tode gequält)	Adrian Hoven	1973	
Maria Leonora Teresa	Wenn V. Deramas	2014	
Mary and the Witch's Flower (Meari to Majo no Hana)	Hiromasa Yonebayashi	2017	
Masters of the Universe	Gary Goddard	1987	
The Mephisto Waltz	Paul Wendkos	1971	
Mercy	Matt Greenberg	2014	
Mia moglie è una strega	Castellano & Pipolo	1980	
The Midnight Hour	Jack Bender	1985	
Midnight Offerings	Rod Holcomb	1981	
Mirror Mirror	Tarsem Singh	2012	
Miss Leslie's Dolls	Joseph G. Prieto	1972	
Monster Brawl	Jesse Thomas Cook	2011	
Monster Family sau Happy Family	Holger Tappe	2017	
Monster Family 2	Holger Tappe	2021	
More Than a Miracle (C'era una volta...)	Francesco Rosi	1967	
Mother of Tears (La Terza madre)	Dario Argento	2007	
Motto! Ojamajo Doremi: Secret of the Frog Stone	Shigeyasu Yamauchi	2001	
Mulan	Niki Caro	2020	
The Mummy: Tomb of the Dragon Emperor	Rob Cohen	2008	
The Muppets' Wizard of Oz	Kirk R. Thatcher	2005	
My Brother the Pig	Erik Fleming	1999	
My Little Pony: The Movie	Michael Joens	1986	
Mystics in Bali (Leák)	H. Tjut Djalil	1981	

== N ==
Title	Director	Year	Notes
Nahuel and the Magic Book (Nahuel y el Libro Mágico)	Germán Acuña Delgadillo	2020	
The Naked Witch	Larry Buchanan, Claude Alexander	1961 (1964)	
The Name of the Rose	Jean-Jacques Annaud	1986	
Nanny McPhee	Kirk Jones	2005	
Nanny McPhee and the Big Bang	Susanna White	2010	
Neberte nám princeznú	Martin Hoffmeister	1981	
Necromancy	Bert I. Gordon	1972	
Necromania (Necromania: A Tale of Weird Love!)	Ed Wood	1971	
The NeverEnding Story II: The Next Chapter	George T. Miller	1990	
The New Adventures of Snow White (Grimms Märchen von lüsternen Pärchen)	Rolf Thiele	1969	
The New Mutants	Josh Boone	2020	
The Night of the Devils (La notte dei diavoli)	Giorgio Ferroni	1972	
Night of the Eagle	Sidney Hayers	1962	
The Night of the Witches (La Noche de los Brujos)	Amando de Ossorio	1974	
Nightbooks	David Yarovesky	2021	
The Nightmare Before Christmas	Tim Burton	1993	

== O ==
Title	Director	Year	Notes
Obeah!	F. Herrick Herrick	1935	
Ojamajo Doremi Sharp: The Movie (Eiga Ojamajo Doremi Shāpu)	Takuya Igarashi	2000	
The Old Ways	Christopher Alender	2020	
Oz the Great and Powerful	Sam Raimi	2013	

== P ==
Title	Director	Year	Notes
The Pale Door	Aaron B. Koontz	2020	
Papi Gudia	Lawrence D'Souza	1996	
Paranormal Activity: The Marked Ones	Christopher Landon	2014	
Paranormal Activity 3	Henry Joost, Ariel Schulman	2011	
Paranormal Activity 4	Henry Joost, Ariel Schulman	2012	
ParaNorman	Chris Butler, Sam Fell	2012	
Penelope	Mark Palansky	2006	
Percy Jackson: Sea of Monsters	Thor Freudenthal	2013	
Pirates of the Caribbean: Dead Man's Chest	Gore Verbinski	2006	
Pirates of the Caribbean: Dead Men Tell No Tales	Joachim Rønning, Espen Sandberg	2017	
The Pit and the Pendulum	Stuart Gordon	1991	
The Power of Fear (Vedma)	Oleg Fesenko	2006	
Practical Magic	Griffin Dunne	1998	
Practical Magic 2	Susanne Bier	2026	
A Praga (The Plague)	José Mojica Marins	1980	
Prince Valiant	Anthony Hickox	1997	
Princess Jasnenka and the Flying Shoemaker (O princezne Jasnence a létajícím sevci)	Zdeněk Troška	1987	
Puella Magi Madoka Magica: The Movie (Gekijōban Mahō Shōjo Madoka Magika)	Akiyuki Shinbo	2011	anime
Pufnstuf Zaps the World	Hollingsworth Morse	1970	
Pumpkinhead	Stan Winston	1988	
Pumpkinhead II: Blood Wings	Jeff Burr	1994	
Pumpkinhead: Ashes to Ashes	Jake West	2006	
Pumpkinhead: Blood Feud	Michael Hurst	2007	

== R ==
Title	Director	Year	Notes
Red One	Jake Kasdan	2024	
Red Shoes and the Seven Dwarfs (Redeu Syujeu)	Sung-ho Hong	2019	
The Resurrected (The Ancestor or Shatterbrain)	Dan O'Bannon	1991	
El Retorno de Walpurgis	Carlos Aured	1973	
Return to Halloweentown (Halloweentown 4)	David Jackson	2006	
Return to Oz	Walter Murch	1985	
The Ritual	David Bruckner	2017	
Robin Hood: Prince of Thieves	Kevin Reynolds	1991	
Room on the Broom	Max Lang, Jan Lachauer	2012	
Rose O'Salem-Town	D. W. Griffith	1910	
Rosemary's Baby	Roman Polanski	1968	
Rosemary's Baby	Agnieszka Holland	2014	miniseries
Rudolph the Red-Nosed Reindeer: The Movie	William R. Kowalchuk	1998	

== S ==
Title	Director	Year	Notes
Sabrina Down Under	Kenneth R. Koch	1999	TV movie
Sabrina Goes to Rome	Tibor Takács	1998	TV movie
Sabrina the Teenage Witch	Tibor Takács	1996	TV movie
Sabrina: Friends Forever	Scott Heming	2002	TV movie
Sacred Evil – A True Story (Gehra Paani)	Abhigyan Jha	2006	
Sacrilege	David Creed	2020	
Sally the Witch (Mahōtsukai Sarī)	Toshio Katsuta	1966	anime
Santana	Maradona Dias Dos Santos, Chris Roland	2020	
Satan's School for Girls	David Lowell Rich	1973	TV movie
Satan's School for Girls	Christopher Leitch	2000	TV movie
Satan's Slave	Norman J. Warren	1976	
Scarlet's Witch	F.C.Rabbath	2014	
Scary Godmother: Halloween Spooktakular	Ezekiel Norton	2003	
Scooby-Doo and the Ghoul School	Charles A. Nichols	1988	
Scooby-Doo! and the Reluctant Werewolf	Ray Patterson	1988	
Scooby-Doo! and the Goblin King	Joe Sichta	2008	
Scooby-Doo! and the Witch's Ghost	Jim Stenstrum	1999	
Season of the Witch (Hungry Wives)	George A. Romero	1972	
Season of the Witch	Dominic Sena	2011	
Secret Magic Control Agency (Hansel & Gretel)	Aleksey Tsitsilin	2021	
The Secret Village	Swamy M. Kandan	2013	
The Seven Dwarfs to the Rescue (I sette nani alla riscossa)	Paolo W. Tamburella	1951	
The Seventh Dwarf (Der 7bte Zwerg)	Harald Siepermann, Boris Aljinovic	2014	
The Seventh Seal (Det Sjunde inseglet)	Ingmar Bergman	1957	
Seventh Son	Sergei Bodrov	2014	
Severus Snape and the Marauders	Justin Zagri	2016	Short
The She Beast	Mike Reeves	1966	
Shiromajo Gakuen	Koichi Sakamoto	2013	
Shrek Forever After	Mike Mitchell	2010	
Shrek the Third	Raman Hui, Chris Miller	2007	
Silent Night, Deadly Night 4: Initiation	Brian Yuzna	1990	
	Charles Sellier, Jr., Lee Harry	1984–2012	film series
Simon, King of the Witches	Bruce Kessler	1971	
A Simple Wish (The Fairy Godmother)	Michael Ritchie	1997	
The Skeleton Key	Iain Softley	2005	
Sleepy Hollow	Tim Burton	1999	
The Snow Queen	Martin Gates	1995	
The Snow Queen	David Wu	2002	
The Snow Queen's Revenge	Martin Gates	1996	
Snow White		1902	
Snow White	J. Searle Dawley	1916	
Snow-White	Dave Fleischer	1933	
Snow White (Schneewittchen)		1962	
Snow White	Michael Berz	1987	
Snow White	Marc Webb	2025	
Snow White and the Huntsman	Rupert Sanders	2012	
Snow White and the Seven Dwarfs	David Hand	1937	
Snow White and the Seven Dwarfs (Schneewittchen und die 7 Zwerge)	Erich Kobler	1955	
Snow White and the Three Stooges	Walter Lang	1961	
Snow White: A Deadly Summer	David DeCoteau	2012	
A Snow White Christmas	Kay Wright	1980	animated television special
Snow White: A Tale of Terror	Michael Cohn	1997	
Snow White: The Fairest of Them All	Caroline Thompson	2001	
Snow White: The Sequel (Blanche-Neige, la suite)	Picha	2007	adult animated film
Sydney White	Joe Nussbaum	2007	
Solace in Wicca	Andy North	2013	Short
Something Weird	Herschell Gordon Lewis	1967	
Something Wicked This Way Comes	Jack Clayton	1983	
The Sorcerer's Apprentice	Jon Turteltaub	2010	
Spectre	Clive Donner	1977	
Spellbinder	Janet Greek	1988	
Spirited Away	Hayao Miyazaki	2001	
Stardust	Matthew Vaughn	2007	
Stranger in Our House	Wes Craven	1978	TV movie
La strega in amore	Damiano Damiani	1966	
Suicide Squad	David Ayer	2016	
Supergirl	Jeannot Szwarc	1984	
Superstition	James W. Roberson	1982	
Suspiria	Dario Argento	1977	
Suspiria	Luca Guadagnino	2018	
The Swan Princess	Richard Rich	1994	
The Sword in the Stone	Wolfgang Reitherman	1963	

== T ==
Title	Director	Year	Notes
Tale of Tales (Il racconto dei racconti)	Matteo Garrone	2015	
Tales from the Darkside: The Movie	John Harrison	1990	Anthology film
Tales from the Hood	Rusty Cundieff	1995	Anthology film
Tamara	Jeremy Haft	2005	
Teen Witch	Dorian Walker	1989	
Terror	Norman J. Warren	1978	
Thumbelina	Don Bluth, Gary Goldman	1994	
The Touch of Satan	Don Henderson	1971	
Tower of Terror	D. J. MacHale	1997	TV movie
Trick or Treat	Jack Hannah	1952	Short
Troll	John Carl Buechler	1986	
Troll 2	Claudio Fragasso	1990	
A Troll in Central Park	Don Bluth, Gary Goldman	1994	
Twitches	Stuart Gillard	2005	
Twitches Too	Stuart Gillard	2007	

== U ==
Title	Director	Year	Notes
The Uncanny	Denis Héroux	1977	Anthology film
The Undead	Roger Corman	1957	
The Unholy	Evan Spiliotopoulos	2021	

== V ==
Title	Director	Year	Notes
Vaa Arugil Vaa	Kalaivanan Kannadasan	1991	
Valerie and Her Week of Wonders (Valerie a týden divu)	Jaromil Jireš	1970	
Veneno para las hadas (Poison for the Fairies)	Carlos Enrique Taboada	1984	
Virgin Witch	Ray Austin	1972	
Les Visiteurs	Jean-Marie Poiré	1993	
Viy	Konstantin Yershov, Georgi Kropachyov	1967	
Viy (Forbidden Kingdom)	Oleg Stepchenko	2014	
Voldemort: Origins of the Heir	Gianmaria Pezzato	2018	

== W ==
Title	Director	Year	Notes
War Witch (Rebelle)	Kim Nguyen	2012	
Warlock	Steve Miner	1989	
Warlock III: The End of Innocence	Eric Freiser	1999	
Warlock Moon	Bill Herbert	1973	
Warlock: The Armageddon	Anthony Hickox	1993	
Weapons	Zach Cregger	2025	
The Werewolf	Henry MacRae	1913	Short
Whizzard of Ow	Bret Haaland	2003	Short
Wicked Stepmother	Larry Cohen	1989	
Wicked	Jon Chu	2024	Musical
Wicked: For Good	Jon Chu	2025	Musical
The Wicked	Peter Winther	2013	
Willow	Ron Howard	1988	
Wish	Chris Buck and Fawn Veerasunthorn	2023	
The Witch	Frank Powell	1916	
The Witch	Robert Eggers	2015	
The Witch (La Fée Carabosse ou le Poignard fatal)	Georges Méliès	1906	
Witch Hunt	Scott Hartford-Davis	1999	
Witch Story (Streghe)	Alessandro Capone	1989	
Witch Way Love (Un amour de sorcière)	René Manzor	1997	
The Witch (Noita palaa elämään)	Roland af Hällström	1952	
The Witch's Curse (Maciste all'inferno)	Riccardo Freda	1962	
A Witch's Tangled Hare	Abe Levitow	1959	Short
Witchcraft	Don Sharp	1964	
Witchcraft	Rob Spera	1988	
Witchcraft	Rob Spera, Mark Woods, Rachel Feldman	1988–2016	film series
Witchcraft II: The Temptress	Mark Woods	1990	
Witchcraft IX: Bitter Flesh	Michael Paul Girard	1997	
Witchcraft V: Dance with the Devil	Talun Hsu	1993	
Witchcraft VI: The Devil's Mistress (Witchcraft 666)	Julie Davis	1994	
Witchcraft VIII: Salem's Ghost (Salem's Ghost: Witchcraft)	Joseph John Barmettler	1996	
Witchcraft X: Mistress of the Craft	Elisar Cabrera	1998	
The Witches of Eastwick	George Miller	1987	
Witches of the Caribbean	David DeCoteau	2005	
The Witches	Cyril Frankel	1966	
The Witches (Le streghe)	Mauro Bolognini, Vittorio De Sica, Pier Paolo Pasolini, Franco Rossi, Luchino Visconti	1967	
The Witches	Nicolas Roeg	1990	
The Witches	Robert Zemeckis	2020	
Witches' Brew	Richard Shorr	1980	
The Witches Mountain (El monte de La brujas)	Raul Artigot	1972	
Witchfinder General (The Conqueror Worm)	Michael Reeves	1968	
Witchhammer (Kladivo na čarodějnice)	Otakar Vávra	1970	
Witching & Bitching (Las brujas de Zugarramurdi)	Álex de la Iglesia	2013	
Witchouse	David DeCoteau	1999	
Witchslayer Gretl	Mario Azzopardi	2012	
Witchtrap	Kevin Tenney	1989	
Witchville	Pearry Reginald Teo	2010	
Witchy Pretty Cure! The Movie: Wonderous! Cure Mofurun! (Eiga Mahōtsukai Purikyua!: Kiseki no Henshin! Kyua Mofurun)	Yuta Tanaka	2016	
The Wiz	Sidney Lumet	1978	
The Wizard of Oz	Victor Fleming	1939	
The Wizard of Oz (オズの魔法使い, Ozu no Mahōtsukai)	Fumihiko Takayama	1982	
The Woman Who Came Back	Walter Colmes	1945	
The Wonderful Wizard of Oz	Otis Turner (unconfirmed)	1910	
The Woods	Lucky McKee	2006	
The Worst Witch	Robert W. Young	1986	
The Wretched	Brett Pierce, Drew T. Pierce	2019	

== Y ==
Title	Director	Year	Notes
Yoddha the Warrior	Raj Chakraborty	1992	

== See also ==
- List of films about curses
