= Adrian Bustamante =

American actor

- Born: September 8, 1981 (age 45); Fremont, California, U.S.
- Occupation: Actor
- Website: adrianbustamante.com

Adrian Bustamante (born September 8, 1981) is an American film, commercial and television actor.

Bustamante started his career as an actor in 2008. His first significant role was in Trauma, a short lived show on NBC. He co-starred in the film Hansel & Gretel. On television, he had roles in The Bold and the Beautiful, The Young and the Restless and Nathan for You.

== Early life ==
Bustamante was born on September 8, 1981, in Fremont, California, the first child of Raul and Marie. Adrian's family moved to Antioch where he graduated from high school. When he was young, his parents got divorced but remained strong supporters throughout his life. Bustamante took acting classes through community colleges but nine years passed before he actively pursued his passion for acting as a profession.

== Career ==
After working in real estate for several years, Bustamante decided to become a full-time actor. He started his acting in San Francisco, California and got his first break as a major role in Trauma on NBC. Bustamante was working on various commercials whilst working on Trauma. He also worked in The Young and the Restless on CBS day-time soap. Nevertheless, he then worked for major networks on television shows like Don't Trust the B— in Apartment 23, Bustamante played a role of shocked busboy with one of the stars on this show, named Krysten Ritter. This episode was the sixth session of this season. Nathan for You, The Bold and the Beautiful, Dexter and various others.

Over the last few years, Bustamante is doing films as well which have been ventured by his time spent on television. Though his first love is for TV but not as strong as for film. Bustamante has been well known due to his work on multiple films, among which My Night with Andrew Cunanan is close to him as it has been screened for over 20 film festivals all over the world and very successful on the film festival circuit. This film was to be screened in 2013.

Bustamante worked on films such as Red Tails, Chasing Life, The Banshee Chapter, My Name Is Khan, My Politics, My Country, How Embarrassing, Hansel & Gretel and Dark Harvest.

In an interview with The Arts and Entertainment Magazine, Bustamante highlighted that it is true that he has not taken formal training for acting but he always tried to get better in his acting through self-teaching and watching videos online. Bustamante has appeared in commercials for Chase Bank, Nissan, SeaWorld, Sprite and Vehix. In "NYCastings", an article written by Kelly Calabrese about Audition Blunders, Bustamante emphasized that what he learned in auditions is, that an actor would be an immediate turn off if he comes with a lack of confidence therefore an actor should go in for auditions as comfortable and as confident as possible.

Bustamante also starred in the television documentary series, I (Almost) Got Away with It, directed by Ted Leonard. Bustamante played the lead role in one episode of William Van Poyck, a lifelong criminal who cannot stay out of jail.
