= Bertocci =

Bertocci is an Italian surname. Notable people with the surname include:

- Adam Bertocci (born 1982), American filmmaker.
- Aldo Bertocci (1915 – 2004), Italian operatic tenor.
- Peter Bertocci (1910–1989), American philosopher
