= Sacrilege (disambiguation) =

A sacrilege is the mistreatment of a sacred object.

Sacrilege may also refer to:

== Music ==
- Sacrilege (band), a punk band from England
- Sacrilege (album), an album by Can
- "Sacrilege" (song), a single by the Yeah Yeah Yeahs from Mosquito
- "Sacrilege", a song by AFI from Crash Love

== Other uses ==
- Devils of Monza or Sacrilege, a 1987 erotic drama film
- Sacrilege (2020 film), a British horror film
