= The Waiting (film) =

2020 American thriller/romance/horror film

- Directed by: F.C.Rabbath
- Written by: F.C.Rabbath
- Produced by: F.C.Rabbath; Jared Rush; Mark A. Marple; Sharon Collins; Adam Bertocci
- Starring: Nick Leali; Molly Ratermann; Laura Altair; Michelle Feliciano; Mark A. Marple; Alea Figueroa; Bill Kelly; Bryan Perritt
- Cinematography: F.C.Rabbath
- Music by: Valentin Boomes
- Production company: F.C.Rabbath Creations
- Release date: 2020
- Running time: 90 minutes
- Country: United States
- Language: English

The Waiting is a 2020 American romance/horror/comedy written/directed by F.C.Rabbath (Director of A Brilliant Monster). The film stars Nick Leali, Molly Ratermann, David Raizor, Bob Myers, Bill Kelly, Bryan Perritt, Laura Altair, Michelle Feliciano, and Mark A. Marple.

== Plot ==
Eric Brady, a new hotel employee stumbling upon an open secret. One of the rooms is haunted. Eric decides it's both his and the hotel's best interest to help remove the ghost. However, when he meets the ghost, everything changes.

== Cast/Crew ==
- Nick Leali as Eric
- Molly Ratermann as Elizabeth
- Laura Altair as Sally
- Bob Myers as Steve
- David Raizor as Sean Davis
- Mark A. Marple as Delacourt
- Michelle Feliciano as Michelle
- Emalie Noelani as Kayla
- Bryan Perritt as TV Host
- Assistant Directors Maxine Beck and Amalie Ostertag
- Production Coordinator Kayla King
- Key Make-Up Paris Gedeon

== Theatrical Release ==
Plays in theaters March 12, 2021. https://www.cmxcinemas.com/movies/The-Waiting

A 4/5 rating from the famous Starburst magazine. https://www.starburstmagazine.com/reviews/the-waiting

=== Critical reception ===
"The Waiting" Review - That Moment In

The Waiting - Review "Scariest Things"

Movie Reviews

Film Review

Review "The Waiting"
