= Dean Cain =

American actor (born 1966)

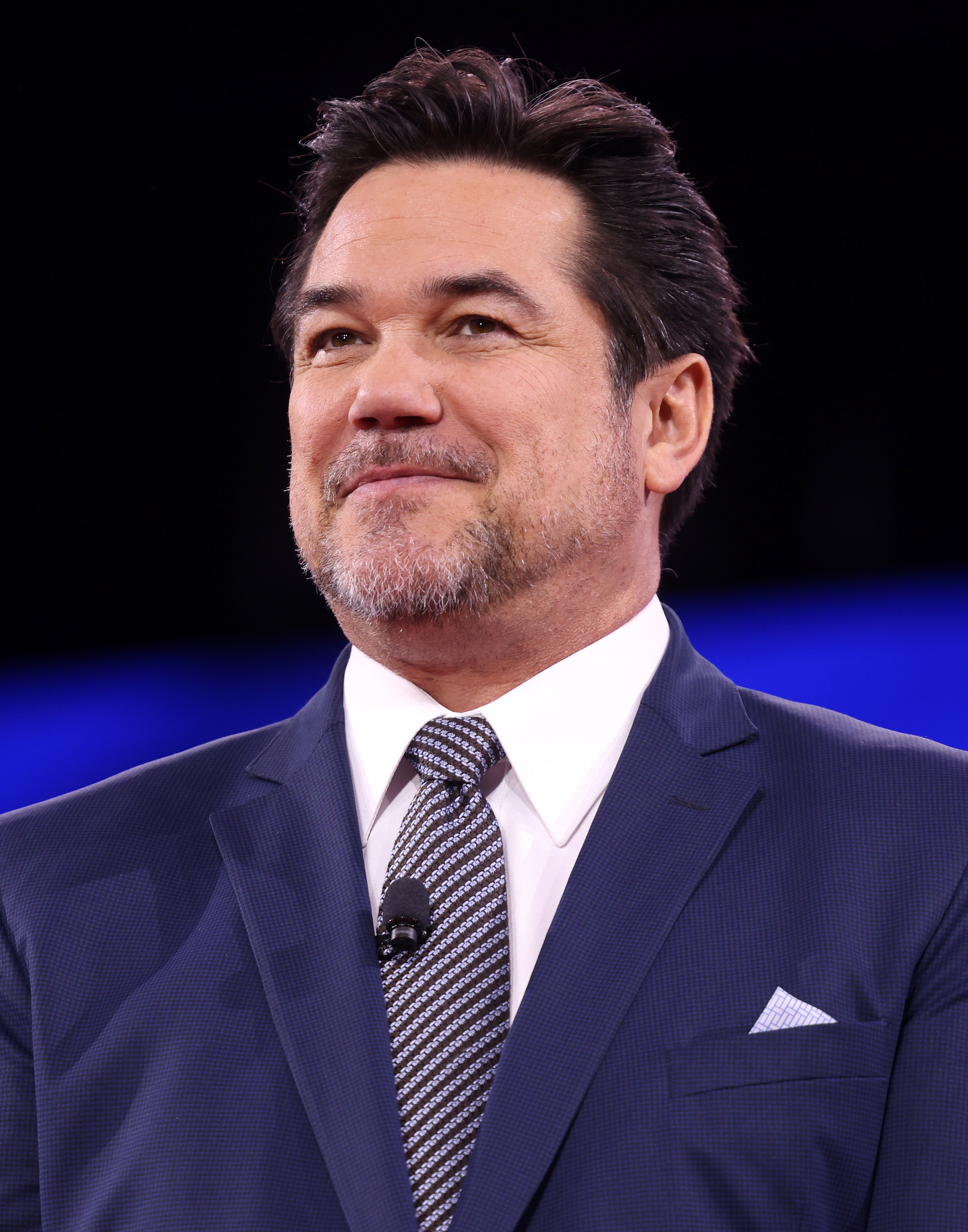
- Cain in 2025
- Born: Dean George Tanaka; July 31, 1966 (age 60); Harrison Township, Michigan, U.S.
- Education: Princeton University (BA)
- Occupations: Actor; producer; television host
- Years active: 1976–present
- Known for: Lois & Clark: The New Adventures of Superman; Ripley's Believe It or Not! Hit the Floor
- Children: 1
- Football career

No. 11
- Position: Free safety

Personal information
- Listed height: 6 ft 0 in (1.83 m)
- Listed weight: 180 lb (82 kg)

Career information
- High school: Santa Monica (Santa Monica, California)
- College: Princeton
- NFL draft: 1988: undrafted

Career history
- Buffalo Bills (1988)*
- * Offseason or practice squad member only

Awards and highlights
- Consensus I-AA All-American (1987); John P. Poe–Richard W. Kazmaier Jr. Football Trophy (1987)

Dean George Cain (né Tanaka; born July 31, 1966) is an American actor and ICE agent best known for portraying Superman in the 1990s television series Lois & Clark: The New Adventures of Superman. Cain was also the host of Ripley's Believe It or Not! and appeared in the sports drama series Hit the Floor.

== Early life ==
Dean George Tanaka was born on July 31, 1966, at Selfridge Air Force Base in Harrison Township, Michigan. His mother, Sharon Thomas, was an actress. Cain is mixed-race; his father, Roger Tanaka, was an American serviceman of Japanese descent, the son of John Megumi Tanaka and Miyoko Tanaka. Cain said that several members of his family were interned at the Minidoka War Relocation Center in Idaho as part of the internment of Japanese Americans. The rest of Cain's ancestry is Welsh, Irish, and French Canadian.

Cain said of his father, whom he never met, "He's not the kind of man I want to be. He was an unfaithful husband and not much of a father." Soon after Dean's birth, his mother, pursuing an acting career, moved him and his older brother Roger to Los Angeles. In 1969, Sharon married the film director Christopher Cain, who adopted her two sons, and Dean and Roger took their stepfather's surname. The couple moved to Malibu, California, and had a daughter, Krisinda.

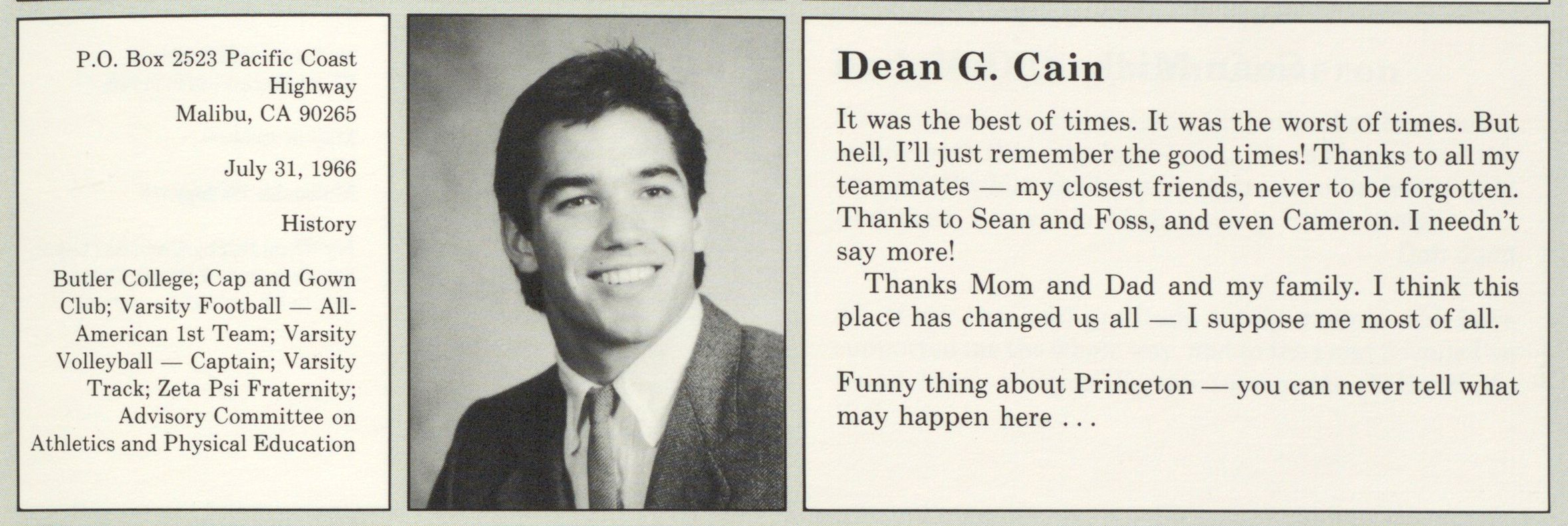
Cain in the Princeton University yearbook, 1986

Cain attended Santa Monica High School, where he excelled in sports. Among his schoolmates were Charlie Sheen, who played on the same baseball team as Cain when they were children, as well as Rob Lowe and his brother Chad. Cain graduated from high school in 1984 and attended Princeton University, where he majored in American history. He dated actress Brooke Shields, whom he met in a religion class at the university. Cain graduated in 1988 with a bachelor of arts in history. His senior thesis was "The History and Development of the Functions of the Academy of Motion Picture Arts and Sciences".

=== Football ===
At Princeton, Cain starred as a free safety on the football team. He began his career as a cornerback, making his first start during his sophomore year in 1985. In the season opener, he contributed to Princeton's 10–3 victory over Dartmouth by diving for an underthrown pass that would have resulted in a Dartmouth touchdown to record his first interception. Against Cornell in the final game of 1985, he intercepted Marty Stallone thrice to help the Tigers win 33–27. At the end of the season, he was an honorable mention on the All-Ivy League team. Cain switched to safety for 1986, a position he preferred since it had "a lot of action", and led the Tigers in tackles.

As a senior in 1987, he set the NCAA Division I-AA record for most interceptions in a season with 12, surpassing the 11 by Bill McGovern in 1984. His record stood until Rashean Mathis had 14 in 2002. Cain began the year with a two-interception performance against Dartmouth, then had his school-best 13th career pick the following week versus Davidson. In the season finale, Cain picked off Cornell three times in a seven-interception performance for the Princeton defense. The Associated Press named him a first team I-AA All-American, and he also received the John P. Poe–Richard W. Kazmaier Jr. Football Trophy for the year. He finished his collegiate career with a school-record 22 interceptions in 30 games.

After his graduation in 1988, he signed on as a free agent with the National Football League's Buffalo Bills. He hurt his right knee during training camp, which prevented him from playing in the preseason and he underwent an arthroscopy in late July. Cain was placed on the Bills' injured reserve list for the season. The injury ended his football career prematurely.

== Career ==
With little hope of returning to sports, Cain turned to screenwriting and then acting, shooting dozens of commercials, including a volleyball-themed spot for Kellogg's Frosted Flakes and appearing on such popular television shows as Grapevine, A Different World, and Beverly Hills, 90210.

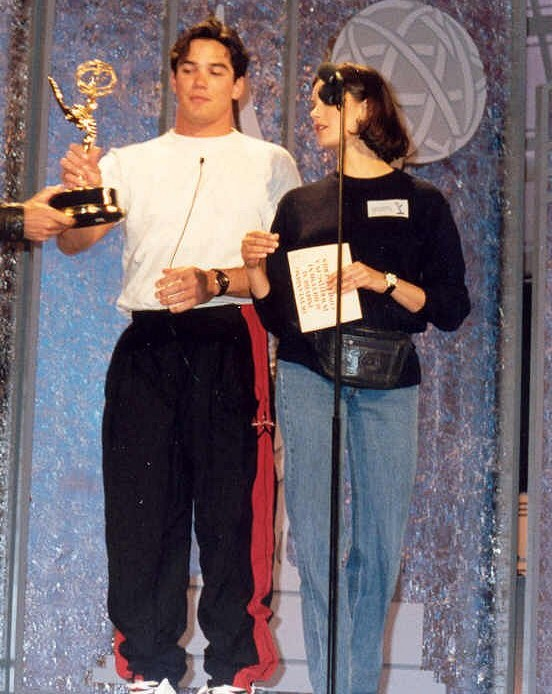
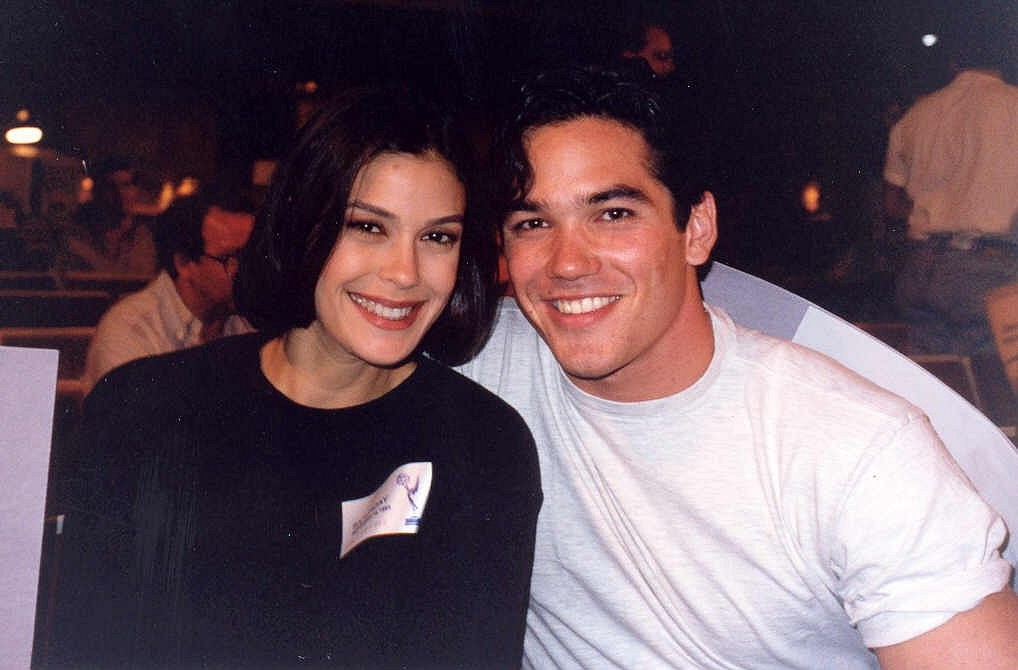
Cain and Teri Hatcher at the 45th Primetime Emmy Awards rehearsal, September 19, 1993

In 1993, Cain took his biggest role to date, that of Superman in the television series Lois & Clark: The New Adventures of Superman. At the height of its popularity, the program drew an average of at least 15 million viewers per episode. The series ran for four seasons, ending in 1997. Cain later made his first return to the Superman franchise with a special guest role in a season seven episode of Smallville, as the immortal Dr. Curtis Knox, a character based upon the DC Comics villain Vandal Savage; Cain returned to the Superman universe again between 2015 and 2017, in a recurring role on Supergirl, as the title character's foster father, Jeremiah Danvers.

In 1998, Cain started the Angry Dragon Entertainment production company, which produced the TBS Superstation television series Ripley's Believe It or Not! He has also starred in several films, including The Broken Hearts Club (2000), Out of Time (2003), and Bailey's Billion$ (2004). In 2004, he played Scott Peterson in the made-for-television movie The Perfect Husband: The Laci Peterson Story. He appeared in a recurring role as Casey Manning in the television series Las Vegas. He also had a lead role in the VH1 hit series Hit the Floor, that of Pete Davenport, who becomes the new head coach of a fictional professional basketball team and has an illegitimate daughter who is a cheerleader for his Los Angeles Devils team.

In 2009, Cain was ranked No. 33 on VH1's 40 Hottest Hotties of the '90s. Cain was a contestant in an NBC celebrity reality competition series called Stars Earn Stripes. He won four out of six missions on the show, though he came in third in the finals. In 2012, he participated in Fox's dating game show The Choice.

In 2013, Cain hosted a reality show about Bigfoot titled 10 Million Dollar Bigfoot Bounty, where he offered contestants $10 million to prove the existence of Bigfoot. Cain later appeared in the mid-season premiere of Comic Book Men, appearing at Kevin Smith's Secret Stash where the crew was celebrating 75 years of Superman, where it was claimed that his portrayal of the character helped people care about Superman again. Cain appeared in the film God's Not Dead, in which he plays an arrogant businessman. In 2016, Cain played a guest role on the Netflix original series Lady Dynamite as Graham, the ex-fiancé of Maria Bamford.

Cain is also known for having appeared in 16 Christmas films and several faith-based films.

In 2018, Cain hosted a television infomercial for The National Real Estate Network, an entity which seeks to persuade individuals to attend meetings where they can learn about flipping real estate. In October of that year, it was discovered that Ronnie Mund (Ronnie the Limo Driver), the personal driver and bodyguard of radio DJ Howard Stern, had been using a photoshopped picture of Cain as his own publicity photo. Specifically, Mund's head had been transposed onto the body of Cain. Mund initially denied the photo was altered but eventually acknowledged he had been using the fraudulent photo for over five years. Mund claimed he was unaware the photo was not genuine. Cain co-starred in the 2018 film Gosnell: The Trial of America's Biggest Serial Killer about the investigation and trial of Kermit Gosnell. He also starred in the 2018 film Andy the Talking Hedgehog.

In 2019, Cain starred alongside Kristy Swanson in the play FBI Lovebirds, which mocked Peter Strzok and Lisa Page, two FBI agents who were on the team investigating Russian interference in the 2016 United States elections.

In June 2021, it was announced that he would make his directorial debut with Little Angels and star in it.

As of 2021, Cain was the Actor in Residence at High Point University.

== Personal life ==
For two years in the 1980s, Cain dated actress Brooke Shields while they were attending Princeton University. In 1992, he dated Gabrielle Reece, a professional beach-volleyball player and model. In 1997, Cain became engaged to Mindy McCready, a singer; they broke up in 1998.

He has a son, Christopher Cain, born June 11, 2000, with one of his ex-girlfriends, Samantha Torres, a Playboy Playmate and model. Cain named his son after his adoptive father, Christopher Cain, a film director.

On June 19, 2018, Cain was sworn in as a reserve police officer for the St. Anthony Police Department in Idaho. In 2020, he joined the Pocatello Police Department in Idaho as a reserve police officer. He also subsequently joined the Frederick County, Virginia Sheriff's Office as a reserve deputy sheriff.

=== Political views ===
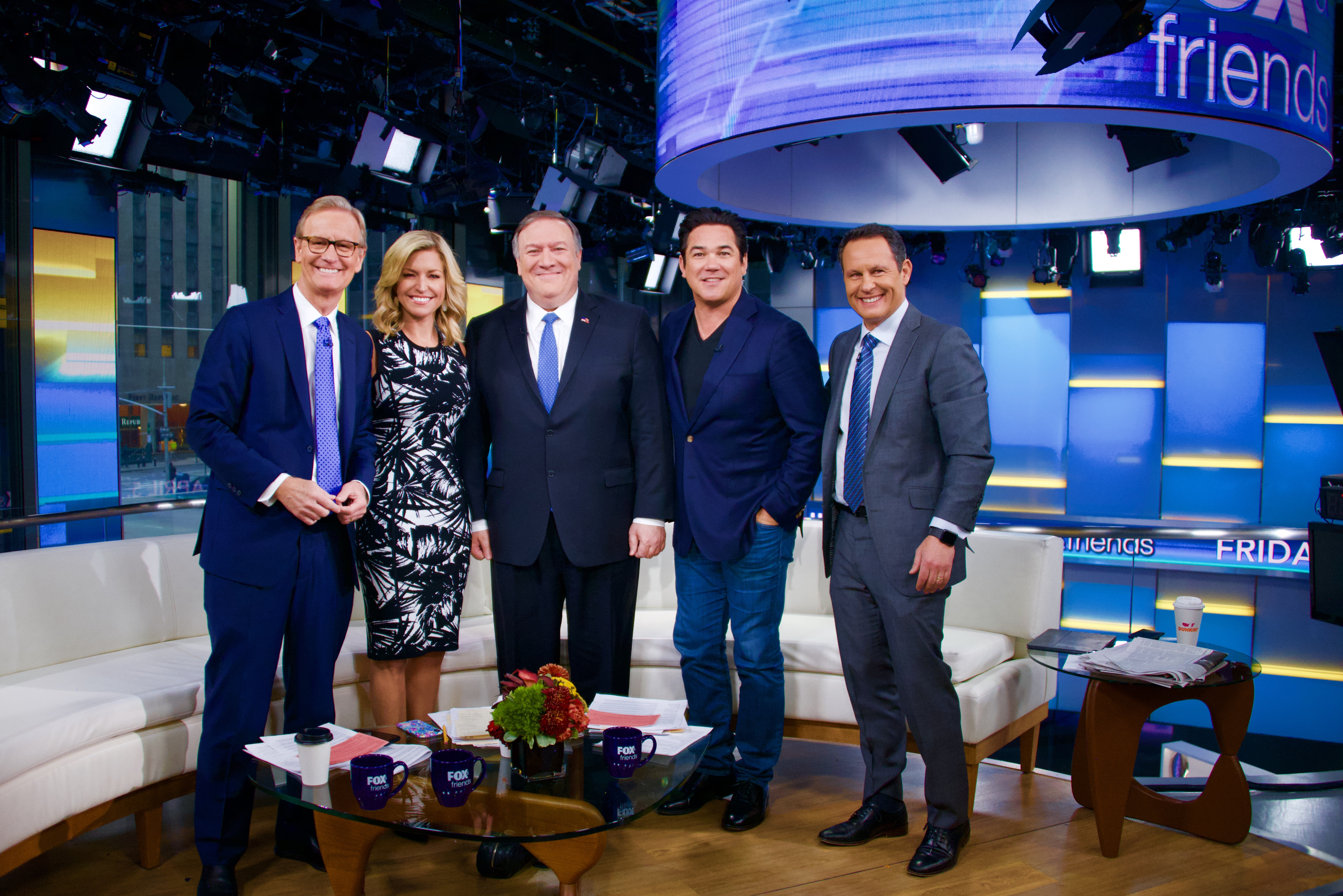
Cain (second from right) with Mike Pompeo on Fox & Friends in 2019

Cain says that he voted for Bill Clinton in both the 1992 and 1996, as well as for Al Gore in 2000, the latter of which he later said he "regretted". He supported John McCain in 2008 and supported Rick Perry at the Republican primaries in 2012. In 2016, 2020, and 2024, he endorsed and voted for Donald Trump.

Cain is an advocate for recognition of the Armenian genocide. He participated in the Armenian-American march on the 90th anniversary of the genocide. He is also an executive producer of Architects of Denial, a 2017 historical documentary on the effects of the genocide. In 2018, he was awarded Armenia's Order of Honor by President Serzh Sargsyan for his contributions on spreading awareness.

In 2018, Cain was elected to the board of directors of the National Rifle Association of America. That same year, Cain said that he was once a registered Republican, but later became a registered independent, feeling that the Republican Party did not "fully represent his views".

In 2025, Cain released a video indicating that he had joined Immigration and Customs Enforcement (ICE) and encouraging others to "join the agency as well".

== Filmography ==
=== Film ===
Year	Title	Role	Notes
1976	Elmer	Dean Russell	
1979	Charlie and the Talking Buzzard	Joe	
1984	The Stone Boy	Eugene Hillerman	
1990	Write to Kill	Parking valet	
1990	Going Under	Guy in bar	
1992	Miracle Beach	Volleyball player no.1	
1997	Eating Las Vegas	Frank	Short film
1997	Best Men	Sergeant "Buzz" Thomas	
2000	The Broken Hearts Club	Cole	
2000	No Alibi	Bob Valenz	
2000	Flight of Fancy	Clay Bennett	
2000	Militia	Ethan Carter	Direct-to-video
2000	For the Cause	General Murran	Direct-to-video
2001	Phase IV	Simon Tate	Direct-to-video
2001	Fire Trap	Jack / Max Hooper	Also producer
2001	Rat Race	Shawn Kent	
2001	A Christmas Adventure ...From a Book Called Wisely's Tales	Donner	Voice; direct-to-video
2002	New Alcatraz	Dr. Robert Trenton	Direct-to-video
2002	Dark Descent	Will Murdack	
2003	Breakaway	Morgan	
2003	Out of Time	Chris Harrison	
2003	Grandpa's Place		Cameo; short film
2004	Post Impact	Tom Parker	
2004	Lost	Jeremy Stanton	
2005	Truth	Peter	
2005	Bailey's Billion$	Theodore Maxwell	
2005	Wrinkles		
2006	Max Havoc: Ring of Fire	Roger Tarso	
2006	September Dawn	Joseph Smith	
2007	Urban Decay	Stan	
2008	Ace of Hearts	Daniel Harding	
2008	Five Dollars a Day	Rick Carlson	
2009	Aussie and Ted's Great Adventure	Michael Brooks	
2009	Maneater	Harry	Direct-to-video
2010	Circle of Pain	Wyatt	
2010	Abandoned	Kevin Peterson	
2010	Hole in One	Repo Man	
2010	Kill Katie Malone	Robert	
2010	Pure Country 2: The Gift	Music video director	Also co-writer
2010	A Nanny for Christmas	Danny Donner	Direct-to-video
2010	Subject: I Love You	James Trapp	
2010	Bed & Breakfast	Jake	
2011	5 Days of War	Chris Bailot	
2011	Home Run Showdown	Rico Deluca	
2011	Dirty Little Trick	Michael	
2011	The Fallen	Cole	
2011	Latin Quarter	Appolinaire	
2011	Vacation	Bryce	
2011	The Sandy Creek Girls	Jared	
2012	Meant to Be	Mike	
2012	I Am... Gabriel	Sheriff Brody	
2013	Heaven's Door	Leo	
2013	Man Camp	Luke	
2013	Defending Santa	Sheriff Scott Hanson	
2013	The Tale of the Princess Kaguya	The Mikado	Voice; English dub
2014	At the Top of the Pyramid	Jefferson Parker	
2014	God's Not Dead	Marc Shelley	
2014	The Appearing	Dr. Shaw	
2014	Airplane vs. Volcano	Rick Pierce	
2014	A Belle for Christmas	Glenn Barrows	
2014	Small Town Santa	Sheriff Rick Langston	
2014	A Horse for Summer	Kent Walsh	
2014	A Dog for Christmas	Earl	
2014	Horse Camp	Luke	
2014	The Three Dogateers	Matt	
2015	Vendetta	Mason Danvers	
2015	Deadly Sanctuary	Roy Hollingsworth	
2016	DC Super Hero Girls: Hero of the Year	Jonathan Kent	Voice
2016	The Black Hole	Mark Willis	
2017	Illicit	Felipe	
2018	The Incantation	Abel Baddon	
2018	Gosnell: The Trial of America's Biggest Serial Killer	Detective James "Woody" Wood	
2018	Megan's Christmas Miracle	John	
2018	Andy the Talking Hedgehog	Bob	
2018	2050	Maxwell	
2018	Prolonged Exposure	Detective Jaime Montenegro	
2019	The Challenger Disaster	Larry Arnold	
2019	Sweet Inspirations	Greg	
2019	Ria	Vice President Flemming	
2019	90 Feet from Home	Raymond Fuller	
2019	The Seven	High Priest Asael	
2019	The Follower	Sheriff	
2019	A Promise to Astrid	Pastor Scott Seabury	
2019	Madness in the Method	Dean	
2020	OBAMAGATE : The Movie	Peter Strzok	
2020	Skydog	Neil Glasswell	
2020	Faith Under Fire	Pastor Dan Underwood	
2020	Baby Bulldog	Judge Kelly	
2021	Break Every Chain	Pastor Gabe	
2021	Trail Blazers	Haden	
2021	A Parent's Worst Nightmare	John Belton	
2022	No Vacancy	Cliff Lea	
2022	Miracle at Manchester	Dr. Getty	
2022	The Ride	Mark Smith	
2023	R.A.D.A.R.: The Adventures of the Bionic Dog	Mayor	
2024	Letters at Christmas	Jason Lawrence	
2025	Little Angels	Jake Rogers	Also director

=== Television ===
Year	Title	Role	Notes
1989	Christine Cromwell: Things That Go Bump in the Night		Television film
1990	Christine Cromwell: In Vino Veritas		Television film
1990	Life Goes On	Kimo	Episode: "Corky and the Dolphins"
1992	A Different World	Eddie	Episode: "The Cat's in the Cradle"
1992	Grapevine	Brian	Episode: "The Janice and Brian Story"
1992	Beverly Hills, 90210	Rick	4 episodes
1993	Touchdown: Football Goes to the Movies	Himself	Host; documentary
1993–1997	Lois & Clark: The New Adventures of Superman	Clark Kent / Superman	Also writer (2 episodes)
1995	Off Camera with Dean Cain	Himself	Host; also director and producer
1995	Living Single	Himself	Episode: "Mommy Not Dearest"
1996	Cutty Whitman	Clark Kent	Television film; uncredited
1997	Rag and Bone	Tony Moran	Television film; also producer
1998	Adventures from the Book of Virtues	King Charlemagne	Voice; episode: "Integrity"
1998	Futuresport	Tremayne "Tre The Pharaoh" Ramzey	Television film
1998	Dogboys	Julian Taylor	Television film
2000	The Runaway	Sheriff Frank Richards	Television film
2000–2003	Ripley's Believe It or Not!	Himself	Host; also producer
2001	Just Shoot Me!	Chris Williams	Episode: "Maya Stops Thinking"
2002	Gentle Ben	Jack Wedloe	Television film
2002	The Glow	Matt Lawrence	Television film
2002	Frasier	Rick	Episode: "We Two Kings"
2002	Christmas Rush	Lieutenant Cornelius Morgan	Television film
2003	Gentle Ben 2: Danger on the Mountain	Jack Wedloe	Television film
2003	Dragon Fighter	Captain David Carver	Television film; also producer
2003–2004	The Division	Inspector Jack Ellis	8 episodes
2004	I Do (But I Don't)	Nick Corina	Television film
2004	The Perfect Husband: The Laci Peterson Story	Scott Peterson	Television film
2004–2005	Clubhouse	Conrad Dean	11 episodes
2005	Mayday	Commander James Slan	Television film
2005	Law & Order: Special Victims Unit	Dr. Mike Jergens	Episode: "Starved"
2005	Hope & Faith	Larry Walker	4 episodes
2005–2006	Las Vegas	Casey Manning	9 episodes
2006	Dead and Deader	Lieutenant Bobby Quinn	Television film
2006	10.5: Apocalypse	Brad	Miniseries
2006	A Christmas Wedding	Tucker	Television film
2007	Crossroads: A Story of Forgiveness	Bruce Murakami	Television film
2007	Hidden Camera	Dan Kovacs	Television film
2007	Smallville	Dr. Curtis Knox	Episode: "Cure"
2007	CSI: Miami	Roger Partney	Episode: "Permanent Vacation"
2008	Final Approach	Jack Bender	Television film
2008	Making Mr. Right	Eddie	Television film
2009	The Gambler, the Girl and the Gunslinger	Shea McCall	Television film
2009	The Three Gifts	Jack Green	Television film
2009	The Dog Who Saved Christmas	Ted Stein	Television film
2009	Entourage	Himself	Episode: "Scared Straight"
2010	Frost Giant	J.C.	Television film
2010	The Way Home	Randy Simpkins	Television film
2010	The Dog Who Saved Christmas Vacation	Ted Stein	Television film
2011	A Mile in His Shoes	Arthur "Murph" Murphy	Television film
2011	Burn Notice	Ryan Pewterbaugh	Episode: "Fail Safe"
2011	The Dog Who Saved Halloween	Ted Stein	Television film
2011	The Case for Christmas	Michael Sherman	Television film
2012	Operation Cupcake	Griff Carson	Television film
2012	Criminal Minds	Curtis Banks	Episode: "Snake Eyes"
2012	Don't Trust the B— in Apartment 23	Himself	3 episodes
2012	Stars Earn Stripes	Himself	5 episodes
2012	The Choice	Himself	Contestant
2012	Bloopers	Himself	Host
2012	The Dog Who Saved the Holidays	Ted Stein	Television film
2013	Texas Takedown: The Real Men in Black	Narrator	Voice
2013–2018	Hit the Floor	Pete Davenport	
2014	10 Million Dollar Bigfoot Bounty	Himself	Host
2014	Comic Book Men	Himself	Episode: "Superman's 75th"
2014	Mulaney	Himself	Pilot episode
2014	The Dog Who Saved Easter	Ted Stein	Television film
2014	Merry Ex-Mas	Jessie Rogers	Television film
2014–present	Masters of Illusion	Himself	Host
2015	A Wish Come True	Himself	Television film
2015	The Dog Who Saved Summer	Ted Stein	Television film
2015	Beverly Hills Christmas	Archangel Gabriel	Television film
2015–2017	Supergirl	Jeremiah Danvers	6 episodes
2016	Broadcasting Christmas	Charlie Fisher	Television film
2016	The Jump	Himself	
2016	Lady Dynamite	Graham	6 episodes
2016	Good Morning Christmas	Charlie Fisher	Television film
2018	Winter's Dream	Ty	Television film
2023	The Curse	Mark Rose	2 episodes

=== Video games ===
Year	Title	Voice role	Notes
2002	Grandia Xtreme	Evann	

=== Theatre ===
Year	Title	Role	Notes
2019	FBI Lovebirds: Undercovers	Peter Strzok	
