= Listen (2012 film) =

2012 film

- Film poster
- Directed by: F.C.Rabbath
- Written by: F.C.Rabbath
- Produced by: F.C.Rabbath; Vanessa Vandy; Adam Bertocci
- Starring: Joshua Mikel; Julie Moss; Avery Pohl; Julie Moss; Zac Pullam; Bill Kelly
- Cinematography: F.C.Rabbath
- Music by: Tony Anderson; Sean Beeson; Valentin Boomes; Oliver Carman; Ryan Taubert; Ivan Torrent
- Production company: F.C.Rabbath Creations
- Release date: August 29, 2012
- Running time: 90 minutes
- Country: United States
- Language: English

Listen is a 2012 American thriller/sci-fi/comedy film written/directed by F.C.Rabbath. The story is based on a short film by the same writer/director made in 2007. The film stars Joshua Mikel, Sergio Soltero, Bill Kelly and Lanny Thomas.

The film showed at the 2013 Portland International Film Festival, and was released to theatres in 2015.

== Plot ==
David discovers everyone has music inside them and creates a device to manipulate them.

== Cast ==
- Joshua Mikel as David
- Sergio Soltero as Mark
- Julie Moss as Professor's Wife
- Lanny Thomas as Professor
- Zac Pullam as Young David

== Critical reception ==
Film Threat strongly recommended the film.

Showed twice at the Portland Film Festival.

Winner at the Wilmore 9 Film Festival

Film selected early showing in the new UHD technology.
