= Andy the Talking Hedgehog =

2018 children's film

- Promotional poster
- Directed by: Joel Paul Reisig
- Written by: Allison Rowe
- Produced by: Joel Paul Reisig
- Starring: Tara Reid; Dean Cain
- Cinematography: Johnathan Robert Hart
- Edited by: Jeffrey T. Morgan
- Music by: Gabriel Pilon
- Distributed by: Be Your Own Hollywood
- Release dates: November 2018 (Port Huron); 7 May 2019
- Running time: 76 minutes
- Country: United States
- Language: English

Andy the Talking Hedgehog is a 2018 American fantasy adventure film. The film stars Tara Reid, Dean Cain, and newcomer child actor Karina Martinez. It was directed by Joel Paul Reisig.

== Premise ==
Animals and plants, including the hedgehog Andy and a cat, are given the ability to talk after a fairy grants a girl a wish. Local robbers try to capture her talking hedgehog; her father helps out in the situation.

== Production ==
The film was directed by Joel Paul Reisig, whose other films include Arlo the Burping Pig, Rodeo Girl, Amanda and the Fox, and Horse Camp. It was released by Reisig's company Be Your Own Hollywood. The film's poster was first revealed on Twitter by Tara Reid. The poster included co-stars Dean Cain and Karina Martinez. Reid stated that she was not taking the film seriously and that the poster is bad. She also said that "it's going to be fun; it's a cute movie".

== Release ==
The film premiered at Sperry's Moviehouse in Port Huron, Michigan in 2018. It was released on DVD on May 7, 2019 by Echo Bridge Home Entertainment.
