= The Black Hole (2016 film) =

2016 American science fiction film

- Film poster
- Directed by: Mark Steven Grove
- Written by: Mark Daniels
- Produced by: Meryem Ersoz
- Starring: Malcolm McDowell; Dean Cain; Izzie Steele; Natalie Distler
- Cinematography: Jon Firestone
- Music by: Jeremy Christopher
- Production companies: Black Wing Digital; Red Pine Studios; Asgard Entertainment
- Distributed by: ITN Distribution
- Release date: December 2, 2016
- Running time: 111 minutes
- Country: United States
- Language: English

The Black Hole is an American science-fiction film directed by Mark Grove and released on December 2, 2016. The film was originally titled Mind's Eye, and was also released internationally under the name Quantum Voyage. The film explores the effects caused in the real world by quantum entanglement and an occurrence of "The Einstein-Podolsky-Rosen Paradox".

== Plot ==
A violinist has hallucinations that show her the collapse of space and time. The visions she experiences, and the things she hears, lead her to a portal through time and space to a parallel dimension.

== Cast ==
- Malcolm McDowell as Mr. Simms
- Dean Cain as Mark Willis
- Izzie Steele as Mattie Carver
- Natalie Distler as Jess Selvy
- Jesse Kove as Fritz
- Aaron Perilo as Jim Bonza
- Lucine Fyelon as Aiyana Seneca
- Kristin Keating as Mrs. Pendergraft

== Production ==
The film was shot both in Boulder, Colorado, and in Colorado state. Filming was initially slated for May and June 2011. According to the film's producer Ersoz, Boulder was chosen because it is "a beautiful, under-photographed place" and that "No one has ever recognized its gothic possibilities in a film before". Permits were sought for locations in Boulder including the University of Colorado campus. Ersoz said that McDowell would bring "a magical, wizard-like quality and will bring that essence to the film." She also said that Cain had "a terrific screen presence" and that he would "bring the right mix of strength and vulnerability" to the role.

The film was set, filmed and produced in Boulder, and was set to highlight Boulder and use its local talent. Ersoz said that when outside production companies and productions are in Boulder they show a "stereotyping of Boulder that is ‘People's Republic-ish ... They are on the Pearl Street Mall, and they make references to Birkenstocks and wheat grass and whatever is crunchy liberal." She said that she feels the city has a "welcoming and threatening" presence and that she wanted to milk the "Gothic presence that hangs over the city", with the city being a "character in the film." Ersoz and her production company Black Wing are both based in Boulder, and in keeping with the Boulder promotion, Boulder actress Kristin Keating and Denver based Kevin Sean Ryan are both in the film. Keating said that "I think Meryem is really making a push to make this [Colorado] a bigger market", with Ryan adding "the movie's star power will 'put Colorado on the map'".

The film was initially declared as to be released in 3D, though confusion arose as it was reported that it was to be shot fully in 3D, as well as mostly in 2D with a plan to film one of the major scenes in 3D. Filming was scheduled from 23 May 2011 to 29 June, with shooting beginning in Boulder in May 2011.

The film was based on an original screenplay by Mark Daniels.
