= Hansel vs. Gretel =

- Promotional poster
- Directed by: Ben Demaree
- Screenplay by: Jose Prendes
- Based on: Hansel and Gretel by Brothers Grimm
- Produced by: David Michael Latt; David Rimawi; Paul Bales; Dylan Vox
- Starring: Brent Lydic; Lili Baross; Aqueela Zoll; Jhey Castles; Riley Murphy
- Cinematography: Ben Demaree
- Edited by: Bob Muir
- Music by: Chris Ridenhour and Christopher Cano
- Production company: The Asylum
- Distributed by: The Asylum Home Entertainment
- Release date: January 20, 2015 (USA)
- Running time: 87 minutes
- Country: United States
- Language: English

Hansel vs. Gretel (stylized as Hansel V Gretel) is a 2015 action horror film released by The Asylum as a sequel to the company's 2013 Hansel & Gretel — a modern update of the classic Brothers Grimm fairytale of the same name. The film picks up after the events of the first film and follows witch hunter Hansel, as he battles his sister Gretel, who is under a dark spell and is trying to become the new leader of a coven of witches. Brent Lydic returns to star as Hansel, although Gretel was recast and portrayed by Lili Baross.

== Plot ==
Several years after the events of the first film, a Candlewood local, Mason, stops by Gretel's pie shop & bakery shortly after close one night, but is killed by a hooded figure. Elsewhere, Hansel has spent several years becoming a witch hunter and has just killed an elusive witch Bunny, when he learns of his old friend Mason's disappearance. He decides to return home to Gretel, who he hasn't talked to for a year. He arrives at Gretel's and she tells him her suspicions that Mason was murdered in the bakery. That night, four witches, Circe, Kikimora, Morai, and their high priestess Cthonia, convene in the woods nearby Candlewood. They take control of a local homeless woman to be their servant in their plot to avenge their sister Lilith's death and take back her shop.

The following day, Hansel and Gretel visit Mason's brother Jacob and his roommate Willy and Hansel explains his theory that a new witch has taken over Lilith's bakery. Jacob and Willy insist on helping the search for Mason, but when the group leaves the house, the witch's homeless woman begins shooting at them. Gretel is kidnapped while the other three take cover. Hansel shoots and kills the homeless woman and discovers a witch's mark on her forehead confirming his theory, when they all realize Gretel is gone. Meanwhile, Gretel is tied up in the bakery and confronted by the witches. She confesses to killing Lilith and implies she ate part of her, gaining her powers. Cthonia makes a deal with Gretel: in exchange for Hansel's head, they'll let her keep Lilith's bakery; if she doesn't kill Hansel, they will kill her instead.

Gretel kidnaps Willy and the following day, Hansel gets hostage pictures of Gretel and Willy texted to him, which he shows to Jacob. Jacob conveniently took some photography classes and recognizes graffiti in the pictures as being from an abandoned warehouse. Once there, they find Gretel and the unconscious Willy tied up, when Kikimora fills the room with a blinding fog. Gretel allows Hansel to decapitate Kikimora and while he and Jason help Willy, she feeds on Kikimora's corpse, gaining her powers. Hansel is convinced there are more witches but they are able to escape, while Circe watches them. Hansel drops off the others and then goes to the bakery. Circe confronts Gretel at her house about Kikimora's death. Gretel offers to take her to Hansel so Circe can kill him herself. At the bakery, Circe hypnotizes Hansel to kill himself with his own knife. Before he can, Gretel summons Kikimora's blinding fog which breaks Hansel's hypnosis, allowing him to stab Circe in the face. As she dies, Gretel, obscured by the fog, drinks her blood and gains her powers. Hansel goes to check on Willy and Gretel goes to hypnotize Jacob into sleeping with her and then killing himself, but it doesn't work because Jacob is gay. Instead, Gretel kills him with brute force.

Hansel and Willy find a package at her door with Jacob’s eyes inside then led on a macabre scavenger hunt with Jacob’s body parts. Gretel brings the rest of Jacob’s body to Morai telling her it's Hansel and then hides nearby. The notes eventually lead Hansel and Willy to Morai's location. Hansel kills Morai and leaves with Willy; Gretel drinks Morai's blood. Cthonia calls Gretel from her grandma's phone, luring her back home. She threatens to kill her grandma but Gretel tears off her grandma's head instead which Hansel and Willy witness. Cthonia concedes her high priestess ring to Gretel who assumes power over the coven. She and Cthonia take Willy and Hansel to the local pet cemetery where Gretel reveals she's buried Lilith. Now holding enough power, Gretel begins a resurrection incantation, bringing Lilith back to life. Gretel then rips Cthonia's throat out so Lilith can regenerate when suddenly Willy reveals herself to actually be a powerful witch-crone who disintegrates Lilith. Hansel cuts Willy's throat, killing her, and confronts Gretel. They fight each other with neither sibling initially willing to kill the other. Hansel eventually shoots Gretel in the shoulder as police cars pull up. She admits defeat and they walk off together.

== Cast ==
- Brent Lydic as Hansel, An expert witch hunter.
- Lili Baross as Gretel, Operates Lilith's "The Gingerbread Man" bakery and café, gained Lilith's powers after she ate part of the witch.
- Aqueela Zoll as Willy, Briefly dated Hansel several years prior.
- Riley Murphy as Jacob, Mason's Brother
- Jhey Castles as Cthonia, Leader of the witches plotting to revenge against Gretel.
- Adinett Nsabimana as Morai, The Witch who can emit energy blasts from her body.
- Nanrisa Lee as Kikimora, The Witch able to summon blinding fog.
- Elisha Kriis as Circe, The Witch with the gift of hypnosis.
- Barbara Scolaro as Lilith, The witch who Gretel defeated and the first film's main antagonist.
- Carol Stanzione as Bag Lady, Homeless woman possessed to do the bidding of the witches.
- Christopher Callen as Grandmother, Gretel and Hansel's grandmother who now lives with Gretel after the death of the sibling's father.
- Maria Olsen as Crone
- Jennifer Elizabeth as Bunny, Powerful witch who Hansel kills at the start of the film
- Alexander Price as Mason, Goes missing at the start of the film, killed in Gretel's bakery
- Kevin Yarbrough as Sheriff Lopez
- Fawn Stone as Deputy Castiniera

== Release ==
The film went into production shortly after the first film's release near the end of 2013. Screenwriter Jose Prendes said in an interview with GeeksofDoom.com from January 2014 that he would be scripting Hansel vs. Gretel in June of that year for The Asylum to produce and release in 2015. The film was released on DVD on January 20, 2015, by The Asylum Home Entertainment, with special features including a featurette, gag reel and trailers.

== Reception ==
HorrorNews.net published a mixed review of Hansel vs. Gretel in 2018. Although the reviewer was not familiar with either The Asylum's 2013 Hansel & Gretel or its big-budget inspiration, Hansel & Gretel: Witch Hunters, the reviewer acknowledges The Asylum staying true to form by capitalizing on the publicity of the latter film with their own adaptation of the fairy tale. The reviewer is surprised to find Hansel vs. Gretel better than expected, and praises Baross's and Lydic's performances for being charismatic and well-acted. The reviewer also notes that the movie "doesn’t at all take itself seriously", which makes its humor surprisingly effective. However, the reviewer writes that the special effects are low-budget and lacking at times, and that the ending is odd, but entertaining nonetheless. The reviewer ultimately likens the film to an episode of Charmed, but with more gore, and awards it a rating of 2.5/5.

Seven Days covered Hansel vs. Gretel in 2015 in their segment "Movies You Missed", a weekly blog for the newspaper. The reviewer points out that the film ultimately delivers on its title, but also acknowledges that the witch-on-witch battles are more entertaining. The reviewer also argues that this movie "would be right at home on MST3K" and that viewers should not approach it with high expectations.

== See also ==
- List of films about witchcraft
