= Hansel & Gretel (2013 film) =

2013 film by Anthony C. Ferrante

- Promotional poster
- Directed by: Anthony C. Ferrante
- Screenplay by: Jose Prendes
- Based on: Hansel and Gretel by Brothers Grimm (uncredited)
- Produced by: David Michael Latt; David Rimawi; Paul Bales
- Starring: Dee Wallace; Brent Lydic; Stephanie Greco
- Cinematography: Ben Demaree
- Music by: Alan Howarth
- Production company: The Asylum
- Distributed by: The Asylum
- Release date: January 8, 2013
- Country: United States
- Language: English

Hansel & Gretel is a 2013 American direct-to-video dark fantasy horror film produced by The Asylum and directed by Anthony C. Ferrante, starring Dee Wallace, Brent Lydic and Stephanie Greco. The film is a modern retelling of the Brothers Grimm fairytale of the same name, taking place in Candlewood, New Jersey and follows the eponymous pair of adolescent siblings who find themselves kidnapped by a cannibalistic bakery-owning witch who devours human meat as a way to rejuvenate her youth.

It was released on January 8, 2013, considered a "mockbuster", intended to capitalize on the release of Paramount and MGM's film Hansel & Gretel: Witch Hunters. A sequel was released on January 20, 2015, titled Hansel vs. Gretel and takes place several years after the first film, following Hansel who becomes a witch hunter and must battle his sister, who is under a dark spell and is trying to become the new leader of a coven of witches.

== Plot ==
A woman, named Sylvia, being kept prisoner in a dungeon, breaks her chains and escapes, but falls into a deep trap-hole outside, breaking her leg. She is taken inside and “prepared” with seasonings and vegetables before being roasted alive in an oven.

At “The Gingerbread House”, a pie and pastry shop run by an older woman named Lilith, employee Gretel Grimm is hosting a private family dinner after hours for her twin brother, Hansel, their widowed father, Brandon and his girlfriend, Ruby Lumiers. Brandon reveals he intends to marry Ruby and that they plan to sell their house and travel across the world. This infuriates Hansel who storms out into the nearby woods and eventually Gretel follows him, finding him in a bear trap. She spots a nearby cabin and to Gretel's surprise, Lilith answers her knock at the door and invites them inside. Gretel notices several very old family pictures up of Lilith and her children, twin boys John and Bobby and Abigail, who died as an infant. Lilith feeds Hansel and gives Gretel some tea and they soon fall into a deep sleep. Gretel wakes up the next morning with a headache in Lilith's bed with Lilith sitting beside her. Lilith tells Gretel that a neighbour took Hansel to the hospital and suggests she shower to feel better.

Hansel wakes up in a dungeon with three others, Kevin, Dana and Jane, all chained to the walls. The now brutish John and Bobby bring in a tray piled with cakes and pastries and pull Dana out with them as they leave. They prepare her on a human spit roast in the oven. After Gretel showers, she is confronted by Lilith, who offers her the deed to The Gingerbread House, telling Gretel she intends to leave the bakery to her. When Gretel agrees, Lilith jerks the deed from her hand “accidentally”, giving Gretel a paper cut. A drop of her blood falls onto the deed, “signing” it unintentionally in blood, to Lilith's delight. Gretel notices a bloody fingernail on the floor and finds a trapdoor to an underground dungeon, hearing Hansel calling for her. Having been found out, Lilith has her sons force Gretel to join in on “family dinner”, where she serves the freshly cooked Dana. Gretel stabs John with her knife, causing Lilith to throw her into the dungeon.

Bobby takes Jane out of the dungeon to prepare her, but Hansel is able to soon pick the lock. Kevin decides to save himself and escapes while Hansel and Gretel decide to save Jane. Hansel and Gretel overpower Bobby, killing him. They free Jane but John finds Bobby's body, dons a gas mask, and fills the dungeon with hallucinogenic gas. Hansel, Gretel and Jane each have their own horrific hallucinations. Meanwhile, Brandon has since alerted Sheriff Woody Mekes about his children's disappearance and he begins searching for Lilith. Brandon and Ruby search the forest and eventually find Lilith's cabin. Brandon recognizes Lilith's car outside, but Lilith attacks him with a pitchfork, then kills Ruby with a machete. In the dungeon, John kills Jane, but Hansel and Gretel crawl inside the oven and through a small vent shaft while John gives chase. They make it outside and find Lilith having just murdered Ruby. Brandon attacks her, allowing Hansel and Gretel to escape with John still pursuing. As they are running away, they encounter Sheriff Mekes, who has accidentally hit and killed Kevin while he was on the highway trying to flag someone down. Mekes shoots and kills John but Lilith emerges from the forest and kills Mekes with an arrow. She forces the siblings back to the cabin and tries once more to convince Gretel to join her, but Gretel stabs her in the face with Ruby's silver cross necklace. She and Hansel run to the dungeon, luring Lilith into the oven and trapping her before she realizes it. Gretel turns the oven on, burning Lilith alive. She and Hansel narrowly escape as the hallucinogenic gas ignites and the cabin explodes.

Later, Gretel is in Lilith's bakery when Hansel stops in to let her know that their father is being released from the hospital. She says she will meet him and he leaves. Gretel goes to the door and flips the closed sign to open, then returns to the counter and takes a bite of a meat pie, smiling menacingly.

== Cast ==
- Dee Wallace as Lilith, a centuries-old witch who uses human meat to rejuvenate her youth, and runs "The Gingerbread House" bakery.
- Brent Lydic as Hansel Grimm
- Stephanie Greco as Gretel Grimm
- Steve Hanks as Brandon Grimm, Hansel and Gretel's father.
- Trish Coren as Ruby Lumiers, Hansel and Gretel's future stepmother.
- Victims in Lilith's cabin:
  - Sara Fletcher as Jane
  - Clark Perry as Kevin
  - Lydia Woods as Dana
- M. Steven Felty as Sheriff Woody Meckes
- Adrian Bustamante as Deputy Gerry Carter
- Lilith's two sons:
  - Jasper Cole as John
  - Frank Giarmona as Bobby
- Mariangela Pagan as Sylvia, a victim who fails to successfully escape. She is only named in the credits.
- Jonathan Nation as Jane's father, who appears in his daughter's hallucination.
- Jerey Basia as Double

== Production ==
Director Anthony C. Ferrante personally asked Dee Wallace to join the production, and was drawn to her character because it was more than just a stereotypical witch. Wallace found the shooting grueling; besides issues with the budget and time limitations, temperatures rose to 100 degrees fahrenheit, and there was no air conditioning. Wallace performed her own stunts.

== Release ==
The film was released direct-to-DVD on January 8, 2013. In the tradition of The Asylum's catalog, Hansel & Gretel is a mockbuster of the Paramount Pictures/MGM/MTV film Hansel & Gretel: Witch Hunters, which it preceded by five days.

== Reception ==
Scott Foy of Dread Central rated it 3/5 stars and called it "a perfectly okay horror movie", after seeing a misleading pull quote of his comments in a previous article used as ad copy. Mark L. Miller of AICN wrote that the film has "a few worthwhile and creative scenes of grue and gore" but frequently descends into tedious torture porn. Dave Pace of Fangoria rated it 2/4 stars and called it "a good evening of entertainment" that, outside of one shocking and imaginative hallucinatory scene, lacks ambition. Rod Lott of the Oklahoma Gazette wrote that it is "still technically a bad movie, but leagues above the label's usual level of dreck."

== Sequel ==
In 2015, The Asylum released a sequel titled Hansel vs. Gretel, picking up where the first film leaves off.

== See also ==
- List of films about witchcraft
