= 10 Million Dollar Bigfoot Bounty =

- Genre: Reality show
- Created by: Mike Riley
- Presented by: Dean Cain
- No. of seasons: 1
- No. of episodes: 8

Production
- Running time: 43 minutes
- Production company: Original Media

Original release
- Network: Spike
- Release: January 10 – February 21, 2014

10 Million Dollar Bigfoot Bounty is an American cryptozoology reality show that aired on Spike. The show premiered on January 10, 2014, and concluded its first season on February 21, 2014. The show is hosted by Dean Cain, Dr. Todd Disotell, and Natalia Reagan.

== Premise ==
Nine teams of big-game hunters and Sasquatch hunters are instructed to find proof of Bigfoot, a hominid-esque figure reportedly seen in the wilderness. Each episode the teams are given a specific challenge and one team will be eliminated in each episode. If the teams manage to find evidence to prove the existence of Bigfoot, they will be awarded $10,000,000. However the proof must stand up to scientific testing in order for the team to receive the money. If no conclusive evidence is found, the teams will be eliminated until only one remains – at which point the remaining team will receive $100,000.

== Contestant progress ==
Contestant	Episode							
Contestant	1	2	3	4	5	6	7	8
Stacey & Dave	SAFE	SAFE	SAFE	WIN	RISK	RISK	RISK	WIN
Michael & Kat	SAFE	RISK	RISK	SAFE	WIN	WIN	RISK	RUNNER-UP
Kirsten & Shaney	SAFE	RISK	SAFE	SAFE	SAFE	RISK	WIN	
Ro & Justin	RISK	WIN	RISK	RISK	SAFE	OUT		
Dan & Dave	RISK	SAFE	RISK	RISK	OUT			
Matt & Julie	WIN	SAFE	SAFE	OUT				
Rictor & Dax	SAFE	RISK	OUT					
Donny & Donnell	SAFE	OUT						
Travis & January	OUT							

Key
(WINNER) The team won the competition.
(RUNNER-UP) The team was the runner-up in the competition.
(WIN) The team won the Field Challenge.
(WIN) The team won the Field Challenge but was at risk of elimination.
(WIN) The team won the Field Challenge but was eliminated.
(SAFE) The team brought back sufficient evidence to move on in the competition.
(RISK) The team brought back insufficient evidence and was at risk of elimination.
(OUT) The team brought in the least evidence from the hunt and was eliminated from the competition.

== Episodes ==
No.	Title	Original release date	US viewers (millions)	Rating/Share 18-49
1	"Bigfoot's Blood"	January 10, 2014	0.212	0.633
Nine teams are given the task of searching for scientific proof of the existence of Bigfoot. The team that manages to provide evidence that will hold up under scientific scrutiny will win $10 million. If a team fails to rise to the episode's challenge, they will be eliminated. Field Test: Teams were given a blow gun with extraction darts. The first team to return with a usable sample of a big game animal would receive an extra two hours on the hunt.: Winner: Matthew & Julie - Yak.; Hunt: Evidence Presented: Dan & Dave - Hair Sample - was actually a sample of moss; Kirsten & Shaney - Gnawed Bone - bite could have been anything; Rictor & Dax - Cast of Foot Print - no hominid feature to the possible foot print; Donny & Donnell - Scat Samples - both mammalian, but not primate; Michael & Kat - Elk Scat Sample to prove Food Source - no primate with the digestive system for elk; Travis & January - NONE; Matthew & Julie - Scat Sample - no usable DNA in the scat; Stacey & Dave - Scat Samples - not a usable sample; Ro & Justin - Eaten Pine Seed from Den - cannot prove they were eaten by a bigfoot.; Eliminated: Travis & January
2	"Big Footage"	January 17, 2014	N/A	TBA
In this episode the eight remaining teams must look for evidence in a large forest. However due to the differences between the big game hunters and the Bigfoot hunters, tension begins to mount. Field Test: Team were tested on their ability to obtain a clear image of a wild animal. Winners received clear image infrared binoculars: Winner: Ro & Justin - Squirrell; Hunt: Evidence Presented: Dan & Dave - Bone, Hair, Scat - no out of the ordinary finds; Kirsten & Shaney - Scat, Hair - hair was mammalian and prompts further investigation; Rictor & Dax - Scat Sample, Hair, Saliva - hair was moss, saliva was insect exude; Donny & Donnell - Scat Samples - turned out to be deer scat; Michael & Kat - Insects - added no new information; Matthew & Julie - Scat, Vertebrate -; Stacey & Dave - Hair - results were inconclusive; Ro & Justin - Scat Samples -; Eliminated"
3	"Trapping Bigfoot"	January 24, 2014	N/A	TBA
The teams must look through Brooks Memorial State Park in Washington.
4	"Bugging Bigfoot"	January 31, 2014	N/A	TBA
The teams must look for Bigfoot around a remote lake, where they must catch blood-sucking insects that may contain Bigfoot DNA.
5	"Spelunking for Sasquatch"	February 7, 2014	N/A	TBA
The five remaining teams must rappel into caverns located at Mount St. Helens.
6	"Big Footprints"	February 14, 2014	N/A	TBA
The four remaining teams search through Six Rivers National Forest in California. One team insists that they have video proof.
7	"Bigfoot Ground Zero"	February 21, 2014	N/A	TBA
Three teams remain and they are taken to Bluff Creek, California, which is known for the 1967 Patterson–Gimlin film.
8	"36 Hours of Hell"	February 21, 2014	N/A	TBA
Now down to the final two teams, the episode takes the two groups to Lake Superior where they try to find Bigfoot by using blood and a baby doll.
