= Jeremy R. Haft =

American author

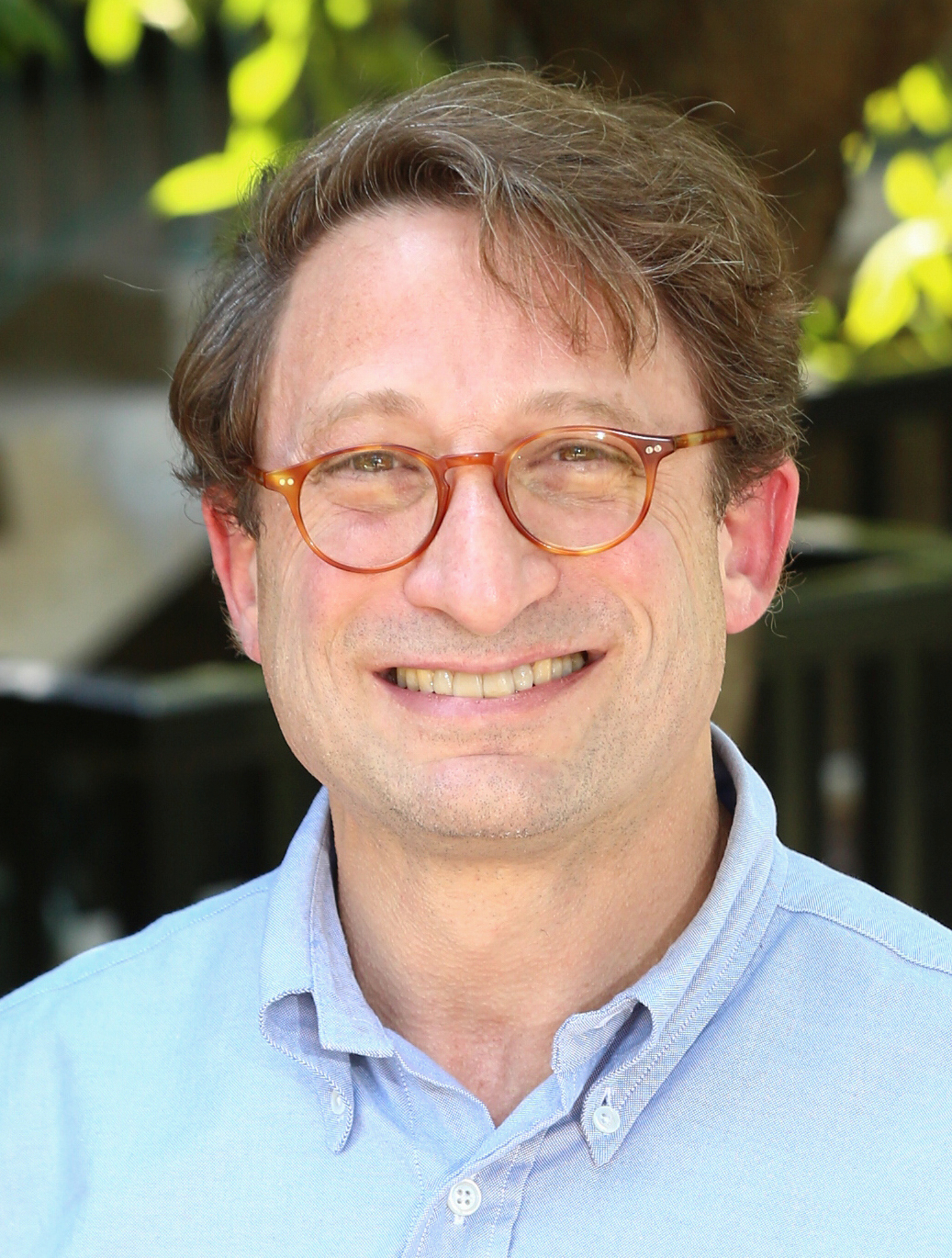
- Born: July 19, 1970 (age 56); Miami Beach, Florida
- Occupations: Author, teacher, businessman
- Website: http://www.jeremyrhaft.com

Jeremy R. Haft (born July 19, 1970) is an American author, teacher, and businessman. His work as a writer and educator predominantly analyzes the fallacies of China's perceived economic might and the competitive advantages of U.S. businesses and labor in the coming century. Haft was CEO of an agricultural export management company, SafeSource Trading from 2013 to 2018.

== Early life ==
Jeremy Haft grew up in Miami, Florida. After graduating from Ransom Everglades High School in 1988, he attended Northwestern University to pursue a career in acting and transferred to Columbia University to work as an actor in New York City. After Columbia, he attended the British American Drama Academy at Balliol College, Oxford University.

== Career ==
=== Academic and Literary Career ===
Haft was an adjunct professor at Georgetown University from 2011 to 2018. As a professor, Haft's curricula explored systemic risk in China's manufacturing and agricultural sectors and its impact on U.S. employment, health and safety, and politics. He is the author of two books on U.S.-China trade, both of which posit America's competitive advantages over China in the coming century.
All the Tea in China: How to Buy, Sell, and Make Money on the Mainland (Penguin Books, 2007) details the practices for importing, exporting, and doing business in China. His second book, Unmade in China (Polity (publisher), 2015) examines America's enduring competitive advantages over China in the coming century. Using firm-level data, Unmade in China tells the story of systemic risk in Chinese manufacturing and why this gives rise to demand for American goods and services, supporting millions of U.S. jobs. Haft was a Term Member of the Council on Foreign Relations from 2007 to 2012.

=== Business career ===
In 1995, Jeremy Haft helped form SiteSpecific, an Internet and direct-marketing agency in New York City. Clients included Bristol-Myers, Squibb, Travelocity, 3M, and the Duracell unit of the Gillette Company. In 1997, a Forrester Research media and technology study listed SiteSpecific as one of the top five Internet agencies. Later in 1997, SiteSpecific was acquired by California-based advertising agency CKS Group.
In 1999, along with a Tiananmen Square Uprising dissident turned entrepreneur, Haft co-founded BChinaB Inc, a New York City-based plastics trading company. BChinaB imported light industrial goods from China from 1999 to 2012.
In 2013, Haft founded SafeSource Trading LLC, a public-private partnership with the Cornell University Cooperative Extension, to export American agricultural products to China. SafeSource helped build export markets in China for small New York ranchers and farmers, eventually expanding to other states.

== Media and Speaking Appearances ==
Haft has spoken at World Affairs Councils, think tanks, Track Two dialogues, community colleges and high schools, among other venues domestically and internationally.

He has testified before the U.S.-China Economic and Security Review Commission, a bipartisan Commission created by the U.S. Congress to monitor and report on trade, economic, and defence issues in the U.S.-China relationship.

His analysis has also been featured in The Wall Street Journal, The Financial Times, NPR, CNN, CNBC, and FOX among others.
