= The Incantation =

- Directed by: Jude S. Walko
- Written by: Jude S. Walko
- Produced by: Dan Campbell
- Cinematography: Derek Street
- Edited by: Robert Crisp
- Music by: Daniel Lepervanche
- Production companies: Blue Falcon Productions; House of Rose
- Distributed by: Gravitas Ventures
- Release date: February 28, 2018 (Hollywood Reel Independent Film Festival)
- Running time: 98 minutes
- Country: United States
- Language: English

The Incantation is a 2018 American independent film and the feature film directorial debut of Jude S. Walko. The film stars Sam Valentine as a young American girl who travels to France for a funeral, only to discover a family history intertwined with witchcraft and occult practices.

The film had premiered at The Hollywood Reel Independent Film Festival in 2018.

== Plot ==
Lucy Bellerose, a young American millennial, travels to France from San Diego, California after receiving some mysterious correspondence from her mother regarding the death of her great-uncle.

After a taxi ride through Paris and then rural France, she arrives at the ominous Borley Castle. There she meets a vicar and chambermaid who seem to have no social skills and speak with archaic verbiage.

At her great-uncle's, the Blood Rose Count's, funeral, she is introduced to J.P., a local French gravedigger, whom she takes a liking to. Soon J.P. takes her for drinks and tells her of the areas strange history, before he is pulled away after one of his relatives is involved in a fatal car accident.

After finding a mysterious book entitled "The Sortilegia" Lucy begins to encounter strange entities and experience supernatural occurrences. These include ghostly sightings of a "black-eyed" ghost girl, an out-of-place traveling insurance salesman, and an ethereal crone who give her ominous warnings.

After a short stay in the castle, and several warnings from the locals, Lucy learns of her family's checkered past and their involvement in witchcraft, devil worship and the occult.

== Cast ==
- Dean Cain, as Abel Baddon
- Sam Valentine, as Lucy Bellerose
- Dylan Kellogg, as Jean-Pierre, the gravedigger
- Jude S. Walko, as The Vicar of Borley
- Beatrice Orro, as Mary, the chambermaid
- Caroline Gatouillat, as Little Rose
- Jerome Marchand, as taxi driver
- Alexandre Majetniak, as drunkard
- Dan Campbell, as Lieutenant Dan
- Margie Clark, as Ethereal Crone
- Sophie "Sweet Shop" Malki, as Ms. Montparnasse

== Production ==
Director Jude S. Walko came up with the idea for the film while working on another film. Walko noticed a photograph of a castle and upon asking its owners, discovered that they had purchased it with the intent to renovate it into a bed and breakfast. They also reported rumors of strange occurrences, which prompted Walko to write a script based around the location. The film marked the directorial debut of director Jude S. Walko and was the first original content film produced by Blue Falcon Productions LLC, co-owned by Walko and producer Dan Campbell. Walko also drew inspiration from the Hammer Horror films.

Most of the filming took place in the Loire Valley in the Cher region of France with primary locations being in La Guerche-Sur-L'Aubois, Nevers and Bourges. In Paris, the production shot several exteriors including Charles de Gaulle airport and the Eiffel Tour. They also spent a day shooting in the Capuchin Quarry adjacent the Catacombs beneath the streets.

== Release ==
The Incantation premiered at The Hollywood Reel Independent Film Festival in Los Angeles on 28 February 2018, after which it continued to screen at film festivals throughout 2018.

The film was optioned by Gravitas Ventures for the United States and Canada and on July 31, 2018 The Incantation was released to home video and VOD.

== Reception ==
Film Threat criticized The Incantation, writing that "the movie is undone by a number of elements, not the least of which are the profoundly bad performances and stilted dialogue." Freddy Beans of Ain't It Cool News was mixed, as they felt that "While I can’t recommend this one completely it does have its charms."

Max Deacon of Scream Horror Magazine and Tracy Palmer of Signal Horizon were more favorable, with the former noting "The Incantation may be a flawed film, but – thanks to the talents of Walko, Valentine and Cain – still frequently has the power to weave its spell."

=== Awards ===
- Best Narrative Feature at the Calcutta Cult Film Festival (2018, won)
- Best Director at The Eclipse Awards (2018, won - Jude S. Walko)
