= Vehix =

Vehix, which operates the Vehix.com website, was an online automotive research and listing service owned by Comcast. The company launched in 2000 in Salt Lake City, developing partnerships with CARFAX and J. D. Power and Associates to provide broad-based, consumer-friendly comparison information about different brands and models of automobiles.

Comcast acquired all of the company in 2008. Derek Mattsson was the head of the company.

Vehix closed in June 2012.
