= Miss Leslie's Dolls =

- Poster art
- Directed by: Joseph G. Prieto
- Written by: Joseph G. Prieto
- Story by: Joseph G. Prieto; Ralph Remy Jr.
- Produced by: Ralph Remy Jr.
- Starring: Salvador Ugarte; Terri Juston
- Cinematography: Gregory Sandor
- Music by: Ralph Remy Jr.
- Production company: World-Wide Film Productions
- Distributed by: Horizon Films
- Release date: December 19, 1972
- Running time: 85 minutes
- Country: United States
- Language: English

Miss Leslie's Dolls is a 1972 American horror film directed by Joseph G. Prieto and starring Salvador Ugarte and Terri Juston. Its plot follows four people who seek refuge in the home of an insane transsexual who collects the corpses of women. The film was released in late 1972 and was subsequently thought to be a lost film, having never received a home media release. In 2018, it was restored and released on Blu-ray and DVD in the United Kingdom by Network Distributing.

== Plot ==
Leslie Lamont is a deranged transsexual woman who lives in isolation in a rural farmhouse. Leslie spends her time studying the occult, grave robbing, and collecting the corpses of women, whose bodies she aspires to possess. Late one night, young professor Alma Frost, along with three of her students, Lily, Martha, and Roy Sanders, are forced to stop their drive back to Boston due to a torrential downpour. They seek shelter in Leslie's house, and she agrees to let them stay. Leslie is visibly disturbed by Martha, whom she says resembles a woman who worked in her mother's doll factory, also named Martha, who died two decades prior in a fire; the fire also claimed the life of Leslie's mother.

In a room in the basement, Roy finds a small stage with what appears to be multiple lifelike female mannequins posed around a goblet of fire. Disturbed, Roy brings Lily and Martha to see the room. Leslie enters the room with Alma, and explains that the room is a place of worship for her own self-constructed religion. Leslie prepares a meal for her guests, consisting of sandwiches, coffee, and wine, the latter two she has drugged. As the four eat, Leslie listens in on their discussion, in which Roy chastises Alma for being uptight.

As the group retire for the night, Martha and Roy begin to have sex to the chagrin of Lily, who is sharing a room with Alma. Alma, a repressed lesbian, attempts to make a sexual advance on Lily, who declines. Alma persists, and the two have sex. After, Alma complains that she feels she has been drugged. After Alma falls asleep, Lily confronts Martha and Roy in bed, and asks to stay in their room. Meanwhile, Leslie preserves a woman's corpse in the basement before communing with her dead mother's skull. Leslie chastises her mother, accusing her spirit of causing Leslie's various attempts to possess a female corpse to fail. She also reveals that she murdered her mother to prevent her from having Leslie committed to a psychiatric hospital. Leslie unveils her plan to be reincarnated in the young Martha's body.

Roy goes downstairs to obtain more wine, and is followed by Lily. In the kitchen, Leslie strangles him unconscious with the handle of an axe. Lily walks in on the murder, and is attacked by Leslie, who hacks her to death. The screams stir Martha, who rushes downstairs and stumbles upon the scene. Leslie attacks Martha on the staircase and hypnotizes her with her pendulum necklace.

Meanwhile, Alma has a nightmare in which she is chained in Leslie's altar room, and the mannequins come to life and torment her. Alma awakens from the nightmare and stumbles through the house, finding her students missing. In a chamber in the basement, Alma finds Lily's bloody corpse. Leslie confronts Alma, and in a struggle, Alma removes a prosthetic mask, revealing Leslie is in fact a man with severe burn scars. Alma flees outside, while Roy awakens in a locked cage. Leslie chases Alma into the woods and to a graveyard, where Alma collapses. There, Leslie's body suddenly disintegrates, and her spirit successfully inhabits Alma's body. Now possessing Alma's body, Leslie returns to the house and seduces Roy.

== Cast ==
- Salvador Ugarte as Leslie Lamont
- Terri Juston as Miss Alma Frost
- Marcelle Bichette as Lily
- Kitty Lewis as Martha
- Charles Pitts as Roy Sanders

== Release ==
The film opened in Pensacola, Florida on December 19, 1972. It later screened in Fort Walton Beach, Florida on March 3, 1973.

=== Home media ===
Miss Leslie's Dolls was never released on VHS or DVD. The film was issued for the first time in home media format on Blu-ray by the British distributor Network in 2018.
