= A Brilliant Monster =

2018 American thriller/horror film

- Directed by: F.C.Rabbath
- Written by: F.C.Rabbath; Adam Bertocci
- Produced by: F.C.Rabbath; Dennis Friebe; Jessica Roszko; Ramsey White; Joshua Ayres
- Starring: Dennis Friebe; Joy Kigin; Nick Leali; Dina Najjar; Alea Figueroa; Bill Kelly; Mark A. Marple; Bryan Perritt
- Cinematography: F.C.Rabbath
- Music by: Valentin Boomes
- Production company: F.C.Rabbath Creations/Multi-Frame Media
- Distributed by: Gravitas Ventures
- Release date: 2018
- Running time: 90 minutes
- Country: United States
- Language: English

A Brilliant Monster is a 2018 American thriller/horror film written and directed by F.C.Rabbath. The film stars Dennis Friebe, Joy Kigin, David Raizor, Nick Leali, Aléa Figueroa, Bill Kelly, Bryan Perritt, Dina Najjar, and Mark A. Marple.

== Plot ==
Mitch Stockridge, a self-help author, has unorthodox ways of getting his story ideas. The price of success may be the loss of one's humanity, but maybe Mitch is willing to pay it.

- Dennis Friebe as Mitch Stockridge
- Joy Kigin as Abby Dunn
- David Raizor as Carver
- Nick Leali as Nick
- Aléa Figueroa as Sophie
- Dina Najjar as Laura
- Gleb Krotov as Young Mitch
- Bryan Perritt as TV Host
- Assistant Director Kayla King
- Second Assistant Director Jeremy King
- Consulting Producers Tatiana Warden and Stephen Smith

== Release ==
World Premiering its theatrical release at the Dances With Films film festival June 16, 2018 at the Grauman's Chinese Theatre.

Gravitas Ventures distributed the film theatrically and home video in May 2019.

=== Critical reception ===
Dread Central "A Brilliant Monster could very well be one of the strongest films to come out of the indie horror scene in 2017 so far,"

Rotten Tomatoes the film holds 100% based on 4 reviews.

Critic's Dens states the film "invokes Hitchcock with a Hint of Henenlotter."

Starburst "bold and surprisingly slick production".
