= Sacrilege (2020 film) =

- Directed by: David Creed
- Written by: David Creed
- Produced by: Mark Kenna
- Cinematography: Sarah Edwards
- Edited by: Ross McFall
- Music by: Colin McGinness
- Release date: 5 March 2020 (Empire, Leicester Square)
- Running time: 83 minutes
- Country: United Kingdom
- Language: English

Sacrilege is a 2020 British folk horror film written and directed by David Creed and produced by Mark Kenna.

== Plot ==
Kayla is a young woman struggling to put her life together while dealing with the heartbreak of a cheating ex, Trish, and the memory of being assaulted and beaten into a coma by a mugger named Jimmy. When she learns from Trish that Jimmy is no longer in prison, Kayla and her friends decide to leave town for the weekend. They choose to go to Mabon, a remote village. They allow Trish to come, which surprises her since she had not been allowed back into their group after the breakup. While on route, the group picks up a hitchhiker, who tells them that the village will be celebrating the Summer Solstice with partying and a ritual. Once they reach the house, they discover that the house contains several marijuana plants, much to the delight of everyone but Trish. She is also reluctant when the same hitchhiker appears at the home to take them to the festival, as she would have preferred to stay and relax.

Once at the gathering, the group learns that the area dedicates the ritual to the goddess Mabon and that each year they offer up their fears. Each member lists their own fear: Blake's is dogs, Stacey's is aging, Trish is afraid of bugs, and Kayla is afraid of Jimmy. While they find this ritual strange, they eagerly take part in order to also partake in the later partying. They're warned by a local woman, Mrs. March, to flee Mabon before the end of the ritual as they are intended to be sacrifices to the goddess Mabon. She is dismissed as a lunatic by the local priest, Father Saxon. The friends soon discover that the warning was accurate, as they begin to experience strange hallucinations. Trish and Kayla reconnect romantically and rekindle their relationship. March appears again to warn them, telling them that the hallucinations cannot harm them but can drive them to harm or kill themselves. If they face their fears, they will survive.

Blake and Stacey both die from their hallucinations; Stacey accidentally impales herself on gardening tools while Blake is killed by running into the road and becoming impaled by stag horns on a local's truck. Trish covers her arms in cleaning fluid, as well as gargling with the chemical in an attempt to rid her body of imagined bugs, but is discovered by Kayla before she can die. Kayla is able to help Trish into their car, but is stopped by the villagers when she tries to leave the village. She's horrified to see her attacker among the crowd. Kayla is initially overpowered by him, but manages to muster her inner strength. She declares that she is no longer afraid of him, causing Jimmy to disappear as he is a hallucination. Kayla also sets fire to a nearby effigy of Mabon, fully breaking any power that is being held over her or Trish. Now powerless, as any attempts to kill Trish or Kayla would be rendered meaningless, the villagers part and allow the two women to leave the town.

== Cast ==
Actor	Role
Tamaryn Payne	Kayla
Emily Wyatt	Trish
Sian Abrahams	Blake
Naomi Willow	Stacey
Ian Champion	Father Saxon
Emma Spurgen-Hussey	Mrs March
Rory Wilton	The Groundsman
Jonny Glasgow	Vinnie
David English	Tyler
Conner McKenzy	Jimmy

== Release ==
Sacrilege premiered on 5 March 2020 at Empire, Leicester Square, followed by a limited theatrical release in the United Kingdom the next day. The worldwide rights on Sacrilege were subsequently picked up by Devilworks who were then able to sell the film virtually in places such as Cannes. The film was released on Blu-ray and VOD on 16 March 2021 in the United States and Canada and on 27 September of the same year in the United Kingdom.

== Reception ==
Sacrilege has a rating of 10% on Rotten Tomatoes, based on 10 reviews. Film Threat and Starburst were critical of the film, both criticizing it as having a lack of originality and for its characters. Horror magazine Rue Morgue was also dismissive. Metro UK was more favorable, praising it for its tension and CGI. Film Threat was also favorable, stating that "The search for the ever-elusive why may blind audience members to what Creed is interested in exploring with his film: one woman's journey to overcome past trauma and finally have the strength to stand up for herself."
