= Adam Bertocci =

American filmmaker (born 1982)

- Born: August 18, 1982 (age 44); New York City, New York, United States
- Occupations: Film director, screenwriter, author

Adam Bertocci (born August 18, 1982) is an American filmmaker based in a suburb of New York City called Bronxville, New York.

== Filmography ==
Year	Film	Role
2011	Shayna Keeps It Simple	Writer/director
2010	Ronan and Alyssa are about to break up.	Writer/director
2009	James K. Polk Was @#?!ing Awesome	Writer/director
2008	Brooklyn Force	Writer/director
2008	Wreck the Halls	Writer
2007	Madison's Résumé	Writer/director
2006	The World of the End	Writer/director
2005	The Dingle	Writer
2005	Pat Gets a Cat	Writer/director
2004	Love: The Movie	Writer/director
2004	Deployed to Scene 4: An Outpost Diary	Director
2004	Two Ugly Sisters	Co-writer
2003	Sparky	Writer/director
2003	Run Leia Run	Writer/director
2002	Date Double	Writer/director

== Two Gentlemen of Lebowski ==
On January 6, 2010, Bertocci posted "Two Gentlemen of Lebowski", a melding of The Big Lebowski with the language and writing style of William Shakespeare. A sold-out off-off-Broadway production of the play ran from March 18 to April 4. It is now published by Simon & Schuster in paperback.
